= List of Romanian football transfers summer 2021 =

This is a list of Romanian football transfers for the 2021 summer transfer window. Only moves featuring 2021–22 Liga I and 2021–22 Liga II are listed.

== Liga I ==
=== Academica Clinceni ===
In:

No.	Pos.	Nation	Player
1	GK	(Romania) ROU	Ștefan Dobre (on loan from Ripensia Timișoara)
9	FW	(Romania) ROU	Cristian Gavra (from Universitatea Cluj)
10	MF	(Belgium) BEL	Floriano Vanzo (from Politehnica Iași)
11	FW	(Greece) GRE	Apostolos Vellios (from (Italy) Ascoli)
20	MF	(Brazil) BRA	William De Amorim (from (Brazil) Esportivo)
24	MF	(Romania) ROU	Marius Cioiu (from Viitorul Târgu Jiu)
27	MF	(Lithuania) LTU	Donatas Kazlauskas (from (Ukraine) Lviv)
77	FW	(France) FRA	Steven Goma (from Pandurii Târgu Jiu)
88	MF	(Romania) ROU	Lucian Filip (from FCSB)
90	DF	(Austria) AUT	Marcel Holzmann (from Botoșani)
92	MF	(Nigeria) NGA	Michael Omoh (from (Israel) Maccabi Ahi Nazareth)
—	DF	(Romania) ROU	Andrei Sin (from Viitorul Târgu Jiu)

Out:

No.	Pos.	Nation	Player
1	GK	(Romania) ROU	Octavian Vâlceanu (to Gaz Metan Mediaș)
9	FW	(Romania) ROU	Raul Rusescu (to Free agent)
10	MF	(Romania) ROU	Cristian Tănase (to Argeș Pitești)
11	FW	(Romania) ROU	Jovan Marković (loan return to CSU Craiova)
17	MF	(Romania) ROU	Ciprian Gliga (to Free agent)
21	DF	(Romania) ROU	Mihai Dobrescu (to Gaz Metan Mediaș)
23	FW	(Bulgaria) BUL	Tsvetelin Chunchukov (loan return to (Bulgaria) Slavia Sofia, later signed by Sepsi Sfântu Gheorghe)
25	MF	(Romania) ROU	Andrei Cordea (to FCSB)
27	MF	(Romania) ROU	David Morar (to FCSB II)
28	MF	(Romania) ROU	Răzvan Andronic (loan return to CFR Cluj)
31	MF	(Romania) ROU	Marius Ciobanu (to Universitatea Cluj, previously on loan at Unirea Slobozia)
37	MF	(Moldova) MDA	Eugeniu Cebotaru (to Petrolul Ploiești)
44	MF	(Romania) ROU	Lucian Dumitriu (to Mioveni)
77	MF	(Romania) ROU	Adrian Popa (to Free agent)
90	FW	(Bulgaria) BUL	Martin Toshev (to (Kazakhstan) Shakhter Karagandy)
99	FW	(Romania) ROU	Robert Jerdea (on loan to Unirea Constanța)

=== Argeș Pitești ===
In:

No.	Pos.	Nation	Player
6	MF	(Romania) ROU	Alexandru Crivac (from Viitorul Constanța)
7	DF	(Portugal) POR	Diogo Viana (from (Portugal) Feirense)
10	MF	(Romania) ROU	Cristian Tănase (from Academica Clinceni)
11	MF	(Romania) ROU	Alexandru Ișfan (from Mioveni)
14	DF	(Portugal) POR	João Miguel (from (Portugal) Mafra)
15	FW	(Romania) ROU	Tiberiu Coman (from Rapid București, previously on loan at Mioveni)
17	DF	(Romania) ROU	Andrei Pițian (from Chindia Târgoviște)
18	FW	(Romania) ROU	Theodor Butoiu (from FC Dănuț Coman, previously on loan at Concordia Chiajna)
20	MF	(Romania) ROU	Robert Curescu (from Deva)
24	DF	(Romania) ROU	Tudor Telcean (on loan from Universitatea Cluj)
26	DF	(Romania) ROU	Claudiu Moisie (from Star Sport Argeș, previously on loan at Pandurii Târgu Jiu)
29	MF	(Romania) ROU	Denis Dumitrașcu (from Chindia Târgoviște)
42	FW	(Portugal) POR	Jucie Lupeta (from (Israel) Maccabi Petah Tikva)
44	FW	(Italy) ITA	Said Ahmed Said (from (Portugal) Rio Ave)
—	MF	(Romania) ROU	André Cozma (loan return from Hușana Huși)
—	MF	(Romania) ROU	Ovidiu Rașoveanu (loan return from Pandurii Târgu Jiu)
—	FW	(Romania) ROU	Cristian Dumitru (on loan from FCSB, previously on loan)

Out:

No.	Pos.	Nation	Player
6	MF	(Spain) ESP	Pablo de Lucas (to Free agent)
9	MF	(Romania) ROU	Alin Popa (to Free agent)
10	MF	(Romania) ROU	Ionuț Năstăsie (to Hermannstadt)
11	MF	(Romania) ROU	Stephan Drăghici (loan return to CSU Craiova, later signed by Steaua București)
14	DF	(Romania) ROU	Mihai Leca (to Free agent)
15	MF	(Romania) ROU	Andrei Mirică (to Free agent)
17	MF	(Romania) ROU	Robert Grecu (to Astra Giurgiu)
18	FW	(Senegal) SEN	Mediop Ndiaye (to Free agent)
20	MF	(Belgium) BEL	Alexander Maes (to (Belgium) Lierse Kempenzonen)
24	MF	(Portugal) POR	Sérgio Marakis (to (Austria) Horn)
26	DF	(Croatia) CRO	Luka Marić (to Free agent)
28	FW	(Switzerland) SUI	Cephas Malele (to Free agent)
32	DF	(France) FRA	Sylvain Deslandes (to (Hungary) Debrecen)
33	GK	(Romania) ROU	George Micle (on loan to Universitatea Cluj)

=== Botoșani ===
In:

No.	Pos.	Nation	Player
7	FW	MKD	Petar Petkovski (from (North Macedonia) Rabotnički)
22	GK	ROU	David Duțu (from Popești-Leordeni)
24	FW	FRA	Richard Sila (from (France) Paris, previously on loan at (France) Concarneau)
44	MF	BEL	Martin Remacle (from Voluntari)
69	FW	ROU	Bogdan Melinte (from Minaur Baia Mare)
77	DF	ROU	Andrei Dragu (from Viitorul Târgu Jiu)
89	MF	COD	Hervé Kage (from (Luxembourg) Swift Hesperange)
90	FW	GHA	Paul Mensah (from (Austria) Kapfenberg)

Out:

No.	Pos.	Nation	Player
3	DF	CIV	Ulrich Meleke (to CFR Cluj)
5	DF	ROU	Florin Plămadă (to Politehnica Iași)
7	FW	FRA	Hamidou Keyta (to (Portugal) Santa Clara)
8	MF	ARG	Jonathan Rodríguez (to CFR Cluj)
9	FW	SYR	Mahmoud Al-Mawas (to Free agent)
13	GK	AUT	Hidajet Hankič (to (Bulgaria) Botev Plovdiv)
15	MF	MKD	Stefan Ashkovski (to Sepsi Sfântu Gheorghe)
24	MF	DEN	Youssef Toutouh (to Free agent)
29	MF	ROU	Marian Târșa (to Politehnica Iași)
87	MF	ITA	Bryan Mendoza (to Free agent, previously on loan at Comuna Recea)
90	DF	AUT	Marcel Holzmann (to Academica Clinceni)

=== CFR Cluj ===
In:

No.	Pos.	Nation	Player
1	GK	ROU	Rareș Murariu (from ASU Politehnica, previously on loan)
2	DF	CIV	Ulrich Meleke (from Botoșani)
5	MF	ARG	Jonathan Rodríguez (from Botoșani)
6	DF	BIH	Daniel Graovac (from Astra Giurgiu)
21	MF	MAR	Anas Tahiri (from (Netherlands) RKC Waalwijk)
23	GK	POR	Cristiano (from Hermannstadt)
27	MF	ROU	Claudiu Petrila (loan return from Sepsi Sfântu Gheorghe)
29	DF	ALG	Rachid Bouhenna (from Sepsi Sfântu Gheorghe)
76	MF	FRA	Guessouma Fofana (from (France) Guingamp)
77	FW	ROU	Denis Alibec (on loan from (Turkey) Kayserispor)
82	MF	ROU	Alin Fică (loan return from Comuna Recea)
86	MF	ROU	Denis Rusu (from Șoimii Lipova, previously on loan at UTA Arad)
87	GK	LTU	Giedrius Arlauskis (from Free agent)
88	MF	ROU	Răzvan Andronic (loan return from Academica Clinceni)
89	GK	ROU	Otto Hindrich (loan return from ASU Politehnica Timișoara)
—	DF	ROU	Mihai Butean (loan return from Gaz Metan Mediaș)
—	MF	ROU	Alexandru Ioniță (loan return from Astra Giurgiu)
—	MF	ROU	Sebastian Mailat (loan return from Voluntari)

Out:

No.	Pos.	Nation	Player
5	MF	BRA	Soares (to Free agent)
6	MF	POR	Luís Aurélio (to Free agent)
11	MF	FRA	Michaël Pereira (to (Turkey) Kocaelispor)
12	GK	POL	Grzegorz Sandomierski (to (Poland) Górnik Zabrze)
15	DF	TUN	Syam Ben Youssef (to Free agent)
37	MF	ROU	Mihai Bordeianu (loan return to (Saudi Arabia) Al-Qadsiah)
55	DF	BRA	Paulo Vinícius (to FCSB)
86	DF	ROU	Gheorghe Tomșa (on loan to Hermannstadt)
98	FW	ROU	Nicolae Carnat (on loan to Rapid București)
99	FW	VEN	Mario Rondón (to (Poland) Radomiak Radom)
—	GK	ROU	Ionuț Rus (on loan to Ripensia Timișoara, previously on loan at Hermannstadt)
—	DF	ROU	Rareș Ispas (on loan to Sepsi Sfântu Gheorghe, previously on loan at Comuna Recea)
—	FW	ROU	Cătălin Golofca (to Sepsi Sfântu Gheorghe, previously on loan)
—	FW	ROU	Daniel Paraschiv (on loan to Voluntari, previously signed from Viitorul Târgu Jiu)
—	FW	ROU	Sebastian Serediuc (to ASU Politehnica, previously on loan at Unirea Dej)

=== Chindia Târgoviște ===
In:

No.	Pos.	Nation	Player
3	DF	GRE	Nikolaos Baxevanos (from (Italy) Lazio, previously on loan at Politehnica Iași)
8	MF	ROU	Marco Dulca (from Viitorul Constanța, previously on loan)
6	DF	ROU	Paul Iacob (from Viitorul Constanța, previously on loan)
9	MF	ROU	Răzvan Matiș (on loan from Farul Constanța)
17	MF	ROU	Marian Șerban (from Universitatea Craiova, previously on loan at Mioveni)
19	FW	ROU	Daniel Popa (from Dinamo București, previously on loan)
20	DF	ALB	Simon Rrumbullaku (from UTA Arad)
22	MF	ROU	Sergiu Suciu (from (Italy) Juve Stabia)
33	GK	ROU	Cătălin Căbuz (from Viitorul Constanța)
59	MF	ROU	Doru Popadiuc (from Politehnica Iași)
98	DF	ROU	Tiberiu Căpușă (from Viitorul Constanța, previously on loan)

Out:

No.	Pos.	Nation	Player
7	MF	BFA	Blaise Yaméogo (to Free agent)
9	FW	SWE	Valmir Berisha (to Free agent)
10	FW	ROU	Mihai Neicuțescu (loan return to Dinamo București)
14	MF	ARG	Tomás Díaz (loan return to Sepsi Sfântu Gheorghe, later signed by (Argentina) Talleres)
17	DF	ROU	Andrei Pițian (to Argeș Pitești)
22	MF	MDA	Vadim Rață (to Voluntari)
24	DF	ROU	Alex Negrea (to Free agent)
25	GK	ROU	Mihai Aioani (to Farul Constanța)
27	DF	ROU	Florinel Mitrea (to Universitatea Cluj)
29	FW	ROU	Mihai Costea (to Free agent)
48	DF	MLI	Bourama Fomba (to (Ukraine) Oleksandriya)
80	MF	ROU	Denis Dumitrașcu (to Argeș Pitești)

=== Dinamo București ===
In:

No.	Pos.	Nation	Player
1	GK	ROU	Ștefan Fara (loan return from Farul Constanța)
17	DF	ROU	Alin Dudea (loan return from Reșița)
21	FW	ROU	Mihai Neicuțescu (loan return from Chindia Târgoviște)

Out:

No.	Pos.	Nation	Player
1	GK	NOR	Gudmund Kongshavn (to Free agent)
2	DF	ESP	Raúl Albentosa (to Free agent)
9	FW	SEN	Magaye Gueye (to Free agent)
9	FW	NGA	Joseph Akpala (to Free agent)
10	MF	CUW	Gevaro Nepomuceno (to Free agent)
17	FW	SVK	Adam Nemec (to Voluntari)
19	FW	ROU	Andrei Blejdea (to Universitatea Cluj)
23	MF	ROU	Ionuț Șerban (to Free agent)
26	MF	SWE	Jonathan Morsay (loan return to (Italy) Chievo)
30	DF	ROU	Florin Bejan (to Hermannstadt)
31	MF	ITA	Diego Fabbrini (to (Italy) Ascoli)
34	GK	ROU	Aleksander Mitrovic (to Free agent)
55	MF	POL	Janusz Gol (to (Poland) Górnik Łęczna)
66	DF	CRO	Ante Puljić (to (Israel) Bnei Sakhnin)
77	MF	ROU	Vlad Achim (to FC U Craiova)
—	FW	ROU	Daniel Popa (to Chindia Târgoviște, previously on loan)

=== Farul Constanța ===
In:

No.	Pos.	Nation	Player
1	GK	ROU	Árpád Tordai (from Viitorul Constanța, previously on loan at (Hungary) Fehérvár)
2	DF	ROU	Radu Boboc (from Viitorul Constanța)
3	DF	ROU	Gabriel Buta (from Viitorul Constanța)
4	DF	FRA	Damien Dussaut (from Viitorul Constanța)
5	DF	ROU	Sebastian Mladen (from Viitorul Constanța)
6	DF	NED	Bradley de Nooijer (from Viitorul Constanța, previously on loan (Ukraine) Vorskla Poltava)
7	FW	ROU	George Ganea (from Viitorul Constanța)
8	MF	ROU	Carlo Casap (from Viitorul Constanța)
9	FW	ROU	Adrian Petre (from UTA Arad)
10	FW	ESP	Jefté Betancor (from Voluntari)
11	DF	ROU	Andrei Ciobanu (from Viitorul Constanța)
12	GK	ROU	Mihai Aioani (from Chindia Târgoviște)
17	DF	ROU	Ionuț Larie (from Gaz Metan Mediaș)
18	MF	ROU	Andrei Artean (from Viitorul Constanța)
21	DF	ROU	Alin Dobrosavlevici (from Viitorul Constanța)
22	FW	ROU	Luca Andronache (from Viitorul Constanța)
23	DF	ROU	Virgil Ghiță (from Viitorul Constanța)
24	MF	ROU	Constantin Grameni (from Viitorul Constanța)
25	FW	ROU	Aurelian Chițu (from Viitorul Constanța)
26	DF	ROU	Bogdan Lazăr (from Viitorul Constanța)
27	FW	CPV	Ely Fernandes (from Viitorul Constanța)
30	MF	ROU	Florin Purece (from Sepsi Sfântu Gheorghe)
31	GK	ROU	Cosmin Dur-Bozoancă (from Viitorul Constanța, previously on loan)
52	MF	BRA	Romário Pires (from Hermannstadt)
66	MF	ESP	Josemi Castañeda (from Viitorul Constanța)
77	DF	ROU	Darius Grosu (from Viitorul Constanța)
80	MF	ROU	Alexi Pitu (from Viitorul Constanța)
94	GK	ROU	Laurențiu Brănescu (from Politehnica Iași)
97	DF	ROU	Alexandru Georgescu (from Viitorul Constanța)
99	MF	ROU	Ștefan Bodișteanu (from Viitorul Constanța)

Out:

No.	Pos.	Nation	Player
4	DF	ROU	Vlad Gîsă (to Free agent)
5	MF	MDA	Ion Cărăruș (to Unirea Constanța)
7	MF	ROU	Florin Bălan (loan return to FC Voluntari)
8	MF	ROU	Paul Antoche (to Hermannstadt)
9	FW	ROU	Andrei Banyoi (to Unirea Constanța)
10	MF	ROU	Alexandru Stoica (loan return to Viitorul Constanța, later signed by Free agent)
11	FW	MDA	Ilie Damașcan (to Unirea Constanța)
14	DF	ROU	Robert Băjan (to Unirea Constanța)
14	DF	ROU	Marius Leca (on loan to Unirea Constanța)
16	DF	ROU	Ionuț Ursu (to Unirea Constanța)
17	FW	ROU	Simon Măzărache (to Petrolul Ploiești)
18	FW	ROU	Cezar Gherghiceanu (to Free agent)
20	FW	ROU	Vlad Rusu (to Viitorul Târgu Jiu)
21	GK	ROU	Ștefan Fara (loan return to Dinamo II București)
22	DF	ROU	Iulian Carabela (to Unirea Constanța)
23	MF	ROU	Antonio Cruceru (to Unirea Slobozia)
24	DF	ROU	Marius Savu (loan return to Star Sport)
27	MF	ROU	Ionuț Pelivan (to Free agent)
30	MF	ROU	Liviu Mihai (to Unirea Constanța)
33	MF	ROU	Robert Silaghi (loan return to CFR Cluj)
45	MF	ROU	Ștefan Rus (to Free agent)
77	MF	ROU	Cosmin Bîrnoi (to ASU Politehnica Timișoara)
95	MF	ROU	Răzvan Greu (to Unirea Slobozia)
97	DF	ROU	Dan Panait (to Brașov)
98	MF	ROU	Darius Ciolacu (to Free agent)
—	MF	ROU	Daniel Nicula (loan return to Gaz Metan Mediaș)
—	DF	ROU	Ștefan Sima (to Free agent, previously on loan at Gloria Albești)
—	MF	ROU	Florian Haită (on loan to Universitatea Cluj, previously signed from Viitorul Constanța)
—	MF	ROU	Răzvan Iorga (on loan to Brașov)
—	MF	ROU	Răzvan Matiș (on loan to Chindia Târgoviște, previously signed from Viitorul Constanța)
—	MF	ROU	Alexandru Negrean (on loan to Brașov)

=== FC U Craiova ===
In:

No.	Pos.	Nation	Player
4	DF	CRO	Dominik Kovačić (from (Croatia) Lokomotiva, previously on loan at (Denmark) Vejle)
6	MF	ROU	Vlad Achim (from Dinamo București)
7	FW	POR	Hugo Vieira (from Free agent)
10	MF	ARG	Juan Bauza (from (Argentina) Colón, previously on loan at Miercurea Ciuc)
18	DF	CIV	Mamadou Bagayoko (from Free agent)
25	DF	SRB	Marko Gajić (from (Serbia) Voždovac)
44	DF	POR	Pedro Machado (from (Portugal) Oliveirense)
51	FW	BEL	Sekou Sidibe (from (Netherlands) Emmen)
77	MF	GHA	Samuel Asamoah (from (Belgium) Sint-Truiden)
94	GK	AUT	Armin Gremsl (from (Austria) St. Pölten)

Out:

No.	Pos.	Nation	Player
7	FW	ARG	Ignacio Cacheiro (to Free agent)
18	MF	ROU	Călin Cristea (to Free agent)
19	MF	ROU	Marian Anghelina (to Concordia Chiajna)
20	DF	ROU	Alexandru Gîț (to Universitatea Cluj)
23	DF	ROU	Costinel Gugu (to Universitatea Cluj)
29	MF	ROU	Samuel Zimța (to Free agent)
30	MF	ROU	Marian Stoenac (to Politehnica Iași)
32	GK	ARG	Federico Taborda (to Free agent)
44	DF	ROU	Denis Ispas (to Universitatea Cluj)
76	FW	COD	Arsène Luboya (to Free agent)
77	MF	ROU	Valentin Munteanu (to Free agent)
78	DF	FRA	Abdelaye Diakité (to Free agent)
92	FW	ROU	Adrian Voicu (to Concordia Chiajna)
99	FW	ROU	Andrei Ciolacu (to Free agent)
—	DF	ROU	Radu Criștiu (to Free agent)
—	MF	ROU	Vlad Boția (to Free agent, previously on loan at Corona Brașov)
—	MF	ROU	Robert Tudor (to Free agent, previously on loan at Alexandria)

=== FCSB ===
In:

No.	Pos.	Nation	Player
5	MF	ROU	Alexandru Crețu (from (Slovenia) Maribor)
19	FW	ROU	Ianis Stoica (loan return from Slatina)
20	FW	ROU	Andrei Burlacu (from Universitatea Craiova)
28	FW	ROU	Andrei Dumiter (from Sepsi Sfântu Gheorghe)
29	DF	AUT	Stipe Vučur (from (Germany) Hallescher FC)
31	FW	CRO	Ivan Mamut (from Universitatea Craiova)
55	DF	BRA	Paulo Vinícius (from CFR Cluj)
98	MF	ROU	Andrei Cordea (from Academica Clinceni)

Out:

No.	Pos.	Nation	Player
5	MF	ROU	Gabriel Simion (on loan to (Cyprus) Aris Limassol)
8	MF	ROU	Lucian Filip (to Academica Clinceni)
9	FW	CRO	Ante Vukušić (to Free agent)
13	FW	CZE	Zdeněk Ondrášek (to Free agent, previously signed from (Czech Republic) Viktoria Plzeň)
16	MF	ROU	Dragoș Nedelcu (on loan to (Germany) Fortuna Düsseldorf)
18	DF	GRE	Aristidis Soiledis (to Free agent)
20	MF	ROU	Ionuț Vînă (to Universitatea Craiova)
21	FW	ROU	Alexandru Buziuc (to Mioveni)
22	FW	ROU	Cristian Dumitru (on loan to Argeș Pitești, previously on loan)
24	MF	ROU	Robert Ion (on loan to Voluntari)
28	DF	ROU	Alexandru Pantea (on loan to Hermannstadt)
31	FW	ROU	Andrei Istrate (on loan to Politehnica Iași)
77	DF	ROU	Alexandru Stan (to Politehnica Iași)
—	DF	ROU	Marius Briceag (to Voluntari, previously on loan)

=== Gaz Metan Mediaș ===
In:

No.	Pos.	Nation	Player
1	GK	ROU	Octavian Vâlceanu (from Academica Clinceni)
4	MF	ROU	Ioan Filip (from Universitatea Cluj)
5	MF	POR	Diogo Izata (from (Portugal) Vilafranquense)
6	MF	ROU	Mihai Lixandru (on loan from FCSB II, previously on loan at Viitorul Târgu Jiu)
13	DF	CPV	Félix Mathaus (from (Portugal) Académico Viseu)
15	MF	ROU	Ramon Gașpar (from (Republic of Ireland) Cork City)
19	FW	CZE	Tomáš Smola (loan return from (Czech Republic) Opava)
21	DF	ROU	Mihai Dobrescu (from Academica Clinceni)
23	MF	ROU	Răzvan Grădinaru (from Viitorul Constanța)
25	DF	ARG	Patricio Matricardi (from Hermannstadt)
—	MF	ROU	Paul Pațurcă (from Buzău)
—	FW	NGA	Christian Irobiso (from (Portugal) Varzim)

Out:

No.	Pos.	Nation	Player
5	DF	CZE	Ondřej Bačo (to (Israel) Hapoel Jerusalem)
12	GK	ROU	Răzvan Pleșca (Retired)
21	DF	ROU	Mihai Butean (loan return to CFR Cluj)
25	DF	ROU	Ionuț Larie (to Farul Constanța)
27	MF	BRA	Eric (to Free agent)
29	FW	POR	Zé Manuel (to (Portugal) Rio Ave)
70	FW	POR	Idrisa Sambú (to Free agent)
70	MF	ROU	Raul Hăjmășan (to Free agent)
91	FW	POR	Ricardo Valente (to (Turkey) Tuzlaspor)
99	GK	ROU	Albert Popa (on loan to Dunărea Călărași)
—	MF	ROU	Carlo Danciu (on loan to Astra Giurgiu)

=== Mioveni ===
In:

No.	Pos.	Nation	Player
1	GK	ROU	Valentin Sima (loan return from Știința Miroslava)
11	MF	ROU	Lucian Dumitriu (from Academica Clinceni)
15	DF	ROU	Adrian Scarlatache (from Hermannstadt)
17	FW	ROU	Andrei Cristea (from Politehnica Iași)
20	FW	ROU	Alexandru Buziuc (from FCSB)
25	DF	ROU	Ionuț Balaur (from Voluntari)
28	FW	ROU	Cosmin Tucaliuc (from Viitorul II Constanța, previously on loan at Buzău)
80	MF	ROU	Emanuel Dat (from Reșița)
—	GK	ROU	Marius Călinoiu (loan return from Unirea Bascov)
—	GK	ROU	Florin Șerban (loan return from Vedița Colonești)
—	MF	ROU	Bogdan Zamfirescu (loan return from Unirea Bascov)
—	FW	ROU	Alin Călin (loan return from Unirea Bascov)

Out:

No.	Pos.	Nation	Player
2	DF	ROU	Adrian Mar (to UTA Arad)
3	MF	ROU	Leonard Alexandrescu (to Free agent)
11	MF	ROU	Alexandru Ișfan (to Argeș Pitești)
17	MF	ROU	Valentin Cristea (to Free agent)
20	MF	ROU	Marian Șerban (loan return to Universitatea Craiova, later signed by Chindia Târgoviște)
25	FW	ROU	Sebastian Ivan (on loan to Unirea Slobozia)
31	FW	ROU	Tiberiu Coman (loan return to Rapid București, later signed by Argeș Pitești)
32	DF	ROU	Antonio Niță (to Free agent)
—	DF	ROU	Fabrizio Constantin (to Hermannstadt, previously on loan at Unirea Bascov)

=== Rapid București ===
In:

No.	Pos.	Nation	Player
4	MF	CRO	Ljuban Crepulja (from Astra Giurgiu)
8	FW	ROU	Nicolae Carnat (on loan from CFR Cluj)
11	DF	BRA	Júnior Morais (from (Turkey) Gaziantep)
18	MF	MAR	Saifeddine Alami (from Dunărea Călărași)
20	MF	ROU	Romario Moise (from Astra Giurgiu, previously on loan at Petrolul Ploiești)
22	DF	ROU	Cristian Săpunaru (from (Turkey) Kayserispor)
23	MF	ROU	Alexandru Albu (on loan from Concordia Chiajna, previously on loan at UTA Arad)
27	DF	ROU	Dragoș Grigore (from (Bulgaria) Ludogorets Razgrad)
44	DF	ROU	Alin Demici (loan return from Slatina)
57	FW	MAR	Younes Bnou Marzouk (from (Switzerland) Chiasso)
77	DF	ROU	Claudiu Belu (from Hermannstadt)

Out:

No.	Pos.	Nation	Player
1	GK	AUS	Harrison Devenish-Meares (to SSU Politehnica Timișoara)
5	DF	CRO	Ivica Žunić (to Free agent)
8	MF	ROU	Rareș Lazăr (on loan to SSU Politehnica Timișoara)
10	MF	ROU	Marian Drăghiceanu (to CSM Reșița)
18	MF	ROU	Octavian Ursu (to SSU Politehnica Timișoara)
20	MF	ROU	Daniel Benzar (to SSU Politehnica Timișoara)
28	DF	ROU	Ionuț Voicu (Retired)
32	MF	ROU	Amir Jorza (to CSM Reșița)
99	FW	LBR	Emmanuel Ernest (to Ripensia Timișoara)
—	GK	ROU	Alexandru Achiriloaiei (to Free agent, previously on loan at Popești-Leordeni)
—	FW	ROU	Tiberiu Coman (to Argeș Pitești, previously on loan at Mioveni)

=== Sepsi Sfântu Gheorghe ===
In:

No.	Pos.	Nation	Player
2	DF	POR	Hugo Sousa (from Astra Giurgiu)
12	GK	ROU	Răzvan Began (from Dunărea Călărași)
15	MF	MKD	Stefan Ashkovski (from Botoșani)
21	MF	ROU	Cristian Bărbuț (from Universitatea Craiova)
23	FW	BUL	Tsvetelin Chunchukov (from (Bulgaria) Slavia Sofia, previously on loan at Academica Clinceni)
27	DF	ROU	Rareș Ispas (on loan from CFR Cluj, previously on loan at Comuna Recea)
29	FW	MDA	Vitalie Damașcan (from (Italy) Torino, previously on loan at (Netherlands) RKC Waalwijk)
30	MF	ROU	Vlad Mitrea (loan return from Petrolul Ploiești)
55	MF	SVN	Rajko Rep (from (Austria) Hartberg)
90	FW	ROU	Cătălin Golofca (from CFR Cluj, previously on loan)
91	MF	SRB	Petar Bojić (from (Serbia) Vojvodina)
96	MF	ROU	János Botorok (on loan from Miercurea Ciuc)

Out:

No.	Pos.	Nation	Player
1	GK	ROU	Béla Fejér (to (Hungary) Nyíregyháza Spartacus, previously on loan)
2	DF	GRE	Panagiotis Deligiannidis (to Free agent)
5	MF	ROU	Lóránt Kovács (on loan to Miercurea Ciuc)
7	MF	ROU	George Dragomir (on loan to Brașov)
9	FW	ROU	Andrei Dumiter (to FCSB)
10	MF	ROU	Lóránd Fülöp (loan return to (Hungary) Puskás Akadémia, later signed by Voluntari)
12	GK	ESP	Jesús Fernández (to Free agent)
13	FW	SWE	Admir Bajrovic (to (Greece) Chania)
18	FW	SVK	Pavol Šafranko (to (South Africa) Mamelodi Sundowns)
19	MF	FRA	Bryan Nouvier (to (Luxembourg) Jeunesse Esch)
21	MF	SVK	Peter Gál-Andrezly (to Miercurea Ciuc)
25	FW	SUI	Simone Rapp (to (Liechtenstein) Vaduz)
27	MF	ROU	Claudiu Petrila (loan return to CFR Cluj)
29	DF	ALG	Rachid Bouhenna (to CFR Cluj)
30	MF	ROU	Florin Purece (to Farul Constanța)
96	DF	ROU	Florin Ștefan (to Free agent)
—	FW	ARG	Tomás Díaz (to (Argentina) Talleres, previously on loan at Chindia Târgoviște)
—	MF	AUT	Aleksa Markovic (to Free agent)

=== Universitatea Craiova ===
In:

No.	Pos.	Nation	Player
1	GK	ROU	David Lazar (from Astra Giurgiu)
10	MF	ROU	Ionuț Vînă (from FCSB)
20	FW	ROU	Jovan Marković (loan return from Academica Clinceni)
22	MF	BRA	Gustavo (loan return from (United Arab Emirates) Ajman)
24	MF	ROU	Alexandru Mărieș (from Comuna Recea)
25	DF	ROU	Valerică Găman (from Astra Giurgiu)
26	MF	BUL	Antoni Ivanov (loan return from Voluntari)
29	DF	FRA	Antoine Conte (from (Israel) Beitar Jerusalem)
31	GK	MDA	Denis Rusu (from Viitorul Târgu Jiu)
—	DF	ROU	Florin Borța (loan return from Concordia Chiajna)
—	FW	ROU	Alexandru Popescu (loan return from Aerostar Bacău)

Out:

No.	Pos.	Nation	Player
10	MF	ROU	Alexandru Cicâldău (to (Turkey) Galatasaray)
12	GK	ROU	Laurențiu Popescu (on loan to Politehnica Iași)
15	MF	ROU	Marian Șerban (to Chindia Târgoviște, previously on loan at Mioveni)
15	MF	ROU	Ovidiu Bic (on loan to (Israel) Hapoel Ironi Kiryat Shmona)
20	FW	ROU	Alexandru Tudorie (loan return to (Russia) Arsenal Tula)
22	MF	ROU	Cristian Bărbuț (to Sepsi Sfântu Gheorghe)
24	MF	ESP	Juan Cámara (loan return to (Poland) Jagiellonia Białystok, later on loan to (Azerbaijan) Sabah)
25	GK	ROU	Andrei Marinescu (to Free agent)
26	DF	CIV	Stephane Acka (to (Israel) Hapoel Ironi Kiryat Shmona)
30	FW	CRO	Ivan Mamut (to FCSB)
32	FW	ROU	Andrei Burlacu (to FCSB)
—	MF	ROU	Stephan Drăghici (to Steaua București, previously on loan at Argeș Pitești)
—	MF	ROU	Alin Manea (to ASU Politehnica Timișoara, previously on loan)

=== UTA Arad ===
In:

No.	Pos.	Nation	Player
3	DF	CRO	Vinko Međimorec (from (Azerbaijan) Gabala)
23	DF	ROU	Constantin Dima (from (Ukraine) Desna Chernihiv)
23	DF	LTU	Rolandas Baravykas (from (Albania) Kukësi)
11	DF	ROU	Adrian Mar (from Mioveni)
15	DF	MNE	Marko Vukčević (from (Montenegro) Podgorica)
—	DF	ROU	Răzvan Ivan (loan return from Gloria Lunca-Teuz Cermei)
17	MF	ROU	Tudor Călin (from Ripensia Timișoara)
19	MF	ALB	Idriz Batha (from (Albania) Tirana)
20	MF	NED	Desley Ubbink (from (Poland) Podbeskidzie)
97	MF	ROU	Denis Hrezdac (loan return from Hunedoara)
—	MF	ROU	Andrei Gavrilă (loan return from Șoimii Lipova)
6	MF	ARG	Juan Pablo Passaglia (from Politehnica Iași)
9	FW	CRO	Filip Dangubić (from (Slovenia) Celje)

Out:

No.	Pos.	Nation	Player
6	MF	ROU	Alexandru Albu (loan return to Concordia Chiajna, later on loan to Rapid București)
11	FW	ROU	Adrian Petre (to Farul Constanța)
17	DF	ROU	Cristian Melinte (to Free agent)
19	FW	ROU	Ciprian Rus (to Viitorul Târgu Jiu)
20	DF	ALB	Simon Rrumbullaku (to Chindia Târgoviște)
23	MF	ROU	Neluț Roșu (to Voluntari)
28	FW	ROU	Valentin Buhăcianu (to Hermannstadt)
41	MF	ROU	Dragoș Tescan (to Universitatea Cluj)
44	FW	ROU	Albert Voinea (to Universitatea Cluj)
77	DF	ROU	Andrei Peteleu (to Free agent)
86	MF	ROU	Denis Rusu (loan return to Șoimii Lipova, later signed by CFR Cluj)

=== Voluntari ===
In:

No.	Pos.	Nation	Player
6	DF	ROU	Marius Briceag (from FCSB, previously on loan)
7	MF	ROU	Robert Ion (on loan from FCSB)
9	FW	ROU	Daniel Paraschiv (on loan from CFR Cluj)
20	MF	ROU	Neluț Roșu (from UTA Arad)
22	MF	MDA	Vadim Rață (from Chindia Târgoviște)
28	DF	ROU	Vlăduț Andreș (from Ceahlăul Piatra Neamț)
35	MF	ROU	Florin Bălan (loan return from Farul Constanța)
77	FW	SVK	Adam Nemec (from Dinamo București)
80	MF	ROU	Lóránd Fülöp (from (Hungary) Puskás Akadémia, previously on loan at Sepsi Sfântu Gheorghe)
96	MF	ROU	Alin Lazăr (from Dinamo București II)
99	MF	ROU	Antonio Stan (from Politehnica Iași)
—	DF	ROU	Oktay Özkara (loan return from Unirea Slobozia)
—	MF	ROU	Marius Matei (from Ceahlăul Piatra Neamț)
—	MF	ROU	George Merloi (from Astra Giurgiu)

Out:

No.	Pos.	Nation	Player
4	MF	BUL	Antoni Ivanov (loan return to CS U Craiova)
7	FW	CRO	Ivan Pešić (loan return to (Ukraine) Vorskla Poltava)
9	FW	ESP	Jefté Betancor (to Farul Constanța)
17	MF	ROU	Sebastian Mailat (loan return to CFR Cluj)
28	DF	ROU	Ionuț Balaur (to Mioveni)
44	MF	BEL	Martin Remacle (to Botoșani)
90	DF	ALG	Mourad Satli (to Free agent)
91	FW	NGA	Haruna Garba (to Free agent, previously signed from Free agent)
99	MF	ROU	Claudiu Borțoneanu (on loan to Metaloglobus București)
—	FW	ROU	Adelin Voinescu (to Dacia Unirea Brăila)

== Liga II ==
=== 1599 Șelimbăr ===
In:

No.	Pos.	Nation	Player
—	GK	ROU	Rareș Gal (on loan from CFR II Cluj, previously on loan at Foresta Suceava)
—	DF	FRA	Messie Biatoumoussoka (from (Cyprus) Xylotymbou)
—	DF	ROU	Radu Crișan (from Astra Giurgiu, previously on loan at Dunărea Călărași)
—	MF	ROU	Robert Boboc (from Astra Giurgiu, previously on loan at CSM Reșița)
—	MF	ROU	Alexandru Luca (on loan from Interstar Sibiu, previously on loan at Măgura Cisnădie)

Out:

No.	Pos.	Nation	Player
—	DF	ROU	Sebastian Ignat (loan return to Voluntari II)
—	MF	ROU	Alexandru Ban (to Hermannstadt, previously on loan at Măgura Cisnădie)

=== Astra Giurgiu ===
In:

No.	Pos.	Nation	Player
—	DF	ROU	Andrei Trușescu (loan return from Vedița Colonești)
—	MF	ROU	Sebastian Culda (loan return from SCM Zalău)
—	FW	ROU	Raul Gavîrliță (loan return from Metaloglobus București)
—	GK	ROU	Mihai Cotolan (from Voluntari)
—	GK	ROU	Sebastian Moroz (from Odorheiu Secuiesc)
—	MF	ROU	Carlo Danciu (on loan from Gaz Metan Mediaș)
—	MF	ROU	Adelin Dumitrașcu (from Păulești)
—	MF	ROU	Robert Grecu (from Argeș Pitești)
—	MF	ROU	Gabriel Udeanu (from Rapid II București)
—	FW	ROU	Adrian Stoian (from Odorheiu Secuiesc)

Out:

No.	Pos.	Nation	Player
—	MF	ROU	Alexandru Ioniță (loan return to CFR Cluj)
—	GK	ROU	David Lazar (to Universitatea Craiova)
—	DF	ROU	Radu Crișan (to 1599 Șelimbăr, previously on loan to Dunărea Călărași)
—	DF	ROU	Valerică Găman (to Universitatea Craiova)
—	DF	BIH	Daniel Graovac (to CFR Cluj)
—	DF	CMR	Abdel Lamanje (to (Kazakhstan) Shakhter Karagandy)
—	DF	POR	Hugo Sousa (to Sepsi OSK)
—	MF	ROU	Silviu Balaure (to Hermannstadt)
—	MF	ROU	Robert Boboc (to 1599 Șelimbăr, previously on loan to CSM Reșița)
—	MF	FRA	Yann Boé-Kane (to (France) Quevilly-Rouen)
—	MF	CRO	Dario Čanađija (to (Lithuania) Sūduva)
—	MF	CRO	Ljuban Crepulja (to Rapid București)
—	MF	ROU	George Merloi (to Voluntari)
—	MF	ROU	Mihai Răduț (to (Cyprus) Aris Limassol)
—	MF	JPN	Takayuki Seto (to Petrolul Ploiești)
—	MF	ROU	Romario Moise (to Rapid București, previously on loan at Petrolul Ploiești)
—	FW	NGA	Kehinde Fatai (to Free agent)

=== Brașov ===
In:

No.	Pos.	Nation	Player
—	GK	ROU	David Gîrniață (from Gloria Albești)
—	GK	ROU	Cezar Lungu (from Concordia Chiajna)
—	DF	ROU	Vlad Motroc (from Slatina)
—	DF	ROU	Dan Panait (from Farul Constanța)
—	DF	ROU	Alexandru Sabău (from Gloria L.T. Cermei)
—	DF	ROU	Rareș Sburlea (on loan from Kids Tâmpa Brașov, previously on loan at Universitatea Cluj)
—	DF	ROU	Bruno Vasiu (from Deva)
—	MF	MDA	Gheorghe Anton (from Buzău)
—	MF	ROU	Darius Ciopo (from Brașovia Brașov)
—	MF	ROU	George Dragomir (on loan from Sepsi Sfântu Gheorghe)
—	MF	ROU	Răzvan Iorga (on loan from Farul Constanța)
—	MF	ROU	Andrei Lascu (from Olimpic Cetate Râșnov)
—	MF	ROU	Vlad Mihalcea (from Aerostar Bacău)
—	MF	ROU	Alexandru Negrean (on loan from Farul Constanța)
—	MF	ROU	Horia Popa (from SR Brașov)
—	MF	ROU	Iulian Roșu (from Buzău)
—	FW	ROU	Marian Codrea (from Unirea Alba Iulia)
—	FW	MDA	Maxim Iurcu (from Buzău)

Out:

No.	Pos.	Nation	Player
—	DF	ROU	Richárd Aszalos (loan return to Miercurea Ciuc)
—	DF	ROU	David Tălmaciu (loan return to Kid Tâmpa Brașov)
—	FW	ROU	Vlad Boția (loan return to FC U Craiova)
—	GK	ROU	Sebastian Ciuperceanu (to Free agent)
—	GK	ROU	Mihai László (to Free agent)
—	DF	ROU	Bogdan Cîrstian (to Free agent)
—	DF	ROU	Raul Rusu (to Free agent)
—	DF	ROU	Cosmin Stăncuțu (to Free agent)
—	DF	ROU	Raul Toader (to Free agent)
—	MF	ROU	Diego Alupoaie (to Free agent)
—	MF	ROU	Marian Cristescu (to Free agent)
—	MF	ROU	Radu Linguraru (to Free agent)
—	MF	ROU	Marius Manole (to Free agent)
—	MF	ROU	Andrei Negulici (to Free agent)
—	MF	ROU	Ștefan Nicolau (to Free agent)
—	MF	ROU	Ionuț Olaru (to Free agent)
—	MF	ROU	Bogdan Roșu (to Free agent)
—	MF	ROU	Adrian Voicu (to Free agent)
—	FW	ROU	Dorin Argăseală (to Free agent)
—	FW	ROU	Alin Damian (to Free agent)
—	FW	ROU	Cosmin Ivan (to Free agent)
—	FW	ROU	Iulian Nechita (to Free agent)

=== Buzău ===
In:

No.	Pos.	Nation	Player
—	GK	MDA	Cristian Avram (on loan from (Moldova) Petrocub Hîncești)
—	DF	ROU	Flavius David (on loan from FCSB II)
—	DF	MLI	Modibo Keïta (from Ceahlăul Piatra Neamț)
—	DF	COL	Jhon Mondragón (from Petrolul Ploiești)
—	DF	POL	Kamil Wiktorski (from Dunărea Călărași)
—	DF	ROU	Radu Zamfir (on loan from Voluntari II)
—	MF	ROU	Alin Cârstocea (from Dunărea Călărași)
—	MF	ARG	Pablo Gaitán (from Politehnica Iași)
—	MF	URU	Ariel López (from Dunărea Călărași)
—	MF	ROU	Alexandru Munteanu (from Politehnica Timișoara)
—	MF	ROU	Alexandru Neacșu (on loan from FCSB II)
—	MF	ROU	Tudor Oltean (on loan from Gaz Metan Mediaș)
—	MF	ROU	Bogdan Oteliță (from Ceahlăul Piatra Neamț)
—	FW	CMR	Serge Ekollo (on loan from Petrolul Ploiești)
—	FW	MDA	Dumitru Rogac (from (Moldova) Dinamo-Auto Tiraspol)

Out:

No.	Pos.	Nation	Player
—	DF	ROU	Lucian Dumea (loan return to Politehnica Iași)
—	DF	ROU	Gabriel Nedelea (loan return to Viitorul Constanța)
—	DF	ROU	Ciprian Perju (loan return to Viitorul II Constanța, later signed by Unirea Slobozia)
—	DF	ROU	Sergiu Pîrvulescu (loan return to Kids Tâmpa Brașov, later signed by Petrolul Ploiești)
—	FW	ROU	Cosmin Tucaliuc (loan return to Viitorul II Constanța, later signed by Mioveni)
—	GK	ROU	Rareș Șerban (to Free agent)
—	DF	ROU	Marius Ioniță (to Free agent)
—	DF	ROU	Marian Pleșoiu (to Free agent, previously on loan to Râmnicu Sărat)
—	DF	ROU	Alexandru Popescu (to Free agent)
—	MF	MDA	Gheorghe Anton (to Brașov)
—	MF	ROU	Ionuț Baboi (to Free agent, previously on loan to Râmnicu Sărat)
—	MF	ROU	Cristian Balgiu (to Universitatea Cluj)
—	MF	ROU	Mădălin Calu (to Dunărea Călărași, previously on loan)
—	MF	ROU	Matei Constantinescu (to Free agent, previously on loan to Râmnicu Sărat)
—	MF	ROU	Claudiu Ionescu-Racovițeanu (to Free agent)
—	MF	ROU	Paul Pațurcă (to Gaz Metan Mediaș)
—	MF	ROU	Adelin Pîrcălabu (to Free agent)
—	MF	ROU	Cristian Poștoarcă (to Free agent)
—	MF	ROU	Iulian Roșu (to Brașov)
—	MF	ROU	Mădălin Socol (to Free agent)
—	MF	ROU	David Stăiculescu (to Free agent)
—	FW	ROU	Constantin Stoica (to Free agent)
—	FW	MDA	Maxim Iurcu (to Brașov)

=== Concordia Chiajna ===
In:

No.	Pos.	Nation	Player
—	GK	ROU	Daniel Isvoranu (loan return from Tunari)
—	GK	ROU	Georgian Mișu (loan return from Metalul Buzău)
—	FW	ROU	Sergiu Arnăutu (loan return from Petrolul Ploiești)
—	GK	ROU	Marius Aldescu (from Pandurii Târgu Jiu)
—	GK	ROU	Alexandru Silveanu (from Astra II)
—	DF	ROU	Raul Palmeș (from (Hungary) Budapest Honvéd, previously on loan at Miercurea Ciuc)
—	MF	ROU	Marian Anghelina (from FC U Craiova)
—	MF	ROU	Dorin Codrea (from Concordia Chiajna, previously on loan at Poli Timișoara)
—	MF	ROU	Alexandru Dușmanu (on loan from Sport Team București, previously on loan at Cugir)
—	MF	ROU	Nini Popescu (from CSM Reșița)
—	MF	ROU	Florinel Sandu (on loan from Sport Team București)
—	FW	ROU	Valentin Balint (from Petrolul Ploiești)
—	FW	ROU	Adrian Voicu (from FC U Craiova)

Out:

No.	Pos.	Nation	Player
—	DF	ROU	Florin Borța (loan return to Universitatea Craiova)
—	FW	ROU	Theodor Butoiu (loan return to FC Dănuț Coman, later signed by Argeș Pitești)
—	GK	ROU	Alexandru Costache (on loan to Unirea Constanța)
—	GK	ROU	Alexandru Duță (to Dacia Unirea Brăila)
—	GK	ROU	Cezar Lungu (to Brașov)
—	DF	ROU	Alexandru Albu (on loan to Rapid București, previously on loan at UTA Arad)
—	DF	ROU	Nicușor Fota (to Free agent)
—	DF	ROU	Cătălin Oanea (to Free agent)
—	MF	ROU	Alexandru Lazăr (to Free agent)
—	FW	ROU	Andrei Hergheligiu (to Free agent)

=== Dacia Unirea Brăila ===
In:

No.	Pos.	Nation	Player
—	GK	ROU	Alexandru Duță (on loan from Concordia Chiajna)
—	DF	ROU	Alexandru Pătlăgică (on loan from UTA Arad, previously on loan at Crișul Chișineu-Criș)
—	MF	ROU	Aurelian Petrache (on loan from Sport Team București)
—	MF	ROU	Alin Priboi (from CSM Bacău)
—	MF	ROU	Alexandru Taciuc (from Focșani)
—	FW	ROU	Adelin Voinescu (from Voluntari)

Out:

No.	Pos.	Nation	Player
—	DF	ROU	Robert Donzelli (loan return to Sport Team București)
—	GK	ROU	Alin Mihai (to Free agent)
—	GK	ROU	George Tudor (to Free agent)
—	DF	CMR	Patrick Arnaud (to Free agent)
—	DF	ROU	Andrei Bădilaș (to Free agent)
—	DF	ROU	Răzvan Păvălache (to Free agent)
—	DF	ROU	Ștefăniță Sava (to Free agent)
—	MF	ROU	Alexandru Luca (to Free agent)
—	MF	ROU	Rareș Oană (to Free agent)
—	MF	ROU	Silviu Sloată (to Free agent, previously on loan to Sportul Chiscani)
—	MF	ROU	Robert Vâlceanu (to Free agent)
—	FW	CMR	Gabby Batchabi (to Free agent, previously on loan to Viitorul Ianca)
—	FW	ROU	Rareș Cristea (to Free agent, previously on loan to Viitorul Ianca)

=== Dunărea Călărași ===
In:

No.	Pos.	Nation	Player
—	GK	ROU	Alexandru Achiriloaiei (from Popești-Leordeni)
—	GK	ROU	Albert Popa (on loan from Gaz Metan Mediaș)
—	DF	ROU	Costel Avram (from Voluntari II)
—	DF	ROU	Leonard Boiangiu (from Popești-Leordeni)
—	DF	ROU	George Cotigă (from Slatina)
—	DF	ROU	Bogdan Matei (from Minaur Baia Mare)
—	MF	ROU	Mădălin Calu (from Buzău, previously on loan)
—	MF	ROU	Vasile Gheorghe (from Slatina)
—	MF	ROU	Sorin Mănăilă (on loan from Sport Team București)
—	MF	CAY	Elijah Seymour (from Tunari)
—	MF	ROU	Alexandru Stoica (from Farul Constanța)
—	FW	ROU	Andrei Moise (from Academica II Clinceni)
—	FW	ROU	Alexandru Popescu (from Universitatea II Craiova)
—	FW	ROU	Gelu Velici (from Crișul Chișineu-Criș)

Out:

No.	Pos.	Nation	Player
—	DF	ROU	Radu Crișan (loan return to Astra Giurgiu)
—	DF	ROU	Andrei Rus (loan return to Petrolul Ploiești)
—	DF	ROU	Alexandru Sabangeanu (loan return to Viitorul II Constanța)
—	DF	ROU	Alexandru Sîrbu (loan return to Universitatea II Craiova)
—	GK	ROU	Ionuț Alexandru (to Free agent)
—	GK	ROU	Răzvan Began (to Sepsi OSK)
—	GK	AUT	Stefan Krell (to Free agent)
—	DF	POL	Kamil Wiktorski (to Buzău)
—	MF	TOG	Charles Acolatse (to Free agent)
—	MF	MAR	Saifeddine Alami (to Rapid București)
—	MF	ROU	Alin Cârstocea (to Free agent)
—	MF	ROU	Alexandru Ciucur (to Free agent)
—	MF	AUT	Sandro Djurić (to Free agent)
—	MF	URU	Ariel López (to Free agent)
—	MF	ROU	Cristian Pușcaș (to Politehnica Iași)
—	MF	ROU	George Tudoran (to Free agent)
—	FW	ROU	Valentin Alexandru (to Universitatea Cluj)
—	FW	ROU	Cristian Bud (to Free agent)
—	FW	ROU	Costin Petre (to Free agent)

=== Hermannstadt ===
In:

No.	Pos.	Nation	Player
—	FW	CRO	Stjepan Plazonja (loan return from Politehnica Timișoara)
—	GK	ROU	Raul Băila (from Măgura Cisnădie)
—	GK	ROU	Vlad Muțiu (from Universitatea Cluj)
—	DF	ROU	Florin Bejan (from Dinamo București)
—	DF	ROU	Fabrizio Constantin (from Mioveni, previously on loan at Unirea Bascov)
—	DF	ROU	Alexandru Pantea (on loan from FCSB)
—	DF	ROU	Gheorghe Tomșa (on loan from CFR Cluj)
—	MF	ROU	Paul Antoche (from Farul Constanța)
—	MF	ROU	Silviu Balaure (from Astra Giurgiu)
—	MF	ROU	Alexandru Ban (from 1599 Șelimbăr, previously on loan at Măgura Cisnădie)
—	MF	ROU	Andrei Lungu (from Metaloglobus București)
—	MF	ROU	Ionuț Năstăsie (from Argeș Pitești)
—	MF	JPN	Mino Sota (from Metaloglobus București)
—	FW	ROU	Cosmin Bucuroiu (from Unirea Bascov)
—	FW	ROU	Valentin Buhăcianu (from UTA Arad)

Out:

No.	Pos.	Nation	Player
—	GK	ROU	Ionuț Rus (loan return to CFR Cluj, later on loan to Ripensia Timișoara)
—	MF	ESP	David Mayoral (loan return to (Spain) Cádiz)
—	GK	POR	Cristiano (to CFR Cluj)
—	DF	ROU	Claudiu Belu (to Rapid București)
—	DF	ARG	Patricio Matricardi (to Gaz Metan Mediaș)
—	DF	ROU	Adrian Scarlatache (to Mioveni)
—	DF	CIV	Ousmane Viera (to Free agent)
—	MF	GHA	Bright Addae (to Free agent)
—	MF	SYR	Aias Aosman (to Free agent)
—	MF	ROU	Răzvan Dâlbea (Retired)
—	MF	BRA	Romário Pires (to Farul Constanța)
—	MF	FRA	Billal Sebaihi (to Free agent)
—	MF	ROU	Ruben Sumanariu (to Foresta Suceava, previously on loan)
—	FW	CRO	Ante Aralica (to Free agent)
—	FW	CRO	Dražen Bagarić (to Free agent)
—	FW	SUI	Goran Karanović (to Free agent)
—	FW	POR	Yazalde (to Free agent)

=== Metaloglobus București ===
In:

No.	Pos.	Nation	Player
—	MF	ROU	Claudiu Borțoneanu (on loan from Voluntari)

Out:

No.	Pos.	Nation	Player
—	MF	ROU	Radu Chiriac (loan return to Astra II)
—	MF	ROU	Andrei Florescu (loan return to Dinamo II București)
—	MF	ROU	Andrei Lungu (to Hermannstadt)
—	MF	JPN	Mino Sota (to Hermannstadt)
—	FW	ROU	Christo Bolohan (loan return to FCSB II, later on loan to Unirea Slobozia)
—	FW	ROU	Raul Gavîrliță (loan return to Astra II)

=== Miercurea Ciuc ===
In:

No.	Pos.	Nation	Player
—	GK	HUN	Dániel Bordás (loan return from Odorheiu Secuiesc)
—	GK	ROU	Norbert Bencze (loan return from Odorheiu Secuiesc)
—	GK	ROU	Alpár Bartók (loan return from CSM Bacău)
—	GK	ROU	Balázs Dombrádi (loan return from Deva)
—	DF	ROU	Richárd Aszalos (loan return from Corona Brașov)
—	DF	ROU	Csongor Berkeczi (loan return from Odorheiu Secuiesc)
—	DF	ROU	Bence Rácz (loan return from Odorheiu Secuiesc)
—	DF	ROU	Adorján Gyerő (loan return from KSE Târgu Secuiesc)
—	DF	ROU	Csongor Simó (loan return from Odorheiu Secuiesc)
—	DF	ROU	Csanád Marucza (loan return from Odorheiu Secuiesc)
—	DF	ROU	Denis Partene (loan return from Odorheiu Secuiesc)
—	MF	ROU	Norbert Barta (loan return from Odorheiu Secuiesc)
—	MF	ROU	Tibor Csala (loan return from Odorheiu Secuiesc)
—	MF	ROU	Norbert János (loan return from Odorheiu Secuiesc)
—	MF	ROU	Hunor Szfárli (loan return from Odorheiu Secuiesc)
—	MF	ROU	Barna Antal (loan return from KSE Târgu Secuiesc)
—	FW	ROU	Tamás Becze (loan return from KSE Târgu Secuiesc)

Out:

No.	Pos.	Nation	Player
—	DF	HUN	Dávid Kelemen (loan return to (Hungary) Paks)
—	MF	ARG	Juan Bauza (loan return to (Argentina) Colón, later signed by FC U Craiova)
—	FW	ROU	Toni Suciu (loan return to (Hungary) Puskás Akadémia)
—	DF	HUN	Bonifác Csonka (to (Hungary) Győri ETO)
—	MF	ROU	János Botorok (on loan to Sepsi Sfântu Gheorghe)

=== Petrolul Ploiești ===
In:

No.	Pos.	Nation	Player
—	DF	ROU	Dacian Dunca (loan return from Plopeni)
—	DF	ROU	Andrei Rus (loan return from Dunărea Călărași)
—	MF	ROU	Rareș Simionescu (loan return from Plopeni)
—	FW	MLI	Sory Diarra (loan return from Unirea Slobozia)
—	DF	ROU	Sergiu Pîrvulescu (from Kids Tâmpa Brașov, previously on loan at Buzău)
—	MF	ROU	Darius Buia (from Viitorul Târgu Jiu)
—	MF	MDA	Eugeniu Cebotaru (from Academica Clinceni)
—	MF	JPN	Takayuki Seto (from Astra Giurgiu)
—	FW	ROU	Marius Coman (from Universitatea Cluj, previously on loan at Comuna Recea)
—	FW	ROU	Simon Măzărache (from Farul Constanța)

Out:

No.	Pos.	Nation	Player
—	MF	ROU	Vlad Mitrea (loan return to Sepsi OSK)
—	MF	ROU	Romario Moise (loan return to Astra Giurgiu, later signed by Rapid București)
—	FW	ROU	Sergiu Arnăutu (loan return to Concordia Chiajna)
—	GK	ROU	Ștefan Georgescu (to Unirea Dej, previously on loan)
—	GK	BUL	Georgi Kitanov (to Free agent)
—	DF	BEL	Joeri Poelmans (to (Belgium) Lierse)
—	MF	ROU	Vlad Bogdan (on loan to Unirea Dej)
—	MF	ROU	Iulian Ilie (to Free agent, previously on loan to Mostiștea Ulmu)
—	FW	ROU	Valentin Balint (to Concordia Chiajna)
—	FW	ROU	Vasile Buhăescu (to Steaua București)

=== Politehnica Iași ===
In:

No.	Pos.	Nation	Player
—	GK	ROU	Eduard Belibrov (loan return from Gloria Albești)
—	GK	ROU	Denis Ciofu (loan return from Unirea Slobozia)
—	GK	ROU	Adrian Duță (loan return from Dante Botoșani)
—	DF	ROU	Tudor Ciobanu (loan return from Bradu Borca)
—	DF	ROU	Sebastian Cotiugă (loan return from Bradu Borca)
—	DF	ROU	Lucian Dumea (loan return from Buzău)
—	DF	ROU	Vlad Gangal (loan return from Bradu Borca)
—	MF	ROU	Constantin Aeroaiei (loan return from Pașcani)
—	MF	ROU	Denis Iftimie (loan return from Sporting Vaslui)
—	MF	ROU	Alexandru Păvăluc (loan return from Bradu Borca)
—	FW	ROU	Vlad Danale (loan return from Aerostar Bacău)
12	GK	ROU	Laurențiu Popescu (on loan from Universitatea Craiova)
—	DF	ROU	Florin Plămadă (from Botoșani)
—	DF	ROU	Alexandru Stan (from FCSB)
—	MF	ROU	Ion Pop (from Sighetu Marmației)
—	MF	ROU	Cristian Pușcaș (from Dunărea Călărași)
—	MF	ROU	Tiberiu Serediuc (from (Greece) Rodos)
—	MF	ROU	Marian Stoenac (from FC U Craiova)
—	MF	ROU	Marian Târșa (from Botoșani)
—	FW	ROU	Andrei Istrate (on loan from FCSB)

Out:

No.	Pos.	Nation	Player
—	DF	GRE	Nikos Baxevanos (loan return to (Italy) Lazio)
—	GK	ROU	Laurențiu Brănescu (to Farul Constanța)
—	DF	ROU	Sorin Bușu (to Free agent)
—	DF	CPV	Rodny Lopes (to Free agent)
—	DF	ROU	Ovidiu Mihalache (to Free agent)
—	DF	ROU	Răzvan Popa (to Free agent)
—	MF	VEN	Rafael Acosta (to Free agent)
—	MF	ROU	Andreias Calcan (to (Hungary) Mezőkövesd)
—	MF	CRC	Dylan Flores (to Free agent)
—	MF	ARG	Pablo Gaitán (to Free agent)
—	MF	ARG	Manuel de Iriondo (to Free agent)
—	MF	ARG	Juan Pablo Passaglia (to UTA Arad)
—	MF	CPV	Platini (to Free agent)
—	MF	ROU	Doru Popadiuc (to Chindia Târgoviște)
—	MF	ROU	Antonio Stan (to Voluntari)
—	MF	BEL	Floriano Vanzo (to Academica Clinceni)
—	FW	ROU	Andrei Cristea (to Mioveni)
—	FW	MNE	Uroš Đuranović (to Free agent)
—	FW	GHA	Joseph Mensah (to Free agent)
—	FW	BIH	Dženan Zajmović (to (Bosnia and Herzegovina) Velež Mostar)
—	FW	CRC	Deyver Vega (to Free agent)

=== Politehnica Timișoara ===
In:

No.	Pos.	Nation	Player
—	DF	ROU	Dragoș Coroiu (loan return from Dumbrăvița)
—	MF	ROU	Vlad Bâte (loan return from Fortuna Becicherecu Mic)
—	MF	ROU	Ilie Velcan (loan return from Ghiroda)
—	FW	ROU	Răzvan Pițigoi (loan return from Ghiroda)
—	FW	ROU	Demetris Cristodulo (loan return from CSM Reșița)
—	GK	AUS	Harrison Devenish-Meares (from Rapid București)
—	GK	ROU	Robert Popeț (from Poli Timișoara, previously on loan at Dumbrăvița)
—	DF	ROU	Tudor Năstase (from Sporting Liești)
—	MF	ROU	Cosmin Bîrnoi (from Farul Constanța)
—	MF	ROU	Samuel Costea (from Ghiroda)
—	MF	ROU	Roberto Hațegan (from (Germany) 1. FC Nürnberg U19)
—	MF	ROU	Rareș Lazăr (on loan from Rapid București)
—	MF	ROU	Alin Manea (from Universitatea Craiova, previously on loan)
—	MF	ROU	Adrian Zaluschi (from Minaur Baia Mare)
—	FW	ROU	Sebastian Serediuc (from CFR Cluj, previously on loan at Unirea Dej)

Out:

No.	Pos.	Nation	Player
—	GK	ROU	Otto Hindrich (loan return to CFR Cluj)
—	MF	ROU	Dorin Codrea (loan return to Poli Timișoara, later signed by Concordia Chiajna)
—	FW	CRO	Stjepan Plazonja (loan return to Hermannstadt)
—	DF	ROU	Ionuț Coadă (to Unirea Slobozia)
—	DF	ROU	Sergiu Popovici (to Free agent)
—	DF	ROU	Raul Vidrăsan (to Ripensia Timișoara, previously on loan at Unirea Ungheni)
—	MF	ESP	José Casado (to Free agent)
—	MF	ROU	Ionuț Cioinac (to Unirea Constanța)
—	MF	ROU	Petre Ivanovici (to Free agent)
—	MF	ROU	Alexandru Munteanu (to Free agent)
—	MF	ROU	Fabio Trip (to Free agent, previously on loan at Șoimii Lipova)
—	FW	SRB	Pavle Radunović (to Free agent)
—	GK	ROU	Rareș Murariu (to CFR Cluj, previously on loan)

=== Ripensia Timișoara ===
In:

No.	Pos.	Nation	Player
—	GK	ROU	Octavian Moșoarcă (from Poli Timișoara, previously on loan at Ghiroda)
—	GK	ROU	Ionuț Rus (on loan from CFR Cluj, previously on loan at Hermannstadt)
—	DF	ROU	Raul Vidrăsan (from ASU Politehnica Timișoara, previously on loan at Unirea Ungheni)
—	MF	ROU	Răzvan Morariu (from Dumbrăvița)
—	MF	ROU	Andrei Precup (from Ghiroda)
—	FW	LBR	Emmanuel Ernest (from Rapid București)

Out:

No.	Pos.	Nation	Player
—	GK	ROU	Róbert Miklos (loan return to Dumbrăvița)
—	DF	ROU	Cristian Pădurariu (loan return to Poli Timișoara)
—	GK	ROU	Ștefan Dobre (on loan to Academica Clinceni)
—	MF	ROU	Tudor Călin (to UTA Arad)
—	GK	ROU	Valentin Vlecea jr. (to Free agent)
—	DF	ROU	Răzvan Cluci (to Free agent, previously on loan to Ghiroda)
—	MF	ROU	Florin Dobie (to Free agent, previously on loan to Avântul Periam)
—	MF	ROU	Denis Casian (to Free agent, previously on loan to Cugir)
—	MF	ROU	Alexandru Neagu (to Free agent)
—	MF	MAR	Salhi Ouadie (to Free agent, previously on loan to Șoimii Lipova)
—	MF	ROU	Gabriel Stoi (to Free agent)
—	MF	ROU	Vlad Tudorache (to Free agent)
—	FW	ROU	Alexandru Popovici (to Slatina)

=== Steaua București ===
In:

No.	Pos.	Nation	Player
—	MF	ROU	Stephan Drăghici (from Universitatea Craiova, previously on loan at Argeș Pitești)
—	FW	ROU	Vasile Buhăescu (from Petrolul Ploiești)

Out:

No.	Pos.	Nation	Player
—	GK	ROU	Ștefan Mușat (loan return to Viitorul II Constanța)
—	DF	ROU	Antonio Vlad (loan return to Viitorul II Constanța)
—	DF	ROU	Alexandru Udeanu (loan return to Free agent)
—	MF	ROU	Marian Neagu (loan return to Free agent)
—	FW	ROU	Andrei Antohi (loan return to Free agent)
—	FW	ROU	Cezar Mihalache (loan return to Free agent)
—	FW	FRA	Philippe Nsiah (loan return to Free agent)

=== Unirea Constanța ===
In:

No.	Pos.	Nation	Player
—	GK	ROU	Iulian Anca-Trip (from Universitatea Cluj)
—	GK	ROU	Alexandru Costache (on loan from Concordia Chiajna)
—	GK	ROU	Nicușor Grecu (from Slatina)
—	DF	ROU	Robert Băjan (from Farul Constanța)
—	DF	ROU	Iulian Carabela (from Farul Constanța)
—	DF	MDA	Enrichi Finica (on loan from Rapid București)
—	DF	MDA	Cristian Ignat (on loan from Rapid București)
—	DF	ROU	Marius Leca (on loan from Farul Constanța)
—	DF	ROU	Darius Mureșan (on loan from Farul Constanța)
—	DF	ROU	Alexandru Nicola (on loan from FCSB II)
—	DF	ROU	Ionuț Ursu (from Farul Constanța)
—	MF	ROU	Casian Anghel (from (Spain) Leganés B)
—	MF	MDA	Ion Cărăruș (from Farul Constanța)
—	MF	ROU	Robert Căruță (from Free agent)
—	MF	ROU	Ionuț Cioinac (from Politehnica Timișoara)
—	MF	ROU	Robert Jerdea (on loan from Clinceni)
—	MF	ROU	Liviu Mihai (from Farul Constanța)
—	FW	ROU	Andrei Banyoi (from Farul Constanța)
—	FW	ROU	Andreas Chirițoiu (on loan from FCSB II)
—	FW	MDA	Ilie Damașcan (from Farul Constanța)
—	FW	ROU	Dragoș Grigore (from Rapid II București)
—	FW	ROU	Robert Jerdea (on loan from Academica Clinceni)
—	MF	ROU	Adrian Perényi (from Prosport Academy)
—	FW	ROU	Cosmin Zamfir (from Farul Constanța)

Out:

No.	Pos.	Nation	Player

=== Unirea Dej ===
In:

No.	Pos.	Nation	Player
—	GK	ROU	Claudiu Chindriș (from Șomuz Fălticeni)
—	GK	MDA	Dorian Răilean (from Comuna Recea)
—	DF	ROU	Alin Burdeț (from Comuna Recea)
—	DF	ROU	Daniel Pop (on loan from Gaz Metan Mediaș)
—	MF	ROU	Vlad Bogdan (on loan from Petrolul Ploiești)
—	MF	ROU	Cristian Chira (on loan from CFR II Cluj)
—	MF	ROU	Eduard Mészáros (from CFR II Cluj, previously on loan)
—	MF	ROU	Alex Militaru (on loan from CFR II Cluj)
—	FW	ROU	Mircea Manole (from Aerostar Bacău, previously on loan at Ovidiu)
—	FW	ROU	Alexandru Pop (on loan from Farul II Constanța)

Out:

No.	Pos.	Nation	Player
—	DF	ROU	Tudor Vomir (loan return to Universitatea Cluj)
—	MF	ROU	Bogdan Pop (loan return to CFR II Cluj)
—	FW	ROU	Sebastian Serediuc (loan return to CFR Cluj, later on loan at Politehnica Timișoara)
—	GK	ROU	Dorin Farcaș (to Free agent)
—	GK	ROU	Ștefan Georgescu (on loan to Odorheiu Secuiesc, previously signed from Petrolul Ploiești)
—	GK	ROU	Cristian Tudose (to Free agent)
—	DF	ROU	Virgil Sabo (to Free agent)
—	MF	ROU	Cristian Cuzdriorean (to Free agent)
—	MF	ROU	Adrian Farcaș (to Free agent)
—	MF	ROU	Toni Giurgean (to Someșul Dej)
—	MF	ROU	Alexandru Mate (to Free agent)
—	FW	ROU	Adrian Câmpan (to Free agent)
—	FW	ROU	Ciprian Lăcan (to Free agent)

=== Unirea Slobozia ===
In:

No.	Pos.	Nation	Player
—	DF	ROU	Ionuț Ene (loan return from Înainte Modelu)
—	DF	ROU	Ovidiu Stroie (loan return from Recolta Gh. Doja)
—	MF	ROU	Mihai Milotin (loan return from Recolta Gh. Doja)
—	DF	ROU	Ionuț Coadă (from Politehnica Timișoara)
—	DF	ROU	Ciprian Perju (from Viitorul II Constanța, previously on loan at Buzău)
—	MF	ROU	Antonio Cruceru (from Farul Constanța)
—	MF	ROU	Răzvan Greu (from Farul Constanța)
—	FW	ROU	Christo Bolohan (on loan from FCSB II, previously on loan at Metaloglobus București)
—	FW	ROU	Sebastian Ivan (on loan from Mioveni)
—	FW	ROU	Robert Mustacă (on loan from Farul II Constanța, previously signed from Viitorul II Constanța)

Out:

No.	Pos.	Nation	Player
—	GK	ROU	Denis Ciofu (loan return to Politehnica Iași)
—	DF	ROU	Robert Ghiță (loan return to Viitorul II Constanța)
—	DF	ROU	Oktay Özkara (loan return to Voluntari)
—	MF	ROU	Marius Ciobanu (loan return to Academica Clinceni, later signed by Universitatea Cluj)
—	FW	MLI	Sory Diarra (loan return to Petrolul Ploiești)
—	FW	ROU	Andrei Trucă (loan return to FCSB II)
—	MF	ROU	Mihai Adăscăliței (to Free agent)
—	MF	ROU	Andrei Comșa (Retired)
—	MF	ROU	Bogdan Danciu (to Free agent)
—	FW	ROU	Sabin Moldovan (to Ceahlăul Piatra Neamț)
—	FW	ROU	Adrian Răduca (to Free agent)

=== Universitatea Cluj ===
In:

No.	Pos.	Nation	Player
—	DF	ROU	Alexander Trifan (loan return from 1. FC Gloria)
—	DF	ROU	Tudor Vomir (loan return from Unirea Dej)
—	MF	ROU	Alexandru Oltean (loan return from Sănătatea Cluj)
—	MF	ROU	Denis Mâneran (loan return from Unirea Ungheni)
—	MF	ISR	Yaniv Segev (loan return from Aerostar Bacău)
—	MF	ROU	Alexandru Roșca (loan return from Unirea Ungheni)
—	MF	ROU	Șerban Tirla (loan return from Minaur Baia Mare)
—	MF	ROU	Adrian Micaș (loan return from Comuna Recea)
—	MF	ROU	Alin Văsălie (loan return from Comuna Recea)
—	FW	ROU	Mihai Forna (loan return from SCM Zalău)
—	GK	ROU	George Micle (on loan from Argeș Pitești)
—	DF	ROU	Alexandru Gîț (from FC U Craiova)
—	DF	ROU	Costinel Gugu (from FC U Craiova)
—	DF	ROU	Denis Ispas (from FC U Craiova)
—	DF	ROU	Florinel Mitrea (from Chindia Târgoviște)
—	MF	ROU	Cristian Balgiu (from Buzău)
—	MF	ROU	Marius Ciobanu (from Academica Clinceni, previously on loan at Unirea Slobozia)
—	MF	ROU	Dragoș Tescan (from UTA Arad)
—	MF	ROU	Florian Haită (on loan from Farul Constanța)
—	FW	ROU	Valentin Alexandru (from Dunărea Călărași)
—	FW	ROU	Andrei Blejdea (from Dinamo București)
—	FW	ROU	Albert Voinea (from UTA Arad)

Out:

No.	Pos.	Nation	Player
—	DF	ROU	Robert Neciu (loan return to Viitorul Constanța, later signed by Farul Constanța)
—	DF	ROU	Rareș Sburlea (loan return to Kids Tâmpa Brașov, later on loan at Brașov)
—	MF	ROU	Alexandru Negrean (loan return to Viitorul II Constanța)
—	FW	ROU	Alexandru Pop (loan return to Viitorul II Constanța)
—	GK	ROU	Iulian Anca-Trip (to Free agent)
—	GK	ROU	Vlad Muțiu (to Hermannstadt)
—	DF	ROU	Dan Berci (to Free agent)
—	DF	ROU	Srdjan Luchin (to Free agent)
—	DF	ROU	Tudor Telcean (on loan to Argeș Pitești)
—	MF	ALB	Donaldo Açka (to Free agent)
—	MF	ROU	Ioan Filip (to Gaz Metan Mediaș)
—	MF	ROU	Cătălin Ștefănescu (to Free agent)
—	FW	ARG	Lucas Chacana (to Free agent)
—	FW	ROU	Marius Coman (to Petrolul Ploiești, previously on loan at Comuna Recea)
—	FW	ROU	Cristian Gavra (to Academica Clinceni)
—	FW	ISR	Idan Golan (to Free agent)
—	FW	NGA	Derick Ogbu (to Free agent)

=== Viitorul Târgu Jiu ===
In:

No.	Pos.	Nation	Player
—	DF	ROU	Alexandru Core (loan return from Minaur Baia Mare)
—	MF	ROU	Florin Lungu (loan return from Luceafărul Oradea)
—	MF	ROU	Goran Paunchici (loan return from Ghiroda)
—	MF	ROU	Alexandru Dulca (from Reșița)
—	FW	ROU	Ciprian Rus (from UTA Arad)
—	FW	ROU	Vlad Rusu (from Farul Constanța)

Out:

No.	Pos.	Nation	Player
—	MF	ROU	Mihai Lixandru (loan return to FCSB II, later on loan to Gaz Metan Mediaș)
—	MF	ROU	Vlad Șerbănescu (loan return to FCSB II)
—	MF	ROU	Alin Țegle (loan return to Universitatea II Craiova)
—	FW	ROU	Vlad Costea (loan return to Luceafărul Oradea)
—	FW	ROU	Alexandru Enache (loan return to FCSB II)
—	GK	MDA	Denis Rusu (to Universitatea Craiova)
—	DF	ROU	Andrei Dragu (to Botoșani)
—	DF	ROU	Andrei Sin (to Academica Clinceni)
—	MF	ROU	Darius Buia (to Petrolul Ploiești)
—	MF	ROU	Marius Cioiu (to Academica Clinceni)
—	FW	ROU	Andrei Ludușan (to Free agent)
—	FW	ROU	Daniel Paraschiv (to CFR Cluj, later on loan to Voluntari)
