= List of Romanian football transfers winter 2022–23 =

This is a list of Romanian football transfers for the 2022–23 winter transfer window. Only transfers featuring SuperLiga are listed.

== SuperLiga ==
Note: Flags indicate national team as has been defined under FIFA eligibility rules. Players may hold more than one non-FIFA nationality.

=== CFR Cluj ===
In:

No.	Pos.	Nation	Player
7	FW	(Kosovo) KOS	Ermal Krasniqi (from (Kosovo) Ballkani)
8	MF	(Romania) ROU	Robert Filip (from (Italy) Alessandria)
25	DF	(Romania) ROU	Bogdan Țîru (from (Poland) Jagiellonia Białystok)
71	DF	(Romania) ROU	Andrei Peteleu (from (Hungary) Kisvárda)
91	FW	(Croatia) CRO	Anton Maglica (from (Cyprus) APOEL)

Out:

No.	Pos.	Nation	Player
8	MF	(Brazil) BRA	Roger (to (Hungary) Szentlőrinc)
9	FW	(Switzerland) SUI	Cephas Malele (loan return to (Saudi Arabia) Al-Tai)
17	FW	(Spain) ESP	Jefté Betancor (on loan to (Cyprus) Pafos)
20	MF	(Denmark) DEN	Vito Hammershøy-Mistrati (to (Sweden) Norrköping)
70	FW	(Portugal) POR	Zé Gomes (on loan to Universitatea Cluj)
75	MF	(Romania) ROU	Adrian Gîdea (to Politehnica Timișoara)
76	MF	(Mauritania) MTN	Guessouma Fofana (to (France) Nîmes)
94	DF	(Romania) ROU	Cătălin Itu (on loan to Politehnica Iași)
99	FW	(Romania) ROU	Sergiu Buș (on loan to Chindia Târgoviște)
—	GK	(Romania) ROU	Ionuț Rus (on loan to Ripensia Timișoara)
—	FW	(Romania) ROU	Denis Rusu (on loan to Șoimii Lipova, previously on loan at Unirea Ungheni)

=== FCSB ===
In:

No.	Pos.	Nation	Player
22	MF	(Romania) ROU	Deian Sorescu (on loan from (Poland) Raków Częstochowa)

Out:

No.	Pos.	Nation	Player
1	GK	(Romania) ROU	Răzvan Ducan (to Botoșani)
9	FW	(Romania) ROU	Ianis Stoica (on loan to Universitatea Cluj)
13	FW	(Romania) ROU	Andrei Dumiter (to Voluntari)
20	MF	(Romania) ROU	Marco Dulca (to Chindia Târgoviște)
21	DF	(Romania) ROU	Florin Achim (free agent)
22	DF	(Romania) ROU	Radu Boboc (free agent)
29	DF	(Algeria) ALG	Rachid Bouhenna (to (Greece) Ionikos)
30	MF	(Romania) ROU	Alexandru Musi (on loan to Politehnica Iași)
90	FW	(Romania) ROU	Bogdan Rusu (to Mioveni)
—	MF	(Romania) ROU	Ovidiu Perianu (on loan to Chindia Târgoviște, previously on loan at Botoșani)
—	FW	(Romania) ROU	Cristian Dumitru (free agent, previously on loan at Mioveni)

=== Universitatea Craiova ===
In:

No.	Pos.	Nation	Player
12	DF	(Equatorial Guinea) EQG	Basilio Ndong (from (Norway) Start)
14	DF	(Croatia) CRO	Karlo Tomašec (from (Croatia) Rudeš)
15	DF	(Croatia) CRO	Juraj Badelj (from (Croatia) Rudeš)
26	DF	(North Macedonia) MKD	Gjoko Zajkov (from (Ukraine) Vorskla Poltava)
31	MF	(Romania) ROU	Alexandru Ișfan (from Argeș Pitești)
39	DF	(Senegal) SEN	Jean Baptiste Mendy (on loan from Ineu)

Out:

No.	Pos.	Nation	Player
2	DF	(Romania) ROU	Paul Papp (to Petrolul Ploiești)
12	GK	(Moldova) MDA	Denis Rusu (to Gloria Buzău)
14	MF	(Romania) ROU	Eduard Florescu (to Botoșani)
16	MF	(Romania) ROU	Dan Nistor (to Universitatea Cluj)
27	DF	(Switzerland) SUI	Ivan Martić (on loan to Universitatea Cluj)
37	MF	(Romania) ROU	Marian Danciu (on loan to Slatina)
87	GK	(Lithuania) LTU	Giedrius Arlauskis (free agent)

=== Voluntari ===
In:

No.	Pos.	Nation	Player
2	DF	(Argentina) ARG	Cristian Paz (from (Argentina) Deportivo Morón)
13	FW	(Romania) ROU	Andrei Dumiter (from FCSB)
16	MF	(Iceland) ISL	Rúnar Már Sigurjónsson (free agent)
80	FW	(Ivory Coast) CIV	Aymar Meleke (from (Ivory Coast) SOA)

Out:

No.	Pos.	Nation	Player
2	DF	(Romania) ROU	Cosmin Achim (to Petrolul Ploiești)
16	MF	(Mexico) MEX	Omar Govea (on loan to (Mexico) Monterrey)
19	DF	(Romania) ROU	Salvatore Marrone (loan return to Csíkszereda)
21	MF	(Romania) ROU	Alexandru Ilie (on loan to Afumați)
97	MF	(Romania) ROU	Nicolas Popescu (to Farul Constanța)

=== Farul Constanța ===
In:

No.	Pos.	Nation	Player
5	DF	(Ivory Coast) CIV	Kévin Boli (from Botoșani)
11	FW	(Brazil) BRA	Mateus Santos (from Botoșani)
23	DF	(Lithuania) LTU	Rolandas Baravykas (free agent)
45	DF	(Brazil) BRA	Gustavo Marins (from (Brazil) Grêmio)
98	MF	(Romania) ROU	Nicolas Popescu (from Voluntari)

Out:

No.	Pos.	Nation	Player
11	FW	(Romania) ROU	Gabriel Torje (to (Turkey) Gençlerbirliği)
20	DF	(Romania) ROU	Romario Benzar (to UTA Arad)
23	MF	(Romania) ROU	Robert Ion (to Politehnica Iași)
45	DF	(France) FRA	Jérémy Corinus (to Chindia Târgoviște)
79	DF	(Belgium) BEL	Ayrton Mboko (to Botoșani)
80	FW	(Romania) ROU	Alexi Pitu (to (France) Bordeaux)
99	FW	(Romania) ROU	Robert Moldoveanu (to Petrolul Ploiești)
—	MF	(Romania) ROU	Răzvan Matiș (on loan to Unirea Dej, previously on loan at Gloria Buzău)
—	MF	(Romania) ROU	Robert Mustacă (on loan to Unirea Slobozia, previously on loan at Concordia Chiajna)

=== Argeș Pitești ===
In:

No.	Pos.	Nation	Player
7	FW	(Portugal) POR	Boubacar Hanne (from (Portugal) Gil Vicente)
11	MF	(Martinique) MTQ	Wesley Jobello (from UTA Arad)
12	GK	(Romania) ROU	Sebastian Micu (on loan from Brașov)
21	MF	(Romania) ROU	David Croitoru (free agent)
22	DF	(Argentina) ARG	Facundo Rizzi (from (Argentina) Gimnasia Jujuy)
28	FW	(Republic of the Congo) CGO	Kévin Koubemba (from (Ukraine) Chornomorets Odesa)
43	DF	(Brazil) BRA	Brendon (from (Vietnam) Ho Chi Minh City)
44	DF	(Canada) CAN	Zorhan Bassong (from (Canada) Montréal)
80	MF	(Romania) ROU	Andrei Tîrcoveanu (from Botoșani)
88	MF	(Guinea-Bissau) GNB	Mimito Biai (from (Bulgaria) Cherno More)
95	DF	(Croatia) CRO	Mario Zebić (from (Poland) Korona Kielce)

Out:

No.	Pos.	Nation	Player
3	DF	(Romania) ROU	Iasmin Latovlevici (free agent)
7	MF	(Bulgaria) BUL	Martin Raynov (to (Bulgaria) Lokomotiv Sofia)
11	MF	(Romania) ROU	Alexandru Ișfan (to Universitatea Craiova)
12	GK	(Romania) ROU	Alexandru Greab (to Mioveni)
13	FW	(Romania) ROU	Alexandru Florescu (on loan to Vedița Colonești)
21	MF	(Haiti) HAI	Bryan Alceus (on loan to (Cyprus) Olympiakos Nicosia)
77	MF	(Romania) ROU	Răzvan Covaci (on loan to Jiul Petroșani)
92	DF	(Democratic Republic of the Congo) COD	Mike Cestor (to (Poland) Radomiak Radom)
—	GK	(Romania) ROU	Andrei Bucur (on loan to Unirea Ungheni, previously on loan at Ceahlăul Piatra Neamț)
—	MF	(Romania) ROU	Vlad Domșa (on loan to Unirea Alba Iulia, previously on loan at CSU Alba Iulia)
—	FW	(Romania) ROU	Cătălin Barbu (to Vedița Colonești, previously on loan at Crișul Chișineu)

=== Sepsi OSK ===
In:

No.	Pos.	Nation	Player
67	MF	(Albania) ALB	Enriko Papa (on loan from (Turkey) Çaykur Rizespor)

Out:

No.	Pos.	Nation	Player
7	MF	(Romania) ROU	George Dragomir (to Botoșani)
21	MF	(Romania) ROU	Cristian Bărbuț (to Hermannstadt)
90	FW	(Romania) ROU	Cătălin Golofca (to Botoșani)

=== Botoșani ===
In:

No.	Pos.	Nation	Player
3	DF	(France) FRA	Gabriel Mutombo (from (France) Troyes)
5	MF	(Romania) ROU	Gabriel Niculescu (from (Germany) VfB Stuttgart youth)
8	MF	(Romania) ROU	Eduard Florescu (from Universitatea Craiova)
9	FW	(Romania) ROU	Cătălin Golofca (from Sepsi OSK)
14	DF	(Belgium) BEL	Ayrton Mboko (from Farul Constanța)
22	DF	(Ivory Coast) CIV	Junior Tallo (from (Hungary) Újpest)
24	MF	(Romania) ROU	Marius Cioiu (from Petrolul Ploiești)
27	MF	(Romania) ROU	George Dragomir (from Sepsi OSK)
28	DF	(Malawi) MWI	Charles Petro (from (Moldova) Sheriff Tiraspol)
40	DF	(Nigeria) NGA	Junior Pius (free agent)
68	GK	(Romania) ROU	Răzvan Ducan (from FCSB)
97	FW	(Romania) ROU	Andrei Burlacu (from Mioveni)

Out:

No.	Pos.	Nation	Player
2	DF	(Netherlands) NED	Shaquill Sno (to Mioveni)
7	MF	(North Macedonia) MKD	Petar Petkovski (to Concordia Chiajna)
8	MF	(Romania) ROU	Marian Obedeanu (to Unirea Constanța)
9	FW	(Brazil) BRA	Mateus Santos (to Farul Constanța)
10	MF	(Romania) ROU	Andrei Tîrcoveanu (to Argeș Pitești)
16	MF	(Israel) ISR	Elad Shahaf (to (Israel) Ashdod)
18	MF	(Romania) ROU	Ovidiu Perianu (loan return to FCSB)
21	DF	(Ivory Coast) CIV	Kévin Boli (to Farul Constanța)
22	MF	(Argentina) ARG	Franco Mussis (to (Italy) Montevarchi)
25	MF	(Mali) MLI	Yacouba Sylla (to (Belgium) Virton)
82	GK	(Romania) ROU	Andrei Ureche (on loan to Brașov)
—	DF	(Romania) ROU	Adrian Moescu (on loan to Ceahlăul Piatra Neamț, previously on loan at Dante Botoșani)

=== Rapid București ===
In:

No.	Pos.	Nation	Player
35	MF	(France) FRA	Hervin Ongenda (from (Cyprus) Apollon Limassol)
70	FW	(Nigeria) NGA	Funsho Bamgboye (from (Hungary) Fehérvár)

Out:

No.	Pos.	Nation	Player
16	FW	(Romania) ROU	Alexandru Despa (on loan to Progresul Spartac)
28	MF	(Romania) ROU	Alexandru Mățan (loan return to (United States) Columbus Crew)
71	FW	(Slovakia) SVK	Jakub Vojtuš (to Politehnica Iași)

=== U Craiova ===
In:

No.	Pos.	Nation	Player
7	MF	(Brazil) BRA	Giovanni (from (Brazil) Cruzeiro, previously on loan at (Brazil) Sport Recife)
14	DF	(Netherlands) NED	Danny Henriques (from (Portugal) Belenenses SAD)
16	DF	(Brazil) BRA	Matheus Mascarenhas (from (Brazil) Confiança)
74	MF	(Romania) ROU	Marius Ciobanu (from Unirea Slobozia)

Out:

No.	Pos.	Nation	Player
7	FW	(Romania) ROU	Gabriel Iancu (loan return to (Russia) Akhmat Grozny)
14	DF	(Greece) GRE	Kyriakos Papadopoulos (free agent)
22	GK	(Romania) ROU	Mario Enache (to Filiași)
27	DF	(Romania) ROU	Ricardo Grigore (loan return to Dinamo București)
—	MF	(Romania) ROU	Alexandru Raicea (on loan to Viitorul Târgu Jiu, previously on loan at Șelimbăr)

=== UTA Arad ===
In:

No.	Pos.	Nation	Player
2	DF	(Romania) ROU	Romario Benzar (from Farul Constanța)
9	FW	(Montenegro) MNE	Stefan Milošević (from (Montenegro) Budućnost Podgorica)
10	FW	(Brazil) BRA	Willie (from (Bolivia) Wilstermann)
11	MF	(Brazil) BRA	Roger (from (Hungary) Szentlőrinc)
13	GK	(Ukraine) UKR	Danylo Kucher (from (Ukraine) Inhulets Petrove)
24	FW	(Romania) ROU	Patrick Pășcălău (on loan from Crișul Chișineu)
32	DF	(Romania) ROU	Salvatore Marrone (on loan from (Hungary) Csíkszereda, previously on loan at Voluntari)

Out:

No.	Pos.	Nation	Player
8	MF	(Romania) ROU	Florentin Matei (free agent)
9	FW	(Switzerland) SUI	Orhan Ademi (to (Germany) VfB Oldenburg)
11	MF	(Martinique) MTQ	Wesley Jobello (to Argeș Pitești)
27	FW	(Nigeria) NGA	Joseph Godwin (on loan to Gloria Buzău)
98	DF	(Romania) ROU	Cristian Maxim (on loan to Mediaș)
—	GK	(Romania) ROU	Alexandru Roșca (on loan to Șelimbăr)
—	MF	(Romania) ROU	Tudor Călin (loan return to Ripensia)

=== Mioveni ===
In:

No.	Pos.	Nation	Player
2	DF	(Netherlands) NED	Shaquill Sno (from Botoșani)
4	DF	(Central African Republic) CTA	Dylan Mboumbouni (from (Norway) Jerv)
11	MF	(Belgium) BEL	Amine Benchaib (from (Belgium) Kortrijk)
12	GK	(Romania) ROU	Alexandru Greab (from Argeș Pitești)
14	MF	(Estonia) EST	Brent Lepistu (from (Estonia) Levadia)
19	FW	(Guinea) GUI	Amadou Diallo (from (Norway) Jerv)
21	DF	(Brazil) BRA	Marquinhos Pedroso (from (Latvia) Liepāja)
90	FW	(Romania) ROU	Bogdan Rusu (from FCSB)

Out:

No.	Pos.	Nation	Player
4	DF	(Romania) ROU	Cornel Ene (to FC Hermannstadt)
11	DF	(Romania) ROU	Răzvan Trif (to Universitatea Cluj)
14	FW	(Romania) ROU	Tiberiu Coman (to Vedița Colonești)
18	FW	(Romania) ROU	Cristian Dumitru (loan return to FCSB)
19	MF	(Romania) ROU	Vlad Mitrea (to Unirea Constanța)
21	DF	(Romania) ROU	Alexandru Iacob (to Minaur Baia Mare)
22	GK	(Romania) ROU	Iustin Popescu (to Concordia Chiajna)
26	DF	(Romania) ROU	Dorinel Oancea (to Universitatea Cluj)
80	MF	(Romania) ROU	Emanuel Dat (to Sighetu Marmației)
89	FW	(Romania) ROU	Ștefan Blănaru (to Brașov)
90	FW	(Romania) ROU	Andrei Burlacu (to Botoșani)
99	FW	(Democratic Republic of the Congo) COD	Junior Kabananga (to (Kazakhstan) Maktaaral)
—	GK	(Romania) ROU	Andrei Dumitru (on loan to Rapid Brodoc)

=== Chindia Târgoviște ===
In:

No.	Pos.	Nation	Player
8	MF	(Romania) ROU	Marco Dulca (from FCSB)
16	MF	(Romania) ROU	Ovidiu Perianu (on loan from FCSB, previously on loan at Botoșani)
29	FW	(Romania) ROU	Sergiu Buș (on loan from CFR Cluj)
91	DF	(France) FRA	Jérémy Corinus (from Farul Constanța)

Out:

No.	Pos.	Nation	Player
3	DF	(Romania) ROU	Constantin Dima (free agent)
4	MF	(Argentina) ARG	Juan Pablo Passaglia (to (Argentina) Agropecuario)
13	FW	(Romania) ROU	Cristian Cherchez (free agent)
42	MF	(France) FRA	Aly Ndom (to (Italy) Viterbese)

=== Petrolul Ploiești ===
In:

No.	Pos.	Nation	Player
4	DF	(Romania) ROU	Paul Papp (from Universitatea Craiova)
6	MF	(Brazil) BRA	Jefferson Júnior (free agent)
19	FW	(Romania) ROU	Robert Moldoveanu (from Farul Constanța)
25	MF	(Serbia) SRB	Stefan Purtić (from (Serbia) Voždovac)
27	DF	(Romania) ROU	Ricardo Grigore (on loan from Dinamo București, previously on loan at U Craiova)
37	DF	(Ivory Coast) CIV	Seniko Doua (from (Ivory Coast) SOA)
—	MF	(Ivory Coast) CIV	Ismaël Diomandé (free agent)
—	DF	(Romania) ROU	Cosmin Achim (from Voluntari)

Out:

No.	Pos.	Nation	Player
1	GK	(Romania) ROU	Sebastian Moroz (to Unirea Constanța)
15	DF	(Romania) ROU	Alberto Olaru (to Metaloglobus)
17	FW	(Romania) ROU	Cătălin Tolea (on loan to Pucioasa)
22	FW	(North Macedonia) MKD	Mirko Ivanovski (to Concordia Chiajna)
24	MF	(Romania) ROU	Marius Cioiu (to Botoșani)
36	DF	(Romania) ROU	Juan Pătrașcu (on loan to Păulești)
37	MF	(Moldova) MDA	Eugeniu Cebotaru (retired)
67	DF	(Romania) ROU	Mihai Velisar (on loan to Concordia Chiajna)
93	FW	(Romania) ROU	Simon Măzărache (to Muscelul Câmpulung)
—	DF	(Romania) ROU	Cosmin Achim (free agent)
—	FW	(Mali) MLI	Sory Ibrahim Diarra (to (Norway) Haugesund)

=== Hermannstadt ===
In:

No.	Pos.	Nation	Player
9	FW	(Romania) ROU	Gabriel Iancu (on loan from (Russia) Akhmat Grozny, previously on loan at U Craiova)
10	MF	(Germany) GER	Vesel Limaj (from (Albania) Tirana)
20	MF	(Romania) ROU	Cristian Bărbuț (from Sepsi OSK)
24	DF	(Romania) ROU	Vlăduț Popa (from Alba Iulia)
70	DF	(Romania) ROU	Cornel Ene (from Mioveni)

Out:

No.	Pos.	Nation	Player
9	FW	(Romania) ROU	Ioan Hora (to Lotus Băile Felix)
10	MF	(Romania) ROU	Ionuț Năstăsie (to Șelimbăr)
13	MF	(Romania) ROU	Alexandru Răuță (to (Saudi Arabia) Ohod)
21	FW	(Romania) ROU	Cosmin Bucuroiu (on loan to Unirea Bascov)
92	DF	(Romania) ROU	Benjamin Hanzu (on loan to Tunari)
—	MF	(Romania) ROU	Alexandru Dușmanu (on loan to Unirea Ungheni, previously on loan at Flacăra Horezu)

=== Universitatea Cluj ===
In:

No.	Pos.	Nation	Player
7	FW	(Romania) ROU	Ianis Stoica (on loan from FCSB)
19	MF	(Romania) ROU	Dan Nistor (from Universitatea Craiova)
21	FW	(Portugal) POR	Zé Gomes (on loan from CFR Cluj)
22	DF	(Bulgaria) BUL	Ivan Goranov (from (Greece) Lamia)
24	DF	(Romania) ROU	Răzvan Trif (from Mioveni)
26	DF	(Romania) ROU	Dorinel Oancea (from Mioveni)
71	DF	(Switzerland) SUI	Ivan Martić (on loan from Universitatea Craiova)

Out:

No.	Pos.	Nation	Player
4	DF	(Poland) POL	Krystian Nowak (to (Republic of Ireland) Bohemians)
5	DF	(Romania) ROU	Marius Briceag (to (Poland) Korona Kielce)
15	MF	(Romania) ROU	Rareș Scocîlcă (on loan to Oțelul Galați)
20	MF	(Romania) ROU	Florin Purece (to (Poland) Termalica Nieciecza)
24	DF	(Italy) ITA	Roberto Romeo (to Csíkszereda)
—	DF	(Romania) ROU	Florinel Mitrea (to Șelimbăr)
—	GK	(Romania) ROU	Laurențiu Brănescu (free agent)
—	DF	(Romania) ROU	Tudor Vomir (on loan to Unirea Ungheni, previously on loan at Unirea Dej)
—	GK	(Romania) ROU	Dragoș Jisa (on loan to Jiul Petroșani, previously on loan at Metalurgistul Cugir)
—	MF	(Romania) ROU	Vlad Moraru (on loan to Ripensia, previously on loan at Zalău)

== See also ==
- 2022–23 SuperLiga
