= Mircea Stan =

Romanian footballer

Personal information
- Full name: Mircea Valerică Stan
- Date of birth: 3 August 1977 (age 49)
- Place of birth: Bucharest, Romania
- Height: 1.73 m (5 ft 8 in)
- Position: Defender

Youth career
- CSȘ Aripi Pitești

Senior career*
Years	Team	Apps	(Gls)
1995–1997	Universitatea Cluj	45	(4)
1998–2000	Farul Constanța	111	(6)
2000–2001	Argeș Pitești	30	(2)
2002–2003	Brașov	37	(4)
2003–2004	Argeș Pitești	31	(2)
2005–2006	Zimbru Chișinău	40	(6)
2006–2010	Argeș Pitești	76	(3)
2010–2011	Mioveni	2	(0)
Total		372	(27)

Managerial career
- 2021–2025: Vedița Colonești
- * Club domestic league appearances and goals as of 15 May 2021

Mircea Valerică Stan (born 3 August 1977) is a former Romanian footballer who played as a right back. His son, Antonio Stan, is also a footballer.

Stadionul Mircea Stan in Colonești, Olt is named after him.

== Honours ==
=== Manager ===
Vedița Colonești

- Liga III: 2020–21
