= Antonio Stan =

Romanian footballer

Personal information
- Full name: Antonio Mihai Stan
- Date of birth: 3 October 2000 (age 26)
- Place of birth: Pitești, Romania
- Height: 1.76 m (5 ft 9 in)
- Position: Midfielder

Youth career
- –2017: Centrul de Juniori "Leonte Ianovschi"

Senior career*
| Years | Team | Apps | (Gls) |
| 2017–2020 | Vedița Colonești | | |
| 2018–2019 | → Unirea Bascov (loan) | | |
| 2019 | → FC U Craiova (loan) | 3 | (0) |
| 2020 | → Argeș Pitești (loan) | 0 | (0) |
| 2020–2021 | Politehnica Iași | 18 | (0) |
| 2021–2024 | Voluntari II | 22 | (1) |
| 2023–2024 | → Vedița Colonești (loan) | 40 | (7) |
| 2024–2025 | Vedița Colonești | 15 | (6) |
- * Club domestic league appearances and goals as of 12:55, 21 December 2024 (UTC)

Antonio Mihai Stan (born 3 October 2000) is a Romanian professional footballer who plays as a midfielder. He also played for clubs such as Vedița Colonești, Unirea Bascov, FC U Craiova 1948 or Politehnica Iași.

== Personal life ==
Antonio is the nephew of Nicolae Stan (Mayor of Colonești) and the son of Mircea Stan, a former top-flight player.
