= Stadionul Mircea Stan =

Stadium in Colonești, Romania

- Interactive map of Stadionul Mircea Stan
- Former names: Stadionul Comunal (1982–2018)
- Address: DN65
- Location: Colonești, Romania
- Coordinates: 44°38′08.2″N 24°40′32.9″E
- Owner: Commune of Colonești
- Capacity: 500 (200 seated)
- Surface: Grass

Construction
- Opened: 1982
- Renovated: 2012–2013, 2018–2019

Tenants
- Vedița Colonești (1982–2025); Petrolul Potcoava (2020–present)

Stadionul Mircea Stan is a multi-purpose stadium in Colonești, Romania, that is currently used mostly for football matches. The former home ground of the Romanian soccer club Vedița Colonești, it has a capacity of 500 people (200 seated).

The stadium is named after Mircea Stan, a former footballer in the Romanian Liga I and the son of the Nicolae Stan, the current mayor of Colonești.
