= Aleksa Marković =

Aleksa Marković may refer to:

- Aleksa Marković (Austrian footballer) (born 2001)
- Aleksa Marković (Canadian soccer) (born 1997)
