= Albert Popa =

Romanian footballer

Personal information
- Full name: Albert Ionuț Popa
- Date of birth: 5 April 1999 (age 27)
- Place of birth: Brașov, Romania
- Height: 1.82 m (6 ft 0 in)
- Position: Goalkeeper

Team information
- Current team: Gloria Buzău
- Number: 29

Youth career
- FC Brașov
- Ardealul Cluj

Senior career*
Years	Team	Apps	(Gls)
2017	Dacia Unirea Brăila	4	(0)
2017–2018	Unirea Slobozia	1	(0)
2018–2019	SR Brașov	32	(0)
2019–2022	Gaz Metan Mediaș	1	(0)
2021–2022	→ Dunărea Călărași (loan)	8	(0)
2022	Odorheiu Secuiesc	12	(0)
2022–2023	Gloria Buzău	0	(0)
2023	SR Brașov	?	(?)
2023–	Kids Tâmpa	0	(0)
- * Club domestic league appearances and goals as of 07:36, 21 June 2022 (UTC)

Albert Ionuț Popa (born 5 April 1999) is a Romanian professional footballer who plays as a goalkeeper for Liga III side Gloria Buzău. Popa made his debut at senior level in the Liga II for Dacia Unirea Brăila, then playing in the third tier for Unirea Slobozia and SR Brașov, before signing with Gaz Metan.

== Honours ==
Odorheiu Secuiesc

- Liga III: 2021–22
