= Tiberiu Coman =

Romanian professional footballer

Personal information
- Full name: Tiberiu Mihai Coman
- Date of birth: 4 January 2002 (age 24)
- Place of birth: Bucharest, Romania
- Height: 1.82 m (6 ft 0 in)
- Position: Forward

Team information
- Current team: Mioveni (on loan from Star Sport Argeș)
- Number: 14

Youth career
- Viitorul Argeș
- Metropolitan București
- –2020: Rapid București

Senior career*
Years	Team	Apps	(Gls)
2019–2021	Rapid II București	2	(0)
2020	→ Unirea Bascov (loan)	16	(1)
2021	→ Mioveni (loan)	3	(1)
2021–2023	Star Sport Argeș	1	(0)
2021	→ Argeș II Pitești (loan)	11	(1)
2021–2023	→ Mioveni (loan)	1	(0)
2021–2023	→ Mioveni II (loan)	10	(3)
2023–	Vedița Colonești	0	(0)
- * Club domestic league appearances and goals as of 09:38, 6 October 2022 (UTC)

Tiberiu Mihai Coman (born 4 January 2002), is a Romanian professional footballer who plays as forward for Liga I side CS Mioveni, on loan from Star Sport Argeș. In his career, Coman also played for Rapid II București, Unirea Bascov or FC Argeș II Pitești.
