= Alex Negrea =

Romanian footballer

Personal information
- Full name: Alex Tudor Negrea
- Date of birth: 1 October 1998 (age 28)
- Place of birth: Satu Mare, Romania
- Height: 1.77 m (5 ft 10 in)
- Position: Left back

Team information
- Current team: Unirea Dej (on loan from Hermannstadt)
- Number: 98

Youth career
- FC Augsburg

Senior career*
Years	Team	Apps	(Gls)
2017–2019	Augsburg II	8	(0)
2019–2021	Chindia Târgoviște	7	(0)
2021–2022	Șimleu Silvaniei		
2022–	Hermannstadt	0	(0)
2022–2023	→ Satu Mare (loan)	14	(1)
2023–	→ Unirea Dej (loan)	12	(0)

International career^{‡}
	Romania U18	0	(0)
2016	Romania U19	2	(0)
- * Club domestic league appearances and goals as of 23:07, 15 August 2022 (UTC) ‡ National team caps and goals as of 2016

Alex Negrea (born 1 October 1998) is a Romanian professional footballer who plays as a left back for Liga II club Unirea Dej, on loan from FC Hermannstadt.

== Club career ==
=== Early career ===
Negrea started his career in the academy of Augsburg.Over time he was promoted in the under-17 team in 2014, in the under-19 team in 2015 where he played 25 matches and gave 1 assist and in 2017, he was promoted in the reserve team where he managed to make 8 appearances before leaving the club in 2019.

=== Chindia Târgoviște ===
On 22 November 2019, Negrea joined his natal country team Chindia Târgoviște in the Liga I. He had only managed to make only 7 appearances in the two seasons he spent with Chindia Târgoviște in Liga I.

=== Sportul Șimleu ===
On 22 July 2021, Negrea joined Liga III club Sportul Șimleu.

=== Hermannstadt ===
On 4 February 2022, Negrea signed for Liga II club Hermannstadt on a free transfer.

=== Satu Mare ===
In the summer of 2022, Negrea joined Liga III club Satu Mare.
