= Raul Gavîrliță =

Romanian footballer

Personal information
- Full name: Raul Ștefan Gavîrliță
- Date of birth: 18 August 1999 (age 27)
- Place of birth: Brașov, Romania
- Height: 1.80 m (5 ft 11 in)
- Position: Forward

Team information
- Current team: Odorheiu Secuiesc
- Number: 10

Youth career
- 2008–2011: Brașov
- 2009: → CF Predeal (loan)
- 2012–2014: Forex Brașov
- 2015–2017: Colțea Brașov

Senior career*
| Years | Team | Apps | (Gls) |
| 2018–2022 | Astra Giurgiu | 16 | (1) |
| 2020–2021 | → Metaloglobus (loan) | 13 | (0) |
| 2022– | Odorheiu Secuiesc | 63 | (29) |
- * Club domestic league appearances and goals as of 18:45, 27 December 2024 (UTC)

Raul Ștefan Gavîrliță (born 18 August 1999) is a Romanian professional footballer who plays as a forward for AFC Odorheiu Secuiesc.

== Honours ==
Astra Giurgiu

- Cupa României: Runner-up 2018–19
