= Robert Jerdea =

Romanian footballer

Personal information
- Full name: Robert Dumitru Jerdea
- Date of birth: 28 September 2003 (age 23)
- Place of birth: Drobeta-Turnu Severin, Romania
- Height: 1.72 m (5 ft 8 in)
- Positions: Attacking midfielder; forward

Team information
- Current team: Petrolul Ploiești
- Number: 11

Youth career
- 2010–2015: Luceafărul Drobeta-Turnu Severin
- 2015–2016: US Affrico
- 2016–2017: CF Gandía
- 2017: Luceafărul Drobeta-Turnu Severin
- 2017–2020: FCSB
- 2020: Prosport Academy
- 2020–2021: Academica Clinceni

Senior career*
Years	Team	Apps	(Gls)
2021–2022	Academica Clinceni	8	(1)
2021	→ Unirea Constanța (loan)	10	(0)
2022–2024	CSM Alexandria	43	(10)
2024–2026	CSM Reșița	41	(12)
2026–	Petrolul Ploiești	7	(1)
- * Club domestic league appearances and goals as of 6 September 2026

Robert Dumitru Jerdea (born 28 September 2003) is a Romanian professional footballer who plays as an attacking midfielder or a forward for Liga I club Petrolul Ploiești.

== Club career ==
=== Academica Clinceni ===
He made his league debut on 22 April 2021 in Liga I match against FCSB.

== Honours ==
CSM Alexandria

- Liga III: 2022–23
