= FC Viitorul II Constanța =

Romanian football club

Viitorul II Constanța
- Full name: Fotbal Club Viitorul II Constanța
- Nickname(s): Puștii lui Hagi (Hagi's Kids)
- Short name: Viitorul II
- Founded: 2014; 2020 (refounded)
- Dissolved: 2021
- Ground: Viitorul (2nd ground)
- Capacity: 1,000
- 2020–21: Liga III, Seria III, 5th
- Website: https://www.academiahagi.ro/
Home colours	Away colours	Third colours

Fotbal Club Viitorul II Constanța, commonly known as Viitorul II Constanța (Romanian pronunciation: [vi.iˈtorul doj konˈstantsa]) or simply Viitorul II, was the reserve squad of Romanian first league side, Viitorul Constanța.

== History ==
The team was founded in the summer of 2014 from the desire to have a team of seniors where the players who just finished the youth academy can be accommodated with the level of seniors in the idea of being subsequently promoted to the first team. The team was enrolled in Liga IV – Constanța County where it was crowned as champion after just one season, winning the league with only victories on the line. The team qualified for the Liga III promotion play-off where they won again without emotions, 7–1 on aggregate against Granitul Babadag, Tulcea County champions.

2015–16 Liga III season, first for the second team of Viitorul Constanța in the Liga III, was a tough one and the team finished only on 8th place. On the other hand, 2016–17 Liga III season was a better one for Hagi's Kids who finished on 4th place at only 5 points distance from the second place.

The project was already a successful one and a lot of Viitorul II players were promoted by Gheorghe Hagi to the first team, which also was crowned champion of Romania for the first time in its history at the end of 2016–17 season. Also the under 19 team of Viitorul had great results in European Competitions.

The club was dissolved in the summer of 2021, after the merge between FC Viitorul Constanța and Farul Constanța and replaced by Farul II Constanța.

== Grounds ==
The club played its home matches on Orășenesc Stadium from Ovidiu, stadium used also by the first team until 2012 when it promoted to Liga I. Since the re-foundation of the second team in 2020, it started to play the matches on the second ground of the Viitorul Stadium.

== Honours ==
=== Leagues ===
- Liga IV – Constanța County
  - Winners (1): 2014–15

=== Cups ===
- Cupa României – Constanța County
  - Winners (1): 2014–15
