= Alexandru Luca =

Romanian professional footballer

Personal information
- Full name: Alexandru Florin Luca
- Date of birth: 26 April 2004 (age 22)
- Place of birth: Sibiu, Romania
- Height: 1.81 m (5 ft 11 in)
- Position: Midfielder

Team information
- Current team: 1599 Șelimbăr
- Number: 33

Youth career
- 2010–2020: Interstar Sibiu

Senior career*
| Years | Team | Apps | (Gls) |
| 2020–2021 | Măgura Cisnădie | | |
| 2021–2024 | 1599 Șelimbăr | 50 | (3) |
| 2024–2026 | Hermannstadt | 1 | (0) |
| 2024 | → ACS Mediaș (loan) | | |
| 2025–2026 | → 1599 Șelimbăr (loan) | 36 | (2) |
| 2026– | 1599 Șelimbăr | 12 | (0) |

International career^{‡}
| 2021 | Romania U20 | 1 | (0) |
- * Club domestic league appearances and goals as of 31 October 2026 ‡ National team caps and goals as of 10 September 2024

Alexandru Florin Luca (born 26 April 2004) is a Romanian professional footballer who plays as a midfielder for Liga II club 1599 Șelimbăr.
