= Simo Rrumbullaku =

Albanian footballer (born 1991)

Simo Rumbullaku
Personal information
- Date of birth: 30 December 1991 (age 34)
- Place of birth: Gjirokastër, Albania
- Height: 1.74 m (5 ft 9 in)
- Position: Left-back

Youth career
- –2010: Triglia Rafinas

Senior career*
Years	Team	Apps	(Gls)
2010–2012	Kalamata	19	(0)
2012–2014	PAS Giannina	8	(0)
2014–2016	Panetolikos	8	(0)
2015	→ Panegialios (loan)	16	(0)
2016	Apollon Smyrnis	0	(0)
2017–2019	Kukësi	65	(1)
2020–2021	UTA Arad	34	(0)
2021–2022	Chindia Târgoviște	19	(0)
2023	Ionikos	5	(0)
2023	Eendracht Aalst	13	(0)
- * Club domestic league appearances and goals

Simo Rrumbullaku (born 30 December 1991) is an Albanian former professional footballer who played as a left-back.

== Club career ==
Rrumbullaku started his senior club career at Kalamata F.C., playing in Football League 2. In 2012, he moved to PAS Giannina who play in Superleague Greece. Since 2014 Roumpoulakos has played for Panaitolikos, although he had a loan spell at Panegialios in 2015.

=== Kukësi ===
On 23 December 2016, Rrumbullaku returned in Albania and joined top flight side Kukësi on an 18-month contract, taking squad number 20. He made his first Kukësi appearance on 27 January in team's first match of 2017 by starting in the 1–0 win at Vllaznia Shkodër. During the second part of 2016–17 season, Rrumbullaku played 10 league matches, all of them as starter, collecting 878 minutes. He concluded the season by winning the championship, which was his first career silverware and Kukësi's first ever championship.

He scored his first career goal on 16 November 2017 with a long-range shot in the 2–2 away draw against Kamza in the 2017–18 Albanian Superliga matchday 10. He dedicated the goal to his father.

== International career ==
Internationally, Roumpoulakos was eligible to play for Greece and Albania.

== Honours ==
Kalamata

- Delta Ethniki: 2010–11

Kukësi

- Albanian Superliga: 2016–17
- Albanian Cup: 2018–19

UTA Arad

- Liga II: 2019–20
