= Ștefan Dobre =

Romanian footballer (born 2001)

Personal information
- Full name: Ștefan Emilian Dobre
- Date of birth: 7 June 2001 (age 25)
- Place of birth: Timisoara, Romania
- Height: 1.94 m (6 ft 4 in)
- Position: Goalkeeper

Youth career
- 2008–2011: FC Interstar Sibiu
- 2011–2015: LPS Banatul Timișoara
- 2015–2018: Centrul de Excelență Timișoara

Senior career*
Years	Team	Apps	(Gls)
2018–2022	Ripensia Timișoara	57	(0)
2021	→ Academica Clinceni (loan)	5	(0)

International career
2018	Romania U18	1	(0)
- * Club domestic league appearances and goals as of 13:32, 12 December 2022 (UTC)

Ștefan Dobre (born 7 June 2001) is a Romanian professional footballer who plays as a goalkeeper.

== Club career ==
=== Academica Clinceni ===
He made his league debut on 19 September 2021 in Liga I match against FC Arges Pitesti.
