= David Morar =

Romanian footballer

Personal information
- Full name: David Cristian Morar
- Date of birth: 27 July 2004 (age 22)
- Place of birth: Cluj-Napoca, Romania
- Height: 1.86 m (6 ft 1 in)
- Position: Striker

Team information
- Current team: FCSB

Senior career*
Years	Team	Apps	(Gls)
2020–2021	Academica Clinceni	7	(0)
2021–	FCSB	0	(0)

International career^{‡}
2021–	Romania U17	1	(0)
- * Club domestic league appearances and goals as of 14 April 2021 ‡ National team caps and goals as of 14 April 2021

David Cristian Morar (born 27 July 2004) is a Romanian professional footballer who plays as a striker for Liga I side Academica Clinceni.

== Career statistics ==
=== Club ===
Club	Season	League		Cup		Europe		Other		Total	
Club	Season	Apps	Goals	Apps	Goals	Apps	Goals	Apps	Goals	Apps	Goals
Academica Clinceni	2020–21	7	0	0	0	–		–		7	0
Career Total		7	0	0	0	0	0	0	0	7	0
