= George Micle =

Romanian footballer

Personal information
- Full name: George Mihai Micle
- Date of birth: 8 November 2001 (age 25)
- Place of birth: Satu Mare, Romania
- Height: 1.92 m (6 ft 4 in)
- Position: Goalkeeper

Team information
- Current team: SCM Râmnicu Vâlcea
- Number: 44

Youth career
- 2008–2015: LPS Satu Mare
- 2015–2016: Centrul de Excelență Deva
- 2017–2019: FCSB

Senior career*
Years	Team	Apps	(Gls)
2019–2020	FCSB	0	(0)
2019–2020	→ Sportul Snagov (loan)	13	(0)
2020–2024	Argeș Pitești	18	(0)
2021	→ Universitatea Cluj (loan)	4	(0)
2024–2025	Metalul Buzău	10	(0)
2025–	SCM Râmnicu Vâlcea	23	(0)
- * Club domestic league appearances and goals as of 1 May 2026

George Mihai Micle (born 8 November 2001) is a Romanian professional footballer who plays as a goalkeeper for Liga III club SCM Râmnicu Vâlcea.
