= Marius Ciobanu =

Romanian professional footballer

Personal information
- Full name: Marius Florian Ciobanu-Vanghele
- Date of birth: 31 March 2003 (age 23)
- Place of birth: Bucharest, Romania
- Height: 1.81 m (5 ft 11 in)
- Position: Midfielder

Youth career
- 2013–2017: FCSB
- 2017–2020: Academica Clinceni

Senior career*
| Years | Team | Apps | (Gls) |
| 2020–2021 | Academica Clinceni | 4 | (0) |
| 2021 | → Unirea Slobozia (loan) | 13 | (1) |
| 2021–2022 | Universitatea Cluj | 19 | (0) |
| 2022–2023 | Unirea Slobozia | 7 | (0) |
| 2023 | FC U Craiova | 0 | (0) |
| 2023 | Alexandria | 3 | (0) |
| 2024–2025 | Unirea Dej | | |

International career
| 2021 | Romania U18 | 2 | (0) |
| 2021 | Romania U19 | 4 | (0) |
- * Club domestic league appearances and goals

Marius Florian Ciobanu-Vanghele (born 31 March 2003) is a Romanian former professional footballer who played as a midfielder.
