= Aleksa Marković (Austrian footballer) =

Austrian footballer

Aleksa Markovic
Personal information
- Date of birth: 13 April 2001 (age 25)
- Place of birth: Vienna, Austria
- Height: 1.82 m (5 ft 11 1/2 in)
- Position: Midfielder

Team information
- Current team: SC Neusiedl See
- Number: 22

Youth career
- KSV Siemens Großfeld
- 2012–2019: Floridsdorfer AC
- 2019–2020: Rot-Weiß Oberhausen

Senior career*
Years	Team	Apps	(Gls)
2018	Floridsdorfer AC II	1	(0)
2020–2021	Sepsi OSK	2	(0)
2021	NK Dekani	5	(0)
2022	SV Stripfing	4	(0)
2023	NK Dekani	16	(1)
2024–	SC Neusiedl See	11	(1)
- * Club domestic league appearances and goals as of 28 December 2024

Aleksa Markovic (born 13 April 2001) is an Austrian footballer who plays as a midfielder for SC Neusiedl See.

== Career ==
In September 2020, Markovic joined Romanian club Sepsi OSK on a one-year contract.

In February 2022, he joined German Regionalliga club SV Stripfing.
