= George Dragomir =

Romanian footballer

Personal information
- Full name: George Ionuț Dragomir
- Date of birth: 6 August 2003 (age 23)
- Place of birth: Făurei, Romania
- Height: 1.78 m (5 ft 10 in)
- Position: Winger

Team information
- Current team: CSM Focșani
- Number: 8

Youth career
- –2020: Făurei

Senior career*
Years	Team	Apps	(Gls)
2020–2023	Sepsi OSK	9	(1)
2023–2024	Botoșani	9	(0)
2024–	CSM Focșani	12	(0)
- * Club domestic league appearances and goals as of 10 May 2025

George Ionuț Dragomir (born 6 August 2003) is a Romanian professional footballer who plays as a midfielder for Liga II club CSM Focșani.

== Honours ==
Sepsi OSK

- Cupa României: 2021–22
- Supercupa României: 2022
