= Ionuț Rus =

Romanian footballer

Personal information
- Full name: Ionuț Casian Rus
- Date of birth: 20 January 2000 (age 26)
- Place of birth: Timișoara, Romania
- Height: 1.98 m (6 ft 6 in)
- Position: Goalkeeper

Team information
- Current team: Politehnica Timișoara
- Number: 23

Youth career
- –2016: LPS Banatul Timișoara
- 2016–2019: Lazio

Senior career*
Years	Team	Apps	(Gls)
2019–2023	CFR Cluj	0	(0)
2019	→ Luceafărul Oradea (loan)	6	(0)
2019	→ Turris Turnu Măgurele (loan)	11	(0)
2021	→ Hermannstadt (loan)	0	(0)
2021–2022	→ Ripensia Timișoara (loan)	20	(0)
2023	→ Ripensia Timișoara (loan)	8	(0)
2023–2024	CSM Reșița	15	(0)
2024–2026	Bihor Oradea	15	(0)
2026	CSM Reșița	1	(0)
2026–	Politehnica Timișoara	0	(0)

International career
2016	Romania U16	2	(0)
2017	Romania U18	1	(0)
2018	Romania U19	1	(0)
- * Club domestic league appearances and goals as of 25 April 2026

Ionuț Casian Rus (born 20 January 2000) is a Romanian professional footballer who plays as a goalkeeper for Liga II club Politehnica Timișoara.

== Club career ==
Ionuț Rus started his career at LPS Banatul Timișoara, the club of the Sports High School from his hometown. On 30 January 2016 he signed a 3-year contract with Italian side S.S. Lazio. In the three years spent in Rome the young goalkeeper from Timișoara played 24 matches.

=== CFR Cluj ===
On 6 January 2019 Rus signed his first professional contract with the defending champion of Romania, CFR Cluj. He will be under contract with "the railwaymen" until January 2024.

=== Luceafărul Oradea ===
On 13 February 2019 CFR Cluj decided to give him the chance to play constantly, loaning him to the second league side CS Luceafărul Oradea. This decision was made due to the tough competition that was on this position in CFR's squad, where the first two choices as a goalkeeper were Giedrius Arlauskis and Jesús Fernández.

=== Turris Turnu Măgurele ===
On 9 July 2019 Rus was loaned by CFR Cluj to Turris-Oltul Turnu Măgurele.

== International career ==
Ionuț Rus played for Romania U16 and Romania U18 football teams, now being eligible for Romania U19 team, for which he made his debut on 17 November 2018, in a 3-5 defeat against Greece.
