= AFC Odorheiu Secuiesc =

Romanian football club

Odorheiu Secuiesc
- Full name: Asociația Fotbal Club; Odorheiu Secuiesc
- Nicknames: Odorheienii (The People from Odorhei); Secuii (The Székelys)
- Short name: Odorhei, SZFC
- Founded: 1922; 104 years ago as Textila Odorheiu Secuiesc; 2006; 20 years ago as AFC Odorheiu Secuiesc
- Ground: Municipal
- Capacity: 5,000
- Owner: Odorheiu Secuiesc Municipality
- Chairman: Attila Berkeczi
- Manager: Norbert Demény
- League: Liga III
- 2025–26: Liga III, Seria I, 6th
- Website: https://szfc.ro/
Home colours	Away colours	Third colours

Asociația Fotbal Club Odorheiu Secuiesc, commonly known as AFC Odorheiu Secuiesc (Hungarian: Székelyudvarhely FC) or simply Odorheiu Secuiesc, is a professional Romanian football club based in Odorheiu Secuiesc, Harghita County and also geographically placed in the historic and ethnographic region of Székely Land, an area inhabited mainly by Székelys, a subgroup of the Hungarian people.

The team was founded in 1922 as Textila Odorheiu Secuiesc and played for most of its existence in the third tier of the Romanian football league system. The only period in Liga II was spent during the 1973–74 season when the club was ranked 17th of 18 and was relegated back to Liga III. In 2004 the club was relegated to Liga IV and after some struggles, it was declared bankrupt and dissolved. On 12 December 2006, the new entity, AFC Odorheiu Secuiesc, was founded in order to try to ensure the continuity of the football tradition in Odorheiu Secuiesc. The club was recognized and accepted unanimously by supporters thus becoming the official successor of the old entity, Textila Odorheiu Secuiesc.

== History ==
=== The original club (1922–2006) ===
History of the professional football started in Odorheiu Secuiesc in 1922, when it was founded the first team of the city, Textila. For nearly fifteen years, the club competed in the district and regional championships without achieving any notable results, but that was about to change in the summer of 1968 when, after a strong campaign, Lemnarul Odorheiu Secuiesc earned its first-ever promotion to Divizia C by winning Series II of the Mureș Regional Championship

In their debut season in the third division, Lemnarul finished 4th out of 16 in Series VIII. The following year saw a 5th-place finish in the same series, followed by another 4th-place finish in Series VIII during the 1970–71 season. Renamed Textila, the club maintained its competitive form, finishing 4th once again in Series XII in the 1971–72 season, and then securing 2nd place in Series XI at the end of the 1972–73 campaign, just behind Gaz Metan Mediaș, thus earning promotion to Divizia B for the first time in its history. This beautiful dream lasted only one season, as Textila proved unprepared for the challenges of this level, finishing 17th out of 18 teams under the leadership of Tiberiu Bone.

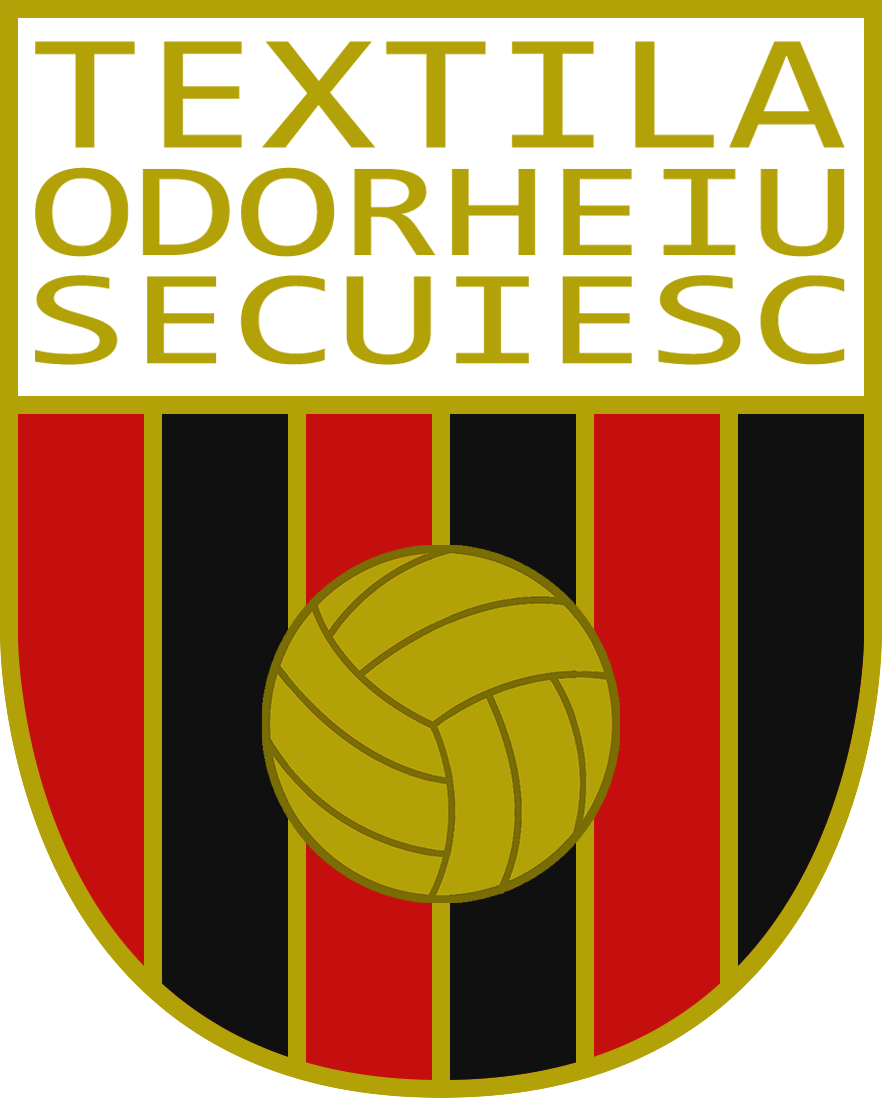
Old logo as Textila Odorheiu Secuiesc

In the summer of 1974, after the relegation from Divizia B, the leadership of the club decided to bring some fresh air inside the team and one of the measures was to change its name, from Textila Odorheiu Secuiesc to Progresul Odorheiu Secuiesc. After being ranked 8th at the end of the 1974–75 season, followed another second place in 1976, but this time was not a promoting place, the neighbors from Oltul Sfântu Gheorghe being the team which was going up. After four seasons in which at its best the team was ranked 3rd, Progresul finished again second, two times in a row, at the end of the 1980–81 and 1981–82 seasons, first time behind ICIM Brașov, then right after Precizia Săcele. In these conditions when the team seemed to force the promotion to the second tier again, relegated unexpectedly in 1983, after finishing 15th of 16. Interestingly, it's the same year in which the other team from Harghita County, Tractorul Miercurea Ciuc also relegated. Progresul promoted back after only one year of absence and for the next seven years imposed itself as a strong opponent, being ranked generally in top five of its series, two times even finishing in second place (1987–88 and 1988–89).

Name	Period
Textila Odorheiu Secuiesc	1922–1960
Lemnarul Odorheiu Secuiesc	1960–1971
Textila Odorheiu Secuiesc	1971–1974
Progresul Odorheiu Secuiesc	1974–1991
Harghita Odorheiu Secuiesc	1991–1998
Budvar Odorheiu Secuiesc	1998–2006
AFC Odorheiu Secuiesc	2006–present

In the summer of 1991, the club changed its name again, this time from Progresul Odorheiu Secuiesc to Harghita Odorheiu Secuiesc. Odorheienii continued their Divizia C spell but at its best, the team was ranked third. After two weak seasons, 1996–97 – 15th and 1997–98 – 18th, the team has gone through some administrative changes and in the summer of 1998 changed its name from Harghita Odorheiu Secuiesc to Budvar Odorheiu Secuiesc. In six years as "Budvar" the team finished only one time in top 10 (2000–01 – 5th), the mediocre results culminating in a relegation to Divizia D at the end of the 2003–04 season, after exactly 20 years spent in the third tier. During the next two years the football from the city struggled to survive, in 2006, the team of SC Roseal SA company, CS Roseal Odorheiu Secuiesc promoted to Liga III, but can't survive at this level and after only one season relegated back.

=== Refoundation and recent years (2006–present) ===
On 12 December 2006, at the initiative of some local football managers and supporters, a new entity, named AFC Odorheiu Secuiesc, was founded to be the successor of the old club, known over time as Textila, Progresul, Harghita or Budvar. The founding members of the football club, in its current form, were: Csaba Albert, Lajos Balázs, Attila Berkeczi, Csaba Dénes and Domokos Jankó.

Odorheienii promoted to Liga III at the end of 2008–09 season, but after only three seasons relegated back to Liga IV, in the last one, 2011–12, being even excluded from the league until the winter break due to financial problems. After another three seasons spent in the county league, the Székelys promoted to the third tier in 2015 after winning its county league and the promotion playoff match against Nemere Ghelința, Covasna County champions, 7–1 on aggregate.

After promotion the black and orange team obtained the following rankings: 12th (2015–16), 12th (2016–17) and 11th (2017–18).

== Grounds ==
AFC Odorheiu Secuiesc plays its home matches on Municipal Stadium in Odorheiu Secuiesc, with a capacity of 5,000 seats.

== Honours ==
Liga III

- Winners (2): 2021–22, 2024–25
- Runners-up (6): 1972–73, 1975–76, 1980–81, 1981–82, 1987–88, 1988–89

Liga IV – Harghita County

- Winners (2): 1983–84, 2014–15
- Runners-up (1): 2013–14

Regional Championship

- Winners (1): 1967–68

== Players ==
=== First team squad ===
As of 10 September 2024

Note: Flags indicate national team as defined under FIFA eligibility rules; some limited exceptions apply. Players may hold more than one non-FIFA nationality.

No.	Pos.	Nation	Player
1	GK	ROU	Dániel Lukács (on loan from Csíkszereda)
3	DF	ROU	Attila Berkeczi
4	DF	ROU	Szabolcs Kovács
5	DF	ROU	Flavius Colceriu (on loan from Csíkszereda)
6	MF	ROU	Krisztián Marosi
7	MF	ROU	Arthur Györgyi
8	DF	ROU	Kristóf Lázár
9	FW	ROU	Robert Ronai (on loan from Csíkszereda)
10	FW	ROU	Raul Gavîrliță
11	MF	ROU	János Botorok
12	GK	ROU	Jakab Zalán

No.	Pos.	Nation	Player
13	MF	ROU	Alex Göndör (on loan from Csíkszereda)
14	FW	ROU	Botond Opra
15	DF	ROU	Botond Gergely
16	DF	ROU	Lénárd Szőke
17	MF	ROU	Botond Sebestyén
19	DF	ROU	Tamás Hadnagy
20	MF	ROU	Levente Bara (Captain)
21	MF	ROU	Rajmond Bálint
22	FW	ROU	Tamás Biró (on loan from Csíkszereda)
26	DF	ROU	Csongor Simó (on loan from Csíkszereda)
33	DF	ROU	Tamás Tordai

=== Out on loan ===
Note: Flags indicate national team as defined under FIFA eligibility rules; some limited exceptions apply. Players may hold more than one non-FIFA nationality.

No. / Pos. / Nation / Player	No. / Pos. / Nation / Player

== Club officials ==
=== Board of directors ===
Role	Name
Owner	(Romania) Odorheiu Secuiesc Municipality
President	(Romania) Attila Berkeczi
Sporting director	(Romania) Zsolt László
Head of Youth Center	(Romania) János Botorok
Secretary	(Romania) Hunor Toró

=== Current technical staff ===
Role	Name
Manager	(Romania) Norbert Demény
Assistant coach	(Romania) Ferenc Szin
Goalkeeping coach	(Romania) Carol Fekete
Masseur	(Romania) Attila Fodor

== League history ==
Season	Tier	Division	Place	Notes	Cupa României
2025–26	3	Liga III (Seria I)	TBD		
2024–25	3	Liga III (Seria VI)	1st (C)		
2023–24	3	Liga III (Seria V)	5th		
2022–23	3	Liga III (Seria V)	5th		
2021–22	3	Liga III (Seria V)	1st (C)		Fourth Round
2020–21	3	Liga III (Seria V)	9th		Third Round
2019–20	3	Liga III (Seria V)	15th		Second Round
2018–19	3	Liga III (Seria V)	10th		First Round
2017–18	3	Liga III (Seria I)	11th		First Round

Season	Tier	Division	Place	Notes	Cupa României
2016–17	3	Liga III (Seria I)	12th		First Round
2015–16	3	Liga III (Seria V)	12th		
2014–15	4	Liga IV (HR)	1st (C)	Promoted	
2013–14	4	Liga IV (HR)	2nd		
2012–13	Not active				
2011–12	3	Liga III (Seria I)	16th	Withdrew	
2010–11	3	Liga III (Seria VI)	15th		
2009–10	3	Liga III (Seria VI)	7th		
2008–09	4	Liga IV (HR)	1st (C)	Promoted	

== Former managers ==
- (Romania) Tiberiu Bone (1973–1974)
