= Denis Rusu (footballer, born 2001) =

Romanian professional footballer

Personal information
- Full name: Denis Alex Rusu
- Date of birth: 21 March 2001 (age 25)
- Place of birth: Avram Iancu, Romania
- Height: 1.70 m (5 ft 7 in)
- Position: Attacking midfielder

Team information
- Current team: Crișul Sântandrei
- Number: 11

Youth career
- Victoria Avram Iancu
- LPS Bihorul Oradea
- 2018: Botoșani

Senior career*
Years	Team	Apps	(Gls)
2018–2021	Șoimii Lipova	53	(14)
2020–2021	→ UTA Arad (loan)	35	(2)
2021–2025	CFR Cluj	0	(0)
2021	CFR II Cluj	1	(0)
2022	→ Chindia Târgoviște (loan)	1	(0)
2022	→ Unirea Ungheni (loan)	14	(0)
2023	→ Șoimii Lipova (loan)	7	(0)
2025–	Crișul Sântandrei	17	(8)
- * Club domestic league appearances and goals as of 13:13, 13 January 2026 (UTC)

Denis Alex Rusu (born 21 March 2001) is a Romanian professional footballer who plays as an attacking midfielder for Crișul Sântandrei.
