= Marius Cioiu =

Romanian professional footballer

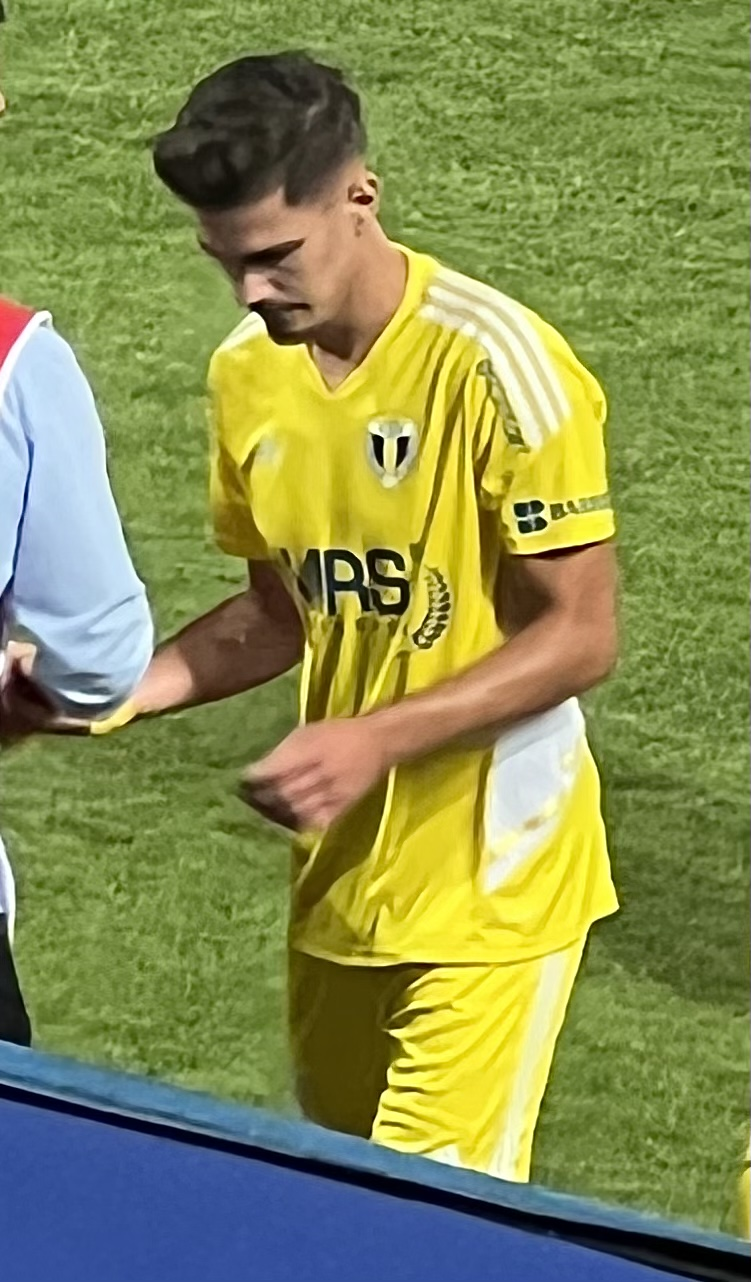
- Cioiu with Petrolul Ploiești in 2022

Personal information
- Full name: Marius Iulian Cioiu
- Date of birth: 1 November 1999 (age 27)
- Place of birth: Târgu Jiu, Romania
- Height: 1.80 m (5 ft 11 in)
- Position: Right midfielder

Team information
- Current team: ASA Târgu Mureș
- Number: 24

Youth career
- –2017: Pandurii Targu Jiu
- 2017–2018: Luceafărul Oradea

Senior career*
Years	Team	Apps	(Gls)
2017–2018	Luceafărul Oradea		
2018–2021	Viitorul Târgu Jiu	64	(7)
2021–2022	Academica Clinceni	16	(1)
2022–2023	Petrolul Ploiești	20	(1)
2023–2024	Botoșani	30	(0)
2024–2026	CSM Reșița	54	(6)
2026–	ASA Târgu Mureș	12	(0)
- * Club domestic league appearances and goals as of 31 October 2026

Marius Iulian Cioiu (born 1 November 1999) is a Romanian professional footballer who plays as a right midfielder for Liga II club ASA Târgu Mureș.

== Club career ==
=== Academica Clinceni ===
He made his league debut on 16 July 2021 in Liga I match against Sepsi OSK. Marius Iulian Cioiu continued to play for Academica Clinceni for the 2021-2022 season for the first round of matches.

=== FC Petrolul Ploiești ===
From February 2022, Marius Cioiu was moved to Liga II team FC Petrolul Ploiești. The Romanian Midfielder had 8 appearances during the season for FC Petrolul, a team which eventually finished in the first league position and qualified for the Liga I season of 2022-2023.

During the 2022-2023 season of Romanian Liga I, Marius Cioiu recorded a number of 10 appearances playing for FC Petrolul Ploiești, 8 of which was drawn in the first eleven and two substitutes in.

== Honours ==
ACS Șirineasa

- Liga III: 2017–18

Petrolul Ploiești

- Liga II: 2021–22
