= Vlad Mitrea =

Romanian footballer

Personal information
- Full name: Vlad Nicolae Mitrea
- Date of birth: 23 January 2001 (age 25)
- Place of birth: Bucharest, Romania
- Height: 1.82 m (6 ft 0 in)
- Position: Midfielder

Team information
- Current team: Unirea Dej
- Number: 11

Youth career
- –2016: Dinamo București
- 2017–2019: Inter Milan
- 2019–2020: Lokeren

Senior career*
Years	Team	Apps	(Gls)
2020–2022	Sepsi OSK	6	(0)
2021	→ Petrolul Ploiești (loan)	4	(0)
2022–2023	Mioveni	2	(0)
2023	Unirea Constanța	9	(0)
2023–	Unirea Dej	4	(0)

International career
2017–2018	Romania U16	1	(0)
2017–2018	Romania U17	3	(1)
2018	Romania U18	3	(0)
- * Club domestic league appearances and goals as of 28 October 2023

Vlad Nicolae Mitrea (born 23 January 2001) is a Romanian professional footballer who plays as a midfielder for Liga II club Unirea Dej.

== Career ==
Mitrea spent his junior years at Dinamo București and Internazionale. At age 18, he joined the senior team of Belgian First Division B side Lokeren, but the club went bankrupt during his first season there and he did not manage to make an appearance.
