= Emanuel Dat =

Romanian footballer

Personal information
- Full name: Emanuel Andrei Dat
- Date of birth: 18 January 2001 (age 25)
- Place of birth: Oradea, Romania
- Height: 1.71 m (5 ft 7 in)
- Position: Left winger

Team information
- Current team: CSU Alba Iulia
- Number: 7

Youth career
- –2016: LPS Bihorul Oradea
- 2016–2017: Dunărea Călărași
- 2017–2019: CFR Cluj

Senior career*
Years	Team	Apps	(Gls)
2016	Dunărea Călărași	2	(0)
2019–2021	CFR Cluj	0	(0)
2019–2021	→ CSM Reșița (loan)	48	(3)
2021–2023	Mioveni	6	(0)
2023	Sighetu Marmației	14	(4)
2024	Gloria Bistrița	10	(0)
2024–	CSU Alba Iulia	15	(2)
- * Club domestic league appearances and goals as of 18:01, 23 December 2024 (UTC)

Emanuel Andrei Dat (born 18 January 2001) is a Romanian professional footballer who plays as a left winger for CSU Alba Iulia.
