= Colonești, Olt =

Colonești
- Commune
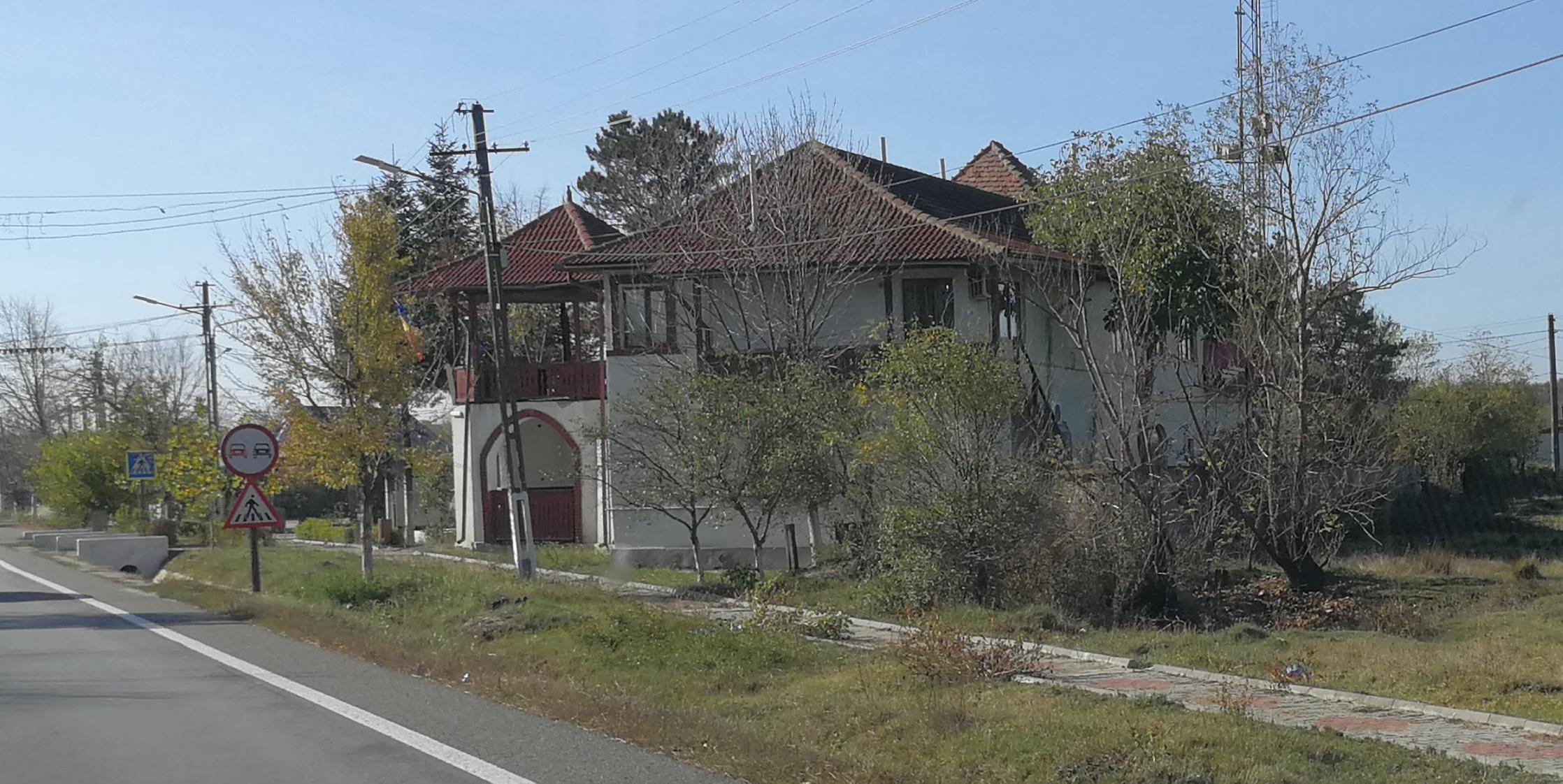
- Colonești town hall

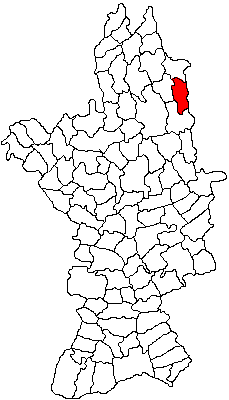
- Location in Olt County

- Location in Romania
- Coordinates: 44.629°N 24.673°E
- Country: Romania
- County: Olt

Government
  - Mayor (2020–2024): Nicolae Stan (PSD)
- Area: 50.15 km^{2} (19.36 sq mi)
- Elevation: 221 m (725 ft)
- Population (2021-12-01): 1,688
  - Density: 33.66/km^{2} (87.18/sq mi)
- Time zone: UTC+02:00 (EET)
  - Summer (DST): UTC+03:00 (EEST)
- Postal code: 237080
- Area code: (+40) 02 49
- Vehicle reg.: OT
- Website: www.primariacolonesti.ro

Colonești is a commune in Olt County, Muntenia, Romania. It is composed of nine villages: Bărăști, Bătăreni, Cârstani, Chelbești, Colonești, Guești, Mărunței, Năvârgeni, and Vlaici.

CS Vedița Colonești was a professional football club based in Colonești; it was founded in 1982 and dissolved in 2025.

Historical population
Year	Pop.	±%
2002	2,222	—
2011	2,072	−6.8%
2021	1,688	−18.5%
Source: Census data

== Natives ==
- Alexandru Șerbănescu (1912–1944), fighter pilot and flying ace in World War II.
