= CS Vedița Colonești =

Romanian football club

Vedița Colonești
- Full name: Club Sportiv Vedița; Colonești M.S.
- Nicknames: Alb-Albaștrii (The White and Blues)
- Short name: Vedița
- Founded: 1982
- Dissolved: 2025
- Ground: Mircea Stan
- Capacity: 500 (200 seated)
- 2024–25: Liga III, Seria IV, 2nd
Home colours	Away colours

Club Sportiv Vedița Colonești M.S., commonly known as Vedița Colonești or simply as Vedița, was a Romanian professional football club based in Colonești, Olt County.

== History ==
Vedița Colonești was originally founded in 1982 and play all its existence at amateur level.

=== Atletic Bradu (2008–2019) ===
Atletic Bradu was founded in 2008 and was based in Bradu, Argeș County, having a kit color combination of white and green. Atletic played in the Liga IV–Argeș County until 2010 when the club won the league and promoted to Liga III. The best performance was 2nd place at the end of the 2016–17 Liga III season.

During the 2018–19 winter break, following some misunderstandings with local authorities of Bradu, Atletic moved from Argeș County to Colonești, Olt County. In Colonești, the owner of the team reached an agreement with the local authorities, so that in the summer of 2019 Atletic will merge with the local team, Vedița Colonești, changing its name and colors.

=== Vedița Colonești (2019–2025) ===
In the summer of 2019, it was announced officially that Atletic Bradu merged with Vedița Colonești. After this move, Vedița Colonești took Atletic Bradu place in the Liga III, then absorbed the team based in Argeș County.

== Honours ==
=== Leagues ===
- Liga III
  - Winners (1): 2020–21
  - Runners-up (2): 2016–17, 2023–24
- Liga IV – Argeș County
  - Winners (2): 2009–10, 2012–13

== League history ==
Season	Tier	Division	Place	Cupa României
2024–25	3	Liga III (Seria IV)	2nd (R)	
2023–24	3	Liga III (Seria VI)	2nd	
2022–23	3	Liga III (Seria VI)	9th	
2021–22	3	Liga III (Seria VI)	4th	
2020–21	3	Liga III (Seria VI)	1st (C)	
2019–20	3	Liga III (Seria III)	6th	
2018–19	3	Liga III (Seria III)	13th	
2017–18	3	Liga III (Seria III)	8th	

Season	Tier	Division	Place	Cupa României
2016–17	3	Liga III (Seria III)	2nd	
2015–16	3	Liga III (Seria III)	8th	
2014–15	3	Liga III (Seria III)	7th	
2013–14	3	Liga III (Seria VI)	4th	
2012–13	4	Liga IV (AG)	1st (C, P)	
2011–12	3	Liga III (Seria IV)	15th (R)	
2010–11	3	Liga III (Seria III)	9th	
2009–10	4	Liga IV (AG)	1st (C, P)	

== Former managers ==
- (Romania) Adrian Neaga (2013–2014)
- (Romania) Cornel Frăsineanu (2014–2015)
- (Romania) Adrian Neaga (2016)
- (Romania) Constantin Schumacher (2019)
