= Gabriel Manu =

Romanian footballer and manager

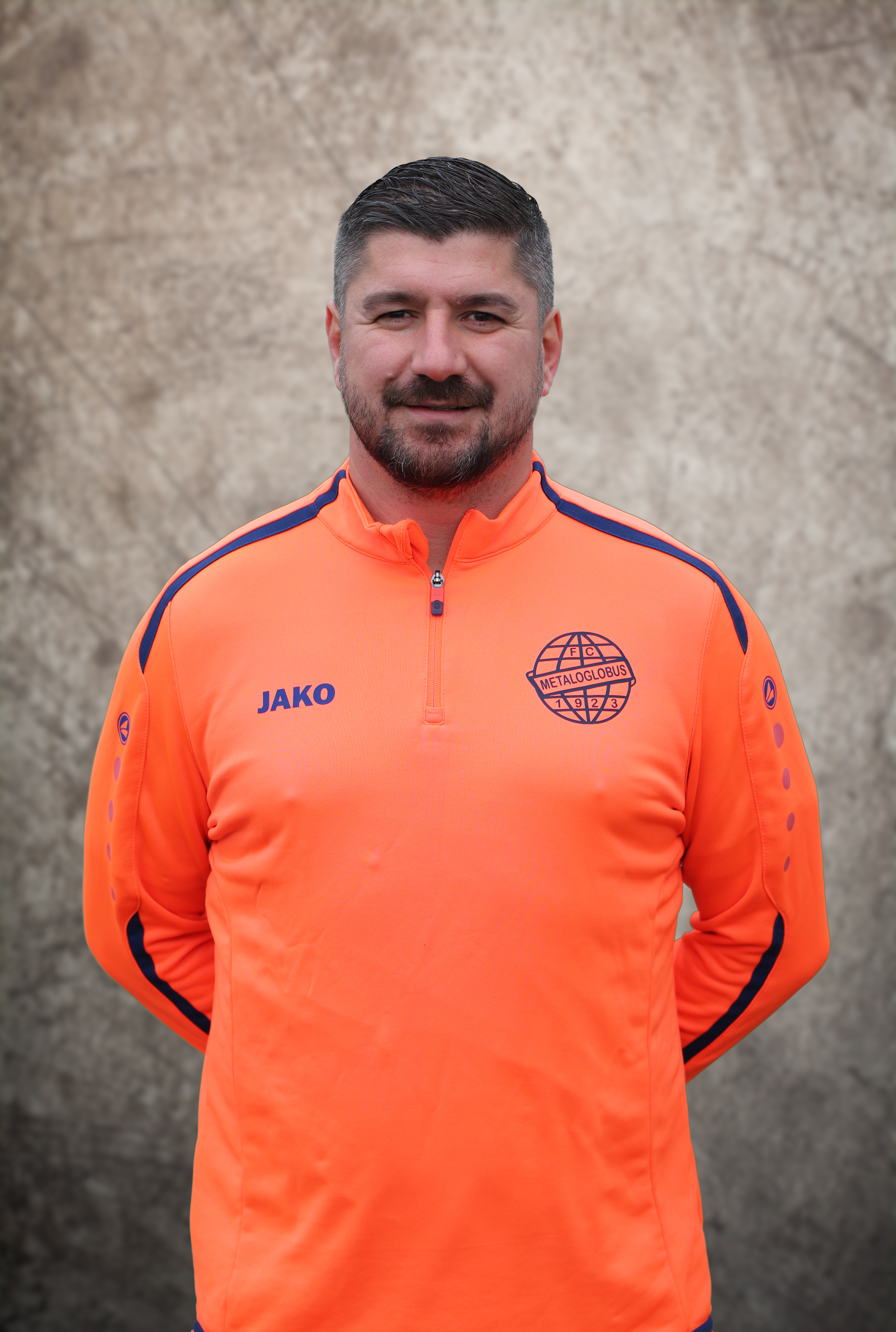

Personal information
- Full name: Gabriel Nicolae Manu
- Date of birth: 5 December 1981 (age 44)
- Place of birth: Bucharest, Romania
- Position: Striker

Team information
- Current team: free of contract (manager)

Youth career
- 1990–1998: Sportul Studențesc
- 1998–1999: Steaua București

Senior career*
| Years | Team | Apps | (Gls) |
| 1999–2001 | Rocar București | | |

Managerial career
- 2003–2007: Dinamo București (youth)
- 2007: Dunărea Galați (assistant)
- 2007–2008: CS Otopeni (assistant)
- 2008–2010: Sportul Studențesc (assistant)
- 2010–2011: Astra Ploiești (assistant)
- 2011: FCM Târgu Mureș (assistant)
- 2013: Săgeata Năvodari (assistant)
- 2015–2017: Romania (technical coach)
- 2017–2018: Al Wahda (assistant)
- 2018–2020: Al-Wasl (assistant)
- 2020–2021: Metaloglobus București (manager)
- 2023: CS Tunari (manager)
- * Club domestic league appearances and goals

Gabi Manu (Gabriel Nicolae Manu, born 5 December 1981, Bucharest) is a Romanian football manager and former professional player. He was active in clubs in Liga I and Liga II, as well as in the United Arab Emirates.

== Early life ==
He comes from a family with a strong sporting tradition. He is the son of Ion Manu, former goalkeeper of Rapid București, a legendary goalkeeper for the Rapid București club between 1977 and 1990, and later a goalkeeping coach with a record of eight trophies won. His grandfather is Nae Georgescu, former captain of the Romania national football team and the Rapid club.

His mother was also an elite athlete, finishing as a national runner-up in basketball with the Rapid București team.

Gabi accompanied his father when the latter coached in Arab countries (Al-Jazira), where he directly observed the working methods of top managers like Ilie Balaci and Cosmin Olăroiu. Manu has described Ilie Balaci as a "second father" and a mentor who provided him with numerous tactical and professional insights.

== Playing career ==
=== Early career and youth ===
Gabi Manu started playing football at age 9 at the Sportul Studențesc club in 1990. There, he won five national titles. He stayed with the club until 1998. In this period, he was selected for Romanian national youth teams, part of the UEFA '98 generation.

In 1998, he transferred to Steaua București, where he played for the youth team (U19) under the management of Ștefan Iovan.

=== Club career ===
His senior and youth career spanned:

- Sportul Studențesc (Youth): 1990–1998.
- Steaua București (U19/Youth): 1998–1999 season.
- Rocar București: He joined the team in July 1999, which was his final registered club before ending his playing career.

=== Style of play ===
He was a central striker.

=== Achievements ===
His playing career ended prematurely due to medical reasons, without winning major trophies at the senior level. Manu retrospectively described himself as a player who did not reach the high performance levels achieved by his father or grandfather.

=== Retirement ===
His active playing career officially ended on 1 July 2001, at the age of 19, at Rocar București.

His retirement was forced by a severe knee injury sustained during a winter training camp in Forban. Manu stepped away from playing to focus on his education and his future managerial career.

== Managerial career ==
=== Early career ===
Gabi Manu began his coaching career at age 22, immediately following his retirement as a player due to a knee injury.

He began managing at the children and youth academy of Dinamo București between 2003 and 2007, where he won the Bucharest Cup in June 2005.

He worked with children's groups (under-6 level), contributing to the initial development of players who later reached the national team level, including Ionuț Nedelcearu and Denis Ciubotariu.

=== Professional trajectory ===
He worked as assistant manager, technical coach, and manager at several clubs, as well as at the Romania national team:

In 2007, he left Dinamo to become Liviu Ciobotariu's assistant at Dunărea Galați; the team took 6th place. Subsequently, the two moved to CS Otopeni, where they achieved promotion to Liga I in the 2007–2008 season.

He worked as an assistant manager in Tibor Selymes' staff at Sportul Studențesc from 2008 to 2010 (promotion to Liga I), Astra Ploiești from 2010 to 2011, and Săgeata Năvodari in 2013.

Between 2015 and 2017, Manu served as a technical coach for Romania national football team during the term of Anghel Iordănescu (at Euro 2016) and Christoph Daum.

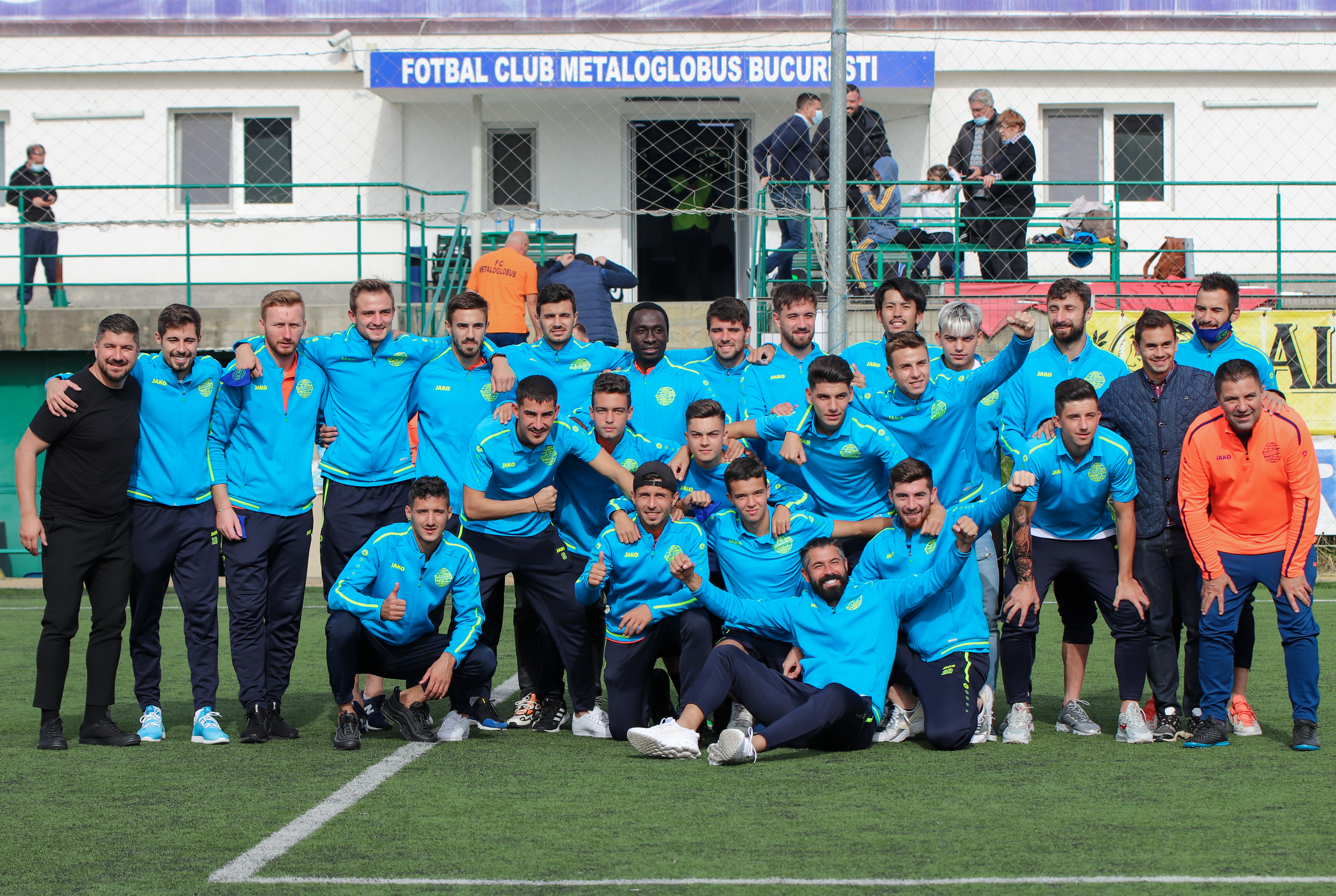
Gabi Manu la Metaloglobus

Between 2017 and 2020, he was an assistant manager in Laurențiu Reghecampf's staff at Al-Wahda and Al-Wasl, winning three international trophies during this period.

His first experience as a manager in Liga II was at Metaloglobus București (2020–2021). The team remained in the play-off spots for most of the season, but missed qualification in the final round following a decisive match against Rapid. This position was achieved in Liga II, which included clubs playing in Superliga, such as Rapid București, Petrolul Ploiești, U Cluj, and Farul Constanța.

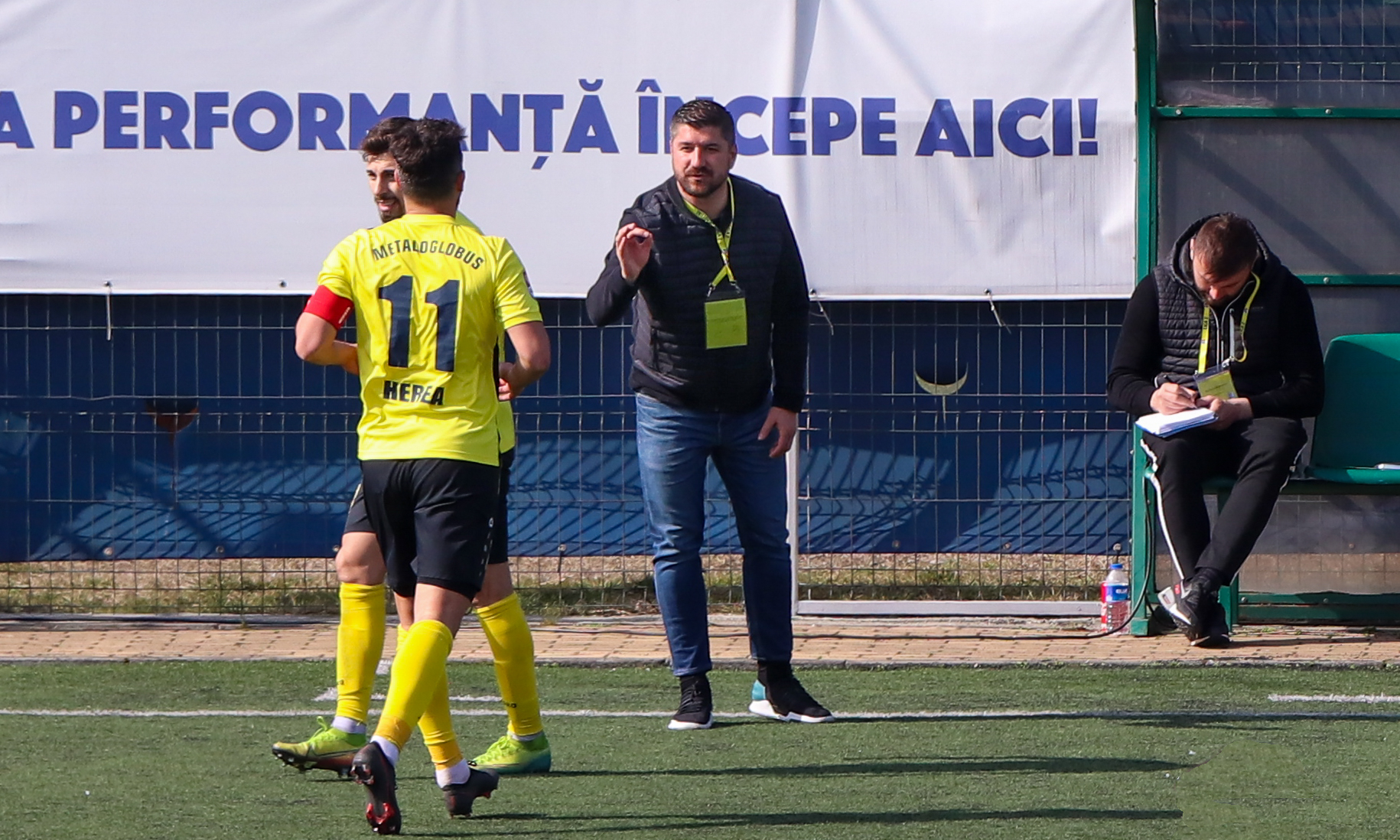
Gabi Manu si fratii Herea

In 2023, he took charge of CS Tunari in Liga III, leading the club to its first-ever promotion to Liga II. The team finished the season at the top of Series IV, 9 points ahead of CS Popești-Leordeni. In the promotion play-offs, Tunari eliminated Farul Constanța II (1–3 away and 4–0 at home), and then defeated CS Popești-Leordeni again (1–2 away, 3–1 at home).

=== Notable players coached/developed ===
- Alexandru Bourceanu, Ciprian Milea, Velescu, and Stoicescu (at Dunărea Galați).
- Junior Morais, Takayuki Seto, Adi Mihalcea, and Lucian Goian (at Astra Ploiești).
- Ovidiu Herea, Claudiu Herea, and Sota Mino (at Metaloglobus).

==== Managerial achievements and awards ====
He achieved two promotions to Liga I as an assistant manager (CS Otopeni and Sportul Studențesc) and one promotion to Liga II as a manager (CS Tunari, 2023).

He earned two UAE Super Cups and one Arabian Gulf Cup, all won with Al-Wahda as an assistant manager.

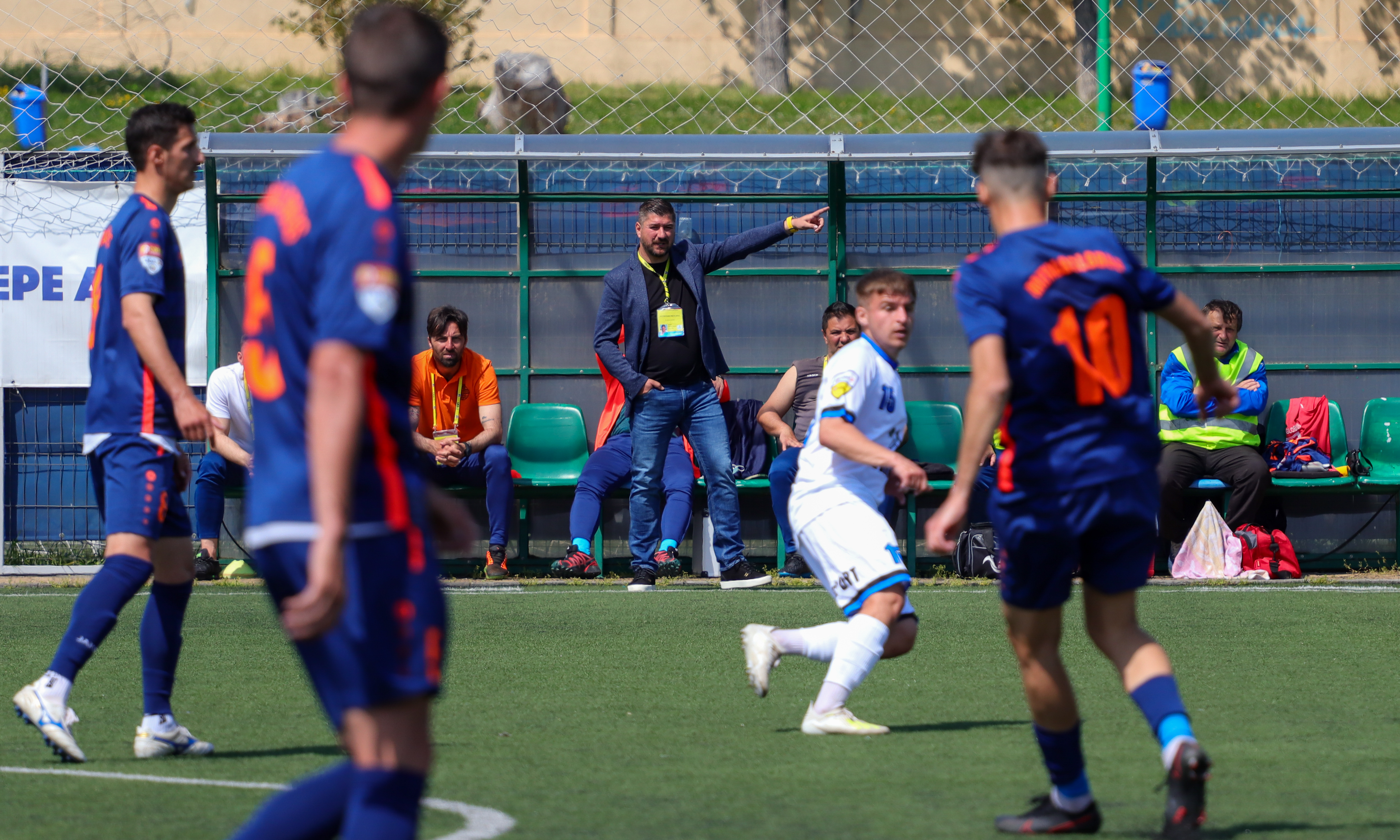
Gabi Manu coaching

=== Licenses, courses, and education ===
- In 2015 he obtained a UEFA Pro Licence from the Romanian Football Federation (FRF).
- He is the only Romanian manager to hold the "Premier Diploma" certification, issued by United Soccer Coaches in the United States.
- A graduate of the National Academy of Physical Education and Sport (ANEFS), he holds a Master's degree in Sports Management and is enrolled in doctoral studies at the University of Pitești, researching the use of multimedia tools in football training.
- He worked for two years at the FRF Federal Coaching School, holding administrative and instructor roles for other managers studying for their UEFA licenses.
- As of 2026 Gabi Manu is listed as an active holder of a pro license.

=== Managerial style ===
Gabi Manu is described as a manager with an offense, goal-oriented approach. His methods incorporate elements of mental coaching and personal development. He is known for his thorough tactical analysis of opponents and strong team organization.

== Statistics ==
=== Managerial ===
His coaching activity covers all professional levels, from youth academies to first-team management.

| Period | Club / Team | Role | Matches | Notable results |
|---|---|---|---|---|
| 2003 – 2007 | Dinamo București (Youth) | Youth coach | — | Player development |
| 2007 | Dunărea Galați | Assistant manager | — | - |
| 2007 – 2008 | CS Otopeni | Assistant manager | — | Promotion to Liga I |
| 2008 – 2010 | Sportul Studențesc | Assistant manager | — | Promotion to Liga I |
| 2010 – 2011 | Astra Ploiești | Assistant manager | — | 9th place in Liga I |
| 2011 | CSM Târgu Mureș | Assistant manager | — | |
| 2013 | Săgeata Năvodari | Assistant manager | — | |
| 2015 – 2017 | Romania National Team | Technical coach | — | Euro 2016 |
| 2017 – 2018 | Al-Wahda (UAE) | Assistant manager | — | 3 Trophies |
| 2018 – 2020 | Al-Wasl (UAE) | Assistant manager | — | - |
| 2020 – 2021 | Metaloglobus București | Manager | 27 | Missed Liga II play-offs |
| 2023 | CS Tunari | Manager | 4 | Promotion to Liga II |

== Palmares - Throphies ==
As an assistant manager:

- UAE Super Cup: 2 trophies with Al-Wahda (UAE) and Laurențiu Reghecampf.
- Arabian Gulf Cup: 1 trophy with Al-Wahda (UAE) and Laurențiu Reghecampf.
- Promotion to Liga I (Romania): With CS Otopeni, in the 2007–2008 season alongside Liviu Ciobotariu.
- Promotion to Liga I (Romania): With Sportul Studențesc alongside Tibor Selymes.

As a manager:

- Promotion to Liga II with CS Tunari (2022–2023). This was the first promotion to Liga II in the club's history.

As a player:

- His playing career ended prematurely due to medical reasons at the age of 19; therefore, his honours do not include major senior trophies.

== Personal life ==
Gabi Manu married Carmen Ioniță, a professional event organizer.
