= Herea (surname) =

Herea is a Romanian surname. Notable people with the surname include:

- Claudiu Herea (born 1990), Romanian footballer
- Florina Herea (born 1979), Romanian swimmer
- Ovidiu Herea (born 1985), Romanian footballer
