= 2020–21 Liga II =

Liga II
- Season: 2020–21
- Country: Romania
- Teams: 21
- Promoted: FCU 1948 Craiova; Rapid București; Mioveni
- Relegated: Comuna Recea; CSM Reșița; Slatina; Pandurii Targu Jiu; Aerostar Bacău; Turris Turnu Măgurele
- Matches: 263
- Goals: 655 (2.49 per match)
- Top goalscorer: Marius Coman (15 goals) (Comuna Recea)
- Biggest home win: Recea 6–0 Reșița
- Biggest away win: Călărași 1–5 Mioveni; Aerostar 1–5 Viitorul
- Highest scoring: Recea 3–4 Viitorul; Viitorul 4–3 Pandurii; Viitorul 4–3 Reșița; Recea 5–2 Slatina
- Longest winning run: 5 matches: Rapid București
- Longest unbeaten run: 15 matches: FCU 1948 Craiova
- Longest winless run: 14 matches: Aerostar Bacău
- Longest losing run: 6 matches: Aerostar Bacău
- Highest attendance: 0 (behind closed doors)
- Lowest attendance: 0 (behind closed doors)
- All statistics correct as of 6 June 2021.

The 2020–21 Liga II (also known as Liga II Casa Pariurilor for sponsorship reasons) was the 81st season of the Liga II, the second tier of the Romanian football league system, and the fifth consecutive season held in a single series. It began on 5 September 2020 and ended on 3 June 2021.

The competition format was changed and consisted of two stages. In the first stage, each team played every other team once in a regular season, followed by a promotion play-off involving six teams and a relegation play-out with two groups of seven teams. In the second stage, the first two teams were promoted to Liga I, while the 3rd- and 4th-placed teams played play-off matches against the 13th- and 14th-placed teams from Liga I over two legs. The bottom two teams in each group were relegated, and the 5th-placed teams in each group played for the fifth relegation spot to Liga III.

== Teams ==
A total of twenty-one teams contested the league, instead of twenty, due to the no-relegation rule imposed after the previous season was suspended because of the COVID-19 pandemic. Sixteen of these teams competed in the previous season, while five were promoted from Liga III.

=== Team changes ===
To Liga II

Relegated from Liga I

- None

Promoted from Liga III

- Aerostar Bacău – after one year of absence.
- FCU 1948 Craiova – after six years of absence.
- Unirea Slobozia – after five years of absence.
- Slatina – after seven years of absence.
- Comuna Recea – debut.

From Liga II

Promoted to Liga I

- UTA Arad – ended a five-year stay.
- Argeș Pitești – ended a three-year stay.

Relegated to Liga III

- None^{[note 1]}

Other changes

- Sportul Snagov and Daco-Getica București withdrew during the previous season and were subsequently dissolved, the latter being reestablished in the fifth tier.

=== Stadiums and locations ===
Location of teams in 2020–21 Liga II
Location of Bucharest teams.

Club	City	Stadium	Capacity
Aerostar Bacău	Bacău	Aerostar	1,500
ASU Politehnica Timișoara	Timișoara	Știința	1,000
Comuna Recea	Recea	Central	600
Concordia Chiajna	Chiajna	Concordia	5,123
Csíkszereda Miercurea Ciuc	Miercurea Ciuc	Municipal	1,200
CS Mioveni	Mioveni	Orășenesc	10,000
CSM Reșița	Reșița	Mircea Chivu	12,500
CSM Slatina	Slatina	1 Mai	10,000
Dunărea Călărași	Călărași	Ion Comșa	10,400
Farul Constanța	Constanța	Farul	15,520
FCU 1948 Craiova	Craiova	Ion Oblemenco	30,983
Gloria Buzău	Buzău	Municipal	18,000
Metaloglobus București	Bucharest	Metaloglobus	1,000
Pandurii Târgu Jiu	Târgu Jiu	Tudor Vladimirescu	12,518
Petrolul Ploiești	Ploiești	Ilie Oană	15,073
Rapid București	Bucharest	Regie	10,020
Ripensia Timișoara	Timișoara	Electrica	5,000
Turris Turnu Măgurele	Turnu Măgurele	Municipal	2,000
Unirea Slobozia	Slobozia	1 Mai	6,000
Universitatea Cluj	Cluj-Napoca	Cluj Arena	30,201
Viitorul Pandurii Târgu Jiu	Târgu Jiu	Tudor Vladimirescu	12,518

=== Personnel and kits ===
Note: Flags indicate national team as has been defined under FIFA eligibility rules. Players and Managers may hold more than one non-FIFA nationality.

Team	Manager	Captain	Kit manufacturer	Shirt sponsor
Aerostar Bacău	(Romania) Mihai Ionescu	(Romania) Cătălin Vraciu	Nike	Aerostar
Comuna Recea	(Romania) Florin Fabian	(Romania) Alin Bota	Hummel	DualStore
Concordia Chiajna	(Romania) Claudiu Niculescu	(Romania) Andrei Marc	Joma	—
Csíkszereda Miercurea Ciuc	(Romania) Valentin Suciu	(Romania) Attila Csürös	2Rule	Csíkszereda
Dunărea Călărași	(Romania) Cristian Pustai	(Romania) Bogdan Șandru	Joma	Consiliul Județean Călărași
Farul Constanța	(Romania) Ianis Zicu	(Romania) Paul Antoche	Joma	NOI Cash&Carry
FCU 1948 Craiova	(Romania) Eugen Trică	(Romania) Dragoș Albu	Adidas	Justice for Craiova
Gloria Buzău	(Romania) Ilie Stan	(Romania) Ciprian Petre	Joma	—
Metaloglobus București	(Romania) Gabriel Manu	(Romania) Ovidiu Herea	Jako	—
Mioveni	(Romania) Alexandru Pelici	(Romania) Robert Gherghe	Macron	Mioveni
Pandurii Târgu Jiu	(Romania) Călin Cojocaru	(Romania) Marian Pleașcă	Cottontex	Winner
Petrolul Ploiești	(Romania) Octavian Grigore	(Spain) Pol Roigé	Joma	Veolia
Politehnica Timișoara	(Romania) Dan Alexa	(Romania) Ioan Mera	Westiment / Joma	De Construct Ind, Sika
Rapid București	(Romania) Mihai Iosif	(Romania) Ionuț Voicu	Macron	Greenfield, Superbet
Reșița	(Romania) Adrian Falub	(Romania) Laurențiu Breșneni	Jako	Invest in Reșița
Ripensia Timișoara	(Romania) Cosmin Petruescu	(Romania) Alexandru Popovici	Cottontex / Macron	Almira, La Migdali, ILA
Slatina	(Romania) Cristian Stănculețu	(Romania) Vasile Gheorghe	Macron	Primăria Slatina
Turris Turnu Măgurele			Joma	Nutrelo
Unirea Slobozia	(Romania) Adrian Mihalcea	(Romania) Constantin Toma	Joma	Consiliul Județean Ialomița
Universitatea Cluj	(Romania) Costel Enache	(Romania) Srdjan Luchin	Adidas	Superbet, De'Longhi, Irum
Viitorul Pandurii Târgu Jiu	(Romania) Cristian Lupuț	(Romania) Cristian Oroș	Nike	Grimex (h), Hotel Brâncuși(a), Vitalact(a)

=== Managerial changes ===
Team	Outgoing manager	Manner of departure	Date of vacancy	Position in table	Incoming manager	Date of appointment
Ripensia	(Romania) Alexandru Pelici	Signed by Reșița	30 May 2020	Pre-season	(Romania) Cosmin Petruescu	8 June 2020
Reșița	(Romania) Dorinel Munteanu	End of contract	31 May 2020	Pre-season	(Romania) Alexandru Pelici	4 June 2020
Metaloglobus	(Romania) Marius Măldărășanu	End of contract	31 May 2020	Pre-season	(Romania) Gabriel Manu	10 August 2020
Viitorul	(Romania) Cristian Lupuț	End of contract	30 June 2020	Pre-season	(Romania) Flavius Stoican	26 August 2020
Aerostar	(Romania) Daniel Munteanu	End of contract	30 June 2020	Pre-season	(Romania) Cristian Lupuț	3 August 2020
Petrolul	(Romania) Cătălin Munteanu	Mutual agreement	3 August 2020	Pre-season	(Romania) Viorel Moldovan	9 August 2020
Rapid	(Romania) Dan Alexa	Mutual agreement	9 August 2020	Pre-season	(Romania) Adrian Iencsi	10 August 2020
FCU 1948 Craiova	(Romania) Eugen Trică	Sacked	24 August 2020	Pre-season	(Italy) Nicolò Napoli	25 August 2020
Universitatea Cluj	(Romania) Adrian Falub	Resigned	14 September 2020	14	(Romania) Costel Enache	16 September 2020
Aerostar	(Romania) Cristian Lupuț	Resigned	20 September 2020	19	(Romania) Daniel Munteanu	20 September 2020
Recea	(Romania) Ciprian Danciu	Sacked	22 September 2020	20	(Romania) Nicolae Constantin	22 September 2020
FCU 1948 Craiova	(Italy) Nicolò Napoli	Sacked	12 October 2020	1	(Romania) Dan Vasilică (caretaker)	13 October 2020
CSM Reșița	(Romania) Alexandru Pelici	Resigned	17 October 2020	15	(Romania) Alin Minteuan	4 November 2020
Rapid	(Romania) Adrian Iencsi	Sacked	27 October 2020	11	(Romania) Mihai Iosif (caretaker)	27 October 2020
Mioveni	(Romania) Claudiu Niculescu	Mutual agreement	27 October 2020	10	(Romania) Alexandru Pelici	28 October 2020
Concordia	(Romania) Florin Bratu	Sacked	6 November 2020	18	(Romania) Costel Orac (caretaker)	6 November 2020
ASU Politehnica	(Romania) Octavian Benga	Released	11 November 2020	3	(Romania) Dan Alexa	11 November 2020
Turris	(Romania) Erik Lincar	Sacked	7 November 2020	10	(Romania) Eugen Trică	10 November 2020
Slatina	(Romania) Mihai Ianovschi	Sacked	22 November 2020	17	(Romania) Mircea Voicu (caretaker)	22 November 2020
Rapid	(Romania) Mihai Iosif (caretaker)	End of tenure as a caretaker	1 December 2020	5	(Romania) Nicolae Grigore	1 December 2020
Slobozia	(Romania) Enache Costea	Mutual agreement	9 December 2020	19	(Romania) Adrian Mihalcea	9 December 2020
Slatina	(Romania) Mircea Voicu (caretaker)	End of tenure as a caretaker	10 December 2020	16	(Romania) Dinu Todoran	10 December 2020
FCU 1948 Craiova	(Romania) Dan Vasilică (caretaker)	End of tenure as a caretaker	23 December 2020	1	(Romania) Ovidiu Stîngă	24 December 2020
Concordia	(Romania) Costel Orac (caretaker)	End of tenure as a caretaker	8 January 2021	18	(Romania) Claudiu Niculescu	8 January 2021

== Regular season ==
=== League table ===
Pos	Team	Pld	W	D	L	GF	GA	GD	Pts	Promotion or relegation
1	FCU 1948 Craiova	19	9	8	2	30	15	+15	35	Qualification to Promotion play-off
2	Dunărea Călărași	19	10	4	5	25	22	+3	34	Qualification to Promotion play-off
3	Mioveni	19	9	6	4	23	11	+12	33	Qualification to Promotion play-off
4	Rapid București	19	10	3	6	33	28	+5	33	Qualification to Promotion play-off
5	Csíkszereda Miercurea Ciuc	19	9	5	5	23	15	+8	32	Qualification to Promotion play-off
6	Politehnica Timișoara	19	8	8	3	18	14	+4	32	Qualification to Promotion play-off
7	Farul Constanța	19	9	5	5	24	18	+6	32	Qualification to Relegation play-out
8	Viitorul Pandurii Târgu Jiu	19	10	2	7	32	27	+5	32	Qualification to Relegation play-out
9	Petrolul Ploiești	19	9	4	6	30	16	+14	31	Qualification to Relegation play-out
10	Metaloglobus București	19	9	3	7	25	15	+10	30	Qualification to Relegation play-out
11	Universitatea Cluj	19	9	2	8	20	19	+1	29	Qualification to Relegation play-out
12	Gloria Buzău	19	6	8	5	21	20	+1	26	Qualification to Relegation play-out
13	Concordia Chiajna	19	6	6	7	21	18	+3	24	Qualification to Relegation play-out
14	Comuna Recea	19	6	5	8	29	29	0	23	Qualification to Relegation play-out
15	Ripensia Timișoara	19	6	4	9	15	30	−15	22	Qualification to Relegation play-out
16	Unirea Slobozia	19	5	4	10	15	26	−11	19	Qualification to Relegation play-out
17	Reșița	19	5	4	10	10	26	−16	19	Qualification to Relegation play-out
18	Slatina	19	4	3	12	17	25	−8	15	Qualification to Relegation play-out
19	Pandurii Târgu Jiu	19	3	4	12	18	37	−19	13	Qualification to Relegation play-out
20	Aerostar Bacău	19	2	4	13	19	37	−18	10	Qualification to Relegation play-out
21	Turris-Oltul Turnu Măgurele (E)	0	0	0	0	0	0	0	0 (Note: Turris Turnu Măgurele withdrew from after the 14th round and all its results were canceled.)	Excluded

Updated to match(es) played on 28 March 2021. Source: FRF (in Romanian), Soccerway
Rules for classification: 1) Points; 2) Head-to-head points; 3) Head-to-head goal difference; 4) Head-to-head goals scored; 5) Head-to-head away goals scored; 6)Goal difference; 7) Goals scored; .
(E) Eliminated

=== Results ===
Home \ Away	FCU	DUN	MIO	RAP	CSI	ASU	FAR	VTJ	PET	MET	UCJ	GBZ	CON	REC	RIP	USZ	REȘ	SLA	PAN	AER
FCU 1948 Craiova		2–1	1–2	5–0			0–0			1–0		1–1			4–1			2–1		0–0
Dunărea Călărași			1–0				1–1	2–1		1–0		0–2		3–0	2–2					3–2
Mioveni					1–1			1–2		0–1	0–1	0–0		1–1			1–0			5–1
Rapid București		4–0	0–3		1–3		2–1				1–0		4–2		2–2		0–0		2–1	
Csíkszereda Miercurea Ciuc	1–1	0–1				2–0			1–2		2–1		1–0			0–1	2–0	1–0	1–1	
Politehnica Timișoara	0–0	1–1	0–0	0–2			2–1		1–0	1–0		2–0			2–0			1–0		
Farul Constanța			1–1		0–2			1–0		1–2		2–2		3–2			1–0			1–0
Viitorul Pandurii Târgu Jiu	2–4			1–3	0–0	0–1			1–1		1–2		1–0			3–1	2–1	2–1	4–3	
Petrolul Ploiești	0–1	0–1	0–1	2–0			1–2			1–0		1–1			5–0			1–1		1–4
Metaloglobus București				2–4	2–1			1–2			0–0	5–1	1–1	2–0			0–0		3–0	3–0
Universitatea Cluj	1–0	2–1				0–1			1–2				1–1		1–0	3–1		2–1	2–0	
Gloria Buzău				0–0	0–1			2–1			2–1		1–1	2–0		2–0	0–1		1–1	1–1
Concordia Chiajna	0–0	2–1	0–1			2–0	1–2		0–0						0–1	3–1		3–2	4–0	
Comuna Recea	3–3			2–1	0–1	3–3		3–4	1–2		1–0		0–0			2–0	6–0		2–0	
Ripensia Timișoara			0–3		1–1		1–0	0–2		0–2		2–1		0–0						2–0
Unirea Slobozia	0–0	2–2	0–0	2–1		0–0	0–2		0–3	0–1					2–0			0–3		
Reșița	0–2	0–1				0–0			0–4		2–1		1–0		2–0	0–3		1–1	1–2	
Slatina		0–1	0–1	0–3			1–1			1–0		0–2		2–0	0–1					2–1
Pandurii Târgu Jiu	2–3	1–2	1–2			1–1	0–1		0–4						1–2	1–0		2–1		
Aerostar Bacău				2–3	3–2	2–2		0–3			0–1		0–1	2–3		0–2	0–1		1–1	

Updated to match(es) played on 28 March 2021. Source: Liga 2
Legend: Blue = home team win; Yellow = draw; Red = away team win.

== Promotion play-off ==
A promotion play-off tournament between the best 6 teams (after 20 rounds) will be played to decide the two teams that will be promoted to Liga I, meanwhile the third-placed and fourth-placed teams would play another play-off match against the 13th-placed and 14th-placed teams from Liga I. The teams will start the promotion play-offs with all the points accumulated in the regular season.

=== Table ===
Pos	Team	Pld	W	D	L	GF	GA	GD	Pts	Relegation
1	FCU 1948 Craiova (C, P)	10	5	4	1	13	7	+6	54	Promotion to Liga I
2	Rapid București (P)	10	5	1	4	14	11	+3	49	Promotion to Liga I
3	Mioveni (O, P)	10	3	6	1	18	11	+7	48	Qualification to Liga I play-off
4	Dunărea Călărași (Q)	10	2	4	4	10	18	−8	44	Qualification to Liga I play-off
5	Csíkszereda Miercurea Ciuc	10	2	4	4	9	11	−2	42	
6	Politehnica Timișoara	10	2	3	5	9	15	−6	41	

Source: FRF (in Romanian), Soccerway
Rules for classification: 1) Points; 2) Head-to-head points; 3) Head-to-head goal difference; 4) Head-to-head goals scored; 5) Head-to-head away goals scored; 6) Goal difference; 7) Goals scored.
(C) Champions; (O) Play-off winners; (P) Promoted; (Q) Qualified for promotion play-off

=== Results ===
Home \ Away	FCU	RAP	MIO	DUN	CSI	ASU
FCU 1948 Craiova		1–0	4–2	0–0	0–0	1–0
Rapid București	1–3		1–1	4–1	2–0	1–0
Mioveni	0–0	1–0		1–1	0–0	4–0
Dunărea Călărași	1–1	3–2	1–5		0–2	0–0
Csíkszereda Miercurea Ciuc	1–2	0–1	2–2	1–2		2–2
Politehnica Timisoara	2–1	1–2	2–2	2–1	0–1	

Source: FRF
Legend: Blue = home team win; Yellow = draw; Red = away team win.

=== Positions by round ===
Team ╲ Round	19	20	21	22	23	24	25	26	27	28	29
FCU 1948 Craiova	1	2	2	2	1	1	1	1	1	1	1
Dunărea Călărași	2	3	4	4	4	4	4	4	4	4	4
Mioveni	3	4	3	3	3	3	3	3	3	3	3
Rapid București	4	1	1	1	2	2	2	2	2	2	2
Csíkszereda Miercurea Ciuc	5	6	6	6	5	5	5	6	6	5	5
Politehnica Timisoara	6	5	5	5	6	6	6	5	5	6	6

Source: FRF

== Relegation play-out ==
A relegation play-out tournament between the last 15 ranked teams at the end of the regular season will be played to decide the five teams that will be relegated to Liga III. Two play-out groups will be made: the first group will consist of teams ranked 7, 10, 11, 14, 15, 18 and 19, and the second group will consist of teams ranked 8, 9, 12, 13, 16, 17 and 20, at the end of the regular season. The teams will start the promotion play-offs with all the points accumulated in the regular season. Two teams from each group will be relegated to Liga III, while the 5th placed teams in both groups will meet in a tie to avoid relegation.

=== Group A ===
==== Table ====
Pos	Team	Pld	W	D	L	GF	GA	GD	Pts	Relegation
1	Farul Constanța	6	3	1	2	10	8	+2	42	
2	Universitatea Cluj	6	3	1	2	13	9	+4	39	
3	Metaloglobus București	6	3	0	3	6	7	−1	39	
4	Ripensia Timișoara	6	4	2	0	9	3	+6	36	
5	Comuna Recea (R)	6	4	0	2	18	10	+8	35	Qualification to Liga II play-out
6	Slatina (R)	6	1	1	4	8	15	−7	19	Relegation to Liga III
7	Pandurii Târgu Jiu (R)	6	0	1	5	5	17	−12	14	Relegation to Liga III

Source: FRF (in Romanian), Soccerway
Rules for classification: 1) Points; 2) Goal difference; 3) Goals scored; 4) Head-to-head points; 5) Head-to-head goal difference; 6) Head-to-head goals scored; 7) Head-to-head away goals scored.
(R) Relegated

=== Results ===
Home \ Away	FAR	UCJ	MET	RIP	REC	SLA	PAN
Farul Constanța		1–3		1–1	3–1		
Universitatea Cluj			2–0		2–3		1–1
Metaloglobus București	1–0					1–0	3–1
Ripensia Timișoara		2–1	1–0		2–1		
Comuna Recea			3–1			5–2	5–0
Slatina	1–3	2–4		0–0			
Pandurii Târgu Jiu	1–2			0–3		2–3	

Source: FRF
Legend: Blue = home team win; Yellow = draw; Red = away team win.

=== Group B ===
==== Table ====
Pos	Team	Pld	W	D	L	GF	GA	GD	Pts	Promotion or relegation
1	Petrolul Ploiești	6	3	2	1	8	4	+4	42	
2	Viitorul Pandurii Târgu Jiu	6	3	0	3	15	14	+1	41	
3	Gloria Buzău	6	2	3	1	9	7	+2	35	
4	Concordia Chiajna	6	3	1	2	8	6	+2	34	
5	Unirea Slobozia (O)	6	2	4	0	8	5	+3	29	Qualification to Liga II play-out
6	Reșița (R)	6	2	1	3	8	7	+1	26	Relegation to Liga III
7	Aerostar Bacău (R)	6	0	1	5	4	17	−13	11	Relegation to Liga III

Source: FRF (in Romanian), Soccerway
Rules for classification: 1) Points; 2) Goal difference; 3) Goals scored; 4) Head-to-head points; 5) Head-to-head goal difference; 6) Head-to-head goals scored; 7) Head-to-head away goals scored.
(O) Play-off winners; (R) Relegated

==== Results ====
Home \ Away	PET	VTJ	GBZ	CON	USZ	REȘ	AER
Petrolul Ploiești			1–1	0–1			2–0
Viitorul Pandurii Târgu Jiu	1–3		2–4			4–3	
Gloria Buzău				0–3	0–0		3–0
Concordia Chiajna		0–2			1–1		3–1
Unirea Slobozia	1–1	3–1				1–0	
Reșița	0–1		1–1	2–0			
Aerostar Bacău		1–5			2–2	0–2	

Source: FRF
Legend: Blue = home team win; Yellow = draw; Red = away team win.

== Liga II play-out ==
The 5th-placed teams of the Liga II relegation play-out groups face each other in order to determine the last relegated team to Liga III.

Team 1	Agg.	Team 2	1st leg	2nd leg
Comuna Recea	2–3	Unirea Slobozia	2–0	0–3

First leg

15 May 2021	Comuna Recea	2–0	Unirea Slobozia	Recea
11:00 EEST (UTC+3)	Balha 72'; Oiță 90+2'	Report		Stadium: Central; Referee: Iulian Călin (Ștefănești)

Second leg

22 May 2021	Unirea Slobozia	3–0	Comuna Recea	Slobozia
11:00 EEST (UTC+3)	Afalna 53'; G. Lazăr 83'; M. Ciobanu 90+4'	Report		Stadium: 1 Mai; Referee: Iulian Dima (Bucharest)

== Season statistics ==
Regular season, promotion play-off and relegation play-out overall statistics

As of 23 May 2021

=== Top scorers ===
Rank	Player	Club	Regular	Play-off	Play-out	Total
1	(Romania) Marius Coman	Comuna Recea	10	–	5	15
2	(Romania) Cătălin Hlistei	Rapid București	11	3	–	14
2	(Romania) Ovidiu Herea	Metaloglobus București	11	–	3	14
3	(Romania) Claudiu Bălan	FCU 1948 Craiova	8	3	–	11
4	(Romania) Daniel Paraschiv	Viitorul Pandurii Târgu Jiu	7	–	3	10
4	(Romania) Adrian Bălan	Rapid București	5	5	–	10
5	(Romania) Gabriel Dodoi	Pandurii Târgu Jiu	7	–	2	9
5	(Albania) Armando Vajushi	Petrolul Ploiești	7	–	2	9
5	(Romania) Bogdan Rusu	Mioveni	6	3	–	9
5	(Romania) Ștefan Blănaru	Mioveni	4	5	–	9
5	(Romania) Darius Buia	Viitorul Pandurii Târgu Jiu	3	–	6	9
6	(Romania) Vasile Buhăescu	Petrolul Ploiești	6	–	2	8
7	(Romania) Cosmin Tucaliuc	Gloria Buzău	7	–	-	7
7	(Italy) Andrea Compagno	FCU 1948 Craiova	2	5	–	7
7	(Argentina) Juan Bauza	Csíkszereda Miercurea Ciuc	5	2	–	7
7	(Albania) Azdren Llullaku	Concordia Chiajna	5	2	–	7
7	(Romania) Andrei Hergheligiu	Concordia Chiajna	5	–	2	7
7	(Romania) Valentin Alexandru	Dunărea Călărași	5	2	–	7
7	(Romania) Ianis Stoica	Slatina	3	–	4	7

=== Hat-tricks ===
As of 23 May 2021

Player	For	Against	Result	Date	Round
(Romania) Paul Batin	Comuna Recea	Slatina	5–2 (H)	30 April 2022	6 (Play-out)
(Romania) Ovidiu Herea	Metaloglobus București	Pandurii Târgu Jiu	3–1 (H)	30 April 2021	6 (Play-out)
(Romania) Claudiu Bălan	Rapid București	FCU 1948 Craiova	1–3 (A)	17 May 2021	9 (Play-off)

== See also ==
- 2020–21 Liga I
- 2020–21 Liga III
- 2020–21 Liga IV
- 2020–21 Cupa României
