= 2019–20 Liga II =

80th season of second-tier football league in Romania

Liga II
- Season: 2019–20
- Promoted: UTA Arad; Argeș Pitești
- Relegated: Sportul Snagov; Daco-Getica București
- Matches: 231
- Goals: 562 (2.43 per match)
- Top goalscorer: Albert Voinea (15)
- Biggest home win: Buzău 7–0 Snagov
- Biggest away win: Reșița 1–7 Viitorul T.J. M. Ciuc 0–6 UTA Arad
- Highest scoring: Reșița 1–7 Viitorul T.J.
- Longest winning run: 6 matches: Turris Turnu Măgurele
- Longest unbeaten run: 13 matches: Mioveni; Argeș Pitești
- Longest winless run: 16 matches: Pandurii Târgu Jiu
- Longest losing run: 6 matches: Sportul Snagov
- Highest attendance: 9,000; Rapid 1–0 Petrolul (16 October 2019)
- Lowest attendance: 40; Viitorul T.J. 1–0 Metalo. (26 October 2019)
- All statistics correct as of 2 August 2020.

The 2019–20 Liga II (also known as 2019–20 Liga II Casa Pariurilor) was the 80th season of the Liga II, the second tier of the Romanian football league system. The season began on 3 August 2019 and ended on 2 August 2020. A total of 20 teams contested the league. It was the fourth Liga II season with a single series. The season was initially scheduled to be played in a round-robin tournament. The first two teams would be promoted to Liga I at the end of the season and the third-placed team would play a play-off match against the 12th-placed team from Liga I. The last five teams would relegate to Liga III.

The season was interrupted on 9 March 2020, after 25 rounds, due to COVID-19 pandemic. After two months of inactivity, on 14 May 2020, the Romanian Football Federation announced that a promotion play-off tournament between the first 6 ranked teams (after 25 rounds) will be played to decide the two teams that will be promoted to Liga I and the third-placed, team that would play another play-off match against the 12th-placed team from Liga I. No teams will be relegated this season, apart from the clubs that were already dissolved or excluded (Sportul Snagov and Daco-Getica București).

== Team changes ==
=== To Liga II ===
Promoted from Liga III

- SCM Gloria Buzău
  (debut)
- Rapid București
  (after 3 years of absence)
- Turris Turnu Măgurele
  (debut)
- CSM Reșița
  (after 11 years of absence)
- Miercurea Ciuc
  (debut)

Relegated from Liga I

- Dunărea Călărași
  (after 1 year of absence)
- Concordia Chiajna
  (after 8 years of absence)

=== From Liga II ===
Relegated to Liga III

- Luceafărul Oradea
  (ended 3-year stay)
- Aerostar Bacău
  (ended 1-year stay)
- ACS Poli Timișoara
  (ended 1-year stay)
- Balotești
  (ended 5-year stay)
- Dacia Unirea Brăila
  (ended 9-year stay)

Promoted to Liga I

- Chindia Târgoviște
  (ended 4-year stay)
- Academica Clinceni
  (ended 7-year stay)

=== Excluded and spared teams ===
Luceafărul Oradea withdrew from Liga II on 30 July 2019, with three days before the start of the championship and chose to enroll in the Liga III. Place of Luceafărul was occupied by Energeticianul.

=== Other changes ===
Energeticianul was moved from Petroșani to Târgu Jiu, but the club will play its home matches on Municipal Stadium in Drobeta-Turnu Severin, until Tudor Vladimirescu Stadium in Târgu Jiu will be opened.

=== Renamed teams ===
CSM Școlar Reșița was renamed as CSM Reșița after recovering its right to use the brand and record of the old entity.

Energeticianul was renamed as Viitorul Târgu Jiu.

== Stadiums by capacity ==
| Club | City | Stadium | Capacity |
|---|---|---|---|
| Argeș | Pitești | Nicolae Dobrin | 15,000 |
| ASU Politehnica | Timișoara | Știința | 1,000 |
| Concordia | Chiajna | Concordia | 5,123 |
| CSM | Reșița | Mircea Chivu | 12,500 |
| Daco-Getica | Bucharest | Colentina | 6,000 |
| Dunărea | Călărași | Ion Comșa | 10,400 |
| Farul | Constanța | Farul | 15,520 |
| Metaloglobus | Bucharest | Metaloglobus | 1,000 |
| Miercurea Ciuc | Miercurea Ciuc | Municipal | 1,200 |
| Mioveni | Mioveni | Orășenesc | 10,000 |
| Pandurii | Târgu Jiu | Tudor Vladimirescu | 12,518 |
| Petrolul | Ploiești | Ilie Oană | 15,073 |
| Rapid | Bucharest | Regie | 10,020 |
| Ripensia | Timișoara | Electrica | 5,000 |
| SCM Gloria | Buzău | Municipal | 18,000 |
| Sportul | Snagov | Voința | 2,000 |
| Turris | Turnu Măgurele | Municipal | 2,000 |
| Universitatea | Cluj-Napoca | Cluj Arena | 30,201 |
| UTA | Arad | Motorul | 4,000 |
| Viitorul | Târgu Jiu | Tudor Vladimirescu | 12,518 |

== Stadiums by locations ==
Location of teams in 2019–20 Liga II
Location of Bucharest teams.

== Personnel and kits ==
Note: Flags indicate national team as has been defined under FIFA eligibility rules. Players and Managers may hold more than one non-FIFA nationality.

| Team | Manager | Captain | Kit manufacturer | Shirt sponsor |
|---|---|---|---|---|
| Argeș Pitești | (Romania) Ionuț Badea | (Romania) Vasile Buhăescu | Macron | Primăria Pitești |
| ASU Politehnica Timișoara | (Romania) Octavian Benga | (Romania) Ioan Mera | Westiment / Macron | De Construct Ind |
| Concordia Chiajna | (Romania) Florin Bratu | (Romania) Petre Ivanovici | Joma | — |
| CSM Reșița | (Romania) Dorinel Munteanu | (Romania) Laurențiu Rus | Jako | Primăria Reșița |
| Daco-Getica București | — | — | — | — |
| Dunărea Călărași | (Romania) Cristian Pustai | (Romania) Georgian Honciu | Joma | CJ Călărași |
| Farul Constanța | (Romania) Ianis Zicu | (Romania) Vlad Muțiu | Joma | — |
| Metaloglobus București | (Romania) Marius Măldărășanu | (Romania) Ovidiu Herea | Jako | — |
| Miercurea Ciuc | (Romania) Valentin Suciu | (Hungary) Adrián Majzik | 2Rule | Csíkszereda |
| Mioveni | (Romania) Claudiu Niculescu | (Romania) Ionuț Burnea | Joma | Primăria Mioveni |
| Pandurii Târgu Jiu | (Romania) Călin Cojocaru | (Romania) Daniel Ciobanu | Nike | — |
| Petrolul Ploiești | (Romania) Costel Enache | (Romania) Laurențiu Marinescu | Joma | Veolia |
| Rapid București | (Romania) Dan Alexa | (Romania) Ionuț Voicu | Macron | Greenfield, Superbet |
| Ripensia Timișoara | (Romania) Alexandru Pelici | (Romania) Claudiu Apro | ILA | Almira |
| Sportul Snagov | — | — | — | — |
| SCM Gloria Buzău | (Romania) Ilie Stan | (Romania) Marius Ioniță | Joma | — |
| Turris Turnu Măgurele | (Romania) Erik Lincar | (Romania) Silviu Pană | Joma | Nutrelo |
| Universitatea Cluj | (Romania) Adrian Falub | (Romania) Dorin Goga | Adidas | IRUM, De'Longhi, Untold |
| UTA Arad | (Romania) László Balint | (Romania) Ciprian Rus | Saller | Primăria Arad |
| Viitorul Târgu Jiu | (Romania) Cristian Lupuț | (Romania) Cristian Oroș | Joma | Hotel Brâncuși, Vitalact |

== Managerial changes ==
| Team | Outgoing manager | Manner of departure | Date of vacancy | Position in table | Incoming manager | Date of appointment |
|---|---|---|---|---|---|---|
| Concordia | (Romania) Adrian Falub | Mutual agreement | 6 June 2019 | Pre-season | (Romania) Laurențiu Diniță | 6 June 2019 |
| Universitatea | (Romania) Bogdan Lobonț | Sacked | 13 June 2019 | Pre-season | (Romania) Cristian Dulca | 1 July 2019 |
| SCM Gloria | (Romania) George Timiș | Promoted as Director of football | 30 June 2019 | Pre-season | (Romania) Ilie Stan | 1 July 2019 |
| Mioveni | (Romania) Marius Stoica (caretaker) | End of tenure as a caretaker | 30 June 2019 | Pre-season | (Romania) Marius Stoica | 1 July 2019 |
| Metaloglobus | (Romania) László Balint | Signed by UTA Arad | 30 June 2019 | Pre-season | (Romania) M. Măldărășanu | 1 July 2019 |
| UTA Arad | (Romania) Ionuț Popa | End of contract | 30 June 2019 | Pre-season | (Romania) László Balint | 1 July 2019 |
| Snagov | (Romania) Eugen Trică | Signed by FCU Craiova | 30 June 2019 | Pre-season | (Romania) Valeriu Răchită | 16 July 2019 |
| FC Argeș | (Romania) Augustin Eduard | End of contract | 30 June 2019 | Pre-season | (Romania) Nicolae Dică | 1 July 2019 |
| Farul | (Romania) Petre Grigoraș | End of contract | 30 June 2019 | Pre-season | (Romania) Ianis Zicu | 3 July 2019 |
| Petrolul | (Romania) Gheorghe Mulțescu | End of contract | 30 June 2019 | Pre-season | (Romania) Flavius Stoican | 1 July 2019 |
| Dunărea | (Romania) Dan Alexa | Signed by Astra Giurgiu | 30 June 2019 | Pre-season | (Romania) Cristian Pustai | 1 July 2019 |
| Viitorul T.J. | (Romania) Viorel Tănase | End of contract | 30 June 2019 | Pre-season | (Romania) Cristian Lupuț | 31 July 2019 |
| ASU Poli | (Romania) Cosmin Petruescu | Resigned | 31 August 2019 | 15 | (Romania) Mugur Gușatu | 31 August 2019 |
| Snagov | (Romania) Valeriu Răchită | Promoted as General Manager | 31 August 2019 | 20 | (Romania) Viorel Dumitrescu | 31 August 2019 |
| Universitatea | (Romania) Cristian Dulca | Mutual agreement | 2 September 2019 | 17 | (Romania) Adrian Falub | 4 September 2019 |
| Turris | (Romania) Erik Lincar | Mutual agreement | 1 October 2019 | 1 | (Romania) Florin Bratu | 3 October 2019 |
| Concordia | (Romania) Laurențiu Diniță | Sacked | 5 October 2019 | 11 | (Romania) Erik Lincar | 7 October 2019 |
| Argeș Pitești | (Romania) Nicolae Dică | Mutual agreement | 7 October 2019 | 6 | (Romania) Ionuț Badea | 9 October 2019 |
| Snagov | (Romania) Viorel Dumitrescu | Mutual agreement | 13 October 2019 | 20 | (Romania) Valentin Ivan | 13 October 2019 |
| Pandurii | (Romania) Adrian Bogoi | Mutual agreement | 22 October 2019 | 18 | (Romania) Tiberiu Bălan | 22 October 2019 |
| Turris | (Romania) Florin Bratu | Mutual agreement | 22 October 2019 | 2 | (Romania) Marius Baciu | 26 October 2019 |
| Politehnica | (Romania) Mugur Gușatu | Resigned | 23 October 2019 | 16 | (Romania) Antonio Foale (caretaker) | 23 October 2019 |
| Daco-Getica | (Romania) Marius Baciu | Mutual agreement | 23 October 2019 | 19 | — | — |
| Snagov | (Romania) Valentin Ivan | Mutual agreement | 1 November 2019 | 19 | (Romania) Laurențiu Tudor | 1 November 2019 |
| Politehnica | (Romania) Antonio Foale (caretaker) | End of tenure as a caretaker | 6 November 2019 | 11 | (Romania) Octavian Benga | 6 November 2019 |
| CSM Reșița | (Romania) Leontin Doană | Sacked | 10 November 2019 | 16 | (Romania) Dorinel Munteanu | 10 November 2019 |
| Pandurii | (Romania) Tiberiu Bălan | Released | 10 November 2019 | 19 | (Romania) Călin Cojocaru | 12 November 2019 |
| Snagov | (Romania) Laurențiu Tudor | Mutual agreement | 30 November 2019 | 18 | (Romania) Răzvan Ciodar (caretaker) | 30 November 2019 |
| Petrolul | (Romania) Flavius Stoican | Resigned | 11 December 2019 | 8 | (Romania) Costel Enache | 16 December 2019 |
| Turris | (Romania) Marius Baciu | Mutual agreement | 27 December 2019 | 5 | (Romania) Erik Lincar | 2 January 2020 |
| Concordia | (Romania) Erik Lincar | Released | 27 December 2019 | 16 | (Romania) Florin Bratu | 6 January 2020 |
| Mioveni | (Romania) Marius Stoica | Sacked | 2 February 2020 | 2 | (Romania) Claudiu Niculescu | 2 February 2020 |
| Rapid | (Romania) Daniel Pancu | Sacked | 10 March 2020 | 6 | (Romania) Dan Alexa | 13 March 2020 |
| Petrolul | (Romania) Costel Enache | Mutual agreement | 30 July 2020 | 6 | (Romania) Cătălin Munteanu | 31 July 2020 |

== Regular season ==
=== League table ===
| Pos | Team | Pld | W | D | L | GF | GA | GD | Pts | Promotion or relegation |
|---|---|---|---|---|---|---|---|---|---|---|
| 1 | UTA Arad (Q) | 23 | 15 | 5 | 3 | 49 | 13 | +36 | 50 | Qualification to Promotion play-offs |
| 2 | Mioveni (Q) | 23 | 10 | 9 | 4 | 36 | 22 | +14 | 39 | Qualification to Promotion play-offs |
| 3 | Turris Turnu Măgurele (Q) | 22 | 11 | 6 | 5 | 36 | 25 | +11 | 39 | Qualification to Promotion play-offs |
| 4 | Argeș Pitești (Q) | 23 | 10 | 8 | 5 | 34 | 25 | +9 | 38 | Qualification to Promotion play-offs |
| 5 | Petrolul Ploiești (Q) | 23 | 10 | 8 | 5 | 23 | 20 | +3 | 38 | Qualification to Promotion play-offs |
| 6 | Rapid București (Q) | 23 | 10 | 7 | 6 | 32 | 20 | +12 | 37 | Qualification to Promotion play-offs |
| 7 | Metaloglobus București | 23 | 10 | 7 | 6 | 28 | 20 | +8 | 37 | |
| 8 | SCM Gloria Buzău | 23 | 9 | 6 | 8 | 35 | 27 | +8 | 33 | |
| 9 | Farul Constanța | 23 | 9 | 6 | 8 | 27 | 20 | +7 | 33 | |
| 10 | Viitorul Târgu Jiu | 22 | 9 | 6 | 7 | 30 | 25 | +5 | 33 | |
| 11 | ASU Politehnica Timișoara | 22 | 8 | 8 | 6 | 20 | 12 | +8 | 32 | |
| 12 | Dunărea Călărași | 23 | 8 | 7 | 8 | 29 | 30 | −1 | 31 | |
| 13 | Ripensia Timișoara | 23 | 6 | 10 | 7 | 28 | 34 | −6 | 28 | |
| 14 | Universitatea Cluj | 23 | 5 | 12 | 6 | 29 | 26 | +3 | 27 | |
| 15 | CSM Reșița | 22 | 6 | 6 | 10 | 30 | 35 | −5 | 24 | |
| 16 | Concordia Chiajna (Note: Concordia Chiajna, Miercurea Ciuc and Pandurii Târgu Jiu were spared from relegation after the season was suspended due to COVID-19 pandemic.) | 22 | 6 | 6 | 10 | 20 | 30 | −10 | 24 | Spared from relegation |
| 17 | Miercurea Ciuc | 23 | 5 | 7 | 11 | 17 | 33 | −16 | 22 | Spared from relegation |
| 18 | Sportul Snagov (R) | 23 | 2 | 3 | 18 | 16 | 59 | −43 | 9 (Note: Sportul Snagov withdrew from Liga II during the winter break and lost all the matches from the second part by forfeit.) | Relegation to Liga III |
| 19 | Pandurii Târgu Jiu | 23 | 1 | 5 | 17 | 10 | 53 | −43 | 8 | Spared from relegation |
| 20 | Daco-Getica București (R) | 0 | 0 | 0 | 0 | 0 | 0 | 0 | 0 (Note: Daco-Getica București withdrew from Liga II after the 13th round and all its results were canceled.) | Relegation to Liga III |

Updated to match(es) played on 14 May 2020. Source: FRF (in Romanian), Soccerway
Rules for classification: 1) Points; 2) Head-to-head points; 3) Head-to-head goal difference; 4) Head-to-head goals scored; 5) Head-to-head away goals scored; 6) Goal difference; 7) Goals scored.
(Q) Qualified for the phase indicated; (R) Relegated

=== Season results ===
| Home \ Away | ARG | ASU | CON | REȘ | DUN | FAR | MET | MIE | MIO | PAN | PET | RAP | RIP | SCM | SNA | TUR | UCJ | UTA | VTJ |
|---|---|---|---|---|---|---|---|---|---|---|---|---|---|---|---|---|---|---|---|
| Argeș Pitești | | | | 3–2 | | 2–2 | | | 1–1 | 2–1 | 1–1 | 0–2 | 1–2 | 3–1 | 3–0 | 3–2 | 1–0 | 0–0 | |
| ASU Politehnica Timișoara | 3–0 | | 0–0 | 0–0 | 1–1 | 0–0 | 1–1 | 1–0 | 0–1 | 1–0 | | 0–0 | | | 2–0 | | | null | |
| Concordia Chiajna | 1–1 | 2–1 | | 2–1 | 1–0 | 2–1 | 1–1 | | 1–1 | | | 1–3 | | | 2–0 | 0–3 | | | |
| CSM Reșița | | | | | | 2–1 | | | 0–1 | 3–1 | 1–1 | 1–2 | 1–2 | 2–1 | | 1–1 | 2–0 | 2–3 | 1–7 |
| Dunărea Călărași | 1–2 | | | 2–1 | | 1–1 | 3–1 | 2–1 | | 4–0 | 1–3 | 0–0 | 1–1 | | | 3–2 | 0–3 | 1–0 | |
| Farul Constanța | | | 3–1 | | 1–0 | | | 2–0 | 2–0 | 5–0 | 0–0 | 3–1 | 1–0 | | 1–0 | 0–1 | 3–2 | | |
| Metaloglobus București | 0–0 | | | 1–0 | | 1–0 | | 3–0 | | 0–1 | 1–2 | 0–0 | 3–0 | | 3–0 | 1–0 | 2–0 | 1–1 | |
| Miercurea Ciuc | 0–0 | | | 1–0 | 1–1 | | 3–0 | | | 2–2 | 1–2 | 1–0 | 2–2 | 1–1 | | 1–0 | 1–1 | 0–6 | |
| Mioveni | 2–0 | 0–1 | | 1–1 | 1–1 | | 2–2 | 3–0 | | 4–0 | | 1–5 | | 0–0 | 2–1 | 5–2 | | | 0–2 |
| Pandurii Târgu Jiu | 0–4 | 0–3 | 0–0 | 1–4 | | | | | | | 0–1 | | 0–0 | 0–0 | | 0–1 | 0–1 | 2–5 | 0–0 |
| Petrolul Ploiești | | 1–0 | 3–0 | | 2–0 | 0–0 | 0–0 | 1–0 | 0–0 | | | | | 0–1 | 1–1 | | | 0–3 | 3–1 |
| Rapid București | | 1–0 | 3–1 | 0–1 | | 0–0 | | | | 4–0 | 1–0 | | 0–0 | 3–2 | | 0–0 | 1–1 | 2–0 | 1–2 |
| Ripensia Timișoara | 1–2 | 1–1 | 2–1 | | 1–1 | | 3–0 | | 0–5 | | 0–1 | | | 1–2 | 3–1 | | | 2–1 | 0–0 |
| SCM Gloria Buzău | | 0–1 | 2–1 | | 3–1 | 2–0 | 1–2 | 1–0 | 0–1 | | | | 3–3 | | 7–0 | | 2–2 | | 0–0 |
| Sportul Snagov | 0–3 | | | 3–3 | 0–2 | | 0–3 | 0–1 | | 3–2 | | 3–2 | | 0–3 | | 2–3 | 1–1 | 0–3 | 0–3 |
| Turris Turnu Măgurele | | 2–0 | 2–1 | | | 2–0 | | | | 2–0 | 1–1 | 3–1 | 3–3 | 2–1 | | | 1–1 | 1–1 | 2–0 |
| Universitatea Cluj | 1–1 | 0–0 | 2–1 | 1–1 | | | 1–2 | | 2–2 | | 4–0 | | 1–1 | 0–2 | | | | 1–1 | 3–0 |
| UTA Arad | | 1–0 | 1–0 | | 3–0 | 1–0 | | 3–0 | 1–1 | | 3–0 | | 3–0 | 3–0 | 4–0 | | | | 2–0 |
| Viitorul Târgu Jiu | 2–1 | 1–4 | 0–0 | | 1–3 | 2–1 | 1–0 | 1–1 | 0–1 | 4–0 | | | | | 2–1 | | 1–1 | | |

Updated to match(es) played on 14 May 2020. Source: Liga 2
Legend: Blue = home team win; Yellow = draw; Red = away team win.

== Promotion play-offs ==
A promotion play-off tournament between the best 6 teams (after 25 rounds) will be played to decide the two teams that will be promoted to Liga I and the third-placed, team that would play another play-off match against the 12th-placed team from Liga I. The teams started the promotion play-offs with half of the points accumulated until the interruption of the regular season.

=== Table ===
| Pos | Team | Pld | W | D | L | GF | GA | GD | Pts | Promotion or relegation |
|---|---|---|---|---|---|---|---|---|---|---|
| 1 | UTA Arad (C, P) | 5 | 1 | 2 | 2 | 8 | 8 | 0 | 30 | Promotion to Liga I |
| 2 | Argeș Pitești (P) | 5 | 2 | 2 | 1 | 7 | 6 | +1 | 27 | Promotion to Liga I |
| 3 | Mioveni (Q) | 5 | 2 | 1 | 2 | 5 | 6 | −1 | 27 | Qualification to Liga I play-off |
| 4 | Turris Turnu Măgurele | 5 | 1 | 3 | 1 | 5 | 5 | 0 | 26 | |
| 5 | Petrolul Ploiești | 5 | 1 | 3 | 1 | 4 | 4 | 0 | 25 (Note: Head-to-head : Rapid suffered rounding from odd points(37), while Petrolul from even points(38)) | |
| 6 | Rapid București | 5 | 1 | 3 | 1 | 4 | 4 | 0 | 25 | |

Source: FRF (in Romanian), Soccerway
Rules for classification: 1) Points; 2) Head-to-head points; 3) Head-to-head goal difference; 4) Head-to-head goals scored; 5) Head-to-head away goals scored; 6) Goal difference; 7) Goals scored.
(C) Champions; (P) Promoted; (Q) Qualified for the phase indicated

=== Results ===
| Home \ Away | ARG | MIO | PET | RAP | TUR | UTA |
|---|---|---|---|---|---|---|
| Argeș Pitești | | 2–3 | | | | 1–1 |
| Mioveni | | | 1–2 | 0–0 | | 0–2 |
| Petrolul Ploiești | 1–2 | | | 0–0 | | |
| Rapid București | 1–2 | | | | 1–1 | |
| Turris Turnu Măgurele | 0–0 | 0–1 | 0–0 | | | |
| UTA Arad | | | 1–1 | 1–2 | 3–4 | |

Source: FRF
Legend: Blue = home team win; Yellow = draw; Red = away team win.

== Liga I play-off ==
The 12th-placed team of the Liga I faced the 3rd-placed team of the Liga II

| Team 1 | Agg. | Team 2 | 1st leg | 2nd leg |
|---|---|---|---|---|
| Chindia Târgoviște | 3–1 | Mioveni | 2–0 | 1–1 |

| 9 August 2020 | Chindia Târgoviște | 2–0 | Mioveni | Ploiești, Romania |
| 18:00 EEST (UTC+3) | Bic 14' Ivančić 74' | | | Stadium: Ilie Oană; Attendance: 0 Referee: István Kovács (Carei) |

| 12 August 2020 | Mioveni | 1–1 (1–3 agg.) | Chindia Târgoviște | Mioveni, Romania |
| 18:00 EEST (UTC+3) | Hergheligiu 7' | | Ivančić 45+1' | Stadium: Orășenesc; Attendance: 0 Referee: Marius Avram (Bucharest) |

== Season statistics ==
Regular season and promotion play-off overall statistics.

=== Top scorers ===
| Rank | Player | Club | Goals |
|---|---|---|---|
| 1 | (Romania) Albert Voinea | Ripensia Timișoara / Turris-Oltul | 15 |
| 2 | (Romania) Valentin Buhăcianu | UTA Arad | 14 |
| 3 | (Romania) Ciprian Rus | UTA Arad | 13 |
| 4 | (Romania) Andrei Blejdea | Argeș Pitești | 12 |
| 5 | (Romania) Ovidiu Herea | Metaloglobus București | 11 |
| 5 | (Romania) Sergiu Arnăutu | Petrolul Ploiești | 11 |
| 7 | (Romania) Valentin Alexandru | SCM Gloria Buzău / Rapid București | 10 |
| 8 | (Romania) Valentin Munteanu | SCM Gloria Buzău | 9 |
| 8 | (Romania) Bogdan Rusu | Dunărea Călărași | 9 |
| 8 | (Romania) Silviu Pană | Turris Turnu Măgurele | 9 |
| 11 | (Romania) Mircea Axente | ASU Politehnica Timișoara | 8 |
| 11 | (Romania) Cătălin Hlistei | Rapid București | 8 |

=== Clean sheets ===
| Rank | Player | Club | Clean sheets |
|---|---|---|---|
| 1 | (Romania) Vlad Muțiu | Farul Constanța | 10 |
| 1 | (Romania) Flavius Croitoru | Mioveni | 10 |
| 1 | (Romania) Florin Iacob | UTA Arad | 10 |
| 4 | (Romania) Raul Avram | Petrolul Ploiești | 8 |
| 5 | (Romania) Rareș Murariu | ASU Politehnica Timișoara | 7 |
| 6 | (Romania) David Duțu | Turris Turnu Măgurele | 6 |
| 7 | (Romania) Dragoș Balauru | SCM Gloria Buzău | 5 |
| 7 | (Romania) Alexandru Tătaru | Rapid București | 5 |
| 7 | (Romania) Răzvan Ducan | Argeș Pitești | 5 |
| 8 | (Romania) Ionuț Rus | Turris Turnu Măgurele | 4 |
| 8 | (Romania) George Gavrilaș | Metaloglobus București | 4 |
| 8 | (Romania) Alexandru Greab | Concordia Chiajna | 4 |

^{*}Only goalkeepers who played all 90 minutes of a match are taken into consideration.

=== Attendances ===
| Pos | Team | Total | High | Low | Average | Change |
|---|---|---|---|---|---|---|
| 1 | Rapid București | 55,200 | 9,000 | 1,700 | 5,018 | n/a^{2} |
| 2 | Petrolul Ploiești | 32,500 | 6,000 | 1,000 | 3,250 | −15.4% |
| 3 | CSM Reșița | 29,600 | 8,500 | 700 | 2,960 | n/a^{2} |
| 4 | UTA Arad | 23,600 | 4,000 | 1,500 | 2,622 | +132.9% |
| 5 | Argeș Pitești | 28,350 | 8,000 | 300 | 2,577 | +102.0% |
| 6 | SCM Gloria Buzău | 20,000 | 5,000 | 300 | 1,818 | n/a^{2} |
| 7 | Universitatea Cluj | 10,829 | 3,000 | 1,000 | 1,805 | −49.3%^{1} |
| 8 | Turris Turnu Măgurele | 15,300 | 2,000 | 200 | 1,391 | n/a^{2} |
| 9 | Mioveni | 11,400 | 4,000 | 200 | 1,267 | +61.6% |
| 10 | Pandurii Târgu Jiu | 9,700 | 7,000 | 200 | 1,213 | +104.9% |
| 11 | ASU Politehnica Timișoara | 13,000 | 7,000 | 300 | 1,182 | −7.0% |
| 12 | Miercurea Ciuc | 9,600 | 2,000 | 500 | 1,067 | n/a^{2} |
| 13 | Farul Constanța | 9,500 | 2,000 | 300 | 1,056 | +22.6% |
| 14 | Metaloglobus București | 6,600 | 2,500 | 200 | 660 | +114.3% |
| 15 | Ripensia Timișoara | 5,000 | 2,000 | 200 | 556 | +84.1% |
| 16 | Dunărea Călărași | 4,400 | 1,000 | 200 | 550 | −81.8% |
| 17 | Daco-Getica București | 2,300 | 600 | 200 | 383 | −0.3% |
| 18 | Concordia Chiajna | 3,400 | 800 | 100 | 340 | −45.2% |
| 19 | Sportul Snagov | 1,950 | 1,000 | 50 | 244 | −14.1% |
| 20 | Viitorul Târgu Jiu | 2,335 | 1,000 | 40 | 212 | −18.1% |
| | League total | 294,564 | 9,000 | 40 | 1,508 | +56.3% |

Updated to games played on 8 March 2020
Source: League attendance: Liga II 2019/2020
Notes:
1: Universitatea Cluj had the home ground suspended for 2 rounds.
2: SCM Gloria Buzău, Rapid București, Turris Turnu Măgurele, CSM Reșița and Miercurea Ciuc played last season in the Liga III.
