= Sota Mino =

Japanese footballer (born 1994)

Personal information
- Full name: Sota Mino
- Date of birth: 20 October 1994 (age 32)
- Place of birth: Ōtsu, Japan
- Height: 1.81 m (5 ft 11 in)
- Position: Midfielder

Team information
- Current team: UTA Arad
- Number: 5

Youth career
- 2001–2009: Azul Shiga
- 2010–2013: Sakuyo High School

Senior career*
Years	Team	Apps	(Gls)
2013–2016	Lagend Shiga	55	(4)
2016	Fgura United	4	(0)
2017–2018	Għargħur	14	(0)
2018–2021	Metaloglobus București	68	(0)
2021–2024	Hermannstadt	100	(2)
2024–2025	Sepsi OSK	35	(0)
2025–	UTA Arad	40	(1)
- * Club domestic league appearances and goals as of 6 November 2026

Sota Mino (Japanese: 三野 草太, Mino Sota; born 20 October 1994) is a Japanese professional footballer who plays as a midfielder for Liga I club UTA Arad.

== Club career ==
Mino started his career at Lagend Shiga in Japan, then moved to Malta, where he played for Fgura United and Għargħur. In the summer of 2018, he signed with Romanian Liga II side Metaloglobus București, where he played for three years before joining FC Hermannstadt and making his Liga I debut.

Mino joined Hermannstadt in July 2021. Mino extended his contract with Hermannstadt for another 2 years in October 2022.

== Career statistics ==
=== Club ===
As of match played 6 November 2026

Appearances and goals by club, season and competition
Club	Season	League			National cup (Note: Includes Maltese FA Trophy, Cupa României)		Europe		Other		Total	
Club	Season	Division	Apps	Goals	Apps	Goals	Apps	Goals	Apps	Goals	Apps	Goals
Lagend Shiga	2013	Kansai Soccer League (Div. 1)	?	?	?	?	—		—		?	?
Lagend Shiga	2014	Kansai Soccer League (Div. 1)	?	?	?	?	—		—		?	?
Lagend Shiga	2015	Kansai Soccer League (Div. 1)	?	?	?	?	—		—		?	?
Lagend Shiga	Total		55	4	?	?	—		—		55	4
Fgura United	2016–17	Maltese First Division	4	0	1	0	—		—		5	0
Għargħur	2016–17	Maltese First Division	14	0	—		—		—		14	0
Għargħur	2018–19	Maltese Second Division	?	?	0	0	—		—		?	?
Għargħur	Total		14	0	0	0	—		—		14	0
Metaloglobus București	2018–19	Liga II	23	0	—		—		—		23	0
Metaloglobus București	2019–20	Liga II	21	0	0	0	—		—		21	0
Metaloglobus București	2020–21	Liga II	24	0	1	0	—		—		25	0
Metaloglobus București	Total		68	0	0	0	—		—		68	0
Hermannstadt	2021–22	Liga II	29	0	2	0	—		—		31	0
Hermannstadt	2022–23	Liga I	36	0	5	0	—		—		41	0
Hermannstadt	2023–24	Liga I	35	2	4	0	—		—		39	2
Hermannstadt	Total		100	2	11	0	—		—		111	2
Sepsi OSK	2024–25	Liga I	35	0	0	0	—		—		35	0
UTA Arad	2025–26	Liga I	25	0	3	0	—		—		28	0
UTA Arad	2026–27	Liga I	15	1	1	0	—		—		16	1
UTA Arad	Total		40	1	4	0	—		—		44	1
Career total			261	7	17	0	—		—		278	7
