= Laszlo Balint =

Laszlo Balint may refer to:

- László Bálint (born 1948), Hungarian football player
- László Balint (born 1979), Romanian football player
