= Florin Iacob =

Romanian footballer

Personal information
- Date of birth: 16 August 1993 (age 33)
- Place of birth: Brașov, Romania
- Height: 1.80 m (5 ft 11 in)
- Position: Goalkeeper

Team information
- Current team: ASA Târgu Mureș
- Number: 93

Youth career
- 2000–2010: FC Brașov

Senior career*
Years	Team	Apps	(Gls)
2010–2017	FC Brașov	80	(0)
2012–2014	→ Unirea Tărlungeni (loan)	31	(0)
2015–2016	→ Concordia Chiajna (loan)	6	(0)
2017	ASA Târgu Mureș	6	(0)
2018	Sportul Snagov	31	(0)
2019	Metaloglobus București	14	(0)
2019–2024	UTA Arad	141	(0)
2024	Corvinul Hunedoara	0	(0)
2025	SR Brașov		
2025–	ASA Târgu Mureș	21	(0)
- * Club domestic league appearances and goals as of 25 October 2026

Florin Iacob (born 16 August 1993) is a Romanian professional footballer who plays as a goalkeeper for Liga II club ASA Târgu Mureș, which he captains.

== International career ==
Iacob was called up for the first time to the Romania senior squad for the World Cup qualifiers against North Macedonia and Germany in March 2021.

== Honours ==
Unirea Tărlungeni

- Liga III: 2012–13

Concordia Chiajna

- Cupa Ligii runner-up: 2015–16

UTA Arad

- Liga II: 2019–20

Individual

- Liga I Most cleansheet: 2021–22
