= Jordan Gutiérrez =

Equatoguinean footballer (born 1998)

Personal information
- Full name: Jordan Gutiérrez Nsang
- Date of birth: 8 July 1998 (age 28)
- Place of birth: Barcelona, Spain
- Height: 1.69 m (5 ft 7 in)
- Position: Winger

Team information
- Current team: Metaloglobus București
- Number: 7

Youth career
- –2013: Damm
- 2013–2017: Espanyol

Senior career*
Years	Team	Apps	(Gls)
2017–2019	Espanyol B	15	(0)
2018	→ Alcorcón B (loan)	1	(0)
2018–2019	→ Horta (loan)	24	(2)
2019–2020	Peña Deportiva	10	(0)
2020–2021	Leganés B	19	(2)
2021–2022	Granollers	8	(0)
2022	Manchego Ciudad Real	10	(1)
2022–2023	Prat	8	(0)
2023–2024	UE Santa Coloma	21	(2)
2024	Atlètic d'Escaldes	14	(4)
2024–2025	Septemvri Sofia	11	(1)
2025–2026	Rudar Prijedor	20	(1)
2026–	Metaloglobus București	10	(0)

International career^{‡}
2016	Spain U19	3	(0)
2016	Spain U20	6	(2)
2018	Equatorial Guinea U23	1	(0)
2017–	Equatorial Guinea	16	(0)
- * Club domestic league appearances and goals as of 31 October 2026 ‡ National team caps and goals as of 31 March 2026

Jordan Gutiérrez Nsang (born 8 July 1998) is a professional footballer who plays as a winger for Liga II club Metaloglobus București. Born in Spain, he plays for the Equatorial Guinea national team.

== Professional career ==
Born in Barcelona, Catalonia, Gutiérrez is a youth product of RCD Espanyol, and in July 2017 signed his first contract with RCD Espanyol B until 2020. He made his senior debut with the reserves during the 2016–17 season, suffering relegation from Segunda División B.

On 16 September 2020, after two loan stints at Tercera División sides AD Alcorcón B and UA Horta, and a one-year spell at SCR Peña Deportiva in the third division, Gutiérrez joined CD Leganés and was assigned to the B-team in the fourth tier.

On 10 September 2025, Gutiérrez joined Premier League of Bosnia and Herzegovina club Rudar Prijedor.

== International career ==
Gutiérrez was born in Spain to a Spanish (Canarians) father and a Spanish-born mother, Sonia Nsang Silebó, who has Equatoguinean parents from the Fang and Bubi ethnics. Gutiérrez is a former youth international for Spain. He was called up to the senior Equatorial Guinea national football team in August 2017. Gutiérrez made his debut for Equatorial Guinea in a 2–1 friendly loss to Benin on 3 September 2017. The match was eliminated from FIFA records, as the referee and his assistants referees were from Equatorial Guinea. From 17 November 2018, Gutiérrez is cap-tied to Equatorial Guinea as he played for them in a competitive match against Senegal.

== Career statistics ==
=== International ===
As of match played 31 March 2026

Appearances and goals by national team and year
National team	Year	Apps	Goals
Equatorial Guinea	2017	2	0
Equatorial Guinea	2018	1	0
Equatorial Guinea	2019	3	0
Equatorial Guinea	2020	1	0
Equatorial Guinea	2021	2	0
Equatorial Guinea	2022	1	0
Equatorial Guinea	2023	0	0
Equatorial Guinea	2024	4	0
Equatorial Guinea	2025	0	0
Equatorial Guinea	2026	2	0
Total		16	0

== Honours ==
Espanyol B

- Tercera División: 2017–18

Leganés B

- Tercera División: 2020–21
