= Gigel Coman =

Romanian footballer

Personal information
- Date of birth: 4 October 1978 (age 48)
- Place of birth: Bucharest, Romania
- Height: 1.73 m (5 ft 8 in)
- Position: Winger

Team information
- Current team: Metaloglobus București (sporting director)

Youth career
- –1996: Național București

Senior career*
Years	Team	Apps	(Gls)
1996–2004	Naţional București	159	(21)
2005–2006	Politehnica Timișoara	36	(9)
2006–2007	Steaua București	16	(0)
2007–2008	Universitatea Cluj	25	(0)
2008–2011	Otopeni	56	(3)
2012–2013	Juniorul București	33	(4)
2014–2016	Progresul Spartac	78	(12)
2016–2019	Metaloglobus București	44	(0)
2020	Metaloglobus București	0	(0)
Total		447	(49)

International career
2003–2005	Romania	3	(0)

Managerial career
- 2017–2020: Metaloglobus București (player/assistant)
- 2018: Metaloglobus București (caretaker)
- 2020–2023: Metaloglobus București (assistant)
- 2023–: Metaloglobus București (sporting director)
- * Club domestic league appearances and goals

Gigel Coman (born 4 October 1978) is a Romanian former professional footballer who played as a winger, currently sporting director at Liga II club Metaloglobus București.

== Club career ==
Coman made his professional debut at FC Naţional București in 1996, before moving to FCU Politehnica Timişoara in the winter break of the 2004–05 season.

In the summer of 2006, at the request of Cosmin Olăroiu – Steaua București's head coach – Coman is signed by Steaua București.

== Career statistics ==
=== International ===
Appearances and goals by national team and year
National team	Year	Apps	Goals
Romania	2003	1	0
Romania	2004	0	0
Romania	2005	2	0
Total		3	0

== Honours ==
National București

- Cupa României runner-up: 1996–97, 2002–03

Metaloglobus București

- Liga III: 2016–17
