= Robert Neacșu =

Romanian footballer (born 2000)

Personal information
- Full name: Robert Cornel Neacșu
- Date of birth: 25 January 2000 (age 26)
- Place of birth: Urziceni, Romania
- Height: 1.67 m (5 ft 6 in)
- Positions: Left-back; midfielder

Team information
- Current team: Metaloglobus București
- Number: 22

Youth career
- Juventus Borănești
- –2017: Juventus București

Senior career*
Years	Team	Apps	(Gls)
2017–2019	Daco-Getica București	37	(1)
2019–2020	Turris Turnu Măgurele	10	(0)
2021–2022	CSA Steaua București	18	(2)
2022–	Metaloglobus București	84	(1)
- * Club domestic league appearances and goals as of 31 October 2026

Robert Cornel Neacșu (born 30 January 2000) is a Romanian professional footballer who plays as a left-back or a midfielder for Liga II club Metaloglobus București.

== Honours ==
CSA Steaua București

- Liga III: 2020–21
