= Christ Kouadio =

Ivorian footballer

Personal information
- Full name: Christ Sarkodjé Manca Kouadio
- Date of birth: 23 December 2000 (age 25)
- Place of birth: Abidjan, Ivory Coast
- Height: 1.70 m (5 ft 7 in)
- Position: Right back

Team information
- Current team: Radnik Surdulica
- Number: 33

Youth career
- Lanusei
- 2017–2019: Cagliari
- 2019–2020: Torino

Senior career*
Years	Team	Apps	(Gls)
2021	Savoia	21	(0)
2021–2022	KPV	17	(0)
2022–2024	Politehnica Iași	20	(0)
2023–2024	→ Metaloglobus București (loan)	22	(1)
2024–2026	Metaloglobus București	46	(2)
2026–	Radnik Surdulica	8	(0)
- * Club domestic league appearances and goals as of 12 June 2026

Christ Sarkodjé Manca Kouadio (born 23 December 2000) is an Ivorian professional footballer who plays as a right back for Serbian SuperLiga club Radnik Surdulica.

== Club career ==
Kouadio made his debut for Politehnica Iași on 7 July 2022, in a 0–2 Liga I loss to CFR Cluj.

== Honours ==
Politehnica Iași

- Liga II: 2022–23
