= Radu Chiriac =

Romanian professional footballer

Personal information
- Full name: Radu Ioan Chiriac
- Date of birth: 4 January 2000 (age 26)
- Place of birth: Iași, Romania
- Height: 1.80 m (5 ft 11 in)
- Position: Midfielder

Team information
- Current team: Metaloglobus București (on loan from Astra Giurgiu)
- Number: 28

Youth career
- 2010–2017: Școala de Fotbal Dănuț Coman
- 2015–2016: → Atletic Bradu (loan)
- 2016–2017: → Argeș Pitești (loan)

Senior career*
Years	Team	Apps	(Gls)
2017–2019	Astra II Giurgiu	28	(8)
2017–	Astra Giurgiu	2	(0)
2019–2021	→ Metaloglobus București (loan)	23	(1)

International career^{‡}
2016	Romania U-16	3	(0)
2016–2017	Romania U-17	4	(0)
2017–2018	Romania U-18	5	(0)
2018–2019	Romania U-19	7	(0)
- * Club domestic league appearances and goals as of 8 May 2021 ‡ National team caps and goals as of 26 March 2019

Radu Ioan Chiriac (born 4 January 2000) is a Romanian professional footballer who plays as a midfielder for Astra Giurgiu.

== Honours ==
Astra Giurgiu

- Cupa României: Runner-up 2018–19
