= Andrei Lungu =

Romanian footballer (born 1989)

Personal information
- Date of birth: 29 January 1989 (age 37)
- Place of birth: Pitești, Romania
- Height: 1.89 m (6 ft 2 in)
- Position: Midfielder

Youth career
- 2004–2007: Ardealul Cluj-Napoca

Senior career*
| Years | Team | Apps | (Gls) |
| 2007–2013 | Sportul Studențesc | 103 | (6) |
| 2013–2015 | Universitatea Cluj | 40 | (1) |
| 2015 | Hapoel Petah Tikva | 12 | (0) |
| 2016 | Energie Cottbus | 7 | (0) |
| 2016 | Voluntari | 10 | (0) |
| 2017 | Hapoel Ramat HaSharon | 18 | (2) |
| 2017 | Juventus București | 4 | (0) |
| 2018 | Hapoel Ramat HaSharon | 9 | (0) |
| 2018–2019 | Chindia Târgoviște | 17 | (1) |
| 2019–2021 | Metaloglobus București | 46 | (3) |
| 2021 | Hermannstadt | 8 | (0) |
| Total | | 274 | (13) |

Managerial career
- 2022–2023: Dunărea Giurgiu (assistant)
- * Club domestic league appearances and goals as of 22:04, 13 January 2024 (UTC)

Andrei Lungu (born 29 January 1989) is a Romanian footballer who played as a midfielder for teams such as Sportul Studențesc, Universitatea Cluj, Hapoel Ramat HaSharon or Metaloglobus București, among others.
