= FC Metaloglobus București =

Metaloglobus București
- Full name: Fotbal Club Metaloglobus București SA
- Nicknames: Metalo; Echipa Pantelimonului (Pantelimon's team)
- Short name: Metaloglobus
- Founded: 1936; 90 years ago (Note: Despite having 1923 on the club crest, this date refers to the foundation date of the Metaloglobus factories.)
- Ground: Metaloglobus / Clinceni
- Capacity: 1,000 / 4,500
- Owner: Imad Kassas
- Chairman: Marius Burcă
- Head coach: Ianis Zicu
- League: Liga II
- 2025–26: Liga I, 16th of 16 (relegated)
- Website: metaloglobusfc.ro
Home colours	Away colours

Fotbal Club Metaloglobus București, commonly known as Metaloglobus București or simply as Metaloglobus, is a Romanian professional football club based in Bucharest, that competes in Liga II, the second tier of Romanian football.

== History ==
Metaloglobus București was founded in 1936 as the football team of the Metaloglobus factory, a powerful factory that was founded in 1923 by the Austrian industrialist Manfréd Weiss. In the club's first season, Metaloglobus entered the Bucharest District Championship, joining the Category II division. At the end of the 1936–37 season, Metaloglobus achieved promotion to the Category I, following a 2–1 play-off win against Colentina București.

The factory was further developed in the communist period and produced all kinds of objects made of steel and iron, from lanterns, bullets, boilers and from 1965 toys. After the 1989 Romanian Revolution, the factory began to undergo financial difficulties and in 1999 was bought by Syrian businessman Imad Kassas.

Metaloglobus competed in the amateur leagues of Bucharest throughout its existence, and by 2008 the club had been reduced to youth teams only, with the under-19 side winning the Bucharest Municipal Championship that year, laying the foundations for the club’s revival at senior level.

In the 2010–11 season, they won the Liga IV Bucharest and qualified for the promotion play-off, where they were defeated 1–2 by Rapid Clejani, the champions of Giurgiu County. However, after many teams withdrew that summer, Metaloglobus was invited to join Liga III.

In their first season in Liga III, Metaloglobus played at Clinceni Arena’s second ground and ranked 9th in Series IV under Octavian Ștefan and Adrian Matei, who took over in April 2012.

Over the next four consecutive seasons, the team consistently finished in the top half, achieving 3rd place in Series II in the 2012–13 season under Matei and Leonard Strizu from the second half, and 4th place in Series III in 2013–14.

In the 2014–15 season, the team was moved again to Series II, and following a modest run of results, Leonard Strizu was replaced at the end of the first half by Sorin Colceag, who led the team to a 5th-place finish and then to another 3rd-place finish in the 2015–16 season.

In 2016, Bogdan Vintilă was appointed head coach and led the team to 1st place in Series III, securing promotion to Liga II with five rounds to spare in the 2016–17 season, ending 11 points ahead of 2nd-placed Viitorul Domnești.

Their first season in the second tier was a difficult one under Vintilă, who also led Metaloglobus to the Round of 32 in the Cupa României, where they lost 1–2 to Gaz Metan Mediaș. He was replaced during the winter break by Alin Chița, as the team were unable to avoid the relegation zone, finishing 16th, but they were spared from relegation following the withdrawal of 5th-placed Afumați.

The 2018–19 season began with Bogdan Andone as head coach, but he left in October after ten rounds. After a brief interim under assistant Gigel Coman, Cristian Popovici took over, earning only four points in seven matches, far below expectations, and parted ways by mutual agreement. He was succeeded by László Balint, who guided Metaloglobus to a 9th-place finish.

In June 2019, Marius Măldărășanu was appointed as head coach, leading the Bucharest-based side from the Pantelimon neighbourhood to the Round of 32 of the Cupa României, where they faced FCSB and were defeated 0–2, with Gavrilaș, Ciubotaru, Plămadă, Lung, Sava, Ghenovici, Al. Coman, Chiriac, Ciocâlteu, Ov. Herea and Cl. Herea in the starting lineup. While the team was in 7th place in the 2019–20 Liga II campaign at the time the season was suspended in March 2020 due to the COVID-19 pandemic.

During the 2020–21 season, following the departure of Măldărășanu, Gabriel Manu was appointed as head coach and led Metaloglobus to a 10th-place finish in the regular season and 3rd place in Group A of the play-out stage. In the Cupa României, the Bucharest side was eliminated in the fourth round after a 1–2 defeat, after extra time, against Petrolul Ploiești. The squad comprised Gavrilaș, Nedelcovici, Ciubotaru, Putaru, Sava, Caramalău, Șandru, Gafaru, Mino, Kassabji, Matache, Cazan, Chiriac, Lungu, Ciocâlteu, Vraciu, Ov. Herea, Cl. Herea, Gavîrliță, and Florescu.

Gabriel Manu left the club at the end of his contract and was replaced by Nicolae Grigore for the 2021–22 season. Metaloglobus finished 10th in the regular season and 2nd in Group A of the play-out stage. In the Cupa României, they were eliminated in the third round by Tunari, losing 0–1 at Concordia Stadium in Chiajna.

Ahead of the 2022–23 season, Grigore was replaced by Eugen Trică, whose spell ended after six rounds. After two matches led by fitness coach Florin Drăghici, Eusebiu Tudor took charge and guided the team to a 15th-place finish in the regular season and 5th in Group A of the play-out stage, avoiding relegation by defeating Progresul Spartac București 5–3 on penalties in the relegation play-off, following draws of 1–1 at Clinceni Stadium and 0–0 at CNAF Stadium in Buftea.

Eusebiu Tudor resigned after Metaloglobus lost 1–2 after extra time to Dinamo in the play-off round of the Cupa României and following four rounds of the 2023–24 Liga II campaign. Ianis Zicu was appointed as the new head coach and led the team to an 11th-place finish in the regular season and 3rd in the play-out stage.

In the 2024–25 season, Metaloglobus finished 3rd after the regular season and 5th in the play-off stage of Liga II, qualifying for the promotion/relegation play-off, as 2nd-placed Steaua București was ineligible for promotion, and on 1 June 2025, Metaloglobus was promoted to Liga I for the first time in its history after beating Politehnica Iași, with Dragoș Huiban scoring late goals in both matches, first in the 86th minute of the 1–1 draw at Emil Alexandrescu Stadium and then in the 85th minute of the 1–0 win at Clinceni Stadium. The squad coached by Zicu included Gavrilaș, Nedelcovici, Kouadio, Issah, Sousa, Honciu, Caramalău, Sava, Cazan, Zakir, Dumitru, Višić, A. Irimia, D. Irimia, Liș, J. Morais, Sîrbu, Huiban, Gheorghe, Nicolae, Neacșu and Milea.

Zicu left the club after being signed by Farul Constanța shortly after promotion, while Metaloglobus appointed Mihai Teja as the new head coach for the 2025–26 season, who brought in several new players, including Abbey, Aboubacar Camara, Ely Fernandes, Ubbink, Bruno Carvalho, and Sabater, despite a limited budget. Under Teja, the team reached the group stage of the Cupa României, and the squad was further strengthened during the season with additional signings such as Cestor, Purece, Țîrlea, and Daniel Popa. However, following poor results, Teja resigned one round before the end of the regular season, with the team bottom of the table. He was replaced by Florin Bratu, but Metaloglobus was mathematically relegated three rounds before the end of the campaign, ultimately finishing 16th in the league.

== Stadium ==
The club plays its home games on the Stadionul Metaloglobus from the Bucharest neighborhood of Pantelimon.

The stadium was under renovations between 2011 and 2015; during this period the team played its home matches on Stadionul Clinceni and on Stadionul CNAF.

== Honours ==
Former logo.

Liga III

- Winners (1): 2016–17

Liga IV – Bucharest

- Winners (1): 2010–11

== Players ==
=== First-team squad ===
As of 1 October 2026

Note: Flags indicate national team as defined under FIFA eligibility rules; some limited exceptions apply. Players may hold more than one non-FIFA nationality.

No.	Pos.	Nation	Player
1	GK	ROU	George Gavrilaș (3rd captain)
2	DF	MDA	Dinis Ieșeanu
4	DF	ROU	George Caramalău
5	DF	ROU	Tudor Pojar
7	FW	GEQ	Jordan Gutiérrez
8	MF	ROU	Andrei Pandele
9	FW	ROU	Nicolas Constantinescu (on loan from Farul Constanța)
10	MF	ROU	Florin Purece (vice-captain)
11	MF	ROU	Alexandru Irimia (on loan from Dinamo București)
12	DF	BRA	Júnior Morais (Captain)
13	DF	ROU	Andrei Sava (4th captain)
16	MF	ROU	Andrei Dumitru
17	FW	NGR	Ime Ndon

No.	Pos.	Nation	Player
18	MF	ROU	Luca Stoica (on loan from Rapid București)
19	FW	ROU	Ștefan Todoran (on loan from Voluntari)
20	DF	ROU	Laurențiu Corbu
21	DF	ROU	Marius Martac
22	MF	ROU	Robert Neacșu
23	DF	ROU	Costin Leonte
30	DF	CRO	Matko Zirdum
33	GK	ROU	Alexandru Soare
34	GK	ROU	Ionuț Ailenei
75	DF	BRA	Erico
77	MF	ROU	Vlăduț Tiță
78	MF	ROU	Vlad Stancovici
—	MF	ARG	Jonathan Rodríguez

=== Dual registration ===
Note: Flags indicate national team as defined under FIFA eligibility rules; some limited exceptions apply. Players may hold more than one non-FIFA nationality.

No.	Pos.	Nation	Player
6	MF	ROU	Luca Banu (from Farul Constanța)
14	MF	ROU	Andrei Oancea (from Farul Constanța)
—	GK	ROU	David Barbu (from Farul Constanța)

No.	Pos.	Nation	Player
—	MF	ROU	Alexandru Telehoi (from Farul Constanța)
—	MF	ROU	Ianis Podoleanu (from Farul Constanța)

=== Out on loan ===
Note: Flags indicate national team as defined under FIFA eligibility rules; some limited exceptions apply. Players may hold more than one non-FIFA nationality.

No.	Pos.	Nation	Player
—	DF	ROU	Robert Cătălin (at Agricola Borcea until 30 June 2027)
—	FW	ROU	Raoul Banu (at Axi Arena until 30 June 2027)

No.	Pos.	Nation	Player
—	FW	ROU	Alexandru Camerzan (at Gloria Băneasa until 30 June 2027)

== Club officials ==
=== Board of directors ===
Role	Name
Owner	(Syria) Imad Kassas
President	(Romania) Marius Burcă
Sporting director	(Romania) Gigel Coman
Delegate	(Romania) Lucian Cazan
Team Manager	(Romania) Mihai Nedelcu

=== Current technical staff ===
Role	Name
Head coach	(Romania) Ianis Zicu
Assistant coach	(Romania) Daniel Florea
Goalkeeping coach	(Moldova) Mihail Moraru
Fitness coach	(Romania) Florin Drăghici
Club doctor	(Romania) Anamaria Droască
Masseurs	(Romania) Constantin Righel (Romania) Marin Obretin
Kit man	(Romania) Alexandru Greblea

== Notable former players ==
The footballers enlisted below have had international cap(s) for their respective countries at junior and/or senior level and/or significant caps for FC Metaloglobus București players.

Romania

- (Romania) Lucian Cazan
- (Romania) Alexandru Ciocâlteu
- (Romania) Alexandru Coman
- (Romania) Gigel Coman
- (Romania) Valentin Ghenovici
- (Romania) Lucian Goge
- (Romania) Claudiu Herea
- (Romania) Ovidiu Herea
- (Romania) Georgian Honciu
- (Romania) Dragoș Huiban
- (Romania) Alexandru Iacob
- (Romania) Florin Iacob
- (Romania) Andrei Ionescu
- (Romania) David Irimia
- (Romania) Laurențiu Liș
- (Romania) Daniel Lung
- (Romania) Andrei Lungu
- (Romania) Cristian Nedelcovici
- (Romania) Ștefan Niculae
- (Romania) Daniel Popa
- (Romania) Alexandru Potocea
- (Romania) Iulian Roșu
- (Romania) Andrei Sin
- (Romania) Marius Tomozei

DR Congo

- (Democratic Republic of the Congo) Mike Cestor

Ivory Coast

- (Ivory Coast) Christ Kouadio

Japan

- (Japan) Sota Mino

Netherlands

- (Netherlands) Desley Ubbink
- (Netherlands) Yassine Zakir

Serbia

- (Serbia) Stefan Višić

== Former managers ==
- (Romania) Francisc Fabian (1958–1962)
- (Romania) Colea Vâlcov (1964–1965)
- (Romania) Marius Burcă (2008–2011)
- (Romania) Octavian Ștefan (2011–2012)
- (Romania) Adrian Matei (2012–2013))
- (Romania) Leonard Strizu (2013–2014)
- (Romania) Sorin Colceag (2015–2016)
- (Romania) Bogdan Vintilă (2016–2017)
- (Romania) Alin Chița (2018)
- (Romania) Bogdan Andone (2018)
- (Romania) Gigel Coman (2018) (caretaker)
- (Romania) Cristian Popovici (2018)
- (Romania) László Balint (2019)
- (Romania) Marius Măldărășanu (2019–2020)
- (Romania) Gabriel Manu (2020–2021)
- (Romania) Nicolae Grigore (2021–2022)
- (Romania) Eugen Trică (2022)
- (Romania) Eusebiu Tudor (2022–2023)
- (Romania) Ianis Zicu (2023–2025)
- (Romania) Mihai Teja (2025–2026)
- (Romania) Florin Bratu (2026)

== League and cup history ==
Season	Tier	Division	Place	Notes	Cupa României
2025–26	1	Liga I	16th	Relegated	Group stage
2024–25	2	Liga II	5th	Promoted	Third round
2023–24	2	Liga II	11th		Play-off round
2022–23	2	Liga II	15th	Play-out winner	Third round
2021–22	2	Liga II	10th		Third round
2020–21	2	Liga II	10th		Fourth round
2019–20	2	Liga II	7th		Round of 32
2018–19	2	Liga II	9th		Fourth round
2017–18	2	Liga II	16th		Round of 32
2016–17	3	Liga III (Seria II)	1st (C)	Promoted	Second round
2015–16	3	Liga III (Seria II)	3rd		Fifth round
2014–15	3	Liga III (Seria II)	5th		Second round
2013–14	3	Liga III (Seria III)	4th		Third round
2012–13	3	Liga III (Seria II)	3rd		Fourth round
2011–12	3	Liga III (Seria IV)	9th		
2010–11	4	Liga IV (B) (Seria I)	1st (C)	Promoted	
