= Andrei Sava =

Romanian footballer

Personal information
- Date of birth: 7 May 1991 (age 35)
- Place of birth: Bucharest, Romania
- Height: 1.85 m (6 ft 1 in)
- Position: Defender

Team information
- Current team: Metaloglobus București
- Number: 13

Youth career
- Progresul București

Senior career*
Years	Team	Apps	(Gls)
2008	Progresul București	12	(0)
2009	Știința Bacău	5	(0)
2009–2010	Otopeni	21	(0)
2010–2011	Politehnica Timișoara	3	(0)
2011	→ ACU Arad (loan)	11	(1)
2012	Juventus București	2	(0)
2012–2013	Progresul Cernica		
2014–2015	Viitorul Axintele		
2015–2016	Viitorul Constanța	1	(0)
2016–	Metaloglobus București	227	(0)

International career
2007–2008	Romania U17	5	(0)
2009–2010	Romania U19	6	(0)
- * Club domestic league appearances and goals as of 31 October 2026

Andrei Sava (born 7 May 1991) is a Romanian professional footballer who plays as a defender for Liga II club Metaloglobus București.

== International career ==
Andrei Sava played in 6 matches for Romania U-19.

== Honours ==
Metaloglobus București

- Liga III: 2016–17
