= Dragoș Huiban =

Romanian footballer

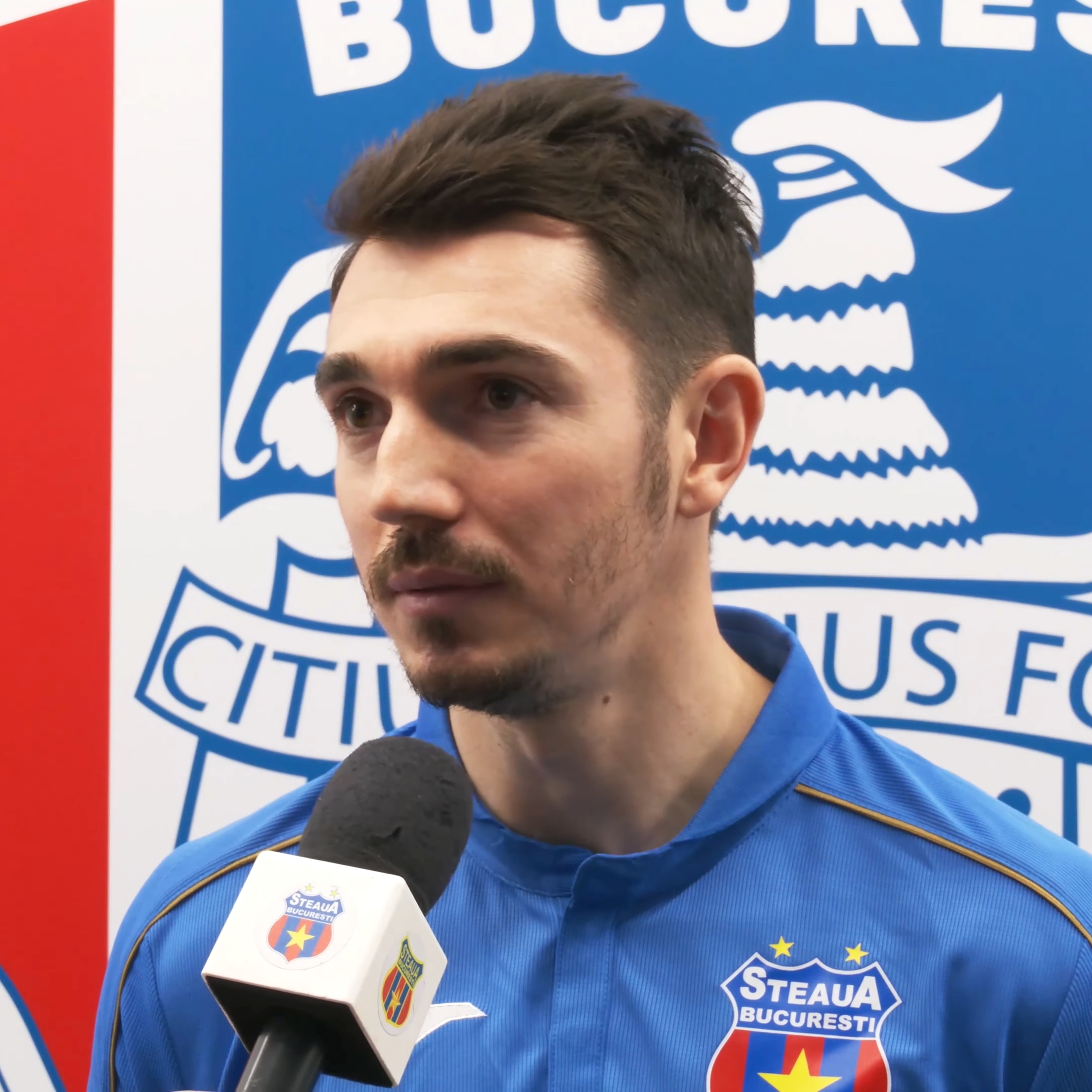
- Dragoș Huiban in 2021

Personal information
- Full name: Dragoș Ionuț Huiban
- Date of birth: 29 January 1990 (age 36)
- Place of birth: Bârlad, Romania
- Height: 1.87 m (6 ft 2 in)
- Positions: Midfielder; forward

Team information
- Current team: SCM Râmnicu Vâlcea

Youth career
- –2007: FCM Bacău

Senior career*
Years	Team	Apps	(Gls)
2007–2012	FCM Bacău	62	(6)
2011	→ FCM Onești (loan)		
2012–2014	ASA Târgu Mureș	37	(7)
2015	SC Bacău	0	(0)
2015	Academica Clinceni	7	(0)
2016–2017	Sepsi OSK	43	(5)
2018–2019	Sportul Snagov	48	(11)
2019–2021	Gloria Buzău	27	(6)
2021–2022	CSA Steaua București	31	(5)
2022–2026	Metaloglobus București	118	(35)
2026–	SCM Râmnicu Vâlcea	7	(1)

International career
2008	Romania U19	3	(1)
- * Club domestic league appearances and goals as of 10 September 2026

Dragoș Ionuț Huiban (born 29 January 1990) is a Romanian professional footballer who plays as a midfielder or a forward for Liga II club SCM Râmnicu Vâlcea.

== Career ==
On 1 June 2025, Huiban scored the winning goal against Poli Iasi to help Metaloglobus get promoted to the Superliga for the first time in the Liga II promotion playoffs.

== Honours ==
CSA Steaua București

- Liga III: 2020–21
