= Laurențiu Liș =

Romanian professional footballer

Personal information
- Full name: Laurențiu Marian Liș
- Date of birth: 8 September 2004 (age 22)
- Place of birth: Bucharest, Romania
- Height: 1.77 m (5 ft 10 in)
- Position: Midfielder

Team information
- Current team: Afumați
- Number: 15

Youth career
- –2021: Prosport Academy

Senior career*
Years	Team	Apps	(Gls)
2021–2022	Academica II Clinceni	2	(1)
2022	Academica Clinceni	2	(0)
2022–2026	Metaloglobus București	59	(1)
2026–	Afumați	8	(2)
- * Club domestic league appearances and goals as of 31 October 2026

Laurențiu Marian Liș (born 8 September 2004) is a Romanian professional footballer who plays as a midfielder for Liga II club Afumați.
