= Lucian Cazan =

Romanian football player

Personal information
- Full name: Cristian Lucian Cazan
- Date of birth: 25 December 1989 (age 36)
- Place of birth: Bucharest, Romania
- Height: 1.75 m (5 ft 9 in)
- Position: Defender

Team information
- Current team: Metaloglobus București (delegate)

Youth career
- –2006: Sportul Studenţesc

Senior career*
Years	Team	Apps	(Gls)
2006–2010	Sportul Studenţesc	96	(0)
2011	FCM Târgu Mureș	2	(0)
2011–2015	Ceahlăul Piatra Neamţ	96	(2)
2016	Gaz Metan Mediaș	12	(0)
2016–2018	Voluntari	28	(1)
2018–2019	Petrolul Ploiești	29	(5)
2019–2025	Metaloglobus București	63	(4)
Total		326	(12)

International career
2006	Romania U17	3	(0)

Managerial career
- 2025–: Metaloglobus București (delegate)
- * Club domestic league appearances and goals

Cristian Lucian Cazan (born 25 December 1989) is a former Romanian professional footballer who played as a defender, currently delegate at Liga II club Metaloglobus București.

== Personal life ==
His father, Paul Cazan, was also a football player and a legend of Sportul Studenţesc.

== Honours ==
Gaz Metan Mediaş

- Liga II: 2015–16

Voluntari

- Cupa României: 2016–17
- Supercupa României: 2017
