= Mircea Voicu =

Romanian footballer

Personal information
- Date of birth: 17 April 1980 (age 46)
- Place of birth: Slatina, Romania
- Height: 1.78 m (5 ft 10 in)
- Position: Midfielder

Team information
- Current team: CSM Slatina (assistant)

Youth career
- Oltul Slatina
- –1999: Universitatea Craiova

Senior career*
Years	Team	Apps	(Gls)
1999–2001	Universitatea Craiova	1	(0)
2000–2001	→ Electro Craiova (loan)	19	(2)
2001–2003	Rarora Râmnicu Vâlcea	?	(?)
2003–2007	Jiul Petroşani	71	(19)
2007	Pandurii Târgu Jiu	11	(0)
2008	Râmnicu Vâlcea	14	(5)
2008–2009	Gaz Metan Mediaş	11	(1)
2010–2012	ALRO Slatina	41	(9)
2012–2015	Olt Slatina	?	(?)
2016–2017	Posada Perişani	?	(?)
2017–2018	Voința Orlești	?	(?)
Total		168	(36)

Managerial career
- 2015–2016: Olt Slatina (assistant)
- 2018–: CSM Slatina (assistant)
- 2020: CSM Slatina (caretaker)
- * Club domestic league appearances and goals as of 18 July 2018

Mircea Voicu (born 17 April 1980) is a Romanian former footballer who played as a midfielder.

== Honours ==
Jiul Petroșani

- Liga II: 2004–05

ALRO Slatina

- Liga III: 2009–10
