= George Gavrilaș =

Romanian footballer (born 1990)

Personal information
- Full name: George Petrișor Gavrilaș
- Date of birth: 15 December 1990 (age 35)
- Place of birth: Sighetu Marmației, Romania
- Height: 1.85 m (6 ft 1 in)
- Position: Goalkeeper

Team information
- Current team: Metaloglobus București
- Number: 1

Youth career
- 1998–2001: CSM Sighetu Marmației
- 2001–2008: Luceafărul Dej

Senior career*
Years	Team	Apps	(Gls)
2009–2010	FC Baia Mare	7	(0)
2010–2012	Astra II Ploiești	18	(0)
2011	→ CF Brăila (loan)	15	(0)
2012–2017	Astra Giurgiu	21	(0)
2017–2018	Voluntari	4	(0)
2018	→ Juventus București (loan)	1	(0)
2018–2019	Daco-Getica București	24	(0)
2019–2023	Metaloglobus București	87	(0)
2023–2024	Petrolul Ploiești	0	(0)
2024–	Metaloglobus București	82	(0)
- * Club domestic league appearances and goals as of 31 October 2026

George Petrișor Gavrilaș (born 15 December 1990) is a Romanian professional footballer who plays as a goalkeeper for Liga II club Metaloglobus București.

== Club career ==
Before being transferred to Astra Ploiești, Gavrilaș was being scouted by AC Milan.

== Honours ==
Astra Giurgiu

- Liga I: 2015–16
- Cupa României: 2013–14
- Supercupa României: 2014, 2016

Voluntari

- Cupa României: 2016–17
- Supercupa României: 2017
