= László Balint =

Romanian footballer and manager

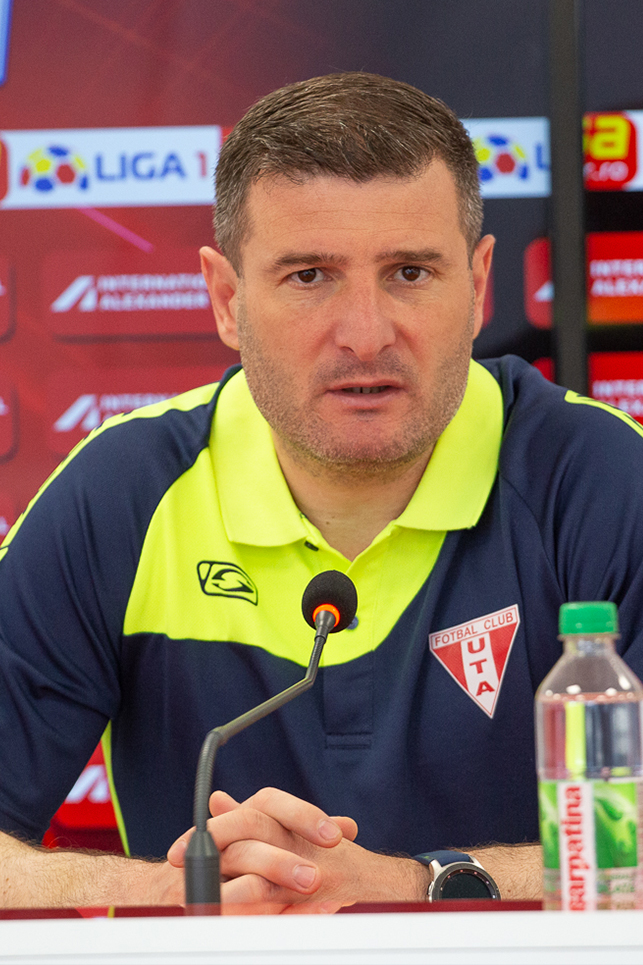

Personal information
- Full name: György László Balint
- Date of birth: 29 March 1979 (age 47)
- Place of birth: Brașov, Romania
- Height: 1.79 m (5 ft 10 in)
- Position: Defender

Youth career
- 1988–1998: FC Brașov

Senior career*
Years	Team	Apps	(Gls)
1998–2000	Rapid Energia Brașov		
2000–2001	Romradiatoare Brașov		
2001–2005	FC Brașov	65	(1)
2005–2006	CFR Cluj	13	(0)
2007	UTA Arad	29	(3)
2007–2009	Unirea Urziceni	19	(1)
2009	Diósgyőr	11	(0)
2010–2011	Unirea Tărlungeni	16	(2)
Total		153	(7)

Managerial career
- 2010–2014: Unirea Tărlungeni
- 2014–2015: FC Brașov (assistant)
- 2015–2016: Academica Clinceni
- 2017: ASA Târgu Mureș
- 2017–2018: FK Csíkszereda
- 2018–2019: Sportul Snagov
- 2019: Metaloglobus București
- 2019–2022: UTA Arad
- 2022: Universitatea Craiova
- 2022–2023: UTA Arad
- 2024: Petrolul Ploiești
- 2025–2026: Oțelul Galați
- * Club domestic league appearances and goals

György László "Gyuszi" Balint (born 29 March 1979) is a Romanian football manager and former player.

== Playing career ==
Balint was born in Brașov, Romania, into an ethnic Hungarian family. In his early career as a footballer, he played for Rapid Energia Braşov, Romradiatoare Braşov, before joining FC Brașov in 2001, where he played for four seasons in Liga I. After the club's relegation, he moved to CFR Cluj, under player-coach Dorinel Munteanu, reaching the 2005 UEFA Intertoto Cup finals with his new club.

The following season, he transferred to another Liga I club, UTA Arad. In 2007, he was brought by Dan Petrescu to Unirea Urziceni, a team that would win its first championship title in history two years later. After that, followed a short spell at Diósgyőr in the Hungarian First Division, before signing as a player-manager for Unirea Tărlungeni in the Romanian Liga III, a club near his hometown of Braşov.

== Coaching career ==
Under his management, Unirea Tărlungeni won its first-ever promotion to Liga II. In January 2015, he joined Liga I side FC Brașov as an assistant coach for the second part of the 2014–15 season, followed by an employment as head coach at Academica Clinceni in Liga II. In June 2017, he was appointed manager of Târgu Mureș after their relegation to the second division, where he spent only 3 months, resigning after six league games with the team sitting 3rd in the table.

Shortly after, he took over the management of Miercurea Ciuc, finishing second at the end of the 2017–18 season of Liga III, the highest ranking in the club's history. In June 2018, he accepted an offer from Sportul Snagov, a team that finished the 2017–18 Liga II season in 10th. Under his command, the team became the biggest surprise of the competition, finishing the first part of the 2018–19 season at the top of the table. Due to the club's financial issues, Balint left the club in January 2019, along with many important players.

In 2019, he took charge of UTA Arad. Under his command, UTA won the 2019–20 Liga II title, marking the club's return to top division after 12 years.

== Managerial statistics ==
As of 14 March 2026

Managerial record by club and tenure
Team	From	To	Record				
Team	From	To	M	W	D	L	Win %
Unirea Tărlungeni	1 January 2010	25 June 2014	142	72	28	42	50.70
Academica Clinceni	1 July 2015	15 March 2016	22	12	3	7	54.55
ASA Târgu Mureș	15 June 2017	5 September 2017	6	4	1	1	66.67
FK Csíkszereda	10 September 2017	30 June 2018	26	19	5	2	73.08
Sportul Snagov	1 July 2018	17 January 2019	23	15	4	4	65.22
Metaloglobus București	18 January 2019	1 June 2019	17	8	4	5	47.06
UTA Arad	1 July 2019	31 January 2022	95	37	28	30	38.95
Universitatea Craiova	13 June 2022	9 August 2022	7	2	3	2	28.57
UTA Arad	1 November 2022	25 April 2023	22	6	6	10	27.27
Petrolul Ploiești	8 April 2024	6 June 2024	6	2	1	3	33.33
Oțelul Galați	19 March 2025	15 March 2026	42	18	10	14	42.86
Total			408	195	93	120	47.79

== Honours ==
=== Player ===
CFR Cluj

- UEFA Intertoto Cup runner-up: 2005

Unirea Urziceni

- Cupa României runner-up: 2007–08

=== Coach ===
Unirea Tărlungeni

- Liga III: 2012–13

UTA Arad

- Liga II: 2019–20
