= Claudiu Herea =

Romanian footballer

Personal information
- Full name: Claudiu Constantin Herea
- Date of birth: 16 March 1990 (age 36)
- Place of birth: Bucharest, Romania
- Height: 1.87 m (6 ft 2 in)
- Position: Central midfielder

Youth career
- Național București
- 2007–2009: Rapid București

Senior career*
Years	Team	Apps	(Gls)
2010–2011	Victoria Brănești	12	(0)
2012–2014	Viitorul Constanța	19	(0)
2013–2014	→ Rapid București (loan)	11	(1)
2015–2017	Balotești	68	(24)
2017	Sepsi OSK	18	(3)
2018	Balotești	12	(4)
2018	Petrolul Ploiești	15	(3)
2019–2022	Metaloglobus București	85	(26)
2022–2023	Tunari		
2023–2024	Mioveni	5	(0)
Total		245	(51)
- * Club domestic league appearances and goals

Claudiu Constantin Herea (born 16 March 1990) is a Romanian former footballer who played as a midfielder. He is the younger brother of Ovidiu Herea, also a footballer.

== Honours ==
Tunari

- Liga III: 2022–23
