= Ovidiu Herea =

Romanian footballer (born 1985)

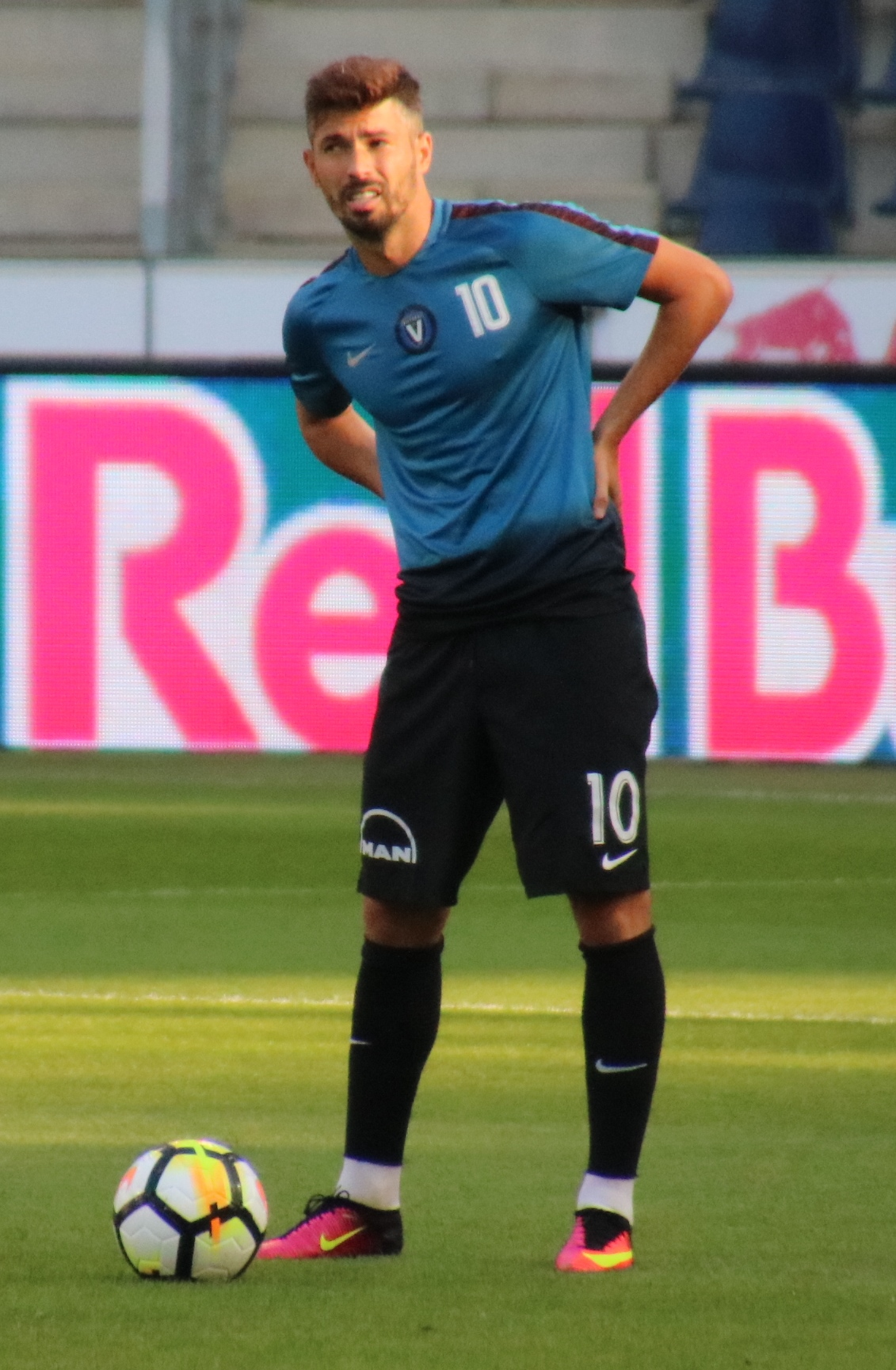
- Herea with Viitorul Constanța in 2017

Personal information
- Full name: Nicolae Ovidiu Herea
- Date of birth: 26 March 1985 (age 41)
- Place of birth: Bucharest, Romania
- Height: 1.80 m (5 ft 11 in)
- Position: Attacking midfielder

Youth career
- 1995–2003: Național București

Senior career*
Years	Team	Apps	(Gls)
2003–2007	Național București	66	(5)
2007–2013	Rapid București	165	(42)
2013–2015	Sion	46	(9)
2015–2016	Skoda Xanthi	19	(3)
2016	Pandurii Târgu Jiu	19	(3)
2017	Concordia Chiajna	19	(2)
2017	Viitorul Constanța	7	(0)
2018	Balotești	11	(5)
2018–2022	Metaloglobus București	107	(47)
2023–2025	Nanov		
Total		459	(116)

International career
2005–2007	Romania U21	8	(2)
2010–2011	Romania	2	(1)

Managerial career
- 2023: Concordia Chiajna (assistant)
- 2023–2025: Nanov (player/coach)
- * Club domestic league appearances and goals

Nicolae Ovidiu Herea (born 26 March 1985) is a Romanian former professional footballer who played as an attacking midfielder.

== Club career ==
=== Național București ===
Herea was born on 26 March 1985 in Bucharest, Romania and began playing junior-level football at the age of 10 at local club Național. He made his Divizia A debut on 16 August 2003, when coach Walter Zenga sent him in the 83rd minute to replace Bobi Verdeș in Național's 4–1 away loss to FC Brașov. He scored his first goal in the competition on 21 September 2006 in a 1–1 draw against Farul Constanța. The team reached the 2006 Cupa României final, where coach Cristiano Bergodi used him the entire match in the 1–0 loss to Rapid București.

=== Rapid București ===
In August 2007, Herea was transferred from Național to Rapid București for a €350,000 transfer fee. On 25 October 2009, he opened the scoring in a 1–1 derby draw against Steaua București. Subsequently, he helped the team eliminate Śląsk Wrocław by winning 4–2 on aggregate in the play-offs of the 2010–11 Europa League, reaching the group stage of the competition. There, he scored the only goal of a 1–0 away victory over Hapoel Tel Aviv with a header. During the same season, he also scored 12 goals in the league. Afterwards, Rapid reached the 2012 Cupa României final, where Herea played as a starter under coach Răzvan Lucescu before being replaced by Daniel Pancu in the 74th minute of the 1–0 loss to Dinamo București. On 14 April 2013, he opened the scoring from a free kick in a 1–1 draw against Steaua. During his time with Rapid, Herea received offers from AC Milan, Lyon, Bari and Standard Liège, but the moves fell through due to breakdowns in negotiations between the clubs or with the player.

=== Sion and Skoda Xanthi ===
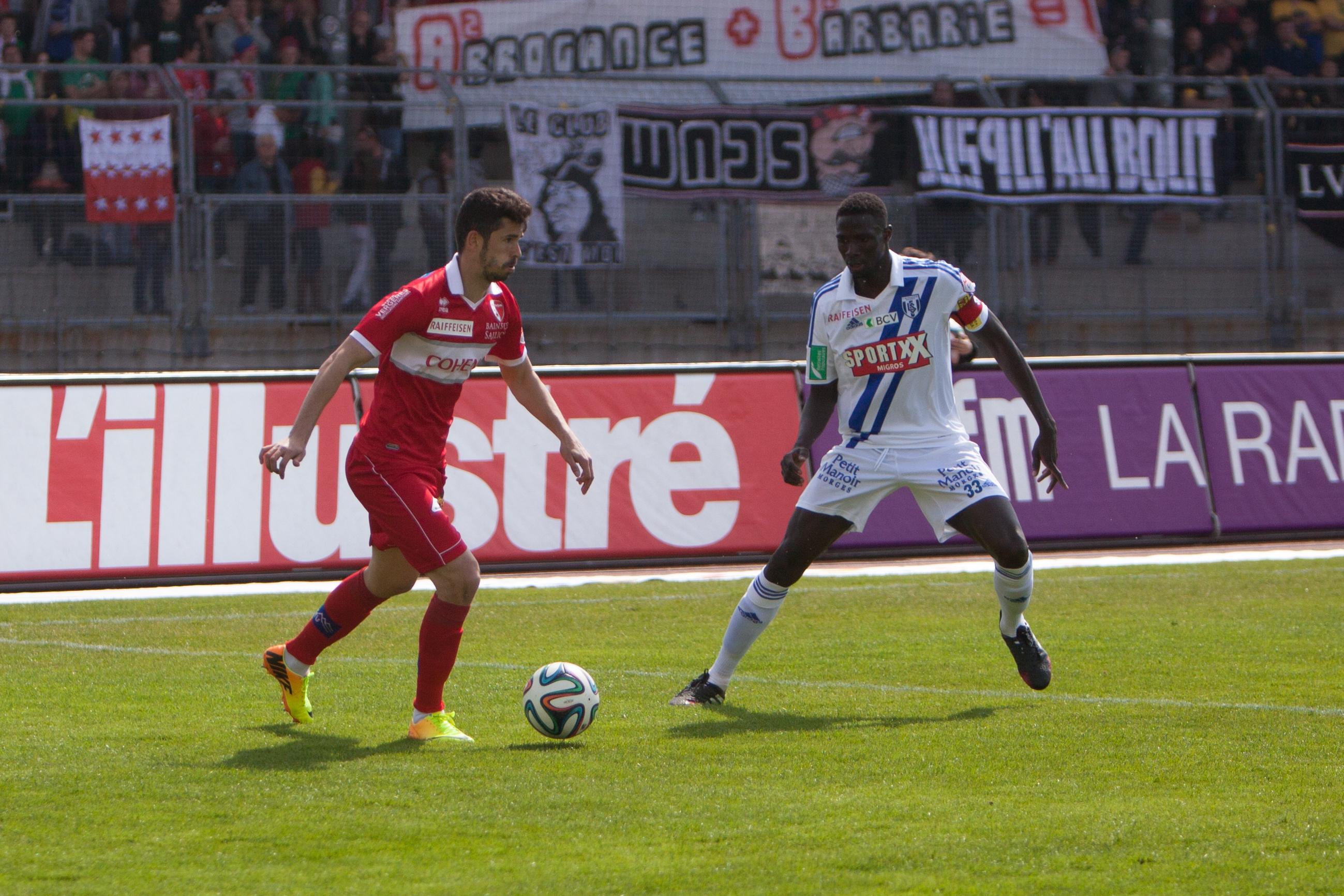
Herea in action for FC Sion during a 2014 match against Lausanne-Sport

In July 2013, Herea signed a three-year contract with Swiss side Sion. His Swiss Super League debut took place on 13 July, when coach Michel Decastel sent him on at halftime to replace Benjamin Kololli in a 2–0 away loss to Young Boys. On 2 November, he scored his first goal in the competition from a penalty kick in a 3–0 win over Luzern. Sion won the 2014–15 Swiss Cup, but coach Didier Tholot did not use Herea in the 3–0 victory against Basel in the final.

In the summer of 2015, Herea joined Skoda Xanthi. He made his Super League Greece debut on 23 August, when coach Răzvan Lucescu sent him in the 63rd minute to replace Pantelis Kapetanos in a 0–0 draw against PAOK. His first league goal was netted on 1 November, when he closed the scoring from a penalty in a 3–1 victory against Panetolikos.

=== Pandurii Târgu Jiu, Concordia Chiajna and Viitorul Constanța ===
In July 2016, Herea returned to Romania and signed with Pandurii Târgu Jiu. He managed to score in his first match for them in the 2–1 win over Universitatea Craiova in the first round of the 2016–17 season. Shortly afterwards, he played in both legs and scored once in the 5–2 aggregate loss to Maccabi Tel Aviv in the third qualifying round of the Europa League.

In January 2017, Herea left Pandurii to join Concordia Chiajna. On 15 May, he scored a goal in a 3–2 loss against his former team, Pandurii.

In June 2017, Herea was signed by title holders Viitorul Constanța. Coach Gheorghe Hagi sent him in the 71st minute to replace Dragoș Nedelcu in a 1–0 loss to Voluntari in the 2017 Supercupa României. He also appeared in both legs of the 4–1 aggregate loss to APOEL Nicosia in the 2017–18 Champions League third qualifying round. Herea accumulated a total of 276 matches and 52 goals in Liga I.

=== Late career ===
In February 2018, Herea went to play for second-tier club Balotești. In August 2018, he moved to Metaloglobus București in the same league. Herea left Metaloglobus in September 2022. From 2023 to 2025, he was a player-coach at Nanov, leading the team to first-place finishes in both seasons and promotion play-offs to Liga III, where they lost to Speed Academy Pitești and Păușești Otăsău, respectively. At all of these teams, he was teammates with his brother Claudiu.

== International career ==
Between 2005 and 2007, Herea played eight matches and scored two goals for Romania's under-21 national team.

Herea played two matches and scored once for Romania, making his debut on 3 September 2010, when coach Răzvan Lucescu sent him in the 77th minute to replace Răzvan Cociș in a 1–1 draw against Albania in the Euro 2012 qualifiers. In his second match, which took place on 10 August 2011, he scored the only goal in a 1–0 friendly win over San Marino.

== Managerial career ==
In January 2023, Herea became the assistant coach of Eugen Trică at Concordia Chiajna. From 2023 to 2025, he was a player-coach at Nanov, leading the team to first-place finishes in both seasons and promotion play-offs to Liga III, where they lost to Speed Academy Pitești and Păușești Otăsău, respectively.

== Personal life ==
His younger brother, Claudiu, was also a footballer.

== Career statistics ==
Appearances and goals by club, season and competition
Club	Season	League			National cup (Note: Includes Cupa României, Swiss Cup, Greek Cup)		Europe		Other		Total	
Club	Season	Division	Apps	Goals	Apps	Goals	Apps	Goals	Apps	Goals	Apps	Goals
Național București	2003–04	Divizia A	7	0	1	0	—		—		8	0
Național București	2004–05	Divizia A	7	0	1	0	—		—		8	0
Național București	2005–06	Divizia A	21	0	6	1	—		—		27	1
Național București	2006–07	Divizia A	31	5	2	0	—		—		33	5
Național București	Total		66	5	10	1	—		—		76	6
Rapid București	2007–08	Liga I	26	0	2	0	0	0	—		28	0
Rapid București	2008–09	Liga I	25	2	2	1	1 (Note: Appearance(s) in UEFA Cup/UEFA Europa League)	0	—		28	3
Rapid București	2009–10	Liga I	29	8	1	0	—		—		30	8
Rapid București	2010–11	Liga I	31	11	2	0	—		—		33	11
Rapid București	2011–12	Liga I	28	12	4	1	6	1	—		38	14
Rapid București	2012–13	Liga I	26	9	2	0	1	1	—		28	11
Rapid București	Total		165	42	13	2	8	2	—		186	46
Sion	2013–14	Swiss Super League	29	5	2	0	—		—		31	5
Sion	2014–15	Swiss Super League	17	4	3	1	—		—		20	5
Sion	Total		46	9	5	1	—		—		51	10
Skoda Xanthi	2015–16	Super League Greece	19	3	3	2	—		—		22	5
Pandurii Târgu Jiu	2016–17	Liga I	19	3	1	0	2	1	0	0	22	4
Concordia Chiajna	2016–17	Liga I	19	2	—		—		—		19	2
Viitorul Constanța	2017–18	Liga I	7	1	0	0	3 (Note: Two appearances in UEFA Champions League, one appearance in UEFA Europa League)	0	1 (Note: Appearance in Supercupa României)	0	11	1
Balotești	2017–18	Liga II	11	5	—		—		—		11	5
Metaloglobus București	2018–19	Liga II	33	11	0	0	—		—		33	11
Metaloglobus București	2019–20	Liga II	22	11	1	0	—		—		23	11
Metaloglobus București	2020–21	Liga II	23	14	1	0	—		—		24	14
Metaloglobus București	2021–22	Liga II	22	8	0	0	—		—		22	8
Metaloglobus București	2022–23	Liga II	7	3	0	0	—		—		7	3
Metaloglobus București	Total		107	47	2	0	—		—		109	47
Career total			459	117	34	6	13	3	1	0	507	126

=== International ===
Appearances and goals by national team and year
National team	Year	Apps	Goals
Romania
Romania	2010	1	0
Romania	2011	1	1
Total		2	1

Scores and results list Romania's goal tally first, score column indicates score after each Herea goal.

List of international goals scored by Ovidiu Herea
No.	Date	Venue	Opponent	Score	Result	Competition
1	10 August 2011	Stadio Olimpico di San Marino, Serravalle, San Marino	San Marino	1–0	1–0	Friendly

== Honours ==
=== Player ===
Național București

- Cupa României runner-up: 2005–06

Rapid București

- Cupa României runner-up: 2011–12

Sion

- Swiss Cup: 2014–15

Viitorul Constanța

- Supercupa României runner-up: 2017

Nanov

- Liga IV: 2023–24, 2024–25

=== Manager ===
Nanov

- Liga IV: 2023–24, 2024–25
