= Metaloglobus Stadium =

Multi-use stadium in Bucharest, Romania

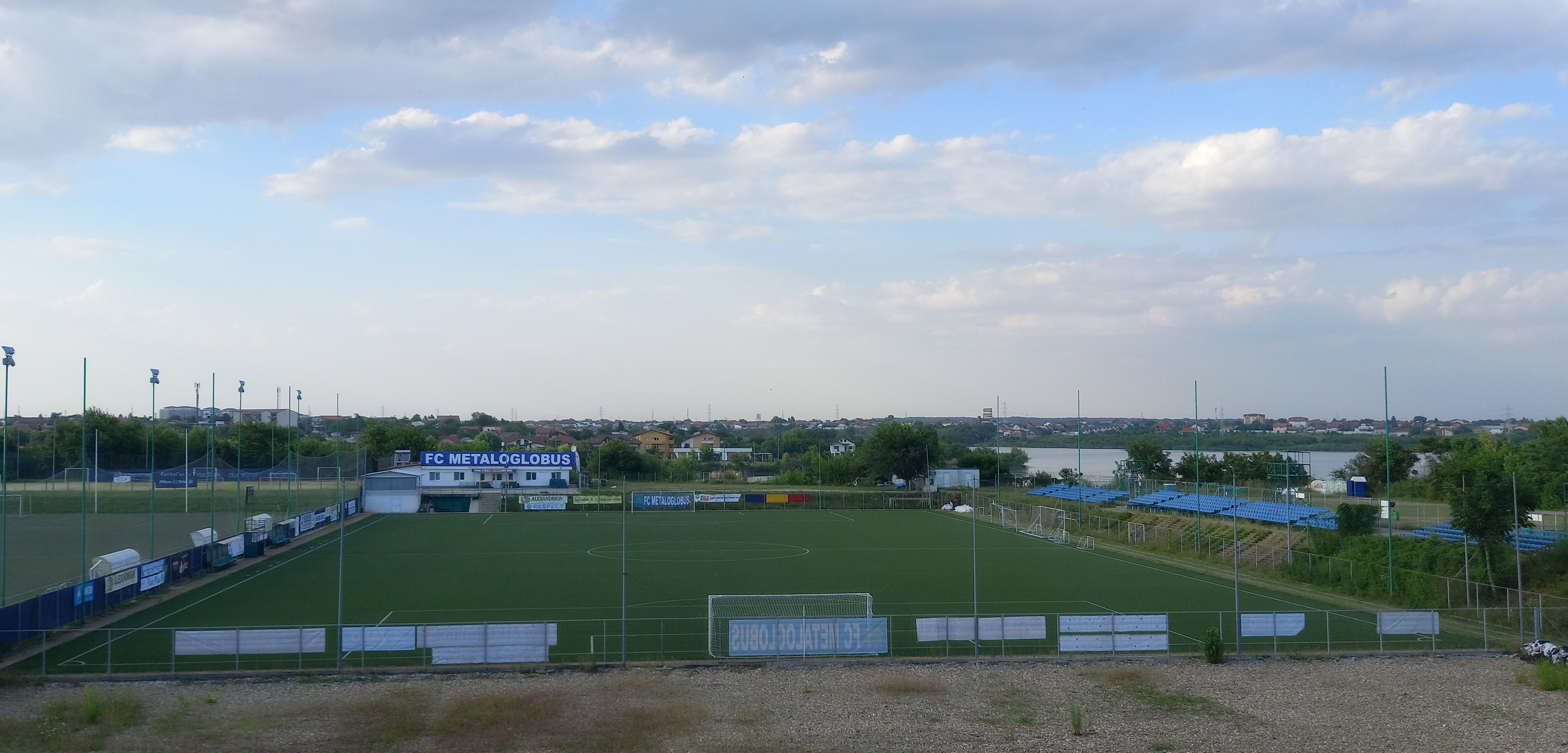
- Interactive map of Metaloglobus Stadium
- Address: Str. Ion Vlad, nr. 20
- Location: Bucharest, Romania
- Coordinates: 44°26′32.7″N 26°11′3.3″E
- Owner: Metaloglobus București
- Operator: Metaloglobus București
- Capacity: 1,000 seated
- Surface: Artificial turf

Construction
- Opened: 1956
- Renovated: 2011–2015

Tenant
- Metaloglobus București (1956–present)

The Metaloglobus Stadium is a multi-use stadium in Bucharest, Romania. It is used mostly for football matches and is the home ground of Metaloglobus București. The stadium holds 1,000 people.
