= List of Romanian football transfers summer 2022 =

This is a list of Romanian football transfers for the 2022–23 summer transfer window. Only moves featuring 2022–23 Liga I are listed.

== Liga I ==
=== Argeș Pitești ===
In:

| No. | Pos. | Nation | Player |
|---|---|---|---|
| 1 | GK | (Romania) ROU | Cătălin Straton (from FCSB) |
| 5 | MF | (Romania) ROU | Vlad Domșa (from Gaz Metan Mediaș) |
| 6 | MF | (France) FRA | Tony Njiké (from (France) Ajaccio, previously on loan at (France) Cholet) |
| 10 | MF | (Romania) ROU | Andreias Calcan (from (Hungary) Mezőkövesd) |
| 15 | MF | (Romania) ROU | Ramon Gașpar (from Gaz Metan Mediaș) |
| 16 | DF | (Portugal) POR | Fábio Vianna (from (Portugal) Académica) |
| 20 | FW | (France) FRA | Enzo Célestine (from (France) Sète) |
| 21 | MF | (Haiti) HAI | Bryan Alceus (from (Azerbaijan) Zira) |
| 23 | DF | (Romania) ROU | Marius Constantin (from Universitatea Craiova) |
| 24 | FW | (Madagascar) MAD | Dorian Bertrand (from (France) Nancy) |
| 27 | FW | (Madagascar) MAD | Julio Donisa (from (France) Le Mans) |
| 70 | MF | (Croatia) CRO | Antonio Jakoliš (from (Croatia) Šibenik) |
| 77 | MF | (Romania) ROU | Răzvan Covaci (from Gaz Metan Mediaș) |
| 92 | DF | (Democratic Republic of the Congo) COD | Mike Cestor (Free agent) |
| — | MF | (Romania) ROU | Roberto Hațegan (from Unirea Bascov) |

Out:

| No. | Pos. | Nation | Player |
|---|---|---|---|
| 7 | MF | (Portugal) POR | Diogo Viana (Free agent) |
| 9 | FW | (Romania) ROU | Cristian Dumitru (loan return to FCSB, later on loan to Mioveni) |
| 10 | MF | (Romania) ROU | Cristian Tănase (Free agent) |
| 14 | DF | (Portugal) POR | João Miguel (Free agent) |
| 21 | MF | (Croatia) CRO | Antun Palić (Free agent) |
| 22 | GK | (Romania) ROU | Flavius Croitoru (to Mioveni) |
| 23 | FW | (Romania) ROU | Cătălin Barbu (Free agent) |
| 25 | DF | (Romania) ROU | Deian Boldor (to Chindia Târgoviște) |
| 28 | FW | (Curaçao) CUW | Jafar Arias (Free agent) |
| 29 | MF | (Romania) ROU | Denis Dumitrașcu (to Chindia Târgoviște) |
| 30 | DF | (Romania) ROU | Nicolae Mușat (Free agent) |
| 44 | FW | (Italy) ITA | Said Ahmed Said (Free agent) |
| 89 | MF | (Romania) ROU | Georgian Honciu (Free agent) |
| 90 | FW | (Nigeria) NGA | Kehinde Fatai (Free agent) |

=== Botoșani ===
In:

| No. | Pos. | Nation | Player |
|---|---|---|---|
| 2 | DF | (Netherlands) NED | Shaquill Sno (from (Bulgaria) Lokomotiv Plovdiv) |
| 3 | DF | (Romania) ROU | Adrian Moescu (loan return from Dante Botoșani) |
| 8 | MF | (Romania) ROU | Marian Obedeanu (from Gaz Metan Mediaș) |
| 17 | FW | (Guinea) GUI | Sekou Camara (loan return from Politehnica Iași) |
| 82 | GK | (Romania) ROU | Andrei Ureche (from Academica Clinceni) |

Out:

| No. | Pos. | Nation | Player |
|---|---|---|---|
| 2 | DF | (Romania) ROU | Denis Haruț (loan return to FCSB) |
| 5 | DF | (Cameroon) CMR | Joyskim Dawa (to FCSB) |
| 8 | MF | (Romania) ROU | David Croitoru (to FC U Craiova) |
| 22 | GK | (Romania) ROU | Mario Contra (to Unirea Slobozia) |
| 28 | FW | (Albania) ALB | Realdo Fili (Free agent) |
| 47 | DF | (Germany) GER | Christopher Braun (to CFR Cluj) |

=== CFR Cluj ===
In:

| No. | Pos. | Nation | Player |
|---|---|---|---|
| 1 | GK | (Italy) ITA | Simone Scuffet (from (Cyprus) APOEL) |
| 2 | DF | (Croatia) CRO | Karlo Bručić (from (Slovenia) Koper) |
| 17 | FW | (Spain) ESP | Jefté Betancor (from Farul Constanța) |
| 20 | MF | (Denmark) DEN | Vito Mistrati (from (Denmark) Randers) |
| 33 | DF | (Croatia) CRO | Denis Kolinger (on loan from (Denmark) Vejle) |
| 47 | DF | (Germany) GER | Christopher Braun (from Botoșani) |
| 73 | MF | (Croatia) CRO | Karlo Muhar (from (Poland) Lech Poznań, previously on loan at (Bulgaria) CSKA Sofia) |
| — | GK | (Romania) ROU | Ionuț Rus (loan return from Ripensia Timișoara) |
| — | MF | (Romania) ROU | Denis Rusu (loan return from Chindia Târgoviște) |
| — | DF | (Romania) ROU | Gheorghe Tomșa (loan return from Hermannstadt) |
| — | FW | (Serbia) SRB | Dušan Čelar (loan return from Dinamo București) |

Out:

| No. | Pos. | Nation | Player |
|---|---|---|---|
| 5 | DF | (Bulgaria) BUL | Kristian Dimitrov (loan return to (Croatia) Hajduk Split) |
| 8 | MF | (Iceland) ISL | Rúnar Már Sigurjónsson (Free agent) |
| 9 | FW | (France) FRA | Billel Omrani (Free agent) |
| 11 | MF | (Romania) ROU | Alexandru Chipciu (to Universitatea Cluj) |
| 14 | MF | (Romania) ROU | Raoul Mal (Free agent) |
| 16 | DF | (Bosnia and Herzegovina) BIH | Mateo Sušić (to (Cyprus) APOEL) |
| 17 | FW | (Romania) ROU | Marko Dugandžić (to Rapid București) |
| 18 | FW | (Romania) ROU | Valentin Costache (to Rapid București) |
| 20 | FW | (Romania) ROU | Cristian Neguț (loan return to Chindia Târgoviște) |
| 23 | GK | (Croatia) CRO | Karlo Letica (Free agent) |
| 29 | DF | (Algeria) ALG | Rachid Bouhenna (to FCSB) |
| 76 | MF | (Mauritania) MTN | Guessouma Fofana (Free agent) |
| 82 | MF | (Romania) ROU | Alin Fică (on loan to Politehnica Iași) |
| 89 | GK | (Romania) ROU | Otto Hindrich (on loan to (Hungary) Kisvárda) |
| 96 | DF | (Romania) ROU | Florin Ștefan (to Rapid București) |
| — | DF | (Romania) ROU | Mihai Butean (to Hermannstadt, previously on loan at Chindia Târgoviște) |
| — | DF | (Romania) ROU | Denis Ciobotariu (to Sepsi Sfântu Gheorghe, previously on loan at Voluntari) |
| — | DF | (Romania) ROU | Rareș Ispas (to Sepsi Sfântu Gheorghe, previously on loan) |
| — | DF | (Ivory Coast) CIV | Ulrich Meleke (to Voluntari, previously on loan) |
| — | MF | (Argentina) ARG | Jonathan Rodríguez (to Sepsi Sfântu Gheorghe, previously on loan at Dinamo București) |
| — | FW | (Romania) ROU | Nicolae Carnat (Free agent, previously on loan at Rapid București) |
| — | FW | (Romania) ROU | Daniel Paraschiv (to Hermannstadt, previously on loan) |

=== Chindia Târgoviște ===
In:

| No. | Pos. | Nation | Player |
|---|---|---|---|
| 2 | DF | (Romania) ROU | Constantin Dima (from UTA Arad) |
| 5 | MF | (Lithuania) LTU | Modestas Vorobjovas (from UTA Arad) |
| 10 | FW | (Romania) ROU | Cristian Neguț (loan return from CFR Cluj) |
| 23 | MF | (Romania) ROU | Andreas Mihaiu (from Dinamo București) |
| 25 | DF | (Romania) ROU | Deian Boldor (from Argeș Pitești) |
| 80 | DF | (Romania) ROU | Denis Dumitrașcu (from Argeș Pitești) |
| 92 | DF | (Romania) ROU | Robert Riza (from Astra Giurgiu) |

Out:

| No. | Pos. | Nation | Player |
|---|---|---|---|
| 2 | DF | (Romania) ROU | Marius Martac (Politehnica Iași) |
| 6 | MF | (Romania) ROU | Paul Iacob (to Rapid București) |
| 7 | DF | (Romania) ROU | Laurențiu Corbu (Free agent) |
| 10 | FW | (Bulgaria) BUL | Tsvetelin Chunchukov (loan return to Sepsi OSK, later on loan to Steaua București) |
| 11 | FW | (Romania) ROU | Daniel Florea (to Voluntari) |
| 14 | FW | (France) FRA | Richard Sila (Free agent) |
| 16 | DF | (Romania) ROU | Mihai Butean (loan return to CFR Cluj) |
| 20 | DF | (Albania) ALB | Simo Rrumbullaku (Free agent) |
| 22 | DF | (Romania) ROU | Andrei Pițian (to Universitatea Cluj) |
| 23 | DF | (Slovenia) SVN | Milan Kocić (Free agent) |
| 86 | MF | (Romania) ROU | Denis Rusu (loan return to CFR Cluj) |
| 91 | MF | (Haiti) HAI | Mikaël Cantave (Free agent) |
| 99 | GK | (Romania) ROU | Antonio Pop (Free agent) |

=== Farul Constanța ===
In:

| No. | Pos. | Nation | Player |
|---|---|---|---|
| 3 | DF | (Romania) ROU | Mihai Popescu (from (Scotland) Heart of Midlothian, previously on loan at (Scotland) Hamilton Academical) |
| 4 | DF | (Ivory Coast) CIV | Kevin Doukouré (from (Slovenia) Tabor Sežana) |
| 6 | MF | (Romania) ROU | Tudor Băluță (from (England) Brighton & Hove Albion) |
| 8 | MF | (Romania) ROU | Carlo Casap (loan return from Concordia Chiajna) |
| 10 | FW | (Romania) ROU | Vlad Morar (from Dinamo București) |
| 11 | MF | (Romania) ROU | Gabriel Torje (from Dinamo București) |
| 16 | MF | (Romania) ROU | Dragoș Nedelcu (from FCSB, previously on loan) |
| 20 | DF | (Romania) ROU | Romario Benzar (from (Italy) Lecce) |
| 23 | MF | (Romania) ROU | Robert Ion (from FCSB, previously on loan at Academica Clinceni) |
| 25 | DF | (Benin) BEN | David Kiki (from (Bulgaria) Arda Kardzhali) |
| 26 | DF | (Democratic Republic of the Congo) COD | Ayrton Mboko (from Academica Clinceni) |
| 28 | DF | (Romania) ROU | Darius Grosu (loan return from Metaloglobus București) |
| 31 | GK | (Romania) ROU | Alexandru Buzbuchi (from Gaz Metan Mediaș) |
| 32 | DF | (France) FRA | Jérémy Corinus (from Academica Clinceni) |
| — | FW | (Romania) ROU | Denis Alibec (from (Turkey) Kayserispor, previously on loan at (Greece) Atromitos) |
| — | DF | (Romania) ROU | Marius Leca (loan return from Dunărea Călărași) |

Out:

| No. | Pos. | Nation | Player |
|---|---|---|---|
| 4 | DF | (Martinique) MTQ | Damien Dussaut (to Rapid București) |
| 6 | DF | (Netherlands) NED | Bradley de Nooijer (to (Bulgaria) CSKA Sofia) |
| 10 | FW | (Spain) ESP | Jefté Betancor (to CFR Cluj) |
| 11 | MF | (Romania) ROU | Andrei Ciobanu (to Rapid București) |
| 28 | FW | (Romania) ROU | Gabriel Iancu (loan return to (Russia) Akhmat Grozny) |
| 30 | MF | (Romania) ROU | Florin Purece (to Universitatea Cluj) |
| 92 | FW | (Nigeria) NGA | Michael Omoh (Free agent) |
| 94 | GK | (Romania) ROU | Laurențiu Brănescu (to Universitatea Cluj) |

=== FC U Craiova ===
In:

| No. | Pos. | Nation | Player |
|---|---|---|---|
| 17 | MF | (Romania) ROU | Alexandru Raicea (loan return from Mioveni) |
| 21 | MF | (Romania) ROU | David Croitoru (from Botoșani) |
| 27 | GK | (Romania) ROU | Ionuț Gurău (from Unirea Slobozia) |
| 28 | FW | (France) FRA | Yassine Bahassa (from (France) Quevilly-Rouen) |
| 35 | DF | (Portugal) POR | André Duarte (from (Portugal) Estrela da Amadora) |

Out:

| No. | Pos. | Nation | Player |
|---|---|---|---|
| 4 | DF | (Croatia) CRO | Dominik Kovačić (to (Hungary) Kisvárda) |
| 13 | DF | (France) FRA | Bradley Diallo ( (Finland) SJK Seinäjoki) |
| 22 | GK | (Romania) ROU | Alberto Cobrea (Free agent) |
| 23 | DF | (Romania) ROU | Sorin Bușu (Free agent) |

=== FCSB ===
In:

| No. | Pos. | Nation | Player |
|---|---|---|---|
| 1 | GK | (Romania) ROU | Răzvan Ducan (loan return from Mioveni) |
| 4 | DF | (Estonia) EST | Joonas Tamm (from (Ukraine) Vorskla Poltava, previously on loan at (Estonia) Flora) |
| 5 | DF | (Cameroon) CMR | Joyskim Dawa (from Botoșani) |
| 6 | DF | (Romania) ROU | Denis Haruț (loan return from Botoșani) |
| 15 | MF | (Romania) ROU | Mihai Lixandru (loan return from Mioveni) |
| 28 | DF | (Romania) ROU | Alexandru Pantea (loan return from Hermannstadt) |
| 29 | DF | (Algeria) ALG | Rachid Bouhenna (from CFR Cluj) |
| — | MF | (Romania) ROU | Ovidiu Horșia (loan return from Gaz Metan Mediaș) |
| — | MF | (Romania) ROU | Aurelian Ciuciulete (loan return from Unirea Constanța) |
| — | MF | (Romania) ROU | Andrei Pandele (loan return from Metaloglobus) |

Out:

| No. | Pos. | Nation | Player |
|---|---|---|---|
| 1 | GK | (Romania) ROU | Cătălin Straton (to Argeș Pitești) |
| 4 | DF | (Romania) ROU | Andrei Miron (to (Israel) Hapoel Haifa) |
| 24 | MF | (Romania) ROU | Robert Ion (to Farul Constanța, previously on loan at Academica Clinceni) |
| 16 | MF | (Romania) ROU | Dragoș Nedelcu (to Farul Constanța, previously on loan) |
| 20 | FW | (Romania) ROU | Andrei Burlacu (Free agent) |
| 22 | FW | (Romania) ROU | Valentin Gheorghe (on loan to (Turkey) Ümraniyespor) |
| 28 | FW | (Romania) ROU | Claudiu Keșerü (to UTA Arad) |
| 55 | DF | (Brazil) BRA | Paulo Vinícius (Free agent) |
| — | MF | (Romania) ROU | Gabriel Simion (Free agent, previously on loan at (Cyprus) Aris Limassol) |
| — | FW | (Romania) ROU | Cristian Dumitru (on loan to Mioveni, previously on loan at Argeș Pitești) |

=== Hermannstadt ===
In:

| No. | Pos. | Nation | Player |
|---|---|---|---|
| 5 | MF | (Romania) ROU | Alexandru Răuță (from Dinamo București) |
| 11 | MF | (Romania) ROU | Dragoș Iancu (from Gaz Metan Mediaș) |
| 17 | MF | (Romania) ROU | Mihai Butean (from CFR Cluj, previously on loan at Chindia Târgoviște) |
| 30 | FW | (Romania) ROU | Daniel Paraschiv (from CFR Cluj, previously on loan) |

Out:

| No. | Pos. | Nation | Player |
|---|---|---|---|
| 11 | DF | (Romania) ROU | Bogdan Jica (loan return to Gaz Metan Mediaș) |
| 21 | DF | (Romania) ROU | Gheorghe Tomșa (loan return to CFR Cluj) |
| 92 | FW | (Netherlands) NED | Stanley Elbers (Free agent) |
| 98 | DF | (Romania) ROU | Alexandru Pantea (loan return to FCSB) |

=== Mioveni ===
In:

| No. | Pos. | Nation | Player |
|---|---|---|---|
| 13 | GK | (Romania) ROU | Flavius Croitoru (from Argeș Pitești) |
| 18 | FW | (Romania) ROU | Cristian Dumitru (on loan from FCSB, previously on loan at Argeș Pitești) |

Out:

| No. | Pos. | Nation | Player |
|---|---|---|---|
| 4 | MF | (Romania) ROU | Mihai Lixandru (loan return to FCSB) |
| 11 | MF | (Romania) ROU | Lucian Dumitriu (to Petrolul Ploiești) |
| 17 | MF | (Jamaica) JAM | Jason Wright (Free agent) |
| 28 | MF | (Romania) ROU | Alexandru Raicea (loan return to FC U Craiova) |
| 33 | FW | (Poland) POL | Paweł Tomczyk (to Politehnica Iași) |
| 68 | GK | (Romania) ROU | Răzvan Ducan (loan return to FCSB) |

=== Petrolul Ploiești ===
In:

| No. | Pos. | Nation | Player |
|---|---|---|---|
| 7 | FW | (Romania) ROU | Gheorghe Grozav (from (Hungary) MTK Budapest) |
| 8 | MF | (Brazil) BRA | Jair (from (Finland) HJK) |
| 22 | FW | (North Macedonia) MKD | Mirko Ivanovski (from Dinamo București) |
| 30 | DF | (Romania) ROU | Gabriel Tamaș (from Voluntari) |
| 35 | FW | (Nigeria) NGA | Christian Irobiso (from Dinamo București) |
| 44 | MF | (Romania) ROU | Lucian Dumitriu (from Mioveni) |
| 99 | DF | (Romania) ROU | Florin Borța (on loan from Universitatea Craiova, previously on loan at Concordia Chiajna) |
| — | DF | (Cape Verde) CPV | Félix Mathaus (from Gaz Metan Mediaș) |

Out:

| No. | Pos. | Nation | Player |
|---|---|---|---|
| 6 | DF | (Romania) ROU | Viorel Lică (to Politehnica Iași) |
| 8 | MF | (Romania) ROU | Silviu Pană (Free agent) |
| 9 | FW | (Romania) ROU | Marius Coman (Free agent) |
| 13 | DF | (Bosnia and Herzegovina) BIH | Vedran Vrhovac (to (Slovenia) Radomlje) |
| 19 | FW | (Germany) GER | Senad Jarović (to (Bosnia and Herzegovina) Sloboda Tuzla) |
| 22 | DF | (Romania) ROU | Sergiu Pîrvulescu (loan return to Kids Tâmpa Brașov) |
| 23 | MF | (Romania) ROU | Vlad Prejmerean (on loan to Unirea Slobozia) |
| 33 | MF | (Romania) ROU | Marius Chindriș (Free agent) |
| 36 | MF | (Romania) ROU | Alin Boțogan (on loan to Unirea Slobozia) |
| — | FW | (Cameroon) CMR | Serge Ekollo (to Unirea Slobozia, previously on loan at Buzău) |
| — | FW | (Albania) ALB | Armando Vajushi (Free agent) |

=== Rapid București ===
In:

| No. | Pos. | Nation | Player |
|---|---|---|---|
| 1 | GK | (Romania) ROU | Codruț Sandu (from Steaua București) |
| 3 | DF | (Romania) ROU | Florin Ștefan (from CFR Cluj) |
| 6 | MF | (Romania) ROU | Paul Iacob (from Chindia Târgoviște) |
| 8 | MF | (Romania) ROU | Andrei Ciobanu (from Farul Constanța) |
| 9 | MF | (Romania) ROU | Valentin Costache (from CFR Cluj) |
| 15 | DF | (Martinique) MTQ | Damien Dussaut (from Farul Constanța) |
| 26 | MF | (Romania) ROU | Alexandru Crivac (from FC Argeș Pitești) |
| 28 | MF | (Romania) ROU | Alexandru Mățan (on loan from Columbus Crew) |
| 45 | MF | (Croatia) CRO | Marko Dugandžić (from CFR Cluj) |
| 96 | MF | (France) FRA | Jayson Papeau (from (Poland) Warta Poznan) |

Out:

| No. | Pos. | Nation | Player |
|---|---|---|---|
| 1 | GK | (Romania) ROU | Valentin Mărgărit (to Progresul Spartac) |
| 3 | DF | (Romania) ROU | Luca Florică (to Progresul Spartac) |
| 5 | FW | (Romania) ROU | Ciprian Popescu (to Progresul Spartac) |
| 8 | FW | (Romania) ROU | Nicolae Carnat (Mioveni) |
| 9 | FW | (Romania) ROU | Adrian Bălan (to Universitatea Cluj) |
| 13 | MF | (Romania) ROU | Lucian Goge (Concordia Chiajna) |
| 15 | DF | (Romania) ROU | Enrichi Finica (on loan to Politehnica Iași) |
| 18 | MF | (Morocco) MAR | Saifeddine Alami (Hassania Agadir) |
| 21 | DF | (Argentina) ARG | Matías Pérez Acuña (Badajoz) |
| 29 | MF | (Romania) ROU | Albert Stahl (on loan to UTA Arad) |
| 30 | DF | (Romania) ROU | Alexandru Dandea (to Șelimbăr) |
| 33 | MF | (Romania) ROU | Raul Costin (Retired) |
| 44 | MF | (Romania) ROU | Alin Demici (to Dinamo București) |
| 94 | MF | (Romania) ROU | Cătălin Hlistei (to Universitatea Cluj) |
| — | DF | (Romania) ROU | Mircea Leasă (Free agent) |
| — | MF | (Romania) ROU | Rareș Lazăr (FC Brașov) |

=== Sepsi Sfântu Gheorghe ===
In:

| No. | Pos. | Nation | Player |
|---|---|---|---|
| 27 | DF | (Romania) ROU | Rareș Ispas (from CFR Cluj, previously on loan) |
| — | DF | (Romania) ROU | Denis Ciobotariu (from CFR Cluj, previously on loan at Voluntari) |
| — | MF | (Romania) ROU | Ion Gheorghe (from Voluntari) |
| — | MF | (Guinea-Bissau) GNB | Francisco Júnior (from Gaz Metan Mediaș) |
| — | MF | (Romania) ROU | Cosmin Matei (from Dinamo București) |
| — | MF | (Argentina) ARG | Jonathan Rodríguez (from CFR Cluj, previously on loan at Dinamo București) |
| — | FW | (Venezuela) VEN | Mario Rondón (from (Poland) Radomiak Radom) |

Out:

| No. | Pos. | Nation | Player |
|---|---|---|---|
| 4 | DF | (Romania) ROU | Răzvan Tincu (to Politehnica Iași) |
| 8 | MF | (Romania) ROU | Gabriel Vașvari (to Politehnica Iași) |
| 17 | MF | (Guinea) GUI | Boubacar Fofana (Free agent) |
| 24 | MF | (Romania) ROU | István Fülöp (Free agent) |
| 42 | FW | (Netherlands) NED | Kevin Luckassen (loan return to (Turkey) Kayserispor) |
| — | FW | (Bulgaria) BUL | Tsvetelin Chunchukov (on loan to Steaua București, previously on loan at Chindia Târgoviște) |

=== Universitatea Cluj ===
In:

| No. | Pos. | Nation | Player |
|---|---|---|---|
| 27 | MF | (Romania) ROU | Ovidiu Bic (from Universitatea Craiova) |
| — | GK | (Romania) ROU | Laurențiu Brănescu (from Farul Constanța) |
| — | DF | (Lithuania) LTU | Rolandas Baravykas (from UTA Arad) |
| — | DF | (Romania) ROU | Marius Briceag (from Voluntari) |
| — | DF | (Romania) ROU | Andrei Pițian (from Chindia Târgoviște) |
| — | DF | (Romania) ROU | Tudor Telcean (loan return from Șelimbăr) |
| — | MF | (Romania) ROU | Alexandru Chipciu (from CFR Cluj) |
| — | MF | (Romania) ROU | Cătălin Hlistei (from Rapid București) |
| — | MF | (Romania) ROU | Cosmin Meșter (loan return from Zalău) |
| — | MF | (Romania) ROU | Florin Purece (from Farul Constanța) |
| — | FW | (Romania) ROU | Adrian Bălan (from Rapid București) |

Out:

| No. | Pos. | Nation | Player |
|---|---|---|---|
| 2 | DF | (Spain) ESP | Roberto Alarcón (Free agent) |
| 4 | MF | (Romania) ROU | Ciprian Călugăr (on loan to Unirea Dej) |
| 8 | MF | (Romania) ROU | Cristian Balgiu (to Steaua București) |
| 21 | DF | (Romania) ROU | Mihai Dobrescu (to UTA Arad) |
| 23 | DF | (Romania) ROU | Costinel Gugu (to Steaua București) |
| 31 | MF | (Romania) ROU | Marius Ciobanu (to Unirea Slobozia) |
| 47 | MF | (Romania) ROU | Vlad Moraru (on loan to Zalău) |
| 83 | MF | (Portugal) POR | Sérgio Ribeiro (Free agent) |
| 91 | FW | (Romania) ROU | Valentin Alexandru (Free agent) |

=== Universitatea Craiova ===
In:

| No. | Pos. | Nation | Player |
|---|---|---|---|
| 12 | GK | (Romania) ROU | Laurențiu Popescu (loan return from Brașov) |
| 26 | MF | (Bulgaria) BUL | Antoni Ivanov (loan return from Dinamo București) |
| — | DF | (Switzerland) SUI | Ivan Martić (from (Switzerland) Sion) |
| — | DF | (Brazil) BRA | Raul Silva (from (Portugal) Braga, previously on loan at (Portugal) Estoril) |
| — | MF | (Romania) ROU | Vasile Constantin (loan return from Brașov) |
| — | MF | (Romania) ROU | Alexandru Mărieș (loan return from Politehnica Iași) |

Out:

| No. | Pos. | Nation | Player |
|---|---|---|---|
| 15 | MF | (France) FRA | Lyes Houri (loan return to (Hungary) Fehérvár) |
| 23 | DF | (Romania) ROU | Marius Constantin (to Argeș Pitești) |
| 27 | MF | (Romania) ROU | Ovidiu Bic (to Universitatea Cluj) |
| 29 | DF | (Guinea) GUI | Antoine Conte (Free agent) |
| 88 | FW | (Romania) ROU | Atanas Trică (on loan to Steaua București) |
| — | DF | (Romania) ROU | Florin Borța (on loan to Petrolul Ploiești, previously on loan at Concordia Chiajna) |

=== UTA Arad ===
In:

| No. | Pos. | Nation | Player |
|---|---|---|---|
| 29 | MF | (Romania) ROU | Albert Stahl (on loan from Rapid București) |
| — | DF | (Mauritania) MTN | Aly Abeid (from (France) Valenciennes) |
| — | DF | (Romania) ROU | Andrei Chindriș (from (Portugal) Santa Clara) |
| — | DF | (Romania) ROU | Mihai Dobrescu (from Universitatea Cluj) |
| — | DF | (Albania) ALB | Erion Hoxhallari (from (Albania) Tirana) |
| — | DF | (Romania) ROU | Cristian Maxim (from Gaz Metan Mediaș) |
| — | MF | (Argentina) ARG | Juan Cascini (from (Bolivia) The Strongest) |
| — | MF | (Romania) ROU | Raul Șteau (from Gaz Metan Mediaș) |
| — | FW | (Romania) ROU | Claudiu Keșerü (from FCSB) |
| — | FW | (Moldova) MDA | Virgiliu Postolachi (from (Belgium) Mouscron) |

Out:

| No. | Pos. | Nation | Player |
|---|---|---|---|
| 2 | DF | (Romania) ROU | Constantin Dima (to Chindia Târgoviște) |
| 5 | MF | (Lithuania) LTU | Modestas Vorobjovas (to Chindia Târgoviște) |
| 9 | FW | (Croatia) CRO | Filip Dangubić (Free agent) |
| 11 | FW | (Lithuania) LTU | Karolis Laukžemis (Free agent) |
| 23 | DF | (Lithuania) LTU | Rolandas Baravykas (to Universitatea Cluj) |
| 26 | FW | (Italy) ITA | Nicolao Dumitru (Free agent) |
| 55 | DF | (Russia) RUS | Yevgeni Shlyakov (Free agent) |
| 70 | FW | (Canada) CAN | Easton Ongaro (Free agent) |

=== Voluntari ===
In:

| No. | Pos. | Nation | Player |
|---|---|---|---|
| 3 | DF | (Ivory Coast) CIV | Ulrich Meleke (from CFR Cluj, previously on loan) |
| 88 | FW | (Romania) ROU | Alexandru Stoica (loan return from Unirea Slobozia) |
| — | GK | (Romania) ROU | Octavian Vâlceanu (from Gaz Metan Mediaș) |
| — | DF | (Albania) ALB | Naser Aliji (from (Hungary) Budapest Honvéd) |
| — | DF | (Romania) ROU | Salvatore Marrone (on loan from Miercurea Ciuc) |
| — | DF | (Argentina) ARG | Patricio Matricardi (from Gaz Metan Mediaș) |
| — | MF | (Romania) ROU | Mihai Răduț (from (Cyprus) Aris Limassol) |
| — | FW | (Romania) ROU | Daniel Florea (from Chindia Târgoviște) |

Out:

| No. | Pos. | Nation | Player |
|---|---|---|---|
| 6 | DF | (Romania) ROU | Marius Briceag (to Universitatea Cluj) |
| 8 | MF | (Romania) ROU | Ion Gheorghe (to Sepsi Sfântu Gheorghe) |
| 11 | FW | (Israel) ISR | Idan Golan (Free agent) |
| 13 | DF | (Romania) ROU | Denis Ciobotariu (loan return to CFR Cluj, later signed by Sepsi Sfântu Gheorghe) |
| 27 | FW | (Ivory Coast) CIV | Muhamed Olawale (loan return to (Italy) Parma) |
| 30 | DF | (Romania) ROU | Gabriel Tamaș (to Petrolul Ploiești) |
| 50 | MF | (Romania) ROU | Constantin Budescu (Free agent) |
| — | MF | (Romania) ROU | Claudiu Borțoneanu (to Corvinul Hunedoara, previously on loan at Metaloglobus București) |
| — | MF | (Romania) ROU | Neluț Roșu (to Dinamo București, previously on loan at Concordia Chiajna) |
