= 2021–22 Liga III =

Liga III
- Season: 2021–22
- Promoted: Oțelul Galați; Progresul Spartac; Slatina; Dumbrăvița; Minaur Baia Mare
- Relegated: Hermannstadt II; Progresul Șomcuta Mare; Frontiera Curtici; Dinamo II București; Fetești; Făurei; Sticla Arieșul Turda; Argeș II Pitești; Sportul Chiscani; Pașcani; Oltenița; Luceafărul Oradea; Poli Timișoara
- Matches: 1,374
- Goals: 4,322 (3.15 per match)
- Top goalscorer: Ndiaye (33 goals) (CSM Reșița)
- Biggest home win: Farul II 9–0 Oltenița
- Biggest away win: Luceafărul 0–12 Minaur
- Highest scoring: Luceafărul 0–12 Minaur
- Longest winning run: 13 matches: Hunedoara
- Longest unbeaten run: 28 matches: Hunedoara; CSM Reșița
- Longest winless run: 28 matches: Luceafărul Oradea
- Longest losing run: 24 matches: Luceafărul Oradea
- All statistics correct as of 8 June 2022.

The 2021–22 Liga III was the 66th season of Liga III, the third tier of the Romanian football league system. The season began in August 2021 and ended on 28 May 2022.

This season was the second consecutive with a format that included 100 teams (10x10). The format was changed before the previous season, due to the financial problems generated by the COVID-19 pandemic. The difference this season is that a play-off and play-out was introduced between the regular season and the promotion play-offs.

== Team changes ==
=== To Liga III ===
Promoted from Liga IV

- Dinamo Bacău
  (debut)
- Fetești
  (after 7 years of absence)
- Real Bradu
  (debut)
- Voința Lupac
  (debut)
- Viitorul Șimian
  (after 15 years of absence)
- Pobeda Stár Bišnov
  (debut)
- Frontiera Curtici
  (after 16 years of absence)
- Aurul Brad
  (after 16 years of absence)

Relegated from Liga II

- Comuna Recea
  (after 1 year of absence)
- CSM Reșița
  (after 2 years of absence)
- Slatina
  (after 1 year of absence)
- Pandurii Targu Jiu
  (after 21 years of absence)
- Aerostar Bacău
  (after 1 year of absence)

=== From Liga III ===
Relegated to Liga IV

- Bradu Borca
  (ended 1-year stay)
- Balotești
  (ended 2-year stay)
- Industria Galda
  (ended 7-year stay)
- Fortuna Becicherecu Mic
  (ended 2-year stay)
- Mostiștea Ulmu
  (ended 2-year stay)
- Concordia II Chiajna
  (ended 1-year stay)
- Astra II
  (ended 7-year stay)
- Măgura Cisnădie
  (ended 1-year stay)
- Gaz Metan II Mediaș
  (ended 1-year stay)

Promoted to Liga II

- Dacia Unirea Brăila
  (ended 2-year stay)
- Steaua București
  (ended 1-year stay)
- Corona Brașov
  (ended 1-year stay)
- Viitorul Șelimbăr
  (ended 2-years stay)
- Unirea Dej
  (ended 14-years stay)

=== Renamed teams ===
CSO Cugir was renamed as Metalurgistul Cugir.

CSC Sânmartin was renamed as Lotus Băile Felix.

1. FC Gloria was renamed as Gloria Bistrița-Năsăud.

=== Excluded teams ===
Astra II, Gaz Metan II Mediaș, Concordia II Chiajna, Mostiștea Ulmu, Măgura Cisnădie, Avântul Valea Mărului, Axiopolis Cernavodă and Comuna Recea withdrew from the championship during the summer break.

=== Spared from relegation ===
Făurei, Universitatea II Craiova, Hermannstadt II and Minerul Costești were spared from relegation on the vacant places left by the excluded teams.

=== Enrolled teams ===
Argeș II Pitești, CFR II Cluj and Viitorul II Târgu Jiu were enrolled in the Liga III as the second teams of Liga I clubs Argeș Pitești and CFR Cluj, respectively the second team of Liga II side Viitorul Târgu Jiu, also on the vacant places left by the excluded teams.

Viitorul Cluj was enrolled directly in the third tier due to good results obtained in the youth leagues organized by the Romanian Football Federation.

== League map ==
Locations of Liga III clubs by series
Seria I Seria II Seria III Seria IV Seria V Seria VI Seria VII Seria VIII Seria IX Seria X
Locations of Liga III clubs from Bucharest and the vicinity
Seria 3 Seria 4

== Regular season ==
=== Seria I ===
Pos	Team	Pld	W	D	L	GF	GA	GD	Pts	Promotion or relegation
1	Dante Botoșani	18	12	4	2	25	10	+15	40	Qualification to Play-off round
2	Foresta Suceava	18	11	2	5	28	19	+9	35	Qualification to Play-off round
3	Bucovina Rădăuți	18	8	4	6	23	26	−3	28 (Note: Hușana Huși–Bucovina Rădăuți 0–0; Bucovina Rădăuți–Hușana Huși 3–2)	Qualification to Play-off round
4	Hușana Huși	18	8	4	6	21	18	+3	28	Qualification to Play-off round
5	Ceahlăul Piatra Neamț	18	7	6	5	21	12	+9	27	Qualification to Play-out round
6	Sporting Vaslui	18	6	6	6	22	16	+6	24 (Note: Sporting Vaslui–Șomuz Fălticeni 1–1; Șomuz Fălticeni–Sporting Vaslui 1–1)	Qualification to Play-out round
7	Șomuz Fălticeni	18	6	6	6	16	20	−4	24	Qualification to Play-out round
8	Știința Miroslava	18	5	5	8	18	21	−3	20	Qualification to Play-out round
9	CSM Bacău	18	4	5	9	17	28	−11	17	Qualification to Play-out round
10	Pașcani	18	0	4	14	17	38	−21	4	Qualification to Play-out round

Source: FRF (in Romanian), Soccerway
Rules for classification: 1) Points; 2) Head-to-head points; 3) Head-to-head goal difference; 4) Head-to-head goals scored; 5) Head-to-head away goals scored; 6) Goal difference; 7) Goals scored; 8)Play-off.

=== Seria II ===
Pos	Team	Pld	W	D	L	GF	GA	GD	Pts	Promotion or relegation
1	Oțelul Galați	18	15	1	2	54	10	+44	46	Qualification to Play-off round
2	Focșani	18	14	2	2	42	13	+29	44	Qualification to Play-off round
3	Metalul Buzău	18	10	3	5	43	19	+24	33	Qualification to Play-off round
4	Aerostar Bacău	18	9	4	5	32	19	+13	31	Qualification to Play-off round
5	Sporting Liești	18	9	1	8	31	25	+6	28 (Note: Sporting Liești–Viitorul Ianca 4–2; Viitorul Ianca–Sporting Liești 3–1)	Qualification to Play-out round
6	Viitorul Ianca	18	8	4	6	32	34	−2	28	Qualification to Play-out round
7	Râmnicu Sărat	18	8	3	7	40	24	+16	27	Qualification to Play-out round
8	Dinamo Bacău	18	4	2	12	20	43	−23	14	Qualification to Play-out round
9	Făurei	18	2	2	14	23	57	−34	8	Qualification to Play-out round
10	Sportul Chiscani	18	0	0	18	12	85	−73	0	Qualification to Play-out round

Source: FRF (in Romanian), Soccerway
Rules for classification: 1) Points; 2) Head-to-head points; 3) Head-to-head goal difference; 4) Head-to-head goals scored; 5) Head-to-head away goals scored; 6) Goal difference; 7) Goals scored; 8)Play-off.

=== Seria III ===
Pos	Team	Pld	W	D	L	GF	GA	GD	Pts	Promotion or relegation
1	Afumați	18	14	3	1	59	18	+41	45	Qualification to Play-off round
2	Popești-Leordeni	18	12	2	4	48	15	+33	38	Qualification to Play-off round
3	Farul II Constanța	18	10	3	5	47	17	+30	33 (Note: Farul II Constanța–Agricola Borcea 5–1; Agricola Borcea–Farul II Constanța 1–0)	Qualification to Play-off round
4	Agricola Borcea	18	10	3	5	29	30	−1	33	Qualification to Play-off round
5	Gloria Albești	18	9	1	8	19	26	−7	28	Qualification to Play-out round
6	Voluntari II	18	7	2	9	35	24	+11	23	Qualification to Play-out round
7	Înainte Modelu	18	6	3	9	26	30	−4	21	Qualification to Play-out round
8	Recolta Gheorghe Doja	18	6	2	10	23	42	−19	20	Qualification to Play-out round
9	Fetești	18	4	2	12	14	40	−26	14	Qualification to Play-out round
10	Oltenița	18	1	1	16	12	70	−58	4	Qualification to Play-out round

Source: FRF (in Romanian), Soccerway
Rules for classification: 1) Points; 2) Head-to-head points; 3) Head-to-head goal difference; 4) Head-to-head goals scored; 5) Head-to-head away goals scored; 6) Goal difference; 7) Goals scored; 8)Play-off.

=== Seria IV ===
Pos	Team	Pld	W	D	L	GF	GA	GD	Pts	Promotion or relegation
1	Progresul Spartac București	18	16	2	0	48	6	+42	50	Qualification to Play-off round
2	Tunari	18	12	3	3	36	16	+20	39	Qualification to Play-off round
3	Rapid II București	18	9	4	5	30	23	+7	31	Qualification to Play-off round
4	Unirea Bascov	18	7	5	6	21	22	−1	26	Qualification to Play-off round
5	FCSB II	18	6	6	6	32	27	+5	24	Qualification to Play-out round
6	Flacăra Moreni	18	6	5	7	23	34	−11	23	Qualification to Play-out round
7	Real Bradu	18	5	3	10	19	33	−14	18 (Note: Real Bradu–Dinamo II București 2–0; Dinamo II București–Real Bradu 3–1)	Qualification to Play-out round
8	Dinamo II București	18	5	3	10	26	36	−10	18	Qualification to Play-out round
9	Academica II Clinceni	18	3	5	10	17	30	−13	14	Qualification to Play-out round
10	Argeș II Pitești	18	1	4	13	12	37	−25	7	Qualification to Play-out round

Source: FRF (in Romanian), Soccerway
Rules for classification: 1) Points; 2) Head-to-head points; 3) Head-to-head goal difference; 4) Head-to-head goals scored; 5) Head-to-head away goals scored; 6) Goal difference; 7) Goals scored; 8)Play-off.

=== Seria V ===
Pos	Team	Pld	W	D	L	GF	GA	GD	Pts	Promotion or relegation
1	Odorheiu Secuiesc	18	13	2	3	39	14	+25	41	Qualification to Play-off round
2	Pucioasa	18	10	7	1	48	19	+29	37	Qualification to Play-off round
3	Olimpic Cetate Râșnov	18	8	5	5	26	21	+5	29 (Note: Sepsi OSK II–Olimpic Cetate Râșnov 2–1; Olimpic Cetate Râșnov–Sepsi OSK II 1–0)	Qualification to Play-off round
4	Sepsi OSK II	18	9	2	7	25	27	−2	29	Qualification to Play-off round
5	Blejoi	18	7	4	7	31	23	+8	25	Qualification to Play-out round
6	KSE Târgu Secuiesc	18	5	7	6	18	20	−2	22 (Note: Hermannstadt II–KSE Târgu Secuiesc 1–1; KSE Târgu Secuiesc–Hermannstadt II 0–0)	Qualification to Play-out round
7	Hermannstadt II	18	6	4	8	24	38	−14	22	Qualification to Play-out round
8	Plopeni	18	4	5	9	24	35	−11	17	Qualification to Play-out round
9	Kids Tâmpa Brașov	18	3	4	11	15	36	−21	13 (Note: SR Brașov–Kids Tâmpa Brașov 1–0; Kids Tâmpa Brașov–SR Brașov 2–0)	Qualification to Play-out round
10	SR Brașov	18	3	4	11	21	38	−17	13	Qualification to Play-out round

Source: FRF (in Romanian), Soccerway
Rules for classification: 1) Points; 2) Head-to-head points; 3) Head-to-head goal difference; 4) Head-to-head goals scored; 5) Head-to-head away goals scored; 6) Goal difference; 7) Goals scored; 8)Play-off.

=== Seria VI ===
Pos	Team	Pld	W	D	L	GF	GA	GD	Pts	Promotion or relegation
1	Slatina	18	12	5	1	40	9	+31	41	Qualification to Play-off round
2	Viitorul Dăești	18	12	3	3	30	14	+16	39	Qualification to Play-off round
3	Alexandria	18	10	3	5	27	17	+10	33	Qualification to Play-off round
4	Vedița Colonești	18	8	4	6	23	23	0	28	Qualification to Play-off round
5	Sporting Roșiori	18	6	7	5	27	25	+2	25 (Note: Sporting Roșiori–Filiași 2–2; Filiași–Sporting Roșiori 1–1)	Qualification to Play-out round
6	Filiași	18	7	4	7	27	27	0	25	Qualification to Play-out round
7	Petrolul Potcoava	18	6	3	9	22	28	−6	21	Qualification to Play-out round
8	Universitatea II Craiova	18	4	4	10	23	23	0	16 (Note: Universitatea II Craiova–Flacăra Horezu 1–0; Flacăra Horezu–Universitatea II Craiova 0–0)	Qualification to Play-out round
9	Flacăra Horezu	18	4	4	10	16	33	−17	16	Qualification to Play-out round
10	Minerul Costești	18	1	3	14	13	49	−36	6	Qualification to Play-out round

Source: FRF (in Romanian), Soccerway
Rules for classification: 1) Points; 2) Head-to-head points; 3) Head-to-head goal difference; 4) Head-to-head goals scored; 5) Head-to-head away goals scored; 6) Goal difference; 7) Goals scored; 8)Play-off.

=== Seria VII ===
Pos	Team	Pld	W	D	L	GF	GA	GD	Pts	Promotion or relegation
1	CSM Reșița	18	16	2	0	61	8	+53	50	Qualification to Play-off round
2	Deva	18	13	1	4	37	15	+22	40	Qualification to Play-off round
3	Voința Lupac	18	9	5	4	35	24	+11	32	Qualification to Play-off round
4	Pandurii Târgu Jiu	18	7	9	2	31	14	+17	30	Qualification to Play-off round
5	Viitorul Șimian	18	6	6	6	32	33	−1	24	Qualification to Play-out round
6	Jiul Petroșani	18	6	5	7	19	19	0	23	Qualification to Play-out round
7	Progresul Ezeriș	18	4	4	10	15	45	−30	16	Qualification to Play-out round
8	Gilortul Târgu Cărbunești	18	4	3	11	22	41	−19	15	Qualification to Play-out round
9	Viitorul II Târgu Jiu	18	3	4	11	13	41	−28	13	Qualification to Play-out round
10	Aurul Brad	18	1	3	14	13	38	−25	6	Qualification to Play-out round

Source: FRF (in Romanian), Soccerway
Rules for classification: 1) Points; 2) Head-to-head points; 3) Head-to-head goal difference; 4) Head-to-head goals scored; 5) Head-to-head away goals scored; 6) Goal difference; 7) Goals scored; 8)Play-off.

=== Seria VIII ===
Pos	Team	Pld	W	D	L	GF	GA	GD	Pts	Promotion or relegation
1	Ghiroda	16	12	2	2	36	12	+24	38	Qualification to Play-off round
2	Dumbrăvița	16	9	4	3	34	14	+20	31	Qualification to Play-off round
3	Crișul Chișineu-Criș	16	9	2	5	22	12	+10	29	Qualification to Play-off round
4	Șoimii Lipova	16	7	6	3	25	18	+7	27	Qualification to Play-off round
5	Progresul Pecica	16	4	7	5	17	22	−5	19 (Note: Progresul Pecica–Gloria Lunca-Teuz Cermei 1–1; Gloria Lunca-Teuz Cermei–Progresul Pecica 1–1)	Qualification to Play-out round
6	Gloria Lunca-Teuz Cermei	16	5	4	7	18	26	−8	19	Qualification to Play-out round
7	Pobeda Stár Bišnov	16	4	4	8	14	22	−8	16	Qualification to Play-out round
8	Frontiera Curtici	16	3	5	8	15	28	−13	14	Qualification to Play-out round
9	Avântul Periam	16	1	2	13	12	39	−27	5	Qualification to Play-out round
10	Poli Timișoara (E)	0	0	0	0	0	0	0	0 (Note: Poli Timișoara withdrew from Liga III after the 2nd round.)	Excluded

Source: FRF (in Romanian), Soccerway
Rules for classification: 1) Points; 2) Head-to-head points; 3) Head-to-head goal difference; 4) Head-to-head goals scored; 5) Head-to-head away goals scored; 6) Goal difference; 7) Goals scored; 8)Play-off.
(E) Eliminated

=== Seria IX ===
Pos	Team	Pld	W	D	L	GF	GA	GD	Pts	Promotion or relegation
1	Hunedoara	18	17	1	0	61	15	+46	52	Qualification to Play-off round
2	Metalurgistul Cugir	18	11	4	3	41	24	+17	37	Qualification to Play-off round
3	Unirea Ungheni	18	10	2	6	38	23	+15	32	Qualification to Play-off round
4	Viitorul Cluj	18	9	3	6	24	26	−2	30	Qualification to Play-off round
5	Gloria Bistrița-Năsăud	18	7	3	8	29	36	−7	24	Qualification to Play-out round
6	Ocna Mureș	18	5	5	8	24	35	−11	20	Qualification to Play-out round
7	Sănătatea Cluj	18	5	3	10	27	45	−18	18	Qualification to Play-out round
8	Sticla Arieșul Turda	18	4	3	11	23	30	−7	15 (Note: Avântul Reghin–Sticla Arieșul Turda 1–0; Sticla Arieșul Turda–Avântul Reghin 3–1)	Qualification to Play-out round
9	Avântul Reghin	18	3	6	9	17	28	−11	15	Qualification to Play-out round
10	Unirea Alba Iulia	18	3	2	13	11	33	−22	11	Qualification to Play-out round

Source: FRF (in Romanian), Soccerway
Rules for classification: 1) Points; 2) Head-to-head points; 3) Head-to-head goal difference; 4) Head-to-head goals scored; 5) Head-to-head away goals scored; 6) Goal difference; 7) Goals scored; 8)Play-off.

=== Seria X ===
Pos	Team	Pld	W	D	L	GF	GA	GD	Pts	Promotion or relegation
1	Minaur Baia Mare	18	13	3	2	57	20	+37	42	Qualification to Play-off round
2	CA Oradea	18	12	3	3	43	21	+22	39	Qualification to Play-off round
3	Someșul Dej	18	11	2	5	41	20	+21	35	Qualification to Play-off round
4	Lotus Băile Felix	18	8	5	5	38	23	+15	29	Qualification to Play-off round
5	SCM Zalău	18	9	1	8	44	35	+9	28	Qualification to Play-out round
6	Sportul Șimleu Silvaniei	18	6	5	7	21	31	−10	23	Qualification to Play-out round
7	CFR II Cluj	18	6	3	9	22	26	−4	21	Qualification to Play-out round
8	Satu Mare	18	4	6	8	24	33	−9	18	Qualification to Play-out round
9	Progresul Șomcuta Mare	18	4	5	9	26	40	−14	17	Qualification to Play-out round
10	Luceafărul Oradea	18	0	1	17	6	73	−67	−3 (Note: Luceafărul Oradea was deducted 4 points on the 1st of March 2022 after failing to pay players’ salaries.)	Qualification to Play-out round

Source: FRF (in Romanian), Soccerway
Rules for classification: 1) Points; 2) Head-to-head points; 3) Head-to-head goal difference; 4) Head-to-head goals scored; 5) Head-to-head away goals scored; 6) Goal difference; 7) Goals scored; 8)Play-off.

== Play-off round ==
=== Seria I ===
Pos	Team	Pld	W	D	L	GF	GA	GD	Pts	Promotion or relegation
1	Dante Botoșani (C, Q)	9	5	2	2	13	5	+8	57	Qualification to Promotion Play-offs
2	Foresta Suceava (Q)	9	5	3	1	18	5	+13	53	Qualification to Promotion Play-offs
3	Hușana Huși	9	2	4	3	7	13	−6	38	
4	Bucovina Rădăuți	9	0	3	6	5	20	−15	31	

Source: FRF (in Romanian), Soccerway
Rules for classification: 1) Points; 2) Points in the regular season; 3) Head-to-head points; 4) Head-to-head goal difference; 5) Head-to-head goals scored; 6) Head-to-head away goals scored; 7) Goal difference (regular season + play off); 8) Goals scored (regular season + play off); 9) Play-off.
(C) Champions; (Q) Qualified for the phase indicated

=== Seria II ===
Pos	Team	Pld	W	D	L	GF	GA	GD	Pts	Promotion or relegation
1	Oțelul Galați (C, Q)	9	8	0	1	20	4	+16	70	Qualification to Promotion Play-offs
2	Focșani (Q)	9	5	2	2	10	8	+2	61	Qualification to Promotion Play-offs
3	Aerostar Bacău	9	2	2	5	11	13	−2	39	
4	Metalul Buzău	9	1	0	8	8	24	−16	36	

Source: FRF (in Romanian), Soccerway
Rules for classification: 1) Points; 2) Points in the regular season; 3) Head-to-head points; 4) Head-to-head goal difference; 5) Head-to-head goals scored; 6) Head-to-head away goals scored; 7) Goal difference (regular season + play off); 8) Goals scored (regular season + play off); 9) Play-off.
(C) Champions; (Q) Qualified for the phase indicated

=== Seria III ===
Pos	Team	Pld	W	D	L	GF	GA	GD	Pts	Promotion or relegation
1	Afumați (C, Q)	9	8	0	1	40	9	+31	69	Qualification to Promotion Play-offs
2	Popești-Leordeni (Q)	9	4	1	4	23	19	+4	51	Qualification to Promotion Play-offs
3	Farul II Constanța	9	4	2	3	13	9	+4	47	
4	Agricola Borcea	9	0	1	8	3	42	−39	34	

Source: FRF (in Romanian), Soccerway
Rules for classification: 1) Points; 2) Points in the regular season; 3) Head-to-head points; 4) Head-to-head goal difference; 5) Head-to-head goals scored; 6) Head-to-head away goals scored; 7) Goal difference (regular season + play off); 8) Goals scored (regular season + play off); 9) Play-off.
(C) Champions; (Q) Qualified for the phase indicated

=== Seria IV ===
Pos	Team	Pld	W	D	L	GF	GA	GD	Pts	Promotion or relegation
1	Progresul Spartac București (C, Q)	9	3	4	2	16	11	+5	63	Qualification to Promotion Play-offs
2	Tunari (Q)	9	5	3	1	21	15	+6	57	Qualification to Promotion Play-offs
3	Rapid II București	9	3	1	5	18	19	−1	41	
4	Unirea Bascov	9	2	2	5	14	24	−10	34	

Source: FRF (in Romanian), Soccerway
Rules for classification: 1) Points; 2) Points in the regular season; 3) Head-to-head points; 4) Head-to-head goal difference; 5) Head-to-head goals scored; 6) Head-to-head away goals scored; 7) Goal difference (regular season + play off); 8) Goals scored (regular season + play off); 9) Play-off.
(C) Champions; (Q) Qualified for the phase indicated

=== Seria V ===
Pos	Team	Pld	W	D	L	GF	GA	GD	Pts	Promotion or relegation
1	Odorheiu Secuiesc (C, Q)	9	7	0	2	24	9	+15	62	Qualification to Promotion Play-offs
2	Pucioasa (Q)	9	5	1	3	13	16	−3	53	Qualification to Promotion Play-offs
3	Olimpic Cetate Râșnov	9	2	3	4	7	12	−5	38	
4	Sepsi OSK II	9	1	2	6	9	16	−7	34	

Source: FRF (in Romanian), Soccerway
Rules for classification: 1) Points; 2) Points in the regular season; 3) Head-to-head points; 4) Head-to-head goal difference; 5) Head-to-head goals scored; 6) Head-to-head away goals scored; 7) Goal difference (regular season + play off); 8) Goals scored (regular season + play off); 9) Play-off.
(C) Champions; (Q) Qualified for the phase indicated

=== Seria VI ===
Pos	Team	Pld	W	D	L	GF	GA	GD	Pts	Promotion or relegation
1	Slatina (C, Q)	9	5	2	2	12	8	+4	58	Qualification to Promotion Play-offs
2	Viitorul Dăești (Q)	9	4	1	4	10	12	−2	52	Qualification to Promotion Play-offs
3	Alexandria	9	6	1	2	17	7	+10	52	
4	Vedița Colonești	9	1	0	8	4	16	−12	31	

Source: FRF (in Romanian), Soccerway
Rules for classification: 1) Points; 2) Points in the regular season; 3) Head-to-head points; 4) Head-to-head goal difference; 5) Head-to-head goals scored; 6) Head-to-head away goals scored; 7) Goal difference (regular season + play off); 8) Goals scored (regular season + play off); 9) Play-off.
(C) Champions; (Q) Qualified for the phase indicated

=== Seria VII ===
Pos	Team	Pld	W	D	L	GF	GA	GD	Pts	Promotion or relegation
1	CSM Reșița (C, Q)	9	7	2	0	26	4	+22	73	Qualification to Promotion Play-offs
2	Deva (Q)	9	4	1	4	9	11	−2	53	Qualification to Promotion Play-offs
3	Voința Lupac	9	3	0	6	6	19	−13	41	
4	Pandurii Târgu Jiu	9	2	1	6	10	17	−7	37	

Source: FRF (in Romanian), Soccerway
Rules for classification: 1) Points; 2) Points in the regular season; 3) Head-to-head points; 4) Head-to-head goal difference; 5) Head-to-head goals scored; 6) Head-to-head away goals scored; 7) Goal difference (regular season + play off); 8) Goals scored (regular season + play off); 9) Play-off.
(C) Champions; (Q) Qualified for the phase indicated

=== Seria VIII ===
Pos	Team	Pld	W	D	L	GF	GA	GD	Pts	Promotion or relegation
1	Dumbrăvița (C, Q)	9	4	4	1	11	6	+5	47	Qualification to Promotion Play-offs
2	Ghiroda (Q)	9	1	5	3	8	11	−3	46	Qualification to Promotion Play-offs
3	Șoimii Lipova	9	3	4	2	11	9	+2	40	
4	Crișul Chișineu-Criș	9	1	5	3	5	9	−4	37	

Source: FRF (in Romanian), Soccerway
Rules for classification: 1) Points; 2) Points in the regular season; 3) Head-to-head points; 4) Head-to-head goal difference; 5) Head-to-head goals scored; 6) Head-to-head away goals scored; 7) Goal difference (regular season + play off); 8) Goals scored (regular season + play off); 9) Play-off.
(C) Champions; (Q) Qualified for the phase indicated

=== Seria IX ===
Pos	Team	Pld	W	D	L	GF	GA	GD	Pts	Promotion or relegation
1	Hunedoara (C, Q)	9	6	3	0	26	10	+16	73	Qualification to Promotion Play-offs
2	Metalurgistul Cugir (Q)	9	4	2	3	18	13	+5	51	Qualification to Promotion Play-offs
3	Unirea Ungheni	9	2	4	3	15	18	−3	42	
4	Viitorul Cluj	9	1	1	7	7	25	−18	34	

Source: FRF (in Romanian), Soccerway
Rules for classification: 1) Points; 2) Points in the regular season; 3) Head-to-head points; 4) Head-to-head goal difference; 5) Head-to-head goals scored; 6) Head-to-head away goals scored; 7) Goal difference (regular season + play off); 8) Goals scored (regular season + play off); 9) Play-off.
(C) Champions; (Q) Qualified for the phase indicated

=== Seria X ===
Pos	Team	Pld	W	D	L	GF	GA	GD	Pts	Promotion or relegation
1	Minaur Baia Mare (C, Q)	9	5	1	3	15	8	+7	58	Qualification to Promotion Play-offs
2	CA Oradea (Q)	9	5	0	4	9	7	+2	54	Qualification to Promotion Play-offs
3	Lotus Băile Felix	9	5	1	3	9	11	−2	45	
4	Someșul Dej	9	1	2	6	4	11	−7	40	

Source: FRF (in Romanian), Soccerway
Rules for classification: 1) Points; 2) Points in the regular season; 3) Head-to-head points; 4) Head-to-head goal difference; 5) Head-to-head goals scored; 6) Head-to-head away goals scored; 7) Goal difference (regular season + play off); 8) Goals scored (regular season + play off); 9) Play-off.
(C) Champions; (Q) Qualified for the phase indicated

== Play-out round ==
=== Seria I ===
Pos	Team	Pld	W	D	L	GF	GA	GD	Pts	Promotion or relegation
5	Ceahlăul Piatra Neamț	10	7	3	0	17	3	+14	51	
6	Șomuz Fălticeni	10	4	5	1	15	8	+7	41	
7	Sporting Vaslui	10	3	4	3	11	10	+1	37	
8	Știința Miroslava (O)	10	3	2	5	10	14	−4	31	Possible Relegation to Liga IV
9	CSM Bacău (R)	10	2	5	3	5	9	−4	28	Relegation to Liga IV
10	Pașcani (R)	10	1	1	8	4	18	−14	8	Relegation to Liga IV

Source: FRF (in Romanian), Soccerway
Rules for classification: 1) Points; 2) Points in the regular season; 3) Head-to-head points; 4) Head-to-head goal difference; 5) Head-to-head goals scored; 6) Head-to-head away goals scored; 7) Goal difference (regular season + play out); 8) Goals scored (regular season + play out); 9) Play-off.
(O) Play-off winners; (R) Relegated

=== Seria II ===
Pos	Team	Pld	W	D	L	GF	GA	GD	Pts	Promotion or relegation
5	Sporting Liești	10	7	2	1	28	9	+19	51	
6	Viitorul Ianca	10	5	2	3	20	19	+1	45	
7	Râmnicu Sărat	10	3	1	6	14	14	0	37	
8	Dinamo Bacău (O)	10	7	1	2	25	13	+12	36	Possible Relegation to Liga IV
9	Făurei (R)	10	2	0	8	7	27	−20	14	Relegation to Liga IV
10	Sportul Chiscani (R)	10	3	0	7	14	26	−12	9	Relegation to Liga IV

Source: FRF (in Romanian), Soccerway
Rules for classification: 1) Points; 2) Points in the regular season; 3) Head-to-head points; 4) Head-to-head goal difference; 5) Head-to-head goals scored; 6) Head-to-head away goals scored; 7) Goal difference (regular season + play out); 8) Goals scored (regular season + play out); 9) Play-off.
(O) Play-off winners; (R) Relegated

=== Seria III ===
Pos	Team	Pld	W	D	L	GF	GA	GD	Pts	Promotion or relegation
5	Gloria Albești	10	6	1	3	26	16	+10	47	
6	Voluntari II	10	6	1	3	26	13	+13	42	
7	Recolta Gheorghe Doja	10	6	2	2	23	11	+12	40	
8	Înainte Modelu (O)	10	5	1	4	18	24	−6	37	Possible Relegation to Liga IV
9	Fetești (R)	10	1	5	4	8	16	−8	22	Relegation to Liga IV
10	Oltenița (R)	10	0	2	8	8	29	−21	6	Relegation to Liga IV

Source: FRF (in Romanian), Soccerway
Rules for classification: 1) Points; 2) Points in the regular season; 3) Head-to-head points; 4) Head-to-head goal difference; 5) Head-to-head goals scored; 6) Head-to-head away goals scored; 7) Goal difference (regular season + play out); 8) Goals scored (regular season + play out); 9) Play-off.
(O) Play-off winners; (R) Relegated

=== Seria IV ===
Pos	Team	Pld	W	D	L	GF	GA	GD	Pts	Promotion or relegation
5	FCSB II	10	7	0	3	27	12	+15	45	
6	Flacăra Moreni	10	7	0	3	21	12	+9	44	
7	Real Bradu	10	6	1	3	20	17	+3	37	
8	Academica II Clinceni (O)	10	5	1	4	12	12	0	30	Possible Relegation to Liga IV
9	Dinamo II București (R)	10	1	1	8	13	34	−21	22	Relegation to Liga IV
10	Argeș II Pitești (R)	10	2	1	7	14	20	−6	14	Relegation to Liga IV

Source: FRF (in Romanian), Soccerway
Rules for classification: 1) Points; 2) Points in the regular season; 3) Head-to-head points; 4) Head-to-head goal difference; 5) Head-to-head goals scored; 6) Head-to-head away goals scored; 7) Goal difference (regular season + play out); 8) Goals scored (regular season + play out); 9) Play-off.
(O) Play-off winners; (R) Relegated

=== Seria V ===
Pos	Team	Pld	W	D	L	GF	GA	GD	Pts	Promotion or relegation
5	Blejoi	10	4	1	5	18	15	+3	38	
6	KSE Târgu Secuiesc	10	5	1	4	12	11	+1	38	
7	Plopeni	10	5	2	3	13	9	+4	34	
8	SR Brașov (O)	10	6	1	3	13	10	+3	32	Possible Relegation to Liga IV
9	Hermannstadt II (R)	10	2	2	6	8	17	−9	30	Relegation to Liga IV
10	Kids Tâmpa Brașov (R)	10	4	1	5	14	16	−2	26	Relegation to Liga IV

Source: FRF (in Romanian), Soccerway
Rules for classification: 1) Points; 2) Points in the regular season; 3) Head-to-head points; 4) Head-to-head goal difference; 5) Head-to-head goals scored; 6) Head-to-head away goals scored; 7) Goal difference (regular season + play out); 8) Goals scored (regular season + play out); 9) Play-off.
(O) Play-off winners; (R) Relegated

=== Seria VI ===
Pos	Team	Pld	W	D	L	GF	GA	GD	Pts	Promotion or relegation
5	Filiași	10	4	5	1	19	13	+6	42	
6	Sporting Roșiori	10	4	2	4	20	22	−2	39	
7	Universitatea II Craiova	10	6	1	3	26	15	+11	35	
8	Petrolul Potcoava (O)	10	3	3	4	12	17	−5	33	Possible Relegation to Liga IV
9	Flacăra Horezu (R)	10	2	3	5	9	14	−5	25	Relegation to Liga IV
10	Minerul Costești (R)	10	3	2	5	16	21	−5	17	Relegation to Liga IV

Source: FRF (in Romanian), Soccerway
Rules for classification: 1) Points; 2) Points in the regular season; 3) Head-to-head points; 4) Head-to-head goal difference; 5) Head-to-head goals scored; 6) Head-to-head away goals scored; 7) Goal difference (regular season + play out); 8) Goals scored (regular season + play out); 9) Play-off.
(O) Play-off winners; (R) Relegated

=== Seria VII ===
Pos	Team	Pld	W	D	L	GF	GA	GD	Pts	Promotion or relegation
5	Viitorul Șimian	10	7	2	1	25	7	+18	47	
6	Gilortul Târgu Cărbunești	10	5	1	4	12	13	−1	31	
7	Jiul Petroșani	10	2	1	7	10	20	−10	30	
8	Aurul Brad (R)	10	7	1	2	16	8	+8	28	Possible Relegation to Liga IV
9	Progresul Ezeriș (R)	10	3	1	6	12	15	−3	26	Relegation to Liga IV
10	Viitorul II Târgu Jiu (R)	10	2	2	6	6	18	−12	21	Relegation to Liga IV

Source: FRF (in Romanian), Soccerway
Rules for classification: 1) Points; 2) Points in the regular season; 3) Head-to-head points; 4) Head-to-head goal difference; 5) Head-to-head goals scored; 6) Head-to-head away goals scored; 7) Goal difference (regular season + play out); 8) Goals scored (regular season + play out); 9) Play-off.
(R) Relegated

=== Seria VIII ===
Pos	Team	Pld	W	D	L	GF	GA	GD	Pts	Promotion or relegation
5	Gloria Lunca-Teuz Cermei	8	2	3	3	14	13	+1	28	
6	Progresul Pecica	8	2	2	4	14	22	−8	27	
7	Pobeda Stár Bišnov	8	2	3	3	10	10	0	25	
8	Avântul Periam (O)	8	6	1	1	18	11	+7	24	Possible Relegation to Liga IV
9	Frontiera Curtici (R)	8	1	5	2	16	16	0	22	Relegation to Liga IV
10	Poli Timișoara (Note: Poli Timișoara withdrew in the first part of the season and all its results were cancelled.) (E)	0	0	0	0	0	0	0	0	Excluded

Source: FRF (in Romanian), Soccerway
Rules for classification: 1) Points; 2) Points in the regular season; 3) Head-to-head points; 4) Head-to-head goal difference; 5) Head-to-head goals scored; 6) Head-to-head away goals scored; 7) Goal difference (regular season + play out); 8) Goals scored (regular season + play out); 9) Play-off.
(E) Eliminated; (O) Play-off winners; (R) Relegated

=== Seria IX ===
Pos	Team	Pld	W	D	L	GF	GA	GD	Pts	Promotion or relegation
5	Gloria Bistrița-Năsăud	10	6	1	3	33	19	+14	43	
6	Sănătatea Cluj	10	5	1	4	31	26	+5	34	
7	Ocna Mureș	10	3	1	6	14	26	−12	30	
8	Avântul Reghin (O)	10	4	3	3	18	15	+3	30	Possible Relegation to Liga IV
9	Unirea Alba Iulia (R)	10	4	4	2	20	22	−2	27	Relegation to Liga IV
10	Sticla Arieșul Turda (R)	10	3	0	7	28	36	−8	24	Relegation to Liga IV

Source: FRF (in Romanian), Soccerway
Rules for classification: 1) Points; 2) Points in the regular season; 3) Head-to-head points; 4) Head-to-head goal difference; 5) Head-to-head goals scored; 6) Head-to-head away goals scored; 7) Goal difference (regular season + play out); 8) Goals scored (regular season + play out); 9) Play-off.
(O) Play-off winners; (R) Relegated

=== Seria X ===
Pos	Team	Pld	W	D	L	GF	GA	GD	Pts	Promotion or relegation
5	SCM Zalău	10	6	1	3	38	15	+23	47	
6	Sportul Șimleu Silvaniei	10	5	2	3	21	19	+2	40	
7	CFR II Cluj	10	5	4	1	27	15	+12	40	
8	Satu Mare (O)	10	7	1	2	32	14	+18	40	Possible Relegation to Liga IV
9	Progresul Șomcuta Mare (R)	10	2	0	8	14	22	−8	23	Relegation to Liga IV
10	Luceafărul Oradea (R)	10	0	2	8	7	54	−47	−9 (Note: Luceafărul Oradea was deducted 11 points after failing to pay players’ salaries.)	Relegation to Liga IV

Source: FRF (in Romanian), Soccerway
Rules for classification: 1) Points; 2) Points in the regular season; 3) Head-to-head points; 4) Head-to-head goal difference; 5) Head-to-head goals scored; 6) Head-to-head away goals scored; 7) Goal difference (regular season + play out); 8) Goals scored (regular season + play out); 9) Play-off.
(O) Play-off winners; (R) Relegated

== Promotion play-offs ==
The promotion play-offs are disputed between the first two teams from each of the ten play-off round series. Only the best five teams will be promoted to 2022–23 Liga II.

=== First round ===
Team 1	Agg.	Team 2	1st leg	2nd leg
Focșani	1–2	Dante Botoșani	0–0	1–2 (a.e.t.)
Foresta Suceava	0–3	Oțelul Galați	0–1	0–2
Tunari	5–2	Afumați	3–2	2–0
Popești-Leordeni	1–2	Progresul Spartac București	0–1	1–1
Viitorul Dăești	0–2	Odorheiu Secuiesc	0–1	0–1
Pucioasa	0–4	Slatina	0–2	0–2
Ghiroda	1–2	CSM Reșița	0–1	1–1
Deva	4–6	Dumbrăvița	1–5	3–1
CA Oradea	2–4	Hunedoara	2–4	0–0
Metalurgistul Cugir	2–7	Minaur Baia Mare	0–4	2–3

25 May 2022	Focșani	0–0	Dante Botoșani	Focșani
18:00 EEST (UTC+3)		Report		Stadium: Milcovul; Attendance: 3,000; Referee: Vlad Baban (Iași)

25 May 2022	Foresta Suceava	0–1	Oțelul Galați	Suceava
18:00 EEST (UTC+3)		Report	Nica 40'	Stadium: Areni; Attendance: 3,000; Referee: Marius Omuț (Satu Mare)

25 May 2022	Tunari	3–2	Afumați	Tunari
18:00 EEST (UTC+3)	Tudose 21'; Stoian 56'; Mihai 70'	Report	Buduroi 34'; Bălan 41'	Stadium: Comunal; Attendance: 500; Referee: Valentin Porumbel (Oltenița)

25 May 2022	Popești-Leordeni	0–1	Progresul Spartac București	Popești-Leordeni
18:00 EEST (UTC+3)		Report	Andrei 58'	Stadium: Inter Gaz; Attendance: 500; Referee: Ionuț Coza (Cernica)

25 May 2022	Viitorul Dăești	0–1	Odorheiu Secuiesc	Râmnicu Vâlcea
18:00 EEST (UTC+3)		Report	Guță 57'	Stadium: Municipal; Attendance: 3,000; Referee: Ovidiu Robu (Chitila)

25 May 2022	Pucioasa	0–2	Slatina	Pucioasa
18:00 EEST (UTC+3)		Report	Doman 38'; Popovici 87'	Stadium: Dumitru Tică Popescu; Attendance: 600; Referee: Cătălin Buși (Râmnicu Vâlcea)

25 May 2022	Ghiroda	0–1	CSM Reșița	Ghiroda
18:00 EEST (UTC+3)		Report	Jorza 49'	Stadium: Emilian Pavel; Attendance: 1,500; Referee: Mircea Ardelean (Arad)

25 May 2022	Deva	1–5	Dumbrăvița	Orăștie
18:00 EEST (UTC+3)	Stelea 45+1'	Report	Bain 18'; Paulevici 47', 51'; Zurbagiu 58'; Bodri 72'	Stadium: Dacia; Attendance: 500; Referee: Rareș Vidican (Satu Mare)

25 May 2022	CA Oradea	2–4	Hunedoara	Oradea
18:00 EEST (UTC+3)	Cîrjan 25' (pen.); Ion 90+2'	Report	Trășcan 10'; Arnăutu 47'; Bradu 49'; Roșu 70'	Stadium: Iuliu Bodola; Attendance: 4,000; Referee: Ovidiu Mazilu (Satu Mare)

25 May 2022	Metalurgistul Cugir	0–4	Minaur Baia Mare	Cugir
18:00 EEST (UTC+3)		Report	Simion 14'; Chinde 21'; Gneba 32'; Stănescu 73'	Stadium: Arena Cugir; Attendance: 800; Referee: Andrei Țiții (Șura Mică)

28 May 2022	Dante Botoșani	2–1 (a.e.t.)	Focșani	Bucecea
17:30 EEST (UTC+3)	Gorovei 7'; Codău 109'	Report	Dascălu 14'	Stadium: Bucecea; Attendance: 500; Referee: Szabolcs Kovács (Carei)

28 May 2022	Oțelul Galați	2–0	Foresta Suceava	Galați
17:30 EEST (UTC+3)	Cisotti 43'; Nistor 77'	Report		Stadium: Oțelul; Attendance: 6,500; Referee: Cristian Moldoveanu (Sfântu Gheorghe)

28 May 2022	Afumați	0–2	Tunari	Afumați
17:30 EEST (UTC+3)		Report	V. Mihai 44'; M. Mihai 90+5'	Stadium: Comunal; Attendance: 200; Referee: Lucian Rusandu (Sfântu Gheorghe)

28 May 2022	Progresul Spartac București	1–1	Popești-Leordeni	Bucharest
17:30 EEST (UTC+3)	Costea 69'	Report	Niculae 78'	Stadium: Progresul Spartac; Attendance: 500; Referee: Andrei Antonie (Bucharest)

28 May 2022	Odorheiu Secuiesc	1–0	Viitorul Dăești	Odorheiu Secuiesc
17:30 EEST (UTC+3)	Bobea 89'	Report	3,000	Stadium: Municipal; Referee: Eduard Ioniță (Galați)

28 May 2022	Slatina	2–0	Pucioasa	Slatina
17:30 EEST (UTC+3)	Toma 10'; Neicu 69'	Report		Stadium: 1 Mai; Attendance: 1,500; Referee: Valentin Naidin (Turnu Măgurele)

28 May 2022	CSM Reșița	1–1	Ghiroda	Reșița
17:30 EEST (UTC+3)	Breșneni 68'	Report	Trandu 41'	Stadium: Mircea Chivu; Attendance: 3,500; Referee: Vladimir Nagy (Măhăceni)

28 May 2022	Dumbrăvița	1–3	Deva	Dumbrăvița
17:30 EEST (UTC+3)	Olaru 31'	Report	Avramovici 80', 83'; Bloj 90+3'	Stadium: Ștefan Dobay; Attendance: 500; Referee: Sorin Vădana (Cluj-Napoca)

28 May 2022	Hunedoara	0–0	CA Oradea	Hunedoara
17:30 EEST (UTC+3)		Report		Stadium: Michael Klein; Attendance: 3,000; Referee: Marius Chioran (Florești)

28 May 2022	Minaur Baia Mare	3–2	Metalurgistul Cugir	Baia Mare
17:30 EEST (UTC+3)	Văsălie 47'; Stanciu 75', 90'	Report	Udrea 6'; Vlădia 74'	Stadium: Viorel Mateianu; Attendance: 200; Referee: Răzvan Lădar (Zalău)

=== Second round ===
Team 1	Agg.	Team 2	1st leg	2nd leg
Dante Botoșani	1–4	Oțelul Galați	1–1	0–3
Tunari	1–7	Progresul Spartac București	0–4	1–3
Slatina	1–1 (a.e.t.) (4–3 p)	Odorheiu Secuiesc	0–0	1–1 (a.e.t.) (4–3 p)
Dumbrăvița	1–1 (a.e.t.) (4–2 p)	CSM Reșița	0–0	1–1 (a.e.t.) (4–2 p)
Hunedoara	3–5	Minaur Baia Mare	2–1	1–4

4 June 2022	Tunari	0–4	Progresul Spartac București	Tunari
16:00 EEST (UTC+3)		Report	Costea 43', 45'; Lixandru 53'; Ohaci 79'	Stadium: Comunal; Attendance: 600; Referee: Andrei Moroiță (Ploiești)

4 June 2022	Slatina	0–0	Odorheiu Secuiesc	Slatina
16:00 EEST (UTC+3)		Report		Stadium: 1 Mai; Attendance: 3,500; Referee: Cătălin Popa (Pitești)

4 June 2022	Hunedoara	2–1	Minaur Baia Mare	Hunedoara
16:00 EEST (UTC+3)	Arnăutu 15'; Mogoș 89'	Report	Jairo 12' (o.g.)	Stadium: Michael Klein; Attendance: 10,000; Referee: Horia Mladinovici (Bucharest)

4 June 2022	Dante Botoșani	1–1	Oțelul Galați	Botoșani
18:00 EEST (UTC+3)	Codău 44'		Yabré 51'	Stadium: Municipal; Attendance: 500; Referee: Cătălin Buși (Râmnicu Vâlcea)

4 June 2022	Dumbrăvița	0–0	CSM Reșița	Dumbrăvița
18:00 EEST (UTC+3)				Stadium: Ștefan Dobay; Attendance: 1,000; Referee: Robert Avram (Piteşti)

8 June 2022	Oțelul Galați	3–0	Dante Botoșani	Galați
17:30 EEST (UTC+3)	Cârjan 45+2'; Nica 50'; Cireș 73'	Report		Stadium: Oțelul; Referee: Ionuț Coza (Cernica)

8 June 2022	Progresul Spartac București	3–1	Tunari	Bucharest
17:30 EEST (UTC+3)	Parfeon 7'; S. Matei 40'; A. Matei 88'	Report	Mihai 29'	Stadium: Progresul Spartac; Referee: Sorin Vădana (Cluj-Napoca)

8 June 2022	Odorheiu Secuiesc	1–1 (a.e.t.) (3–4 p)	Slatina	Odorheiu Secuiesc
17:30 EEST (UTC+3)	Simó 3'	Report	Trancă 45+3'	Stadium: Municipal; Referee: Florin Andrei (Târgu Mureș)
	Penalties
	Kilyén (penalty missed); Mitra (penalty scored); Criștiu (penalty missed); Berkeczi (penalty scored); Botorok (penalty scored)		Toma (penalty scored); Cincă (penalty scored); Popovici (penalty missed); Sălcianu (penalty scored); Necșulescu (penalty scored)

8 June 2022	CSM Reșița	1–1 (a.e.t.) (2–4 p)	Dumbrăvița	Reșița
17:30 EEST (UTC+3)	Drăghiceanu 86'	Report	Olaru 50'	Stadium: Mircea Chivu; Referee: Andrei Antonie (Bucharest)
	Penalties
	Cioinac (penalty scored); Drăghiceanu (penalty scored); Cristea (penalty missed); Munteanu (penalty missed)		Făgărășanu (penalty scored); Ghinescu (penalty scored); Olaru (penalty scored); Gologan (penalty scored)

8 June 2022	Minaur Baia Mare	4–1	Hunedoara	Baia Mare
17:30 EEST (UTC+3)	Ciocan 25', 30'; Mondragón 45+2'; Stanciu 90+4' (pen.)	Report	Jairo 37'	Stadium: Viorel Mateianu; Referee: Vlad Băban (Iași)

== Possible relegation ==
At the end of the season, a special table was made between 8th places from the 10 series. The last team in this table was also relegated in the Liga IV. In this table, 8th place teams are included without the points obtained against teams that relegated in their series.

Pos	Team	Pld	W	D	L	GF	GA	GD	Pts	Relegation
1	Petrolul Potcoava	6	2	2	2	7	10	−3	29	
2	Satu Mare	6	3	1	2	12	11	+1	28	
3	Știința Miroslava	6	2	1	3	8	11	−3	27	
4	Înainte Modelu	6	2	0	4	10	19	−9	27	
5	SR Brașov	6	4	1	1	8	6	+2	26	
6	Dinamo Bacău	6	3	1	2	10	8	+2	24	
7	Avântul Periam	6	6	0	0	15	7	+8	23	
8	Academica II Clinceni	6	3	0	3	7	8	−1	23	
9	Avântul Reghin	6	2	1	3	11	11	0	22	
10	Aurul Brad (R)	6	4	0	2	10	7	+3	18	Relegation to Liga IV

Source: FRF (in Romanian)
Rules for classification: 1) Points; 2) Goal difference; 3) Goals scored.
(R) Relegated
