= CS Tunari =

Association football club in Romania

- Full name: Club Sportiv Tunari
- Nicknames: Tunarii (The Gunners); Arsenal
- Short name: Tunari
- Founded: 1980; 46 years ago as Arsenal Tunari
- Ground: Central
- Capacity: 1,700
- Owner: Tunari Commune
- Chairman: Florin Vlădilă
- Head coach: vacant
- League: Liga III
- 2025–26: Liga II; Regular season: 20th of 22; Play-out, Group B: 8th (relegated)
- Website: https://cstunari.ro/
Home colours	Away colours

Club Sportiv Tunari, commonly known as CS Tunari, or simply as Tunari, is a Romanian professional football club based in Tunari, Ilfov County, currently competing in Liga III, the third tier of the Romanian football.

Founded in 1980 as Arsenal Tunari, the club was renamed CS Tunari in 2004 and gradually consolidated its place in Romania's third tier, achieving its first promotion to the second tier in 2023. However, it became a yo-yo club, being relegated after just one season, before returning to the second tier the following season, only to be relegated again in 2026.

== History ==
=== Foundation and naming (1980–2004) ===
CS Tunari was founded in 1980 under the name Arsenal Tunari. The name "Tunari" translates to "Gunners" in Romanian, and the commune’s coat of arms features a cannon—elements that inspired the original name as a tribute to the English football club Arsenal F.C. and its nickname, "The Gunners." In its early years, Arsenal Tunari played consistently in the Ilfov County Championships, the fourth tier of Romanian football league system. The club changed its name in 2004 after being forced to drop “Arsenal” due to copyright restrictions.

In a 2009 interview with sport.ro, club chairman Lucian Costache recounted an anecdote from 1996, when the club—still known as Arsenal Tunari—sent a letter to Arsenal F.C. requesting official kits, but no response was received. Around this period, a new stadium was built in the commune near Bucharest, and in 2009 the club secured a place in Romania's third division.

=== Establishing in Liga III (2009–2018) ===
Over the years, CS Tunari has established itself as a consistent presence at the third tier, gradually improving its performances. The 2009–10 season ended with a 9th-place finish under the guidance of Ion Ion. The following season, Virgil Nițoi led the team to 7th place. Challenging years unfolded under Ion Voicu's leadership, with the team finishing 10th in 2011–12 and slipping to 13th in 2012–13, before Florin Vlădilă stepped in to take charge in December 2012.

From the summer of 2013 onward, with Virgil Nițoi returning, significant progress became evident. The club finished 8th in the 2013–14 season and climbed to 4th in the 2014–15 season. A tough 2015–16 campaign saw a drop to 12th under coach Florin Bratu, who replaced Nițoi after the team lost its first six matches of the season. Bratu departed the following summer and was succeeded by Tudorel Dumitru, who led the team to its best-ever finish at the time, securing 3rd place in the 2016–17 season, followed by a solid 7th-place finish in the 2017–18 season.

During this period, CS Tunari also updated its branding and logo in 2018, adopting a red-and-white color scheme instead of the previous red-and-blue combination. The new emblem briefly reintroduced the name “Arsenal,” though the official club name remained CS Tunari.

Ștefan Odoroabă coached the team for the next three and a half seasons, achieving a 6th-place finish in the 2018–19 season, 4th in the 2019–20 season, and 5th in the 2020–21 season. Odoroabă left Tunari in March 2022 and was replaced by Marcel Abăluță, who led the team to an impressive 2nd place in the 2021–22 season, qualifying for the promotion play-offs. After eliminating CS Afumați in the first round 5–2 on aggregate (3–2 at home and 2–0 away), the team lost the promotion in the second round to Progresul Spartac București, 1–7 on aggregate (0–4 at home and 1–3 away).

=== Rise, relegation and return ===
In the 2022–23 season, Valentin Negru was appointed as the new head coach, but he left the club in November, with the team in 1st place. Assistant coach Alin Ilin took charge for the rest of the year. Gabriel Manu was hired in January 2023, leading the team to its first-ever promotion to Liga II. The Gunners ended the season in 1st place in Series IV, nine points ahead of Popești-Leordeni. The promotion play-offs began with Farul Constanța II being eliminated (1–3 away and 4–0 at home), followed by a victory over Popești-Leordeni (1–2 away and 3–1 at home) in the final stage.

In June 2023, Tunari appointed Florin Stângă as head coach, just two days after unexpectedly parting ways with Gabriel Manu. Stângă led the team for six rounds before Ștefan Odoroabă replaced interim coach Alin Ilin in October 2023. The Gunners finished 17th in the regular season of 2023–24 season and were placed in Group B of the play-out under the guidance of Dan Alexa, who replaced Odoroabă in March 2024. However, multiple changes in the squad and coaching staff led to relegation, with Tunari finishing second to last in the group. Tunari also qualified for the group stage of Cupa României after a 5–0 victory over third-division side Viitorul Ianca. The group stage featured matches against Universitatea Craiova (1–1), Voluntari (1–1), and Gloria Buzău (1–1), ending in 5th place out of 6 in Group D, resulting in elimination.

Tunari, coached by Dan Alexa, won Series V of the 2024–25 season, qualified for the promotion play-off, and in the semi-finals the Ilfov-based side advanced without playing after Băicoi was declared ineligible for participation. In the final promotion play-off round, they defeated Odorheiu Secuiesc 4–0 in the first leg and secured a 1–1 draw in the return leg, thus earning immediate promotion back to the second tier, with a squad that included Moroz, Ahmed, I. Croitoru, Șerban, Furtună, Tudorache, Vasu, Moga, Gavrilă, Lupescu, Jerky Song, Ion, Țegle, Dragu, Filip, Hlistei, Spătaru, R. Paul, Bălan, and Pumbuitu.

Following the departure of Dan Alexa shortly before the start of the 2025–26 Liga II season, CS Tunari appointed Bogdan Pătrașcu as head coach, but after seven rounds and only six points he was dismissed, after which assistant Alin Ilin had a short interim spell before Dinu Todoran was appointed in November. Todoran led the team to a 20th-place finish in the regular season, but resigned after the second round of the play-out. He was replaced by Paul Pîrvulescu, who finished the season in last place in Group B, resulting in relegation back to the third tier.

== Ground ==
Comunal Stadium in 2022

CS Tunari plays its home matches on the Comunal Stadium in Tunari, with a capacity of 1,000 seats. The stadium was renovated and expanded in 2004 for the sum of 400,000 lei, at that time approximately 84,000 €. In 2017 the stadium was renovated again and the pitch was changed.

During the 2023–24 season, Tunari Stadium underwent renovations, prompting the team to relocate their matches to the Central Stadium of the Romanian National Football Centre.

== Honours ==
- Liga III
  - Winners (2): 2022–23, 2024–25
  - Runners-up (1): 2021–22

== Players ==
=== First team squad ===
As of 25 January 2026

Note: Flags indicate national team as defined under FIFA eligibility rules; some limited exceptions apply. Players may hold more than one non-FIFA nationality.

No.	Pos.	Nation	Player
1	GK	ROU	Sebastian Moroz
2	DF	ROU	Alexandru Stănică (on loan from Petrolul Ploiești)
3	DF	ROU	Ionuț Panțîru
4	DF	ROU	Denis Ispas
5	MF	ROU	Vlad Tudorache
6	MF	ROU	Levente Bara
7	MF	ROU	Alin Calotă
8	MF	ESP	Fran Callejón
9	FW	ROU	Adrian Bălan (3rd captain)
10	FW	ROU	Claudiu Dragu (Captain)
11	MF	ROU	Robert Mustacă
12	GK	ROU	Emanuel Breban
15	FW	ROU	Raul Stanciu (on loan from Rapid București)
16	DF	ROU	Laurențiu Hagiu

No.	Pos.	Nation	Player
17	DF	ROU	Robert Răducioiu
18	DF	ROU	Alexandru Trifan
19	FW	ROU	Răzvan Dumitru
20	DF	ESP	Xavi Estacio
21	MF	ROU	George Gogescu
22	MF	ROU	Vladimir Badea (on loan from Petrolul Ploiești)
27	MF	ROU	Lucian Ion (Vice-captain)
28	DF	ROU	Denis Pîrcălabu (on loan from Steaua București)
29	MF	ROU	Neluț Roșu
30	MF	ROU	Eduard Moga (on loan from Universitatea Cluj)
44	DF	MDA	Denis Furtună
93	FW	ROU	Vlad Filip
94	MF	ROU	Nicholas Csampar

=== Out on loan ===
Note: Flags indicate national team as defined under FIFA eligibility rules; some limited exceptions apply. Players may hold more than one non-FIFA nationality.

No.	Pos.	Nation	Player
—	FW	ROU	Bogdan Tănase (to Cetatea Turnu Măgurele)

== Club officials ==
=== Board of directors ===
Name	Period
Owner	(Romania) Tunari Commune
President	(Romania) Florin Vladila
Economic Director	(Romania) Mihaela Pavel
Sporting director	(Romania) Laurențiu Vlădilă

=== Current technical staff ===
Name	Period
Head coach	vacant
Assistant coach	(Romania) Alin Ilin
Goalkeeping coach	(Romania) Corneliu Fulga
Fitness coach	vacant
Club Doctor	(Romania) Diana Arpenti

== Notable former players ==
The footballers enlisted below have had international cap(s) for their respective countries at junior and/or senior level and/or significant caps for CS Tunari.

Romania

- (Romania) Marius Ardeleanu
- (Romania) Dragoș Barabaș
- (Romania) Constantin Budescu
- (Romania) Hristu Chiacu
- (Romania) Ionel Ciortan
- (Romania) Deniz Giafer
- (Romania) Ricardo Grigore
- (Romania) Claudiu Herea
- (Romania) Cătălin Hlistei
- (Romania) Alin Ilin
- (Romania) Stelian Isac
- (Romania) George Isvoranu
- (Romania) Cosmin Ionică
- (Romania) George Ivan
- (Romania) Felix Manciu
- (Romania) Marian Mihai
- (Romania) Vasile Mihai
- (Romania) Liviu Osca
- (Romania) Ionuț Panțîru
- (Romania) Adrian Petre
- (Romania) Dorian Perianu
- (Romania) Gabriel Plumbuitu
- (Romania) Ștefan Radu
- (Romania) Alexandru Stan

Moldova

- (Moldova) Radu Rogac

North Macedonia

- (North Macedonia) Mirko Ivanovski

== Former managers ==
- (Romania) Ion Ion (2009–2010)
- (Romania) Virgil Nițoi (2010–2011)
- (Romania) Ion Voicu (2011–2012)
- (Romania) Florin Vlădilă (2013)
- (Romania) Virgil Nițoi (2013–2015)
- (Romania) Florin Bratu (2015–2016)
- (Romania) Tudorel Dumitru (2016–2018)
- (Romania) Ștefan Odoroabă (2018–2022)
- (Romania) Marcel Abăluță (2022)
- (Romania) Valentin Negru (2022)
- (Romania) Alin Ilin (2022) interim
- (Romania) Gabriel Manu (2023)
- (Romania) Florin Stângă (2023)
- (Romania) Alin Ilin (2022) interim
- (Romania) Ștefan Odoroabă (2023–2024)
- (Romania) Dan Alexa (2024–2025)
- (Romania) Bogdan Pătrașcu (2025)
- (Romania) Dinu Todoran (2025–2026)
- (Romania) Alin Ilin (2026) interim
- (Romania) Paul Pîrvulescu (2026)

== League and cup history ==
Season	Tier	League	Place	Notes	Cupa României
2026–27	3	Liga III	TBD		Play-off round
2025–26	2	Liga II	8th (R) (play-out)	Relegated	Third round
2024–25	3	Liga III (Seria V)	1st (C, P)	Promoted	Third round
2023–24	2	Liga II	6th (R) (play-out)	Relegated	Group stage
2022–23	3	Liga III (Seria IV)	1st (C, P)	Promoted	Fourth round
2021–22	3	Liga III (Seria IV)	2nd		Fourth round
2020–21	3	Liga III (Seria IV)	5th		Second round
2019–20	3	Liga III (Seria II)	4th		Fourth round
2018–19	3	Liga III (Seria II)	6th		Fourth round
2017–18	3	Liga III (Seria III)	7th		Second round
2016–17	3	Liga III (Seria II)	3rd		First round
2015–16	3	Liga III (Seria II)	12th		Third round
2014–15	3	Liga III (Seria II)	4th		First round
2013–14	3	Liga III (Seria III)	8th		First round
2012–13	3	Liga III (Seria III)	13th		First round
2011–12	3	Liga III (Seria II)	10th		Fourth round
2010–11	3	Liga III (Seria II)	7th		Third round
2009–10	3	Liga III (Seria II)	9th		—
