= CSM Olimpia Satu Mare =

CSM Olimpia Satu Mare may refer to:

- FC Olimpia Satu Mare, club founded in 1921
- CSM Olimpia Satu Mare (football), football section of an organization founded in 2007

== See also ==
- CSM Satu Mare
