= Daniel Prodan Stadium =

Romanian stadium

- Potcoava (The Horseshoe)
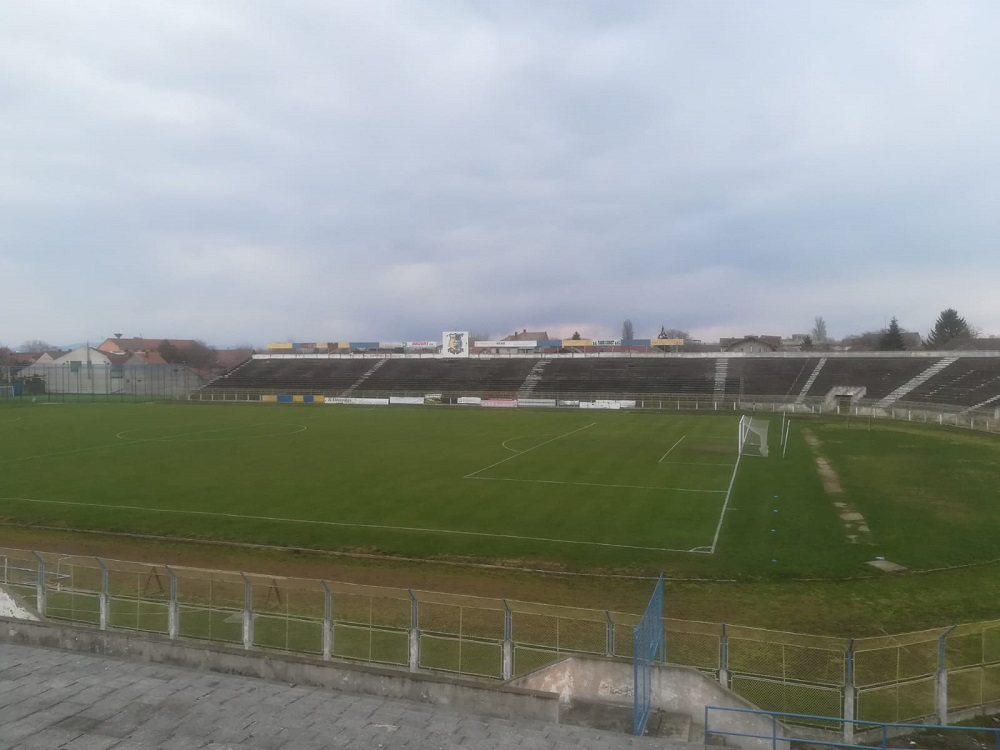
- Interactive map of Daniel Prodan Stadium
- Former names: Olimpia Stadium(1942–2017)
- Address: Str. Arenei, nr.16
- Location: Satu Mare, Romania
- Coordinates: 47°47′58.6″N 22°53′27.7″E
- Owner: Municipality of Satu Mare
- Operator: CSM Satu Mare
- Capacity: 18,000 (1,500 seated)
- Surface: Grass
- Field size: 105 x 68m

Construction
- Built: 1936–1942
- Opened: 1942
- Renovated: 2013

Tenants
- Olimpia Satu Mare (1942–2018); CSM Satu Mare (2018–present)

The Daniel Prodan Stadium is a multi-use stadium located in Satu Mare, Romania. It is currently used mostly for football matches and is the home ground of CSM Satu Mare. For almost all its existence, the stadium was the home ground of Olimpia Satu Mare.

The stadium holds 18,000 people, but only 1,500 on seats and it can also host athletics competitions due to the clay track that surrounds the pitch. It is the 11th stadium in the country by capacity.

The stadium was known as Olimpia Stadium but was renamed in February 2017 as Daniel Prodan Stadium in honor of the former international footballer Daniel Prodan.
