= Denis Furtună =

Moldovan footballer (born 1999)

Personal information
- Date of birth: 13 October 1999 (age 27)
- Place of birth: Fălești, Moldova
- Height: 1.89 m (6 ft 2 in)
- Position: Defender

Team information
- Current team: Tunari
- Number: 44

Youth career
- –2017: Zimbru Chișinău

Senior career*
Years	Team	Apps	(Gls)
2016–2017	Zimbru-2 Chișinău	33	(4)
2017–2021	Zimbru Chișinău	45	(1)
2021	Dacia Buiucani	12	(1)
2021–2023	FC Bălți	47	(4)
2023–2024	Zimbru Chișinău	21	(1)
2024–	Tunari	37	(5)

International career
2015	Moldova U17 (Note: Only official UEFA matches included)	3	(0)
2017	Moldova U19	3	(1)
2019–2020	Moldova U21	6	(1)
- * Club domestic league appearances and goals as of 9 May 2026

Denis Furtună (born 13 October 1999) is a Moldovan professional footballer who plays as a defender for Liga II club Tunari.

== Club career ==
On 9 July 2023, Zimbru Chișinău announced the signing of Furtună.

== International career ==
He has represented Moldova at several youth levels. On 13 October 2020, he scored the only goal of the match as the Moldovan under-21 side achieved a historical home win against Belgium, thus making the "Red Devils" miss out on their qualification for the 2021 UEFA European Under-21 Championship.

== Honours ==
FC Bălți

- Cupa Moldovei runner-up: 2022–23

Zimbru Chișinău

- Cupa Moldovei runner-up: 2023–24

Tunari

- Liga III: 2024–25
