= Radu Rogac =

Moldovan footballer

Personal information
- Date of birth: 7 June 1995 (age 31)
- Place of birth: Bălți, Moldova
- Height: 1.84 m (6 ft 0 in)
- Position: Centre back

Team information
- Current team: Bălți
- Number: 14

Youth career
- –2012: Olimpia Bălți

Senior career*
Years	Team	Apps	(Gls)
2013–2017	Zaria Bălți	84	(0)
2016	→ FC Ungheni (loan)	9	(0)
2017	Dinamo Samarqand	22	(1)
2018	Petrocub Hîncești	8	(1)
2018	Tarxien Rainbows	8	(0)
2019–2020	Dinamo-Auto	26	(0)
2020–2022	Ripensia Timișoara	30	(1)
2022–2023	Viitorul Târgu Jiu	22	(1)
2023	Tunari	6	(0)
2024–	Bălți	1	(0)

International career
2013–2014	Moldova U-19	3	(0)
2015–2016	Moldova U-21	20	(1)
2018–	Moldova	2	(0)
- * Club domestic league appearances and goals as of 26 March 2024

Radu Rogac (born 1995 June 7) is a Moldovan footballer who plays as a centre back for Moldovan Liga club Bălți. In his career Rogac also played for teams such as Zaria Bălți, Dinamo Samarqand, Tarxien Rainbows or Ripensia Timișoara, among others.

== International career ==
At international level, Radu Rogac plays for Moldova national football team and in the past also represented his home country in the U19 and U21 teams.

=== International stats ===
Moldova national team
Year	Apps	Goals
2018	2	0
Total	2	0

== Honours ==
Zaria Bălți

- Moldovan Cup: 2015–16
