= Marian Drăghiceanu =

Romanian footballer

Personal information
- Full name: Marian Liviu Drăghiceanu
- Date of birth: 7 July 1999 (age 27)
- Place of birth: Săvinești, Romania
- Height: 1.77 m (5 ft 10 in)
- Position: Midfielder

Team information
- Current team: CSM Olimpia Satu Mare
- Number: 10

Youth career
- 2008–2015: Ceahlăul Piatra Neamț

Senior career*
Years	Team	Apps	(Gls)
2015–2016	Ceahlăul Piatra Neamț	23	(0)
2017–2018	Dunărea Călărași	19	(4)
2019–2021	Rapid București	47	(12)
2021–2024	CSM Reșița	73	(27)
2024–2026	Sepsi OSK	10	(0)
2026	Cetatea Suceava	6	(0)
2026–	CSM Olimpia Satu Mare	9	(0)

International career
2014	Romania U15	1	(0)
2016–2017	Romania U17	4	(0)
- * Club domestic league appearances and goals as of 10 September 2026

Marian Liviu Drăghiceanu (born 7 July 1999) is a Romanian professional footballer who plays as a midfielder for Liga II club CSM Olimpia Satu Mare.

== Club career ==
=== Ceahlăul Piatra Neamț ===
Drăghiceanu made his Liga I debut at 15 years, 10 months and 10 days, at that time being the 4th youngest debutant (now being 9th). Formed by Ceahlăul Piatra Neamț, Drăghiceanu saw him without a team when Ceahlaul went bankrupt in 2016. For 1 year Drăghiceanu has given evidence of playing to several teams from Italy, but nothing concrete has been achieved and in the summer of 2017 he signed with Dunărea Călărași.

== Honours ==
Dunărea Călărași

- Liga II: 2017–18

Rapid București

- Liga III: 2018–19

CSM Reșița

- Liga III: 2021–22, 2022–23

Individual

- Liga II top scorer: 2023–24 (joint with Bogdan Chipirliu – 14 goals)
