= Alin Ilin =

Romanian footballer

Personal information
- Full name: Alin Sorin Ilin
- Date of birth: 18 July 1984 (age 42)
- Place of birth: Bucharest, Romania
- Height: 1.85 m (6 ft 1 in)
- Position: Midfielder

Team information
- Current team: Tunari (assistant)

Youth career
- –2004: Dinamo București

Senior career*
Years	Team	Apps	(Gls)
2001–2005	Dinamo București	3	(0)
2004–2005	Dinamo II București	23	(4)
2005–2006	Jiul Petroșani	23	(1)
2006–2008	Progresul București	45	(2)
2008	UTA Arad	14	(2)
2009	Jiul Petroșani	18	(2)
2010	Ceahlăul Piatra Neamț	0	(0)
2010	Otopeni	2	(0)
2011–2012	Dunărea Turris Turnu Măgurele		
2012	Săgeata Năvodari	5	(0)
2012–2013	Metaloglobus București		
2013–2014	Tunari	13	(11)
2015–2017	Juventus București	16	(4)
2017–2020	Tunari	30	(15)
Total		192+	(41+)

Managerial career
- 2018–2020: Tunari (player/assistant)
- 2020–2024: Tunari (assistant)
- 2022–2023: Tunari (caretaker)
- 2024–2025: Tunari U17 (caretaker)
- 2025–: Tunari (assistant)
- 2025: Tunari (caretaker)
- 2026: Tunari (caretaker)
- * Club domestic league appearances and goals

Alin Sorin Ilin (born 18 July 1984) is a Romanian former professional footballer who played as a midfielder, currently assistant coach of Liga II club Tunari.

== Honours ==
Dinamo București

- Cupa României: 2004–05

Juventus București

- Liga II: 2016–17
- Liga III: 2015–16
