= Ionuț Pop =

Romanian footballer (born 1997)

Personal information
- Full name: Ionuț Alin Pop
- Date of birth: 1 August 1997 (age 29)
- Place of birth: Oradea, Romania
- Height: 1.90 m (6 ft 3 in)
- Position: Goalkeeper

Team information
- Current team: CSM Olimpia Satu Mare
- Number: 30

Youth career
- –2014: Bihor Oradea
- 2013–2014: → Roma (loan)
- 2014–2016: Roma

Senior career*
Years	Team	Apps	(Gls)
2016–2017	Roma	0	(0)
2016–2017	→ Fidelis Andria (loan)	13	(0)
2017–2019	Alessandria	9	(0)
2019–2026	Hermannstadt	14	(0)
2022–2023	→ CSM Slatina (loan)	25	(0)
2023	→ CSA Steaua București (loan)	3	(0)
2026–	CSM Olimpia Satu Mare	2	(0)

International career
2014–2015	Romania U19	3	(0)
- * Club domestic league appearances and goals as of 8 August 2026

Ionuț Alin Pop (born 1 August 1997) is a Romanian professional footballer who plays as a goalkeeper for Liga II club CSM Olimpia Satu Mare.

== Club career ==
Pop started his career in local club Bihor Oradea, before he signed to Italian first tier A.S. Roma. He never played a match in the first team, he was loaned to third tier Fidelis Andria to the 2016–17 season. He made his professional debut on 14 September 2016 against Paganese, playing 90 minutes. On 7 July 2017, fellow third tier side Alessandria signed him for an undisclosed fee.

On 26 June 2019, Ionuț Pop signed a contract with Liga I side FC Hermannstadt.

== International career ==
Pop made his debut in the Romania national under-19 football team on 17 November 2015 against Switzerland. He received a red card in the 82nd minute.

== Honours ==
Alessandria

- Coppa Italia Serie C: 2017–18

Hermannstadt

- Cupa României runner-up: 2024–25

== Sources ==
- Ionuț Pop at TuttoCalciatori.net (in Italian)
