= Săvinești =

- Commune
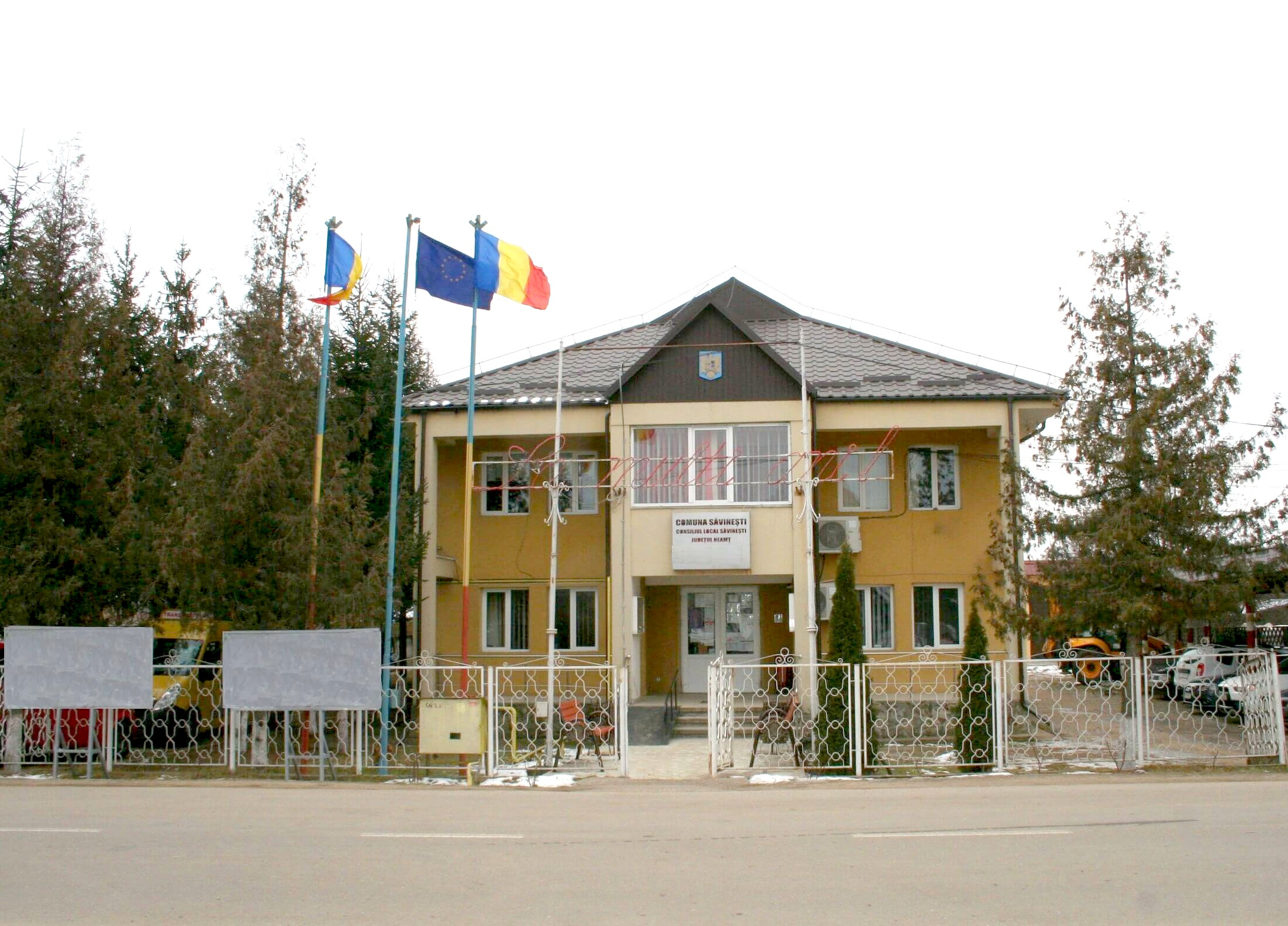
- Săvinești town hall

- Location in Neamț County

- Location in Romania
- Coordinates: 46°52′N 26°28′E
- Country: Romania
- County: Neamț
- Subdivisions: Săvinești, Dumbrava-Deal

Government
  - Mayor (2024–2028): Elena-Brîndușa Dumitrachi (PNL)
- Area: 20.14 km^{2} (7.78 sq mi)
- Elevation: 281 m (922 ft)
- Population (2021-12-01): 5,438
  - Density: 270.0/km^{2} (699.3/sq mi)
- Time zone: UTC+02:00 (EET)
  - Summer (DST): UTC+03:00 (EEST)
- Postal code: 617410
- Area code: +40 x33
- Vehicle reg.: NT
- Website: www.savinesti.ro

Săvinești is a commune in Neamț County, Western Moldavia, Romania. It is composed of two villages, Dumbrava-Deal and Săvinești.

The commune is situated at 8 kilometres (5 mi) south of Piatra Neamț on DN15 road and it is regarded as one of Piatra Neamț's satellite towns. The Săvinești Industrial Park (one of the biggest chemical plants in Romania) is located there.

Historical population
Year	Pop.	±%
1992	6,841	—
2002	6,043	−11.7%
2011	6,333	+4.8%
2021	5,438	−14.1%
Source: Census data

== Natives ==
- Marian Drăghiceanu (born 1999), footballer
- Alexandru M. Vitzu (1852–1902), zoologist and corresponding member of the Romanian Academy
