= Lucian Ion =

Romanian footballer

Personal information
- Full name: Lucian Nicolae Ion
- Date of birth: 10 March 1994 (age 32)
- Place of birth: Otopeni, Romania
- Height: 1.78 m (5 ft 10 in)
- Position: Midfielder

Team information
- Current team: Tunari
- Number: 27

Youth career
- –2010: Otopeni

Senior career*
Years	Team	Apps	(Gls)
2011–2013	Otopeni	7	(0)
2012–2013	→ Balotești (loan)		
2013–2015	Balotești	18	(2)
2015	Concordia Chiajna	4	(0)
2016–2018	Balotești	55	(4)
2018–2019	Sportul Snagov	33	(2)
2019–2022	Concordia Chiajna	41	(3)
2022–	Tunari	42	(4)

International career
2015	Romania U21	2	(0)
- * Club domestic league appearances and goals as of 9 May 2026

Lucian Nicolae Ion (born 10 March 1994) is a Romanian professional footballer who plays as a midfielder for Liga II club Tunari.

== Honours ==
Balotești

- Liga III: 2013–14

Tunari

- Liga III: 2022–23, 2024–25
