= Viktor Kun =

Romanian footballer (born 2004)

Personal information
- Full name: Viktor Kun-György
- Date of birth: 18 July 2004 (age 22)
- Place of birth: Cluj-Napoca, Romania
- Height: 1.81 m (5 ft 11 in)
- Positions: Midfielder; right-back

Team information
- Current team: CFR Cluj/CSM Olimpia Satu Mare
- Number: 86/

Youth career
- 2010–2023: CFR Cluj

Senior career*
Years	Team	Apps	(Gls)
2023–	CFR Cluj	27	(0)
2023–2024	→ SCM Zalău (loan)		
2025	→ Unirea Dej (loan)		
2026	CSM Olimpia Satu Mare	0	(0)
- * Club domestic league appearances and goals as of 12 October 2026

Viktor Kun-György (born 18 July 2004) is a Romanian professional footballer who plays as a midfielder or a right-back for Liga I club CFR Cluj and for Liga II club CSM Olimpia Satu Mare.

== Career statistics ==
As of match played 28 October 2026

Club	Season	League			Cupa României		Europe		Other		Total	
Club	Season	Division	Apps	Goals	Apps	Goals	Apps	Goals	Apps	Goals	Apps	Goals
SCM Zalău (loan)	2023–24	Liga III	?	?	?	?	–		2 (Note: Appearances in Liga III promotion play-offs)	0	2	0
CFR Cluj	2024–25	Liga I	0	0	0	0	0	0	–		0	0
CFR Cluj	2025–26	Liga I	20	0	2	0	0	0	0	0	22	0
CFR Cluj	2026–27	Liga I	7	0	2	0	2 (Note: Appearances in UEFA Conference League)	0	–		11	0
CFR Cluj	Total		27	0	4	0	2	0	0	0	33	0
Unirea Dej (loan)	2024–25	Liga III	?	?	–		–		–		?	?
CSM Olimpia Satu Mare	2026–27	Liga II	0	0	–		–		–		0	0
Career total			27	0	4	0	2	0	2	0	35	0

== Honours ==
SCM Zalău

- Liga III: 2023–24
