= Gabriel Plumbuitu =

Romanian professional footballer

Personal information
- Full name: Gabriel Valentin Plumbuitu
- Date of birth: 14 February 2004 (age 22)
- Place of birth: Bucharest, Romania
- Height: 1.79 m (5 ft 10 in)
- Position: Forward

Team information
- Current team: Ștefănești

Youth career
- –2019: Daco-Getica București

Senior career*
Years	Team	Apps	(Gls)
2019–2020	Daco-Getica București	6	(1)
2020–2022	Gaz Metan Mediaș	4	(0)
2021	→ Metaloglobus București (loan)	6	(0)
2022	→ ASU Politehnica Timișoara (loan)	0	(0)
2022–2026	Tunari	74	(5)
2026–	Ștefănești	0	(0)

International career
2019–2020	Romania U16	8	(1)
2021	Romania U18	3	(0)
- * Club domestic league appearances and goals as of 13 December 2025

Gabriel Valentin Plumbuitu (born 14 February 2004) is a Romanian professional footballer who plays as a forward for Liga II club Ștefănești.

== Honours ==
Tunari

- Liga III: 2022–23, 2024–25
