= Tunari Stadium =

Romanian stadium

- Interactive map of Tunari Stadium
- Address: Str. Traian
- Location: Tunari, Romania
- Coordinates: 44°33′07.0″N 26°08′32.0″E
- Owner: Commune of Tunari
- Operator: CS Tunari
- Capacity: 1,700 seated
- Surface: Grass

Construction
- Opened: 1990s
- Renovated: 2000s, 2017–2018

Tenant
- CS Tunari (1992–present)

The Tunari Stadium is a multi-use stadium in Tunari, Romania, it is used mostly for football matches and is the home ground of CS Tunari. The stadium was built in the 1990s, has a capacity of 1,700 seats and was renovated for two times, in 2004, then between 2017 and 2018.

During the 2023–24 season, the stadium underwent renovations, prompting CS Tunari to relocate their home matches to the Central Stadium of the Romanian National Football Centre.

== Gallery ==
Entrance

General view

Logo on the wall

Pitch renovation in 2024
