= CSM Satu Mare =

CSM Satu Mare may refer to:

- CSM Satu Mare (basketball), a Romanian women's basketball club
- CSM Satu Mare (football), a Romanian men's football club
- CSM Satu Mare (handball), a Romanian men's handball club
- CSM Satu Mare (volleyball), a Romanian women's volleyball club
