= Vasile Mihai =

Romanian footballer

Personal information
- Full name: Vasile Fernando Nicolae Mihai
- Date of birth: 29 November 1995 (age 30)
- Place of birth: Tecuci, Romania
- Height: 1.71 m (5 ft 7 in)
- Position: Midfielder

Youth career
- 2009–2013: Gheorghe Hagi Academy
- 2013–2014: Voluntari

Senior career*
Years	Team	Apps	(Gls)
2014–2021	Voluntari	10	(1)
2014–2021	Voluntari II	32	(16)
2015	→ CS Ștefănești (loan)		
2016	→ Unirea Tărlungeni (loan)	15	(5)
2017	→ Afumați (loan)	10	(1)
2018	→ ASU Politehnica (loan)	13	(3)
2018–2019	→ Balotești (loan)	33	(9)
2022–2023	Tunari	28	(18)
2023	Agricola Borcea	12	(7)
2023–2024	Gloria Bistrița	13	(4)
- * Club domestic league appearances and goals

Vasile Fernando Mihai (also known as Vasile Fernando Nicolae; born 29 November 1995) is a Romanian professional footballer who plays as a midfielder.

== Honours ==
FC Voluntari

- Romanian Cup : 2016-17
