= Alin Boțogan =

Romanian footballer

Personal information
- Full name: Alin Marius Boțogan
- Date of birth: 21 February 2004 (age 22)
- Place of birth: Ploiești, Romania
- Height: 1.79 m (5 ft 10 in)
- Position: Winger

Team information
- Current team: CSM Olimpia Satu Mare
- Number: 86

Youth career
- –2021: Petrolul Ploiești

Senior career*
Years	Team	Apps	(Gls)
2021–2026	Petrolul Ploiești	37	(0)
2022–2023	→ Unirea Slobozia (loan)	20	(1)
2023–2024	→ Chindia Târgoviște (loan)	22	(1)
2026–	CSM Olimpia Satu Mare	4	(0)

International career^{‡}
2021–2022	Romania U18	5	(0)
2022–2023	Romania U19	7	(0)
2023–2025	Romania U20	9	(0)
2025–2026	Romania U21	7	(0)
- * Club domestic league appearances and goals as of 25 October 2026 ‡ National team caps and goals as of 27 March 2026

Alin Marius Boțogan (born 21 February 2004) is a Romanian professional footballer who plays as a winger for Liga II club CSM Olimpia Satu Mare.

== Honours ==
Petrolul Ploieşti

- Liga II: 2021–22
