= Ciprian Popescu =

Romanian footballer (born 2004)

Personal information
- Full name: Ciprian Bogdan Popescu
- Date of birth: 23 March 2004 (age 22)
- Place of birth: Bucharest, Romania
- Height: 1.80 m (5 ft 11 in)
- Position: Striker

Youth career
- Sport Team București
- –2021: Rapid București
- 2020–2021: → Hermannstadt (loan)

Senior career*
| Years | Team | Apps | (Gls) |
| 2021–2022 | Rapid București | 1 | (0) |

International career^{‡}
| 2021– | Romania U18 | 2 | (0) |
- * Club domestic league appearances and goals as of 18 December 2021 ‡ National team caps and goals as of 5 September 2021

Ciprian Bogdan Popescu (born 23 March 2004) is a Romanian professional footballer who plays as a forward.

== Club career ==
=== Rapid București ===
He made his debut on 18 December 2021 for Rapid București in Liga I match against FC Botoșani.

== Career statistics ==
=== Club ===
As of match played 18 December 2021

Appearances and goals by club, season and competition
| Club | Season | League | | | National Cup (Note: Includes Cupa României) | | Europe | | Other (Note: Appearances in Supercupa României) | | Total | |
| Club | Season | Division | Apps | Goals | Apps | Goals | Apps | Goals | Apps | Goals | Apps | Goals |
|---|---|---|---|---|---|---|---|---|---|---|---|---|
| Rapid București | 2021–22 | Liga I | 1 | 0 | 0 | 0 | 0 | 0 | 0 | 0 | 1 | 0 |
| Career Total | | | 1 | 0 | 0 | 0 | 0 | 0 | 0 | 0 | 1 | 0 |
