= David Croitoru =

Romanian association football player

Personal information
- Full name: David Marian Croitoru
- Date of birth: 9 August 2003 (age 23)
- Place of birth: Bacău, Romania
- Height: 1.77 m (5 ft 10 in)
- Position: Midfielder

Team information
- Current team: Filiași
- Number: 24

Youth career
- –2020: Botoșani

Senior career*
Years	Team	Apps	(Gls)
2020–2022	Botoșani	20	(0)
2022	FC U Craiova	0	(0)
2023	Argeș Pitești	1	(0)
2023	Dumbrăvița	0	(0)
2024–	Filiași	8	(0)
- * Club domestic league appearances and goals as of 10:59, 7 December 2024 (UTC)

David Croitoru (born 9 August 2003) is a Romanian professional footballer who plays as a midfielder for Liga III side CSO Filiași.

== Club career ==
=== Botoșani ===
He made his debut in professional football for Botoșani under the guidance of his father, Marius Croitoru.

== Career statistics ==
=== Club ===
As of 19 February 2023.

Club	Season	League			Cup		Continental		Other		Total	
Club	Season	Division	Apps	Goals	Apps	Goals	Apps	Goals	Apps	Goals	Apps	Goals
Botoșani	2019–20	Liga I	1	0	–		–		–		1	0
Botoșani	2020–21	Liga I	14	0	2	0	–		–		16	0
Botoșani	2021–22	Liga I	5	0	1	0	–		–		6	0
Botoșani	Total		20	0	3	0	–		–		23	0
FC U Craiova	2022–23	Liga I	0	0	1	0	–		–		1	0
Argeș Pitești	2022–23	Liga I	1	0	0	0	–		–		1	0
Career total			21	0	4	0	0	0	0	0	25	0
