= Raoul Mal =

Romanian professional footballer

Personal information
- Date of birth: 19 February 2000 (age 26)
- Place of birth: Trento, Italy
- Height: 1.73 m (5 ft 8 in)
- Position: Midfielder

Youth career
- –2018: Pro Vercelli

Senior career*
Years	Team	Apps	(Gls)
2018–2020	Pro Vercelli	38	(1)
2020–2022	Pistoiese	42	(0)
2022	CFR Cluj	0	(0)
2022	Vergiatese	0	(0)
2022–2023	RG Ticino	7	(0)
2023	Città Di Sant'Agata	3	(1)
2023–2024	Vibonese	18	(2)
2024	Acireale	8	(0)
2024–2025	Favara	14	(0)
- * Club domestic league appearances and goals as of 6 April 2025

Raoul Mal (born 19 February 2000) is a professional footballer who plays as a midfielder.

== Club career ==
He made his Serie C debut for Pro Vercelli on 7 September 2018 in a game against Arezzo.

On 31 January 2022 Pistoiese announced the transfer of Mal to CFR Cluj.
