= Adrian Bălan =

Romanian footballer

Personal information
- Full name: Adrian Ionuț Bălan
- Date of birth: 14 March 1990 (age 36)
- Place of birth: Bucharest, Romania
- Height: 1.85 m (6 ft 1 in)
- Position: Forward

Team information
- Current team: Tunari
- Number: 9

Youth career
- –2005: Sporting Pitești
- 2005–2009: Dinamo București

Senior career*
Years	Team	Apps	(Gls)
2010–2012	Dinamo II București	10	(1)
2012	Damila Măciuca	9	(0)
2013–2014	CS Ștefănești	10	(15)
2014–2019	Voluntari	113	(35)
2019	Politehnica Iași	19	(5)
2020	Hermannstadt	12	(3)
2020–2022	Rapid București	54	(17)
2022–2023	Universitatea Cluj	28	(4)
2023–2025	Concordia Chiajna	38	(10)
2025–	Tunari	27	(5)
- * Club domestic league appearances and goals as of 9 May 2026

Adrian Ionuț Bălan (born 14 March 1990) is a Romanian professional footballer who plays as a forward for Liga II club Tunari.

== Club career ==
=== Voluntari ===
In February 2014, Bălan moved to second league club Voluntari, and eventually helped them gain promotion to the first league. In the 2015–16 season, Bălan made his Liga I debut while playing for them.

=== Politehnica Iași ===
On 27 June 2019, Bălan moved to Liga I club Politehnica Iași, after agreeing to sign a one-year contract with them.

=== Hermannstadt ===
On 15 January 2020, Bălan signed a contract with Romanian club Hermannstadt.

== Honours ==
Voluntari

- Liga II: 2014–15
- Liga III: 2013–14
- Cupa României: 2016–17
- Supercupa României: 2017

Universitatea Cluj

- Cupa României runner-up: 2022–23

Tunari

- Liga III: 2024–25
