= Cătălin Hlistei =

Romanian footballer

Personal information
- Full name: Cătălin Florin Hlistei
- Date of birth: 24 August 1994 (age 32)
- Place of birth: Arad, Romania
- Height: 1.78 m (5 ft 10 in)
- Position: Midfielder

Team information
- Current team: Unirea Sântana

Youth career
- –2013: UTA Arad

Senior career*
Years	Team	Apps	(Gls)
2013–2016	UTA Arad	82	(33)
2016–2017	Pandurii Târgu Jiu	23	(1)
2017–2018	UTA Arad	25	(8)
2018–2019	Sportul Snagov	21	(7)
2019–2022	Rapid București	84	(32)
2022	Universitatea Cluj	4	(0)
2022–2023	Politehnica Iași	24	(8)
2023–2024	Concordia Chiajna	15	(1)
2024–2026	Tunari	29	(11)
2026–	Unirea Sântana	0	(0)
- * Club domestic league appearances and goals as of 29 November 2025

Cătălin Florin Hlistei (born 24 August 1994) is a Romanian professional footballer who plays as a midfielder for Liga III club Unirea Sântana.

== Honours ==
UTA Arad

- Liga III: 2014–15
- Liga IV – Arad County: 2013–14
- Cupa României – Arad County Phase: 2013–14

Rapid București

- Liga III: 2018–19

Politehnica Iași

- Liga II: 2022–23

Tunari

- Liga III: 2024–25
