= FCV Farul II Constanța =

Romanian football club

Farul II Constanța
- Full name: FCV Farul II Constanța
- Nicknames: Marinarii (The Sailors); Rechinii (The Sharks); Alb-albaștrii (The White and Blues); Constănțenii (The People from Constanța); Puștii lui Hagi (Hagi's Kids)
- Short name: Farul II
- Founded: 2003; 23 years ago 2021; 5 years ago (refounded)
- Dissolved: 2023
- Ground: Viitorul–2
- Capacity: 1,000
- Website: https://www.academiahagi.ro/

FCV Farul II Constanța, commonly known as Farul II Constanța (Romanian pronunciation: [ˈfarul konˈstantsa]) or simply Farul II, was the reserve squad of Romanian first league side, Farul Constanța.

== History ==
The team was originally founded in 2003, under the name of FC Farul II Constanța and was enrolled in the Divizia C. Farul II played in the third tier until 2010, without notable results, but the main target of the team was tho grew up talented players for the senior squad of Farul.

On 21 June 2021, Gheorghe Hagi, owner and founder of Viitorul Constanța, Gheorghe Popescu, chairman of Viitorul, and Ciprian Marica, owner of Farul Constanța, announced in a press conference that their teams have merged. The club that would continue in the Liga I will be Farul, while Viitorul virtually disappeared in the process of merger. Another result of this merge was that Farul II was also refounded and subsequently took Liga III place from Viitorul II Constanța.

Farul II was dissolved in July 2023.

== Ground ==
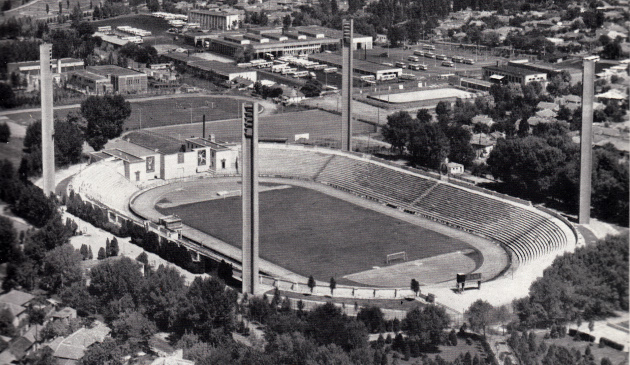
Farul Stadium in the 1980s.

Farul II Constanța use to play its home matches on Stadionul Farul in Constanța. Originally known as Stadionul 1 Mai, the stadium was opened in 1955 and had the shape of the letter "U", but subsequently it was expanded with another stand, finally reaching the capacity of 15,520 seats.

In 1970, Stadionul Farul became the first stadium in Romania to have floodlights installed.

Farul II also played some of its home matches on Viitorul Stadium.

== Honours ==
Liga III

- Runners-up (1): 2022–23

== League history ==
Season	Tier	Division	Place	Cupa României
2022–23	3	Liga III (Seria III)	2nd (R)	

Season	Tier	Division	Place	Cupa României
2021–22	3	Liga III (Seria III)	3rd	
