= CSM Olimpia Satu Mare (football) =

Romanian football club

- Full name: Clubul Sportiv Municipal; Olimpia Satu Mare
- Nickname: Sătmărenii (The People from Satu Mare)
- Short name: CSM, Olimpia, Satu Mare
- Founded: 2018; 8 years ago
- Ground: Daniel Prodan
- Capacity: 18,000 (1,500 seated)
- Owner: Satu Mare Municipality
- General manager: Gabriel Magdaș
- Head coach: Róbert Ilyés
- League: Liga II
- 2026–27: Liga II; Regular season: 21st of 22; Play-out, Group B: 7th
- Website: https://csmolimpia.ro/
| Home colours | Away colours |

Clubul Sportiv Municipal Olimpia Satu Mare, commonly known as CSM Olimpia Satu Mare, or simply as Satu Mare, is a Romanian football club based in Satu Mare, Satu Mare County, currently playing in Liga II. The team represents the football section of the multi-sport club CSM Satu Mare, which also includes basketball, volleyball and handball sections.

CSM Satu Mare was established on 18 July 2007 and is fully supported by the Municipality of Satu Mare. The football section of the club was founded in 2018, following the second dissolution of Olimpia Satu Mare, and was enrolled in Liga IV Satu Mare County. Despite earning promotion in 2019, CSM was not admitted to Liga III due to the late payment of the financial guarantee. The club secured promotion one year later and spent five consecutive seasons in Liga III. In 2023, it was renamed CSM Olimpia Satu Mare, and in 2025 it was promoted to Liga II only to be relegated after one season.

== History ==
=== Formation after the collapse of Olimpia Satu Mare ===
During the winter break of the 2017–18 season, the historic Olimpia Satu Mare withdrew from Liga II amid severe financial problems, effectively ending the club's senior activity. Two separate successor projects subsequently emerged in the city. Supporters organised as Voluntarii Olimpiști founded the fan-owned Olimpia MCMXXI, while the local authorities created a football section within Club Sportiv Municipal Satu Mare. Neither entity had a legal connection to the former club.

The municipal team entered Liga IV – Satu Mare County in 2018. CSM won the county championship in 2018–19 and defeated Minerul Rodna 6–1 on aggregate in the promotion play-off, but was not admitted to Liga III after failing to submit the required financial guarantee in time. The following season was interrupted by the COVID-19 pandemic, with CSM declared county champion before earning promotion through a mini-tournament in Zalău, drawing 0–0 with Someșul Dej and defeating CA Oradea 3–1.

=== Liga III and return to Liga II ===
CSM spent its first two Liga III seasons near the bottom of Series X, before improving significantly in 2022–23, when it finished second in the regular season and third in the play-off. In 2023, the club was renamed CSM Olimpia Satu Mare and adopted the traditional yellow and blue colours associated with the city's former football club.

Olimpia again reached the play-off in 2023–24, finishing third in its series. The following campaign brought the club's breakthrough. With Alexandru Botoș playing a major role in the technical staff and former Romanian international Bogdan Lobonț joining as technical director in January 2025, Olimpia finished second in its series play-off and qualified for the promotion rounds. The Satu Mare side eliminated Minerul Lupeni before defeating Politehnica Timișoara in the decisive round, securing promotion to Liga II in June 2025 and returning the city to the second tier seven years after the collapse of the former Olimpia.

The 2025–26 season proved difficult. After a poor start, Alexandru Botoș initially left the club before later returning, while Bogdan Lobonț departed in October 2025. The squad was heavily changed during the winter break, and Cristian Pustai was appointed technical director in March 2026. Olimpia improved during the play-out and closed to within one point of the relegation play-off position following a 4–0 victory over Șelimbăr, but a 2–2 draw with Concordia Chiajna in the final round left the club second from bottom in Play-out Group B and resulted in relegation on sporting merit.

Despite the relegation, Olimpia obtained the certification required to participate in the 2026–27 Liga II. The club initially prepared for Liga III and appointed Alexandru Pelici as head coach on 1 July 2026. However, on 31 July, one day before the start of the new season, AFC Hermannstadt withdrew from Liga II. Under the applicable federation regulations, CSM Olimpia was awarded the vacant place and therefore remained in the second tier for the 2026–27 season.

== Ground ==
CSM Satu Mare plays its home matches at the Daniel Prodan Stadium in Satu Mare, Satu Mare County, which has a capacity of 18,000 people (1,500 on seats). The stadium was known in the past as Olimpia Stadium and is the historical ground of Olimpia Satu Mare.

== Honours ==
Liga III

- Runners-up (1): 2024–25

Liga IV – Satu Mare County

- Winners (2): 2018–19, 2019–20

== Players ==
=== First-team squad ===
As of 23 October 2026

Note: Flags indicate national team as defined under FIFA eligibility rules; some limited exceptions apply. Players may hold more than one non-FIFA nationality.

| No. | Pos. | Nation | Player |
|---|---|---|---|
| 2 | DF | ROU | Cornel Ardei |
| 5 | MF | ROU | Amir Jorza |
| 6 | DF | ROU | Matei Marin |
| 7 | MF | ROU | Cosmin Zamfir |
| 8 | DF | ROU | Paul Copaci (3rd captain) |
| 9 | FW | ROU | Sergiu Jurj |
| 10 | MF | ROU | Marian Drăghiceanu |
| 11 | FW | ROU | Denis Golda |
| 14 | MF | ROU | Eduard Ardeiu (on loan from Unirea Alba Iulia) |
| 17 | MF | ROU | Alin Văsălie (Vice-captain) |
| 19 | DF | GEQ | José Elo |
| 20 | MF | ROU | Levente Bara |
| 21 | FW | ROU | Gheorghe Cârpă |

| No. | Pos. | Nation | Player |
|---|---|---|---|
| 24 | FW | IRL | Jimmy Kwanga |
| 25 | DF | ROU | Mihai Kereki (on loan from Bihor Oradea) |
| 26 | DF | ROU | Cătălin Oanea (Captain) |
| 27 | MF | HUN | Kristopher Vida |
| 29 | MF | ROU | Eduard Dănilă |
| 30 | GK | ROU | Ionuț Pop |
| 31 | GK | ROU | Vlad Muțiu |
| 69 | GK | ROU | Bence Villi |
| 76 | DF | ROU | Constantin Trip |
| 86 | MF | ROU | Alin Boțogan |
| 91 | MF | FRA | Mickaël Panos |
| 98 | FW | ROU | Nicholas Andone |

=== Dual registration ===
Note: Flags indicate national team as defined under FIFA eligibility rules; some limited exceptions apply. Players may hold more than one non-FIFA nationality.

| No. | Pos. | Nation | Player |
|---|---|---|---|
| 80 | MF | ROU | Cosmin Matei (from CFR Cluj) |
| 99 | MF | ROU | David Miclăuș (from CFR Cluj) |
| — | DF | ROU | Viktor Kun (from CFR Cluj) |

| No. | Pos. | Nation | Player |
|---|---|---|---|
| — | MF | ROU | Răzvan Gligor (from CFR Cluj) |
| — | FW | ROU | Răzvan Bârstan (from CFR Cluj) |

=== Out on loan ===
Note: Flags indicate national team as defined under FIFA eligibility rules; some limited exceptions apply. Players may hold more than one non-FIFA nationality.

| No. / Pos. / Nation / Player; — / MF / ROU / Denis Toma (at Unirea Tășnad until 30 June 2027) | No. / Pos. / Nation / Player; — / MF / ROU / Gabriel Palinkas (at Unirea Tășnad until 30 June 2027) |

== Club Officials ==
=== Board of directors ===
| Role | Name |
|---|---|
| Owner | (Romania) Satu Mare Municipality |
| President | (Romania) István Mureșan |
| General Manager | (Romania) Gabriel Magdaș |
| Sporting director | (Romania) Ciprian Muntean |
| Team Manager | (Romania) Gergő Juhász |

=== Current technical staff ===
| Role | Name |
|---|---|
| Head coach | (Romania) Róbert Ilyés |
| Assistant coaches | (Romania) László Albu (Romania) Alexandru Botoș |
| Goalkeeping coach | (Hungary) Tamás Csorvási |
| Fitness coach | (Romania) Árpád Takács |
| Club doctor | (Romania) Edömér Szilágyi |
| Masseur | (Romania) Vlad Silaghi |

== League and cup history ==
| Season | Tier | League | Place | Notes | Cupa României |
|---|---|---|---|---|---|
| 2026–27 | 2 | Liga II | TBD | | Third round |
| 2025–26 | 2 | Liga II | 21st | Spared from (R) | Play-off round |
| 2024–25 | 3 | Liga III (Seria X) | 2nd | Promoted | Second round |
| 2023–24 | 3 | Liga III (Seria X) | 3rd | | Second round |
| 2022–23 | 3 | Liga III (Seria X) | 3rd | | Third round |
| 2021–22 | 3 | Liga III (Seria X) | 8th | | Second round |
| 2020–21 | 3 | Liga III (Seria X) | 8th | | |
| 2019–20 | 4 | Liga IV (SM) | 1st (C) | Promoted | |
| 2018–19 | 4 | Liga IV (SM) | 1st (C) | | |
