= Tunari =

- Commune
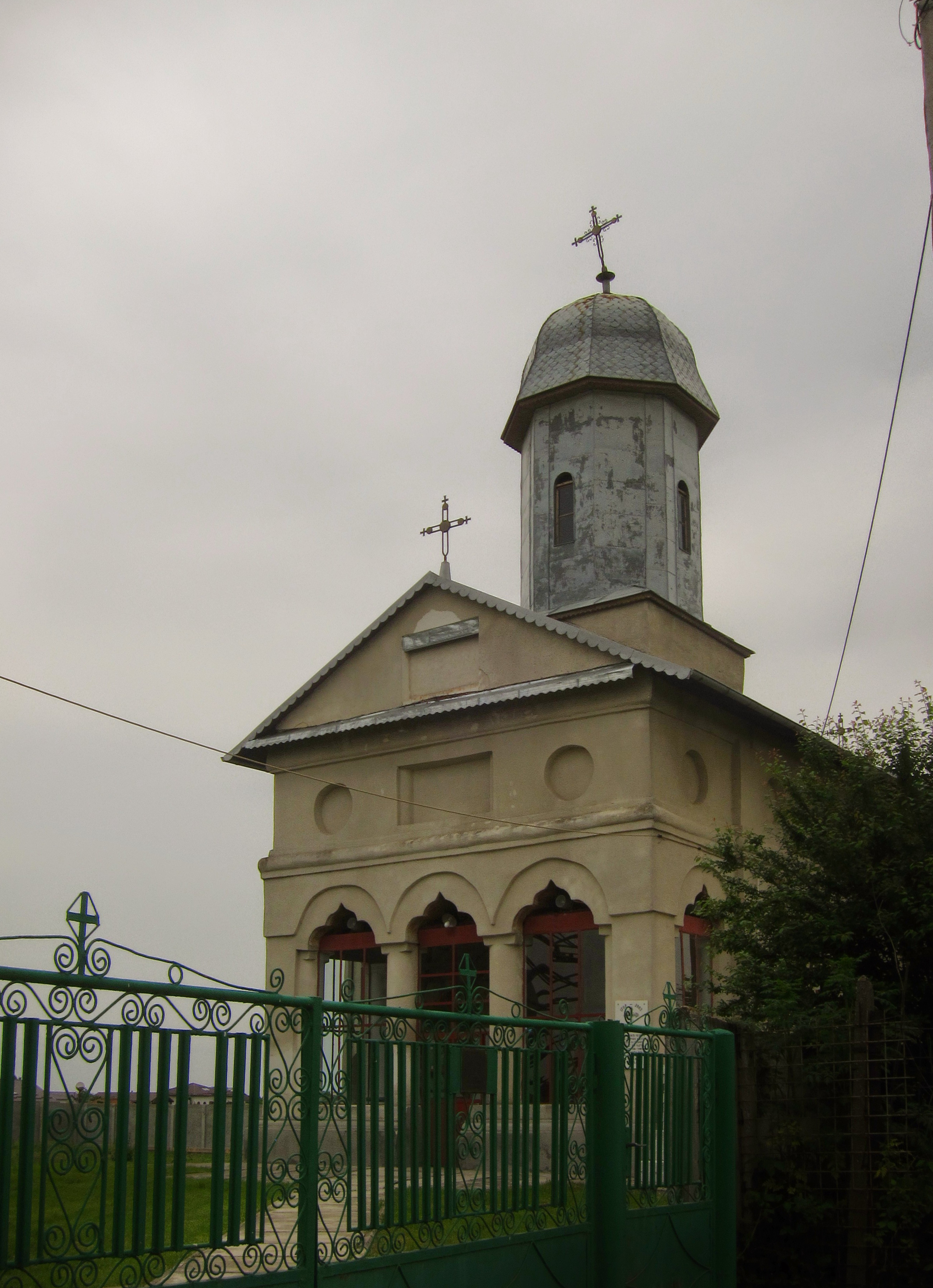
- Saint Nicholas Church, Tunari

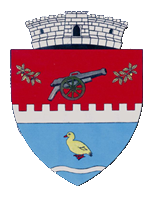
- Coat of arms

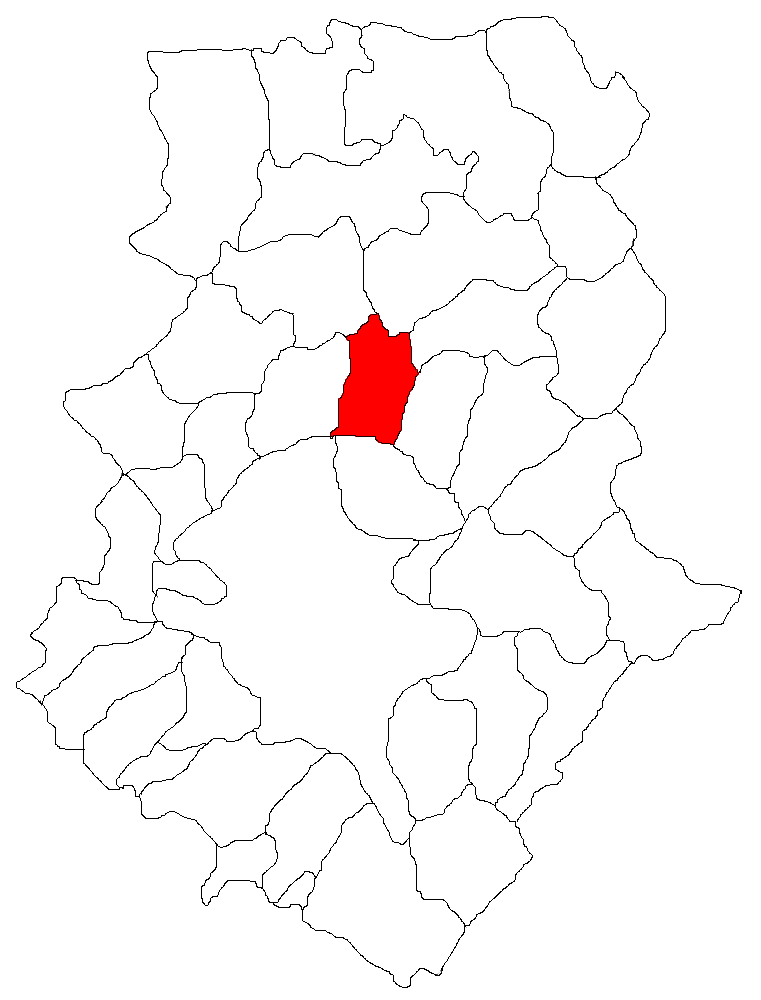
- Location in Ilfov County

- Location in Romania
- Coordinates: 44°33′N 26°8′E
- Country: Romania
- County: Ilfov

Government
  - Mayor (2020–2024): Cristian Niculae (PSD)
- Area: 29.81 km^{2} (11.51 sq mi)
- Elevation: 89 m (292 ft)
- Population (2021-12-01): 9,617
  - Density: 322.6/km^{2} (835.6/sq mi)
- Time zone: UTC+02:00 (EET)
  - Summer (DST): UTC+03:00 (EEST)
- Postal code: 077180
- Area code: +(40) 21
- Vehicle reg.: IF
- Website: v2.primaria-tunari.ro

Tunari is a commune in the center of Ilfov County, Muntenia, Romania. Its name means "cannoneers" in Romanian. It is composed of two villages, Dimieni and Tunari.

The commune is located in the central part of the county, at a distance of 8 km (5.0 mi) north of the capital city, Bucharest, on the Bucharest–Pipera–Tunari–Dimieni road. It has the following neighbors:

- To the north: Henri Coandă International Airport and Balotești commune, separated by the Bucharest–Urziceni railway.
- To the south: the Pipera district of Voluntari commune, separated by the Bucharest–Constanța railway and the Bucharest Ring Motorway on the Otopeni–Ștefăneștii de Jos segment.
- To the east: Ștefăneștii de Jos commune.
- To the west: the town of Otopeni.

The town has a Romanian Orthodox church, named after Saint Nicholas; it was built in 1702 by Marica Brâncoveanu.

Historical population
Year	Pop.	±%
2002	3,804	—
2011	5,336	+40.3%
2021	9,617	+80.2%
Source: Census data
