= 2025–26 AFC Metalul Buzău season =

Metalul Buzău
2025–26 season
- Chairman: Gheorghe Guiu
- Head coach: Valentin Stan
- Stadium: Metalul & Buzău Municipal Stadium
- Liga II: 8th
- Cupa României: Quarter-finals
- Top goalscorer: League: Valentin Robu (18); All: Valentin Robu (21)
- Biggest win: Metalul Buzău 5–1 CSC Dumbrăvița
- Biggest defeat: Metalul Buzău 1–4 Gloria Bistrița
Home colours	Away colours	Third colours

The 2025–26 season is the 72th season of AFC Metalul Buzău and their 2rd consecutive season in the second flight of Romanian football, 0 seasons are in the top flight. In addition to the domestic league, Metalul are also participating in the Cupa României.

== Current squad ==
=== First team squad ===
As of 15 February 2026

Note: Flags indicate national team as defined under FIFA eligibility rules; some limited exceptions apply. Players may hold more than one non-FIFA nationality.

No.	Pos.	Nation	Player
1	GK	ROU	Costel Toader (3rd captain)
2	DF	ROU	Claudiu Juncănaru
3	DF	ROU	Damian Cimpoeșu
4	DF	ROU	Alberto Olaru (3rd captain)
5	DF	ROU	Dănilă Parfeon
6	MF	JPN	Yasuhiro Hanada
7	FW	ROU	Cristian Dumitru
8	MF	ROU	Dănuț Oprea
9	FW	ROU	Valentin Dumitrache (on loan from Dinamo București)
10	MF	ROU	Marius Tudorică (Vice-captain)
11	FW	ROU	Sabin Moldovan (4th captain)
14	MF	ROU	Florentin Puiu
15	DF	CRO	Nikola Gavrić
17	MF	ROU	Bogdan Ion

No.	Pos.	Nation	Player
19	MF	ROU	Darius Băncilă (on loan from Hellas Verona)
20	MF	ROU	Răzvan Milea
23	GK	ROU	Relu Stoian
25	GK	ROU	Iulian Dinu
26	DF	LAT	Aleksejs Kudeļkins
27	MF	ROU	Florin Opaiț
28	MF	ROU	Valentin Robu
33	DF	ROU	Răzvan Radu (on loan from FCSB)
55	DF	LAT	Aleksejs Kudeļkins
77	MF	ROU	Alexandru Oancea
80	MF	ROU	Vlad Stancovici (on loan from Petrolul Ploiești)
97	MF	ROU	Alin Nica
98	MF	ROU	Saim Tudor (4th captain)
99	MF	ROU	Claudiu Borțoneanu (Captain)

== Club officials ==
=== Current technical staff 2025–26 ===
Role	Name
Head coach	(Romania) Valentin Stan
Assistant coaches	(Romania) Patrick Benga (Romania) George Țălnar
Goalkeeping coach	(Romania) Ștefan Leu
Video Analyst	(Romania) Dan Păun

== Pre-season and friendlies ==
28 June 2025	Metalul Buzău	2–0	Păulești	Buzău
10:00 EEST (UTC+03)	Borțoneanu 61', 86'	Report		Stadium: Metalul

5 July 2025	Oțelul Galați	2–1	Metalul Buzău	Galați
11:00 EEST (UTC+03)	Andrezinho 50'; Frunză 89'	Report	Moldovan 10'	Stadium: Oțelul

17 January 2026	Metalul Buzău	3–3	CSM Vaslui	Buzău
12:00 EEST (UTC+03)	Dumitru; Radu	Report	Batchabi; Rusu; Baciu	Stadium: Metalul

31 January 2026	Metalul Buzău	2–3	Petrolul Berca	Buzău
11:00 EEST (UTC+03)	Dumitru	Report		Stadium: Metalul

31 January 2026	Metalul Buzău	4–0	CSO Plopeni	Buzău
14:00 EEST (UTC+03)	Robu; Tudor; Milea	Report		Stadium: Metalul

5 February 2026	Metalul Buzău	2–1	Tunari	Buzău
12:00 EEST (UTC+03)	Dumitrache 22'; Nica 40'	Report	? 47' (pen.)	Stadium: Metalul

7 February 2026	Metalul Buzău	6–0	Farul Constanța U19	Buzău
12:00 EEST (UTC+03)	Dumitrache; Tudorică; Gavrić; Radu	Report		Stadium: Metalul

== Competitions ==
=== Liga II ===
==== Regular season ====
Pos	Team	Pld	W	D	L	GF	GA	GD	Pts	Qualification
8	Reșița	21	10	3	8	35	29	+6	33	Qualification for Relegation play-out
9	Bacău	21	9	6	6	28	26	+2	33	Qualification for Relegation play-out
10	Metalul Buzău	21	10	2	9	33	26	+7	32	Qualification for Relegation play-out
11	Politehnica Iași	21	9	4	8	25	22	+3	31	Qualification for Relegation play-out
12	Afumați	21	9	3	9	30	26	+4	30	Qualification for Relegation play-out

Source: FRF (in Romanian)
Rules for classification: During Season: 1) Points, 2) Goal difference, 3) Goals scored. End of Season: 1) Points, 2) Head-to-head points, 3) Head-to-head goal difference, 4) Goal difference, 5) Goals scored

=== Matches ===
2 August 2025 1	FC Voluntari	2–1	Metalul Buzău	Voluntari
11:00 EEST (UTC+03)	Merloi 72'; Guțea 13'		Robu 42'	Stadium: Anghel Iordănescu Stadium

9 August 2025 2	Metalul Buzău	0–0	Sepsi OSK	Buzău
11:30 EEST (UTC+03)				Stadium: Metalul

16 August 2025 3	CSM Slatina	2–3	Metalul Buzău	Slatina
11:00 EEST (UTC+03)	Dragu 85'; Leața 87'		Puiu 48', 65'; Tudor 57'	Stadium: May 1 Stadium

23 August 2025 4	Metalul Buzău	0–1	Corvinul Hunedoara	Buzău
11:00 EEST (UTC+03)			Buziuc 85'	Stadium: Metalul

30 August 2025 5	CS Afumați	0–2	Metalul Buzău	Afumați
11:00 EEST (UTC+03)			Tudor 10'; Robu 75'	Stadium: Comunal

13 September 2025 6	Metalul Buzău	1–0	CSC Șelimbăr	Buzău
11:00 EEST (UTC+03)	Tudor 18' (pen.)			Stadium: Metalul

20 September 2025 7	Politehnica Iași	2–1	Metalul Buzău	Iași
12:30 EEST (UTC+03)	Ofori 15'; Ștefanovici 90+3'		Robu 59'	Stadium: Emil Alexandrescu Stadium

27 September 2025 8	Metalul Buzău	0–1	CSM Satu Mare	Buzău
11:00 EEST (UTC+03)			Zamfir 46'	Stadium: Metalul

4 October 2025 9	CS Tunari	2–4	Metalul Buzău	Tunari
11:00 EEST (UTC+03)	Stanciu 70'; Dragu 80'		Robu 33'; Nica 34'; Micu 75' (own.); Tudor 83'	Stadium: Tunari Stadium

18 October 2025 10	Metalul Buzău	5–1	CSC Dumbrăvița	Buzău
11:00 EEST (UTC+03)	Robu 5', 16', 22' (pen.), 53'; Tudor 87'		Curescu 77' (pen.)	Stadium: Metalul

25 October 2025 11	Concordia Chiajna	1–2	Metalul Buzău	Chiajna
11:00 EEST (UTC+03)	Pop 70'		Robu 38' (pen.); Dumitrache 42'	Stadium: Concordia Stadium

1 November 2025 12	Metalul Buzău	4–0	Câmpulung	Buzău
11:00 EEST (UTC+03)	Robu 28' (pen.); Moldovan 47'; Nica 56', 70'			Stadium: Metalul

8 November 2025 13	CS Dinamo București	0–2	Metalul Buzău	Bucharest
11:00 EEST (UTC+03)			Borțoneanu 18'; Tudor 65'	Stadium: CNF Buftea

27 November 2025 14	Metalul Buzău	1–1	CSA Steaua București	Buzău
11:00 EEST (UTC+03)	Dumitrache 48'		Pacionel 75'	Stadium: Metalul

30 November 2025 15	CSM Reșița	2–0	Metalul Buzău	Reșița
12:30 EEST (UTC+03)	Modan 14'; Jerdea 33' (pen.)			Stadium: Mircea Chivu Stadium

7 December 2025 16	Metalul Buzău	2–1	Ceahlăul Piatra Neamț	Buzău
11:00 EEST (UTC+03)	Tudor 10'; Robu 70'		Davordzie 7' (pen.)	Stadium: Metalul

14 December 2025 17	FC Bihor	2–1	Metalul Buzău	Oradea
11:00 EEST (UTC+03)	Tescan 5'; Hora 87' (pen.)		Kereki 23' (own.)	Stadium: Iuliu Bodola Stadium

21 February 2026 18	Metalul Buzău	0–1	FC Bacău	Buzău
11:00 EEST (UTC+03)			Luncașu 16'	Stadium: Metalul

28 February 2026 19	ASA Târgu Mureș	1–0	Metalul Buzău	Târgu Mureș
13:00 EEST (UTC+03)	Rotund 34'			Stadium: Trans-Sil Stadium

8 March 2026 20	Metalul Buzău	1–4	Gloria Bistrița	Buzău
11:00 EEST (UTC+03)	Robu 3'		Mensah 25', 41'; Câmpan 33'; Oprea 75' (own)	Stadium: Metalul

14 March 2026 21	Chindia Târgoviște	2–3	Metalul Buzău	Târgoviște
12:30 EEST (UTC+03)	Honciu 23'; Doumtsios 57'		Robu 9'; Nica 19'; Dumitrache 68'	Stadium: Eugen Popescu Stadium

=== Relegation play-out ===
A relegation play-out tournament between the last 16 ranked teams at the end of the regular season decide the five teams that will be relegated to Liga III. Two play-out groups were made: the first group consisted of teams ranked 7, 10, 11, 14, 15, 18, 19 and 22, and the second group consisted of teams ranked 8, 9, 12, 13, 16, 17, 20 and 21, at the end of the regular season. The teams started the relegation play-out with all the points accumulated in the regular season. Two teams from each group were relegated to Liga III.

=== Group A ===
Table

Pos	Team	Pld	W	D	L	GF	GA	GD	Pts
1	ASA Târgu Mureș	7	4	2	1	16	7	+9	51
2	Metalul Buzău	7	6	0	1	16	6	+10	50
3	Slatina	7	5	2	0	13	4	+9	43
4	Politehnica Iași	7	3	1	3	7	6	+1	41

Source: FRF
Rules for classification: 1) Points; 2) Points in the regular season; 3) Head-to-head points; 4) Head-to-head goal difference; 5) Head-to-head goals scored; 6) Head-to-head away goals scored; 7) Goal difference (regular season + play out); 8) Goals scored (regular season + play out); 9) Play-off.

=== Matches ===
21 March 2025 1	Metalul Buzău	4–2	CS Dinamo București	Buzău
11:00 EEST (UTC+03)	Robu 25'; Dumitrache 59'; Stancovici 78'; Dumitru 90+2'		Mălăele 86'; C. Cocoș 88'	Stadium: Buzău Municipal Stadium; Referee: Cristian Vîrgolici

4 April 2026 2	ASA Târgu Mureș	1–4	Metalul Buzău	Târgu Mureș
11:00 EEST (UTC+03)	Măgerușan 90+3'		Milea 13'; Dumitrache 25'; Moldovan 53', 71'	Stadium: Trans-Sil Stadium; Referee: Andrei Vremăroiu

10 April 2026 3	Metalul Buzău	1–0	Câmpulung	Buzău
11:00 EEST (UTC+03)	Dumitrache 59'			Stadium: Buzău Municipal Stadium; Referee: Alexandru Costin Marinoiu

18 April 2026 4	Metalul Buzău	2–0	Politehnica Iași	Buzău
11:00 EEST (UTC+03)	Tudor 48'; Robu 51'			Stadium: Buzău Municipal Stadium; Referee: Mircea Salomir

25 April 2025 5	Gloria Bistrița	0–1	Metalul Buzău	Bistrița
11:00 EEST (UTC+03)			Robu 88'	Stadium: Jean Pădureanu Stadium; Referee: Gellert Fereki

2 May 2026 6	Metalul Buzău	1–3	CSM Slatina	Buzău
11:00 EEST (UTC+03)	Robu 75'		Kudeļkins 36' (own.); Rodrigo Hernando 43'; Pacionel 53'	Stadium: Buzău Municipal Stadium; Referee: Norbert Kemenes

9 May 2026 7	Ceahlăul Piatra Neamț	0–3	Metalul Buzău	Piatra Neamț
11:00 EEST (UTC+03)			Opaiț 12'; Robu 24'; Dumitru 56'	Stadium: Ceahlăul Stadium; Referee: Dan Buzărnescu

=== Cupa României ===
==== Third round ====
13 August 2025	CSM Râmnicu Sărat	3–4	Metalul Buzău	Râmnicu Sărat
17:30 EEST (UTC+03)	Micu 7'; Ignat 72'; Scol 90+1' (pen.)		Moldovan 2' (pen.), 51'; Tudor 90+4' (pen.)	Stadium: Municipal; Referee: Iftode Silviu Nicolae

==== Playoff-round ====
27 August 2025	Metalul Buzău	4–0	Ceahlăul Piatra Neamț	Buzău
17:30 EEST (UTC+03)	Moldovan 13', 67'; Robu 86'; Tudor 90+1'			Stadium: Metalul; Referee: Peşu Ionela Alina

==== Group stage ====
Pos	Team	Pld	W	D	L	GF	GA	GD	Pts	Qualification	UCJ	MET	CSI	OTE	SEP	LIE
1	Universitatea Cluj	3	2	1	0	6	3	+3	7	Advance to knockout phase	—	—	—	2–0	—	—
2	Metalul Buzău	3	2	0	1	9	6	+3	6	Advance to knockout phase	1–2	—	—	—	1–0	—
3	Csíkszereda Miercurea Ciuc	3	1	1	1	6	2	+4	4		—	—	—	1–2	0–0	—
4	Oțelul Galați	3	1	1	1	5	6	−1	4		—	—	—	—	—	—
5	Sepsi Sfântu Gheorghe	3	0	2	1	2	3	−1	2		2–2	—	—	—	—	—
6	Sporting Liești	3	0	1	2	7	15	−8	1		—	4–7	0–5	3–3	—	—

Source: Flashscore
Legend: Blue = home team win; Yellow = draw; Red = away team win.

=== Matches ===
29 October 2025 1	Metalul Buzău	1–2	Universitatea Cluj	Buzău
15:00 EET (UTC+02)	Dumitrache 45+3'		Trică 50'; Taiwo 90+1'	Stadium: Metalul Stadium; Referee: Vlad Băban

4 December 2025 2	Sporting Liești	4–7	Metalul Buzău	Liești
14:00 EET (UTC+02)	Costea 13', 33'; Voinea 37'; Tudor 72'		Dumitru 7', 22'; Oprea 17'; Tudor 45+2'; Moldovan 50'; Robu 74'; Nica 90'	Stadium: Comunal

2 February 2026 3	Metalul Buzău	1–0	Sepsi OSK	Buzău
20:00 EET (UTC+02)	Robu 35'			Stadium: Buzău Municipal Stadium

==== Quarter-finals ====
5 March 2026 Quarter-finals	Dinamo București	1–0	Metalul Buzău	București
20:00 EEST (UTC+3)	Pop 26'			Stadium: Arcul de Triumf; Referee: Robert Avram

== Transfers ==
=== Transfers in ===
Date	Position	Nationality	Name	From	Fee	Ref.
23 August 2025	GK	(Romania)	Relu Stoian	Universitatea Craiova	Free	
23 August 2025	LW	(Romania)	Matei Tănasă	Politehnica Iași	Free	
24 August 2025	CB	(Croatia)	Nikola Gavrić	KF Besa Dobërdoll	Free	
23 January 2026	CM	(Romania)	Răzvan Milea	Metaloglobus București	Free	
26 January 2026	CB	(Romania)	Damian Cimpoeșu	Steaua București	Free	
9 February 2026	CB	(Latvia)	Aleksejs Kudeļkins	BFC Daugavpils	Free	

=== Transfers out ===
Date	Position	Nationality	Name	To	Fee	Ref.
8 August 2025	CM	(Romania)	Dan Stan	Free agent		
17 August 2025	CB	(Romania)	Ciprian Perju	Cetatea Suceava	Free	
19 August 2025	GK	(Romania)	George Micle	SCM Râmnicu Vâlcea	Free	

=== Loans In ===
Date	Position	Nationality	Name	From	Date until	Ref.
1 July 2025	ST	(Romania)	Valentin Dumitrache	Dinamo București	30 June 2026	
1 July 2025	CM	(Romania)	Vlad Stancovici	Petrolul Ploiești	30 June 2026	
1 July 2025	CM	(Romania)	Darius Băncilă	Hellas Verona	30 June 2026	

=== Loans out ===
Date	Position	Nationality	Name	To	Date until	Ref.
11 August 2025	CB	(Romania)	Gabriel Dănuleasă	Farul Constanța	31 December 2025	
10 July 2025	CM	(Romania)	Răzvan Gâțan	Viitorul Cluj	31 December 2025	
14 April 2023	CM	(Romania)	Alexandru Sandu	Petrolul Berca	30 August 2026	
21 February 2024	CB	(Romania)	Ștefan Nedelcu	Petrolul Berca	30 August 2026	
23 February 2024	CM	(Romania)	Rafael Manea	Petrolul Berca	30 August 2026	
6 February 2025	ST	(Romania)	Andrei Fadei	Unirea Braniștea	30 August 2026	
9 February 2026	GK	(Romania)	Alberto Câșlariu	Gloria Băneasa	30 August 2026	
