= 2026–27 AFC Metalul Buzău season =

AFC Metalul Buzău
2026–27 season
- Chairman: Gheorghe Guiu
- Manager: Valentin Stan
- Stadium: Metalul
- Liga II: In progress
- Cupa României: In progress

The 2026–27 season is the third consecutive season in Liga II for AFC Metalul Buzău, the second tier of the Romanian football league system. In addition to the domestic league, the club competes in this season's edition of the Cupa României.

== Players ==
=== First team squad ===
As of 24 August 2026

Note: Flags indicate national team as defined under FIFA eligibility rules; some limited exceptions apply. Players may hold more than one non-FIFA nationality.

No.	Pos.	Nation	Player
2	DF	ROU	Claudiu Juncănaru
3	DF	ROU	Raul Alecsandroaie (on loan from FCSB)
4	DF	ROU	Alberto Olaru (Vice-captain)
5	DF	ROU	Dănilă Parfeon
6	MF	JPN	Yasuhiro Hanada
7	FW	ROU	Cristian Dumitru
8	MF	ROU	Dănuț Oprea
9	MF	ROU	Geani Crețu
10	MF	ROU	Răzvan Milea
11	FW	ROU	Sabin Moldovan (3rd captain)
14	MF	FRA	Ilyas El Khabchi
15	DF	JPN	Koki Hayashi
19	MF	ROU	Darius Băncilă

No.	Pos.	Nation	Player
20	MF	ROU	Andrei Cubleșan (on loan from Viitorul Cluj)
23	GK	ROU	Andrei Ureche
25	GK	ROU	Iulian Dinu
26	DF	GRE	Nikos Baxevanos
27	MF	ROU	Florin Opaiț
28	FW	ROU	Valentin Robu
33	FW	ROU	Luca Nagy
77	MF	ROU	Florentin Puiu
80	MF	ROU	Ricardo Căldăraru (on loan from Farul Constanța)
97	MF	ROU	Alin Nica
98	MF	ROU	Saim Tudor (4th captain)
99	MF	ROU	Claudiu Borțoneanu (Captain)
—	FW	ROU	Tudor Zoicaș (on loan from Universitatea Cluj)

=== Retirements ===
Note: Flags indicate national team as defined under FIFA eligibility rules; some limited exceptions apply. Players may hold more than one non-FIFA nationality.

No.	Pos.	Nation	Player
1	GK	ROU	Costel Toader

== Club officials ==
=== Current technical staff 2026–27 ===
Role	Name	Ref
Head coach	(Romania) Valentin Stan
Assistant coaches	(Romania) Patrick Benga (Romania) George Țălnar (Romania) Mircea Ștefan
Goalkeeping coach	(Romania) Ștefan Leu
Fitness coach	(Romania) Ștefan Păun
Video Analyst	(Romania) Dan Păun

== Transfers ==
=== In ===
Date	Pos.	Nat.	Player	From club	Transfer fee	Source
1 July 2026	FW	(Romania)	Eric Șomandru	Farul Constanța	loan	
1 July 2026	MF	(Romania)	Geani Crețu	Ceahlăul Piatra Neamț	free	
1 July 2026	DF	(Romania)	Sebastian Bran	Universitatea Cluj	loan	
2 July 2026	GK	(Romania)	Andrei Ureche	Dunărea Călărași	free	
3 July 2026	DF	(Romania)	Andrei Cubleșan	Viitorul Cluj	loan	
8 July 2026	DF	(Romania)	Raul Alecsăndroaie	FCSB II	loan	
9 July 2026	FW	(Romania)	Tudor Zoicaș	Universitatea Cluj	loan	
13 July 2026	DF	(Romania)	Ricardo Căldăraru	Farul Constanța	loan	
4 September 2026	FW	(Romania)	Luca Nagy	Universitatea Cluj	free	
14 September 2026	MF	(France)	Ilyas El Khabchi	Yverdon Sport FC II	free	

=== Out ===
Date	Pos.	Nat.	Player	To club	Transfer fee	Source
30 June 2026	ST	(Romania)	Valentin Dumitrache	Dinamo București	Loan terminated	
30 June 2026	CM	(Romania)	Vlad Stancovici	Petrolul Ploiești	Loan terminated	
1 July 2026	CB	(Latvia)	Aleksejs Kudeļkins	Ogre United	free	
1 July 2026	CB	(Romania)	Damian Cimpoeșu	Sănătatea Cluj	free	
1 July 2026	CB	(Croatia)	Nikola Gavrić	Free agent	free	
1 July 2026	GK	(Romania)	Relu Stoian	Free agent	free	
1 July 2026	FW	(Romania)	Cristian Dumitru	SCM Râmnicu Vâlcea	free	
1 July 2026	CM	(Romania)	Marius Tudorică	SC Popești-Leordeni	free	
1 July 2026	LB	(Romania)	Răzvan Radu	Dinamo București	€60.000	
1 July 2026	CB	(Romania)	Ștefan Nedelcu	Free agent	free	
1 July 2026	CM	(Romania)	Rafael Manea	Free agent	free	
1 July 2026	CM	(Romania)	Alexandru Sandu	Free agent	free	
2 July 2026	LW	(Romania)	Matei Tănasă	CSM Vaslui	free	
2 July 2026	ST	(Romania)	Andrei Fadei	Unirea Braniștea	free	

=== Out on loan ===
Note: Flags indicate national team as defined under FIFA eligibility rules; some limited exceptions apply. Players may hold more than one non-FIFA nationality.

No.	Pos.	Nation	Player

== Pre-season and friendlies ==
Friendly match schedule before the season (27 June - 11 July 2026):

27 June 2026	Metalul Buzău	4–2	CSL Ștefănești	Buzău
11:00	Robu; Crețu; Bran; Moldovan	Report	Florescu; Bobocea	Stadium: Metalul

Lineups:

AFC Metalul Buzău

Andrei Ureche – Claudiu Juncănaru, Dănilă Parfeon, Raul Alecsandroaie, Darius Băncilă, Andrei Cubleșan, Răzvan Milea, Claudiu Borțoneanu, Alexandru Saim Tudor, Valentin Robu, Geani Crețu, Alberto Câșlariu, Florentin Puiu, Adelin Ilie, Alberto Olaru, Sebastian Bran, Sebastian Pîrvan, Alin Nica, Dănuț Oprea, Alexandru Oancea, Yasuhiro Hanada, Adrian Moldovan and Eric Șomandru

CSL Ștefănești

Mociu – Grosu, Gîsă, Vlad, Nicolae, Gheorghe, Purice, Man, Dumitru, Bobocea, Manole.

Reserves were: Lăpădat, Mihai, Stănici, Banu, Coman, Zimța, Stavrositu, Bogdan, Florescu, Șchiopu, Tănăsescu, Savin, Grancea and Luțu.

CSL Ștefănești
- Manager: Laurenţiu Tudor
- League: Liga II
Home colours

4 July 2026	FC Bacău	2–7	Metalul Buzău	Bacău
10:30	Inglada 30'; Oasenegre 32'	Report	Cubleșan 34'; Tudor 43'; Robu 51'; Moldovan 75', 105'; Hanada 80'; Zoicaș 115'	Stadium: Ruși-Ciutea
Note: The match was played at Ruși-Ciutea and lasted 120 minutes, with the two coaches agreeing that both halves would be 60 minutes long, in order to run all the players available.

Lineups:

ACS FC Bacău

Bacău coach, Costel Enache, started the match with the following 11: Gumenco – Coajă, Dav. Banu, Inglada, Mar. Bordea – Rob. Albu, P. Petre, Gab. Cîrstean, Oasenegre – Luncașu, Andr. Pavel. In the second half, the following came on: Luc. Anton, Alloj, D. Burlacu, Agapi, M. Juric, Rz. Ureche, Fed. Baciu, R. Moise, P. Mitrică, Tud. Acsinte, Gîrbiță and Rob. Ciobanu.

ACS FC Bacău
- Manager: Costel Enache
Away colours

AFC Metalul Buzău

On the other hand, Metalul coach Valentin Stan started the match in the following lineup: Iul. Dinu (Andr. Ureche 45) – Juncănaru, Parfeon, Alexăndroaie, Bran – Borțoneanu – Milea, Saim Tudor, Cubleșan, G. Crețu – Val. Robu, and in the second half goalkeeper Câșlariu and outfield players Căldăraru, Alb. Olaru, Ad. Ilie, Puiu, D. Oprea, Andr. Oancea, A. Nica, Zoicaș, Hanada and Ad. Moldovan also played.

10 July 2026	Metalul Buzău	0–0	Dunărea Călărași	Buzău
11:00		Report		Stadium: Metalul

10 July 2026	FC Voluntari	v	Metalul Buzău	Voluntari
18:00		Report		Stadium: Anghel Iordănescu Stadium

11 July 2026	Unirea Slobozia	0–3	Metalul Buzău	Slobozia
10:15		Report	Băncilă 62'; Robu 85'; Moldovan 90+2'	Stadium: May 1 Stadium

Cantonment in Bansko, Bulgaria (July 16 - 23, 2026):

The squad sent to Bansko, Bulgaria by Metalul Buzău:

goalkeepers: Iulian Dinu, Andrei Ureche, Alberto Câșlariu,

defenders: Florentin Puiu, Claudiu Juncănaru, Dănilă Parfeon, Alberto Olaru, Koki Hayashi, Darius Băncilă, Florin Opaiț, Ricardo Căldăraru, Raul Alecsandroaie, Adelin Ilie,

midfielders: Claudiu Borțoneanu (Captain), Răzvan Milea, Dănuț Oprea, Yasuhiro Hanada, Alin Nica, Alexandru Saim Tudor, Geani Crețu, Andrei Cubleșan, Tudor Zoicaș, Alexandru Oancea,

forwards: Adrian Moldovan, Valentin Robu, Bogdan Ion.

16 July 2026	Metalul Buzău	0–4	CSM Slatina	Bansko, Bulgaria
12:00		Report	Pacionel 50', 65' (pen.); Lăpădătescu 73' (pen.); Sorescu 80',	Stadium: Evima Sport Center

18 July 2026	(Albania) Teuta	1–1	Metalul Buzău	Bansko, Bulgaria
18:30	Zogos 80'	Report	Zoicaș 75'	Stadium: Evima Sport Center

20 July 2026	Metalul Buzău	1–0	(Kosovo) Gjilani	Bansko, Bulgaria
18:30	Moldovan 60'	Report		Stadium: Evima Sport Center

23 July 2026	Metalul Buzău	1–0	(Albania) Vora	Bansko, Bulgaria
18:30	Moldovan 74'	Report		Stadium: Evima Sport Center

== Competitions ==
=== Overall record ===
Competition	First match	Last match	Starting round	Final position
Liga II	1 August 2026	May 2027	Matchday 1	
Cupa României	12 August 2026	18 August 2026	Third Round	Play-off

=== Liga II ===
==== League table ====
Pos	Team	Pld	W	D	L	GF	GA	GD	Pts	Qualification
4	Popești-Leordeni	11	7	3	1	26	15	+11	24	Qualification for Promotion play-off
5	Cetatea Suceava	11	6	3	2	22	12	+10	21	Qualification for Promotion play-off
6	Metalul Buzău	11	6	3	2	13	7	+6	21	Qualification for Promotion play-off
7	Reșița	11	7	0	4	16	13	+3	21	Qualification for Relegation play-out
8	Concordia Chiajna	11	6	1	4	26	18	+8	19	Qualification for Relegation play-out

Updated to match(es) played on 26 October 2026. Source: FRF (in Romanian)
Rules for classification: During season: 1) Points; 2) Goal difference; 3) Goals scored. End of season: 1) Points; 2) Head-to-head points; 3) Head-to-head goal difference; 4) Goal difference; 5) Goals scored

==== Results summary ====
Overall								Home						Away					
Pld	W	D	L	GF	GA	GD	Pts	W	D	L	GF	GA	GD	W	D	L	GF	GA	GD
2	1	1	0	3	1	2	4	1	0	0	3	1	2	0	1	0	0	0	0

==== Matches ====
Date	Time	Opponent	Venue	Result	Scorers	Attendance	TV
1 August 2026	11:00	FC Metaloglobus București	Clinceni Stadium	0–0			
8 August 2026	11:00	CS Afumați	Stadionul Comunal (Afumați)	3–1	David Dumitrescu(og)55, Valentin Robu 70, Claudiu Borțoneanu 79		

=== Cupa României ===
Round	Date	Opponent	Venue	Result	Scorers	Attendance	TV/social media
Third Round	12 August	CSO Băicoi	Stadionul Liliești	2–4	Adrian Moldovan11, Saim Tudor 19,Valentin Robu 47, 89		
Play-off Round	18 August	Gloria Bistrița	Jean Pădureanu Stadium	0–0 (4–1 pen.)			Facebook live | CS Gloria 2018

== Statistics ==
=== Goalscorers ===
Rank	Pos.	Player	Liga II	Cupa României	Total
1	FW		0	0	0
