= List of Latvian football transfers summer 2024 =

This is a list of Latvian football transfers in the summer transfer window 2024 by clubs. Only clubs of the 2024 Latvian Higher League are included.

== Latvian Higher League ==
=== RFS ===
In: Note: Flags indicate national team as defined under FIFA eligibility rules; some limited exceptions apply. Players may hold more than one non-FIFA nationality.

No.	Pos.	Nation	Player
—	GK	CMR	Fabrice Ondoa (from (France) Nîmes)
—	GK	LAT	Sergejs Vilkovs (loan return from Tukums 2000)
—	DF	LAT	Daniels Balodis (from Valmiera)
—	MF	GEO	Luka Silagadze (from Liepāja)
—	MF	UKR	Maksym Derkach (from (Portugal) Estoril)
—	MF	CIV	Mamadou Sylla (from (Ivory Coast) CF CISSE MOHAMED LAMINE)
—	MF	LAT	Jevgēņijs Miņins (loan return from BFC Daugavpils)
—	MF	CGO	Ceti Junior Tchibinda (from (Belgium) Gent)
—	FW	NGR	Victor Osuagwu (from (Czech Republic) SK Slavia Prague B, was on loan at (Czech Republic) Vlašim)
—	FW	BIH	Aleksej Golijanin (loan return from BFC Daugavpils, later loaned to (Serbia) Radnički 1923)

Out: Note: Flags indicate national team as defined under FIFA eligibility rules; some limited exceptions apply. Players may hold more than one non-FIFA nationality.

No.	Pos.	Nation	Player
—	GK	LAT	Jānis Beks (on loan to Tukums 2000)
—	DF	LAT	Dāvis Cucurs (on loan to Tukums 2000)
—	MF	CIV	Mohamed Kone (on loan to BFC Daugavpils)
—	MF	LAT	Gļebs Žaleiko (to BFC Daugavpils)
—	FW	BIH	Aleksej Golijanin (on loan to (Serbia) Radnički 1923, was on loan at BFC Daugavpils)

=== Riga ===
In: Note: Flags indicate national team as defined under FIFA eligibility rules; some limited exceptions apply. Players may hold more than one non-FIFA nationality.

No.	Pos.	Nation	Player
—	DF	LAT	Maksims Semeško (loan return from Metta)
—	MF	CRC	Orlando Galo (on loan from (Costa Rica) Herediano)
—	MF	SEN	Pape Gueye (on loan from (United Arab Emirates) United)
—	MF	GHA	Ahmed Ankrah (from (Slovenia) Koper)
—	MF	NGR	Ibrahim Hussaini (from (Nigeria) Central Football Academy)
—	FW	BRA	Reginaldo (loan return from Auda)
—	FW	CRC	Anthony Contreras (loan return from (Cyprus) Pafos)

Out: Note: Flags indicate national team as defined under FIFA eligibility rules; some limited exceptions apply. Players may hold more than one non-FIFA nationality.

No.	Pos.	Nation	Player
—	DF	CRO	Petar Bosančić (to Auda)
—	MF	BRA	Lucas Cardoso (loan return to (Brazil) Cuiabá)
—	MF	NGR	Alexander Olabanjo Ogunji (to Auda)
—	MF	SEN	Ousseynou Niang (to (Belgium) Royale Union Saint-Gilloise)
—	FW	NGR	Abdulrahman Taiwo (on loan to Auda)
—	FW	PER	Luis Iberico (to (Peru) Sporting Cristal)

=== Auda ===
In: Note: Flags indicate national team as defined under FIFA eligibility rules; some limited exceptions apply. Players may hold more than one non-FIFA nationality.

No.	Pos.	Nation	Player
—	DF	CRO	Petar Bosančić (from Riga FC)
—	DF	SLO	Tin Hrvoj (from (Slovenia) Radomlje)
—	MF	CIV	Abdoul Kader Traore (loan return from Daugavpils)
—	MF	NGR	Alexander Olabanjo Ogunji (from Riga FC)
—	FW	NGR	Abdulrahman Taiwo (on loan from Riga FC)
—	MF	HAI	Jeudi Stevenson (loan return from Tukums 2000)

Out: Note: Flags indicate national team as defined under FIFA eligibility rules; some limited exceptions apply. Players may hold more than one non-FIFA nationality.

No.	Pos.	Nation	Player
—	DF	FRA	Wilguens Paugain (to (Austria) SKN St. Pölten)
—	DF	LAT	Ivo Minkevics (on loan to Metta/LU)
—	MF	LAT	Arturs Krancmanis (on loan to Tukums 2000)
—	MF	LAT	Vladimirs Stepanovs (to Tukums 2000)
—	FW	BRA	Reginaldo (loan return to Riga FC)

=== Valmiera ===
In: Note: Flags indicate national team as defined under FIFA eligibility rules; some limited exceptions apply. Players may hold more than one non-FIFA nationality.

No.	Pos.	Nation	Player
—	DF	LAT	Normunds Uldriķis (from Liepāja)
—	FW	JPN	Shuhei Kawasaki (from (Portugal) Portimonense)

Out: Note: Flags indicate national team as defined under FIFA eligibility rules; some limited exceptions apply. Players may hold more than one non-FIFA nationality.

No.	Pos.	Nation	Player
—	DF	UKR	Roman Yakuba (to (Poland) Puszcza, previously on loan)
—	DF	LAT	Daniels Balodis (to RFS)
—	MF	BIH	Rifet Kapic (to (Poland) Lechia Gdańsk, previously on loan)
—	MF	UKR	Artem Mylchenko (to (Georgia (country)) Dinamo Batumi)
—	FW	BRA	Léo Gaúcho (to (Indonesia) Borneo)

=== Liepāja ===
In: Note: Flags indicate national team as defined under FIFA eligibility rules; some limited exceptions apply. Players may hold more than one non-FIFA nationality.

No.	Pos.	Nation	Player
—	GK	GEO	Lazare Kupatadze (from (Georgia (country)) Iberia 1999)
—	GK	MNE	Danijel Petković (from (Hungary) Kisvárda)
—	DF	MNE	Marko Simić (from (Montenegro) Sutjeska)
—	DF	MNE	Anto Babić (from (Montenegro) Sutjeska)
—	DF	MNE	Luka Uskoković (from (Slovenia) Maribor)
—	DF	GEO	Nikoloz Chikovani (from (Georgia (country)) Sioni Bolnisi)
—	MF	LAT	Roberts Meļķis (loan return from Grobiņa)
—	MF	JPN	Yasuhiro Hanada (loan return from Grobiņa, later to Jelgava)
—	MF	SEN	Pape Doudou (loan return from Grobiņa)
—	MF	SRB	Stefan Purtić (from (Serbia) Železničar)
—	MF	CRO	Marin Lausic (from (Slovenia) Maribor)
—	MF	MTN	Amar Haidara (from (Senegal) Diambars, later on loan at Jelgava)
—	FW	LAT	Artūrs Karašausks (from (Cyprus) Ypsonas Krasava)
—	FW	GHA	Arcadio Baidoo (from (Lithuania) Sirijus)
—	FW	NED	Kyvon Leidsman (from (Georgia (country)) Dila Gori)
—	FW	BIH	Almir Aganspahic (from (North Macedonia) Shkendija)
—	FW	LAT	Emīls Evelons (from (Slovenia) Domžale U-19)

Out: Note: Flags indicate national team as defined under FIFA eligibility rules; some limited exceptions apply. Players may hold more than one non-FIFA nationality.

No.	Pos.	Nation	Player
—	GK	GEO	Lazare Kupatadze (to (Georgia (country)) Gonio)
—	GK	LAT	Iļja Isajevs (on loan to (Lithuania) Sirijus)
—	DF	AUT	Stipe Vučur (to (Bosnia and Herzegovina) Široki Brijeg)
—	DF	GEO	Vazha Patsatsia (to (Armenia) Alashkert)
—	DF	LAT	Normunds Uldriķis (to Valmiera)
—	DF	LAT	Edgars Ivanovs (on loan to Super Nova)
—	DF	NED	Lassana Faye (to (Iraq) Al-Zawraa)
—	MF	JPN	Yasuhiro Hanada (to Jelgava, was on loan at Grobiņa)
—	MF	GEO	Rati Ardazishvili (to (Georgia (country)) Samtredia)
—	MF	GEO	Georgi Kutsia (to (Ukraine) Veres Rivne)
—	MF	LAT	Artūrs Zjuzins (to BFC Daugavpils)
—	MF	TUN	Fraj Kayramani (Released)
—	MF	GEO	Luka Silagadze (to RFS)
—	MF	LAT	Ivans Patrikejevs (on loan to (Estonia) Nõmme Kalju)
—	MF	MTN	Amar Haidara (on loan to Jelgava)
—	FW	LAT	Armans Muradjans (on loan to Super Nova)
—	FW	SEN	Rassoul Ba (Released)

=== Jelgava ===
In: Note: Flags indicate national team as defined under FIFA eligibility rules; some limited exceptions apply. Players may hold more than one non-FIFA nationality.

No.	Pos.	Nation	Player
—	GK	LAT	Toms Leitis (from (Republic of Ireland) Shamrock Rovers)
—	DF	LAT	Antons Aleksandrs Dresmanis (from JFC Viola)
—	DF	UKR	Vladyslav Veremeev (from (Slovakia) Michalovce)
—	MF	JPN	Yasuhiro Hanada (from Liepāja, previously on loan at Grobiņa)
—	MF	UKR	Yegor Glushach (from (Czech Republic) FK Hodonín)
—	MF	MTN	Amar Haidara (on loan from Liepāja)
—	MF	UKR	Artem Kholod (from (Bulgaria) Chernomorets Burgas)

Out: Note: Flags indicate national team as defined under FIFA eligibility rules; some limited exceptions apply. Players may hold more than one non-FIFA nationality.

No.	Pos.	Nation	Player
—	GK	LAT	Edgars Andrejevs (Released)

=== Daugavpils ===
In: Note: Flags indicate national team as defined under FIFA eligibility rules; some limited exceptions apply. Players may hold more than one non-FIFA nationality.

No.	Pos.	Nation	Player
—	MF	CIV	Mohamed Kone (on loan from RFS)
—	MF	LAT	Artūrs Zjuzins (from Liepāja)
—	MF	LAT	Gļebs Žaleiko (from RFS)
—	FW	LAT	Armans Galajs (to (Slovenia) Fužinar)

Out: Note: Flags indicate national team as defined under FIFA eligibility rules; some limited exceptions apply. Players may hold more than one non-FIFA nationality.

No.	Pos.	Nation	Player
—	MF	CIV	Abdoul Kader Traore (loan return to Auda)
—	MF	LAT	Jevgēņijs Miņins (loan return to RFS)
—	MF	LAT	Milans Tihanovičs (to Super Nova)
—	FW	BIH	Aleksej Golijanin (loan return to RFS, later loaned to (Serbia) Radnički 1923)

=== Tukums 2000 ===
In: Note: Flags indicate national team as defined under FIFA eligibility rules; some limited exceptions apply. Players may hold more than one non-FIFA nationality.

No.	Pos.	Nation	Player
—	GK	LAT	Jānis Beks (on loan from RFS)
—	DF	LAT	Dāvis Cucurs (on loan from RFS)
—	DF	SEN	Arona Fall (from (United Arab Emirates) United)
—	MF	CMR	Karl Gameni Wassom (on loan from Riga II)
—	MF	LAT	Arturs Krancmanis (on loan from Auda)
—	MF	LAT	Vladimirs Stepanovs (from Auda)
—	MF	LAT	Dans Sirbu (from Metta/LU)
—		LAT	Rems Gastons Dzeguze (from Super Nova)

Out: Note: Flags indicate national team as defined under FIFA eligibility rules; some limited exceptions apply. Players may hold more than one non-FIFA nationality.

No.	Pos.	Nation	Player
—	GK	LAT	Sergejs Vilkovs (loan return to RFS)
—	GK	LAT	Ruslans Šemetovs (loan return to Riga II)
—	MF	UKR	Maksym Parkhomenko (loan return to Riga II)
—	MF	HAI	Jeudi Stevenson (loan return to Auda)

=== Metta ===
In: Note: Flags indicate national team as defined under FIFA eligibility rules; some limited exceptions apply. Players may hold more than one non-FIFA nationality.

No.	Pos.	Nation	Player
—	GK	LAT	Ņikita Parfjonovs (loan return from (Cyprus) Akritas)
—	DF	LAT	Ivo Minkevics (on loan from Auda)
—	DF	ITA	Gianluca Scremin (from (Italy) Lumezzane)
—	MF	LAT	Kristaps Grabovskis (on loan from Austria Wien II)
—	FW	LAT	Artjoms Puzirevskis (loan return from (North Macedonia) Tikvesh)

Out: Note: Flags indicate national team as defined under FIFA eligibility rules; some limited exceptions apply. Players may hold more than one non-FIFA nationality.

No.	Pos.	Nation	Player
—	DF	LAT	Maksims Semeško (loan return to Riga)
—	MF	LAT	Dans Sirbu (to Tukums 2000)

=== Grobiņa ===
In: Note: Flags indicate national team as defined under FIFA eligibility rules; some limited exceptions apply. Players may hold more than one non-FIFA nationality.

No.	Pos.	Nation	Player
—	DF	AZE	Nazim Mammadzada (from (Azerbaijan) MOİK)
—	MF	GBS	Helistano Ciro Manga (from (Finland) FC Jazz)
—	MF	COL	Diego Machado Renteria (Free agent)
—	MF	LAT	Ingars Sarmis Stuglis (from (Norway) HIF/Stein)
—	MF	COL	Dairon Mosquera (from (Colombia) Orsomarso)
—	MF	ITA	Zakaria Sdaigui (from (Italy) Campobasso)

Out: Note: Flags indicate national team as defined under FIFA eligibility rules; some limited exceptions apply. Players may hold more than one non-FIFA nationality.

No.	Pos.	Nation	Player
—	DF	MDA	Artiom Rozgoniuc (to (Moldova) Zimbru Chișinău)
—	MF	LAT	Roberts Meļķis (loan return to Liepāja)
—	MF	JPN	Yasuhiro Hanada (loan return to Liepāja)
—	MF	SEN	Pape Doudou (loan return to Liepāja)
