= FC Petrolul Berca =

- Full name: Fotbal Club Petrolul Berca
- Nickname: Lupii Albaștri (Blue Wolves)
- Founded: 1948
- Ground: Petrolul, Berca
- Capacity: 2.000
- Chairman: Valentin Tătulescu
- Manager: Ionuț Damir
- League: Liga III
- 2025–26: 1
Home colours	Away colours

Fotbal Club Petrolul Berca, known as Petrolul Berca, is a romanian football club from Berca, Buzău, currently playing in Liga III, the third tier of Romanian football.

== History ==
The club was founded in 1948 under the name Steaua Berca. A year later, it changed its name to Flacăra Berca, and in 1959 to Petrolul Berca.

The club played in the district and regional championships until 1968. At the end of the 1967–68 season, Petrolul finished the championship in 2nd place in the East Series of the Ploiești regional championship and was promoted for the first time to Divizia C.

In the Divizia C, with one exception in the 1973–74 season, when they finished in 5th place, Petrolul often finished in the second half of the standings, struggling to avoid relegation, 10th place (1968–69), 14th place (1968–70), 15th place (1970–71) saved from relegation due to the expansion of the Divizia C, 10th place (1971–72), 10th place (1972–73), 10th place (1974–75), which finally happened at the end of the 1975–76 season when they finished in 15th place.

At the end of the 1993–94 season, they managed to promote to Divizia B, but were penalized by the Romanian Football Federation with 8 points for match-fixing, Poiana Câmpina being promoted afterwards. They managed to reach the round of 16 of the Romanian Cup twice (1993/94; 1998/99).

After a long evolution in Divizia C, at the end of the 2005–06 season, the team was relegated to Divizia D Buzău. In the 2015–16 season, Petrolul Berca won the Liga IV Buzău with maximum points, and in the play-off they passed the champion of Covasna county, Nemere Ghelința after 4–2 and 0–1, winning again the right to play in the Liga III. However, the team withdrew for financial reasons and returned to the Liga IV, finishing the following year in 3rd place, after Metalul Buzău and Team Săgeata.

In the 2017–18 season, the team finished in 11th place in the Liga IV Buzău.

The team from Berca produced players like Marian Alexandru (goalkeeper – played at Farul Constanța), Daniel Petre, Dorel Constantin, Adrian Soigan, Ștefan Dogaru, Vasile Busuioc, Costel Alutei, Ene Alexandru, Pascu Danut, Ene and Pascu former juniors at FC Dinamo București.

== Honours ==
- Liga IV Buzău
  - Winners (6): 1980–1981, 1985–1986, 1993–94, 2003–04, 2015–16, 2025–26
  - Runners-up (3): 1971–72, 1978–79, 2014–15
- Liga V Buzău
  - Winners (1): 2011–12
- Cupa României – Buzău County
  - Winners (2): 1993–94, 2015–16
- Cupa României
  - Round of 16 (2): 1993–94, 1998–99

== Club officials ==
=== Board of directors ===
Chairman	(Romania) Valentin Tătulescu
President	(Romania) Florin-Liviu Neagu
Secretary	(Romania) Alin Zamfira
Vice-president	(Romania) Ionuț Modruj
Competition organizer	(Romania) Andrei Vișan

=== Current technical staff ===
Head coach	(Romania) Ionuț Damir
Assistant coach	(Romania) Florian Ghica
Youth Coach	(Romania) Florian Ghica
Doctor	(Romania) Adelin Popa

== Former Players ==
- (Romania) Vasile Burgă
- (Romania) Ciprian Petre
- (Romania) Daniel Petre
- (Romania) Cosmin Elisei
- (Romania) Florin Sava
- (Romania) Cătălin Marchidanu
- (Romania) Remus Cristofan
- (Romania) Cristian Deaconu
- (Romania) Marian Ionașcu
- (Romania) Gabriel Ibriș
- (Romania) Dan Paveliuc
- (Romania) George Timiș
- (Romania) Daniel Pleșa
- (Romania) Ion Profir
- (Romania) Ion Celpan
- (Romania) Valentin Calafantea
- (Romania) Valentin Untaru
- (Romania) Sergiu Ghițulescu
- (Romania) Romeo Bunica
- (Romania) Marian Aluței
- (Romania) Pandele

== Former coaches ==
- (Romania) Vasile Grosu
- (Romania) Ion Cojocaru
- (Romania) Ion Viorel
- (Romania) Romeo Bunica
- (Romania) Ion Ioniță
- (Romania) Vasile Lazar
- (Romania) Claudiu Vaiscovici
