= Ureche =

Ureche is a surname. Notable people with the surname include:

- Andrei Ureche (born 1998), Romanian footballer
- Diana Ureche (born 1974), Romanian butterfly and freestyle swimmer
- Grigore Ureche (1590–1647), Moldavian chronicler
