= Inter Gaz Stadium =

Multi-use stadium in Romania

- Interactive map of Inter Gaz Stadium
- Address: Str. Leordeni
- Location: Popești-Leordeni, Romania
- Coordinates: 44°22′36.3″N 26°12′14.1″E
- Owner: Town of Popești-Leordeni
- Operator: SC Popești-Leordeni
- Capacity: 2,000 (1,000 seated)
- Surface: Grass

Construction
- Opened: 1985

Tenants
- Inter Gaz București (1994–2009); Viitorul Toporu (2009–2010); Rapid II București (2011–2012); SC Popești-Leordeni (2012–present)

The Inter Gaz Stadium is a multi-use stadium in Popești-Leordeni, Romania. It is currently used mostly for football matches and is the home ground of SC Popești-Leordeni. The stadium holds 2,000 people.
