= Cristian Bădiliță =

Romanian poet (born 1968)

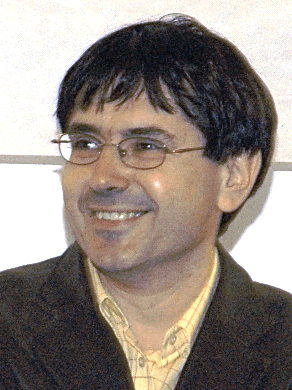
- Born: March 27, 1968 (age 58); Săveni, Botoșani County, Socialist Republic of Romania
- Education: University of Bucharest; Paris-Sorbonne University
- Occupations: Theologian, essayist, translator, poet
- Website: www.cristianbadilita.ro

Cristian Bădiliță (born March 27, 1968) is a theologian, essayist, translator and contemporary Romanian poet.

== Biography ==
He holds a Ph.D. in ancient history of Christianity from the University Paris IV Sorbonne, with thesis "Les métamorphoses de l'Antichrist chez les Pères de l'Eglise".

== Works ==
=== Publications ===
- Știință dragoste credință: pe viu despre părinții bisericii (in Romanian). București: Editura Vremea. 2021. ISBN 978-606-081-060-5. OCLC 1289780943.
- Fructele absenței: surâsuri și exorcizări (in Romanian) (2nd revised ed.). București: Editura Vremea. 2021. ISBN 978-606-081-059-9. OCLC 1291617309.
- Finger on the Wound and other Antipolitical Disintoxications (Vremea, 2011)
- Guide of Antichristology. Studies, translations and commentaries (Second Edition, Vremea, 2011)
- Landscape with Ape and Angel. Apocryphal letters of Archibald's de la Cruz (Limes, 2011)
- Patristique et oecuménisme. Themes, contextes, personnages (Beauchesne, 2010)
- Seraphita- Concerto for harp and guillotine (Gutenberg Galaxy, 2010)
- Small Book of Heresies (Gutenberg Galaxy, 2010)
- Asceticism and Childhood - Visible and Invisible Things of the Ascetic Childhood (Editura Curtea Veche, 2010)
- Kordian Gnot (sic!) (Galaxia Gutenberg, 2009)
- Seraphita- Concerto for harp and guillotine (Curtea Veche, 2009)
- Orthodoxy versus Orthodoxy (Curtea Veche, 2009)
- Science, Love, Faith - Conversations with European Patrologists (Curtea Veche, 2008)
- Glaphyra. Nine Biblical and Patristic studies (Polirom, 2008)
- God of Mancha sleeping with his cracked temple on my shoulder (Curtea Veche, 2008)
- Sacred and Melancholy (ed. II, Dacia, 2007)
- Platonopolis or Reconciliation with Philosophy (ed. II, Curtea Veche, 2007)
- The Loneliness of a Migratory Bird (Curtea Veche, 2007)
- Poems for Birds and Aliens (Curtea Veche, 2007)
- Metamorphoses of Antichrist in the Church Fathers’, translated by Teodora Ioniță (Polirom, 2006)
- Les Pères de l'Église d'aujourd'hui dans le monde (with Charles Kannengiesser, Beauchesne, 2006)
- Temptation of Misanthropy. Stromateis (Edition II, Curtea Veche, 2006)
- King with Harp in Hand (ed. II, Old Court, 2006)
- Finger on the Wound (Curtea Veche, 2006)
- Les métamorphoses de l'Antichrist chez les Peres de l'Eglise (Beauchesne, 2005)
- MicroRevelation (Curtea Veche, 2005)
- Arcimboldo's Sunday (Brumar, 2004)
- Gordian Knot (ed III, Curtea Veche, 2004)
- Visible and Invisible Things (Curtea Veche, 2004)
- Jean Cassien entre l'Orient et l'Occident (with Attila Jakab, Beauchesne, 2003)
- Mircea Eliade. Encounter with the Sacred (ed. II, Echinox, 2001)
- Death and the Monk (Polirom, 1998)
- Myths of Plato (Humanitas, 1996)

=== Editions and anthologies ===
- Les Pères de l'Église d'aujourd'hui dans le monde (Paris, 2006); in collaboration with Charles Kannengiesser
- St. Gregory of Nyssa – Life of St. Macrina (Anastasia, 2004);
- Jean Cassien entre l'Orient et l'Occident (Ed. Beauchesne / Polirom, 2003); in collaboration with Attila Jakab
- Europe's Nostalgia. Volume in honor of Al. Paleologu (Polirom, 2003); in collaboration with Tudorel Urian
- About Absolute Love. Commentary on the First Epistle of John (Polirom, 2003)
- Mircea Eliade. Encounter with the sacred (Edition II, Equinox, 2001)
- Socrates, the Man (Humanitas, 1996)
- Myths of Plato (Humanitas, 1996)

=== Commented Translations from Greek and Latin ===
- New Testament – Gospel of John, bilingual edition, Volume II (Editura Curtea Veche, 2010)
- New Testament – Matthew, bilingual edition, Volume I (Curtea Veche, 2009)
- Three Mystical Novels of Antiquity - Joseph and Aseneth, Testament of Job, Testament of Abraham (Second Edition Revised, Curtea Veche, 2008)
- Apocryphal Gospels (ed. IV, Polirom, 2007)
- Patericon (ed. III, Polirom, 2007)
- Evagrius of Pontus, practical Treaty. Gnostic (second edition, Polirom, 2003)
- Three of the Old Testament Apocrypha (Polirom, 2000)
- Apocalypse of Paul (Polirom, 1999); in collaboration with Smaranda Bădiliță
