= Sorin Colceag =

Romanian footballer

Personal information
- Full name: Sorin Dorel Colceag
- Date of birth: 11 March 1972 (age 54)
- Place of birth: Buzău, Romania
- Height: 1.93 m (6 ft 4 in)
- Position: Goalkeeper

Team information
- Current team: Sepsi OSK (assistant)

Youth career
- –1988: Unirea Focșani

Senior career*
Years	Team	Apps	(Gls)
1988	Unirea Focșani		
1989–1990	Dinamo București	1	(0)
1990–1994	Universitatea Cluj	95	(0)
1994–1995	Național București	33	(0)
1996	Rocar București	5	(0)
1996–1998	NK Zagreb	18	(0)
1999	→ Politehnica Iași (loan)		
1999	→ Lokeren (loan)		
2000	NK Zagreb	9	(0)
2000	Tigres Ciudad de Juarez		
2001	Argeș Pitești	31	(0)
2002	Diplomatic Focșani	14	(0)
2002–2004	Viktoria Plzeň	47	(0)
2004	Panionios	3	(0)
2005	Panserraikos	30	(0)
2006	FC Brașov	0	(0)
Total		286	(0)

International career
1992–1993	Romania U21	14	(0)

Managerial career
- 2009–2010: Gheorghe Hagi Academy (GK coordinator)
- 2010–2013: Viitorul Constanța (GK coach)
- 2013–2014: Gloria Popești-Leordeni
- 2014: Universitatea Cluj (assistant)
- 2015–2016: Metaloglobus București
- 2016–2017: Romania U16
- 2017–2018: Romania U17
- 2018–2019: Zimbru Chișinău
- 2019–2020: Popești-Leordeni
- 2021–2022: Dinamo II București
- 2021: Dinamo București (caretaker)
- 2022–2024: Dinamo București (assistant)
- 2024: CSM Focșani
- 2024–2025: AFC Câmpulung Muscel
- 2025–: Sepsi OSK (assistant)
- * Club domestic league appearances and goals

Sorin Dorel Colceag (born 11 March 1972) is a Romanian professional football manager and former player, currently assistant coach at Liga I club Sepsi OSK.

== Club career ==
During his career Colceag played with Unirea Focșani, Dinamo București, Universitatea Cluj, Național București, Rocar București, Croatian NK Zagreb, Politehnica Iași, Belgian Lokeren, Mexican Tigres Ciudad de Juarez, Argeș Pitești, Czech Viktoria Plzeň, Greek clubs Panionios and Panserraikos and finished his career back in Romania with FC Brașov in 2006.

== International career ==
Colceag made 14 appearances for Romania U21 in 1992 and 1993.

== Personal life ==
He is married to former Romanian international basketball player Daniela Moroșanu. Their son, Luca (born 2003), is a current college basketball player who has competed for the Montana State Bobcats (2022–23), Eastern Florida State College (2023–24), Northern Colorado Bears (2024–25), and UT Martin Skyhawks (2025–present).

== Honours ==
Dinamo București

- Divizia A: 1989–90

Universitatea Cluj

- Divizia B: 1991–92

Viktoria Plzeň

- Czech 2. Liga: 2002–03

== External sources ==
- Sorin Colceag at WorldFootball.net
