= Marian Vlada =

Romanian footballer

Personal information
- Date of birth: 8 December 1987 (age 38)
- Place of birth: București, Romania
- Height: 1.88 m (6 ft 2 in)
- Position: Forward

Team information
- Current team: Popești-Leordeni
- Number: 19

Youth career
- 1998–2006: Rapid București

Senior career*
Years	Team	Apps	(Gls)
2011–2017	Afumați	85	(74)
2018–2019	Rapid București	46	(37)
2019–2021	Slatina	28	(8)
2021–2024	Popești-Leordeni	44	(39)
- * Club domestic league appearances and goals as of 22:21, 13 January 2024 (UTC)

Marian Vlada (born 8 December 1987) is a Romanian footballer who plays as a forward for SC Popești-Leordeni.

== Honours ==
CS Afumați

- Liga III: 2015–16
- Liga IV – Ilfov County: 2010–11

Rapid București

- Liga III: 2018–19
- Liga IV – Bucharest: 2017–18

CSM Slatina

- Liga III: 2019–20
