= Răzvan Began =

Romanian footballer

Personal information
- Full name: Răzvan Cătălin Began
- Date of birth: 12 August 1996 (age 30)
- Place of birth: Sighetu Marmației, Romania
- Height: 1.93 m (6 ft 4 in)
- Position: Goalkeeper

Team information
- Current team: Popești-Leordeni
- Number: 12

Youth career
- –2016: CFR Cluj

Senior career*
Years	Team	Apps	(Gls)
2015–2016	CFR Cluj	0	(0)
2015	→ CSM Sighetu Marmației (loan)		
2016	→ Farul Constanța (loan)	1	(0)
2017	Luceafărul Oradea	8	(0)
2017–2018	Foresta Suceava	28	(0)
2018	Hermannstadt	0	(0)
2019	ACS Poli Timișoara	1	(0)
2019–2020	Daco-Getica București	8	(0)
2020–2021	Dunărea Călărași	19	(0)
2021–2023	Sepsi OSK	9	(0)
2023	Botoșani	1	(0)
2023–2024	Dinamo București	0	(0)
2024–2026	Gloria Bistrița	0	(0)
2026	Minaur Baia Mare		
2026–	Popești-Leordeni	0	(0)

International career
2014	Romania U19	2	(0)
- * Club domestic league appearances and goals as of 4 November 2026

Răzvan Cătălin Began (born 12 August 1996) is a Romanian professional footballer who plays as a goalkeeper for Liga II club Popești-Leordeni.

== Club career ==
=== Sepsi OSK ===
He made his Liga I debut for Sepsi OSK against Dinamo București on 31 October 2021.

== Honours ==
Sepsi OSK

- Cupa României: 2021–22, 2022–23
- Supercupa României: 2022

Gloria Bistrița

- Liga III: 2024–25
