= SC Popești-Leordeni =

Romanian football club

- Full name: Sport Club Popești-Leordeni
- Nicknames: Alb-roșii (The White and Reds)
- Short name: Popești-Leordeni
- Founded: 2011; 15 years ago as Clubul Sportiv Popești-Leordeni
- Ground: Inter Gaz / Clinceni
- Capacity: 2,000 / 4,500
- Owner: Popești-Leordeni Town
- Chairman: Valentin Boiangiu
- Head coach: Cătălin Gheorghe
- League: Liga II
- 2025–26: Liga III, Series III; Regular season: 2nd of 12; Play-off, Series II: 2nd of 8 (promoted via play-offs)
- Website: scpopestileordeni.com
Home colours	Away colours

Sport Club Popești-Leordeni, commonly known as SC Popești-Leordeni or simply Popești-Leordeni, is a Romanian professional football club based in Popești-Leordeni, Ilfov County, which currently competes in Liga II, the second tier of Romanian football.

Founded in 2011 as CS Popești-Leordeni, the club, located near Bucharest, merged in 2013 with newly promoted side Gloria Cornești, taking its place in Liga III under the name Gloria Popești-Leordeni. It was renamed SC Popești-Leordeni in 2016 and, after thirteen consecutive seasons in the third tier, achieved its first-ever promotion to Liga II after winning the promotion play-offs in 2026.

== History ==
The club was founded in 2011 under the name Club Sportiv Popești-Leordeni, with the aim of reviving senior football in the town following the dissolution in 2009 of Inter Gaz București and Viscofil Popești-Leordeni. The initiative was led by Petre Iacob, the future mayor of Popești-Leordeni, alongside Liviu Mirea and Petre Tănase, with the newly formed team being composed exclusively of local players.

The team was enrolled in Liga V Ilfov County, the fifth tier of the Romanian football league system and the second level of county football. In its debut season, under head coach Petre Pașculea, the White and Reds won the competition and secured promotion to Liga IV Ilfov County.

In the 2012–13 season, the team moved to the newly renovated Inter Gaz Stadium, with Petre Pașculea serving as technical director. The team was coached by Aurel Ungureanu until April 2013, when, following a short interim spell under Nicolae Laicu, former Romanian international Adrian Iencsi was appointed head coach, leading the team to a 2nd place finish both in the regular season and after the county play-off. The squad included among others Ed. Voicu, C. Nicolae, Popică, Moldoveanu, Țane, N. Dumitru, Oancea, C. Cristea, Zaharia, Nicolescu, C. Ene, Bernard, Șt. Alexandru, R. Gheorghe, Stoican, Ov. Dumitrescu, M. Ștefan, B. Nicu and Ciubeică.

However, in 2013, the club merged with Gloria Cornești, a newly promoted side from Liga IV Dâmbovița County, taking its place in Liga III under the name Gloria Popești-Leordeni and appointing Sorin Colceag as the new head coach. Competing in Series II, Gloria finished 5th in the regular season and qualified for the play-off round, where it ended the 2013–14 campaign in 6th place. Colceag left the Ilfov-based side during the summer break to join top-flight club Universitatea Cluj as an assistant coach and was replaced by Tudorel Stanciu, who guided the team to a 7th-place finish in the 2014–15 season.

During the winter break of the 2015–16 season, amid financial difficulties and administrative issues related to the club's funding, Gloria turned to local youngsters for the second half of the campaign, while Tudorel Stanciu was replaced by Viorel Dinu, who took over as player-coach and guided the team to an 11th-place finish.

In the following season, Popești-Leordeni started with Gabriel Ilaș as head coach, who led the team to the fourth round of the Cupa României before being replaced by Dan Păun during the first half of the campaign. Viorel Dinu took over during the winter break and guided the team to a 6th-place finish in Series II.

== Grounds ==
In the first year of existence, SC Popești-Leordeni played its home matches on Viscofil Stadium, in Popești-Leordeni, with a capacity of 3,000 people, then moving on Inter Gaz Stadium, after its renovation. Inter Gaz Stadium has a capacity of 1,000 seats and was the home ground of defunct Inter Gaz București.

== Chronology of names ==
Name	Period
CS Popești-Leordeni	2011–2013
Gloria Popești-Leordeni	2013–2016
SC Popești-Leordeni	2016–present

== Honours ==
Liga III

- Winners (1): 2024–25
- Runners-up (4): 2021–22, 2022–23, 2023–24, 2025–26

Liga IV – Ilfov County

- Runners-up (1): 2012–13

Liga V – Ilfov County

- Winners (1): 2011–12

Cupa României – Ilfov County

- Winners (1): 2012–13

== Players ==
=== First-team squad ===
As of 30 October 2026

Note: Flags indicate national team as defined under FIFA eligibility rules; some limited exceptions apply. Players may hold more than one non-FIFA nationality.

No.	Pos.	Nation	Player
1	GK	ROU	Marc Radulescu
3	DF	ROU	Andrei Bobaru
4	DF	ROU	Nicolae Leafu
5	MF	ROU	Eric Damașcan (on loan from FCSB)
6	MF	NGR	Raji Ayomide (on loan from Universitatea Cluj)
7	FW	ROU	Robert Mustacă
8	MF	ROU	Cristian Balgiu (Captain)
9	FW	ROU	Alexandru Dane
10	MF	ROU	Leonard Boiangiu
11	MF	ROU	Marius Tudorică (Vice-captain)
12	GK	ROU	Răzvan Began
13	FW	CMR	Wilfred Njindja
14	DF	ROU	Alexandru Gheorghe
15	MF	ROU	Adrian Căpraru
16	DF	ROU	Răzvan Iacob
17	MF	ROU	Robert Enache
18	MF	ROU	Patrick Mutu

No.	Pos.	Nation	Player
19	DF	ROU	Ionuț Nadolu
20	DF	ROU	Andrei Sin
21	MF	ROU	Luca Pătrășcoiu (3rd captain)
23	MF	ROU	Andrei Sora
24	FW	NGR	Quadri Taiwo (on loan from Universitatea Cluj)
25	FW	ROU	Mihai Ion
26	MF	ROU	Denis Ciobanu (on loan from Politehnica Iași)
27	MF	ROU	Nicușor Fota
28	MF	ROU	Bogdan Fîrținescu
29	FW	ROU	Mihai Neicuțescu
30	DF	ROU	Alexandru Nicola
45	DF	ROU	Ștefan Duțu (on loan from Farul Constanța)
90	GK	ROU	Alexandru Achiriloaiei
—	DF	ROU	Alexandru Dumitru
—	FW	NGR	Nnochiri Kelechi
—	FW	ROU	Darius Dobrean

=== Out on loan ===
Note: Flags indicate national team as defined under FIFA eligibility rules; some limited exceptions apply. Players may hold more than one non-FIFA nationality.

No.	Pos.	Nation	Player
—	DF	ROU	Vlad Cristea (at Tunari until 30 June 2027)
—	MF	ROU	Cosmin Olteanu (at Progresul Fundulea until 30 June 2027)

No.	Pos.	Nation	Player
—	MF	ROU	Alexandru Dumitru (at Omega Sport until 30 June 2027)

== Club officials ==
=== Board of directors ===
Role	Name
Owner	(Romania) Popești-Leordeni Town
President	(Romania) Valentin Boiangiu
Executive president	(Romania) Paul Terteleac
Sporting director	(Romania) Petre Pașculea
Team Manager	(Romania) Alin Pătrașcu

=== Current technical staff ===
Role	Name
Head coach	(Romania) Cătălin Gheorghe
Assistant coach	(Romania) Cristian Popescu
Goalkeeping coach	(Romania) Cristian Popescu
Fitness coach	(Romania) Nicușor Dumitru
Kinetotherapist	(Romania) Mihai Loțan
Kit man	(Romania) Marian Ionică

== Notable former players ==
The footballers enlisted below have had international cap(s) for their respective countries at junior and/or senior level and/or significant caps for SC Popești-Leordeni.

Romania

- (Romania) Angelo Anghelini
- (Romania) Gabriel Bragă
- (Romania) Viorel Dinu
- (Romania) Alexandru Dragomir
- (Romania) Nicușor Dumitru
- (Romania) Robert Gheorghe
- (Romania) Vlad Ghineț
- (Romania) Filip Ilie
- (Romania) Mihai Lolescu
- (Romania) Cătălin Marin
- (Romania) Alexandru Mărgărit
- (Romania) Vlad Motroc
- (Romania) Mădălin Mustață
- (Romania) Valentin Niculae
- (Romania) Cosmin Novac
- (Romania) Andrei Parcea
- (Romania) Alin Pătrașcu
- (Romania) Alexandru Păun
- (Romania) Andrei Tudor
- (Romania) Alin Turbatu
- (Romania) Marian Vlada
- (Romania) Andrei Voican

France

- (France) Onur Kaplan

== Former managers ==
- (Romania) Petre Pașculea (2011–2012)
- (Romania) Aurel Ungureanu (2012–2013)
- (Romania) Nicolae Laicu (2013) (interim)
- (Romania) Adrian Iencsi (2013)
- (Romania) Sorin Colceag (2013–2014)
- (Romania) Tudorel Stanciu (2014–2015)
- (Romania) Viorel Dinu (2016)
- (Romania) Gabriel Ilaș (2016)
- (Romania) Dan Păun (2016)
- (Romania) Viorel Dinu (2017–2019)
- (Romania) Sorin Colceag (2019–2020)
- (Romania) Valentin Ivan (2020–2023)
- (Romania) Andrei Cristea (2023–2025)

== League and cup history ==
Season	Tier	League	Regular season	Play-off / Play-out	Notes	Cupa României
2026–27	2	Liga II	TBD			Play-off round
2025–26	3	Liga III	2nd (Series III)	2nd (Series II)	Promoted	Third round
2024–25	3	Liga III	1st (Series III)	1st (C) (Series III)		Play-off round
2023–24	3	Liga III	2nd (Series IV)	2nd (Series IV)		
2022–23	3	Liga III	2nd (Series IV)	2nd (Series IV)		
2021–22	3	Liga III	2nd (Series III)	2nd (Series III)		Third round
2020–21	3	Liga III	3rd (Series III)	–		Third round
2019–20	3	Liga III	6th (Series II)	–		Fourth round
2018–19	3	Liga III	5th (Series II)	–		Second round
2017–18	3	Liga III	5th (Series III)	–		Second round
2016–17	3	Liga III	6th (Series II)	–		Fourth round
2015–16	3	Liga III	11th (Series II)	–		First round
2014–15	3	Liga III	7th (Series II)	–		First round
2013–14	3	Liga III	5th (Series II)	6th (Series II)		First round
2012–13	4	Liga IV (IF)	2nd	2nd	Promoted (Note: Merged with Gloria Cornești and took its place in Liga III.)	County phase - W
2011–12	5	Liga V (IF)	1st (C)	–	Promoted	County phase - QF
