= Viorel Dinu =

Romanian footballer

Personal information
- Date of birth: 17 March 1980 (age 46)
- Place of birth: Bucharest, Romania
- Height: 1.75 m (5 ft 9 in)
- Position: Striker

Team information
- Current team: FCSB (assistant)

Youth career
- Școala Sportivă Sfântul Pantelimon

Senior career*
Years	Team	Apps	(Gls)
1997–1998	Juventus București	15	(10)
1999–2002	Național București	2	(0)
1999–2000	→ Cimentul Fieni (loan)	10	(1)
2000–2001	→ Juventus București (loan)	20	(3)
2001–2002	→ Dunărea Giurgiu (loan)	?	(?)
2002–2004	Poiana Câmpina	12	(6)
2005	Politehnica Iași	0	(0)
2005–2006	Cetatea Suceava	16	(5)
2006	Chimia Brazi	16	(3)
2007	FC Brașov	6	(0)
2007–2011	Snagov	84	(30)
2012	Concordia Chiajna	13	(4)
2012–2013	Universitatea Cluj	21	(9)
2013–2014	Săgeata Năvodari	21	(5)
2014–2015	Berceni	2	(1)
2015	Gloria Popești-Leordeni		
2016	CS Ștefănești		
2016–2017	Popești-Leordeni		
Total		238+	(77+)

Managerial career
- 2016–2019: Popești-Leordeni
- 2019–2020: Al-Wasl (youth)
- 2021–2022: Universitatea Craiova (assistant)
- 2022–2023: Neftchi Baku (assistant)
- 2024–2025: Espérance de Tunis (assistant)
- 2025–2026: Al Hilal Omdurman (assistant)
- 2026: Espérance de Tunis (assistant)
- 2026–: FCSB (assistant)
- * Club domestic league appearances and goals

Viorel Dinu (born 17 March 1980) is a Romanian former professional footballer who played as a striker, currently assistant coach at Liga I club FCSB.

== Honours ==
FC Snagov

- Liga III: 2007–08
