= Ștefan Duțu =

Romanian footballer (born 2004)

Personal information
- Full name: Alexandru Ștefan Duțu
- Date of birth: 16 February 2004 (age 22)
- Place of birth: Constanța, Romania
- Height: 1.97 m (6 ft 6 in)
- Position: Centre-back

Team information
- Current team: Popești-Leordeni (on loan from Farul Constanța)
- Number: 45

Youth career
- 2013–2023: Gheorghe Hagi Academy

Senior career*
| Years | Team | Apps | (Gls) |
| 2022–2023 | Farul II Constanța | | |
| 2023– | Farul Constanța | 4 | (0) |
| 2023–2025 | → Afumați (loan) | 18 | (2) |
| 2026– | → Popești-Leordeni (loan) | 10 | (1) |

International career^{‡}
| 2021–2022 | Romania U18 | 5 | (0) |
| 2022–2023 | Romania U19 | 3 | (0) |
| 2023–2025 | Romania U20 | 12 | (1) |
| 2025 | Romania U21 | 1 | (0) |
- * Club domestic league appearances and goals as of 31 October 2026 ‡ National team caps and goals as of 9 December 2025

Alexandru Ștefan Duțu (born 16 February 2004) is a Romanian professional footballer who plays as a centre-back for Liga II club Popești-Leordeni, on loan from Liga I club Farul Constanța.

== Honours ==
Afumați

- Liga III: 2023–24
