= Filip Ilie =

Romanian footballer

Personal information
- Full name: Filip Mihai Ilie
- Date of birth: 15 July 2002 (age 24)
- Place of birth: Bucharest, Romania
- Height: 1.88 m (6 ft 2 in)
- Position: Forward

Youth career
- Sport Team București
- –2018: Bayern Munich
- 2018–2020: Gheorghe Hagi Academy
- 2020–2022: Sport Team București

Senior career*
Years	Team	Apps	(Gls)
2022–2024	Sport Team București	0	(0)
2022	→ Sepsi OSK II (loan)		
2023	→ Popești-Leordeni (loan)		
2023–2024	→ Universitatea Cluj (loan)	11	(0)
2024–2025	Unirea Slobozia	20	(1)
2025–2026	Corvinul Hunedoara	29	(8)

International career
2018	Romania U16	1	(0)
2023	Romania U21	1	(0)
- * Club domestic league appearances and goals as of 16 May 2026

Filip Mihai Ilie (born 15 July 2002) is a Romanian professional footballer who plays as a forward.

== Early life ==
Ilie was born in Bucharest and he played for youth academy of Gheorghe Hagi Academy and German club Bayern Munich.

== Club career ==
He made his Liga I debut for Universitatea Cluj on 23 September 2023, in a 1–1 draw to Universitatea Craiova.

== Personal life ==
Filip's mother, Ruxandra Dragomir, is a retired tennis player from Romania.

== Honours ==
Corvinul Hunedoara

- Liga II: 2025–26
