= Denis Ciobanu =

Romanian footballer (born 2004)

Personal information
- Full name: Denis Andrei Ciobanu
- Date of birth: 24 May 2004 (age 22)
- Place of birth: Constanța, Romania
- Height: 1.87 m (6 ft 2 in)
- Position: Central midfielder

Team information
- Current team: Popești-Leordeni (on loan from Politehnica Iași)
- Number: 26

Youth career
- –2017: Gheorghe Hagi Academy
- 2017–2019: FSV Waiblingen
- 2019–2020: Wuppertaler SV
- 2020–2023: Arminia Bielefeld

Senior career*
Years	Team	Apps	(Gls)
2024–	Politehnica Iași	13	(0)
2026–	→ Popești-Leordeni (loan)	8	(0)

International career
2022	Romania U18	1	(0)
- * Club domestic league appearances and goals as of 31 October 2026

Denis Andrei Ciobanu (born 24 May 2004) is a Romanian professional footballer who plays as a central midfielder for Liga II club Popești-Leordeni, on loan from Politehnica Iași.
