= Săveni =

- Town
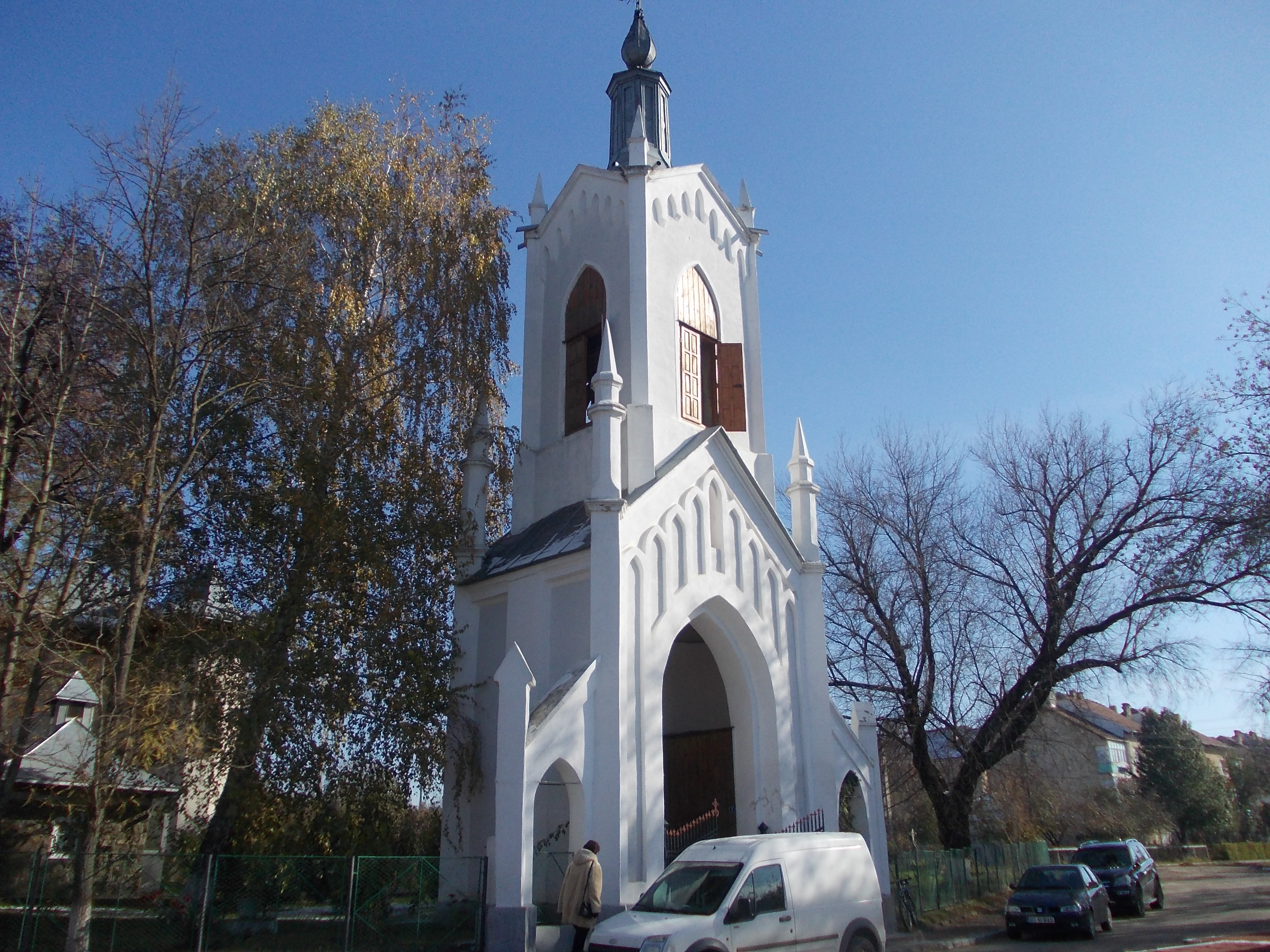

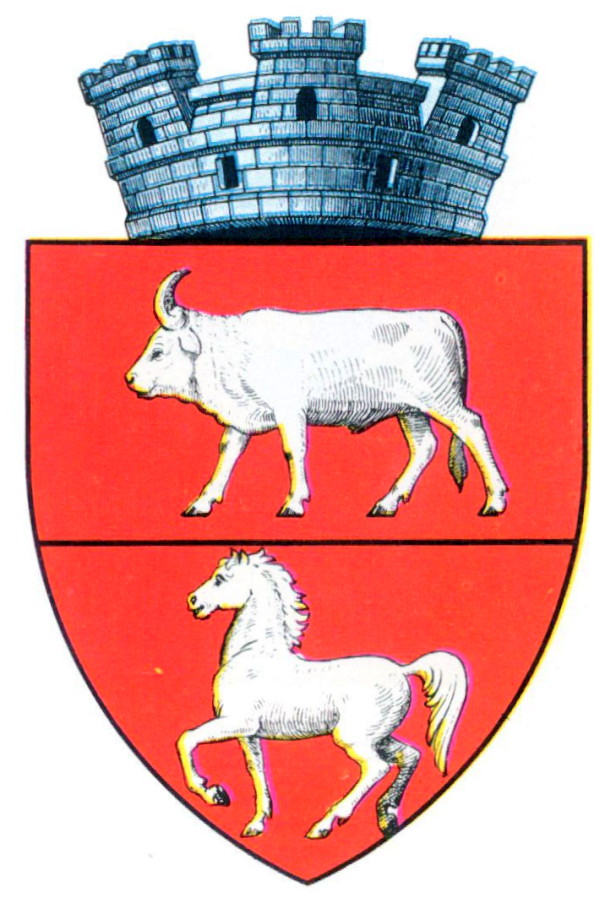
- Coat of arms

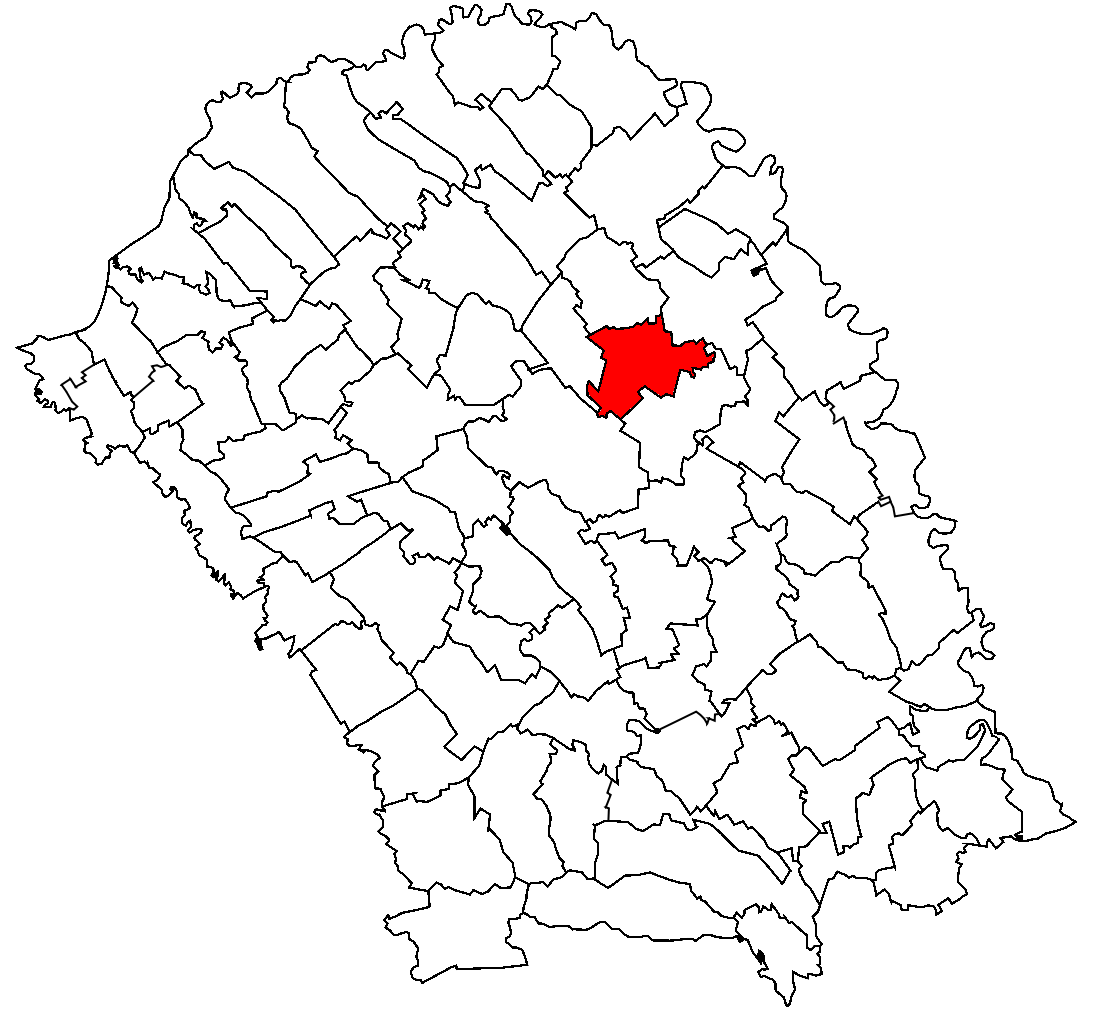
- Location in Botoșani County

- Location in Romania
- Coordinates: 47°57′12″N 26°51′32″E
- Country: Romania
- County: Botoșani

Government
  - Mayor (2024–2028): Petru-Relu Târzioru (PSD)
- Area: 58.66 km^{2} (22.65 sq mi)
- Elevation: 120 m (390 ft)
- Population (2021-12-01): 6,447
  - Density: 109.9/km^{2} (284.7/sq mi)
- Time zone: UTC+02:00 (EET)
  - Summer (DST): UTC+03:00 (EEST)
- Postal code: 715300
- Area code: (+40) 02 31
- Vehicle reg.: BT
- Website: primariasaveni.ro

Săveni is a small town located in Botoșani County in the Western Moldavia region in northeastern Romania. The town administers five villages: Bodeasa, Bozieni, Chișcăreni, Petricani, and Sat Nou.

Near Săveni, at 47°56′2.27″N 26°50′19.58″E, there is a 210 metres (690 feet) tall guyed mast for FM-/TV-broadcasting. The town features two Orthodox churches, the Saint Nicholas Church and the Saint George Church.

The town's main educational centers are the "Școala Gimnazială Nr.1 Săveni" elementary and middle school, with an old decrepit building from the early 1900' which functioned as a Jewish school, and the "Liceul Teoretic Dr. Mihai Ciucă", which is an elementary and high school.

The "Spitalul Orășenesc Săveni" is the local hospital. The old cinema "Patria" was recently rehabilitated with funds and has become a modern "Casă de Cultură". There is an archaeology museum located in the town.

== Natives ==
Historical population
Year	Pop.	±%
1930	4,953	—
1948	6,470	+30.6%
1977	7,345	+13.5%
1992	8,475	+15.4%
2002	8,685	+2.5%
2011	6,999	−19.4%
2021	6,447	−7.9%
Source: Census data

- Cristian Bădiliță (born 1968), theologian and essayist
- Dan Caspi (1945–2017), Israeli academic
- Mihai Ciucă (1883–1969), bacteriologist
- Claudiu Juncănaru (born 1996), footballer
- Sammy Lerner (1903–1989), American songwriter
- Alexandru Țigănașu (born 1990), footballer
