= Valentin Stan =

Romanian footballer and manager

Personal information
- Full name: Valentin Adrian Stan
- Date of birth: 12 September 1979 (age 47)
- Place of birth: Buzău, Romania
- Height: 1.74 m (5 ft 9 in)
- Position: Midfielder

Team information
- Current team: Metalul Buzău (head coach)

Youth career
- –1997: Metalul Buzău

Senior career*
Years	Team	Apps	(Gls)
1997–1998	Dunărea Galați	31	(0)
1999	Gloria Buzău	16	(1)
1999–2000	Cimentul Fieni	14	(0)
2000–2004	Dunărea Galați		
2004–2005	Dacia Unirea Brăila	22	(0)
2005–2008	Zimbru Chișinău	44	(1)
2008–2010	Argeș Pitești	36	(0)
2010–2011	Gloria Buzău	12	(0)
2011–2012	CF Brăila	6	(0)
Total		181	(2)

Managerial career
- 2012: Dunărea Galați (assistant)
- 2012–2013: Dunărea Galați
- 2013–2014: Metalul Buzău
- 2014: FC Puiești
- 2015: Voința Buftea
- 2015–: Metalul Buzău
- * Club domestic league appearances and goals

Valentin Adrian Stan (born 12 September 1979) is a Romanian professional football manager and former player, currently in charge of Liga II club Metalul Buzău.

== Playing career ==
Stan was born on 12 September 1979 in Buzău. He began playing football in the youth system of Metalul Buzău and started his senior career in 1997 with Dunărea Galați in Divizia B, the second tier of Romanian football. He later played for Gloria Buzău, Cimentul Fieni, and spent a further spell at Dunărea Galați.

He then signed for Dacia Unirea Brăila before moving abroad to Moldovan club Zimbru Chișinău, where he spent three seasons in the Moldovan National Division. With Zimbru, he won the Moldovan Cup in the 2006–07 season. He also featured in European competition during the 2007–08 UEFA Cup, including matches against Artmedia Petržalka, with Zimbru being eliminated on the away goals rule.

Stan returned to Romania in 2008, joining Argeș Pitești, where he played in both Liga I and Liga II. He ended his playing career at CF Brăila in 2012.

== Managerial career ==
As his professional playing career drew to a close with CF Brăila in 2012, Stan moved into coaching, while continuing to play at county level for Metalul Buzău. He initially worked as an assistant coach to Eugen Baștină at Dunărea Galați in Liga II. He later took over as head coach after Baștină was dismissed in September 2012, following the opening rounds of the season. During this period, he was also involved in an on-field incident while playing for Metalul Buzău in a lower-league match, in which he was struck and required medical attention. Stan resigned from Dunărea Galați in March 2013, alongside other members of the coaching staff, following an administrative breach involving an ineligible player during a league match.

In 2013, he took charge of Metalul Buzău in Liga IV Buzău County. He later moved to FC Puiești in the summer of 2014 and joined Voința Buftea in Liga IV Ilfov County for the second half of the 2014–15 season.

In July 2015, he returned to Metalul Buzău after being appointed head coach of the team. He led the side to a runners-up finish in the 2015–16 season and subsequently to the Liga IV Buzău County title, securing promotion to Liga III after winning the promotion play-off at the end of the 2016–17 season.

In the following years, he remained in charge of Metalul Buzău and guided the team to consecutive Liga III titles in the 2022–23 and 2023–24 seasons, resulting in promotion to Liga II.

He continued to manage Metalul Buzău in Liga II, leading the team to consecutive notable runs in the Cupa României in the 2024–25 and 2025–26 seasons. On both occasions, the team eliminated top-flight Romanian teams and advanced beyond the group stage before being eliminated in the quarter-finals.

== Honours ==
=== Player ===
Dunărea Galați

- Divizia C: 2003–04

Zimbru Chișinău

- Moldovan Cup: 2006–07

=== Coach ===
Metalul Buzău

- Liga III: 2022–23, 2023–24
- Liga IV – Buzău County: 2016–17
