= Costel Toader =

Romanian former professional footballer (born 1986)

Personal information
- Date of birth: 29 July 1986 (age 40)
- Place of birth: Râmnicu Sărat, Romania
- Position: Goalkeeper

Senior career*
Years	Team	Apps	(Gls)
2006–2016	Râmnicu Sărat	2	(0)
2017–2020	Metalul Buzău		
2020–2023	Râmnicu Sărat	2	(0)
2023–2026	Metalul Buzău	3	(0)
- * Club domestic league appearances and goals as of 9 May 2026

Costel Toader (born 29 July 1986) is a former Romanian professional footballer who played as a goalkeeper.

== Club Career ==
He began his training in the Buzău area, the local club being the starting point for many players from the region.

He joined Metalul Buzău in February 2017 until 2020.

He was part of the team that achieved promotion to Liga III in 2017 and in 2024 to Liga II. He was an important player of the club during its rise from the county level to the national level until he left in 2020 and then came back in 2023.

He joined Râmnicu Sărat again in 2020 until 2023.

He joined Metalul Buzău again in 3 August 2023.

In the 2024–25 competitive season, at the age of 38 years, 9 months and 4 days, he became the oldest team captain in the second division.

In July 2026, Toader decided to retire as a professional footballer at the age of 39.

== Career statistics ==
Club	Season	League			National cup		Total	
Club	Season	Division	Apps	Goals	Apps	Goals	Apps	Goals
Râmnicu Sărat	2006–2017	Liga III	2	0	0	0	2	0
Metalul Buzău	2016–17	Liga IV Buzău	0	0	0	0	0	0
Metalul Buzău	2017–18	Liga III	0	0	0	0	0	0
Metalul Buzău	2018–19	Liga III	0	0	0	0	0	0
Metalul Buzău	2019–20	Liga III	0	0	1	0	1	0
Râmnicu Sărat	2020–21	Liga III	0	0	0	0	0	0
Râmnicu Sărat	2021–22	Liga III	0	0	0	0	0	0
Râmnicu Sărat	2022–23	Liga III	2	0	0	0	2	0
Metalul Buzău	2023–24	Liga III	0	0	1	0	1	0
Metalul Buzău	2024–25	Liga II	2	0	0	0	2	0
Metalul Buzău	2025–26	Liga II	1	0	1	0	2	0
Career total			7	0	3	0	10	0

== Honours ==
CSM Râmnicu Sărat

- Liga III: 2008–09
- Liga IV – Buzău County: 2014–15

Metalul Buzău

- Liga III: 2023–24
- Liga IV – Buzău County: 2016–17
