= Nikola Gavrić =

Croatian footballer (born 1995)

Personal information
- Date of birth: March 17, 1995 (age 31)
- Place of birth: Pula, Croatia
- Height: 1.86 m (6 ft 1 in)
- Position: Centre back

Youth career
- 2003–2013: Istra 1961
- 2013–2014: Vojvodina

Senior career*
Years	Team	Apps	(Gls)
2014	Francavilla	1	(0)
2015–2017	Novigrad	35	(1)
2017–2018	Sliema Wanderers	7	(1)
2018–2019	Sloboda Užice	34	(1)
2019–2021	Borec	22	(0)
2021	Sesvete	2	(0)
2022–2023	Opatija	18	(0)
2023–2024	Jadran Poreč		
2024	Viitorul Târgu Jiu	7	(0)
2025	Besa Dobërdoll	9	(0)
2025–2026	Metalul Buzău	6	(0)
- * Club domestic league appearances and goals as of 9 May 2026

Nikola Gavrić (Serbian Cyrillic: Никола Гаврић; born 17 March 1995), is a Croatian professional footballer who plays as a centre back.

== Club career ==
Born in Pula, Istria, Gavrić played in the youth team of local side NK Istra 1961 before signing his first professional contract when he was 18, with Serbian side FK Vojvodina. After a year playing for the youth and B teams of Vojvodina, he moved to Italy and played with F.C. Francavilla in the first half of the 2014–15 Serie D. During the winter-break he returned to Croatia and joined NK Novigrad. He was part of the team that won the 2015–16 Croatian Third League–West and playing subsequently in the 2016–17 Croatian Second Football League, scoring once in 35 league games for the club overall. Then he played with Sliema Wanderers F.C. in the 2017–18 Maltese Premier League and after a year in Malta, he moved to Serbia, this time signing with FK Sloboda Užice and playing in the 2018–19 Serbian First League.

== Honours ==
Novigrad

- Treća NL – West: 2015–16
