= Kingsley Ofori =

Ghanaian footballer (born 2002)

Personal information
- Full name: Kingsley Asante Ofori
- Date of birth: 1 March 2002 (age 24)
- Place of birth: Drobo, Ghana
- Height: 1.78 m (5 ft 10 in)
- Position: Winger

Youth career
- EurAfrica Football Academy
- Cremonese

Senior career*
Years	Team	Apps	(Gls)
2021–2023	EurAfrica Football Academy		
2021–2022	→ SJK II (loan)	29	(19)
2022	→ SJK (loan)	17	(0)
2023–2024	SJK	29	(3)
2024	SJK II	5	(1)
2025–2026	Politehnica Iași	22	(5)
- * Club domestic league appearances and goals as of 2 May 2026

Kingsley Asante Ofori (born 1 March 2002) is a Ghanaian professional footballer who plays as a winger.

== Career ==
Ofori was loaned out to Finnish SJK organisation in the early 2021 from Ghanaian EurAfrica Football Academy, and was first registered to the club's academy team SJK II in the second-tier Ykkönen. His loan was extended after the 2021 season, and during 2022, Ofori made his first appearances with SJK first team in Veikkausliiga. In January 2023, SJK exercised their purchase option for an undisclosed fee, and signed with Ofori on a two-year deal with a two-year option.

His deal with SJK was terminated on 30 August 2024.
