= Aleksej Golijanin =

Bosnian footballer

Personal information
- Date of birth: 2 April 2003 (age 23)
- Place of birth: Trebinje, Bosnia and Herzegovina
- Height: 1.87 m (6 ft 2 in)
- Position: Centre-forward

Youth career
- -2019: Red Star Belgrade
- 2019–2021: Čukarički
- 2021: Grafičar Beograd

Senior career*
Years	Team	Apps	(Gls)
2021–2023	Grafičar Beograd	22	(5)
2023–2025	RFS	7	(1)
2023–2024	→ Novi Pazar (loan)	8	(0)
2024	→ Daugavpils (loan)	20	(8)
2024–2025	→ Radnički 1923 (loan)	14	(1)
2025–2026	Sokol Saratov	21	(2)

International career^{‡}
2018	Bosnia and Herzegovina U15	2	(0)
2019	Bosnia and Herzegovina U16	3	(0)
2019	Bosnia and Herzegovina U17	6	(0)
2024–	Bosnia and Herzegovina U21	1	(0)
- * Club domestic league appearances and goals as of 16 May 2026 ‡ National team caps and goals as of 5 June 2024

Aleksej Golijanin (Serbian Cyrillic: Алексеј Голијанин; born 2 April 2003) is a Bosnian professional footballer who plays as a centre-forward.

== Early career ==
Golijanin was a member of the younger selections of Belgrade's Red Star Belgrade and Čukarički. At the beginning of 2021, he moved to Grafičar Beograd from Belgrade, and before the end of the same year, he signed a professional contract with the club.

=== RFS ===
During the winter half of the 2022–23 Serbian First League season, he make transfer from Grafičar Beograd to Latvian club RFS.

=== Novi Pazar ===
On 5 August 2023, Golijanin was loaned for six months from RFS to Novi Pazar.

=== Daugavpils ===
After the loan in Novi Pazar, Golijanin was back to RFS. He did not stay long before he was loaned to Daugavpils.

=== Radnički 1923 ===
After the football season at Daugavpils, Golijanin was back to RFS. On 30 August 2024, he was loaned to Radnički 1923, with an option from the Serbian club to buy it back him after he finished his loan at the end of the season.

On 14 September 2024, in a away match against Mladost Lučani in Lučani, he made his official debut in the Serbian SuperLiga where his new club lost by the result of 2:1.

On 18 November 2024, in a match against TSC he scored his first goal for Radnički 1923 on a away win in Bačka Topola by the result of 0:2.

== International career ==
He played for the Bosnian national teams at U15, U16, U17 and U21 levels.
