= Pedro Rocha =

Pedro Rocha may refer to:

- Pedro Rocha (Uruguayan footballer) (1942–2013), Uruguayan football manager and forward
- Pedro Rocha (footballer, born 1994), Brazilian football forward
- Pedro Rocha (footballer, born 1998), Brazilian football goalkeeper
- Pedro Rocha (Spanish businessman), President of the Royal Spanish Football Federation
