= Nicola Vasile =

Romanian footballer

Personal information
- Date of birth: 15 December 1984 (age 41)
- Place of birth: Bucharest, Romania
- Height: 1.80 m (5 ft 11 in)
- Position: Attacking midfielder

Senior career*
Years	Team	Apps	(Gls)
2003–2011	Sportul Studențesc București	125	(4)
- * Club domestic league appearances and goals

Nicola Vasile (born 15 December 1984) is a Romanian former footballer who played as a midfielder.

== Honours ==
Sportul Studențesc București

- Divizia B: 2003–04
