= Andrei Ureche =

Romanian footballer (born 1998)

Personal information
- Full name: Andrei Gabriel Ureche
- Date of birth: 27 July 1998 (age 28)
- Place of birth: Pașcani, Romania
- Height: 1.87 m (6 ft 2 in)
- Position: Goalkeeper

Team information
- Current team: Metalul Buzău
- Number: 23

Youth career
- SC Bacău

Senior career*
Years	Team	Apps	(Gls)
2015–2016	SC Bacău	12	(0)
2017	Unión Adarve	0	(0)
2017–2022	Academica Clinceni	62	(0)
2018–2019	→ Argeș Pitești (loan)	16	(0)
2022–2024	Botoșani	1	(0)
2023	→ FC Brașov (loan)	8	(0)
2024–2025	CSM Focșani	5	(0)
2026	Dunărea Călărași		
2026–	Metalul Buzău	1	(0)
- * Club domestic league appearances and goals as of 5 September 2026

Andrei Gabriel Ureche (born 27 July 1998) is a Romanian professional footballer who plays as a goalkeeper, who plays for Liga II club Metalul Buzău.
