= Sabin Moldovan =

Romanian footballer

Personal information
- Full name: Adrian Sabin Moldovan
- Date of birth: 16 March 1999 (age 27)
- Place of birth: Cozmești, Romania
- Height: 1.86 m (6 ft 1 in)
- Position: Forward

Team information
- Current team: Metalul Buzău
- Number: 11

Youth career
- –2016: Politehnica Iași

Senior career*
Years	Team	Apps	(Gls)
2016–2019	Politehnica Iași	8	(1)
2018	→ Academica Clinceni (loan)	8	(0)
2018–2019	→ CSM Alexandria (loan)	20	(6)
2019–2021	Unirea Slobozia	29	(9)
2021	Ceahlăul Piatra Neamț	10	(0)
2022–	Metalul Buzău	120	(31)
- * Club domestic league appearances and goals as of 31 October 2026

Adrian Sabin Moldovan (Romanian pronunciation: [adriˈan saˈbin moldoˈvan]; born 16 March 1999) is a Romanian professional footballer who plays as a forward for Liga II club Metalul Buzău.

== Honours ==
Unirea Slobozia

- Liga III: 2019–20

Metalul Buzău

- Liga III: 2022–23, 2023–24
