= Metalul Stadium =

Multi-use stadium in Buzău, Romania

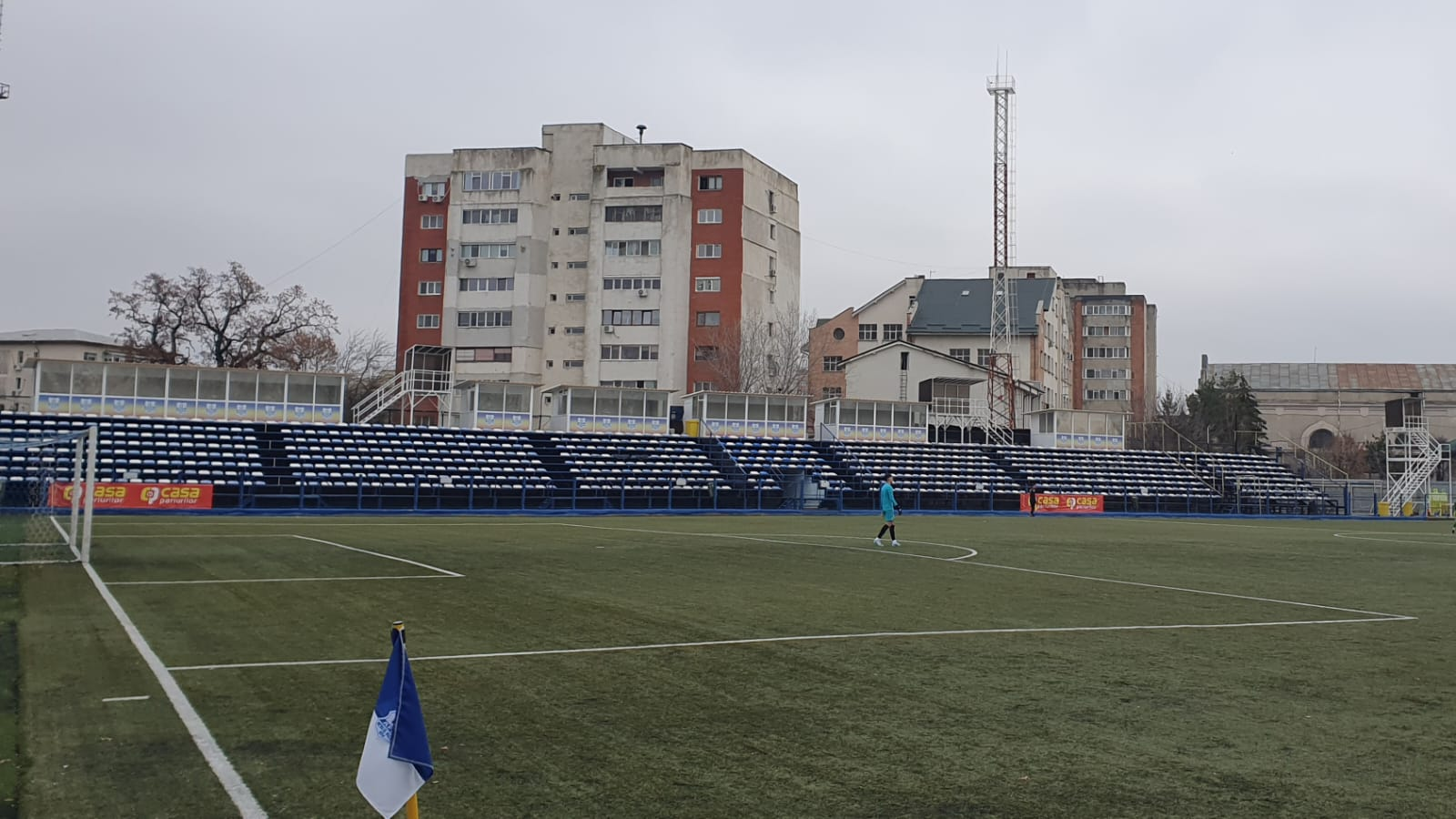
- Interactive map of Metalul Stadium
- Former names: Cornel Negoescu Stadium
- Address: Bld. Maresal Averescu 2
- Location: Buzău, Romania
- Coordinates: 45°08′41″N 26°48′10″E
- Owner: Metalul Buzău
- Operator: Metalul Buzău
- Capacity: 1,606
- Surface: Artificial turf

Construction
- Opened: 1950
- Renovated: 2013, 2017

Tenants
- Metalul Buzău (1982–present); ABC Stoicescu (2011–2012); Viitorul Buzău (2011–2013)

The Metalul Stadium is a multi-use stadium in Buzău, Romania. It is used mostly for football matches and is the home ground of Metalul Buzău. The stadium holds 1,606 people. In 2019 it was renamed back to "Metalul" after 11 years.
