= Alberto Olaru =

Romanian professional footballer

Personal information
- Full name: Alberto Nicolaie Olaru
- Date of birth: 28 March 1998 (age 28)
- Place of birth: Ploiești, Romania
- Height: 1.79 m (5 ft 10 in)
- Position: Right-back

Team information
- Current team: Metalul Buzău
- Number: 4

Youth career
- –2016: Petrolul Ploiești

Senior career*
Years	Team	Apps	(Gls)
2016–2023	Petrolul Ploiești	80	(0)
2023	Metaloglobus București	11	(0)
2023–	Metalul Buzău	61	(5)
- * Club domestic league appearances and goals as of 31 October 2026

Alberto Nicolae Olaru (Romanian pronunciation: [alˈberto nikoˈla.e oˈlaru]; born 28 March 1998) is a Romanian professional footballer who plays as a right-back for Liga II club Metalul Buzău.

== Club career ==
Olaru made his professional debut for his boyhood club Petrolul Ploiești on 24 October 2022, in a 2–0 Liga I win against FC Argeş.

== Honours ==
Petrolul Ploiești

- Liga II: 2021–22
- Liga III: 2017–18
- Liga IV – Prahova County: 2016–17

Metalul Buzău

- Liga III: 2023–24
