= AFC Metalul Buzău =

Romanian football club

Metalul Buzău
- Full name: Asociația Fotbal Club Metalul Buzău
- Nicknames: Buzoienii (The People from Buzău)
- Short name: Metalul
- Founded: 1954; 72 years ago
- Ground: Metalul
- Capacity: 1,606
- Owners: Buzău County Council; Mircea Benga
- Chairman: Gheorghe Guiu
- Head coach: Valentin Stan
- League: Liga II
- 2025–26: Liga II, 8th of 22
- Website: https://www.metalulbuzau.ro/
Home colours	Away colours	Third colours

Asociația Fotbal Club Metalul Buzău, commonly known as Metalul Buzău, is a Romanian professional football club based in the city of Buzău, Buzău County, that competes in the Liga II.

== History ==
Name	Period
Metalul Buzău	1954–1996
Metalcord Buzău	1996–2007
Metalul Buzău	2007–present

AFC Metalul Buzău was founded in 1954 as AS Metalul Buzău, under the patronage of the trade union of IUT Buzău. During its early years, the team competed in the local and regional championships. In the autumn of 1966, Metalul earned promotion to Divizia C, returning the city of Buzău to the third tier of Romanian football.

In 1971, as part of a reorganization of football in Buzău, Gloria Buzău was established and took over part of Metalul's squad as well as its place in Divizia C. Gloria went on to win its series in the 1971–72 Divizia C season and subsequently earned promotion to Divizia B following a promotion play-off held at Ploiești.

At the insistence of workers from the IUT factory, the Metalul football team was re-established in 1982. At the time, Steaua Săhăteni, a club from Săhăteni, Buzău County, was competing in Divizia C. Metalul merged with the Săhăteni side and assumed its place in the third tier.

In 1996, following an association with CORD Buzău, the club was renamed Metalcord Buzău. The final season in which the team competed in Divizia C under this name was the 2005–06 Divizia C campaign.

In the summer of 2007, the club reverted to its former name, AS Metalul Buzău, and subsequently competed in the Buzău County Championship, corresponding to Liga IV in the Romanian football league system.

In 2013, the club was taken over by the company Revicom Oil and adopted its current name, AFC Metalul Buzău.

At the end of the 2016–17 season, Metalul won the Buzău County Championship and faced CS Amara, the Ialomița County Championship winners, in the promotion play-off. Metalul won 9–2 on aggregate and returned to Liga III after a ten-year absence.

The 2019–20 Cupa României brought one of the club's most notable cup runs up to that point. Metalul advanced past Olimpic Zărnești 3–0 by federation decision in the second round, local rivals Gloria Buzău on penalties after a 3–3 draw in the third round, CSM Focșani 1–0 after extra time in the fourth round and FK Miercurea Ciuc 1–0 in the Round of 32. The run ended in the Round of 16 with a 0–3 defeat against Politehnica Iași.

During the following seasons, Metalul established itself as one of the stronger sides in Liga III. The club eventually dominated Series II in the 2023–24 season, collecting 49 points during the 18-match regular season before finishing the play-off with 74 points, 21 ahead of second-placed CSM Focșani.

In the first round of the promotion play-offs, Metalul faced FC Bacău. After losing the first leg 0–1 away, Metalul won the return match 2–1 and eventually prevailed 6–4 in the penalty shoot-out. In the decisive round, the Buzău side faced CSM Focșani. Despite losing the first leg 1–2 away, Metalul overturned the deficit with a 2–0 home victory on 5 June 2024, winning 3–2 on aggregate and securing promotion to Liga II for the first time under its current identity. The club subsequently received the federation certificate required to participate in the 2024–25 Liga II.

Metalul's first season after promotion, 2024–25, saw the club remain competitive in the second tier. Although it narrowly missed qualification for the promotion play-off and entered Group A of the play-out, Metalul comfortably retained its Liga II status.

The club enjoyed an exceptional run in the 2024–25 Cupa României. Metalul qualified for the group stage after defeating Universitatea Cluj 1–0 in the play-off. Drawn in Group B alongside FCSB, Universitatea Craiova, Dinamo București, Petrolul Ploiești and Agricola Borcea, the second-tier side produced several notable results. Metalul defeated Universitatea Craiova 1–0, drew 0–0 with Dinamo and beat Agricola Borcea 3–0. With seven points and no goals conceded, Metalul finished top of the group, ahead of Universitatea Craiova and FCSB, and qualified for the quarter-finals. The cup run ended in the quarter-finals.

Metalul remained in Liga II for the 2025–26 season. After the 21-match regular season, the club entered Group A of the play-out and secured its place in the second division for another campaign.

The 2025–26 Cupa României produced another historic campaign. Metalul defeated CSM Râmnicu Sărat 4–3 in the third round and then recorded a 4–0 victory over Ceahlăul Piatra Neamț in the play-off to qualify for the group stage for a second consecutive season.

Drawn in Group C alongside Universitatea Cluj, Oțelul Galați, Sepsi OSK, Csikszereda and Sporting Liești, Metalul finished among the top two and reached the quarter-finals for a second successive season, becoming the first Liga II representative to qualify for that stage in the 2025–26 edition. In the quarter-finals, Metalul faced Dinamo București at Arcul de Triumf Stadium on 5 March 2026 and was eliminated after a 0–1 defeat, Alexandru Pop scoring the only goal of the match.

Metalul retained its place in Liga II for the 2026–27 season, being one of fourteen clubs continuing in the second tier from the previous campaign. The season began on 1 August 2026 with 22 participating teams.

In the 2026–27 Cupa României, Metalul entered in the third round and defeated CSO Băicoi 4–2 on 12 August 2026, advancing to the play-off round.

== Stadium ==
The club plays its home matches on Metalul Stadium from Buzău.

== Rivalries ==
Although it is the oldest active football club in the Buzău County, Metalul has always lived in the shadow of Gloria Buzău, thus becoming their rivals.

== Honours ==
Liga III

- Winners (2): 2022–23, 2023–24

Divizia D / Liga IV – Buzău County

- Winners (5): 1981–82, 1989–90, 2002–03, 2004–05, 2016–17
- Runners-up (1): 2015–16

Ploiești Regional Championship

- Winners (1): 1965–66

== Players ==
=== First team squad ===
As of 24 August 2026

Note: Flags indicate national team as defined under FIFA eligibility rules; some limited exceptions apply. Players may hold more than one non-FIFA nationality.

No.	Pos.	Nation	Player
2	DF	ROU	Claudiu Juncănaru
3	DF	ROU	Raul Alecsandroaie (on loan from FCSB)
4	DF	ROU	Alberto Olaru (Vice-captain)
5	DF	ROU	Dănilă Parfeon
6	MF	JPN	Yasuhiro Hanada
7	FW	ROU	Cristian Dumitru
8	MF	ROU	Dănuț Oprea
9	MF	ROU	Geani Crețu
10	MF	ROU	Răzvan Milea
11	FW	ROU	Sabin Moldovan (3rd captain)
14	MF	FRA	Ilyas El Khabchi
15	DF	JPN	Koki Hayashi
19	MF	ROU	Darius Băncilă

No.	Pos.	Nation	Player
20	MF	ROU	Andrei Cubleșan (on loan from Viitorul Cluj)
23	GK	ROU	Andrei Ureche
25	GK	ROU	Iulian Dinu
26	DF	GRE	Nikos Baxevanos
27	MF	ROU	Florin Opaiț
28	FW	ROU	Valentin Robu
33	FW	ROU	Luca Nagy
77	MF	ROU	Florentin Puiu
80	MF	ROU	Ricardo Căldăraru (on loan from Farul Constanța)
97	MF	ROU	Alin Nica
98	MF	ROU	Saim Tudor (4th captain)
99	MF	ROU	Claudiu Borțoneanu (Captain)
—	FW	ROU	Tudor Zoicaș (on loan from Universitatea Cluj)

=== Out on loan ===
Note: Flags indicate national team as defined under FIFA eligibility rules; some limited exceptions apply. Players may hold more than one non-FIFA nationality.

No. / Pos. / Nation / Player; — / MF / ROU / Alexandru Oancea (at Inter Ilfov until 30 June 2027)	No. / Pos. / Nation / Player; — / FW / ROU / Bogdan Ion (at CSM Râmnicu Sărat until 30 June 2027)

== Club officials ==
=== Board of directors ===
Role	Name
Owners	(Romania) Buzău County Council (Romania) Mircea Benga
President	(Romania) Gheorghe Guiu
Accountant	(Romania) George Pașoi
Sporting Director	(Romania) Patrick Benga
Sporting Lawyer	(Romania) Cosmin Bărbieru
Administrative Lawyer	(Romania) Antoaneta Mereacre
Delegate	(Romania) Gheorghe Guiu
Press Officer	(Romania) Bogdan Ormuz
Stadium Administrator	(Romania) Dumitru Marin

=== Current technical staff ===
Role	Name
Head coach	(Portugal) Pedro Rocha
Assistant coaches	(Romania) Patrick Benga (Romania) George Țălnar (Romania) Mircea Ștefan
Goalkeeping coach	(Romania) Ștefan Leu
Video Analyst	(Romania) Dan Păun

== Notable former players ==
The footballers enlisted below have had international cap(s) for their respective countries at junior and/or senior level and/or significant caps for AFC Metalul Buzău.

Romania

- (Romania) Paul Batin
- (Romania) Patrick Benga
- (Romania) Sebastian Ghinga
- (Romania) Mihai Ion
- (Romania) Sorin Ispir
- (Romania) Vasile Lazăr
- (Romania) Alin Manea
- (Romania) Marian Manea
- (Romania) Vasilică Mihăeș
- (Romania) Andrei Pavel
- (Romania) Ștefan Păun
- (Romania) Ionuț Radu
- (Romania) Răzvan Radu
- (Romania) Ionuț Spătaru
- (Romania) Costel Toader
- (Romania) Marius Tudorică
- (Romania) Nicola Vasile

== Former managers ==
- (Romania) Dragoș Cojocaru (1966–1969)

== League history ==
Season	Tier	Division	Place	Notes	Cupa României
2026–27	2	Liga II	TBD		Play-off round
2025–26	2	Liga II	8th		Quarter Finals
2024–25	2	Liga II	10th		Quarter Finals
2023–24	3	Liga III (Seria II)	1st (C)	Promoted	
2022–23	3	Liga III (Seria II)	1st (C)		
2021–22	3	Liga III (Seria II)	4th		
2020–21	3	Liga III (Seria IV)	4th		
2019–20	3	Liga III (Seria II)	11th		Round of 16
2018–19	3	Liga III (Seria I)	7th		
2017–18	3	Liga III (Seria II)	5th		
2016–17	4	Liga IV (BZ)	1st (C)	Promoted	
