= Marius Tudorică =

Romanian footballer

Personal information
- Full name: Marius Cătălin Tudorică
- Date of birth: 12 November 1993 (age 32)
- Place of birth: Bucharest, Romania
- Height: 1.82 m (6 ft 0 in)
- Position: Midfielder

Team information
- Current team: Popești-Leordeni
- Number: 11

Youth career
- –2012: Voluntari

Senior career*
Years	Team	Apps	(Gls)
2012–2017	Voluntari	3	(0)
2014–2017	Voluntari II	37	(4)
2015	→ CS Ștefănești (loan)		
2018	Farul Constanța	21	(2)
2019	Daco-Getica București	25	(0)
2020–2021	Axiopolis Cernavodă	16	(6)
2021–2026	Metalul Buzău	98	(12)
2026–	Popești-Leordeni	12	(0)
- * Club domestic league appearances and goals as of 31 October 2026

Marius Cătălin Tudorică (Romanian pronunciation: [ˈmari.us kətəˈlin tudoˈrikə]; born 12 November 1993) is a Romanian professional footballer who plays as a midfielder for Liga II club Popești-Leordeni.

== Honours ==
Voluntari

- Liga III: 2013–14
- Cupa României: 2016–17
- Supercupa României: 2017

Metalul Buzău

- Liga III: 2022–23, 2023–24
