= Claudiu Juncănaru =

Romanian footballer

Personal information
- Full name: Claudiu Florin Juncănaru
- Date of birth: 18 February 1996 (age 30)
- Place of birth: Săveni, Romania
- Height: 1.77 m (5 ft 10 in)
- Positions: Right back; right midfielder

Team information
- Current team: Metalul Buzău
- Number: 2

Youth career
- –2012: Luceafărul Mihai Eminescu
- 2012–2014: Botoșani

Senior career*
Years	Team	Apps	(Gls)
2014–2018	Botoșani	4	(0)
2014–2015	→ Dorohoi (loan)	8	(0)
2015–2016	→ Bucovina Pojorâta (loan)	30	(4)
2017	→ Farul Constanța (loan)	12	(0)
2018	→ CSM Roman (loan)		
2018	CSM Roman		
2019	Turris Turnu Măgurele	6	(0)
2020–2022	CSM Focșani	53	(0)
2022–2023	CS Dinamo București	24	(2)
2023–2024	CSM Bacău		
2024–	Metalul Buzău	29	(0)
- * Club domestic league appearances and goals as of 8 August 2026

Claudiu Florin Juncănaru (Romanian pronunciation: [klaˈudju floˈrin ʒuŋkəˈnaru]; born 18 February 1996) is a Romanian professional footballer who plays as a right back or a right midfielder for Liga II club Metalul Buzău.

== Honours ==
Turris Turnu Măgurele

- Liga III: 2018–19
