= Claudiu Borțoneanu =

Romanian professional footballer

Personal information
- Full name: Claudiu Gabriel Borțoneanu
- Date of birth: 4 October 1999 (age 27)
- Place of birth: Bucharest, Romania
- Height: 1.84 m (6 ft 0 in)
- Position: Right midfielder

Team information
- Current team: Metalul Buzău
- Number: 99

Youth career
- –2016: Rapid București

Senior career*
| Years | Team | Apps | (Gls) |
| 2016–2019 | Sportul Snagov | 91 | (9) |
| 2019–2022 | Voluntari | 22 | (0) |
| 2021–2022 | → Metaloglobus București (loan) | 21 | (0) |
| 2022 | Corvinul Hunedoara | 14 | (3) |
| 2023 | Metalul Buzău | 11 | (1) |
| 2023 | CSM Alexandria | 1 | (0) |
| 2023– | Metalul Buzău | 78 | (3) |
- * Club domestic league appearances and goals as of 31 October 2026

Claudiu Gabriel Borțoneanu (born 4 October 1999) is a Romanian professional footballer who plays as a right midfielder for Liga II club Metalul Buzău, which he captains.
