= Popești-Leordeni =

- Town
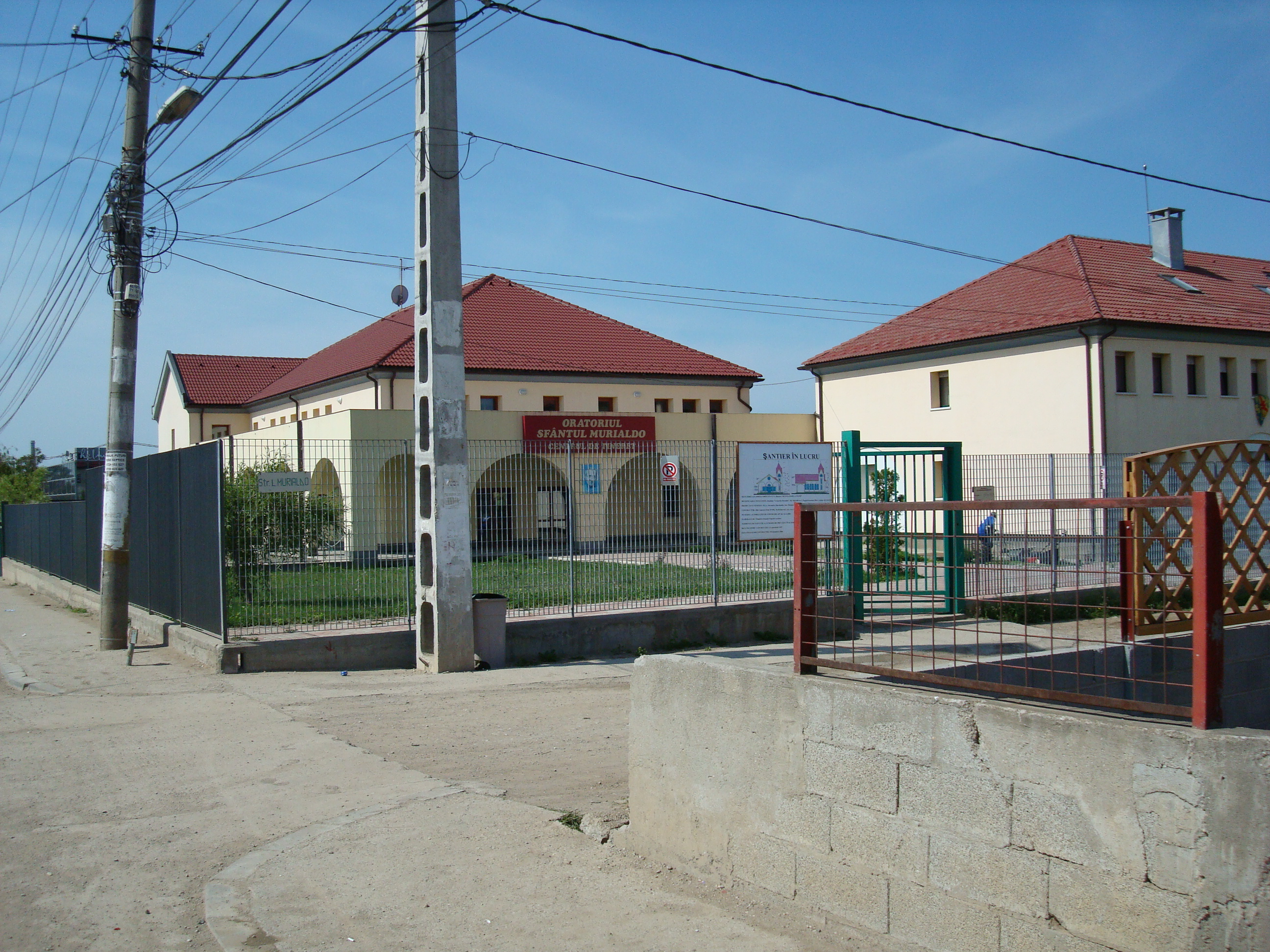

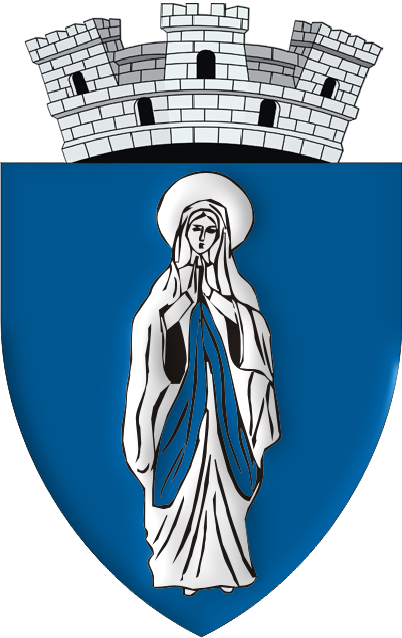
- Coat of arms

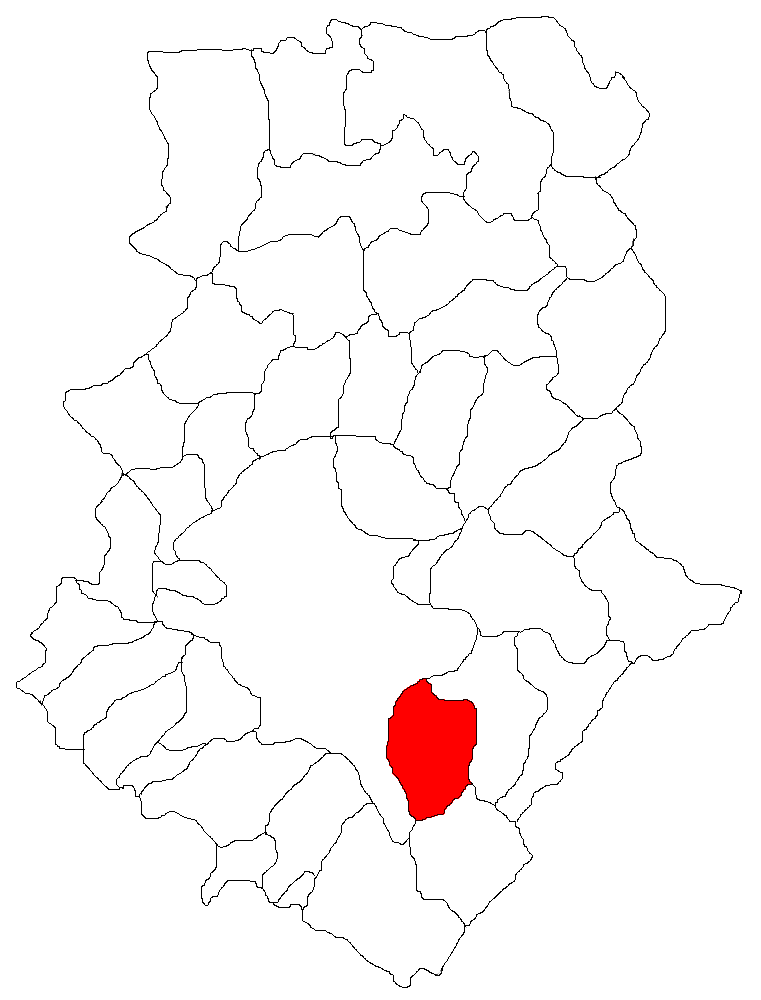
- Location in Ilfov County

- Location in Romania
- Coordinates: 44°22′48″N 26°10′12″E
- Country: Romania
- County: Ilfov

Government
  - Mayor (2024–2028): Petre Iacob (PSD)
- Area: 55.80 km^{2} (21.54 sq mi)
- Elevation: 70 m (230 ft)
- Population (2021-12-01): 53,434
  - Density: 957.6/km^{2} (2,480/sq mi)
- Time zone: UTC+02:00 (EET)
  - Summer (DST): UTC+03:00 (EEST)
- Postal code: 077160
- Area code: +(40) 021
- Vehicle reg.: IF
- Website: primăria-popești-leordeni.ro

Popești-Leordeni (Romanian pronunciation: [poˌpeʃtʲ le.orˈdenʲ]) is a town in Ilfov County, Muntenia, Romania, 9 km (5.6 mi) south of downtown Bucharest, although from the northern edge of the town to the southern edge of Bucharest the distance is less than 100 m (330 ft). Most of its inhabitants commute to Bucharest, with Popești-Leordeni being seen as a satellite town of the Romanian capital.

According to the 2011 census, Popești-Leordeni has a population of 21,895 inhabitants, making it the fourth most populous urban center in Ilfov County, after Voluntari, Pantelimon and Buftea. The settlement is known as the site of an old Bulgarian Catholic community.

== History ==
Popești-Leordeni is a town located in Ilfov County, Romania, historically formed by the unification of two distinct villages: Popești and Leordeni. The name Popești derives from the Romanian word popă, meaning "priest" (cognate with "pope"), while the name Leordeni comes from leurdă, the Romanian term for "rams" or Allium ursinum.

The villages of Popești and Leordeni were first attested in the 16th century. Leordeni was part of the domain belonging to the Băleanu family, a Wallachian boyar line, while Popești was in the ancestral lands of the chronicler Radu Popescu. The oldest documentary mention of the locality of Popești dates back to 1532, in connection with the commemoration of Vlad the Impaler's death by drowning in the Dâmbovița River.

Later, Popești was inherited by the Phanariot noble Alexandru Conduratu, who colonized it with Bulgarian populations from the vicinity of the city of Nicopolis and from Banat. This newly established locality was called Popești-Conduratu or Pavlicheni, a name that refers to the "Paulicians", a term used to identify the Roman Catholic community of Bulgarian origin, after their historical ancestors.

In 1632, Sofica, daughter of the stolnic Stoica of Sintești, received half of Popești as a dowry upon her marriage to the boyar Gheorghe Caridi, buying the other half later.

At the end of the 19th century, the communes of Popești-Conduratu and Leurdeni were organized on the current territory of the city, in the Dâmbovița area of Ilfov County. The commune of Popești-Conduratu consisted of two villages, Popești-Români and Popești-Pavlicheni, with 810 inhabitants, mostly Roman Catholic Bulgarians, living in 154 houses. The commune had a mixed school, an Orthodox church and a Catholic church.The commune of Leurdeni consisted of the villages of Leurdeni-Români and Leurdeni-Sârbi, with 496 inhabitants. The commune had a steam-powered threshing machine, a mixed school with 8 students (3 of whom were girls), and a church.

In 1873, the two communes were united under the name of Popești-Leurdeni and in 1925 the commune was part of the Pantelimon network of the same county and was composed of the villages of Popești-Pavlicheni (the seat), Popești-Români, Leurdeni and the hamlet of Cula, with a total population of 2,100 inhabitants.

In 1950, the commune of Popești-Leordeni was assigned to the N. Bălcescu district of the republican city of Bucharest, and in 1968, it became a suburban commune of the municipality of Bucharest, all its villages being merged into one. In 1981, it passed to the Ilfov Agricultural Sector, subordinate to the municipality of Bucharest, a sector that became Ilfov County in 1997.

In contemporary times, Popești-Leordeni has experienced significant growth as a suburb of Bucharest, marked by substantial development since the 2010s. However, this expansion has faced criticism regarding inadequate urban planning and the lack of building permits for numerous new constructions.

== Demographics ==
Historical population
Year	Pop.	±%
2002	15,115	—
2011	21,895	+44.9%
2021	53,434	+144.0%
Source: Census data

At the 2021 census, Popești-Leordeni had a population of 53,434. At the 2011 census, the town had 21,895 inhabitants. As of the 2002 census, the town had 15,115 inhabitants, and the population was distributed as follows.

=== Ethnicity ===
- Romanians: 14,915 (98.7%)
- Roma: 164 (1.1%)
- Hungarians: 12 (0.1%)
- Italians: 6 (0.04%)

=== Language ===
The inhabitants of Popești-Leordeni have the following languages as their first language:

- Romanian: 15,001 (99.3%)
- Romani: 80 (0.5%)
- Hungarian: 8 (0.05%)
- Italian: 5 (0.03%)

=== Religion ===
- Romanian Orthodox: 9665 (63.9%).
- Roman Catholic: 5308 (35.1%)
- Other religions or non-religious: 152 (1.0%)

In 1930, 99.2% of the 3,489 inhabitants declared as ethnic Romanians. 63.8% were Roman Catholic, 36.1% Romanian Orthodox.

== Administration ==
Popești-Leordeni is governed by a mayor and a local council consisting of 19 councilors. As of 2024, the mayor is Petre Iacob from the Social Democratic Party, who has held the office since 2012.

The city has an enrollment of 1,650 children in its educational institutions, which include four schools and seven kindergartens (three private). Public health services are provided by a dispensary with 6 doctors and 2 dentists, along with two pharmacies and the "Medica-Popești" polyclinic. Social welfare facilities include a nursing home supported by the "Sf. Maria" Institute and a home for orphaned children under the patronage of the F.A.R.A. foundation.

Religious institutions in Popești-Leordeni include Orthodox and Catholic churches. Notably, the Holy Virgin Mary is considered the patron and protector of the city, a patronage shared by the main Roman Catholic church. The city celebrates its special holiday annually on 8 September, coinciding with the Feast of the Nativity of the Holy Virgin Mary.

Popești-Leordeni comprises three villages: Popești-Conduratu (also known as Pavlicheni), Popești-Români, and Leordeni. The names of these villages reflect the toponymy of boyar families who historically resided in these areas centuries ago.

== Historic monuments ==
There are 22 sites on the list of historic monuments in Ilfov County, of different historical value.

Eight sites in the town of Popești-Leordeni are included in the List of Historical Monuments in Ilfov County as monuments of local interest. Six of them are classified as archaeological sites (including the ruins of the Costaforu mansion), and two as architectural monuments – the ensemble of the former Manu mansion, dating from the 17th–19th centuries, with the vaulted cellars and the church "Saints Archangels Michael and Gabriel"; and the Vintilă Vodă Church in Popești-Leordeni, dedicated to "Saint Alexandrina" and "Saint Hierarch Nicholas" in the Popești-Români neighborhood (built in 1676).

== Personalities born here ==
- Valentin Alexandru (b. 1991), footballer
- Radu Jercan (1945–2012), footballer
- Alfred-Laurentiu-Antonio Mihai (b. 1981), politician
- Răzvan Popescu (b. 1979), radio personality
- Hubert Thuma (b. 1973), politician
- Toma Zamfir (1954–2015), footballer
