= Yasuhiro Hanada =

Japanese footballer

Personal information
- Date of birth: 22 May 2000 (age 26)
- Place of birth: Aichi, Japan
- Height: 1.79 m (5 ft 10 in)
- Position: Midfielder

Team information
- Current team: Metalul Buzău
- Number: 6

Youth career
- Taketoyo FC
- –2015: Chita SC
- 2016–2018: Aichi High School

Senior career*
Years	Team	Apps	(Gls)
2019	Japan Soccer College		
2020–2022	Albirex Niigata (S)	25	(2)
2022–2023	Dainava	7	(1)
2023–2024	Garliava		
2024	Liepāja	0	(0)
2024	→ Grobiņas (loan)	13	(0)
2024	Jelgava	7	(0)
2025–	Metalul Buzău	18	(0)
- * Club domestic league appearances and goals as of 15 August 2026

Yasuhiro Hanada (花田 康弘, Hanada Yasuhiro; born 22 May 2000) is a Japanese professional footballer who plays as a midfielder for Liga II club Metalul Buzău.

== Club career ==
=== Albirex Niigata Singapore ===
Hanada started his career in Singapore. Since 2020 he has played in Albirex Niigata (S). He helped the club to win the 2020 Singapore Premier League title.

=== DFK Dainava ===
On 16 March 2022, Hanada moved to Lithuania to joined DFK Dainava. He made his debut in First League on 20 March 2022 against Be1 NFA. He scored his debut goal on 26 March 2022 against FK Garliava. On 6 May 2022 he scored a goal in LFF Cup game against FK Šturmas.

=== Garliava ===
On 15 February 2023, Hanada transferred to another Lithuanian club, FK Garliava.

== Honours ==
=== Club ===
Albirex Niigata Singapore

- Singapore Premier League: 2020

Dainava

- I Lyga: 2022
