= Liga IV Buzău =

Fourth tier Romanian football league

- Founded: 1968
- Country: Romania
- Level on pyramid: 4
- Promotion to: Liga III
- Relegation to: Liga V Buzău
- Domestic cup: Cupa României – County phase
- Current champions: Petrolul Berca (6th title) (2025–26)
- Most championships: Carpați Nehoiu (8 titles)
- Website: frf-ajf.ro/buzau
- Current: 2025–26 Liga IV Buzău

Liga IV Buzău is one of the regional football divisions of Liga IV, the fourth tier of the Romanian football league system, for clubs based in Buzău County, and is organized by AJF Buzău – Asociația Județeană de Fotbal (lit. 'County Football Association').

It is contested by a variable number of teams, depending on the number of teams relegated from Liga III, the number of teams promoted from Liga V Buzău, and the teams that withdraw or enter the competition. The winner may or may not be promoted to Liga III, depending on the result of a promotion play-off contested against the winner of a neighboring county series.

== History ==
In 1968, following the new administrative and territorial reorganization of the country, each county established its own football championship, integrating teams from the former regional championships as well as those that had previously competed in town and rayon level competitions. The freshly formed Buzău County Championship was placed under the authority of the newly created Consiliul Județean pentru Educație Fizică și Sport (lit. 'County Council for Physical Education and Sports') in Buzău County.

Since then, the structure and organization of Buzău’s main county competition, like those of other county championships, have undergone numerous changes. Between 1968 and 1992, it was known as Campionatul Județean (County Championship). In 1992, it was renamed Divizia C – Faza Județeană (Divizia C – County Phase), became Divizia D in 1997, and has been known as Liga IV since 2006.

== Promotion ==
The champions of each county association play against one another in a play-off to earn promotion to Liga III. Geographical criteria are taken into consideration when the play-offs are drawn. In total, there are 41 county champions plus the Bucharest municipal champion.

== List of champions ==
=== Buzău Regional Championship ===
Ed.	Season	Winners
1	1951	Spartac Buzău
2	1952	Spartac Râmnicu Sărat

=== Buzău County Championship ===
Ed.	Season	Winners
County Championship
1	1968–69	Foresta Nehoiu
2	1969–70	Olimpia Râmnicu Sărat
3	1970–71	Chimia Buzău
4	1971–72	Industria Sârmei Buzău
5	1972–73	Carpați Buzău
6	1973–74	Spartac Poșta Câlnau
7	1974–75	Carpați Nehoiu
8	1975–76	Recolta Săhăteni
9	1976–77	Petrolul Berca
10	1977–78	Carpați Nehoiu
11	1978–79	FNC Săhăteni
12	1979–80	Victoria Râmnicu Sărat
13	1980–81	Chimia Buzău
14	1981–82	Metalul Buzău
15	1982–83	Petrolul Berca
16	1983–84	ASA Buzău
17	1984–85	Voința Râmnicu Sărat
18	1985–86	Locomotiva Buzău
19	1986–87	ASA Buzău
20	1987–88	Hidromatica Buzău
21	1988–89	Carpați Nehoiu
22	1989–90	Metalul Buzău
23	1990–91	Carpați Nehoiu
24	1991–92	Cristalul Buzău
Divizia C – County phase
25	1992–93	Petrolul Berca
26	1993–94	Chimia Buzău
27	1994–95	Olimpia Râmnicu Sărat
28	1995–96	Foresta Nehoiu
29	1996–97	Olimpia Râmnicu Sărat
Divizia D
30	1997–98	Hidroconcas Buzău
31	1998–99	Hidroconcas Buzău
32	1999–00	Aromet Poșta Câlnau
33	2000–01	Aromet Poșta Câlnau
34	2001–02	Turistul Pietroasa Haleș
35	2002–03	Metalcord Buzău
36	2003–04	Foresta Nehoiu
37	2004–05	Hidro-Metalcord Buzău
38	2005–06	Unirea Mărăcineni

Ed.	Season	Winners
Liga IV
39	2006–07	Onix Râmnicu Sărat
40	2007–08	Petrolul Berca
41	2008–09	Partizanul Merei
42	2009–10	Recolta Cislău
43	2010–11	Luceafărul C.A. Rosetti
44	2011–12	Unirea Stâlpu
45	2012–13	Voința Lanurile
46	2013–14	Locomotiva Viitorul Buzău
47	2014–15	Olimpia Râmnicu Sărat
48	2015–16	Petrolul Berca
49	2016–17	Metalul Buzău
50	2017–18	Gloria Buzău
51	2018–19	Team Săgeata
52	2019–20	Râmnicu Sărat
53	2020–21	Team Săgeata
54	2021–22	Voința Limpeziș
55	2022–23	Montana Pătârlagele
56	2023–24	Voința Lanurile
57	2024–25	Carpați Nehoiu
58	2025–26	Petrolul Berca

== See also ==
=== Main Leagues ===
- Liga I
- Liga II
- Liga III
- Liga IV

=== County Leagues (Liga IV series) ===
North–East

- Liga IV Bacău
- Liga IV Botoșani
- Liga IV Iași
- Liga IV Neamț
- Liga IV Suceava
- Liga IV Vaslui

North–West

- Liga IV Bihor
- Liga IV Bistrița-Năsăud
- Liga IV Cluj
- Liga IV Maramureș
- Liga IV Satu Mare
- Liga IV Sălaj

Center

- Liga IV Alba
- Liga IV Brașov
- Liga IV Covasna
- Liga IV Harghita
- Liga IV Mureș
- Liga IV Sibiu

West

- Liga IV Arad
- Liga IV Caraș-Severin
- Liga IV Gorj
- Liga IV Hunedoara
- Liga IV Mehedinți
- Liga IV Timiș

South–West

- Liga IV Argeș
- Liga IV Dâmbovița
- Liga IV Dolj
- Liga IV Olt
- Liga IV Teleorman
- Liga IV Vâlcea

South

- Liga IV Bucharest
- Liga IV Călărași
- Liga IV Giurgiu
- Liga IV Ialomița
- Liga IV Ilfov
- Liga IV Prahova

South–East

- Liga IV Brăila
- Liga IV Buzău
- Liga IV Constanța
- Liga IV Galați
- Liga IV Tulcea
- Liga IV Vrancea
