= 2020–21 CSA Steaua București (football) season =

Steaua București
2020–21 season
- President: Mădălin-Sorin Hîncu / Ștefan Răzvan Bichir
- Head coach: Daniel Oprița
- Stadium: Terenul 5
- Liga III: 1st
- Cupa României: Second round
Home colours	Away colours

The 2020–21 CSA Steaua București season is the team's 59th season since its founding in 1947.

== Players ==
=== First team squad ===
As of 13 March 2021

Note: Flags indicate national team as defined under FIFA eligibility rules; some limited exceptions apply. Players may hold more than one non-FIFA nationality.

No.	Pos.	Nation	Player
1	GK	ROU	Ștefan Mușat
12	GK	ROU	Raul Bălbărău
22	GK	ROU	Horia Iancu (Captain)
4	DF	ROU	Dean Beța
5	DF	ROU	Sergiu Bactăr
13	DF	ROU	Adrian Ilie
16	DF	ROU	Antonio Vlad
55	DF	BRA	Wallace
89	DF	ROU	Ovidiu Morariu
6	MF	ROU	Mădălin Mihăescu
7	MF	ROU	Florin Răsdan (3rd captain)
8	MF	ROU	Valentin Bărbulescu (vice-captain)
9	MF	ROU	Emilian Pacionel

No.	Pos.	Nation	Player
10	MF	ROU	Rareș Enceanu
14	MF	ROU	Robert Neacșu
18	MF	ROU	George Călințaru
20	MF	ROU	Marian Neagu
30	MF	ROU	Liviu Băjenaru
47	MF	ROU	Dragoș Nicolae
99	MF	ROU	Vlad Nițu
11	FW	ROU	Dragoș Huiban
17	FW	FRA	Philippe Nsiah
31	FW	ROU	Cezar Mihalache
77	FW	ROU	Bogdan Chipirliu
90	FW	ROU	Alexandru Zaharia
-	FW	ROU	Andrei Antohi

== Transfers ==
=== In ===
No.	Age	Pos	Player	Transferred from	Type	Date
1	19	GK	(Romania) Ștefan Mușat	(Romania) Viitorul Constanța	Loan	17 August 2020
12	19	GK	(Romania) Raul Bălbărău	Free Agent	Transfer	17 August 2020
17	18	DF	(Romania) Gabriel Alexandru Udeanu	(Romania) Rapid București	Transfer	17 August 2020
16	19	DF	(Romania) Antonio Vlad	(Romania) Viitorul Constanța	Loan	17 August 2020
4	29	DF	(Romania) Dean Beța	(Romania) Mioveni	Transfer	17 August 2020
47	20	MF	(Romania) Dragoș Nicolae	(Romania) Olimpic București	Transfer	17 August 2020
19	31	MF	(Romania) George Călințaru	(Romania) Turris Turnu Măgurele	Transfer	17 August 2020
14	19	MF	(Romania) Emilian Pacionel	Free Agent	Transfer	3 September 2020
77	28	FW	(Romania) Bogdan Chipirliu	(Romania) SCM Gloria Buzău	Transfer	17 August 2020
11	30	FW	(Romania) Dragoș Huiban	(Romania) SCM Gloria Buzău	Transfer	21 January 2021
17	26	FW	(France) Philippe Nsiah	(Romania) CS Concordia Chiajna	Transfer	21 January 2021
31	21	FW	(Romania) Cezar Mihalache	(Romania) Viitorul Constanța	Transfer	28 February 2021
14	21	MF	(Romania) Robert Neacșu	Free Agent	Transfer	17 February 2021

=== Out ===
No.	Age	Pos	Player	Transferred to	Type	Date
17	24	MF	(Romania) Cosmin Mihai	Mostiștea Ulmu	Released	12 August 2020
47	31	FW	(Romania) Alin Robu	N/A	Released	12 August 2020
1	27	GK	(Romania) Teodor Meilă	Mostiștea Ulmu	Released	26 August 2020
4	21	DF	(Romania) Valentin Neaga	N/A	Released	2 September 2020
16	20	MF	(Romania) George Ban	N/A	Released	2 September 2020
17	20	DF	(Romania) Gabriel Alexandru Udeanu	N/A	Released	18 January 2021
8	33	MF	(Romania) Andrei Neagoe	N/A	Released	18 January 2021
26	21	MF	(Romania) Dorin Capotă	N/A	Released	18 January 2021
31	32	FW	(Romania) Róbert Elek	N/A	Released	8 February 2021
9	23	MF	(Romania) Valentin Niculae	N/A	Released	8 February 2021

== Pre-season and friendlies ==
Win Draw Loss

22 August 2020 Friendly	Steaua București (Romania)	1 – 3	(Romania) Metaloglobus București	Bucharest, Romania
11:00 EET (UTC+2)	Chipirliu 90+1'		Unknown 57', 69'; Ov. Herea 63' (pen.)	Stadium: Terenul V Attendance: 0 (Behind closed doors)

26 August 2020 Friendly	Steaua București (Romania)	5 – 2	(Romania) Astra II	Bucharest, Romania
18:00 EET (UTC+2)	Răsdan 3', 45'; Nițu 7'; Antohi 54', 78'		G.Șerban 52' (pen.), 63'	Stadium: Terenul V Attendance: 0 (Behind closed doors)

29 August 2020 Friendly	Steaua București (Romania)	2 – 0	(Romania) CS Afumați	Bucharest, Romania
11:00 EET (UTC+2)	Chipirliu 40' (pen.); Elek 63'			Stadium: Terenul V Attendance: 0 (Behind closed doors)

2 September 2020 Friendly	Steaua București (Romania)	5 – 1	(Romania) Mostiștea Ulmu	Bucharest, Romania
18:00 EET (UTC+2)	Chipirliu 34', 45+1' (pen.); Elek 51'; Antohi 57'; Răsdan 80'		Daniel Stoian 76'	Stadium: Terenul V Attendance: 0 (Behind closed doors)

28 January 2021 Friendly	Steaua București (Romania)	4 – 1	(Romania) FC Universitatea Cluj	Bucharest, Romania
12:00 EET (UTC+2)	Vlad Nițu 6'; Dragoș Nicolae 24'; Chipirliu 50', 55'		Alexandru Pop 32'	Stadium: Terenul V Attendance: 0 (Behind closed doors)

6 February 2021 Friendly	Steaua București (Romania)	4 – 3	(Romania) CS Sporting Roșiori	Bucharest, Romania
12:00 EET (UTC+2)	Chipirliu 7' (pen.); Cezar Mihalache 10', 45+1'; Pacionel 53'		Constantinescu 62'; Godin 67'; Bugeanu 81'	Stadium: Terenul V Attendance: 0 (Behind closed doors)

11 February 2021 Friendly	Steaua București (Romania)	2 – 2	(Romania) SCM Gloria Buzău	Bucharest, Romania
12:00 EET (UTC+2)	Chipirliu 14'; Zaharia 26'		Ciobanu 25'; Roșu 37'	Stadium: Terenul V Attendance: 0 (Behind closed doors)

17 February 2021 Friendly	Steaua București (Romania)	5 – 1	(Romania) CS Vedița Colonești	Bucharest, Romania
12:00 EET (UTC+2)	Enceanu 16' (pen.), 73'; Nsiah 35', 46'; Răsdan 69'		Robert Dalu 13'	Stadium: Terenul V Attendance: 0 (Behind closed doors)

20 February 2021 Friendly	Steaua București (Romania)	8 – 1	(Romania) AFC Metalul Buzău	Bucharest, Romania
12:00 EET (UTC+2)	Chipirliu 3', 8'; Nsiah 15'; Wallace 30'; Pacionel 64' (pen.), 79'; Răsdan 65'; Dragoș Nicolae 80'		Andrei Pavel 58' (pen.)	Stadium: Terenul V Attendance: 0 (Behind closed doors)

24 February 2021 Friendly	Steaua București (Romania)	8 – 0	(Romania) Academica Clinceni II	Bucharest, Romania
12:00 EET (UTC+2)	Dragoș Nicolae 45', 73'; Morariu 45+1'; Răsdan 56', 69', 76', 78', 84'			Stadium: Terenul V Attendance: 0 (Behind closed doors)

26 February 2021 Friendly	Steaua București (Romania)	6 – 3	(Romania) SC Popești-Leordeni	Bucharest, Romania
11:00 EET (UTC+2)	Nsiah 31'; Chipirliu 38'; Pacionel 45+1' (pen.); Răsdan 53'; Cezar Mihalache 83'; Enceanu 84'		Alin Pătrașcu 14'; Cristian Onțel 41'; Cosmin Ilie 43'	Stadium: Terenul V Attendance: 0 (Behind closed doors)

6 March 2021 Friendly	Steaua București (Romania)	2 – 0	(Romania) CSM Alexandria	Bucharest, Romania
11:00 EET (UTC+2)	Enceanu 34'; Morariu 69'			Stadium: Terenul V Attendance: 0 (Behind closed doors)

== Competitions ==
Win Draw Loss

=== Overview ===
Competition	First match	Last match	Starting round	Final position	Record							
Competition	First match	Last match	Starting round	Final position	Pld	W	D	L	GF	GA	GD	Win %
Liga III	12 September 2020	30 April 2021	Matchday 1	1	18	15	3	0	48	8	+40	83.33
Cupa României	9 September 2020	22 September 2020	First round	Second round	2	1	0	1	6	1	+5	50.00
Total					20	16	3	1	54	9	+45	80.00

Last updated: 22 May 2021.
Source: Competitions

=== Liga III - Seria IV ===
==== Standings ====
Pos	Team	Pld	W	D	L	GF	GA	GD	Pts	Promotion or relegation	STE	FCS	PRS	MBZ	TUN	VOL	DIN	RAP	CON	BAL
1	Steaua București (C, Q)	18	15	3	0	48	8	+40	48	Qualification to promotion play-off		1–1	4–1	5–0	0–0	1–0	4–0	2–0	2–0	5–1
2	FCSB II (Q)	18	12	3	3	42	20	+22	39	Qualification to promotion play-off	1–2		3–1	4–2	2–1	1–1	2–1	4–1	6–0	2–0
3	Progresul Spartac București	18	12	1	5	39	18	+21	37		0–2	4–0		3–0	1–2	3–1	5–1	3–1	2–2	7–0
4	Metalul Buzău	18	7	6	5	27	24	+3	27		2–2	1–1	1–0		0–1	2–0	4–1	2–1	3–0	3–0
5	Tunari	18	7	5	6	16	12	+4	26		0–1	0–2	0–1	0–0		0–0	0–1	1–0	5–1	3–0

Source: FRF (in Romanian), Soccerway
Legend: Blue = home team win; Yellow = draw; Red = away team win.
Rules for classification: 1) Points; 2) Head-to-head points; 3) Head-to-head goal difference; 4) Head-to-head goals scored; 5) Head-to-head away goals scored; 6) Goal difference; 7) Goals scored.
(C) Champions; (Q) Qualified for the phase indicated

==== Matches ====
12 September 2020 1	Steaua București (Romania)	5 – 1	(Romania) CS Balotești	Bucharest, Romania
17:00 EET (UTC+2)	Enceanu 3', 7'; Zaharia 32'; Adrian Ilie 38'; Răsdan 43'		Constantin Greblea 31'	Stadium: Terenul V Attendance: 0 (Behind closed doors)

19 September 2020 2	FCSB II (Romania)	1 – 2	(Romania) Steaua București	Bucharest, Romania
17:00 EET (UTC+2)	Laurențiu Ardelean 41+1' (pen.)		Chipirliu 66'; Antohi 90'	Stadium: Baza Arcom; Attendance: 0 (Behind closed doors)

26 September 2020 3	Steaua București (Romania)	4 – 1	(Romania) Progresul Spartac	Bucharest, Romania
17:00 EET (UTC+2)	Chipirliu 11', 70'; Pacionel 43'; Enceanu 90'		Mihai Ion 87'	Stadium: Terenul V Attendance: 0 (Behind closed doors)

3 October 2020 4	Dinamo II (Romania)	1 – 3	(Romania) Steaua București	Bucharest, Romania
15:00 EET (UTC+2)	Crețu 86'		Wallace 11', 32'; Dragoș Nicolae 43'	Stadium: Dinamo; Attendance: 0 (Behind closed doors)

28 October 2020 (rescheduled) 5	Steaua București (Romania)	1 – 0	(Romania) Voluntari II	Bucharest, Romania
15:00 EET (UTC+2)	Morariu 64'			Stadium: Terenul V Attendance: 0 (Behind closed doors)

17 October 2020 6	Steaua București (Romania)	2 – 0	(Romania) Concordia Chiajna II	Bucharest, Romania
15:00 EET (UTC+2)	Pacionel 47' (pen.); Dragoș Nicolae 90+4'			Stadium: Terenul V Attendance: 0 (Behind closed doors)

24 October 2020 7	Rapid II (Romania)	0 – 1	(Romania) Steaua București	Bucharest, Romania
15:00 EET (UTC+2)			Răsdan 68'	Stadium: Regie; Attendance: 0 (Behind closed doors)

31 October 2020 8	Steaua București (Romania)	0 – 0	(Romania) CS Tunari	Bucharest, Romania
15:00 EET (UTC+2)				Stadium: Terenul V Attendance: 0 (Behind closed doors)

7 November 2020 9	Metalul Buzău (Romania)	2 – 2	(Romania) Steaua București	Buzau, Romania
14:00 EET (UTC+2)	Andrei Pavel 64' (pen.), 79'		Pacionel 45+1' (pen.); Răsdan 90+5'	Stadium: Cornel Negoescu; Attendance: 0 (Behind closed doors)

13 November 2020 10	CS Balotești (Romania)	1 – 5	(Romania) Steaua București	Balotești, Romania
14:00 EET (UTC+2)	Alexandru Iordan 54' (pen.)		Chipirliu 11'; Enceanu 26', 38', 84'; Călințaru 86'	Stadium: Central; Attendance: 0 (Behind closed doors)

13 March 2021 11	Steaua București (Romania)	1 – 1	(Romania) FCSB II	Bucharest, Romania
15:00 EET (UTC+2)	Huiban 90+2'		Alexandru Buziuc 73'	Stadium: Terenul V Attendance: 0 (Behind closed doors)

20 March 2021 12	Progresul Spartac (Romania)	0 – 2	(Romania) Steaua București	Bucharest, Romania
15:00 EET (UTC+2)			Mihăescu 25'; Huiban 57'	Stadium: Progresul Spartac; Attendance: 0 (Behind closed doors)

27 March 2021 13	Steaua București (Romania)	4 – 0	(Romania) Dinamo II	Bucharest, Romania
15:00 EET (UTC+2)	Chipirliu 32', 58', 62'; Dragoș Nicolae 79'			Stadium: Terenul V Attendance: 0 (Behind closed doors)

3 April 2021 14	Voluntari II (Romania)	0 – 3	(Romania) Steaua București	Bucharest, Romania
17:00 EET (UTC+2)			Chipirliu 28', 48', 75'	Stadium: Anghel Iordănescu; Attendance: 0 (Behind closed doors)

9 April 2021 15	Concordia Chiajna II (Romania)	0 – 5	(Romania) Steaua București	Chiajna, Romania
17:00 EET (UTC+2)			Zaharia 10'; Chipirliu 24', 60'; Răsdan 89'; Pacionel 90+2'	Stadium: Concordia; Attendance: 0 (Behind closed doors)

17 April 2021 16	Steaua București (Romania)	2 – 0	(Romania) Rapid II	Bucharest, Romania
17:00 EET (UTC+2)	Pacionel 81' (pen.); Walace 89'			Stadium: Terenul V Attendance: 0 (Behind closed doors)

24 April 2021 17	CS Tunari (Romania)	0 – 1	(Romania) Steaua București	Tunari, Romania
17:00 EET (UTC+2)			Zaharia 63'	Stadium: Tunari; Attendance: 0 (Behind closed doors)

30 April 2021 18	Steaua București (Romania)	5 – 0	(Romania) Metalul Buzău	Bucharest, Romania
15:00 EET (UTC+2)	Chipirliu 20', 32'; Huiban 27'; Zaharia 43' (pen.); Enceanu 82'			Stadium: Terenul V Attendance: 0 (Behind closed doors)

=== Liga III promotion play-off ===
8 May 2021 First round, first leg	Mostiștea Ulmu (Romania)	0 – 2	(Romania) Steaua București	Bucharest, Romania
11:30 EET (UTC+2)			Acasandrei 10' (o.g.); Pacionel 47' (pen.)	Stadium: Voința; Attendance: 0 (Behind closed doors); Referee: Eduard Ioniță (Galați)

15 May 2021 First round, second leg	Steaua București (Romania)	2 – 0	(Romania) Mostiștea Ulmu	Bucharest, Romania
11:30 EET (UTC+2)	Pacionel 66' (pen.); Mihalache 90+4'			Stadium: Terenul V Attendance: 0 (Behind closed doors); Referee: Florin Andrei (Târgu Mureș)

22 May 2021 Second round, first leg	Steaua București (Romania)	2 – 0	(Romania) Afumați	Bucharest, Romania
17:30 EET (UTC+2)	Al. Zaharia 6'; Chipirliu 28'			Stadium: Terenul V Referee: Marcel Bîrsan (Bucharest)

29 May 2021 Second round, second leg	Afumați (Romania)	1 – 2	(Romania) Steaua București	Afumați, Romania
17:30 EET (UTC+2)	Adrian Popa 45'		Călințaru 3'; Pacionel 90' (pen.)	Stadium: Comunal

=== Cupa României ===
9 September 2020 First round	Steaua București (Romania)	6 – 0	(Romania) CS Balotești	Bucharest, Romania
16:30 EET (UTC+2)	Răsdan 3'; Băjenaru 21'; Elek 32', 65'; Mihăescu 69'; Dragoș Nicolae 84'			Stadium: Terenul V Attendance: 0 (Behind closed doors)

22 September 2020 Second round	Steaua București (Romania)	0 – 1	(Romania) Popești-Leordeni	Bucharest, Romania
16:30 EET (UTC+2)			Mărgărit 77'	Stadium: Terenul V Attendance: 0 (Behind closed doors)

== Statistics ==
=== Squad appearances and goals ===
Last updated on 7 June 2021.

No.	Pos	Nat	Player	Total		Liga III		Play-off		Cupa României	
No.	Pos	Nat	Player	Apps	Goals	Apps	Goals	Apps	Goals	Apps	Goals
Goalkeepers
1	GK	(Romania) ROU	Ștefan Mușat	13	0	11+1	0	0	0	1	0
12	GK	(Romania) ROU	Raul Bălbărău	11	0	6	0	4	0	1	0
22	GK	(Romania) ROU	Horia Iancu	1	0	1	0	0	0	0	0
Defenders
4	DF	(Romania) ROU	Dean Beța	20	0	15	0	3	0	2	0
5	DF	(Romania) ROU	Sergiu Bactăr	10	0	5+2	0	1+1	0	1	0
13	DF	(Romania) ROU	Adrian Ilie	21	1	15	1	4	0	2	0
16	DF	(Romania) ROU	Antonio Vlad	11	0	5+4	0	0	0	2	0
17	DF	(Romania) ROU	Gabriel Alexandru Udeanu	1	0	0+1	0	0	0	0	0
55	DF	(Brazil) BRA	Wallace	18	3	13	3	4	0	0+1	0
89	DF	(Romania) ROU	Ovidiu Morariu	10	1	2+7	1	0	0	1	0
Midfielders
6	MF	(Romania) ROU	Mădălin Mihăescu	21	2	10+5	1	1+3	0	2	1
7	MF	(Romania) ROU	Florin Răsdan	22	5	12+4	4	1+3	0	2	1
8	MF	(Romania) ROU	Valentin Bărbulescu	21	0	12+3	0	4	0	0+2	0
9	MF	(Romania) ROU	Emilian Pacionel	20	8	14+2	5	4	3	0	0
10	MF	(Romania) ROU	Rareș Enceanu	21	7	10+5	7	2+2	0	1+1	0
14	MF	(Romania) ROU	Robert Neacșu	5	0	3+2	0	0	0	0	0
18	MF	(Romania) ROU	George Călințaru	19	2	12+3	1	4	1	0	0
20	MF	(Romania) ROU	Marian Neagu	2	0	2	0	0	0	0	0
26	MF	(Romania) ROU	Dorin Capotă	0	0	0	0	0	0	0	0
30	MF	(Romania) ROU	Liviu Băjenaru	22	1	7+10	0	1+2	0	1+1	1
47	MF	(Romania) ROU	Dragoș Nicolae	6	4	1+4	3	0	0	0+1	1
99	MF	(Romania) ROU	Vlad Nițu	9	0	1+6	0	0	0	2	0
-	MF	(Romania) ROU	Andrei Neagoe	6	0	1+4	0	0	0	1	0
-	MF	(Romania) ROU	Valentin Niculae	0	0	0	0	0	0	0	0
Forwards
11	FW	(Romania) ROU	Dragoș Huiban	12	3	5+3	3	4	0	0	0
17	FW	(France) FRA	Philippe Nsiah	6	0	3+1	0	2	0	0	0
31	FW	(Romania) ROU	Cezar Mihalache	8	1	0+5	0	0+3	1	0	0
77	FW	(Romania) ROU	Bogdan Chipirliu	18	15	14+1	14	1	1	1+1	0
90	FW	(Romania) ROU	Alexandru Zaharia	20	5	11+3	4	4	1	0+2	0
-	FW	(Romania) ROU	Andrei Antohi	9	1	3+5	1	0	0	1	0
-	FW	(Romania) ROU	Róbert Elek	8	2	4+2	0	0	0	1+1	2
