= 2021–22 CSA Steaua București (football) season =

Steaua București
2021–22 season
- President: Ștefan Răzvan Bichir
- Head coach: Daniel Oprița
- Stadium: Steaua
- Liga II: Pre-season
- Cupa României: Pre-season
Home colours

The 2021–22 CSA Steaua București season is the team's 60th season since its founding in 1947.

== Players ==
=== First team squad ===
As of 16 February 2022

Note: Flags indicate national team as defined under FIFA eligibility rules; some limited exceptions apply. Players may hold more than one non-FIFA nationality.

No.	Pos.	Nation	Player
1	GK	ROU	Raul Bălbărău
12	GK	ROU	Codruţ Sandu
22	GK	ROU	Horia Iancu (Captain)
4	DF	ROU	Dean Beța
5	DF	ROU	Sergiu Bactăr
13	DF	ROU	Adrian Ilie
14	DF	ROU	Robert Neacșu
17	DF	ROU	Darius Oroian
18	DF	ROU	George Călințaru
55	DF	BRA	Walace
89	DF	ROU	Ovidiu Morariu
6	MF	ROU	Mădălin Mihăescu
8	MF	ROU	Valentin Bărbulescu (vice-captain)
9	MF	ROU	Emilian Pacionel
10	MF	ROU	Rareș Enceanu

No.	Pos.	Nation	Player
16	MF	ROU	Andrei Zătreanu
19	MF	ROU	Stephan Drăghici
20	MF	ROU	Florin Răsdan (3rd captain)
27	MF	ROU	Ștefan Pacionel
30	MF	ROU	Cristian Bustea
32	MF	ROU	Claudiu Donose
88	MF	ROU	Adrian Popa
90	MF	ROU	Alexandru Zaharia
—	MF	ROU	Liviu Băjenaru
11	FW	ROU	Dragoș Huiban
21	FW	ROU	Vasile Buhăescu
77	FW	ROU	Bogdan Chipirliu
99	FW	ROU	Claudiu Dragu
—	FW	ROU	Iustin Raducan

== Transfers ==
=== In ===
No.	Age	Pos	Player	Transferred from	Type	Date
21	33	FW	(Romania) Vasile Buhăescu	(Romania) Petrolul Ploiești	Transfer	24 June 2021
19	23	MF	(Romania) Stephan Drăghici	(Romania) Universitatea Craiova	Transfer	18 July 2021
27	22	MF	(Romania) Ștefan Pacionel	(Romania) Axiopolis Cernavodă	Transfer	20 July 2021
99	20	FW	(Romania) Cezar Gherghiceanu	(Romania) Farul Constanța	Transfer	
17	17	DF	(Romania) Darius Oroian	(Romania) Farul Constanța U19	Transfer	
12	-	GK	(Romania) Codruţ Sandu	Steaua's Youth Center	Promoted	
16	18	MF	(Romania) Andrei Zătreanu	(Romania) FCSB U19	Transfer	
32	17	MF	(Romania) Claudiu Donose	(Romania) Rapid București	Transfer	
-	17	GK	(Romania) Mario Enache	(Romania) FC U Craiova 1948	Loan	
88	33	MF	(Romania) Adrian Popa	Free Agent (last time at Academica Clinceni)	Transfer	22 September 2021
30	27	MF	(Romania) Cristian Bustea	Free Agent (last time at UTA Arad)	Transfer	13 February 2022
	30	FW	(Romania) Claudiu Dragu	(Romania) Astra Giurgiu	Transfer	15 February 2022
	16	FW	(Romania) Iustin Răducan	(Romania) Sport Team	Transfer	15 February 2022

=== Out ===
No.	Age	Pos	Player	Transferred to	Type	Date
1	19	GK	(Romania) Ștefan Mușat	(Romania) FC Viitorul II Constanța	Loan ended	
16	19	DF	(Romania) Antonio Vlad	(Romania) FC Viitorul II Constanța	Loan ended	
17	26	FW	(France) Philippe Nsiah	N/A	Released	
20	29	MF	(Romania) Marian Neagu	N/A	Released	
31	21	FW	(Romania) Cezar Mihalache	N/A	Released	
-	32	FW	(Romania) Andrei Antohi	N/A	Released	
99	21	MF	(Romania) Vlad Nițu	N/A	Loan	
47	19	MF	(Romania) Dragoș Nicolae	N/A	Loan	
99	20	FW	(Romania) Cezar Gherghiceanu	N/A	Released	10 December 2021
-	17	GK	(Romania) Mario Enache	(Romania) FC U Craiova 1948	End of Loan	10 December 2021

== Pre-season and friendlies ==
Win Draw Loss

26 June 2021 Friendly	Steaua București (Romania)	1 – 2	(Romania) Academica Clinceni	Bucharest, Romania
10:30 EET (UTC+2)	Enceanu 66'		Gavra 8', 21' (pen.)	Stadium: Terenul V Attendance: 0 (Behind closed doors)

7 July 2021 Friendly	Steaua București (Romania)	6 – 0	(Serbia) OFK Beograd	Bucharest, Romania
19:00 EET (UTC+2)	Chipirliu 51', 52'; Huiban 62' (pen.); Cezar Gherghiceanu 76'; Robert Neacșu 87' (pen.), 90+2'			Stadium: Steaua; Attendance: 15.000

14 July 2021 Friendly	Steaua București (Romania)	3 – 1	(Romania) Astra	Bucharest, Romania
18:10 EET (UTC+2)	Răsdan 12', 15'; Buhăescu 44'		Dragoș Gheorghe 34'	Stadium: Terenul V Attendance: 0 (Behind closed doors)

17 July 2021 Friendly	Steaua București (Romania)	4 – 0	(Romania) CS Afumați	Bucharest, Romania
11:10 EET (UTC+2)	Chipirliu 11', 59'; Răsdan 78'; Enceanu 90+3'			Stadium: Terenul V Attendance: unknown

21 July 2021 Friendly	Steaua București (Romania)	2 – 2	(Romania) FC Metaloglobus București	Bucharest, Romania
18:10 EET (UTC+2)	Băjenaru 30', 32'		Herea 60'; Alexandru Potocea 90'	Stadium: Steaua; Attendance: 0 (Behind closed doors)

24 July 2021 Friendly	Steaua București (Romania)	3 – 0	(Romania) Unirea Constanța	Bucharest, Romania
11:00 EET (UTC+2)	Huiban 16'; Buhăescu 40'; Zaharia 64'			Stadium: Steaua; Attendance: 0 (Behind closed doors)

4 September 2021 Friendly	Steaua București (Romania)	1 – 2	(Romania) FC Voluntari	Bucharest, Romania
11:00 EET (UTC+2)	Răsdan 31'		Golan 50'; Angelov 51'	Stadium: Steaua; Attendance: 0 (Behind closed doors)

9 October 2021 Friendly	Steaua București (Romania)	2 – 1	(Romania) FC Voluntari	Bucharest, Romania
11:00 EET (UTC+2)	Drăghici 22'; Călințaru 65'		Costin 55'	Stadium: Terenul 6 Attendance: 0 (Behind closed doors)

13 November 2021 Friendly	FC U Craiova (Romania)	4 – 1	(Romania) Steaua București	Craiova, Romania
14:00 EET (UTC+2)	Ondaan 40', 55'; Asamoah 53'; Alexandru Raicea 90'		Popa 59'	Stadium: FCU Football Park; Attendance: 0 (Behind closed doors)

24 November 2021 Friendly	Steaua București (Romania)	6 – 0	(Romania) ACS Unirea Bascov	Bucharest, Romania
13:00 EET (UTC+2)	Andrei Zătreanu 1', 56'; Băjenaru 8'; Cezar Gherghiceanu 37'; Mazire Soula 59'; Alexandru Stoian 83'			Stadium: Terenul 6 Attendance: 0 (Behind closed doors)

9 December 2021 Friendly	Steaua București (Romania)	3 – 0	(Romania) CSO Retezatul Haţeg	Bucharest, Romania
11:30 EET (UTC+2)	Emilian Pacionel 33' (pen.); Manole Mihai 60' (pen.); Iustin Răducan 90'			Stadium: Terenul 5 Attendance: 0 (Behind closed doors)

15 January 2022 Friendly	Steaua București (Romania)	2 – 2	(Romania) Progresul Spartac	Bucharest, Romania
11:00 EET (UTC+2)	Emilian Pacionel 18'; Drăghici 69'		Giovani Petcu 81' (pen.); Eduard Radu 83'	Stadium: Terenul 5 Attendance: 0 (Behind closed doors)

22 January 2022 Friendly	Steaua București (Romania)	3 – 1	(Romania) CS Tunari	Bucharest, Romania
12:00 EET (UTC+2)	Beța 12'; Chipirliu 35'; Buhăescu 47'		Mihai Vasile 69'	Stadium: Terenul 5 Attendance: 0 (Behind closed doors)

28 January 2022 Friendly	Steaua București (Romania)	3 – 1	(Romania) CS Afumați	Bucharest, Romania
12:00 EET (UTC+2)	Oroian 56'; Chipirliu 84', 89' (pen.)		Robert Buduroi 75'	Stadium: Terenul 5 Attendance: 0 (Behind closed doors)

2 February 2022 Friendly	Steaua București (Romania)	7 – 1	(Romania) Jiul Petroșani	Bucharest, Romania
14:00 EET (UTC+2)	Huiban 2', 27'; Emilian Pacionel 16' (pen.); Răsdan 20'; Sergiu Bactăr 45'; Claudiu Donose 75'; Iustin Răducan 88' (pen.)		Octavian Ionică 66'	Stadium: Terenul 5 Attendance: 0 (Behind closed doors)

5 February 2022 Friendly	Farul II (Romania)	1 – 6	(Romania) Steaua București	Ovidiu, Romania
13:00 EET (UTC+2)	Ianis Malama 62'		Robert Neacșu 19'; Buhăescu 28', 53'; Bustea 35'; Chipirliu 50' (pen.); Popa 86'	Stadium: Complexul Sportiv „Academia de fotbal Gheorghe Hagi” Attendance: 0 (Behind closed doors)

9 February 2022 Friendly	Steaua București (Romania)	6 – 1	(Romania) FC Bolintin Malu Spart	Bucharest, Romania
	Popa 38', 45' unknown unknown unknown unknown		Tudorache 15'	Stadium: Terenul 5 Attendance: 0 (Behind closed doors)

12 February 2022 Friendly	Astra Giurgiu (Romania)	1 – 7	(Romania) Steaua București	Giurgiu, Romania
13:00 EET (UTC+2)	unknown		Enceanu 16'; Chipirliu 37', 44', 49'; Buhăescu 39', 45'; Huiban 85' (pen.)	Stadium: Marin Anastasovici; Attendance: 200

19 February 2022 Friendly	Steaua București (Romania)	0 – 1	(Romania) Concordia Chiajna	Bucharest, Romania
12:00 EET (UTC+2)			Casap 15'	Stadium: Terenul 5 Attendance: 0 (Behind closed doors)

26 March 2022 Friendly	FC U Craiova (Romania)	1 – 4	(Romania) Steaua București	Craiova, Romania
14:00 EET (UTC+2)	Compagno 20'		Emilian Pacionel 25'; Drăghici 38'; Popa 69'; Buhăescu 76'	Stadium: Complex Sportiv Craiova; Attendance: 0 (Behind closed doors)

== Competitions ==
Win Draw Loss

=== Overview ===
Competition	First match	Last match	Starting round	Final position	Record							
Competition	First match	Last match	Starting round	Final position	Pld	W	D	L	GF	GA	GD	Win %
Liga II	4 August 2021	-	Matchday 1	-					—			
Cupa României	18 August 2021	-	Second round	-					—			
Total					0	0	0	0	0	0	+0	—

Last updated: 14 July 2021.
Source: Competitions

=== Liga II ===
==== Standings ====
Pos	Team	Pld	W	D	L	GF	GA	GD	Pts	Promotion or relegation
2	Universitatea Cluj	19	14	0	5	34	14	+20	42	Qualification to Promotion play-off
3	Hermannstadt	19	12	5	2	41	15	+26	41	Qualification to Promotion play-off
4	Steaua București	19	11	4	4	31	13	+18	37	Qualification to Promotion play-off
5	Concordia Chiajna	19	10	6	3	18	10	+8	36	Qualification to Promotion play-off
6	Unirea Slobozia	19	9	6	4	33	13	+20	33	Qualification to Promotion play-off

Source: FRF (in Romanian), Soccerway (in English)
Rules for classification: 1) Points; 2) Head-to-head points; 3) Head-to-head goal difference; 4) Head-to-head goals scored; 5) Head-to-head away goals scored; 6) Goal difference; 7) Goals scored; 8)Play-off.

Pos	Team	Pld	W	D	L	GF	GA	GD	Pts	Qualification
1	Petrolul Ploiești (C, P)	10	3	5	2	9	7	+2	63	Promotion Liga I
2	Hermannstadt (P)	10	5	5	0	14	5	+9	61	Promotion Liga I
3	Universitatea Cluj (O, P)	10	4	3	3	13	9	+4	57	Qualification to play-offs
4	Steaua București (Note: Steaua Bucuresti is ineligible for promotion.)	10	3	4	3	10	10	0	50	
5	Concordia Chiajna	10	2	2	6	8	17	−9	44	Qualification to play-offs
6	Unirea Slobozia	10	1	5	4	6	12	−6	41	

Source: FRF
Rules for classification: 1) Points; 2) Points in the regular season; 3) Head-to-head points; 4) Head-to-head goal difference; 5) Head-to-head goals scored; 6) Head-to-head away goals scored; 7) Goal difference (regular season + play off); 8) Goals scored (regular season + play off); 9) Play-off.
(C) Champions; (O) Play-off winners; (P) Promoted

===== Results by round =====
Round	1	2	3	4	5	6	7	8	9	10	11	12	13	14	15	16	17	18	19	20
Ground	H	A	H	A	H	A	H	A	H	H	A	H	A	H	A	H	A	H	A	A
Result	W	W	W	D	W	L	D	W	W	D	L	D	W	L	L	W	W	W	W	D
Position	8	4	2	3	1	4	5	5	5	5	6	6	6	6	6	6	6	4	4	4

Updated to match(es) played on 31 March 2022. Source:
A = Away; H = Home; W = Win; D = Draw; L = Loss

==== Matches ====
4 August 2021 1	Steaua București (Romania)	1 – 0	(Romania) Miercurea Ciuc	Bucharest, Romania
20:30 EET (UTC+2)	Chipirliu 79'			Stadium: Steaua; Attendance: 3727; Referee: Coza Ionuţ - Cernica

10 August 2021 2	Viitorul Târgu Jiu (Romania)	0 – 2	(Romania) Steaua București	Târgu Jiu, Romania
19:00 EET (UTC+2)			Răsdan 23', 65'	Stadium: Tudor Vladimirescu; Attendance: 1000; Referee: Mazilu Florin Ovidiu

14 August 2021 3	Steaua București (Romania)	5 – 2	(Romania) Dacia Unirea Brăila	Bucharest, Romania
11:30 EET (UTC+2)	Chipirliu 4', 44'; Buhăescu 57'; Băjenaru 67'; Huiban 90'		Gabriel Răducan 5'; Adrian Ilie 54' (o.g.)	Stadium: Steaua; Attendance: 2900; Referee: Vadana Sorin

21 August 2021 4	Unirea Slobozia (Romania)	1 – 1	(Romania) Steaua București	Slobozia, Romania
16:30 EET (UTC+2)	Constantin Toma 32' (pen.)		Chipirliu 36'	Stadium: 1 Mai; Attendance: 2500; Referee: Avram Robert

29 August 2021 5	Steaua București (Romania)	2 – 0	(Romania) Ripensia Timișoara	Bucharest, Romania
14:00 EET (UTC+2)	Răsdan 67'; Buhăescu 90+1'			Stadium: Steaua; Attendance: 2161; Referee: Chioran Marius Nechita

11 September 2021 6	Unirea Dej (Romania)	2 – 1	(Romania) Steaua București	Dej, Romania
15:30 EET (UTC+2)	Alin Burdeț 53'; Mircea Manole 71'		Buhăescu 11'	Stadium: Unirea; Attendance: 1500; Referee: Szabolcs Kovacs

20 September 2021 7	Steaua București (Romania)	0 – 0	(Romania) 1599 Șelimbăr	Bucharest, Romania
18:00 EET (UTC+2)				Stadium: Steaua; Attendance: 1410; Referee: Chitu Marius

24 September 2021 8	FC Brașov (Romania)	0 – 1	(Romania) Steaua București	Brașov, Romania
17:00 EET (UTC+2)			Chipirliu 56'	Stadium: Silviu Ploeșteanu; Attendance: 1500; Referee: Vidican Rares George

2 October 2021 9	Steaua București (Romania)	3 – 0	(Romania) Dunărea Călărași	Bucharest, Romania
11:30 EET (UTC+2)	Chipirliu 59' (pen.), 64'; Robert Neacșu 87'			Stadium: Steaua; Attendance: 900; Referee: Anton Sergiu

16 October 2021 10	Steaua București (Romania)	1 – 1	(Romania) Astra Giurgiu	Bucharest, Romania
15:00 EET (UTC+2)	Chipirliu 40'		Zaharia 50'	Stadium: Steaua; Attendance: 750; Referee: Robu Ovidiu

21 October 2021 11	Petrolul Ploiești (Romania)	2 – 0	(Romania) Steaua București	Ploiești, Romania
19:30 EET (UTC+2)	Sory Ibrahim Diarra 57', 64'			Stadium: Ilie Oană; Attendance: 6000; Referee: Dima Iulian

29 October 2021 12	Steaua București (Romania)	0 – 0	(Romania) Concordia Chiajna	Bucharest, Romania
17:30 EET (UTC+2)				Stadium: Steaua; Attendance: 0 (Behind closed doors); Referee: Găman George Cătălin

6 November 2021 13	Hermannstadt (Romania)	0 – 1	(Romania) Steaua București	Sibiu, Romania
15:00 EET (UTC+2)			Buhăescu 53'	Stadium: Municipal; Attendance: 0 (Behind closed doors); Referee: Rusandu Lucian

23 November 2021 14	Steaua București (Romania)	0 – 1	(Romania) Universitatea Cluj	Bucharest, Romania
17:00 EET (UTC+2)			Albert Hofman 72'	Stadium: Steaua; Attendance: 0 (Behind closed doors); Referee: Coza Ionuţ

28 November 2021 15	ASU Politehnica Timișoara (Romania)	2 – 1	(Romania) Steaua București	Timișoara, Romania
12:00 EET (UTC+2)	Ursu 82'; Mera 88'		Enceanu 29'	Stadium: Dan Păltinișanu; Attendance: Unknown; Referee: Kovacs Szabolcs

4 December 2021 16	Steaua București (Romania)	1 – 0	(Romania) Buzău	Bucharest, Romania
12:30 EET (UTC+2)	Buhăescu 16'			Stadium: Steaua; Attendance: 1000; Referee: Costreie Sorin

26 February 2022 17	Unirea Constanța (Romania)	0 – 5	(Romania) Steaua București	Buftea, Romania
12:30 EET (UTC+2)			Bărbulescu 11'; Beța 51'; Oroian 65'; Neacșu 86'; Popa 90+3'	Stadium: Centrul Național de Fotbal Buftea; Attendance: 400; Referee: Iulian Dima

4 March 2022 18	Steaua București (Romania)	3 – 1	(Romania) Politehnica Iași	Bucharest, Romania
17:30 EET (UTC+2)	Chipirliu 48'; Buhăescu 63'; Popa 66'		Plokhotnyuk 72'	Stadium: Steaua; Attendance: 3500; Referee: Florin Andrei

12 March 2022 19	Metaloglobus București (Romania)	1 – 3	(Romania) Steaua București	Bucharest, Romania
14:00 EET (UTC+2)	Herea 37'		Chipirliu 18', 51' (pen.); Popa 70'	Stadium: Metaloglobus; Attendance: 600; Referee: Coza Ionuţ

==== Play-off matches ====
21 March 2022 1	Concordia Chiajna (Romania)	2 – 2	(Romania) Steaua București	Chiajna, Romania
18:00 EET (UTC+2)	Llullaku 28'; Voicu 52'		Drăghici 26'; Beța 90+1'	Stadium: Concordia; Attendance: 2000; Referee: Kovacs Szabolcs

=== Cupa României ===
18 August 2021 Second round	Progresul Spartac (Romania)	2 – 1	(Romania) Steaua București	Bucharest, Romania
17:00 EET (UTC+2)	Eugen Lixandru 57'; Andrei Ohaci 89'		Chipirliu 65'	Stadium: Progresul Spartac; Attendance: unknown

== Statistics ==
=== Squad appearances and goals ===
Last updated on 31 March 2022.

No.	Pos	Nat	Player	Total		Liga II		Play-off		Cupa României	
No.	Pos	Nat	Player	Apps	Goals	Apps	Goals	Apps	Goals	Apps	Goals
Goalkeepers
1	GK	(Romania) ROU	Raul Bălbărău	19	0	18	0	1	0	0	0
12	GK	(Romania) ROU	Codruţ Sandu	0	0	0	0	0	0	0	0
22	GK	(Romania) ROU	Horia Iancu	0	0	0	0	0	0	0	0
-	GK	(Romania) ROU	Mario Enache	2	0	1	0	0	0	1	0
Defenders
4	DF	(Romania) ROU	Dean Beța	19	2	18	1	1	1	0	0
5	DF	(Romania) ROU	Sergiu Bactăr	4	0	2	0	1	0	1	0
13	DF	(Romania) ROU	Adrian Ilie	14	0	12+1	0	0+1	0	0	0
14	DF	(Romania) ROU	Robert Neacșu	14	2	8+4	2	1	0	1	0
17	DF	(Romania) ROU	Darius Oroian	20	1	15+3	1	1	0	0+1	0
18	DF	(Romania) ROU	George Călințaru	9	0	5+3	0	0	0	1	0
55	DF	(Brazil) BRA	Wallace	18	0	18	0	0	0	0	0
89	DF	(Romania) ROU	Ovidiu Morariu	1	0	0	0	0	0	1	0
Midfielders
6	MF	(Romania) ROU	Mădălin Mihăescu	16	0	3+11	0	0+1	0	0+1	0
8	MF	(Romania) ROU	Valentin Bărbulescu	18	1	16+1	1	1	0	0	0
9	MF	(Romania) ROU	Emilian Pacionel	13	0	5+6	0	0+1	0	0+1	0
10	MF	(Romania) ROU	Rareș Enceanu	15	1	8+6	1	0	0	1	0
16	MF	(Romania) ROU	Andrei Zătreanu	4	0	1+2	0	0	0	1	0
19	MF	(Romania) ROU	Stephan Drăghici	13	1	7+4	0	1	1	0+1	0
20	MF	(Romania) ROU	Florin Răsdan	19	3	8+9	3	0+1	0	1	0
27	MF	(Romania) ROU	Ștefan Pacionel	15	0	10+3	0	1	0	1	0
30	MF	(Romania) ROU	Liviu Băjenaru	12	1	6+6	1	0	0	0	0
32	MF	(Romania) ROU	Claudiu Donose	3	0	2+1	0	0	0	0	0
88	MF	(Romania) ROU	Adrian Popa	11	3	6+4	3	1	0	0	0
90	MF	(Romania) ROU	Alexandru Zaharia	9	0	3+6	0	0	0	0	0
30	MF	(Romania) ROU	Cristian Bustea	3	0	2+1	0	0	0	0	0
Forwards
11	FW	(Romania) ROU	Dragoș Huiban	17	1	8+7	1	0+1	0	1	0
21	FW	(Romania) ROU	Vasile Buhăescu	16	6	11+4	6	1	0	0	0
77	FW	(Romania) ROU	Bogdan Chipirliu	19	12	16+1	11	1	0	0+1	1
99	FW	(Romania) ROU	Cezar Gherghiceanu	1	0	0	0	0	0	1	0
-	FW	(Romania) ROU	Claudiu Dragu	3	0	0+3	0	0	0	0	0
-	FW	(Romania) ROU	Iustin Răducan	1	0	0+1	0	0	0	0	0
