= 2019–20 CSA Steaua București (football) season =

Steaua București
2019–20 season
- President: Mădălin-Sorin Hîncu
- Head coach: Daniel Oprița
- Stadium: Terenul 5
- Liga IV: 1st
- Cupa României: Fourth round
| Home colours | Away colours |

The 2019–20 CSA Steaua București season was the team's 58th season since its founding in 1947. It was suspended in March because of the COVID-19 pandemic in Romania.

On 15 July 2020, AMF Bucharest (Municipal Football Association) decided to freeze the season and declared the first ranked team after 18 rounds, Steaua București, the municipal champion and the participant at the Liga IV promotion play-off. AMF Bucharest also declared Steaua as the winner of Cupa României - Bucharest, because the other 3 teams which were qualified for the semi-finals could not ensure the conditions imposed by the Government for playing the games.

== Players ==
=== First team squad ===
As of 9 September 2020

Note: Flags indicate national team as defined under FIFA eligibility rules; some limited exceptions apply. Players may hold more than one non-FIFA nationality.

| No. | Pos. | Nation | Player |
|---|---|---|---|
| 1 | GK | ROU | Teodor Meilă |
| 22 | GK | ROU | Horia Iancu (Captain) |
| 4 | DF | ROU | Valentin Neaga |
| 5 | DF | ROU | Sergiu Bactăr |
| 13 | DF | ROU | Adrian Ilie |
| 55 | DF | BRA | Wallace |
| 89 | DF | ROU | Ovidiu Morariu |
| 6 | MF | ROU | Mădălin Mihăescu |
| 7 | MF | ROU | Florin Răsdan |
| 8 | MF | ROU | Andrei Neagoe |
| 9 | MF | ROU | Valentin Niculae |
| 10 | MF | ROU | Rareș Enceanu |
| 15 | MF | ROU | Valentin Bărbulescu |

| No. | Pos. | Nation | Player |
|---|---|---|---|
| 16 | MF | ROU | George Ban |
| 17 | MF | ROU | Cosmin Mihai |
| 20 | MF | ROU | Marian Neagu |
| 26 | MF | ROU | Dorin Capotă |
| 30 | MF | ROU | Liviu Băjenaru |
| 99 | MF | ROU | Vlad Nițu |
| — | MF | ROU | Florian Nicolae |
| — | MF | ROU | Petre Capotă |
| 11 | FW | ROU | Andrei Antohi |
| 31 | FW | ROU | Róbert Elek |
| 47 | FW | ROU | Alin Robu |
| 90 | FW | ROU | Alexandru Zaharia |

== Pre-season and friendlies ==
Win Draw Loss

| 20 July 2019 Friendly | Steaua București (Romania) | 2 – 1 | (Romania) Popești Leordeni | Bucharest, Romania |
| 10:00 EET (UTC+2) | Răsdan 27'; Own goal (unknown) | | Andreescu 28' | Stadium: Terenul V |

| 26 July 2019 Friendly | Muscelul Câmpulung (Romania) | 0 – 2 | (Romania) Steaua București | Câmpulung, Romania |
| 17:00 EET (UTC+2) | | | Neagu 30'; Bactăr 63' | Stadium: Stadionul Muscelul |

| 7 August 2019 Friendly | Steaua București (Romania) | 3 – 1 | (Romania) CSM Alexandria | Bucharest, Romania |
| 18:00 EET (UTC+2) | Băjenaru 19'; Right Johnson 72'; Ovidiu Morariu 76' | | | Stadium: Terenul V |

| 10 August 2019 Friendly | Steaua București (Romania) | 4 – 2 | (Romania) CS Balotești | Bucharest, Romania |
| 10:00 EET (UTC+2) | Marian Neagu 46'; Valentin Niculae 73'; Andrei Neagoe 78'; Băjenaru 90' | | | Stadium: Terenul V |

| 22 January 2020 Friendly | Steaua București (Romania) | 1 – 0 | (Romania) Turris Turnu Măgurele | Bucharest, Romania |
| 12:00 EET (UTC+2) | Nițu 81' | | | Stadium: Terenul V |

| 12 February 2020 Friendly | Steaua București (Romania) | 4 – 0 | (Romania) CSM Alexandria | Bucharest, Romania |
| 12:00 EET (UTC+2) | Mihai 24'; Enceanu 41' (pen.); Răsdan 69'; Niculae 84' | | | Stadium: Terenul V |

| 15 February 2020 Friendly | Steaua București (Romania) | 2 – 2 | (Romania) CSM Focșani | Bucharest, Romania |
| 14:00 EET (UTC+2) | Robu 39'; Enceanu 42' | | Mihai Stancu 41'; Ștefan Pădineanu 81' | Stadium: Terenul V |

| 19 February 2020 Friendly | Steaua București (Romania) | 3 – 0 | (Romania) CS Tunari | Bucharest, Romania |
| 12:00 EET (UTC+2) | Zaharia 13'; Răsdan 69'; Elek 90' | | | Stadium: Terenul V |

| 22 February 2020 Friendly | Steaua București (Romania) | 5 – 1 | (Romania) AFC Metalul Buzău | Bucharest, Romania |
| 12:00 EET (UTC+2) | Antohi 64'; Morariu 70'; Răsdan 77', 82'; Mihai 89' | | Unknown | Stadium: Terenul V |

== Competitions ==
Win Draw Loss

=== Liga IV - Bucharest ===
==== Standings ====
| Pos | Team | Pld | W | D | L | GF | GA | GD | Pts | Promotion |
|---|---|---|---|---|---|---|---|---|---|---|
| 1 | Bradu Borca (NT) (P) | 2 | 2 | 0 | 0 | 11 | 1 | +10 | 6 | Promotion to Liga III |
| 2 | Siretul Dolhasca (SV) (Q) | 2 | 0 | 1 | 1 | 1 | 4 | −3 | 1 | Possible promotion to Liga III |
| 3 | Unirea Mircești (IS) | 2 | 0 | 1 | 1 | 2 | 9 | −7 | 1 | |

Source: FRF (in Romanian)
Rules for classification: 1) Points; 2) Head-to-head points; 3) Head-to-head goal difference; 4) Head-to-head goals scored; 5) Head-to-head away goals scored; 6) Goal difference; 7) Goals scored 8) Penalty kicks 8) Penalty kicks.
(P) Promoted; (Q) Qualified for the phase indicated

| Pos | Team | Pld | W | D | L | GF | GA | GD | Pts | Promotion |
|---|---|---|---|---|---|---|---|---|---|---|
| 1 | Dante Botoșani (BT) (P) | 2 | 2 | 0 | 0 | 4 | 1 | +3 | 6 | Promotion to Liga III |
| 2 | Sporting Juniorul Vaslui (VS) (P) | 2 | 1 | 0 | 1 | 4 | 2 | +2 | 3 | Possible promotion to Liga III |
| 3 | Viitorul Curița (BC) | 2 | 0 | 0 | 2 | 0 | 5 | −5 | 0 | |

Source: FRF (in Romanian)
Rules for classification: 1) Points; 2) Head-to-head points; 3) Head-to-head goal difference; 4) Head-to-head goals scored; 5) Head-to-head away goals scored; 6) Goal difference; 7) Goals scored 8) Penalty kicks.
(P) Promoted

| Pos | Team | Pld | W | D | L | GF | GA | GD | Pts | Promotion |
|---|---|---|---|---|---|---|---|---|---|---|
| 1 | Satu Mare (SM) (P) | 2 | 1 | 1 | 0 | 3 | 1 | +2 | 4 | Promotion to Liga III |
| 2 | CA Oradea (BH) (P) | 2 | 1 | 0 | 1 | 3 | 4 | −1 | 3 | Possible promotion to Liga III |
| 3 | Someșul Dej (CJ) | 2 | 0 | 1 | 1 | 1 | 2 | −1 | 1 | |

Source: FRF (in Romanian)
Rules for classification: 1) Points; 2) Head-to-head points; 3) Head-to-head goal difference; 4) Head-to-head goals scored; 5) Head-to-head away goals scored; 6) Goal difference; 7) Goals scored 8) Penalty kicks.
(P) Promoted

| Pos | Team | Pld | W | D | L | GF | GA | GD | Pts | Promotion |
|---|---|---|---|---|---|---|---|---|---|---|
| 1 | Progresul Șomcuta Mare (MM) (P) | 2 | 2 | 0 | 0 | 2 | 0 | +2 | 6 | Promotion to Liga III |
| 2 | Sportul Șimleu Silvaniei (SJ) (P) | 2 | 1 | 0 | 1 | 0 | 2 | −2 | 3 | Possible promotion to Liga III |
| 3 | None (BN) (Note: As the season was suspended due to the COVID-19 pandemic, no team from Bistrița-Năsăud County expressed its interest to participate in the 2020–21 Liga III promotion play-off.) | 2 | 0 | 0 | 2 | 0 | 0 | 0 | 0 | |

Source: FRF (in Romanian)
Rules for classification: 1) Points; 2) Head-to-head points; 3) Head-to-head goal difference; 4) Head-to-head goals scored; 5) Head-to-head away goals scored; 6) Goal difference; 7) Goals scored 8) Penalty kicks.
(P) Promoted
Notes:

| Pos | Team | Pld | W | D | L | GF | GA | GD | Pts | Promotion |
|---|---|---|---|---|---|---|---|---|---|---|
| 1 | Unirea Ungheni (MS) (P) | 2 | 2 | 0 | 0 | 8 | 1 | +7 | 6 | Promotion to Liga III |
| 2 | Măgura Cisnădie (SB) (P) | 2 | 1 | 0 | 1 | 5 | 6 | −1 | 3 | Possible promotion to Liga III |
| 3 | Sepsi OSK II (CV) | 2 | 0 | 0 | 2 | 0 | 6 | −6 | 0 | |

Source: FRF (in Romanian)
Rules for classification: 1) Points; 2) Head-to-head points; 3) Head-to-head goal difference; 4) Head-to-head goals scored; 5) Head-to-head away goals scored; 6) Goal difference; 7) Goals scored 8) Penalty kicks.
(P) Promoted

| Pos | Team | Pld | W | D | L | GF | GA | GD | Pts | Promotion |
|---|---|---|---|---|---|---|---|---|---|---|
| 1 | Corona Brașov (BV) (P) | 2 | 2 | 0 | 0 | 21 | 0 | +21 | 6 | Promotion to Liga III |
| 2 | Ocna Mureș (AB) (P) | 2 | 1 | 0 | 1 | 9 | 6 | +3 | 3 | Possible promotion to Liga III |
| 3 | Gheorgheni (HR) | 2 | 0 | 0 | 2 | 1 | 25 | −24 | 0 | |

Source: FRF (in Romanian)
Rules for classification: 1) Points; 2) Head-to-head points; 3) Head-to-head goal difference; 4) Head-to-head goals scored; 5) Head-to-head away goals scored; 6) Goal difference; 7) Goals scored 8) Penalty kicks.
(P) Promoted

| Pos | Team | Pld | W | D | L | GF | GA | GD | Pts | Promotion |
|---|---|---|---|---|---|---|---|---|---|---|
| 1 | Progresul Ezeriș (CS) (P) | 2 | 1 | 1 | 0 | 4 | 1 | +3 | 4 | Promotion to Liga III |
| 2 | Știința Turceni (GJ) (Q) | 2 | 1 | 0 | 1 | 3 | 4 | −1 | 3 | Possible promotion to Liga III |
| 3 | Victoria Zăbrani (AR) | 2 | 0 | 1 | 1 | 2 | 4 | −2 | 1 | |

Source: FRF (in Romanian)
Rules for classification: 1) Points; 2) Head-to-head points; 3) Head-to-head goal difference; 4) Head-to-head goals scored; 5) Head-to-head away goals scored; 6) Goal difference; 7) Goals scored 8) Penalty kicks.
(P) Promoted; (Q) Qualified for the phase indicated

| Pos | Team | Pld | W | D | L | GF | GA | GD | Pts | Promotion |
|---|---|---|---|---|---|---|---|---|---|---|
| 1 | Avântul Periam (TM) (P) | 2 | 2 | 0 | 0 | 3 | 0 | +3 | 6 | Promotion to Liga III |
| 2 | Jiul Petroșani (HD) (Note: Jiul Petroșani had a positive COVID-19 test inside its squad and lost by forfeit the match against Avântul Periam.) (P) | 2 | 1 | 0 | 1 | 0 | 3 | −3 | 3 | Possible promotion to Liga III |
| 3 | Strehaia (MH) (Note: As the season was suspended due to the COVID-19 pandemic, Mehedinți County representative, Strehaia withdrew from the 2020–21 Liga III promotion play-off, due to the medical expenses needed to comply with the medical protocol.) (D) | 2 | 0 | 0 | 2 | 0 | 0 | 0 | 0 | Expelled |

Source: FRF (in Romanian)
Rules for classification: 1) Points; 2) Head-to-head points; 3) Head-to-head goal difference; 4) Head-to-head goals scored; 5) Head-to-head away goals scored; 6) Goal difference; 7) Goals scored 8) Penalty kicks.
(D) Disqualified; (P) Promoted
Notes:

| Pos | Team | Pld | W | D | L | GF | GA | GD | Pts | Promotion |
|---|---|---|---|---|---|---|---|---|---|---|
| 1 | Voința Budeasa (AG) (P) | 2 | 2 | 0 | 0 | 7 | 0 | +7 | 6 | Promotion to Liga III |
| 2 | Roberto Ziduri (DB) (Q) | 2 | 1 | 0 | 1 | 4 | 3 | +1 | 3 | Possible promotion to Liga III |
| 3 | Unirea Tricolor Dăbuleni (DJ) | 2 | 0 | 0 | 2 | 0 | 8 | −8 | 0 | |

Source: FRF (in Romanian)
Rules for classification: 1) Points; 2) Head-to-head points; 3) Head-to-head goal difference; 4) Head-to-head goals scored; 5) Head-to-head away goals scored; 6) Goal difference; 7) Goals scored 8) Penalty kicks.
(P) Promoted; (Q) Qualified for the phase indicated

| Pos | Team | Pld | W | D | L | GF | GA | GD | Pts | Promotion |
|---|---|---|---|---|---|---|---|---|---|---|
| 1 | Petrolul Potcoava (OT) (P) | 2 | 2 | 0 | 0 | 3 | 0 | +3 | 6 | Promotion to Liga III |
| 2 | Minerul Costești (VL) (Note: Minerul Costești performed COVID-19 tests that were not approved by Romanian Football Federation and lost by forfeit the match against Petrolul Potcoava.) (Q) | 2 | 1 | 0 | 1 | 0 | 3 | −3 | 3 | Possible promotion to Liga III |
| 3 | Unirea Țigănești (TR) (Note: As the season was suspended due to the COVID-19 pandemic, Teleorman County champion, Unirea Țigănești, withdrew from the promotion play-off, due to the medical expenses needed to comply with the medical protocol.) (D) | 2 | 0 | 0 | 2 | 0 | 0 | 0 | 0 | Expelled |

Source: FRF (in Romanian)
Rules for classification: 1) Points; 2) Head-to-head points; 3) Head-to-head goal difference; 4) Head-to-head goals scored; 5) Head-to-head away goals scored; 6) Goal difference; 7) Goals scored 8) Penalty kicks.
(D) Disqualified; (P) Promoted; (Q) Qualified for the phase indicated
Notes:

| Pos | Team | Pld | W | D | L | GF | GA | GD | Pts | Promotion |
|---|---|---|---|---|---|---|---|---|---|---|
| 1 | Oltenița (CL) (P) | 2 | 1 | 1 | 0 | 3 | 2 | +1 | 4 | Promotion to Liga III |
| 2 | Plopeni (PH) (P) | 2 | 1 | 1 | 0 | 3 | 2 | +1 | 4 | Possible promotion to Liga III |
| 3 | Viitorul Domnești (IF) | 2 | 0 | 0 | 2 | 0 | 2 | −2 | 0 | |

Source: FRF (in Romanian)
Rules for classification: 1) Points; 2) Head-to-head points; 3) Head-to-head goal difference; 4) Head-to-head goals scored; 5) Head-to-head away goals scored; 6) Goal difference; 7) Goals scored 8) Penalty kicks.
(P) Promoted

| Pos | Team | Pld | W | D | L | GF | GA | GD | Pts | Promotion |
|---|---|---|---|---|---|---|---|---|---|---|
| 1 | Steaua București (B) (P) | 2 | 2 | 0 | 0 | 14 | 1 | +13 | 6 | Promotion to Liga III |
| 2 | Bărăganul Ciulnița (IL) (Q) | 2 | 1 | 0 | 1 | 3 | 6 | −3 | 3 | Possible promotion to Liga III |
| 3 | Argeșul Mihăilești (GR) | 2 | 0 | 0 | 2 | 1 | 11 | −10 | 0 | |

Source: FRF (in Romanian)
Rules for classification: 1) Points; 2) Head-to-head points; 3) Head-to-head goal difference; 4) Head-to-head goals scored; 5) Head-to-head away goals scored; 6) Goal difference; 7) Goals scored 8) Penalty kicks.
(P) Promoted; (Q) Qualified for the phase indicated

| Pos | Team | Pld | W | D | L | GF | GA | GD | Pts | Promotion |
|---|---|---|---|---|---|---|---|---|---|---|
| 1 | Sportul Chiscani (BR) (P) | 2 | 1 | 1 | 0 | 4 | 3 | +1 | 4 | Promotion to Liga III |
| 2 | Avântul Valea Mărului (GL) (P) | 2 | 1 | 1 | 0 | 2 | 1 | +1 | 4 | Possible promotion to Liga III |
| 3 | Victoria Gugești (VN) | 2 | 0 | 0 | 2 | 4 | 6 | −2 | 0 | |

Source: FRF (in Romanian)
Rules for classification: 1) Points; 2) Head-to-head points; 3) Head-to-head goal difference; 4) Head-to-head goals scored; 5) Head-to-head away goals scored; 6) Goal difference; 7) Goals scored 8) Penalty kicks.
(P) Promoted

| Pos | Team | Pld | W | D | L | GF | GA | GD | Pts | Promotion |
|---|---|---|---|---|---|---|---|---|---|---|
| 1 | Gloria Albești (CT) (P) | 2 | 1 | 1 | 0 | 0 | 0 | 0 | 4 | Promotion to Liga III |
| 2 | Râmnicu Sărat (BZ) (P) | 2 | 1 | 1 | 0 | 0 | 0 | 0 | 4 | Possible promotion to Liga III |
| 3 | Pescărușul Sarichioi (TL) (Note: As the season was suspended due to the COVID-19 pandemic, Tulcea County champion, Pescărușul Sarichioi, withdrew from the promotion play-off, due to the medical expenses needed to comply with the medical protocol.) (D) | 2 | 0 | 0 | 2 | 0 | 0 | 0 | 0 | Expelled |

Source: FRF (in Romanian)
Rules for classification: 1) Points; 2) Head-to-head points; 3) Head-to-head goal difference; 4) Head-to-head goals scored; 5) Head-to-head away goals scored; 6) Goal difference; 7) Goals scored 8) Penalty kicks.
(D) Disqualified; (P) Promoted

==== Matches ====
| 24 August 2019 1 | AFC Rapid (Romania) | 0 – 9 | (Romania) Steaua București | Bucharest, Romania |
| 13:00 EET (UTC+2) | | | Neagu 7'; Răsdan 11', 29'; Elek 18', 41'; Băjenaru 38'; Neagoe 55'; Nițu 66'; Nicolae 78' | Stadium: Complexul Sportiv "Ion Țiriac" |

| 31 August 2019 2 | Steaua București (Romania) | 3 – 0 (forfeit) | (Romania) CS FC Dinamo | Bucharest, Romania |
| 18:00 EET (UTC+2) | | Dinamo showed up with only 6 players. In the 3rd minute of the game, one player from Dinamo couldn't continue the match due to an injury. The referee ended the game and Steaua won 3-0. | | Stadium: Stadionul Colentina |

| 4 September 2019 3 | ACS Electrica (Romania) | 0 – 13 | (Romania) Steaua București | Bucharest, Romania |
| 17:30 EET (UTC+2) | | | Antohi 6', 9', 37'; Capotă 8'; Mihai 41', 47'; Elek 42'; Răsdan 61'; Niculae 72', 88', 89'; Bactăr 79'; Neagu 85' | Stadium: Stadionul Rocar; Attendance: 0 (Behind closed doors) |

| 7 September 2019 4 | Steaua București (Romania) | 13 – 0 | (Romania) ACS Unirea Politehnica | Bucharest, Romania |
| 17:00 EET (UTC+2) | Niculae 5', 44'; Băjenaru 12' (pen.), 35'; Antohi 13', 61', 64'; Răsdan 27', 62', 65'; Elek 79'; Robu 82', 89' | | | Stadium: Terenul V Attendance: 0 (Behind closed doors) |

| 14 September 2019 5 | AFC Comprest GIM (Romania) | 0 – 5 | (Romania) Steaua București | Bucharest, Romania |
| 17:00 EET (UTC+2) | | | Băjenaru 59'; Niculae 79', 83'; Bactăr 87'; Antohi 88' | Stadium: Stadionul Rocar; Attendance: 0 (Behind closed doors) |

| 20 September 2019 6 | Steaua București (Romania) | 4 – 0 | (Romania) FC Rapid II București | Berceni, Romania |
| 19:00 EET (UTC+2) | Neagoe 36'; Răsdan 48'; Elek 61'; Niculae 76' | | | Stadium: Stadionul Berceni |

| 27 September 2019 7 | Steaua București (Romania) | 4 – 0 | (Romania) CS Progresul București 2005 | Berceni, Romania |
| 20:00 EET (UTC+2) | Antohi 13'; Elek 63' (pen.); Enceanu 66'; Răsdan 71' | | | Stadium: Stadionul Berceni |

| 4 October 2019 8 | AS Romprim (Romania) | 1 – 6 | (Romania) Steaua București | Bucharest, Romania |
| 15:00 EET (UTC+2) | Mehmed Cetin 85' | | Enceanu 13', 44'; Antohi 36'; Elek 64', 76' (pen.); Băjenaru 73' | Stadium: Stadionul Romprim; Attendance: 0 (Behind closed doors) |

| 12 October 2019 9 | Steaua București (Romania) | 10 – 0 | (Romania) ACS Rapid FNG | Berceni, Romania |
| 15:00 EET (UTC+2) | Răsdan 32', 37', 48', 50'; Enceanu 41'; Antohi 43', 45'; Băjenaru 65'; Robu 72', 74' | | | Stadium: Stadionul Berceni |

| 18 October 2019 10 | Metaloglobus II (Romania) | 0 – 5 | (Romania) Steaua București | Bucharest, Romania |
| 15:00 EET (UTC+2) | | | Neagoe 4'; Elek 40'; Antohi 71', 79'; Ciutacu 81' (o.g.) | Stadium: Stadionul Metaloglobus; Attendance: 0 (Behind closed doors) |

| 25 October 2019 11 | Steaua București (Romania) | 15 – 0 | (Romania) ACS Power Team | Bucharest, Romania |
| 15:00 EET (UTC+2) | Antohi 3', 7', 12', 35', 52'; Neagoe 18'; Bărbulescu 26'; Răsdan 31', 45', 55', 85'; Niculae 77'; Nițu 83', 83'; Robu 90' | | | Stadium: Terenul V Attendance: 0 (Behind closed doors) |

| 2 November 2019 12 | ACS Sportivii București (Romania) | 0 – 12 | (Romania) Steaua București | Cernica, Romania |
| 15:00 EET (UTC+2) | | | Antohi 1', 88'; Enceanu 4', 45', 56', 66', 87'; Răsdan 29', 35', 62', 83'; Niculae 90' | Stadium: Stadionul Cernica; Attendance: 0 (Behind closed doors) |

| 9 November 2019 13 | Steaua București (Romania) | 5 – 0 | (Romania) AFC Asalt | Berceni, Romania |
| 17:00 EET (UTC+2) | Antohi 23', 38'; Neagu 64'; Enceanu 88', 90+2' (pen.) | | | Stadium: Stadionul Berceni |

| 15 November 2019 14 | ACS Victoria București (Romania) | 0 – 11 | (Romania) Steaua București | Bucharest, Romania |
| 14:00 EET (UTC+2) | | | Niculae 19', 71'; Enceanu 24', 26', 31' (pen.); Antohi 38'; Robu 51'; Bactăr 55'; Bărbulescu 69'; Neagoe 73'; Nițu 80' | Stadium: Stadionul Coresi; Attendance: 0 (Behind closed doors) |

| 23 November 2019 15 | Steaua București (Romania) | 4 – 1 | (Romania) ACS Bucharest United | Berceni, Romania |
| 14:00 EET (UTC+2) | Antohi 10', 57'; Neagoe 24'; Elek 42' | | Aldea 73' | Stadium: Stadionul Berceni |

| 28 November 2019 16 | Steaua București (Romania) | 10 – 2 | (Romania) AFC Rapid | Bucharest, Romania |
| 13:00 EET (UTC+2) | Băjenaru 4', 52'; Bactăr 11'; Niculae 16', 24', 28', 34'; Neagoe 67'; Elek 75', 90+1' | | Richard Pop 54' (pen.); Stan 83' (pen.) | Stadium: Teren V Attendance: 0 (Behind closed doors) |

| 28 February 2020 17 | CS FC Dinamo (Romania) | 1 – 9 | (Romania) Steaua București | Bucharest, Romania |
| 14:00 EET (UTC+2) | Topală 77' | | Zaharia 16'; Răsdan 28', 35', 41', 68'; Antohi 34'; Bărbulescu 35'; Enceanu 54', 66' | Stadium: Stadionul Coresi; Attendance: 0 (Behind closed doors) |

| 7 March 2020 18 | Steaua București (Romania) | 18 – 0 | (Romania) ACS Electrica | Bucharest, Romania |
| 15:00 EET (UTC+2) | Răsdan 5', 55', 58', 64'; Antohi 9', 12', 19', 27', 43'; Enceanu 29', 68', 73'; Zaharia 45', 78'; Alin Robu 52'; Mihăescu 76'; Băjenaru 87'; Elek 90' | | | Stadium: Terenul V |

| 19 | ACS Unirea Politehnica (Romania) | Cancelled | (Romania) Steaua București |

| 20 | Steaua București (Romania) | Cancelled | (Romania) AFC Comprest GIM |

| 21 | FC Rapid II București (Romania) | Cancelled | (Romania) Steaua București |

| 22 | CS Progresul București 2005 (Romania) | Cancelled | (Romania) Steaua București |

| 23 | Steaua București (Romania) | Cancelled | (Romania) AS Romprim |

| 24 | ACS Rapid FNG (Romania) | Cancelled | (Romania) Steaua București |

| 25 | Steaua București (Romania) | Cancelled | (Romania) Metaloglobus II |

| 26 | ACS Power Team (Romania) | Cancelled | (Romania) Steaua București |

| 27 | Steaua București (Romania) | Cancelled | (Romania) ACS Sportivii București |

| 28 | AFC Asalt (Romania) | Cancelled | (Romania) Steaua București |

| 29 | Steaua București (Romania) | Cancelled | (Romania) ACS Victoria București |

| 30 | ACS Bucharest United (Romania) | Cancelled | (Romania) Steaua București |

=== Liga IV promotion play-off ===
==== Region 6 (South) - Group B ====
| Pos | Team | Pld | W | D | L | GF | GA | GD | Pts | Promotion |
|---|---|---|---|---|---|---|---|---|---|---|
| 1 | Steaua București (B) (P) | 2 | 2 | 0 | 0 | 14 | 1 | +13 | 6 | Promotion to Liga III |
| 2 | Bărăganul Ciulnița (IL) (Q) | 2 | 1 | 0 | 1 | 3 | 6 | −3 | 3 | Possible promotion to Liga III |
| 3 | Argeșul Mihăilești (GR) | 2 | 0 | 0 | 2 | 1 | 11 | −10 | 0 | |

Source: FRF (in Romanian)
Rules for classification: 1) Points; 2) Head-to-head points; 3) Head-to-head goal difference; 4) Head-to-head goals scored; 5) Head-to-head away goals scored; 6) Goal difference; 7) Goals scored 8) Penalty kicks.
(P) Promoted; (Q) Qualified for the phase indicated

| 1 August 2020 1 | Steaua București (B) | 8 – 1 | Argeșul Mihăilești (GR) | Modelu |
| 17:30 EEST (UTC+3) | Morariu 2'; Bărbulescu 34'; Răsdan 53'; Băjenaru 55'; Antohi 62', 72'; Nițu 78'; Robu 90+2' | | Rotaru 22' | Stadium: Vasile Enache; Attendance: 0 Referee: Adrian Illyeș (Ploiești) |

| 5 August 2020 2 | Bărăganul Ciulnița (IL) | 0 – 6 | Steaua București (B) | Modelu |
| 17:30 EEST (UTC+3) | | | Neagoe 15', 21'; Antohi 28'; Băjenaru 42', 44'; Enceanu 76' | Stadium: Vasile Enache; Attendance: 0 Referee: Florin Dan (Chirnogi) |

=== Cupa României ===
| 31 July 2019 First round | Steaua București (Romania) | 8 – 0 | (Romania) CS Mihai Bravu | Bucharest, Romania |
| 17:30 EET (UTC+2) | Elek 7', 38', 50'; Răsdan 33'; Valentin Niculae 62'; Alin Robu 63'; Andrei Neagoe 80'; Nițu 89' | | | Stadium: Terenul V |

| 14 August 2019 Second round | Steaua București (Romania) | 2 – 1 | (Romania) Mostiștea Ulmu | Bucharest, Romania |
| 17:30 EET (UTC+2) | Antohi 66'; Băjenaru 90' (pen.) | | | Stadium: Terenul V |

| 28 August 2019 Third round | Steaua București (Romania) | 4 – 0 | (Romania) CS Balotești | Bucharest, Romania |
| 17:30 EET (UTC+2) | Antohi 3'; Elek 29'; Morariu 65'; Enceanu 77' | | | Stadium: Stadionul Colentina |

| 11 September 2019 Fourth round | Steaua București (Romania) | 1 – 2 | (Romania) CS Concordia Chiajna | Berceni, Romania |
| 17:30 EET (UTC+2) | Răsdan 80' | | Grădinaru 87'; Alexandru Nica 114' | Stadium: Stadionul Berceni |

=== Cupa României – Bucharest ===
| 15 October 2019 Round of 16 | Steaua București (Romania) | 24 – 0 | (Romania) AS Tracțiunea | Berceni, Romania |
| 18:00 EET (UTC+2) | Răsdan 5'; Robu 8', 45', 53', 62'; Bactăr 11'; Chirică 12' (o.g.); Niculae 15', 16', 24', 30', 57', 79', 82'; Neagoe 43'; Niţu 48', 81', 84'; Elek 50', 64'; Antohi 61', 70'; Ovidiu Morariu 87', 90' | | | Stadium: Stadionul Berceni; Attendance: 0 (Behind closed doors) |

| 4 December 2019 Quarter-finals | Steaua București (Romania) | 9 – 0 | (Romania) AFC Asalt | Bucharest, Romania |
| 13:00 EET (UTC+2) | Elek 13', 73', 90'; Antohi 23'; Niculae 31'; Răsdan 33', 48'; Niţu 67'; Băjenaru 77' | | | Stadium: Terenul V Attendance: 0 (Behind closed doors) |

| Semi-finals | Steaua București (Romania) | Cancelled | (Romania) ACS Unirea Politehnica |
