= List of CSA Steaua București (football) seasons =

Listed are the seasons of Romanian football club CSA Steaua București since 1947. Both this club and FCSB claim the history through 1998 to be theirs as part of the Steaua București football records dispute.

== Seasons ==
| Season | League | | Cupa României | Supercupa României | Cupa Ligii | Europe | | Coach |
| Season | Division | Pos | Cupa României | Supercupa României | Cupa Ligii | Europe | | Coach |
|---|---|---|---|---|---|---|---|---|
| 1947–48 | Divizia A | 14th | Eighth-finals | not yet founded | not yet founded | | | Braun-Bogdan – Vâlcov |
| 1948–49 | Divizia A | 6th | Winners | not yet founded | not yet founded | | | Vâlcov |
| 1950 | Divizia A | 5th | Winners | not yet founded | not yet founded | | | Rónnay |
| 1951 | Divizia A | Champion | Winners | not yet founded | not yet founded | | | Popescu I |
| 1952 | Divizia A | Champion | Winners | not yet founded | not yet founded | | | Popescu I |
| 1953 | Divizia A | Champion | Final | not yet founded | not yet founded | | | Popescu I |
| 1954 | Divizia A | 2nd | Semi-finals | not yet founded | not yet founded | | | Rónnay – Savu |
| 1955 | Divizia A | 6th | Winners | not yet founded | not yet founded | | | Savu |
| 1956 | Divizia A | Champion | Semi-finals | not yet founded | not yet founded | | | Dobay |
| 1957–58 | Divizia A | 2nd | Quarter-finals | not yet founded | not yet founded | EC | First round | Savu – Niculescu |
| 1958–59 | Divizia A | 3rd | Quarter-finals | not yet founded | not yet founded | | | Popescu I |
| 1959–60 | Divizia A | Champion | Quarter-finals | not yet founded | not yet founded | | | Popescu I |
| 1960–61 | Divizia A | Champion | Semi-finals | not yet founded | not yet founded | EC | Preliminary round | Onisie |
| 1961–62 | Divizia A | 9th | Winners | not yet founded | not yet founded | EC | Preliminary round | Mladin – Popescu I |
| 1962–63 | Divizia A | 2nd | Semi-finals | not yet founded | not yet founded | ECWC | Preliminary round | Onisie |
| 1963–64 | Divizia A | 3rd | Final | not yet founded | not yet founded | | | Ola |
| 1964–65 | Divizia A | 3rd | Eighth-finals | not yet founded | not yet founded | ECWC | Second round | Savu |
| 1965–66 | Divizia A | 12th | Winners | not yet founded | not yet founded | | | Savu |
| 1966–67 | Divizia A | 5th | Winners | not yet founded | not yet founded | ECWC | First round | Savu |
| 1967–68 | Divizia A | Champion | Quarter-finals | not yet founded | not yet founded | ECWC | Second round | Kovács |
| 1968–69 | Divizia A | 4th | Winners | not yet founded | not yet founded | EC | First round | Kovács |
| 1969–70 | Divizia A | 3rd | Winners | not yet founded | not yet founded | ECWC | First round | Kovács |
| 1970–71 | Divizia A | 3rd | Winners | not yet founded | not yet founded | ECWC | Second round | Onisie |
| 1971–72 | Divizia A | 9th | Sixteen-finals | not yet founded | not yet founded | ECWC | Quarter-finals | Stănescu |
| 1972–73 | Divizia A | 6th | Semi-finals | not yet founded | not yet founded | | | Constantin |
| 1973–74 | Divizia A | 6th | Semi-finals | not yet founded | not yet founded | | | Constantin – Teașcă |
| 1974–75 | Divizia A | 5th | Semi-finals | not yet founded | not yet founded | | | Teașcă |
| 1975–76 | Divizia A | Champion | Winners | not yet founded | not yet founded | | | Jenei |
| 1976–77 | Divizia A | 2nd | Final | not yet founded | not yet founded | EC | First round | Jenei |
| 1977–78 | Divizia A | Champion | Eighth-finals | not yet founded | not yet founded | UC | First round | Jenei |
| 1978–79 | Divizia A | 3rd | Winners | not yet founded | not yet founded | EC | Preliminary round | Constantin |
| 1979–80 | Divizia A | 2nd | Final | not yet founded | not yet founded | ECWC | Second round | Constantin |
| 1980–81 | Divizia A | 4th | Quarter-finals | not yet founded | not yet founded | UC | First round | Constantin |
| 1981–82 | Divizia A | 6th | Eighth-finals | not yet founded | not yet founded | | | Traian Ionescu – Cernăianu |
| 1982–83 | Divizia A | 5th | Eighth-finals | not yet founded | not yet founded | | | Cernăianu |
| 1983–84 | Divizia A | 2nd | Final | not yet founded | not yet founded | | | Jenei |
| 1984–85 | Divizia A | Champion | Winners | not yet founded | not yet founded | ECWC | First round | Halagian – Jenei |
| 1985–86 | Divizia A | Champion | Final | not yet founded | not yet founded | EC | Winners | Jenei |
| 1986–87 | Divizia A | Champion | Winners | not yet founded | not yet founded | EC | Second round | Jenei – Iordănescu |
| 1986–87 | Divizia A | Champion | Winners | not yet founded | not yet founded | ESC | Winners | Jenei – Iordănescu |
| 1986–87 | Divizia A | Champion | Winners | not yet founded | not yet founded | IC | Final | Jenei – Iordănescu |
| 1987–88 | Divizia A | Champion | Winners | not yet founded | not yet founded | EC | Semi-finals | Iordănescu |
| 1988–89 | Divizia A | Champion | Winners | not yet founded | not yet founded | EC | Final | Iordănescu |
| 1989–90 | Divizia A | 2nd | Final | not yet founded | not yet founded | EC | Second round | Iordănescu |
| 1990–91 | Divizia A | 2nd | Quarter-finals | not yet founded | not yet founded | ECWC | Second round | Ștefănescu – Hălmageanu – Jenei |
| 1991–92 | Divizia A | 2nd | Winners | not yet founded | not yet founded | UC | Third round | Jenei – Pițurcă |
| 1992–93 | Divizia A | Champion | Quarter-finals | not yet founded | not yet founded | ECWC | Quarter-finals | Iordănescu |
| 1993–94 | Divizia A | Champion | Eighth-finals | not yet founded | not yet founded | UCL | Second round | Jenei |
| 1994–95 | Divizia A | Champion | Eighth-finals | Winners | not yet founded | UCL | 3rd – Group C | Dumitriu |
| 1995–96 | Divizia A | Champion | Winners | Winners | not yet founded | UCL | 3rd – Group C | Dumitriu |
| 1996–97 | Divizia A | Champion | Winners | Not held | not yet founded | UCL | 4th – Group B | Dumitriu |
| 1997–98 | Divizia A | Champion | Quarter-finals | Not held | not yet founded | UCL | Second qualifying round | Stoichiță |
| 1997–98 | Divizia A | Champion | Quarter-finals | Not held | not yet founded | UC | Third round | Stoichiță |
| 1998–99 | Divizia A | 3rd | Winners | Winners | not yet founded | UCL | Second qualifying round | Stoichiță – Jenei |
| 1998–99 | Divizia A | 3rd | Winners | Winners | not yet founded | UC | First round | Stoichiță – Jenei |
| 1999–00 | Divizia A | 3rd | Eighth-finals | Final | not yet founded | UC | Second round | Jenei |
| 2000–01 | Divizia A | Champion | Quarter-finals | Not held | not yet founded | | | Pițurcă |
| 2001–02 | Divizia A | 4th | Semi-finals | Winners | not yet founded | UCL | Third qualifying round | Pițurcă |
| 2001–02 | Divizia A | 4th | Semi-finals | Winners | not yet founded | UC | First round | Pițurcă |
| 2002–03 | Divizia A | 2nd | Eighth-finals | | not yet founded | | | Pițurcă |
2003–17 Not involved in any competitions
| 2017–18 | Liga IV | 2nd | Preliminary | | defunct | | | Ion – Lăcătuș |
| 2018–19 | Liga IV | 2nd | Preliminary | | defunct | | | Lăcătuș |
| 2019–20 | Liga IV | 1st, promoted | Fourth round | | defunct | | | Oprița |
| 2020–21 | Liga III | 1st, promoted | Second Round | | defunct | | | Oprița |
| 2021–22 | Liga II | 4th | Second Round | | defunct | | | Oprița |
| 2022–23 | Liga II | 2nd, ineligible for promotion | Play-off | | defunct | | | Oprița |
