= 2012–13 Cupa României =

Tournament details
- Country: Romania
- Teams: 188

Final positions
- Champions: Petrolul Ploiești
- Runners-up: CFR Cluj

The 2012–13 Cupa României was the seventy-fifth season of the annual Romanian football knockout tournament. The winner of the competition qualifies for the second qualifying round of the 2013–14 UEFA Europa League, if they have not already qualified for European competition; if so then the first non-European place of the 2012–13 Liga I qualifies for the first qualifying round of the 2013–14 UEFA Europa League.

== Round of 32 ==
The 14 winners of the fifth round are joined in this round by the 18 teams from the 2012–13 Liga I. The ties were played on 25–27 September 2012.

| 25 September 2012 | Ceahlăul Piatra Neamț (I) | 4–0 | Gloria Bistrița (I) | Piatra Neamț |
| 16:00 | Mohamed 11'; Velici 44', 86'; Constantinescu 61' | | | Stadium: Ceahlăul; Referee: Adrian Cojocaru |

| 25 September 2012 | Şoimii Pâncota (III) | 2–3 | Concordia Chiajna (I) | Pâncota |
| 16:30 | Mihai 71'; Leucuţa 79' | | Lengyel 32' (o.g.); Simion 45'; Ilie 90+2' | Stadium: Comunal Pâncota; Referee: Dorian Micloşină |

| 25 September 2012 | Dinamo București (I) | 2–1 (a.e.t.) | Voința Sibiu (II) | București |
| 19:00 | Strătilă 62'; Rus 93' | | Heil 51' | Stadium: Dinamo; Referee: Paul Unimatan |

| 25 September 2012 | Petrolul Ploiești (I) | 2–0 | Damila Măciuca (II) | Ploiești |
| 21:30 | Cristea 6'; Marinescu 63' | | | Stadium: Ilie Oană; Referee: George Rădulescu |

| 26 September 2012 | Sportul Studențesc București (II) | 0–1 | Oțelul Galați (I) | București |
| 16:00 | | | Inkango 28' | Stadium: Juventus; Referee: Andrei Chivulete |

| 26 September 2012 | Gaz Metan Mediaș (I) | 2–1 | FC Caracal (III) | Mediaș |
| 16:30 | Bawab 65'; Avram 90' | | Cârnu 74' | Stadium: Gaz Metan; Referee: Mihai Ene |

| 26 September 2012 | Delta Tulcea (II) | 2–1 | Universitatea Cluj (I) | Tulcea |
| 16:30 | Florea 42'; Câju 86' | | Cleiton 63' | Stadium: Delta; Referee: Florin Miron |

| 26 September 2012 | Pandurii Târgu Jiu (I) | 7–1 | FC Zagon (III) | Târgu Jiu |
| 16:30 | Karim 1', 5', 42'; Băcilă 7'; Cristea 30'; Matulevičius 36'; Grigoraș 69' | | Suciu 79' | Stadium: Tudor Vladimirescu; Referee: Eduard Constantinescu |

| 26 September 2012 | CS Turnu Severin (I) | 2–1 | CS Mioveni (II) | Drobeta-Turnu Severin |
| 16:30 | Neacșa 36'; Abba 89' | | E.Dică 90' | Stadium: Municipal; Referee: George Gaman |

| 26 September 2012 | SC Vaslui (I) | 0–1 | FC Botoșani (II) | Vaslui |
| 16:30 | | | Bordeanu 63' | Stadium: Municipal; Referee: Marius Bocăneală |

| 26 September 2012 | FC Brașov (I) | 1–0 | Farul Constanța (II) | Brașov |
| 19:00 | Buga 22' | | | Stadium: Tineretului; Referee: Florin Marcu |

| 26 September 2012 | ACS Berceni (III) | 0–2 | CFR Cluj (I) | Berceni |
| 19:00 | | | Aguirregaray 76', 90+1' | Stadium: Comunal; Referee: Teodor Dragoş |

| 27 September 2012 | CF Brăila (II) | 0–0 (a.e.t.) (6–5 p) | Viitorul Constanța (I) | Brăila |
| 16:00 | | | | Stadium: Municipal; Attendance: 4,000; Referee: Iulian Călin |

| 27 September 2012 | Studențesc Iași (I) | 1–4 | Astra Giurgiu (I) | Iași |
| 17:00 | Herghelegiu 9' | | Tembo 50'; Găman 61'; Ivanovski 65'; Fatai 87' | Stadium: Emil Alexandrescu; Referee: Cătălin Popa |

| 27 September 2012 | Rapid București (I) | 6–0 | Olimpia Satu Mare (III) | București |
| 19:00 | Ioniță 25', 31'; Renan 35', 54', 72'; Ciolacu 75' | | | Stadium: Giulești; Referee: Dan Dreve |

| 27 September 2012 | Steaua București (I) | 3–1 | FCM Târgu Mureş (II) | București |
| 21:30 | Costea 12' (pen.), 50'; Nikolić 48' | | Dîlbea 40' | Stadium: Ghencea; Referee: Lucian Rusandu |

== Round of 16 ==
The draw for the Round of 16 took place on 3 October 2012. The draw featured the 16 winners of the Round of 32. The matches were played from 30 October to 1 November 2012

| 30 October 2012 | Astra Giurgiu (I) | 5–1 | CS Turnu Severin (I) | Giurgiu |
| 18:30 | Distéfano 10'; Takayuki 68'; Budescu 70', 73'; Yahaya 78' | | Olah 20' | Stadium: Marin Anastasovici; Referee: Marcel Bîrsan |

| 30 October 2012 | FC Brașov (I) | 0–2 | Petrolul Ploiești (I) | Brașov |
| 18:45 | | | Ad. Cristea 1'; Bokila 63' | Stadium: Tineretului; Referee: Adrian Cojocaru |

| 30 October 2012 | Rapid București (I) | 4–1 | Delta Tulcea (II) | București |
| 21:30 | Mişelăricu 4' (o.g.); Crețu 22' (o.g.); Goga 24'; Pancu 90+3' | | Florea 40' (pen.) | Stadium: Giulești; Referee: Dragoș Teodor |

| 31 October 2012 | Ceahlăul Piatra Neamț (I) | 2–0 | Gaz Metan Mediaș (I) | Piatra Neamț |
| 18:30 | Bădescu 77'; Lukanović 78' | | | Stadium: Ceahlăul; Referee: Radu Marian Petrescu |

| 31 October 2012 | CFR Cluj (I) | 2–0 | FC Botoșani (II) | Cluj-Napoca |
| 18:45 | Bjelanović 57'; Luís Alberto 62' | | | Stadium: Gruia; Referee: Teodor Crăciunescu |

| 31 October 2012 | Concordia Chiajna (I) | 0–0 (a.e.t.) (4–3 p) | Steaua București (I) | Chiajna |
| 21:30 | | | | Stadium: Concordia; Referee: Marian Balaci |
| | Penalties |
| | Pană (penalty scored); Ispir (penalty scored); Belu (penalty scored); Damian (penalty missed); Zuluf (penalty scored) | | Nikolić (penalty scored); Pârvulescu (penalty scored); Filip (penalty scored); Chipciu (penalty missed); Tănase (penalty missed) |

| 1 November 2012 | Oțelul Galați (I) | 3–0 | CF Brăila (II) | Galați |
| 18:45 | Băjenaru 24', 62'; Didi 88' | | | Stadium: Oțelul; Referee: George Gaman |

| 1 November 2012 | Pandurii Târgu Jiu (I) | 1–2 | Dinamo București (I) | Târgu Jiu |
| 21:30 | Lemnaru 73' | | Alexe 37'; Mamele 90+2' (o.g.) | Stadium: Tudor Vladimirescu; Referee: Istvan Kovacs |

== Quarter-finals ==
The draw for the quarter-finals, semi-finals and final (to determine the "home" team) took place on 6 November 2012. The draw featured the 8 winners from the previous round, all from Liga I. The matches will be played on 27–29 November 2012.

| 27 November 2012 | Petrolul Ploiești | 2–1 | Concordia Chiajna | Ploiești |
| 20:30 | Bokila 44', 54' | | Purece 82' (pen.) | Stadium: Ilie Oană; Attendance: 7,500; Referee: Radu Marian Petrescu |

| 28 November 2012 | Ceahlăul Piatra Neamț | 0–2 | Oțelul Galați | Piatra Neamț |
| 17:45 | | | Iorga 11'; Băjenaru 65' | Stadium: Ceahlăul; Attendance: 1,500; Referee: Marcel Bîrsan |

| 28 November 2012 | CFR Cluj | 2–1 (a.e.t.) | Dinamo București | Cluj-Napoca |
| 20:30 | Bastos 66'; Mureșan 101' | | Alexe 62' | Stadium: Gruia; Attendance: 5,000; Referee: Sebastian Colțescu |

| 29 November 2012 | Rapid București | 2–3 (a.e.t.) | Astra Giurgiu | București |
| 20:30 | Oros 65'; Bărboianu 75' (o.g.) | | Budescu 4'; Fatai 49'; Mureșan 111' | Stadium: Giulești; Attendance: 7,000; Referee: Ovidiu Haţegan |

== Semi-finals ==
=== 1st leg ===
| 16 April 2013 | CFR Cluj | 0–0 | Astra Giurgiu | Cluj-Napoca |
| 20:30 | | | | Stadium: Gruia; Attendance: 4.000; Referee: Istvan Kovacs |

| 18 April 2013 | Oțelul Galați | 0–3 | Petrolul Ploiești | Galați |
| 20:30 | | | Alves 3'; Cojoc 60' (o.g.); Bokila 71' | Stadium: Stadionul Oțelul; Attendance: 4.000; Referee: Radu Marian Petrescu |

=== 2nd leg ===
| 21 May 2013 | Petrolul Ploiești | 1–2 (4–2 agg.) | Oțelul Galați | Ploiești |
| 20:30 | Bokila 57' | | Paraschiv 9'; Iorga 89' (pen.) | Stadium: Ilie Oană; Attendance: 9.000; Referee: Cristian Pavel Balaj |

| 22 May 2013 | Astra Giurgiu | 0–2 (0–2 agg.) | CFR Cluj | Giurgiu |
| 20:30 | | | Hora 21'; Valente 90' | Stadium: Marin Anastasovici |

== Final ==
| 1 June 2013 | Petrolul Ploiești | 1–0 | CFR Cluj | București |
| 20:45 EET | Bokila 8' | | | Stadium: Arena Națională; Attendance: 29,343; Referee: Pavel Cristian Balaj |
