= Adrian Popa (footballer, born 1988) =

Romanian footballer (born 1988)

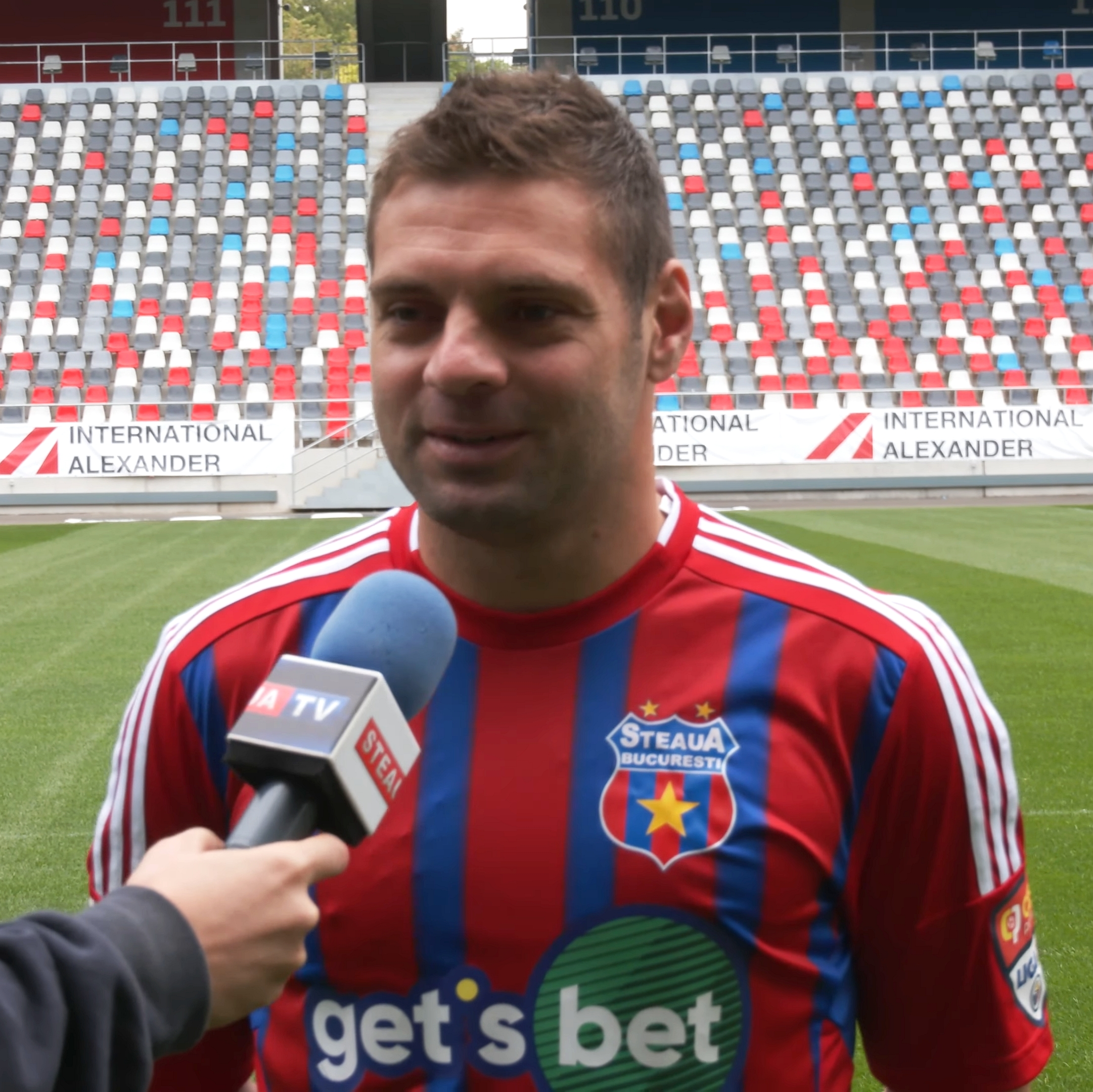
- Popa in 2021

Personal information
- Date of birth: 24 July 1988 (age 38)
- Place of birth: Bucharest, Romania
- Height: 1.70 m (5 ft 7 in)
- Position: Winger

Youth career
- 2000–2005: CSȘ 1 Pajura

Senior career*
| Years | Team | Apps | (Gls) |
| 2005–2009 | Politehnica II Timișoara | 87 | (26) |
| 2007–2008 | → CS Buftea (loan) | 11 | (2) |
| 2009 | → Gloria Buzău (loan) | 12 | (1) |
| 2009–2010 | Universitatea Cluj | 24 | (3) |
| 2010–2012 | Concordia Chiajna | 60 | (10) |
| 2012–2017 | Steaua București | 137 | (20) |
| 2017–2020 | Reading | 15 | (1) |
| 2018 | → Al-Taawoun (loan) | 10 | (2) |
| 2019 | → Ludogorets Razgrad (loan) | 13 | (0) |
| 2019–2020 | → FCSB (loan) | 17 | (2) |
| 2020–2021 | Voluntari | 8 | (2) |
| 2021 | Academica Clinceni | 19 | (2) |
| 2021–2023 | CSA Steaua București | 47 | (11) |
| 2023–2024 | Concordia Chiajna | 5 | (0) |
| 2024–2026 | CSA Steaua București | 48 | (3) |
| Total | | 519 | (84) |

International career
| 2012–2017 | Romania | 24 | (4) |
- * Club domestic league appearances and goals as of 16 May 2026

Adrian Popa (born 24 July 1988) is a former Romanian professional footballer who played as a winger.

== Club career ==
On 15 August 2012, Popa signed a five-year contract with FCSB for an undisclosed transfer fee. One week later, he scored his first goal for the club in a 2–0 away victory against FK Ekranas in the Europa League play-off round's first leg.

On 27 January 2017, it was announced that Popa agreed to transfer to English club Reading after reaching the final six months of his contract with FCSB. The transfer was made official three days later, with Popa signing with Reading until the summer of 2020. On 17 March 2017, he scored Reading's second in injury time in a 2–0 victory against Sheffield Wednesday at the Hillsborough Stadium.

=== Loan moves ===
On 29 January 2018, Reading confirmed that Popa had joined Saudi Arabian club Al-Taawon on loan until the end of the 2017–18 season.

The same year on 20 December, Popa moved on another loan, this time to Ludogorets Razgrad, for the rest of the 2018–19 season. On 18 January 2019, he scored his first goal for the club in a 4–2 friendly victory against Hungarian club Kispest Honvéd FC.

=== Return to Romania ===
On 16 October 2020, Popa signed a one-year contract with FC Voluntari. On 22 September 2021, Popa signed a two-year contract with his childhood team, Steaua București.

== International career ==
Popa made his debut for the Romania senior team during a 2014 FIFA World Cup qualification against Netherlands in October 2012.

== Personal life ==
In April 2024, Popa and his wife welcomed their child.

== Career statistics ==
=== Club ===
As of match played 16 May 2026

Appearances and goals by club, season and competition
| Club | Season | League | | | National cup (Note: Includes Cupa României, Bulgarian Cup) | | League cup (Note: Includes Cupa Ligii, EFL Cup) | | Europe | | Other | | Total | |
| Club | Season | Division | Apps | Goals | Apps | Goals | Apps | Goals | Apps | Goals | Apps | Goals | Apps | Goals |
|---|---|---|---|---|---|---|---|---|---|---|---|---|---|---|
| Politehnica II Timișoara | 2005–06 | Divizia B | ? | ? | — | | — | | — | | — | | ? | ? |
| Politehnica II Timișoara | 2006–07 | Liga II | ? | ? | — | | — | | — | | — | | ? | ? |
| Politehnica II Timișoara | 2007–08 | Liga II | ? | ? | — | | — | | — | | — | | ? | ? |
| Politehnica II Timișoara | Total | | 87 | 29 | — | | — | | — | | — | | 87 | 29 |
| CS Buftea (loan) | 2007–08 | Liga III | ? | ? | ? | ? | — | | — | | — | | ? | ? |
| CS Buftea (loan) | 2008–09 | Liga II | 11 | 2 | 0 | 0 | — | | — | | — | | 11 | 2 |
| CS Buftea (loan) | Total | | 11 | 2 | 0 | 0 | — | | — | | — | | 11 | 2 |
| Gloria Buzău (loan) | 2008–09 | Liga I | 12 | 1 | — | | — | | — | | — | | 12 | 1 |
| Universitatea Cluj | 2009–10 | Liga II | 24 | 3 | 0 | 0 | — | | — | | — | | 24 | 3 |
| Concordia Chiajna | 2011–12 | Liga II | 27 | 4 | 0 | 0 | — | | — | | — | | 27 | 4 |
| Concordia Chiajna | 2011–12 | Liga I | 29 | 3 | 1 | 1 | — | | — | | — | | 30 | 4 |
| Concordia Chiajna | 2012–13 | Liga I | 4 | 3 | — | | — | | — | | — | | 4 | 3 |
| Concordia Chiajna | Total | | 60 | 10 | 1 | 1 | — | | — | | — | | 61 | 11 |
| Steaua București | 2012–13 | Liga I | 30 | 1 | 2 | 0 | — | | 11 (Note: Appearance(s) in UEFA Europa League) | 1 | — | | 43 | 2 |
| Steaua București | 2013–14 | Liga I | 28 | 7 | 5 | 0 | — | | 11 (Note: Appearances in UEFA Champions League) | 0 | 1 (Note: Appearance in Supercupa României) | 0 | 45 | 7 |
| Steaua București | 2014–15 | Liga I | 28 | 5 | 4 | 3 | 3 | 0 | 10 (Note: Five appearances in UEFA Champions League, five appearances in UEFA Europa League) | 0 | 0 | 0 | 45 | 8 |
| Steaua București | 2015–16 | Liga I | 32 | 4 | 5 | 0 | 3 | 0 | 6 (Note: Four appearances in UEFA Champions League, two appearances and one goal in UEFA Europa League) | 1 | 0 | 0 | 46 | 5 |
| Steaua București | 2016–17 | Liga I | 19 | 3 | 1 | 0 | 1 | 0 | 10 (Note: Four appearances in UEFA Champions League, six appearances in UEFA Europa League) | 0 | — | | 31 | 3 |
| Steaua București | Total | | 137 | 20 | 17 | 3 | 7 | 0 | 48 | 2 | 1 | 0 | 230 | 28 |
| Reading | 2016–17 | EFL Championship | 8 | 1 | — | | — | | — | | 0 | 0 | 8 | 1 |
| Reading | 2017–18 | EFL Championship | 6 | 0 | 0 | 0 | 2 | 0 | — | | — | | 8 | 0 |
| Reading | 2018–19 | EFL Championship | 1 | 0 | 0 | 0 | 0 | 0 | — | | — | | 1 | 0 |
| Reading | Total | | 15 | 1 | 0 | 0 | 2 | 0 | — | | 0 | 0 | 17 | 1 |
| Al-Taawoun (loan) | 2017–18 | Saudi Professional League | 9 | 0 | — | | — | | — | | — | | 9 | 0 |
| Ludogorets Razgrad (loan) | 2018–19 | Bulgarian First League | 13 | 0 | 1 | 0 | — | | — | | — | | 14 | 0 |
| FCSB (loan) | 2019–20 | Liga I | 17 | 2 | 2 | 1 | — | | 1 | 0 | — | | 20 | 3 |
| Voluntari | 2020–21 | Liga I | 8 | 2 | 0 | 0 | — | | — | | — | | 8 | 2 |
| Academica Clinceni | 2020–21 | Liga I | 19 | 2 | — | | — | | — | | — | | 19 | 2 |
| CSA Steaua București | 2021–22 | Liga II | 19 | 5 | 0 | 0 | — | | — | | — | | 19 | 5 |
| CSA Steaua București | 2022–23 | Liga II | 28 | 6 | 1 | 1 | — | | — | | — | | 29 | 7 |
| CSA Steaua București | Total | | 47 | 11 | 1 | 1 | — | | — | | — | | 49 | 12 |
| Concordia Chiajna | 2023–24 | Liga II | 5 | 0 | 0 | 0 | — | | — | | — | | 5 | 0 |
| CSA Steaua București | 2023–24 | Liga II | 7 | 0 | — | | — | | — | | — | | 7 | 0 |
| CSA Steaua București | 2024–25 | Liga II | 23 | 2 | 1 | 0 | — | | — | | — | | 24 | 2 |
| CSA Steaua București | 2025–26 | Liga II | 18 | 1 | 1 | 0 | — | | — | | — | | 19 | 1 |
| CSA Steaua București | Total | | 48 | 3 | 2 | 0 | — | | — | | — | | 50 | 3 |
| Career total | | | 519 | 84 | 24 | 6 | 9 | 0 | 49 | 2 | 1 | 0 | 595 | 92 |

=== International ===
Appearances and goals by national team and year
| National team | Year | Apps | Goals |
|---|---|---|---|
| Romania | 2012 | 1 | 0 |
| Romania | 2013 | 3 | 0 |
| Romania | 2014 | 1 | 0 |
| Romania | 2015 | 7 | 1 |
| Romania | 2016 | 11 | 3 |
| Romania | 2017 | 1 | 0 |
| Total | | 24 | 4 |

Scores and results list Romania's goal tally first, score column indicates score after each Popa goal.

List of international goals scored by Adrian Popa
| No. | Date | Venue | Cap | Opponent | Score | Result | Competition |
|---|---|---|---|---|---|---|---|
| 1 | 14 February 2015 | Mardan Sports Complex, Aksu, Turkey | 7 | Moldova | 2–0 | 2–1 | Friendly |
| 2 | 3 June 2016 | Arena Națională, Bucharest, Romania | 14 | Georgia | 1–0 | 5–1 | Friendly |
| 3 | 4 September 2016 | Cluj Arena, Cluj-Napoca, Romania | 17 | Montenegro | 1–0 | 1–1 | 2018 FIFA World Cup qualification |
| 4 | 8 October 2016 | Vazgen Sargsyan, Yerevan, Armenia | 18 | Armenia | 2–0 | 5–0 | 2018 FIFA World Cup qualification |

== Honours ==
FCSB

- Liga I: 2012–13, 2013–14, 2014–15
- Cupa României: 2014–15, 2019–20
- Cupa Ligii: 2014–15, 2015–16
- Supercupa României: 2013

Ludogorets Razgrad

- Bulgarian First League: 2018–19
