= Cristian Bustea =

Romanian footballer (born 1994)

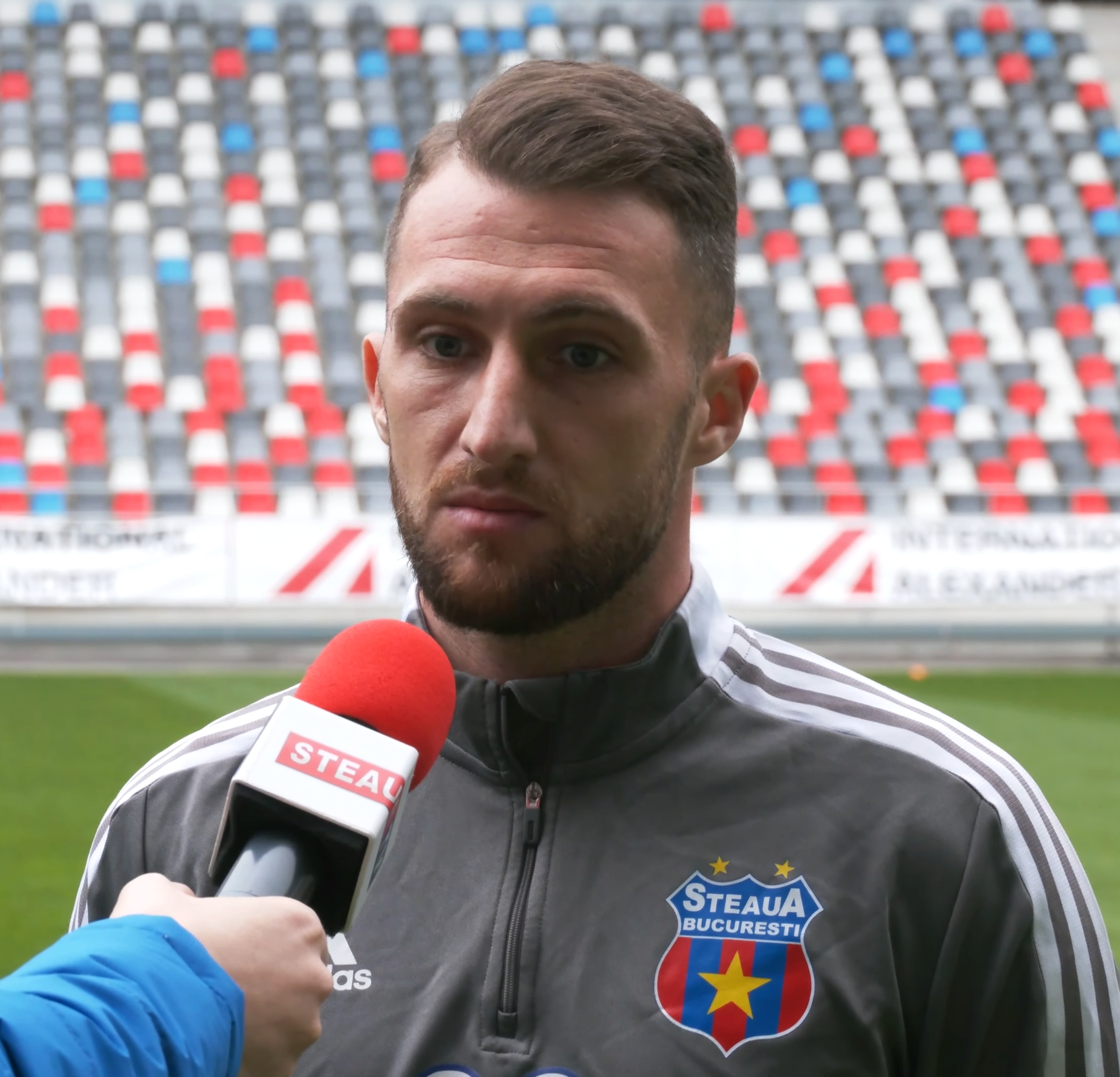
- Cristian Bustea in 2022

Personal information
- Full name: Sorin Cristian Bustea
- Date of birth: 22 December 1994 (age 31)
- Place of birth: Bucharest, Romania
- Height: 1.75 m (5 ft 9 in)
- Positions: Left-back; midfielder

Youth career
- –2011: Juventus București

Senior career*
Years	Team	Apps	(Gls)
2011–2019	Daco-Getica București	72	(11)
2017–2018	→ Sportul Snagov (loan)	30	(8)
2019–2022	UTA Arad	48	(4)
2022–2023	CSA Steaua București	10	(0)
2023–2024	Tunari	21	(0)
2024	Mioveni	11	(1)
2025	AFC Câmpulung Muscel	7	(1)
- * Club domestic league appearances and goals as of 18 April 2025

Sorin Cristian Bustea (born 22 December 1994) is a Romanian professional footballer who plays as a midfielder for Liga II club AFC Câmpulung Muscel.

== Honours ==
Juventus București

- Liga II: 2016–17
- Liga III: 2015–16

UTA Arad

- Liga II: 2019–20
