= Stadionul Berceni =

Football stadium in Berceni, Romania

Coordinates: 44°18′31″N 26°11′02″E

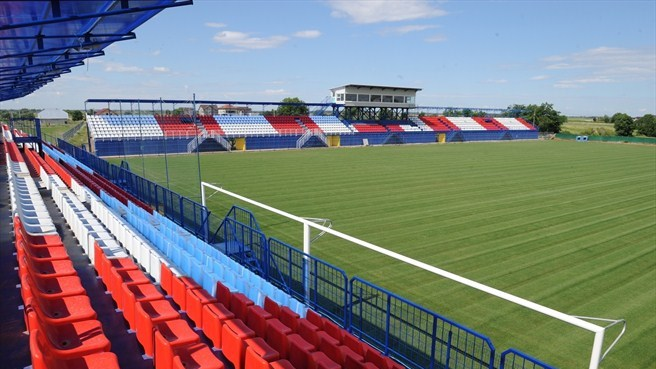
- Interactive map of Stadionul Berceni
- Location: Berceni, Ilfov County, Romania
- Owner: Berceni Municipality
- Capacity: 2,700
- Surface: grass

Construction
- Opened: 1957
- Renovated: 2008

Tenant
- ACS Berceni (2008–2016)

Berceni Stadium is a football stadium in Berceni, Ilfov County, Romania. The stadium holds 2,700 people.

The home was the ground of second division side ACS Berceni until 2016, the Stadionul Berceni stage three group matches at the 2011 UEFA European Under-19 Football Championship.
