= George Călințaru =

Romanian footballer

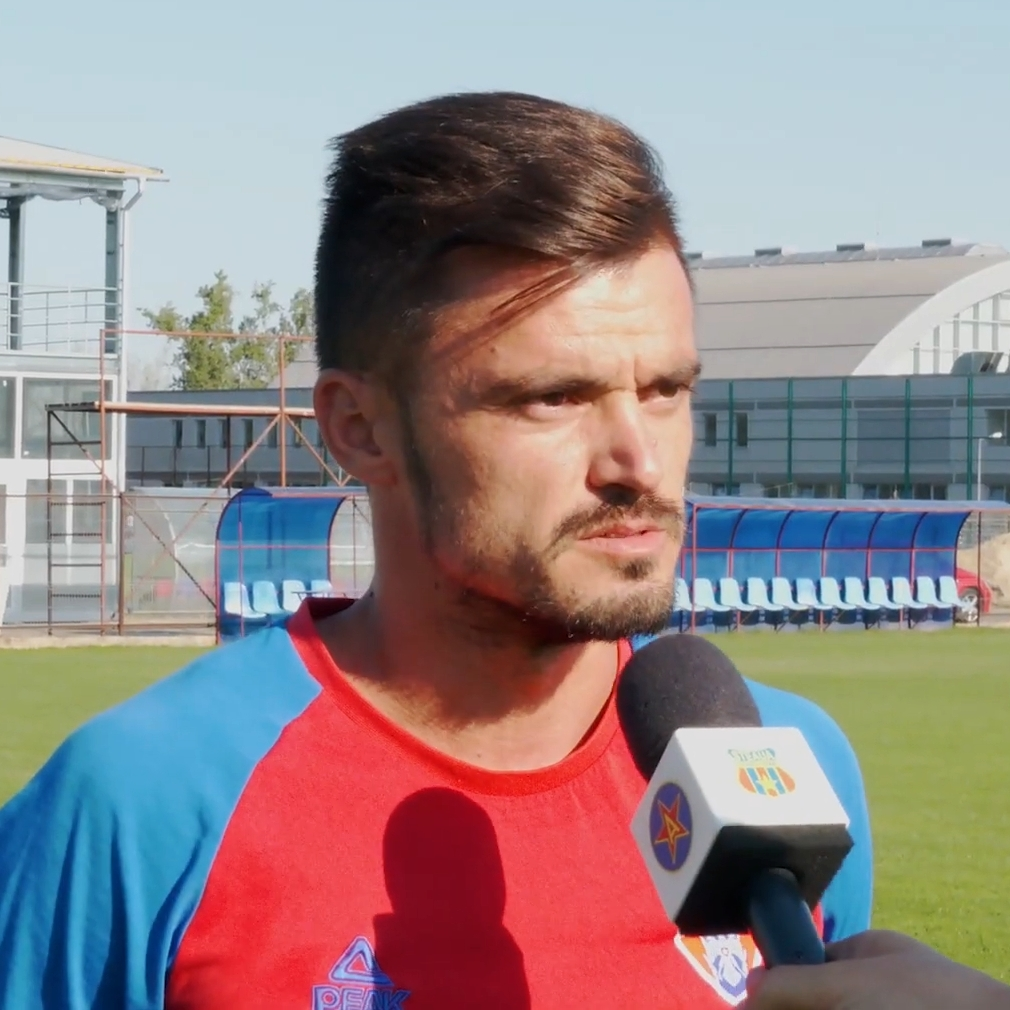
- George Călințaru in 2020

Personal information
- Date of birth: 26 February 1989 (age 37)
- Place of birth: Bucharest, Romania
- Height: 1.75 m (5 ft 9 in)
- Position: Midfielder

Team information
- Current team: Concordia Chiajna
- Number: 22

Youth career
- 1999–2005: Juventus București

Senior career*
Years	Team	Apps	(Gls)
2005–2010	Juventus București	48	(12)
2011	Victoria Brănești	7	(0)
2011–2012	Viitorul Constanța	16	(1)
2013	Farul Constanța	10	(3)
2013–2016	Voluntari	31	(5)
2016–2017	Juventus București	45	(8)
2018	Farul Constanța	13	(5)
2018–2019	Daco-Getica București	37	(3)
2019–2020	Turris Turnu Măgurele	25	(0)
2020–2022	Steaua București	23	(1)
2022–2023	Concordia Chiajna	9	(0)
Total		264	(38)

International career
2005–2006	Romania U17	3	(0)
- * Club domestic league appearances and goals as of 1 June 2023

George Călințaru (born 26 February 1989) is a Romanian former professional footballer who played as a midfielder.

== Honours ==
CSA Steaua București

- Liga III: 2020–21
