= Philippe Nsiah =

French footballer (born 1994)

Personal information
- Date of birth: 24 October 1994 (age 32)
- Place of birth: Paris, France
- Height: 1.86 m (6 ft 1 in)
- Position: Forward

Team information
- Current team: Viitorul Târgu Jiu

Youth career
- Paris Saint-Germain
- Racing Colombes
- Angers

Senior career*
| Years | Team | Apps | (Gls) |
| 2013–2015 | Vertou | ? | (?) |
| 2015–2016 | Franconville FC | ? | (?) |
| 2016–2017 | La Châtaigneraie | ? | (?) |
| 2017–2018 | La Flèche | 16 | (2) |
| 2018 | Pandurii Târgu Jiu | 19 | (4) |
| 2019 | Daco-Getica București | 16 | (8) |
| 2019 | Academica Clinceni | 11 | (1) |
| 2020 | Đà Nẵng | 2 | (0) |
| 2020 | Đông Á Thanh Hóa | 0 | (0) |
| 2020–2021 | Concordia Chiajna | 10 | (1) |
| 2021 | Steaua București | 4 | (0) |
| 2022 | Anagennisi Deryneia | | |
| 2023– | Viitorul Târgu Jiu | 9 | (2) |
- * Club domestic league appearances and goals as of 1 June 2023

Philippe Nsiah (born 24 October 1994) is a French professional footballer who plays as a forward for Romanian side Viitorul Târgu Jiu. In his career Nsiah also played for teams such as La Flèche, Pandurii Târgu Jiu or Daco-Getica București.

== Honours ==
CSA Steaua București

- Liga III: 2020–21
