= Andrei Neagoe =

Romanian footballer

Personal information
- Date of birth: 24 April 1987 (age 39)
- Place of birth: Piteşti, Romania
- Height: 1.78 m (5 ft 10 in)
- Position: Left midfielder

Youth career
- 2004–2005: CCJ "Leo.Ianovschi"

Senior career*
Years	Team	Apps	(Gls)
2005	Dacia Mioveni	8	(0)
2006	Argeș Pitești	1	(0)
2006	Unirea Urziceni	1	(0)
2007	Național București	5	(0)
2007–2008	Dacia Mioveni	13	(0)
2008–2009	Unirea Urziceni	0	(0)
2010	CSMS Iași	4	(0)
2011	UTA Arad	14	(4)
2012	Farul Constanța	8	(2)
2012–2013	Râmnicu Vâlcea	21	(1)
2013–2014	Metalul Reșița	33	(1)
2015–2016	Râmnicu Vâlcea	36	(8)
2016–2017	Chindia Târgoviște	16	(0)
2017–2018	Mioveni	33	(2)
2018	Farul Constanța	1	(0)
2018–2019	Afumați	?	(?)
2019–2021	Steaua București	?	(?)
- * Club domestic league appearances and goals as of 18 January 2018

Andrei Neagoe (born 24 April 1987) is a Romanian footballer who played as a midfielder for CSA Steaua București.

== Personal life ==
He has a brother, Robert Neagoe, who also plays football.
