= Dean Beța =

Romanian footballer

Dean Beţa
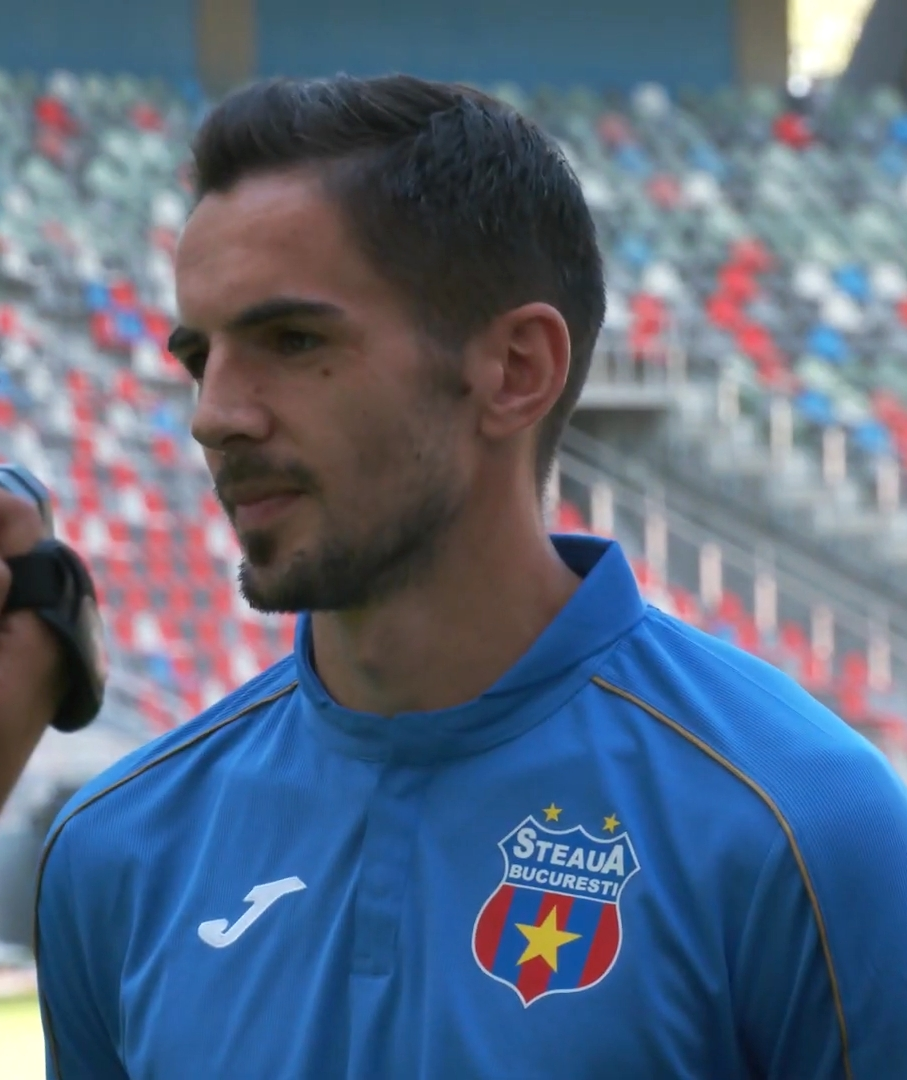
- Dean Beța in 2020

Personal information
- Full name: Marian Dean Beța
- Date of birth: 11 May 1991 (age 35)
- Place of birth: Reșița, Romania
- Height: 1.75 m (5 ft 9 in)
- Position: Defender

Team information
- Current team: CSA Steaua București
- Number: 4

Youth career
- 2001–2007: FCM Reșița

Senior career*
Years	Team	Apps	(Gls)
2007–2008	FCM Reșița	11	(0)
2008–2013	Sportul Studențesc	45	(0)
2013–2016	Petrolul Ploiești	28	(0)
2016–2018	Juventus București	42	(1)
2019–2020	Mioveni	37	(0)
2020–	CSA Steaua București	105	(3)

International career
2007–2008	Romania U17	6	(0)
2008–2010	Romania U19	4	(0)
2011–2012	Romania U21	8	(0)
- * Club domestic league appearances and goals as of 16 August 2025

Marian Dean Beța (born 11 May 1991) is a Romanian professional footballer who plays as a defender for Liga II club CSA Steaua București.

== Honours ==
Juventus București

- Liga II: 2016–17

CSA Steaua București

- Liga III: 2020–21
