= Róbert Elek =

Romanian footballer

Personal information
- Date of birth: 13 June 1988 (age 38)
- Place of birth: Târgu Secuiesc, Romania
- Height: 1.82 m (6 ft 0 in)
- Position: Striker

Team information
- Current team: Ciucaș Tărlungeni
- Number: 17

Youth career
- 2000–2003: Fortyogo Târgu Secuiesc
- 2003–2004: Ojdula Covasna
- 2004: CS Târgu Secuiesc

Senior career*
Years	Team	Apps	(Gls)
2005	Poiana Câmpina	0	(0)
2006–2011	Oțelul Galați	52	(2)
2007	→ CF Brăila (loan)	16	(1)
2009	→ Petrolul Ploiești (loan)	15	(5)
2010	→ Bihor Oradea (loan)	10	(3)
2011	→ Politehnica Iași (loan)	0	(0)
2011–2012	Corona Brașov	0	(0)
2012–2013	Fortuna Covaci	0	(0)
2013–2014	Unirea Tărlungeni	41	(17)
2015–2016	Poli Timișoara	50	(9)
2016–2017	Botoșani	16	(1)
2018	Juventus București	9	(1)
2018–2019	Sportul Snagov	15	(3)
2019–2021	Steaua București	19	(13)
2021–2022	SR Brașov	12	(8)
2022–	Ciucaș Tărlungeni	74	(28)

Managerial career
- 2021: SR Brașov
- * Club domestic league appearances and goals as of 07:45, 21 June 2022 (UTC)

Róbert Elek (born 13 June 1988) is a Romanian professional footballer who plays for Ciucaș Tărlungeni as a striker.
