= Berceni, Ilfov =

Berceni
- Commune
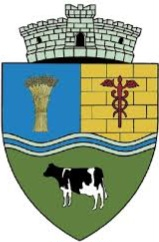
- Coat of arms

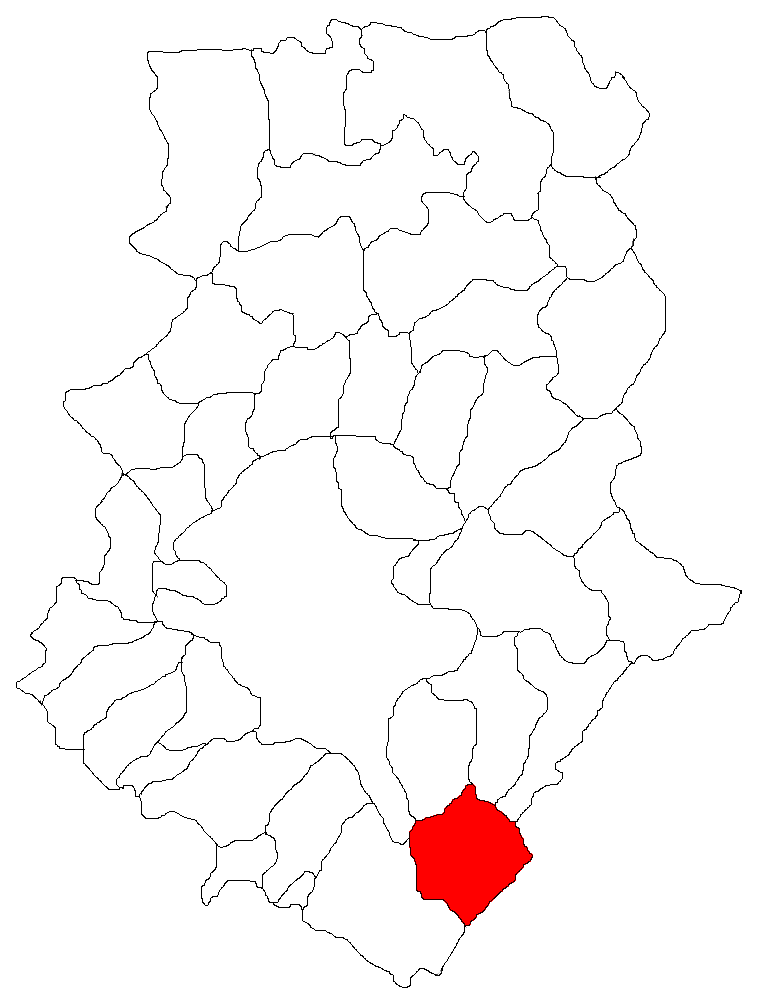
- Location in Ilfov County

- Location in Romania
- Coordinates: 44°19′N 26°11′E
- Country: Romania
- County: Ilfov

Government
  - Mayor (2024–2028): Ene George (PNL)
- Area: 24.5 km^{2} (9.5 sq mi)
- Elevation: 66 m (217 ft)
- Population (2021-12-01): 13,766
  - Density: 562/km^{2} (1,460/sq mi)
- Time zone: UTC+02:00 (EET)
  - Summer (DST): UTC+03:00 (EEST)
- Postal code: 077020
- Area code: +(40) 021
- Vehicle reg.: IF
- Website: www.primariaberceni.ro

Berceni is a commune in the southeastern part of Ilfov County, Muntenia, Romania, composed of a single village, Berceni.

The commune is located at the southern edge of Bucharest, about 15 km (9.3 mi) from the city center, to which it is connected by the Berceni Road and the DJ401 county road. On its northwestern side, the commune abuts the Berceni neighborhood of Bucharest, while on its southeastern side it abuts Giurgiu County.

From 1957 to 2016, Stadionul Berceni was the home ground for the football club ACS Berceni. In the summer of 2016, the team moved to Buftea after clashing with the local administration of Berceni.

Historical population
Year	Pop.	±%
2002	4,103	—
2011	5,942	+44.8%
2021	13,766	+131.7%
Source: Census data
