= Florin Răsdan =

Romanian footballer

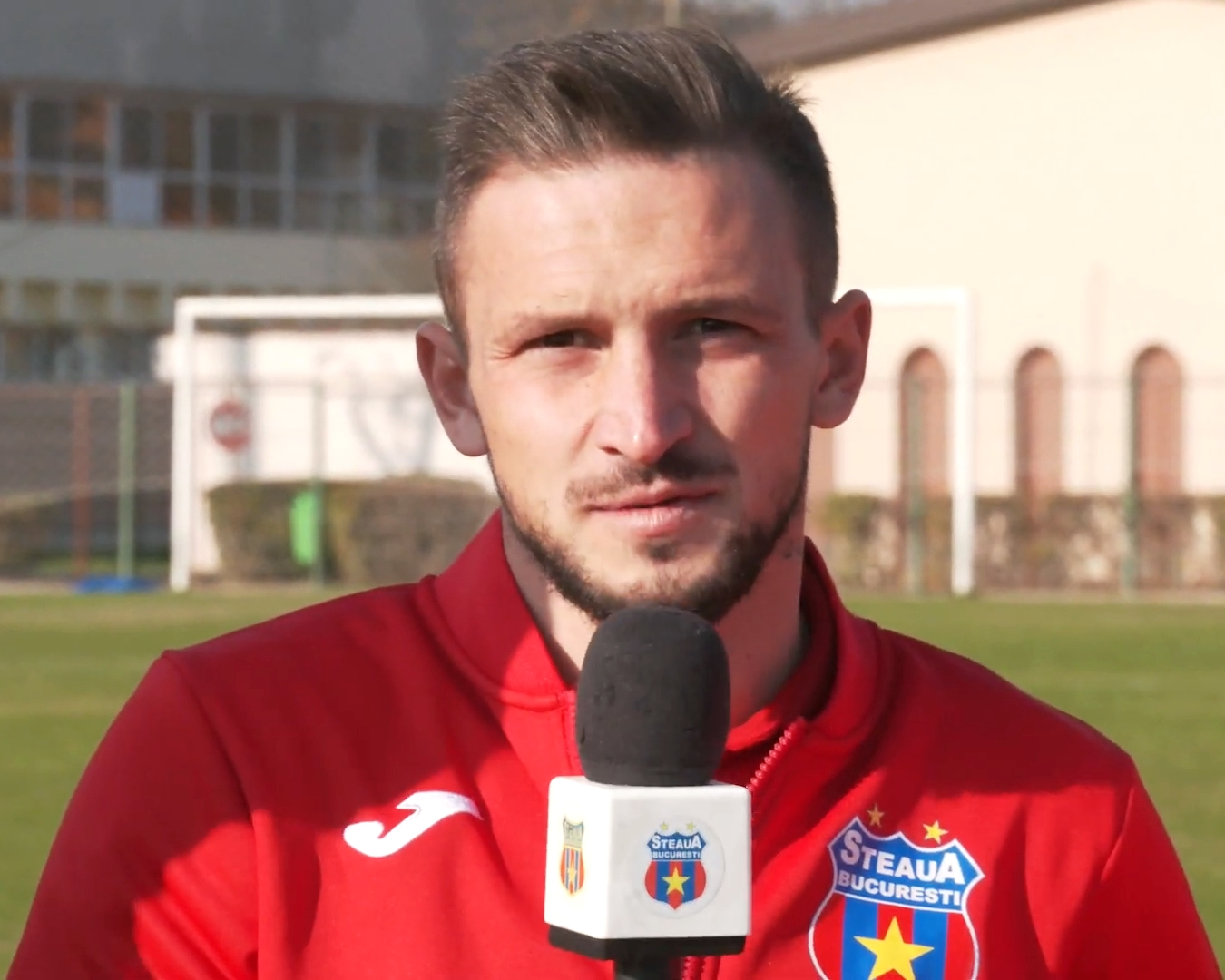
- Florin Răsdan in 2020

Personal information
- Full name: Florin Marian Răsdan
- Date of birth: 13 April 1995 (age 31)
- Place of birth: Bucharest, Romania
- Height: 1.72 m (5 ft 8 in)
- Positions: Midfielder; full-back

Team information
- Current team: CSA Steaua București
- Number: 20

Youth career
- –2014: Concordia Chiajna

Senior career*
Years	Team	Apps	(Gls)
2010–2014	Concordia II Chiajna		
2014–2018	Concordia Chiajna	17	(0)
2016	→ FC Brașov (loan)	11	(0)
2018–2022	CSA Steaua București	43	(7)
2022–2023	Viitorul Târgu Jiu	19	(2)
2023	CSM Slatina	8	(0)
2024	CSM Alexandria	6	(0)
2024–	CSA Steaua București	70	(6)

International career
2014	Romania U19	2	(0)
- * Club domestic league appearances and goals as of 30 October 2026

Florin Marian Răsdan (born 13 April 1995) is a Romanian professional footballer who plays as a midfielder for Liga II club CSA Steaua București.

== Honours ==
Concordia Chiajna

- Cupa Ligii runner-up: 2015–16

CSA Steaua București

- Liga III: 2020–21
- Liga IV – Bucharest: 2019–20
