= Ovidiu Morariu =

Romanian footballer

Personal information
- Full name: Ovidiu Ilie Morariu
- Date of birth: 18 July 1989 (age 37)
- Place of birth: Alba Iulia, Romania
- Height: 1.88 m (6 ft 2 in)
- Position: Defender

Senior career*
Years	Team	Apps	(Gls)
2011–2012	Chindia Târgoviște	22	(1)
2013	Rapid CFR Suceava	10	(0)
2013–2014	Național Sebiș		
2014–2015	Olt Slatina	12	(0)
2015–2017	Juventus București	37	(1)
2018	Chindia Târgoviște	5	(0)
2018	VFR Wenings	6	(1)
2019	Metalurgistul Cugir	9	(1)
2019–2022	Steaua București	9	(1)
- * Club domestic league appearances and goals as of 08:13, 24 June 2022 (UTC)

Ovidiu Ilie Morariu (born 18 July 1989) is a Romanian professional footballer who plays as a defender.

== Honours ==
CSA Steaua București

- Liga III: 2020–21
- Liga IV: 2019–20
