= Rareș Enceanu =

Romanian footballer

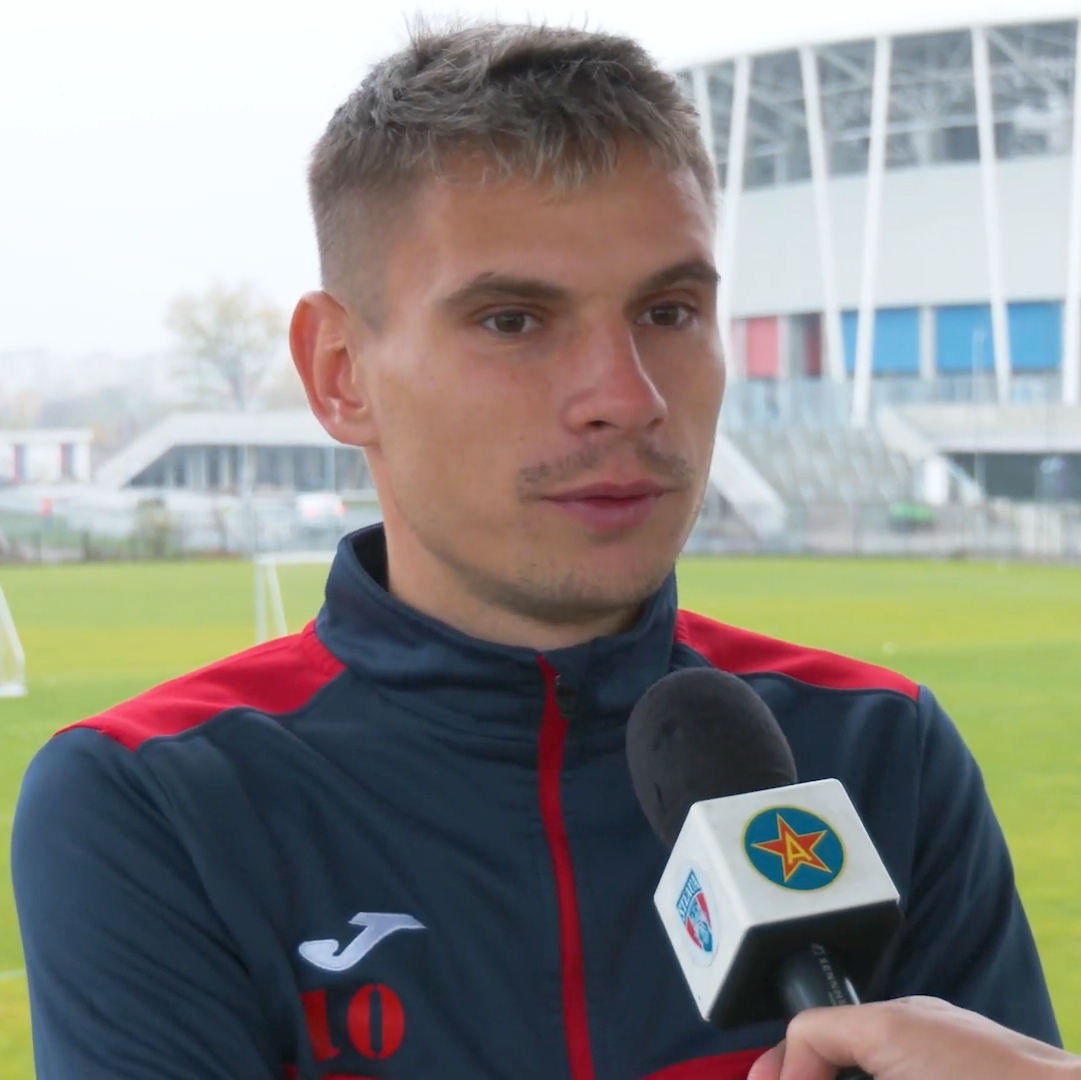
- Rareș Enceanu in 2020

Personal information
- Date of birth: 5 August 1994 (age 32)
- Place of birth: Zărnești, Romania
- Height: 1.71 m (5 ft 7 1/2 in)
- Positions: Midfielder; winger

Team information
- Current team: Bihor Oradea
- Number: 19

Youth career
- 2001–2006: Torpedo Zărnești
- 2006–2011: FC Brașov

Senior career*
Years	Team	Apps	(Gls)
2012–2015	FC Brașov	25	(2)
2013	→ Unirea Tărlungeni (loan)	13	(0)
2015–2018	FCSB	14	(0)
2016	→ Voluntari (loan)	7	(1)
2017	→ FC Brașov (loan)	11	(2)
2018–2019	Argeș Pitești	14	(9)
2019–2025	CSA Steaua București	93	(11)
2025–	Bihor Oradea	28	(1)

International career
2012	Romania U19	3	(0)
2014–2015	Romania U21	2	(0)
- * Club domestic league appearances and goals as of 16 May 2026

Rareș Enceanu (born 5 August 1994) is a Romanian professional footballer who plays as a midfielder or a winger for Liga II club Bihor Oradea.

== Club career ==
Enceanu made his Liga I debut on 23 March 2012 in a 1–0 defeat of Rapid București. He injured his thigh after opening the scoring for the Romanian under-19 team against Cyprus under-19s in April. Named in FC Brașov's starting eleven to face Dinamo București just three weeks later, he suffered a recurrence of the injury after only six minutes of the match, and did not return to training until mid-August.

== Honours ==
FCSB

- Liga I: 2014–15
- Cupa României: 2014–15
- Cupa Ligii: 2014–15

CSA Steaua București

- Liga III: 2020–21
- Liga IV – Bucharest: 2019–20
