= Marian Neagu =

Romanian footballer

Personal information
- Full name: Marian Alexandru Neagu
- Date of birth: 29 October 1991 (age 35)
- Place of birth: București, Romania
- Height: 1.73 m (5 ft 8 in)
- Position: Midfielder

Senior career*
Years	Team	Apps	(Gls)
2013–2015	Concordia Chiajna	16	(1)
2014–2015	→ Othellos Athienou (loan)	5	(0)
2015	→ Karmiotissa (loan)	11	(0)
2015–2016	Berceni	31	(7)
2016	Academica Clinceni	1	(0)
2016	Berceni	5	(0)
2017–2019	Balotești	78	(6)
2019–2021	Steaua București	2	(0)
- * Club domestic league appearances and goals as of 30 April 2021

Marian Alexandru Neagu (born 29 October 1991), simply known as Marian Neagu is a Romanian professional footballer who plays as a midfielder.

== Career ==
On 27 June 2014, he signed for Cypriot club Othellos Athienou for a one year loan deal.

== Honours ==
CSA Steaua București

- Liga III: 2020–21
