= Andrei Antohi =

Romanian footballer

Personal information
- Date of birth: 16 December 1988 (age 37)
- Place of birth: Galați, Romania
- Height: 1.80 m (5 ft 11 in)
- Positions: Attacking midfielder; forward; left midfielder

Youth career
- 1995–2003: Oțelul Galați
- 2003–2006: LPS Galați

Senior career*
Years	Team	Apps	(Gls)
2006–2007	Dunărea Galați	14	(1)
2007–2009	Jiul Petroșani	64	(18)
2010	Internaţional Curtea de Argeş	5	(0)
2010–2011	Pandurii Târgu Jiu	3	(0)
2011	→ Dunărea Galați (loan)	12	(3)
2011–2011	→ Voința Sibiu (loan)	17	(0)
2012–2015	Fortuna Poiana Câmpina	17	(3)
2015–2017	Academica Clinceni	48	(17)
2017	Sohar	11	(7)
2017–2018	Luceafărul Oradea	24	(3)
2018–2019	Oțelul Galați	14	(9)
2019–2021	Steaua București	33	(33)
- * Club domestic league appearances and goals as of 30 April 2021

Andrei Antohi (born 16 December 1988) is a Romanian football striker.

== Honours ==
CSA Steaua București

- Liga III: 2020–21
- Liga IV: 2019–20
