= Liviu Băjenaru =

Romanian footballer

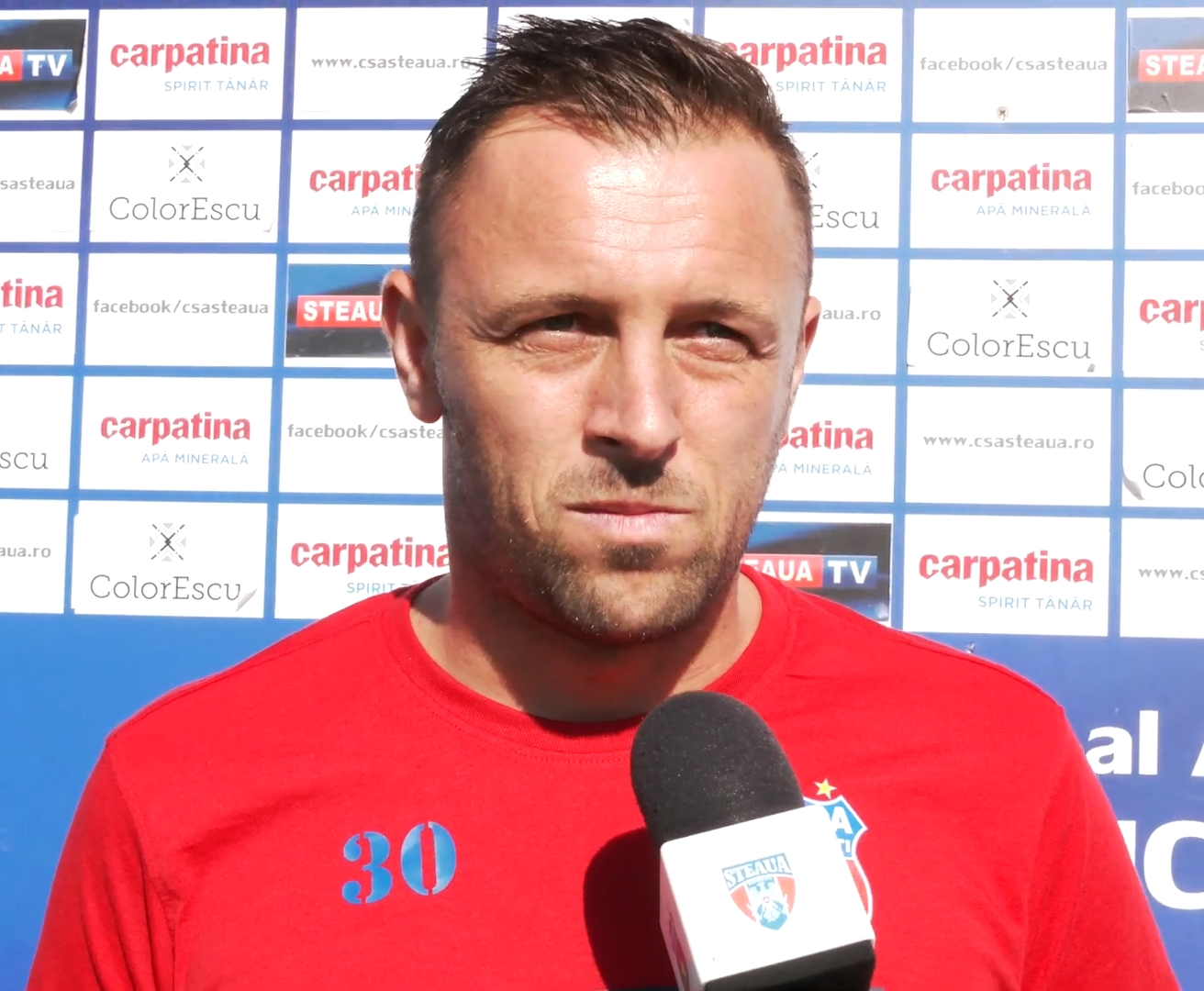
- Liviu Băjenaru in 2020

Personal information
- Full name: Liviu Dorin Băjenaru
- Date of birth: 6 May 1983 (age 43)
- Place of birth: Bucharest, Romania
- Height: 1.74 m (5 ft 9 in)
- Position: Midfielder

Youth career
- 1993–2001: Conpet Ploiești
- 2001–2002: Astra Ploiești
- 2002–2004: Dunărea Zimnicea

Senior career*
Years	Team	Apps	(Gls)
2004	Petrolul Ploiești	3	(0)
2005–2006	Conpet Ploiești		
2006	Dunărea Giurgiu	16	(2)
2007–2008	Progresul București	31	(4)
2009–2011	Gloria Bistrița	74	(5)
2011	Steaua București	1	(0)
2011–2012	Astra Ploiești	24	(0)
2012–2014	Oțelul Galați	32	(3)
2014	Concordia Chiajna	6	(0)
2015–2016	Gaz Metan Mediaș	32	(5)
2016–2018	Juventus București	58	(4)
2018–2019	Turris Turnu Măgurele	17	(4)
2019–2022	Steaua București	30	(0)
2022–2023	Focșani	10	(1)
Total		334	(28)
- * Club domestic league appearances and goals as of 10:39, 9 January 2024 (UTC)~

Liviu Dorin Băjenaru (born 6 May 1983) is a Romanian former professional footballer who played as a midfielder for clubs such as Progresul București, Gloria Bistrița, Oțelul Galați, Gaz Metan Mediaș, Juventus București or Steaua București, among others.

== Career ==
=== FCSB ===
In June 2011, Băjenaru was traded to Steaua in exchange for Laurențiu Marinescu just a few days after Universitatea Cluj bought him from Gloria Bistrița.

In August 2011 was sold to Astra Ploiești, and one year after that he signed for Oțelul Galați.

== Honours ==
Juventus București

- Liga II: 2016–17

Turris Turnu Măgurele

- Liga III: 2018–19

CSA Steaua București

- Liga III: 2020–21
- Liga IV: 2019–20
