= 2018–19 AFC Chindia Târgoviște season =

Chindia Târgoviște
2018–19 season
- Owner: Dâmbovița County Council; Târgoviște Municipality
- Chairman: Marcel Ghergu
- Manager: Viorel Moldovan
- Stadium: Eugen Popescu
- Cupa României: Fourth Round
Home colours	Away colours	Third colours

The 2018–19 season will be the 8th season of competitive football by Chindia Târgoviște, and the 4th consecutive in Liga II. Chindia Târgoviște will compete in the Liga II and in Cupa României.

== Previous season positions ==
	Competition	Position
(Romania)	Liga II	3rd
(Romania)	Cupa României	Round of 16

== First-team squad ==
Last updated on 9 January 2019

Squad No.	Name	Nationality	Position(s)	Date of birth (age)
Goalkeepers
1	Iustin Popescu	(Romania)	GK	1 September 1993 (age 33)
12	Teodor Meilă	(Romania)	GK	31 March 1993 (age 33)
25	Mihai Aioani	(Romania)	GK	7 November 1999 (age 27)
Defenders
2	Marius Martac	(Romania)	RB	6 July 1991 (age 35)
3	Adrian Ioniță	(Romania)	LB	11 March 2000 (age 26)
4	Lucian Acasandrei	(Romania)	CB	8 July 1995 (age 31)
5	Marian Vătavu (vice-captain)	(Romania)	CB	20 May 1982 (age 44)
15	Cornel Dinu	(Romania)	LB	9 June 1989 (age 37)
16	Crinel Stoica	(Romania)	LB / LM	11 August 1996 (age 30)
17	Alin Dudea	(Romania)	CB	6 June 1997 (age 29)
19	Vlad Gîsă	(Romania)	CB	10 June 1998 (age 28)
80	Denis Dumitrașcu	(Romania)	LB	27 April 1995 (age 31)
Midfielders
6	Andrei Șerban	(Romania)	LM	30 June 1995 (age 31)
7	Andreas Mihaiu	(Romania)	CM	29 September 1998 (age 28)
10	Liviu Mihai	(Romania)	LM / AM	12 March 1988 (age 38)
13	Cristian Cherchez (captain)	(Romania)	AM / CF	1 February 1991 (age 35)
14	Andrei Lungu	(Romania)	DM	29 January 1989 (age 37)
21	Daniel Novac	(Romania)	CM / RW	26 September 1987 (age 39)
45	Cosmin Atanase	(Romania)	CM	3 January 2001 (age 25)
Forwards
9	Alin Nisipeanu	(Romania)	CF / ST	13 December 1996 (age 29)
11	Daniel Florea	(Romania)	CF / ST	17 April 1988 (age 38)
20	Cristian Neguț	(Romania)	CF / ST	9 December 1995 (age 30)

== Transfers and loans ==
=== Transfers in ===
Entry date	Position	No.	Player	From club	Fee
1 July 2018	GK	1	(Romania) Iustin Popescu	(Romania) Dinamo București	Free transfer
1 July 2018	DM	8	(Romania) Bogdan Vasile	(Romania) Dunărea Călărași	Free transfer
15 July 2018	AM	7	(Romania) Alin Manea	(Romania) Universitatea Craiova	Loan
27 July 2018	CM	7	(Romania) Andreas Mihaiu	(Romania) Dinamo București	Loan
29 July 2018	CB	19	(Romania) Vlad Gîsă	(Romania) Voluntari	Loan
2 August 2018	CM / RW	21	(Romania) Daniel Novac	(Romania) Voluntari	Free transfer
16 August 2018	DM	14	(Romania) Andrei Lungu	(Israel) Hapoel Nir Ramat HaSharon	Free transfer
29 August 2018	CB	17	(Romania) Alin Dudea	(Romania) Dinamo București	Loan
6 January 2019	ST		(Romania) Mihai Neicuțescu	(Romania) Dinamo București	Loan
11 January 2019	CB		(Romania) Bogdan Șandru	(Romania) Dunărea Călărași	Free transfer
Total					€0

=== Transfers out ===
Exit date	Position	No.	Player	To club	Fee
30 June 2018	CB	45	(Romania) Denis Ciobotariu	(Romania) Dinamo București	End of loan
30 June 2018	LW	7	(Romania) Rafael Licu	(Romania) Viitorul Mihai Georgescu	End of loan
30 June 2018	CF	8	(Romania) Sergiu Jurj	(Romania) Universitatea Craiova	End of loan
30 June 2018	CF	8	(Romania) Cezar Mihalache	(Romania) Viitorul Constanța	End of loan
30 June 2018	ST	14	(Romania) Mihai Neicuțescu	(Romania) Dinamo București	End of loan
1 July 2018	CB	21	(Romania) Ovidiu Morariu	(Germany) Wenings	Free transfer
1 July 2018	CM		(Romania) Vlad Parghel	(Romania) Flacăra Moreni	Free transfer
1 July 2018	CF		(Romania) Alin Neguț	Retired	—
20 August 2018	DM	17	(Romania) Alin Pencea	(Romania) Turris-Oltul Turnu Măgurele	Free transfer
31 December 2018	AM	7	(Romania) Alin Manea	(Romania) Universitatea Craiova	End of loan
1 January 2019	CM	8	(Romania) Bogdan Vasile	Free agent	Free transfer
8 January 2019	CM	18	(Romania) Daniel Rogoveanu	(Romania) ACS Poli Timișoara	Free transfer
Total					€0

=== Loans out ===
Start date	End date	Position	No.	Player	To club	Fee
1 August 2018	30 June 2019	CB		(Romania) Robert Călin	(Romania) Pucioasa	None
1 August 2018	30 June 2019	CB		(Romania) Marian Niță	(Romania) Pucioasa	None
1 August 2018	30 June 2019	AM		(Romania) Richard Țilică	(Romania) Pucioasa	None
1 August 2018	30 June 2019	CF / ST		(Romania) Claudiu Niculăescu	(Romania) Pucioasa	None

== Pre-season and friendlies ==
Win Draw Loss

7 July 2018 Friendly	Chindia Târgoviște (Romania)	2–1	(Romania) Afumați	Buftea, Romania
11:00 UTC+3	Neguț 55'; Cherchez 67'	Report	M.Dedu 42'	Stadium: CNAF

9 July 2018 Friendly	Chindia Târgoviște (Romania)	3–1	(Romania) Daco-Getica București	Buftea, Romania
11:00 UTC+3		Report		Stadium: CNAF

11 July 2018 Friendly	Chindia Târgoviște (Romania)	3–2	(Romania) Viitorul Domnești	Buftea, Romania
11:00 UTC+3		Report		Stadium: CNAF

13 July 2018 Friendly	Chindia Târgoviște (Romania)	2–0	(Romania) Balotești	Buftea, Romania
11:00 UTC+3	L.Mihai (pen.); D.Florea	Report		Stadium: CNAF

18 July 2018 Friendly	Voluntari II (Romania)	0–3	(Romania) Chindia Târgoviște	Voluntari, Romania
18:00 UTC+3		Report	A.Manea; Cherchez; B.Vasile	Stadium: Anghel Iordănescu

21 July 2018 Friendly	Chindia Târgoviște (Romania)	2–1	(Romania) Balotești	Târgoviște, Romania
11:00 UTC+3	Cherchez 10', 14' (pen.)	Report	Goal	Stadium: Eugen Popescu

28 July 2018 Friendly	Sportul Snagov (Romania)	3–3	(Romania) Chindia Târgoviște	Buftea, Romania
11:00 UTC+3	Lică; Costache	Report	Gîsă; D.Florea	Stadium: CNAF

18 January 2019 Friendly	Unirea Bascov (Romania)	1–2	(Romania) Chindia Târgoviște	Mioveni, Romania
11:00 EET (UTC+2)		Report	A.Șerban; D.Florea	Stadium: Colibași

23 January 2019 Friendly	Balotești (Romania)	1–3	(Romania) Chindia Târgoviște	Buftea, Romania
12:00 EET (UTC+2)	Onțel	Report	C.Stoica; L.Mihai; A.Șerban	Stadium: CNAF

29 January 2019 Friendly	Rapid București (Romania)	2–0	(Romania) Chindia Târgoviște	Bucharest, Romania
12:00 EET (UTC+2)	Hlistei 59'; Goge 65'	Report		Stadium: Coresi

31 January 2019 Friendly	Voluntari (Romania)	1–1	(Romania) Chindia Târgoviște	Buftea, Romania
12:00 EET (UTC+2)	A.Bălan 76'	Report	Răuță (o.g.)	Stadium: CNAF

1 February 2019 Friendly	Daco-Getica București (Romania)	2–0	(Romania) Chindia Târgoviște	Buftea, Romania
12:00 EET (UTC+2)	Călințaru; A.Nica	Report		Stadium: CNAF

6 February 2019 Friendly	Mioveni (Romania)	1–1	(Romania) Chindia Târgoviște	Mioveni, Romania
12:00 EET (UTC+2)	R.Lazăr 54'	Report	Cherchez 38' (pen.)	Stadium: Orășenesc

9 February 2019 Friendly	Chindia Târgoviște (Romania)	1–1	(Romania) Metaloglobus București	Aninoasa, Romania
12:00 EET (UTC+2)	D.Florea 69'	Report	Ghenovici 56' (pen.)	Stadium: Comunal

15 February 2019 Friendly	Chindia Târgoviște (Romania)	4–1	(Romania) Hărman	Aninoasa, Romania
15:00 EET (UTC+2)	Neguț 25', 39'; Neicuțescu 68'; Nisipeanu 88'	Report	Vasiloi 78'	Stadium: Comunal

== Competitions ==
Win Draw Loss

=== Overview ===
Competition	First match	Last match	Starting round	Final position	Record							
Competition	First match	Last match	Starting round	Final position	Pld	W	D	L	GF	GA	GD	Win %
Liga II	5 August 2018	–	Matchday 1	–	0	0	0	0	0	0	+0	—
Cupa României	August 2018	–	Fourth Round	–	0	0	0	0	0	0	+0	—
Total					0	0	0	0	0	0	+0	—

Last updated: 13 July 2018
Source: Competitions

=== Liga II ===
The Liga II fixture list was announced on 19 July 2018.

==== League table ====
Pos	Team	Pld	W	D	L	GF	GA	GD	Pts	Promotion or relegation
1	Chindia Târgoviște (C, P)	38	27	7	4	79	33	+46	88	Promotion to Liga I
2	Academica Clinceni (P)	38	28	3	7	77	24	+53	87	Promotion to Liga I
3	Universitatea Cluj	38	25	7	6	85	26	+59	82	Qualification to promotion play-off
4	Petrolul Ploiești	38	24	5	9	77	38	+39	77	
5	Sportul Snagov	38	21	7	10	56	37	+19	70	

Source: FRF (in Romanian), Soccerway
Rules for classification: 1) Points; 2) Head-to-head points; 3) Head-to-head goal difference; 4) Head-to-head goals scored; 5) Head-to-head away goals scored; 6) Goal difference; 7) Goals scored.
(C) Champions; (P) Promoted

==== Results summary ====
Overall								Home						Away					
Pld	W	D	L	GF	GA	GD	Pts	W	D	L	GF	GA	GD	W	D	L	GF	GA	GD
38	27	7	4	79	33	+46	88	15	3	1	50	20	+30	12	4	3	29	13	+16

Last updated: 1 June 2019.

==== Position by round ====
Round	1	2	3	4	5	6	7	8	9	10	11	12	13	14	15	16	17	18	19	20	21	22	23	24	25	26	27	28	29	30	31	32	33	34	35	36	37	38
Ground	A	H	A	H	A	H	A	H	A	H	A	H	A	H	A	H	A	A	H	H	A	H	A	H	A	H	A	H	A	H	A	H	A	H	A	H	H	A
Result	W	W	W	D	L	L	D	W	W	W	W	W	W	W	W	W	D	D	D	W	L	W	W	D	W	W	L	W	W	W	D	W	W	W	W	W	W	W
Position	9	2	1	2	6	10	9	8	6	4	4	3	2	1	1	1	1	1	2	1	5	1	1	1	1	1	1	1	1	1	1	1	1	1	1	1	1	1

Updated to match(es) played on 1 June 2019. Source: frfotbal.ro
A = Away; H = Home; W = Win; D = Draw; L = Loss

==== Matches ====
Win Draw Loss

5 August 2018 1	ASU Politehnica Timișoara	0–1	Chindia Târgoviște	Timișoara
15:30 EEST (UTC+3)		Report	Cherchez 89'	Stadium: Dan Păltinișanu; Attendance: 2,000; Referee: Denis Haidiner (Hunedoara)

13 August 2018 2	Chindia Târgoviște	2–1	Universitatea Cluj	Târgoviște
18:00 EEST (UTC+3)	Cherchez 17' (pen.); L.Mihai 41'	Report	Florescu 66' (pen.)	Stadium: Eugen Popescu; Attendance: 3,500; Referee: Iulian Călin (Ștefănești)

18 August 2018 3	Aerostar Bacău	0–2	Chindia Târgoviște	Bacău
13:00 EEST (UTC+3)		Report	Cherchez 58'; Florea 90+4'	Stadium: Aerostar; Attendance: 500; Referee: Eduard Ioniță (Galați)

25 August 2018 4	Chindia Târgoviște	1–1	Argeș Pitești	Târgoviște
13:30 EEST (UTC+3)	Cherchez 50'	Report	Buhăescu 71'	Stadium: Eugen Popescu; Attendance: 2,500; Referee: Adrian Comănescu (Rm. Vâlcea)

12 September 2018 5	Petrolul Ploiești	2–0	Chindia Târgoviște	Ploiești
19:30 EEST (UTC+3)	Fl.Plămadă 27'; Arnăutu 78'	Report		Stadium: Ilie Oană; Attendance: 5,000; Referee: Andrei Antonie (Bucharest)

7 September 2018 6	Chindia Târgoviște	0–2	Mioveni	Târgoviște
17:00 EEST (UTC+3)		Report	V.Balint 18' (pen.), 65' (pen.)	Stadium: Eugen Popescu; Attendance: 1,500; Referee: Mihai Amorăriței (Câmpina)

15 September 2018 7	Daco-Getica București	2–2	Chindia Târgoviște	Bucharest
11:00 EEST (UTC+3)	Ad.Voicu 14', 48' (pen.)	Report	L.Mihai 6'; Cherchez 44'	Stadium: Colentina; Attendance: 300; Referee: Marius Chioran (Cluj-Napoca)

23 September 2018 8	Chindia Târgoviște	5–1	Farul Constanța	Târgoviște
11:00 EEST (UTC+3)	A.Șerban 5'; Dudea 27'; Cherchez 50' (pen.), 58'; Neguț 89'	Report	Diakite 19'	Stadium: Eugen Popescu; Attendance: 1,300; Referee: Cristian Georgescu (Bucharest)

29 September 2018 9	Dacia Unirea Brăila	0–1	Chindia Târgoviște	Brăila
11:00 EEST (UTC+3)		Summary	Cherchez 63'	Stadium: Municipal; Attendance: 250; Referee: Catalin Buși (Rm. Vâlcea)

6 October 2018 10	Chindia Târgoviște	4–2	Ripensia Timișoara	Târgoviște
11:00 EEST (UTC+3)	A.Șerban 1'; Neguț 53'; L.Mihai 60' (pen.); C.Stoica 84' (pen.)	Report	Cluci 4'; C.Toma 66' (pen.)	Stadium: Eugen Popescu; Attendance: 800; Referee: Florin Dan (Chirnogi)

10 October 2018 11	ACS Poli Timișoara	1–3	Chindia Târgoviște	Timișoara
15:00 EEST (UTC+3)	Stere 9'	Report	L.Mihai 63' (pen.), 89'; Neguț 65'	Stadium: Electrica; Attendance: 250; Referee: Sergiu Popa (Aiud)

14 October 2018 12	Chindia Târgoviște	4–2	UTA Arad	Târgoviște
13:00 EEST (UTC+3)	Neguț 33' 83'; Novac 40'; A.Șerban 53'	Report	Rus 12' 66'	Stadium: Eugen Popescu; Attendance: 2,000; Referee: Claudiu Marcu (Constanța)

20 October 2018 13	Academica Clinceni	0–1	Chindia Târgoviște	Clinceni
12:00 EEST (UTC+3)		Report	Cherchez 40'	Stadium: Clinceni; Attendance: 300; Referee: Adrian Cojocaru (Galați)

28 October 2018 14	Chindia Târgoviște	4–1	Sportul Snagov	Târgoviște
12:00 EEST (UTC+3)	Neguț 6', 37', 40'; Florea 49'	Report	Huiban 90'	Stadium: Eugen Popescu; Attendance: 3,000; Referee: Horia Mladinovici (Bucharest)

3 November 2018 15	Balotești	1–4	Chindia Târgoviște	Balotești
11:00 EET (UTC+2)	Neagu 40'	Report	Neguț 8' 27' 76'; L.Mihai 55'	Stadium: Central; Attendance: 200; Referee: Florin Miron (Bucharest)

10 November 2018 16	Chindia Târgoviște	2–1	Pandurii Târgu Jiu	Târgoviște
12:30 EET (UTC+2)	L.Mihai 30'; Cherchez 45+2' (pen.)	Report	Vodă 40'	Stadium: Eugen Popescu; Attendance: 1,800; Referee: Bogdan Dumitrache (Bucharest)

17 November 2018 17	Metaloglobus București	0–0	Chindia Târgoviște	Bucharest
11:00 EET (UTC+2)		Report		Stadium: Metaloglobus; Attendance: 250; Referee: Lucian Rusandu (Sfântu Gheorghe)

24 November 2018 18	Luceafărul Oradea	0–0	Chindia Târgoviște	Sânmartin
12:00 EET (UTC+2)		Report		Stadium: Luceafărul; Attendance: 100; Referee: Florin Mazilu (Satu Mare)

29 November 2018 19	Chindia Târgoviște	2–2	Energeticianul	Târgoviște
14:00 EET (UTC+2)	Florea 52'; M.Ioniță 61' (o.g.)	Report	Tudorache 34'; V.Rusu 76'	Stadium: Eugen Popescu; Attendance: 1,200; Referee: Mihai Amorăriței (Câmpina)

2 December 2018 20	Chindia Târgoviște	2–1	ASU Politehnica Timișoara	Târgoviște
14:00 EET (UTC+2)	Dudea 74' (pen.); Lungu 90'	Report	I.Plămadă 72'	Stadium: Eugen Popescu; Attendance: 800; Referee: Marius Naidin (Pitești)

7 December 2018 21	Universitatea Cluj	3–1	Chindia Târgoviște	Cluj-Napoca
19:30 EET (UTC+2)	Hațiegan 36', 90+4'; Gavra 50'	Report	A.Mihaiu 13'	Stadium: Cluj Arena; Attendance: 4,500; Referee: Andrei Antonie (Bucharest)

22 February 2019 22	Chindia Târgoviște	3–2	Aerostar Bacău	Târgoviște
14:00 EET (UTC+2)	Cristian Cherchez 27' (pen.); Cristian Neguț 62'; Andrei Șerban 81'	Report	Drugă 6'; Vraciu 50'	Stadium: Eugen Popescu; Attendance: 1,000; Referee: Eduard Ioniţă

1 March 2019 23	Argeș Pitești	0–1	Chindia Târgoviște	Pitești
17:30 EET (UTC+2)		Report	Leca 89'	Stadium: Nicolae Dobrin; Attendance: 1,500; Referee: Sorin Antonie

10 March 2019 24	Chindia Târgoviște	0–0	Petrolul Ploiești	Târgoviște
15:00 EET (UTC+2)		Report		Stadium: Eugen Popescu; Attendance: 6,600; Referee: Iulian Dima

15 March 2019 25	Mioveni	1–4	Chindia Târgoviște	Mioveni
17:30 EET (UTC+2)	Măzărache 64'	Report	Martac 25'; Cristian Cherchez 61' (pen.); Neicuțescu 82'; Florea 90+3'	Stadium: Orășenesc; Attendance: 600; Referee: Rare Vidican

24 March 2019 26	Chindia Târgoviște	4–2	Daco-Getica București	Târgoviște
15:30 EET (UTC+2)	Mihai 53'; Florea 59'; Andrei Șerban 67'; Alexandru 85' (pen.)	Report	Stănescu 13'; Philippe Nsiah 46'	Stadium: Eugen Popescu; Attendance: 4,000; Referee: Robert Avram

30 March 2019 27	Farul Constanța	1–0	Chindia Târgoviște	Constanța
14:30 EET (UTC+2)	Păun 80'	Report		Stadium: Farul; Attendance: 2,000; Referee: Florin Andrei

5 April 2019 28	Chindia Târgoviște	3–0	Dacia Unirea Brăila	Târgoviște
17:00 EEST (UTC+3)	Leca 52'; Florea 56'; Cristian Cherchez 61' (pen.)	Report		Stadium: Eugen Popescu; Attendance: 1,500; Referee: Vladimir Nagy

11 April 2019 29	Ripensia Timișoara	0–2	Chindia Târgoviște	Timișoara
17:30 EEST (UTC+3)		Report	Mihai 12'; Leca 71'	Stadium: Ciarda Roșie; Attendance: 150; Referee: Mircea Ardelean

14 April 2019 30	Chindia Târgoviște	1–0	ACS Poli Timișoara	Târgoviște
12:00 EEST (UTC+3)	Cristian Cherchez 18' (pen.)	Report		Stadium: Eugen Popescu; Attendance: 1,600; Referee: Vlad Băban

20 April 2019 31	UTA Arad	2–2	Chindia Târgoviște	Arad
13:00 EEST (UTC+3)	El Hasni 42'; Paul Copaci 65'	Report	Mihai 64'; Leca 80'	Stadium: Motorul; Attendance: 1,000; Referee: Sergiu Popa

25 April 2019 32	Chindia Târgoviște	1–0	Academica Clinceni	Târgoviște
17:00 EEST (UTC+3)	Mihai 20'	Report		Stadium: Eugen Popescu; Attendance: 4,000; Referee: Marian Barbu

6 May 2019 33	Sportul Snagov	0–1	Chindia Târgoviște	Ghermănești
18:00 EEST (UTC+3)		Report	Mihai 90+2'	Stadium: Voința; Attendance: 300; Referee: Florin Andrei

11 May 2019 34	Chindia Târgoviște	6–0	Balotești	Târgoviște
12:00 EEST (UTC+3)	Alexandru 11'; Mihai 25' 36'; Rață 40'; Cristian Cherchez 61'; Neicuțescu 89'	Report		Stadium: Eugen Popescu; Attendance: 3,000; Referee: Eduard Ioniţă

14 May 2019 35	Pandurii Târgu Jiu	0–2	Chindia Târgoviște	Târgu Jiu
16:00 EEST (UTC+3)		Report	Florea 65'; Mihai 67'	Stadium: Tudor Vladimirescu; Attendance: 200; Referee: Marius Omuț

19 May 2019 36	Chindia Târgoviște	2–1	Metaloglobus București	Târgoviște
12:00 EEST (UTC+3)	Florea 33'; Alexandru 82' (pen.)	Report	Herea 41'	Stadium: Eugen Popescu; Attendance: 4,000; Referee: Cătălin Ion Buşi

25 May 2019 37	Chindia Târgoviște	4–1	Luceafărul Oradea	Târgoviște
14:00 EEST (UTC+3)	Florea 28'; Mihai 65'; Novac 89'; Cristian Cherchez 90+1'	Report	Daniel Paraschiv 17'	Stadium: Eugen Popescu; Attendance: 5,000; Referee: Horia Mladinovici

1 June 2019 38	Energeticianul	0–2	Chindia Târgoviște	Petroșani
17:00 EEST (UTC+3)		Report	Cristian Cherchez 18'; Neicuțescu 56'	Stadium: Jiul; Attendance: 200; Referee: Dorin Voina

=== Cupa României ===
18 September 2018 Fourth Round	Flacăra Moreni	1–2	Chindia Târgoviște	Moreni
16:30 EEST (UTC+3)	Al.Roman 45'	Report	D.Florea 83', 90+6'	Stadium: Flacăra; Attendance: 1,500; Referee: Marius Naidin (Pitești)

26 September 2018 Round of 32	Chindia Târgoviște	0–1	CFR Cluj	Mioveni
21:30 EEST (UTC+3)		Report	Tambe 33'	Stadium: Orășenesc; Attendance: 1,000; Referee: Adrian Cojocaru (Galați)

== Statistics ==
=== Appearances and goals ===
As of 1 July 2018

No.	Pos	Player	Liga II		Cupa României		Total	
No.	Pos	Player	Apps	Goals	Apps	Goals	Apps	Goals

=== Squad statistics ===
	Liga II	Cupa României	Home	Away	Total Stats
Games played	0	0	0	0	0
Games won	0	0	0	0	0
Games drawn	0	0	0	0	0
Games lost	0	0	0	0	0
Goals scored	0	0	0	0	0
Goals conceded	0	0	0	0	0
Goal difference	0	0	0	0	0
Clean sheets	0	0	0	0	0
Goal by Substitute	0	0	0	0	0
Players used	–	–	–	–	–
Yellow cards	0	0	0	0	0
Red cards	0	0	0	0	0
Winning rate	0%	0%	0%	0%	0%

Last updated: 13 July 2018
Source: Competitive matches

=== Goalscorers ===
As of 24 June 2018

Rank	Position	Name	Liga II	Cupa României	Total
Total			0	0	0

=== Goal minutes ===
	1'–15'	16'–30'	31'–HT	46'–60'	61'–75'	76'–FT	Extra time	Forfeit
Goals	0	0	0	0	0	0	0	0
Percentage	0%	0%	0%	0%	0%	0%	0%	0%

Last updated: 2018 (UTC)
Source: Soccerway

=== Hat-tricks ===
Player	Against	Result	Date	Competition

=== Clean sheets ===
As of 2018

Rank	Name	Liga II	Cupa României	Total	Games played
Total		0	0	0	0

=== Disciplinary record ===
As of 2018

Rank	Position	Name	Liga II			Cupa României			Total		
Rank	Position	Name	Yellow card	(yellow card) (yellow-red card)	Red card	Yellow card	(yellow card) (yellow-red card)	Red card	Yellow card	(yellow card) (yellow-red card)	Red card
Total			0	0	0	0	0	0	0	0	0

=== Attendances ===
As of 2018

	Matches	Attendances	Average	High	Low
Liga II	0	0	0	0	0
Cupa României	0	0	0	0	0
Total	0	0	0	0	0

== See also ==
- 2018–19 Liga II
- 2018–19 Cupa României
