= 2021–22 Liga I =

104th season of top-tier football league in Romania

Liga I
- Season: 2021–22
- Dates: 15 July 2021 – 29 May 2022
- Champions: CFR Cluj
- Relegated: Gaz Metan Mediaș; Academica Clinceni; Dinamo București
- Champions League: CFR Cluj
- Europa Conference League: FCSB; Sepsi Sfântu Gheorghe; Universitatea Craiova
- Top goalscorer: Florin Tănase (20 goals)
- Biggest home win: Rapid 8–0 Gaz Metan Mediaș (18 April 2022)
- Biggest away win: Academica Clinceni 2–8 Farul Constanța (17 February 2022); Argeș Pitești 0–6 CFR Cluj (7 May 2022)
- Highest scoring: Academica Clinceni 2–8 Farul Constanța (17 February 2022)
- Longest winning run: 9 matches CFR Cluj
- Longest unbeaten run: 21 matches CFR Cluj
- Longest winless run: 17 matches Academica Clinceni
- Longest losing run: 13 matches Gaz Metan
- All statistics correct as of 27 May 2022.

The 2021–22 Liga I (also known as Casa Liga 1 for sponsorship reasons) was the 104th season of the Liga I, the top professional league for Romanian association football clubs. The season started on 15 July 2021 and ended in May 2022. It was the seventh to take place since the play-off/play-out format has been introduced, and CFR Cluj was four-time defending champion.

After the conclusion of the regular season, teams were divided according to their place to enter either the championship play-offs or the relegation play-outs.

The teams ranked 15th and 16th at the end of the play-out tournament were directly relegated, while the 13th and 14th places played a promotion/relegation play-off against 3rd and 4th places from Liga II.

== Teams ==
The league consistsed of 16 teams: 12 from the 2020–21 Liga I, two teams from the 2020–21 Liga II, and the winners of the 2020–21 promotion/relegation play-off.

Teams promoted to the Liga I

The first club to be promoted was FC U Craiova 1948, following their 0–0 draw against Miercurea Ciuc on 13 May 2021. FC U Craiova returned in the Liga I after 10 years of absence.

The second club to be promoted was Rapid București, following their 1–3 defeat against FC U Craiova on 17 May 2021. Rapid returned in the Liga I after 6 years of absence.

The third club to be promoted was Mioveni, following their 2–1 win against Hermannstadt on 2 June 2021, in the promotion/relegation play-offs. Mioveni returned in the Liga I after 9 years of absence.

Teams relegated to the Liga II

The first club to be relegated was Politehnica Iași, which were relegated on 15 May 2021 following a 0–1 defeat against Hermannstadt, ending their 7-year stay in the top flight.

The second club to be relegated was Astra Giurgiu, which were relegated on 19 May 2021 following their 0–1 defeat against Viitorul Constanța, ending their 12-year stay in the top flight.

The third club to be relegated was Hermannstadt, which were relegated on 2 June 2021 following their 1–2 defeat against Mioveni in the promotion/relegation play-offs, thus ending their 3-year stay in the top flight.

Other changes

In June 2021, Gheorghe Hagi (owner of Viitorul Constanța), chairman Gheorghe Popescu and Farul Constanța owner Ciprian Marica announced in a press conference that their two clubs have merged; second division club Farul Constanța therefore took Viitorul's place in the first league from the 2021–22 Liga I season.

=== Venues ===
FCSB	Universitatea Craiova	FC U Craiova 1948	CFR Cluj
Arena Națională	Ion Oblemenco	Ion Oblemenco	Dr. Constantin Rădulescu
Capacity: 55,634	Capacity: 30,929	Capacity: 30,929	Capacity: 23,500
Dinamo București	Argeș Pitești	Rapid București	UTA Arad
Dinamo	Nicolae Dobrin	Rapid	Francisc von Neuman
Capacity: 15,032	Capacity: 15,000	Capacity: 14,050	Capacity: 12,700
Chindia Târgoviște	2021–22 Liga I (Romania) Location of Bucharest teams.		Mioveni
Municipal (Note: Chindia Târgoviște was relocated to Municipal Stadium in Buzău, because Eugen Popescu Stadium in Târgoviște is under renovations.)	2021–22 Liga I (Romania) Location of Bucharest teams.		Orășenesc
Capacity: 12,000	2021–22 Liga I (Romania) Location of Bucharest teams.		Capacity: 10,000
Sepsi OSK Sfântu Gheorghe	2021–22 Liga I (Romania) Location of Bucharest teams.		Gaz Metan Mediaș
Sepsi	2021–22 Liga I (Romania) Location of Bucharest teams.		Gaz Metan
Capacity: 8,400	2021–22 Liga I (Romania) Location of Bucharest teams.		Capacity: 7,814
Botoșani	Voluntari	Farul Constanța	Academica Clinceni
Municipal	Anghel Iordănescu	Viitorul	Clinceni
Capacity: 7,782	Capacity: 4,600	Capacity: 4,554	Capacity: 4,500

=== Personnel and kits ===
Note: Flags indicate national team as has been defined under FIFA eligibility rules. Players and Managers may hold more than one non-FIFA nationality.

Team	Manager	Captain	Kit manufacturer	Shirt sponsor
Academica Clinceni	(Romania) Florin Stângă	(Romania) Răzvan Patriche	Joma	Consiliul Județean Ilfov
Argeș Pitești	(Romania) Andrei Prepeliță	(Romania) Ionuț Șerban	Macron	Getica 95, MozzartBet
Botoșani	(Romania) Marius Croitoru	(Albania) Enriko Papa	Erreà	Trutzi, Elsaco
CFR Cluj	(Romania) Dan Petrescu	(Romania) Mário Camora	Nike	eToro
Chindia Târgoviște	(Romania) Emil Săndoi	(Romania) Daniel Florea	Joma	–
Dinamo București	(Czech Republic) Dušan Uhrin Jr.	(Romania) Gabriel Torje	Macron	Unibet
Farul Constanța	(Romania) Gheorghe Hagi	(Romania) Ionuț Larie	Nike	OMV Petrom
FCSB	(Romania) Anton Petrea	(Romania) Florin Tănase	Nike	
FC U Craiova 1948	(Italy) Nicolò Napoli	(Romania) Dragoș Albu	Adidas	Justice for Craiova
Gaz Metan Mediaș	(Romania) Flavius Boroncoi	(Comoros) Nasser Chamed	Joma	Romgaz
Mioveni	(Romania) Alexandru Pelici	(Romania) Ionuț Burnea	Macron	Mioveni
Rapid București	(Romania) Adrian Mutu	(Romania) Cristian Săpunaru	Nike	Superbet, Aqua City
Sepsi OSK	(Italy) Cristiano Bergodi	(Romania) Bogdan Mitrea	Adidas	Diószegi, Gyermelyi
Universitatea Craiova	(Romania) Laurențiu Reghecampf	(Romania) Nicușor Bancu	Puma	Betano
UTA Arad	(Romania) Ionuț Badea	(Romania) Florin Iacob	Saller	Efbet, International Alexander Holding
Voluntari	(Romania) Liviu Ciobotariu	(Romania) Cosmin Achim	Nike	Metropola TV

=== Managerial changes ===
Team	Outgoing manager	Manner of departure	Date of vacancy	Position in table	Incoming manager	Date of appointment
FC U Craiova 1948	(Romania) Eugen Trică	Sacked	24 May 2021	Pre-season	(Romania) Adrian Mutu	2 June 2021
FCSB	(Romania) Anton Petrea	End of contract	31 May 2021	Pre-season	(Romania) Dinu Todoran	1 June 2021
CFR Cluj	(Romania) Edward Iordănescu	End of contract	31 May 2021	Pre-season	(Romania) Marius Șumudică	2 June 2021
Farul Constanța	(Romania) Ianis Zicu	End of contract	31 May 2021	Pre-season	(Romania) Gheorghe Hagi	21 June 2021
Dinamo București	(Czech Republic) Dušan Uhrin Jr.	Resigned	10 July 2021	Pre-season	(Italy) Dario Bonetti	14 July 2021
Universitatea Craiova	(Greece) Marinos Ouzounidis	Sacked	23 July 2021	4	(Romania) Laurențiu Reghecampf	26 July 2021
FCSB	(Romania) Dinu Todoran	Sacked	17 August 2021	4	(Romania) Edward Iordănescu	18 August 2021
CFR Cluj	(Romania) Marius Șumudică	Sacked	27 August 2021	1	(Romania) Dan Petrescu	31 August 2021
Gaz Metan Mediaș	(Romania) Mihai Teja	Sacked	15 September 2021	15	(Romania) Ilie Poenaru	17 September 2021
Academica Clinceni	(Romania) Ilie Poenaru	Sacked	15 September 2021	16	(Romania) Ionuț Chirilă	21 September 2021
Dinamo București	(Italy) Dario Bonetti	Sacked	14 September 2021	14	(Romania) Mircea Rednic	29 September 2021
FC U Craiova 1948	(Romania) Adrian Mutu	Sacked	4 October 2021	13	(Romania) Flavius Stoican	5 October 2021
Sepsi OSK	(Romania) Leontin Grozavu	Sacked	7 October 2021	12	(Italy) Cristiano Bergodi	8 October 2021
FC U Craiova 1948	(Romania) Flavius Stoican	Sacked	3 November 2021	12	(Romania) Eugen Trică	6 November 2021
FCSB	(Romania) Edward Iordănescu	Resigned	13 November 2021	2	(Romania) Anton Petrea	1 December 2021
Academica Clinceni	(Romania) Ionuț Chirilă	Sacked	1 December 2021	16	(Romania) Adrian Falub	6 December 2021
FC U Craiova 1948	(Romania) Eugen Trică	Sacked	4 December 2021	14	(Italy) Nicolò Napoli	11 January 2022
Dinamo București	(Romania) Mircea Rednic	Sacked	21 December 2021	15	(Romania) Flavius Stoican	22 December 2021
UTA Arad	(Romania) László Balint	Resigned	31 January 2022	10	(Romania) Ionuț Badea	31 January 2022
Academica Clinceni	(Romania) Adrian Falub	Resigned	4 February 2021	16	(Romania) Florin Stângă	15 February 2021
Gaz Metan Mediaș	(Romania) Ilie Poenaru	Resigned	17 February 2022	14	(Romania) Flavius Boroncoi	18 February 2022
Rapid Bucuresti	(Romania) Mihai Iosif	Sacked	2 March 2022	9	(Romania) Adrian Mutu	3 March 2022
Dinamo Bucuresti	(Romania) Flavius Stoican	Resigned	8 March 2022	14	(Czech Republic) Dušan Uhrin Jr.	8 March 2022

== Regular season ==
In the regular season the 16 teams will meet twice for a total of 30 matches per team, with the top 6 advancing to the Championship play-offs and the bottom 10 qualifying for the relegation play-outs.

=== Table ===
Pos	Team	Pld	W	D	L	GF	GA	GD	Pts	Qualification
1	CFR Cluj	30	24	4	2	48	16	+32	76	Qualification for the Play-off round
2	FCSB	30	18	8	4	54	28	+26	62	Qualification for the Play-off round
3	Universitatea Craiova	30	16	6	8	55	29	+26	54	Qualification for the Play-off round
4	Argeș Pitești	30	14	6	10	28	22	+6	48	Qualification for the Play-off round
5	Farul Constanța	30	14	6	10	42	21	+21	48	Qualification for the Play-off round
6	Voluntari	30	13	8	9	31	27	+4	47	Qualification for the Play-off round
7	Botoșani	30	11	13	6	33	28	+5	46	Qualification for the Play-out round
8	UTA Arad	30	9	13	8	24	20	+4	40	Qualification for the Play-out round
9	Rapid București	30	9	13	8	34	31	+3	40	Qualification for the Play-out round
10	Sepsi OSK	30	9	12	9	33	29	+4	39	Qualification for the Play-out round
11	Chindia Târgoviște	30	8	11	11	23	23	0	35	Qualification for the Play-out round
12	FC U Craiova 1948	30	8	9	13	31	35	−4	33	Qualification for the Play-out round
13	Mioveni	30	6	11	13	19	36	−17	29	Qualification for the Play-out round
14	Dinamo București	30	4	5	21	24	66	−42	17	Qualification for the Play-out round
15	Academica Clinceni	30	3	5	22	21	64	−43	14	Qualification for the Play-out round
16	Gaz Metan Mediaș (Note: Gaz Metan Mediaș were deducted 22 points due to financial reasons.)	30	6	6	18	21	46	−25	2	Qualification for the Play-out round

Source: LPF (in Romanian) Soccerway
Rules for classification: 1) Points; 2) Head-to-head points; 3) Head-to-head goal difference; 4) Head-to-head goals scored; 5) Goal difference; 6) Goals scored; 7) Play-off.

=== Results ===
Home \ Away	ACA	ARG	BOT	CHI	CFR	DIN	FAR	FCS	FCU	GAZ	MIO	RAP	SPS	UCV	UTA	VOL
Academica Clinceni		0–1	1–1	0–1	1–2	1–0	2–8	0–3	1–2	2–0	1–1	2–3	0–2	1–3	0–3	0–0
Argeș Pitești	1–0		0–1	0–0	0–1	2–1	2–1	1–0	1–0	1–2	1–0	0–1	1–1	3–2	0–1	0–0
Botoșani	2–0	1–2		0–0	1–0	4–0	0–2	0–0	1–1	2–1	0–0	0–2	1–0	2–2	2–1	1–1
Chindia Târgoviște	2–2	1–1	1–1		0–1	1–0	2–0	0–1	0–3	0–1	0–0	2–2	1–1	0–1	1–0	0–0
CFR Cluj	2–0	1–0	1–1	1–0		4–1	1–0	4–1	3–2	2–1	1–0	2–1	2–0	1–0	0–0	1–0
Dinamo București	3–1	0–2	1–2	1–0	0–3		0–2	0–3	0–0	4–0	0–1	1–1	1–3	1–6	2–2	3–2
Farul Constanța	5–0	0–1	2–0	0–1	0–2	3–0		0–1	3–2	2–0	2–1	2–0	1–0	1–0	0–0	3–0
FCSB	3–2	2–1	3–1	3–2	3–3	6–0	0–2		2–2	2–1	3–0	3–1	1–1	4–1	2–1	1–0
FC U Craiova 1948	1–2	1–0	3–2	0–0	0–2	1–0	1–1	0–1		2–0	0–0	3–2	1–1	0–2	1–1	0–2
Gaz Metan Mediaș	1–1	2–2	0–1	0–4	1–2	2–1	1–1	0–1	0–3		1–0	1–1	0–0	1–1	0–1	1–2
Mioveni	3–1	0–0	1–1	0–1	0–1	2–1	1–1	1–1	1–0	1–0		0–2	0–2	0–3	0–0	0–0
Rapid București	1–0	2–0	1–1	1–0	2–0	1–1	0–0	1–0	0–0	1–2	1–1		1–1	1–2	1–1	0–1
Sepsi OSK	2–0	0–2	1–1	0–0	0–2	4–1	1–0	0–0	2–1	2–0	1–2	2–2		3–1	0–0	1–2
Universitatea Craiova	5–0	1–0	1–2	1–0	1–1	5–0	1–0	2–3	2–0	1–0	5–2	1–0	1–1		0–0	3–0
UTA Arad	2–0	0–1	0–0	0–2	0–1	0–0	0–0	1–1	1–0	0–1	2–1	2–2	1–0	1–0		2–0
Voluntari	1–0	0–2	0–1	2–1	0–1	2–1	1–0	0–0	2–1	3–1	4–0	0–0	3–1	1–1	2–1	

Source: LPF (in Romanian)
Legend: Blue = home team win; Yellow = draw; Red = away team win.

== Play-off round ==
The top six teams from Regular season will meet twice (10 matches per team) for places in 2022–23 UEFA Champions League and 2022–23 UEFA Europa Conference League as well as deciding the league champion. Teams start the Championship round with their points from the Regular season halved, rounded upwards, and no other records carried over from the Regular season.

=== Play-off table ===
Pos	Team	Pld	W	D	L	GF	GA	GD	Pts	Qualification	CFR	FCS	UCV	VOL	FAR	ARG
1	CFR Cluj (C)	10	6	1	3	18	9	+9	57	Qualification to Champions League first qualifying round		0–1	2–1	3–1	1–0	2–0
2	FCSB	10	8	1	1	24	7	+17	56	Qualification to Europa Conference League second qualifying round	3–1		0–2	4–0	2–0	4–0
3	Universitatea Craiova (O)	10	7	0	3	22	9	+13	48	Qualification to European competition play-offs	3–2	0–1		1–0	4–1	3–0
4	Voluntari	10	3	2	5	9	14	−5	35		0–1	2–2	3–1		1–0	0–1
5	Farul Constanța	10	2	2	6	5	16	−11	32		0–0	0–4	0–3	1–1		1–0
6	Argeș Pitești	10	1	0	9	3	26	−23	27		0–6	2–3	0–4	0–1	0–2	

Source: Soccerway, FRF (in Romanian), LPF (in Romanian)
Legend: Blue = home team win; Yellow = draw; Red = away team win.
Rules for classification: 1) Points; 2) Points without rounding; 3) Head-to-head points; 4) Head-to-head goal difference; 5) Head-to-head goals scored; 6) Goal difference; 7) Goals scored; 8) Play-off (only if needed to decide champion or teams for UEFA competitions). (Note: only criteria 6 and 7 are applied to establish the classification during the competition.)
(C) Champions; (O) Play-off winners

== Play-out round ==
The bottom ten teams from the regular season meet once to contest against relegation. Teams started the play-out round with their points from the Regular season halved, rounded upwards, and no other records carried over from the Regular season. The winner of the Relegation round finish 7th in the overall season standings, the second placed team – 8th, and so on, with the last placed team in the Relegation round being 16th.

=== Play-out table ===
Pos	Team	Pld	W	D	L	GF	GA	GD	Pts	Qualification or relegation	SPS	BOT	RAP	FCU	UTA	MIO	CHI	DIN	ACA	GAZ
7	Sepsi OSK (Q)	9	7	1	1	21	4	+17	42	Qualification to Europa Conference League second qualifying round (Note: Sepsi OSK qualified for the 2022–23 UEFA Europa Conference League by winning the 2021–22 Cupa României.)					1–0	3–1	2–1		6–0	3–1
8	Botoșani	9	6	0	3	18	9	+9	41	Qualification to European competition play-offs	0–1			2–1	1–0			2–3		5–0
9	Rapid București	9	6	1	2	22	7	+15	39		1–0	3–0		2–3				3–1		8–0
10	FC U Craiova 1948	9	5	2	2	14	11	+3	34		0–5				1–0	1–1			4–0	
11	UTA Arad	9	4	1	4	10	6	+4	33				0–2			1–0	1–0		3–0	4–0
12	Mioveni	9	5	1	3	12	10	+2	31			0–2	3–2				1–0	2–0		
13	Chindia Târgoviște (O)	9	2	2	5	8	8	0	26	Qualification for the relegation play-offs		1–2	0–0	0–0				0–2		3–0
14	Dinamo București (R)	9	4	2	3	14	11	+3	23	Qualification for the relegation play-offs	0–0			1–2	1–1				5–1	
15	Academica Clinceni (Note: Academica were deducted 44 points due to financial reasons. They later dissolved and restarted under a new name called HD Clinceni 2022.) (D, R)	9	0	0	9	4	32	−28	−43	Clubs withdrew from the league		0–4	0–1			0–2	0–3			
16	Gaz Metan Mediaș (Note: Gaz Metan Mediaș were deducted 50 points due to financial reasons. They later withdrew and completed under the name of ACS Mediaș 2022.) (D, R)	9	1	0	8	6	31	−25	−46	Clubs withdrew from the league				0–2		1–2		0–1	4–3	

Source: Soccerway, FRF (in Romanian), LPF (in Romanian)
Legend: Blue = home team win; Yellow = draw; Red = away team win.
Rules for classification: 1) Points; 2) Points without rounding; 3) Points in the regular season; 4) Goal difference; 5) Goals scored; 6) Play-off (only if needed to decide teams for relegation). (Note: only criteria 4 and 5 are applied to establish the classification during the competition.)
(D) Disqualified; (O) Play-off winners; (Q) Qualified for the phase indicated; (R) Relegated

== European play-offs ==
In the semi-final, the 7th and 8th-placed teams of the Liga I typically play a one-legged match on the ground of the better placed team (7th place). However the 7th place team, Sepsi, has already qualified to the Europa Conference League as Romanian Cup winners, so the semi-final was not played. In the final, the 8th place team will play the team ranked in the last UEFA Europa Conference League spot in the play-off tournament. The winner of the final will enter the second qualifying round of the UEFA Europa Conference League.

=== European play-off final ===
27 May 2022	Universitatea Craiova	2–0	Botoșani	Craiova
EEST (UTC+3)	Koljić 26'; Ivan 90+1'			Stadium: Stadionul Ion Oblemenco; Attendance: 10.000

== Promotion/relegation play-offs ==
The 13th and 14th-placed teams of the Liga I faced the 3rd and 4th-placed teams of the Liga II.

Team 1	Agg.	Team 2	1st leg	2nd leg
Concordia Chiajna	2–2 (1–4 p)	Chindia Târgoviște	2–1	0–1
Universitatea Cluj	3–1	Dinamo București	2–0	1–1

=== First leg ===
21 May 2022	Concordia Chiajna	2–1	Chindia Târgoviște	Chiajna
15:30 EEST (UTC+3)	Voicu 58' (pen.); Pițian 68' (o.g.)		Florea 50'	Stadium: Concordia; Referee: Marcel Bîrsan (Bucharest)

21 May 2022	Universitatea Cluj	2–0	Dinamo București	Cluj
20:30 EEST (UTC+3)	Remacle 14'; Boiciuc 83'			Stadium: Cluj Arena; Attendance: 20,000; Referee: Cătălin Popa (Pitești)

=== Second leg ===
29 May 2022	Chindia Târgoviște	1–0 (4–1 p)	Concordia Chiajna	Ploiești
18:15 EEST (UTC+3)	Chamed 90+1'			Stadium: Ilie Oană Stadium; Referee: István Kovács (Carei)
	Penalties
	Iacob (penalty scored); Passaglia (penalty scored); Chunchukov (penalty scored); Celea (penalty scored)		(penalty missed) Soković; (penalty missed) Palmeș; (penalty scored) Llullaku

29 May 2022	Dinamo București	1–1	Universitatea Cluj	Bucharest
21:00 EEST (UTC+3)	Morar 19'		Tescan 17'	Stadium: Stadionul Dinamo; Attendance: 13,770; Referee: Adrian Cojocaru (Galați)

== Season statistics ==
=== Top scorers ===
As of 27 May 2022

Rank	Player	Club	Goals
1	(Romania) Florin Tănase	FCSB	20
2	(Spain) Jefté Betancor	Farul	16
3	(Croatia) Gabriel Debeljuh	CFR Cluj	14
3	(Romania) Andrei Ivan	Universitatea Craiova	14
5	(Romania) Jovan Marković	Universitatea Craiova	13
6	(Italy) Andrea Compagno	FC U Craiova 1948	12
7	(Brazil) Gustavo Vagenin	Universitatea Craiova	10
7	(Romania) Ciprian Deac	CFR Cluj	10
7	(Romania) Octavian Popescu	FCSB	10
10	(Romania) Claudiu Petrila	CFR Cluj	9
10	(Romania) Adrian Petre	Farul	9
10	(Romania) Mihai Roman	FC Botoșani	9
10	(Romania) Bogdan Rusu	Mioveni	9

=== Hat-tricks ===
Player	For	Against	Result	Date
(Romania) Deian Sorescu	Dinamo	FC Voluntari	3–2 (H)	19 July 2021
(Spain) Jefte Betancor	Farul Constanța	Academica Clinceni	5–0 (H)	13 September 2021
(Romania) Andrei Ivan	Universitatea Craiova	CS Mioveni	5–2 (H)	30 October 2021
(Croatia) Gabriel Debeljuh	CFR Cluj	Dinamo	4–1 (H)	6 March 2022
(Romania) Florin Tănase	FCSB	Farul Constanța	0–4 (A)	25 April 2022

Notes

(H) – Home team
(A) – Away team

=== Top assists ===
As of 18 May 2022

Rank	Player	Club	Assists
1	(Romania) Andrei Ivan	Universitatea Craiova	11
2	(Romania) Ciprian Deac	CFR Cluj	10
2	(Romania) Rareș Ilie	Rapid Bucuresti	10
3	(Algeria) Billel Omrani	CFR Cluj	9
3	(Romania) Darius Olaru	FCSB	9
4	(Romania) Ronaldo Deaconu	Gaz Metan Medias	7
5	(Netherlands) Bradley de Nooijer	Farul	6
5	(Romania) Dan Nistor	Universitatea Craiova	6
5	(Romania) Florin Tănase	FCSB	6
5	(Brazil) Gustavo Vagenin	CS Universitatea Craiova	6
5	(Germany) Christopher Braun	FC Botosani	6
5	(Belgium) William Baeten	FC U Craiova 1948	6
6	(Romania) Ion Gheorghe	FC Voluntari	5
6	(Romania) Alexi Pitu	Farul	5
6	(Argentina) Juan Bauza	FC U Craiova 1948	5
6	(France) Malcom Edjouma	FCSB	5

=== Clean sheets ===
As of 15 March 2022

Rank	Player	Club	Clean sheets
1	(Romania) Florin Iacob	UTA Arad	15
2	(Romania) Cătălin Căbuz	Chindia	14
3	(Italy) Mirko Pigliacelli	Universitatea Craiova	13
4	(Romania) Horațiu Moldovan	Rapid București	11
4	(Romania) Alexandru Greab	FC Arges	11
4	(Romania) Mihai Aioani	Farul Constanța	11
4	(Romania) Mihai Popa	FC Voluntari	11
8	(Romania) Eduard Pap	FC Botosani	10
8	(Romania) Otto Hindrich	CFR Cluj	10
8	(Romania) Andrei Vlad	FCSB	10

=== Gazeta Sporturilor Monthly Football Awards ===
==== Player of the Month ====
Year	Month	Player	Nationality	Pos.	Team	Ref
2021	August	Cristian Săpunaru	Romania	DF	Rapid București	
2021	September	Jefté Betancor	Spain	FW	Farul Constanța	
2021	October	Andrei Ivan	Romania	FW	Universitatea Craiova	
2021	November	Alexandru Cicâldău	Romania	MF	(Turkey) Galatasaray	
2021	December	Gabriel Tamaș	Romania	DF	FC Voluntari	
2022	February	Gustavo Vagenin	Brazil	FW	Universitatea Craiova	
2022	March	Octavian Popescu	Romania	FW	FCSB	
2022	April	Darius Olaru	Romania	MF	FCSB	
2022	May	Marius Ștefănescu	Romania	FW	Sepsi OSK	

==== Manager of the Month ====
Year	Month	Manager	Nationality	Team	Ref
2021	August	Mihai Iosif	Romania	Rapid București	
2021	September	Liviu Ciobotariu	Romania	FC Voluntari	
2021	October	Laurențiu Reghecampf	Romania	Universitatea Craiova	
2021	November	Andrei Prepeliță	Romania	FC Argeș	
2021	December	Dan Petrescu	Romania	CFR Cluj	
2022	February	Nicolò Napoli	Italy	FC U Craiova 1948	
2022	March	Răzvan Lucescu	Romania	(Greece) PAOK	
2022	April	Adrian Mutu	Romania	Rapid București	
2022	May	Cristiano Bergodi	Italy	Sepsi OSK	

== Champion squad ==
CFR Cluj

Goalkeepers: Giedrius Arlauskis (Lithuania) (2 / 0); Cristian Bălgrădean (15 / 0); Otto Hindrich (19 / 0); Karlo Letica (Croatia) (4 / 0).
Defenders: Rachid Bouhenna (Algeria) (10 / 1); Rareș Bălan (1 / 0); Andrei Burcă (30 / 2); Mário Camora (Portugal) (31 / 1); Mike Cestor (Democratic Republic of the Congo) (12 / 0); Denis Ciobotariu (6 / 0); Kristian Dimitrov (Bulgaria) (1 / 1); Cristian Manea (25 / 1); Iasmin Latovlevici (5 / 1); Daniel Graovac (Bosnia and Herzegovina) (29 / 2); Yuri Matias (Brazil) (14 / 0); Florin Ștefan (8 / 0); Mateo Sušić (Bosnia and Herzegovina) (20 / 1).
Midfielders: Nana Boateng (Ghana) (32 / 2); Mihai Bordeianu (31 / 1); Emmanuel Culio (Argentina) (8 / 1); Lovro Cvek (Croatia) (3 / 0); Alexandru Chipciu (23 / 3); Valentin Costache (21 / 3); Ciprian Deac (39 / 10); Alin Fică (1 / 0); Guessouma Fofana (Mauritania) (4 / 0); Adrian Gîdea (8 / 0); Ovidiu Hoban (4 / 0); Cătălin Itu (3 / 0); George Leață (1 / 0); Sergiu Luca (1 / 0); Anas Tahiri (Morocco) (4 / 1); Jonathan Rodríguez (Argentina) (5 / 0); Rúnar Sigurjónsson (Iceland) (12 / 3); Adrian Păun (36 / 1); Claudiu Petrila (31 / 9); Roger (Brazil) (2 / 0).
Forwards: Denis Alibec (12 / 2); Daniel Birligea (6 / 1); Sergiu Buș (4 / 0); Gabriel Debeljuh (Croatia) (36 / 14); Marko Dugandžić (Croatia) (13 / 1); Cristian Neguț (8 / 1); Billel Omrani (Algeria) (30 / 5); Hadi Sacko (Mali) (5 / 0).
(league appearances and goals listed in brackets)

Manager: Marius Șumudică / Dan Petrescu.

== Awards ==
=== Liga I Team of the Season ===

Liga I Team of the 2021–22 Season – Liga Profesionistă de Fotbal
