= 2025–26 AFC Chindia Târgoviște season =

Chindia Târgoviște
2025–26 season
- Manager: Ilie Poenaru (until 10 April); Nicolae Croitoru (caretaker, from 11 April)
- Stadium: Eugen Popescu Stadium
- Liga 2 Regular season: 3rd
- Promotion play-offs: 6th
- Barrage play-offs: Second leg
- Cupa României: Round 3
- Top goalscorer: League: Daniel Florea (10); All: Daniel Florea (11)
- Biggest win: Chindia Târgoviște 4–0 FC Bacău
- Biggest defeat: Gloria Bistrița 3–1 Chindia Târgoviște
- All statistics correct as of 16 May 2026.

The 2025–26 season is the sixteenth season in the history of Asociația Fotbal Club Chindia Târgoviște and the third consecutive season in Liga 2, the second division of Romanian football. The team participated in the Cupa României.

== Transfers ==
=== In ===
Pos.	Player	Transferred from	Fee	Date	Source
MF	(Romania) Robert Enache	(Romania) CSM Focșani	Loan	1 July 2025	
MF	(Romania) Georgian Honciu	(Romania) Metaloglobus București	Free	1 July 2025	
FW	(Ecuador) Stiven Plaza	(Romania) Oțelul Galați	Free	3 July 2025	
FW	(Romania) Alexandru Stan	(Romania) Rapid București	Loan	3 July 2025	
DF	(Romania) Răzvan Tamași	(Romania) SCM Râmnicu Vâlcea	Free	4 July 2025	
MF	(Romania) Alexandru Albu	(Romania) Botoșani	Free	17 July 2025	
MF	(Croatia) Ivan Pešić	Unattached	Free	17 July 2025	
DF	(Albania) Amir Bilali	(Azerbaijan) Sabail	Free	18 July 2025	
FW	(Greece) Konstantinos Doumtsios	(Romania) Petrolul Ploiești	Loan	22 January 2026	
MF	(Romania) Andrei Pandele	(Romania) Voluntari	Free	30 January 2026	
MF	(Ivory Coast) Kevin Doukouré	(Romania) FC Argeș Pitești	Loan	5 February 2026	

=== Out ===
Pos.	Player	Transferred to	Fee	Date	Source
MF	(Romania) Alin Cocoș	(Romania) FCV Farul U18	Loan return	30 June 2025	
MF	(Romania) Cosmin Atanase	(Romania) CS Afumați		1 July 2025	
FW	(Romania) Cătălin Cocoș	(Romania) CS Dinamo București	End of contract	1 July 2025	
MF	(Moldova) Daniel Danu	(Romania) CSM Olimpia Satu Mare	Contract terminated	1 July 2025	
MF	(Montenegro) Sergej Grubac		Contract terminated	1 July 2025	
DF	(Romania) Mihai Leca		End of contract	1 July 2025	
MF	(Romania) Luis Nițu	(Romania) Academica Bals	End of contract	1 July 2025	
DF	(Romania) Robert Răducioiu	(Romania) Colțea Brașov	End of contract	1 July 2025	
DF	(Italy) Roberto Romeo			1 July 2025	
DF	(Romania) Antonio Vlad	(Romania) Câmpulung Muscel	End of contract	1 July 2025	
MF	(Romania) Iulian Zamfir	(Romania) Universitatea II Craiova	Contract terminated	1 July 2025	
MF	(Romania) Alexandru Petre	(Romania) Flacăra Moreni	Loan	27 July 2025	
DF	(Romania) Iustin Andrei Cristea	(Romania) Flacăra Moreni	Loan	1 August 2025	
MF	(Romania) Alexandru Albu	(Romania) Unirea Slobozia	Free	1 January 2026	
DF	(Romania) Adrian Ioniță	(Romania) CS Dinamo București	Free	19 January 2026	
MF	(Romania) Robert Enache	(Romania) CS Dinamo București	Loan	21 January 2026	
MF	(Romania) Ionatan Dogănoiu	(Romania) Minaur Baia Mare	Loan	28 January 2026	

== Pre-season and friendlies ==
12 July 2025	Concordia Chiajna	1–5	Chindia Târgoviște
10:30

26 July 2025	Chindia Târgoviște	1–1	Steaua București
19:00

6 September 2025	Concordia Chiajna	0–0	Chindia Târgoviște
11:00

11 October 2025	Chindia Târgoviște	3–1	Metaloglobus București
11:00

31 January 2026	Chindia Târgoviște	4–1	ARO Muscelul Câmpulung
12:00

4 February 2026	Chindia Târgoviște	1–2	CS Afumați
12:30

6 February 2026	Chindia Târgoviște	5–2	Progresul Spartac
12:30

7 February 2026	Chindia Târgoviște	0–2	Voluntari
12:30

13 February 2026	Steaua București	1–2	Chindia Târgoviște
13:00

== Competitions ==
=== Overall record ===
Competition	First match	Last match	Starting round	Final position	Record							
Competition	First match	Last match	Starting round	Final position	Pld	W	D	L	GF	GA	GD	Win %
Liga 2 Regular season	3 August 2025	14 March 2026	Matchday 1	3rd	21	12	3	6	38	20	+18	57.14
Promotion play-offs	22 March 2026	16 May 2026	Matchday 1	6th	10	1	1	8	7	21	−14	10.00
Barrage play-offs	23 May 2026	31 May 2026	First leg		1	0	1	0	3	3	+0	0.00
Cupa României	6 August 2025		Round 2	Round 3	2	1	0	1	5	4	+1	50.00
Total					34	14	5	15	53	48	+5	41.18

Last updated: 23 May 2026
Source: Competitions

=== Liga 2 ===
==== Regular season ====
Pos	Team	Pld	W	D	L	GF	GA	GD	Pts	Qualification
1	Corvinul Hunedoara	21	16	5	0	37	13	+24	53	Qualification for Promotion play-off
2	Sepsi OSK Sfântu Gheorghe	21	13	5	3	34	18	+16	44	Qualification for Promotion play-off
3	Chindia Târgoviște	21	12	3	6	38	20	+18	39	Qualification for Promotion play-off
4	Bihor Oradea	21	12	3	6	40	24	+16	39	Qualification for Promotion play-off
5	Voluntari	21	11	6	4	30	16	+14	39	Qualification for Promotion play-off

Source: FRF (in Romanian)
Rules for classification: During Season: 1) Points, 2) Goal difference, 3) Goals scored. End of Season: 1) Points, 2) Head-to-head points, 3) Head-to-head goal difference, 4) Goal difference, 5) Goals scored

Overall								Home						Away					
Pld	W	D	L	GF	GA	GD	Pts	W	D	L	GF	GA	GD	W	D	L	GF	GA	GD
21	12	3	6	38	20	+18	39	8	0	3	25	9	+16	4	3	3	13	11	+2

Round	1	2	3	4	5	6	7	8	9	10	11	12	13	14	15	16	17	18	19	20	21
Ground	H	A	H	A	H	A	H	A	H	A	H	A	H	A	H	A	H	A	H	A	H
Result	W	L	W	W	W	D	W	D	W	L	L	D	L	L	W	W	W	W	W	W	L
Position																					

A = Away; H = Home; W = Win; D = Draw; L = Loss

3 August 2025 1	Chindia Târgoviște	3–0	Sepsi OSK
11:00

10 August 2025 2	Corvinul Hunedoara	1–0	Chindia Târgoviște
12:00

16 August 2025 3	Chindia Târgoviște	3–1	Șelimbăr
11:00

24 August 2025 4	CSM Satu Mare	2–4	Chindia Târgoviște
12:00

2 September 2025 5	Chindia Târgoviște	2–0	Dumbrăvița
19:30

13 September 2025 6	Câmpulung Muscel	1–1	Chindia Târgoviște
11:00

23 September 2025 7	Chindia Târgoviște	3–0	Steaua București
19:00

28 September 2025 8	Ceahlăul Piatra Neamț	0–0	Chindia Târgoviște
12:30

4 October 2025 9	Chindia Târgoviște	4–0	FC Bacău
11:00

18 October 2025 10	Gloria Bistrița	3–1	Chindia Târgoviște
11:00

25 October 2025 11	Chindia Târgoviște	0–2	Voluntari
13:30

1 November 2025 12	Slatina	1–1	Chindia Târgoviște
11:00

11 November 2025 13	Chindia Târgoviște	2–3	Afumați
19:30

25 November 2025 14	Politehnica Iași	1–0	Chindia Târgoviște
17:00

29 November 2025 15	Chindia Târgoviște	3–0	Tunari
11:00

5 December 2025 16	Concordia Chiajna	0–1	Chindia Târgoviște
18:15

13 December 2025 17	Chindia Târgoviște	2–0	CS Dinamo București
11:00

21 February 2026 18	Reșița	2–3	Chindia Târgoviște
11:00

1 March 2026 19	Chindia Târgoviște	1–0	Bihor Oradea
11:15

9 March 2026 20	Târgu Mureș	0–2	Chindia Târgoviște
17:00

14 March 2026 21	Chindia Târgoviște	2–3	Metalul Buzău
12:30

==== Promotion play-offs ====
Pos	Team	Pld	W	D	L	GF	GA	GD	Pts	Promotion or qualification
1	Corvinul Hunedoara (C, P)	10	5	1	4	12	7	+5	69	Promotion to Liga I
2	Sepsi OSK (P)	10	6	2	2	14	7	+7	64 (Note: Sepsi OSK is ahead of Voluntari on points from the regular season.)	Promotion to Liga I
3	Voluntari (O, P)	10	8	1	1	17	6	+11	64	Qualification for play-offs
4	Bihor Oradea (Note: Bihor Oradea was ineligible for promotion after failing to obtain the Liga I license due to the absence of registered women's youth teams (U13 and U15).)	10	3	2	5	15	20	−5	50	
5	Steaua București (Note: Steaua București was ineligible for promotion due to being owned by a governmental entity, as Liga I clubs must be privately owned.)	10	3	1	6	11	15	−4	49	
6	Chindia Târgoviște	10	1	1	8	6	20	−14	43	Qualification for play-offs

Source: FRF
Rules for classification: 1) Points; 2) Points in the regular season; 3) Head-to-head points; 4) Head-to-head goal difference; 5) Head-to-head goals scored; 6) Head-to-head away goals scored; 7) Goal difference (regular season + play off); 8) Goals scored (regular season + play off); 9) Play-off.
(C) Champions; (O) Play-off winners; (P) Promoted
Notes:

Overall								Home						Away					
Pld	W	D	L	GF	GA	GD	Pts	W	D	L	GF	GA	GD	W	D	L	GF	GA	GD
10	1	1	8	7	21	−14	4	1	0	4	4	8	−4	0	1	4	3	13	−10

Round	1	2	3	4	5	6	7	8	9	10
Ground	A	A	H	A	H	H	H	A	H	A
Result	L	L	L	L	L	L	L	L	W	D
Position										

A = Away; H = Home; W = Win; D = Draw; L = Loss

22 March 2026 1	Voluntari	5–1	Chindia Târgoviște
11:00

2 April 2026 2	Steaua București	2–0	Chindia Târgoviște
20:30

10 April 2026 3	Chindia Târgoviște	1–3	Bihor Oradea
13:30

14 April 2026 4	Corvinul Hunedoara	2–0	Chindia Târgoviște
17:00

18 April 2026 5	Chindia Târgoviște	0–1	Sepsi OSK
12:00

25 April 2026 6	Chindia Târgoviște	1–2	Voluntari
11:00

1 May 2026 7	Chindia Târgoviște	1–2	Steaua București
17:30

5 May 2026 8	Bihor Oradea	3–1	Chindia Târgoviște
17:30

9 May 2026 9	Chindia Târgoviște	1–0	Corvinul Hunedoara
13:30

16 May 2026 10	Sepsi OSK	1–1	Chindia Târgoviște
11:00

==== Barrage play-offs ====
23 May 2026 First leg	Chindia Târgoviște	3–3	Farul Constanța	Târgoviște
17:30				Stadium: Eugen Popescu Stadium; Referee: Marcel Bîrsan

31 May 2026 Second leg	Farul Constanța	1−1 (a.e.t.) (4–4 agg.) (4−2 p)	Chindia Târgoviște	Constanța
20:30

=== Cupa României ===
6 August 2025 Round 2	Flacăra Moreni	1–3	Chindia Târgoviște
17:30

13 August 2025 Round 3	CSO Băicoi	3–2 (a.e.t.)	Chindia Târgoviște
17:30

== Statistics ==
=== Goalscorers ===
Rank	Pos	Player	Liga 2	BPO	Cupa României	Total
1	FW	(Romania) Daniel Florea	10	1	0	11
2	MF	(Romania) Alexandru Albu	4	0	0	4
2	MF	(Romania) Georgian Honciu	4	0	0	4
2	MF	(Romania) Robert Necșulescu	4	0	0	4
2	MF	(Croatia) Ivan Pešić	3	1	0	4
6	FW	(Greece) Konstantinos Doumtsios	3	0	0	3
6	FW	(Ecuador) Stiven Plaza	3	0	0	3
