= Dancia =

Dancia is both a given name and a surname. Notable people with the name include:

- Dancia Penn (born 1951), British Virgin Islands politician
- Cristian Dancia (born 1980), Romanian footballer
