= List of FC Steaua București managers =

Futbol Club Steaua Bucuresti is a professional association football club based in Ghencea, Bucuresti, Romania. The first full-time manager of Steaua Bucuresti was Coloman Braun-Bogdan.

This is a chronological list of Steaua București managers, comprising all those who have held the position of manager for the first team of Steaua București. In the Liga I the club has appointed 38 managers; including pre-league managers and temporary caretakers.

The longest serving manager was Anghel Iordănescu, who was in charge from 1986 to 1990, a period of 3 years and 8 months. The most successful Steaua București manager in terms of major trophies won is Emerich Jenei, who won nine trophies.

== List of managers ==
In February 1929, Romanian's first national football league was formed. The club also competed in the Divizia A after his founding in 1947. Cupa Romaniei continued alongside Divizia A. Clubs continued to qualify for it based on their placings in the regional championships until 1940, when it became open to all teams in the top two divisions of Divizia A and selected other teams.

Name	Period	Trophies								Total
Name	Period	Domestic				International				Total
Name	Period	LI	CR	CL	SR	UCL	UCWC	UEL	USC	Total
(Romania) Coloman Braun-Bogdan	02.1948–05.1948	0	0	0	0	0	0	0	0	0
(Romania) Colea Vâlcov	08.1948–07.1949	0	1	0	0	0	0	0	0	1
(Romania) Francisc Rónay	03.1950–11.1950; 09.1953–11.1953; 03.1954–06.1954	0	1	0	0	0	0	0	0	1
(Romania) Gheorghe Popescu	03.1951–08.1953; 08.1958–07.1960; 03.1962–07.1962	4	3	0	0	0	0	0	0	7
(Romania) Ilie Savu	11.1953; 09.1954–11.1955; 1958; 08.1964–06.1967	0	3	0	0	0	0	0	0	3
(Romania) Ștefan Dobay	03.1956–11.1956	1	0	0	0	0	0	0	0	1
(Romania) Angelo Niculescu	03.1958–06.1958	0	0	0	0	0	0	0	0	0
(Romania) Ștefan Onisie	09.1960–06.1961; 08.1962–11.1963; 08.1970–06.1971	1	1	0	0	0	0	0	0	2
(Romania) Eugen Mladin	08.1961–11.1961	0	0	0	0	0	0	0	0	0
(Romania) Gheorghe Ola	03.1963–07.1964	0	0	0	0	0	0	0	0	0
(Romania) Ștefan Covaci	08.1967–07.1970	1	2	0	0	0	0	0	0	3
(Romania) Valentin Stănescu	08.1971–12.1972	0	0	0	0	0	0	0	0	0
(Romania) Gheorghe Constantin	03.1973–12.1973; 08.1978–06.1981	0	1	0	0	0	0	0	0	1
(Romania) Constantin Teașcă	03.1974–06.1975	0	0	0	0	0	0	0	0	0
(Romania) Emerich Jenei	08.1975–06.1978; 08.1983–05.1984; 10.1984–10.1986; 04.1991–12.1991; 08.1993–04.1994; 10.1998–04.2000	5	3	0	0	1	0	0	0	9
(Romania) Traian Ionescu	08.1981–12.1981	0	0	0	0	0	0	0	0	0
(Romania) Constantin Cernăianu	11.1981–07.1983	0	0	0	0	0	0	0	0	0
(Romania) Florin Halagian	09.1984–10.1984	0	0	0	0	0	0	0	0	0
(Romania) Anghel Iordănescu	10.1986–06.1990; 08.1992–06.1993	4	2	0	0	0	0	0	1	7
(Romania) Costică Ștefănescu	08.1990–12.1990	0	0	0	0	0	0	0	0	0
(Romania) Bujor Hălmăgeanu	03.1991–04.1991	0	0	0	0	0	0	0	0	0
(Romania) Victor Pițurcă	03.1992–06.1992; 08.2000–06.2002; 10.2002–06.2004; 07.2010–08.2010	1	1	0	1	0	0	0	0	3
(Romania) Dumitru Dumitriu	08.1994–06.1997; 05.2005–06.2005; 09.2015–12.2015	4	2	0	2	0	0	0	0	8
(Romania) Mihai Stoichiță	08.1997–10.1998; 09.2009–05.2010; 03.2012–05.2012	1	0	0	1	0	0	0	0	2
(Romania) Cosmin Olăroiu	08.2002–10.2002; 03.2006–05.2007	1	0	0	1	0	0	0	0	2
(Italy) Walter Zenga	08.2004–05.2005	0	0	0	0	0	0	0	0	0
(Ukraine) Oleh Protasov	08.2005–12.2005	0	0	0	0	0	0	0	0	0
(Romania) Gheorghe Hagi	07.2007–09.2007	0	0	0	0	0	0	0	0	0
(Italy) Massimo Pedrazzini	09.2007–10.2007; 06.2015–09.2015	0	0	0	0	0	0	0	0	0
(Romania) Marius Lăcătuș	10.2007–10.2008; 01.2009–05.2009; 09.2010–03.2011	0	0	0	0	0	0	0	0	0
(Romania) Dorinel Munteanu	10.2008–12.2008	0	0	0	0	0	0	0	0	0
(Italy) Cristiano Bergodi	06.2009–09.2009	0	0	0	0	0	0	0	0	0
(Romania) Ilie Dumitrescu	08.2010–09.2010	0	0	0	0	0	0	0	0	0
(Romania) Sorin Cârțu	03.2011–05.2011	0	0	0	0	0	0	0	0	0
(Romania) Gabriel Caramarin (caretaker)	05.2011	0	1	0	0	0	0	0	0	1
(Israel) Ronny Levy	06.2011–09.2011	0	0	0	0	0	0	0	0	0
(Romania) Ilie Stan	09.2011–03.2012	0	0	0	0	0	0	0	0	0
(Romania) Laurențiu Reghecampf	05.2012–05.2014; 12.2015–05.2017	2	0	1	1	0	0	0	0	4
(Romania) Constantin Gâlcă	06.2014–05.2015	1	1	1	0	0	0	0	0	3
(Romania) Nicolae Dică	06.2017–12.2018	0	0	0	0	0	0	0	0	0
(Romania) Mihai Teja	12.2018–05.2019	0	0	0	0	0	0	0	0	0
(Romania) Bogdan Andone	05.2019–08.2019	0	0	0	0	0	0	0	0	0
(Romania) Bogdan Vintila	08.2019–07.2020	0	0	0	0	0	0	0	0	0
(Romania) Anton Petrea	07.2020–07.2021	0	1	0	0	0	0	0	0	1
(Romania) Dinu Todoran	07.2021-08.2021	0	0	0	0	0	0	0	0	0
(Romania) Edward Iordanescu	08.2021-11.2021	0	0	0	0	0	0	0	0	0
(Romania) Anton Petrea	11.2021–07.2022	0	0	0	0	0	0	0	0	0
(Romania) Nicolae Dică	07.2022–11.2022	0	0	0	0	0	0	0	0	0
(Romania) Mihai Pintilii (caretaker)	11.2022	0	0	0	0	0	0	0	0	0
(Romania) Leonard Strizu	11.2022–03.2023	0	0	0	0	0	0	0	0	0
(Cyprus) Elias Charalambous	03.2023–	2	0	0	2	0	0	0	0	4
Total	1947–	28	24	2	8	1	0	0	1	62
