= Saeed Issah =

Ghanaian professional footballer

Personal information
- Full name: Seydou Saeed Issah
- Date of birth: 11 January 2000 (age 26)
- Place of birth: Accra, Ghana
- Height: 1.88 m (6 ft 2 in)
- Position: Defender

Team information
- Current team: Chindia Târgoviște
- Number: 16

Youth career
- –2019: Real Valladolid

Senior career*
Years	Team	Apps	(Gls)
2018–2019	Real Valladolid B	4	(0)
2020–2026	Hermannstadt	26	(0)
2023–2025	→ Metaloglobus București (loan)	46	(1)
2026–	Chindia Târgoviște	5	(0)
- * Club domestic league appearances and goals as of 31 October 2026

Seydou Saeed Issah (born 11 January 2000) is a Ghanaian professional footballer who plays as a defender for Liga II club Chindia Târgoviște.
