= Alin Manea =

Romanian footballer

Alin Mihai Manea
Personal information
- Full name: Alin Mihai Manea
- Date of birth: 9 January 1997 (age 29)
- Place of birth: Buzău, Romania
- Height: 1.70 m (5 ft 7 in)
- Position: Midfielder

Team information
- Current team: Academica Balș

Youth career
- Dacia Buzău
- –2014: Șoimii Buzău

Senior career*
Years	Team	Apps	(Gls)
2014	Corona Brașov	1	(0)
2014–2016	Universitatea II Craiova		
2016–2021	Universitatea Craiova	6	(0)
2017	→ Sportul Snagov (loan)	14	(2)
2018	→ Dacia Unirea Brăila (loan)	15	(1)
2018	→ Chindia Târgoviște (loan)	5	(0)
2019–2021	→ ASU Politehnica Timișoara (loan)	44	(5)
2021–2023	Gloria Buzău	18	(0)
2023–2025	Metalul Buzău	11	(1)
2025–2026	CSM Reșița	7	(0)
2026–	Academica Balș	0	(0)

International career
2013	Romania U16	2	(0)
2013–2014	Romania U17	5	(1)
2015	Romania U18	1	(0)
2016	Romania U19	4	(0)
2016	Romania U21	1	(0)
- * Club domestic league appearances and goals as of 9 May 2026

Alin Mihai Manea (Romanian pronunciation: [aˈlin miˈhaj ˈmane̯a]; born 9 January 1997) is a Romanian professional footballer who plays as a midfielder for Liga III club Academica Balș.

== Honours ==
Universitatea II Craiova

- Liga IV – Dolj County: 2014–15

Metalul Buzău

- Liga III: 2023–24
