= Alexandru Ionuț Stoica =

Romanian footballer

Alexandru Stoica
Personal information
- Full name: Alexandru Ionuț Stoica
- Date of birth: 23 January 2000 (age 26)
- Place of birth: Bucharest, Romania
- Height: 1.81 m (5 ft 11 in)
- Position: Forward

Team information
- Current team: Pucioasa
- Number: 19

Youth career
- –2016: Rapid București
- 2016–2018: Voluntari

Senior career*
Years	Team	Apps	(Gls)
2016–2023	Voluntari II	39	(3)
2018–2023	Voluntari	19	(1)
2018–2019	→ Balotești (loan)	29	(6)
2019–2020	→ Farul Constanța (loan)	19	(4)
2021–2022	→ Unirea Slobozia (loan)	10	(3)
2023	→ Afumați (loan)	1	(2)
2024	Vedița Colonești	10	(3)
2024–	Pucioasa	12	(3)

International career^{‡}
2018	Romania U-18	0	(0)
2018–2019	Romania U-19	3	(1)
- * Club domestic league appearances and goals as of 14:39, 27 December 2024 (UTC) ‡ National team caps and goals as of 14 July 2019

Alexandru Ionuț Stoica (born 23 January 2000) is a Romanian professional footballer who plays as a forward for FC Pucioasa.
