= Sergiu Luca (footballer) =

Romanian footballer

Personal information
- Full name: Sergiu Constantin Luca
- Date of birth: 21 May 2001 (age 25)
- Place of birth: Reghin, Romania
- Height: 1.81 m (5 ft 11 in)
- Position: Defensive midfielder

Team information
- Current team: Avântul Reghin (on loan from CFR II Cluj)
- Number: 4

Youth career
- 2009–2016: Avântul Reghin
- 2016–2018: Viitorul Cluj
- 2018–2020: CFR Cluj

Senior career*
Years	Team	Apps	(Gls)
2018–2021	CFR II Cluj	23	(0)
2020–2021	→ Avântul Reghin (loan)	14	(4)
2021	CFR Cluj	1	(0)
2021–	CFR II Cluj	21	(0)
2022–2023	→ Gloria Bistrița (loan)	20	(0)
2023–	→ Avântul Reghin (loan)	12	(1)
- * Club domestic league appearances and goals as of 12:50, 13 January 2024 (UTC)

Sergiu Constantin Luca (born 21 May 2001) is a Romanian professional footballer who plays as a defensive midfielder for Avântul Reghin, on loan from CFR II Cluj.

== Club career ==
Luca made his debut for CFR Cluj on 22 May 2022, in a 3–1 Liga I loss with FCSB.

== Honours ==
CFR Cluj

- Liga I: 2021–22
