= Bogdan Vasile =

Romanian footballer

Personal information
- Full name: Bogdan Adrian Vasile
- Date of birth: 2 February 1995 (age 31)
- Place of birth: Lipova, Romania
- Height: 1.78 m (5 ft 10 in)
- Position: Midfielder

Team information
- Current team: Dumbrăvița
- Number: 7

Youth career
- –2014: Gheorghe Hagi Academy
- 2013: → FCSB (loan)

Senior career*
Years	Team	Apps	(Gls)
2014–2017	Viitorul Constanța	0	(0)
2014–2015	→ Voluntari (loan)	6	(0)
2015–2016	→ Chindia Târgoviște (loan)	16	(1)
2017	→ Zimbru Chișinău (loan)	7	(0)
2017–2018	Dunărea Călărași	8	(0)
2018	Chindia Târgoviște	4	(0)
2019–2020	ASU Politehnica Timișoara	36	(0)
2021	Unirea Slobozia	10	(1)
2021	Odorheiu Secuiesc	12	(1)
2022–2023	Gloria Bistrița-Năsăud	29	(0)
2023–2024	Bihor Oradea	20	(2)
2024–2025	AFC Câmpulung Muscel	22	(0)
2025–	Dumbrăvița	36	(0)

International career
2013–2014	Romania U19	6	(0)
- * Club domestic league appearances and goals as of 31 October 2026

Bogdan Adrian Vasile (born 2 February 1995) is a Romanian professional footballer who plays as a midfielder for Liga II club Dumbrăvița.

== Honours ==
Voluntari

- Liga II: 2014–15

Dunărea Călărași

- Liga II: 2017–18

Bihor Oradea

- Liga III: 2023–24
