= Flavius Boroncoi =

Romanian footballer

Personal information
- Full name: Flavius Lucian Boroncoi
- Date of birth: 5 June 1976 (age 50)
- Place of birth: Mediaș, Romania
- Height: 1.80 m (5 ft 11 in)
- Position: Midfielder

Youth career
- Gaz Metan Mediaș

Senior career*
Years	Team	Apps	(Gls)
1999–2002	Gaz Metan Mediaș	38	(4)
2002–2003	Onești	28	(4)
2004-2005	Jiul Petroșani	19	(3)
2005–2007	Minerul Lupeni	48	(0)
2007–2008	Arieșul Turda	15	(0)
2008	Sparta Mediaș		
2009	Alro Slatina		
2009–2010	Voința Sibiu		
2011–2012	Flacăra Făget		
Total		148	(11)

Managerial career
- 2009–2010: Voința Sibiu (assistant/player)
- 2010: Pandurii Târgu Jiu (assistant)
- 2010: Unirea Alba Iulia (assistant)
- 2011: Politehnica Iași (assistant)
- 2011–2012: Flacăra Făget (assistant/player)
- 2012–2013: Sparta Mediaș (assistant)
- 2016–2018: Gaz Metan Mediaș (youth coach)
- 2018–2020: Gaz Metan Mediaș (assistant)
- 2020–2022: Gaz Metan Mediaș (team manager)
- 2022: Gaz Metan Mediaș
- 2023: Jiul Petroșani
- 2024-: Jiul Petroșani
- * Club domestic league appearances and goals as of 10:00, 28 February 2022 (UTC)

Flavius Lucian Boroncoi (born 5 June 1976) is a Romanian football manager and former player. As a player, Boroncoi grew up in Gaz Metan Mediaș Academy and made his debut in the Divizia A, during the 2000–01 season. Subsequently, he played mostly for second division clubs such as FC Onești, Jiul Petroșani, Minerul Lupeni or Arieșul Turda, among others.

As a manager, he worked as an assistant coach for several clubs, including Voința Sibiu, Pandurii Târgu Jiu, Unirea Alba Iulia or Politehnica Iași, but mostly for Gaz Metan Mediaș.

== Honours ==
Gaz Metan Mediaș

- Divizia B: 1999–2000

Voința Sibiu

- Liga III: 2009–10
