= Cristian Cherchez =

Romanian professional footballer

Personal information
- Full name: Cristian Georgian Cherchez
- Date of birth: 1 February 1991 (age 35)
- Place of birth: Târgoviște, Romania
- Height: 1.83 m (6 ft 0 in)
- Position: Forward

Team information
- Current team: Pucioasa
- Number: 91

Youth career
- –2008: FCM Târgoviște

Senior career*
Years	Team	Apps	(Gls)
2008–2010	FCM Târgoviște	33	(9)
2011–2023	Chindia Târgoviște	197	(78)
2023–2024	ACS Roberto Ziduri		
2024–2025	Valahii 1456 Targoviste		
2025–	Pucioasa		

Managerial career
- 2024–2025: Valahii 1456 Targoviste
- 2025–: Pucioasa (assistant)
- * Club domestic league appearances and goals as of 18 January 2023

Cristian Georgian Cherchez (born 1 February 1991) is a Romanian professional footballer and manager who plays as a forward for FC Pucioasa. Born in Târgoviște, Cherchez has played all of his career for local teams FCM Târgoviște and Chindia Târgoviște.

== Honours ==
Chindia Târgoviște

- Liga II: 2018–19
- Liga III: 2010–11, 2014–15
