= Aerostar Stadium =

Multi-purpose stadium in Bacău, Romania

- Interactive map of Aerostar Stadium
- Address: Str. Condorilor, nr. 9
- Location: Bacău, Romania
- Coordinates: 46°31′46.53″N 26°54′44.02″E
- Owner: Aerostar S.A.
- Operator: Aerostar Bacău
- Capacity: 1,500 seated
- Surface: Grass

Construction
- Opened: 1970

Tenant
- Aerostar Bacău (1977–present)

The Aerostar Stadium is a multi-purpose stadium in Bacău, Romania. It is currently used mostly for football matches and is the home ground of Aerostar Bacău. The stadium holds 1,500 people and is located near the airport.
