= Denis Dumitrașcu =

Romanian footballer

Personal information
- Full name: Denis Constantin Dumitrașcu
- Date of birth: 27 April 1995 (age 31)
- Place of birth: Râmnicu Vâlcea, Romania
- Height: 1.82 m (6 ft 0 in)
- Position: Defender

Team information
- Current team: Concordia Chiajna
- Number: 3

Youth career
- –2013: CSM Râmnicu Vâlcea

Senior career*
| Years | Team | Apps | (Gls) |
| 2013–2016 | CSM Râmnicu Vâlcea | 50 | (1) |
| 2017–2021 | Chindia Târgoviște | 139 | (4) |
| 2021–2022 | Argeș Pitești | 30 | (1) |
| 2022–2023 | Chindia Târgoviște | 35 | (0) |
| 2023–2024 | UTA Arad | 13 | (0) |
| 2024–2025 | Gloria Buzău | 37 | (0) |
| 2025– | Concordia Chiajna | 25 | (0) |

International career
| 2013 | Romania U18 | 1 | (0) |
| 2013–2014 | Romania U19 | 8 | (0) |
- * Club domestic league appearances and goals as of 1 November 2026

Denis Constantin Dumitrașcu (born 27 April 1995) is a Romanian professional footballer who plays as a defender for Liga II club Concordia Chiajna.

== Honours ==
Chindia Târgoviște

- Liga II: 2018–19
