= Georgian Honciu =

Romanian footballer

Personal information
- Date of birth: 24 April 1989 (age 37)
- Place of birth: Târgoviște, Romania
- Height: 1.81 m (5 ft 11 in)
- Position: Midfielder

Team information
- Current team: Chindia Târgoviște
- Number: 11

Youth career
- 2002–2005: Alpan U Târgoviște
- 2005: FCM Târgoviște
- 2006–2008: Petrolul Târgoviște

Senior career*
Years	Team	Apps	(Gls)
2008–2010	Petrolul Târgoviște		
2010–2014	Chindia Târgoviște	42	(3)
2014	Fortuna Poiana Câmpina	15	(4)
2015	Mioveni	18	(4)
2016–2017	Chindia Târgoviște	63	(27)
2018	Șirineasa	12	(3)
2018–2020	Dunărea Călărași	52	(9)
2020–2022	Argeș Pitești	38	(2)
2022	Gloria Buzău	15	(0)
2023–2025	Metaloglobus București	56	(11)
2025–	Chindia Târgoviște	40	(7)
- * Club domestic league appearances and goals as of 31 October 2026

Georgian Honciu (born 24 April 1989) is a Romanian professional footballer who plays as a midfielder for Liga II club Chindia Târgoviște, which he captains.

== Club career ==
Honciu made his Liga I debut on 22 July 2018, at 29 years old, when he played for Dunărea Călărași, club that also made its debut in the top flight, against Viitorul Constanța, scoring the only goal of the match.

== Honours ==
Șirineasa

- Liga III: 2017–18
