= Alexandru Vodă =

Romanian footballer

Personal information
- Full name: Alexandru Ionuț Vodă
- Date of birth: 22 July 1998 (age 28)
- Place of birth: Craiova, Romania
- Height: 1.76 m (5 ft 9 in)
- Position: Right-back

Youth career
- –2017: Pandurii Târgu Jiu

Senior career*
Years	Team	Apps	(Gls)
2017–2019	Pandurii Târgu Jiu	50	(2)
2019–2021	Hermannstadt	31	(1)
2021	→ 1599 Șelimbăr (loan)	10	(0)
2022	1599 Șelimbăr	0	(0)
2022–2023	FC U Craiova	0	(0)
2024	ACS Mediaș	10	(0)
2025–2026	FC Bacău	4	(0)
- * Club domestic league appearances and goals as of 13 December 2025

Alexandru Ionuț Vodă (born 22 July 1998) is a Romanian professional footballer who plays as a right-back.
