= FC Pucioasa =

Romanian football club

- Full name: Fotbal Club Pucioasa
- Nickname: Bombonarii (The Candymakers)
- Short name: Pucioasa
- Founded: 1985; 41 years ago as FC Aninoasa
- Ground: Dumitru Tică Popescu
- Capacity: 1,000
- Owner: Pucioasa Town
- Chairman: Cristian Mitrea
- Manager: Marian Vătavu
- League: Liga IV
- 2025–26: Liga III, Seria IV, 12th (relegated)
Home colours	Away colours	Third colours

Fotbal Club Pucioasa, commonly known as FC Pucioasa, or simply as Pucioasa, is Romanian football club from Pucioasa, Dâmbovița County. Until June 2018, the club was named as FC Aninoasa and played at Aninoasa. It currently plays in the Liga III.

== History ==
Former logo, as FC Aninoasa.

The club was founded in 1985 as FC Aninoasa and mostly played in the Liga IV.

The club won Liga IV – Dâmbovița County twice, in 2014 and 2015, but succeeded to promote only the second time, when they won the promotion play-off match against Unirea Bascov, Argeș County champions, 4–2 on aggregate.

After three mediocre Liga III seasons, in which occupied following places: 11th (2015–16), 12th (2016–17) and 10th (2017–18), commune of Aninoasa decided to withdraw its financial support sending the team down to dissolution. The save came from just 15 kilometers away, from the town of Pucioasa, a town of which teams were dissolved one by one, being absent from the first three leagues for years. The team was moved in the summer of 2018 and changed its name from FC Aninoasa to FC Pucioasa.

== Honours ==
=== Leagues ===
Liga III

- Winners (1): 2021–22

Liga IV – Dâmbovița County

- Winners (2): 2013–14, 2014–15

== Players ==
=== First team squad ===
As of 10 September 2024

Note: Flags indicate national team as defined under FIFA eligibility rules; some limited exceptions apply. Players may hold more than one non-FIFA nationality.

No.	Pos.	Nation	Player
2	DF	ROU	Eduard Coman (on loan from Chindia)
3	DF	ROU	Daniel Brătucu
4	MF	ROU	Costin Iordache
5	DF	ROU	Daniel Răuță
6	DF	ROU	Narcis Marina (Captain)
7	MF	ROU	Alexandru Soare
8	MF	ROU	Ionuț Cristea
9	FW	ROU	Giani Stere
10	MF	ROU	Mihai Enache (on loan from Chindia)
11	MF	ROU	Sorin Nicolae (on loan from Chindia)
13	MF	ROU	Tiberiu Calofir

No.	Pos.	Nation	Player
14	MF	ROU	Valentin Ioniță
17	DF	ROU	Ionel Diță
18	MF	ROU	Vlăduț Gagiu
19	FW	ROU	Alexandru Stoica
20	MF	ROU	Cristian Dumitru
21	MF	ROU	Mihai Pătulea
27	MF	ROU	Ionuț Avram
30	MF	ROU	Gabriel Dragnea
77	FW	ROU	Andu Paraschivescu
98	MF	ROU	Robert Croitoru
99	GK	ROU	Răzvan Ghițescu

=== Out on loan ===
Note: Flags indicate national team as defined under FIFA eligibility rules; some limited exceptions apply. Players may hold more than one non-FIFA nationality.

No. / Pos. / Nation / Player	No. / Pos. / Nation / Player

== Club officials ==
=== Board of directors ===
Role	Name
Owner	(Romania) Pucioasa Town
President	(Romania) Cristian Mitrea
General Manager	(Romania) Ion Nicolae
Sporting Director	(Romania) Adrian Mitrea
Press Officer	(Romania) Adrian Albu

=== Current technical staff ===
Role	Name
Manager	(Romania) Marian Vătavu
Assistant coach	(Romania) Cosmin Toboşaru (Romania) Cristian Cherchez (Romania) Valentin Marian
Goalkeeping coach	(Romania) Andrei Vlad

== League history ==
Season	Tier	Division	Place	Cupa României
2025–26	3	Liga III (Seria IV)	TBD	
2024–25	3	Liga III (Seria V)	8th	
2023–24	3	Liga III (Seria IV)	5th	
2022–23	3	Liga III (Seria IV)	8th	
2021–22	3	Liga III (Seria V)	2nd	
2020–21	3	Liga III (Seria VI)	6th	
2019–20	3	Liga III (Seria III)	12th	

Season	Tier	Division	Place	Cupa României
2018–19	3	Liga III (Seria III)	6th	
2017–18	3	Liga III (Seria III)	10th	
2016–17	3	Liga III (Seria III)	12th	
2015–16	3	Liga III (Seria III)	11th	
2014–15	4	Liga IV (DB)	1st (C, P)	
2013–14	4	Liga IV (DB)	1st (C)	
