= Stadionul Ciarda Roșie =

Romanian stadium

Ciarda Roșie Stadium
- Stadionul Ciarda Roșie
- Interactive map of Ciarda Roșie Stadium
- Former names: Tehnomet Stadium
- Address: Str. Recoltei, nr. 1 Timișoara; Romania
- Coordinates: 45°43′41.5″N 21°15′41.7″E
- Operator: Ripensia Timișoara
- Capacity: 1,000
- Surface: Grass

Construction
- Renovated: 2015

Tenant
- Ripensia Timișoara (2015–present)

Ciarda Roșie Stadium (Romanian: Stadionul Ciarda Roșie) is a multi-purpose stadium in Timișoara, Romania. Until 2015 the stadium was named Tehnomet, when it was taken over by Ripensia Timișoara and renamed Ciarda Roșie, after the district where it is located. It is used mostly for football matches and is the home ground of Ripensia Timișoara since 2015. Between 2019 and 2023, it hosts only Ripensia's youth teams matches. The stadium has 1,000 seats.
