= Giani Stere =

Romanian footballer

Personal information
- Full name: Giani Marian Alberto Stere
- Date of birth: 14 July 1999 (age 27)
- Place of birth: Bucharest, Romania
- Height: 1.85 m (6 ft 1 in)
- Position: Centre-forward

Team information
- Current team: Pucioasa
- Number: 9

Youth career
- –2018: Concordia Chiajna
- 2018: ACS Poli

Senior career*
| Years | Team | Apps | (Gls) |
| 2018–2019 | ACS Poli | 21 | (2) |
| 2019–2020 | Sportul Snagov | 2 | (0) |
| 2020–2021 | Deva | 18 | (1) |
| 2021 | Dinamo Bucuresti | 4 | (0) |
| 2021–2022 | Metaloglobus București | 0 | (0) |
| 2022 | Minerul Costești | 4 | (0) |
| 2023 | Recolta Gh. Doja | 10 | (1) |
| 2023 | Înainte Modelu | 12 | (2) |
| 2024– | Pucioasa | 25 | (6) |
- * Club domestic league appearances and goals as of 14:36, 27 December 2024 (UTC)

Giani Marian Alberto Stere (born 14 July 1999) is a Romanian professional footballer who plays as a centre-forward for FC Pucioasa.
