= Ionuț Andrei Șerban =

Romanian footballer

Ionuț Șerban
Personal information
- Full name: Ionuț Andrei Șerban
- Date of birth: 9 March 1992 (age 34)
- Place of birth: Craiova, Romania
- Height: 1.76 m (5 ft 9 in)
- Position: Midfielder

Team information
- Current team: ARO Câmpulung

Youth career
- –2009: Școala de Fotbal Gheorghe Popescu

Senior career*
| Years | Team | Apps | (Gls) |
| 2009–2010 | Jiul Petroșani | 6 | (0) |
| 2010 | Arieșul Turda | | |
| 2011–2013 | Chindia Târgoviște | 48 | (2) |
| 2013 | Viitorul Constanța | 9 | (0) |
| 2014 | Universitatea Craiova | 7 | (0) |
| 2014–2015 | CS Podari | | |
| 2016–2023 | Argeș Pitești | 203 | (18) |
| 2023 | Gloria Buzău | 14 | (1) |
| 2024 | Mioveni | 17 | (0) |
| 2025– | ARO Câmpulung | 0 | (0) |
- * Club domestic league appearances and goals as of 9 November 2024

Ionuț Andrei Șerban (born 9 March 1992) is a Romanian professional footballer who plays as a midfielder for Liga III club ARO Câmpulung.

== Honours ==
Chindia Târgoviște

- Liga III: 2010–11

Universitatea Craiova

- Liga II: 2013–14

SCM Pitești

- Liga III: 2016–17
