= Liviu Ionuț Mihai =

Romanian footballer

Liviu Mihai
Personal information
- Full name: Liviu Ionuț Mihai
- Date of birth: 12 March 1988 (age 38)
- Place of birth: Târgoviște, Romania
- Height: 1.71 m (5 ft 7 in)
- Position: Midfielder

Youth career
- –2004: FCM Târgoviște
- 2004–2006: Farul Constanța

Senior career*
Years	Team	Apps	(Gls)
2006–2010	Farul Constanța	3	(0)
2008	→ FC Ploiești (loan)	17	(3)
2010	→ Petrolul Ploiești (loan)	13	(2)
2011	Petrolul Ploiești	6	(0)
2011–2012	CS Ștefănești	?	(?)
2012–2013	Unirea Slobozia	38	(12)
2014–2015	CSMS Iași	21	(8)
2015–2020	Chindia Târgoviște	151	(32)
2020	Turris Turnu Măgurele	13	(1)
2021	Farul Constanța	10	(1)
2021	Unirea Constanța	4	(0)
2021–2022	Metaloglobus București	16	(0)
2022	SCM Zalău	10	(0)
- * Club domestic league appearances and goals as of 11:33, 20 December 2022 (UTC)

Liviu Ionuț Mihai (born 12 March 1988) is a Romanian professional footballer who plays as a midfielder.

== Honours ==
Petrolul Ploiești

- Liga II: 2010–11

CSMS Iași

- Liga II: 2013–14

Chindia Târgoviște

- Liga II: 2018–19
