= Mihai Neicuțescu =

Romanian footballer

Personal information
- Full name: Mihai Alexandru Neicuțescu
- Date of birth: 29 September 1998 (age 28)
- Place of birth: Bucharest, Romania
- Height: 1.81 m (5 ft 11 in)
- Position: Forward

Team information
- Current team: Popești-Leordeni
- Number: 29

Youth career
- Team București
- –2017: Dinamo București

Senior career*
Years	Team	Apps	(Gls)
2017–2022	Dinamo București	22	(0)
2017–2018	→ Chindia Târgoviște (loan)	20	(4)
2019	→ Chindia Târgoviște (loan)	16	(5)
2020–2021	→ Chindia Târgoviște (loan)	12	(0)
2022	Gloria Buzău	15	(1)
2023–2024	Ceahlăul Piatra Neamț	38	(5)
2024–2026	Concordia Chiajna	46	(7)
2026–	Popești-Leordeni	12	(2)

International career
2019	Romania U21	1	(0)
- * Club domestic league appearances and goals as of 31 October 2026

Mihai Alexandru Neicuțescu (born 29 September 1998) is a Romanian professional footballer who plays as a forward for Liga II club Popești-Leordeni.

== Honours ==
Chindia Târgoviște

- Liga II: 2018–19
