= Cristian Dancia =

Romanian former football player

Cristian Ioan Dancia
Personal information
- Date of birth: 5 February 1980 (age 46)
- Place of birth: Lugoj, Romania
- Height: 1.77 m (5 ft 9 1/2 in)
- Position: Defender

Senior career*
Years	Team	Apps	(Gls)
1998–2000	Politehnica Timişoara	48	(0)
2000–2004	Argeș Pitești	103	(0)
2004–2006	Torpedo Moscow	48	(0)
2007–2008	Politehnica Timişoara	14	(0)
2008	Universitatea Cluj	10	(0)
2008–2010	Otopeni	0	(0)
2010–2011	Chindia Târgoviște	?	(?)
2011–2015	Millenium Giarmata	?	(?)
2015–2017	ACS Dumbrăvița	?	(?)
Total		223	(0)

International career
2000–2004	Romania	5	(0)
- * Club domestic league appearances and goals

Cristian Ioan Dancia (born 5 February 1980) is a Romanian former football player. He was a left defender.

Dancia joined the Turkish club Galatasaray at the beginning of the 2002–2003 season for a trial. He played two friendly games, but Fatih Terim decided not to keep him, and he returned to Romania with his manager, Ioan Becali.
