= Leontin Grozavu =

Romanian footballer and manager

Leo Grozavu
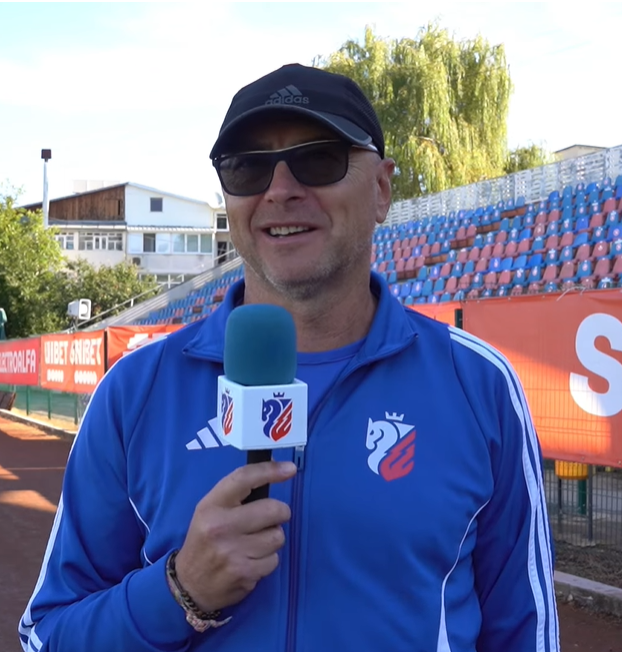
- Grozavu in 2025

Personal information
- Full name: Leo Florian Grozavu
- Date of birth: 19 August 1967 (age 59)
- Place of birth: Ilișești, Romania
- Height: 1.86 m (6 ft 1 in)
- Position: Defender

Team information
- Current team: Chindia Târgoviște (head coach)

Youth career
- 1979–1985: CSȘ Bacău
- 1985–1988: Relonul Săvinești

Senior career*
Years	Team	Apps	(Gls)
1988–1992	Maramureș Baia Mare	61	(9)
1992–1998	Dinamo București	105	(5)
1998–2000	Ceahlăul Piatra Neamț	50	(14)
2000–2002	1. FC Saarbrücken	22	(1)
2002–2003	Ceahlăul Piatra Neamț	3	(1)
Total		241	(30)

International career
1994	Romania	2	(0)

Managerial career
- 2003–2005: Armătura Zalău
- 2005–2006: Universitatea Cluj
- 2007: FC Baia Mare
- 2007–2008: Botoșani
- 2008–2009: Vaslui (assistant)
- 2010–2011: Gheorghe Hagi Academy U15
- 2012: Luceafărul Oradea
- 2014–2015: Botoșani
- 2015–2016: Gaz Metan Mediaș
- 2016–2017: Botoșani
- 2018: ACS Poli Timișoara
- 2018: Petrolul Ploiești
- 2019–2021: Sepsi OSK
- 2022–2024: Politehnica Iași
- 2025–2026: Botoșani
- 2026–: Chindia Târgoviște
- * Club domestic league appearances and goals

Leo Florian Grozavu (born 19 August 1967)is a Romanian professional football manager and former player, currently in charge of Liga II club Chindia Târgoviște.

== Playing career ==
Grozavu played professionally football with FC Baia Mare, Dinamo Bucharest, Ceahlăul Piatra-Neamţ, and abroad for 1. FC Saarbrücken in Germany between 2000 and 2002.

He made two appearances for the Romania national team during 1994.

== Coaching career ==
After retiring Grozavu became a coach, and was in charge at Armătura Zalău (2003–2005), U Cluj (2005–2006), FC Baia Mare (2007), FC Botoşani (2007–2008) and FC Vaslui (2009) as assistant manager for Viorel Moldovan. He also worked for Gheorghe Hagi's football academy together with Doru Carali.

== Playing statistics ==
Romania
Year	Apps	Goals
1994	2	0
Total	2	0

== Honours ==
Sepsi OSK

- Cupa României runner-up: 2019–20

Politehnica Iași

- Liga II: 2022–23
