= Marian Vătavu =

Romanian footballer

Personal information
- Date of birth: 20 May 1982 (age 44)
- Place of birth: Târgoviște, Romania
- Height: 1.87 m (6 ft 2 in)
- Position: Centre back

Team information
- Current team: Pucioasa (head coach)

Youth career
- –1996: CSȘ Nucet
- 1996–2000: Dinamo București

Senior career*
| Years | Team | Apps | (Gls) |
| 2000–2005 | Dinamo București | 19 | (0) |
| 2000–2001 | → Poiana Câmpina (loan) | 41 | (1) |
| 2002 | → Farul Constanța (loan) | 1 | (0) |
| 2003–2004 | → Universitatea Cluj (loan) | 20 | (0) |
| 2005–2006 | Unirea Urziceni | 54 | (1) |
| 2006–2007 | Pandurii Târgu Jiu | 29 | (0) |
| 2008–2009 | CSM Râmnicu Vâlcea | 15 | (0) |
| 2009–2011 | Otopeni | 44 | (0) |
| 2011 | CSMS Iași | 3 | (0) |
| 2012–2013 | Otopeni | 29 | (1) |
| 2013–2019 | Chindia Târgoviște | 99 | (4) |
| Total | | 354 | (7) |

International career
| 2000 | Romania U19 | 1 | (0) |
| 2001–2002 | Romania U21 | 2 | (0) |

Managerial career
- 2019–2024: Chindia Târgoviște U17
- 2024: Urban Titu
- 2024–2025: Chindia Târgoviște
- 2025–: Pucioasa
- * Club domestic league appearances and goals

Marian Vătavu (born 20 May 1982) is a Romanian professional football manager and former player, currently in charge of Liga III club Pucioasa.

== Club career ==
=== Dinamo București ===
Being a youth product of the Dinamo București, Vătavu enjoyed brief windows of playing time at the Bucharest squad, usually being loaned to Liga II clubs like Poiana Câmpina, Farul Constanţa or Universitatea Cluj.

After he left Dinamo, he usually had brief spells at Unirea Urziceni, Pandurii Târgu Jiu, CSM Râmnicu Vâlcea and CS Otopeni.

=== Politehnica Iași ===
In the summer of 2011 he joined Liga II side Politehnica Iași. He was released half a year later.

== Honours ==
=== Player ===
Dinamo București

- Divizia A: 1999–2000
- Cupa României: 1999–2000
- Supercupa României runner-up: 2001

Chindia Târgoviște

- Liga II: 2018–19
- Liga III: 2014–15

=== Coach ===
Urban Titu

- Liga IV – Dâmbovița County: 2023–24
