= Kevin Doukouré =

Ivorian footballer

Personal information
- Full name: Kevin Doukouré Grobry
- Date of birth: 30 March 1999 (age 27)
- Place of birth: Séguéla, Ivory Coast
- Height: 1.78 m (5 ft 10 in)
- Position: Central midfielder

Team information
- Current team: Chindia Târgoviște
- Number: 17

Youth career
- Djékanou

Senior career*
Years	Team	Apps	(Gls)
–2020	Djékanou		
2020–2022	Tabor Sežana	70	(1)
2022–2023	Farul Constanța	28	(1)
2023–2024	Universitatea Cluj	28	(0)
2024–2026	Argeș Pitești	26	(0)
2026–	Chindia Târgoviște	20	(1)
- * Club domestic league appearances and goals as of 31 October 2026

Kevin Doukouré Grobry (born 30 March 1999) is an Ivorian professional footballer who plays as a central midfielder for Liga II club Chindia Târgoviște.

== Club career ==
Doukouré joined Romanian Liga I team Farul Constanța in the summer of 2022. Doukouré made his debut for Farul Constanța on 17 July 2022, in a 2–1 Liga I win to FC U Craiova 1948.

Doukouré joined Universitatea Cluj on 31 August 2023.

Doukouré joined Argeș Pitești on 11 June 2024.

== Honours ==
=== Club ===
Farul Constanța

- Liga I: 2022–23
- Supercupa României runner-up: 2023

Argeș Pitești

- Liga II: 2024–25
