= Anton Petrea =

Romanian association football manager and former player

Personal information
- Date of birth: 9 March 1975 (age 51)
- Place of birth: Brăila, Romania
- Height: 1.80 m (5 ft 11 in)
- Position: Defender

Senior career*
Years	Team	Apps	(Gls)
–1996	Juventus București		
1996–1998	Venus București		
2000–2003	Venus București		
2003–2004	Juventus București		
2004–2011	Snagov		

Managerial career
- 2011: FC Snagov (assistant)
- 2011–2012: Concordia Chiajna (assistant)
- 2012–2014: Steaua București (assistant)
- 2014–2015: Al-Hilal (assistant)
- 2015: Litex Lovech (assistant)
- 2015–2017: Steaua București (assistant)
- 2017–2018: Al Wahda (assistant)
- 2019–2020: Al-Wasl (assistant)
- 2020–2021: FCSB
- 2021–2022: FCSB
- 2022–2023: Chindia Târgoviște
- 2023: Universitatea Cluj
- 2023–2024: Al-Tai (assistant)
- 2025: Daco-Getica București (technical director)
- 2025: Universitatea Craiova (assistant)
- * Club domestic league appearances and goals

Anton "Toni" Petrea (born 9 March 1975) is a Romanian professional football manager and former player.

== Coaching career ==
=== FCSB ===
On 15 July 2020, Petrea was appointed as the new head coach of Liga I side FCSB. He left the club on 25 May 2021.

On 15 November 2021, he returned to FCSB. On 25 July 2022, he resigned from his post.

=== Chindia Târgoviște ===
On 21 September 2022, it was announced he would manage another Liga I club Chindia Târgoviște.

== Career statistics ==
=== Managerial statistics ===
As of match played 21 August 2023.

Team	From	To	Record							
Team	From	To	G	W	D	L	GF	GA	GD	Win %
(Romania) FCSB	15 July 2020	25 May 2021	48	26	10	12	81	47	+34	54.17
(Romania) FCSB	15 November 2021	25 July 2022	28	17	6	5	53	27	+26	60.71
(Romania) Chindia Târgoviște	21 September 2022	8 June 2023	33	10	10	13	33	43	−10	30.30
(Romania) Universitatea Cluj	9 June 2023	24 August 2023	6	1	3	2	10	13	−3	16.67
Total			115	54	29	32	177	130	+47	46.96

== Honours ==
=== Player ===
Snagov

- Liga III: 2005–06, 2007–08

=== Coach ===
FCSB

- Cupa României: 2019–20
- Supercupa României runner-up: 2020
