= Ilie Poenaru =

Romanian footballer and manager

Personal information
- Date of birth: 11 November 1976 (age 49)
- Place of birth: Bucharest, Romania
- Height: 1.70 m (5 ft 7 in)
- Position: Left-back

Team information
- Current team: Unirea Slobozia (head coach)

Youth career
- –1996: Steaua București

Senior career*
Years	Team	Apps	(Gls)
1996–1997	Steaua București	0	(0)
1997–1998	Metalul Plopeni	32	(2)
1998–2002	Fulgerul Bragadiru	90	(2)
1998–1999	→ Gloria Buzău (loan)	13	(1)
2002–2005	Politehnica Timișoara	55	(3)
2005–2010	Argeș Pitești	99	(1)
2010–2011	Concordia Chiajna	10	(0)
Total		299	(9)

Managerial career
- 2012–2013: Inter Clinceni
- 2014–2015: Voluntari
- 2015: Voluntari (assistant)
- 2017: Dinamo București U19
- 2018–2021: Academica Clinceni
- 2021–2022: Gaz Metan Mediaș
- 2022: UTA Arad
- 2023–2024: Voluntari
- 2024: Concordia Chiajna
- 2025–2026: Chindia Târgoviște
- 2026–: Unirea Slobozia
- * Club domestic league appearances and goals

Ilie Poenaru (born 11 November 1976) is a Romanian professional football manager and former player, currently in charge of Liga II club Unirea Slobozia.

== Club career ==
Poenaru started his professional career at Steaua București, but he did not appear in an official game for the club. Poenaru made his Liga I debut on 19 February 2002, for Politehnica Timișoara, in a 1–3 defeat against Farul Constanța. In his career Ilie played mostly for Politehnica Timișoara and Argeș Pitești with short periods spent at Metalul Plopeni, FC Gloria Buzău and Concordia Chiajna.

== Managerial career ==
After retirement, Poenaru started his football manager career and coached teams such as: Inter Clinceni, Voluntari or Dinamo București U-19. In January 2018, he was appointed as manager of Liga II club Academica Clinceni.

== Honours ==
=== Player ===
Fulgerul Bragadiru

- Divizia B: 2001–02
- Divizia C: 1999–2000

Argeș Pitești

- Liga II: 2007–08

=== Coach ===
Voluntari

- Liga II: 2014–15
