= Eugen Popescu Stadium =

Multi-use stadium

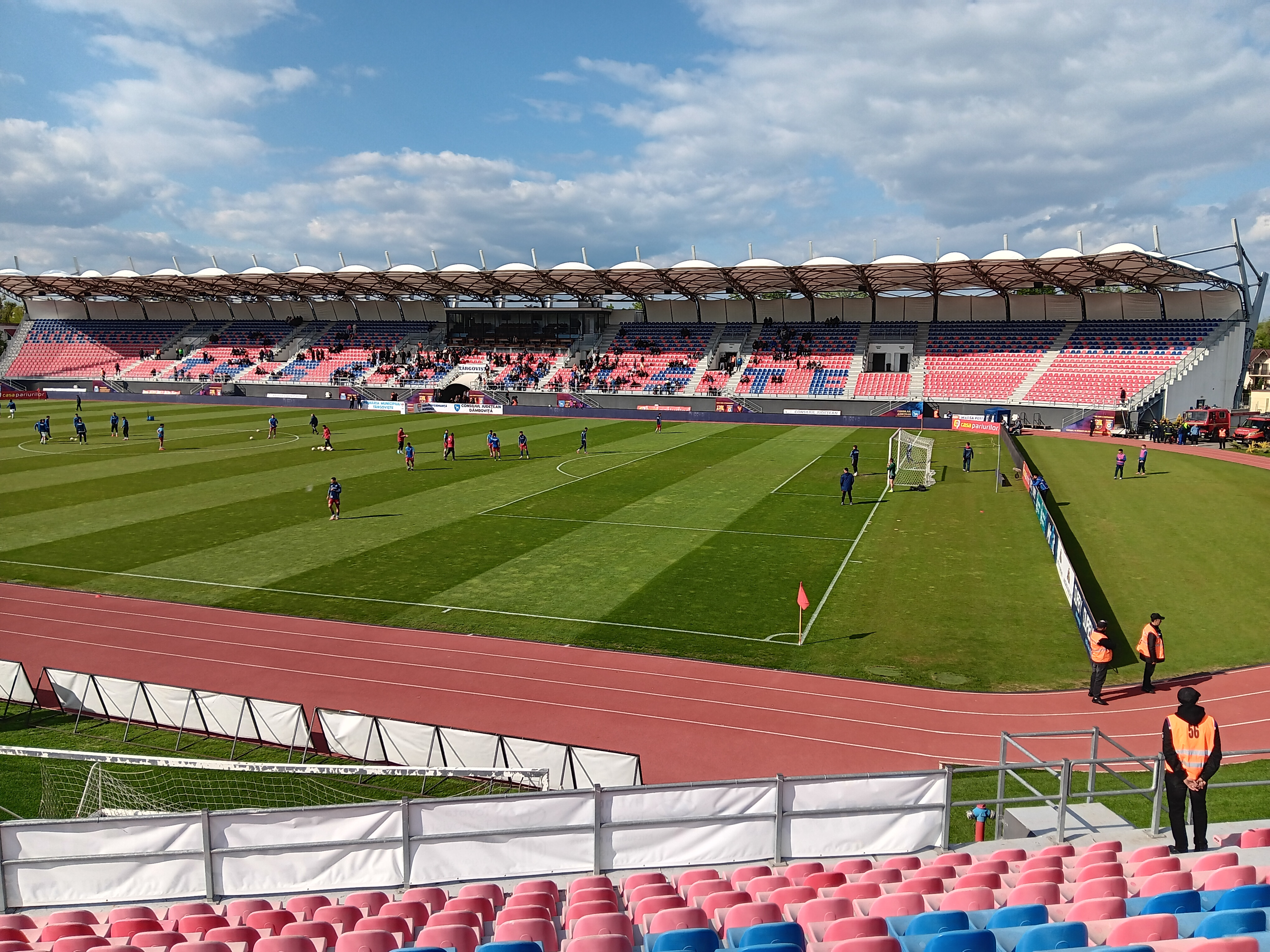
- Interactive map of Eugen Popescu Stadium
- Address: Str. Justiției, nr. 3
- Location: Târgoviște, Romania
- Coordinates: 44°55′53″N 25°27′44″E
- Owner: Municipality of Târgoviște
- Operator: Chindia Târgoviște
- Capacity: 8,066
- Surface: Grass

Construction
- Opened: 7 November 1949
- Renovated: 2019–2023

Tenants
- FCM Târgoviște (1949–2010); Chindia Târgoviște (2010–present)

The Eugen Popescu Stadium is a multi-use stadium in Târgoviște, Romania currently undergoing re-construction. It is used mostly for football matches and is the home ground of Chindia Târgoviște. The stadium held 8,066 people and is located in the town center, next to the Chindia Tower.

== History ==
Construction of the stadium in Târgoviște began in spring 1943, based on a design by architect Filip Teodorescu, but was interrupted by World War II after initial works carried out by local premilitary youths. A post-war attempt to resume construction also failed due to lack of funds, and the site temporarily became a dumping area. Work was restarted in 1948, following a new project by architect Ștefan Boriga and structural engineer Ștefan Levinski, and was completed in early November 1949 through the voluntary efforts of local workers and military units.

The stadium was inaugurated on 7 November 1949, initially having a capacity of around 3,000–4,000 spectators and facilities for football, athletics and other sports. The opening ceremony attracted over 5,000 spectators and included a match between Petrolul Târgoviște and CSCA București, won 4–0 by the visitors. Over time, the venue underwent several name changes, including Tudor Vladimirescu, 7 Noiembrie, Energia, Metalul, CS Târgoviște and Municipal, before being renamed Eugen Popescu in 1996 in honour of the former player and coach of FCM Târgoviște.

The stadium was modernised in the 1970s, with further improvements in subsequent decades, including upgrades in 2005–2006. The most significant redevelopment took place between July 2019 and May 2023, when the stadium, which had reached an advanced state of deterioration, was almost entirely rebuilt to meet UEFA standards. The second stand was demolished and rebuilt with a roof, the main stand underwent major structural repairs, and the former terrace was removed without being replaced. The project cost approximately €15 million, exceeding initial estimates due to rising construction costs and additional consolidation works. The renovated stadium was inaugurated on 19 May 2023 with a Liga I match between Chindia Târgoviște and FC Voluntari.

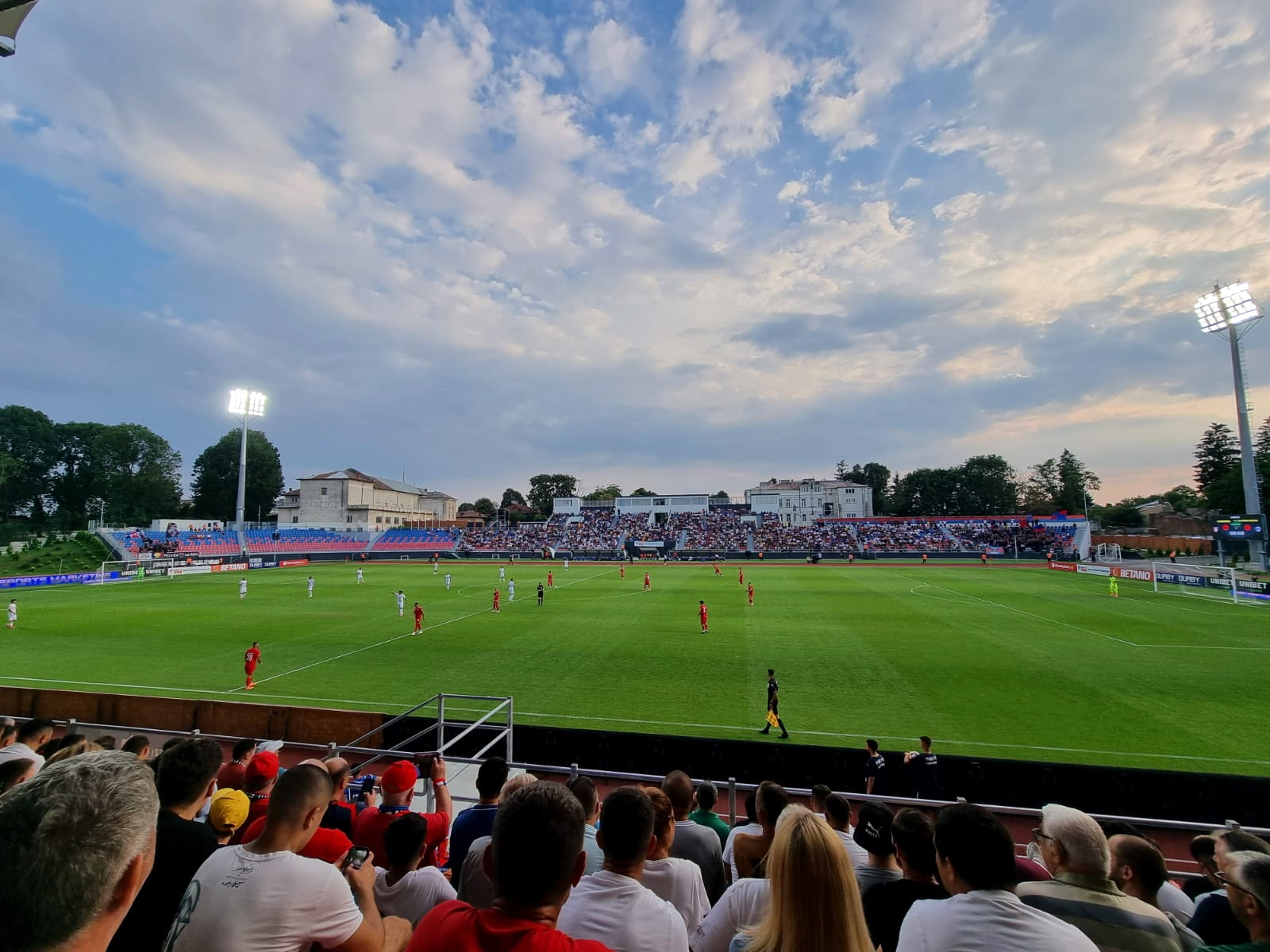
View towards second stand

It currently has an all-seated capacity of 8,066, though effective capacity is limited to approximately 7,200 spectators under Romanian regulations. The venue features floodlighting, a natural grass pitch with undersoil heating, electronic scoreboards, turnstile access, video surveillance, and parking facilities, and hosts the home matches of Chindia Târgoviște as well as youth international fixtures and athletics competitions.
