= Daniel Florea (footballer, born 1988) =

Romanian professional footballer

Personal information
- Full name: Daniel Constantin Florea
- Date of birth: 17 April 1988 (age 38)
- Place of birth: Târgoviște, Romania
- Height: 1.73 m (5 ft 8 in)
- Position: Striker

Youth career
- 1998–2004: Chindia Târgoviște
- 2004–2006: Farul Constanța

Senior career*
Years	Team	Apps	(Gls)
2006–2009	Farul Constanța	15	(2)
2009–2010	Callatis Mangalia		
2010–2013	Delta Tulcea	72	(33)
2013–2015	Concordia Chiajna	40	(4)
2015–2017	Astra Giurgiu	56	(6)
2017	UTA Arad	9	(6)
2018–2022	Chindia Târgoviște	145	(35)
2022–2024	Voluntari	60	(6)
2024–2026	Chindia Târgoviște	53	(17)
Total		450	(109)
- * Club domestic league appearances and goals as of 16 May 2026

Daniel Constantin Florea (born 17 April 1988) is a Romanian former professional footballer who played as a striker.

== Honours ==
Astra Giurgiu

- Liga I: 2015–16
- Supercupa României: 2016

Chindia Târgoviște

- Liga II: 2018–19
