= AFC Chindia Târgoviște =

Romanian association football club

Chindia Târgoviște
- Full name: Asociația Fotbal Club Chindia Târgoviște
- Nickname: Roș-albaștrii (The Red and Blues) Dâmbovițenii (The Dâmbovița People)
- Short name: Chindia
- Founded: 11 August 2010; 16 years ago
- Ground: Eugen Popescu
- Capacity: 8,400
- Owners: Marius Pavel; Dâmbovița County Council; Târgoviște Municipality
- General manager: Florin Gardoș
- Head coach: Leontin Grozavu
- League: Liga II
- 2025–26: Liga II, 6th of 22
- Website: https://www.afcchindiatargoviste.ro/
Home colours	Away colours

Asociația Fotbal Club Chindia Târgoviște (Romanian pronunciation: [kinˈdi.a tɨrˈɡoviʃte]), commonly known as Chindia Târgoviște or simply Chindia, is a Romanian professional football club based in Târgoviște, Dâmbovița County, competing in Liga II.

The club was founded in 2010 by the Târgoviște Municipality, together with former international Gheorghe Popescu and former referee Ion Crăciunescu, following a dispute with the owner of the city's former club, FCM Târgoviște. Chindia retained several elements associated with FCM, including its red and blue colours and the "Chindia" identity.

The club first reached the Romanian top flight in 2019–20 and finished seventh in 2020–21. It plays its home matches at the Eugen Popescu Stadium, which reopened in 2023 after reconstruction.

== History ==
=== FCM Târgoviște (1948–2010) ===
The first major football club from Târgoviște was founded in 1948 and competed under several names, including Metalul Târgoviște, Energia, CS Târgoviște, Oțelul, Chindia and FCM Târgoviște. The club spent nine seasons in the Romanian top flight, achieving its best result with a 7th-place finish in the 1978–79 Divizia A. Its most notable generation included players such as Nicolae Dobrin and Silviu Dumitrescu, legend of Romanian football and player at CS Târgoviște in the 1981–82 season.

After relegation in 1984, the club returned to the first division only in 1996, under the name CF Chindia. The team of that period, largely built around local players, became known as Micul Ajax (lit. 'the Little Ajax') because of its playing style.

Financial problems intensified during the 2000s. Businessman Ghiorghi Zotic took control of the club in 2004, but relations with the Târgoviște Municipality and the club's supporters deteriorated. In 2010, after the lease of Eugen Popescu Stadium was not renewed, FCM moved to Șotânga, while football in Târgoviște entered a new phase.

=== Rebirth as Chindia (2010–present) ===
On 11 August 2010, following the split between Zotic, the Târgoviște Municipality, and supporters, the Municipality, together with former Romanian footballer Gheorghe Popescu and in association with former international referee Ion Crăciunescu, set up a new football club named FC Chindia, based on the structure of CSM Târgoviște, a team founded in 2008 by the Municipality that had taken Progresul Gorgota’s place in Liga III. The club was first conceived as a football academy, similar to the model of the Gheorghe Hagi Football Academy within Viitorul Constanța.

After only one season, Chindia was promoted to Liga II, winning Series III of Liga III with Costel Pană as head coach, assisted by Adrian Bogoi. The squad included, among others, D. Perianu, Pătru, Rădoi, Cârnariu, Dancia, Duță, Mirescu, Honciu, I. Șerban, Dobre, Cherchez, Badea, Radu, and Verdeș.

For the 2011–12 Liga II season, Pană was replaced by Silviu Dumitrescu as head coach. Dumitrescu stepped aside during the winter break, assuming the role of technical director. Flavius Stoican was appointed head coach and led Chindia to a 7th-place finish in Series II, contested by supporters due to results below expectations, with a squad that included, among others, D. Perianu, C. Dinu, Rădoi, Pătru, Mladen, Bușu, Gavrilă, Negoescu, Honciu, I. Șerban, Poiană, Băluță, Anton, Dobre, Cherchez, Verdeș, Voduț, and Radu.

During the 2012–13 season, Stoican resigned after a poor start to the campaign and was replaced by Eusebiu Tudor. Tudor guided the team into a relegation position and was dismissed five rounds before the end, with Silviu Dumitrescu returning to the bench and guiding the team to 12th place, nevertheless, Chindia was ultimately relegated.

The relegation led to internal tensions within the club, with Popescu and Crăciunescu choosing to leave the project. Owned by the Târgoviște Municipality, the Dâmbovița County Council, and Valahia University, Chindia competed in Liga III during the 2013–14 season under the guidance of Silviu Dumitrescu, finishing 1st in the regular season of Series VI, but ultimately ending the campaign in 2nd place after the series play-off stage, tied on points with Fortuna Poiana Câmpina but ranked below them on head-to-head points. Following this campaign, Nicolae Croitoru took over as head coach, under whom Chindia returned to Liga II after winning Series III of the 2014–15 Liga III season.

Under Croitoru, the “Little Ajax” competed in the 2015–16 Liga II campaign in Series II, finishing 2nd in the regular season and ultimately achieving 3rd place after the play-off stage, just one point behind the first two teams, Gaz Metan Mediaș and UTA Arad. The Red and Blues then finished 5th in the first second league season with a single series, before placing 3rd in the 2017–18 season, missing out on promotion after a two-legged promotion/relegation play-off, losing 0–1 at Anghel Iordănescu Stadium and 0–3 on penalties after a 1–0 win at Eugen Popescu Stadium against Voluntari, the 12th-placed team in Liga I. Chindia also reached the Round of 16 of the Cupa României, where it lost 0–2 after extra time against Astra Giurgiu at Marin Anastasovici Stadium.

In June 2018, Viorel Moldovan took over Chindia. Under his leadership, Chindia secured its first-ever promotion to Liga I at the end of the 2018–19 campaign by winning the second division outright. The squad included Aioani, I. Popescu, Acasandrei, Martac, C. Dinu, Șandru, Dumitrașcu, Panait, Vătavu, Cr. Stoica, Rață, Novac, L. Mihai, Mihaiu, Șerban, Neicuțescu, Cherchez, V. Alexandru, D. Florea, and Neguț.

After promotion, the Târgoviște Municipality announced the renovation of the Eugen Popescu Stadium, with Chindia playing its home matches during its inaugural top-flight campaign at Ilie Oană Stadium in the nearby city of Ploiești with the Red and Blues finishing 11th in the regular season and ending last after the relegation play-out stage and avoiding relegation by winning the promotion and relegation play-off against Mioveni (2–0 at home and 1–1 away).

In the following campaign, Emil Săndoi was appointed as head coach with the Red and Blues relocating their home fixtures to the Municipal Stadium in Buzău in February 2021 and finishing 8th in the regular season and achieving their best Liga I result by placing 7th overall after the play-out stage and qualifying for a Europa Conference League play-off where they lost 2–3 to Viitorul Constanța.

In the 2021–22 campaign, the team led by Săndoi returned to Ilie Oană Stadium in September 2021, finishing 11th in the regular season and 13th after the play-out stage and qualifying for the relegation play-offs where it faced the second league side Concordia Chiajna and managed to remain in the top flight after a 2–1 away defeat in Chiajna and a 1–0 home victory, winning 4–1 on penalties in Ploiești.

In the 2022–23 season, Chindia started with Adrian Mihalcea on the bench, but he was dismissed after eleven rounds, the team being last in the standings with only three points and no victories. He was replaced by Anton Petrea. Chindia finished the regular season in 12th place, but ended up in 15th place after the play-out round, thus returning to Liga II after four years in the top flight.

After relegation, Dragoș Militaru was appointed as the new head coach, but was sacked after just three matches and replaced by Vasile Miriuță, who led the team until November 2023, when Chindia was 10th with only 17 points, three points away from the last play-off spot. He was succeeded by Italian Diego Longo, who guided the team through the rest of the 2023–24 campaign, finishing 9th in the regular season and second in Group B of the play-out round.

The instability within the coaching staff continued in the 2024–25 season and was reflected in the team’s results. Chindia started with Marian Vătavu as head coach, but he was replaced in February 2025 by Costel Pană, who led the team to finish in 16th place at the end of the regular season and second-to-last in Group B of the play-out round, avoiding relegation after a play-off match and winning 1–0 in the first leg and 3–2 in the second leg against Dumbrăvița, also second-to-last in Group A of the Liga II play-out.

Chindia recovered strongly in the 2025–26 season and qualified for the promotion play-off, returning to the top six of the second tier. The club competed in the ten-round play-off alongside Voluntari, Sepsi OSK, Corvinul Hunedoara, Steaua București and Bihor Oradea. Although Chindia did not secure promotion, it recorded notable late-season results, including a 1–0 home victory over Corvinul and a 1–1 away draw against Sepsi in the final round.

== Ground ==
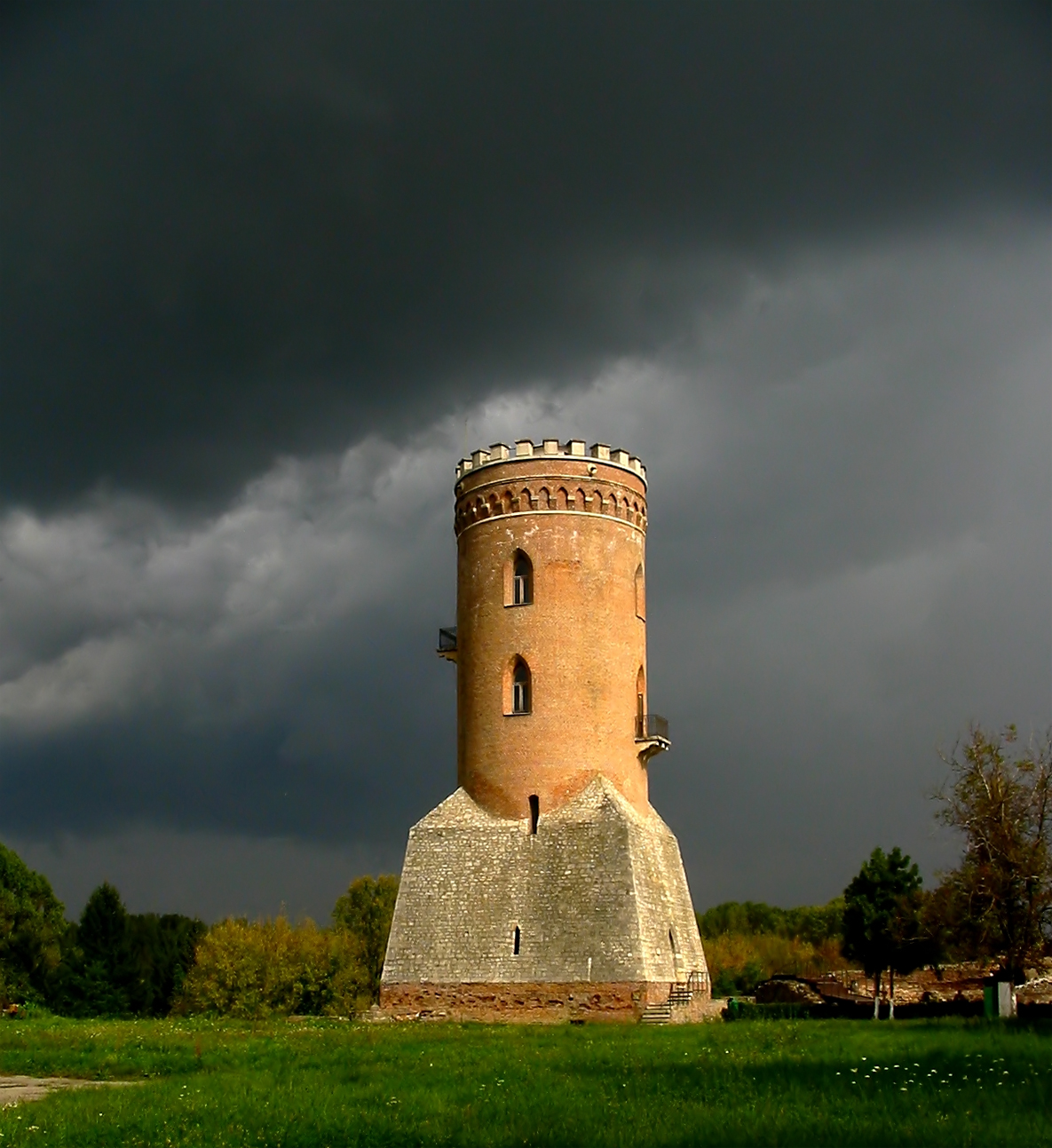
Chindia Tower, the symbol of Târgoviște after which the team is named.

The club plays its home matches on Eugen Popescu Stadium in Târgoviște, which has a capacity of 6,500 seats. Opened in 1982 and originally having a capacity of 12,500 seats, the stadium is situated 200 meters away from the Chindia Tower.

In 2014, the second stand and half of the east end were closed for safety reasons, significantly reducing the arena's capacity. In the spring of 2019, due to team's performances and a potential (and ultimately secured) promotion to the top flight, the Târgoviște Municipality announced the renovation of the stadium for the amount of €16 million. During the renovation work, the team played its home matches on the Ilie Oană and Municipal stadiums, from the nearby cities of Ploiești and Buzău, respectively.

== Support ==
Chindia Târgoviște has an important group supporters in the city and also in Dâmbovița County, the majority of them being past supporters of FCM Târgoviște. The Chindia ultras faction is known as Cavalerii Cetății ("The Knights of the Fortress").

=== Rivalries ===
Chindia does not have many important rivalries, however, a local one between the old FCM and Flacăra Moreni was born before 1989, when the club from Moreni had the support of the communist regime. Tense matches and even incidents were also noted over time in the matches against Petrolul Ploiești and even if between the two clubs is not a proper rivalry, the supporters are not very friendly with each other.

An unusual rivalry also appeared between 2010 and 2015, when on the occasion of six matches, Chindia played against the original FCM Târgoviște, the first club of the city, moved to Șotânga at the time. This encounter was similar to derbies such as ASU Politehnica Timișoara vs ACS Poli Timișoara or CS Universitatea Craiova vs FC U Craiova 1948, entities which assert to be successors of the same teams.

== Honours ==
Liga II

- Winners (1): 2018–19

Liga III

- Winners (2): 2010–11, 2014–15
- Runners-up (1): 2013–14

== Players ==
=== First team squad ===
As of 7 October 2026

Note: Flags indicate national team as defined under FIFA eligibility rules; some limited exceptions apply. Players may hold more than one non-FIFA nationality.

No.	Pos.	Nation	Player
1	GK	ROU	Arsenie Mocan
2	DF	ROU	Florin Gașpăr (on loan from Universitatea Craiova)
3	DF	ROU	Raul Gherman
4	DF	CAF	Dylan Mboumbouni
5	DF	ROU	Marius Briceag (4th captain)
6	DF	ROU	Daniel Celea (Vice-captain)
7	MF	ROU	Alexandru Băluță
8	MF	ESP	Totti
9	FW	ROU	Rareș Mihai
10	FW	ROU	Cristian Neguț (3rd captain)
11	MF	ROU	Georgian Honciu (Captain)
16	DF	GHA	Saeed Issah
17	MF	CIV	Kevin Doukouré
20	MF	ROU	Bogdan Petre
21	FW	GUI	Sekou Camara

No.	Pos.	Nation	Player
23	MF	ROU	Iulian Roșu
25	GK	ROU	Nicolas Căușanu
27	DF	ROU	Cristian Costin
30	DF	ROU	Mario Brumă
33	GK	ROU	George Isvoranu
44	DF	ALB	Amir Bilali
59	MF	ROU	Doru Popadiuc
70	DF	ESP	Xavi Estacio
77	FW	ROU	Vlad Bogdan
88	MF	ROU	David Constantin
90	MF	TOG	Samuel Asamoah
91	FW	ROU	Răzvan Bozieru
94	FW	ROU	Valentin Dumitrache
98	FW	ROU	Mario Vladu
99	DF	ROU	Răzvan Tamași

=== Out on loan ===
Note: Flags indicate national team as defined under FIFA eligibility rules; some limited exceptions apply. Players may hold more than one non-FIFA nationality.

No.	Pos.	Nation	Player
—	GK	ROU	Denis Tănase (at Flacăra Moreni until 30 June 2027)
—	DF	ROU	Raul Neagu (at Flacăra Moreni until 30 June 2027)
—	DF	ROU	Raul Pârvu (at Minerul Lupeni until 30 June 2027)
—	DF	ROU	Eduard Coman (at Pucioasa until 30 June 2027)

No.	Pos.	Nation	Player
—	MF	ROU	Ionatan Dogănoiu (at Flacăra Moreni until 30 June 2027)
—	MF	ROU	Răzvan Tache (at Urban Titu until 30 June 2027)
—	MF	ROU	Ștefan Amuza (at Urban Titu until 30 June 2027)

== Club officials ==
=== Board of directors ===
Role	Name
Owners	(Romania) Marius Pavel (Romania) Dâmbovița County Council (Romania) Târgoviște Municipality
President	(Romania) Marius Pavel
General Manager	(Romania) Florin Gardoș
Marketing Director	(Romania) Cosmin Enache
Technical Director	(Argentina) Cristian Toncheff
Team Manager	(Romania) Cornel Dinu
Delegate	(Romania) Dragoș Pătru
Responsible for Order and Safety	(Romania) Dragoș Clipea
Press Officer	(Romania) Florin Manea
Announcer	(Romania) Cristian Măciucă

- Last updated: 19 September 2025

=== Current technical staff ===
Role	Name
Head coach	(Romania) Leontin Grozavu
Assistant coach	(Romania) Dan Vasilică
Goalkeeping coach	(Romania) Cezar Lungu
Fitness coach	(Romania) Dan Vasilică
Club Doctor	(Romania) Alexandru Catană
Kinetotherapist	(Romania) Alin Draga
Masseur	(Romania) Victor Stan
Storeman	(Romania) Răzvan Toboșaru

- Last updated: 6 October 2026

== Notable former players ==
The footballers enlisted below have had international cap(s) for their respective countries at junior and/or senior level and/or more than 100 caps for AFC Chindia Târgoviște.

Romania

- (Romania) Mihai Aioani
- (Romania) Alexandru Băluță
- (Romania) Cătălin Căbuz
- (Romania) Tiberiu Căpușă
- (Romania) Cristian Cherchez
- (Romania) Denis Ciobotariu
- (Romania) Cristian Dancia
- (Romania) Cornel Dinu
- (Romania) Marco Dulca
- (Romania) Denis Dumitrașcu
- (Romania) Daniel Florea
- (Romania) Paul Iacob
- (Romania) Denis Ispas
- (Romania) Adrian Ioniță
- (Romania) Liviu Mihai
- (Romania) Sebastian Mladen
- (Romania) Mihai Neicuțescu
- (Romania) Dragoș Pătru
- (Romania) Daniel Popa
- (Romania) Sorin Rădoi
- (Romania) Marian Vătavu
- (Romania) Bobi Verdeș
- (Romania) Mihai Voduț

Burkina Faso

- (Burkina Faso) Blaise Yaméogo

Burkina Faso

- (Comoros) Nasser Chamed

Croatia

- (Croatia) Ivan Pešić

Lithuania

- (Lithuania) Modestas Vorobjovas

Moldova

- (Moldova) Victor Bogaciuc
- (Moldova) Maxim Cojocaru
- (Moldova) Daniel Danu
- (Moldova) Vadim Rață

Sweden

- (Sweden) Valmir Berisha

Switzerland

- (Switzerland) Matteo Fedele

== Former managers ==
- (Romania) Costel Pană (2010–2011)
- (Romania) Silviu Dumitrescu (2011)
- (Romania) Flavius Stoican (2012)
- (Romania) Eusebiu Tudor (2012–2013)
- (Romania) Silviu Dumitrescu (2013–2014)
- (Romania) Nicolae Croitoru (2014–2018)
- (Romania) Viorel Moldovan (2018–2020)
- (Romania) Emil Săndoi (2020–2022)
- (Romania) Adrian Mihalcea (2022)
- (Romania) Anton Petrea (2022–2023)
- (Romania) Dragoș Militaru (2023)
- (Romania) Vasile Miriuță (2023)
- (Italy) Diego Longo (2023–2024)
- (Romania) Marian Vătavu (2024–2025)
- (Romania) Costel Pană (2025)
- (Romania) Ilie Poenaru (2025–2026)
- (Romania) Nicolae Croitoru (2026)
- (Romania) Leontin Grozavu (2026–present)

== League and Cup history ==
Season	Tier	Division	Place	Notes	Cupa României
2026–27	2	Liga II	TBD		TBD
2025–26	2	Liga II	6th		Third Round
2024–25	2	Liga II	17th		Third Round
2023–24	2	Liga II	9th		Group Stage
2022–23	1	Liga I	15th (R)	Relegated	Group Stage
2021–22	1	Liga I	13th	Play-off winner	Quarter-finals
2020–21	1	Liga I	7th		Quarter-finals
2019–20	1	Liga I	14th	Play-off winner	Round of 32
2018–19	2	Liga II	1st (C)	Promoted	Round of 32
2017–18	2	Liga II	3rd		Round of 16
2016–17	2	Liga II	5th		Round of 32
2015–16	2	Liga II (Seria II)	3rd		Fourth Round
2014–15	3	Liga III (Seria III)	1st (C)	Promoted	Round of 32
2013–14	3	Liga III (Seria IV)	2nd		Round of 16
2012–13	2	Liga II (Seria I)	12th (R)	Relegated	Fourth Round
2011–12	2	Liga II (Seria II)	7th		Fifth Round
2010–11	3	Liga III (Seria III)	1st (C)	Promoted	
