= 2018–19 FC Universitatea Cluj season =

Universitatea Cluj
2018–19 season
- Owners: Cluj-Napoca Municipality; Babeș-Bolyai University; U Cluj Supporters Association
- Chairman: Radu Constantea
- Manager: Adrian Falub (1–13); Mircea Cojocaru (14–20); Bogdan Lobonț (21–)
- Stadium: Cluj Arena
- Cupa României: Round of 16
Home colours	Away colours	Third colours

The 2018–19 season was the 93rd season of competitive football by Universitatea Cluj, and the 1st in Liga II, after two years of absence, being promoted at the end of the previous season of Liga III. Universitatea Cluj will compete in the Liga II and in Cupa României.

== Previous season positions ==
	Competition	Position
(Romania)	Liga III	1st
(Romania)	Cupa României	Round of 16

== First-team squad ==
Last updated on 8 February 2019

Squad No.	Name	Nationality	Position(s)	Date of birth (age)
Goalkeepers
12	Iulian Dinu	(Romania)	GK	25 March 1998 (age 28)
21	Cosmin Dur-Bozoancă	(Romania)	GK	15 February 1998 (age 28)
33	Andrei Gorcea	(Romania)	GK	2 August 2001 (age 25)
Defenders
3	Dan Berci	(Romania)	LB	15 January 1999 (age 27)
4	Octavian Abrudan (vice-captain)	(Romania)	CB	16 March 1984 (age 42)
6	László Sepsi	(Romania)	LB	7 June 1987 (age 39)
13	Carol Taub	(Romania)	LB	31 January 1993 (age 33)
17	Andrei Cordoș	(Romania)	CB	6 June 1988 (age 38)
22	Tiberiu Căpușă	(Romania)	RB	6 April 1998 (age 28)
27	Jevrem Kosnić	(Serbia)	CB	28 April 1993 (age 33)
—	Răzvan Prodan	(Romania)	CB	18 July 1999 (age 27)
—	Ionuț Ursu	(Romania)	CB	21 March 1989 (age 37)
Midfielders
8	Rareș Takács	(Romania)	RM / RB	10 December 1991 (age 34)
10	George Florescu	(Romania)	DM	21 May 1984 (age 42)
16	Kofi Twumasi	(Ghana)	DM	30 August 1996 (age 30)
20	Doru Dumitrescu	(Romania)	CM	25 May 1998 (age 28)
23	Răzvan Greu	(Romania)	LM	16 March 1995 (age 31)
29	Gabriel Giurgiu (captain)	(Romania)	CM	3 September 1982 (age 44)
77	Denis Hordouan	(Romania)	RW	19 January 1999 (age 27)
91	Alexandru Coman	(Romania)	RW / RB	16 October 1991 (age 35)
—	Norbert János	(Romania)	RW	30 May 1998 (age 28)
Forwards
7	Octavian Ursu	(Romania)	CF	15 November 1994 (age 31)
11	Marius Coman	(Romania)	CF / ST	31 July 1996 (age 30)
18	Dorin Goga (vice-captain)	(Romania)	CF / ST	2 July 1984 (age 42)
30	Iuliu Hațiegan	(Romania)	CF / AM	4 April 1998 (age 28)
93	Cristian Gavra	(Romania)	CF / ST	20 July 1997 (age 29)
—	Mircea Axente	(Romania)	CF / ST	14 March 1987 (age 39)

== Transfers and loans ==
=== Transfers in ===
Entry date	Position	No.	Player	From club	Fee
1 July 2018	GK	21	(Romania) Cosmin Dur-Bozoancă	(Romania) Viitorul Constanța	Loan
1 July 2018	RB	22	(Romania) Tiberiu Căpușă	(Romania) Viitorul Constanța	Loan
1 July 2018	CB	27	(Serbia) Jevrem Kosnić	(Serbia) Vojvodina	Free transfer
1 July 2018	CM	20	(Romania) Doru Dumitrescu	(Romania) Viitorul Constanța	Loan
1 July 2018	DM	16	(Ghana) Kofi Twumasi	(Romania) Viitorul Constanța	Loan
1 July 2018	LB	13	(Romania) Carol Taub	(Romania) ASU Politehnica Timișoara	Free transfer
1 July 2018	CF / AM		(Romania) Florin Burghele	(Romania) CNP Timișoara	Free transfer
1 July 2018	CF / ST	11	(Romania) Marius Coman	(Romania) CFR Cluj	Free transfer
1 July 2018	CF / ST	9	(Romania) Cristian Ene	(Romania) Viitorul Constanța	Free transfer
1 July 2018	CF / ST	93	(Romania) Cristian Gavra	(Romania) Viitorul Constanța	Free transfer
2 August 2018	CB	3	(Romania) Dan Berci	(Italy) Perugia	Free transfer
28 August 2018	LB	6	(Romania) László Sepsi	(Germany) 1. FC Nürnberg	Free transfer
7 September 2018	RB / RW	91	(Romania) Alexandru Coman	(Romania) Hermannstadt	Free transfer
10 January 2019	CB		(Romania) Răzvan Prodan	(Romania) Viitorul Constanța	Loan
10 January 2019	RW		(Romania) Norbert János	(Hungary) Ferencváros	Loan
14 January 2019	CB		(Romania) Ionuț Ursu	(Romania) Sepsi Sfântu Gheorghe	Loan
21 January 2019	CM		(Romania) Daniel Pârvulescu	(Romania) Pandurii Târgu Jiu	€10,000
25 January 2019	CF / ST		(Romania) Mircea Axente	(Romania) Dinamo București	Free transfer
Total					€10,000

=== Transfers out ===
Exit date	Position	No.	Player	To club	Fee
1 July 2018	RB	2	(Romania) Paul Chiș	(Romania) Sticla Arieșul Turda	Free transfer
1 July 2018	CB	16	(Romania) Tudor Telcean	Free agent	Released
1 July 2018	CM		(Romania) Iustin Ardelean	(Romania) Ripensia Timișoara	Free transfer
1 July 2018	AM		(Romania) Alexandru Trancă	(Romania) Pandurii Târgu Jiu	Free transfer
1 July 2018	CF / ST	11	(Romania) Valentin Lemnaru	(Romania) Sticla Arieșul Turda	Free transfer
1 July 2018	CF / ST		(Romania) Adrian Pintea	(Romania) Sănătatea Cluj	Free transfer
13 July 2018	CF / ST		(Romania) Brian Lemac	(Romania) Metalurgistul Cugir	Free transfer
22 August 2018	DM	25	(Romania) Mihai Onicaș	(Romania) Sticla Arieșul Turda	Free transfer
2 September 2018	LB	13	(Romania) Victor Manu	(Romania) Dacia Unirea Brăila	Free transfer
31 December 2018	CF / ST	9	(Romania) Cristian Ene	(Romania) Viitorul Constanța	End of loan
1 January 2019	GK	1	(Romania) Călin Albuț	Retired	—
Total					€0

=== Loans out ===
Start date	End date	Position	No.	Player	To club	Fee
28 August 2018	30 June 2019	GK	22	(Romania) Rareș Pop	(Romania) Sticla Arieșul Turda	None
24 September 2018	30 June 2019	CM	14	(Romania) Adrian Micaș	(Romania) Comuna Recea	None

== Pre-season and friendlies ==
Win Draw Loss

4 July 2018 Friendly	Universitatea Cluj (Romania)	10–0	(Romania) Avrig	Cluj-Napoca, Romania
14:00 UTC+3	M.Coman 7', 25', 33'; Hațiegan 45'; Kosnić 54', 56'; C.Ene 67', 69', 80'; Micaș 75'	Report		Stadium: Cluj Arena

7 July 2018 Friendly	Universitatea Cluj (Romania)	2–0	(Romania) Luceafărul Oradea	Cluj-Napoca, Romania
12:00 UTC+3	M.Coman 52'; Dumitrescu 87'	Report		Stadium: Iuliu Hațieganu; Attendance: 70

14 July 2018 Friendly	Sampierana (Italy)	0–8	(Romania) Universitatea Cluj	Bagno di Romagna, Italy
17:00 UTC+2		Report	Gavra 2'; Abrudan 29'; M.Coman 50', 60'; Dumitrescu 57', 75'; O.Ursu 69', 82'	Stadium: Lago di Acquapartita

18 July 2018 Friendly	Sansepolcro (Italy)	1–12	(Romania) Universitatea Cluj	Bagno di Romagna, Italy
17:00 UTC+2	36'	Report	Gavra 8', 31', 60', 71', 79'; Cordoș 10'; Taub 14'; Dumitrescu 38'; M.Coman 47'; C.Ene 49'; Greu 51'; Florescu 85'	Stadium: Lago di Acquapartita

19 July 2018 Friendly	Romagna Centro (Italy)	1–8	(Romania) Universitatea Cluj	Cesena, Italy
17:00 UTC+2	? 49'	Report	C.Ene 18', 73'; Takács 27', 29'; Cordoș 46'; Hațiegan 67', 75'; Dumitrescu 80'	Stadium: Martorano

21 July 2018 Friendly	Perugia (Italy)	0–1	(Romania) Universitatea Cluj	Perugia, Italy
18:30 UTC+2		Report	Gavra 63'	Stadium: Renato Curi

22 July 2018 Friendly	Rimini (Italy)	3–1	(Romania) Universitatea Cluj	Sant'Agata Feltria, Italy
17:00 UTC+2	Venturini 4'; Battistini 30'; Volpe 68'	Report	Micaș 45'	Stadium: Sant'Agata Feltria

27 July 2018 Friendly	Universitatea Cluj (Romania)	2–0	(Romania) Avântul Reghin	Cluj-Napoca, Romania
18:00 UTC+3	Gavra; Hațiegan	Report		Stadium: Iuliu Hațieganu

26 January 2019 Friendly	Universitatea Cluj (Romania)	5–0	(Romania) Sticla Arieșul Turda	Cluj-Napoca, Romania
13:00 EET (UTC+2)	Gavra; Goga; Abrudan; Florescu; M.Coman	Report		Stadium: Iuliu Hațieganu; Attendance: 300

31 January 2019 Friendly	Cherno More Varna (Bulgaria)	0–0	(Romania) Universitatea Cluj	Alanya, Turkey
EET (UTC+2)		Report		Stadium: Alanya Sports Complex

1 February 2019 Friendly	Pyunik (Armenia)	1–4	(Romania) Universitatea Cluj	Alanya, Turkey
14:00 EET (UTC+2)	54'	Report	Axente 3', 36'; Gavra 39'; János 50'	Stadium: Alanya Sports Complex

4 February 2019 Friendly	Rad (Serbia)	1–1	(Romania) Universitatea Cluj	Alanya, Turkey
EET (UTC+2)	7'	Report	János 37'	Stadium: Alanya Sports Complex

7 February 2019 Friendly	Montana (Bulgaria)	2–0	(Romania) Universitatea Cluj	Alanya, Turkey
EET (UTC+2)	Goal	Report		Stadium: Alanya Sports Complex

8 February 2019 Friendly	Navbahor Namangan (Uzbekistan)	1–0	(Romania) Universitatea Cluj	Alanya, Turkey
EET (UTC+2)	Lukić 30' (pen.)	Report		Stadium: Alanya Sports Complex

16 February 2019 Friendly	Universitatea Cluj (Romania)	3–1	(Romania) Metalurgistul Cugir	Cluj-Napoca, Romania
12:00 EET (UTC+2)	Taub; Goga; M.Coman	Report	Dicu 15'	Stadium: Clujana; Attendance: 150

== Competitions ==
Win Draw Loss

=== Overview ===
Competition	First match	Last match	Starting round	Final position	Record							
Competition	First match	Last match	Starting round	Final position	Pld	W	D	L	GF	GA	GD	Win %
Liga II	3 August 2018	–	Matchday 1	–	38	25	7	6	85	26	+59	65.79
Cupa României	August 2018	–	Fourth Round	–	4	3	0	1	9	6	+3	75.00
Total					42	28	7	7	94	32	+62	66.67

Last updated: 13 July 2018
Source: Competitions

=== Liga II ===
The Liga II fixture list was announced on 19 July 2018.

==== League table ====
Pos	Team	Pld	W	D	L	GF	GA	GD	Pts	Promotion or relegation
1	Chindia Târgoviște (C, P)	38	27	7	4	79	33	+46	88	Promotion to Liga I
2	Academica Clinceni (P)	38	28	3	7	77	24	+53	87	Promotion to Liga I
3	Universitatea Cluj	38	25	7	6	85	26	+59	82	Qualification to promotion play-off
4	Petrolul Ploiești	38	24	5	9	77	38	+39	77	
5	Sportul Snagov	38	21	7	10	56	37	+19	70	

Source: FRF (in Romanian), Soccerway
Rules for classification: 1) Points; 2) Head-to-head points; 3) Head-to-head goal difference; 4) Head-to-head goals scored; 5) Head-to-head away goals scored; 6) Goal difference; 7) Goals scored.
(C) Champions; (P) Promoted

==== Results summary ====
Overall								Home						Away					
Pld	W	D	L	GF	GA	GD	Pts	W	D	L	GF	GA	GD	W	D	L	GF	GA	GD
38	25	7	6	85	26	+59	82	14	3	2	42	13	+29	11	4	4	43	13	+30

Last updated: 1 June 2019.

==== Position by round ====
Round	1	2	3	4	5	6	7	8	9	10	11	12	13	14	15	16	17	18	19	20	21	22	23	24	25	26	27	28	29	30	31	32	33	34	35	36	37	38
Ground	H	A	H	A	H	H	A	H	A	H	A	H	A	H	A	H	A	H	A	A	H	A	H	A	A	H	A	H	A	H	A	H	A	H	A	H	A	H
Result	W	L	W	L	W	W	L	W	D	D	W	W	D	W	W	W	D	D	W	W	W	W	W	W	W	D	L	L	W	W	W	L	W	W	D	W	W	W
Position	5	10	6	9	8	6	8	6	8	8	6	6	6	6	5	4	6	6	5	5	4	3	3	3	3	3	3	3	3	3	3	3	3	3	3	3	3	3

Updated to match(es) played on 1 June 2019. Source: frfotbal.ro
A = Away; H = Home; W = Win; D = Draw; L = Loss

==== Matches ====
Win Draw Loss

3 August 2018 1	Universitatea Cluj	2–0	Metaloglobus București	Târgu Mureș
18:00 EEST (UTC+3)	Florescu 38'; Gavra 48'	Report		Stadium: Trans-Sil; Attendance: 600; Referee: Florin Mazilu (Satu Mare)

13 August 2018 2	Chindia Târgoviște	2–1	Universitatea Cluj	Târgoviște
18:00 EEST (UTC+3)	Cherchez 17' (pen.); L.Mihai 41'	Report	Florescu 66' (pen.)	Stadium: Eugen Popescu; Attendance: 3,500; Referee: Iulian Călin (Ștefănești)

19 August 2018 3	Universitatea Cluj	3–0	Energeticianul	Cluj-Napoca
15:00 EEST (UTC+3)	Gavra 18', 56'; Giurgiu 43'	Report		Stadium: Cluj Arena; Attendance: 3,000; Referee: Florin Marcu (Oradea)

26 August 2018 4	ASU Politehnica Timișoara	1–0	Universitatea Cluj	Timișoara
13:30 EEST (UTC+3)	Velici 5'	Report		Stadium: Dan Păltinișanu; Attendance: 1,500; Referee: Robert Avram (Pitești)

3 September 2018 5	Universitatea Cluj	2–0	Luceafărul Oradea	Cluj-Napoca
18:00 EEST (UTC+3)	Hordouan 8'; Gavra 42'	Report		Stadium: Cluj Arena; Attendance: 3,034; Referee: Viorel Flueran (Craiova)

10 September 2018 6	Universitatea Cluj	3–2	Aerostar Bacău	Cluj-Napoca
18:30 EEST (UTC+3)	Gavra 5'; Twumasi 29'; Takacs 76'	Report	Buhăcianu 26'; Vraciu 86' (pen.)	Stadium: Cluj Arena; Attendance: 3,020; Referee: Mircea Ardelean (Arad)

17 September 2018 7	Argeș Pitești	2–1	Universitatea Cluj	Pitești
18:00 EEST (UTC+3)	Buhăescu 8'; A.Panait 21'	Report	Goga 90+2'	Stadium: Nicolae Dobrin; Attendance: 4,000; Referee: Florin Andrei (Târgu Mureș)

23 September 2018 8	Universitatea Cluj	3–2	Petrolul Ploiești	Cluj-Napoca
18:00 EEST (UTC+3)	O.Ursu 13'; Goga 49', 51'	Report	N.Popescu 90+1'; C.Herea 90+4'	Stadium: Cluj Arena; Attendance: 6,223; Referee: Adrian Comănescu (Rm. Vâlcea)

29 September 2018 9	Mioveni	1–1	Universitatea Cluj	Mioveni
13:00 EEST (UTC+3)	Rădescu 55'	Report	Florescu 67'	Stadium: Orășenesc; Attendance: 800; Referee: Sergiu Popa (Aiud)

7 October 2018 10	Universitatea Cluj	1–1	Daco-Getica București	Cluj-Napoca
12:00 EEST (UTC+3)	Hațiegan 11'	Report	Ad.Voicu 18'	Stadium: Cluj Arena; Attendance: 1,000; Referee: Florin Mazilu (Satu Mare)

10 October 2018 11	Farul Constanța	0–3	Universitatea Cluj	Constanța
16:00 EEST (UTC+3)		Report	Goga 7'; O.Ursu 55'; Florescu 80'	Stadium: Farul; Attendance: 2,000; Referee: Mihai Amorăriței (Câmpina)

13 October 2018 12	Universitatea Cluj	6–1	Dacia Unirea Brăila	Cluj-Napoca
20:30 EEST (UTC+3)	Goga 11'; Ursu 49', 79'; Coman 53', 73'; Greu 87'	Report	van den Driest 86'	Stadium: Cluj Arena; Attendance: 2,583; Referee: Constantin Olaru (Rm. Vâlcea)

18 October 2018 13	Ripensia Timișoara	1–1	Universitatea Cluj	Timișoara
19:00 EEST (UTC+3)	Dumiter 90+2'	Report	Goga 41'	Stadium: Dan Păltinișanu; Attendance: 250; Referee: Cătălin Buși (Rm. Vâlcea

25 October 2018 14	Universitatea Cluj	4–0	ACS Poli Timișoara	Cluj-Napoca
17:45 EEST (UTC+3)	Gavra 25', 70'; Dumitrescu 48'; Goga 87'	Summary		Stadium: Cluj Arena; Attendance: 1,000; Referee: Andrei Moroiță (Ploiești)

4 November 2018 15	UTA Arad	0–4	Universitatea Cluj	Arad
12:00 EET (UTC+2)		Report	Giurgiu 17'; Coman 38'; Gavra 62'; Coman 70'	Stadium: Motorul; Attendance: 2,500; Referee: George Găman (Craiova)

11 November 2018 16	Universitatea Cluj	3–0	Academica Clinceni	Cluj-Napoca
11:30 EET (UTC+2)	Gavra 55'; Al.Coman 65'; Ursu 90+5'	Report		Stadium: Cluj Arena; Attendance: 3,200; Referee: Iulian Călin (Ștefănești)

18 November 2018 17	Sportul Snagov	0–0	Universitatea Cluj	Ghermănești
11:00 EET (UTC+2)		Report		Stadium: Voința; Attendance: 250; Referee: Marian Barbu (Făgăraș)

25 November 2018 18	Universitatea Cluj	0–0	Balotești	Cluj-Napoca
14:30 EET (UTC+2)		Report		Stadium: Cluj Arena; Attendance: 2,000; Referee: Szabolcs Kovács (Carei)

28 November 2018 19	Pandurii Târgu Jiu	1–5	Universitatea Cluj	Târgu Jiu
13:00 EET (UTC+2)	D.Pîrvulescu 78'	Report	C.Ene 32'; Goga 42'; Gavra 66'; Twumasi 89'; Haţiegan 90+1'	Stadium: Tudor Vladimirescu; Attendance: 500; Referee: Florin Andrei (Târgu Mureș)

2 December 2018 20	Metaloglobus București	0–1	Universitatea Cluj	Bucharest
11:00 EET (UTC+2)		Report	Gavra 62'	Stadium: Metaloglobus; Attendance: 300; Referee: Adrian Cojocaru (Galați)

7 December 2018 21	Universitatea Cluj	3–1	Chindia Târgoviște	Cluj-Napoca
19:30 EET (UTC+2)	Hațiegan 36', 90+4'; Gavra 50'	Report	A.Mihaiu 13'	Stadium: Cluj Arena; Attendance: 4,500; Referee: Andrei Antonie (Bucharest)

23 February 2019 22	Energeticianul	0–2	Universitatea Cluj	Petroșani
13:00 EET (UTC+2)		Summary	Florescu 15'; Axente 90+2'	Stadium: Jiul; Attendance: 300; Referee: Florin Ovidiu Mazilu

4 March 2019 23	Universitatea Cluj	1–0	ASU Politehnica Timișoara	Cluj-Napoca
17:30 EET (UTC+2)	Axente 53'	Summary		Stadium: Cluj Arena; Attendance: 4,700; Referee: Rareș George Vidican

10 March 2019 24	Luceafărul Oradea	1–3	Universitatea Cluj	Sânmartin
13:00 EET (UTC+2)	Pop 10'	Summary	Daniel Pârvulescu 15' 68'; Gavra 84'	Stadium: Luceafărul; Attendance: 1,000; Referee: Sergiu Popa

16 March 2019 25	Aerostar Bacău	1–2	Universitatea Cluj	Bacău
15:00 EET (UTC+2)	Valentin Buhăcianu 83'	Summary	Stejărel Vișinar 2' (o.g.); Norbert János 80'	Stadium: Aerostar; Attendance: 1,200; Referee: Lucian Ruşandu

24 March 2019 26	Universitatea Cluj	0–0	Argeș Pitești	Cluj-Napoca
20:00 EET (UTC+2)		Summary		Stadium: Cluj Arena; Attendance: 5,628; Referee: Cătălin Ion Buşi

30 March 2019 27	Petrolul Ploiești	1–0	Universitatea Cluj	Ploiești
18:30 EET (UTC+2)	Moldoveanu 28'	Summary		Stadium: Ilie Oană; Attendance: 10,000; Referee: George Cătălin Găman

6 April 2019 28	Universitatea Cluj	1–2	Mioveni	Cluj-Napoca
19:30 EEST (UTC+3)	Gavra 89'	Summary	Ionuț Rădescu 67'; Balint 81' (pen.)	Stadium: Cluj Arena; Attendance: 3,385; Referee: Florin Ovidiu Mazilu

9 April 2019 29	Daco-Getica București	2–6	Universitatea Cluj	Bucharest
17:30 EEST (UTC+3)	Stănescu 74'; Călințaru 88'	Summary	Gavra 31' 77'; Goga 42' 49'; Daniel Pârvulescu 60'; Iuliu Hațiegan 90+2'	Stadium: Colentina; Attendance: 600; Referee: Florin Andrei

13 April 2019 30	Universitatea Cluj	2–1	Farul Constanța	Cluj-Napoca
14:00 EEST (UTC+3)	Gavra 3'; Goga 59'	Summary	Diogo Rosado 90+4'	Stadium: Cluj Arena; Attendance: 3,426; Referee: Rareș George Vidican

21 April 2019 31	Dacia Unirea Brăila	0–8	Universitatea Cluj	Brăila
11:30 EEST (UTC+3)		Summary	Cordoș 5'; Goga 13' 39' 40' 70'; Norbert János 57'; Gavra 64' 76'	Stadium: Municipal; Attendance: 400; Referee: Eduard Ioniţă

26 April 2019 32	Universitatea Cluj	2–3	Ripensia Timișoara	Cluj-Napoca
18:30 EEST (UTC+3)	Gavra 22'; Iuliu Hațiegan 55'	Summary	Andrei Dumiter 27' 50'; Drăghici 90+7'	Stadium: Cluj Arena; Attendance: 3,020; Referee: Szabolcs Kovacs

5 May 2019 33	ACS Poli Timișoara	0–3	Universitatea Cluj	Timișoara
13:00 EEST (UTC+3)		Summary	Axente 20' (pen.); Abrudan 59'; Gavra 74'	Stadium: Stadionul Electrica; Attendance: 450; Referee: Cristian Codrea

12 May 2019 34	Universitatea Cluj	3–0	UTA Arad	Cluj-Napoca
14:00 EEST (UTC+3)	Goga 9' 62'; Florescu 90+3'	Summary		Stadium: Cluj Arena; Attendance: 6,500; Referee: Viorel Flueran

16 May 2019 35	Academica Clinceni	0–0	Universitatea Cluj	Clinceni
18:00 EEST (UTC+3)		Report		Stadium: Clinceni; Attendance: 1,500; Referee: Lucian Ruşandu

21 May 2019 36	Universitatea Cluj	1–0	Sportul Snagov	Cluj-Napoca
20:30 EEST (UTC+3)	Daniel Pârvulescu 88'	Report		Stadium: Cluj Arena; Attendance: 3,000; Referee: Sergiu Popa

25 May 2019 37	Balotești	0–2	Universitatea Cluj	Balotești
12:00 EEST (UTC+3)		Report	Gavra 43'; Coman 58'	Stadium: Central; Attendance: 300; Referee: Florin Andrei

1 June 2019 38	Universitatea Cluj	2–0	Pandurii Târgu Jiu	Cluj-Napoca
17:00 EEST (UTC+3)	Goga 10' 58'	Report		Stadium: Cluj Arena; Attendance: 5,200; Referee: Sorin Antonie

==== Promotion Play Off ====
9 June 2019 First Leg	Universitatea Cluj	0–2	FC Hermannstadt	Cluj-Napoca
18:00 EEST (UTC+3)			Petrescu 79'; Tsoumou 80'	Stadium: Cluj Arena

12 June 2019 Second Leg	FC Hermannstadt	0–1 (2–1 agg.)	Universitatea Cluj	Sibiu
18:00 EEST (UTC+3)			Goga 64'	Stadium: Stadionul Municipal

As Universitatea Cluj lost the Promotion play-off on aggregate 2–1, Universitatea Cluj remained in Liga II for another season.

=== Cupa României ===
29 August 2018 Third Round	1. FC Gloria	1–2	Universitatea Cluj	Bistrița
16:30 EEST (UTC+3)	Stoianof 85'	Report	M.Coman 64'; Hordouan 74'	Stadium: Jean Pădureanu; Attendance: 1,000; Referee: Cristian Moldoveanu (Sfântu Gheorghe)

13 September 2018 Fourth Round	Comuna Recea	1–3	Universitatea Cluj	Recea
16:30 EEST (UTC+3)	R.Rus 21'	Report	M.Coman 12', 77'; O.Ursu 90+3'	Stadium: Central; Attendance: 1,000; Referee: Szabolcs Kovács (Carei)

26 September 2018 Round of 32	Progresul Spartac București	0–1	Universitatea Cluj	Bucharest
16:30 EEST (UTC+3)		Report	Giurgiu 34' (pen.)	Stadium: Progresul Spartac; Attendance: 400; Referee: Robert Avram (Pitești)

31 October 2018 Round of 16	Universitatea Cluj	3–4 (a.e.t.)	Astra Giurgiu	Cluj-Napoca
19:00 EET (UTC+2)	Abrudan 2'; Taub 5', 8'	Report	Llullaku 14' (pen.), 75'; Cordoș 24' (o.g.); Sepsi 99' (o.g.)	Stadium: Cluj Arena; Attendance: 6,800; Referee: Horia Mladinovici (Bucharest)

== Statistics ==
=== Appearances and goals ===
As of 1 July 2018

No.	Pos	Player	Liga II		Cupa României		Total	
No.	Pos	Player	Apps	Goals	Apps	Goals	Apps	Goals

=== Squad statistics ===
	Liga II	Cupa României	Home	Away	Total Stats
Games played	0	0	0	0	0
Games won	0	0	0	0	0
Games drawn	0	0	0	0	0
Games lost	0	0	0	0	0
Goals scored	0	0	0	0	0
Goals conceded	0	0	0	0	0
Goal difference	0	0	0	0	0
Clean sheets	0	0	0	0	0
Goal by Substitute	0	0	0	0	0
Players used	–	–	–	–	–
Yellow cards	0	0	0	0	0
Red cards	0	0	0	0	0
Winning rate	0%	0%	0%	0%	0%

Last updated: 13 July 2018
Source: Competitive matches

=== Goalscorers ===
As of 24 June 2018

Rank	Position	Name	Liga II	Cupa României	Total
Total			0	0	0

=== Goal minutes ===
	1'–15'	16'–30'	31'–HT	46'–60'	61'–75'	76'–FT	Extra time	Forfeit
Goals	0	0	0	0	0	0	0	0
Percentage	0%	0%	0%	0%	0%	0%	0%	0%

Last updated: 2018 (UTC)
Source: Soccerway

=== Hat-tricks ===
Player	Against	Result	Date	Competition

=== Clean sheets ===
As of 2018

Rank	Name	Liga II	Cupa României	Total	Games played
Total		0	0	0	0

=== Disciplinary record ===
As of 2018

Rank	Position	Name	Liga II			Cupa României			Total		
Rank	Position	Name	Yellow card	(yellow card) (yellow-red card)	Red card	Yellow card	(yellow card) (yellow-red card)	Red card	Yellow card	(yellow card) (yellow-red card)	Red card
Total			0	0	0	0	0	0	0	0	0

=== Attendances ===
As of 2018

	Matches	Attendances	Average	High	Low
Liga II	0	0	0	0	0
Cupa României	0	0	0	0	0
Total	0	0	0	0	0

== See also ==
- 2018–19 Liga II
- 2018–19 Cupa României
