= Eric de Oliveira =

Brazilian-Romanian footballer (born 1985)

Eric
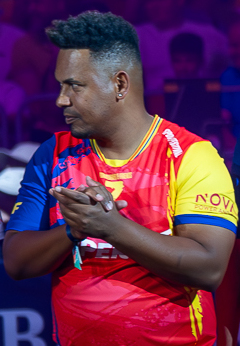
- Eric in 2025

Personal information
- Full name: Eric de Oliveira Pereira
- Date of birth: 5 December 1985 (age 40)
- Place of birth: Nova Iguaçu, Brazil
- Height: 1.74 m (5 ft 9 in)
- Position: Attacking midfielder

Team information
- Current team: ACS Mediaș (head of youth development)

Youth career
- 2002–2004: Flamengo

Senior career*
Years	Team	Apps	(Gls)
2004–2006	CFZ de Brasília		
2006	Paraná	0	(0)
2007	Metropolitano	5	(3)
2007–2011	Gaz Metan Mediaș	117	(36)
2011–2012	Karpaty Lviv	6	(0)
2012–2013	Gaz Metan Mediaș	22	(4)
2013	Pandurii Târgu Jiu	18	(11)
2014	Al-Ahli	9	(1)
2015	Pandurii Târgu Jiu	13	(2)
2015	Matsumoto Yamaga	0	(0)
2016	Najran	12	(4)
2016–2017	Gaz Metan Mediaș	34	(6)
2017–2018	Viitorul Constanța	20	(7)
2018	Al-Markhiya (Note: The statistics for the 2018–19 Qatari Second Division are unavailable.)	9	(3)
2019	Viitorul Constanța	12	(8)
2020–2021	Voluntari	17	(2)
2021	Gaz Metan Mediaș	0	(0)
Total		294	(87)

Managerial career
- 2023–2024: Farul Constanța (scout)
- 2024–: ACS Mediaș (head of youth development)
- * Club domestic league appearances and goals

Eric de Oliveira Pereira (born 5 December 1985), known as Eric, is a Brazilian former professional footballer who played as an attacking midfielder, currently head of youth development at Liga III club ACS Mediaș.

After beginning his career in Brazil, he embarked on numerous stints across Romania, Ukraine, Saudi Arabia, Japan, and Qatar. He achieved most success in Romania, representing Gaz Metan Mediaș, Pandurii Târgu Jiu, Viitorul Constanța and Voluntari.

With 66 goals in the Liga I, Eric is the top foreign scorer in the Romanian championship since 2020. Previously, he was named the Foreign Player of the Year twice, in 2010 and 2013.

== Career ==
=== Early career, Gaz Metan Mediaș and Karpaty Lviv ===
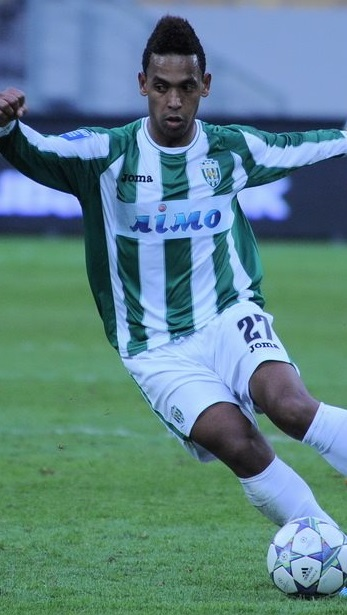
Eric with Karpaty Lviv in 2012

Eric was born on 5 December 1985 in Nova Iguaçu, Brazil and began playing futsal for his school's team. Subsequently, he played for the town's team, winning the Rio de Janeiro state tournament. He was the best player and top-scorer, and his picture appeared in a local newspaper, which was read by the director of Flamengo. The director brought him to the club's junior center in 2002. In 2004 he went to play senior-level football in Série C for CFZ de Brasília. In 2005, Eric was on an unsuccessful trial in Mexico with Alacranes de Durango, but in 2006 he was signed by Série A club, Paraná, but did not get a chance to play due to an injury.

He moved back to Série C, signing with Metropolitano. Eric's performance during Metropolitano's 2007 tournament in Austria attracted the attention of Romanian Liga II club Gaz Metan Mediaș. The club loaned him for one season at a cost of $80,000, and he was presented to the public alongside fellow Brazilian players Cairo Lima and Grillo Edson. He made his Liga II debut in a 3–1 victory against CSM Reșița. The team earned promotion to the first league by the end of the season under coach Cristian Pustai, Eric contributing with 10 goals scored, forming a successful trio in the offence with Claudiu Boaru and Ciprian Prodan. He was permanently transferred by Gaz Metan from Metropolitano for $122,500. Subsequently, he made his Liga I debut on 27 July 2008 in the first round of the season in a 2–2 draw against Oțelul Galați where he received a red card. He scored his first goals in the competition by the end of the season in a 2–1 win over Gloria Buzău from two free kicks. The season was unsuccessful as the team was mathematically relegated, but managed to keep its position in the league because Argeș Pitești was relegated by the Romanian Football Federation for referee corruption. In the first half of the 2009–10 season, Eric scored the only goal of a 1–0 home victory against Dinamo București. He began to score more often in 2010, by the end of the second half of the season managing two consecutive braces in two victories against Politehnica Timișoara and Unirea Alba Iulia. Then he started the following season strongly by netting seven goals in the first four rounds, including three doubles in the first three games against Victoria Brănești, Politehnica Timișoara and Astra Ploiești. By the end of the year he scored the only goal of a 1–0 away victory against Steaua București, and all these performances helped him earn the 2010 Foreign Player of the Year award in front of Júnior Moraes. Overall in the 2010–11 season, Eric scored a personal best of 15 goals, including a brace against CFR Cluj in a 3–2 victory, making him the second top-scorer with three fewer than Politehnica Timișoara's Ianis Zicu. His goals secured the team's seventh-place finish, which led to Gaz Metan's first Europa League qualification after second-place Politehnica Timișoara was relegated by the Romanian Football Federation for license violations. In the 2011–12 Europa League second qualifying round, he played in both legs of the 2–1 victory on aggregate against KuPS.

Shortly afterwards he left Gaz Metan to go on a trial with Bundesliga side VfL Wolfsburg but was not offered a contract, so he moved to Ukraine, signing with Karpaty Lviv. His one-season spell with The Lions was unsuccessful as he played only six league games. In September 2012, Eric returned to Gaz Metan where in the 2012–13 season he played 22 games with four goals scored, and was the team's captain.

=== Pandurii Târgu Jiu and Asian spells ===
On 12 July 2013, Eric went from Gaz Metan Mediaș to Pandurii Târgu Jiu for a transfer fee of €400,000 on the same day as teammate Nicandro Breeveld, reuniting with their former coach from Gaz Metan, Cristian Pustai. He debuted for Pandurii only a few days after his transfer, appearing in the 0–0 draw in the first leg of the 2013–14 Europa League second qualifying round against Levadia Tallinn, where he impressed with his technique and dribbling abilities. Subsequently, he provided two assists in the 4–0 win in the second leg. The club also managed to eliminate Hapoel Tel Aviv against whom Eric scored a goal, and then Braga, reaching the group stage. There, the campaign ended but he still managed to make a good impression by netting a penalty against Dnipro and a very spectacular goal with a scissors kick against Fiorentina. In 2014, UEFA placed his goal against Fiorentina in a top 60 all-time best goals scored in European club and national teams competitions. Eric scored his first league goal for Pandurii in a 2–1 win over Oțelul Galați. Other important goals were the winning goal in the 2–1 victory against Dinamo București, his side's goal in the 1–1 draw against CFR Cluj and two doubles in wins against Botoșani and Brașov. He netted 14 times and provided 12 assists by the end of the first half of the season across all competitions. All these performances earned him the 2013 Foreign Player of the Year award.

In January 2014, Eric was transferred for a fee of €1.25 million from Pandurii to Al-Ahli, signing a contract for one and a half years. His first goal in the league was in a 1–1 draw against Al-Shoulla. He also netted a brace in a 3–0 win over Al-Orobah in the King Cup. Subsequently, in early April he suffered a ligament injury which kept him off the field over six months. Al-Ahli reached the King Cup final, losing 3–0 to Al-Shabab, but Eric could not play due to the injury.

In January 2015, Eric returned to Pandurii Târgu Jiu. The team reached the Cupa Ligii final where coach Edward Iordănescu sent him in the 78th minute to replace Filip Mrzljak, but three minutes later he got injured, the team remaining in 10 players, and eventually losing 3–0 to Steaua București.

On 30 June 2015, Japan's Matsumoto Yamaga announced the signing of Eric from Pandurii, where despite impressing during training sessions, he never got to play in any official games for them. He then returned to the Saudi Professional League, this time at Najran, scoring four goals in 12 league appearances. His best game for them was a 4–3 victory against Al Nassr in which he scored two goals and provided two assists.

=== Gaz Metan Mediaș, Viitorul Constanța, Al-Markhiya and Voluntari ===
In June 2016, Eric went for a third spell at Gaz Metan Mediaș where he was specifically requested by the coach from his previous tenure, Cristian Pustai. In the 2016–17 season, he scored six goals, impressing in the final matches of the season by netting two doubles in two victories against Voluntari and Poli Timișoara, which helped his side avoid relegation.

On 8 July 2017, Eric signed a one-year contract with last season's champions, Viitorul Constanța, where he worked with coach Gheorghe Hagi. In the first half of the season, he scored seven goals and provided five assists, including netting two spectacular goals in a pair of 1–0 wins over FCSB and CFR Cluj. Eric also appeared in the extra time of the 4–0 loss to APOEL Nicosia in the second leg of the 2017–18 Champions League third qualifying round, failing to help his side qualify for the next round even though he had some important opportunities to score.

In January 2018 Viitorul sold him for €100,000 to Al-Markhiya in the Qatar Stars League. Eric scored three goals in nine league appearances, including a brace against Al-Gharafa, but the team was relegated to the second division by the end of the season. He stayed with the club in the second league, scoring a goal directly from a corner kick against Muaither, and also brought former Gaz Metan and Pandurii teammate, Nicandro Breeveld, to the club.

On 12 January 2019, Eric returned to Viitorul Constanța. He helped them win the 2018–19 Cupa României, scoring in extra time the decisive goal of the 2–1 victory against Astra Giurgiu in the final. Eric started the following season strongly by netting five goals in the first five rounds, but then an injury and his physical condition made Hagi sideline him for most of the first half of the season.

In January 2020 he signed with Voluntari. There, in a 2–0 win over Hermannstadt, he scored his 65th Liga I goal from a penalty kick, which made him the competition's best foreign scorer, surpassing fellow Brazilian Wesley. One year later, Eric left Voluntari and signed a six-month contract for a fourth spell with Gaz Metan Mediaș, but he did not make a single appearance for them due to an injury. Eric has a total of 222 games in Liga I with 66 goals scored and 48 assists provided, also totaling 17 appearances with three goals in European competitions.

== After retirement ==
In 2022, after Gaz Metan Mediaș was dissolved, Eric was one of the founding members of the town's new club, ACS Mediaș. Between 2023 and 2024, he worked as a scout for Farul Constanța. In 2024, he returned to ACS Mediaș in order to work for the club's youth center.

== Personal life ==
In July 2011, Eric and Romanian handball player Cosmina Dancu had their first son, whom they named Deric. He married Cosmina two years later and their second son, Anthony, was born in 2015. Eric's cousin, Vitinho, was also a professional footballer, and they played together for a while at Gaz Metan Mediaș.

After ending his playing career, Eric settled in Romania. He was very attached to the country, stating in a 2021 interview:"I am 50% Brazilian, 50% Romanian, actually Transylvanian. I'm Eric from Mediaș, not from somewhere else. I don't have citizenship yet, but I can apply, I will do it as soon as possible, now it is clear that I will spend my life here."

== Honours ==
Al-Ahli

- King Cup runner-up: 2014

Pandurii Târgu Jiu

- Cupa Ligii runner-up: 2014–15

Viitorul Constanța

- Cupa României: 2018–19
- Supercupa României: 2019

Individual

- Gazeta Sporturilor Foreign Player of the Year in Romania: 2010, 2013
- Liga I Player of the Month: September 2013, October 2013

Records

- Foreign top-scorer in Liga I: 66 goals
