= ACS Mediaș =

Association football club in Mediaș

- Full name: Asociația Club Sportiv; Mediaș 2022
- Nicknames: Lupii negri (The Black Wolves); Gaziștii (The Refinery Workers); Alb-negrii (The White-Blacks)
- Short name: Mediaș
- Founded: 14 July 2022; 4 years ago
- Ground: Gaz Metan
- Capacity: 7,814
- Owner: Gaz Metan Legends Association
- Chairman: Ionuț Buzean
- Manager: Cosmin Vâtcă
- League: Liga III
- 2025–26: Liga III, Seria VI, 5th
| Home colours | Away colours |

Asociația Club Sportiv Mediaș 2022, commonly known as ACS Mediaș, or simply as Mediaș, is a Romanian football club based in Mediaș, currently playing in the Liga III.

It was founded in 2022, as a phoenix club of Gaz Metan Mediaș which was dissolved in the same summer, due to financial issues. The owners of the new entity are former players and coaches of Gaz Metan who want to continue the football tradition in the city, and also regain the name, crest and records of the defunct club. The nine founding members are Ionuț Buzean, Cristian Pustai, Doru Dudiță, Eric de Oliveira, Claudiu Boaru, Costel Hanc, Eugen Pîrvulescu, Iosif Biro and Dorin Roșca.

== Support ==
ACS Mediaș supporters are in fact the supporter of former Gaz Metan Mediaș and has many supporters in Mediaș and especially in Sibiu County. The ultras groups of ACS Mediaș are known as Lupii Negri (The Black Wolves) and Commando Mediensis, former ultras groups of defunct Gaz Metan

=== Rivalries ===
The most important rivalries for ACS Mediaș are against football clubs from Sibiu, such as: Inter Sibiu, Voința Sibiu or FC Hermannstadt.

== Honours ==
Liga IV – Sibiu County

- Winners (1): 2022–23

== Players ==
=== First team squad ===
As of 10 September 2024

Note: Flags indicate national team as defined under FIFA eligibility rules; some limited exceptions apply. Players may hold more than one non-FIFA nationality.

| No. | Pos. | Nation | Player |
|---|---|---|---|
| 1 | GK | ROU | Fabio Blaga |
| 4 | DF | ROU | Paolo Stan |
| 5 | DF | ROU | Bogdan Pop |
| 6 | MF | ROU | Mario Raica |
| 7 | FW | ROU | Octavian Ursu |
| 8 | MF | ROU | Mihai Stancu |
| 9 | FW | ROU | Lucian Noian |
| 10 | MF | ROU | Cătălin Tineiu |
| 11 | FW | ROU | Raul Orlandea |
| 12 | GK | ROU | Simion Bumbar |
| 15 | MF | ROU | Dorinel Todoran |
| 17 | DF | ROU | Sebastian Bîrsan |

| No. | Pos. | Nation | Player |
|---|---|---|---|
| 19 | MF | ROU | Alin Dohotariu |
| 20 | MF | ROU | Răzvan Vîlea |
| 21 | FW | ROU | Cristian Pajco |
| 22 | DF | ROU | Sergiu Gurei |
| 23 | MF | ROU | Răzvan Greu |
| 24 | DF | ROU | Cristian Maxim (on loan from UTA Arad) |
| 26 | DF | ROU | Mihai Țala |
| 28 | MF | ROU | Casian Cîmpean |
| 33 | GK | ROU | Ionuț Neacșa |
| 38 | MF | ROU | Patrick Cristea |
| 52 | DF | ROU | Eduard Avram (Captain) |
| 77 | MF | ROU | Andrei Bîrsan |

=== Out on loan ===
Note: Flags indicate national team as defined under FIFA eligibility rules; some limited exceptions apply. Players may hold more than one non-FIFA nationality.

| No. / Pos. / Nation / Player | No. / Pos. / Nation / Player |

== Club officials ==
=== Board of directors ===
| Role | Name |
|---|---|
| Owner | (Romania) Gaz Metan Legends Association |
| President | (Romania) Ionuț Buzean |
| Sporting Director | (Romania) vacant |
| Head of Youth Center | (Romania) (Brazil) Eric |

=== Current technical staff ===
| Role | Name |
|---|---|
| Manager | (Romania) Cosmin Vâtcă |
| Assistant manager | (Brazil) Eric de Oliveira |
| Goalkeeping coach | (Romania) Dorin Roșca |
| Fitness coach | (Romania) Doru Dudiță |

== League history ==
| Season | Tier | Division | Place | Notes | Cupa României |
|---|---|---|---|---|---|
| 2025–26 | 3 | Liga III (Seria VI) | TBD | | |
| 2024–25 | 3 | Liga III (Seria VII) | 4th | | |

| Season | Tier | Division | Place | Notes | Cupa României |
|---|---|---|---|---|---|
| 2023–24 | 3 | Liga III (Seria IX) | 3rd | | |
| 2022–23 | 4 | Liga IV (SB) | 1st (C) | Promoted | |
