= Narcisse Bambara =

Burkinabé footballer

Personal information
- Full name: Narcisse Kiswensia Bambara
- Date of birth: 23 June 1989 (age 37)
- Place of birth: Ouagadougou, Burkina Faso
- Height: 1.89 m (6 ft 2 in)
- Position: Left back

Senior career*
Years	Team	Apps	(Gls)
2011–2012	Étoile Filante		
2012–2014	Concordia Chiajna	42	(1)
2014–2015	Universitatea Cluj	15	(0)
2015–2016	RC Kadiogo		
2016–2018	Étoile Filante		
2018	Speranța Nisporeni	7	(0)
2018	Zimbru Chișinău	8	(0)
2019–2020	Étoile Filante	3	(0)
2020–2022	RC Kadiogo	21	(0)
Total		96	(1)

International career
2012–2017	Burkina Faso	16	(0)
- * Club domestic league appearances and goals

Narcisse Kiswensia Bambara (born 23 June 1989) is a Burkinabe former professional footballer who played as a left-back.

== Club career ==
Bambara was born on 23 June 1989 in Ouagadougou, Burkina Faso and began playing senior-level football in 2011 at local club Étoile Filante.

In 2012, he joined Romanian side Concordia Chiajna, making his Liga I debut under coach Ilie Stan on 15 September 2012 in a 3–1 away win over Gaz Metan Mediaș. He scored his only goal in the league on 17 May 2013 when he opened the score with a six-meter header in a 1–1 draw against CFR Cluj. For the 2014–15 season, Bambara went to play for Universitatea Cluj with whom he reached the 2015 Cupa României final where coach Adrian Falub sent him in the 56th minute to replace Petar Jovanović in the eventual 3–0 loss to Steaua București. In his three seasons spent in Romania, Bambara amassed a total of 67 Liga I games with one goal scored.

In 2015, Bambara went back to his country at RC Kadiogo with whom he won the 2015–16 Burkinabé Premier League. Subsequently, he went to play two seasons for the club where he started his career, Étoile Filante.

In March 2018, he returned to Europe, joining Moldovan National Division club Speranța Nisporeni, and made his league debut under coach Cristian Efros on 1 April in a 0–0 draw against Zaria Bălți. After playing seven games for Nisporeni, Bambara went to play for the second half of the season at Zimbru Chișinău where he made eight appearances.

In 2019, Bambara returned to Étoile Filante for a third time. After one year he moved for a second spell at RC Kadiogo. There, in the 2021–22 season he won the Burkinabé Premier League title, playing nine games in the campaign, retiring afterwards.

== International career ==
Bambara played 16 games for Burkina Faso, making his debut on 26 May 2012 under coach Paul Put in a 2–2 friendly draw against Benin. His following appearance was 4–0 win over Niger during the 2014 World Cup qualifiers. Afterwards, Bambara played five matches in the successful 2015 Africa Cup of Nations qualifiers. Coach Put selected him to be part of the squad that went to the final tournament, playing only in a 2–0 loss to Gabon, as the team failed to progress from their group. Bambara's last two games for The Stallions were a 1–0 away loss to Botswana during the 2017 Africa Cup of Nations qualifiers and a 2–2 draw against Ghana in the 2018 African Nations Championship qualifiers.

== Honours ==
Universitatea Cluj

- Cupa României runner-up: 2014–15

RC Kadiogo

- Burkinabé Premier League: 2015–16, 2021–22
