= Mihai Țala =

Romanian footballer

Personal information
- Full name: Mihai Gabriel Țala
- Date of birth: 26 September 2004 (age 22)
- Place of birth: Mediaș, Romania
- Position: Defender

Team information
- Current team: Mediaș
- Number: 26

Youth career
- Gaz Metan Mediaș

Senior career*
Years	Team	Apps	(Gls)
2022	Gaz Metan Mediaș	12	(0)
2022–	Mediaș	13	(1)
- * Club domestic league appearances and goals as of 10:23, 8 November 2024 (UTC)

Mihai Gabriel Țala (born 26 September 2004) is a Romanian professional footballer who played as a defender for Liga III side ACS Mediaș.
