= Cristian Maxim =

Romanian footballer (born 2003)

Personal information
- Date of birth: 26 April 2003 (age 23)
- Place of birth: Mediaș, Romania
- Height: 1.80 m (5 ft 11 in)
- Position: Right midfielder

Team information
- Current team: Mediaș (on loan from UTA Arad)
- Number: 24

Youth career
- –2022: Gaz Metan Mediaș

Senior career*
Years	Team	Apps	(Gls)
2022	Gaz Metan Mediaș	13	(0)
2022–	UTA Arad	2	(0)
2023–	→ Mediaș (loan)	38	(2)
- * Club domestic league appearances and goals as of 10:22, 8 November 2024 (UTC)

Cristian Maxim (born 26 April 2003) is a Romanian professional footballer who plays as a right midfielder for ACS Mediaș, on loan from UTA Arad.

== Honours ==
ACS Mediaș

- Liga IV: 2022–23
