= Ciprian Prodan =

Romanian footballer

Personal information
- Full name: Ciprian Cornel Prodan
- Date of birth: 28 April 1979 (age 47)
- Place of birth: Satu Mare, Romania
- Height: 1.83 m (6 ft 0 in)
- Position: Forward

Youth career
- 1986–1996: Olimpia Satu Mare

Senior career*
Years	Team	Apps	(Gls)
1996–1999	Olimpia Satu Mare	17	(0)
1999–2001	ASA Târgu Mureș	38	(13)
2001–2002	Universitatea Cluj	26	(12)
2002–2004	Politehnica Timișoara	46	(7)
2004–2005	Ethnikos Asteras		
2005–2006	Brașov	27	(14)
2006–2009	Gaz Metan Mediaș	85	(33)
2009–2010	FCM Târgu Mureș	20	(6)
2010	Victoria Brănești	9	(0)
2011	Spicul Mopan		
2011–2013	Olimpia Satu Mare		
Total		268	(85)

Managerial career
- 2013–2017: Olimpia Satu Mare (assistant)
- * Club domestic league appearances and goals

Ciprian Cornel Prodan (born 28 April 1979) is a Romanian former footballer who played as a forward. Starting and rounding off his career at Olimpia Satu Mare, he spent his career in Romania except one year in Greece.

== Career ==
Prodan was born on 28 April 1979 in Satu Mare, Romania and began playing junior-level football in 1986 at local club Olimpia. He started his senior career at Olimpia during the 1995–96 Divizia B season. He helped them gain promotion to the first league at the end of the 1997–98 season. Subsequently, Prodan made his Divizia A debut on 10 April 1999 under coach Gheorghe Staicu in a 1–0 loss to Foresta Suceava. However, he could not avoid the team's relegation to Divizia B. In the middle of the 1999–2000 season, he left Olimpia to join ASA Târgu Mureș. For the 2001–02 season, Prodan went to play for Universitatea Cluj, scoring 12 goals in 26 league appearances. In 2002, he returned to Divizia a football, signing with Politehnica Timișoara. There, he scored his first top-tier goal on 15 November 2002 in a 2–0 win over Ceahlăul Piatra Neamț. Following two seasons with Politehnica, he spent the 2004–05 season at Greek second-tier club Ethnikos Asteras. Afterwards, Prodan returned to Romania and went to Divizia B club Brașov, where he showed an appetite for goals, netting 14 times during the 2005–06 season. In 2006, he moved to another second-tier club Gaz Metan Mediaș, continuing to score regularly there. He helped them gain promotion in the 2007–08 season by scoring 15 goals under coach Cristian Pustai, forming a successful offensive trio with Claudiu Boaru and Eric de Oliveira. After spending the 2008–09 season in the first league with Gaz Metan, he returned to the second league by joining FCM Târgu Mureș for the 2009–10 season and scored six goals to help them achieve promotion. Prodan's next spell was at Victoria Brănești, where he made his last Liga I appearance on 4 October 2010 in a 0–0 draw against his former side FCM Târgu Mureș, totaling 88 matches with nine goals in the competition. He spent the following years of his career in the third league for Spicul Mopan and Olimpia Satu Mare. After he helped the latter gain promotion to the second league in the 2012–13 season, Prodan retired.

== Personal life ==
His older brother, Daniel, was also a professional footballer.

== Honours ==
Olimpia Satu Mare

- Divizia B: 1997–98
- Liga III: 2012–13

FCM Târgu Mureș

- Liga II: 2009–10
