= Nicandro Breeveld =

Surinamese footballer

Personal information
- Full name: Nicandro Hemsley Breeveld
- Date of birth: 7 October 1986 (age 40)
- Place of birth: Paramaribo, Suriname
- Height: 1.78 m (5 ft 10 in)
- Position: Defensive midfielder

Youth career
- Haarlem
- Argon
- –2005: Zeeburgia

Senior career*
Years	Team	Apps	(Gls)
2005–2006	Zeeburgia		
2006–2008	Omniworld	38	(1)
2008–2010	Telstar	38	(5)
2010	Astra Ploiești	0	(0)
2011	Jiul Petroșani	15	(4)
2011–2013	Gaz Metan Mediaș	53	(2)
2013–2014	Pandurii Târgu Jiu	28	(2)
2014–2016	Steaua București	37	(1)
2016–2017	Dibba Al-Fujairah	5	(0)
2017–2018	Omonia	30	(1)
2018–2019	Al-Markhiya		
2019–2020	Politehnica Iași	33	(1)
2022	JOS	1	(0)
Total		278	(17)
- * Club domestic league appearances and goals

Nicandro Hemsley Breeveld (born 7 October 1986) is a Surinamese former professional footballer who played as a defensive midfielder.

== Career ==
=== Early career ===
Breeveld was born on 7 October 1986 in Paramaribo, Suriname. When he was around five years old, his family moved to the Netherlands. He began playing junior-level football for several clubs in Amsterdam. Breeveld joined second-tier club Omniworld in 2006, making his Eerste Divisie debut on 11 August under coach Jan Schulting in a 3–0 away loss to FC Dordrecht. He scored his first goal in the competition on 27 April 2007 in a 4–1 loss to SC Cambuur. In 2008, he moved to Telstar. At age 24, he was close to a move to AZ Alkmaar, but after suffering an injury, the transfer fell through.

=== Astra Ploiești and Jiul Petroșani ===
In April 2010, Breeveld joined Romanian first-tier club Astra Ploiești, but did not make any appearances in official matches. Subsequently, he went on a trial with Gaz Metan Mediaș where he impressed coach Cristian Pustai but was not offered a contract because the club had too many midfielders under contract. Eventually, he went to play for half a season in Liga IV at Jiul Petroșani. Breeveld played 15 matches and scored four goals under coach Daniel Huza to help Jiul gain promotion to Liga III at the end of the 2010–11 season.

=== Gaz Metan Mediaș ===
In 2011, Breeveld was signed by Gaz Metan Mediaș, as the club needed a replacement for Michal Kubala. He made his Liga I debut under coach Pustai in a 2–1 away loss to FC Brașov. Breeveld played six games in the 2011–12 Europa League campaign, as they eliminated KuPS, Mainz and eventually got defeated 3–2 on aggregate in the play-off by Austria Wien against whom he scored one goal. He netted his first Liga I goal on 3 May 2013 in a 3–1 victory against Ceahlăul Piatra Neamț.

=== Pandurii Târgu Jiu ===
On 12 July 2013, Breeveld went from Gaz Metan Mediaș to Pandurii Târgu Jiu on the same day as teammate Eric de Oliveira, reuniting with their former coach from Gaz Metan, Cristian Pustai. He debuted for Pandurii only a few days after his transfer, appearing in the 0–0 draw in the first leg of the 2013–14 Europa League second qualifying round against Levadia Tallinn. Subsequently, he scored a goal in the 4–0 win in the second leg. The club also managed to eliminate Hapoel Tel Aviv, and then Braga, reaching the group stage. There, he played in all six games as the campaign ended.

=== Steaua București ===
On 11 August 2014, Breeveld signed a two-year contract with Steaua București which paid Pandurii a €500,000 transfer fee. He helped the team win The Treble in the 2014–15 season. He was used by coach Constantin Gâlcă in 23 league matches. Subsequently, he played the entire match in the 3–0 win over Pandurii Târgu Jiu in the Cupa Ligii final. He also played the full 90 minutes in another 3–0 victory against Universitatea Cluj in the Cupa României final. Furthermore, Breeveld played three games in the Europa League group stage. He was removed from the team roster after refusing to extend his contract in October 2015.

=== Dibba Al-Fujairah, Omonia and Al-Markhiya ===
In the summer of 2016, Breeveld moved to Emirati club Dibba Al-Fujairah. After making five league appearances in the UAE Pro League, he joined Cypriot club Omonia Nicosia in January 2017. He made his Cypriot First Division debut on 28 January 2017, when coach John Carver sent him in the 76th minute to replace Renato Margaça in a 3–0 win over Nea Salamis. On 19 February, he scored his first goal in the competition in a 4–2 away loss to AEK Larnaca.

In June 2018, Breeveld was brought by his former Gaz Metan and Pandurii teammate, Eric de Oliveira, to Qatari Second Division club Al-Markhiya.

=== Politehnica Iași and JOS ===
On 11 July 2019, Breeveld returned to the Romanian championship after putting pen to paper on a two-year deal with Liga I club Politehnica Iași. He made his last Liga I appearance on 11 December 2020 in Politehnica's 4–1 away loss to Dinamo București, totaling 151 matches with six goals in the competition.

Breeveld ended his career playing for JOS during the 2022–23 Derde Divisie season.

== Career statistics ==
Appearances and goals by club, season and competition
Club	Season	League			National Cup (Note: Includes KNVB Beker, Cupa României, UAE President's Cup, Cypriot Cup)		League Cup (Note: Includes Cupa Ligii)		Continental		Other		Total	
Club	Season	Division	Apps	Goals	Apps	Goals	Apps	Goals	Apps	Goals	Apps	Goals	Apps	Goals
Omniworld	2006–07	Eerste Divisie	28	1	1	0	–		–		–		29	1
Omniworld	2007–08	Eerste Divisie	10	0	1	0	–		–		–		11	0
Omniworld	Total		38	1	2	0	–		–		–		40	1
Telstar	2008–09	Eerste Divisie	27	3	2	0	–		–		–		29	3
Telstar	2009–10	Eerste Divisie	11	2	1	0	–		–		–		12	2
Telstar	Total		38	5	3	0	–		–		–		41	5
Astra Ploiești	2010–11	Liga I	0	0	0	0	–		–		–		0	0
Jiul Petroșani	2010–11	Liga IV	15	4	–		–		–		–		15	4
Gaz Metan Mediaș	2011–12	Liga I	31	0	4	0	–		6 (Note: Appearances in UEFA Europa League)	1	–		41	1
Gaz Metan Mediaș	2012–13	Liga I	22	2	2	0	–		–		––		24	2
Gaz Metan Mediaș	Total		53	2	6	0	–		6	1	–		65	3
Pandurii Târgu Jiu	2013–14	Liga I	26	2	1	0	–		11	1	–		38	3
Pandurii Târgu Jiu	2014–15	Liga I	2	0	–		0	0	–		–		2	0
Pandurii Târgu Jiu	Total		28	2	1	0	0	0	11	1	–		40	3
Steaua București	2014–15	Liga I	23	0	5	0	4	1	5 (Note: Two appearances in UEFA Champions League, three appearances in UEFA Europa League)	0	–		37	1
Steaua București	2015–16	Liga I	14	1	2	0	0	0	4 (Note: Appearances in UEFA Champions League)	0	0	0	20	1
Steaua București	Total		37	1	7	0	4	1	9	0	0	0	57	2
Dibba Al-Fujairah	2016–17	UAE Pro League	10	0	3	0	0	0	–		–		13	0
Omonia	2016–17	Cypriot First Division	14	1	2	0	–		–		–		16	1
Omonia	2017–18	Cypriot First Division	16	0	1	0	–		–		–		17	0
Omonia	Total		30	1	3	0	–		–		–		33	1
Al-Markhiya	2018–19	Qatari Second Division					–		–		–			
Politehnica Iași	2019–20	Liga I	24	1	2	2	–		–		–		26	3
Politehnica Iași	2020–21	Liga I	9	0	0	0	–		–		–		9	0
Politehnica Iași	Total		33	1	2	2	–		–		–		35	3
JOS	2022–23	Derde Divisie	1	0	1	0	–		–		–		2	0
Career total			283	17	28	2	4	1	26	2	0	0	341	20

== Honours ==
Jiul Petroșani

- Liga IV – Hunedoara County: 2010–11

Steaua București

- Liga I: 2014–15
- Cupa României: 2014–15
- Cupa Ligii: 2014–15
