= Flavius Șomfălean =

Romanian footballer

Personal information
- Full name: Flavius Ioan Șomfălean
- Date of birth: 13 December 1973 (age 52)
- Place of birth: Târgu Mureș, Romania
- Height: 1.85 m (6 ft 1 in)
- Positions: Center back; right back

Senior career*
Years	Team	Apps	(Gls)
1991–1994	ASA Târgu Mureș	19	(1)
1994–2009	Gaz Metan Mediaș	365	(14)
Total		384	(15)

Managerial career
- 2009–2013: Gaz Metan Mediaș (assistant)
- 2013–2014: Pandurii Târgu Jiu (assistant)
- 2014: ASA Târgu Mureș (assistant)
- 2015: Rapid București (assistant)
- 2015–2018: Gaz Metan Mediaș (assistant)
- 2018–2019: CSM Târgu Mureș
- * Club domestic league appearances and goals

Flavius Ioan Șomfălean (born 13 December 1973) is a Romanian former football defender. After he ended his playing career he worked for a while as Cristian Pustai's assistant coach at several clubs. In 2019 he started his career as a head coach at CSM Târgu Mureș.

== Honours ==
Gaz Metan Mediaș

- Divizia B: 1999–00
