= Simion Bumbar =

Romanian footballer (born 2005)

Simion Bumbar.
Personal information
- Date of birth: 29 March 2005 (age 21)
- Place of birth: Vișeu de Sus, Romania
- Height: 1.81 m (5 ft 11 in)
- Position: Goalkeeper

Team information
- Current team: Mediaș
- Number: 12

Youth career
- –2022: Gaz Metan Mediaș

Senior career*
Years	Team	Apps	(Gls)
2022	Gaz Metan Mediaș	7	(0)
2022–2024	1599 Șelimbăr	0	(0)
2024–	Mediaș	0	(0)
- * Club domestic league appearances and goals as of 10:18, 8 November 2024 (UTC)

Simion Bumbar (born 29 March 2005) is a Romanian professional footballer who plays as a goalkeeper for Liga III side ACS Mediaș.
