= Eduard Avram =

Romanian professional footballer

Personal information
- Full name: Eduard Cristian Avram
- Date of birth: 11 March 2003 (age 23)
- Place of birth: Mediaș, Romania
- Height: 1.86 m (6 ft 1 in)
- Position: Defender

Team information
- Current team: Mediaș
- Number: 52

Youth career
- –2019: Gaz Metan Mediaș

Senior career*
Years	Team	Apps	(Gls)
2019–2022	Gaz Metan Mediaș	16	(0)
2022–	Mediaș	50	(14)

International career^{‡}
2018	Romania U16	1	(0)
2019	Romania U17	2	(0)
- * Club domestic league appearances and goals as of 10:24, 8 November 2024 (UTC) ‡ National team caps and goals as of 13:44, 14 June 2021 (UTC)

Eduard Cristian Avram (born 11 March 2003) is a Romanian professional footballer who plays for ACS Mediaș.
