= Lucian Noian =

Romanian footballer

Personal information
- Full name: Gheorghe Lucian Noian
- Date of birth: 26 November 2004 (age 21)
- Place of birth: Mediaș, Romania
- Position: Forward

Team information
- Current team: Mediaș
- Number: 9

Youth career
- –2022: Gaz Metan Mediaș

Senior career*
Years	Team	Apps	(Gls)
2022	Gaz Metan Mediaș	10	(0)
2022–2023	Mediaș	14	(0)
2023	Unirea Ungheni	3	(1)
2024–	Mediaș	11	(5)
- * Club domestic league appearances and goals as of 10:16, 8 November 2024 (UTC)

Gheorghe Lucian Noian (born 26 November 2004) is a Romanian professional footballer who plays as a forward for ACS Mediaș.
