= Radu Zaharia =

Romanian footballer

Personal information
- Full name: Radu Nicolae Zaharia
- Date of birth: 25 January 1989 (age 37)
- Place of birth: Mediaș, Romania
- Height: 1.83 m (6 ft 0 in)
- Position: Defender

Youth career
- 1999–2007: Gaz Metan Mediaș

Senior career*
| Years | Team | Apps | (Gls) |
| 2007–2015 | Gaz Metan Mediaș | 144 | (5) |
| 2015 | Voluntari | 4 | (0) |
| 2016–2017 | Gaz Metan Mediaș | 45 | (3) |
| 2017–2018 | Ermis Aradippou | 23 | (2) |
| 2019 | Unirea Dej | 11 | (2) |

International career
| 2009 | Romania U21 | 2 | (0) |
- * Club domestic league appearances and goals as of 22 March 2020

Radu Nicolae Zaharia (born 25 January 1989) is a Romanian professional footballer who plays as a full back. In the past he also played in Romania for teams such as: Gaz Metan Mediaș or Voluntari and in Cyprus for Ermis Aradippou.
