= 2015 Cupa României final =

- Event: 2014–15 Cupa României
Universitatea Cluj	Steaua București
0	3
- Date: 31 May 2015
- Venue: Arena Națională, Bucharest
- Referee: Alexandru Tudor
- Attendance: 37,764

The Cupa României final was the final match of the 2014–15 Cupa României, played between Universitatea Cluj and Steaua București. Steaua București won the match 3–0.

== Match ==
31 May 2015
21:00 EEST

Universitatea Cluj	0–3	Steaua București
	Report	Popa 9', 53'; Rusescu 49'

Arena Națională, Bucharest
Attendance: 37,764
Referee: Alexandru Tudor (Bucharest)

Universitatea Cluj	Steaua București

GK	33	(Slovakia) Robert Veselovsky
RB	13	(Romania) Raul Ciupe (c)
CB	24	(Romania) Cristian Munteanu
CB	18	(Romania) Ionuț Neag
LB	4	(Croatia) Dino Škvorc	(yellow card) 24'
RM	11	(Uruguay) Pablo Ceppelini		(substituted off) 46'
DM	30	(Romania) Andrei Lungu
DM	27	(Romania) Lóránt Kovács		(substituted off) 67'
LM	17	(Bosnia and Herzegovina) Petar Jovanović	(yellow card) 56'	(substituted off) 56'
FW	24	(Cameroon) Justin Mengolo
FW	7	(Romania) Vlad Morar
Substitutes:
RM	16	(Portugal) Nuno Viveiros		(substituted on) 46'
LM	31	(Burkina Faso) Narcisse Bambara		(substituted on) 56'
MF	10	(Romania) Vasilică Cristocea		(substituted on) 67'
Manager:
(Romania) Adrian Falub

GK	1	(Romania) Florin Niță
RB	6	(Romania) Paul Papp
CB	5	(Romania) Srdjan Luchin	(yellow card) 71'
CB	33	(Cape Verde) Fernando Varela		(substituted off) 77'
LB	16	(Brazil) Guilherme
DM	26	(Romania) Ionuț Neagu		(substituted off) 65'
DM	21	(Netherlands) Nicandro Breeveld
RW	77	(Romania) Adrian Popa		(substituted off) 69'
AM	12	(Romania) Nicolae Stanciu
LW	7	(Romania) Alexandru Chipciu (c)
FW	25	(Romania) Raul Rusescu
Substitutes:
FW	9	(Romania) Gabriel Iancu		(substituted on) 65'
RB	2	(Romania) Cornel Râpă		(substituted on) 69'
CB	30	(Romania) Gabriel Tamaș		(substituted on) 77'
Manager:
(Romania) Constantin Gâlcă

MAN OF THE MATCH

- (Romania) Adrian Popa (Steaua București)

MATCH OFFICIALS

- Assistant referees:
  - Vladimir Urzică
  - Valentin Avram
- Fourth official:
  - Ciprian Danșa
- Additional assistant referees:

MATCH RULES

- 90 minutes.
- 30 minutes of extra-time if necessary.
- Penalty shoot-out if scores still level.
- Seven named substitutes.
- Maximum of three substitutions.

== See also ==
- 2015 Cupa Ligii final
