= 2015 Cupa Ligii final =

- Event: 2014–15 Cupa Ligii
Steaua București	Pandurii Târgu Jiu
3	0
- Date: 20 May 2015
- Venue: Arena Națională, Bucharest
- Referee: Adrian Comănescu
- Attendance: 15,560

The Cupa Ligii final was the final match of the 2014–15 Cupa Ligii, played between Steaua București and Pandurii Târgu Jiu. Steaua București won the match with 3–0.

== Match ==
20 May 2015
20:00 EEST

Steaua București	3 – 0	Pandurii Târgu Jiu
4' (pen.) Iancu; 54' Chipciu; 67' Țucudean	Report

Arena Națională, Bucharest
Attendance: 15,560
Referee: Adrian Comănescu (Romania)

Steaua București	Pandurii Târgu Jiu

GK	1	(Romania) Florin Niță
RB	6	(Romania) Paul Papp
CB	30	(Romania) Gabriel Tamaș
CB	5	(Romania) Srdjan Luchin
LB	14	(Romania) Iasmin Latovlevici
DM	26	(Romania) Ionuț Neagu	(yellow card) 34'
DM	21	(Netherlands) Nicandro Breeveld	(yellow card) 56'
RW	7	(Romania) Alexandru Chipciu (c)
AM	9	(Romania) Gabriel Iancu		(substituted off) 63'
LW	94	(Romania) Rareș Enceanu		(substituted off) 46'
FW	29	(Romania) George Țucudean		(substituted off) 74'
Substitutes:
RW	77	(Romania) Adrian Popa		(substituted on) 46'
FW	25	(Romania) Raul Rusescu		(substituted on) 63'
CB	97	(Romania) Robert Vâlceanu		(substituted on) 74'
Manager:
(Romania) Constantin Gâlcă

GK	80	(Portugal) Pedro Mingote
RB	18	(Romania) Bogdan Ungurușan
CB	3	(Romania) Andrei Cordoș		(substituted off) 19'
CB	6	(Serbia) Nikola Vasiljević
LB	4	(Serbia) Marko Momčilović	(yellow card) 24'
DM	19	(Romania) Paul Anton (c)
DM	24	(Croatia) Filip Mrzljak	(yellow card) 14'	(substituted off) 78'
RW	8	(Romania) Mihai Răduț
AM	10	(Romania) Dan Nistor
LW	26	(Romania) Viorel Nicoară		(substituted off) 68'
FW	99	(Lithuania) Deivydas Matulevičius	(yellow card) 50'
Substitutes:
CB	20	(Romania) Bogdan Șandru		(substituted on) 19'
RW	7	(Romania) Alin Buleică		(substituted on) 68'
AM	11	(Brazil) Eric		(substituted on) 78'
Manager:
(Romania) Eduard Iordănescu

MATCH OFFICIALS

- Assistant referees:
  - Radu Ghinguleac
  - Mircea Grigoriu
- Fourth official:
  - Marcel Bîrsan
- Additional assistant referees:

MATCH RULES

- 90 minutes.
- 30 minutes of extra-time if necessary.
- Penalty shoot-out if scores still level.
- Seven named substitutes.
- Maximum of three substitutions.

== See also ==
- 2015 Cupa României final
