= Ionuț Buzean =

Romanian footballer

Ionuţ Buzean
Personal information
- Full name: Ionuţ Arghir Buzean
- Date of birth: 18 September 1982 (age 44)
- Place of birth: Mediaş, Romania
- Height: 1.83 m (6 ft 0 in)
- Position: Left back

Team information
- Current team: Atletic Păucea (player) / Mediaș (chairman)

Senior career*
Years	Team	Apps	(Gls)
1999–2001	Gaz Metan Mediaş	2	(0)
2001–2003	Petrolul Ploieşti	5	(0)
2003–2017	Gaz Metan Mediaş	294	(5)
2017–2022	Sparta Mediaș	58	(18)
2022	Mediaș	6	(0)
2023–	Atletic Păucea	20	(5)
- * Club domestic league appearances and goals as of 14:55, 13 January 2024 (UTC)

Ionuţ Arghir Buzean (born 18 September 1982) is a Romanian footballer who plays for Liga V side Atletic Păucea. He played almost his entire career for Gaz Metan Mediaş.

== Personal life ==
In June 2012, Ionuț married his longtime girlfriend and fiancé, Romanian professional tennis player Diana Enache.

== Honours ==
Gaz Metan Mediaş

- Liga II: 1999–00, 2015–16

Petrolul Ploieşti

- Liga II: 2002–03
