= Claudiu Boaru =

Romanian footballer

Personal information
- Full name: Claudiu Nicolae Boaru
- Date of birth: 10 April 1977 (age 49)
- Place of birth: Mediaș, Romania
- Height: 1.79 m (5 ft 10 1/2 in)
- Position: Striker

Youth career
- –1997: Sparta Mediaș

Senior career*
Years	Team	Apps	(Gls)
1997–1998	Sparta Mediaș		
1998–2009	Gaz Metan Mediaș	308	(87)

Managerial career
- 2010–2012: Gaz Metan II Mediaș (assistant)
- * Club domestic league appearances and goals as of 13 January 2018

Claudiu Nicolae Boaru (born 10 April 1977) is a retired Romanian footballer who played almost his entire career for Gaz Metan Mediaș. After retirement, Boaru continued to work for Gaz Metan as an assistant coach for the satellite team or sporting manager until the club's dissolution in 2022.

== Career ==
Boaru was born on 10 April 1977 in Mediaș, Romania, and played football only for teams from his town, first with Sparta at junior level and for a short period at the seniors. In 1998 he went to play for Gaz Metan in Divizia B, helping the team earn promotion to Divizia A after 51 years of absence by scoring nine goals in the 1999–2000 season, under the guidance of coach Jean Gavrilă. He made his first league debut on 5 August 2000 in a 3–0 home victory against Ceahlăul Piatra Neamț. Until the end of the season, Boaru made a total of 21 goalless appearances, as the team finished in 16th place and was relegated back to the second league. Boaru stayed with the club in Divizia B for the following seven seasons. He helped them gain another promotion in the 2007–08 season by being the team's top-scorer with a personal record of scoring 20 goals under coach Cristian Pustai, forming a successful offensive trio with Ciprian Prodan and Eric de Oliveira. He started the following season, which would be the last of his career, by scoring a goal and missing a penalty in a 2–2 draw against Oțelul Galați in the first round. He scored another goal in a 5–1 win over Politehnica Timișoara and his last goal in a 1–0 victory against Politehnica Iași. Boaru made his last first league appearance on 30 May 2009 in a 2–0 away loss to Farul Constanța, totaling 315 games played with 108 goals scored in all the competitions for Gaz Metan of which 50 games with three goals are in the first league.

After he retired from playing, Boaru became a football coach, working as an assistant for Gaz Metan's satellite team from 2010 until 2012 when he became the sports director of the club.

== Honours ==
Gaz Metan Mediaș

- Divizia B: 1999–2000
