= Doru Dudiță =

Romanian footballer

Personal information
- Date of birth: 7 September 1977 (age 49)
- Place of birth: Râmnicu Vâlcea, Romania
- Height: 1.72 m (5 ft 7 1/2 in)
- Positions: Left winger; midfielder

Team information
- Current team: Mediaș (assistant)

Youth career
- Acumulatorul București

Senior career*
Years	Team	Apps	(Gls)
2001–2002	FCM Bacău	3	(0)
2002–2004	CS Zlatna	30	(5)
2004	Unirea Alba Iulia	1	(0)
2004–2006	FC Sibiu	22	(5)
2006–2012	Gaz Metan Mediaş	102	(9)
2012	Voința Sibiu	6	(1)
2013	CS Ștefănești		
2013–2014	Măgura Cisnădie		
Total		164	(20)

Managerial career
- 2016–2018: Gaz Metan Mediaș (fitness coach)
- 2022–2023: Mediaș (assistant)
- 2023–: Mediaș (fitness coach)
- * Club domestic league appearances and goals as of 15:03, 13 January 2024 (UTC)

Doru Dudiță (born 7 September 1977) is a retired Romanian footballer, currently a coach. As a player Dudiță played mostly for Gaz Metan Mediaș, with short episodes at FCM Bacău, Unirea Alba Iulia, FC Sibiu, and Voința Sibiu, among others.
