= Adreano van den Driest =

Dutch footballer (born 1992)

Personal information
- Date of birth: 9 January 1992 (age 34)
- Place of birth: Luanda, Angola
- Position: Midfielder

Youth career
- Zeelandia Middelburg
- JVOZ
- 2008–2011: NAC

Senior career*
Years	Team	Apps	(Gls)
2011–2013	NAC	0	(0)
2013–2014	Eindhoven	5	(0)
2015	Académica Coimbra	0	(0)
2015–2016	Académica Lobito		
2017	ENAD Polis Chrysochous		
2017–2018	Achilles Veen		
2018–2019	Dacia Unirea Brăila	27	(1)
- * Club domestic league appearances and goals

Adreano van den Driest (born 9 January 1992) is a Dutch former professional footballer who last played for Dacia Unirea Brăila in Romania.

== Career ==
Born in Angola, Van den Driest grew up in Middelburg and came through the youth systems of Zeelandia Middelburg, JVOZ and NAC Breda. He signed for Eindhoven in June 2013 and made his debut on 2 August 2013 in a 0–0 home draw with VVV-Venlo, coming on for Jasper Waalkens before half-time. He made five league appearances that season.

After a spell with the under-23s of Académica de Coimbra in 2015, Van den Driest had brief stints with Académica do Lobito in Angola and with ENAD Polis Chrysochous in Cyprus, before returning to the Netherlands with Achilles Veen in August 2017.

In September 2018 he joined Romanian second-tier side Dacia Unirea Brăila. He scored his only Liga II goal for the club on 14 October 2018, in a 6–1 defeat away to Universitatea Cluj.
