= Alexandru Coman =

Romanian footballer

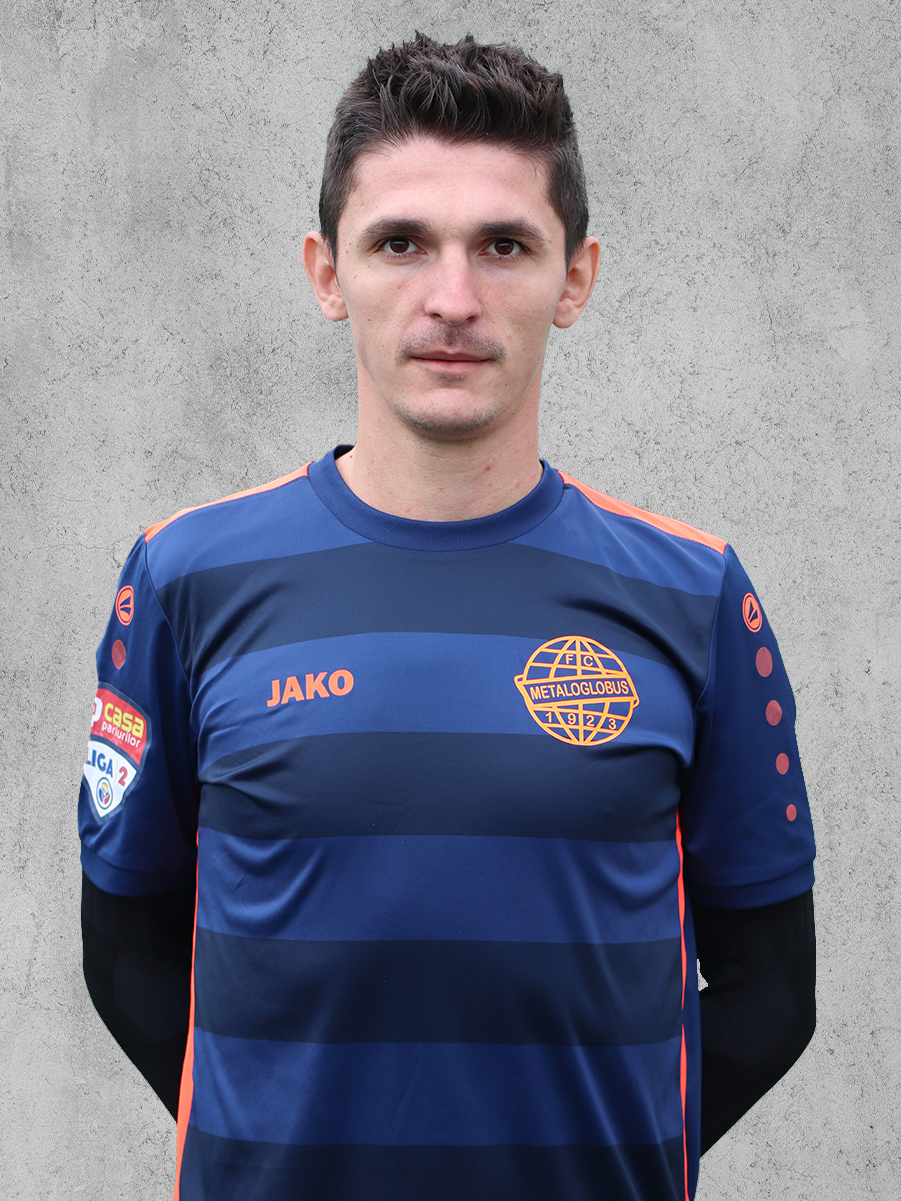

Personal information
- Full name: Alexandru Cătălin Coman
- Date of birth: 16 October 1991 (age 35)
- Place of birth: Bucharest, Romania
- Height: 1.79 m (5 ft 10 in)
- Position: Right back

Team information
- Current team: Vedița Colonești
- Number: 17

Youth career
- 1998–2010: Rapid București

Senior career*
Years	Team	Apps	(Gls)
2010–2014	Rapid București	68	(6)
2011	→ Juventus București (loan)	14	(0)
2011–2012	→ ALRO Slatina (loan)	17	(1)
2015	Petrolul Ploiești	7	(0)
2015	Ethnikos Achna	1	(0)
2016	Brașov	16	(2)
2016–2017	Voluntari	15	(0)
2017	Balotești	18	(1)
2018	Hermannstadt	18	(0)
2018–2019	Universitatea Cluj	29	(3)
2019–2022	Metaloglobus București	55	(3)
2022–	Vedița Colonești	12	(1)

International career
2011–2012	Romania U-21	3	(0)
- * Club domestic league appearances and goals as of 08:05, 21 June 2022 (UTC)

Alexandru Cătălin Coman (born 16 October 1991) is a Romanian footballer who plays as a right back for Vedița Colonești.

== Honours ==
FC Voluntari

- Romanian Cup : 2016–17

== Gallery ==
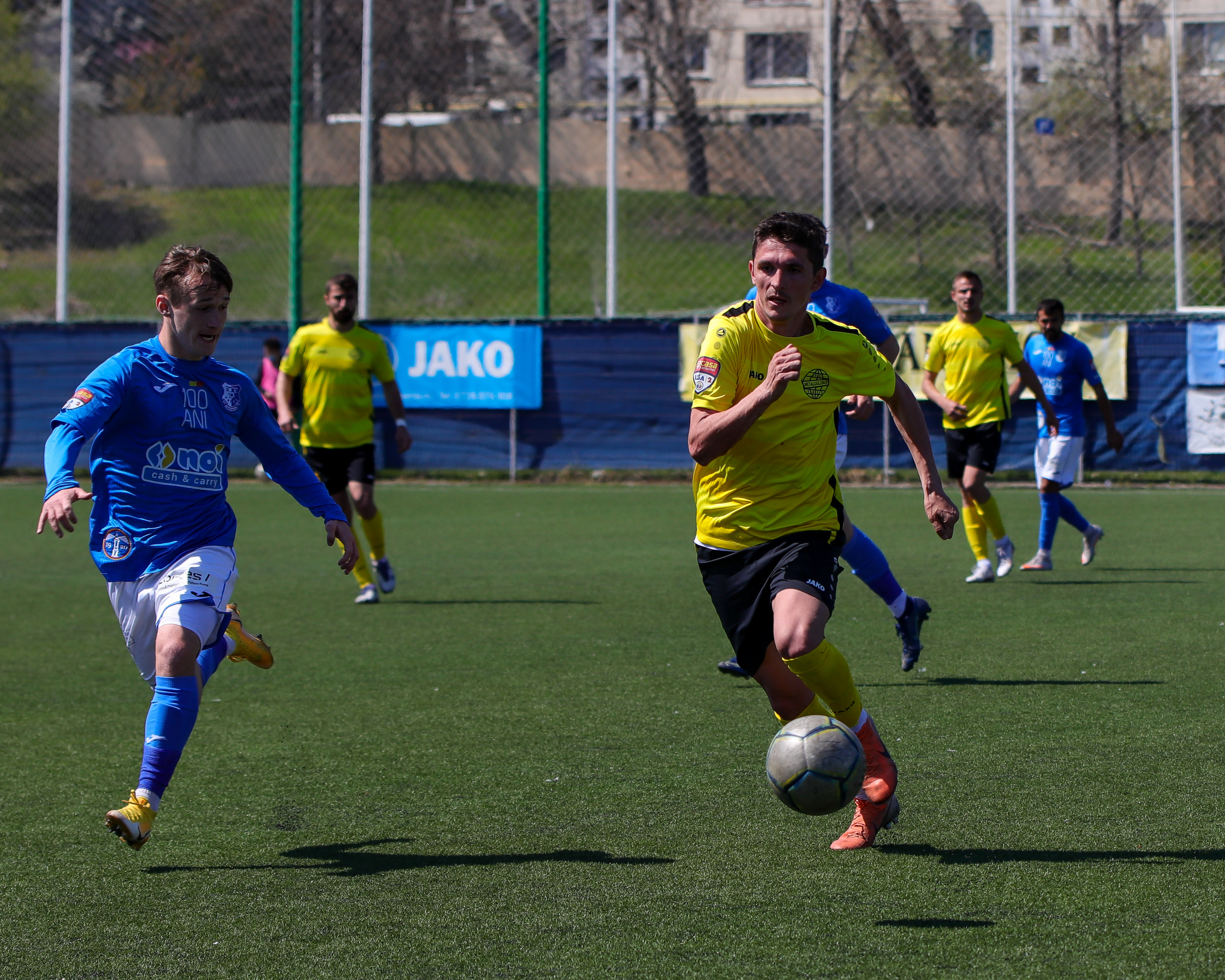

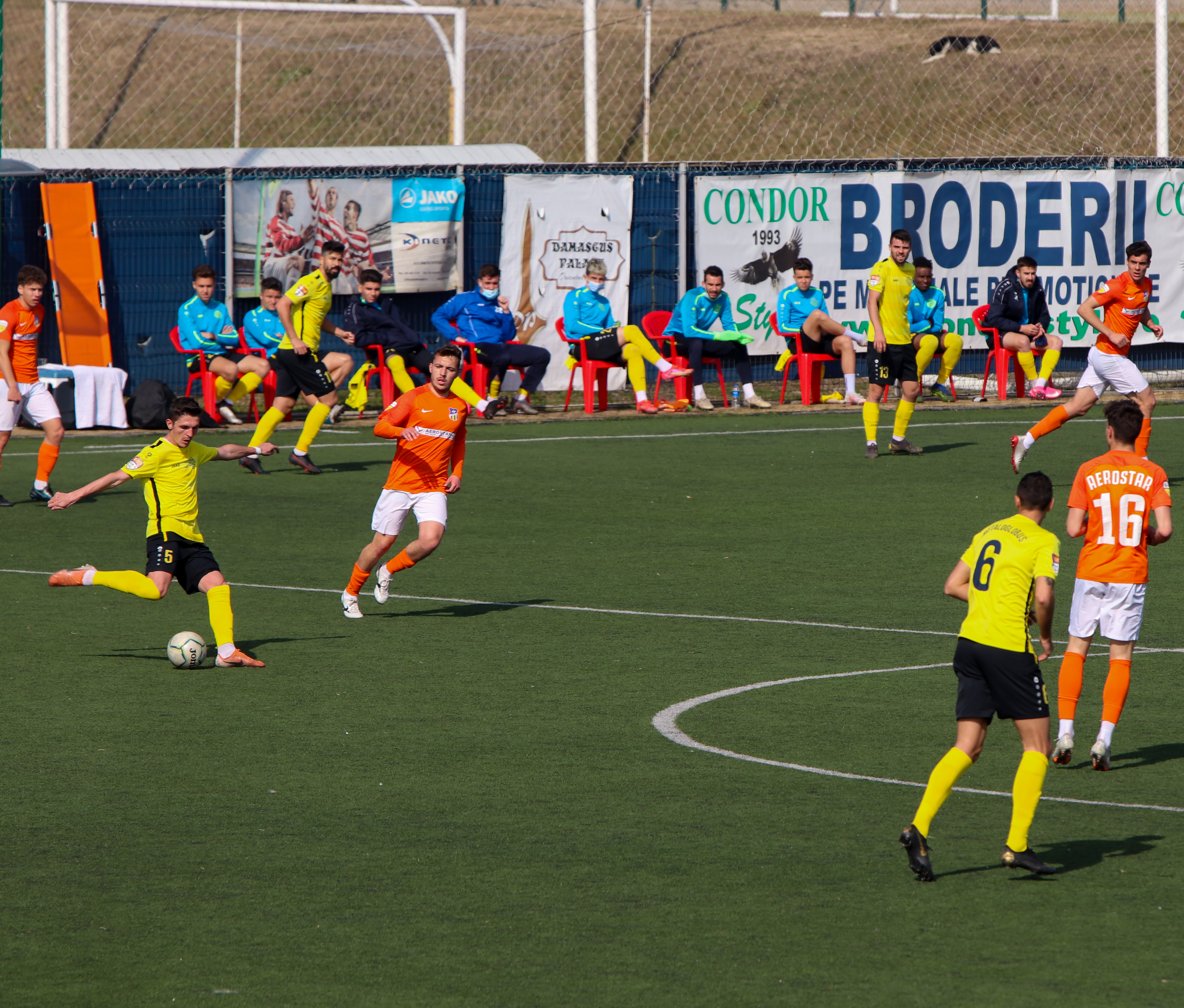

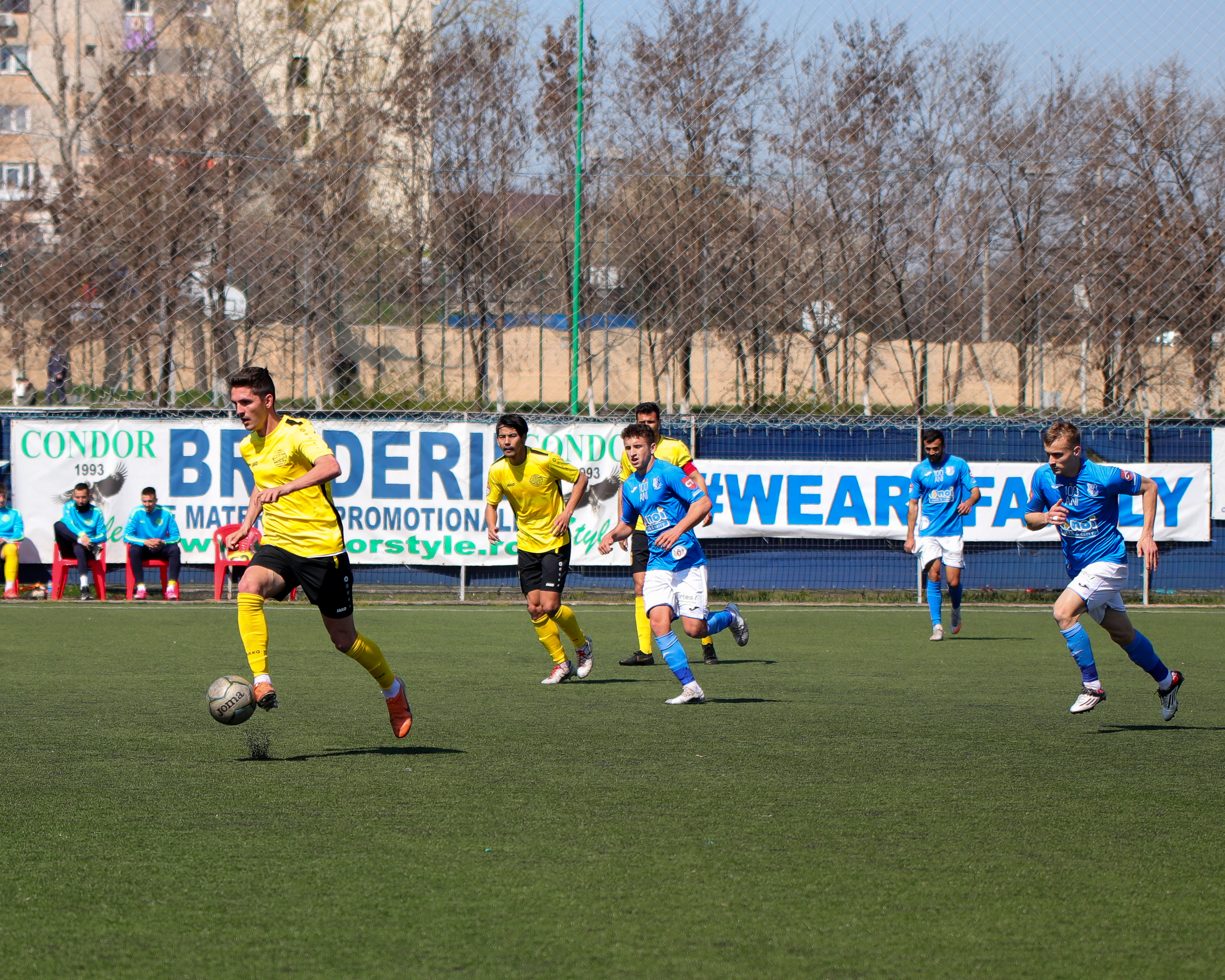

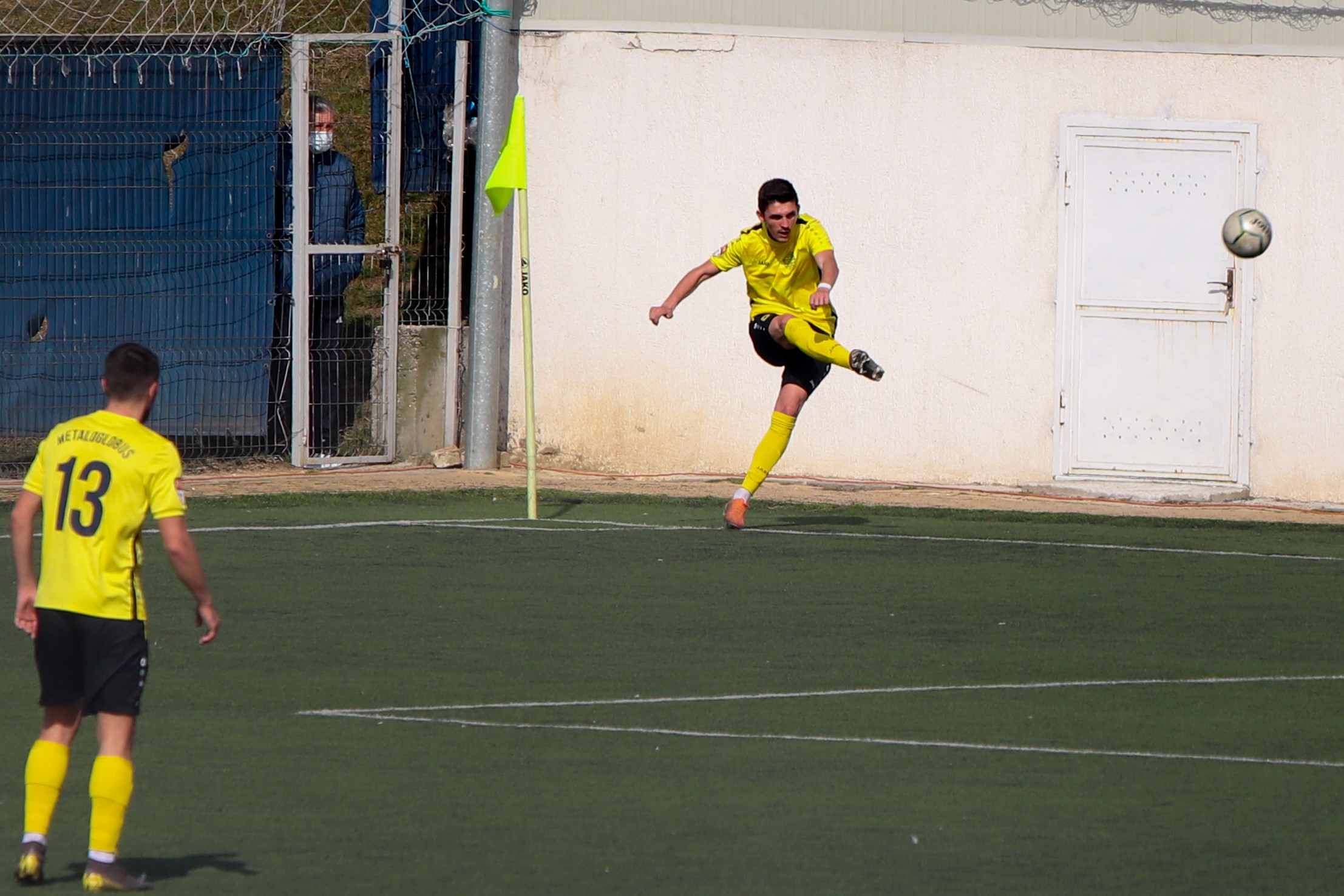

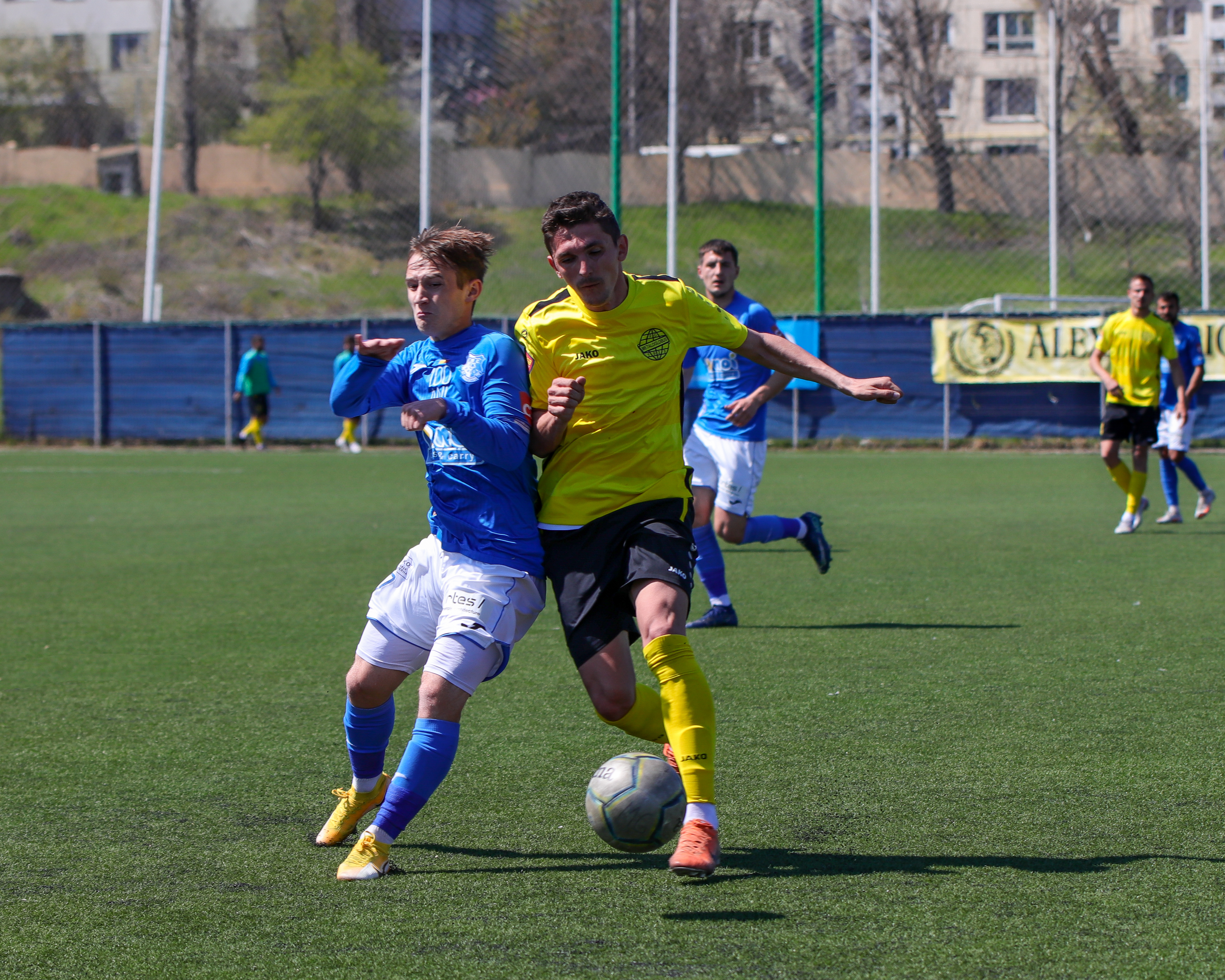
