= Andrea Venturini =

Italian footballer (born 1996)

Personal information
- Date of birth: 15 August 1996 (age 30)
- Place of birth: Cesena, Italy
- Height: 1.80 m (5 ft 11 in)
- Position: Centre back

Team information
- Current team: Pistoiese

Youth career
- –2013: Santarcangelo
- 2013–2016: Cesena

Senior career*
Years	Team	Apps	(Gls)
2015–2016	Cesena	0	(0)
2015–2016	→ Santarcangelo (loan)	0	(0)
2016	→ Romagna Centro (loan)	14	(0)
2016–2018	Ravenna	66	(2)
2018–2019	Rimini	32	(1)
2019–2020	Mantova	15	(0)
2020–2022	Fidelis Andria	27	(2)
2022	Pistoiese	13	(0)
2022–2024	Alcione	64	(1)
2024–2025	Ravenna	28	(1)
2025–	Pistoiese	0	(0)
- * Club domestic league appearances and goals as of 4 May 2025

Andrea Venturini (born 15 August 1996) is an Italian professional footballer who plays as a centre back for Serie D club Pistoiese.

== Club career ==
Born in Cesena, Venturini started his career in local clubs Santarcangelo and A.C. Cesena. In 2016, he was loaned to Romagna Centro, on this team Venturini made his senior debut in Serie D.

On 22 June 2016, he joined to Serie D club Ravenna. The team won the promotion to Serie C this season, winning the Group D. Venturini made his professional debut on 27 August 2017 against Fermana.

On 4 July 2018, he signed with Serie C club Rimini.

After one season, he returned to Serie D and joined to Mantova.

For the 2020–21 season, he moved to Fidelis Andria. Fidelis won the promotion by repechage, and Venturini returned to Serie C.

On 31 January 2022, he signed with Pistoiese at winter market.
