= Doru Dumitrescu =

Romanian professional footballer

Personal information
- Full name: Doru Adrian Dumitrescu
- Date of birth: 25 May 1998 (age 28)
- Place of birth: Drăgănești, Romania
- Height: 1.89 m (6 ft 2 in)
- Position: Midfielder

Youth career
- –2015: Gh. Hagi Academy

Senior career*
Years	Team	Apps	(Gls)
2015–2021	Viitorul Constanța	17	(0)
2018–2019	→ Universitatea Cluj (loan)	11	(1)
Total		28	(1)

International career^{‡}
2018	Romania U21	1	(0)
- * Club domestic league appearances and goals as of 1 June 2019 ‡ National team caps and goals as of 24 March 2018

Doru Adrian Dumitrescu (born 25 May 1998) is a Romanian former professional footballer who played as a midfielder for Viitorul Constanța and Universitatea Cluj. He decided to end his career in April 2021 at age 23 because of injuries. He played his last official match, for U Cluj, in 2019.

== Honours ==
Viitorul Constanța

- Liga I: 2016–17
