= Cristian Gavra =

Romanian footballer

Personal information
- Date of birth: 3 April 1993 (age 33)
- Place of birth: Arad, Romania
- Height: 1.87 m (6 ft 2 in)
- Position: Striker

Team information
- Current team: Gloria LT Cermei
- Number: 9

Youth career
- 2000–2007: Gloria Arad
- 2007–2009: FC Sînleani
- 2009–2010: Gheorghe Hagi Academy

Senior career*
Years	Team	Apps	(Gls)
2010–2018	Viitorul Constanța	81	(3)
2016–2017	→ Gaz Metan Mediaș (loan)	26	(10)
2018–2021	Universitatea Cluj	76	(28)
2021–2022	Academica Clinceni	12	(0)
2022–2023	Ripensia Timișoara	19	(3)
2023	ASU Politehnica Timișoara	9	(0)
2023–2024	Șoimii Lipova	13	(5)
2024	Dumbrăvița	7	(0)
2024–	Gloria LT Cermei	9	(1)

International career
2009–2010	Romania U17	6	(2)
2011–2012	Romania U19	8	(5)
2013–2014	Romania U21	8	(2)
- * Club domestic league appearances and goals as of 13 April 2024

Cristian Gavra (born 3 April 1993) is a Romanian professional footballer who plays as a striker for Liga III club Gloria Lunca-Teuz Cermei.

== International career ==
Gavra played with the Romania U-19 national team at the 2011 European Under-19 Championship, which took place in Romania.

== Honours ==
Viitorul Constanța

- Liga III: 2009–10
- Supercupa României runner-up: 2017

Gaz Metan Mediaș

- Liga II: 2015–16
