= Grillo Edson =

Brazilian footballer (born 1982)

Personal information
- Full name: Edson Aparecido Martins dos Santos
- Date of birth: August 1, 1982 (age 44)
- Place of birth: Presidente Prudente, Brazil
- Height: 1.72 m (5 ft 8 in)
- Position: Right wing

Youth career
- 1999–2004: Clube Atlético Paranaense

Senior career*
Years	Team	Apps	(Gls)
2005	Roma PR		
2006	União Bandeirante FC		
2006	Guarani		
2006	Comercial FC		
2007	Guarani	18	(1)
2007	CA Metropolitano	4	(0)
2007–2009	Gaz Metan Mediaş	23	(3)
2009–2010	Arapongas		
2010–2013	Operário Ferroviário		
2013	Maringá		
2014	Prudentópolis		
2015	Toledo		
- * Club domestic league appearances and goals

Edson Aparecido Martins dos Santos (born August 1, 1982), known as Grillo Edson, is a Brazilian former football player.
