= Iuliu Hațiegan =

Romanian association football (soccer) player

Personal information
- Full name: Iuliu Andrei Hațiegan
- Date of birth: 4 April 1998 (age 28)
- Place of birth: Cluj-Napoca, Romania
- Position: Forward

Youth career
- 2008–2016: Universitatea Cluj

Senior career*
Years	Team	Apps	(Gls)
2016–2019	Universitatea Cluj	72	(30)
2019	Politehnica Iași	8	(0)
2020	SCM Zalău	0	(0)
2020–2021	Minaur Baia Mare	12	(2)
2022	SCM Zalău	7	(4)
- * Club domestic league appearances and goals as of 08:49, 21 June 2022 (UTC)

Iuliu Andrei Hațiegan (born 4 April 1998) is a Romanian professional footballer who plays as a forward.

== Personal life ==
He is a descendant of doctor Iuliu Hațieganu, the founder of Universitatea Cluj, the club where he started his career. He also sustains to be related to Zoltán Ivansuc, a former player of Universitatea Cluj.

== Honours ==
Universitatea Cluj

- Liga III: 2017–18
- Liga IV: 2016–17

Minaur Baia Mare

- Liga III: 2020–21
