= Octavian Ursu (footballer) =

Romanian footballer

Personal information
- Full name: Octavian Andrei Ursu
- Date of birth: 15 November 1994 (age 31)
- Place of birth: Mediaș, Romania
- Height: 1.76 m (5 ft 9 in)
- Position: Forward

Team information
- Current team: Mediaș
- Number: 7

Youth career
- –2010: Ardealul Cluj
- 2010–2013: Universitatea Cluj

Senior career*
Years	Team	Apps	(Gls)
2013–2016	Universitatea Cluj	28	(8)
2014	→ Unirea Slobozia (loan)	17	(2)
2014	→ Berceni (loan)	7	(1)
2015	→ Mioveni (loan)	5	(0)
2016	ASA Târgu Mureș	4	(0)
2017	Olimpia Satu Mare	9	(1)
2017–2019	Universitatea Cluj	36	(19)
2019	→ Politehnica Timișoara (loan)	13	(5)
2019–2020	UTA Arad	36	(8)
2021	Rapid București	14	(1)
2021–2022	ASU Politehnica Timișoara	25	(5)
2022	1599 Șelimbăr	16	(4)
2023	Oțelul Galați	14	(3)
2023–2024	Chindia Târgoviște	9	(0)
2024–	Mediaș	25	(6)
- * Club domestic league appearances and goals as of 10:10, 8 November 2024 (UTC)

Octavian Ursu (born 15 November 1994) is a Romanian professional footballer who plays as a forward for Liga III club ACS Mediaș.

== Honours ==
Universitatea Cluj

- Liga III: 2017–18

UTA Arad

- Liga II: 2019–20
