= Rareș Takács =

Romanian footballer

Personal information
- Full name: Rareș Takács
- Date of birth: 10 December 1991 (age 34)
- Place of birth: Turda, Romania
- Height: 1.77 m (5 ft 10 in)
- Position: Defender

Youth career
- –2007: Arieșul Turda
- 2007–2010: Ardealul Cluj
- 2010: Universitatea Cluj

Senior career*
Years	Team	Apps	(Gls)
2010–2015	Universitatea Cluj	19	(0)
2010–2011	→ Arieșul Turda (loan)	1	(0)
2012	→ CS Ștefănești (loan)	?	(?)
2012	→ FCM Reșița (loan)	?	(?)
2015–2016	Olimpia Satu Mare	22	(3)
2017–2020	Universitatea Cluj	58	(14)
2020–2023	FK Csíkszereda	52	(1)
- * Club domestic league appearances and goals as of 3 December 2022

Rareș Takács (born 10 December 1991) is a Romanian professional football player who plays as a defender.

== Career ==
Born in Turda, Romania, Takács started playing football in his hometown as a youngster for Arieșul Turda. Later he moved to Cluj-Napoca at Ardealul Cluj and in 2010 he joined Universitatea Cluj together with other teammates. In 2012, he was loaned to the lower division teams CS Ștefănești and FCM Reșița but at the end of the year, he returned to Universitatea Cluj.

Takács made his debut in Liga I in May 2013, in a match that was lost by Universitatea Cluj in front of CFR Cluj.

== Honours ==
Universitatea Cluj

- Liga III: 2017–18
