= Răzvan Greu =

Romanian footballer

Personal information
- Full name: Răzvan Lucian Greu
- Date of birth: 16 March 1995 (age 31)
- Place of birth: Târgu Mureș, Romania
- Height: 1.82 m (6 ft 0 in)
- Position: Midfielder

Team information
- Current team: Mediaș
- Number: 23

Youth career
- –2010: ACS Kinder Sîngeorgiu de Mureş
- 2010–2011: Ardealul Cluj
- 2011–2014: Universitatea Cluj

Senior career*
Years	Team	Apps	(Gls)
2014–2016	Universitatea Cluj	27	(3)
2014	→ Mioveni (loan)	0	(0)
2015	→ Sighetu Marmației (loan)	10	(1)
2016–2017	Botoșani	7	(0)
2017	→ Sepsi OSK (loan)	14	(2)
2017–2019	Universitatea Cluj	40	(3)
2019–2021	Farul Constanța	38	(1)
2021–2022	Unirea Slobozia	23	(3)
2022	Unirea Dej	14	(1)
2023	Gloria Buzău	11	(0)
2023–2024	MSE Târgu Mureș	24	(11)
2024–	Mediaș	0	(0)
- * Club domestic league appearances and goals as of 10:21, 8 November 2024 (UTC)

Răzvan Lucian Greu (born 16 March 1995) is a Romanian professional footballer who plays as a midfielder for Liga III club ACS Mediaș . In his career, Greu also played for Universitatea Cluj, Sepsi OSK Sfântu Gheorghe or Farul Constanța, among others.

== Honours ==
Universitatea Cluj

- Liga III: 2017–18
