= CS Gaz Metan Mediaș =

Association football club in Mediaș

Gaz Metan Mediaș
- Full name: Clubul Sportiv Gaz Metan Mediaș
- Nicknames: Lupii negri (The Black Wolves); Gaziștii (The Refinery Workers); Alb-negrii (The White-Blacks)
- Short name: Gaz Metan
- Founded: 1945; 81 years ago (as Karres Mediaș)
- Dissolved: 2022; 4 years ago
- Ground: Gaz Metan
- Capacity: 7,814
Home colours	Away colours	Third colours

Chart of Gaz Metan Mediaș's yearly table positions in the Romanian Football League from 1947 to the present

Clubul Sportiv Gaz Metan Mediaș (Romanian pronunciation: [ˌklubul sporˈtiv ˈgaz meˈtan ˈmedi.aʃ]), commonly known as Gaz Metan Mediaș or simply as Gaz Metan, was a Romanian professional football club based in Mediaș, Sibiu County.

Founded in 1945 as Karres Mediaș, the team spent most of its existence in the second division. It also participated in 16 seasons of the Liga I, the highest level of the Romanian league system, and lost a Cupa României final to CCA București in 1951. Gaz Metan registered its debut in European competitions in the 2011–12 campaign, when it defeated KuPS and Mainz 05 prior to being eliminated by Austria Wien in the UEFA Europa League play-off round.

After the dissolution of the club in 2022, some of its former players and coaches founded ACS Mediaș 2022, which has the purpose of continuing the football tradition in the town.

== History ==
=== Early years (1945–1950) ===
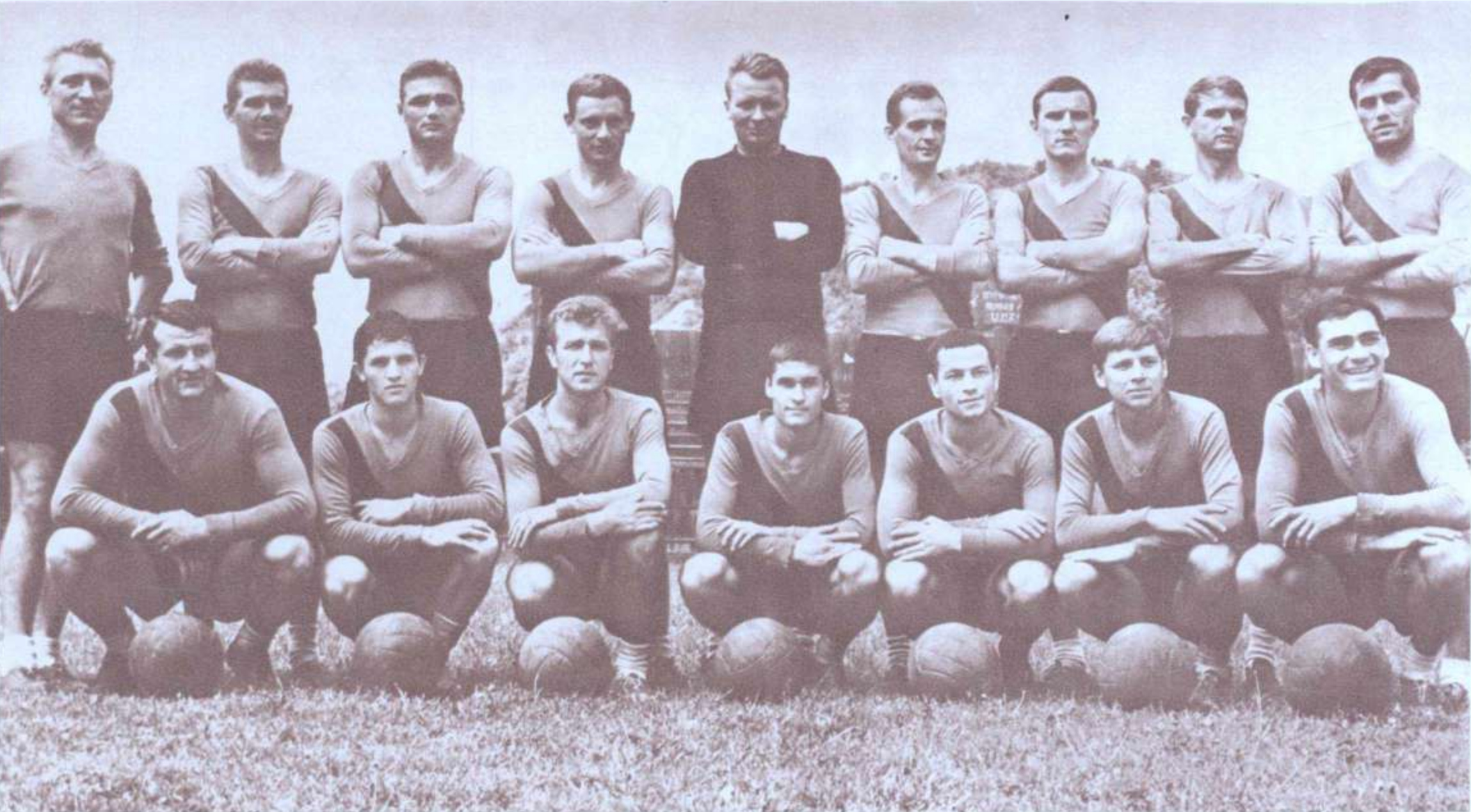
Gaz Metan squad in 1967

The club was founded in 1945 as Karres Mediaș, and played in the Romanian Second League (Liga II). It was promoted to Divizia A in 1947, when its name was changed to CSM Mediaș. The team finished in 11th place out of 16 teams. Financial troubles and poor training conditions plagued its second Liga I season (1948–1949). After the second round, disgruntled players complained to the press and the Romanian Football Federation (FRF) about the club's poor training conditions. The FRF allow the Zorile Roșii (Red Dawn) factory to assume ownership of the club, whose name was changed to Zorile Roșii Mediaș. Later that season, the team merged with Vitrometan Mediaș. The second half of the season brought another change in ownership, when it was taken over by Ateliere Gaz Metan and its name was changed to Gaz Metan Mediaș. The team was relegated to Liga II that season. The 1948–49 team was anchored by Kodacek – Sulyak, Szobo – Șerban, Molnar, Rășinaru – Pop, Coman, Guța, Szabo, and Pologea.

=== Respected second-league team (1950–1999) ===
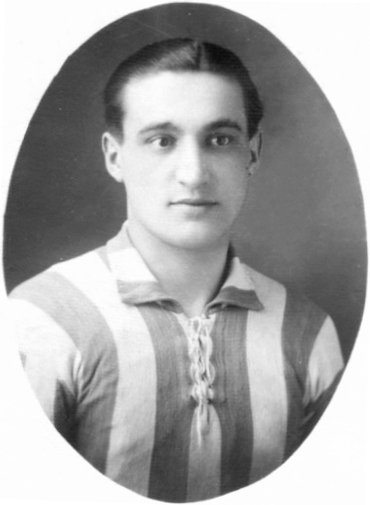
Ștefan Dobay as a player during the 1930s; he coached the club to the 1951 Romanian Cup final.

The club's name changed frequently, and it played in the Romanian Cup final. It was known as Partizanul (1950–51), Flacara (1951–56), Energia (1956–58), Gaz Metan (1958–60), and CSM Mediaș (1960–1963). The club changed its name for the last time in 1963, returning to Gaz Metan Mediaș. In 1951, it reached the final stage of the Romanian Cup as a Divizia B team. Coached by Ștefan Dobay, Flacăra lost 3–1 in overtime to CCA București (the present-day Steaua București). Its lone goal was scored by Coman in the 71st minute, and the team consisted of Varaday – Luca, Szabo – Dumitrescu, Molnar I, Costea – Pop, Papay, Coman, Szasz, and Moldovan. Gaz Metan played primarily in Divizia B, occupying mid-rank positions until 1972 when it was relegated for the first time to Divizia C. It was promoted back to Divizia B until 1976, when it was again relegated to Divizia C. The club was promoted to Divizia B the following year, where it remained until 1992: 1977–78 (eighth place), 1978–79 (ninth), 1979–80 (11th), 1980–81 (seventh), 1981–82 (sixth), 1982–83 (eighth), 1983–84 (fifth), 1984–85 (sixth), 1985–86 (fifth), 1986–87 (seventh), 1987–88 (10th), 1988–89 (11th), 1989–90 (10th), 1990–91 (11th) and 1991–92 (14th). At the end of the 1991–92 Divizia B season, the gaziștii were relegated to Divizia C for the third time. The Transylvanian team was promoted after one year by winning the third series of the third league, five points ahead of second-place Petrolul Stoina from Gorj County.

Returned to a Divizia B, Gaz Metan finished seventh place in the first season, 11th in the second, and fourth at the end of the 1995–96 season (the club's best finish in the previous 20 years). The following season, Gaz Metan finished third and entertained serious intentions of returning to the first league of Romanian football. That season was followed by two harder ones, in which the club finished fifth and fourth.

=== Revival (2000–2014) ===
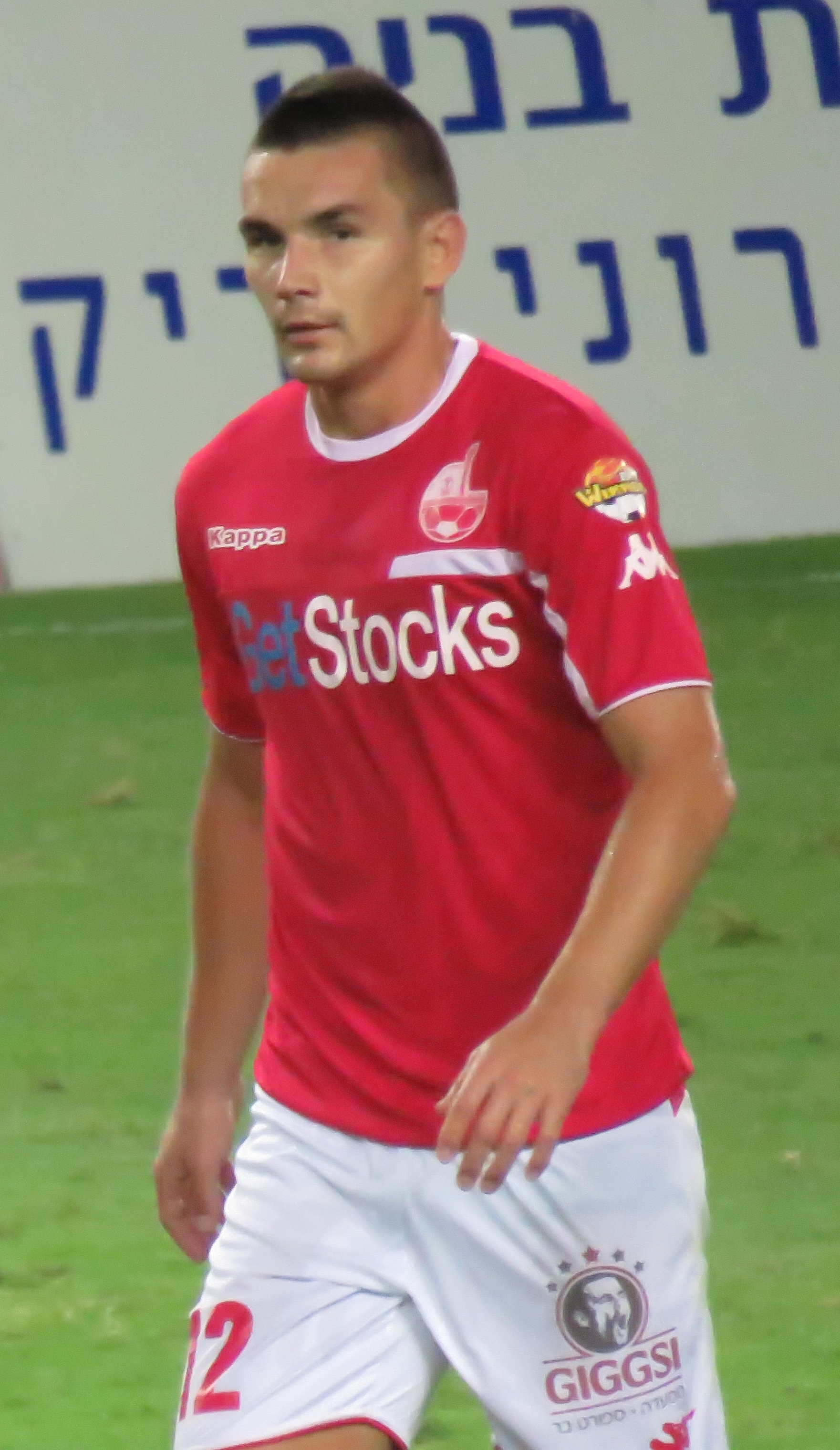
Ovidiu Hoban (pictured in 2015) was one of the club's stars from 2005 to 2011.

Gaz Metan's 2011–12 squad

The club was promoted to Divizia A in 2000, 51 years after its last appearance in the first league. Coached by Jean Gavrilă, Gaz Metan won promotion by winning the second group of the 1999–2000 Divizia B, 11 points ahead of second-place ARO Câmpulung. The team was composed of GK: Filip, Roșca – DF: Ciurar, Grigore, Grasu, Lungu, Șomfălean, Vasile -MF: Zotincă, Boroncoi, Callo, Hanc, Ioan, Moldovan, Pătru, Stoica – FW: Vitan, Boloban, Boaru, Găldean. However, the gaziștii finished 16th and last place with three victories, nine draws and 18 losses; 21 goals scored and 42 conceded for a total of 18 points, 16 less than 15th-place Rocar București.

The 2001–02 season found the team back in the second league, finishing 12th. At the start of the 2002–03 season, the club was fighting for promotion and finished third behind Apulum Alba Iulia and FC Oradea. In 2003–04 they finished fourth, second in 2004–05, fourth in 2005–06, and sixth in 2006–07. The club missed promotion in 2005 after finishing with the same number of points (65) as Jiul Petroșani.

In 2008, coached by former Gaz Metan player Cristian Pustai, the team was again promoted to Liga I: Ștețca – Grillo, Lazăr, Zaharia, Buzean – Dudiță, Eric, Hoban, Curtean – Boaru, C.Prodan. They finished 15th out of 18 teams in the 2008–09 season. After the corruption scandal involving FC Argeș Pitești and the team's relegation from Liga II, Gaz Metan remained in the first league. They finished 10th in 2009–10, for a record three consecutive seasons in Liga I.

The white-and-blacks finished seventh in 2010–11, secured their first UEFA Europa League berth. Gaz Metan reached the 2011–12 UEFA Europa League play-off round, eliminating KuPS of Finland in the second round and Mainz of Germany in the third round before losing in the playoffs to Austria Wien. They reached the Romanian Cup semi-finals in 2011–12 before being eliminated by future cup winner Dinamo București, finishing in 13th place. The team finished 10th in 2012–13, and 13th in 2013–14.

=== Difficult times (2014–16) ===
Liga I reduced its number of teams for the 2014–15 season from 18 to 14, with six teams relegated. The lupii negri finished in 13th place, and returned to Liga II after seven consecutive years in the first league – the club's longest run, with its best performance (seventh place) and its first participation in European competitions.

=== Best position and play-off, collapse and dissolution (2016–22) ===
Gaz Metan was again promoted after one season in the second league. The 2015–16 team consisted of Greab – Romeo, Cristea, Zaharia, Buzean – P.Iacob, Danci – Munteanu, Bic, and Petre – Gavra. The 2016–17 season was tumultuous for the team from Mediaș. It finished the regular season in seventh place (two points from a play-off slot) and qualified for the play-out round, when it finished in second place and eighth in the general ranking. The club also experienced serious financial problems, and chose bankruptcy.

During the summer of 2017, the club adopted a low-budget strategy. After 22 games in the 2017–18 season the club finished in 12th place, just above the relegation zone. Coached by Edward Iordănescu, Gaz Metan had its best finish in the 2019–20 season – making the playoffs and finishing in sixth place. The 2020–21 season saw a change of club presidency, staff and player changes, and a team finish in the bottom half of the table. The 2021–22 season was the club's last. With large debts to former employees and poor management, the team lost points several times and finished the season with negative 38 points.

== Stadium ==
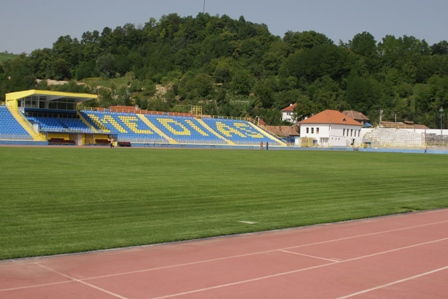
Gaz Metan Stadium before renovation and expansion.

Gaz Metan plays its home games at the Municipal Gaz Metan Stadium. The stadium has a capacity of 8000 seats with half of the seats covered; playing surface with under-soil heating and a 1500 lux floodlights system. The stadium is homologated to host preliminary rounds of any UEFA club competitions as well as U21 international games.

The stadium underwent major renovations and expansions in 2010. The playing surface was replaced in its entirety and covered stands were built on the opposite side of the main stands, increasing the stadium's capacity to 7,814 seats.

== Support ==
Gaz Metan has many supporters in Mediaș and especially in Sibiu County. The ultras groups of Gaz Metan Mediaș are known as Lupii Negri (The Black Wolves) and Commando Mediensis.

=== Rivalries ===
The most important rivalries overtime for Gaz Metan were against football clubs from Sibiu whether they were: Șoimii Sibiu, Inter Sibiu, FC Sibiu or Voința Sibiu. Now the team that represents Sibiu is FC Hermannstadt and the two clubs met for the first time on 17 April 2018, in a Romanian Cup semi-final, in front of many fans.

== Honours ==
=== League ===
- Liga II
  - Winners (2): 1999–2000, 2015–16
  - Runners-up (5): 1946–47, 1952, 1954, 2004–05, 2007–08
- Liga III
  - Winners (3): 1972–73, 1976–77, 1992–93

=== Cups ===
- Cupa României
  - Runners-up (1): 1951

== European record ==
The club has only played in the qualifiers of one UEFA Europa League season thus far, as showcased in the table below.

Notes for the abbreviations in the tables below:

- 2QR: Second qualifying round
- 3QR: Third qualifying round
- PO: Play-off round

Season	Round	Opponent	Home	Away	Aggregate
2011–12	2QR	(Finland) KuPS	2–0	0–1	2–1
2011–12	3QR	(Germany) Mainz 05	1–1 (a.e.t.)	1–1	2–2 (4–3 p)
2011–12	PO	Austria Wien	1–0	1–3	2–3

== League history ==
Season	Tier	Division	Place	Cupa României
2021–22	1	Liga I	16th (R)	Round of 16
2020–21	1	Liga I	9th	Round of 16
2019–20	1	Liga I	6th	Round of 32
2018–19	1	Liga I	7th	Round of 16
2017–18	1	Liga I	10th	Semi-finals
2016–17	1	Liga I	8th	Round of 16
2015–16	2	Liga II (Seria II)	1st (C, P)	
2014–15	1	Liga I	13th (R)	Round of 32
2013–14	1	Liga I	13th	Round of 16
2012–13	1	Liga I	10th	Round of 16
2011–12	1	Liga I	13th	Semi-finals
2010–11	1	Liga I	7th	Round of 32
2009–10	1	Liga I	10th	Round of 16
2008–09	1	Liga I	15th	Round of 32
2007–08	2	Liga II (Seria II)	2nd (P)	
2006–07	2	Liga II (Seria II)	6th	
2005–06	2	Divizia B (Seria III)	4th	Round of 32

Season	Tier	Division	Place	Cupa României
2004–05	2	Divizia B (Seria III)	2nd	Round of 16
2003–04	2	Divizia B (Seria III)	4th	Round of 32
2002–03	2	Divizia B (Seria II)	3rd	
2001–02	2	Divizia B (Seria II)	12th	
2000–01	1	Divizia A	16th (R)	Round of 32
1999–00	2	Divizia B (Seria II)	1st (C, P)	
1998–99	2	Divizia B (Seria II)	4th	
1997–98	2	Divizia B (Seria II)	5th	Round of 16
1996–97	2	Divizia B (Seria II)	3rd	
1995–96	2	Divizia B (Seria II)	4th	Round of 16
1994–95	2	Divizia B (Seria II)	11th	
1993–94	2	Divizia B (Seria II)	7th	
1992–93	3	Divizia C (Seria III)	1st (C, P)	
1991–92	2	Divizia B (Seria II)	14th (R)	Round of 32
1990–91	2	Divizia B (Seria II)	11th	
1989–90	2	Divizia B (Seria II)	10th	

== Notable former players ==
The footballers enlisted below have had international cap(s) for their respective countries at junior and/or senior level and/or more than 100 caps for CS Gaz Metan Mediaș.

- (Romania) Mircea Axente
- (Romania) Ovidiu Bic
- (Romania) Sergiu Buș
- (Romania) Claudiu Boaru
- (Romania) Florin Bratu
- (Romania) Cristian Bud
- (Romania) Ionuț Buzean
- (Romania) Marius Constantin
- (Romania) Valentin Crețu
- (Romania) Iulian Cristea
- (Romania) Alexandru Curtean
- (Romania) Doru Dudiță
- (Romania) Ovidiu Hoban
- (Romania) Ionuț Larie
- (Romania) Florin Lazăr
- (Romania) Casian Miclăuș
- (Romania) Alexandru Munteanu
- (Romania) Sergiu Muth
- (Romania) Darius Olaru
- (Romania) Ciprian Petre
- (Romania) Paul Pîrvulescu
- (Romania) Răzvan Pleșca
- (Romania) Flavius Șomfălean
- (Romania) Cristian Todea
- (Romania) Gheorghe Váczi
- (Romania) Radu Zaharia
- (Romania) Alex Zotincă

Albania

- (Albania) Azdren Llullaku

Algeria

- (Algeria) Aymen Tahar

Argentina

- (Argentina) Patricio Matricardi
- (Argentina) Julián Velázquez

Brazil

- (Brazil) Eric Pereira

Bulgaria

- (Bulgaria) Antoni Ivanov

Cameroon

- (Cameroon) Nana Falemi

Cape Verde

- (Cape Verde) Ely Fernandes

Croatia

- (Croatia) Dario Rugašević

Czech Republic

- (Czech Republic) Miloš Buchta

Georgia

- (Georgia (country)) Akaki Khubutia

Greece

- (Greece) Kostas Choumis

Guinea

- (Guinea) Boubacar Fofana

Italy

- (Italy) Nicolao Dumitru
- (Italy) Roberto Romeo

Jordan

- (Jordan) Tha'er Bawab

Portugal

- (Portugal) David Caiado
- (Portugal) Carlos Fortes

Serbia

- (Serbia) Žarko Marković
- (Serbia) Jasmin Trtovac

Slovakia

- (Slovakia) Michal Kubala

Suriname

- (Suriname) Nicandro Breeveld

Venezuela

- (Venezuela) Mario Rondón

== Former managers ==
- (Romania) Ștefan Dobay (1947–1948)
- (Romania) Ferenc Rónay (1948–1949)
- (Romania) Ștefan Dobay (1951)
- (Romania) Nicolae Kovács (1953–1954)
- (Romania) Gheorghe Váczi (1959–1960)
- (Romania) Petre Rădulescu (1963–1965)
- (Romania) Vasile Copil (1980–1983)
- (Romania) Florea Ispir (1995–1996)
- (Romania) Silviu Dumitrescu (2000–2001)
- (Romania) Ioan Sabău (2003–2005)
- (Romania) Cristian Pustai (2007–2013)
- (Romania) Gheorghe Mulțescu (2013)
- (Romania) Cristian Dulca (2013–2014)
- (Romania) Dănuț Matei ( 2014 - 2015)
- (Romania) Leontin Grozavu (2015–2016)
- (Romania) Cristian Pustai (2016–2018)
- (Romania) Edward Iordănescu (2019–2020)
- (Czech Republic) Dušan Uhrin Jr. (2020)
- (Portugal) Jorge Costa (2020–2021)
- (Romania) Marin Dună (2022) (caretaker)
- (Romania) Flavius Boroncoi (2022)
