= Cristian Pustai =

Romanian footballer and manager

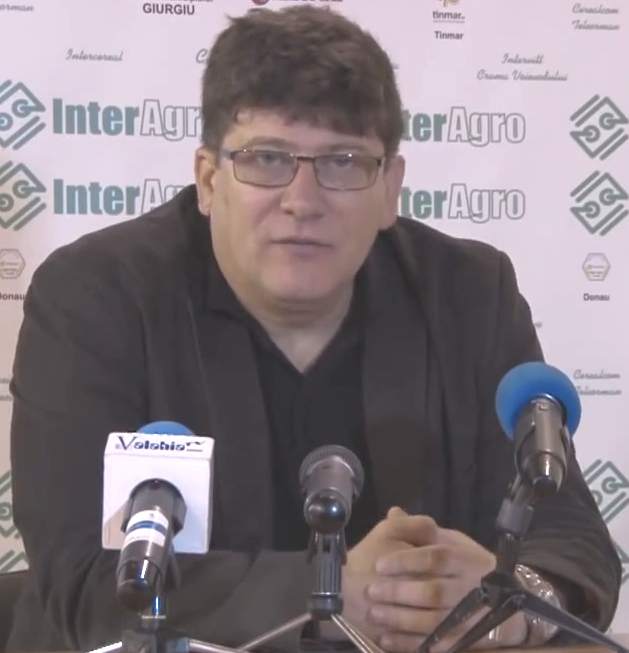
- Pustai in 2012

Personal information
- Full name: Cristian Dumitru Pustai
- Date of birth: 12 October 1967 (age 59)
- Place of birth: Mediaș, Romania
- Height: 1.75 m (5 ft 9 in)
- Position: Striker

Team information
- Current team: Unirea Alba Iulia (head coach)

Youth career
- –1985: Gaz Metan Mediaş
- 1985–1987: Șoimii Sibiu

Senior career*
Years	Team	Apps	(Gls)
1987–1995	Gaz Metan Mediaş		
1995–1998	Apullum Alba Iulia		
1998–2000	Chimica Târnăveni		
Total			(170)

Managerial career
- 2000: Chimica Târnăveni
- 2003–2007: Gaz Metan Mediaş (youth)
- 2007–2013: Gaz Metan Mediaş
- 2013–2014: Pandurii Târgu Jiu
- 2014: ASA Târgu Mureș
- 2015: Rapid București
- 2015–2016: Botoșani
- 2016–2018: Gaz Metan Mediaș
- 2018–2019: Gaz Metan Mediaș (technical director)
- 2019–2021: Dunărea Călărași
- 2021–2022: FC Buzău
- 2022–2024: Ceahlăul Piatra Neamț
- 2024–2025: Gloria Bistrița
- 2025–2026: Ceahlăul Piatra Neamț
- 2026: CSM Olimpia Satu Mare (technical director)
- 2026–: Unirea Alba Iulia
- * Club domestic league appearances and goals

Cristian Dumitru Pustai (born 12 October 1967) is a Romanian football manager and former footballer who played as a striker, currently head coach at Liga III club Unirea Alba Iulia.

== Club career ==
Cristian Pustai played as a striker for Gaz Metan Mediaş, Unirea Alba Iulia and Chimica Târnăveni. He is credited for scoring 170 goals for these teams.

== Coaching career ==
=== Chimica Târnăveni ===
He began his coaching career at Chimica Târnăveni, towards the end of the 1999–2000 edition of Division B, when he led the team as a playing-coach. He quit his job there after the team was relegated from the Liga III. Afterwards he became a math teacher.

=== Gaz Metan Mediaş ===
In 2003, he became a part of Gaz Metan Mediaş's staff, coaching the youth teams.

In 2007 Pustai was appointed head coach of then Liga II club Gaz Metan Mediaş. He managed to win the 2007–08 Liga II in the first season with the team, gaining promotion to the Liga I. In the first division, the team under his guidance had a constant progress. In the 2011–12 season Gaz Metan Mediaş played in the UEFA Europa League under his command. They managed to knock out Mainz 05, but were subsequently knocked out by Austria Wien.

=== Pandurii Târgu Jiu ===
In January 2013, Pustai took over Pandurii Târgu Jiu. At the end of 2012–13 season, Pandurii finished as Liga I runner-up for the first time in the history, becoming the vice-champion of Romania, and qualified for the first time in Europa League. Starting its European adventure from the second qualifying round, Pandurii qualified in the group stage after surprisingly eliminating Sporting Braga with 2–0, after the pandurs were defeated with 0–1. In the group stage, Pandurii failed to win any match, drawing twice with Paços de Ferreira and losing against Fiorentina and Dnipro Dnipropetrovsk. In the championship, Pandurii failed to maintain its position between the first squads, and after a poor series of results which led the team to fall to the sixth place, Pustai resigned from his duties on 23 April 2014.

=== ASA Târgu Mureș ===
On 30 September 2014, he signed a contract with ASA Târgu Mureș. He was sacked on 29 December 2014.

=== Rapid București ===
On 8 January 2015, he was announced as the new head coach of Rapid București. His objective was to save the team from its precarious position, the 18th in Liga I. He was however sacked on 14 April 2015 due to poor results. He was replaced by Cristiano Bergodi. On 16 July 2024, agent Bogdan Apostu announced that Cristian Pustai will become the new coach of CS Gloria Bistrița-Năsăud.

== Managerial statistics ==
As of 7 December 2025

Team	From	To	Record						
Team	From	To	G	W	D	L	GF	GA	Win %
(Romania) Gaz Metan Mediaş	9 March 2007	18 January 2013	223	91	55	77	296	218	40.81
(Romania) Pandurii Târgu Jiu	20 January 2013	23 April 2014	58	26	11	21	94	67	44.83
(Romania) ASA Târgu Mureș	30 September 2014	17 December 2014	11	6	3	2	16	5	54.55
(Romania) Rapid București	8 January 2015	14 April 2015	9	3	2	4	6	8	33.33
(Romania) Botoșani	2 October 2015	1 April 2016	19	6	4	9	26	28	31.58
(Romania) Gaz Metan Mediaş	6 April 2016	30 June 2018	98	32	32	34	116	112	32.65
(Romania) Dunărea Călărași	23 June 2019	15 June 2021	59	23	15	21	72	83	38.98
(Romania) FC Buzău	1 July 2021	4 October 2022	40	23	6	11	90	40	57.50
(Romania) Ceahlăul Piatra Neamț	8 November 2022	18 May 2024	48	22	13	13	81	58	45.83
(Romania) Gloria Bistrița	22 July 2024	31 August 2025	39	25	8	6	81	38	64.10
(Romania) Ceahlăul Piatra Neamț	25 September 2025	11 February 2026	9	2	2	5	9	11	22.22
Total			613	259	151	203	901	668	42.25

== Honours ==
=== Player ===
Gaz Metan Mediaș

- Liga III: 1992–93

=== Coach ===
Gaz Metan Mediaș

- Liga II: 2015–16

Gloria Bistrița

- Liga III: 2024–25
