= 2026–27 FCSB season =

FCSB
2026–27 season
- Owner: Gigi Becali
- President: Valeriu Argăseală
- Manager: Marius Baciu (until 23 September); Laurențiu Reghecampf
- Stadium: Arena Națională
- Superliga: 8th
- Cupa României: Group stage
- UEFA Conference League: Second qualifying round
Home colours	Away colours	Third colours

The 2026–27 season is the 79th season in the history of FCSB, and the club's 79th consecutive season in Superliga. In addition to the domestic league, the club is participating in the Cupa României and the UEFA Conference League.

== Season overview ==
=== Current squad ===
As of 27 October 2026

Note: Flags indicate national team as defined under FIFA eligibility rules; some limited exceptions apply. Players may hold more than one non-FIFA nationality.

No.	Pos.	Nation	Player
2	DF	ROU	Valentin Crețu
3	DF	POR	André Duarte
4	DF	ROU	Ricardo Pădurariu
5	DF	CMR	Joyskim Dawa
7	FW	KOS	Meriton Korenica
8	MF	FRA	Eddy Gnahoré
10	FW	ROU	Denis Drăguș (Captain)
11	FW	ROU	David Miculescu
13	GK	ROU	Matei Popa
14	FW	CMR	Arnold Garita (on loan from Shenzhen Juniors)
15	MF	ISR	Ofri Arad
17	DF	ROU	Mihai Popescu
18	MF	CPV	João Paulo

No.	Pos.	Nation	Player
19	FW	ROU	David Avram
20	FW	ROU	Dennis Politic
21	DF	COD	Dylan Batubinsika
28	FW	ALG	Aymen Boutoutaou
30	DF	RSA	Siyabonga Ngezana
31	MF	ITA	Juri Cisotti
32	GK	ROU	Ștefan Târnovanu
33	DF	MNE	Risto Radunović
34	GK	ROU	Mihai Udrea
73	MF	CRO	Karlo Muhar (vice-captain)
77	DF	ROU	Luca Stancu
97	DF	MTQ	Ronny Labonne

=== Dual registration ===
Note: Flags indicate national team as defined under FIFA eligibility rules; some limited exceptions apply. Players may hold more than one non-FIFA nationality.

No.	Pos.	Nation	Player
1	GK	ROU	Rareș Andrei (at Concordia Chiajna)
6	DF	ROU	Andrei Dăncuș (at Concordia Chiajna)
22	MF	ROU	Mihai Toma (at Concordia Chiajna)

No.	Pos.	Nation	Player
90	FW	ROU	Alexandru Stoian (at Concordia Chiajna)
98	FW	ROU	David Popa (at Concordia Chiajna)

== Transfers ==
=== In ===
Pos.	Player	Transferred from	Fee	Date	Source
DF	(Martinique) Ronny Labonne	(France) Caen	Undisclosed	18 June 2026	
DF	(Romania) Ricardo Pădurariu	(Romania) Corvinul Hunedoara	Loan return	1 July 2026	
FW	(Romania) Dennis Politic	(Romania) Hermannstadt	Loan return	1 July 2026	
GK	(Romania) Alexandru Maxim	(Romania) Voluntari	Loan return	1 July 2026	
FW	(Romania) Mario Preda	(Romania) Râmnicu Vâlcea	Loan return	1 July 2026	
DF	(Romania) Matei Manolache	(Romania) Gloria Bistrița	Loan return	1 July 2026	
MF	(Romania) Laurențiu Vlăsceanu	(Romania) Unirea Slobozia	Loan return	1 July 2026	
FW	(Romania) Robert Necșulescu	(Romania) Chindia Târgoviște	Loan return	1 July 2026	
MF	(France) Eddy Gnahoré	(Romania) Dinamo București	Free	14 July 2026	
FW	(Algeria) Aymen Boutoutaou	(France) Sochaux	€1,350,000	18 July 2026	
DF	(Romania) Luca Stancu	(Romania) Hermannstadt	Undisclosed	22 July 2026	
DF	(Democratic Republic of the Congo) Dylan Batubinsika	(Greece) AEL	Free	22 July 2026	
FW	(Cameroon) Arnold Garita	(China) Shenzhen Juniors	Loan	20 August 2026	
FW	(Kosovo) Meriton Korenica	(Romania) CFR Cluj	Undisclosed	4 September 2026	
FW	(Romania) Denis Drăguș	(Turkey) Trabzonspor	Free	4 September 2026	
MF	(Croatia) Karlo Muhar	(Romania) CFR Cluj	Free	9 September 2026	

=== Out ===
Pos.	Player	Transferred to	Fee	Date	Source
MF	(Romania) Darius Olaru	(Belgium) Union Saint-Gilloise	€3,000,000	16 June 2026	
GK	(Czech Republic) Lukáš Zima	(Romania) Petrolul Ploiești	Released	17 June 2026	
DF	(Romania) Ionuț Cercel	(Romania) Farul Constanța	Loan	21 June 2026	
DF	(Benin) David Kiki	(Romania) Voluntari	Released	24 June 2026	
GK	(Romania) Alexandru Maxim	(Romania) Universitatea Craiova	Released	1 July 2026	
FW	(Romania) Mario Preda	(Romania) Botoșani	Released	1 July 2026	
DF	(Romania) Matei Manolache	(Romania) Cetatea Suceava	Released	1 July 2026	
FW	(Romania) Robert Necșulescu	(Romania) Unirea Slobozia	Loan	1 July 2026	
MF	(Romania) Vlad Chiricheș		End of contract	1 July 2026	
MF	(Uganda) Baba Alhassan	(Turkey) Mardin 1969	Released	1 July 2026	
DF	(Bosnia and Herzegovina) Daniel Graovac	(Romania) Rapid București	Released	1 July 2026	
FW	(Senegal) Mamadou Thiam	(Turkey) Sarıyer	Released	1 July 2026	
DF	(Romania) Alexandru Pantea	(Greece) Levadiakos	Loan	1 July 2026	
MF	(Romania) Eric Damașcan	(Romania) Popești-Leordeni	Loan	3 July 2026	
DF	(Romania) Raul Alecsandroaie	(Romania) Metalul Buzău	Loan	8 July 2026	
MF	(Romania) Andrei Panait	(Romania) Înainte Modelu	Loan	17 July 2026	
MF	(Romania) Mario Petre	(Romania) Înainte Modelu	Undisclosed	20 July 2026	
MF	(Romania) Laurențiu Vlăsceanu	(Romania) CSA Steaua București	Free	22 July 2026	
MF	(Romania) Mihai Lixandru	(Saudi Arabia) Al Fateh	€600,000	2 August 2026	
DF	(Romania) Luca Galdea	(Romania) ASA Târgu Mureș	Loan	7 August 2026	
MF	(Romania) Codruț Călin	(Romania) Progresul Fundulea	Loan	24 August 2026	
FW	(Romania) Daniel Bîrligea	(Italy) Frosinone	Loan fee: €1,500,000	27 August 2026	
FW	(Romania) Florin Tănase	(Cyprus) Omonia	Free	1 September 2026	
MF	(Romania) Octavian Popescu	(Greece) Levadiakos	Loan	14 September 2026	

== Friendlies ==
=== Pre-season ===
5 July 2026 Friendly	Union Saint-Gilloise (Belgium)	4–0	(Romania) FCSB	Nijlen, Belgium
14:00 UTC+3	Biondic 30'; Florucz 43'; Sylla 84'; Fuseini 86'	Report		Stadium: Campus KFC Nijlen

8 July 2026 Friendly	FCSB (Romania)	1–0	(United Arab Emirates) Al Jazira	Venray, Netherlands
18:00 UTC+3	O. Popescu 11'			Stadium: Halt Holthees

=== Mid-season ===
15 November 2026 Friendly	Chindia Târgoviște (Romania)	1–2	(Romania) FCSB	Târgoviște
12:00 UTC+2	Dumitrache 83'	Report	Muhar 80'; Miculescu 90+2'	Stadium: Eugen Popescu; Attendance: 3,183; Referee: Andrei Vremaroiu

== Competitions ==
=== Overall record ===
Competition	First match	Last match	Starting round	Final position	Record							
Competition	First match	Last match	Starting round	Final position	Pld	W	D	L	GF	GA	GD	Win %
Superliga	17 July 2026	May 2027	Matchday 1		15	6	3	6	20	21	−1	40.00
Cupa României	2 September 2026		Group stage		2	1	0	1	5	1	+4	50.00
UEFA Conference League	23 July 2026	30 July 2026	Second qualifying round	Second qualifying round	2	0	0	2	3	7	−4	0.00
Total					19	7	3	9	28	29	−1	36.84

Last updated: 7 November 2026
Source: Soccerway

=== Superliga ===
==== Regular season ====
Pos	Team	Pld	W	D	L	GF	GA	GD	Pts	Qualification
6	Farul Constanța	15	6	6	3	24	22	+2	24	Advances to Play-off
7	Corvinul Hunedoara	15	6	4	5	17	16	+1	22	Advances to Play-out
8	FCSB	15	6	3	6	20	21	−1	21	Advances to Play-out
9	CFR Cluj	15	5	4	6	20	21	−1	19	Advances to Play-out
10	UTA Arad	15	5	3	7	16	19	−3	18	Advances to Play-out

Updated to match(es) played on 9 November 2026. Source: LPF (in Romanian)
Rules for classification: 1) Points; 2) Head-to-head points; 3) Head-to-head goal difference; 4) Head-to-head goals scored; 5) Goal difference; 6) Goals scored; 7) Play-off.

==== Results summary ====
Overall								Home						Away					
Pld	W	D	L	GF	GA	GD	Pts	W	D	L	GF	GA	GD	W	D	L	GF	GA	GD
15	6	3	6	20	21	−1	21	4	2	2	15	11	+4	2	1	4	5	10	−5

==== Results by round ====
Round	1	2	3	4	5	6	7	8	9	10	11	12	13	14	15	16	17	18	19	20	21	22	23	24	25	26	27	28	29	30
Ground	H	A	H	A	H	A	H	A	H	A	H	A	H	A	H	A	H	A	H	A	H	A	H	A	H	A	H	A	H	A
Result	W	W	D	D	W	L	L	L	D	L	W	W	W	L	L															
Position	3	1	1	2	1	2	5	6	7	11	9	6	6	7	8															

A = Away; H = Home; W = Win; D = Draw; L = Loss

==== Results ====
The match schedule was released on 26 June 2026.

17 July 2026 1	FCSB	2–0	FC Argeș	Bucharest
21:30 UTC+3	Bîrligea 19'; Tănase 45+4' (pen.)	Report		Stadium: Steaua; Attendance: 8,424; Referee: Marian Barbu

26 July 2026 2	Csíkszereda	0–2	FCSB	Miercurea Ciuc
21:30 UTC+3		Report	Radunović 3'; Politic 16'	Stadium: Miercurea Ciuc Municipal; Attendance: 1,633; Referee: Viorel Flueran

3 August 2026 3	FCSB	2–2	Farul Constanța	Bucharest
21:30 UTC+3	Dawa 57'; João Paulo 86'	Report	Doicaru 21'; Radaslavescu 45+1'	Stadium: Arcul de Triumf; Attendance: 4,694; Referee: Adrian Cojocaru

10 August 2026 4	Sepsi OSK	0–0	FCSB	Sfântu Gheorghe
21:30 UTC+3		Report		Stadium: Sepsi Arena; Attendance: 7,900; Referee: Florin Andrei

17 August 2026 5	FCSB	3–2	Botoșani	Bucharest
21:30 UTC+3	João Paulo 10'; Bîrligea 63', 90+6'	Report	Dumiter 36', 62'	Stadium: Arcul de Triumf; Attendance: 4,681; Referee: Rareș Vidican

23 August 2026 6	CFR Cluj	1–0	FCSB	Cluj-Napoca
21:30 UTC+3	Cordea 77' (pen.)	Report		Stadium: Dr. Constantin Rădulescu; Attendance: 10,543; Referee: George Găman

30 August 2026 7	FCSB	1–3	UTA Arad	Târgoviște
21:00 UTC+3	Stoian 49'	Report	Coman 26', 78'; Abdallah 54'	Stadium: Eugen Popescu; Attendance: 7,305; Referee: Szabolcs Kovács

5 September 2026 8	Dinamo București	2–1	FCSB	Bucharest
20:30 UTC+3	Pascual 36'; Arad 78' (o.g.)	Report	Miculescu 84'	Stadium: Arcul de Triumf; Attendance: 6,592; Referee: István Kovács

14 September 2026 9	FCSB	2–2	Petrolul Ploiești	Bucharest
21:00 UTC+3	Arad 14' (pen.); Korenica 24'	Report	Nlundulu 3'; Malula 66'	Stadium: Arena Națională; Attendance: 9,232; Referee: Iulian Călin

19 September 2026 10	Universitatea Craiova	5–0	FCSB	Craiova
20:30 UTC+3	Al Hamlawi 29', 45+3'; Cicâldău 57'; Elisor 69', 87'	Report		Stadium: Ion Oblemenco; Attendance: 27,696; Referee: Horațiu Feșnic

10 October 2026 11	FCSB	1–0	Oțelul Galați	Bucharest
21:30 UTC+3	Stoian 65'	Report		Stadium: Arena Națională; Attendance: 10,211; Referee: George Roman

19 October 2026 12	Voluntari	1–2	FCSB	Voluntari
21:00 UTC+3	Guțea 59'	Report	Garita 27'; Stoian 85'	Stadium: Anghel Iordănescu; Attendance: 1,760; Referee: Gabriel Mihuleac

24 October 2026 13	FCSB	4–1	Rapid București	Bucharest
21:00 UTC+3	Muhar 58'; Boutoutaou 69', 81'; João Paulo 79'	Report	Stojilković 11'	Stadium: Arena Națională; Attendance: 38,353; Referee: Horațiu Feșnic

2 November 2026 14	Universitatea Cluj	1–0	FCSB	Cluj-Napoca
20:30 UTC+2	Lukić 76'	Report		Stadium: Cluj Arena; Attendance: 16,104; Referee: Iulian Călin

7 November 2026 15	FCSB	0–1	Corvinul Hunedoara	Bucharest
20:30 UTC+2		Report	Fábry 41'	Stadium: Arena Națională; Attendance: 5,688; Referee: Andrei Moroiță

21 November 2026 16	FC Argeș	v	FCSB	Mioveni
		Report		Stadium: Orășenesc

28 November 2026 17	FCSB	v	Csíkszereda	Bucharest
		Report		Stadium: Arena Națională

5 December 2026 18	Farul Constanța	v	FCSB	Ovidiu
		Report		Stadium: Central

12 December 2026 19	FCSB	v	Sepsi OSK	Bucharest
		Report		Stadium: Arena Națională

19 December 2026 20	Botoșani	v	FCSB	Botoșani
		Report		Stadium: Botoșani Municipal

16 January 2027 21	FCSB	v	CFR Cluj	Bucharest
		Report		Stadium: Arena Națională

23 January 2027 22	UTA Arad	v	FCSB	Arad
		Report		Stadium: Francisc von Neuman

30 January 2027 23	FCSB	v	Dinamo București	Bucharest
		Report		Stadium: Arena Națională

6 February 2027 24	Petrolul Ploiești	v	FCSB	Ploiești
		Report		Stadium: Ilie Oană

10 February 2027 25	FCSB	v	Universitatea Craiova	Bucharest
		Report		Stadium: Arena Națională

13 February 2027 26	Oțelul Galați	v	FCSB	Galați
		Report		Stadium: Oțelul

20 February 2027 27	FCSB	v	Voluntari	Bucharest
		Report		Stadium: Arena Națională

27 February 2027 28	Rapid București	v	FCSB	Bucharest
		Report		Stadium: Arena Națională

6 March 2027 29	FCSB	v	Universitatea Cluj	Bucharest
		Report		Stadium: Arena Națională

13 March 2027 30	Corvinul Hunedoara	v	FCSB	Arad
		Report		Stadium: Francisc von Neuman

=== Cupa României ===
==== Group stage ====
Pos	Team	Pld	W	D	L	GF	GA	GD	Pts	Qualification	FCS	CSI	BIH	BRA	GLO	ARG
1	FCSB	1	1	0	0	5	0	+5	3	Advance to knockout phase	—	2 Dec	—	—	—	—
2	Csíkszereda Miercurea Ciuc	1	1	0	0	2	0	+2	3	Advance to knockout phase	—	—	28 Oct	—	—	—
3	Bihor Oradea	1	0	1	0	2	2	0	1		—	—	—	—	—	2 Dec
4	Corona Brașov	1	0	1	0	2	2	0	1		—	—	2–2	—	2 Dec	28 Oct
5	Gloria Bistrița	1	0	0	1	0	2	−2	0		28 Oct	0–2	—	—	—	—
6	Argeș Pitești	1	0	0	1	0	5	−5	0		0–5	—	—	—	—	—

Updated to match(es) played on 2 September 2026. Source: Flashscore
Legend: Blue = home team win; Yellow = draw; Red = away team win.

2 September 2026 1	FC Argeș	0–5	FCSB	Mioveni
21:30 UTC+3		Report	Miculescu 30', 38'; Boutoutaou 69'; D. Popa 82'; Gnahoré 90'	Stadium: Orășenesc; Referee: Rareș Vidican

29 October 2026 2	Gloria Bistrița	1–0	FCSB	Bistrița
21:30 UTC+2	Bradu 23'	Report		Stadium: Jean Pădureanu; Referee: Cristian Moldoveanu

2 December 2026 3	FCSB	v	Csíkszereda	Bucharest
		Report		Stadium: Arena Națională

=== UEFA Conference League ===
==== Second qualifying round ====
The draw was held on 17 June 2026.

23 July 2026 First leg	FCSB (Romania)	2–3	(Latvia) Auda	Bucharest
20:45 UTC+3	O. Popescu 23'; Boutoutaou 71'	Report	Dašķevičs 5'; Diedhiou 32'; K. Kone 90+4'	Stadium: Steaua; Attendance: 13,319; Referee: David Fuxman (Israel)

30 July 2026 Second leg	Auda (Latvia)	4–1 (7–3 agg.)	(Romania) FCSB	Riga, Latvia
19:00 UTC+3	Diedhiou 45+2', 67'; K. Kone 84'; Hrvoj 90+3'	Report	João Paulo 58'	Stadium: Skonto; Attendance: 3,618; Referee: Tom Owen (Wales)

== Statistics ==
=== Appearances ===
The following 28 players made appearances for FCSB's first team during the season.

Includes all competitions for senior teams.

As of match played 7 November 2026

2026–27 season
Squad number	Pos.	Player	Superliga	Cupa României	Conference League	Season total
2	DF	(Romania) Valentin Crețu	7+3	0	1+1	12
3	DF	(Portugal) André Duarte	12	1	2	15
4	DF	(Romania) Ricardo Pădurariu	14	0+1	1	16
5	DF	(Cameroon) Joyskim Dawa	13	1+1	2	17
7	FW	(Kosovo) Meriton Korenica	8	0+1	0	9
8	MF	(France) Eddy Gnahoré	2+5	1+1	1+1	11
10	FW	(Romania) Denis Drăguș	2+2	0	0	4
11	FW	(Romania) David Miculescu	8+2	2	0	12
13	GK	(Romania) Matei Popa	3	2	0	5
14	FW	(Cameroon) Arnold Garita	7+1	1	0	9
15	MF	(Israel) Ofri Arad	4+5	2	0	11
17	DF	(Romania) Mihai Popescu	0	1	0	1
18	MF	(Cape Verde) João Paulo	5+9	2	0+1	17
20	FW	(Romania) Dennis Politic	2+8	1	0+1	12
21	DF	(Democratic Republic of the Congo) Dylan Batubinsika	7+1	1	0	9
22	MF	(Romania) Mihai Toma	2+3	0+1	0+2	8
28	FW	(Algeria) Aymen Boutoutaou	8+4	1+1	2	16
31	MF	(Italy) Juri Cisotti	13+1	1+1	2	18
32	GK	(Romania) Ștefan Târnovanu	12	0	2	13
33	DF	(Montenegro) Risto Radunović	8+1	0	2	11
73	MF	(Croatia) Karlo Muhar	7	0	0	7
77	DF	(Romania) Luca Stancu	1+3	2	0	6
90	FW	(Romania) Alexandru Stoian	1+13	0+2	0+2	18
97	DF	(Martinique) Ronny Labonne	5+1	2	1	9
98	FW	(Romania) David Popa	1+3	1+1	0	6
Players sold, released or loaned out during the season:
7	MF	(Romania) Octavian Popescu	3+3	0	2	8
9	FW	(Romania) Daniel Bîrligea	5+1	0	2	8
10	FW	(Romania) Florin Tănase	5+1	0	2	8

=== Goalscorers ===
Includes all competitions for senior teams. The list is sorted by squad number when season-total goals are equal. Players with no goals are not included in the list.

As of match played 24 October 2026

2026–27 season
Rk.	No.	Pos.	Player	Superliga	Cupa României	Conference League	Season total
1	18	MF	(Cape Verde) João Paulo	3	0	1	4
1	28	FW	(Algeria) Aymen Boutoutaou	2	1	1	4
3	9	FW	(Romania) Daniel Bîrligea	3	0	0	3
3	11	FW	(Romania) David Miculescu	1	2	0	3
3	90	FW	(Romania) Alexandru Stoian	3	0	0	3
6	5	DF	(Cameroon) Joyskim Dawa	1	0	0	1
6	7	MF	(Romania) Octavian Popescu	0	0	1	1
6	7	FW	(Kosovo) Meriton Korenica	1	0	0	1
6	8	MF	(France) Eddy Gnahoré	0	1	0	1
6	10	FW	(Romania) Florin Tănase	1	0	0	1
6	14	FW	(Cameroon) Arnold Garita	1	0	0	1
6	15	MF	(Israel) Ofri Arad	1	0	0	1
6	20	FW	(Romania) Dennis Politic	1	0	0	1
6	33	DF	(Montenegro) Risto Radunović	1	0	0	1
6	73	MF	(Croatia) Karlo Muhar	1	0	0	1
6	98	FW	(Romania) David Popa	0	1	0	1
Total				20	5	3	28

=== Clean sheets ===
Includes all competitions for senior teams.

As of match played 7 November 2026

2026–27 season
Rk.	No.	Goalkeeper	Superliga	Cupa României	Conference League	Season total	Season percentage
1	32	(Romania) Ștefan Târnovanu	3	0	0	3	21% (3/14)
2	13	(Romania) Matei Popa	1	1	0	2	40% (2/5)
Total			4	1	0	5	26% (5/19)

=== Disciplinary record ===
Includes all competitions for senior teams. The list is sorted by red cards, then yellow cards (and by squad number when total cards are equal). Players with no cards are not included in the list.

As of match played 7 November 2026

Rk.	No.	Pos.	Player	Superliga			Cupa României			Conference League			Total		
Rk.	No.	Pos.	Player	Yellow card	Second yellow card	Red card	Yellow card	Second yellow card	Red card	Yellow card	Second yellow card	Red card	Yellow card	Second yellow card	Red card
1	3	DF	(Portugal) André Duarte	0	0	1	0	0	0	0	0	0	0	0	1
2	4	DF	(Romania) Ricardo Pădurariu	4	0	0	1	0	0	0	0	0	5	0	0
3	2	DF	(Romania) Valentin Crețu	4	0	0	0	0	0	0	0	0	4	0	0
4	18	MF	(Cape Verde) João Paulo	3	0	0	0	0	0	0	0	0	3	0	0
4	33	DF	(Montenegro) Risto Radunović	3	0	0	0	0	0	0	0	0	3	0	0
4	73	MF	(Croatia) Karlo Muhar	3	0	0	0	0	0	0	0	0	3	0	0
7	5	DF	(Cameroon) Joyskim Dawa	0	0	0	0	0	0	2	0	0	2	0	0
7	7	MF	(Romania) Octavian Popescu	1	0	0	0	0	0	1	0	0	2	0	0
7	9	FW	(Romania) Daniel Bîrligea	2	0	0	0	0	0	0	0	0	2	0	0
7	10	FW	(Romania) Florin Tănase	2	0	0	0	0	0	0	0	0	2	0	0
7	21	DF	(Democratic Republic of the Congo) Dylan Batubinsika	1	0	0	1	0	0	0	0	0	2	0	0
7	22	MF	(Romania) Mihai Toma	1	0	0	1	0	0	0	0	0	2	0	0
7	77	DF	(Romania) Luca Stancu	1	0	0	1	0	0	0	0	0	2	0	0
7	97	DF	(Martinique) Ronny Labonne	1	0	0	1	0	0	0	0	0	2	0	0
15	9	FW	(Romania) Denis Drăguș	1	0	0	0	0	0	0	0	0	1	0	0
15	15	MF	(Israel) Ofri Arad	1	0	0	0	0	0	0	0	0	1	0	0
15	20	FW	(Romania) Dennis Politic	1	0	0	0	0	0	0	0	0	1	0	0
15	28	FW	(Algeria) Aymen Boutoutaou	1	0	0	0	0	0	0	0	0	1	0	0
15	31	MF	(Italy) Juri Cisotti	1	0	0	0	0	0	0	0	0	1	0	0
15	32	GK	(Romania) Ștefan Târnovanu	1	0	0	0	0	0	0	0	0	1	0	0
Total				32	0	1	5	0	0	3	0	0	40	0	1
