= Matei Popa =

Romanian footballer (born 2007)

Personal information
- Full name: Matei Alexandru Popa
- Date of birth: 29 April 2007 (age 19)
- Place of birth: Timișoara, Romania
- Height: 1.95 m (6 ft 5 in)
- Position: Goalkeeper

Team information
- Current team: FCSB
- Number: 13

Youth career
- –2021: LPS Bihorul Oradea
- 2021–2026: FCSB

Senior career*
Years	Team	Apps	(Gls)
2026–	FCSB	16	(0)
- * Club domestic league appearances and goals as of 17 August 2026

Matei Alexandru Popa (born 29 April 2007) is a Romanian professional footballer who plays as a goalkeeper for Liga I club FCSB.

== Club career ==
On 1 February 2026, Popa made his league debut, starting for FCSB against FK Csíkszereda, where he managed a clean sheet in a 1–0 win.

== Career statistics ==
As of 29 October 2026

Appearances and goals by club, season and competition
Club	Season	League			Cupa Romaniei		Europe		Other		Total	
Club	Season	Division	Apps	Goals	Apps	Goals	Apps	Goals	Apps	Goals	Apps	Goals
FCSB	2025–26	Liga I	13	0	1	0	0	0	0	0	14	0
FCSB	2026–27	Liga I	3	0	2	0	0	0	—		5	0
Career total			16	0	3	0	0	0	0	0	19	0

== Personal life ==
He is the son of former Romanian international footballer Marius Popa, who is currently the goalkeeping coach at Liga I club FCSB.
