= Octavian Popescu (footballer, born 2002) =

Romanian footballer (born 2002)

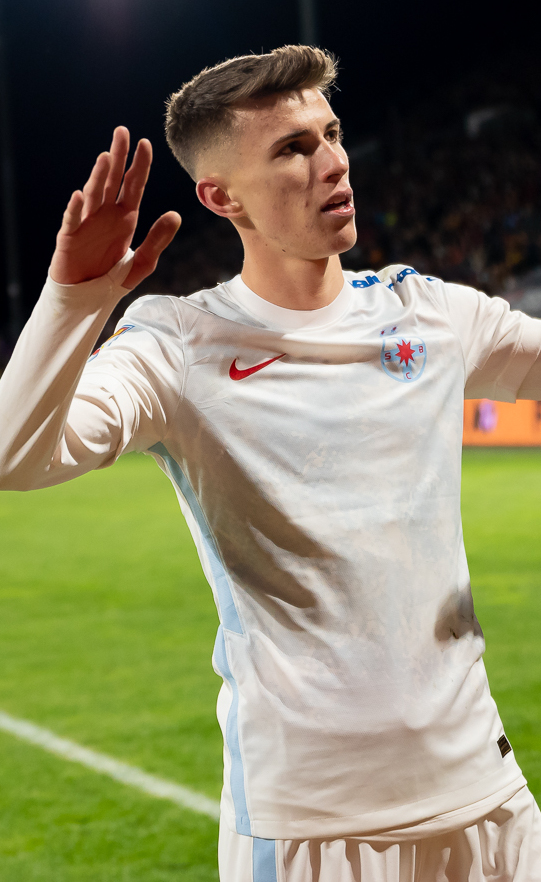
- Popescu with FCSB in 2022

Personal information
- Full name: Octavian George Popescu
- Date of birth: 27 December 2002 (age 23)
- Place of birth: Târgoviște, Romania
- Height: 1.80 m (5 ft 11 in)
- Positions: Winger; attacking midfielder

Team information
- Current team: Levadiakos (on loan from FCSB)
- Number: 30

Youth career
- 2011–2014: Grup Școlar Agricol Nucet
- 2014–2020: Regal Sport București
- 2019: → Rapid București (loan)
- 2019–2020: → Universitatea Craiova (loan)

Senior career*
Years	Team	Apps	(Gls)
2020–	FCSB	187	(25)
2026–	→ Levadiakos (loan)	6	(0)

International career^{‡}
2021–2025	Romania U21	19	(2)
2021	Romania Olympic	2	(0)
2022–2023	Romania	7	(0)
- * Club domestic league appearances and goals as of 8 November 2026 ‡ National team caps and goals as of 17 June 2025

Octavian George Popescu (Romanian pronunciation: [oktaviˈan ˈdʒe̯ordʒe poˈpesku]; born 27 December 2002) is a Romanian professional footballer who plays as a winger or an attacking midfielder for Super League Greece club Levadiakos, on loan from Liga I club FCSB..

After playing junior football for Rapid București and Universitatea Craiova among others, Popescu recorded his professional debut with FCSB in 2020, at age 17. He won his first national title in the 2023–24 season.

Internationally, Popescu made his senior debut for Romania in a 0–1 friendly loss to Greece in March 2022. He previously represented the nation at under-21 and under-23 levels, competing in two UEFA European Championships with the former.

== Club career ==
=== Early career ===
Popescu started practising football at age eight with the team of his local high school from Nucet, Dâmbovița County. In 2014, he moved to Regal Sport București, where he was teammates with Radu Drăgușin and Luca Florică among others. The capital-based club loaned him out to Rapid București and Universitatea Craiova, respectively, before Popescu joined FCSB in 2020.

=== FCSB ===
==== 2020–2021: Debut season ====
Popescu was loaned out by FCSB to second tier side Turris Turnu Măgurele on 20 August 2020, but was immediately recalled to his parent club after general manager Mihai Stoica and owner Gigi Becali found out the deal was agreed over their heads. One month later, aged 17, he made his professional debut for FCSB by coming on for Robert Ion in the 50th minute of a 3–0 Liga I win over Argeș Pitești.

Popescu scored his first career goal and also provided an assist on 30 January 2021, in a 3–1 defeat of Politehnica Iași at the Arena Națională. On 15 April 2021, he started in a 1–4 penalty shoot-out loss to CFR Cluj in the Supercupa României. FCSB also lost the national title to the latter opponent, and he ended his debut season as a senior with four goals from 34 appearances in all competitions.

==== 2021–present: Development and inconsistency ====
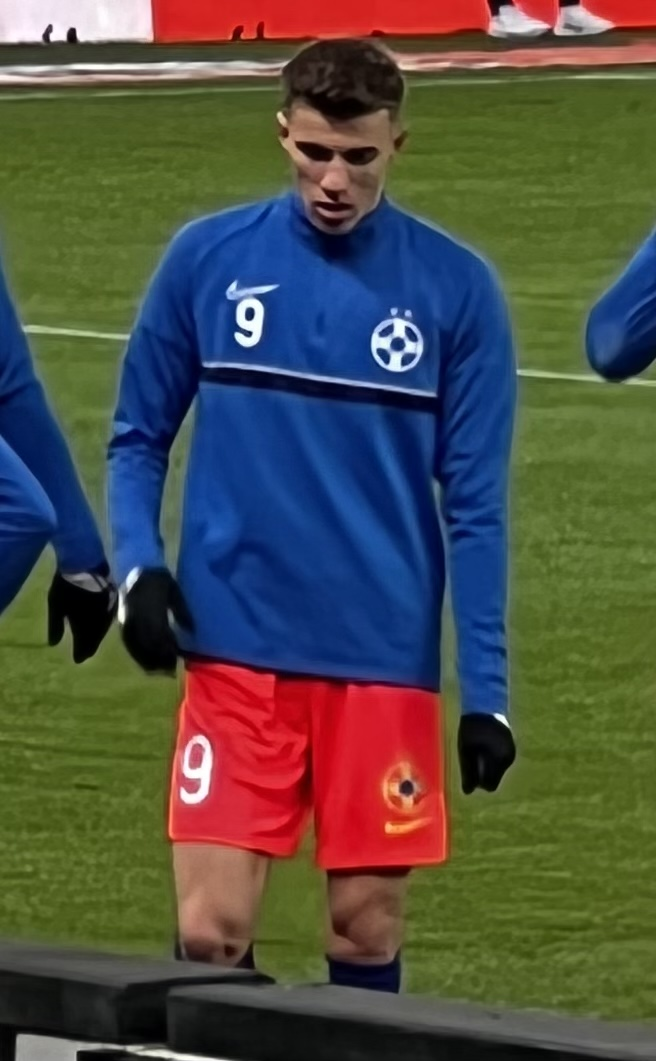
Popescu with FCSB in 2022

On 25 July 2021, Popescu scored in a 4–1 league defeat of his former youth team Universitatea Craiova, and on 12 September netted in a 6–0 derby thrashing of Dinamo București. In January 2022, he opened the scoring in successive fixtures against CFR Cluj (3–3 draw) and Dinamo București (3–0 win). Popescu scored the only goal of a championship play-off match against CFR Cluj on 17 April, representing FCSB's first win at the Dr. Constantin Rădulescu Stadium in almost eight years. He amassed 38 appearances and ten goals in his second season in Bucharest.

Ahead of the 2022–23 campaign, Popescu switched his shirt number from 9 to 11, but at the end of July was handed the number 10 jersey and also appointed vice-captain as a result of Florin Tănase's imminent departure. After a several-month goal drought, he scored his first goal of the season on 6 November, in a 3–1 derby win over Rapid București. It was a disappointing year for Popescu, only totalling four goals in all competitions, the last in another game against Rapid in which he was sent off less than 20 minutes after he came on, on 27 May 2023.

On 29 July 2023, in the first league match after his suspension expired, Popescu opened a 2–0 away win over newly-promoted Oțelul Galați. He scored his first goal in European competitions on 3 August, his late winner helping defeat CSKA 1948 3–2 at home and 4–2 on aggregate in the second qualifying round of the UEFA Europa Conference League.

Popescu's poor form continued throughout the 2023–24 season, but he aided with 33 appearances as FCSB won its first national title in seven years. On 6 October 2024, he scored his first two goals in more than a year, in a 3–2 home victory over Gloria Buzău.

== International career ==
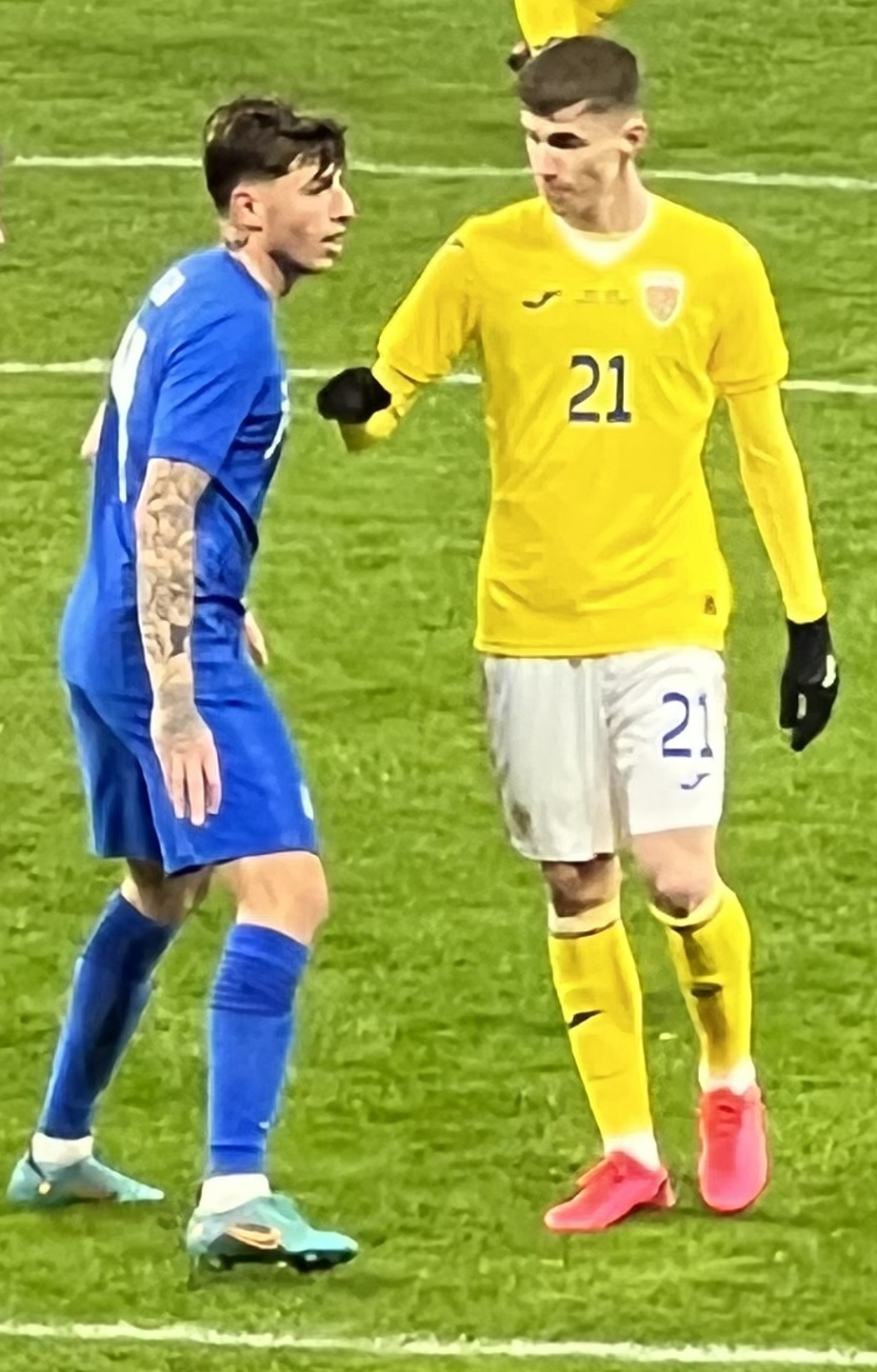
Popescu (right) on his senior debut for Romania against Greece in March 2022

Popescu did not represent Romania at any level prior to 2021, in spite of being considered a talented prospect. He made his debut for the under-21 side in March 2021, aged 18, after entering as a substitute in the UEFA European Championship group stage matches against Hungary and Germany, which ended 2–1 and 0–0, respectively.

In June 2021, Popescu featured for the under-23 team in friendlies against Mexico and Australia, but was later not allowed by FCSB to participate in the postponed 2020 Summer Olympics. On 25 March 2022, 19-year-old Popescu was handed his full debut for Romania in a 0–1 exhibition loss to Greece at the Stadionul Steaua, being brought on for Alexandru Mitriță in the 62nd minute.

On 15 June 2023, Popescu returned to the Romania under-21 squad and was selected for his second European Championship.

== Player profile ==
=== Style of play ===
Popescu's best attributes are his pace and acceleration, while at the same time possesses appreciable dribbling skills and creativity. He is able to strike the ball with both feet, and has been deployed in the centre as an attacking midfielder or wide as a winger.

=== Reception ===
Popescu's breakthrough in FCSB's senior team was highly regarded by Romanian pundits—Cornel Dinu described him as a "very talented kid of extraordinary quality" who "has similarities to Florea Dumitrache", Gabi Balint stated he is a quick-thinking genius "just like [Gheorghe] Hagi was", and Basarab Panduru emphasised his versatility. Dinu continued his praises and compared him to Adrian Mutu, considering Popescu can have a much more successful career.

His former coach Daniel Pancu regarded him a "fantastic talent", while Dorinel Munteanu said that he is a "youngster who looks different from what we have in Romania" and that from his "generation, from [Gheorghe] Hagi—not even from Adrian Mutu, but from Hagi" he has "never seen such a lightness to play in depth or to provide the final pass".

When discussing his weaknesses, Balint noted in February 2021 that Popescu should become more consistent during the full 90 minutes and build muscle mass, and the following year Ioan Sabău made a similar remark. In May 2023, after being sent off in a match against Rapid București, former LPF president Dumitru Dragomir accused Popescu of "lack of education".

== Personal life ==
His father, Beniamin, was also a footballer who played for FCM Târgoviște and Jiul Petroșani.

== Career statistics ==
=== Club ===
As of match played 8 November 2026

Appearances and goals by club, season and competition
Club	Season	League			Cupa României		Europe		Other		Total	
Club	Season	Division	Apps	Goals	Apps	Goals	Apps	Goals	Apps	Goals	Apps	Goals
FCSB	2020–21	Liga I	32	4	0	0	1 (Note: Appearance in UEFA Europa League)	0	1 (Note: Appearance in Supercupa României)	0	34	4
FCSB	2021–22	Liga I	36	10	0	0	2 (Note: Appearances in UEFA Europa Conference League)	0	—		38	10
FCSB	2022–23	Liga I	36	4	1	0	12	0	—		49	4
FCSB	2023–24	Liga I	33	2	2	0	4	1	—		39	3
FCSB	2024–25	Liga I	18	4	1	0	6	0	0	0	25	4
FCSB	2025–26	Liga I	26	1	2	0	11 (Note: Two appearances in UEFA Champions League, nine appearances in UEFA Europa League)	0	2 (Note: Appearances in Liga I European play-offs)	1	41	2
FCSB	2026–27	Liga I	6	0	0	0	2	1	—		8	1
FCSB	Total		187	25	6	0	38	2	3	1	234	28
Levadiakos (loan)	2026–27	Super League Greece	6	0	0	0	—		—		6	0
Career Total			193	25	6	0	38	2	3	1	240	28

=== International ===
As of match played 28 March 2023

Appearances and goals by national team and year
National team	Year	Apps	Goals
Romania
Romania	2022	5	0
Romania	2023	2	0
Total		7	0

== Honours ==
FCSB

- Liga I: 2023–24, 2024–25
- Supercupa României: 2024, 2025

Individual

- Gazeta Sporturilor Romania Player of the Month: March 2022
