= FCSB =

Romanian football club, formerly FC Steaua București

- Full name: SC Fotbal Club FCSB SA
- Nickname: Roș-albaștrii (The Red and Blues)
- Short name: FCSB
- Founded: 7 June 1947; 79 years ago as ASA București
- Ground: Arena Națională
- Capacity: 55,634
- Owner: George Becali
- President: Valeriu Argăseală
- Head coach: Laurențiu Reghecampf
- League: Liga I
- 2025–26: Liga I, 8th of 16
- Website: fcsb.ro
Home colours	Away colours	Third colours

Fotbal Club FCSB (Romanian pronunciation: [fet͡ʃeseˌbe]), sometimes still referred to as the former name FC Steaua București, is a Romanian professional football club based in Bucharest. It has spent its entire history in the Liga I, the top flight of the Romanian football league system.

The original Steaua București football team was founded in 1947 and belonged to the Ministry of National Defence, through the namesake CSA Steaua București sports club. In 1998, the football department and its facilities were separated from the latter and taken over by a group of shareholders in a post-Ceaușescu privatisation scheme, leading to one of the shareholders acquiring full ownership five years later. However, CSA Steaua București has been in conflict with the football club since 2011, claiming that it was a new and separate entity; this resulted in multiple court cases and the forced change of the name from FC Steaua București to FC FCSB in early 2017.

Domestically, when taken together with the disputed pre-2003 honours, the club has won the Liga I 27 times, Cupa României 24 times, Cupa Ligii two times, and Supercupa României seven times—all competition records. Internationally, they have won the European Cup and European Super Cup, both in 1986. They reached the European Cup final once again in 1989, when they were defeated by AC Milan. Throughout their history, the Roș-albaștrii also played the final of the Intercontinental Cup, the quarter-finals of the European Cup Winners' Cup, and the semi-finals of the UEFA Cup.

FCSB's home ground is Arena Națională, having moved here from the Ministry of National Defence-owned Stadionul Ghencea. Initially, the club played in the colours of the Romanian tricolour, but yellow was soon phased out in association with the Sovietization of the Army and the team became associated with the red and blue scheme. Starting in 1999–00, some away and third kits have again used yellow.

The club has a long-standing rivalry with neighbouring Dinamo București, with matches between the two being commonly referred to as the "Eternal derby" or the "Romanian derby". Another notable rivalry is the one against Rapid București, while several milder ones are disputed against teams outside the capital, including a recent one against CFR Cluj that commenced because of the title competitions these teams fought in the 21st century.

== History ==
=== 1947–1949: Foundation and early years ===
ASA București (Asociația Sportivă a Armatei București – "Army Sports Association") was founded on 7 June 1947 at the initiative of several officers of the Romanian Royal House. The establishment took place following a decree signed by General Mihail Lascăr, High Commander of the Romanian Royal Army. It was formed as a sports society with seven initial sections, including football, coached by Coloman Braun-Bogdan. The decision had been adopted on the ground that several officers were already playing for different teams, which was premise to a good nucleus for forming a future competitive team.

Period	Name
1947–1948	ASA București
1948–1950	CSCA București
1950–1961	CCA București
1961–1998	CSA Steaua București
1998–2003	AFC Steaua București
2003–2017	FC Steaua București
2017–present	FC FCSB

With this squad, Coloman Braun-Bogdan, the first coach in the club's history, went to a sustained training camp in the mountain resort of Sinaia. Although shirts, boots and balls were missing, atmosphere inside the team was rather optimistic. Thanks to sustained efforts, in the shortest time possible, the club soon acquired the first training suits, navy green, duck material of, and the first shirts, blue. The big surprise, however, were the 40 pairs of boots the club had purchased for the 20 selected players. ASA was renamed CSCA (Clubul Sportiv Central al Armatei – "Central Sports Club of the Army") in 1948 and CCA (Casa Centrală a Armatei – "Central House of the Army") in 1950.

=== 1949–1984: CCA Golden Team ===
In 1949, CSCA won its first trophy, the Cupa României, defeating CSU Cluj 2–1 in the final. Under the name of CCA, the club managed to win three Championship titles in a row in 1951, 1952 and 1953, along with its first Championship–Cup double in 1951. During the 1950s, the so-called "CCA Golden Team" became nationally famous. In 1956, the Romania national team (composed exclusively of CCA players) played Yugoslavia in Belgrade and won 1–0. In the same year, CCA, coached by Ilie Savu, became the first Romanian team to participate in a tournament in England, where it achieved noteworthy results against the likes of Luton Town, Arsenal, Sheffield Wednesday and Wolverhampton Wanderers. After CCA won the 1959–60 title, they were supposed to play in the 1960–61 European Cup against Spartak Hradec Králové who was the champion of Czechoslovakia, but as Romania's national team lost with 5–0 on aggregate against Czechoslovakia in the 1960 European Nations' Cup quarter-finals, when the communist authorities saw that Steaua had to play with the champion of Czechoslovakia in the European Cup, they withdrew the team from the competition, fearing a shameful elimination in front of the Czechoslovaks.

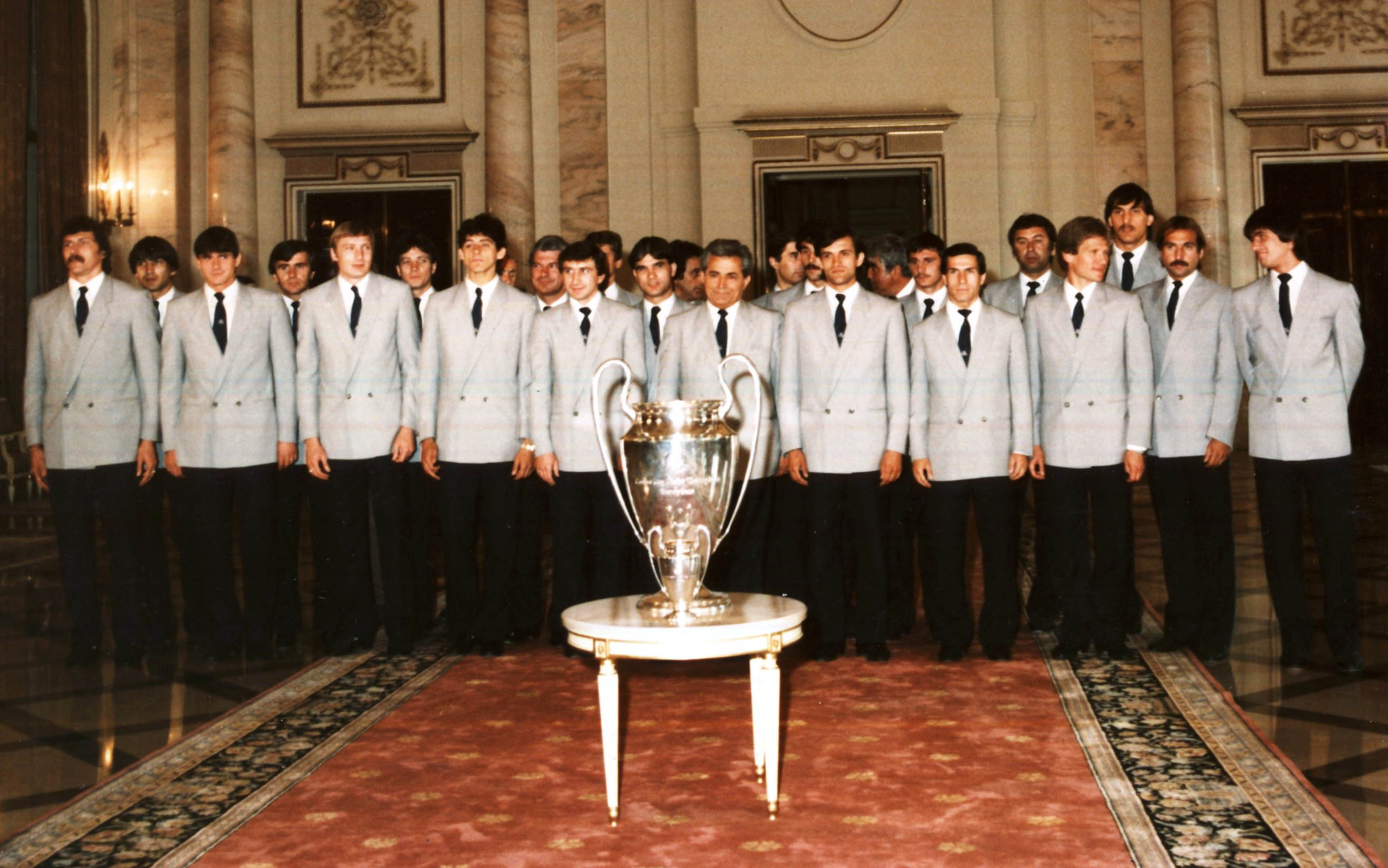
Steaua București squad with the UEFA European Champions Clubs' Cup in 1986.

At the end of 1961, CCA changed its name once again to CSA Steaua București (Clubul Sportiv al Armatei Steaua – "Army Sports Club Steaua"). The club's new name translated to The Star and was adopted because of the presence of a red star, a symbol of most East European Army clubs, on its crest. A poor period of almost two decades followed in which the club claimed only three championships (1967–68, 1975–76, 1977–78). Instead, the team won nine national cup trophies, for which matter it gained the nickname of "cup specialists". Also during this period, on 9 April 1974 Steaua's ground, Stadionul Ghencea, was inaugurated with a friendly match against OFK Belgrade. Internally, fierce rivalry with teams like Dinamo București, Petrolul Ploiești and UTA Arad made it more and more difficult for the military team to reach the title, the 1970s and 1980s seeing them win the title only three times under their new name (1967–68, 1975–76, 1977–78). However, during that same period, Steaua won eight National Cups (1961–62, 1965–66, 1966–67, 1968–69, 1969–70, 1970–71, 1975–76 and 1978–79), ultimately being nicknamed the cup specialists.

The first half of the 1980s was a very poor period for the club, as no trophies were won for six years. However, several prodigies were transferred, such as Helmut Duckadam, Ștefan Iovan, Miodrag Belodedici, Marius Lăcătuș, Victor Pițurcă, Mihail Majearu, Gavril Balint and Adrian Bumbescu, who would set the basis for the future team. However, these years of search and frustration did no less than to foretell the amazing performances of the 1980s and 1990s.

=== 1984–1990: Champions of Europe ===
Under the leadership of coaches Emerich Jenei and Anghel Iordănescu, Steaua had an impressive Championship run in the 1984–85 season, which they eventually won after a six-year break. What followed was an absolutely astonishing European Cup season. After eliminating Vejle, Honvéd, Kuusysi Lahti and Anderlecht, they were the first ever Romanian team to make it to a European Cup final. At the final, played on 7 May 1986 at the Ramón Sánchez Pizjuán Stadium in Seville, Spanish champions Barcelona were clear favourites, but after a goalless draw, legendary goalkeeper Helmut Duckadam saved all four penalties taken by the Spaniards being the first ever Romanian to reach the Guinness Book for that matter, while Gavril Balint and Marius Lăcătuș converted theirs to make Steaua the first Eastern-European team to conquer the supreme continental trophy.

Gheorghe Hagi, Romanian all-time best footballer, joined the club a few months later, scoring the only goal of the match against Dynamo Kyiv which brought Steaua an additional European Super Cup on 24 February 1987 in Monaco, just two months after having lost the Intercontinental Cup 1–0 to Argentinians River Plate in Tokyo. However, that match was marred with a questionable decision by referee José Martínez when he disallowed a clear goal scored by Miodrag Belodedici.

1989 European Cup Final starting lineup.

Surprisingly for those who thought of these performances as an isolated phenomenon, Steaua remained at the top of European football for the rest of the decade, managing one more European Cup semi-final against Benfica (1987–88) and one more European Cup final in 1989, which was lost 4–0 in front of Marco van Basten, Ruud Gullit and Frank Rijkaard's Milan. This happened next to their four additional national titles (1985–86, 1986–87, 1987–88, 1988–89) and four national cups (1984–85, 1986–87, 1987–88, 1988–89). In addition, from June 1986 to September 1989, Steaua ran a record 104-match undefeated streak in the championship, setting a world record for that time and a European one still standing.

During these last years of the Communist regime in Romania, dictator Nicolae Ceaușescu's son Valentin was involved in the life of the team. Valentin Ceaușescu admitted in a 2023 interview that he had done nothing else than to protect his favourite team from Dinamo's sphere of influence, ensured by the Ministry of Internal Affairs. Though contested by some, their five-year winning streak in the championship between 1984–85 and 1988–89 corroborates the notion that the team was really the best during this period.

=== 1990–2002: Post-Revolution era ===
The Romanian Revolution led the country towards a free open market and, subsequently, several players of the 1980s team left for other clubs in the West. After a short pull-back, a quick recovery followed and Steaua managed a six consecutive championship streak between 1992–93 and 1997–98 to equalize the 1920s performance of Chinezul Timișoara and also three more cups in 1995–96, 1996–97 and 1998–99. At an international level, the club also managed to reach the UEFA Champions League group stage three years in a row between 1994–95 and 1996–97. Other records highly regarded by the fans were the eight-year and six-month long undefeated streak in front of arch-rivals Dinamo București, which counted 19 matches in both the championship and the Romanian Cup, and the 17-year and 7-month long undefeated league run at Ghencea against the same Dinamo. At international level, the club managed to reach the Cup Winners' Cup quarter-finals in 1993, when they lost on away goals to Royal Antwerp, and also to make it to the Champions League group stage three years in a row between 1994 and 1995 and 1996–97. In 1998, the football club separated from CSA Steaua and changed its name to FC Steaua București, being led by Romanian businessman Viorel Păunescu. Păunescu performed poorly as a president and soon the club was plunged into debt. George Becali, another businessman, was offered the position of vice-president in the hope that Becali would invest money in the club.

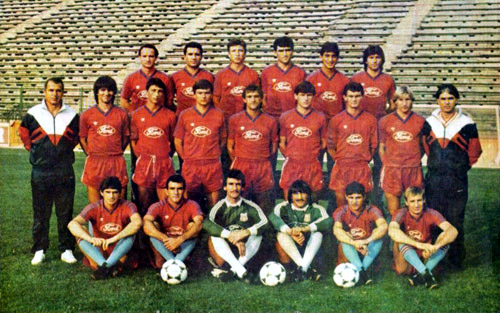
The Steaua București champion team of 1989.

=== 2002–present: Gigi Becali takeover ===
In 2003, Becali managed to gain control over the club by turning it from non-profit to a public share company. Because of his controversial character, he has been challenged by the majority of Steaua fans. The team qualified for the UEFA Cup group stage in the 2004–05 season and became the first Romanian team to make it to the European football spring since 1993 (also Steaua's performance). The next season, Steaua reached the UEFA Cup semi-finals in 2005–06, where it was eliminated by Middlesbrough thanks to a last-minute goal. Steaua thereafter qualified for the following Champions League seasons after a ten-year break, and in 2007–08 Steaua again reached the group stage of the Champions League. Nationally, the club won two titles—in 2004–05 and 2005–06—and the Supercupa României in 2006, the latter being the club's 50th trophy in its 59-year history. In 2013, Steaua won its 24th national title, and also subsequently reached the 2013–14 UEFA Champions League group stage. It repeated the former performance in each of the next two years, being awarded the championship in 2014 and 2015.

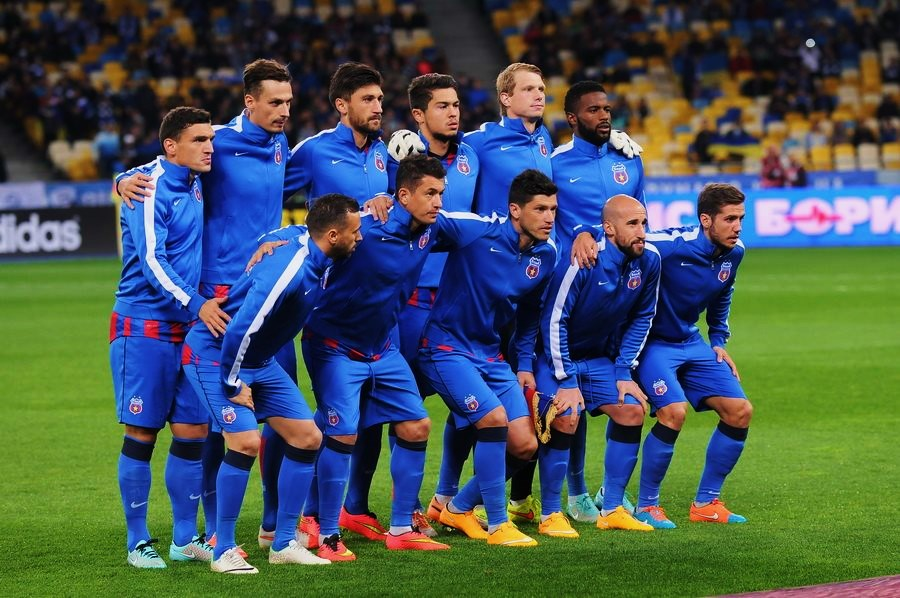
Steaua București players lining up before a UEFA Europa League match in 2014.

After the Ministry of National Defense sued the club, claiming that the Romanian Army were the rightful owners of the Steaua logo, colours, honours and name, the Executive Committee of the Romanian Football Federation approved an application to modify the name of the club from "FC Steaua București" to "FC FCSB" on 30 March 2017, following more judiciary sentences. CSA Steaua București had previously announced they would refound their football department as CSA Steaua București in the summer of the same year. However, owner Becali announced that his team would retain the original honours and UEFA coefficient, and was also hopeful of recovering the name in the near future.

Between 2016 and 2019, FCSB finished each time as runners-up in the league, thus becoming the first club in Romania to do so for four consecutive years. On 5 July 2019, yet another unfavorable ruling was handed out against the team. According to it, CSA Steaua would be the rightful entity to assert the honors up until 2003, however, the decision is not definitive.

In November 2024, CSA announced its intention to sue two soccer VIPs for continuing to claim that FCSB=Steaua, accusing them of violating court verdicts, and producing financial damages. Emil Grădinescu noticed that the verdict about the records or the verdict about the trademark impose no obligations upon third parties.

The verdict about the records remained final in 2025. Odd enough, both sides to the trial claimed victory as of 5 June 2025.

It has also been mentioned that civil law arguments might not be decisive in respect to getting the records recognized by the Romanian Football Federation, UEFA, and FIFA, because they all base their decisions upon the continuity of the team.

Becali stated in a broadcast that FCSB had no real reason to file a recourse, and that the fact that it filed a recourse was a cunning ploy to prevent the CSA from filing a recourse. Becali stated that he was perfectly satisfied with the verdict of the Court of Appeal, therefore the loss of the recourse did not constitute any damage for FCSB.

ESPN reported at the end of 2025 that the identity of the club is murky or lost, it also mentioned that for Dinamo Bucharest there are three clubs which pretend to be the real Dinamo.

The trial about the trademark was still pending before the Constitutional Court of Romania. A verdict is expected on 1 April 2026. A lower court will issue a ruling on 8 April 2026, based upon that verdict. On 1 April 2026 FCSB has lost that trial. This means all national remedies have been exhausted, including extraordinary remedies. Becali subsequently declared he will proceed to the European Court of Human Rights.

== Crest and colours ==
=== Crests ===
During its first season, 1947–48, Steaua wore yellow and red striped shirts with blue shorts, to symbolize Romania's tricolor flag. Starting with the following season and with the Army's change of identity from the Royal Army to the People's Army, the yellow was gradually given up, so that the club's colours became red and blue.

As communists assumed total control of the country on 30 December 1947, the Royal Army was transformed into the People's Army and ASA automatically with it. Being inspired by the Red Army, the new Ministry of Defence decided to create a crest for the club, along with the change of name to CSCA, consisting in an A-labeled red star (symbol of the Red Army) on a blue disc.

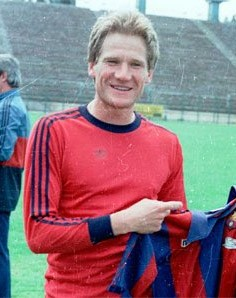
László Bölöni posing in a red-blue training kit in 1986.

Two years later, the change of name to CCA brought with it a new crest consisting of the same red star labeled CCA surrounded by a crown of laurel. The all-present star motif on the crest finally had its saying over the new name of Steaua as up 1961. It was opted for a badge which, redesigned, remains up to this day the club's symbol: the red and blue striped background with a golden star in the middle, to symbolize to Romanian tricolour flag. The shape for the emblem was redesigned in 1974, once the team moved to Stadionul Ghencea.

Following the Romanian Revolution, the Army decided to break all links to the defunct communist regime, so, in 1991, CSA Steaua had a last change of crest with an eagle also present on the Ministry of Defence coat of arms and also on Romania's. As FC Steaua appeared in 1998, the club added two yellow stars on top of the CSA Steaua badge signifying its 20 titles of champions won, along with the Fotbal Club specification.

In 2003, the new Board of Administration run by George Becali decided to change the crest, which was a return to the old emblem of 1974–1991, redesigned with the two yellow stars on top. The club started to use acronym of the name FCSB before the official change of the name in 2017.

The Ministry of National Defense sued Steaua in 2011, claiming that the Romanian Army were the rightful owners of the Steaua logo, among others. The Supreme Court found in the army's favour, and on 3 December 2014 stripped the football club of its badge. Steaua were forced to play their next home game, against CSM Studențesc Iași, without it on the stadium scoreboard. A new badge was unveiled in January 2015, an eight-sided star containing the letters "FCSB", which would eventually become the official name of the club in 2017.

=== Colours ===
Steaua has never had a standard playing kit. However, the most widely used throughout time was the combination of red shirts, blue shorts and red socks. Other variants have been all-red, all-blue and also shirts in vertical red and blue stripes during the 1960s and 1970s. Other kit colours have very rarely been used. Exceptions were the 1986 European Cup Final in which Steaua wore, for the only time in their history, an all-white kit, the 1999–00 away kit (yellow and red), the 2005–06 third kit (yellow and black), the 2008–2010 away kit (a shade of neon yellow-green), the 2010–12 and 2014–16 away kit (all-yellow), the 2012–14 away kit ( all-sky blue or sky blue shirts with dark navy blue shorts and socks). For the 2016–17 and 2017–18 seasons, the away kit was all-white. For the 2018–19 and 2019–20 seasons the away kit was ice blue with a darker shade on sleeves. For the 2020–21 and 2021–22 seasons, the kit is all-white again.

1976–1977	1986–87	2005–06	2013–14

==== Kit manufacturers and shirt sponsors ====
Its kit is manufactured by Nike, who have held the contract since 2002, after a long partnership with Adidas. First team shirt sponsors have been betting company Betano since 2022. Previous sponsors include Ford, Castrol, Philips, CBS, Bancorex, Dialog, BCR, RAFO, CitiFinancial and City Insurance.

== Grounds ==
=== Stadium ===
Arena Națională
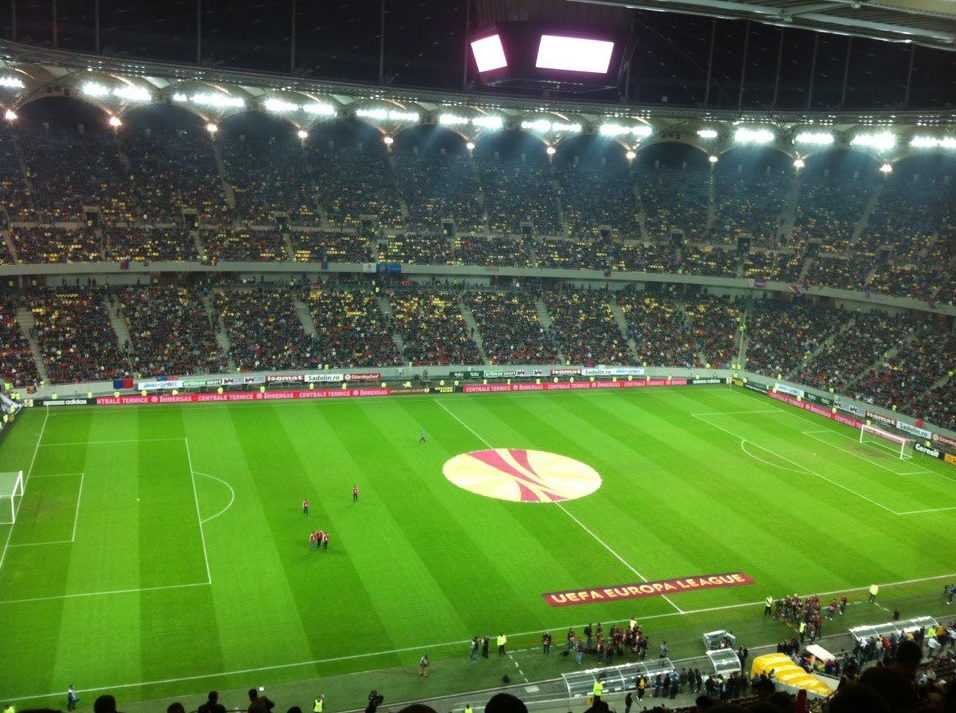
- Location: Basarabia Blvd., Nr. 37-39 Sector 2, Bucharest, Romania
- Owner: Municipality of Bucharest
- Capacity: 55,634
- Field size: 105 m × 68 m (115 yd × 74 yd)

Construction
- Groundbreaking: 20 February 2008
- Opened: 6 September 2011
- Architect: Gerkan, Marg and Partners

Steaua played the first three matches in its history at the defunct Venus stadium. Opened in 1931, the venue had previously been in the property of Venus București, a club disbanded in 1949. After that ground's demolition through order of the Communist regime, Steaua played its home matches at any one of Bucharest's three largest multi-use stadia: ANEF, Republicii (built in 1926 and demolished in 1984 to make room for the erection of the Casa Poporului) and 23 August (built in 1953). Of these two, 23 August (later renamed Național) was mostly used when two matches between Bucharest clubs were scheduled in the same matchday or for important European matches, while Republicii for regular matches in the championship.

From 1974 to 2015, Steaua played its home matches at the Stadionul Ghencea, a football stadium situated in South-Western Bucharest. Part of Complexul Sportiv Steaua, it was inaugurated on 9 April 1974 when Steaua played a friendly match against OFK Beograd, at which time it was the first football-only stadium ever built in Communist Romania, with no track & field facilities. The stadium was built through order of the Ministry of National Defence inside a former military base and was long used by CSA Steaua.

The original capacity was 30,000 on benches. A general renovation occurred in 1991; this included installing seats, which dropped the capacity to 28,365. After a second renovation in 2006,

Ghencea was able to host UEFA Champions League events, being a Category 3 arena according to the UEFA classification system.

The Romania national team was also a tenant for numerous fixtures.

From 2011, Steaua played European games and its most important domestic games at the newly constructed Arena Națională, and from March 2015, played exclusively at the Arena Națională. It also uses Steaua Stadium for selected matches.

=== Training facilities ===
Baza Sportivă ARCOM is a sports complex in Bucharest, Romania. It is currently used only for football matches, is the home ground of FCSB II and FCSB Academy and also used for trainings. The football complex was built by George Becali on the place of the former ARCOM Concrete Plant, after his club was kicked out from Steaua Stadium and Ghencea Sports Complex due to the conflict with Ministry of National Defence and CSA Steaua București. The football complex has 4 grounds (3 with a grass pitch and 1 with an artificial turf) and holds 1,000 people.

== Support ==
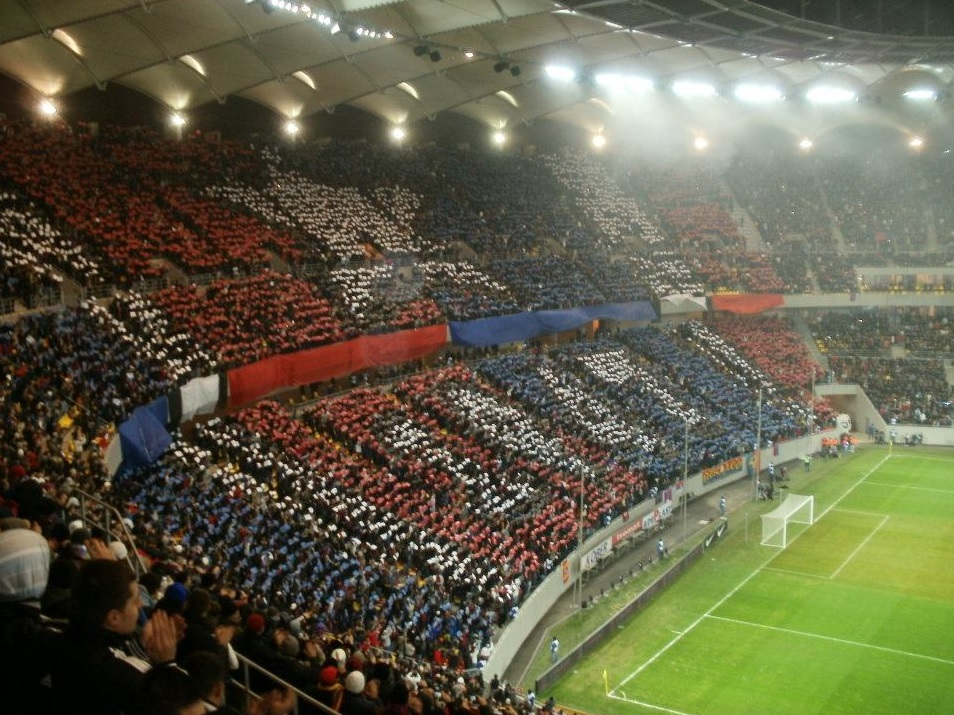
Choreography at the Peluza Nord in 2011

Steaua has the largest number of supporters of any team in Romania. A survey conducted in June 2007 suggested that the club accounts for approximately 42% of all Romanian football lovers, far greater than the teams ranked second and third, Dinamo București, with 12%, and Rapid București, with 9%.

The largest concentration of fans are in Bucharest, notably in areas adjacent to the arena, covering the whole southern half of Bucharest, a city geographically divided by the Dâmbovița River. Also, the club has an important fan base inside the country, where several towns are renowned for counting vast majorities of Steaua supporters, and outside the borders, among Romanian emigrants.

The Steaua Ultras movement began in 1995, when the bases of Armata Ultra (AU), the first Ultras group from Bucharest (and second in Romania after Politehnica Timișoara's Commando Viola Ultra Curva Sud), were set. The group quickly reached an impressive number of members, but, in 2001, they dissolved due to internal problems. Steaua's supporters then divided into several groups, some of them being located at the Peluza Nord ("North End" – Titan Boys, Nucleo, Insurgenții 1998, Skins 1996, Combat, Armata 47 Vest), while some other ones taking their place at the Peluza Sud ("South End" – Vacarm, Glas, E.R.A., Hunters, Outlaws, Shadows, Roosters, T.K., Tinerii Sudiști). Several important groups such as Stil Ostil, Ultras, Banda Ultra' and South Boys retired from attending Steaua's matches due to the club's constant abuses towards them and, mainly, to the current ownership of Steaua.

More recently, as of 2006, the supporters have formed their own official association, called AISS (Asociația Independentă a Suporterilor Steliști – "Steaua Supporters' Independent Association"). AISS was formed as a legal entity with its stated goals of "protecting the interests and image of Steaua supporters", as well as "identifying and promoting the club's perennial values".

Steaua's Peluza Nord and Peluza Sud fan groups no longer support the current team, as a sign of protest. The Peluza Sud have instead started to attend the matches of CSA Steaua. However, an online poll conducted by Sport.ro in 2017 has shown that of the 120,000 voters, 95% consider FCSB to hold the real Steaua identity. As soon as the leader of the Skins Berceni group left prison, some fans of Peluza Nord returned to support the team in Liga I, FCSB. So far the groups are: Insurgentii Colentina 1998, Skins Berceni 1996, Titan Boys 1996, North boys 2022 and Nucleo 47.

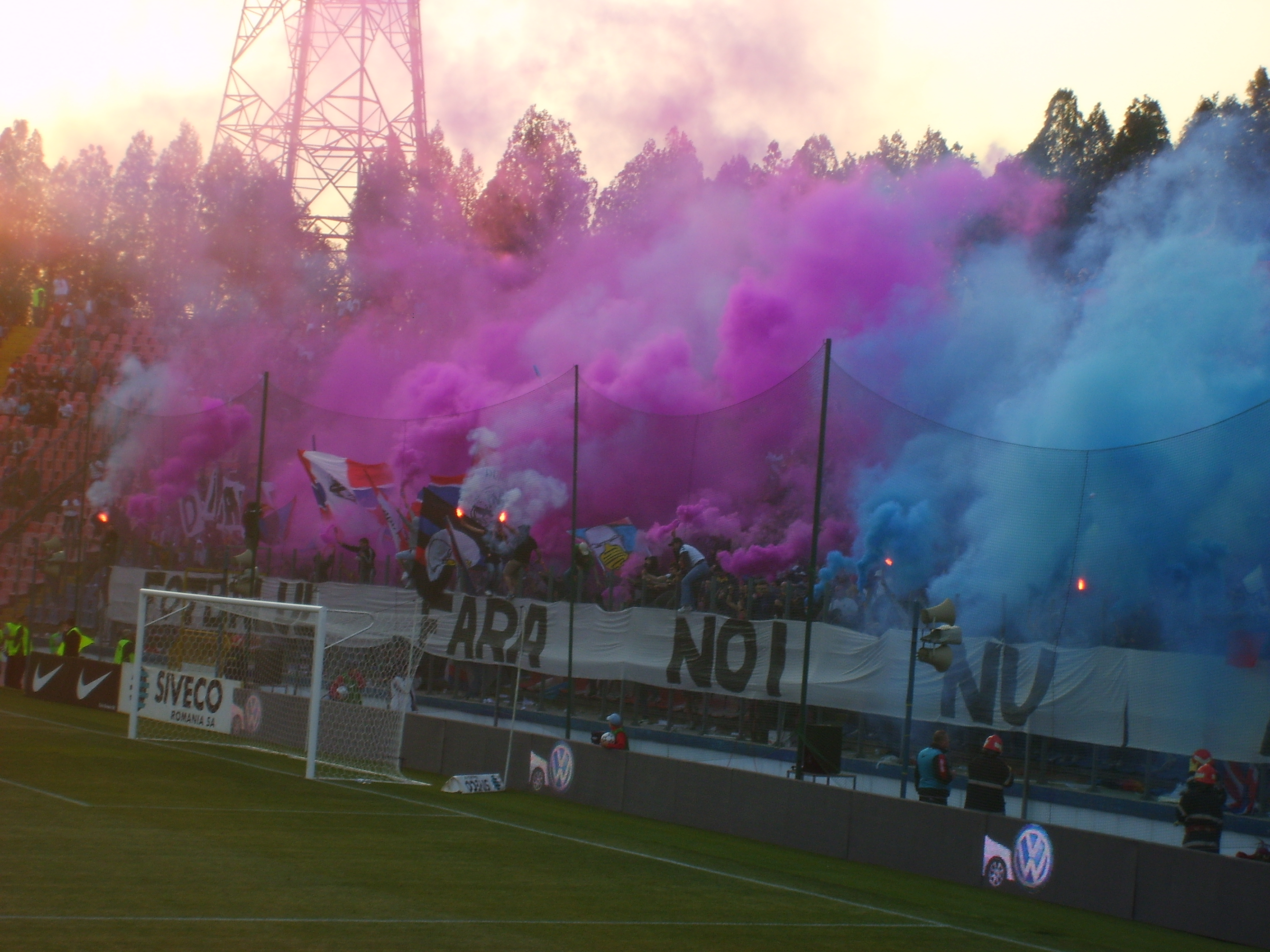
Peluza Nord in 2008

As Steaua is the most popular club in Romania, there are, besides Bucharest, several cities counting a great majority of red and blue supporters among football lovers. Widely speaking, these cities are predominant in the Eastern half of the country, particularly in the regions of Moldavia, Greater Wallachia and Northern Dobruja. Cities such as Suceava, Piatra Neamț, Bacău, Galați (inside Moldavia), Constanța (Northern Dobruja), Buzău, Brăila, Târgoviște, Călărași (Greater Wallachia), Râmnicu Vâlcea, Târgu Jiu (Oltenia), Brașov, Oradea, Sibiu, Târgu Mureș or Petroșani (Transylvania) enjoy a great majority of Steaua fans which are often well-received even by fans of the local teams.

The club is also popular outside the borders, notably between Romanian emigrants. The Valencian Community in Spain accounts for an important number of supporters, being the most important area for this matter.

Steaua fans are also maintaining good relations with the fans of CSKA Sofia of Bulgaria, with whom they share the common root of once representing the teams of their national armies. The bases of these relations date from a UEFA Cup encounter in 2004 between the two clubs. Some ultras are also friends with the ultras from UTA Arad, Corvinul Hunedoara and Farul Constanța, NEC Nijmegen, PAOK FC, CSKA Moscow and Partizan Belgrade. Also, European encounters against Panathinaikos in 1998 and Slavia Praha in 1999 were premises for setting contacts with rival fans of Olympiacos of Greece and Sparta Prague of Czech Republic respectively.

== Club rivalries ==
=== Eternul Derby ===
Steaua's most important rivalry is the one against Dinamo București. Eternul derby ("The Eternal Derby") has been the leading Romanian football encounter since 1948, as Steaua and Dinamo are the two most successful football teams in the country. There have been more than 150 matches played so far between Steaua and Dinamo in the Romanian League, the Romanian Cup and also the Romanian Supercup. With 44 titles combined (Steaua – 26; Dinamo – 18), the two sides have won 36 more than the third-most successful Liga I club, Venus București.

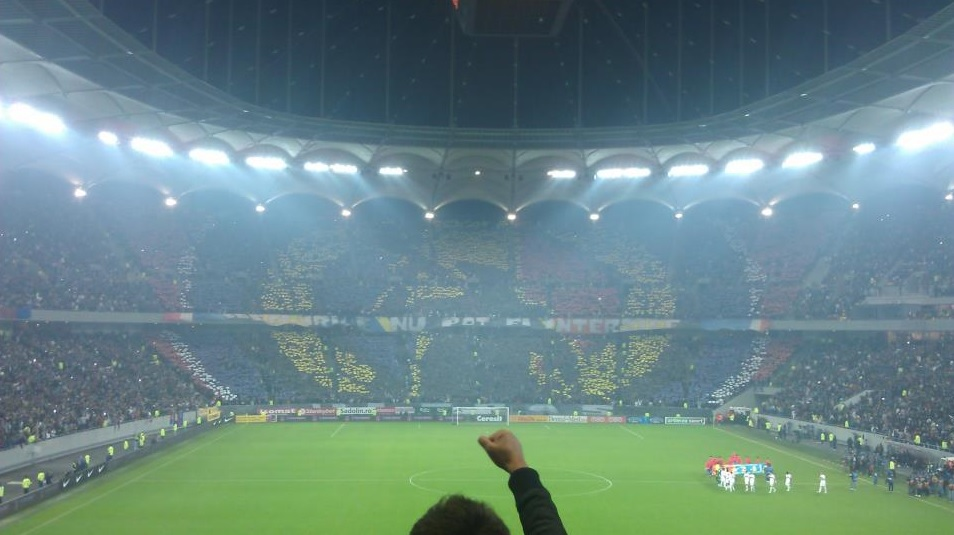
An Eternal derby played at the Arena Națională

It is also a match between the former clubs of the Romanian Army (Steaua) and the Ministry of Internal Affairs (Dinamo). Several clashes between different factions of supporters have often occurred and still occur inside and outside the stadium. The heyday was reached before a match kick-off in 1997, when Dinamo's fans set a sector of Stadionul Ghencea's Peluza Sud, where they were assigned, on fire. On 16 August 2016, during Steaua's Champions League play-off 0–5 loss to Manchester City, undercover Dinamo fans displayed a huge message saying Doar Dinamo București ("Only Dinamo Bucharest"), which was labelled one of the biggest pranks in football history.

Between October 1991 and April 2000, Steaua counted 19 undefeated official matches facing their rivals, both in the championship and the cup. Also, a period of 17 years and 7 months has been recorded in which Dinamo failed to win away against Steaua in the domestic league.

=== Bucharest Derby ===
The second-most important rivalry was with Rapid București, often called Bucharest derby. Several matches throughout the years between Steaua and Rapid have also ended in serious clashes between fans.The two clubs have met over 140 times, starting with Rapid's 1–0 win on 4 November 1947. The conflict has become even fiercer after Steaua outpassed Rapid in an all-Romanian quarter-final of the 2005–06 UEFA Cup.The conflict between the fans has become even fiercer since then. The rivalry also extends to other sports. The local sports newspapers said that the two teams were linked up in this quarter-final by the line of the number 41 tram which links the Ghencea Stadium to the Valentin Stănescu Stadium. The rivalry also extends to other sports.

Milder and historical rivalries are also with non-Bucharest-based teams, such as CFR Cluj, Universitatea Craiova, Politehnica Timișoara, Petrolul Ploiești, Universitatea Cluj and a recent one with Astra Giurgiu.

== Controversies ==
=== Racism and xenophobia ===
During the year 2025, Siyabonga Ngezana faced racial slurs and racist remarks at FCSB from the owner and the fans too. George Becali, the owner of Ngezana's current club FCSB, made several discriminatory and racist remarks. He publicly stated he would stop signing African players because, in his opinion, "they have no civilization" and "cannot be understood". He also reportedly called Ngezana names such as "ugly monkey" and suggested he wouldn't hire Africans in the future.

Ngezana has shared screenshots of vile, hateful messages he received on social media from fans. These messages included racial slurs like "f*cking monkey" and threats of injury. The abuse often came after matches, particularly following FCSB's victory over PAOK in a European tournament. After the victory against PAOK, the fan of the losing side attacked him on Instagram and the fan promised that Ngezana will cry and PAOK will thrash FCSB 4-0 the next time they would meet, he also said he wished he broke his leg on the replies of Instagram stories.

== Ownership and finances ==
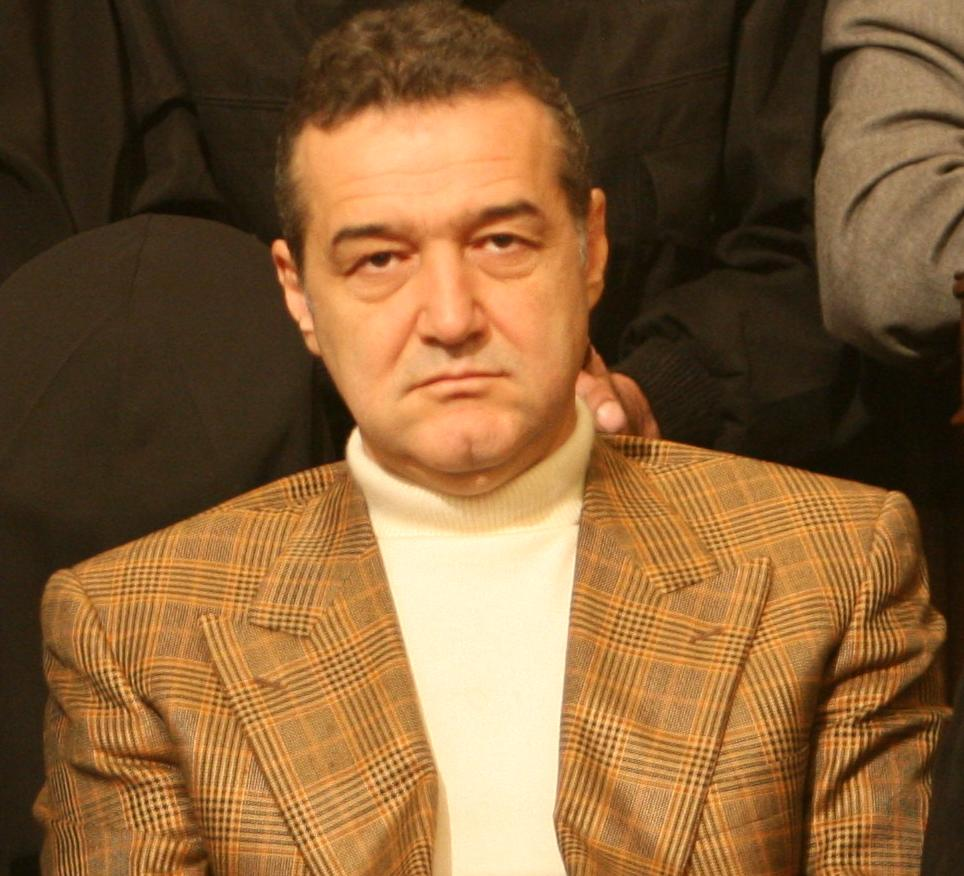
Gigi Becali, the controversial owner of FCSB since 2003.

Steaua has previously been known as the club of the Romanian Army, which founded it in 1947 as a sports society. The Army continues to own the sports society, named CSA Steaua București. The football department, however, separated and turned private in 1998, owned and financed by a non-profit organization called AFC Steaua București, chaired by businessman Viorel Păunescu.

In January 2003, the team turned public under the leadership of investor and former politician George Becali, who had already purchased 51% of the society's shares and later on acquired the rest to become the owner of the club. At present, Becali has no official links with FCSB, as he gradually renounced his shares. However, the facts that the current shareholders, that include several nephews of his, are people loyal to him and that he is still in charge of FCSB are obvious. An unofficial explanation for this situation is represented by the heavy amount of unpaid taxes added up by the former governing company, AFC Steaua București, whose payment towards the tax authority was avoided this way by transferring its assets to the new-formed company, with the old association going on liquidation bankruptcy.

George "Gigi" Becali is a highly controversial figure at FCSB, whose involvement in the life of the club and the team has often been described as authoritarian and dictatorial by both the media and the fans.

== Statistics and records ==
FCSB currently boasts itself with the most impressive pedigree in Romania. With 75 seasons spent in Liga I, they are one of only two teams to have played only in the first national league, along with Dinamo București (71 seasons). At the same time, the club is the current record holder for the number of national championships (27), national cups (24), national super cups (6) and the national league cup (2). Between 1993 and 1998, its run of six consecutive national titles won equaled the one of Chinezul Timișoara from the 1920s. Internationally, it is the only Romanian club to have won continental trophies (the European Champions Cup in 1986 and the European Super Cup in 1986) and to have played in the final of the European Cup (in 1986 and 1989). It is the only Romanian club that from 2002 to 2018 managed to qualify in the groups of a European competition

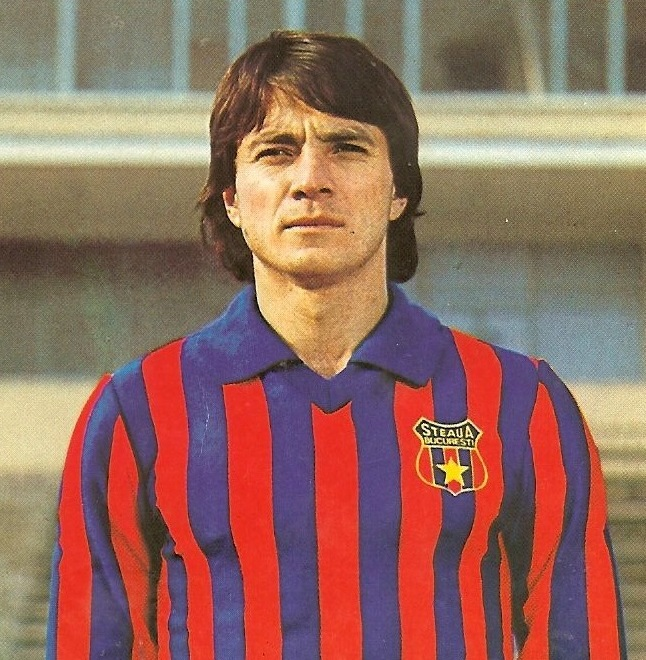
Tudorel Stoica made 370 total appearances for FCSB, a club record.

For three years and three months (June 1986 – September 1989), FCSB counted a number of 104 unbeaten matches in the league, establishing, at that moment, a world record and a European one still standing. Also inside the national league, the club counted 112 matches between November 1989 and August 1996 of invincibility at Stadionul Ghencea in Liga I. Its run of 17-straight wins in 1988 is another record, equal to the one held by Dinamo as of one year later.

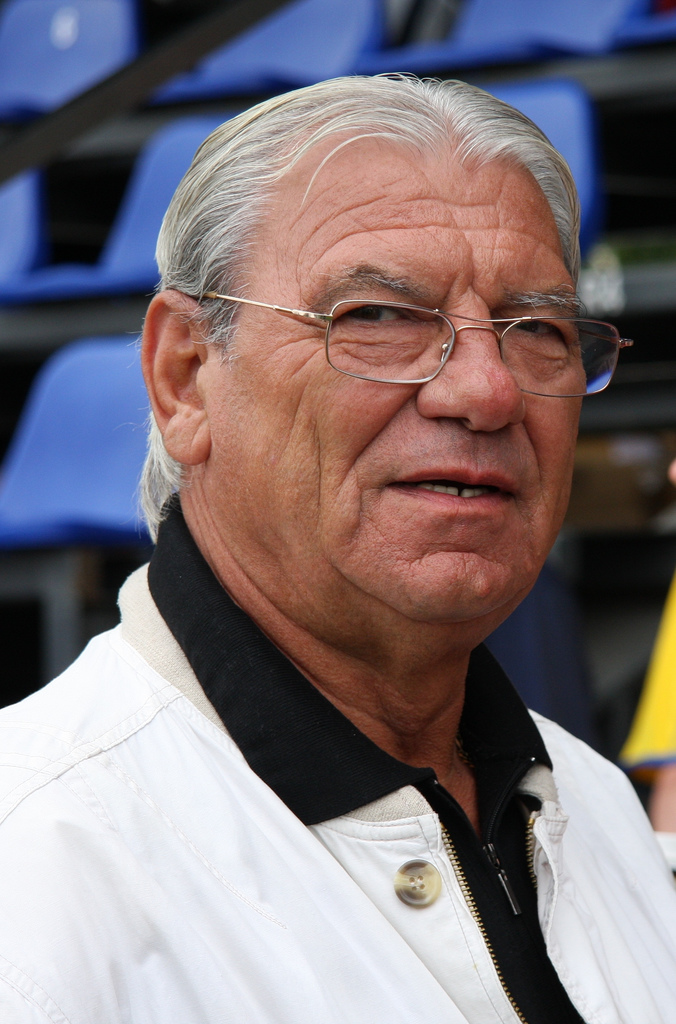
Emerich Jenei won the club nine domestic honours and the 1985–86 European Cup.

Tudorel Stoica is the player with the most appearances for FCSB in Liga I, a record unlikely to be broken in the nearby future, as none of the current players have entered the top-ten so far. The club's all-time top scorer in the league is Anghel Iordănescu with 146 goals, a record that also looks solid, out of the same reason as above-mentioned. Other records are currently owned by former players such as Dorinel Munteanu (most national caps – 134) or Gheorghe Hagi (most goals scored for Romania – 35; most appearances of a Romanian player in the European cups – 93). FCSB's longest serving manager is Anghel Iordanescu, with four consecutive years in two spells (1986–1990) and (1992–1993), and Emerich Jenei is the club's most successful manager winning the European Cup in 1986. The most successful FCSB player is Marius Lacatus with 21 trophies, surpassing Tudorel Stoica, with 14 trophies.

FCSB's Arena Nationala is the largest stadium in Romania. The club's highest home attendance was 50,016 in a Europa League quarter-final against Chelsea in 2012–13 season. The modernisation of Ghencea stadium during the 2018–20 and the build of a new stadium make the Ghencea stadium one of the biggest in Romania with a capacity of 31,254 being inaugurated on 7 July 2021, with a match between CSA Steaua and OFK Beograd, the same team with whom they had inaugurated the previous stadium back in 1974. It ended with a 6–0 win for the home team. In August 2018, FCSB signed Florinel Coman from FC Viitorul Constanta for €3 million, the highest transfer fee in club's history. In January 2021, FCSB player Dennis Man transferred to Parma Calcio 1913 for a romanian record transfer fee of €13 million. Other records were set by former player Gheorghe Hagi transfer set the record for the transfer fee from the domestic league to a foreign club, with $4,300,000 paid by Real Madrid CF in 1990. On 18 September 2014, in a 2014–15 UEFA Europa League group stage match against Danish side Aalborg BK, FCSB set two competition records: Claudiu Keșerü scored three goals in a span of only 12 minutes, this being the fastest hat-trick in the history of the competition, and with the 6–0 victory over Aalborg BK, Steaua achieved the highest score in the history of the UEFA Europa League, also being the first team to manages to score 6 goals in one match.

== Popular culture ==
As Steaua is currently the most popular football team in Romania, a good number of musicians or TV and film directors have inspired themselves from ideas linked to the Ghencea-based club. Popular reference, however, appeared only after the Romanian Revolution, as before, mass-media programmes were mostly being controlled by the former communist regime. The 2002 Romanian film Furia depicts scenes in which Steaua and Dinamo gangs of supporters are fighting on the streets after a direct match between the two sides. Prima TV comedy show Mondenii often airs sketches parodying Steaua owner George Becali, the players and other representatives around the club. Pro TV series La bloc aired an episode in which characters Nelu and Costel are displayed as representing Steaua in a parking lot match against two other neighbours representing Dinamo.

Several other examples from music can be attributed as Steaua-related. Apart from club anthems played throughout time by Marcel Pavel, Bere Gratis, Gaz pe Foc, an album was released in 2006 as a compilation by Mircea Vintilă, Chicanos, Bogdan Dima and several other artists. Delikt and Ultras are two former hip hop bands whose members ranked the defunct Armata Ultra' brigade and would always show up displaying fan materials. Also, Voltaj, in their song 'MSD2', make reference to the fans in the line "Poți să fii câine sau poți fi stelist" ("You can be a dog or you can be a Steaua fan").

One of the most famous pop-culture references about the club is the association with Scooter's song Maria, first sung spontaneously in 2003 by the fans in Peluza Nord after the team would score. Ever since, it has been adopted as an unofficial club anthem and is being played at the stadium at every match, sung together by the supporters. Nonetheless, the song is beginning to lose popularity, mainly because it has become too commercial and many fans do not feel bonded with it any more.

== Honours ==
Note: As of June 2018, UEFA and LPF regard FCSB as the continuation of historical FC Steaua București and attribute all honours since 1947 to this entity. However, the ownership of the many trophies won between 1947 and 2003 is disputed, with the restarted football department of former parent club CSA Steaua also claiming them following legal disputes between the two organisations. In July 2019, CSA Steaua won a first court decision regarding the record dispute. However, the ruling is not definitive. In June 2021, the Bucharest Court of Appeal decided that CSA Steaua only holds the record from 1947 to 1998 (and not from 1947 to 2003). However, FC FCSB has the right to appeal within 30 days. See Steaua București football records dispute for more information.

Type	Competition	Titles	Seasons
Domestic	Divizia A / Liga I	28	1951, 1952, 1953, 1956, 1959–60, 1960–61, 1967–68, 1975–76, 1977–78, 1984–85, 1985–86, 1986–87, 1987–88, 1988–89, 1992–93, 1993–94, 1994–95, 1995–96, 1996–97, 1997–98, 2000–01, 2004–05, 2005–06, 2012–13, 2013–14, 2014–15, 2023–24, 2024–25
Domestic	Cupa României	23	1948–49, 1950, 1951, 1952, 1955, 1961–62, 1965–66, 1966–67, 1968–69, 1969–70, 1970–71, 1975–76, 1978–79, 1984–85, 1986–87, 1987–88, 1988–89, 1991–92, 1995–96, 1996–97, 1998–99, 2010–11, 2014–15, 2019–20
Domestic	Supercupa României	8	1994, 1995, 1998, 2001, 2006, 2013, 2024, 2025
Domestic	Cupa Ligii	2	2014–15, 2015–16
Continental	European Cup	1	1985–86
Continental	European Super Cup	1	1986

- Record
- ^{S} Shared record

== Players ==
=== Current squad ===
As of 26 October 2026

Note: Flags indicate national team as defined under FIFA eligibility rules; some limited exceptions apply. Players may hold more than one non-FIFA nationality.

No.	Pos.	Nation	Player
2	DF	ROU	Valentin Crețu (4th captain)
3	DF	POR	André Duarte
4	DF	ROU	Ricardo Pădurariu
5	DF	CMR	Joyskim Dawa
7	FW	KOS	Meriton Korenica
8	MF	FRA	Eddy Gnahoré
10	FW	ROU	Denis Drăguș (Captain)
11	FW	ROU	David Miculescu
13	GK	ROU	Matei Popa
14	FW	CMR	Arnold Garita (on loan from Shenzhen Juniors)
15	MF	ISR	Ofri Arad
17	DF	ROU	Mihai Popescu

No.	Pos.	Nation	Player
18	MF	CPV	João Paulo
19	FW	ROU	David Avram
20	FW	ROU	Dennis Politic
21	DF	COD	Dylan Batubinsika
28	FW	ALG	Aymen Boutoutaou
31	MF	ITA	Juri Cisotti (3rd captain)
32	GK	ROU	Ștefan Târnovanu
33	DF	MNE	Risto Radunović
34	GK	ROU	Mihai Udrea
73	MF	CRO	Karlo Muhar (vice-captain)
77	DF	ROU	Luca Stancu
97	DF	MTQ	Ronny Labonne

=== Dual registration ===
Note: Flags indicate national team as defined under FIFA eligibility rules; some limited exceptions apply. Players may hold more than one non-FIFA nationality.

No.	Pos.	Nation	Player
1	GK	ROU	Rareș Andrei (at Concordia Chiajna)
6	DF	ROU	Andrei Dăncuș (at Concordia Chiajna)
22	MF	ROU	Mihai Toma (at Concordia Chiajna)

No.	Pos.	Nation	Player
90	FW	ROU	Alexandru Stoian (at Concordia Chiajna)
98	FW	ROU	David Popa (at Concordia Chiajna)

=== Other players under contract ===
Note: Flags indicate national team as defined under FIFA eligibility rules; some limited exceptions apply. Players may hold more than one non-FIFA nationality.

No.	Pos.	Nation	Player
30	DF	RSA	Siyabonga Ngezana

=== Out on loan ===
Note: Flags indicate national team as defined under FIFA eligibility rules; some limited exceptions apply. Players may hold more than one non-FIFA nationality.

No.	Pos.	Nation	Player
23	DF	ROU	Ionuț Cercel (at Farul Constanța until 30 June 2027)
—	DF	ROU	Raul Alecsandroaie (at Metalul Buzău until 30 June 2027)
—	DF	ROU	Luca Galdea (at ASA Târgu Mureș until 30 June 2027)
—	DF	ROU	Alexandru Pantea (at Levadiakos until 30 June 2027)
—	MF	ROU	Octavian Popescu (at Levadiakos until 30 June 2027)

No.	Pos.	Nation	Player
—	MF	ROU	Codruț Călin (at Progresul Fundulea until 30 June 2027)
—	MF	ROU	Eric Damașcan (at Popești-Leordeni until 30 June 2027)
—	MF	ROU	Andrei Panait (at Înainte Modelu until 30 June 2027)
—	FW	ROU	Daniel Bîrligea (at Frosinone until 30 June 2027)
—	FW	ROU	Robert Necșulescu (at Unirea Slobozia until 30 June 2027)

== Club officials ==
=== Board of directors ===
Role	Name
Owner	(Romania) George Becali
President	(Romania) Valeriu Argăseală
Vice-President	(Romania) Iulian Ghiorghișor
Sporting Director	(Poland) Łukasz Szukała
Team Manager	(Romania) Marius Ianuli
Marketing Officer	(Romania) Tănase Culețu
Head of Youth Development	(Romania) Raul Rusescu
Secretary	(Romania) Sorin Pitu
Security Officer	(Romania) Adrian Ianuli
Press Officer	(Romania) Cătălin Făiniși

- Last updated: 18 November 2026

=== Current technical staff ===
Role	Name
Head coach	(Romania) Laurențiu Reghecampf
Assistant coaches	(Romania) Viorel Dinu (Romania) Costin Curelea (Romania) Mihai Pintilii
Goalkeeping coach	(Romania) Marius Popa
Fitness coaches	(Romania) Horea Codorean (Germany) Thomas Neubert (Romania) Adrian Popa
Video analyst	(Romania) Ionuț Zottu
Club doctor	(Romania) Flavian Arămitu
Medical Assistant	(Romania) Costică Moroiu
Physiotherapists	(Romania) Sorin Cristof (Romania) Cristian Ștefu
Kinetotherapist	(Romania) Ovidiu Kurti
Masseurs	(Romania) Cătălin Făndel (Romania) Aurel Neacșu

- Last updated: 19 November 2026

== Notable coaches ==
The following coaches have all won at least one major trophy with Steaua București:

Table correct as of 4 July 2024

Name	Period	Trophies
(Romania) Colea Vâlcov	08.1948–07.1949	Romanian Cup
(Romania) Francisc Rónay	03.1950–11.1950; 09.1953–11.1953; 03.1954–06.1954	Romanian Cup
(Romania) Gheorghe Popescu	03.1951–08.1953; 08.1958–07.1960; 03.1962–07.1962	4 Divizia A, 3 Romanian Cups
(Romania) Ilie Savu	09.1954–11.1955; 1958; 08.1964–06.1967	3 Romanian Cups
(Romania) Ștefan Dobay	03.1956–11.1956	Divizia A
(Romania) Ștefan Onisie	09.1960–06.1961; 08.1962–11.1963; 08.1970–06.1971	Divizia A, Romanian Cup
(Romania) Ștefan Covaci	08.1967–07.1970	Divizia A, 2 Romanian Cups
(Romania) Gheorghe Constantin	03.1973–12.1973; 08.1978–06.1981	Romanian Cup
(Romania) Emerich Jenei	08.1975–06.1978; 08.1983–05.1984; 10.1984–10.1986; 04.1991–12.1991; 08.1993–04.1994; 10.1998–04.2000	5 Divizia A, 3 Romanian Cups, European Cup
(Romania) Anghel Iordănescu	10.1986–06.1990; 08.1992–06.1993	4 Divizia A, 2 Romanian Cups, European Super Cup
(Romania) Victor Pițurcă	03.1992–06.1992; 08.2000–06.2002; 10.2002–06.2004; 07.2010–08.2010	Divizia A, Romanian Cup, Romanian Supercup
(Romania) Dumitru Dumitriu	08.1994–06.1997; 05.2005–06.2005; 09.2015–12.2015	4 Divizia A, 2 Romanian Cups, 2 Romanian Supercups
(Romania) Mihai Stoichiță	08.1997–10.1998; 09.2009–05.2010; 03.2012–05.2012	Divizia A, Romanian Supercup
(Romania) Cosmin Olăroiu	08.2002–10.2002; 03.2006–05.2007	Divizia A, Romanian Supercup
(Romania) Gabriel Caramarin^{1}	05.2011	Romanian Cup
(Romania) Laurențiu Reghecampf	05.2012–05.2014; 12.2015–05.2017	2 Liga I, League Cup, Romanian Supercup
(Romania) Constantin Gâlcă	06.2014–06.2015	Liga I, Romanian Cup, League Cup
(Romania) Anton Petrea	07.2020–05.2021; 11.2021–07.2022	Romanian Cup
(Cyprus) Elias Charalambous	03.2023-03.2026	2 Liga I, Romanian Supercup

== See also ==
- Football in Romania
- List of unbeaten football club seasons
- European football club records
