= Luca Stancu =

Romanian footballer (born 2005)

Personal information
- Full name: Luca Gabriel Stancu
- Date of birth: 9 May 2005 (age 21)
- Place of birth: Bucharest, Romania
- Height: 1.80 m (5 ft 11 in)
- Position: Full-back

Team information
- Current team: FCSB
- Number: 77

Youth career
- –2013: FC Pitești 2008
- 2013–2016: Viitorul Argeș Alexandru Duminică
- 2016–2017: FC Pitești 2008
- 2016–2017: → Albota 2008 (loan)
- 2017: LPS Pitești
- 2017–2020: Argeș Pitești
- 2020–2022: FC Pitești 2008
- 2020–2021: → LPS Pitești (loan)

Senior career*
Years	Team	Apps	(Gls)
2022–2025	AFC Câmpulung Muscel	71	(7)
2025–2026	Hermannstadt	29	(2)
2026–	FCSB	4	(0)
- * Club domestic league appearances and goals as of 7 November 2026

Luca Gabriel Stancu (born 9 May 2005) is a Romanian professional footballer who plays as a full-back for Liga I club FCSB.

== Career statistics ==
As of 7 November 2026

Appearances and goals by club, season and competition
Club	Season	League			Cupa României		Europe		Other		Total	
Club	Season	Division	Apps	Goals	Apps	Goals	Apps	Goals	Apps	Goals	Apps	Goals
AFC Câmpulung Muscel	2022–23	Liga III	22	0	—		—		—		22	0
AFC Câmpulung Muscel	2023–24	Liga III	26	7	3	0	—		4 (Note: Appearances in Liga III promotion play-offs)	0	33	7
AFC Câmpulung Muscel	2024–25	Liga II	23	0	3	0	—		—		26	0
AFC Câmpulung Muscel	Total		71	7	6	0	—		4	0	81	7
Hermannstadt	2025–26	Liga I	29	2	3	0	—		2 (Note: Appearances in Liga I promotion/relegation play-offs)	0	34	2
FCSB	2026–27	Liga I	4	0	2	0	0	0	—		6	0
Career total			104	9	11	0	—		4	0	119	9

== Honours ==
AFC Câmpulung Muscel

- Liga III: 2023–24
