= Ronny Labonne =

Martiniquais footballer (born 1997)

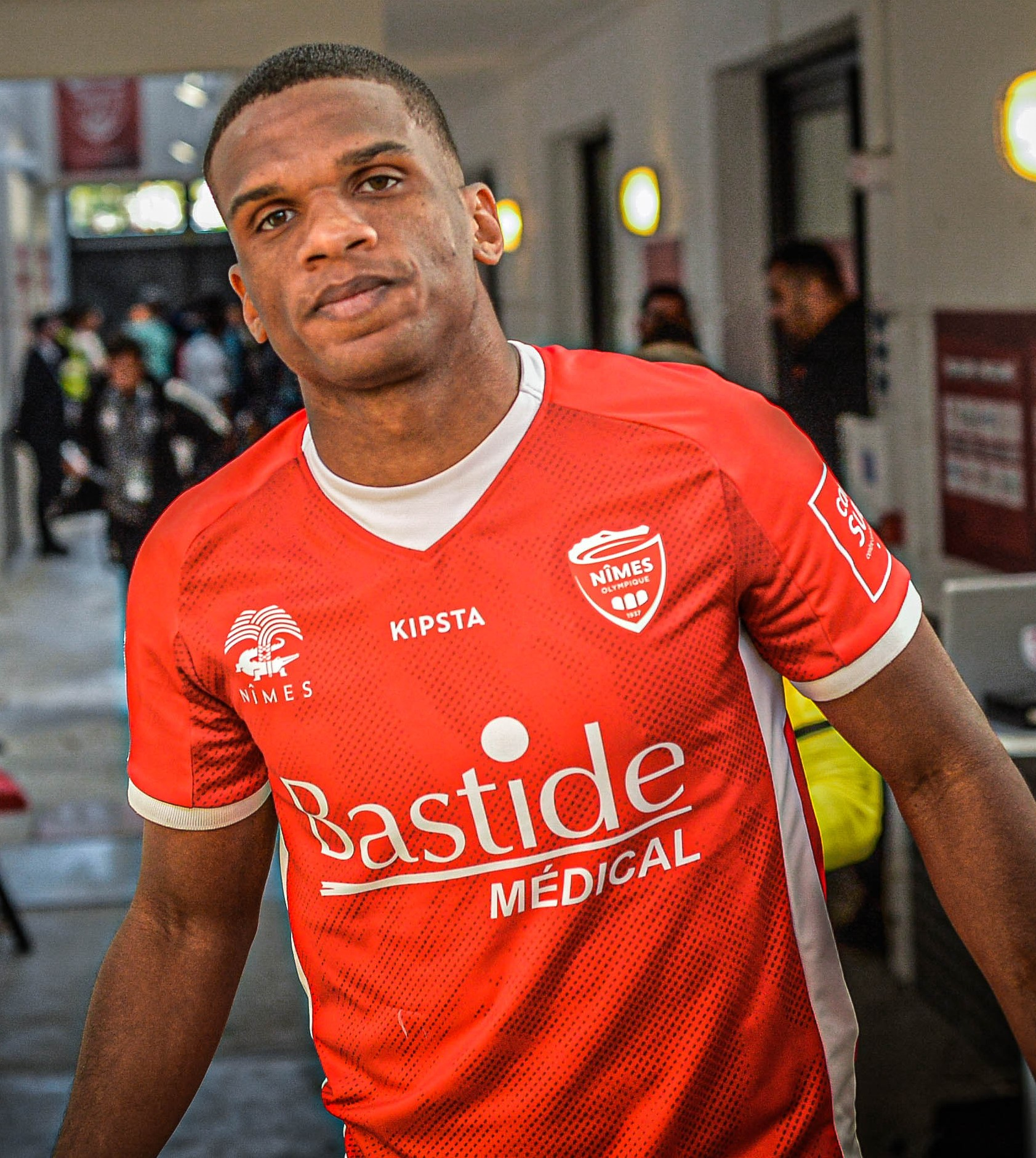
- Labonne in 2022

Personal information
- Full name: Ronny Joel André Labonne
- Date of birth: 14 September 1997 (age 29)
- Place of birth: Le Lamentin, Martinique
- Height: 1.80 m (5 ft 11 in)
- Position: Right-back

Team information
- Current team: FCSB
- Number: 97

Youth career
- 2002–2012: US Robert
- 2012–2013: JA Drancy
- 2013–2014: Vaulx-en-Velin
- 2014–2016: Lyon La Duchère

Senior career*
Years	Team	Apps	(Gls)
2018–2019	Lyon La Duchère B	12	(6)
2018–2019	Lyon La Duchère	16	(0)
2019–2020	Saint-Priest	12	(1)
2020–2022	Lorient B	31	(1)
2022–2025	Nîmes	60	(0)
2025–2026	Caen	24	(1)
2026–	FCSB	6	(0)

International career^{‡}
2023–	Martinique	9	(0)
- * Club domestic league appearances and goals as of 7 November 2026 ‡ National team caps and goals as of 2 October 2026

Ronny Joel André Labonne (born 14 September 1997) is a Martiniquais professional footballer who plays as a right-back for Liga I club FCSB and the Martinique national team.

== Club ==
Labonnne is a youth product of the Martiniquais club US Robert, before moving to mainland France with the academies of JA Drancy, Vaulx-en-Velin, and Lyon La Duchère. He began his senior career with Lyon La Duchère in the Championnat National in 2018. He transferred to Saint-Priest on 2 August 2019. The following season, he moved to the reserves of FC Lorient signing a professional contract.

On 20 June 2022, he transferred to Nîmes. He made his professional debut with Nîmes as a late substitute in a 1–0 Ligue 2 loss to Caen on 30 July 2022.

On 4 June 2025, Labonne joined Championnat National side Caen following their relegation.

== Career statistics ==
=== Club ===
As of 7 November 2026

Appearances and goals by club, season and competition
Club	Season	League			National cup (Note: Includes Coupe de France, Cupa României)		Europe		Other		Total	
Club	Season	Division	Apps	Goals	Apps	Goals	Apps	Goals	Apps	Goals	Apps	Goals
Lyon La Duchère b	2016–17	Régional 1	?	?	—		—		—		?	?
Lyon La Duchère b	2017–18	Régional 1	?	?	—		—		—		?	?
Lyon La Duchère b	2018–19	Championnat National 3	12	6	—		—		—		12	6
Lyon La Duchère b	Total		12	6	—		—		—		12	6
Lyon La Duchère	2017–18	Championnat National	3	0	1	0	—		—		4	0
Lyon La Duchère	2018–19	Championnat National	13	0	4	0	—		—		17	0
Lyon La Duchère	2019–20	Championnat National	0	0	—		—		—		0	0
Lyon La Duchère	Total		16	0	5	0	—		—		21	0
Saint-Priest	2019–20	Championnat National 2	12	1	—		—		—		12	1
Lorient B	2020–21	Championnat National 2	5	0	—		—		—		5	0
Lorient B	2021–22	Championnat National 2	26	1	—		—		—		26	1
Lorient B	Total		31	1	—		—		—		31	1
Nîmes	2022–23	Ligue 2	32	0	3	0	—		—		35	0
Nîmes	2023–24	Championnat National	10	0	1	1	—		—		11	1
Nîmes	2024–25	Championnat National	18	0	0	0	—		—		18	0
Nîmes	Total		60	0	4	1	—		—		64	1
Caen	2025–26	Championnat National	24	1	2	1	—		—		26	2
FCSB	2026–27	Liga I	6	0	2	0	1 (Note: Appearance in UEFA Conference League)	0	—		9	0
Career total			161	9	13	2	1	0	0	0	175	11

=== International ===
As of match played 2 October 2026

Appearances and goals by national team and year
National team	Year	Apps	Goals
Martinique	2023	6	0
Martinique	2026	3	0
Total		9	0
