= 2017–18 SC Juventus București season =

Juventus București
2017–18 season
- President: Gheorghe Chivorchian
- Manager: Daniel Oprița, Marin Barbu (caretaker), Marius Baciu
- Stadium: Juventus / Ilie Oană / Anghel Iordănescu
- Liga I: 14th
- Cupa României: Round of 16
- Top goalscorer: League: Simon Măzărache (3); All: Simon Măzărache (3)
- Highest home attendance: 7,000 vs Dinamo București (15 July 2017, Liga I)
- Lowest home attendance: 27 vs Poli Timișoara (6 November 2017, Liga I)
Home colours	Away colours	Third colours

This page covers all relevant details regarding SC Juventus București for all official competitions inside the 2017–18 season.

== Players ==
=== First team squad ===
As of 9 March 2018

Note: Flags indicate national team as defined under FIFA eligibility rules; some limited exceptions apply. Players may hold more than one non-FIFA nationality.

No.	Pos.	Nation	Player
1	GK	ROU	Relu Stoian
2	MF	ROU	Cristian Ciobanu (on loan from Chiajna)
4	DF	ROU	Gabriel Simion (on loan from FCSB)
5	DF	BRA	Walace
6	DF	TUR	Gökhan Kardes
7	MF	ROU	Vasile Gheorghe (on loan from Chiajna)
8	MF	ROU	Cristian Balgiu (on loan from Clinceni)
10	MF	ROU	Liviu Băjenaru (Captain)
14	MF	ROU	Robert Neacșu
15	DF	ROU	Alexandru Ioniță
16	FW	ROU	Andrei Ciolacu
17	DF	ROU	Dean Beța
18	DF	ROU	Valentin Dima
19	FW	ROU	Róbert Elek

No.	Pos.	Nation	Player
20	DF	ROU	Teodor Varga
21	MF	ROU	Marian Constantinescu
23	MF	ROU	Viorel Nicoară (on loan from Astra)
25	MF	FRA	Réda Rabeï
26	FW	ROU	Adrian Manole
28	DF	ROU	Mihai Leca
29	GK	ROU	George Gavrilaș (on loan from Voluntari)
30	FW	ROU	Robert Țicămucă
31	DF	ROU	Cornel Ene
33	GK	ROU	Virgil Drăghia
70	DF	ROU	Dan Popescu
80	MF	ROU	Ciprian Petre (Vice-Captain)
88	DF	ROU	Robert Bogdan
89	MF	FRA	Charles Acolatse (on loan from Foresta)

=== Out on loan ===
Note: Flags indicate national team as defined under FIFA eligibility rules; some limited exceptions apply. Players may hold more than one non-FIFA nationality.

No.	Pos.	Nation	Player
22	DF	ROU	Iulian Carabela (to Poli Timișoara)
—	GK	ROU	Ștefan Teodorescu (to Voința Turnu Măgurele)
—	MF	ROU	Cristian Bustea (to Sportul Snagov)
—	MF	ROU	Vasile Dănilă (to Foresta Suceava)

No.	Pos.	Nation	Player
—	FW	ROU	Adrian Hurdubei (to Aerostar Bacău)
—	FW	ROU	Alexandru Muscă (to Oțelul Galați)
—	FW	ROU	Eugen Nica (to Balotești)

== Transfers ==
=== Summer ===
In:

No.	Pos.	Nation	Player
—	MF	ROU	Marian Stoenac (loan return from Cetate Deva)
—	GK	ROU	Virgil Drăghia (from Concordia Chiajna)
—	GK	POR	Pedro Mingote (from CS U Craiova)
—	DF	ROU	Alexandru Benga (from (Cyprus) Ermis Aradippou)
—	MF	ROU	Dan Bucșa (from (Israel) Hapoel Bnei Lod)
—	MF	ROU	Vasile Dănilă (from Foresta Suceava)
—	MF	GEO	Nika Dzalamidze (from (Poland) Górnik Łęczna)
—	MF	ROU	Ciprian Petre (from Gaz Metan Mediaș)
—	MF	ROU	Andrei Lungu (from (Israel) Hapoel Nir Ramat HaSharon)
—	MF	BIH	Ivan Sesar (from (Bosnia and Herzegovina) Široki Brijeg)
—	FW	ROU	Simon Măzărache (on loan from CSU Craiova)
—	FW	ROU	Cătălin Țîră (from Dunărea Călărași)

Out:

No.	Pos.	Nation	Player
—	GK	ROU	Andrei Burlui (to Free agent)
—	GK	ROU	Károly Fila (to Sportul Snagov)
—	GK	POR	Pedro Mingote (to Free agent)
—	DF	ROU	Vlad Opriș (on loan to Balotești, previously on loan at CSMȘ Reșița)
—	MF	ROU	Sorin Bustea (on loan to Sportul Snagov)
—	MF	ROU	Vasile Dănilă (on loan to Foresta Suceava)
—	MF	ROU	Andrei Rontea (to Free agent, previously on loan return to Balotești)
—	MF	ROU	Alexandru Vasile (to Oțelul Galați)
—	MF	ROU	Dan Bucșa (to Concordia Chiajna)
—	FW	ROU	Vasile Buhăescu (to Argeș Pitești)
—	FW	ROU	Bogdan Chipirliu (to Astra Giurgiu)
—	FW	ROU	Dragoș Florea (to Free agent)
—	FW	ROU	Adrian Hurdubei (to Balotești)
—	FW	ROU	Alin Ilin (to Tunari)
—	FW	ROU	George Mareș (to Free agent)
—	FW	ROU	Alexandru Muscă (to Oțelul Galați)
—	FW	ROU	Eugen Nica (on loan to Balotești)
—	FW	ROU	Alexandru Roșca (to Dunărea Călărași)

=== Winter ===
In:

No.	Pos.	Nation	Player
—	GK	ROU	George Gavrilaș (on loan from Voluntari)
—	DF	ROU	Robert Bogdan (from CS U Craiova)
—	DF	ROU	Cornel Ene (from Free agent)
—	DF	TUR	Gökhan Kardes (on loan from (Netherlands) PSV Eindhoven)
—	DF	ROU	Mihai Leca (from (Moldova) Zimbru Chișinău)
—	DF	ROU	Dan Popescu (from Steaua București)
—	DF	ROU	Gabriel Simion (on loan from Steaua București, previously on loan at Academica Clinceni)
—	MF	FRA	Charles Acolatse (on loan from Foresta Suceava)
—	MF	ROU	Cristian Balgiu (on loan from Academica Clinceni)
—	MF	ROU	Cristian Ciobanu (on loan from Concordia Chiajna)
—	MF	ROU	Marian Constantinescu (from Academica Clinceni)
—	MF	ROU	Stephan Drăghici (on loan from CS U Craiova, previously on loan at Academica Clinceni)
—	MF	ROU	Vasile Gheorghe (on loan from Concordia Chiajna)
—	MF	ROU	Viorel Nicoară (on loan from Astra Giurgiu)
—	MF	FRA	Réda Rabeï (from (France) Amiens)
—	FW	ROU	Andrei Ciolacu (from (Singapore) Warriors FC)
—	FW	ROU	Róbert Elek (from Botoșani)

Out:

No.	Pos.	Nation	Player
—	GK	ROU	Horia Ciobanu (to Sporting Roșiori, previously on loan at Balotești)
—	GK	ROU	Ștefan Teodorescu (on loan to Voința Turnu Măgurele)
—	FW	ROU	Simon Măzărache (loan return to Universitatea Craiova)
—	GK	ROU	Eugen Brie (to Free agent)
—	DF	ROU	Alexandru Benga (to (Poland) Sandecja Nowy Sącz)
—	DF	ROU	Iulian Carabela (on loan to Poli Timișoara)
—	DF	ROU	Ovidiu Morariu (to Chindia Târgoviște)
—	DF	ROU	Ioan Neag (to Șirineasa)
—	DF	ROU	Vlad Opriș (to Foresta Suceava, previously on loan at Balotești)
—	MF	ROU	Valentin Bărbulescu (to CSMȘ Reșița)
—	MF	ROU	Florin Cazan (to Unirea Slobozia)
—	MF	ROU	George Călințaru (to Farul Constanța)
—	MF	GEO	Nika Dzalamidze (to (Georgia (country)) Dinamo Tbilisi)
—	MF	ROU	Andrei Lungu (to (Israel) Hapoel Nir Ramat HaSharon)
—	MF	ROU	Mădălin Mihăescu (to CSM Politehnica Iași)
—	MF	BIH	Ivan Sesar (to (Finland) Inter Turku)
—	MF	ROU	Marian Stoenac (to Șirineasa)
—	MF	ROU	Alexandru Zaharia (to CSM Politehnica Iași)
—	FW	ROU	Adrian Hurdubei (on loan to Aerostar Bacău, previously on loan at Balotești)
—	FW	ROU	Cătălin Țîră (to Șirineasa)

== Statistics ==
=== Goalscorers ===
Last updated on 2 June 2018 (UTC)

Player	Liga I	Cupa României	Total
(Romania) Simon Măzărache	3	0	3
(Georgia (country)) Nika Dzalamidze	2	0	2
(Romania) Cătălin Țîră	2	0	2
(Romania) George Călințaru	2	0	2
(Brazil) Wallace	2	0	2
(Romania) Florin Ștefan	2	0	2
(Romania) Liviu Băjenaru	1	1	2
(Romania) Marian Stoenac	1	0	1
(Romania) Róbert Elek	1	0	1
(Romania) Ciprian Petre	1	0	1
(Romania) Vasile Gheorghe	1	0	1
(Romania) Mihai Leca	1	0	1
(Romania) Mihai Ilie	1	0	1
(Romania) Alexandru Zaharia	0	1	1
Own goals
(Portugal) Artur Jorge	1	0	1

== Pre-season and friendlies ==
23 June 2017 Friendly	Chindia Târgoviște (Romania)	0–2	(Romania) Juventus București	Târgoviște, Romania
			Băjenaru (??); Buștea (??)	Stadium: Stadionul Eugen Popescu

27 June 2017 Friendly	Juventus București (Romania)	3–0	(Romania) Metaloglobus București	Bucharest, Romania
18:00	Unknown (??); Unknown (??); Unknown (??)			Stadium: Juventus

1 July 2017 Friendly	Juventus București (Romania)	2–1	(Iran) Sanat Naft	Turkey
	Mihăescu (??); Buhăescu (??)		Unknown (??)

3 July 2017 Friendly	Juventus București (Romania)	0–0	(Iran) Sanat Naft	Turkey

5 July 2017 Friendly	Juventus București (Romania)	0–1	(United Arab Emirates) Al-Nasr	Turkey
		Match suspended in min. 70 due to weather.	Unknown (??)

8 July 2017 Friendly	Fenerbahçe (Turkey)	2–3	(Romania) Juventus București	Turkey
18:00	Ekici 56', 67'		Muscă 5'; Băjenaru 17'; C. Petre 44'

8 October 2017 Friendly	Juventus București (Romania)	2–2	(Romania) Astra Giurgiu	Bucharest, Romania
	Băjenaru 16'; Stoenac (??)		Nyuiadzi 45'; Abang 65'; Le Tallec (penalty missed) ??'; Chipirliu (penalty missed) ??'	Stadium: Juventus

14 January 2018 Friendly	Juventus București (Romania)	2–0	(Kazakhstan) Akzhayik	Turkey
23:30	Sălcianu (??); Ciobanu (??)

17 January 2018 Friendly	Juventus București (Romania)	1–1	(Albania) Kamza	Turkey
14:30	Elek (??)		Mehmeti 5'

20 January 2018 Friendly	Juventus București (Romania)	0–0	(Ukraine) Stal Kamianske	Lara, Turkey
16:30				Stadium: Topkapi Football Center; Attendance: 30

26 January 2018 Friendly	Juventus București (Romania)	3–1	(Romania) Metaloglobus București	Bucharest, Romania
12:00	Elek (??); Rabeï (??)		Voican (??)	Stadium: Juventus

23 March 2018 Friendly	Viitorul Constanța (Romania)	Canceled	(Romania) Juventus București	Ovidiu, Romania
14:00				Stadium: Viitorul

== Competitions ==
=== Liga I ===
==== Regular season ====
Overall								Home						Away					
Pld	W	D	L	GF	GA	GD	Pts	W	D	L	GF	GA	GD	W	D	L	GF	GA	GD
26	1	8	17	12	47	−35	11	1	4	8	7	22	−15	0	4	9	5	25	−20

Last updated: 25 February 2018 (UTC).

===== Table =====
Pos	Team	Pld	W	D	L	GF	GA	GD	Pts	Qualification
10	Voluntari	26	7	7	12	25	35	−10	28 (Note: Concordia is ahead of Voluntari on head-to-head results: Voluntari–Concordia 0–1, Concordia–Voluntari 3–1.)	Qualification for the Relegation round
11	ACS Poli Timișoara	26	6	9	11	22	37	−15	27	Qualification for the Relegation round
12	Sepsi OSK	26	5	4	17	15	44	−29	19	Qualification for the Relegation round
13	Gaz Metan Mediaș	26	2	10	14	14	39	−25	16	Qualification for the Relegation round
14	Juventus București	26	1	8	17	12	47	−35	11	Qualification for the Relegation round

Source: LPF (in Romanian), Soccerway
Rules for classification: 1) Points; 2) Head-to-head points; 3) Head-to-head goal difference; 4) Head-to-head goals scored; 5) Goal difference; 6) Goals scored; 7) Play-off.

===== Position by round =====
Round	1	2	3	4	5	6	7	8	9	10	11	12	13	14	15	16	17	18	19	20	21	22	23	24	25	26
Ground	H	A	H	A	H	A	H	A	H	H	A	H	H	A	H	A	H	A	H	A	H	A	A	H	A	H
Result	L	L	D	L	L	D	L	L	D	L	L	D	L	L	W	D	D	L	L	L	L	L	D	L	D	L
Position	14	14	13	13	14	14	14	14	14	14	14	14	14	14	14	14	14	14	14	14	14	14	14	14	14	14

Updated to match(es) played on 25 February (UTC). Source: Matches
A = Away; H = Home; W = Win; D = Draw; L = Loss

===== Results =====
15 July 2017 Round 1	Juventus București	0–3	Dinamo București	Ploiești
21:00 EET (UTC+02)	Mihăescu (yellow card) 44' (yellow-red card) 53'		Rivaldinho 32'; Hanca (yellow card) 43'; Mahlangu (yellow card) 45+2'; Nascimento 66'; Nemec (yellow card) 76'; Nedelcearu 90+2'	Stadium: Ilie Oană; Attendance: 7,000; Referee: Horațiu Feșnic; Assistant referees: Alexandru Cerei, Mihai Marius Marica; Fourth official: Lucian Rușandu

21 July 2017 Round 2	Sepsi Sfântu Gheorghe	2–1	Juventus București	Brașov
18:30 EET (UTC+02)	Thiaw (yellow card) 24'; Ghinga 62'; Hadnagy (yellow card) 66'; Herea 90+1'; Niczuly (yellow card) 90+5'		Petre (yellow card) 4'; Wallace (yellow card) 40'; Stoenac (yellow card) 52', (goal) 90+3'; Măzărache (yellow card) 57'	Stadium: Tineretului; Attendance: 3,000; Referee: Adrian Comănescu; Assistant referees: Vasile Marinescu, Dragoș Iliescu; Fourth official: Ionuț Coza

29 July 2017 Round 3	Juventus București	0–0	Voluntari	Ploiești
18:30 EET (UTC+02)	Beța (yellow card) 32'; Țîră (yellow card) 68'; Mihăescu (yellow card) 89'			Stadium: Ilie Oană; Attendance: 200; Referee: Adrian Cojocaru; Assistant referees: Ciprian Danșa, Marius Cristian Marchidanu; Fourth official: Lucian Rușandu

4 August 2017 Round 4	Poli Timișoara	2–1	Juventus București	Timișoara
18:30 EET (UTC+02)	Munteanu 9'; Mailat 68'		Sesar (yellow card) 42'; Mihăescu (yellow card) 46'; Țîră 90'	Stadium: Dan Păltinișanu; Attendance: 200; Referee: Andrei Antonie; Assistant referees: Daniel Mitruți, Mihai Marius Marica; Fourth official: George Găman

9 August 2017 Round 5	Juventus București	0–1	CS Universitatea Craiova	Ploiești
19:15 EET (UTC+02)	Călințaru (yellow card) 45+2'; Stoenac (yellow card) 65'; Băjenaru (yellow card) 88'		Mateiu (yellow card) 40'; Spahija (yellow card) 40'; Gustavo 45', (penalty missed) 54'	Stadium: Ilie Oană; Attendance: 150; Referee: Cătălin Popa; Assistant referees: Mircea Grigoriu, Gabriel Stroe; Fourth official: Florin Andrei

12 August 2017 Round 6	Concordia Chiajna	1–1	Juventus București	Chiajna
18:30 EET (UTC+02)	Feussi (yellow card) 4'; Cristescu 44'; Babić (yellow card) 79'; Bucurică (yellow card) 89'		Măzărache 45+1'; Wallace (yellow card) 82'	Stadium: Concordia; Attendance: 300; Referee: Marcel Bîrsan; Assistant referees: Marius Nicoară, Iulius Timar; Fourth official: Iulian Călin

19 August 2017 Round 7	Juventus București	1–2	Steaua București	Ploiești
21:00 EET (UTC+02)	Jorge 1' (o.g.); Carabela (yellow card) 45' (yellow-red card) 72'; Sesar (yellow card) 45+1'; Călințaru (penalty missed) 90+6'		R. Benzar 22'; Man (yellow card) 17', (goal) 34'; Filip (yellow card) 62'; Gnohéré (yellow card) 75'; Pintilii (yellow card) 85'	Stadium: Ilie Oană; Attendance: 3,000; Referee: Marius Avram; Assistant referees: Mircea Orbuleț, Florin Păunescu; Fourth official: Robert Dumitru

25 August 2017 Round 8	Astra Giurgiu	2–0	Juventus București	Giurgiu
18:30 EET (UTC+02)	Polczak (yellow card) 28'; Belu 44'; Mrzljak (yellow card) 48'; Nicoară (yellow card) 85'; Le Tallec 87'		Petre (yellow card) 40'; Măzărache (yellow card) 48'; Bărbulescu (yellow card) 67'; Benga (yellow card) 72'; Sesar (red card) 78'	Stadium: Marin Anastasovici; Attendance: 300; Referee: Ovidiu Hațegan; Assistant referees: Octavian Șovre, Sebastian Gheorghe; Fourth official: Cătălin Popa

9 September 2017 Round 9	Juventus București	2–2	CSM Politehnica Iași	Ploiești
18:00 EET (UTC+02)	Dzalamidze 3'; Măzărache 33'; Wallace (yellow card) 36'; Băjenaru (yellow card) 89'; Mihăescu (yellow card) 90+1'		Platini 18'; Cristea 27'; Frăsinescu (yellow card) 67'	Stadium: Ilie Oană; Attendance: 200; Referee: George Rădulescu; Assistant referees: Mihai Marius Marica, Iulian Radu; Fourth official: Andrei Chivulete

15 September 2017 Round 10	Juventus București	0–2	Botoșani	Ploiești
18:00 EET (UTC+02)	Mihăescu (yellow card) 83'; Măzărache (yellow card) 85'		Buș 30'; Roman 76'; Serediuc (yellow card) 90+4'	Stadium: Ilie Oană; Attendance: 44; Referee: Alexandru Tudor; Assistant referees: George Neacșu, Romică Bîrdeș; Fourth official: Dan Botescu

21 September 2017 Round 11	Viitorul Constanța	3–0	Juventus București	Ovidiu
16:30 EET (UTC+02)	Ganea 12'; Țucudean (yellow card) 33'; Mladen (yellow card) 47'; Horj (yellow card) 61'; Eric 73'; Mățan 78'		Bărbulescu (yellow card) 14'	Stadium: Viitorul; Attendance: 1,500; Referee: Iulian Călin; Assistant referees: Mircea Grigoriu, Adrian Vornicu; Fourth official: Lucian Ruşandu

25 September 2017 Round 12	Juventus București	1–1	Gaz Metan Mediaș	Ploiești
15:00 EET (UTC+02)	Călințaru 37'; Beța (yellow card) 67'; Bărbulescu (yellow card) 70'		Sîrghi (yellow card) 16'; Danci (yellow card) 47'; Romeo 50'	Stadium: Ilie Oană; Attendance: 150; Referee: Sebastian Colțescu; Assistant referees: Radu Ghinguleac, Ovidiu Artene; Fourth official: Sorin Antonie

1 October 2017 Round 13	CFR Cluj	2–0	Juventus București	Cluj-Napoca
18:00 EET (UTC+02)	Păun 29'; Đoković (yellow card) 53'; Culio 83' (pen.); Urko Vera (yellow card) 90+1'		Benga (yellow card) 71'	Stadium: Dr. Constantin Rădulescu; Attendance: 6,218; Referee: Sorin Antonie; Assistant referees: Daniel Mitruți, Ferencz Tunyogi; Fourth official: Marian Barbu

16 October 2017 Round 14	Dinamo București	3–0	Juventus București	Bucharest
20:45 EET (UTC+02)	Katsikas 44', 50'; Costache 80'		Băjenaru (penalty missed) 40'	Stadium: Dinamo; Attendance: 1,616; Referee: Andrei Chivulete; Assistant referees: Adrian Popescu, Raul Ghiciulescu; Fourth official: Adrian Comănescu

21 October 2017 Round 15	Juventus București	2–1	Sepsi Sfântu Gheorghe	Ploiești
18:00 EET (UTC+02)	Wallace 27'; Bărbulescu (yellow card) 33'; Mihăescu (yellow card) 37'; Măzărache 60'; Benga (yellow card) 60'; Petre (yellow card) 70'; Drăghia (yellow card) 88'		Astafei 16'; Nikolić (yellow card) 83'	Stadium: Ilie Oană; Attendance: 150; Referee: Ionuţ Coza; Assistant referees: Bogdan Gheorge, Bogdan Veliciu; Fourth official: Adrian Comănescu

28 October 2017 Round 16	Voluntari	0–0	Juventus București	Voluntari
18:00 EET (UTC+02)	Marinescu (yellow card) 78'; Căpățînă (yellow card) 88'		Carabela (yellow card) 88'; Drăghia (yellow card) 89'; Mihăescu (yellow card) 90+2'	Stadium: Anghel Iordănescu; Attendance: 414; Referee: Marcel Bîrsan; Assistant referees: Sebastian Stoianov, Iulian Radu; Fourth official: Adrian Comănescu

6 November 2017 Round 17	Juventus București	1–1	Poli Timișoara	Ploiești
20:45 EET (UTC+02)	Sesar (yellow card) 50'; Benga (yellow card) 64'; Băjenaru (yellow card) 66'; Dzalamidze 82'		Abraw 11'; Cânu (yellow card) 36'; Artean (yellow card) 37'; Vașvari (yellow card) 39'; Croitoru (yellow card) 83'; Miguel (yellow card) 90+2'	Stadium: Ilie Oană; Attendance: 27; Referee: Lucian Ruşandu; Assistant referees: Marius Nicoară, Adrian Mărginean; Fourth official: Iulian Călin

18 November 2017 Round 18	CS Universitatea Craiova	3–1	Juventus București	Craiova
19:00 EET (UTC+02)	Mitriță 39', 45+2'; Martić (yellow card) 50'; Gustavo 63'; Bancu (yellow card) 89'		Țîră 80'; Morariu (yellow card) 82'; Bărbulescu (yellow card) 86'	Stadium: Ion Oblemenco; Attendance: 17,854; Referee: Iulian Călin; Assistant referees: Bogdan Gheorghe, Stelian Slabu; Fourth official: Cătălin Popa

24 November 2017 Round 19	Juventus București	0–5	Concordia Chiajna	Ploiești
18:00 EET (UTC+02)			Cristescu 4', 90+3'; Deaconu 38'; Bumba 86'; Bud 90+1', (penalty missed) 90+1'	Stadium: Ilie Oană; Attendance: 50; Referee: Iulian Dima; Assistant referees: Daniel Mitruți, Ferencz Tunyogi; Fourth official: Dan Botescu

3 December 2017 Round 20	Steaua București	4–0	Juventus București	Bucharest
20:45 EET (UTC+02)	Tănase 54', (yellow card) 71', (goal) 78'; Gnohéré 80'; Budescu 90+1'			Stadium: Arena Națională; Attendance: 1,500; Referee: Horia Mladinovici; Assistant referees: Vasile Marinescu, Daniel Hulubei; Fourth official: Alexandru Tudor

8 December 2017 Round 21	Juventus București	0–1	Astra Giurgiu	Ploiești
21:00 EET (UTC+02)	Wallace (yellow card) 25'; Băjenaru (yellow card) 49' (red card) 49'; Mihăescu (yellow card) 62'; Țîră (yellow card) 79'; Bărbulescu (yellow card) 90'		Abang (yellow card) 24'; Ioniță (penalty missed) 39', 51' (pen.); Stan (yellow card) 77'	Stadium: Ilie Oană; Attendance: 50; Referee: Andrei Chivulete; Assistant referees: Iulian Radu, Ionel Dumitru; Fourth official: Marcel Bîrsan

17 December 2017 Round 22	CSM Politehnica Iași	3–1	Juventus București	Iași
17:00 EET (UTC+02)	Platini 11'; Sin 29'; Frăsinescu (yellow card) 36'; Cissé 50'; Bădic (yellow card) 81'		Călințaru 26'	Stadium: Emil Alexandrescu; Attendance: 700; Referee: Robert Dumitru; Assistant referees: Sebastian Stoianov, Stelian Slabu; Fourth official: Ionuț Coza

4 February 2018 Round 23	Botoșani	0–0	Juventus București	Botoșani
18:00 EET (UTC+02)	Axente (yellow card) 89'		Leca (yellow card) 61'; Drăghia (yellow card) 90+1'	Stadium: Municipal; Attendance: 2,500; Referee: Ionuț Coza; Assistant referees: Vasile Marinescu, Bogdan Gheorghe; Fourth official: Horia Mladinovici

10 February 2018 Round 24	Juventus București	0–1	Viitorul Constanța	Ploiești
18:00 EET (UTC+02)	Balgiu (yellow card) 60'; Drăghici (yellow card) 73'; Nicoară (yellow card) 80'		Dumitrescu (yellow card) 66'; I. Hagi 79' (pen.); Cojocaru (yellow card) 90+2'	Stadium: Ilie Oană; Attendance: 200; Referee: George Găman; Assistant referees: Radu Ghinguleac, Imre-Laszlo Bucsi; Fourth official: Cătălin Popa

16 February 2018 Round 25	Gaz Metan Mediaș	0–0	Juventus București	Mediaș
18:00 EET (UTC+02)	Rosado (yellow card) 4'; Diogo (yellow card) 68'		Acolatse (yellow card) 11'; V. Gheorghe (yellow card) 82'; D. Popescu (yellow card) 90+3'	Stadium: Municipal Gaz Metan; Attendance: 800; Referee: Iulian Călin; Assistant referees: Daniel Mitruți, Gabriel Stroe; Fourth official: Ionuț Coza

25 February 2018 Round 26	Juventus București	0–2	CFR Cluj	Ploiești
18:00 EET (UTC+02)			Omrani 64'; Ioniță (penalty missed) 67', 68'	Stadium: Ilie Oană; Attendance: 40; Referee: Adrian Comănescu; Assistant referees: Bogdan Gheorghe, Marius Nicoară; Fourth official: Cătălin Busi

==== Relegation round ====
Overall								Home						Away					
Pld	W	D	L	GF	GA	GD	Pts	W	D	L	GF	GA	GD	W	D	L	GF	GA	GD
14	3	2	9	9	25	−16	11	1	1	5	4	15	−11	2	1	4	5	10	−5

Last updated: 2 June 2018.

===== Table =====
Pos	Team	Pld	W	D	L	GF	GA	GD	Pts	Qualification or relegation
7	Dinamo București	14	11	1	2	29	10	+19	54	
8	Botoșani	14	5	5	4	12	9	+3	40	
9	Sepsi OSK	14	6	6	2	21	14	+7	34	
10	Gaz Metan Mediaș	14	6	4	4	18	15	+3	30	
11	Concordia Chiajna	14	4	4	6	13	17	−4	30	
12	Voluntari (O)	14	3	4	7	16	22	−6	27	Qualification for the relegation play-offs
13	ACS Poli Timișoara (R)	14	3	4	7	10	16	−6	27	Relegation to Liga II
14	Juventus București (R)	14	3	2	9	9	25	−16	17	Relegation to Liga II

Source: Soccerway
Rules for classification: 1) Points; 2) Points without rounding; 3) Head-to-head points; 4) Head-to-head goal difference; 5) Head-to-head goals scored; 6) Goal difference; 7) Goals scored; 8) Play-off (only if needed to decide teams for relegation). (Note: only criteria 6 and 7 are applied to establish the classification during the competition.)
(O) Play-off winners; (R) Relegated

===== Position by round =====
Round	1	2	3	4	5	6	7	8	9	10	11	12	13	14
Ground	A	H	A	H	A	H	A	H	A	H	A	H	A	H
Result	D	W	W	L	L	L	W	L	L	L	L	L	L	D
Position	14	14	13	14	14	14	14	14	14	14	14	14	14	14

Updated to match(es) played on 2 June 2018. Source: Matches
A = Away; H = Home; W = Win; D = Draw; L = Loss

===== Results =====
9 March 2018 Round 1	Botoșani	0–0	Juventus București	Botoșani
18:00 EET (UTC+02)	Plămadă (yellow card) 60'		Constantinescu (yellow card) 7'; D. Popescu (yellow card) 47'; Drăghici (yellow card) 65'; Acolatse (yellow card) 72'	Stadium: Municipal; Attendance: 2,000; Referee: Radu Petrescu; Assistant referees: Daniel Mitruți, Alexandru Vodă; Fourth official: Marcel Bîrsan

16 March 2018 Round 2	Juventus București	1–0	Poli Timișoara	Voluntari
18:00 EET (UTC+02)	Elek 14'; Kardeş (yellow card) 26'; Wallace (yellow card) 45'; Rabeï (yellow card) 90+2'		Artean (yellow card) 23'; Vașvari (yellow card) 67'; Munteanu (yellow card) 88'	Stadium: Anghel Iordănescu; Attendance: 200; Referee: Sebastian Colțescu; Assistant referees: Andrei Constantinescu, Adrian Popescu; Fourth official: Marian Balaci

30 March 2018 Round 3	Dinamo București	1–2	Juventus București	Bucharest
20:45 EET (UTC+02)	Olteanu (yellow card) 33'; D. Popa 52'; Romera (yellow card) 52'; M. Popescu (yellow card) 73'		Petre 10'; Elek (yellow card) 68'; Wallace 71'; Nicoară (yellow card) 78'; Drăghici (yellow card) 83'; Drăghia (yellow card) 85'	Stadium: Dinamo; Attendance: 1,100; Referee: Marian Balaci; Assistant referees: George Neacșu, Stelian Slabu; Fourth official: Robert Dumitru

9 April 2018 Round 4	Juventus București	0–2	Sepsi Sfântu Gheorghe	Voluntari
18:00 EET (UTC+02)	D. Popescu (yellow card) 21'; Drăghici (yellow card) 84'		I. Fülöp (yellow card) 40'; Sato (yellow card) 46'; Simonovski 53'; Viera (yellow card) 59'; Tandia 90+3' (pen.)	Stadium: Anghel Iordănescu; Attendance: 500; Referee: Ovidiu Hațegan; Assistant referees: Octavian Șovre, Sebastian Gheorghe; Fourth official: Iulian Dima

15 April 2018 Round 5	Concordia Chiajna	2–1	Juventus București	Chiajna
13:00 EET (UTC+02)	Bawab (yellow card) 39'; Cristescu (yellow card) 52'; Prepeliță 69'; Patache (yellow card) 72'; Pena 76'		Fl. Ștefan 27'; Leca (yellow card) 73'; Wallace (yellow card) 84'	Stadium: Concordia; Attendance: 1,000; Referee: Cătălin Popa; Assistant referees: Vasile Marinescu, Gabriel Stroe; Fourth official: Iulian Călin

22 April 2018 Round 6	Juventus București	0–3	Gaz Metan Mediaș	Voluntari
18:00 EET (UTC+02)	D. Popescu (yellow card) 29'; Drăghici (yellow card) 38'; Drăghia (yellow card) 56'		Olaru (yellow card) 17'; Ely 27', 64', 70'; Rondón (penalty missed) 57'	Stadium: Anghel Iordănescu; Attendance: 50; Referee: Andrei Chivulete; Assistant referees: Bogdan Gheorghe, Imre-Laszlo Bucsi; Fourth official: Adrian Cojocaru

27 April 2018 Round 7	Voluntari	0–1	Juventus București	Voluntari
20:45 EET (UTC+02)	Novac (yellow card) 39'; Pîrcălabu (yellow card) 86'		Wallace (yellow card) 33'; V. Gheorghe 58' (pen.), (yellow card) 87'; Constantinescu (yellow card) 74'; Drăghia (yellow card) 88'; Ene (yellow card) 90+6'	Stadium: Anghel Iordănescu; Attendance: 500; Referee: Răzvan Beldiman; Assistant referees: Florin Iftode, Daniel Bararu; Fourth official: Dragoş Istrate

5 May 2018 Round 8	Juventus București	0–3	Botoșani	Voluntari
15:30 EET (UTC+02)	Băjenaru (yellow card) 57'		Golofca 5'; Roman 20'; Axente 31'; Achim (yellow card) 37'; Rodríguez (yellow card) 67'; Miron (yellow card) 86'	Stadium: Anghel Iordănescu; Attendance: 50; Referee: Lucian Ruşandu; Assistant referees: Alexandru Cerei, Dragoș Iliescu; Fourth official: Ionuț Coza

11 May 2018 Round 9	Poli Timișoara	2–0	Juventus București	Timișoara
17:00 EET (UTC+02)	Wallace 6' (o.g.); Bîrnoi (yellow card) 17'; Vașvari 49' (pen.); Roman (yellow card) 63'			Stadium: Dan Păltinișanu; Attendance: 300; Referee: Cătălin Popa; Assistant referees: Sebastian Stoianov, Gabriel Stroe; Fourth official: Robert Dumitru

15 May 2018 Round 10	Juventus București	0–2	Dinamo București	Voluntari
21:00 EET (UTC+02)	Constantinescu (yellow card) 71'		Corbu (yellow card) 32'; M. Popescu 64'; Nistor 72'	Stadium: Anghel Iordănescu; Attendance: 400; Referee: Adrian Cojocaru; Assistant referees: Andrei Constantinescu, Ionel Dumitru; Fourth official: Cătălin Busi

18 May 2018 Round 11	Sepsi Sfântu Gheorghe	2–1	Juventus București	Sfântu Gheorghe
18:00 EET (UTC+02)	I. Fülöp 6'; Ursu 52'; Viera (yellow card) 84'; Niczuly (yellow card) 90+3'		Leca 16', (yellow card) 45'; Ene (yellow card) 63'	Stadium: Municipal; Attendance: 3,000; Referee: Iulian Călin; Assistant referees: Ovidiu Artene, Marius Marchidanu; Fourth official: Sorin Antonie

22 May 2018 Round 12	Juventus București	1–3	Concordia Chiajna	Voluntari
20:45 EET (UTC+02)	Băjenaru 27'; Balgiu (yellow card) 40'; Simion (yellow card) 56'		Batin 13' (pen.); Albu (yellow card) 26'; Nivaldo 29'; Bucșa (yellow card) 73'; Cristescu 77'	Stadium: Anghel Iordănescu; Attendance: 50; Referee: Radu Petrescu; Assistant referees: Marius Nicoară, Alexandru Vodă; Fourth official: Ionuț Coza

28 May 2018 Round 13	Gaz Metan Mediaș	3–0	Juventus București	Mediaș
18:00 EET (UTC+02)	Constantin 33'; Rondón 65', 84'		Nicoară (yellow card) 73'	Stadium: Municipal Gaz Metan; Attendance: 2,500; Referee: George Găman; Assistant referees: Daniel Mitruți, Bogdan Gheorghe; Fourth official: Adrian Cojocaru

2 June 2018 Round 14	Juventus București	2–2	Voluntari	Voluntari
21:30 EET (UTC+02)	Fl. Ștefan 39'; Ilie 85'		Leasă (yellow card) 27'; Bălan 57'; Ivanovici (yellow card) 73'; Cernat 88' (pen.)	Stadium: Anghel Iordănescu; Attendance: 250; Referee: Sebastian Colțescu; Assistant referees: Sebastian Gheorghe, Dragoș Iliescu; Fourth official: George Rădulescu

=== Cupa României ===
==== Results ====
25 October 2017 Round of 32	Dacia Unirea Brăila	1–2	Juventus București	Brăila
14:30 EET (UTC+02)	Niță (yellow card) 75'; Banyoi 84'; Covaciu (yellow card) 85'; Bucur (yellow card) 90+1'; Ciucureanu (yellow card) 90+2'		Băjenaru 17'; Bărbulescu (yellow card) 69'; Zaharia 74'; Stoian (yellow card) 90+3'	Stadium: Municipal; Attendance: 500; Referee: Mihai Amoraritei; Assistant referees: Ovidiu Amoraritei, Adrian Vornicu; Fourth official: Florin Dan

30 November 2017 Round of 16	Hermannstadt	2–0	Juventus București	Sibiu
14:00 EET (UTC+02)	Lupu (yellow card) 15'; Stancu (yellow card) 34'; Morariu 59' (o.g.); Tătar 67'		Mihăescu (yellow card) 22'; Fl. Ștefan (yellow card) 49'; Măzărache (yellow card) 75'	Stadium: Municipal; Attendance: 4,000; Referee: Cătălin Popa; Assistant referees: George Neacșu, Gabriel Stroe; Fourth official: Denis Haidiner

== See also ==
- 2017–18 Cupa României
- 2017–18 Liga I
