= List of Romanian football transfers summer 2018 =

This is a list of Romanian football transfers for the 2018–19 summer transfer window. Due to size concerns, only moves featuring 2018–19 Liga I are listed.

== Liga I ==
=== Astra Giurgiu ===
In:

No.	Pos.	Nation	Player
—	DF	ROU	Radu Crișan (loan return from Hermannstadt)
—	MF	ROU	Robert Boboc (loan return from Hermannstadt)
—	GK	POR	Miguel Santos (from (Netherlands) Fortuna Sittard)
—	DF	COD	Mike Cestor (from (France) Épinal)
—	DF	ROU	Andrei Trușescu (from Dănuț Coman Football Academy, previously on loan at (Italy) Roma)
—	MF	CGO	Dylan Bahamboula (from (France) Dijon, previously on loan at (France) Gazélec Ajaccio)
—	MF	ROU	Alexandru Duminică (from Viitorul Argeș)
—	MF	BEN	Djiman Koukou (from (France) Lens)
—	MF	ROU	George Marin (from Universitatea Cluj)
—	MF	ROU	Neluț Roșu (from (Bulgaria) Levski Sofia)
—	MF	MDA	Victor Stînă (from (Moldova) Zimbru Chișinău)
—	FW	ROU	Denis Alibec (from FCSB)
—	FW	FRA	Julien Bègue (from (France) Bourg-en-Bresse)
—	FW	ALB	Azdren Llullaku (from (Italy) Virtus Entella)
—	FW	CMR	Justin Mengolo (from (Hungary) Debrecen)
—	FW	CMR	Jacques Zoua (from (Belgium) Beerschot Wilrijk)

Out:

No.	Pos.	Nation	Player
—	MF	ROU	Vlad Bărbulescu (loan return to Viitorul Domnești, later signed by Academica Clinceni)
—	MF	ROU	Florentin Matei (loan return to (Croatia) Rijeka, later signed by (United Arab Emirates) Al-Ittihad Kalba)
—	FW	CMR	Anatole Abang (loan return to (United States) New York Red Bulls)
—	FW	ESP	Urko Vera (loan return to CFR Cluj)
—	GK	ROU	Ionuț Boșneag (Retired)
—	DF	ROU	Alin Bărîcă (to Ripensia Timișoara, previously on loan at Luceafărul Oradea)
—	DF	ROU	Alexandru Dandea (to Hermannstadt)
—	DF	ROU	Andrei Pițian (to Botoșani, previously on loan at (Cyprus) Apollon Limassol)
—	DF	POL	Piotr Polczak (to (Poland) Zagłębie Sosnowiec)
—	DF	ROU	Mircea Popescu (on loan to Metalul Buzău)
—	DF	ROU	Mădălin Răileanu (on loan to Metalul Buzău, previously on loan at Metaloglobus București)
—	DF	ROU	Alexandru Stan (to FCSB)
—	MF	ROU	Sebastian Culda (on loan to Metaloglobus București)
—	MF	ROU	Ionuț Ilie (to Flacăra Moreni)
—	MF	ROU	Viorel Nicoară (to Energeticianul, previously on loan at Daco-Getica București)
—	MF	ROU	Marius Pahonțu (to Turris-Oltul Turnu Măgurele)
—	MF	JPN	Takayuki Seto (to (Japan) Ventforet Kofu)
—	FW	ROU	Marc Khalil (to Dunărea Călărași)

=== Botoșani ===
In:

No.	Pos.	Nation	Player
—	DF	ROU	Andrei Chindriș (loan return from Știința Miroslava)
—	MF	ROU	Alexandru Corban (loan return from Știința Miroslava)
—	MF	ROU	Marian Târșă (loan return from Academica Clinceni)
—	GK	AUT	Martin Fraisl (from (Austria) Floridsdorfer AC)
—	DF	ROU	Andrei Patache (from Concordia Chiajna)
—	DF	ROU	Andrei Pițian (from Astra Giurgiu, previously on loan at (Cyprus) Apollon Limassol)
—	DF	GRE	Aristidis Soiledis (from (Greece) Kerkyra)
—	MF	ITA	Diego Fabbrini (from (England) Birmingham City, previously on loan at (Spain) Real Oviedo)
—	MF	ROU	Eduard Florescu (from Viitorul Constanța)
—	MF	ROU	Cătălin Golofca (from FCSB, previously on loan)
—	MF	ALB	Enriko Papa (from (Albania) Lushnja)
—	FW	ROU	Răzvan Andronic (from Ardealul)
—	FW	CRO	Marko Brekalo (from (Croatia) Šibenik)
—	FW	CIV	Lossémy Karaboué (from (France) Valenciennes)
—	FW	FRA	Hervin Ongenda (from (Spain) Real Murcia)
—	FW	ROU	Mihai Roman II (on loan from CS U Craiova, previously on loan at Poli Timișoara)
—	FW	SRB	Nikola Trujić (from (Russia) Tosno)

Out:

No.	Pos.	Nation	Player
—	MF	ROU	Vlad Achim (loan return to FCSB, later signed by Viitorul Constanța)
—	GK	ROU	Alberto Cobrea (to Politehnica Iași)
—	GK	ROU	Adrian Duță (on loan to Știința Miroslava)
—	DF	ROU	Florin Acsinte (to Free agent)
—	DF	ROU	Claudiu Juncănaru (to Turris-Oltul Turnu Măgurele, previously on loan)
—	DF	ROU	Nicolae Mușat (to Daco-Getica București)
—	DF	ROU	Florin Plămadă (to Petrolul Ploiești)
—	DF	ROU	Răzvan Tincu (to (Cyprus) Doxa Katokopias)
—	DF	ROU	Bogdan Ungurușan (Retired)
—	MF	ROU	Vasile Chirilescu (to Aerostar Bacău, previously on loan at Roman)
—	MF	ROU	Stelian Cucu (to Dunărea Călărași)
—	MF	ROU	Olimpiu Moruțan (to FCSB)
—	MF	ROU	Mihai Roman (to FCSB)
—	MF	ROU	Tiberiu Serediuc (to Hermannstadt)
—	FW	ROU	Mircea Axente (to Dinamo București)
—	FW	BIH	Bojan Golubović (to (Bosnia and Herzegovina) Krupa)
—	FW	KSA	Naif Hazazi (to (Saudi Arabia) Ohod)

=== CFR Cluj ===
In:

No.	Pos.	Nation	Player
—	MF	POR	Thierry Moutinho (loan return from (Spain) Cultural Leonesa)
—	FW	ESP	Urko Vera (loan return from Astra Giurgiu)
—	GK	ESP	Jesús Fernández (from (Spain) Cultural Leonesa)
—	DF	HUN	Ádám Lang (from (France) Dijon, previously on loan at (France) Nancy)
—	DF	ROU	Andrei Radu (from (Cyprus) Aris Limassol)
—	MF	CRO	Mate Maleš (from (Croatia) Rijeka)
—	FW	BRA	Júlio Baptista (from Free agent)
—	FW	ROU	George Ganea (from (Italy) Roma)
—	FW	ITA	Giuseppe De Luca (on loan from (Italy) Atalanta, previously on loan at (Italy) Virtus Entella)
—	FW	CMR	Robert Tambe (from (Turkey) Adana Demirspor)

Out:

No.	Pos.	Nation	Player
—	GK	CRO	Tomislav Duka (to (Croatia) Hajduk Split)
—	GK	ROU	Horațiu Moldovan (on loan to Energeticianul, previously on loan at Turris-Oltul Turnu Măgurele)
—	GK	ROU	Cosmin Vâtcă (to Voluntari)
—	DF	CIV	Kevin Boli (to (China) Guizhou Hengfeng)
—	DF	BRA	Gilvan (to (Brazil) Atlético Goianiense)
—	DF	ROU	Srdjan Luchin (to Viitorul Constanța)
—	DF	ROU	Laurențiu Rus (to Politehnica Iași)
—	DF	ROU	Alexandru Vlad (to Voluntari)
—	MF	FRA	Bryan Nouvier (on loan to Sepsi Sfântu Gheorghe)
—	MF	ROU	Rareș Pintea (to Național Sebiș, previously on loan)
—	MF	ROU	Szilárd Vereș (to Miercurea Ciuc, previously on loan at Național Sebiș)
—	FW	SEN	Ibrahima Baldé (to (Spain) Real Oviedo)
—	FW	ROU	Marius Coman (to Universitatea Cluj)
—	FW	ROU	Gabriel Dodoi (on loan to Sepsi Sfântu Gheorghe)
—	FW	CRO	Dino Špehar (to (Albania) Kukësi, previously on loan at Dunărea Călărași)

=== Concordia Chiajna ===
In:

No.	Pos.	Nation	Player
—	MF	ROU	Cristian Ciobanu (loan return from Daco-Getica București)
—	GK	ROU	Bogdan Dascălu (from ASU Politehnica Timișoara)
—	GK	ROU	Alexandru Greab (from Gaz Metan Mediaș)
—	DF	ROU	Mihai Leca (from Daco-Getica București)
—	DF	ROU	Gabriel Matei (from (Poland) Termalica Nieciecza)
—	MF	ROU	Cristian Balgiu (from Academica Clinceni, previously on loan at Daco-Getica București)
—	MF	ARG	Nicolás Gorobsov (from (United States) Miami United)
—	MF	ROU	Petre Ivanovici (from Voluntari)
—	MF	ROU	Adrian Ropotan (from (United Arab Emirates) Hatta Club)
—	FW	JOR	Tha'er Bawab (from Dinamo București, previously on loan)
—	FW	CIV	Ghislain Guessan (from Free agent)
—	FW	ROU	Simon Măzărache (from CS U Craiova)

Out:

No.	Pos.	Nation	Player
—	MF	ROU	Bogdan Petrescu (loan return to Victoria București, later on loan at Farul Constanța)
—	GK	ROU	Daniel Isvoranu (on loan to Petrolul Ploiești, previously on loan at Turris-Oltul Turnu Măgurele)
—	GK	LTU	Armantas Vitkauskas (to (Lithuania) Žalgiris)
—	DF	ROU	Codruț Anghel (to Național Sebiș)
—	DF	CRO	Stjepan Babić (to Free agent)
—	DF	CTA	Manassé Enza-Yamissi (to (France) Annecy)
—	DF	ROU	Andrei Patache (to Botoșani)
—	DF	ROU	Robert Riza (on loan to Metaloglobus București)
—	MF	ROU	Lucian Asanache (to Free agent, previously on loan at Metaloglobus București)
—	MF	ROU	Cristian Balgiu (on loan to Turris-Oltul Turnu Măgurele)
—	MF	ROU	Claudiu Bumba (to (Turkey) Adanaspor)
—	MF	ROU	Mădălin Calu (to Dacia Unirea Brăila)
—	MF	ROU	Vladimir Georgescu (on loan to Daco-Getica București)
—	MF	ROU	Vasile Gheorghe (to Argeș Pitești, previously on loan at Daco-Getica București)
—	MF	ROU	Marian Ghiță (on loan to Balotești)
—	MF	ROU	Cristian Novacek (on loan to Alexandria)
—	FW	ROU	Cristian Bud (to (Switzerland) Yverdon)
—	FW	ROU	Florin Cioablă (to Turris-Oltul Turnu Măgurele)
—	FW	ROU	Alexandru Cîmpanu (to Alexandria)
—	FW	ROU	Constantin Clătinici (to Balotești)
—	FW	ROU	Ovidiu Marin (on loan to Balotești, previously signed from Înainte Modelu)
—	FW	ROU	Marius Pena (Retired)
—	FW	ROU	Robert Răducanu (to Viitorul Constanța, previously on loan)
—	FW	ROU	Giani Stere (to ACS Poli Timișoara)

=== CS U Craiova ===
In:

No.	Pos.	Nation	Player
—	DF	ROU	Sorin Sima (loan return from Dacia Unirea Brăila)
—	GK	ITA	Mirko Pigliacelli (on loan from (Italy) Pescara, previously on loan at (Italy) Pro Vercelli)
—	GK	ROU	Eduard Stăncioiu (from FCSB)
—	DF	GHA	Isaac Donkor (from (Italy) Cesena)
—	DF	ROU	Florin Gardoș (from (England) Southampton, previously on loan)
—	MF	ROU	Alexandru Cicâldău (from Viitorul Constanța)
—	MF	SUI	Matteo Fedele (on loan from (Italy) Foggia, previously on loan at (Italy) Cesena)
—	MF	ROU	Alin Țegle (from Luceafărul Oradea)
—	FW	BIH	Elvir Koljić (from (Bosnia and Herzegovina) Krupa, previously on loan at (Poland) Lech Poznań)
—	FW	PAR	César Meza (from (Azerbaijan) Keşla)
—	FW	CPV	Nuno Rocha (from (Russia) Tosno)

Out:

No.	Pos.	Nation	Player
—	MF	POR	André Santos (loan return to (Portugal) Arouca)
—	GK	SUI	Miodrag Mitrović (to Free agent)
—	DF	BUL	Apostol Popov (to (Bulgaria) CSKA 1948 Sofia)
—	MF	ROU	Lucian Buzan (on loan to Dunărea Călărași)
—	MF	ROU	Stephan Drăghici (on loan to Sepsi Sfântu Gheorghe, previously on loan at Daco-Getica București)
—	MF	BRA	Gustavo (to (China) Liaoning Whowin)
—	MF	ROU	Alin Manea (on loan to Chindia Târgoviște, previously on loan at Dacia Unirea Brăila)
—	MF	ITA	Fausto Rossi (to Free agent)
—	MF	ROU	Vladimir Screciu (to (Belgium) Genk)
—	MF	BUL	Hristo Zlatinski (to FCSB)
—	FW	ROU	Alexandru Băluță (to (Czech Republic) Slavia Prague)
—	FW	ROU	Sergiu Jurj (on loan to Rapid București, previously on loan at Chindia Târgoviște)
—	FW	ROU	Simon Măzărache (to Concordia Chiajna)
—	FW	ROU	Alexandru Popescu (on loan to Mioveni, previously on loan at Academica Clinceni)
—	FW	ROU	Mihai Roman II (on loan to Botoșani, previously on loan at Poli Timișoara)

=== Dinamo București ===
In:

No.	Pos.	Nation	Player
—	GK	ROU	Alexandru Burci (loan return from Metaloglobus București)
—	GK	ROU	Mihai Eșanu (loan return from Balotești)
—	DF	ROU	Denis Ciobotariu (loan return from Chindia Târgoviște)
—	MF	ROU	Andrei Tîrcoveanu (loan return from Gaz Metan Mediaș)
—	FW	ROU	Mihai Neicuțescu (loan return from Chindia Târgoviște)
—	DF	BEL	Kino Delorge (from (Belgium) Genk, previously on loan at (Netherlands) Dordrecht)
—	DF	ROU	Marco Ehmann (from Free agent)
—	DF	FRA	Teddy Mézague (from (Belgium) Royal Excel Mouscron)
—	MF	PAN	Armando Cooper (from Universidad de Chile)
—	MF	CRO	Tomislav Gomelt (from (Croatia) Rijeka, previously on loan at (Spain) Lorca)
—	MF	ROU	Sergiu Popovici (from Gaz Metan Mediaș)
—	MF	ROU	Deian Sorescu (from ASU Politehnica Timișoara)
—	FW	ROU	Mircea Axente (from Botoșani)
—	FW	ROU	Gheorghe Grozav (from (Turkey) Bursaspor)

Out:

No.	Pos.	Nation	Player
—	GK	ROU	Laurențiu Brănescu (loan return to (Italy) Juventus, later on loan to (Croatia) Gorica)
—	GK	ROU	Alexandru Burci (to Free agent, previously on loan at Metaloglobus București)
—	DF	ROU	Constantin Nica (loan return to (Italy) Atalanta)
—	MF	ROU	Gabriel Torje (loan return to (Russia) Akhmat Grozny, later signed by (Turkey) Sivasspor)
—	DF	ROU	Vlad Motroc (to Daco-Getica București)
—	GK	ROU	Iustin Popescu (to Chindia Târgoviște, previously on loan)
—	DF	ROU	Roberto Anghel (to Popești-Leordeni, previously on loan)
—	DF	ROU	Constantin Dima (to Viitorul Constanța, previously on loan at Sepsi Sfântu Gheorghe)
—	DF	ROU	Alin Dudea (on loan to Chindia Târgoviște)
—	DF	ARG	Maximiliano Oliva (to (Cyprus) Enosis Neon Paralimni, previously on loan at ACS Poli Timișoara)
—	DF	CRO	Luka Marić (to (Poland) Arka Gdynia)
—	DF	ESP	José Romera (to (Spain) Almería)
—	MF	ROU	Ion Gheorghe (to Voluntari)
—	MF	ROU	Liviu Gheorghe (on loan to Dacia Unirea Brăila)
—	MF	RSA	May Mahlangu (to (Bulgaria) Ludogorets Razgrad)
—	MF	ROU	Laurențiu Manole (to Voluntari, previously on loan at Gaz Metan Mediaș)
—	MF	ROU	Andreas Mihaiu (on loan to Chindia Târgoviște, previously on loan at Turris-Oltul Turnu Măgurele)
—	MF	ESP	Aitor Monroy (to Dunărea Călărași)
—	MF	CRO	Antun Palić (to (Moldova) Sheriff Tiraspol)
—	MF	ROU	Patrick Petre (to Politehnica Iași)
—	MF	ROU	Mihnea Vlad (on loan to Turris-Oltul Turnu Măgurele, previously on loan at Oțelul Galați)
—	FW	JOR	Tha'er Bawab (to Concordia Chiajna, previously on loan)
—	FW	SVK	Adam Nemec (to (Cyprus) Pafos)
—	FW	ROU	Silviu Oprescu (to Flacăra Moreni, previously on loan at FCM Alexandria)
—	FW	SUI	Danijel Subotić (to Free agent, previously transferred from (Kazakhstan) Shakhter Karagandy)

=== Dunărea Călărași ===
In:

No.	Pos.	Nation	Player
—	MF	ROU	Alexandru Dincă (loan return from Metaloglobus București)
—	GK	ROU	Cătălin Straton (from ACS Poli Timișoara)
—	DF	MKD	Filip Gligorov (from (North Macedonia) Sileks)
—	DF	ROU	Denis Ispas (from Energeticianul)
—	DF	ROU	Gabriel Simion (on loan from FCSB, previously on loan at Daco-Getica București)
—	DF	ROU	Alin Șeroni (from ACS Poli Timișoara)
—	DF	BRA	Walace (from Voluntari)
—	MF	ROU	Alexandru Bourceanu (from (Russia) Arsenal Tula)
—	MF	ROU	Lucian Buzan (on loan from CS U Craiova)
—	MF	ROU	Stelian Cucu (from Botoșani)
—	MF	ROU	Georgian Honciu (from Energeticianul)
—	MF	ESP	Aitor Monroy (from Dinamo București)
—	MF	ROU	Alexandru Munteanu (from ACS Poli Timișoara)
—	FW	ROU	Alin Babei (from Sepsi Sfântu Gheorghe, previously on loan at KSE Târgu Secuiesc)
—	FW	ROU	Nicolae Carnat (from (England) Wolverhampton)
—	FW	FRA	Sacha Clémence (from (France) Tours)
—	FW	FRA	Hamidou Keyta (from (France) Chambly)
—	FW	ROU	Marc Khalil (from Astra Giurgiu)
—	FW	SEN	Mediop Ndiaye (from Ripensia Timișoara)

Out:

No.	Pos.	Nation	Player
—	DF	ROU	Bogdan Manole (loan return to Sporting Pitești, later signed by Afumați)
—	MF	ROU	Cătălin Doman (loan return to ACS Poli Timișoara, later signed by Free agent)
—	MF	ROU	Paul Iacob (loan return to Viitorul Constanța)
—	FW	ROU	Alexandru Stoica (loan return to Viitorul Constanța)
—	FW	CRO	Dino Špehar (loan return to CFR Cluj, later signed by (Albania) Kukësi)
—	GK	ROU	Florin Muntean (to Aerostar Bacău)
—	GK	ROU	Rareș Șerban (to Gloria Buzău)
—	DF	ROU	Ionuț Balaur (to Voluntari, previously signed from Voluntari)
—	DF	ROU	Ștefan Mardare (to CSMȘ Reșița)
—	DF	ROU	Silviu Matei (on loan to Oltenița)
—	DF	ROU	Marius Tomozei (to Energeticianul)
—	MF	ROU	Călin Cristea (to Energeticianul)
—	MF	ROU	Laurențiu Marinescu (to Petrolul Ploiești, previously signed from Voluntari)
—	MF	ROU	Gabriel Preoteasa (on loan to Luceafărul Oradea)
—	MF	ROU	Bogdan Vasile (to Chindia Târgoviște)
—	FW	ROU	Alexandru Avram (to Oțelul Galați)
—	FW	ROU	Bogdan Danciu (to Gloria Buzău, previously on loan at Oțelul Galați)
—	FW	ROU	Alexandru Dincă (to Turris-Oltul Turnu Măgurele)
—	FW	ROU	Ciprian Rus (to UTA Arad)

=== FCSB ===
In:

No.	Pos.	Nation	Player
—	MF	ROU	Daniel Benzar (loan return from Voluntari)
—	MF	BRA	William De Amorim (loan return from (Turkey) Kayserispor)
—	MF	CRO	Antonio Jakoliš (loan return from (Cyprus) Apollon Limassol)
—	MF	ROU	Paul Szecui (loan return from Metaloglobus București)
—	DF	ROU	Alexandru Stan (from Astra Giurgiu)
—	MF	ROU	Olimpiu Moruțan (from Botoșani)
—	MF	ROU	Mihai Roman (from Botoșani)
—	MF	BUL	Hristo Zlatinski (from CS U Craiova)
—	FW	ROU	Raul Rusescu (from (Turkey) Osmanlıspor)

Out:

No.	Pos.	Nation	Player
—	DF	POR	Artur Jorge (loan return to (Portugal) Braga, later signed by (Portugal) Vitória Setúbal)
—	GK	ROU	Eduard Stăncioiu (to CS U Craiova)
—	DF	ROU	Alexandru Aldea (to CSA Steaua București)
—	DF	ROU	Valerică Găman (to (Saudi Arabia) Al-Shabab)
—	DF	ROU	Ionuț Larie (to (Kazakhstan) Tobol)
—	DF	ROU	Marian Pleașcă (to Free agent, previously on loan at Voluntari)
—	DF	ROU	Gabriel Simion (on loan to Dunărea Călărași, previously on loan at Daco-Getica București)
—	MF	ROU	Vlad Achim (to Viitorul Constanța, previously on loan at Botoșani)
—	MF	ROU	Rareș Enceanu (to Argeș Pitești)
—	MF	ROU	Cătălin Golofca (to Botoșani, previously on loan)
—	MF	ROU	Mario Mihai (on loan to Turris-Oltul Turnu Măgurele, previously on loan at Academica Clinceni)
—	MF	ROU	Cristian Tănase (to (Turkey) Eskişehirspor)
—	MF	ALB	Kamer Qaka (to Politehnica Iași, previously signed from Politehnica Iași)
—	FW	ROU	Denis Alibec (to Astra Giurgiu)
—	FW	ROU	Constantin Budescu (to (Saudi Arabia) Al-Shabab)

=== Gaz Metan Mediaș ===
In:

No.	Pos.	Nation	Player
—	DF	ROU	Răzvan Trif (loan return from Luceafărul Oradea)
—	MF	ROU	Mihai Stancu (loan return from Hermannstadt)
—	GK	POR	Ricardo Batista (from Free agent)
—	DF	FRA	Bradley Diallo (from Free agent)
—	DF	POR	André Micael (from (Portugal) Moreirense)
—	MF	POR	Luís Aurélio (from (Portugal) Feirense)
—	MF	GUI	Boubacar Fofana (from (Portugal) Moreirense)
—	MF	BUL	Antoni Ivanov (from (Bulgaria) Septemvri Sofia)
—	FW	POR	Carlos Fortes (from (Portugal) Vizela)
—	FW	POR	Yazalde (from (Portugal) Belenenses)

Out:

No.	Pos.	Nation	Player
—	MF	ROU	Laurențiu Manole (loan return to Dinamo București, later signed by Voluntari)
—	MF	ROU	Andrei Tîrcoveanu (loan return to Dinamo București)
—	GK	ROU	Sebastian Ciuperceanu (to Odorheiu Secuiesc, previously on loan at Unirea Alba Iulia)
—	GK	ROU	Alexandru Greab (to Concordia Chiajna)
—	DF	POR	João Diogo (to Free agent)
—	DF	GRE	Sokratis Fytanidis (to Free agent)
—	DF	ROU	Paul Pîrvulescu (to Politehnica Iași)
—	DF	ROU	Cristian Sîrghi (to (Albania) Flamurtari Vlorë)
—	DF	ROU	Tamás Szász (to ASU Politehnica Timișoara)
—	MF	SWE	Alexander Fioretos (to (Sweden) Torn)
—	MF	SRB	Milan Mitić (to Free agent)
—	MF	ROU	Ionuț Neagu (to Free agent)
—	MF	ROU	Sergiu Popovici (to Dinamo București)
—	MF	POR	Diogo Rosado (to Free agent)
—	FW	POR	Edinho Júnior (to (Portugal) Ferreiras)
—	FW	VEN	Mario Rondón (to (China) Shijiazhuang Ever Bright)

=== Hermannstadt ===
In:

No.	Pos.	Nation	Player
—	GK	ROU	Răzvan Began (from Foresta Suceava)
—	DF	ESP	Biel Company (from (Cyprus) Pafos)
—	DF	ROU	Alexandru Dandea (from Astra Giurgiu)
—	DF	MNE	Nemanja Mijušković (from (Russia) Tosno)
—	MF	EST	Ilja Antonov (from (Slovenia) Rudar Velenje)
—	MF	POR	Pedro Moreira (from (Portugal) Rio Ave)
—	MF	COD	Jordan Nkololo (from (France) Caen)
—	MF	ROU	Tiberiu Serediuc (from Botoșani)
—	MF	ROU	Ruben Sumanariu (from Foresta Suceava)
—	FW	MKD	Besart Abdurahimi (from (Albania) Partizani Tirana)
—	FW	BOL	Luis Alí (from (Brazil) Ponte Preta)
—	FW	GRE	Bruno Chalkiadakis (from (Greece) PAS Giannina)
—	FW	CPV	Kuca (from (Portugal) Boavista)
—	FW	CGO	Juvhel Tsoumou (from (Cyprus) Ermis Aradippou)

Out:

No.	Pos.	Nation	Player
—	DF	ROU	Radu Crișan (loan return to Astra Giurgiu)
—	MF	ROU	Robert Boboc (loan return to Astra Giurgiu)
—	MF	ROU	Mihai Stancu (loan return to Gaz Metan Mediaș)
—	DF	ROU	Andrei Mărginean (to Free agent, previously on loan at Performanța Ighiu)
—	DF	ROU	Paul Medeșan (to Viitorul Șelimbăr, previously on loan at Performanța Ighiu)
—	DF	ROU	Gabriel Oiță (to Vulturii Fărcășești)
—	DF	ROU	Alexandru Străulea (to Free agent)
—	DF	ROU	Radu Zaharia (to Free agent, previously signed from (Cyprus) Ermis Aradippou)
—	MF	ROU	Marius Cătinean (to Unirea Dej)
—	MF	ROU	Cristian Chifu (to Odorheiu Secuiesc)
—	MF	ROU	Alexandru Coman (to Universitatea Cluj)
—	MF	ROU	Cristian Danci (to Petrolul Ploiești)
—	MF	ROU	Sabin Lupu (to FC U Craiova)
—	MF	ROU	George Monea (on loan to Ripensia Timișoara)
—	MF	ROU	Alexandru Neacșa (to Energeticianul, previously on loan at Luceafărul Oradea)
—	MF	ROU	Radu Necșulescu (on loan to Metalurgistul Cugir, previously on loan at Oțelul Galați)
—	MF	ROU	Cosmin Neagu (to Energeticianul)
—	MF	ROU	Iulian Popa (Retired)
—	MF	ROU	Olivian Surugiu (to FC U Craiova)
—	FW	ROU	Dragoș Mucuță (to Dacia Unirea Brăila)
—	FW	ROU	Cristian Seiwerth (to Free agent, previously on loan at Performanța Ighiu)
—	FW	ROU	Alexandru Târnovan (to Free agent)
—	FW	ROU	Daniel Unguru (to Filiași, previously on loan at Performanța Ighiu)

=== Politehnica Iași ===
In:

No.	Pos.	Nation	Player
—	GK	ROU	Alberto Cobrea (from Botoșani)
—	GK	ROU	Ștefan Târnovanu (loan return from Știința Miroslava)
—	DF	GHA	George Dwubeng (on loan from (Ghana) Dreams)
—	DF	ESP	Adrià Gallego (from (Spain) Atlético Saguntino)
—	DF	ROU	Paul Pîrvulescu (from Gaz Metan Mediaș)
—	DF	ROU	Laurențiu Rus (from CFR Cluj)
—	MF	CRC	Dylan Flores (from (Costa Rica) Cartaginés)
—	MF	FRA	Martin Mimoun (from (France) Paris)
—	MF	FRA	Daudet N'Dongala (from (Bulgaria) Botev Plovdiv)
—	MF	NED	Moussa Sanoh (from (England) Crawley Town)
—	MF	ROU	Patrick Petre (from Dinamo București)
—	MF	ROU	Iulian Roșu (from Metaloglobus București)
—	MF	ALB	Kamer Qaka (from FCSB, previously transferred to FCSB)
—	FW	ANG	Aguinaldo (from (Thailand) Ubon United)
—	FW	GHA	Lawson Bekui (on loan from (Oman) Dhofar Club)
—	FW	CMR	Lewis Enoh (from (Belgium) Lokeren)
—	FW	CPV	Platini (from (Iran) Sanat Naft, previously transferred to (Iran) Sanat Naft)

Out:

No.	Pos.	Nation	Player
—	FW	BRA	Jô Santos (loan return to (Moldova) Sheriff Tiraspol)
—	GK	ROU	Teodor Axinte (on loan to Lugoj, previously on loan at Turris-Oltul Turnu Măgurele)
—	GK	CRO	Ivan Kelava (to (Croatia) Inter Zaprešić)
—	GK	MDA	Alexei Koșelev (to (Netherlands) Fortuna Sittard)
—	DF	LVA	Vitālijs Jagodinskis (to (Latvia) Ventspils)
—	DF	ROU	Andu Moisi (to Național Sebiș, previously on loan at Știința Miroslava)
—	MF	ROU	Robert Asăvoaei (to Gloria Buzău, previously on loan at Știința Miroslava)
—	MF	ROU	Robert Dodan (on loan to Știința Miroslava)
—	MF	ROU	Bogdan Gavrilă (to (Malta) Valletta)
—	MF	UGA	Luwagga Kizito (on loan to (Belarus) BATE Borisov)
—	MF	POR	Pedro Mendes (to (Latvia) Ventspils)
—	MF	ROU	Cătălin Ștefănescu (on loan to Petrolul Ploiești)
—	MF	ROU	Alexandru Taciuc (to CSMȘ Reșița, previously on loan at Știința Miroslava)
—	FW	ROU	Teodor Chirilă (on loan to Știința Miroslava)
—	FW	GUI	Salim Cissé (to Free agent)
—	FW	ROU	Sabin Moldovan (on loan to Alexandria, previously on loan at Academica Clinceni)

=== Sepsi Sfântu Gheorghe ===
In:

No.	Pos.	Nation	Player
—	GK	ROU	Relu Stoian (from Daco-Getica București)
—	DF	BRA	Gabriel (from (Portugal) Gil Vicente)
—	DF	GER	Igor Jovanović (from (Finland) Lahti)
—	DF	ROU	Adrián Rus (from (Hungary) Balmazújváros)
—	DF	ROU	Florin Ștefan (from Daco-Getica București)
—	MF	ROU	Stephan Drăghici (on loan from CS U Craiova, previously on loan at Daco-Getica București)
—	MF	ROU	István Fülöp (from (Hungary) Diósgyőr, previously on loan)
—	MF	BLR	Alyaksandr Karnitsky (from (Russia) Tosno)
—	MF	GHA	Joseph Mensah (from Free agent)
—	MF	FRA	Bryan Nouvier (on loan from CFR Cluj)
—	MF	ROU	Gabriel Vașvari (from ACS Poli Timișoara)
—	MF	BUL	Stefan Velev (from (Bulgaria) Slavia Sofia)
—	FW	ROU	Gabriel Dodoi (on loan from CFR Cluj)
—	FW	ROU	Nicolae Păun (from Viitorul Nicolae Georgescu, previously on loan at KSE Târgu Secuiesc)
—	FW	HUN	Dániel Prosser (on loan from (Hungary) Puskás Akadémia)

Out:

No.	Pos.	Nation	Player
—	DF	ROU	Constantin Dima (loan return to Dinamo București, later signed by Viitorul Constanța)
—	MF	MKD	Milovan Petrovikj (loan return to (Croatia) Osijek, later signed by (Greece) AEL)
—	GK	MKD	Marko Jovanovski (to (North Macedonia) Makedonija GP, previously signed from Free agent)
—	DF	ROU	Marius Burlacu (to SR Brașov)
—	DF	ESP	Albert Dalmau (to (Spain) Lleida Esportiu)
—	DF	ROU	Florin Dumbravă (to ACS Poli Timișoara, later signed by SR Brașov)
—	DF	ROU	Constantin Grecu (to FC U Craiova)
—	MF	ROU	Alexandru Chiriță (to Free agent)
—	MF	ROU	Sebastian Ghinga (to Petrolul Ploiești)
—	MF	CRO	Jure Obšivač (to (Kazakhstan) Atyrau)
—	MF	POR	Filipe Oliveira (to Free agent)
—	MF	ESP	Alex Rodriguez (to (Scotland) Motherwell)
—	MF	SCO	Nick Ross (to Free agent)
—	FW	ROU	Alin Babei (to Dunărea Călărași, previously on loan at KSE Târgu Secuiesc)
—	FW	NGA	Benjamin Kuku (to (Israel) Hapoel Kfar Saba)
—	FW	ROU	Marius Ștefănescu (on loan to KSE Târgu Secuiesc, previously signed from KSE Târgu Secuiesc)

=== Viitorul Constanța ===
In:

No.	Pos.	Nation	Player
—	MF	ROU	Paul Iacob (loan return from Dunărea Călărași)
—	FW	ROU	Alexandru Stoica (loan return from Dunărea Călărași)
—	DF	ROU	Robert Băjan (from Pandurii Târgu Jiu)
—	DF	ROU	Constantin Dima (from Dinamo București, previously on loan at Sepsi Sfântu Gheorghe)
—	DF	ROU	Srdjan Luchin (from CFR Cluj)
—	MF	ROU	Vlad Achim (from FCSB, previously on loan at Botoșani)
—	MF	ROU	Andrei Artean (from ACS Poli Timișoara)
—	MF	ROU	Vlad Chera (from CNP Timișoara)
—	MF	FRA	Lyes Houri (from (France) Lens B)
—	MF	RUS	Amir Natkho (from (Russia) Lokomotiv Moscow)
—	FW	ROU	Robert Răducanu (from Concordia Chiajna, previously on loan)

Out:

No.	Pos.	Nation	Player
—	GK	MDA	Sebastian Agachi (on loan to Pucioasa)
—	GK	ROU	Cosmin Dur-Bozoancă (on loan to Universitatea Cluj, previously on loan at ASU Politehnica Timișoara)
—	GK	ROU	Ionuț Gurău (on loan to Gloria Buzău, previously on loan at Farul Constanța)
—	GK	ROU	Rareș Micu (on loan to Medgidia)
—	GK	ROU	Haralambie Mociu (on loan to Medgidia)
—	GK	ROU	Rareș Murariu (on loan to ASU Politehnica Timișoara)
—	GK	ROU	Mihai Popa (to Farul Constanța)
—	GK	ROU	Árpád Tordai (on loan to Petrolul Ploiești)
—	DF	ROU	Paul Acasandrei (on loan to Axiopolis Cernavodă)
—	DF	ROU	Mădălin Androne (on loan to Gloria Buzău, previously on loan at Farul Constanța)
—	DF	ROU	Tiberiu Căpușă (on loan to Universitatea Cluj)
—	DF	ROU	Cristian Ganea (to (Spain) Athletic Bilbao)
—	DF	ROU	Darius Grosu (on loan to Afumați)
—	DF	ROU	Robert Hodorogea (on loan to Voluntari)
—	DF	ROU	Răzvan Horj (to (Hungary) Újpest, previously on loan at Voluntari)
—	DF	ROU	Szabolcs Kilyen (on loan to Mioveni, previously on loan at Miercurea Ciuc)
—	DF	ROU	Cosmin Piciu (to Sporting Roșiori, previously on loan at Metalul Buzău)
—	DF	ROU	Răzvan Prodan (on loan to Farul Constanța)
—	DF	ROU	Sorin Rădoi (Retired)
—	DF	ROU	Andrei Rusu (on loan to Medgidia)
—	DF	ROU	Alexandru Sabangeanu (on loan to Farul Constanța)
—	DF	ROU	Nicholas Suflaru (on loan to Medgidia)
—	MF	ROU	Alexandru Cicâldău (to CS U Craiova)
—	MF	ROU	Antonio Cruceru (to Petrolul Ploiești)
—	MF	ROU	Doru Dumitrescu (on loan to Universitatea Cluj)
—	MF	ROU	Mihai Ene (on loan to Petrolul Ploiești)
—	MF	ROU	Eduard Florescu (to Botoșani, previously signed from Mioveni)
—	MF	ROU	Giani Gherghiceanu (on loan to Alexandria)
—	MF	ROU	Robert Grecu (on loan to Petrolul Ploiești, previously on loan at Argeș Pitești)
—	MF	ROU	Florin Nicolescu (to Free agent, previously on loan at Afumați)
—	MF	ROU	Rareș Oană (on loan to Sporting Liești)
—	MF	GHA	Kofi Twumasi (to Universitatea Cluj)
—	MF	ROU	Raul Vidrășan (on loan to ASU Politehnica Timișoara)
—	FW	ROU	Romeo Bănică (on loan to ASU Politehnica Timișoara)
—	FW	ROU	Cristian Ene (to Universitatea Cluj)
—	FW	ROU	Cristian Gavra (to Universitatea Cluj)
—	FW	ROU	Mircea Manole (to Rapid București, previously on loan at Afumați)
—	FW	ROU	Cezar Mihalache (on loan to Argeș Pitești, previously on loan at Chindia Târgoviște)
—	FW	ROU	Cătălin Țîră (to Luceafărul Oradea, previously signed from Energeticianul)

=== Voluntari ===
In:

No.	Pos.	Nation	Player
—	GK	ROU	Dinu Moldovan (from Free agent)
—	GK	ROU	Cosmin Vâtcă (from CFR Cluj)
—	DF	MDA	Igor Armaș (from (Russia) Anzhi Makhachkala)
—	DF	ROU	Ionuț Balaur (from Dunărea Călărași, previously transferred to Dunărea Călărași)
—	DF	ROU	Robert Hodorogea (on loan from Viitorul Constanța)
—	DF	FRA	Aïssa Laïdouni (from (France) Angers, previously on loan at (France) Chambly)
—	DF	POR	Ricardinho (from (Portugal) Gil Vicente)
—	DF	ROU	Alexandru Vlad (from CFR Cluj)
—	DF	CRO	Ivan Zgrablić (from (Croatia) Istra 1961)
—	MF	FRA	Abdelhak Belahmeur (from (France) Avranches)
—	MF	ROU	Alexandru Ciucur (from ACS Poli Timișoara)
—	MF	ROU	Ion Gheorghe (from Dinamo București)
—	MF	ROU	Andrei Ionescu (from (India) Aizawl)
—	MF	ROU	Laurențiu Manole (from Dinamo București, previously on loan at Gaz Metan Mediaș)
—	MF	BIH	Ivan Sesar (from (Finland) Inter Turku)
—	FW	ROU	Florin Bălan (from Râmnicu Sărat)
—	FW	GHA	Richard Gadze (from (Azerbaijan) Zira)
—	FW	ROU	Gabriel Iancu (from (Poland) Termalica Nieciecza)
—	FW	BEL	Nathan Kabasele (from (Turkey) Gazişehir Gaziantep)
—	FW	MTQ	Geoffrey Malfleury (from (Cyprus) Alki Oroklini)

Out:

No.	Pos.	Nation	Player
—	GK	ROU	Mihai Mincă (loan return to Energeticianul, later signed by (Hungary) Kisvárda)
—	DF	ROU	Răzvan Horj (loan return to Viitorul Constanța, later signed by (Hungary) Újpest)
—	DF	ROU	Marian Pleașcă (loan return to FCSB)
—	MF	ROU	Daniel Benzar (loan return to FCSB)
—	GK	ROU	Dragoș Balauru (to Daco-Getica București)
—	GK	ROU	Virgil Drăghia (to Rapid București, previously signed from Daco-Getica București)
—	GK	ROU	George Gavrilaș (to Daco-Getica București, previously on loan)
—	DF	ROU	Cosmin Achim (on loan to Energeticianul)
—	DF	ESP	Alfonso Artabe (to Free agent, previously signed from (Cyprus) Ermis Aradippou)
—	DF	ROU	Lucian Cazan (to Petrolul Ploiești)
—	DF	ROU	Dragoș Cojocaru (to ASU Politehnica Timișoara)
—	DF	ROU	Vlad Gîsă (on loan to Chindia Târgoviște)
—	DF	ROU	Mircea Leasă (on loan to Energeticianul)
—	DF	ROU	Ionuț Moldovan (to Turris-Oltul Turnu Măgurele)
—	DF	FRA	Alphousseyni Sané (on loan to Metaloglobus București)
—	DF	ROU	Bogdan Szijj (to CSMȘ Reșița, previously signed from CSMȘ Reșița)
—	DF	BRA	Walace (to Dunărea Călărași, previously signed from Daco-Getica București)
—	MF	ROU	Marius Bîrsan (on loan to Metaloglobus București)
—	MF	ROU	Eduard Călin (to (Spain) Villanovense, previously signed from (Malta) Tarxien Rainbows)
—	MF	ROU	Constantin Costache (on loan to Metaloglobus București)
—	MF	ROU	Robert Constantinescu (on loan to Afumați)
—	MF	ROU	Marius Grigore (to Daco-Getica București)
—	MF	ROU	Petre Ivanovici (to Concordia Chiajna)
—	MF	ROU	Laurențiu Manole (on loan to Energeticianul)
—	MF	ROU	Laurențiu Marinescu (to Dunărea Călărași, later signed by Petrolul Ploiești)
—	MF	ROU	Bogdan Mirică (to Cetate Deva)
—	MF	ROU	Daniel Novac (to Chindia Târgoviște)
—	MF	ROU	Lucian Sânmărtean (Retired)
—	FW	ROU	Florin Cernat (Retired)
—	FW	ROU	Alexandru Stoica (on loan to Balotești)
—	FW	ROU	Adrian Voicu (to Daco-Getica București)
