= Constantin Secăreanu =

Romanian footballer

Personal information
- Date of birth: 11 January 1982 (age 44)
- Place of birth: Buzău, Romania
- Height: 1.85 m (6 ft 1 in)
- Position: Central defender

Senior career*
Years	Team	Apps	(Gls)
1998–2000	Gloria Buzău	21	(0)
2000–2011	Sportul Studențesc București	178	(0)
Total		199	(0)
- * Club domestic league appearances and goals

Constantin Secăreanu (born 11 January 1982) is a Romanian former footballer who played as a defender.

== Honours ==
Sportul Studențesc București

- Divizia B: 2000–01, 2003–04
