= Dan Tulpan =

Romanian footballer

Personal information
- Date of birth: 10 June 1957 (age 69)
- Place of birth: Bucharest, Romania
- Position: Central defender

Youth career
- 1973–1974: Steaua București

Senior career*
Years	Team	Apps	(Gls)
1975–1980	Gloria Buzău (Note: The statistics for the 1975–76 Divizia B season are unavailable.)	126	(6)
1980–1984	Argeș Pitești	96	(2)
1984–1991	Gloria Buzău (Note: The statistics for the 1987–88, 1988–89, 1989–90 and 1990–91 seasons are unavailable.)	85	(5)
Total		307	(13)
Member of the Senate of Romania
In office 5 October 1993 – November 1996
Constituency	Buzău
- * Club domestic league appearances and goals

Dan Tulpan (born 10 June 1957) is a Romanian former footballer who played as a central defender. After he ended his playing career, Tulpan worked as president at Gloria Buzău. He was also a member of the Senate of Romania, being elected in Buzău, while running for PSD.

== Honours ==
Gloria Buzău

- Divizia B: 1977–78
