= Mădălin Mihăescu =

Romanian footballer (born 1988)

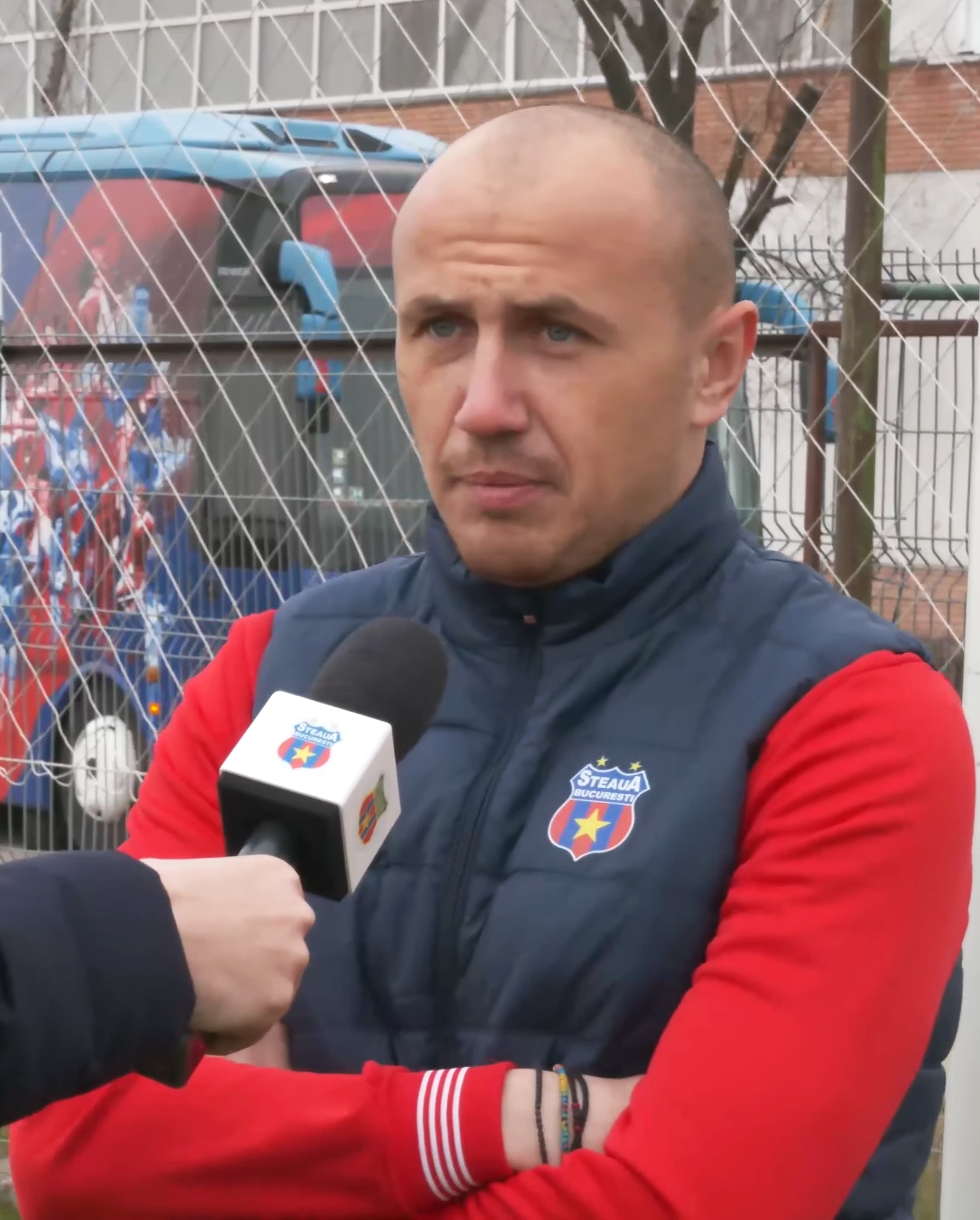
- Mădălin Mihăescu in 2021

Personal information
- Full name: Mădălin Licuță Mihăescu
- Date of birth: 21 October 1988 (age 38)
- Place of birth: Drobeta-Turnu Severin, Romania
- Height: 1.79 m (5 ft 10 in)
- Position: Defensive midfielder

Team information
- Current team: Tunari
- Number: 8

Youth career
- Dinamo București

Senior career*
Years	Team	Apps	(Gls)
2011	Dinamo II București	10	(0)
2012–2013	Chindia Târgoviște	17	(1)
2013–2014	FC Buzău	26	(0)
2014–2015	Olt Slatina	12	(0)
2015–2017	Daco-Getica	40	(3)
2018–2019	Politehnica Iași	21	(1)
2019–2020	Petrolul Ploiești	14	(0)
2020–2023	Steaua București	56	(2)
2023–	Tunari	8	(0)
- * Club domestic league appearances and goals as of 24 October 2023

Mădălin Licuță Mihăescu (born 21 October 1988) is a Romanian professional footballer who plays as a defensive midfielder for Tunari.

== Honours ==
Steaua București

- Liga III: 2020–21
