= Daniel Vîrtej =

Romanian footballer

Personal information
- Full name: Daniel Alexandru Vîrtej
- Date of birth: 28 October 1997 (age 29)
- Place of birth: Râmnicu Sărat, Romania
- Height: 1.91 m (6 ft 3 in)
- Position: Centre-back

Team information
- Current team: Sepsi OSK
- Number: 82

Youth career
- –2015: Olimpia Râmnicu Sărat

Senior career*
Years	Team	Apps	(Gls)
2015–2016	Gloria Buzău	24	(0)
2016–2018	Astra II Giurgiu		
2019–2021	Afumați		
2021–2023	Gloria Buzău	56	(1)
2023–2025	CSA Steaua București	50	(4)
2025–	Sepsi OSK	31	(0)
- * Club domestic league appearances and goals as of 8 November 2026

Daniel Alexandru Vîrtej (born 28 October 1997) is a Romanian professional footballer who plays as a centre-back for Liga I club Sepsi OSK.

== Honours ==
Afumați

- Liga III: 2020–21
