= Laurențiu Manole =

Romanian footballer

Personal information
- Full name: Laurențiu Ionuț Manole
- Date of birth: 7 January 1997 (age 29)
- Place of birth: Bucharest, Romania
- Height: 1.80 m (5 ft 11 in)
- Position: Midfielder

Youth career
- Dinamo București

Senior career*
Years	Team	Apps	(Gls)
2015–2018	Dinamo București	0	(0)
2016–2017	→ Braşov (loan)	32	(8)
2017	→ Sepsi OSK (loan)	11	(0)
2017–2018	→ Gaz Metan Mediaș (loan)	13	(1)
2018–2019	Voluntari	0	(0)
2018	→ Energeticianul (loan)	7	(0)
2019	→ Sportul Snagov (loan)	8	(1)
2019	Dunărea Călărași	0	(0)
2020	Dacia Unirea Brăila	0	(0)
2022–2024	Gloria Băneasa		
- * Club domestic league appearances and goals as of 9 January 2019

Laurențiu Manole (born 7 January 1997) is a Romanian professional footballer who plays for Dacia Unirea Brăila.

Manole was born in Bucharest and played youth football with Dinamo București, winning the Juniori B youth league in 2014, before starting his professional career with the club's senior team.

On 24 September 2015, he made his debut for Dinamo's senior squad in a 6th round Cupa României 2–3 win away at Dacia Unirea Brăila, before starting his half season long loan spell at FC Brașov in February 2016.

== Career statistics ==
As of match played 23 March 2017

Appearances and goals by club, season and competition
Club	Season	League			National Cup		League Cup		Europe		Other		Total	
Club	Season	Division	Apps	Goals	Apps	Goals	Apps	Goals	Apps	Goals	Apps	Goals	Apps	Goals
Dinamo București	2015–16	Liga I	0	0	1	0	0	0	–				1	0
Dinamo București	Total		0	0	0	0	0	0	0	0	0	0	1	0
Brașov (loan)	2015–16	Liga II	17	2	0	0	–						17	2
Brașov (loan)	2016–17	Liga II	18	7	0	0	–						18	7
Brașov (loan)	Total		35	9	0	0	0	0	0	0	0	0	35	9
Sepsi OSK (loan)	2016–17	Liga II	4	0	0	0	0	0	–				4	0
Sepsi OSK (loan)	Total		4	0	0	0	0	0	0	0	0	0	4	0
Career total			39	9	1	0	0	0	0	0	0	0	40	9
