= Sebastian Ghinga =

Romanian footballer

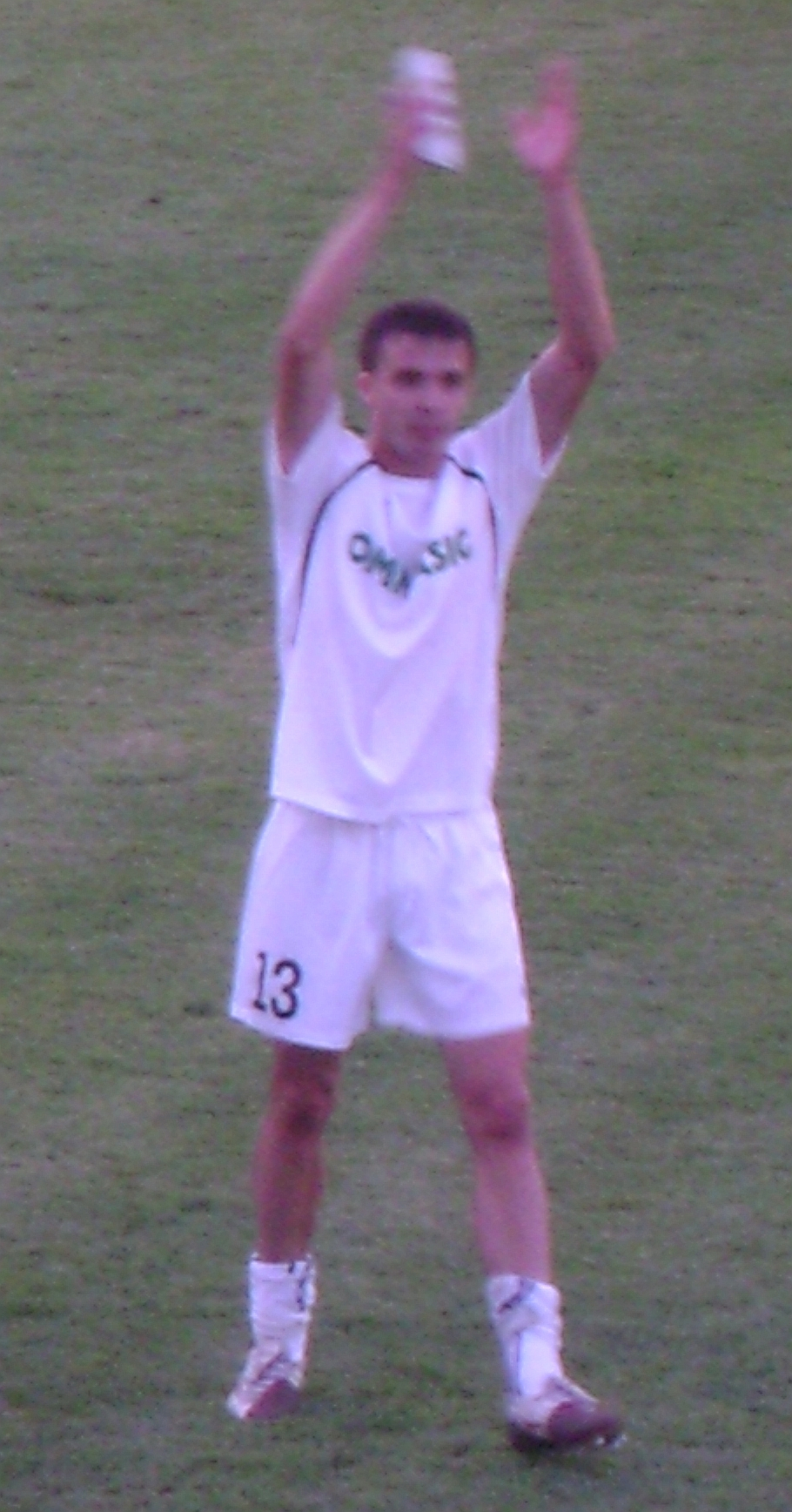
- Ghinga in 2010

Personal information
- Full name: Sebastian Marinel Ghinga
- Date of birth: 12 February 1987 (age 39)
- Place of birth: Bacău, Romania
- Height: 1.84 m (6 ft 0 in)
- Position: Defensive midfielder

Team information
- Current team: Metalul Buzău
- Number: 13

Youth career
- 1996–2001: Letea Bacău
- 2001–2004: Aerostar Bacău

Senior career*
Years	Team	Apps	(Gls)
2004–2006	Aerostar Bacău		
2007–2013	Sportul Studențesc	138	(8)
2013–2014	Botoșani	17	(0)
2016	Academica Clinceni	4	(0)
2016	Metalul Reșița	11	(2)
2017–2018	Sepsi OSK	42	(3)
2018–2019	Petrolul Ploiești	28	(3)
2019–2022	Gloria Buzău	43	(1)
2022	→ Metalul Buzău (loan)	8	(0)
2022–	Metalul Buzău	0	(0)
- * Club domestic league appearances and goals as of 07:20, 21 June 2022 (UTC)

Sebastian Marinel Ghinga (born 12 February 1987) is a Romanian professional footballer who plays as a midfielder for Metalul Buzău. In his career Ghinga also played for teams such as: Aerostar Bacău, Sportul Studențesc or Botoșani, among others.
