= Ciprian Petre =

Romanian footballer

Personal information
- Full name: Ciprian Cătălin Petre
- Date of birth: 10 December 1980 (age 45)
- Place of birth: Berca, Romania
- Height: 1.72 m (5 ft 8 in)
- Position: Winger

Team information
- Current team: Gloria Bistrița (assistant)

Senior career*
Years	Team	Apps	(Gls)
1999–2002	Petrolul Berca		
2002–2005	Juventus București	57	(2)
2005–2006	Jiul Petroşani	41	(3)
2007–2008	Unirea Urziceni	38	(2)
2008–2011	Gloria Bistrița	71	(2)
2011–2017	Gaz Metan Mediaş	153	(12)
2017–2018	Juventus București	28	(1)
2018–2022	Buzău	44	(13)
2019–2020	→ Focșani (loan)	14	(4)
2022	Focșani	6	(1)
2023–	Petrolul Berca	6	(5)
Total		458	(45)

Managerial career
- 2022–2023: Focșani (assistant)
- 2023–2024: Petrolul Berca (youth)
- 2024–: Gloria Bistrița (assistant)
- * Club domestic league appearances and goals as of 12:56, 8 November 2024 (UTC)

Ciprian Cătălin Petre (born 10 December 1980) is a Romanian former football player who played as winger for teams such as Juventus București, Unirea Urziceni, Gloria Bistrița, Gaz Metan Mediaş or Gloria Buzău, among others.

== Personal ==
He is often wrongly mistaken as being the older brother of Ovidiu Petre. The two are not related.

== Honours ==
Juventus București

- Liga III: 2002–03

Gaz Metan Mediaș

- Liga II: 2015–16

SCM Gloria Buzău

- Liga III: 2018–19
