= Marian Stoenac =

Romanian footballer

Personal information
- Full name: Marian Daniel Stoenac
- Date of birth: 30 June 1993 (age 33)
- Place of birth: Motru, Romania
- Height: 1.84 m (6 ft 0 in)
- Position: Midfielder

Team information
- Current team: Sporting Roșiori
- Number: 9

Youth career
- Minerul Motru

Senior career*
Years	Team	Apps	(Gls)
2013–2015	Minerul Motru	19	(0)
2015–2018	Juventus București	21	(6)
2017	→ Cetate Deva (loan)	10	(1)
2018	→ Șirineasa (loan)	10	(1)
2018	Energeticianul	15	(2)
2019	Filiași	10	(1)
2019–2021	FC U Craiova	21	(9)
2021–2022	Politehnica Iași	12	(0)
2022	Viitorul Târgu Jiu	2	(0)
2022	Viitorul Șimian	11	(8)
2023	Agricola Borcea	9	(10)
2023–	Sporting Roșiori	3	(1)
- * Club domestic league appearances and goals as of 16:59, 17 January 2024 (UTC)

Marian Daniel Stoenac (born 30 October 1993) is a Romanian professional footballer who plays as a midfielder for Sporting Roșiori.

== Honours ==
Minerul Motru

- Liga III: 2012–13

ACS Șirineasa

- Liga III: 2017–18

Juventus București

- Liga III: 2015–16

FC U Craiova 1948

- Liga II: 2020–21
- Liga III: 2019–20
