= Dan Bucșa =

Romanian footballer (born 1988)

Personal information
- Full name: Dan Mihai Bucșa
- Date of birth: 23 June 1988 (age 38)
- Place of birth: Dej, Romania
- Height: 1.80 m (5 ft 11 in)
- Position: Midfielder

Team information
- Current team: Unirea Dej (Caretaker Manager)
- Number: 21

Youth career
- 1995–1999: Unirea Dej
- 1999–2005: Luceafărul Dej
- 2005–2006: Dinamo București

Senior career*
Years	Team	Apps	(Gls)
2006–2012	Dinamo II București	117	(6)
2009–2010	→ Universitatea Cluj (loan)	19	(0)
2012	Dinamo București	2	(0)
2012	Bergisch Gladbach	14	(0)
2013–2014	Universitatea Cluj	59	(2)
2015	Győri ETO	10	(0)
2015	Târgu Mureș	0	(0)
2015–2016	Petrolul Ploiești	35	(0)
2016–2017	Hapoel Bnei Lod	36	(0)
2017	Juventus București	2	(0)
2017–2018	Concordia Chiajna	30	(0)
2019	Petrolul Ploiești	11	(1)
2020	Concordia Chiajna	2	(0)
2020–2020	Victoria Cluj	0	(0)

International career
2009	Romania U23	1	(0)

Managerial career
- 2020–2020: Victoria Cluj
- 2023-2025: Mintiu Gherlii (Player-Coach)
- 2025-2025: Unirea Dej (Assistant Manager)
- 2025-: Unirea Dej (Caretaker Manager)
- * Club domestic league appearances and goals as of 14 September 2020

Dan Mihai Bucșa (born 23 June 1988) is a former Romanian footballer and manager who manages for Liga III side Unirea Dej as Caretaker Manager.

== Career ==
=== Unirea Dej & Luceafărul Dej ===
Bucșa started his career in his home town, at Unirea Dej, and later at Luceafărul Dej.

=== Dinamo București ===
In 2006, when he was 18, he was bought by Dinamo București, being wanted by Mircea Rednic who often call him at the first team training sessions. He played for three years for the second Dinamo team where he became captain.

=== Universitatea Cluj ===
In July 2009, Bucșa joined Universitatea Cluj, the Liga II team that was bought by Florian Walter, former paymaster at Dinamo. During his spell at Cluj, he was called at the national U23 team, by Răzvan Lucescu. After only a year, Bucșa was released by Universitatea Cluj.

Then, he was closed to a transfer at Arieşul Turda, but everything fall out in the last moments.

=== Return to Dinamo București ===
After that, he decided to come back at Dinamo București. Bucșa played his first match in Liga I on 21 March 2012, in a game against Oțelul Galați.

=== Bergisch Gladbach ===
He was released from Dinamo in the summer of 2012 and signed a contract with the German team Bergisch Gladbach.

=== Return to Universitatea Cluj ===
After only four months, he ended his contract and came back to Romania, agreeing a contract with his former team Universitatea Cluj. In December 2014, he ended his contract with U.Cluj.

=== Return to Concordia Chiajna ===
On 21 February 2020, Concordia Chiajna presented Bucșa as their new player.
