= Costin Ciucureanu =

Romanian footballer

Personal information
- Date of birth: 29 May 2000 (age 26)
- Place of birth: Brăila, Romania
- Height: 1.80 m (5 ft 11 in)
- Position: Right midfielder

Senior career*
| Years | Team | Apps | (Gls) |
| 2017–2019 | Dacia Unirea Brăila | 60 | (3) |
| 2019–2022 | Concordia Chiajna | 34 | (2) |
| 2021–2022 | → Mioveni (loan) | 1 | (0) |
| 2022 | → Viitorul Ianca (loan) | 12 | (3) |
| 2022–2024 | Viitorul Ianca | 43 | (11) |
- * Club domestic league appearances and goals as of 16:07, 28 December 2024 (UTC)

Costin Ciucureanu (born 29 May 2000) is a Romanian professional footballer who plays as a right winger.
