= Valentin Bărbulescu =

Romanian footballer

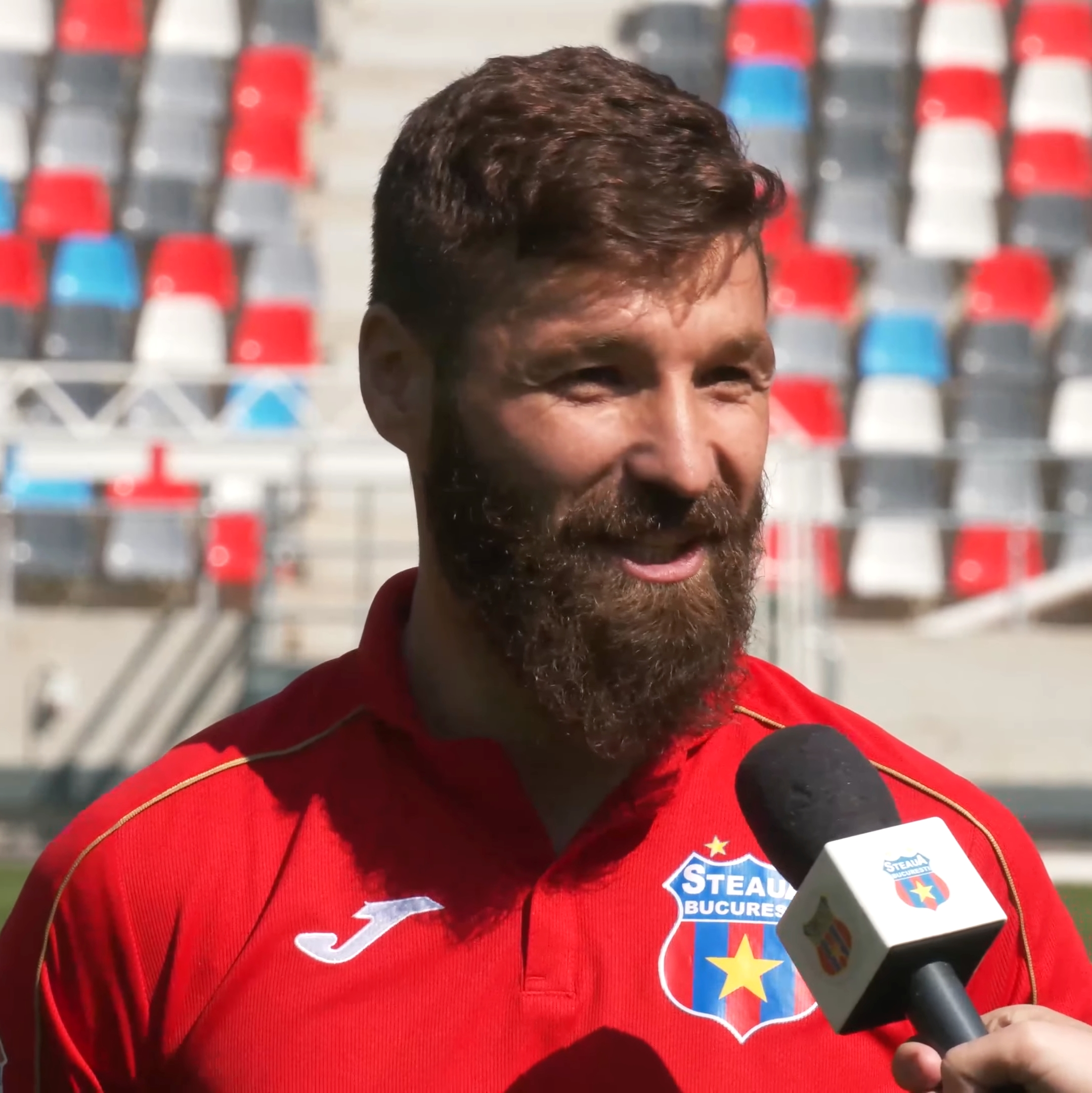
- Valentin Bărbulescu in 2021

Personal information
- Date of birth: 28 December 1985 (age 40)
- Place of birth: Bucharest, Romania
- Height: 1.77 m (5 ft 10 in)
- Position: Midfielder

Team information
- Current team: CSA Steaua București (video analyst)

Senior career*
Years	Team	Apps	(Gls)
2009–2010	Concordia Chiajna	31	(1)
2011–2012	Petrolul Ploiești	27	(1)
2012	Berceni		
2013	Damila Măciuca	10	(0)
2013	CSM Râmnicu Vâlcea	12	(0)
2014	Săgeata Năvodari	7	(0)
2015	Metalul Reșița	8	(0)
2015–2017	Juventus București	44	(0)
2018	CSMȘ Reșița	12	(0)
2018–2019	Sportul Snagov	24	(1)
2019	Concordia Chiajna	2	(0)
2019–2025	CSA Steaua București	66	(3)
Total		243	(3)

Managerial career
- 2025–: CSA Steaua București (video analyst)
- * Club domestic league appearances and goals

Valentin Bărbulescu (born 28 December 1985) is a former Romanian professional footballer who played as a midfielder, currently video analyst at Liga II club for CSA Steaua București.

== Honours ==
Petrolul Ploiești

- Liga II: 2010–11

Berceni

- Liga III: 2012–13

Juventus București

- Liga II: 2016–17
- Liga III: 2015–16

CSA Steaua București

- Liga III: 2020–21
- Liga IV – Bucharest: 2019–20
