= Robert Țicămucă =

Romanian footballer

Personal information
- Full name: Robert Lucian Țicămucă
- Date of birth: 19 June 1999 (age 27)
- Place of birth: Galați, Romania
- Height: 1.76 m (5 ft 9 in)
- Position: Forward

Team information
- Current team: Unirea Braniștea

Youth career
- Dinamo București
- Juventus București

Senior career*
Years	Team	Apps	(Gls)
2016–2018	Juventus București	2	(0)
2018	Sporting Liești	14	(7)
2019–2020	Oțelul Galați	23	(1)
2021	Sporting Liești	14	(1)
2022–	Unirea Braniștea	0	(0)
- * Club domestic league appearances and goals as of 14:28, 25 April 2022 (UTC)

Robert Lucian Țicămucă (born 19 June 1999) is a Romanian professional footballer who plays as a forward for Unirea Braniștea.
