= Charles Acolatse =

French footballer (born 1995)

Personal information
- Full name: Charles Benoit Koffi Acolatse
- Date of birth: 5 May 1995 (age 31)
- Place of birth: Paris, France
- Height: 1.81 m (5 ft 11 in)
- Position: Midfielder

Team information
- Current team: Riteriai
- Number: 28

Youth career
- Nantes
- –2014: Vannes

Senior career*
Years	Team	Apps	(Gls)
2015–2016	Poiré-sur-Vie	17	(2)
2016–2017	Les Herbiers B	23	(7)
2017	Foresta Suceava	11	(1)
2018	Daco-Getica București	21	(0)
2019	Sileks	8	(0)
2019	Turris Turnu Măgurele	13	(0)
2020–2021	Dunărea Călărași	11	(0)
2021	Universitatea Cluj	7	(0)
2022	Dacia Unirea Brăila	7	(1)
2023–2024	Viitorul Târgu Jiu	28	(0)
2024–2025	Metalul Buzău	9	(0)
2025–	Riteriai	15	(1)

International career^{‡}
2017–	Togo	2	(0)
- * Club domestic league appearances and goals as of 10 November 2025 ‡ National team caps and goals as of 26 March 2024

Charles Benoit Koffi Acolatse (born 5 May 1995) is a professional footballer who plays as a midfielder for Lithuanian club Riteriai. Born in France, he plays for the Togo national team.

== Career ==
Acolatse started his career in French lower divisions. In 2017, he moved to Romania to join Foresta Suceava.

Since November 2024, Acolatse played for Liga II club Metalul Buzău.

On 20 July 2025, it was announced he had signed with Lithuanian side Riteriai. Later that day, he made his debut in A Lyga against Sūduva.

== International career ==
While playing in Romania with the Liga II team Foresta Suceava, Acolatse was called up to play for the Togo national team by coach Claude Le Roy in November 2017, making his debut in a friendly game against Mauritius.

== Career statistics ==
=== International ===
As of match played 26 March 2024

Appearances and goals by national team and year
National team	Year	Apps	Goals
Togo	2017	1	0
Togo	2024	1	0
Total		2	0
