= Alin Babei =

Romanian professional footballer

Personal information
- Date of birth: 13 December 1997 (age 28)
- Place of birth: Brașov, Romania
- Position: Midfielder

Team information
- Current team: Cetățenii Ghimbav

Youth career
- 2007–2014: FC Brașov
- 2008–2009: → Predeal (loan)
- 2010–2011: → Forex Brașov (loan)
- 2013–2014: → Corona Brașov (loan)
- 2014–2016: Precizia Săcele

Senior career*
Years	Team	Apps	(Gls)
2016–2018	Sepsi OSK	0	(0)
2016–2018	→ KSE Târgu Secuiesc (loan)	20	(14)
2018	Dunărea Călărași	1	(0)
2019	CSM Reșița	12	(1)
2020	KSE Târgu Secuiesc	6	(0)
2021–2023	Olimpic Cetate Râșnov	28	(10)
2023–	Cetățenii Ghimbav	2	(0)
- * Club domestic league appearances and goals as of 17:18, 14 January 2024 (UTC)

Alin Babei (born 13 December 1997) is a Romanian professional footballer who plays as a midfielder for Cetățenii Ghimbav. In the past Babei played for Sepsi OSK in the Liga III, after promotion of the team he was loaned at KSE Târgu Secuiesc, team with which he obtained another promotion, from Liga IV to Liga III, then being one of the most important players in the third league with 11 goals scored.

== Honours ==
Sepsi OSK

- Liga III: 2015–16

KSE Târgu Secuiesc

- Liga IV – Covasna County: 2016–17

CSM Reșița

- Liga III: 2018–19
