= Cristian Balgiu =

Romanian professional footballer

Personal information
- Full name: Cristian Marian Balgiu
- Date of birth: 3 August 1994 (age 32)
- Place of birth: Bucharest, Romania
- Height: 1.78 m (5 ft 10 in)
- Position: Midfielder

Team information
- Current team: Popești-Leordeni
- Number: 8

Youth career
- –2013: Concordia Chiajna

Senior career*
Years	Team	Apps	(Gls)
2013–2016	Concordia Chiajna	2	(1)
2014–2016	→ Afumați (loan)	34	(1)
2016	Afumați	18	(1)
2017	ASA Târgu Mureș	9	(0)
2017–2018	Academica Clinceni	18	(0)
2018	Juventus București	11	(0)
2018–2019	Concordia Chiajna	1	(0)
2018–2019	→ Turris Turnu Măgurele (loan)	22	(3)
2019–2021	SCM Gloria Buzău	41	(2)
2021–2022	Universitatea Cluj	25	(0)
2022–2023	CSA Steaua București	24	(1)
2023–2024	Argeș Pitești	4	(0)
2024	ACS Mediaș	10	(0)
2024–2025	ARO Câmpulung	11	(0)
2025–2026	Cetatea Suceava	15	(0)
2026–	Popești-Leordeni	8	(0)
- * Club domestic league appearances and goals as of 31 October 2026

Cristian Marian Balgiu (born 3 August 1994) is a Romanian professional footballer who plays as a midfielder for Liga II club Popești-Leordeni.

== Honours ==
Afumați

- Liga III: 2015–16

Turris Turnu Măgurele

- Liga III: 2018–19
