= Tiberiu Serediuc =

Romanian footballer

Personal information
- Full name: Tiberiu Andrei Serediuc
- Date of birth: 2 July 1992 (age 34)
- Place of birth: Suceava, Romania
- Height: 1.72 m (5 ft 8 in)
- Position: Right midfielder

Team information
- Current team: Lotus Băile Felix
- Number: 20

Youth career
- LPS Suceava
- 2004–2007: Cetatea Suceava
- 2007–2009: Școala de Fotbal Gheorghe Popescu

Senior career*
Years	Team	Apps	(Gls)
2009	Jiul Petroșani	3	(0)
2010–2012	Otopeni	53	(4)
2012–2017	Concordia Chiajna	151	(12)
2017–2018	Botoșani	22	(0)
2018–2019	Hermannstadt	18	(0)
2020	Turris Turnu Măgurele	8	(0)
2020–2021	Rodos	15	(0)
2021–2022	Politehnica Iași	23	(1)
2023	FC Bihor	11	(3)
2023–2024	Minaur Baia Mare	15	(1)
2025–	Lotus Băile Felix	27	(6)

International career^{‡}
	Romania U-17	4	(0)
	Romania U-19	2	(0)
2012–2013	Romania U-21	6	(0)
- * Club domestic league appearances and goals as of 16:34, 18 January 2026 (UTC) ‡ National team caps and goals as of 13 August 2013

Tiberiu Andrei Serediuc (born 2 July 1992) is a Romanian footballer who plays as a midfielder for Lotus Băile Felix.

== International career ==
Serediuc made his debut for Romania U-19 on 26 September 2008 in a game against Israel U-19. He played with the under-19 team at the 2011 UEFA European Under-19 Football Championship, which took place in Romania.
