= Cristian Ciobanu =

Romanian professional footballer

Personal information
- Date of birth: 3 July 1994 (age 32)
- Place of birth: Curtea de Argeș, Romania
- Height: 1.80 m (5 ft 11 in)
- Position: Midfielder

Youth career
- –2012: Sporting Câmpulung

Senior career*
Years	Team	Apps	(Gls)
2012–2013	Dinamo II București	9	(0)
2013–2014	Olt Slatina	9	(0)
2014–2019	Concordia Chiajna	19	(2)
2016	→ Universitatea Cluj (loan)	6	(0)
2018	→ Juventus București (loan)	16	(0)
2019–2020	Turris Turnu Măgurele	24	(7)
2020–2023	Gloria Buzău	57	(12)
2023	Oțelul Galați	2	(0)
2023–2025	CSM Focșani	33	(21)
2025–2026	ASA Târgu Mureș	8	(1)
- * Club domestic league appearances and goals as of 13 December 2025

Cristian Ciobanu (born 3 July 1994) is a Romanian professional footballer who plays as a midfielder.

== Honours ==
Concordia Chiajna

- Cupa Ligii runner-up: 2015–16

Turris Turnu Măgurele

- Liga III: 2018–19
