= Alexandru Munteanu (footballer) =

Romanian footballer

Alex Munteanu
Personal information
- Full name: Alexandru Munteanu
- Date of birth: 31 October 1987 (age 39)
- Place of birth: Mediaș, Romania
- Height: 1.81 m (5 ft 11 in)
- Position: Winger

Team information
- Current team: Gloria Buzău
- Number: 22

Youth career
- 1998–2005: Gaz Metan Mediaș

Senior career*
Years	Team	Apps	(Gls)
2006–2014	Gaz Metan Mediaș	112	(7)
2015–2017	Gaz Metan Mediaș	73	(11)
2017–2018	Poli Timișoara	35	(4)
2018–2019	Dunărea Călărași	13	(0)
2019	Petrolul Ploiești	11	(1)
2020–2021	Politehnica Timișoara	28	(0)
2021–	Gloria Buzău	22	(1)
- * Club domestic league appearances and goals as of 10:34, 22 June 2022 (UTC)

Alexandru "Alex" Munteanu (born 31 October 1987) is a Romanian footballer who plays as a midfielder for Gloria Buzău.
