= Simon Măzărache =

Romanian footballer

Personal information
- Full name: Simon Moise Măzărache
- Date of birth: 10 January 1993 (age 33)
- Place of birth: Schitu Golești, Romania
- Height: 1.82 m (6 ft 0 in)
- Position: Forward

Team information
- Current team: Zimbrii Lerești
- Number: 7

Youth career
- –2010: Sporting Pitești

Senior career*
Years	Team	Apps	(Gls)
2010–2012	Sporting Pitești	0	(0)
2012–2013	Dinamo II București	7	(0)
2012	→ Berceni (loan)	?	(?)
2013	→ Viitorul Axintele (loan)	?	(?)
2014–2015	Muscelul Câmpulung	37	(26)
2015–2018	Universitatea Craiova	53	(6)
2017	→ Juventus București (loan)	21	(3)
2018–2019	Concordia Chiajna	13	(0)
2019–2020	Mioveni	42	(10)
2020–2021	Farul Constanța	23	(4)
2021–2022	Petrolul Ploiești	39	(2)
2023–2024	ARO Câmpulung	38	(23)
2024–	Zimbrii Lerești	11	(17)
- * Club domestic league appearances and goals

Simon Moise Măzărache (born 10 January 1993) is a Romanian professional footballer who plays as a forward for Liga IV side Zimbrii Lerești. In his career, Măzărache also played for teams such as Muscelul Câmpulung, Universitatea Craiova, CS Mioveni or Farul Constanța, among others.

== Honours ==
Petrolul Ploiești

- Liga II: 2021–22
