= Stephan Drăghici =

Romanian footballer

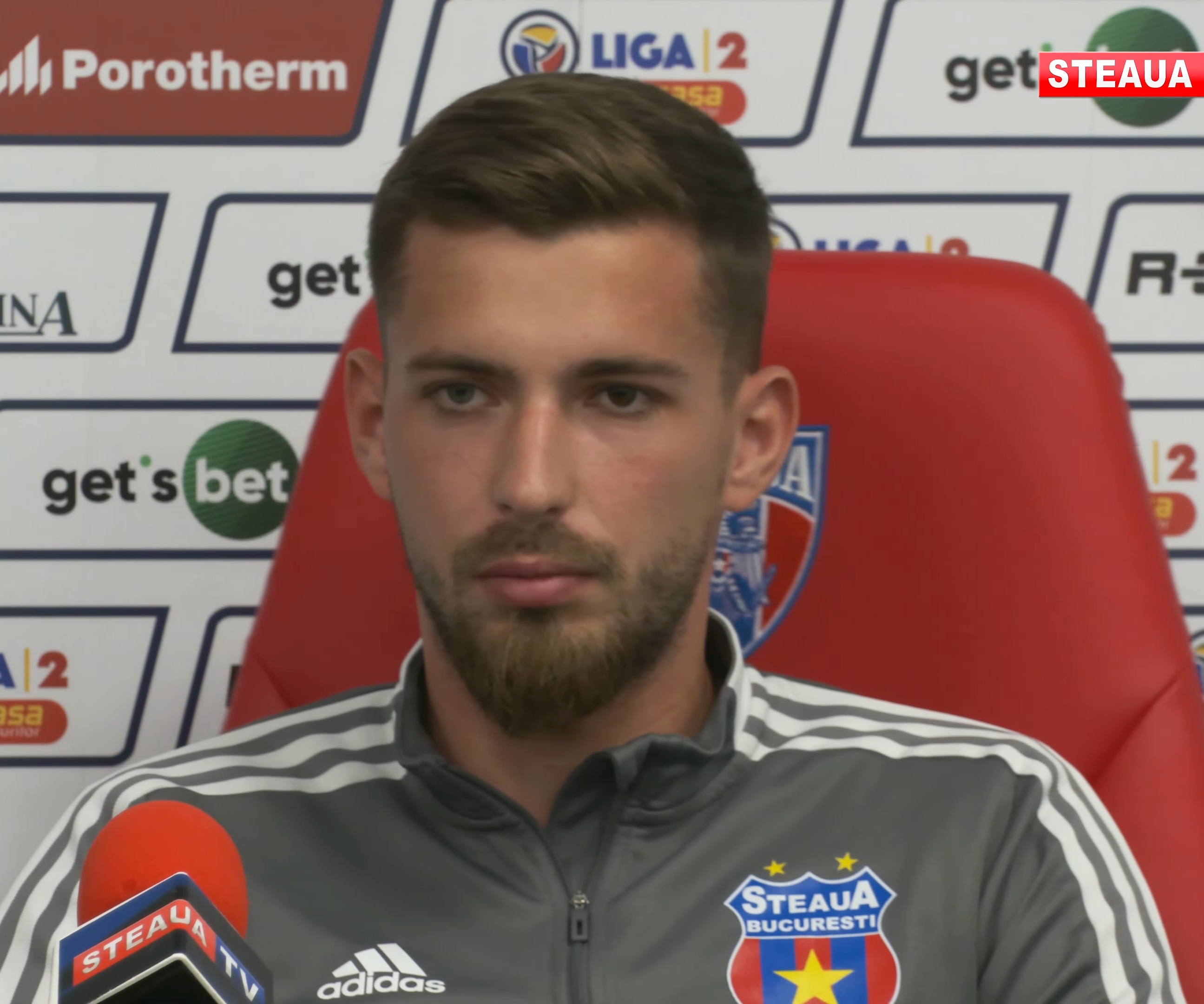
- Stephan Drăghici in 2022

Personal information
- Full name: Stephan Leonard Drăghici
- Date of birth: 30 January 1998 (age 28)
- Place of birth: Roșiorii de Vede, Romania
- Height: 1.78 m (5 ft 10 in)
- Positions: Midfielder; right-back

Team information
- Current team: Politehnica Timișoara
- Number: 7

Youth career
- Școala de Fotbal Răzvan Raț
- –2016: Ardealul Cluj

Senior career*
Years	Team	Apps	(Gls)
2016–2021	Universitatea Craiova	6	(0)
2016	→ CSM Râmnicu Vâlcea (loan)	8	(0)
2017	→ Academica Clinceni (loan)	9	(2)
2018	→ Juventus București (loan)	15	(0)
2018–2019	→ Sepsi OSK (loan)	20	(0)
2019–2020	→ Gaz Metan Mediaș (loan)	15	(0)
2020–2021	→ Argeș Pitești (loan)	26	(2)
2021–2026	CSA Steaua București	114	(7)
2026–	Politehnica Timișoara	12	(2)

International career
2016	Romania U18	1	(0)
2016	Romania U19	2	(0)
2019	Romania U21	2	(0)
- * Club domestic league appearances and goals as of 31 October 2026

Stephan Leonard Drăghici (born 30 January 1998) is a Romanian professional footballer who plays as a midfielder or a right-back for Liga II club Politehnica Timișoara.
