= Walace (footballer, born 1989) =

Brazilian footballer

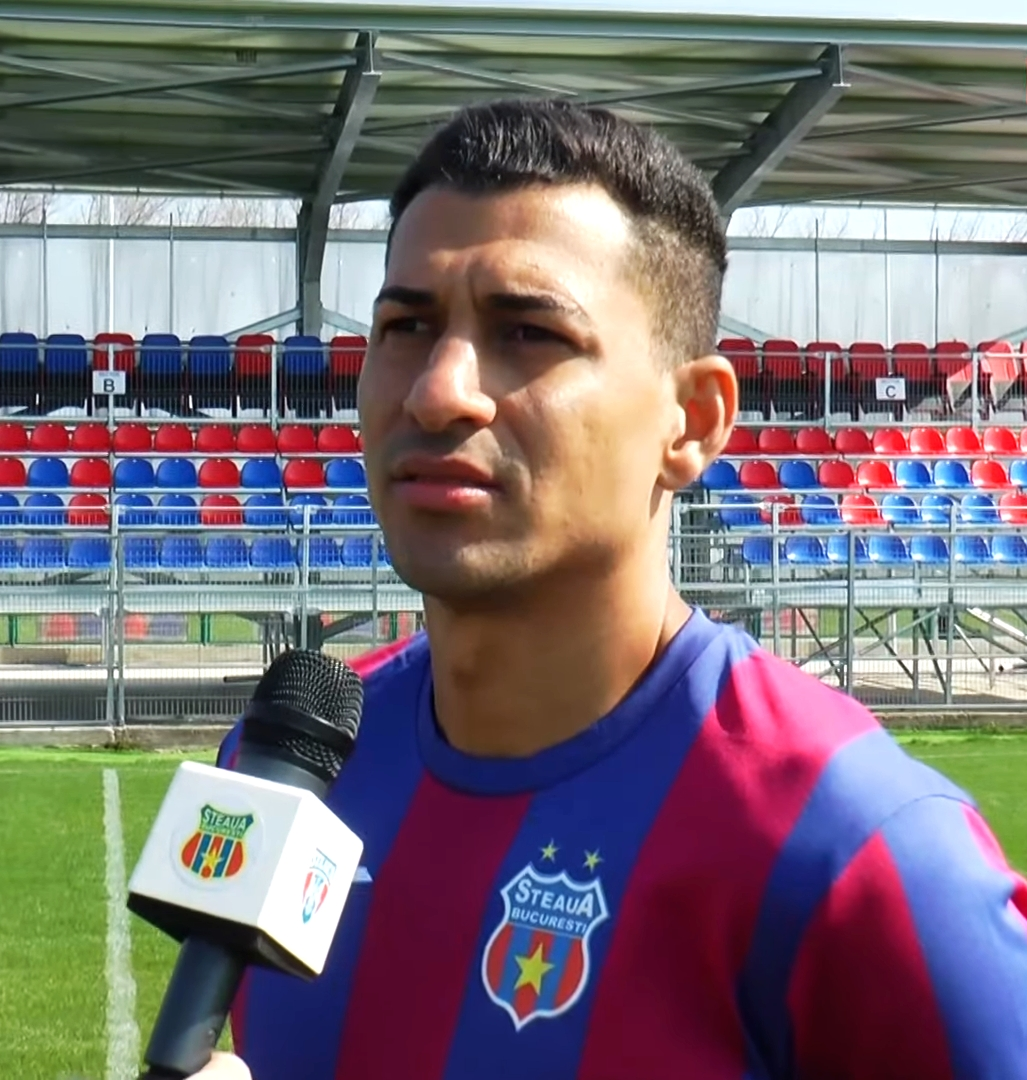
- Walace with CSA Steaua București in 2020

Personal information
- Full name: Walace Alves da Silva
- Date of birth: 20 October 1989 (age 37)
- Place of birth: Ji-Paraná, Brazil
- Height: 1.89 m (6 ft 2 in)
- Position: Centre-back

Team information
- Current team: CSA Steaua București (assistant)

Youth career
- –2007: Corinthians

Senior career*
Years	Team	Apps	(Gls)
2009–2012	Girom Albota		
2011–2012	→ Argeș Pitești (loan)	25	(3)
2012–2013	Rapid București	5	(0)
2014–2015	Olt Slatina	3	(0)
2015–2018	Juventus București	58	(2)
2018	Voluntari	6	(0)
2018	Dunărea Călărași	9	(0)
2019	Al Ittihad Alexandria	5	(0)
2019	Petrolul Ploiești	6	(0)
2020–2024	CSA Steaua București	48	(3)
2024–2025	Daco-Getica București		
Total		165	(5)

Managerial career
- 2025–: CSA Steaua București (assistant)
- * Club domestic league appearances and goals

Walace Alves da Silva (born 20 October 1989), commonly known as Walace, is a former Brazilian professional footballer who played as a centre-back, currently assistant coach at Liga II club for CSA Steaua București.

== Honours ==
Juventus București

- Liga II: 2016–17
- Liga III: 2015–16

CSA Steaua București

- Liga III: 2020–21
