= Vasile Gheorghe =

Romanian footballer

Personal information
- Date of birth: 5 September 1985 (age 41)
- Place of birth: Brăila, Romania
- Height: 1.77 m (5 ft 10 in)
- Position: Midfielder

Team information
- Current team: Concordia Chiajna (fitness coach)

Youth career
- 1995–2005: Petrolul Brăila
- 2005–2006: Unirea Urziceni

Senior career*
Years	Team	Apps	(Gls)
2006–2010	Astra Ploiești	58	(0)
2006–2008	Astra II Ploiești	61	(6)
2010–2011	Universitatea Cluj	22	(0)
2011–2012	Mioveni	15	(1)
2012–2013	Universitatea Cluj	18	(0)
2014	Oțelul Galați	5	(0)
2014–2015	Olt Slatina	3	(0)
2015–2017	Politehnica Iași	71	(9)
2017–2018	Concordia Chiajna	7	(0)
2018	→ Juventus București (loan)	10	(1)
2018–2019	Argeș Pitești	18	(2)
2019–2021	Slatina	34	(10)
2021	Dunărea Călărași	5	(0)
Total		327	(29)

Managerial career
- 2022: Chindia Târgoviște (fitness coach)
- 2022–2023: Chindia Târgoviște (fitness coach)
- 2023: Universitatea Cluj (fitness coach)
- 2023–2026: Botoșani (fitness coach)
- 2026–: Concordia Chiajna (fitness coach)
- * Club domestic league appearances and goals

Vasile Gheorghe (born 9 May 1985) is a Romanian former professional footballer who played as a midfielder, currently fitness coach at Liga II club Concordia Chiajna.

== Honours ==
CSM Slatina

- Liga III: 2019–20
