= Mihai Stancu =

Romanian footballer

Personal information
- Full name: Mihai Iulian Stancu
- Date of birth: 29 January 1996 (age 30)
- Place of birth: Pitești, Romania
- Height: 1.82 m (6 ft 0 in)
- Position: Defensive midfielder

Team information
- Current team: Mediaș
- Number: 8

Youth career
- Argeș Pitești

Senior career*
Years	Team	Apps	(Gls)
2012–2014	Argeș Pitești	3	(0)
2014	Fortuna Poiana Câmpina	6	(1)
2015	SCM Pitești		
2015–2019	Gaz Metan Mediaș	34	(0)
2017–2018	→ Hermannstadt (loan)	13	(0)
2019	Daco-Getica București	23	(2)
2020–2021	Focșani	15	(1)
2021–2022	Pandurii Târgu Jiu	12	(1)
2022–2023	Alexandria	38	(3)
2024	Focșani	8	(2)
2024–	Mediaș	0	(0)
- * Club domestic league appearances and goals as of 10:13, 8 November 2024 (UTC)

Mihai Iulian Stancu (born 29 January 1996) is a Romanian professional footballer who plays as a defender or defensive midfielder for ACS Mediaș. In his career, Stancu also played for teams such as: FC Argeș Pitești, Fortuna Poiana Câmpina, Gaz Metan Mediaș and FC Hermannstadt.

== Honours ==
Gaz Metan Mediaș

- Liga II: 2015–16

Hermannstadt

- Cupa României: Runner-up 2017–18
