= Mircea Leasă =

Romanian footballer

Personal information
- Full name: Mircea Valentin Leasă
- Date of birth: 22 February 1999 (age 27)
- Place of birth: Bucharest, Romania
- Height: 1.76 m (5 ft 9 in)
- Position: Right back

Youth career
- Dinamo București
- –2016: Voluntari

Senior career*
Years	Team	Apps	(Gls)
2015–2020	Voluntari	13	(0)
2018	→ Viitorul Târgu Jiu (loan)	7	(0)
2020–2022	Rapid București	1	(0)
- * Club domestic league appearances and goals as of 08:41, 7 April 2022 (UTC)

Mircea Valentin Leasă (born 22 February 1999) is a Romanian professional footballer who plays as a defender.

== Honours ==
FC Voluntari

- Liga II: 2014–15
- Romanian Cup: 2016–17
- Romanian Supercup: 2017
