= FC Gloria Buzău =

Association football club in Buzău

Gloria Buzău
- Full name: Asociația Sportivă Fotbal Club Buzău
- Nicknames: Roș-albaștrii (The Red and Blues); Formația din Crâng (The Squad from Crâng)
- Short name: Gloria
- Founded: 16 June 1973; 53 years ago as CSM Buzău; 25 August 2016; 9 years ago as FC Buzău
- Dissolved: 2025
- Ground: Municipal
- Capacity: 12,321
- 2024–25: Liga I, 16th of 16 (relegated)

Asociația Sportivă Fotbal Club Buzău (Romanian pronunciation: [ˈɡlori.a buˈzəw]), commonly known as Gloria Buzău or simply as Buzău, was a Romanian professional football club based in the city of Buzău, Buzău County.

The club was originally founded on 16 June 1973, and made its first top-flight appearance in the 1978–79 campaign. It achieved its best result in the competition during the 1984–85 season, finishing fifth in the league table. Following the club's dissolution in 2016, Gloria Buzău returned to the Liga I in 2024.

Known as "The Squad from Crâng", the team plays its home matches at the Municipal Stadium in Buzău, which has a capacity of 12,321 seats.

== History ==
=== Establishment ===
The club was established on 16 June 1973 by the Buzău County authorities as part of CSM Buzău (Clubul Sportiv Municipal), the city's multi-sport organisation.

Gloria absorbed the former Buzău club Metalul Buzău, whose place in Divizia C it also took. With several former Metalul players, together with other local footballers, particularly from another Buzău side, Șoimii, the newly formed team finished first in its Divizia C series during its inaugural season. Gloria subsequently won the promotion play-off tournament and earned promotion to Divizia B in its first year of existence.

=== 1970s and 1980s ===
After several attempts to challenge for first place in Series I of Divizia B, Gloria finally won the series at the end of the 1977–78 season, only five years after its establishment, and earned promotion to Divizia A for the first time in the history of a club from Buzău.

During its first season in the top flight, Gloria recorded one of the most memorable results in its history, a 4–1 home victory over Steaua București. The club managed to avoid relegation, notably defeating UTA Arad late in the campaign, a result that contributed to the Arad club's relegation. Gloria itself was relegated the following season.

After four seasons outside the top flight, Gloria returned to Divizia A, where it remained for another three seasons. The 1984–85 season became the most successful league campaign in the club's history, with Gloria finishing 5th. The result also qualified the club for the Balkans Cup, where it reached the semi-finals before being eliminated by Greek side Panionios.

=== Two decades in the lower leagues ===
What followed was approximately two decades spent predominantly in the lower divisions, including two seasons in Divizia C, in 2000–01 and 2001–02. After returning to Divizia B, former Gloria player Viorel Ion became player-coach and guided the club to the promotion play-offs for Liga I, where Buzău was defeated by FC Politehnica AEK Timișoara.

Meanwhile, the club encountered severe financial difficulties and came close to bankruptcy. The problems continued until the 2006–07 season, when investor Aurel Brebeanu took over the club from former president Dan Tulpan and managed to stabilise its finances. The same campaign brought a major sporting achievement, as Gloria earned promotion to Liga I after a twenty-year absence.

In 2007, businessman Constantin Bucur acquired 52% of the shares in the newly promoted club, becoming its majority shareholder.

=== Return to the first division (2007–2009) ===
Following promotion at the end of the 2006–07 season, Gloria entered Liga I under coach Viorel Ion. Majority shareholder Constantin Bucur dismissed Ion after only a few matches of the 2007–08 season and replaced him with Ștefan Stoica. The team spent much of the campaign fighting relegation but eventually finished in the final position that ensured survival in the top flight.

The following season proved considerably more difficult. Gloria finished last in the 2008–09 campaign and was relegated to Liga II.

=== Return to the lower leagues ===
Following relegation, Bucur withdrew his support and, amid continuing financial problems, Gloria lost most of its senior squad during the summer of 2009. Its first season back in Liga II was difficult. The club began the championship with an eight-point deduction after failing to reach the minimum points requirement in the previous top-flight season, and also lost its opening match 0–3 by a federal decision because of unpaid debts to former players.

A squad was assembled only a few weeks before the beginning of the championship. Nicolae Anton, previously responsible for the reserve team in Liga IV and the youth sector, was appointed head coach. Despite the difficulties, Gloria recorded six victories between rounds 2 and 8, including four consecutive wins between rounds 2 and 5, and ultimately avoided relegation by finishing 14th.

After finishing 10th the following season, further financial difficulties forced the club to rely increasingly on youth players, and Gloria was eventually relegated to Liga III.

The 2012–13 season saw Gloria challenge for promotion back to Liga II. Its principal rival, Viitorul Axintele, initially appeared to have the advantage. Ștefan Stoica, who had returned as head coach, later stepped down for family reasons and was replaced by Marian Roșu.

Although Gloria lost the direct meeting with Viitorul during the spring of 2013 and appeared to have missed promotion, a subsequent Romanian Football Federation investigation established that Viitorul had failed to maintain the three county-level youth teams required by Liga III regulations. The club was given a nine-point deduction, allowing Gloria to finish first and earn promotion to Liga II.

On 26 May 2016, the Romanian Football Federation sanctioned 14 Gloria players and three officials for involvement in match-fixing and betting-related offences connected with ten Liga II matches played between September 2014 and May 2015. The sanctions amounted to a combined 174 months of suspensions.

At the end of the 2015–16 season, Gloria was scheduled to face Olimpia Satu Mare in a relegation play-off. However, the club was unable to field a team after the suspensions came into effect and did not contest the tie. Together with its continuing financial problems, these developments led to the bankruptcy and disappearance of the old FC Gloria Buzău structure.

=== Refounding and rise through the leagues (2016–2022) ===
Following the bankruptcy of FC Gloria Buzău, businessman Ionel Turturică established a new club, FC Buzău, which was entered in Liga V – Buzău County. The squad included several players who had previously represented FC Gloria Buzău.

In its first season, the new club won promotion to Liga IV, collecting 63 points and finishing seven points ahead of the runners-up.

In the summer of 2017, FC Buzău was integrated into the newly created municipal multi-sport organisation and renamed SCM Gloria Buzău. At the end of the 2017–18 season, the club earned a second consecutive promotion, this time to Liga III.

In the 2018–19 Liga III season, SCM Gloria secured its third consecutive promotion by winning Series I. The campaign included matches against clubs such as Oțelul Galați, Foresta Suceava, Bucovina Rădăuți and Ceahlăul Piatra Neamț. The Red and Blues remained unbeaten until the final round and returned to Liga II.

After two seasons in Liga II that ended with mid-table finishes, SCM Gloria Buzău underwent another organisational change. Because SCM Gloria was a public entity and therefore unable to satisfy the ownership requirements for a potential Liga I licence, the football activity was transferred to a public-private association competing under the name FC Buzău.

In the summer of 2022, the club acquired the rights to the historic Gloria Buzău identity, including its name, brand and sporting record, and was renamed FC Gloria Buzău.

=== Return to Liga I (2022–2025) ===
After returning to the Gloria identity, the club continued to challenge for promotion from Liga II. During the 2023–24 season, Gloria qualified for the promotion play-off and remained in contention for a top-flight place throughout the spring.

On 9 May 2024, a 3–0 home victory over Unirea Slobozia mathematically secured promotion to Romania's top flight. Gloria ultimately finished 4th in the Liga II play-off with 51 points. Because second-placed Corvinul Hunedoara and third-placed CSC Șelimbăr were not eligible for promotion, Gloria obtained the second direct promotion place and returned to the first division after fifteen years.

The 2024–25 season proved considerably more difficult. Gloria spent most of the campaign near the bottom of the standings and entered the relegation play-out in last place. Although the club recorded away victories over Sepsi OSK and Hermannstadt during the play-out, its position could not be recovered. Gloria finished last in the play-out and was directly relegated to Liga II after only one season back in the top flight.

=== Financial collapse and dissolution (2025) ===
The relegation was followed by a severe financial crisis. At the end of May 2025, both the Municipality of Buzău and the Buzău County Council, the club's principal public financial supporters, announced that they would no longer provide funding for the senior team. Representatives of the County Council were instructed to withdraw from the association that operated the club, placing Gloria's continued existence in serious doubt.

The club's accumulated debts made participation in the 2025–26 Liga II impossible. On 29 July 2025, the leadership of the Buzău County Council publicly announced that FC Buzău, which had competed under the Gloria Buzău name, would be dissolved and that its assets were expected to become subject to enforcement proceedings.

Gloria consequently did not register for the 2025–26 Liga II season and also did not enter Liga III. By the autumn of 2025, the senior football team had effectively ceased to exist. Reports in October stated that the operating association was neither formally in insolvency nor bankruptcy at that stage, despite having discontinued all competitive activity, while numerous former players and staff pursued unpaid claims against the club.

The dissolution brought an end to the second Gloria Buzău project, founded in 2016 and successively known as FC Buzău, SCM Gloria Buzău, FC Buzău and FC Gloria Buzău. Its final competitive season was 2024–25, when the club returned to the Romanian top flight for the first time in fifteen years but was relegated after a single campaign.

== Ground ==
The club plays its home matches on Municipal Stadium from Buzău, with a capacity of 12,321 seats. Municipal Stadium was opened in 1942, is located in the Crâng park, hence the nickname Crâng (Grove). The arena was renovated several times since its opening ceremony (1971–1976, 2005–2007, 2008). The last renovations works were made in the summer of 2018 when the pitch of the stadium was changed.

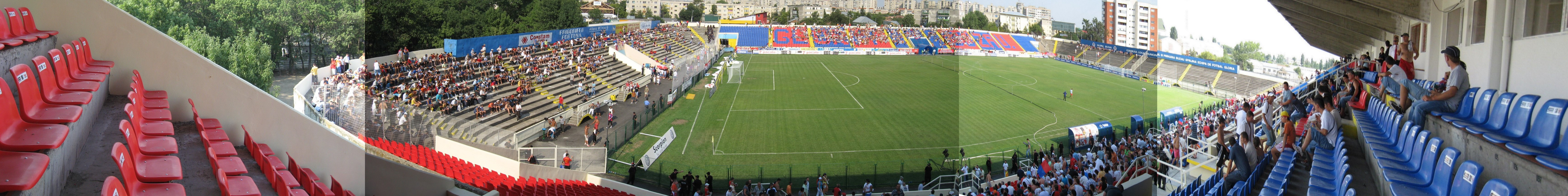
Municipal Stadium in 2007.

== Support ==
Gloria Buzău has many supporters in Buzău and especially in Buzău County. The ultras group of Gloria it is known as "Peluza Crâng".

== Honours ==
=== Leagues ===
- Divizia A / Liga I
  - Best finish 5th: 1984–85
- Divizia B / Liga II
  - Winners (2): 1977–78, 1983–84
  - Runners-up (7): 1973–74, 1976–77, 1982–83, 1989–90, 1990–91, 2002–03, 2006–07
- Divizia C / Liga III
  - Winners (3): 1971–72, 2001–02, 2012–13, 2018–19
  - Runners-up (1): 2000–01
- Liga IV – Buzău County
  - Winners (1): 2017–18
- Liga V – Buzău County
  - Winners (1): 2016–17

=== Cups ===
- Cupa României
  - Semi-finalist: 2007–08

== Notable former players ==
The footballers enlisted below have had international cap(s) for their respective countries at junior and/or senior level and/or significant caps for Gloria Buzău.

Romania

- (Romania) Valentin Alexandru
- (Romania) Iulian Apostol
- (Romania) Alexandru Badea
- (Romania) Cristian Balgiu
- (Romania) Eric Bicfalvi
- (Romania) Alexandru Bourceanu
- (Romania) Constantin Budescu
- (Romania) Romeo Bunică
- (Romania) Dorin Burlacu
- (Romania) Adi Chică-Roșă
- (Romania) Cristian Ciobanu
- (Romania) Alexandru Dandea
- (Romania) Iulian Dăniță
- (Romania) Claudiu Dumitrescu
- (Romania) Dudu Georgescu
- (Romania) Dorin Goian
- (Romania) Gheorghe Grozea
- (Romania) Viorel Ion
- (Romania) Claudiu Ionescu
- (Romania) Valentin Ioviță
- (Romania) József Lőrincz
- (Romania) Dumitru Marcu
- (Romania) Gabriel Marcu
- (Romania) Mihai Mincă
- (Romania) Alexandru Munteanu
- (Romania) Leonida Nedelcu
- (Romania) Alexandru Nicolae
- (Romania) Clement Pălimaru
- (Romania) Sorin Pană
- (Romania) Ciprian Petre
- (Romania) Adrian Popa
- (Romania) Dorinel Popa
- (Romania) Nini Popescu
- (Romania) Constantin Secăreanu
- (Romania) Constantin Stan
- (Romania) Ilie Stan
- (Romania) Relu Stoian
- (Romania) Pompiliu Stoica
- (Romania) Mihai Stoichiță
- (Romania) Alexandru Tudose
- (Romania) Daniel Vîrtej
- (Romania) Cătălin Vlaicu
- (Romania) Gabriel Zahiu

Argentina

- (Argentina) Pablo Gaitán

Cameroon

- (Cameroon) James Léa Siliki

DR Congo

- (Democratic Republic of the Congo) Mike Cestor

Netherlands

- (Netherlands) Kevin Brobbey

Nigeria

- (Nigeria) Dino Eze

== Notable former managers ==
- (Romania) Petre Dragomir (1971–1972)
- (Romania) Ion Ionescu (1978–1979)
- (Romania) Ilie Oană (1980)
- (Romania) Nicolae Lupescu (1982–1984)
- (Romania) Gheorghe Constantin (1984–1986)
- (Romania) Constantin Moldoveanu (1986–1987)
- (Romania) Viorel Ion (2001–2003)
- (Romania) Ștefan Stoica (2006–2007)
- (Romania) Viorel Ion (2007–2008)
- (Romania) Mario Marinică (2008–2009) (caretaker)
- (Romania) Mihai Ciobanu (2010–2012)
- (Romania) Marian Roșu (2013)
- (Romania) Viorel Ion (2013–2016)
- (Romania) Ilie Stan (2019–2021)
- (Romania) Cristian Pustai (2021–2022)
- (Romania) Adrian Mihalcea (2022–2023)
- (Romania) Andrei Prepeliță (2023–2024)
- (Romania) Eugen Neagoe (2024–2025)
- (Romania) Ilie Stan (2025)

== League history ==
Season	Tier	Division	Place	Cupa României
2024–25	1	Liga I	16th (R)	Play-off round
2023–24	2	Liga II	4th (P)	Group Stage
2022–23	2	Liga II	5th	Group Stage
2021–22	2	Liga II	8th	Quarter-finals
2020–21	2	Liga II	12th	Round of 32
2019–20	2	Liga II	8th	Third Round
2018–19	3	Liga III	1st (C, P)	
2017–18	4	Liga IV	1st (C, P)	
2016–17	5	Liga V	1st (C, P)	
2015–16	2	Liga II (Seria I)	9th (R)	
2014–15	2	Liga II (Seria I)	3rd	
2013–14	2	Liga II (Seria I)	8th	Round of 32
2012–13	3	Liga III (Seria II)	1st (C, P)	
2011–12	2	Liga II (Seria I)	15th (R)	
2010–11	2	Liga II (Seria I)	10th	
2009–10	2	Liga II (Seria I)	14th	
2008–09	1	Liga I	18th (R)	Round of 32
2007–08	1	Liga I	14th	Semi-finals

Season	Tier	Division	Place	Cupa României
2006–07	2	Liga II (Seria I)	2nd (P)	Round of 32
2005–06	2	Divizia B (Seria I)	9th	Round of 32
2004–05	2	Divizia B (Seria I)	9th	
2003–04	2	Divizia B (Seria I)	13th	
2002–03	2	Divizia B (Seria I)	2nd	
2001–02	3	Divizia C (Seria II)	1st (C, P)	Round of 32
2000–01	3	Divizia C (Seria II)	2nd	
1999–00	2	Divizia B (Seria I)	18th (R)	
1998–99	2	Divizia B (Seria I)	10th	
1997–98	2	Divizia B (Seria I)	12th	Round of 16
1996–97	2	Divizia B (Seria I)	6th	
1995–96	2	Divizia B (Seria I)	4th	
1994–95	2	Divizia B (Seria I)	8th	
1993–94	2	Divizia B (Seria I)	11th	
1992–93	2	Divizia B (Seria I)	7th	Round of 32
1991–92	2	Divizia B (Seria I)	10th	
1990–91	2	Divizia B (Seria I)	2nd	
1989–90	2	Divizia B (Seria I)	2nd	
