= List of Romanian football transfers summer 2017 =

This is a list of Romanian football transfers for the 2017–18 summer transfer window. Only moves featuring 2017–18 Liga I and 2017–18 Liga II are listed.

== Liga I ==
=== ACS Poli Timișoara ===
In:

No.	Pos.	Nation	Player
—	DF	Romania	Ștefănel Covalschi (from Afumați)
—	DF	Romania	Valentin Crețu (from Gaz Metan Mediaș)
—	DF	Romania	Cristian Melinte (from Concordia Chiajna)
—	DF	Romania	Alexandru Țigănașu (from CSM Politehnica Iași)
—	MF	Romania	Alexandru Ciucur (from CSM Politehnica Iași)
—	MF	Romania	Alexandru Munteanu (from Gaz Metan Mediaș)
—	MF	Romania	Gabriel Vașvari (from Botoșani)
—	MF	Romania	Vlad Mihalcea (on loan from Steaua București)
—	MF	Croatia	Ivan Ćurjurić (from (Cyprus) Nea Salamina)
—	FW	Brazil	Miguel Bianconi (from (Brazil) Mogi Mirim)
—	FW	Romania	Cristian Bud (from CFR Cluj)

Out:

No.	Pos.	Nation	Player
—	GK	Romania	Mario Contra (on loan to ACS Ghiroda)
—	GK	Romania	David Filip (on loan to CSM Lugoj)
—	GK	Romania	Sebastian Ureche (on loan to ACS Ghiroda)
—	DF	Romania	Denis Ciobanu (on loan to ACS Ghiroda, previously on loan to Becicherecu Mic)
—	DF	Romania	Ștefănel Covalschi (to Flacăra Horezu)
—	DF	Romania	Daniel Filip (on loan to CSM Lugoj)
—	DF	Romania	Harald Fridrich (on loan to CSM Lugoj)
—	DF	Romania	Radu Motreanu (on loan to ASU Politehnica Timișoara)
—	DF	Romania	Ionuț Murariu (on loan to ACS Ghiroda)
—	DF	Romania	George Neagu (to Free agent)
—	DF	Croatia	Leopold Novak (to (Bosnia and Herzegovina) Vitez)
—	DF	Romania	Cristian Scutaru (to UTA Arad)
—	DF	Romania	Ciprian Sturz (on loan to Timişul Şag)
—	DF	Romania	Miodrag Todorov (to ACS Dumbrăvița, previously on loan)
—	MF	Romania	Cristian Bărbuț (to CS U Craiova)
—	MF	Romania	Darius Buia (on loan to Gloria LT Cermei)
—	MF	Romania	Raul Cochințu (on loan to ACS Ghiroda)
—	MF	Romania	Eduard Codrean (on loan to Ripensia Timișoara)
—	MF	Romania	Alexandru Dincă (on loan to ACS Ghiroda)
—	MF	Romania	Alin Ignea (to ASU Politehnica Timișoara)
—	MF	Romania	Mădălin Livan (to Național Sebiș, previously on loan at CSM Lugoj)
—	MF	Romania	Vlad Mihalcea (loan return to Steaua București, later on loan to Academica Clinceni)
—	MF	Romania	Narcis Popan (on loan to CSM Lugoj)
—	MF	Romania	Adrian Poparadu (to ASU Politehnica Timișoara)
—	MF	Romania	David Pop (on loan to ACS Ghiroda)
—	MF	Romania	Sebastian Velcotă (on loan to CSM Școlar Reșița)
—	FW	Romania	Cristian Bud (to Concordia Chiajna)
—	FW	Romania	Denis Golda (on loan to Ripensia Timișoara)
—	FW	Croatia	Josip Fuček (to (Austria) Kapfenberger SV)
—	FW	Romania	Alexandru Popovici (to (Azerbaijan) Səbail)
—	FW	Romania	Andrei Sîntean (to (Czech Republic) Slavia Prague)
—	FW	Romania	Damir Totić (on loan to ACS Ghiroda)

=== Astra Giurgiu ===
In:

No.	Pos.	Nation	Player
—	MF	Romania	Robert Boboc (loan return from Mioveni)
—	GK	Romania	David Lazar (from (Denmark) Vejle Boldklub)
—	DF	Romania	Florin Bejan (from (Poland) Cracovia, previously on loan at Concordia Chiajna)
—	DF	Brazil	Erico (from Pandurii Târgu Jiu)
—	DF	Poland	Piotr Polczak (from (Poland) Cracovia)
—	DF	Montenegro	Risto Radunović (from (Montenegro) Budućnost Podgorica)
—	MF	Romania	Ionuț Biceanu (from Mioveni)
—	MF	Croatia	Filip Mrzljak (from Free agent)
—	MF	Brazil	Marquinhos (from (Brazil) Toledo)
—	MF	Croatia	Mateo Poljak (from (Australia) Newcastle Jets)
—	MF	Romania	Robert Vâlceanu (from Steaua București, previously on loan at UTA Arad)
—	MF	Japan	Takayuki Seto (from (Turkey) Osmanlıspor, previously on loan)
—	FW	Cameroon	Anatole Abang (on loan from (United States) New York Red Bulls, previously on loan at (Finland) SJK Seinäjoki)
—	FW	Romania	Bogdan Chipirliu (from Juventus București)
—	FW	France	Anthony Le Tallec (from (Greece) Atromitos)
—	FW	Togo	Serge Nyuiadzi (on loan from (Lithuania) Žalgiris Vilnius)

Out:

No.	Pos.	Nation	Player
—	GK	Romania	Silviu Lung Jr. (to (Turkey) Kayserispor)
—	DF	Portugal	Geraldo Alves (to Retired)
—	DF	Portugal	Ricardo Alves (to (Portugal) Leixões)
—	DF	Romania	Radu Crișan (on loan to Hermannstadt)
—	DF	Brazil	Fabrício (to (Israel) Ashdod, later signed by (Cyprus) Omonia)
—	DF	Brazil	Júnior Morais (to Steaua București)
—	DF	Romania	Cristian Oroş (to Sepsi Sfântu Gheorghe)
—	DF	Romania	Andrei Roman (on loan to Metaloglobus București)
—	DF	Romania	Cristian Săpunaru (to (Turkey) Kayserispor)
—	MF	Romania	Robert Boboc (on loan to Hermannstadt)
—	MF	France	Damien Boudjemaa (to Free agent)
—	MF	Romania	Daniel Florea (to UTA Arad)
—	MF	Romania	Florin Lovin (to Retired)
—	MF	Senegal	Boubacar Mansaly (to (Turkey) BB Erzurumspor)
—	MF	Romania	Mădălin Răileanu (on loan to Metaloglobus București)
—	MF	Portugal	Filipe Teixeira (to Steaua București)
—	MF	Romania	Andrei Pițian (on loan to (Cyprus) Apollon Limassol)
—	MF	Croatia	Mateo Poljak (to Free agent)
—	MF	Romania	Viorel Nicoară (to Free agent)
—	FW	Romania	Constantin Budescu (to Steaua București)
—	FW	Romania	Sergiu Buș (to (Bulgaria) Levski Sofia)
—	FW	Romania	Daniel Niculae (to Rapid București)

=== Botoșani ===
In:

No.	Pos.	Nation	Player
—	MF	Romania	Bogdan Varodi (loan return from Metalurgistul Cugir)
—	GK	Romania	Eduard Pap (from Târgu Mureș)
—	DF	Romania	Andrei Dumitraș (from Viitorul Constanța)
—	MF	Romania	Tiberiu Serediuc (from Concordia Chiajna)
—	MF	Romania	Marian Târșa (from CSM Politehnica Iași)
—	MF	Argentina	Jonathan Rodriguez (from (Argentina) Agropecuario)
—	MF	Romania	Sebastian Chitoșcă (from Steaua București, previously on loan at Brașov)
—	MF	Romania	Claudiu Juncănaru (loan return from Farul Constanța)
—	MF	Romania	Răzvan Oaidă (from (Italy) Brescia)
—	FW	Argentina	Esteban Ciaccheri (on loan from (Chile) Rangers de Talca)
—	FW	Romania	Daniel Popa (on loan from Dinamo București)

Out:

No.	Pos.	Nation	Player
—	GK	Romania	Călin Albuț (to Universitatea Cluj)
—	GK	Romania	Raul Avram (on loan to Știința Miroslava)
—	DF	Romania	Andrei Chindriș (on loan to Știința Miroslava, previously on loan at Academica Clinceni)
—	DF	Romania	Andrei Patache (to Concordia Chiajna)
—	MF	Romania	Alin Cârstocea (to UTA Arad)
—	MF	Romania	Alexandru Corban (on loan to Știința Miroslava)
—	MF	Brazil	Endrick (to Free agent)
—	MF	Romania	Răzvan Greu (to Universitatea Cluj, previously on loan at Sepsi Sfântu Gheorghe)
—	MF	Romania	Claudiu Juncănaru (on loan to Farul Constanța)
—	MF	Romania	Sergiu Popovici (to Gaz Metan Mediaș)
—	MF	Romania	Gabriel Vașvari (to ACS Poli Timișoara)
—	MF	Romania	Cătălin Golofca (to Steaua București)
—	MF	Romania	Bogdan Varodi (to Sănătatea Cluj)
—	FW	Romania	Andrei Herghelegiu (to Luceafărul Oradea)

=== CFR Cluj ===
In:

No.	Pos.	Nation	Player
—	GK	Lithuania	Giedrius Arlauskis (from (England) Watford)
—	GK	Croatia	Tomislav Duka (from (Croatia) RNK Split)
—	GK	Romania	Adrian Rus (from Universitatea Cluj)
—	DF	Montenegro	Saša Balić (from (Bosnia and Herzegovina) Sarajevo)
—	DF	Ivory Coast	Kévin Boli (from Viitorul Constanța)
—	DF	Romania	Srdjan Luchin (from (Bulgaria) Levski Sofia)
—	DF	Romania	Cristian Manea (on loan from (Cyprus) Apollon Limassol, previously on loan at (Belgium) Royal Excel Mouscron)
—	DF	Brazil	Paulo Vinícius (from (Cyprus) Apollon Limassol)
—	DF	Romania	Alexandru Vlad (from (Ukraine) Dnipro Dnipropetrovsk)
—	MF	Argentina	Emmanuel Culio (from (Spain) Mallorca)
—	MF	Croatia	Damjan Đoković (from (Croatia) Rijeka)
—	MF	Romania	Yasin Hamed (from Pandurii Târgu Jiu)
—	MF	Romania	Ovidiu Hoban (from (Israel) Hapoel Be'er Sheva)
—	MF	Portugal	Thierry Moutinho (from (Spain) Mallorca)
—	MF	Romania	Dan Nistor (from Dinamo București)
—	MF	Spain	Pelayo (from (Spain) Elche)
—	FW	Senegal	Ibrahima Baldé (from (France) Reims)
—	FW	DR Congo	Jeremy Bokila (on loan from (Turkey) Akhisar Belediyespor)
—	FW	Romania	Marius Coman (from Academica Clinceni)
—	FW	Spain	Urko Vera (from (Spain) Mirandés)

Out:

No.	Pos.	Nation	Player
—	MF	Croatia	Tomislav Gomelt (loan return to (Italy) Bari, later signed by (Croatia) Rijeka)
—	GK	Romania	Alexandru Marc (to Retired)
—	GK	Romania	Mihai Mincă (to Șirineasa)
—	GK	Romania	Horațiu Moldovan (loan extension Hermannstadt)
—	DF	Romania	Ionuț Larie (to Steaua București)
—	DF	Portugal	Tiago Lopes (to (Turkey) Kayserispor)
—	DF	Romania	Andrei Tânc (to Luceafărul Oradea)
—	DF	Montenegro	Saša Balić (to (Poland) Zagłębie Lubin)
—	DF	Romania	Răzvan Horj (to Viitorul Constanța)
—	MF	Romania	Liviu Antal (to (Lithuania) Žalgiris Vilnius)
—	MF	Spain	Juan Carlos (to (Spain) Tenerife)
—	MF	Portugal	Filipe Nascimento (to Dinamo București)
—	MF	Romania	Alexandru Neagu (to Târgu Mureș)
—	MF	Romania	Rareș Pintea (on loan to Național Sebiș, previously on loan at Unirea Jucu)
—	MF	Romania	Cosmin Sârbu (on loan to Târgu Mureș)
—	MF	Croatia	Tomislav Šorša (to (Croatia) Osijek)
—	MF	Romania	Szilard Vereș (on loan to Național Sebiș, previously on loan at (Hungary) Gyirmót)
—	MF	Spain	Pelayo (to (Spain) Albacete)
—	FW	DR Congo	Jeremy Bokila (loan return to (Turkey) Akhisar Belediyespor, later on loan to Dinamo București)
—	FW	Romania	Cristian Bud (to ACS Poli Timișoara)
—	FW	Romania	Dan Roman (to UTA Arad)
—	FW	Croatia	Dino Špehar (on loan to Concordia Chiajna)

=== Concordia Chiajna ===
In:

No.	Pos.	Nation	Player
—	GK	Italy	Alessandro Caparco (from CSM Politehnica Iași)
—	DF	Romania	Bogdan Bucurică (from CSU Craiova)
—	DF	Central African Republic	Manassé Enza-Yamissi (from (France) Orléans)
—	DF	Romania	Andrei Marc (from (Turkey) Şanlıurfaspor)
—	DF	Romania	Andrei Patache (from Botoșani)
—	DF	Austria	Toni Tipurić (from (Croatia) Cibalia)
—	DF	Croatia	Josip Zeba (from (Slovenia) Aluminij)
—	MF	Croatia	Stjepan Babić (from (Slovenia) Rudar Velenje)
—	MF	Romania	Claudiu Bumba (from Dinamo București)
—	MF	Romania	Vasile Gheorghe (from CSM Politehnica Iași)
—	MF	Romania	Dan Bucșa (from Juventus București)
—	FW	Romania	Paul Batin (from Pandurii Târgu Jiu)
—	FW	Netherlands	Romario Kortzorg (from Free agent)
—	FW	Croatia	Dino Špehar (on loan from CFR Cluj)
—	FW	Jordan	Tha'er Bawab (on loan from Dinamo București)
—	FW	Romania	Cristian Bud (from Poli Timișoara)

Out:

No.	Pos.	Nation	Player
—	DF	Romania	Florin Bejan (loan return to (Poland) Cracovia, later signed by Astra Giurgiu)
—	DF	Romania	Dan Popescu (loan return to Steaua București)
—	GK	Romania	Virgil Drăghia (to Juventus București)
—	GK	Romania	Florin Iacob (to Târgu Mureș, previously on loan at Brașov)
—	DF	Romania	Lucian Asanache (on loan to Luceafărul Oradea, previously on loan at Foresta Suceava)
—	DF	Cameroon	Patrice Feussi (to Free agent)
—	DF	Netherlands	Milano Koenders (to Free agent)
—	DF	Romania	Cristian Melinte (to ACS Poli Timișoara)
—	DF	Romania	Alexandru Vagner (to Petrolul Ploiești, previously on loan at Brașov)
—	DF	Romania	Andrei Voineag (to Sportul Snagov)
—	DF	Austria	Toni Tipurić (to Free agent)
—	DF	Croatia	Josip Zeba (to Free agent)
—	MF	Romania	Alin Buleică (to UTA Arad)
—	MF	Romania	Marius Cocîrlă (to Pandurii Târgu Jiu)
—	MF	Romania	Raul Costin (to Argeș Pitești)
—	MF	Romania	Ovidiu Herea (to Viitorul Constanța)
—	MF	Romania	Valentin Munteanu (to Dunărea Călărași)
—	MF	Romania	Tiberiu Serediuc (to Botoșani)
—	FW	Romania	Valentin Alexandru (to Dunărea Călărași)
—	FW	Romania	Marian Constantinescu (to Academica Clinceni)

=== CS U Craiova ===
In:

No.	Pos.	Nation	Player
—	GK	Romania	Cristian Dică (loan return from Metaloglobus București)
—	GK	Romania	Laurențiu Popescu (loan return from Pandurii Târgu Jiu)
—	GK	Switzerland	Miodrag Mitrović (from (Switzerland) Chiasso)
—	DF	Croatia	Niko Datković (on loan from (Italy) Spezia)
—	DF	Portugal	Tiago Ferreira (from (Portugal) União Madeira)
—	DF	Switzerland	Ivan Martić (from (Croatia) Rijeka)
—	DF	Croatia	Hrvoje Spahija (from Voluntari)
—	MF	Romania	Cristian Bărbuț (from Poli Timișoara)
—	MF	Romania	Alexandru Mitriță (on loan from (Italy) Pescara)
—	MF	Italy	Fausto Rossi (from (Italy) Trapani)
—	FW	Romania	Mihai Roman (from (Netherlands) NEC, previously on loan at (Israel) Maccabi Petah Tikva)

Out:

No.	Pos.	Nation	Player
—	GK	Portugal	Pedro Mingote (to Juventus București)
—	GK	Romania	Andrei Vlad (to Steaua București)
—	DF	Ivory Coast	Stephane Acka (to (Turkey) BB Erzurumspor)
—	DF	France	Alexandre Barthe (to (Bulgaria) CSKA Sofia)
—	DF	Romania	Bogdan Bucurică (to Concordia Chiajna)
—	DF	Romania	Andrei Dumitraș (to Viitorul Constanța)
—	DF	Romania	Ștefan Vlădoiu (on loan to Sportul Snagov)
—	MF	Romania	Stephan Drăghici (on loan to Academica Clinceni)
—	MF	Romania	Bogdan Geanimu (to CSO Filiași)
—	DF	Cape Verde	Kay (to (Cyprus) Omonia)
—	MF	Brazil	Madson (to (Greece) Atromitos)
—	MF	Romania	Alin Manea (on loan to Sportul Snagov)
—	MF	Cape Verde	Nuno Rocha (to (Russia) Tosno)
—	MF	Romania	Laurențiu Roman (to Șirineasa)
—	MF	Romania	Sebastian Tătulea (to Național Sebiș)
—	FW	Bosnia and Herzegovina	Nusmir Fajić (to (Bosnia and Herzegovina) Krupa)
—	FW	Croatia	Filip Jazvić (to (Poland) Arka Gdynia)
—	FW	Romania	Sergiu Jurj (on loan to Olimpia Satu Mare, previously on loan at (Italy) Verona)
—	FW	Romania	Simon Măzărache (on loan to Juventus București)
—	FW	Romania	Andrei Ivan (to (Russia) Krasnodar)

=== CSM Politehnica Iași ===
In:

No.	Pos.	Nation	Player
—	DF	Romania	Andu Moisi (from Știința Miroslava)
—	MF	Romania	Marius Chelaru (loan return from Știința Miroslava)
—	GK	Croatia	Ivan Kelava (from (Hungary) Debrecen)
—	GK	Moldova	Alexei Koșelev (from (Moldova) Sheriff Tiraspol)
—	DF	Cape Verde	Tiago Almeida (from (Portugal) Moreirense)
—	MF	Romania	Ionuț Cioinac (from Pandurii Târgu Jiu)
—	MF	Portugal	Pedro Mendes (from (Portugal) Pinhalnovense)
—	MF	Cape Verde	Platini (from (United Arab Emirates) Dibba Al-Hisn)
—	MF	Norway	Kamer Qaka (from (Norway) Kristiansund)
—	MF	Romania	Andrei Sin (from Târgu Mureș)
—	MF	Moldova	Dan Spătaru (from Dinamo București)
—	MF	Moldova	Alexandru Vremea (from (Moldova) Academia Chișinău)
—	MF	Romania	Cătălin Ștefănescu (from Steaua București, previously on loan)
—	FW	Guinea	Salim Cissé (from (Portugal) Olhanense)
—	FW	Uganda	Luwagga Kizito (from (Portugal) Rio Ave)
—	FW	Brazil	Jô Santos (from (Moldova) Sheriff Tiraspol)

Out:

No.	Pos.	Nation	Player
—	GK	Romania	Cosmin Anton (to Pașcani, previously on loan to Știința Miroslava)
—	GK	Italy	Alessandro Caparco (to Concordia Chiajna)
—	GK	Bosnia and Herzegovina	Branko Grahovac (to UTA Arad)
—	DF	Romania	Silviu Cerneuțanu (to Știința Miroslava, previously on loan)
—	DF	Romania	Mădălin Ciucă (to UTA Arad)
—	DF	Serbia	Milan Mitić (to Gaz Metan Mediaș)
—	DF	Philippines	Daisuke Sato (to (Denmark) Horsens)
—	DF	Romania	Ionuț Voicu (to Gaz Metan Mediaș)
—	MF	Romania	Robert Asăvoaei (on loan to Știința Miroslava)
—	MF	Hungary	Lukács Bőle (to (Hungary) Ferencváros)
—	MF	Romania	Alexandru Ciucur (to ACS Poli Timișoara)
—	MF	Romania	Vasile Gheorghe (to Concordia Chiajna)
—	MF	Romania	Alin Huțanu (to Pașcani, previously on loan to Știința Miroslava)
—	MF	Romania	Alexandru Răuță (to Voluntari)
—	MF	Cape Verde	Sténio (to (Moldova) Dacia Chișinău)
—	MF	Romania	Marian Târșa (to Botoșani)
—	MF	Romania	Alexandru Țigănașu (to ACS Poli Timișoara)
—	FW	Moldova	Alexandru Boiciuc (to Târgu Mureș, previously on loan at (Moldova) Milsami Orhei)
—	FW	Romania	Mădălin Crengăniș (to Free agent, previously on loan at Știința Miroslava)
—	FW	Bosnia and Herzegovina	Bojan Golubović (to Gaz Metan Mediaș)

=== Dinamo București ===
In:

No.	Pos.	Nation	Player
—	GK	Romania	Vlad Muțiu (loan return from Afumați)
—	DF	Romania	Mihai Codreanu (loan return from Dunărea Călărași)
—	DF	Romania	Daniel Groza (loan return from Luceafărul Oradea)
—	DF	Romania	Constantin Nica (on loan from (Italy) Atalanta, previously on loan at (Italy) Latina)
—	MF	Romania	Paul Anton (loan return from (Spain) Getafe)
—	MF	Romania	Valentin Costache (loan return from Afumați)
—	FW	Romania	Robert Moldoveanu (loan return from Brașov)
—	DF	Greece	Giorgos Katsikas (from (Denmark) Esbjerg)
—	MF	Uruguay	Juan Albín (on loan from (Mexico) Veracruz)
—	MF	Portugal	Filipe Nascimento (from CFR Cluj)
—	MF	Portugal	Diogo Salomão (from (Spain) Mallorca)
—	FW	DR Congo	Jeremy Bokila (on loan from (Turkey) Akhisar Belediyespor, previously on loan at CFR Cluj)

Out:

No.	Pos.	Nation	Player
—	DF	France	Claude Dielna (loan return to Sheffield Wednesday, later signed by (United States) New England Revolution)
—	GK	Romania	Alexandru Burci (on loan to Atletic Bradu)
—	GK	Lithuania	Vytautas Černiauskas (to (Bulgaria) CSKA Sofia)
—	GK	Romania	Iustin Popescu (on loan to Chindia Târgoviște)
—	DF	Romania	Roberto Anghel (on loan to SC Popești-Leordeni)
—	DF	Romania	Sebastian Bucur (to Afumați, previously on loan at Târgu Mureș)
—	DF	Italy	Luca Ceccarelli (to San Marino Calcio)
—	DF	Romania	Denis Ciobotariu (on loan to Chindia Târgoviște)
—	DF	Romania	Constantin Dima (on loan to Sepsi Sfântu Gheorghe, previously on loan at Sportul Snagov)
—	DF	Romania	Petre Giuga (on loan to Șirineasa)
—	DF	Romania	Daniel Groza (on loan to Academica Clinceni, previously on loan at Luceafărul Oradea)
—	DF	Romania	Vlad Olteanu (on loan to Voluntari, previously on loan at Sepsi Sfântu Gheorghe)
—	DF	Romania	Mihai Popescu (on loan to Voluntari)
—	MF	Uruguay	Juan Albín (loan return to (Mexico) Veracruz)
—	MF	Romania	Claudiu Bumba (to Concordia Chiajna)
—	MF	Bosnia and Herzegovina	Azer Bušuladžić (to (Greece) Atromitos)
—	MF	Romania	Valentin Lazăr (to (Qatar) Al-Sailiya, previously on loan)
—	MF	Croatia	Antun Palić (to (Belgium) Royal Excel Mouscron)
—	MF	Romania	Andreas Mihaiu (on loan to Voința Turnu Măgurele)
—	MF	Romania	Raul Negotei (on loan to Metaloglobus București)
—	MF	Romania	Dan Nistor (to CFR Cluj)
—	MF	Romania	Patrick Petre (on loan to Sepsi Sfântu Gheorghe)
—	MF	Moldova	Dan Spătaru (to CSM Politehnica Iași)
—	MF	Romania	Andrei Tîrcoveanu (on loan to Gaz Metan Mediaș)
—	MF	Romania	Laurențiu Manole (on loan to Gaz Metan Mediaș, previously on loan at Sepsi Sfântu Gheorghe)
—	MF	Romania	Vlăduț Vlad (on loan to Metaloglobus București)
—	FW	Jordan	Tha'er Bawab (on loan to Concordia Chiajna)
—	FW	Romania	Silviu Oprescu (on loan to FCM Alexandria)
—	FW	Romania	Mihai Neicuțescu (on loan to Chindia Târgoviște)
—	FW	Romania	Daniel Popa (on loan to Botoșani)

=== Gaz Metan Mediaș ===
In:

No.	Pos.	Nation	Player
—	DF	Romania	Sorin Bușu (from Râmnicu Vâlcea, previously on loan at Pandurii Târgu Jiu)
—	DF	Romania	Ionuț Voicu (from CSM Politehnica Iași)
—	DF	Croatia	Filip Žderić (from (Croatia) Cibalia)
—	DF	Serbia	Milan Mitić (from CSM Politehnica Iași)
—	DF	Serbia	Milan Perendija (from (Serbia) Radnički Niš)
—	DF	Romania	Cristian Sîrghi (from Pandurii Târgu Jiu)
—	DF	Romania	Marius Constantin (from Viitorul Constanța)
—	MF	Romania	Alexandru Curtean (from Free agent)
—	MF	Belgium	Emmerik De Vriese (from (Cyprus) Ermis Aradippou)
—	MF	Portugal	Paulo Jorge (from (Germany) TuS Erndtebrück)
—	MF	Romania	Laurențiu Manole (on loan from Dinamo București, previously on loan at Sepsi Sfântu Gheorghe)
—	MF	Romania	Ionuț Neagu (from Free agent)
—	MF	Romania	Sergiu Popovici (from Botoșani)
—	MF	Romania	Olivian Surugiu (from Pandurii Târgu Jiu)
—	MF	Romania	Andrei Tîrcoveanu (on loan from Dinamo București)
—	FW	Bosnia and Herzegovina	Bojan Golubović (from CSM Politehnica Iași)
—	FW	Albania	Fabian Lokaj (from (Switzerland) Chiasso)
—	FW	Serbia	Nikola Stojanović (from (Serbia) OFK Beograd)

Out:

No.	Pos.	Nation	Player
—	FW	Romania	Cristian Gavra (loan return to Viitorul Constanța)
—	GK	Romania	Andrei Marinescu (to Afumați)
—	DF	Romania	Ionuț Buzean (to Retired)
—	DF	Romania	Valentin Crețu (to ACS Poli Timișoara)
—	DF	Congo	Bernard Itoua (to (Cyprus) Alki Oroklini)
—	DF	Croatia	Dario Rugašević (to (Poland) Piast Gliwice)
—	DF	Serbia	Jasmin Trtovac (to (Turkey) BB Erzurumspor)
—	DF	Romania	Radu Zaharia (to (Cyprus) Ermis Aradippou)
—	MF	Romania	Valentin Coșereanu (to Free agent)
—	MF	Romania	Sabin Lupu (to Hermannstadt)
—	MF	Romania	Alexandru Munteanu (to ACS Poli Timișoara)
—	MF	Brazil	Eric Pereira (to Viitorul Constanța)
—	MF	Romania	Ciprian Petre (to Juventus București)
—	MF	Romania	Mihai Stancu (on loan to Hermannstadt)
—	MF	Algeria	Aymen Tahar (to (Portugal) Boavista)
—	MF	Romania	Răzvan Trif (to Luceafărul Oradea)
—	FW	Austria	Daniel Sikorski (to (Cyprus) Pafos)
—	FW	Serbia	Nikola Stojanović (to (Serbia) Sloboda Užice)

=== Juventus București ===
In:

No.	Pos.	Nation	Player
—	MF	Romania	Marian Stoenac (loan return from Cetate Deva)
—	GK	Romania	Virgil Drăghia (from Concordia Chiajna)
—	GK	Portugal	Pedro Mingote (from CS U Craiova)
—	DF	Romania	Alexandru Benga (from (Cyprus) Ermis Aradippou)
—	MF	Romania	Dan Bucșa (from (Israel) Hapoel Bnei Lod)
—	MF	Romania	Vasile Dănilă (from Foresta Suceava)
—	MF	Georgia	Nika Dzalamidze (from (Poland) Górnik Łęczna)
—	MF	Romania	Ciprian Petre (from Gaz Metan Mediaș)
—	MF	Romania	Andrei Lungu (from (Israel) Hapoel Nir Ramat HaSharon)
—	MF	Bosnia and Herzegovina	Ivan Sesar (from (Bosnia and Herzegovina) Široki Brijeg)
—	FW	Romania	Simon Măzărache (on loan from CSU Craiova)
—	FW	Romania	Cătălin Țîră (from Dunărea Călărași)

Out:

No.	Pos.	Nation	Player
—	GK	Romania	Horia Ciobanu (on loan to Balotești)
—	GK	Romania	Károly Fila (to Sportul Snagov)
—	GK	Portugal	Pedro Mingote (to Free agent)
—	DF	Romania	Vlad Opriș (on loan to Balotești, previously on loan at CSMȘ Reșița)
—	MF	Romania	Sorin Bustea (on loan to Sportul Snagov)
—	MF	Romania	Vasile Dănilă (on loan to Foresta Suceava)
—	MF	Romania	Andrei Rontea (to (Germany) VfL Heinfield, previously on loan return to Balotești)
—	MF	Romania	Alexandru Vasile (to Oțelul Galați)
—	MF	Romania	Dan Bucșa (to Concordia Chiajna)
—	FW	Romania	Vasile Buhăescu (to Argeș Pitești)
—	FW	Romania	Bogdan Chipirliu (to Astra Giurgiu)
—	FW	Romania	Dragoș Florea (to Free agent)
—	FW	Romania	Adrian Hurdubei (on loan to Balotești)
—	FW	Romania	Alin Ilin (to Tunari)
—	FW	Romania	George Mareș (to Free agent)
—	FW	Romania	Alexandru Muscă (on loan to Oțelul Galați)
—	FW	Romania	Eugen Nica (on loan to Balotești)
—	FW	Romania	Alexandru Roșca (to Dunărea Călărași)

=== Sepsi Sfântu Gheorghe ===
In:

No.	Pos.	Nation	Player
—	GK	Romania	Bogdan Miron (from UTA Arad)
—	DF	Romania	Constantin Dima (on loan from Dinamo București, previously on loan at Sportul Snagov)
—	DF	Romania	Constantin Grecu (from Free agent)
—	DF	Romania	Cristian Oroş (from Astra Giurgiu)
—	MF	Romania	Claudiu Herea (from Balotești)
—	MF	Lithuania	Marius Papšys (from (Lithuania) Stumbras)
—	MF	Romania	Patrick Petre (on loan from Dinamo București)
—	MF	North Macedonia	Milovan Petrovikj (on loan from (Croatia) Osijek)
—	MF	Lithuania	Linas Pilibaitis (from (Lithuania) Atlantas Klaipėda)
—	FW	Romania	Victoraș Astafei (from (Malaysia) Selangor)
—	FW	Montenegro	Stefan Nikolić (from (Kazakhstan) Kaisar)
—	FW	Romania	István Fülöp (on loan from (Hungary) Diósgyőr)

Out:

No.	Pos.	Nation	Player
—	MF	Romania	Laurențiu Manole (loan return to Dinamo București, later on loan to Gaz Metan Mediaș)
—	DF	Romania	Vlad Olteanu (loan return to Dinamo București, later on loan to Voluntari)
—	MF	Romania	Răzvan Greu (loan return to Botoșani)
—	DF	Romania	Paul Chiș (to Universitatea Cluj)
—	DF	Romania	Zsolt Tankó (to KSE Târgu Secuiesc, previously on loan)
—	MF	Romania	Róbert Jakab (to FK Miercurea Ciuc)
—	MF	Romania	Bogdan Minciună (to Olimpic Cetate Râșnov)
—	MF	Romania	Ionuț Plămadă (to ASU Politehnica Timișoara)
—	MF	Romania	Costinel Tofan (to Argeș Pitești)
—	MF	Romania	Alexandru Țuțu (to AFC Hărman)
—	FW	Romania	Benjamin Bagoly (to FK Miercurea Ciuc, previously on loan at AFC Odorheiu Secuiesc)
—	FW	Romania	Vlad Bujor (to Pandurii Târgu Jiu)
—	FW	Romania	Daniel Ene (to Mioveni)

=== Steaua București ===
In:

No.	Pos.	Nation	Player
—	DF	Romania	Dan Popescu (loan return from Concordia Chiajna)
—	MF	Romania	Daniel Benzar (loan return from Academica Clinceni)
—	MF	Romania	Rareș Enceanu (loan return from Brașov)
—	GK	Romania	Toma Niga (from Foresta Suceava)
—	GK	Romania	Andrei Vlad (from CS U Craiova)
—	GK	Romania	Ionuț Poiană (loan return from Luceafărul Oradea)
—	DF	Romania	Romario Benzar (from Viitorul Constanța)
—	DF	Romania	Ionuț Larie (from CFR Cluj)
—	DF	Brazil	Júnior Morais (from Astra Giurgiu)
—	DF	Portugal	Artur Jorge (on loan from (Portugal) Braga, previously on loan at (Belgium) Royal Excel Mouscron)
—	DF	Serbia	Bogdan Planić (from (Serbia) Vojvodina)
—	MF	Romania	Paul Szecui (from FC Argeș)
—	MF	Portugal	Filipe Teixeira (from Astra Giurgiu)
—	MF	Romania	Cătălin Golofca (from Botoșani)
—	MF	Romania	Dragoș Nedelcu (from Viitorul Constanța)
—	FW	Romania	Constantin Budescu (from Astra Giurgiu)
—	FW	Romania	Florinel Coman (from Viitorul Constanța)
—	FW	Romania	Robert Grecu (on loan from Viitorul Constanța, previously on loan at Argeș Pitești)

Out:

No.	Pos.	Nation	Player
—	GK	Romania	Valentin Cojocaru (to (Cyprus) Apollon Limassol, previously on loan at (Italy) Frosinone)
—	GK	Romania	Toma Niga (on loan to Academica Clinceni)
—	GK	Romania	Ionuț Poiană (on loan to Luceafărul Oradea)
—	DF	Romania	Gabriel Tamaș (to (Israel) Hapoel Haifa)
—	DF	Romania	Gabriel Simion (on loan to Academica Clinceni)
—	MF	Brazil	Fernando Boldrin (to (Turkey) Kayserispor)
—	MF	Algeria	Jugurtha Hamroun (to (Qatar) Al Sadd, previously on loan)
—	MF	Croatia	Antonio Jakoliš (on loan to (Cyprus) Apollon Limassol)
—	MF	Romania	Mario Mihai (on loan to Academica Clinceni)
—	MF	Romania	Vlad Mihalcea (on loan to Academica Clinceni, previously on loan at ACS Poli Timișoara)
—	MF	DR Congo	Wilfred Moke (to (Turkey) Konyaspor)
—	MF	Ghana	Sulley Muniru (to Free agent)
—	MF	Romania	Robert Vâlceanu (to Astra Giurgiu, previously on loan at UTA Arad)
—	MF	Romania	Cătălin Ștefănescu (to CSM Politehnica Iași, previously on loan)
—	MF	Romania	Sebastian Chitoșcă (to Botoșani, previously on loan at Brașov)
—	FW	Romania	Cristian Onțel (to Voința Turnu Măgurele, previously on loan at Academica Clinceni)
—	FW	Romania	Alexandru Tudorie (to Voluntari)
—	FW	Romania	Robert Grecu (loan return to Viitorul Constanța, later on loan to Argeș Pitești)

=== Viitorul Constanța ===
In:

No.	Pos.	Nation	Player
—	FW	Romania	Florin Cioablă (loan return from Academica Clinceni)
—	FW	Romania	Cristian Gavra (loan return from Gaz Metan Mediaș)
—	DF	Romania	Marius Constantin (from Târgu Mureș)
—	DF	Netherlands	Bradley de Nooijer (from (Netherlands) Dordrecht)
—	DF	Romania	Andrei Dumitraș (from CSU Craiova)
—	DF	Romania	Răzvan Horj (from CFR Cluj)
—	MF	Romania	Ovidiu Herea (from Concordia Chiajna)
—	MF	Brazil	Eric Pereira (from Gaz Metan Mediaș)

Out:

No.	Pos.	Nation	Player
—	GK	Romania	Cătălin Căbuz (on loan to Hermannstadt, previously on loan at Chindia Târgoviște)
—	GK	Romania	Cosmin Dur-Bozoancă (on loan to ASU Politehnica Timișoara)
—	DF	Romania	Romario Benzar (to Steaua București)
—	DF	Romania	Dan Panait (on loan to Târgu Mureș)
—	DF	Romania	Szabolcs Kilyen (on loan to Târgu Mureș)
—	DF	Romania	Ciprian Perju (on loan to Afumați, previously on loan to Academica Clinceni)
—	DF	Romania	Cătălin Toriște (on loan to FC Argeș, previously on loan at Metalurgistul Cugir)
—	DF	Romania	Andrei Dumitraș (to Botoșani)
—	DF	Romania	Marius Constantin (to Gaz Metan Mediaș)
—	DF	Ivory Coast	Kévin Boli (to CFR Cluj)
—	MF	Romania	Antonio Cruceru (to FC Argeș, previously on loan at Academica Clinceni)
—	MF	Romania	Ovidiu Herea (to Free agent)
—	MF	Romania	Paul Iacob (on loan to Târgu Mureș, previously on loan at Brașov)
—	MF	Romania	Dragoș Nedelcu (to Steaua București)
—	MF	Romania	Florin Nicolescu (on loan to Afumați)
—	MF	Romania	Gabriel Preoteasa (to Dunărea Călărași, previously on loan)
—	MF	Romania	Florin Purece (to (Israel) Hapoel Ra'anana)
—	MF	Romania	Neluț Roșu (to (Bulgaria) Levski Sofia)
—	MF	Romania	George Tudoran (to Pandurii Târgu Jiu, previously on loan at Olimpia Satu Mare)
—	MF	Romania	Bogdan Vasile (to Dunărea Călărași, previously on loan at (Moldova) Zimbru Chișinău)
—	FW	Romania	Robert Grecu (on loan to Steaua București, previously on loan at FC Argeș)
—	FW	Romania	Florinel Coman (to Steaua București)
—	FW	Romania	Gabriel Iancu (to (Poland) Bruk-Bet Termalica Nieciecza)
—	FW	Romania	Mircea Manole (on loan to Afumați)
—	FW	Romania	Vlad Morar (to (Greece) Panetolikos)
—	FW	Romania	Alexandru Stoica (on loan to Târgu Mureș)

=== Voluntari ===
In:

No.	Pos.	Nation	Player
—	FW	Romania	Adrian Voicu (loan return from Olimpia Satu Mare)
—	DF	Romania	Vlad Olteanu (on loan from Dinamo București, previously on loan at Sepsi Sfântu Gheorghe)
—	DF	Romania	Mihai Popescu (on loan from Dinamo București)
—	MF	Romania	Adelin Pîrcălabu (from Pandurii Târgu Jiu)
—	MF	Romania	Alexandru Răuță (from CSM Politehnica Iași)
—	FW	Romania	Alexandru Tudorie (from Steaua București)

Out:

No.	Pos.	Nation	Player
—	GK	Romania	Mircea Bornescu (to Retired)
—	DF	Romania	Marius Halmaghe (to Sportul Snagov)
—	DF	Croatia	Hrvoje Spahija (to CS U Craiova)
—	MF	Romania	Alexandru Coman (to Balotești)
—	MF	Romania	Sorin Ispir (to Afumați)
—	MF	Romania	Vasile Nicolae (on loan to Afumați)
—	MF	Romania	Raphael Stănescu (to Farul Constanța)
—	FW	Romania	Costin Curelea (to Free agent)

== Liga II ==
=== Academica Clinceni ===
In:

No.	Pos.	Nation	Player
—	GK	Romania	Eduard Ispas (from Sportul Studențesc București)
—	GK	Romania	Toma Niga (on loan from Steaua București)
—	GK	Romania	Andrei Ureche (from (Spain) Unión Adarve)
—	DF	Romania	Daniel Groza (on loan from Dinamo București, previously on loan at Luceafărul Oradea)
—	DF	Nigeria	Samson Nwabueze (from Râmnicu Vâlcea)
—	DF	Romania	Mihai Şandru (from Argeș Pitești)
—	DF	Romania	Ionuț Tătaru (from Pandurii Târgu Jiu)
—	DF	Romania	Gabriel Simion (on loan from Steaua București)
—	MF	Romania	Cristian Balgiu (from Târgu Mureș)
—	MF	Romania	Bogdan Barbu (on loan from Viitorul Domnești)
—	MF	Romania	Mădălin Calu (from Dacia Unirea Brăila)
—	MF	Romania	Stephan Drăghici (on loan from CSU Craiova)
—	MF	Romania	Cătălin Găină (on loan from Viitorul Domnești)
—	MF	Romania	Ciprian Gliga (from Avântul Reghin)
—	MF	Romania	Mario Mihai (on loan from Steaua București)
—	MF	Romania	Vlad Mihalcea (on loan from Steaua București, previously on loan at ACS Poli Timișoara)
—	FW	Romania	Andrei Blejdea (from (Germany) Eintracht Braunschweig II)
—	FW	Romania	Marian Constantinescu (from Concordia Chiajna)
—	FW	Romania	Alexandru Văduva (from Viitorul Domnești)

Out:

No.	Pos.	Nation	Player
—	DF	Romania	Andrei Chindriș (loan return to Botoșani)
—	DF	Romania	Ciprian Perju (loan return to Viitorul Constanța)
—	MF	Romania	Daniel Benzar (loan return to Steaua București)
—	MF	Romania	Antonio Cruceru (loan return to Viitorul Constanța)
—	FW	Romania	Florin Cioablă (loan return to Viitorul Constanța)
—	FW	Romania	Cristian Onțel (loan return to Steaua București, later signed by Voința Turnu Măgurele)
—	GK	Romania	Andrei Crivăț (to Metalurgistul Cugir)
—	GK	Romania	Horia Iancu (to CSA Steaua București)
—	GK	Romania	Florin Matache (to Flacăra Horezu)
—	GK	Romania	Teodor Rudnițchi (to Free agent)
—	DF	Romania	Marian Marin (to CSM Roman)
—	DF	Romania	Andrei Nițu (to Free agent)
—	DF	Romania	Laurențiu Vențer (to Free agent)
—	MF	Romania	Hristu Chiacu (to Free agent)
—	MF	Romania	Cristinel Matei (to Chindia Târgoviște)
—	MF	Romania	Bogdan Stancu (to Free agent)
—	MF	Romania	Adrian Udrea (to Free agent)

=== Afumați ===
In:

No.	Pos.	Nation	Player
—	GK	Romania	Andrei Marinescu (from Gaz Metan Mediaș)
—	DF	Romania	Ionuț Baniță (from Viitorul Domnești)
—	DF	Romania	Sebastian Bucur (from Dinamo București, previously on loan at Târgu Mureș)
—	DF	Romania	Ciprian Perju (on loan from Viitorul Constanța)
—	MF	Romania	Sorin Ispir (from Voluntari)
—	MF	Romania	Vasile Nicolae (on loan from Voluntari)
—	MF	Romania	Florin Nicolescu (on loan from Viitorul Constanța)
—	MF	Romania	Răzvan Onea (from LPS Satu Mare)
—	FW	Romania	Robert Buduroi (from Sportul Snagov)
—	FW	Romania	Mircea Manole (on loan from Viitorul Constanța)

Out:

No.	Pos.	Nation	Player
—	GK	Romania	Vlad Muțiu (loan return to Dinamo București)
—	MF	Romania	Valentin Costache (loan return to Dinamo București)
—	DF	Romania	Marian Botea (to Farul Constanța)
—	DF	Romania	Sebastian Bucur (to Știința Miroslava)
—	DF	Romania	Ștefan Covalschi (to ACS Poli Timișoara)
—	MF	Romania	Ionuț Petculescu (to Național Sebiș)
—	FW	Romania	Adrian Popa (to Flacăra Horezu)
—	FW	Romania	Bobi Verdeș (to Flacăra Horezu)

=== Argeș Pitești ===
In:

No.	Pos.	Nation	Player
—	GK	Romania	Alexandru Oprican (loan return from Atletic Bradu)
—	FW	Romania	Adelin Voinescu (loan return from Atletic Bradu)
—	GK	Romania	Nicușor Grecu (from Free agent)
—	GK	Romania	Octavian Popescu (from Mioveni)
—	DF	Romania	Cătălin Stan (from Brașov)
—	DF	Romania	Cătălin Toriște (on loan from Viitorul Constanța, previously on loan at Metalurgistul Cugir)
—	DF	Romania	Bogdan Vișa (from Mioveni)
—	MF	Romania	Raul Costin (from Concordia Chiajna)
—	MF	Romania	Antonio Cruceru (on loan from Viitorul Constanța, previously on loan at Academica Clinceni)
—	MF	Romania	Alin Popa (from Mioveni)
—	MF	Romania	Costinel Tofan (from Sepsi Sfântu Gheorghe)
—	FW	Romania	Vasile Buhăescu (from Juventus București)
—	FW	Romania	Andrei Nilă (from Mioveni)
—	FW	Romania	Robert Grecu (on loan from Viitorul Constanța, previously on loan at Steaua București)

Out:

No.	Pos.	Nation	Player
—	GK	Romania	Dragoș Petrișor (loan return to FC Dănuț Coman)
—	MF	Romania	Alexandru Crivac (loan return to FC Dănuț Coman)
—	GK	Romania	Dragoș Dumitrescu (to Unirea Slobozia)
—	GK	Romania	Andrei Udeanu (to Oțelul Galați)
—	DF	Romania	Andrei Oreviceanu (to Astra II)
—	DF	Romania	Mihai Şandru (to Academica Clinceni)
—	DF	Romania	Andrei Trușescu (to (Italy) Roma)
—	DF	Romania	Ionuț Zăinescu (to Național Sebiș)
—	MF	Romania	Marian Anghelina (to Șirineasa)
—	MF	Romania	Alin Bărîcă (to Free agent, previously on loan at Astra II)
—	MF	Romania	Leonard Manole (to Șirineasa)
—	MF	Romania	Cosmin Piscanu (to Atletic Bradu)
—	MF	Romania	Paul Szecui (to Steaua București)
—	FW	Romania	Robert Grecu (loan return to Viitorul Constanța, later signed by Steaua București)
—	FW	Romania	Adelin Voinescu (on loan to Național Sebiș)

=== ASU Politehnica Timișoara ===
In:

No.	Pos.	Nation	Player
—	GK	Romania	Cosmin Dur-Bozoancă (on loan from Viitorul Constanța)
—	GK	Romania	Emanuel Fișteag (loan return from Național Sebiș)
—	DF	Romania	Ionuț Coadă (from UTA Arad)
—	DF	Romania	Radu Motreanu (on loan from ACS Poli Timișoara)
—	DF	Bosnia and Herzegovina	Borislav Topić (from (Bosnia and Herzegovina) Jedinstvo Bihać)
—	MF	Romania	Alin Crișanov (from Free agent)
—	MF	Romania	Alin Ignea (from ACS Poli Timișoara)
—	MF	Romania	Raul Krausz (from Olimpia Satu Mare)
—	MF	Romania	Ionuț Plămadă (from Sepsi Sfântu Gheorghe)
—	MF	Romania	Adrian Poparadu (from ACS Poli Timișoara)
—	MF	Romania	Cornel Predescu (from Free agent)
—	MF	Romania	Deian Sorescu (from Free agent)
—	FW	Romania	Marius Staicu (from Mioveni)

Out:

No.	Pos.	Nation	Player
—	GK	Romania	Ricardo Filip (to AFC Odorheiu Secuiesc)
—	GK	Romania	Victor Gârlea (to Șirineasa)
—	DF	Romania	Cristian Gălan (to Timișul Șag)
—	DF	Romania	Laurențiu Telescu (to ACS Dumbrăvița)
—	MF	Romania	Alexandru Birău (to (Austria) Union Bad Hall)
—	MF	Romania	Răzvan Gorovei (to Bradul Borca)
—	MF	Romania	Darius Neamțu (on loan to Ripensia Timișoara)
—	MF	Romania	Bogdan Nicolescu (to Free agent)
—	MF	Romania	Adrian Ungureanu (loan return to Ripensia Timișoara)
—	MF	Romania	Ionuț Vucea (to Retired)
—	FW	Romania	Ștefan Blănaru (to Hermannstadt)
—	FW	Romania	Arthur Teuț (to Free agent)

=== Balotești ===
In:

No.	Pos.	Nation	Player
—	GK	Romania	Horia Ciobanu (on loan from Juventus București)
—	DF	Romania	Alexandru Gheorghe (from Afumați)
—	DF	Romania	Vlad Opriș (on loan from Juventus București, previously on loan at CSMȘ Reșița)
—	MF	Romania	Dănuț Ciubuc (on loan from Sporting Roșiori)
—	MF	Romania	Alexandru Coman (from Voluntari)
—	MF	Romania	Franco Paraschiv (from Sportul Snagov)
—	MF	Romania	Alin Pătrașcu (from Sportul Snagov)
—	FW	Romania	Adrian Hurdubei (on loan from Juventus București)
—	FW	Romania	Eugen Nica (on loan from Juventus București)
—	FW	Romania	Vlad Suciu (from Unirea Dej)

Out:

No.	Pos.	Nation	Player
—	DF	Romania	Ciprian Dicu (to Urban Titu)
—	DF	Romania	Alin Niță (to Free agent)
—	MF	Romania	Andrei Rontea (loan return to Juventus București)
—	MF	Romania	Paul Antoche (to Petrolul Ploiești)
—	MF	Romania	Claudiu Herea (to Sepsi Sfântu Gheorghe)
—	MF	Romania	George Ivan (to CS Tunari)
—	MF	Romania	Valentin Niculae (to Dunărea Călărași)
—	FW	Romania	Denis Dobra (to CS Tunari)

=== Chindia Târgoviște ===
In:

No.	Pos.	Nation	Player
—	GK	Romania	Iustin Popescu (on loan from Dinamo București)
—	DF	Romania	Lucian Acasandrei (from Flacăra Moreni)
—	DF	Romania	Denis Ciobotariu (on loan from Dinamo București)
—	DF	Romania	Eduard Cornea (from Cetate Deva)
—	MF	Romania	Cristinel Matei (from Academica Clinceni)
—	FW	Romania	Marius Bâtfoi (from Târgu Mureș)
—	FW	Romania	Mihai Neicuțescu (on loan from Dinamo București)

Out:

No.	Pos.	Nation	Player
—	GK	Romania	Cătălin Căbuz (loan return to Viitorul Constanța, later on loan to Hermannstadt)
—	DF	Romania	Claudiu Săftescu (loan return to Dinamo II București)
—	DF	Romania	Valentin Neaga (to Aninoasa, previously on loan at Aninoasa)
—	DF	Romania	Dragoș Pătru (to Retired)
—	MF	Romania	Vlad Parghel (on loan at Flacăra Moreni)
—	FW	Romania	Alin Neguț (on loan at Flacăra Moreni)

=== Dacia Unirea Brăila ===
In:

No.	Pos.	Nation	Player
—	GK	Romania	Florin Logofătu (from Free agent)
—	GK	Romania	Alexandru Țicrea (from Unirea Jucu)
—	DF	Romania	Gabriel Lazăr (from Unirea Slobozia)
—	DF	Romania	Marius Moroianu (loan return from Delta Dobrogea Tulcea)
—	MF	Romania	Andrei Banyoi (from Unirea Jucu)
—	MF	Romania	Olimpiu Bucur (from Unirea Jucu)
—	MF	Romania	Ovidiu Covaciu (from Unirea Jucu)
—	MF	Romania	Paul Cubleșan (from Unirea Jucu)
—	MF	Romania	Sorin Frunză (from Retired)
—	MF	Romania	Cosmin Mihai (from Pandurii Târgu Jiu)
—	FW	Romania	Alexandru Pop (from Dunărea Călărași)

Out:

No.	Pos.	Nation	Player
—	MF	Romania	Dănuţ Oprea (loan return to Olimpia Râmnicu Sărat)
—	GK	Romania	Florin Logofătu (to Free agent)
—	GK	Romania	Cristian Mitrea (to Free agent)
—	DF	Romania	Robert Moglan (to Free agent)
—	DF	Romania	Cosmin Necoară (to Free agent)
—	MF	Romania	Răzvan Adăscăliței (to Aerostar Bacău)
—	MF	Romania	Mădălin Calu (to Academica Clinceni)
—	MF	Romania	Gabriel Gheorghe (to Free agent)
—	MF	Romania	Marian Iordache (to Free agent)
—	MF	Romania	Cosmin Neagu (to Hermannstadt)
—	MF	Romania	Andrei Pușcașu (to Dunărea Călărași)
—	MF	Romania	Ionuț Văsîi (on loan to FC Urleasca)
—	FW	Romania	Dragoș Mucuță (to Hermannstadt, previously on loan at Sportul Chiscani)

=== Dunărea Călărași ===
In:

No.	Pos.	Nation	Player
—	DF	France	Aboubacar Gassama (from Free agent)
—	DF	Romania	Florin Ibrian (on loan from Unirea Slobozia)
—	DF	Romania	Bogdan Manole (on loan from Sporting Pitești)
—	DF	Romania	Marius Tomozei (from Luceafărul Oradea)
—	MF	Romania	Marian Drăghiceanu (from Free agent)
—	MF	Romania	Valentin Munteanu (from Concordia Chiajna)
—	MF	Romania	Valentin Niculae (from Balotești)
—	MF	Romania	Silviu Pană (from Olimpia Satu Mare)
—	MF	Romania	Gabriel Preoteasa (from Viitorul Constanța, previously on loan)
—	MF	Romania	Andrei Pușcașu (from Dacia Unirea Brăila)
—	MF	Romania	Bogdan Vasile (from Viitorul Constanța, previously on loan at (Moldova) Zimbru Chișinău)
—	FW	Romania	Valentin Alexandru (from Concordia Chiajna)
—	FW	Portugal	André Mesquita (from (Portugal) Aliança de Gandra)
—	FW	Gabon	Gaëtan Missi Mezu (from (France) Paris FC)
—	FW	Romania	Alexandru Pop (from Unirea Jucu)
—	FW	Romania	Alexandru Roșca (from Juventus București)
—	FW	Romania	Gelu Velici (from Național Sebiș)

Out:

No.	Pos.	Nation	Player
—	MF	Romania	Valentin Niculae (loan return to Benfica Nova Geracao)
—	GK	Romania	Ștefan Păun (to Agricola Borcea)
—	DF	Romania	Florin Ibrian (loan return to Unirea Slobozia)
—	DF	Romania	Bogdan Stancu (to Sportul Snagov)
—	MF	Romania	Alexandru Cincă (to Voința Turnu Măgurele)
—	MF	Romania	Alexandru Ciocâlteu (to Petrolul Ploiești)
—	MF	Romania	Rafael Licu (to Târgu Mureș)
—	MF	Hungary	Lehel Modra (to AFC Odorheiu Secuiesc)
—	MF	Romania	Victor Petre (to Free agent)
—	FW	Romania	Alexandru Avram (to Free agent)
—	FW	Romania	Daniel Gheorghe (to Înainte Modelu)
—	FW	Romania	Alexandru Pop (to Dacia Unirea Brăila)
—	FW	Romania	Alexandru Roșca (to Free agent)
—	FW	Romania	Mircea Ștefan (to Retired)
—	FW	Romania	Cătălin Țîră (to Juventus București)
—	FW	Romania	Gelu Velici (to CSM Lugoj)

=== Foresta Suceava ===
In:

No.	Pos.	Nation	Player
—	GK	Romania	Răzvan Began (from Luceafărul Oradea)
—	DF	Romania	Florin Cordoș (from Luceafărul Oradea)
—	DF	France	Issaga Diallo (from (Cyprus) Anagennisi Deryneia)
—	DF	Moldova	Alexandru Belevschi (from (Moldova) Milsami Orhei)
—	DF	Ghana	Daniel Pappoe (from (Maldives) New Radiant)
—	MF	France	Charles Acolatse (from (France) Les Herbiers)
—	MF	Romania	Vasile Dănilă (on loan from Juventus București)
—	MF	Congo	Allan Kimbaloula (from Sportul Snagov)
—	MF	Belgium	Wilhelm Renquin (from (Belgium) Ath)
—	MF	Moldova	Pavel Secrier (from (Moldova) Zimbru Chișinău)
—	FW	Morocco	Naoufal Boumina (from (Belgium) Racing Mechelen)
—	FW	France	Khalid Chalabi (from (France) Stade de Reims II)
—	FW	France	Belkacem Dali-Amar (from (France) Martigues)
—	FW	Romania	Marius Matei (from Luceafărul Oradea)

Out:

No.	Pos.	Nation	Player
—	DF	Romania	Lucian Asanache (loan return to Concordia Chiajna, later signed by Luceafărul Oradea)
—	GK	Romania	Vlad Hînțăscu (to Juniorul Suceava)
—	GK	Romania	Toma Niga (to Steaua București, later on loan to Academica Clinceni)
—	DF	Romania	Daniel Bălan (to Retired)
—	DF	Romania	Constantin Drugă (to Pandurii Târgu Jiu)
—	DF	Romania	Daniel Lung (to Pandurii Târgu Jiu)
—	DF	Romania	Ionuț Mihălăchioaie (to Aerostar Bacău)
—	DF	Romania	Alin Mutu (to Luceafărul Oradea)
—	DF	Romania	Dorin Semeghin (to Retired)
—	MF	Romania	Constantin Aeroaiei (to CSM Roman)
—	MF	Romania	Cosmin Buziuc (to Gaz Metan II Mediaș)
—	MF	Romania	Cornel Căinari (to Știința Miroslava)
—	MF	Romania	Vasile Dănilă (to Juventus București)
—	MF	Romania	Alin Florescu (to Bucovina Rădăuți)
—	MF	Romania	Cătălin Strugariu (to Free agent)
—	FW	Romania	Robert Grumezescu (to Sănătatea Dărăbani)
—	FW	Romania	Bogdan Rusu (to Hermannstadt)
—	FW	Romania	Cătălin Vraciu (to Aerostar Bacău)

=== Hermannstadt ===
In:

No.	Pos.	Nation	Player
—	GK	Romania	Cătălin Căbuz (on loan from Viitorul Constanța, previously on loan at Chindia Târgoviște)
—	GK	Romania	Horațiu Moldovan (on loan from CFR Cluj)
—	DF	Romania	Radu Crișan (on loan from Astra Giurgiu)
—	DF	Romania	Ionuț Stoica (from Mioveni)
—	MF	Romania	Robert Boboc (on loan from Astra Giurgiu)
—	MF	Romania	Sabin Lupu (from Gaz Metan Mediaș)
—	MF	Romania	Cosmin Neagu (from Dacia Unirea Brăila)
—	MF	Romania	Claudiu Pamfile (from Hărman)
—	MF	Romania	Iulian Popa (from Brașov)
—	MF	Romania	Mihai Stancu (on loan from Gaz Metan Mediaș)
—	FW	Romania	Ștefan Blănaru (from ASU Politehnica Timișoara)
—	FW	Romania	Andrei Herghelegiu (from Luceafărul Oradea)
—	FW	Romania	Dragoș Mucuță (from Dacia Unirea Brăila)
—	FW	Romania	Dan Roman (from UTA Arad)
—	FW	Romania	Bogdan Rusu (from Foresta Suceava)

Out:

No.	Pos.	Nation	Player
—	GK	Romania	Horațiu Moldovan (loan return to CFR Cluj)
—	GK	Romania	Loren Voicilă (loan return to CSM Râmnicu Vâlcea, later signed by Național Sebiș)
—	GK	Romania	Marius Zăvoi (to Performanța Ighiu)
—	DF	Romania	Andrei Mărginean (on loan to Performanța Ighiu)
—	DF	Romania	Paul Medeșan (on loan to Performanța Ighiu)
—	DF	Romania	Gabriel Oiță (to Șirineasa)
—	MF	Romania	Ionuț Bratima (to Păltiniș Rășinari)
—	MF	Romania	Andrei Câmpean (to Performanța Ighiu)
—	MF	Romania	Bogdan Piko (to Retired)
—	MF	Romania	Cătălin Tineiu (on loan to Performanța Ighiu)
—	MF	Romania	Daniel Unguru (on loan to Performanța Ighiu)
—	FW	Romania	Alexandru Fotescu (to Voința Turnu Măgurele)
—	FW	Romania	Andrei Moldovan (to Free agent)
—	FW	Romania	Cristian Seiwerth (on loan to Performanța Ighiu)

=== Luceafărul Oradea ===
In:

No.	Pos.	Nation	Player
—	GK	Greece	Giorgios Gakos (from Șirineasa)
—	GK	Romania	Ionuț Poiană (on loan from Steaua București)
—	DF	Romania	Lucian Asanache (on loan from Concordia Chiajna, previously on loan at Foresta Suceava)
—	DF	Romania	Daniel Ciobanu (from Pandurii Târgu Jiu)
—	DF	Romania	Andrei Cordoș (from (Maldives) Maziya)
—	DF	Romania	Daniel Groza (on loan from Dinamo București)
—	DF	Romania	Alexandru Iacob (from (Cyprus) Ethnikos Achna)
—	DF	Romania	Alin Mutu (from Foresta Suceava)
—	DF	Romania	Andrei Tânc (from CFR Cluj)
—	DF	Romania	Marius Tomozei (from Mioveni)
—	DF	Romania	Răzvan Trif (from Gaz Metan Mediaș)
—	MF	Romania	Marius Cioiu (from Pandurii Târgu Jiu)
—	MF	Romania	Darius Covaci (from UTA Arad)
—	MF	Romania	Andrei Dragu (from Șirineasa)
—	MF	Romania	Alexandru Dulca (from Dinamo II București)
—	MF	Romania	Petre Goge (from Brașov)
—	MF	Romania	Paul Păcurar (from Pandurii Târgu Jiu)
—	MF	Romania	Florian Pârvu (from Șirineasa)
—	FW	Romania	Andrei Antohi (from (Oman) Sohar)
—	FW	Romania	Andrei Herghelegiu (from Botoșani)
—	FW	Romania	Vlad Rusu (from (Belgium) Beerschot Wilrijk)

Out:

No.	Pos.	Nation	Player
—	GK	Romania	Răzvan Egri (to CA Oradea)
—	GK	Romania	Ionuț Poiană (loan return to Steaua București)
—	DF	Romania	Lucian Asanache (loan return to Concordia Chiajna, later on loan at Metaloglobus București)
—	DF	Romania	Sergiu Bactăr (to CSM Școlar Reșița)
—	DF	Romania	Andrei Cordoș (to Universitatea Cluj)
—	DF	Romania	Florin Cordoș (to Foresta Suceava)
—	DF	Romania	Daniel Groza (loan return to Dinamo București)
—	DF	Romania	Ionuț Hlinca (to Olimpia Satu Mare)
—	DF	Romania	Alexandru Iacob (to Rapid București)
—	DF	Romania	Sergiu Moga (to Free agent)
—	DF	Romania	Daniel Stan (to Bihorul Beiuș, previously on loan)
—	DF	Romania	Marius Tomozei (to Dunărea Călărași)
—	DF	Romania	Darius Ursu (to Steaua II București)
—	MF	Romania	Istvan Balla (to Dacia Gepiu)
—	MF	Romania	Darius Costea (to CA Oradea)
—	MF	Romania	Petre Goge (to Rapid București)
—	MF	Romania	Bogdan Miholca (to Olimpia Satu Mare)
—	MF	Romania	Paul Păcurar (to UTA Arad)
—	MF	Romania	Alin Predescu (to CSA Steaua București)
—	FW	Romania	Sergiu Arnăutu (to Petrolul Ploiești)
—	FW	Romania	Andrei Herghelegiu (to Hermannstadt)
—	FW	Romania	Marius Matei (to Foresta Suceava)

=== Metaloglobus București ===
In:

No.	Pos.	Nation	Player
—	GK	Romania	Robert Geantă (from Înainte Modelu)
—	DF	Romania	Lucian Asanache (on loan from Concordia Chiajna, previously on loan at Luceafărul Oradea)
—	DF	Romania	Florin Iordache (from Free agent)
—	DF	Romania	Andrei Roman (on loan from Astra Giurgiu)
—	MF	Romania	Dragoș Bătrînu (from Free agent)
—	MF	Romania	Costin Ciochină (from Steaua II București)
—	MF	Romania	Ionuț Marian (from CSM Râmnicu Vâlcea)
—	MF	Romania	Mădălin Martin (from Free agent)
—	MF	Romania	Raul Negotei (on loan from Dinamo București)
—	MF	Ghana	Gafaru Nasiru (from (Ghana) Ashanti Gold)
—	MF	Romania	Mădălin Răileanu (on loan from Astra Giurgiu)
—	MF	Romania	Vlăduț Vlad (on loan from Dinamo București)

Out:

No.	Pos.	Nation	Player
—	GK	Romania	Cristian Dică (loan return to CS U Craiova)
—	DF	Romania	Angelo Anghelini (to SC Popești-Leordeni)
—	DF	Romania	Valentin Harle (to Sf. Pantelimon)
—	DF	Romania	Gheorghe Mogoș (to Free agent)
—	MF	Nigeria	Abdul Fatai (to Tunari)
—	FW	Romania	Victor Militaru (to SC Popești-Leordeni)

=== Mioveni ===
In:

No.	Pos.	Nation	Player
—	DF	Romania	Costinel Gugu (from (France) Le Havre, previously on loan)
—	DF	Romania	Alexandru Ichim (from Brașov)
—	MF	Romania	Cristian Andor (from UTA Arad)
—	MF	Romania	Ciprian Negoiță (from Pandurii Târgu Jiu)
—	MF	Romania	George Pirtea (from Național Sebiș)
—	FW	Romania	Daniel Ene (from Sepsi Sfântu Gheorghe)

Out:

No.	Pos.	Nation	Player
—	MF	Romania	Robert Boboc (loan return to Astra Giurgiu)
—	GK	Romania	Octavian Popescu (to Argeș Pitești)
—	DF	Romania	Ionuț Stoica (to Hermannstadt)
—	DF	Romania	Marius Tomozei (to Luceafărul Oradea)
—	DF	Romania	Bogdan Vișa (to Argeș Pitești)
—	MF	Romania	Ionuț Biceanu (to Astra Giurgiu)
—	MF	Romania	Marius Galan (to CS Albota)
—	MF	Romania	Victor Mazilu (to Free agent)
—	MF	Romania	Daniel Iancu (to Free agent)
—	MF	Romania	Alin Popa (to Argeș Pitești)
—	FW	Romania	Andrei Nilă (to Argeș Pitești)
—	FW	Romania	Marius Staicu (to ASU Politehnica Timișoara)

=== Olimpia Satu Mare ===
In:

No.	Pos.	Nation	Player
—	GK	Romania	Bogdan Dascălu (on loan from Sporting Pitești)
—	DF	Romania	Paul Copaci (on loan from UTA Arad)
—	DF	Romania	Ionuț Hlinca (from Luceafărul Oradea)
—	DF	Romania	Cristian Munteanu (from Sportul Snagov)
—	DF	Romania	Tamás Szasz (from Târgu Mureș)
—	MF	Romania	Ciprian Brata (from Free agent)
—	MF	Romania	Cristian Costin (on loan from UTA Arad)
—	MF	Romania	Bogdan Miholca (from Luceafărul Oradea)
—	MF	Romania	Dumitru Muntean (from Târgu Mureș)
—	MF	France	Ayoub Saadaoui (from (France) Sedan)
—	MF	Romania	Levente Vincze (from Recolta Dorolț)
—	FW	Romania	Florin Achim (from (Israel) Hapoel Nir Ramat HaSharon)
—	FW	France	Chehyn Ben Khalifa (from (France) Beauvais)
—	FW	DR Congo	Olivier Lusamba (from (France) Épinal)
—	FW	Romania	Sergiu Jurj (on loan from CSU Craiova, previously on loan at (Italy) Verona)
—	FW	Romania	Dávid Vincze (from Recolta Dorolț)

Out:

No.	Pos.	Nation	Player
—	MF	Romania	Carlo Erdei (loan return to Pandurii Târgu Jiu)
—	MF	Romania	George Tudoran (loan return to Viitorul Constanța, later signed by Pandurii Târgu Jiu)
—	FW	Romania	Adrian Voicu (loan return to Voluntari)
—	GK	Romania	Iulian Anca-Trip (to Sportul Snagov)
—	DF	Romania	Mark Csik (to Free agent, previously on loan at Recolta Dorolț)
—	DF	Romania	Valter Heil (to (Hungary) Kazincbarcika)
—	DF	Romania	Laurențiu Moldovan (to Avântul Reghin, previously on loan at Iernut)
—	MF	Romania	Denis Chivari (on loan to Unirea Tășnad)
—	MF	Romania	Cristian Daminuță (to Free agent)
—	MF	Romania	Daniel Feier (to Știința Beltiug)
—	MF	Romania	Toni Kanaloș (to (Hungary) Kazincbarcika)
—	MF	Romania	Raul Krausz (to ASU Politehnica Timișoara)
—	MF	Romania	Mihai Onicaș (to Universitatea Cluj)
—	MF	Romania	Silviu Pană (to Dunărea Călărași)
—	MF	Romania	Iulian Roșu (to Free agent)
—	MF	France	Ayoub Saadaoui (to Free agent)
—	MF	Romania	Raul Ştef (to Free agent, previously on loan at Recolta Dorolț)
—	FW	France	Chehyn Ben Khalifa (to Free agent)
—	FW	Romania	Thomas Goț (to Gloria LT Cermei, previously on loan at Recolta Dorolț)
—	FW	Romania	Bogdan Faur (to Unirea Tășnad)
—	FW	Romania	Andrei Ludușan (to CS Iernut)
—	FW	Romania	Octavian Ursu (to Universitatea Cluj)

=== Pandurii Târgu Jiu ===
In:

No.	Pos.	Nation	Player
—	DF	Romania	Daniel Celea (loan return from Zalău)
—	DF	Romania	Daniel Ciobanu (from Brașov)
—	DF	Romania	Constantin Drugă (from Foresta Suceava)
—	DF	Romania	Sergiu Homei (from (Bulgaria) Neftochimic Burgas)
—	DF	Romania	Daniel Lung (from Foresta Suceava)
—	DF	Romania	Grigore Turda (from FC Zalău)
—	MF	Romania	Marius Cocîrlă (from Concordia Chiajna)
—	MF	Romania	Mihai Maxin (from Unirea Jucu)
—	MF	Romania	Cristian Raiciu (from Steaua II București)
—	MF	Romania	Adrian Șut (from Târgu Mureș)
—	MF	Romania	George Tudoran (from Viitorul Constanța, previously on loan at Olimpia Satu Mare)
—	FW	Romania	Vlad Bujor (from Sepsi Sfântu Gheorghe)
—	FW	Slovenia	Enis Đurković (from (Slovenia) Triglav Kranj)
—	FW	Romania	Ciprian Rus (from Târgu Mureș)

Out:

No.	Pos.	Nation	Player
—	GK	Romania	Laurențiu Popescu (loan return to CSU Craiova)
—	DF	Romania	Sorin Bușu (loan return to Râmnicu Vâlcea, later signed by Gaz Metan Mediaș)
—	DF	Nigeria	Samson Nwabueze (loan return to Râmnicu Vâlcea, later signed by Academica Clinceni)
—	DF	Romania	George Bârsănel (to Național Sebiș, previously on loan)
—	DF	Romania	Daniel Ciobanu (to Luceafărul Oradea)
—	DF	Romania	Cornel Ene (to Târgu Mureș)
—	DF	Brazil	Erico (to Astra Giurgiu)
—	DF	Romania	Florin Ilie (to Târgu Mureș)
—	DF	Netherlands	Jeffrey Ket (to (Belgium) Lommel)
—	DF	Romania	Ciprian Negoiță (to Mioveni)
—	DF	Romania	Răzvan Negrescu (to Metalurgistul Cugir)
—	DF	Romania	Cristian Sîrghi (to Gaz Metan Mediaș)
—	DF	Romania	Ionuț Tătaru (to Academica Clinceni)
—	MF	Romania	Ionuț Cioinac (to CSM Politehnica Iași)
—	MF	Romania	Marius Cioiu (to Luceafărul Oradea)
—	MF	Romania	Dragoș Firțulescu (to (Bulgaria) Beroe Stara Zagora)
—	MF	Romania	Yasin Hamed (to CFR Cluj)
—	MF	Romania	Cătălin Hlistei (to UTA Arad)
—	MF	Romania	Cosmin Mihai (to Dacia Unirea Brăila)
—	MF	Romania	Paul Păcurar (to Luceafărul Oradea)
—	MF	Romania	Adelin Pîrcălabu (to Voluntari)
—	MF	Romania	Daniel Stana (to Free agent)
—	MF	Romania	Olivian Surugiu (to Gaz Metan Mediaș)
—	FW	Romania	Paul Batin (to Concordia Chiajna)
—	FW	Romania	Daniel Cocină (to Șirineasa, previously on loan at Național Sebiș)
—	FW	Romania	Carlo Erdei (to (Hungary) Balmazújváros, previously on loan at Olimpia Satu Mare)
—	FW	Romania	Daniel Mărgărit (to Șirineasa)
—	FW	Romania	Sergiu Negruț (to (Bulgaria) Beroe Stara Zagora)

=== Ripensia Timișoara ===
In:

No.	Pos.	Nation	Player
—	DF	Romania	Andrei Dăruială (from Free agent)
—	MF	Romania	Eduard Codrean (from Poli Timișoara)
—	MF	Romania	Darius Neamțu (on loan from ASU Politehnica Timișoara)
—	MF	Romania	Laurențiu Tudor (on loan from Metalurgistul Cugir)
—	MF	Romania	Adrian Ungureanu (loan return from ASU Politehnica Timișoara)
—	FW	Romania	Denis Golda (on loan from ACS Poli Timișoara)

Out:

No.	Pos.	Nation	Player
—	GK	Romania	Raul Boboiciov (to Unirea Sânicolau Mare)
—	GK	Greece	Giorgios Gakos (to Șirineasa)
—	DF	Romania	Mădălin Grunță (to Millenium Giarmata)
—	DF	Romania	Ciprian Ștreangă (to Retired)
—	MF	Romania	Raul Briciu (to ACS Dumbrăvița)
—	MF	Romania	Claudiu Filip (to Free agent)
—	MF	Romania	Florin Nanu (to ACS Dumbrăvița)

=== Sportul Snagov ===
In:

No.	Pos.	Nation	Player
—	GK	Romania	Iulian Anca-Trip (from Olimpia Satu Mare)
—	GK	Romania	Károly Fila (from Juventus București)
—	DF	Romania	Roberto Alecsandru (from Petrolul Ploiești)
—	DF	Romania	Andrei Constantin (from Viitorul Domnești)
—	DF	Romania	Eduard Cornea (from Cetate Deva)
—	DF	Romania	Horia Crișan (from Free agent)
—	DF	Romania	Marius Halmaghe (from Voluntari)
—	DF	Romania	Viorel Lică (from Free agent)
—	DF	Romania	Ioan Șerban (from Brașov)
—	DF	Romania	Ștefan Vlădoiu (on loan from CS U Craiova)
—	DF	Romania	Andrei Voineag (from Concordia Chiajna)
—	MF	Romania	Gabriel Braga (from Tunari)
—	MF	Congo	Allan Kimbaloula (from Free agent)
—	MF	Romania	Cristian Bustea (on loan from Juventus București)
—	MF	Romania	Alin Manea (on loan from CS U Craiova)
—	MF	Romania	Dănuț Munteanu (from Știința Miroslava)
—	MF	Romania	Dragoș Penescu (from Alexandria)
—	MF	Romania	Vasile Prinoi (from Sporting Pitești)
—	FW	Romania	Leonard Dobre (from Viitorul Domnești)
—	FW	Romania	Lucian Neață (from Dinamo II București)
—	FW	Romania	Alexandru Rusu (from Free agent)

Out:

No.	Pos.	Nation	Player
—	DF	Romania	Constantin Dima (loan return to Dinamo București)
—	GK	Romania	Paul Botaș (to Voința Turnu Măgurele)
—	GK	Romania	Vlad Ignat (to Performanța Ighiu)
—	GK	Romania	Cătălin Samoilă (to Dunărea Giurgiu)
—	DF	Romania	Roberto Alecsandru (to Urban Titu)
—	DF	Romania	Mihai Ciobanu (to Free agent)
—	DF	Romania	Codruț Cioranu (to Free agent)
—	DF	Romania	Andrei Constantin (to Rapid București)
—	DF	Romania	Horia Crișan (to Știința Miroslava)
—	DF	Romania	Ovidiu Dănănae (to FCU Craiova)
—	DF	Romania	Marius Halmaghe (to Free agent)
—	DF	Romania	Valeriu Lupu (to Bolintin Malu Spart)
—	DF	Romania	Dragoș Matei (to Mostiștea Ulmu)
—	DF	Romania	Răzvan Petre (to Free agent)
—	DF	Romania	Cristian Munteanu (to Olimpia Satu Mare)
—	MF	Romania	Alexandru Dan (to Cetate Deva)
—	MF	Congo	Allan Kimbaloula (to Foresta Suceava)
—	MF	Romania	Franco Paraschiv (to Balotești)
—	MF	Romania	Alin Pătrașcu (to Balotești)
—	MF	Romania	Florian Pârvu (to Șirineasa)
—	MF	Romania	Gabriel Radicof (to AFC Odorheiu Secuiesc)
—	MF	Romania	Constantin Vasile (to Șirineasa)
—	FW	Romania	Robert Buduroi (to Afumați)
—	FW	Romania	Mihai Dina (to (Cyprus) Othellos Athienou)

=== Știința Miroslava ===
In:

No.	Pos.	Nation	Player
—	GK	Romania	Raul Avram (on loan from Botoșani)
—	GK	Romania	Jan Turiță (from CSM Pașcani)
—	DF	Romania	Ștefan Băghiceanu (from Unirea Jucu)
—	DF	Romania	Sebastian Bucur (from Afumați)
—	DF	Romania	Silviu Cerneuțanu (from CSM Politehnica Iași, previously on loan)
—	DF	Romania	Andrei Chindriș (on loan from Botoșani, previously on loan at Academica Clinceni)
—	DF	Romania	Horia Crișan (from Sportul Snagov)
—	DF	Romania	Paul Mateciuc (from Zalău)
—	MF	Romania	Robert Asăvoaei (on loan from CSM Politehnica Iași)
—	MF	Romania	Cornel Căinari (from Foresta Suceava)
—	MF	Moldova	Ion Cărăruș (from (Moldova) Zaria Bălți)
—	MF	Romania	Robert Căruță (from (North Macedonia) Bregalnica Štip)
—	MF	Romania	Alexandru Corban (on loan from Botoșani)
—	FW	Romania	Valentin Buhăcianu (from Free agent)
—	FW	Romania	Adrian Sasu (from Unirea Mircești)
—	FW	Romania	Adrian Viorică (from CSM Pașcani)

Out:

No.	Pos.	Nation	Player
—	GK	Romania	Cosmin Anton (loan return to CSM Politehnica Iași)
—	MF	Romania	Alin Huțanu (loan return to CSM Politehnica Iași, later on loan at CSM Pașcani)
—	GK	Romania	Sergiu Drăgan (on loan to CSM Pașcani)
—	DF	Romania	Eduard Dulcianu (to Free agent)
—	DF	Romania	Andu Moisi (to CSM Politehnica Iași)
—	MF	Romania	Codrin Chelaru (to Free agent)
—	MF	Romania	Marius Chelaru (loan return to CSM Politehnica Iași)
—	MF	Romania	Eduard Chiriac (to Free agent)
—	MF	Romania	Dănuț Munteanu (to Sportul Snagov)
—	FW	Romania	Mădălin Crengăniș (loan return to CSM Politehnica Iași)
—	FW	Romania	Radu Văleanu (to Free agent)

=== Târgu Mureș ===
In:

No.	Pos.	Nation	Player
—	FW	Romania	Sergiu Păcurar (loan return from Iernut)
—	GK	Romania	Florin Iacob (from Concordia Chiajna, previously on loan at Brașov)
—	DF	Romania	Robert Băjan (from Brașov)
—	DF	Romania	Cornel Ene (from Pandurii Târgu Jiu)
—	DF	Romania	Florin Ilie (from Pandurii Târgu Jiu)
—	DF	Romania	Szabolcs Kilyen (on loan from Viitorul Constanța)
—	DF	Romania	Dan Panait (on loan from Viitorul Constanța)
—	MF	Romania	Paul Iacob (on loan from Viitorul Constanța, previously on loan at Brașov)
—	MF	Argentina	Maximiliano Laso (from (Portugal) Freamunde)
—	MF	Romania	Rafael Licu (from Dunărea Călărași)
—	MF	Croatia	Luka Mijoković (from (Croatia) Cibalia)
—	MF	Romania	Dumitru Muntean (from UTA Arad)
—	MF	Romania	Alexandru Neagu (from CFR Cluj)
—	MF	Romania	Cosmin Sârbu (on loan from CFR Cluj)
—	FW	Moldova	Alexandru Boiciuc (from CSM Politehnica Iași, previously on loan at (Moldova) Milsami Orhei)
—	FW	Romania	Alexandru Stoica (on loan from Viitorul Constanța)

Out:

No.	Pos.	Nation	Player
—	DF	Romania	Sebastian Bucur (loan return to Dinamo București)
—	GK	Romania	Mirel Bolboașă (to Petrolul Ploiești)
—	GK	Romania	Florin Iacob (to Free agent)
—	GK	Romania	Eduard Pap (to Botoșani)
—	DF	Romania	Marius Constantin (to Viitorul Constanța)
—	DF	Romania	Răzvan Dulap (to CSM Școlar Reșița)
—	DF	Romania	Cornel Ene (to Free agent)
—	DF	Romania	Florin Ilie (to Free agent)
—	DF	Greece	Konstantinos Rougalas (to (Belgium) Westerlo)
—	DF	Romania	Tamás Szasz (to Olimpia Satu Mare)
—	DF	Romania	Alexandru Tudose (to Free agent)
—	DF	Spain	Javier Velayos (to Free agent)
—	MF	Romania	Andrei Sin (to CSM Politehnica Iași)
—	MF	France	Florent André (to Free agent)
—	MF	Romania	Cristian Balgiu (to Academica Clinceni)
—	MF	Romania	Emil Dică (to Național Sebiș)
—	MF	Romania	Viorel Ferfelea (to Free agent)
—	MF	Argentina	Nicolás Gorobsov (to Free agent)
—	MF	Romania	Dumitru Muntean (from Olimpia Satu Mare)
—	MF	Romania	Gabriel Mureșan (to Free agent)
—	MF	Romania	Alexandru Neagu (to Free agent)
—	MF	Romania	Bănel Nicoliță (to (Cyprus) Aris Limassol)
—	MF	Romania	Adrian Șut (to Pandurii Târgu Jiu)
—	FW	Romania	Marius Bâtfoi (to Chindia Târgoviște)
—	FW	Moldova	Alexandru Boiciuc (to Free agent)
—	FW	Romania	Andrei Ciolacu (to (Singapore) Warriors)
—	FW	Romania	Valentin Lemnaru (to Universitatea Cluj)
—	FW	Romania	Ciprian Rus (to Pandurii Târgu Jiu)
—	FW	Romania	Marvin Schieb (to Free agent)

=== UTA Arad ===
In:

No.	Pos.	Nation	Player
—	GK	Bosnia and Herzegovina	Branko Grahovac (from CSM Politehnica Iași)
—	DF	North Macedonia	Bujamin Asani (from (North Macedonia) FK Shkupi)
—	DF	Romania	Mădălin Ciucă (from CSM Politehnica Iași)
—	DF	Romania	Cristian Scutaru (from ACS Poli Timișoara)
—	MF	North Macedonia	Izet Ajrullahu (from (North Macedonia) FK Shkupi)
—	MF	Romania	Alin Buleică (from Concordia Chiajna)
—	MF	Romania	Alin Cârstocea (from Botoșani)
—	MF	Romania	Daniel Florea (from Astra Giurgiu)
—	MF	Romania	Ștefan Grigorie (from Brașov)
—	MF	Romania	Cătălin Hlistei (from Pandurii Târgu Jiu)
—	MF	Romania	Paul Păcurar (from Luceafărul Oradea)
—	FW	Romania	Dan Roman (from CFR Cluj)

Out:

No.	Pos.	Nation	Player
—	GK	Romania	Bogdan Miron (to Sepsi Sfântu Gheorghe)
—	GK	Romania	Sebastian Mara (to Retired)
—	DF	Romania	Sergiu Aldan (to Gloria LT Cermei, previously on loan)
—	DF	Romania	Bogdan Ciucifara (on loan to Voinţa Mailat)
—	DF	Romania	Ionuț Coadă (to ASU Politehnica Timișoara)
—	DF	Romania	Paul Copaci (on loan to Olimpia Satu Mare)
—	MF	Romania	Nichita Coșa (to Progresul Pecica, previously on loan at Gloria LT Cermei)
—	DF	Romania	Beniamin Cotoc (on loan to Gloria LT Cermei)
—	DF	Romania	Adrian Suslak (on loan to Gloria LT Cermei)
—	DF	Romania	Alexandru David (to AFC Hărman)
—	DF	Romania	Beniamin Gabor (to Voinţa Mailat, previously on loan)
—	DF	Romania	Alin Gligor (to Gloria LT Cermei)
—	DF	Romania	Raul Iova (on loan to CSM Școlar Reșița)
—	DF	Romania	Alexandru Lazăr (to Free agent. previously on loan at Gloria LT Cermei)
—	DF	Romania	Denis Lazăr (to Național Sebiș)
—	DF	Romania	Cătălin Morar (on loan to Șoimii Lipova)
—	DF	Romania	David Petrache (to Progresul Pecica, previously on loan at Gloria LT Cermei)
—	MF	North Macedonia	Izet Ajrullahu (to AFC Odorheiu Secuiesc)
—	MF	Romania	Cristian Andor (to Mioveni)
—	MF	Romania	Marius Chindriș (to Petrolul Ploiești)
—	MF	Romania	Damian Cociuba (to Free agent, previously on loan at Victoria Felnac)
—	MF	Romania	Dumitru Copil (to Șoimii Lipova)
—	MF	Romania	Cristian Costin (on loan to Olimpia Satu Mare)
—	MF	Romania	Darius Covaci (to Luceafărul Oradea)
—	MF	Romania	Rareș Deta (on loan to Șoimii Lipova)
—	MF	Romania	Ștefan Grigorie (to Rapid București)
—	MF	Romania	Valeriu Mager (on loan to Gloria LT Cermei)
—	MF	Romania	Ovidiu Mandache (on loan to Șoimii Lipova)
—	MF	Romania	Raul Moraru (on loan to Gloria LT Cermei)
—	MF	Romania	Dumitru Muntean (to Târgu Mureș)
—	MF	Romania	Vlad Roșu (on loan to Voinţa Mailat)
—	MF	Romania	Eduard Varga (on loan to Gloria LT Cermei, previously on loan at Voinţa Mailat)
—	MF	Romania	Claudiu Vasile (on loan to Șoimii Lipova)
—	MF	Romania	Robert Vâlceanu (loan return to Steaua București, later signed by Astra Giurgiu)
—	MF	Romania	Michel Vlad (to Free agent)
—	FW	Romania	Claudiu Adam (to Victoria Felnac, previously on loan)
—	FW	Romania	Daniel Bulza (on loan to Gloria LT Cermei, previously on loan at Iernut)
—	FW	Romania	Adrian Petre (to (Denmark) Esbjerg)
—	FW	Italy	Gianmarco Piccioni (to (Italy) Santarcangelo)
—	FW	Romania	Dan Roman (to Hermannstadt)
