= Bogdan Miron =

Bogdan Miron may refer to:

- Bogdan Ionuț Miron (born 1982), Romanian association football goalkeeper
- Bogdan Florin Miron (born 1990), Romanian association football goalkeeper
