= Octavian Popescu =

Octavian Popescu may refer to:

- Octavian Popescu (biologist)
- Octavian Popescu (footballer, born 1938)
- Octavian Popescu (footballer, born 1985)
- Octavian Popescu (footballer, born 2002)
