= Surugiu =

Surugiu, meaning "charioteer", is a Romanian surname. Notable people with the surname include:

- Florin Surugiu (born 1984), Romanian rugby union player
- Olivian Surugiu (born 1990), Romanian professional footballer
