= Mădălin Ciucă =

Romanian footballer

Personal information
- Full name: Mădălin Marius Ciucă
- Date of birth: 4 November 1982 (age 44)
- Place of birth: Craiova, Romania
- Height: 1.84 m (6 ft 0 in)
- Position: Centre back

Senior career*
Years	Team	Apps	(Gls)
2000–2005	FC Caracal	101	(8)
2005–2008	FC U Craiova	54	(5)
2008–2010	Gloria Bistrița	49	(1)
2010–2011	FC U Craiova	18	(2)
2011–2013	Gaz Metan Mediaș	29	(0)
2014	FC U Craiova	15	(1)
2014	Metalul Reșița	7	(1)
2015–2017	Politehnica Iași	56	(2)
2017	UTA Arad	13	(1)
2018	Argeș Pitești	2	(0)
2018–2019	FC U Craiova	13	(0)
Total		357	(21)

Managerial career
- 2018: FC U Craiova (assistant)
- 2019: FC U Craiova (assistant)
- * Club domestic league appearances and goals as of 24 June 2020

Mădălin Marius Ciucă (born 4 November 1982) is a Romanian former professional footballer who played as a centre back for clubs such as FC Caracal, FC U Craiova 1948 or Politehnica Iași, among others. Ciucă played in 357 matches at the level of Liga I, Liga II and Liga III.
