= Andrei Daniel Marinescu =

Romanian footballer

Andrei Marinescu
Personal information
- Date of birth: 11 February 1985 (age 41)
- Place of birth: Bucharest, Romania
- Height: 1.91 m (6 ft 3 in)
- Position: Goalkeeper

Youth career
- Rapid București

Senior career*
Years	Team	Apps	(Gls)
2006–2010	Rapid București	16	(0)
2010	Petrolul Ploiești	6	(0)
2011–2012	Alro Slatina	20	(0)
2012–2013	Turnu Severin	15	(0)
2013–2015	Brașov	4	(0)
2015–2016	Academica Clinceni	20	(0)
2016–2017	Gaz Metan Mediaș	0	(0)
2017–2018	Afumați	35	(0)
2018–2019	Sportul Snagov	17	(0)
2019–2021	Universitatea Craiova	0	(0)
- * Club domestic league appearances and goals as of 19:26, 14 June 2021 (UTC)

Andrei Daniel Marinescu (born February 11, 1985) is a Romanian football player. He plays as a goalkeeper. In his career, Marinescu also played for teams such as Rapid București, Alro Slatina, CS Turnu Severin, Academica Clinceni or CS Afumați, among others.
