= Mădălin Răileanu =

Romanian footballer

Personal information
- Date of birth: 6 May 1997 (age 29)
- Place of birth: Ploiești, Romania
- Height: 1.82 m (6 ft 0 in)
- Position: Midfielder

Team information
- Current team: Plopeni
- Number: 6

Youth career
- –2015: Astra Giurgiu

Senior career*
Years	Team	Apps	(Gls)
2015–2019	Astra Giurgiu	1	(0)
2017–2018	→ Metaloglobus București (loan)	23	(0)
2018–2019	→ Metalul Buzău (loan)	11	(3)
2019	Sportul Snagov	14	(0)
2020–2022	Blejoi	34	(2)
2022–	Plopeni	50	(7)
- * Club domestic league appearances and goals as of 19:02, 27 December 2024 (UTC)

Mădălin Răileanu (born 6 May 1997) is a Romanian professional footballer who plays as a midfielder for CSO Plopeni.

== Honours ==
=== Club ===
Astra Giurgiu

- Liga I (1): 2015–16
