= Marius Staicu =

Romanian footballer

Personal information
- Full name: Marius Cătălin Staicu
- Date of birth: 11 June 1987 (age 39)
- Place of birth: Timișoara, Romania
- Height: 1.82 m (6 ft 0 in)
- Position: Forward

Team information
- Current team: Pobeda Stár Bišnov

Senior career*
Years	Team	Apps	(Gls)
2008–2009	Calor Timișoara	?	(?)
2009–2011	Viitorul Sânandrei	?	(?)
2011–2013	Caransebeș	?	(?)
2013	CSMȘ Reșița	?	(?)
2013–2014	Metalul Reșița	11	(5)
2014	Poli Timişoara	1	(0)
2014–2015	Șoimii Pâncota	3	(0)
2015–2016	Râmnicu Vâlcea	27	(17)
2016	Gaz Metan Mediaș	4	(0)
2016–2017	Mioveni	21	(5)
2017	Politehnica Timișoara	19	(2)
2018−2019	CSMȘ Reșița	41	(26)
2019	Ripensia Timișoara	8	(0)
2020−2021	Poli Timișoara	1	(1)
2021−	Pobeda Stár Bišnov	0	(0)
- * Club domestic league appearances and goals as of 09:02, 6 October 2021 (UTC)

Marius Cătălin Staicu (born 11 June 1987) is a Romanian professional footballer who plays as a forward for Liga III side Pobeda Stár Bišnov.

== Honours ==
CSM Reșița

- Liga III: 2018–19
