= Horia Crișan =

Romanian footballer

Personal information
- Full name: Horia Alexandru Crișan
- Date of birth: 27 June 1991 (age 35)
- Place of birth: Turda, Romania
- Height: 1.93 m (6 ft 4 in)
- Position: Defender

Youth career
- 2006–2008: ȘF "Gică Popescu"
- 2008–2009: Unirea Urziceni
- 2009–2010: Gheorghe Hagi Football Academy

Senior career*
Years	Team	Apps	(Gls)
2010	Viitorul Constanța	11	(0)
2011	Brașov	0	(0)
2012	Juventus București	12	(0)
2012–2013	Putnok	28	(4)
2013–2014	Vasas	22	(1)
2014–2015	Dinamo București	2	(0)
2014	→ Fortuna Poiana Câmpina (loan)	8	(0)
2015	Kruoja Pakruojis	15	(1)
2016	Șoimii Pâncota	7	(1)
2017	Sportul Snagov	1	(0)
2017–2018	Știința Miroslava	20	(1)
2018	Speranța Nisporeni	10	(0)
2019	Odorheiu Secuiesc		
- * Club domestic league appearances and goals as of 18 March 2020

Horia Alexandru Crișan (born 27 June 1991) is a Romanian professional footballer who plays as a defender. Crișan made his Liga I debut on 27 April 2014 for Dinamo București in a 3–1 win against Concordia Chiajna. He started his career at Viitorul Constanța and also played in the Liga II for several teams: Juventus București, Fortuna Poiana Câmpina, Șoimii Pâncota or Sportul Snagov. Crișan played in Hungary for Putnok and Vasas and in Lithuania for Kruoja Pakruojis.
