= Ionuț Hlinca =

Romanian footballer (born 1988)

Personal information
- Full name: Ionuț Cristian Hlinca
- Date of birth: 5 June 1988 (age 38)
- Place of birth: Lechința, Romania
- Height: 1.87 m (6 ft 2 in)
- Position: Defender

Team information
- Current team: ACS Dumitra

Youth career
- –2006: LPS Bistriţa

Senior career*
Years	Team	Apps	(Gls)
2006–2011	Gloria Bistrița	0	(0)
2011–2012	Gaz Metan Mediaș	2	(0)
2012	Damila Măciuca	5	(0)
2013–2014	Gloria Bistrița	39	(1)
2015	Metalul Reşiţa	4	(0)
2015–2016	Brașov	14	(0)
2016–2017	Luceafărul Oradea	39	(1)
2017	Olimpia Satu Mare	14	(0)
2018–	ACS Dumitra	?	(?)
- * Club domestic league appearances and goals as of 21 March 2018

Ionuț Cristian Hlinca (born 5 June 1988) is a Romanian professional footballer who plays as a defender for Liga IV side ACS Dumitra.
