= Vasile Popa =

Romanian footballer

Personal information
- Full name: Vasile Nicolae Popa
- Date of birth: 26 April 1969 (age 57)
- Place of birth: Fălcoiu, Romania
- Height: 1.81 m (5 ft 11 in)
- Position: Centre-back

Youth career
- 1981–1986: Chimia Râmnicu Vâlcea

Senior career*
Years	Team	Apps	(Gls)
1986–1987	Chimia Râmnicu Vâlcea	3	(0)
1988–1992	Olt Scornicești (Note: The statistics for the 1990–91, 1991–92 and 1992–93 Divizia B seasons are unavailable.)	38	(3)
1993–1998	Argeș Pitești (Note: The statistics for the 1992–93 Divizia B season are unavailable.)	163	(4)
1998	Rapid București	1	(0)
1999–2003	Gloria Bistrița	132	(7)
2003–2004	Dacia Mioveni	21	(1)
2004–2005	Gloria Bistrița	25	(0)
Total		383	(15)

International career
1998	Romania	1	(0)

Managerial career
- 2014–2015: Academica Argeș (sporting director)
- 2015–2017: SCM Pitești (sporting director)
- 2017–2019: Argeș Pitești (sporting director)
- 2019–2021: Argeș Pitești (technical director)
- 2021–2025: Argeș Pitești (licence coordinator)
- * Club domestic league appearances and goals

Vasile Nicolae Popa (born 26 April 1969) is a former Romanian professional footballer who played as a Centre-back.

== International career ==
Vasile Popa played one friendly game at international level for Romania when he came as a substitute, replacing Anton Doboș in the 86th minute of a 2–1 victory against Greece.

== Personal life ==
His son, Alin Popa was also a footballer.

== Honours ==
Olt Scornicești

- Divizia C: 1990–91

Argeș Pitești

- Divizia B: 1993–94
