= Buftea =

- Town
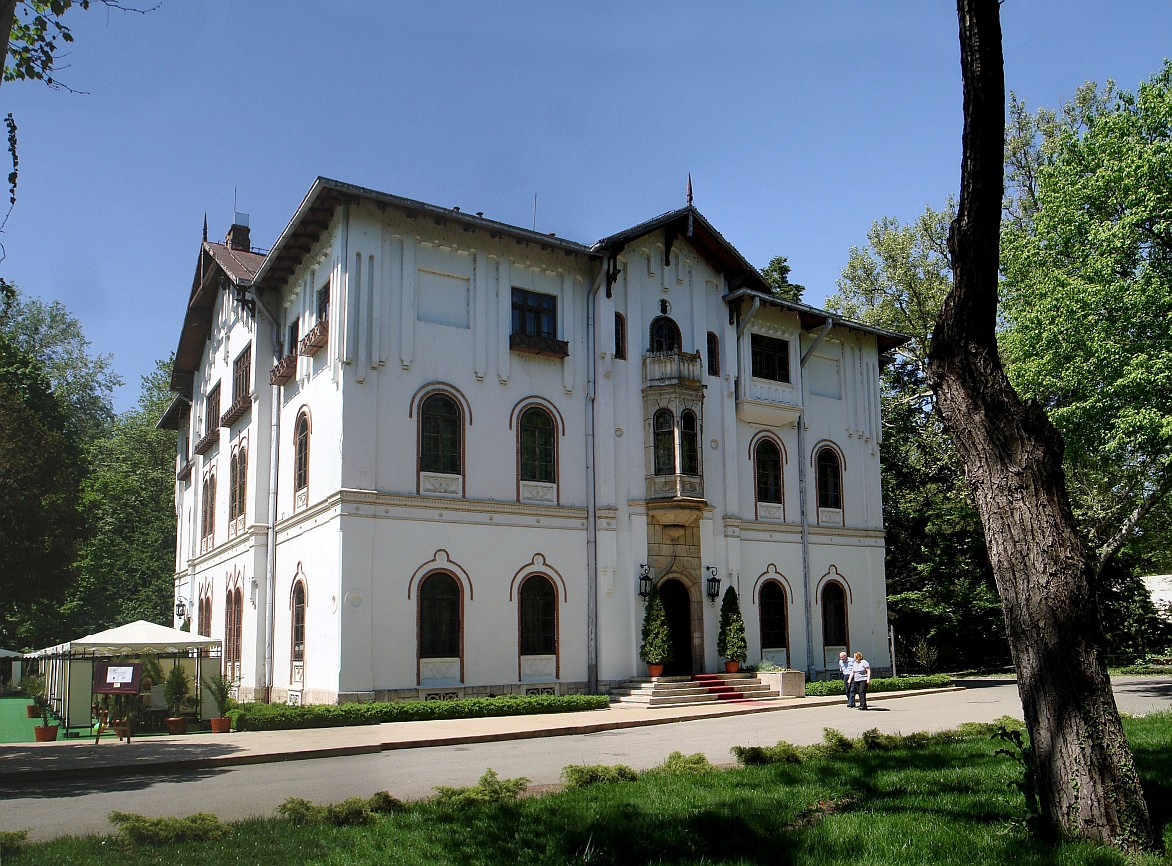
- Știrbei Palace

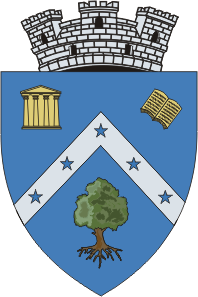
- Coat of arms

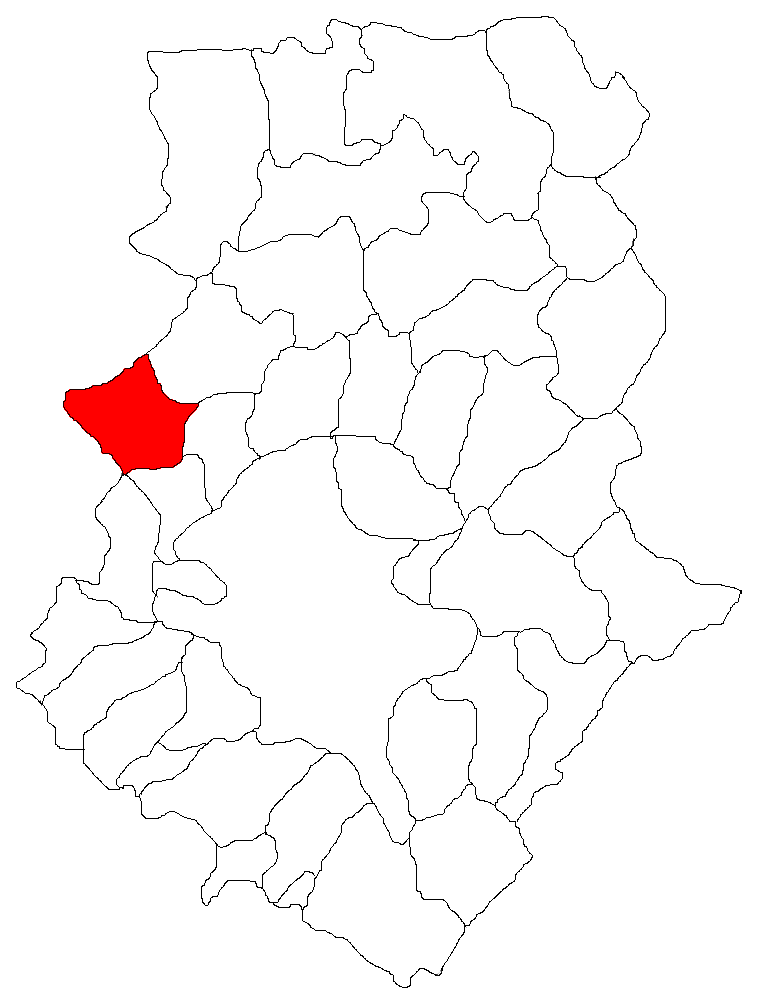
- Location in Ilfov County

- Location in Romania
- Coordinates: 44°34′12″N 25°57′0″E
- Country: Romania
- County: Ilfov

Government
  - Mayor (2024–2028): Gheorghe Pistol (PNL)
- Area: 57.36 km^{2} (22.15 sq mi)
- Elevation: 104 m (341 ft)
- Population (2021-12-01): 20,577
  - Density: 358.7/km^{2} (929.1/sq mi)
- Time zone: UTC+02:00 (EET)
  - Summer (DST): UTC+03:00 (EEST)
- Postal code: 070000
- Area code: +(40) 021
- Vehicle reg.: IF
- Website: www.primariabuftea.ro

Buftea (Romanian pronunciation: [ˈbufte̯a]) is a town in Ilfov County, Muntenia, Romania, located 20 km (12 mi) north-west of Bucharest. One village, Buciumeni, is administered by the town.

The film studios MediaPro Pictures and the Buftea Palace of the Știrbei family are located in Buftea.

Historical population
Year	Pop.	±%
1977	14,891	—
1992	19,399	+30.3%
2002	19,617	+1.1%
2011	21,960	+11.9%
2021	20,577	−6.3%
Source: Census data

== Natives ==
- Mihai Aioani (born 1999), footballer
- Marius Bâtfoi (born 1990), footballer
- Elisa Brătianu (1870–1957), aristocrat and political figure
- Alina Eremia (born 1993), singer and TV personality
- Daniela Druncea (born 1990), rowing coxswain and artistic gymnast
- Dumitru Dumitrescu (1904–1984), engineer, member of the Romanian Academy
- Nicolae Grigore (born 1983), footballer
- Constantin Lupulescu (born 1984), chess grandmaster
- Barbu Știrbey (1872–1946), Prime Minister of Romania in 1927
