= Károly Fila =

Romanian footballer

Personal information
- Date of birth: 1 January 1996 (age 30)
- Place of birth: Remetea, Romania
- Height: 1.85 m (6 ft 1 in)
- Position: Goalkeeper

Youth career
- 2006–2013: Liberty Salonta
- 2013–2014: Olimpia Satu Mare

Senior career*
Years	Team	Apps	(Gls)
2015	Șoimii Pâncota	7	(0)
2015	Baia Mare	12	(0)
2016–2017	Juventus București	21	(0)
2017	Sportul Snagov	25	(0)
2018–2020	Kazincbarcika	30	(0)
2020–2021	Minaur Baia Mare	15	(0)
2021–2022	Kazincbarcika	35	(0)
2022–2023	FC Bihor	10	(0)
2023	Satu Mare	5	(0)
2023–2024	Victoria Carei	18	(0)
2024	Diosig Bihardiószeg	13	(0)
2025	Unirea Tășnad	15	(0)
2025–2026	CA Oradea	26	(0)

International career
2012–2013	Romania U17	3	(0)
- * Club domestic league appearances and goals as of 16:36, 1 October 2026 (UTC)

Károly Fila (born 1 January 1996) is a Romanian professional footballer who plays as a goalkeeper .

== International career ==
Károly Fila played 3 matches for Romania U-17 team.
