= Codruț Cioranu =

Romanian footballer

Personal information
- Full name: Codruț Sebastian Cioranu
- Date of birth: 10 January 1991 (age 35)
- Place of birth: Bucharest, Romania
- Height: 1.80 m (5 ft 11 in)
- Position: Centre back

Youth career
- 2001–2008: Progresul

Senior career*
| Years | Team | Apps | (Gls) |
| 2008–2013 | Sportul Studențesc | 30 | (2) |
| 2013 | CSMS Iași | 1 | (0) |
| 2013–2016 | Berceni | 32 | (0) |
| 2016–2017 | Metalul Reșița | 16 | (1) |

International career^{‡}
| 2012 | Romania U-21 | 3 | (0) |
- * Club domestic league appearances and goals as of 24 July 2017 ‡ National team caps and goals as of 15 August 2012

Codruț Sebastian Cioranu (born 10 January 1991, Bucharest) is a Romanian professional footballer who plays as a centre back.
