= Ionuț Tătaru =

Romanian footballer (born 1989)

Personal information
- Date of birth: 5 October 1989 (age 37)
- Place of birth: Turceni, Romania
- Height: 1.85 m (6 ft 1 in)
- Position: Centre back

Team information
- Current team: Jiul Rovinari

Senior career*
Years	Team	Apps	(Gls)
2010	Minerul Lupeni	2	(1)
2011–2015	Pandurii Târgu Jiu	1	(0)
2013	→ Turnu Severin (loan)	10	(0)
2013	→ Râmnicu Vâlcea (loan)	5	(1)
2014–2015	→ Metalul Reșița (loan)	22	(1)
2015–2016	Olimpia Satu Mare	26	(2)
2016	Hermannstadt	9	(0)
2017	Pandurii Târgu Jiu	4	(0)
2017	Academica Clinceni	6	(0)
2018	Cetate Deva	13	(1)
2018	Metalurgistul Cugir	14	(0)
2019	Crișul Chișineu-Criș	0	(0)
2019–2020	Gilortul Târgu Cărbunești	1	(0)
2020–2021	Filiași	18	(4)
2022–	Jiul Rovinari	0	(0)
- * Club domestic league appearances and goals as of 12:01, 26 April 2022 (UTC)

Ionuț Tătaru (born 5 October 1989) is a Romanian footballer who plays as a centre back for Jiul Rovinari.
