= Sebastian Bucur =

Romanian professional footballer

Personal information
- Full name: Sebastian Ioan Bucur
- Date of birth: 10 December 1996 (age 29)
- Place of birth: Râciu, Romania
- Position: Defender

Team information
- Current team: Câmpia Râciu
- Number: 4

Youth career
- –2013: Dinamo București

Senior career*
Years	Team	Apps	(Gls)
2013–2017	Dinamo București	1	(0)
2015–2016	→ Unirea Tărlungeni (loan)	30	(1)
2016–2017	→ Târgu Mureș (loan)	4	(0)
2017	Afumați	1	(0)
2017–2019	Știința Miroslava	46	(3)
2019–2020	Odorheiu Secuiesc	12	(1)
2020–2023	Unirea Ungheni	18	(1)
2022–2023	→ Avântul Reghin (loan)	19	(1)
2023–	Câmpia Râciu	6	(0)

International career^{‡}
2013	Romania U-17	3	(0)
- * Club domestic league appearances and goals as of 16:05, 13 January 2024 (UTC) ‡ National team caps and goals as of 21 August 2016

Sebastian Bucur (born 10 December 1996) is a Romanian professional footballer who plays as a defender for AS Câmpia Râciu.
