= Daniel Ciobanu =

Romanian footballer

Personal information
- Full name: Daniel Gabriel Ciobanu
- Date of birth: 1 November 1993 (age 33)
- Place of birth: Târgu Frumos, Romania
- Height: 1.85 m (6 ft 1 in)
- Position: Defender

Youth career
- 2001–2007: LPS Iași
- 2007–2009: Steaua București

Senior career*
Years	Team	Apps	(Gls)
2009–2010	Petrolul Videle	10	(1)
2010–2013	Petrotub Roman	10	(1)
2014–2015	Farul Constanța	34	(3)
2016	Rapid CFR Suceava	4	(0)
2016–2017	FC Brașov	5	(0)
2017	Pandurii Târgu Jiu	3	(0)
2017–2018	Luceafărul Oradea	6	(0)
2018–2020	Pandurii Târgu Jiu	36	(3)
2020	Politehnica Iași	1	(0)
2020	CSM Reșița	5	(0)
2021–2022	Dacia Unirea Brăila	12	(0)
2022	Dante Botoșani	7	(0)
- * Club domestic league appearances and goals as of 06:46, 21 June 2022 (UTC)

Daniel Gabriel Ciobanu (born 1 November 1993) is a Romanian professional footballer who plays as a defender. In his career, Ciobanu also played for teams such as Farul Constanța, FC Brașov, Pandurii Târgu Jiu or Dacia Unirea Brăila, among others.

== Honours ==
=== Dante Botoșani ===
- Liga III: 2021–22
