= Andrei Trușescu =

Romanian footballer

Personal information
- Full name: Andrei George Trușescu
- Date of birth: 27 May 1999 (age 27)
- Place of birth: Pitești, Romania
- Height: 1.80 m (5 ft 11 in)
- Position: Defender

Team information
- Current team: Pandurii Târgu Jiu
- Number: 2

Youth career
- FC Dănuț Coman
- 2017–2018: Roma Primavera

Senior career*
Years	Team	Apps	(Gls)
2018–2022	Astra Giurgiu	2	(0)
2021	→ Vedița Colonești (loan)	6	(0)
2021–2022	→ Pandurii Târgu Jiu (loan)	19	(2)
2022	Muscelul Câmpulung Elite	?	(?)

International career^{‡}
2017–	Romania U19	2	(0)
- * Club domestic league appearances and goals as of 08:21, 21 June 2022 (UTC) ‡ National team caps and goals as of 19 January 2019

Andrei George Trușescu (born 27 May 1999) is a Romanian professional footballer who plays as a defender for Pandurii Târgu Jiu in the Liga III, on loan from Astra Giurgiu. Trușescu was born in Pitești, Argeș County and grew up at FC Dănuț Coman Football Academy, then played for Roma Primavera before signing its first contract as a professional footballer on 27 August 2018, with Astra Giurgiu.

== Honours ==
Astra Giurgiu

- Cupa României: Runner-up 2018–19

Vedița Colonești

- Liga III: 2020–21
