= Andu Moisi =

Romanian footballer

Personal information
- Full name: Andu Marian Moisi
- Date of birth: 12 August 1996 (age 30)
- Place of birth: Iași, Romania
- Height: 1.88 m (6 ft 2 in)
- Position: Defender

Youth career
- 2006–2010: Politehnica Iași
- 2010–2015: Politehnica Iași

Senior career*
| Years | Team | Apps | (Gls) |
| 2015–2018 | Politehnica Iași | 6 | (0) |
| 2015 | → Caransebeș (loan) | 3 | (0) |
| 2016 | → Bucovina Pojorâta (loan) | 12 | (1) |
| 2016–2017 | → Știința Miroslava (loan) | | |
| 2018 | → Știința Miroslava (loan) | 11 | (0) |
| 2018 | Național Sebiș | | |
| 2019 | Bradu Borca | 14 | (4) |
| 2019 | Ozana Târgu Neamț | 10 | (4) |
| 2020 | Aerostar Bacău | 7 | (1) |
| 2021 | Focșani | 7 | (4) |
| 2021 | SCM Zalău | 5 | (2) |
- * Club domestic league appearances and goals as of 12:37, 4 February 2022 (UTC)

Andu Marian Moisi (born 12 August 1996) is a Romanian professional footballer who plays as a defender.

== Club career ==
=== Politehnica Iași ===
In the summer of 2017, after helping CS Știința Miroslava secure promotion to the Romanian Liga II, Moisi returned to Politehnica Iași . He subsequently signed a new three-year contract with the Liga I club.

== Honours ==
=== Știința Miroslava ===
- Liga III: 2016–17
