= Alexandru Cătălin Neagu =

Romanian footballer

Alexandru Neagu
Personal information
- Full name: Alexandru Cătălin Neagu
- Date of birth: 26 January 1993 (age 33)
- Place of birth: Pitești, Romania
- Height: 1.78 m (5 ft 10 in)
- Position: Midfielder

Team information
- Current team: Unirea Bascov (assistant)

Youth career
- 2002–2010: Argeș Pitești
- 2010–2012: Real Murcia

Senior career*
Years	Team	Apps	(Gls)
2012–2015	Pandurii Târgu Jiu	4	(0)
2012–2013	→ UTA Arad (loan)	1	(0)
2013	→ Râmnicu Vâlcea (loan)	7	(0)
2014	→ Mioveni (loan)	0	(0)
2014–2015	SCM Pitești		
2015–2016	Academica Clinceni	32	(11)
2016–2017	CFR Cluj	3	(0)
2017	ASA Târgu Mureș	2	(1)
2018–2019	Mioveni	21	(0)
2019	Metaloglobus București	9	(0)
2019–2021	Ripensia Timișoara	38	(6)
2022–2023	Slatina	4	(0)
2023–2024	Unirea Bascov	12	(1)
Total		133	(19)

International career
2011–2012	Romania U-19	7	(2)
2013	Romania U-21	2	(0)

Managerial career
- 2024–: Unirea Bascov (assistant)
- * Club domestic league appearances and goals as of 10:58, 8 December 2024 (UTC)

Alexandru Cătălin Neagu (born 26 January 1993) is a Romanian former professional footballer who played as a midfielder for teams such as Pandurii Târgu Jiu, Academica Clinceni, CS Mioveni or Ripensia Timișoara, among others.

Neagu started playing professional football for FC Argeș Pitești; from there he was transferred to Real Murcia, in Segunda División.

Neagu started his career in Liga I (Romania) playing two years for Pandurii Târgu Jiu, where he was loaned to different teams before finally joining CFR Cluj on 27 July 2016.

== Honours ==
CSM Slatina

- Liga III: 2021–22
