= Cosmin Sârbu =

Romanian footballer

Personal information
- Full name: Cosmin Petrișor Sârbu
- Date of birth: 29 March 1996 (age 30)
- Place of birth: Moldova Nouă, Romania
- Height: 1.79 m (5 ft 10 in)
- Positions: Midfielder; forward

Youth career
- 2006–2013: Liberty Salonta
- 2013–2014: Bihor Oradea

Senior career*
Years	Team	Apps	(Gls)
2014–2015	Bihor Oradea	1	(0)
2015–2016	FCM Baia Mare	31	(7)
2016–2019	CFR Cluj	3	(0)
2017	→ Târgu Mureș (loan)	19	(11)
2018–2019	CFR II Cluj	12	(8)
2019	Concordia Chiajna	0	(0)
2019	Sânmartin	5	(0)
2020	Ripensia Timișoara	5	(1)
2021	Sânmartin	6	(2)
2022–2023	Lotus Băile Felix	28	(2)
Total		110	(31)
- * Club domestic league appearances and goals as of 10:26, 13 July 2023 (UTC)

Cosmin Petrișor Sârbu (born 29 March 1996) is a Romanian professional footballer who plays as a midfielder or forward.

== Career ==
=== Liberty Salonta ===
Sârbu started his career at Liberty Salonta Football Academy. He played almost all his youth career at Salonta until 2013 when the youth center was dissolved.

=== Bihor Oradea ===
After the dissolution of Liberty Salonta he signed with Bihor Oradea, the most important club of Bihor County. There, he played one year at youth level then on 28 November 2014 he made his debut in Liga II in a match against CS Mioveni.

=== FCM Baia Mare ===
In 2015, Sârbu signed with FCM Baia Mare and in one season at Liga II he played 31 matches and scored 7 goals, being one of the best players of the team.

=== CFR Cluj ===
After being close to sign with Rapid București he signed with CFR Cluj in the summer of 2016 and made his debut in Liga I on 5 March 2017 in a match against Viitorul Constanța.
