= Alin Popa =

Romanian footballer

Personal information
- Full name: Alin Nicușor Popa
- Date of birth: 1 January 1991 (age 35)
- Place of birth: Caracal, Romania
- Height: 1.86 m (6 ft 1 in)
- Positions: Midfielder; forward

Team information
- Current team: Real Bradu

Youth career
- 1998–2005: CSȘ Aripi Pitești
- 2005–2008: Argeș Pitești

Senior career*
Years	Team	Apps	(Gls)
2008–2013	Argeș Pitești	101	(23)
2008	→ Argeș II Pitești	4	(1)
2009	→ Dacia Mioveni (loan)	7	(0)
2013–2017	Mioveni	75	(11)
2017–2021	Argeș Pitești	38	(2)
2021	Vedița Colonești	11	(1)
2022–	Real Bradu	0	(0)

International career^{‡}
2010	Romania U-19	2	(0)
- * Club domestic league appearances and goals as of 13:10, 8 April 2022 (UTC) ‡ National team caps and goals as of 12 March 2018

Alin Nicușor Popa (born 1 January 1991) is a Romanian professional footballer who plays as a midfielder or forward for Real Bradu. Born in Caracal but grew up in Pitești, at Argeș Pitești academy, Popa played all his career for the two main teams of Argeș County, Argeș Pitești and Mioveni having played more than 100 matches for the white-violet eagles and more than 80 for the yellow and greens. His father, Vasile Popa was also a footballer.
