= Naoufal Boumina =

Belgian footballer

Personal information
- Date of birth: 15 November 1993 (age 32)
- Place of birth: Belgium
- Positions: Midfielder; winger; forward

Senior career*
Years	Team	Apps	(Gls)
-2011/12	A.F.C. Tubize	0	(0)
2012/2013	R. Charleroi S.C.	0	(0)
2013/2014	Getafe CF	0	(0)
2014/2015	Atlético Madrid	0	(0)
2014/2015	R. Charleroi S.C.	0	(0)
2015/16-2016/17	K.R.C. Mechelen	2+	(0+)
2017	Wydad AC		
2017/2018	ACS Foresta Suceava	6	(0)
2019/20-	KF Vushtrria		
- * Club domestic league appearances and goals

Naoufal Boumina (born 15 November 1993 in Belgium) is a Belgian footballer.

== Career ==
Boumina left Charleroi because of his coach, who he claimed was racist. After that, he played for the reserves of Getafe and Atletico Madrid in Spain, training with the first team on one occasion. In 2017, Boumina signed for Wydad Casabalanca, the most successful club in Morocco, where he won the league and CAF Champions League. Afterwards, he would say Wydad was the highlight of his career.
