= Adelin Voinescu =

Romanian professional footballer

Personal information
- Full name: Adelin Valentin Voinescu
- Date of birth: 1 April 1998 (age 28)
- Place of birth: Pitești, Romania
- Height: 1.81 m (5 ft 11 in)
- Position: Forward

Youth career
- 2008–2013: Argeș Pitești
- 2013–2014: Școala de Fotbal Nicolae Dobrin
- 2014-2015: SCM Arges Pitesti

Senior career*
Years	Team	Apps	(Gls)
2015–2018	SCM Pitești	16	(7)
2016–2017	→ Atletic Bradu (loan)	18	(8)
2017–2018	→ Național Sebiș (loan)	8	(3)
2018	Mioveni II	11	(4)
2018	Unirea Bascov	10	(4)
2019	Atletic Bradu	12	(12)
2019–2021	Voluntari II	15	(6)
2020–2021	Voluntari	3	(0)
2021	Dacia Unirea Brăila	10	(0)
2022–2023	Real Bradu	32	(21)
2023–2024	Vedița Colonești	27	(17)
- * Club domestic league appearances and goals as of 12:59, 21 December 2024 (UTC)

Adelin Valentin Voinescu (born 1 April 1998) is a Romanian professional footballer who plays as a forward. In his career, Voinescu played mostly at the level of Liga III, for teams such SCM Pitesti( FC Argeș Pitești ), FC Voluntari II, Atletic Bradu,CS Vedița Colonești Național Sebiș or Unirea Bascov.Voinescu played in the Romanian First League for Voluntari, and in the Second League for AFC Dacia Unirea Brăila
