= Răzvan Negrescu =

Romanian footballer

Personal information
- Full name: Răzvan Marian Negrescu
- Date of birth: 9 August 1995 (age 31)
- Place of birth: Târgu Jiu, Romania
- Height: 1.83 m (6 ft 0 in)
- Position: Defender

Youth career
- Pandurii Târgu Jiu

Senior career*
Years	Team	Apps	(Gls)
2013–2017	Pandurii Târgu Jiu	1	(0)
2014–2016	→ Pandurii II Târgu Jiu		
2016	→ Metalurgistul Cugir (loan)		
2017–2018	Metalurgistul Cugir		
- * Club domestic league appearances and goals as of 20 July 2018

Răzvan Marian Negrescu (born 9 August 1995) is a Romanian professional footballer who plays as a defender.
