= Alin Ignea =

Romanian footballer

Personal information
- Full name: Alin Liviu Ignea
- Date of birth: 28 April 1989 (age 37)
- Place of birth: Timișoara, Romania
- Height: 1.77 m (5 ft 10 in)
- Position: Midfielder

Youth career
- –2007: Auto Timișoara

Senior career*
Years	Team	Apps	(Gls)
2007–2009	Timișul Albina		
2009–2010	Național Sebiș		
2010–2012	UTA Arad	47	(3)
2012–2013	Pandurii Târgu Jiu	1	(0)
2013	→ Botoșani (loan)	8	(0)
2013–2015	Olt Slatina	52	(6)
2015–2016	FCM Baia Mare	30	(3)
2016–2017	ACS Poli Timișoara	2	(0)
2017–2023	ASU Politehnica Timișoara	141	(22)
2023–2025	Peciu Nou	38	(12)
2025	Dumbrăvița	9	(2)

Managerial career
- 2021–2023: ASU Politehnica Timișoara (player/assistant)
- * Club domestic league appearances and goals as of 10 May 2025

Alin Liviu Ignea (born 28 April 1989) is a Romanian professional footballer who plays as a midfielder.

== Honours ==
Botoșani

- Liga II: 2012–13

ACS Poli Timișoara

- Cupa Ligii runner-up: 2016–17
