= Constantin Drugă =

Romanian footballer

Personal information
- Full name: Constantin Dudu Drugă
- Date of birth: 27 February 1990 (age 36)
- Place of birth: Roman, Romania
- Height: 1.86 m (6 ft 1 in)
- Position: Defender

Team information
- Current team: FC Bacău
- Number: 23

Youth career
- Laminorul Roman

Senior career*
| Years | Team | Apps | (Gls) |
| 2006–2011 | Petrotub Roman | | |
| 2011–2012 | Ceahlăul Piatra Neamț | 6 | (0) |
| 2013 | Farul Constanța | 4 | (0) |
| 2013 | Botoșani | 0 | (0) |
| 2014 | Petrotub Roman | | |
| 2015–2016 | SC Bacău | 37 | (2) |
| 2016–2017 | Foresta Suceava | 29 | (1) |
| 2017 | Pandurii Târgu Jiu | 19 | (0) |
| 2018 | Energeticianul | 12 | (0) |
| 2019 | Aerostar Bacău | 9 | (1) |
| 2019–2021 | Foresta Suceava | 33 | (11) |
| 2021–2022 | Dante Botoșani | 24 | (2) |
| 2022 | Ceahlăul Piatra Neamț | 9 | (0) |
| 2023 | Dinamo Bacău | 12 | (7) |
| 2023– | FC Bacău | 24 | (5) |
- * Club domestic league appearances and goals as of 12:53, 31 December 2024 (UTC)

Constantin Dudu Drugă (born 27 February 1990) is a Romanian professional footballer who plays as a defender for FC Bacău.

== Honours ==
=== Dante Botoșani ===
- Liga III: 2021–22
