= Marian Târșa =

Romanian footballer

Personal information
- Date of birth: 16 April 1998 (age 28)
- Place of birth: Vaslui, Romania
- Height: 1.75 m (5 ft 9 in)
- Position: Midfielder

Team information
- Current team: ACS FC Dinamo
- Number: 8

Youth career
- –2016: Politehnica Iași

Senior career*
Years	Team	Apps	(Gls)
2016–2017	Politehnica Iași	7	(1)
2017–2021	Botoșani	12	(0)
2018	→ Academica Clinceni (loan)	11	(1)
2021–2022	Politehnica Iași	7	(0)
2022	Vedița Colonești	12	(1)
2022–2023	Metalul Buzău	13	(2)
2023	Politehnica Timișoara	7	(0)
2023	Rapid Brodoc	13	(3)
2024	CSU Alba Iulia	12	(2)
2024–	ACS FC Dinamo	13	(0)
- * Club domestic league appearances and goals as of 14:07, 27 December 2024 (UTC)

Marian Târșa (born 16 April 1998) is a Romanian professional footballer who plays as a midfielder for Liga III side ACS FC Dinamo.
