= Paul Păcurar =

Romanian footballer

Personal information
- Date of birth: 5 March 1991 (age 35)
- Place of birth: Alba Iulia, Romania
- Height: 1.76 m (5 ft 9 in)
- Position: Midfielder

Team information
- Current team: Metalurgistul Cugir
- Number: 10

Senior career*
Years	Team	Apps	(Gls)
2012–2013	Botoșani	10	(0)
2013–2014	Șoimii Pâncota	?	(?)
2014	Industria Galda	?	(?)
2015	Sighetu Marmației	?	(?)
2015–2016	Baia Mare	29	(3)
2016	Luceafărul Oradea	16	(6)
2017	Pandurii Târgu Jiu	13	(2)
2017	Gaz Metan Mediaș	0	(0)
2017	Luceafărul Oradea	4	(0)
2017	UTA Arad	14	(1)
2018	Unirea Alba Iulia	8	(1)
2019–	Metalurgistul Cugir	128	(16)
- * Club domestic league appearances and goals as of 12:25, 25 December 2024 (UTC)

Paul Păcurar (born 5 March 1991) is a Romanian professional footballer who plays as a midfielder for Liga III side Metalurgistul Cugir.

== Honours ==
CSO Cugir

- Liga III: 2020–21
