= Andrei Nilă =

Romanian footballer

Personal information
- Date of birth: 16 August 1985 (age 41)
- Place of birth: Vatra Dornei, Romania
- Height: 1.79 m (5 ft 10 in)
- Position: Forward

Team information
- Current team: Zimbrii Lerești

Youth career
- Argeș Pitești

Senior career*
Years	Team	Apps	(Gls)
2003–2007	Dacia Mioveni	23	(1)
2006–2007	Building Vânju Mare	16	(0)
2008–2012	Mioveni	39	(4)
2008–2009	→ Muscelul Câmpulung (loan)	?	(?)
2012–2014	SCM Pitești	18	(5)
2014–2017	Mioveni	67	(11)
2017–2019	Argeș Pitești	48	(9)
2019	Vedița Colonești	10	(2)
2022–2023	ARO Câmpulung	35	(25)
2023–	Zimbrii Lerești	12	(13)
- * Club domestic league appearances and goals as of 00:19, 14 January 2024 (UTC)

Andrei Nilă (born 16 August 1985) is a Romanian former professional footballer who played as a forward for Zimbrii Lerești. Born in Vatra Dornei, Nilă grew up at the academy of Argeș Pitești and played most of his career for Mioveni and Argeș Pitești, with short periods spent at Building Vânju Mare and Muscelul Câmpulung. Nilă made his Liga I debut on 22 July 2011 for Mioveni in a 0-1 defeat against Universitatea Cluj.
