= Alexandru Corban =

Romanian association football player

Personal information
- Date of birth: 29 January 1998 (age 28)
- Place of birth: Comănești, Romania
- Height: 1.80 m (5 ft 11 in)
- Position: Midfielder

Youth career
- –2014: Moinești

Senior career*
Years	Team	Apps	(Gls)
2014–2015	Moinești		
2015–2016	SC Bacău	24	(2)
2016–2019	Botoșani	4	(0)
2017–2018	→ Știința Miroslava (loan)	27	(1)
2020–2021	Aerostar Bacău	9	(0)
2021–2022	Dante Botoșani	19	(2)
2022–2024	CSM Bacău	50	(16)
2024–2026	FC Bacău	12	(2)

International career
2016	Romania U18	1	(0)
- * Club domestic league appearances and goals as of 5 September 2025

Alexandru Corban (born 29 January 1998) is a Romanian professional footballer who plays as a midfielder.

== Honours ==
Aerostar Bacău

- Liga III: 2019–20

Dante Botoșani

- Liga III: 2021–22

FC Bacău

- Liga III: 2024–25
