= Robert Boboc =

Romanian professional footballer

Personal information
- Full name: Robert Florin Boboc
- Date of birth: 27 May 1995 (age 31)
- Place of birth: Pitești, Romania
- Height: 1.79 m (5 ft 10 in)
- Position: Midfielder

Team information
- Current team: 1599 Șelimbăr
- Number: 15

Youth career
- 2004–2010: Argeș Pitești
- 2009–2010: Școala de Fotbal Nicolae Dobrin
- 2010–2012: Școala de Fotbal Dănuț Coman

Senior career*
Years	Team	Apps	(Gls)
2012–2014	Mioveni	20	(0)
2014	→ Universitatea Cluj (loan)	1	(0)
2014–2016	Universitatea Cluj	30	(1)
2014–2015	→ SCM Pitești (loan)		
2016–2017	Mioveni	18	(0)
2017–2021	Astra Giurgiu	1	(0)
2017	→ Mioveni (loan)	8	(0)
2017–2018	→ Hermannstadt (loan)	27	(0)
2019	→ Mioveni (loan)	16	(1)
2019–2020	→ Dunărea Călărași (loan)	18	(0)
2020–2021	→ CSM Reșița (loan)	18	(0)
2021–2023	1599 Șelimbăr	33	(1)
2023	FC Brașov	1	(0)
2023–2024	Argeș Pitești	13	(0)
2024–	1599 Șelimbăr	56	(1)

International career
2013	Romania U18	1	(0)
- * Club domestic league appearances and goals as of 31 October 2026

Robert Florin Boboc (born 27 May 1995) is a Romanian professional footballer who plays as a midfielder for Liga II club 1599 Șelimbăr.

== Club career ==
Boboc was formed as a player at the best academies from Pitești: Argeș Pitești, Nicolae Dobrin Football Academy and Dănuț Coman Football Academy. At senior level he played for Mioveni, Universitatea Cluj, Argeș Pitești and Hermannstadt. He made his Liga I debut on 16 May 2015 for Universitatea Cluj in a 0-0 draw against FC Brașov.

== Honours ==
Hermannstadt

- Cupa României runner-up: 2017–18
