= George Tudoran =

Romanian footballer

Personal information
- Full name: George Mădălin Tudoran
- Date of birth: 13 January 1996 (age 30)
- Place of birth: Târgu Jiu, Romania
- Height: 1.80 m (5 ft 11 in)
- Position: Right midfielder

Team information
- Current team: Cetatea Turnu Măgurele
- Number: 10

Youth career
- Pandurii Târgu Jiu
- –2014: Gheorghe Hagi Academy

Senior career*
Years	Team	Apps	(Gls)
2014–2017	Viitorul Constanța	0	(0)
2015–2016	→ Rapid București (loan)	30	(3)
2016–2017	→ Olimpia Satu Mare (loan)	10	(3)
2017–2019	Pandurii Târgu Jiu	54	(18)
2019	Rapid București	0	(0)
2019–2021	Dunărea Călărași	32	(4)
2021	Metaloglobus București	5	(0)
2022	Viitorul Târgu Jiu	5	(0)
2022	Politehnica Timișoara	4	(0)
2023	Viitorul Șimian	9	(0)
2023	Politehnica Timișoara	6	(0)
2024	SR Brașov	11	(1)
2024–	Cetatea Turnu Măgurele	9	(0)
- * Club domestic league appearances and goals as of 20:23, 22 December 2024 (UTC)

George Tudoran is a Romanian professional footballer who plays as a centre midfielder for Cetatea Turnu Măgurele.

== Club career ==
Tudoran made his professional debut playing for Rapid București on 29 August 2015 in a match against CS Balotești. He scored a goal in his debut.

== Honours ==
Rapid București

- Liga II: 2015–16
