= Marius Bâtfoi =

Romanian footballer

Personal information
- Full name: Marius Cornel Bâtfoi
- Date of birth: 29 May 1990 (age 36)
- Place of birth: Buftea, Romania
- Height: 1.86 m (6 ft 1 in)
- Position: Striker

Senior career*
| Years | Team | Apps | (Gls) |
| 2009–2011 | Steaua II București | 42 | (7) |
| 2007–2009 | → Dunarea Giurgiu (loan) | 17 | (3) |
| 2010–2011 | → Unirea Urziceni (loan) | 4 | (0) |
| 2011–2012 | Snagov | 13 | (2) |
| 2012 | Otopeni | 5 | (0) |
| 2012–2013 | Buftea | 21 | (5) |
| 2013–2014 | Dunărea Galați | 27 | (10) |
| 2017 | Balotești | 49 | (13) |
| 2017 | Târgu Mureș | 9 | (0) |
| | Chindia Târgoviște | 15 | (1) |
| 2018 | Steaua București | | |
| 2018–2019 | Tunari | | |
- * Club domestic league appearances and goals as of 16 January 2018

Marius Bâtfoi (born 29 May 1990 in Buftea, Romania) is a Romanian football player who plays as a striker.

== Career ==
While playing for Steaua II București, Marius was loaned out to Unirea Urziceni. He made his Liga I debut on 11 September 2010, in a match against Steaua București, coming off the bench to replace Apostol Muzac in the 90th minute.
