= Radu Motreanu =

Romanian footballer

Personal information
- Date of birth: 22 June 1998 (age 28)
- Place of birth: Timișoara, Romania
- Height: 1.73 m (5 ft 8 in)
- Position: Defender

Youth career
- –2015: ACS Poli Timișoara

Senior career*
Years	Team	Apps	(Gls)
2015–2020	Poli Timișoara	17	(0)
2015–2016	→ NMM Becicherecu Mic (loan)	?	(?)
2016–2018	→ ASU Politehnica (loan)	62	(0)
2019–2020	→ ASU Politehnica (loan)	11	(0)
2020–2021	Dumbrăvița	20	(0)

International career^{‡}
2014	Romania U-17	3	(1)
- * Club domestic league appearances and goals as of 13:51, 12 April 2022 (UTC) ‡ National team caps and goals as of 12 March 2018

Radu Motreanu (born 22 June 1998) is a Romanian professional footballer who plays as a defender. He played for the Romania U-17 team between 2012 and 2016.

== Early life ==
Radu Motreanu was born and raised in Timișoara, Timiș County of Romania. He is the only son of Dana Motreanu (b. 1968). He began his football career as a junior at Poli Timișoara at an early age and grew up inside the team until he was moved to the senior team in 2015. He attended the local Sports High-School of Timișoara where he graduated in 2017. He is currently a student at the West University of Timișoara in Sports specialization. He is a good friend of the Romanian gymnast Diana Bulimar.
