= Olivian Surugiu =

Romanian footballer

Personal information
- Full name: Olivian Laurențiu Surugiu
- Date of birth: 28 February 1990 (age 36)
- Place of birth: Craiova, Romania
- Height: 1.71 m (5 ft 7 in)
- Position: Midfielder

Youth career
- –2005: ȘF "Gică Popescu"
- 2005–2009: FC U Craiova

Senior career*
Years	Team	Apps	(Gls)
2009	Primăvara Craiova	16	(0)
2010	Gaz Metan CFR Craiova	22	(2)
2011	FC U Craiova	3	(0)
2011	ALRO Slatina	6	(0)
2012	Petrolul Ploiești	1	(0)
2012–2013	Râmnicu Vâlcea	6	(1)
2013–2014	UTA Arad	14	(1)
2014–2015	Podari	?	(?)
2015–2017	Universitatea Craiova	6	(0)
2015–2016	→ Universitatea II Craiova	?	(?)
2017	Pandurii Târgu Jiu	14	(2)
2017	Gaz Metan Mediaș	4	(0)
2018	Hermannstadt	3	(0)
2018	FC U Craiova	6	(0)
- * Club domestic league appearances and goals as of 20 June 2018

Olivian Laurențiu Surugiu (born 28 February 1990) is a Romanian professional footballer who plays as a midfielder.

== Honours ==
Hermannstadt

- Cupa României: Runner-up 2017–18
