= Bogdan Florin Miron =

Romanian footballer

Bogdan Miron
Personal information
- Full name: Bogdan Florin Miron
- Date of birth: 17 March 1990 (age 36)
- Place of birth: Satu Mare, Romania
- Height: 1.91 m (6 ft 3 in)
- Position: Goalkeeper

Team information
- Current team: Satu Mare
- Number: 1

Youth career
- 2000–2006: LPS Satu Mare
- 2006–2007: Someșul Satu Mare
- 2007: FC Porto Juniors

Senior career*
Years	Team	Apps	(Gls)
2008–2009	Olimpia Satu Mare	?	(?)
2010	Silvania Șimleu Silvaniei	13	(0)
2011–2013	Luceafărul Oradea	33	(0)
2013	→ Olimpia Satu Mare (loan)	?	(?)
2013–2014	Olimpia Satu Mare	6	(0)
2014–2015	Național Sebiș	?	(?)
2015–2017	UTA Arad	64	(0)
2017	Sepsi OSK	3	(0)
2018	Energeticianul	16	(0)
2019	Cigánd	13	(0)
2020–2024	SCM Zalău	54	(0)
2024–	Satu Mare	0	(0)

Managerial career
- 2022–2024: SCM Zalău (GK Coach)
- * Club domestic league appearances and goals as of 10:51, 30 October 2024 (UTC)

Bogdan Florin Miron (born 17 March 1990) is a Romanian professional footballer who plays as a goalkeeper for CSM Olimpia Satu Mare.
