= Octavian Popescu (footballer, born 1985) =

Romanian footballer

Personal information
- Full name: Octavian Alexandru Popescu
- Date of birth: 5 November 1985 (age 41)
- Place of birth: Pitești, Romania
- Height: 1.89 m (6 ft 2 in)
- Position: Goalkeeper

Senior career*
Years	Team	Apps	(Gls)
2004–2005	Inter Curtea de Argeș	0	(0)
2005–2006	Buftea		
2006–2009	Unirea Alba Iulia	0	(0)
2006–2008	→ Sporting Roșiori (loan)		
2008	→ Muscelul Câmpulung (loan)		
2009	→ Minerul Mehedinți (loan)		
2009–2017	Mioveni	117	(0)
2017–2019	Argeș Pitești	32	(0)
Total		149	(0)
- * Club domestic league appearances and goals as of 14:01, 15 June 2021 (UTC)

Octavian Alexandru Popescu (born 5 November 1985) is a Romanian former professional footballer who played as a goalkeeper, mainly for CS Mioveni and FC Argeș Pitești. First match Liga I was played for CS Mioveni, against ASA 2013 Târgu Mureș.
