= CS Sportul Snagov =

Romanian professional football club

Sportul Snagov
- Full name: Club Sportiv Sportul Snagov
- Short name: Snagov
- Founded: 2007 as Damila Măciuca
- Dissolved: 2020
- Ground: Voința
- Capacity: 2,000
Home colours	Away colours

Club Sportiv Sportul Snagov, commonly known as Sportul Snagov or simply as Snagov, was a Romanian professional football club from Snagov, Ilfov County, founded in 2007 as Damila Măciuca and dissolved in 2020. Last time the club played in the Liga II, the second-tier in the Romanian football system, but withdrew during the winter-break of the 2019–20 season, due to financial problems.

== History ==
=== Damila Măciuca (2007–2013) ===
The club was founded as Damila Măciuca in the summer of 2007, the colours were white and green and the squad was enrolled in the Liga IV, Vâlcea County series. The owner of the club was Daniel Nițu, businessman who owns Damila SRL, a company with an over 60 million€ fiscal value in 2016 and one of the largest distributors of metallurgical products and construction materials in the south of Romania. Damila won Vâlcea County series and qualified for the Liga III promotion play-off where they played against Recolta Stoicănești, Olt County champions. The match was held on the Extensiv Stadium from Craiova and was won with 1–0 by Damila. Damila made a great Liga III season and finished on the 1st place in the 4th series, at 6 points from the 2nd place, occupied by Minerul Motru, promoting to the Liga II.

With Erik Lincar, then changed by Claudiu Niculescu in the technical leadership of the team, Damila has made a season far beyond expectations, even sensational, finishing on the 3rd place in the second series of the Liga II at only one point from a promotion place.

In the summer of 2013 after the over average performance of the team and also the ranking that was with 3 places and 10 points over CSM Râmnicu Vâlcea, county's first team, appeared the idea that Damila should be the new team of the city of Râmnicu Vâlcea. After several rounds of negotiations Daniel Nițu (Damila's owner) and Cătălin Rufă (CSM's owner) changed the camps, so Rufă became the new owner of the white and greens and also the squads were changed between them.

=== Metalul Reșița (2013–2017) ===
Former logo, as Metalul Reșița.

After the transaction Rufă has received the financial support of the Reșița Municipality, with the condition that the club must change its name, headquarters, colors and stadium. So in the summer of 2013 Damila Măciuca was renamed as CSM Metalul Reșița, moved from Măciuca to Reșița, their colors were changed from white and green in red and black, the traditional colours of Reșița and the Damila Stadium has been replaced by Mircea Chivu Stadium. Financially supported by Reșița Municipality and Cătălin Rufă, with Alexandru Pelici, then changed by Marian Pană as coaches and Daniel Oprița at his last season as a player Metalul ended the regular season on the 2nd place, a promotional one, but failed to promote in the play-off when the new team from Valea Domanului, ended only on the 4th place.

In the 2014–15 Liga II season, this time with Oprița as a coach Metalul made a new great season and finished on the 3rd place.

Though sustained at first by Guardia Rosso-Nera, CSM Școlar Reșița supporters, club that was at that time in a hard financial situation, the relationship between the owner and the supporters chilled subsequently and they went back to supporting their original club, CSM. Also in the summer of 2015 the relations between Reșița Municipality and Cătălin Rufă have become increasingly distant.

In the 2015–16 Liga II season Metalul had major financial problems, many teams entering on the pitch with the banner: "Respect, Reșița!", campaign appeared after Metalul players refused to enter on the pitch at the match against Olimpia Satu Mare, the reason being the non-payment of wages. The situation has improved further, but the team finished the championship on the last place, with an incredible −10 points in the league table, as a result of the deductions due to the financial problems. The more incredible it would be that the team remained in the second league also for the next season, due to lack of competitors, also the club recorded the biggest defeat of the season, 2–11 against FC Brașov.

2016–17 season was again one of survival for the team owned now only by Cătălin Rufă. In the summer of 2016 Snagov Commune was interested in supporting the team, of course there was a new move in the business, this time from Reșița to Snagov. As the agreement was signed pretty late, Metalul could not change its name and headquarters, so Snagov Commune could not support financially the new team. With a very young squad, completed during the winter break with some experienced players, Metalul finished on the 16th place, with 21 points this time, but in fact was the last, all the teams from 17th to 20th place being dissolved or excluded.

=== Sportul Snagov (2017–present) ===
A new last moment rescue came in the summer of 2017 when FC Brașov went bankrupt, leaving a vacant place in the second league table, again occupied by Metalul. The club also changed its name again, this time from CSM Metalul Reșița to CS Sportul Snagov and their colors were changed from red and black in red and blue.

With the financial support of Snagov Commune, with a squad changed from its roots and with Valeriu Răchită as the new coach, the new Sportul was an enigma for almost everyone. In the first round the red and blues made a 1–1 draw at Oradea, against Luceafărul, a team with promotion claims at that time, and the good form continued, the team was settling somewhere in the middle of the table and turned out to be a strong opponent for many teams.

On 31 January 2018 it was announced in a press conference that Victor Angelescu, a 34-year-old entrepreneur, that is working at the Romanian branch of APS Group and also a former football player, at youth level, bought 50% of the club's shares.

In the summer of 2019, Ovidiu Onosă, owner of Carmen București took Sportul Snagov, but after a weak first part of the championship and due to historical debts of the club, Onosă withdrew and took the control of Liga III side Dacia Unirea Brăila instead. Sportul Snagov was excluded subsequently and then dissolved.

== Grounds ==
=== Stadionul Damila ===
Between 2007 and 2013, when the club was known as Damila Măciuca, it played its home matches on Damila Stadium, from Măciuca, with a capacity of 3,000 seats.

=== Stadionul Mircea Chivu ===
Between 2013 and 2016, when the club was known as Metalul Reșița, played its home matches on Mircea Chivu Stadium, with a capacity of 12,500 seats.

=== Stadionul Voința ===
From 2016 Sportul Snagov plays its matches on Voința Stadium from Ghermănești (a village of Snagov Commune), with a capacity of 2,000 seats.

In February 2018 it was announced that Sportul will play in the second part of the championship on Dumitru Mătărău Stadium from Ștefăneștii de Jos due to the changing of the surface from Voința Stadium, a pitch with major problems in the past, in terms of quality.

== Honours ==
=== Leagues ===
- Liga III
  - Winners (1): 2011–12
- Liga IV – Vâlcea County
  - Winners (1): 2010–11

== League history ==
Season	Tier	Division	Place	Cupa României
2019–20	2	Liga II	18th (R)	
2018–19	2	Liga II	5th	Round of 32
2017–18	2	Liga II	10th	
2016–17	2	Liga II	16th	
2015–16	2	Liga II (Seria II)	12th	
2014–15	2	Liga II (Seria II)	3rd	

Season	Tier	Division	Place	Cupa României
2013–14	2	Liga II (Seria II)	4th	Round of 32
2012–13	2	Liga II (Seria II)	3rd	Round of 32
2011–12	3	Liga III (Seria IV)	1st (C, P)	
2010–11	4	Liga IV (VL)	1st (C, P)	
2009–10	4	Liga IV (VL)	2nd	
2008–09	4	Liga IV (VL)	14th	
