= 2014–15 CSM Studențesc Iași season =

CSMS Iași
2014–15 season
- President: Florin Prunea
- Manager: Marius Lăcătuş
- Stadium: Stadionul Emil Alexandrescu
- Liga I: Ongoing
- Cupa României: Round of 32
- Cupa Ligii: Quarterfinals
Home colours	Away colours	colours

The 2014–15 season is CSMS Iași's 5th season in the Romanian football league system, and their second season in the Liga I. CSMS were promoted to the first league after winning Seria I of the 2013–14 Liga II.

== Players ==
=== First team squad ===
As of 20 August 2014.

Note: Flags indicate national team as defined under FIFA eligibility rules; some limited exceptions apply. Players may hold more than one non-FIFA nationality.

No.	Pos.	Nation	Player
1	GK	ITA	Alessandro Caparco
4	DF	ROU	Ovidiu Mihalache
5	MF	ROU	Narcis Bădic
6	DF	ROU	Alexandru Crețu
7	MF	ROU	Adrian Olah
8	MF	ROU	Gabriel Bosoi
9	MF	LBR	Dulee Johnson
10	MF	ROU	Liviu Ionuț Mihai
11	FW	ROU	Alexandru Ciucur
14	DF	ROU	Bogdan Vișa
17	FW	ROU	Leonard Dobre
18	FW	ROU	Mădălin Crengăniș
19	FW	ROU	Clement Pălimaru

No.	Pos.	Nation	Player
20	DF	ROU	Iulian Vladu
21	MF	HUN	Lukács Bőle
22	MF	SRB	Milan Mitić
23	GK	ROU	Nicuşor Grecu
25	MF	ROU	Mugurel Dedu
26	DF	ROU	Ionuț Voicu
27	MF	ROU	Daniel Novac
28	DF	ROU	Lucian Munteanu
29	DF	ROU	Florin Plămadă
30	MF	ROU	Alexandru Țigănașu
33	GK	BIH	Branko Grahovac
77	MF	ROU	Marius Călugăru
80	FW	BRA	Wesley

== Competitions ==
=== Overall ===
Competition	Started round	Current position / round	Final position / round	First match	Last match
Liga I	—	2nd		28 July 2014	28 May 2015
Cupa României	Round of 32	—			
Cupa Ligii	Play-off round	—	Quarter-finals	16 July 2014	

Updated to match played 21 August 2014
Source: Competitions

=== Liga I ===
==== Results summary ====
Overall								Home						Away					
Pld	W	D	L	GF	GA	GD	Pts	W	D	L	GF	GA	GD	W	D	L	GF	GA	GD
4	0	2	2	2	7	−5	2	0	1	1	1	5	−4	0	1	1	1	2	−1

Last updated: 21 August 2014.
Source: Matches

==== Results by round ====
Round	1	2	3	4	5	6	7	8	9	10	11	12	13	14	15	16	17	18	19	20	21	22	23	24	25	26	27	28	29	30	31	32	33	34
Ground	H	A	H	A	H	A	H	A	H	A	H	A	A	H	A	H	A																	
Result	D	D	L	L	D																													
Position	10	11	16	15	15																													

Updated to match(es) played on 21 August 2014. Source: Matches
A = Away; H = Home; W = Win; D = Draw; L = Loss

==== Matches ====
Win Draw Loss

28 July 2014 1	CSMS Iași	0–0	Viitorul Constanța	Iași
				Stadium: Emil Alexandrescu; Attendance: 5000; Referee: Radu Petrescu

4 August 2014 2	Gaz Metan Mediaș	0-0	CSMS Iași	Mediaș
				Stadium: Municipal Gaz Metan; Attendance: 1000; Referee: Istvan Kovacs

10 August 2014 3	CSMS Iași	1–5	Petrolul Ploiești	Iași
	Wesley 24'	Report	Teixeira 19'; Mutu 50'; Tamuz 57', 71'; Albín 90+2'	Stadium: Emil Alexandrescu; Attendance: 6000; Referee: Cristian Balaj

16 August 2014 4	Astra Giurgiu	2-1	CSMS Iași	Giurgiu
	Seto 16'; Fatai 39'		Munteanu 64'	Stadium: Marin Anastasovici; Attendance: 1200; Referee: Catalin Popa

25 August 2014 5	CSMS Iași	0-0	Oțelul Galați	Iași
		Report		Stadium: Emil Alexandrescu; Referee: George Catalin Gaman

1 September 2014 6	Universitatea Cluj	2-0	CSMS Iași	Cluj-Napoca
21:00	Mebgolo (yellow card) 19'; Viveiros 22'; Mușat 37' (pen.)	Summary	Gabriel Bosoi (yellow card) 6'; Mitici Mitic (yellow card) 37'	Stadium: Cluj Arena; Attendance: 2,600; Referee: (Romania) Florin Miron

14 September 2014 7	CSMS Iași	2-2	ASA Târgu Mureș	Iași
16:00	Crețu 8'; Voicu (yellow card) 42'; Hora 82' (o.g.)	Summary	Hora (yellow card) 15'; N'Doye 30'; Voiculeț (yellow card) 33'; Goga (yellow card) 43' (goal) 64'; Mureșan (yellow card) 69'; Bejan (yellow card) 86'; Sepsi (yellow card) 90+2'; Feussi (yellow card) 90+3'	Stadium: Emil Alexandrescu; Attendance: 3,000; Referee: (Romania) Iulian Dima

20 September 2014 8	Dinamo București	1-0	CSMS Iași	București
21:00	Lazăr (yellow card) 39'; Cordoș (yellow card) 45+2'; Filip (yellow card) 69'; Alexe 75'	Summary	Novac (yellow card) 23'; Olah (yellow card) 31'	Stadium: Dinamo; Attendance: 5,000; Referee: (Romania) Marcel Bîrsan

26 September 2014 9	CSMS Iași	1-2	Concordia Chiajna	Iași
21:00	Munteanu (yellow card) 5'; Crețu 18'; Olah (yellow card) 29' (yellow-red card); Țigănașu (yellow card) 78'; Voicu (yellow card) 89'	Summary	Pena 26' (yellow card) 49'; Wellington Carlos da Silva 36'; Dyulgerov (yellow card) 43'; Stan (yellow card) 61'; Fernando Henrique Boldrin (yellow card) 75'; Purece (yellow card) 88'; Râmniceanu (yellow card) 90+2'	Stadium: Emil Alexandrescu; Attendance: 2,500; Referee: (Romania) Drago Istrate

3 October 2014 10	Brașov	2-0	CSMS Iași	Brașov
18:30	Ricardo Machado 31'; Alexandru Ciocâlteu (yellow card) 48'; Străuț (yellow card) 88'; Ganea (yellow card) 90+1'; Constantinescu 90+3'	Summary		Stadium: Silviu Ploeșteanu; Attendance: 150; Referee: (Romania) Horaiu Fesnic

17 October 2014 11	CSMS Iași	2-2	Botoșani	Iași
18:30 EET	Cosereanu 2'; Țigănașu (yellow card) 28'; Onduku (yellow card) 35' (yellow-red card) (goal) 47'; Voicu (yellow card) 47'; Wesley (yellow card) 80'	Summary	Tincu (yellow card) 20' (yellow-red card); Martinus 29'; Fülöp (yellow card) 31'; Oltean (yellow card) 58'; Vașvari (yellow card) 67'; Claudiu Codoban 77'	Stadium: Emil Alexandrescu; Attendance: 3,000; Referee: (Romania) Ionuț Avram

25 October 2014 12	Ceahlăul Piatra Neamț	2-2	CSMS Iași	Piatra Neamț
16:00	Cârjan 58'; Mândrușcă (yellow card) 59' (goal) 66'; Onciu (yellow card) 70'	Summary	Novac 13'; Wesley 41'; Gabriel Bosoi (yellow card) 44'; Ciucur (yellow card) 64'	Stadium: Ceahlăul; Attendance: 500; Referee: (Romania) Radu Petrescu

4 November 2014 13	Rapid București	0-1	CSMS Iași	București
15:00 EET	Dan (yellow card) 27'; Vasile (yellow card) 30'; Mera (yellow card) 71' (yellow-red card); Dică (yellow card) 79'	Summary	Wesley 27' (pen.); Țigănașu (yellow card) 31'; Voicu (yellow card) 47'	Stadium: Giulești-Valentin Stănescu; Attendance: 1,500; Referee: (Romania) Constantin Sebastian Colțescu

9 November 2014 14	CSMS Iași	1-3	Universitatea Craiova	Iași
15:30 EET	Bőle 82'; Plămadă (yellow card) 85'	Summary	Rocha 3' 33'; Târnăcop 78'; Bălgrădean (yellow card) 90'	Stadium: Emil Alexandrescu; Attendance: 3,000; Referee: (Romania) Lucian Ruşandu

23 November 2014 15	CFR Cluj	4-0	CSMS Iași	Cluj-Napoca
18:00 EET	Ivanovski 5' 79' (yellow card) 61'; Rada (yellow card) 24'; Tadé 67'; Cornel Ene (yellow card) 75'; Filip Jazvić 81'; Felgueiras (yellow card) 87'	Summary	Crețu (yellow card) 45'; Novac (yellow card) 63'	Stadium: Dr. Constantin Rădulescu; Attendance: 3,000; Referee: (Romania) Florin Mihai Marcu

28 November 2014 16	CSMS Iași	3-0	Pandurii Târgu Jiu	Iași
20:30 EET	Matulevičius 12' (o.g.); Bőle 17'; Munteanu (yellow card) 22'; Crețu (yellow card) 24' (yellow-red card); Bădic (yellow card) 36'; Gabriel Bosoi 56'; Mitić (yellow card) 87'	Summary	Roman (yellow card) 24'; Momčilović (yellow card) 40'; Nicoară (yellow card) 67'	Stadium: Emil Alexandrescu; Attendance: 700; Referee: (Romania) Alexandru Tudor

7 December 2014 17	Steaua București	1-0	CSMS Iași	București
18:00	Sânmărtean (yellow card) 31'; Prepeliță (yellow card) 60' (yellow-red card); Rusescu (yellow card) 90+1'; Szukała 90+5'	Summary	Grahovac (yellow card) 74' (yellow-red card)	Stadium: Steaua; Attendance: 2,000; Referee: (Romania) Iuian Călin

20 February 2015 18	Viitorul Constanța	0-3	CSMS Iași	Chiajna
18:00	Tănase (yellow card) 6'; Benzar (yellow card) 56'; Mitrea (yellow card) 78'; Daminuță (yellow card) 81'; Buzbuchi (yellow card) 88'	Summary	Ciucur 26' 85'; Plămadă 45+1'; Mihalache (yellow card) 59'; Voicu (yellow card) 66'; Onduku (yellow card) 89'	Stadium: Stadionul Concordia; Attendance: 200; Referee: (Romania) Adrian Comănescu

28 February 2015 19	CSMS Iași	1-0	Gaz Metan Mediaș	Iași
18:00	Golubović 35'; Plămadă (yellow card) 62'; Enescu (yellow card) 73'; Țigănașu (yellow card) 90+1'	Summary	Tahar (yellow card) 27'; Abrudan (yellow card) 33'; Curtean (yellow card) 36'; Bekoé (yellow card) 63'	Stadium: Emil Alexandrescu; Attendance: 3,500; Referee: (Romania) Andrei Florin Chivulete

Last updated: 21 August 2014

=== Cupa României ===
==== Round of 32 ====
Last updated: 2 July 2014

=== Cupa Ligii ===
==== Play-off round ====
16 July 2014	Târgu Mureș	0–2	Studențesc Iași	Stadionul Trans-Sil, Târgu Mureş
20:00			Crețu 39'; Mihai 86'	Referee: Iulian Dima (Bucharest)

==== Round of 16 ====
20 July 2014	Studențesc Iași	4–2	CFR Cluj	Stadionul Emil Alexandrescu, Iași
17:00	Mihai 5'; Mihalache 13'; Pălimaru 58'; Olah 80' (pen.)		Japonês 38' (pen.); Păun 45'	Attendance: 4,000; Referee: Cătălin Popa (Pitești)

Last updated: 21 August 2014

== Pre-season and friendlies ==
Win Draw Loss

6 July 2014 Friendly	CSMS Iași (Romania)	1–2	(Serbia) FK Jagodina
	Narcis Bădic 67'		31'; 76'

8 July 2014 Friendly	CSMS Iași (Romania)	8–1	(Slovenia) Beltinci
	Dobre 25'; Crețu 35'; Bőle 52', 56', 75'; Țigănașu 60'; Pălimaru 78'

10 July 2014 Friendly	CSMS Iași (Romania)	0–1	(Hungary) Puskás Akadémia

12 July 2014 Friendly	CSMS Iași (Romania)	0–0	(Croatia) NK Zagreb

Last updated: 21 August 2014

== See also ==
- 2014–15 Liga I
- 2014–15 Cupa României
- 2014–15 Cupa Ligii
