= 2015–16 FC Bihor Oradea (1958) season =

Bihor Oradea
2015–16 season
- Owner: Bihor County Council; Mihai Giurgiu
- Chairman: Mircea Fodor
- Manager: Gheorghe Silaghi (1–9); Claudiu Mutu (10); Dan Mănăilă (11–18)
- Stadium: Iuliu Bodola
- Liga II: 13th (relegated)
- Cupa României: Fourth Round
- Top goalscorer: League: Andrei Sulea (3); All: Andrei Sulea (3)
- Highest home attendance: 800 vs Mioveni (29 August 2015); 800 vs UTA Arad (25 October 2015)
- Lowest home attendance: 100 vs Olimpia (21 November 2015); 100 vs Brașov (28 November 2015)
- Average home league attendance: 422
Home colours	Away colours

The 2015–16 season was Bihor Oradea's 57th season in the Romanian football league system, and their 37th season in the Liga II. On 12 January 2016, during the winter break, the club was declared bankrupt, after serious financial problems and several months in which the club lived from one day to the next.

== Players ==
=== First team squad ===
As of 15 August 2017

Note: Flags indicate national team as defined under FIFA eligibility rules; some limited exceptions apply. Players may hold more than one non-FIFA nationality.

No.	Pos.	Nation	Player
1	GK	ROU	Răzvan Egri
3	DF	ROU	Bogdan Ţoca
4	DF	ROU	Norbert Lörincz
5	DF	ROU	Sebastian Matei
6	DF	ROU	Sebastian Remeş
7	FW	ROU	Ciprian Cornea
8	MF	ROU	Raul Ember (Vice-Captain)
9	FW	ROU	Andrei Sulea
10	MF	ROU	Cristian Andor (Captain)
11	MF	ROU	Alexandru Maria
12	GK	ROU	David Király
13	MF	ROU	Cristopher Sas
14	DF	ROU	George Mangra
15	FW	ROU	Adrian Olariu

No.	Pos.	Nation	Player
16	MF	ROU	Dan Negrea
17	MF	ROU	Andrei Magda
18	MF	ROU	Iosif Sereş
19	DF	ROU	Bogdan Mintaş
20	MF	ROU	Andrei Haş
21	DF	ROU	Marian Arsene
23	DF	ROU	Bogdan Chira
25	MF	ROU	Roland Novak
26	MF	ROU	Andrei Coroian
27	MF	ROU	Andrei Ferik
28	MF	ROU	Ionuţ Pantea
29	FW	ROU	Kevin Trabalka (on loan from Dinamo București)
30	GK	UKR	Oleksandr Nad

== Club officials ==
=== Board of directors ===
Role	Name
Owners	(Romania) Bihor County Council (Romania) Mihai Giurgiu
President	(Romania) Mircea Fodor
Board members	(Romania) Florin Bogdan (Romania) Nicolae Gherdan (Romania) Andras Grim (Romania) Șerban Popovici
Organizer of Competitions	(Romania) Sergiu Albu
Press officer	(Romania) Florin Mihalca

=== Technical staff ===
Role	Name
Manager	(Romania) Dan Mănăilă
Assistant manager	(Romania) Alin Pintea
Goalkeeping coach	(Romania) Vlad Gheţe
Club Doctor	(Romania) Alin Iova
Masseur	(Romania) Desideriu Szilágyi
Psychologist	(Romania) Gyöngyi Dézsi

== Pre-season and friendlies ==
1 August 2015	Bihor Oradea (Romania)	4–1	(Romania) Bihorul Beiuș	Oradea, Romania
11:00 UTC+3	Ember 4'; Cigan 11'; Andor 27'; Magda 80'	Report	Mândru 75'	Stadium: Iuliu Bodola

5 August 2015	Bihorul Beiuș (Romania)	2–3	(Romania) Bihor Oradea	Beiuș, Romania
11:00 UTC+3	Goal	Report	Maria; Kairon; Ember	Stadium: Francisc Matei

23 August 2015	ASU Politehnica Timișoara (Romania)	0–2	(Romania) Bihor Oradea	Timișoara, Romania
20:00 UTC+3		Report	Chira 68'; Cornea 70'	Stadium: Știința; Attendance: 500; Referee: Răzvan Drăgoi (Timișoara)

== Competitions ==
=== Liga II ===
==== League table ====
Pos	Team	Pld	W	D	L	GF	GA	GD	Pts	Promotion or relegation
10	Olimpia Satu Mare	26	9	6	11	35	36	−1	33	Qualification to relegation play-out
11	Unirea Tărlungeni	26	5	9	12	26	34	−8	24	Qualification to relegation play-out
12	Bihor Oradea (Note: Bihor Oradea was dissolved and lost all the matches from the second part of the season with 0-3.) (D, R)	25	4	1	20	10	58	−48	13	Relegation to Liga III
13	Metalul Reșița (Note: Metalul Reșița were deducted 15 points.)	26	3	1	22	18	74	−56	−5	Qualification to relegation play-out
14	Caransebeș (Note: Caransebeș were deducted 96 points. Then later were excluded from the championship and lost all the matches from the second part of the season with 0-3.) (D, R)	25	3	1	21	11	63	−52	−86	Relegation to Liga III

Source: FRF (in Romanian)
Rules for classification: 1st points; 2nd head-to-head points; 3rd head-to-head goal difference; 4th head-to-head goals scored; 5th head-to-head away goals scored; 6th goal difference; 7th number of goals scored
(D) Disqualified; (R) Relegated

==== Result round by round ====
Round	1	2	3	4	5	6	7	8	9	10	11	12	13	14	15	16	17	18	19	20	21	22	23	24	25	26
Ground	H	A	H	A	H	A	H	H	A	H	A	H	A	A	H	A	H	A	H	A	A	H	A	H	A	H
Result	L	L	L	D	L	W	W	W	L	L	W	L	L	L	L	L	L	L	C	L	L	L	L	L	L	L
Position	13	13	13	13	13	12	11	10	11	12	11	11	11	11	11	11	12	13	13	13	13	13	13	13	13	13

Source: frfotbal.ro
A = Away; H = Home; W = Win; D = Draw; L = Loss; C = Cancelled

==== Results ====
29 August 2015 1	Bihor Oradea	0–2	Mioveni	Oradea
11:00 UTC+3		Report	B.Stoica 18'; Toriște 23'	Stadium: Iuliu Bodola; Attendance: 800; Referee: Denis Haidiner (Hunedoara)

5 September 2015 2	Olimpia Satu Mare	2–1	Bihor Oradea	Satu Mare
11:00 UTC+3	Muntean 73'; Faur 77'	Report	Sulea 28'	Stadium: Olimpia; Attendance: 1,200; Referee: Paul Unimatan (Zalău)

12 September 2015 3	Bihor Oradea	0–1	Râmnicu Vâlcea	Oradea
11:00 UTC+3		Report	Tomozei 19'	Stadium: Iuliu Bodola; Attendance: 300; Referee: Dorin Voina (Reșița)

19 September 2015 4	Brașov	1–1	Bihor Oradea	Brașov
11:00 UTC+3	Matei 20'	Report	Ember 90+2'	Stadium: Silviu Ploeșteanu; Attendance: 400; Referee: Andrei Ţiţii (Șura Mică)

26 September 2015 5	Bihor Oradea	0–2	Baia Mare	Oradea
11:00 UTC+3		Report	Arnăutu 34'; Balaure 40' (pen.)	Stadium: Iuliu Bodola; Attendance: 300; Referee: Flavius Roșu (Timișoara)

3 October 2015 6	Caransebeș	2–3	Bihor Oradea	Caransebeș
11:00 UTC+3	Telecican 7'; Lupu 37'	Report	Andor 27'; Trabalka 38'; Coroian 65'	Stadium: Municipal; Attendance: 700; Referee: Dan Dreve (Cluj-Napoca)

7 October 2015 7	Bihor Oradea	2–1	Metalul Reșița	Oradea
15:00 UTC+3	Sulea 13'; Feher 60' (og.)	Report	Guehi 77'	Stadium: Iuliu Bodola; Attendance: 400; Referee: Marius Chioran (Satu Mare)

10 October 2015 8	Bihor Oradea	1–0	Șoimii Pâncota	Oradea
11:00 UTC+3	Mintaș 54'	Report		Stadium: Iuliu Bodola; Attendance: 400; Referee: Dorin Voina (Reșița)

17 October 2015 9	Chindia Târgoviște	3–0 (forfait)	Bihor Oradea	Târgoviște
11:00 UTC+3		Report		Stadium: Eugen Popescu

25 October 2015 10	Bihor Oradea	0–4	UTA Arad	Oradea
11:00 UTC+3		Report	Burlă 20'; Curtuiuș 35', 80'; Man 73'	Stadium: Iuliu Bodola; Attendance: 800; Referee: Florin Mazilu (Satu Mare)

31 October 2015 11	Unirea Tărlungeni	1–2	Bihor Oradea	Tărlungeni
11:00 UTC+3	Forika 65'	Report	Mintaș 37'; Andor 90+3'	Stadium: Unirea; Attendance: 150; Referee: Cătălin Buși (Râmnicu Vâlcea)

8 November 2015 12	Bihor Oradea	0–1	Gaz Metan Mediaș	Oradea
11:30 UTC+2		Report	Romeo 81'	Stadium: Iuliu Bodola; Attendance: 600; Referee: Dorian Micloșină (Reșița)

11 November 2015 13	Universitatea Cluj	2–0	Bihor Oradea	Cluj-Napoca
14:00 UTC+2	Greu 14' (pen.); János 90+3'	Report		Stadium: Cluj Arena; Attendance: 600; Referee: Paul Unimătan (Zalău)

14 November 2015 14	Mioveni	4–0; 3–0 (forfait)	Bihor Oradea	Pitești
11:00 UTC+2	Biceanu 38'; Toriște 43'; Nilă 84'; Neacșu 90+2'	Report		Stadium: Nicolae Dobrin; Attendance: 1,000; Referee: Omar Dumitrică (Craiova)

21 November 2015 15	Bihor Oradea	0–5; 0–3 (forfait)	Olimpia Satu Mare	Oradea
11:00 UTC+2		Report	Muntean 14'; Sălăgeanu 17', 84'; Takács 45+2' (pen.); Iuhas 62'	Stadium: Iuliu Bodola; Attendance: 100; Referee: Florin Andrei (Târgu Mureș)

25 November 2015 16	Râmnicu Vâlcea	2–0; 3–0 (forfait)	Bihor Oradea	Râmnicu Vâlcea
14:00 UTC+2	Ludușan 18'; Firțulescu 36'	Report		Stadium: Municipal; Attendance: 700; Referee: Dorin Voina (Reșița)

28 November 2015 17	Bihor Oradea	2–7; 0–3 (forfait)	Brașov	Oradea
11:00 UTC+2	Andor 86'; Sulea 90+2'	Report	Olteanu 13'; Matei 20', 54', 57'; Rusu 37', 77'; Codoban 79'	Stadium: Iuliu Bodola; Attendance: 100; Referee: Nicolae Botaș (Timișoara)

5 December 2015 18	Baia Mare	6–0; 3–0 (forfait)	Bihor Oradea	Râmnicu Vâlcea
11:00 UTC+2	Codin 1'; Străuț 9'; Oltean 21'; Sârbu 36'; Lupu 45' (pen.); Fl.Ilie 86'	Report		Stadium: Viorel Mateianu; Attendance: 500; Referee: Paul Unimătan (Zalău)

27 February 2016 19	Bihor Oradea	Canceled	Caransebeș	Oradea
11:00 UTC+2		Report		Stadium: Iuliu Bodola

5 March 2016 20	Metalul Reșița	3–0 (forfait)	Bihor Oradea	Reșița
11:00 UTC+2		Report		Stadium: Mircea Chivu

9 March 2016 21	Șoimii Pâncota	3–0 (forfait)	Bihor Oradea	Pâncota
11:00 UTC+2		Report		Stadium: Șoimii

12 March 2016 22	Bihor Oradea	0–3 (forfait)	Chindia Târgoviște	Oradea
11:00 UTC+2		Report		Stadium: Iuliu Bodola

19 March 2016 23	UTA Arad	3–0 (forfait)	Bihor Oradea	Arad
11:00 UTC+2		Report		Stadium: Motorul

23 March 2016 24	Bihor Oradea	0–3 (forfait)	Unirea Tărlungeni	Oradea
11:00 UTC+2		Report		Stadium: Iuliu Bodola

26 March 2016 25	Gaz Metan Mediaș	3–0 (forfait)	Bihor Oradea	Mediaș
11:00 UTC+2		Report		Stadium: Gaz Metan

2 April 2016 26	Bihor Oradea	0–3 (forfait)	Universitatea Cluj	Oradea
11:00 UTC+3		Report		Stadium: Iuliu Bodola

=== Cupa României ===
25 August 2015 Fourth Round	Oşorhei	2–1	Bihor Oradea	Alparea
17:30 UTC+3	Ov.Popa 1'; Trip 61'	Report	Andor 14'	Stadium: Comunal; Attendance: 1,000; Referee: Mircea Ardelean (Arad)

== See also ==
- 2015–16 Cupa României
- Liga II
