= 2015–16 Cupa României =

Cupa României 2015–16
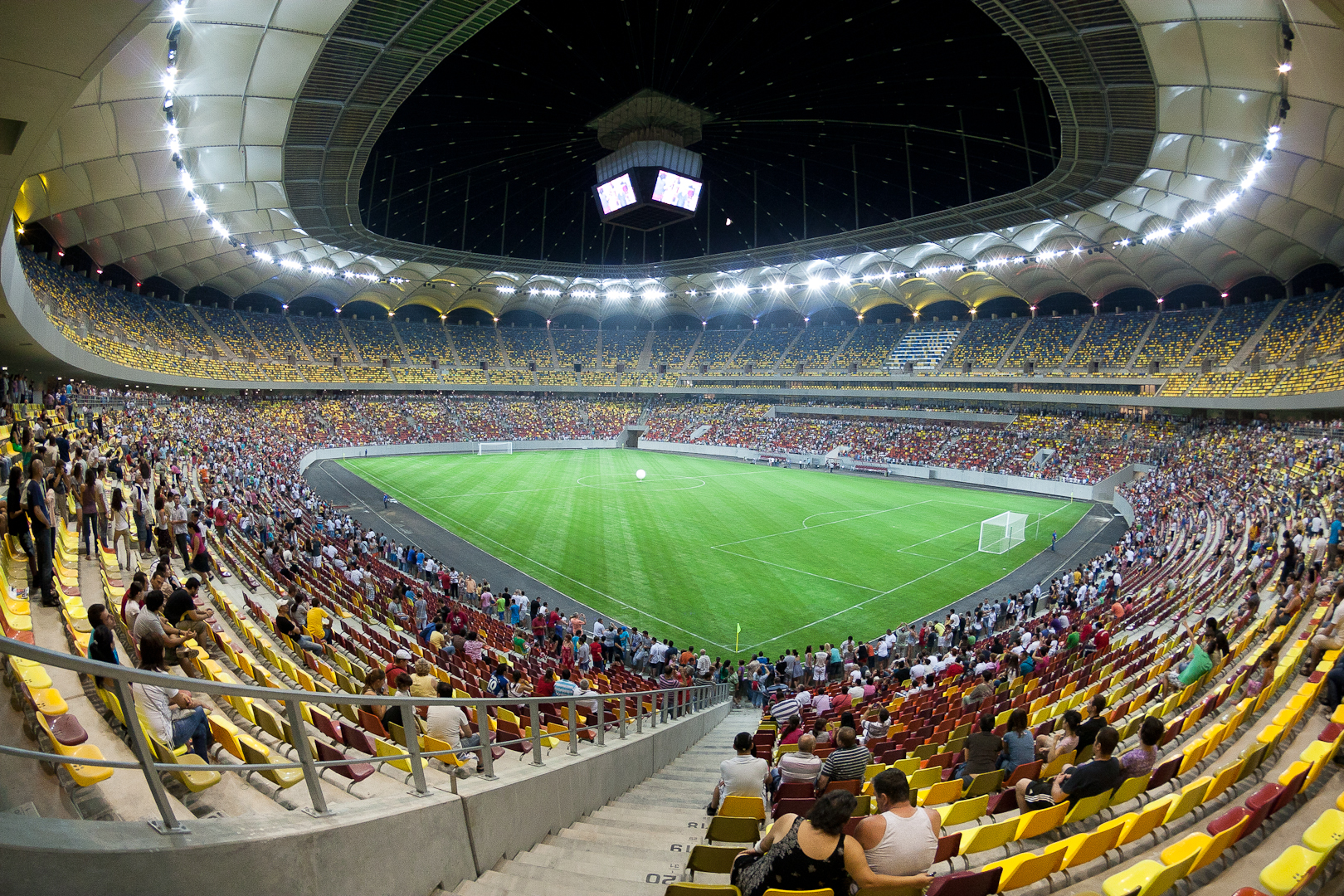
- Arena Națională in Bucharest hosted the final.

Tournament details
- Country: Romania
- Teams: 202

Final positions
- Champions: CFR Cluj
- Runners-up: Dinamo București

The 2015–16 Cupa României was the seventy-eighth season of the annual Romanian primary football knockout tournament.

== Participating clubs ==
The following 185 teams qualified for the competition:

2014–15 Liga I all clubs	2014–15 Liga II all clubs	2014–15 Liga III all clubs
ASA 2013 Târgu Mureș; FC Steaua București; FC Petrolul Ploiești; FC Astra Giurgiu; FC Botoșani; FC Dinamo București; Universitatea Craiova; CSM Studențesc Iași; FC Viitorul Constanța; CS Pandurii Târgu Jiu; CS Concordia Chiajna; CS Gaz Metan Mediaș; FC Rapid București; FC Universitatea Cluj; FC Brașov; CFR Cluj; FC Oțelul Galați; FC Ceahlăul Piatra Neamț	FC Voluntari; FC Clinceni; ACS Rapid CFR Suceava; FC Gloria Buzău; SC Bacău; CF Brăila; CS Balotești; FCM Dorohoi; FC Farul Constanța; ACS Berceni; FC Unirea Slobozia; ACS Poli Timișoara; CSM Metalul Reșița; Inter Olt Slatina; CS Unirea Tărlungeni; CS Mioveni; FC Olimpia Satu Mare; CSM Râmnicu Vâlcea; FC Caransebeș; FC Bihor Oradea; CS Șoimii Pâncota	Bucovina Pojorâta; Dunărea Călărași; FC Chindia Târgoviște; UTA Arad; FCM Baia Mare; Știința Miroslava; Juventus București; CS Afumați; Nuova Mama Mia; Metalurgistul Cugir; Sepsi OSK; Delta Tulcea; Concordia II Chiajna; CSM Lugoj; FC Zalău; Aerostar Bacău; CS Tunari; CS Ștefănești; Naţional Sebiş; CSM Sighetu Marmației; Petrotub Roman; Metaloglobus București; Sporting Roșiori; Millenium Giarmata; CS Oșorhei; FK Miercurea Ciuc; Dinamo II București; SCM Pitești; Pandurii II Târgu Jiu; CSC Sânmartin; Bucovina Rădăuți; Gloria Popești-Leordeni; Atletic Bradu; CSO Filiași; Unirea Jucu; Cetatea Târgu Neamț; Înainte Modelu; Inter Clinceni; FC Hunedoara; Arieșul Turda; CSM Pașcani; Metalosport Galați; Urban Titu; CS Ineu; Avântul Reghin; Sporting Liești; Callatis Mangalia; FCM Târgoviște; Știința Turceni; Industria Galda de Jos; FC Zagon; Viitorul Axintele; CS Podari; Minerul Motru; CS Iernut; Ceahlăul II Piatra Neamț; Voința Snagov; CS Vișina Nouă; Metropolitan Ișalnița; Sănătatea Cluj; FC Păpăuți; Viitorul Domnești; Muscelul Câmpulung; Minerul Mehedinți; Gloria Bistrița; Oţelul II Galați; Astra II Giurgiu; Unirea Dej
42 representatives of regional associations^{1}
Performanța Ighiu (Alba); Șoimii Lipova (Arad); Voința Budeasa (Argeș); SC Bacău II (Bacău); Bihorul Beiuș (Bihor); ASC Dumitra (Bistrița-Năsăud); ACS Inter Dorohoi (Botoșani); AFC Hărman (Brașov); Victoria Traian (Brăila); CS FC Chitila (Bucharest); FC Puiești (Buzău); CSM Școlar Reșița (Caraș-Severin); Victoria Chirnogi (Călărași); Someșul Apahida (Cluj)	Viitorul II Constanța (Constanța); FC Păpăuți II (Covasna); CS Flacăra Moreni (Dâmbovița); Universitatea II Craiova (Dolj); Avântul Valea Mărului (Galați); Unirea Izvoarele (Giurgiu); Gilortul Târgu Cărbunești (Gorj); Unirea Cristuru Secuiesc (Harghita); Șoimul Băița (Hunedoara); Victoria Munteni Buzău (Ialomița); Rapid Dumești (Iași); CS Viitorul Ulmeni (Maramureș); Pandurii Cerneți (Mehedinți); ASA II Târgu Mureș (Mureș)	Victoria Horia (Neamț); AS Milcov (Olt); CS Păulești (Prahova); Olimpia II Satu Mare (Satu Mare); Luceafărul Bălan (Sălaj); LSS Voința Sibiu (Sibiu); Bucovina II Pojorâta (Suceava); Unirea Brânceni (Teleorman); Ripensia Timișoara (Timiș); Granitul Babadag (Tulcea); Atletico Vaslui (Vaslui); Flacăra Horezu (Vâlcea); Euromania Dumbrăveni (Vrancea)

== First round ==
All matches were played on 15 July 2015.

Team 1	Score	Team 2
15 July 2015
Bucovina II Pojorâta (4)	0–1	Bucovina Rădăuți (3)
Victoria Horia (4)	3–5	CSM Pașcani (3)
Rapid Dumești (4)	2–1	Inter Dorohoi (3)
SC Bacău II (4)	w/o	Ceahlăul II Piatra Neamț (3)
Atletico Vaslui (3)	3–0	Sporting Liești (3)
Granitul Babadag (4)	w/o	Oțelul II Galați (4)
Avântul Valea Mărului (4)	2–1 (a.e.t.)	Metalosport Galați (3)
Viitorul II Constanța (3)	9–0	Callatis Mangalia (3)
FC Puiești (4)	1–1 (a.e.t.) (7–6 p)	Victoria Traian (4)
Euromania Dumbrăveni (4)	w/o	FC Păpăuți (4)
FC Păpăuți II (4)	2–2 (a.e.t.) (4–5 p)	FC Zagon (3)
CS Păulești (4)	3–1	Astra II Giurgiu (3)
Victoria Muntenii Buzău (4)	w/o	Viitorul Axintele (4)
Voința Buftea (4)	6–2	Inter Clinceni (3)
FC Chitila (4)	1–3	Voința Snagov (3)
Victoria Chirnogi (4)	1–3	Viitorul Domnești (3)
Flacăra Moreni (4)	4–2 (a.e.t.)	FCM Târgoviște (3)
Unirea Izvoarele (4)	5–4 (a.e.t.)	Urban Titu (3)
Voința Budeasa (4)	3–6	Muscelul Câmpulung (4)
Unirea Brânceni (4)	10–1	CS Vișina Nouă (3)
LSS Voința Sibiu (4)	4–4 (a.e.t.) (2–4 p)	AFC Hărman (3)
Unirea Cristuru Secuiesc (4)	1–0	Avântul Reghin (3)
ASA II Târgu Mureș (4)	7–2	CS Iernut (3)
AS Milcov (4)	2–1	Flacăra Horezu (4)
ASC Dumitra (4)	w/o	Gloria Bistrița (4)
Viitorul Ulmeni (4)	8–3	Unirea Dej (3)
Luceafărul Bălan (3)	1–3	Sănătatea Cluj (3)
Someșul Apahida (4)	3–0	Arieșul Turda (3)
Bihorul Beiuș (4)	2–0	Olimpia II Satu Mare (4)
Performanța Ighiu (3)	1–0	Industria Galda (3)
Șoimii Lipova (4)	0–2	CS Ineu (3)
Șoimul Băița (4)	1–0	FC Hunedoara (3)
Universitatea II Craiova (3)	2–1	Metropolitan Ișalnița (3)
Pandurii Cerneți (4)	3–2	CS Podari (3)
Ripensia Timișoara (4)	w/o	Minerul Mehedinți (4)
Gilortul Târgu Cărbunești (4)	0–4	Minerul Motru (3)
CSM Școlar Reșița (4)	w/o	Știința Turceni (3)

== Second round ==
The matches were played on 28 and 29 July 2015.

Team 1	Score	Team 2
28 July 2015
ASA II Târgu Mureș (4)	1–0	FK Miercurea Ciuc (3)
29 July 2015
Viitorul Ulmeni (4)	2–3	Unirea Jucu (3)
ASC Dumitra (4)	0–2	Bucovina Rădăuți (3)
Someşul Apahida (4)	w/o	Sănătatea Cluj (3)
Bihorul Beiuș (4)	0–1	CS Ineu (3)
CSM Școlar Reșița (4)	0–5	Ripensia Timişoara (4)
Pandurii Cerneți (4)	1–5	Minerul Motru (3)
Universitatea II Craiova (3)	5–0	CSO Filiași (3)
AS Milcov (4)	4–2	Atletic Bradu (3)
Unirea Brânceni (4)	2–1 (a.e.t.)	Unirea Izvoarele (4)
Flacăra Moreni (4)	6–0	Viitorul Domnesti (3)
Voința Buftea (4)	0–9	Voința Snagov (3)
Viitorul II Constanța (3)	3–0	Înainte Modelu (3)
Victoria Muntenii Buzău (4)	w/o	Granitul Babadag (4)
CS Păulești (4)	2–0	FC Puiești (4)
Unirea Cristuru Secuiesc (4)	1–0	FC Zagon (3)
Euromania Dumbrăveni (4)	2–2 (a.e.t.) (4–2 p)	Avântul Valea Mărului (4)
Atletico Vaslui (3)	w/o	Ceahlăul II Piatra Neamț (3)
Rapid Dumești (4)	3–0	CSM Pașcani (3)
Şoimul Băița (4)	2–1	Performanța Ighiu (3)
AFC Hărman (3)	3–4 (a.e.t.)	Muscelul Câmpulung (4)

== Third round ==
All matches were played on 12 August 2015.

Team 1	Score	Team 2
12 August 2015
Bucovina Rădăuți (3)	3–2	CSM Sighetu Marmației (3)
Rapid Dumești (4)	0–2	Știința Miroslava (3)
Cetatea Târgu Neamț (3)	1–1 (a.e.t.) (3–1 p)	Petrotub Roman (3)
Atletico Vaslui (3)	3–2	Aerostar Bacău (3)
Euromania Dumbrăveni (4)	0–3	Delta Dobrogea Tulcea (3)
Victoria Muntenii Buzău (4)	1–5	Unirea Slobozia (3)
Unirea Cristuru Secuiesc (4)	3–2 (a.e.t.)	Sepsi OSK (3)
Muscelul Câmpulung (4)	0–3	SCM Pitești (3)
Unirea Brânceni (4)	2–0	Sporting Roșiori (3)
AS Milcov (4)	1–2	Inter Olt Slatina (3)
Șoimul Băița (4)	1–4	Pandurii II Târgu Jiu (3)
Universitatea II Craiova (3)	4–1	Minerul Motru (3)
Unirea Jucu (3)	3–0	FC Zalău (3)
Sănătatea Cluj (3)	1–4	Metalurgistul Cugir (3)
CS Ineu (3)	2–2 (a.e.t.) (4–2 p)	Naţional Sebiş (3)
Ripensia Timișoara (4)	3–0	Nuova Mama Mia Becicherecu Mic (3)
Millenium Giarmata (3)	1–5	CSM Lugoj (3)
Gloria Popești-Leordeni (3)	5–2	CS Tunari (3)
Voința Snagov (3)	2–3	CS Afumați (3)
CS Ștefănești (3)	2–1	Juventus București (3)
Flacăra Moreni (4)	1–0	Concordia II Chiajna (3)
Dinamo II București (3)	2–3	Metaloglobus București (3)
Viitorul II Constanța (3)	w/o	Săgeata Năvodari (4)
CS Păulești (4)	w/o	Fortuna Poiana Câmpina (4)
ASA II Târgu Mureș (4)	w/o	Corona Brașov (4)
CSC Sânmartin (4)	w/o	CS Oșorhei (3)

== Fourth round ==
The matches were played on 25 and 26 August 2015.

Team 1	Score	Team 2
25 August 2015
Bucovina Rădăuți (3)	0–0 (a.e.t.) (3–4 p)	Baia Mare (2)
Cetatea Târgu Neamț (3)	0–3	Bucovina Pojorâta (2)
Atletico Vaslui (3)	3–1	Știința Miroslava (3)
Unirea Jucu (3)	2–2 (a.e.t.) (3–4 p)	Metalurgistul Cugir (3)
CS Oşorhei (3)	2–1	Bihor Oradea (2)
CS Ineu (3)	2–1	Șoimii Pâncota (2)
CSM Lugoj (3)	1-2	UTA Arad (2)
Universitatea II Craiova (3)	2–1	Pandurii II Târgu Jiu (3)
Unirea Brânceni (4)	2–0	Inter Olt Slatina (3)
Flacăra Moreni (4)	3–1	SCM Pitești (3)
Delta Dobrogea Tulcea (3)	2–0 (a.e.t.)	Farul Constanța (2)
Viitorul II Constanța (3)	3–0	Dunărea Călărași (2)
Gloria Popești-Leordeni (3)	1–3	ACS Berceni (2)
Metaloglobus București (3)	2–1	CS Ștefănești (3)
CS Afumați (3)	2–2 (a.e.t.) (4–1 p)	Unirea Slobozia (3)
26 August 2015
Unirea Cristuru Secuiesc (4)	0–2	ASA II Târgu Mureș (4)
Ripensia Timișoara (4)	6–1	FC Caransebeș (2)
CS Păulești (4)	2–1	Chindia Târgoviște (2)

== Fifth Round ==
The matches were played on 8 and 9 September 2015.

Team 1	Score	Team 2
8 September 2015
UTA Arad (2)	9–0	Metalul Reșița (2)
Viitorul II Constanța (3)	5–2	Delta Dobrogea Tulcea (3)
CS Afumați (3)	2–2 (a.e.t.) (3–4 p)	Academica Clinceni (2)
CSM Râmnicu Vâlcea (2)	2–1	Gaz Metan Mediaș (2)
9 September 2015
Dacia Unirea Brăila (2)	3–1 (a.e.t.)	Oțelul Galați (2)
Atletico Vaslui (3)	0–1	SC Bacău (2)
Rapid CFR Suceava (2)	3–1 (a.e.t.)	Ceahlăul Piatra Neamț (2)
FCM Baia Mare (2)	1–0 (a.e.t.)	Olimpia Satu Mare (2)
CS Oșorhei (3)	1–3	Universitatea Cluj (2)
ASA II Târgu Mureș (4)	3–3 (a.e.t.) (3–2 p)	Metalurgistul Cugir (3)
Flacăra Moreni (4)	1–3	CS Mioveni (2)
Unirea Brânceni (4)	3–1 (a.e.t.)	Universitatea II Craiova (3)
Unirea Tărlungeni (2)	5–0	Gloria Buzău (2)
CS Păulești (4)	2–3	FC Brașov (2)
Metaloglobus București (3)	0–1	CS Balotești (2)
ACS Berceni (2)	1–0	Rapid București (2)
Ripensia Timișoara (4)	2–0	CS Ineu (3)
Bucovina Pojorâta (2)	w/o	FCM Dorohoi (2)

== Round of 32 ==
The matches were played on 22, 23, and 24 September 2015.

Team 1	Score	Team 2
22 September 2015
UTA Arad (2)	1–1 (a.e.t.) (1–3 p)	Pandurii Târgu Jiu
CS Balotești (2)	0–1 (a.e.t.)	CFR Cluj
Bucovina Pojorâta (2)	1–4	ASA Târgu Mureș
Viitorul II Constanța (3)	2–1	Academica Clinceni (2)
ACS Berceni (2)	1–1 (a.e.t.) (2–4 p)	CSM Studențesc Iași
CSM Râmnicu Vâlcea (2)	0–2	ACS Poli Timișoara
23 September 2015
SC Bacău (2)	1–1 (a.e.t.) (5–3 p)	Universitatea Craiova
Unirea Brânceni (4)	0–5	Astra Giurgiu
CS Mioveni (2)	1–2	FC Botoșani
Rapid CFR Suceava (2)	0–2	FC Brașov (2)
FCM Baia Mare (2)	1–0	FC Voluntari
Unirea Tărlungeni (2)	0–6	Petrolul Ploiești
Ripensia Timișoara (4)	0–2	Viitorul Constanța
24 September 2015
Dacia Unirea Brăila (2)	2–3	Dinamo București
ASA II Târgu Mureș (4)	0–4	Concordia Chiajna
Universitatea Cluj (2)	0–1	Steaua București

=== Results ===
22 September 2015	UTA Arad	1–1 (a.e.t.) (1–3 p)	Pandurii Târgu Jiu	Arad
16:00	Curtuiuș 87'		Săpunaru 10'	Stadium: Motorul; Attendance: 1,000; Referee: Cătălin Buși (Râmnicu Vâlcea)
	Penalties
	Manea (penalty missed); Vlad (penalty missed); Burlă (penalty scored); Hlistei (penalty missed)		Nistor (penalty scored); Mrzljak (penalty missed); Ungurușan (penalty scored); Nicoară (penalty scored)

22 September 2015	CS Balotești	0–1 (a.e.t.)	CFR Cluj	Balotești
16:30			Beleck 112'	Stadium: Central; Attendance: 700; Referee: Iulian Călin (Ștefănești)

22 September 2015	Bucovina Pojorâta	1–4	ASA Târgu Mureș	Pojorâta
16:30	Căinari 88'		Manolov 2', 72'; Mureșan 29'; Axente 82'	Stadium: Pojorâta; Attendance: 400; Referee: Marian Barbu (Făgăraș)

22 September 2015	Viitorul II Constanța	2–1	Academica Clinceni	Ovidiu
16:30	Marin 47'; Grecu 79'		Kuku 41'	Stadium: Orășenesc; Attendance: 300; Referee: Horia Mladinovici (Bucharest)

22 September 2015	ACS Berceni	1–1 (a.e.t.) (2–4 p)	CSM Studențesc Iași	Berceni
18:00	Dobre 6'		Golubović 90+4'	Stadium: Berceni; Attendance: 300; Referee: Marian Balaci (Drobeta-Turnu Severin)
	Penalties
	Neagu (penalty scored); Dobre (penalty missed); Fâșie (penalty missed); Cioranu (penalty scored)		Golubović (penalty missed); Enescu (penalty scored); Gheorghe (penalty scored); Piccioni (penalty scored); Mihalache (penalty scored)

22 September 2015	CSM Râmnicu Vâlcea	0–2	ACS Poli Timișoara	Pitești
20:00			Curtean 6'; Llorente 27'	Stadium: Nicolae Dobrin; Attendance: 700; Referee: Adrian Illyes (Ploiești)

23 September 2015	SC Bacău	1–1 (a.e.t.) (5–3 p)	Universitatea Craiova	Bacău
17:00	Pavel 3'		Măzărache 43'	Stadium: Letea; Attendance: 1,000; Referee: Andrei Chivulete (Bucharest)
	Penalties
	Vraciu (penalty scored); Neagu (penalty scored); Adăscăliței (penalty scored); Drugă (penalty scored); Hurdubei (penalty scored)		Vătăjelu (penalty scored); Ivan (penalty missed); Popov (penalty scored); Băluță (penalty scored)

23 September 2015	Unirea Brânceni	0–5	Astra Giurgiu	Brânceni
16:30			Roșu 1', 87', 89'; Enache 44'; Alibec 71'	Stadium: Comunal; Attendance: 1,500; Referee: Antonie Andrei (Bucharest)

23 September 2015	CS Mioveni	1–2	FC Botoșani	Mioveni
16:30	Popa 71'		D.Roman 38'; G.Cabrera 80'	Stadium: Orășenesc; Attendance: 2,000; Referee: Eduard Ioniță (Constanța)

23 September 2015	Rapid CFR Suceava	0–2	FC Brașov	Suceava
16:30			Ene 75'; Letan 81'	Stadium: Areni; Attendance: 3,000; Referee: Florin Andrei (Târgu Mureș)

23 September 2015	FCM Baia Mare	1–0	FC Voluntari	Baia Mare
16:30	Codin 88'			Stadium: Viorel Mateianu; Attendance: 4,000; Referee: Ovidiu Mazilu (Satu Mare)

23 September 2015	Unirea Tărlungeni	0–6	Petrolul Ploiești	Brașov
20:00			Benga 30'; Tamuz 38', 90'; Varga 47'; Milinceanu 79'; Lemnaru 84'	Stadium: Silviu Ploeșteanu; Attendance: 300; Referee: Ionuț Coza (Cernica)

23 September 2015	Ripensia Timișoara	0–2	Viitorul Constanța	Timișoara
20:00			Mișelăricu 15'; Tănase 90'	Stadium: Dan Păltinișanu; Attendance: 1,500; Referee: Florin Marcu (Oradea)

24 September 2015	Dacia Unirea Brăila	2–3	Dinamo București	Brăila
16:30	Necoară 40'; Muscă 86'		Gnohéré 62', 73', 75'	Stadium: Municipal; Attendance: 7,000; Referee: Adrian Cojocaru (Galați)

24 September 2015	ASA II Târgu Mureș	0–4	Concordia Chiajna	Târgu Mureș
16:30			Purece 12'; Răducanu 32'; Constantinescu 62'; Pană 85'	Stadium: Trans-Sil; Attendance: 500; Referee: Flavius Roșu (Timișoara)

24 September 2015	Universitatea Cluj	0–1	Steaua București	Cluj-Napoca
20:30			Tahar 81'	Stadium: Cluj Arena; Attendance: 10,000; Referee: Denis Haidiner (Hunedoara)

== Round of 16 ==
All matches were played on October 27, 28 and 29, 2015.

Team 1	Score	Team 2
27 October 2015
FC Brașov (2)	3–4 (a.e.t.)	Astra Giurgiu
Concordia Chiajna	1–2	CSM Studențesc Iași
ACS Poli Timișoara	2–1	Petrolul Ploiești
28 October 2015
SC Bacău (2)	0–1	ASA Târgu Mureș
Viitorul II Constanța (3)	0–1	CFR Cluj
Pandurii Târgu Jiu	2–3	Dinamo București
29 October 2015
Viitorul Constanța	1–0	FC Botoșani
FCM Baia Mare (2)	1–1 (a.e.t.) (1–4 p)	Steaua București

=== Results ===
27 October 2015	FC Brașov	3–4 (a.e.t.)	Astra Giurgiu	Brașov
17:00	Matei 67', 90'; Olteanu 88'		Tembo 18'; Budescu 28'; Ioniță 35'; Dandea 118'	Stadium: Silviu Ploeșteanu; Attendance: 600; Referee: Iulian Dima (Bucharest)

27 October 2015	Concordia Chiajna	1–2	CSM Studențesc Iași	Chiajna
19:00	Răsdan 27'		Bădic 50'; Frăsinescu 70'	Stadium: Concordia; Attendance: 1,500; Referee: Cătălin Popa (Pitești)

27 October 2015	ACS Poli Timișoara	2–1	Petrolul Ploiești	Timișoara
21:00	Hernández 40' (pen.); Cânu 84'		Velasco 70'	Stadium: Dan Păltinișanu; Attendance: 1,000; Referee: Marius Avram (Bucharest)

28 October 2015	SC Bacău	0–1	ASA Târgu Mureș	Bacău
16:00			Gorobsov 56' (pen.)	Stadium: Letea; Attendance: 1,800; Referee: Marian Balaci (Drobeta-Turnu Severin)

28 October 2015	Viitorul II Constanța	0–1	CFR Cluj	Ovidiu
18:00			Negruț 55'	Stadium: Viitorul; Attendance: 500; Referee: Andrei Antonie (Bucharest)

28 October 2015	Pandurii Târgu Jiu	2–3	Dinamo București	Drobeta-Turnu Severin
20:30	Hora 13'; Nedelcearu 31' (o.g.)		Nedelcearu 8'; Rotariu 51'; Vojnović 90+1'	Stadium: Municipal; Attendance: 1,500; Referee: Ovidiu Hațegan (Arad)

29 October 2015	Viitorul Constanța	1–0	FC Botoșani	Ovidiu
18:00	Ganea 51'			Stadium: Viitorul; Attendance: 500; Referee: Adrian Cojocaru (Galați)

29 October 2015	FCM Baia Mare	1–1 (a.e.t.) (1–4 p)	Steaua București	Baia Mare
20:30	Păcurar 11'		Tadé 27' (pen.)	Stadium: Viorel Mateianu; Attendance: 14,000; Referee: Florin Marcu (Oradea)
	Penalties
	Pop (penalty missed); Deac (penalty scored); Străuț (penalty missed)		Tadé (penalty scored); Chipciu (penalty scored); Varela (penalty scored); Carp (penalty scored)

== Quarter-finals ==
The matches were played on 15, 16, and 17 December 2015.

Team 1	Score	Team 2
15 December 2015
ACS Poli Timișoara	1–1 (a.e.t.) (6–7 p)	ASA Târgu Mureș
Dinamo București	2–1	Astra Giurgiu
16 December 2015
CSM Studențesc Iași	1–2	CFR Cluj
17 December 2015
Viitorul Constanța	0–1	Steaua București

=== Results ===
15 December 2015	ACS Poli Timișoara	1–1 (a.e.t.) (6–7 p)	ASA Târgu Mureș	Timișoara
18:00	Elek 24'		Balić 80'	Stadium: Dan Păltinișanu; Referee: Cristian Balaj (Baia Mare)
	Penalties
	Elek (penalty scored); Curtean (penalty scored); Llorente (penalty scored); Sarmov (penalty scored); Melinte (penalty scored); Popescu (penalty scored); Artean (penalty missed)		González (penalty scored); Gorobsov (penalty scored); Velayos (penalty scored); Borza (penalty scored); Romario (penalty scored); Balić (penalty scored); Manolov (penalty scored)

15 December 2015	Dinamo București	2–1	Astra Giurgiu	Bucharest
20:30	Gnohéré 17'; Palić 90+4'		Enache 90+2'	Stadium: Stadionul Dinamo; Referee: Horațiu Feșnic (Cluj-Napoca)

16 December 2015	CSM Studențesc Iași	1–2	CFR Cluj	Iași
20:30	Gheorghe 77'		Păun 55'; Beleck 83'	Stadium: Emil Alexandrescu; Referee: István Kovács (Carei)

17 December 2015	Viitorul Constanța	0–1	Steaua București	Ovidiu
20:30			Stanciu 48'	Stadium: Viitorul; Referee: Radu Petrescu (Bucharest)

== Semi-finals ==
The semi-final matches are played in a round-trip system. The first legs were played on 2 and 3 March 2016 and the return legs were played on 20 and 21 April 2016.

Team 1	Agg.	Team 2	1st leg	2nd leg
ASA Târgu Mureș (1)	0–2	CFR Cluj (1)	0–0	0–2
Dinamo București (1)	2–2 (a)	Steaua București (1)	0–0	2–2

=== 1st leg ===
2 March 2016	ASA Târgu Mureș	0–0	CFR Cluj	Târgu Mureș
20:30				Stadium: Trans-Sil; Referee: Marcel Bârsan (Bucharest)

3 March 2016	Dinamo București	0–0	Steaua București	Bucharest
20:30				Stadium: Dinamo; Referee: Radu Petrescu (Bucharest)

=== 2nd leg ===
20 April 2016	Steaua București	2–2 (2–2 agg.)	Dinamo București	Bucharest
21:30	Enache 17'; Chipciu 52'		Ekeng 51'; Puljić 75'	Stadium: Arena Națională; Referee: Cristian Balaj (Baia Mare)

21 April 2016	CFR Cluj	2–0 (2–0 agg.)	ASA Târgu Mureș	Cluj-Napoca
20:30	Bud 17', 70'			Stadium: Dr. Constantin Rădulescu; Referee: István Kovács (Carei)

== Final ==
17 May 2016	Dinamo București	2–2 (a.e.t.) (4–5 p)	CFR Cluj	Bucharest
21:30	Gnohéré 23' (pen.); Bicfalvi 36'		Juan Carlos 47'; Cristian 89'	Stadium: Arena Națională; Attendance: 40,000; Referee: Ovidiu Hațegan (Arad)
	Penalties
	Bicfalvi (penalty scored); Gnohéré (penalty scored); Anton (penalty scored); Lazăr (penalty scored); Rotariu (penalty missed)		(penalty scored) Cristian; (penalty scored) Lopes; (penalty scored) Beleck; (penalty scored) Petrucci; (penalty scored) Juan Carlos

Cupa României 2015–16 winners

4th title
