= Bonda (river) =

- Location within Romania

Location
- Country: Romania
- Counties: Bihor County
- Villages: Bălaia, Botean, Ineu, Husasău de Criş

Physical characteristics
- Mouth: Crișul Repede
  - location: Fughiu
  - coordinates: 47.0599°N 22.0384°E
- Length: 11 km (6.8 mi)
- Basin size: 24 km^{2} (9.3 sq mi)

Basin features
- Progression: Crișul Repede→ Körös→ Tisza→ Danube→ Black Sea

The Bonda is a right tributary of the river Crișul Repede in Romania. It discharges into the Crișul Repede in Fughiu. Its length is 11 km (6.8 mi) and its basin size is 24 km^{2} (9.3 sq mi).
