= Sorin Cigan =

Romanian footballer (born 1964)

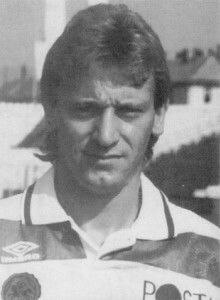
- Cigan while playing for Ferencváros

Personal information
- Date of birth: 29 May 1964 (age 62)
- Place of birth: Tușnad, Romania
- Height: 1.80 m (5 ft 11 in)
- Position: Striker

Team information
- Current team: Füzesgyarmat (assistant)

Senior career*
Years	Team	Apps	(Gls)
1981–1987	Bihor Oradea	42	(3)
1984–1985	→ UTA Arad (loan)		
1988–1990	Brașov	67	(15)
1989	→ Victoria București	12	(2)
1990	Bihor Oradea	14	(1)
1991	Szeged	14	(6)
1991–1992	Újpest	24	(5)
1992–1993	Ferencváros	19	(3)
1994	Vasas	5	(2)
1994	Stadler Akasztó	7	(0)
1995	Kabai Cukor	13	(5)
1995–1996	Matáv Sopron		
1996–1997	Szeged	6	(1)
Total		223	(43)

International career
1988	Romania Olympic	1	(0)
1989	Romania	1	(0)

Managerial career
- 2002–2003: Tricotaje Ineu
- 2003: UTA Arad
- 2004: Tricotaje Ineu
- 2006–2007: Arieșul Turda
- 2007: Stăruința Săcueni
- 2008: Avântul Reghin
- 2010: Liberty Salonta
- 2010: Viitorul Popești
- 2011: Tricolorul Alparea
- 2012: Bihorul Beiuș
- 2013: Europa Alba Iulia
- 2013–2014: Sighetu Marmației
- 2020–: Füzesgyarmat
- * Club domestic league appearances and goals

Sorin Cigan (born 29 May 1964) is a Romanian football manager and former player who played as a striker. In Romania he played mostly for Bihor Oradea, but he had his best seasons at Brașov, then he played out his career in Hungary, where he was a well known player, playing along his career for Budapest most important clubs Ferencváros and Újpest among other clubs.

His son, Cristian Cigan is also a footballer.

In June 2009 Cigan was involved in a scandal of match fixing, he was accused of receiving money from ACU Arad to convince Bihor Oradea players to let ACU win. In 2013 he was convicted at three years of suspended sentence.

== Honours ==
Újpest

- Magyar Kupa: 1991–92

Ferencváros

- Magyar Kupa: 1992–93, 1993–94
