= Gomo Onduku =

Nigerian footballer

Personal information
- Full name: Richard Gomo Onduku
- Date of birth: 17 November 1993 (age 32)
- Place of birth: Ekeremor, Nigeria
- Height: 1.81 m (5 ft 11 in)
- Position: Forward

Team information
- Current team: Abia Warriors

Senior career*
Years	Team	Apps	(Gls)
2011–2012	Sharks		
2012–2013	Bayelsa United	5	(2)
2013–2014	Concordia Chiajna	30	(3)
2014–2016	Politehnica Iași	28	(1)
2016–2017	Wydad Casablanca	0	(0)
2016–2017	→ RS Berkane (loan)	12	(1)
2018	Ilves	5	(1)
2019–	Abia Warriors		

International career
2013	Nigeria	2	(0)
- * Club domestic league appearances and goals as of 9 May 2018

Gomo Onduku (born 17 November 1993 in Ekeremor) is a Nigerian footballer who plays as a forward for Abia Warriors. He played in Romania for Concordia Chiajna and CSMS Iași and in Morocco for Nehdat Berkane.

== Career statistics ==
As of 13 May 2025

Appearances and goals by club, season and competition
Club	Season	League			National cup		Other		Total	
Club	Season	Division	Apps	Goals	Apps	Goals	Apps	Goals	Apps	Goals
Bayelsa United	2013	Nigeria Premier League	5	2	–		–		5	2
Concordia Chiajna	2013–14	Liga I	30	3	1	0	–		31	3
Politehnica Iași	2014–15	Liga I	16	1	1	0	1 (Note: Includes Cupa Ligii)	0	18	1
Politehnica Iași	2015–16	Liga I	13	0	1	0	–		14	0
Politehnica Iași	Total		29	1	2	0	1	0	32	1
Wydad Casablanca	2016–17	Botola	0	0	0	0	0	0	0	0
RS Berkane (loan)	2016–17	Botola	12	1	0	0	–		12	1
Ilves	2018	Veikkausliiga	5	1	0	0	–		5	1
Abia Warriors	2019–20	NPFL	1	0	–		–		1	0
Career total			82	8	3	0	1	0	86	8
