= Mugurel Dedu =

Romanian footballer

Personal information
- Full name: Alexandru Mugurel Dedu
- Date of birth: 1 March 1985 (age 41)
- Place of birth: Câmpina, România
- Height: 1.77 m (5 ft 10 in)
- Position: Attacking midfielder

Youth career
- 2004–2005: Poiana Câmpina

Senior career*
Years	Team	Apps	(Gls)
2005	Jiul Petroșani	5	(0)
2005–2006	Precizia Săcele	6	(0)
2006–2010	Pandurii Târgu Jiu	18	(0)
2007–2008	→ Râmnicu Vâlcea (loan)	9	(0)
2010–2013	Otopeni	55	(6)
2013–2014	Politehnica Iași	32	(1)
2014–2016	Gloria Buzău	37	(6)
2017–2022	Afumați	80	(47)
Total		242	(60)
- * Club domestic league appearances and goals as of 11:12, 9 November 2022 (UTC)

Alexandru Mugurel Dedu (born 1 March 1985) is a Romanian former footballer who played as an attacking midfielder or forward for teams such as Pandurii Târgu Jiu, CS Otopeni, Politehnica Iași, Gloria Buzău or CS Afumați, among others.

== Honours ==
CS Afumați

- Liga III: 2020–21, 2021–22
