= Stadionul Comunal (Alparea) =

Soccer stadium in Apparel, Romania

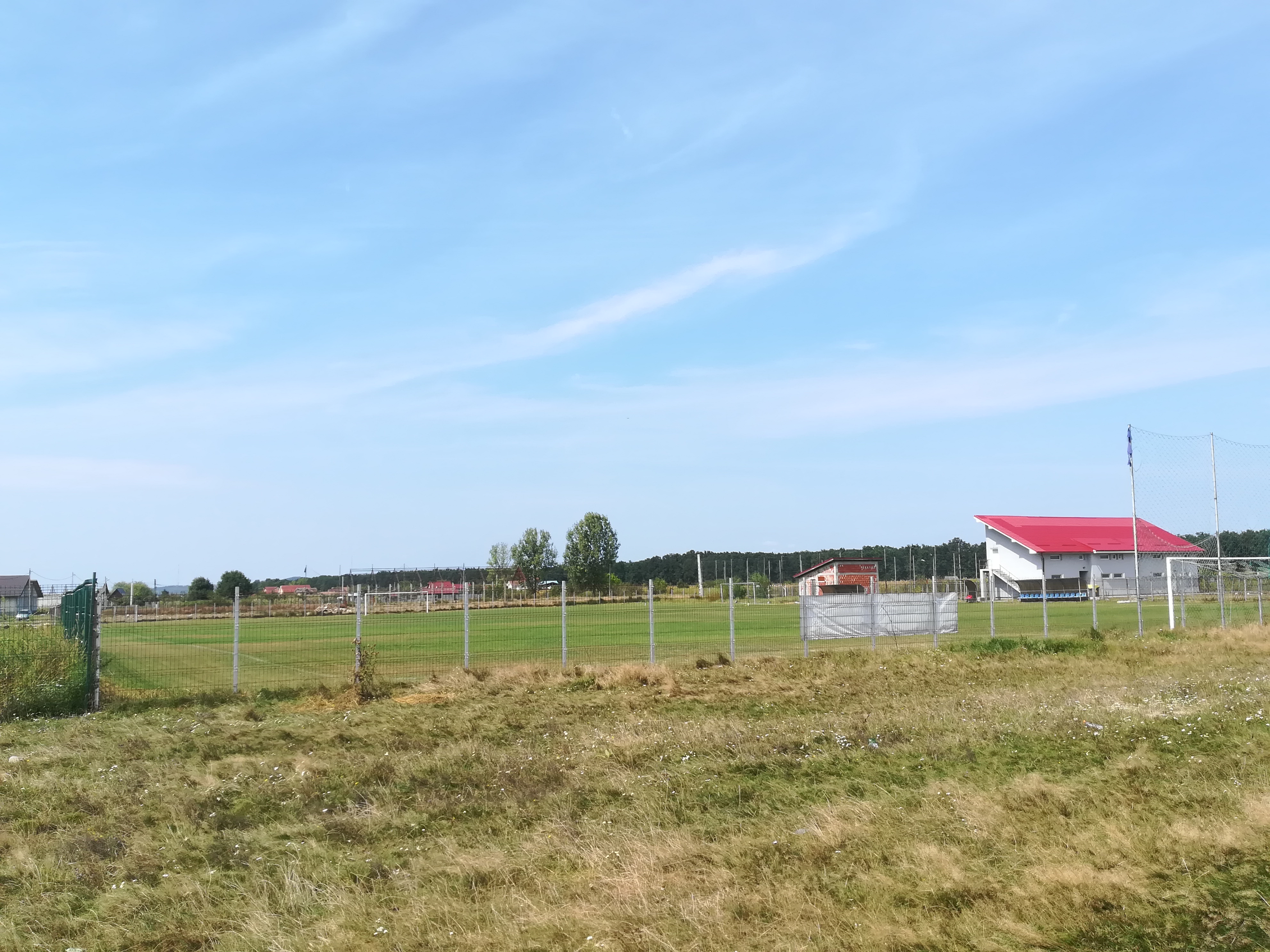
- Interactive map of Stadionul Comunal
- Address: DJ767E
- Location: Alparea, Romania
- Coordinates: 47°01′47″N 22°04′06.6″E
- Owner: Commune of Oșorhei
- Operator: CS Oșorhei
- Capacity: 500 (0 seated)
- Surface: Grass

Construction
- Opened: 2000
- Renovated: 2012–2014
- Expanded: 2012–2014

Tenant
- CS Oșorhei (2000–present)

Stadionul Comunal is a multi-use stadium in Alparea, Romania. It is used mostly for football matches and is the home ground of CS Oșorhei. The stadium holds 500 people.

== Gallery ==
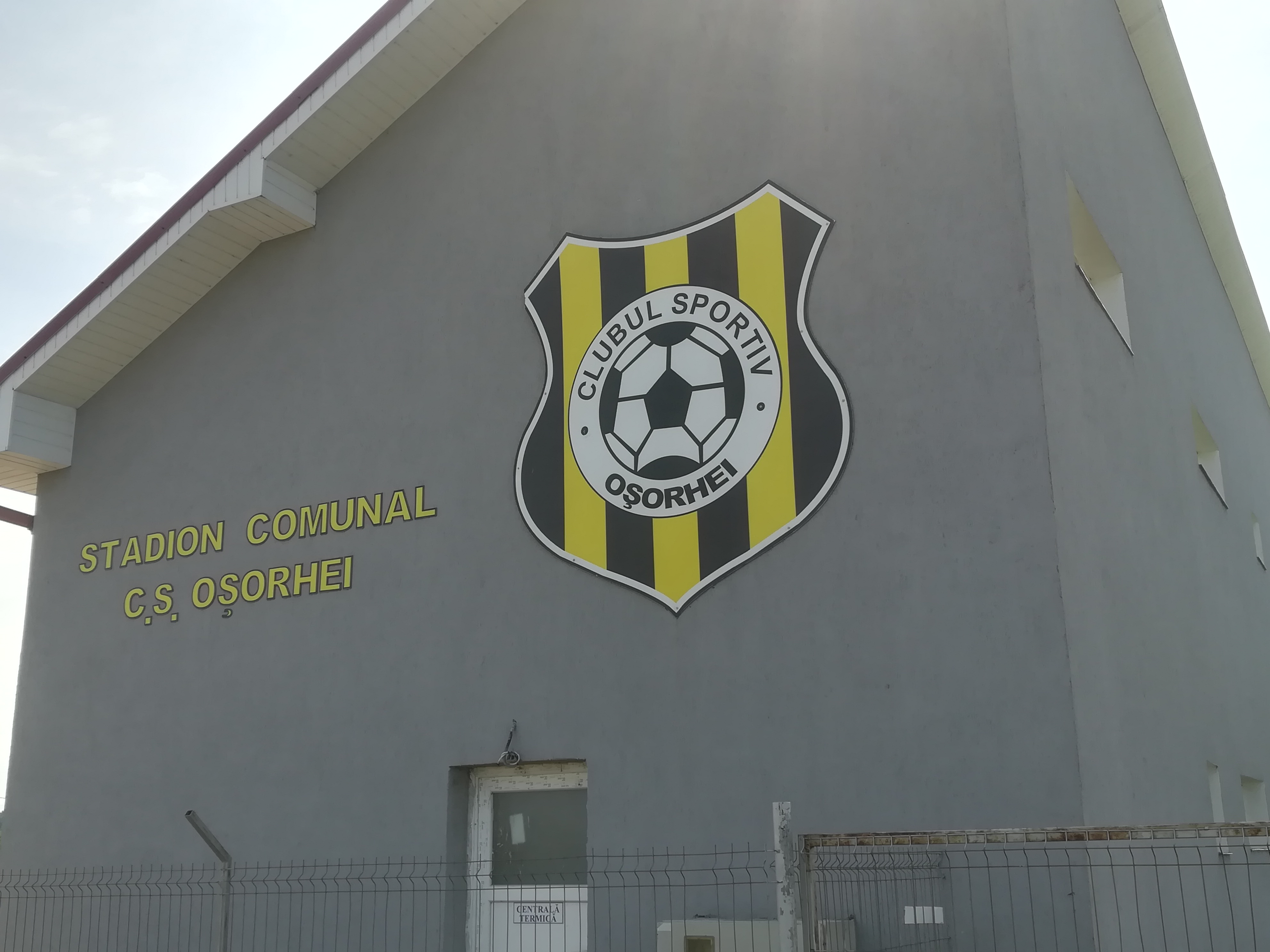
Stadium entry.

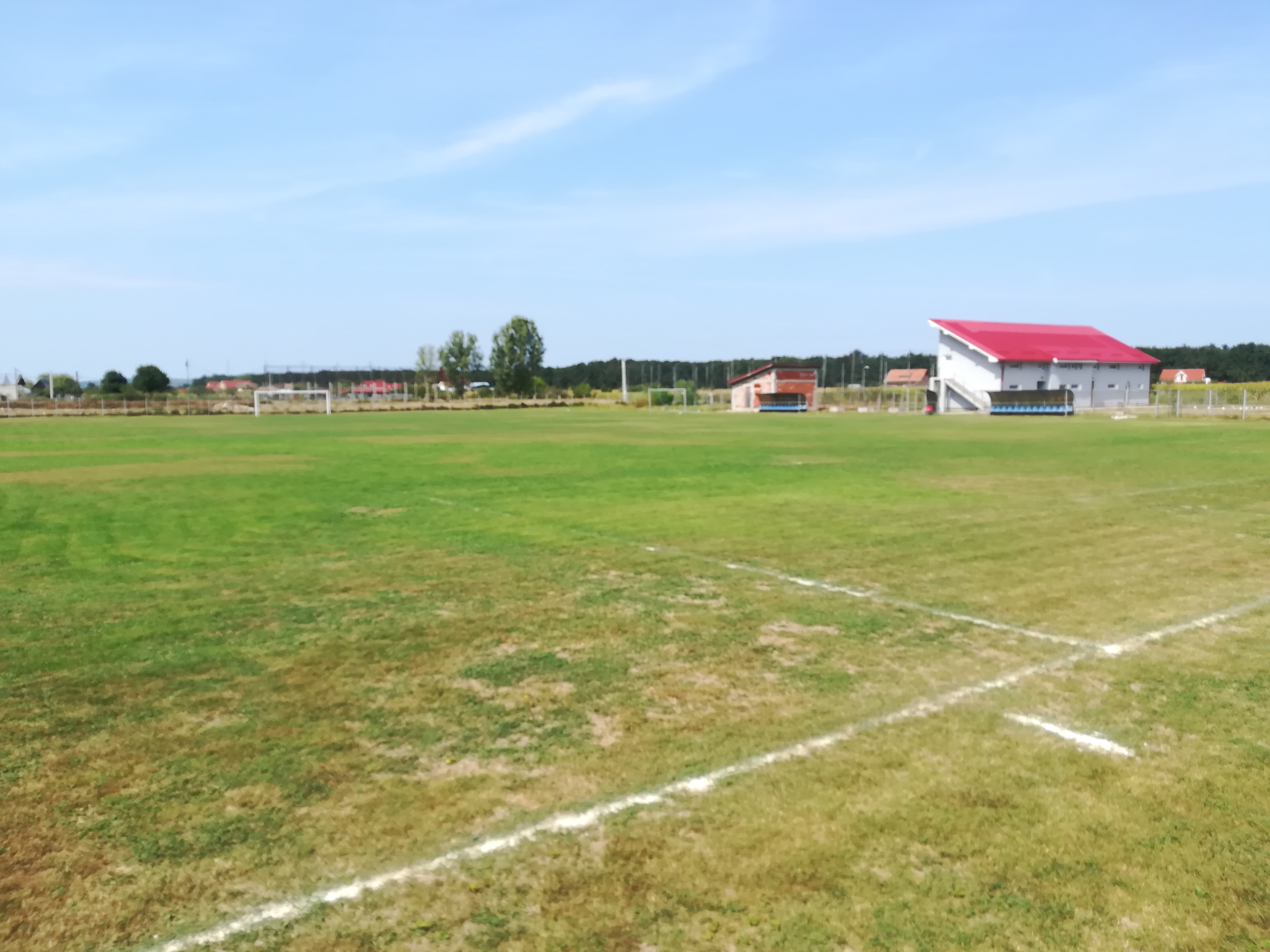
View of the ground.
