= Leonard Dobre =

Romanian professional football player

Personal information
- Date of birth: 16 June 1992 (age 34)
- Place of birth: Bucharest, Romania
- Height: 1.85 m (6 ft 1 in)
- Position: Striker

Youth career
- 2002–2008: Sportul Studenţesc

Senior career*
Years	Team	Apps	(Gls)
2008–2013	Sportul Studențesc	60	(4)
2013–2014	CSMS Iași	36	(6)
2015	Spartak Varna	?	(?)
2015–2016	Berceni	22	(3)
2016–2017	Viitorul Domnești	?	(?)
2017	Sportul Snagov	18	(1)
2018–2019	Popești-Leordeni		

International career^{‡}
2012	Romania U-21	4	(0)
- * Club domestic league appearances and goals as of 18 February 2018 ‡ National team caps and goals as of 13 November 2012

Leonard Dobre (born 16 June 1992, Bucharest) is a Romanian professional football player who plays as a striker.
