= Milan Mitić =

Serbian footballer

Personal information
- Date of birth: 22 January 1984 (age 42)
- Place of birth: Belgrade, Serbia
- Height: 1.87 m (6 ft 2 in)
- Positions: Defensive midfielder; right back

Senior career*
Years	Team	Apps	(Gls)
2007–2009	Drobeta	70	(4)
2010	Sticla Arieșul Turda		
2010–2012	Turnu Severin	54	(4)
2013	Politehnica Iași	10	(0)
2013	U Craiova 1948	13	(0)
2014–2017	Politehnica Iași	85	(0)
2017–2018	Gaz Metan	12	(0)
Total		244	(8)
- * Club domestic league appearances and goals as of 3 June 2018

Milan Mitić (Serbian: Милан Митић) (born 22 January 1984 in Belgrade) is a Serbian retired footballer who played as a defensive midfielder or as a right back.
