= Oșorhei =

Oșorhei Fugyivásárhely
- Commune
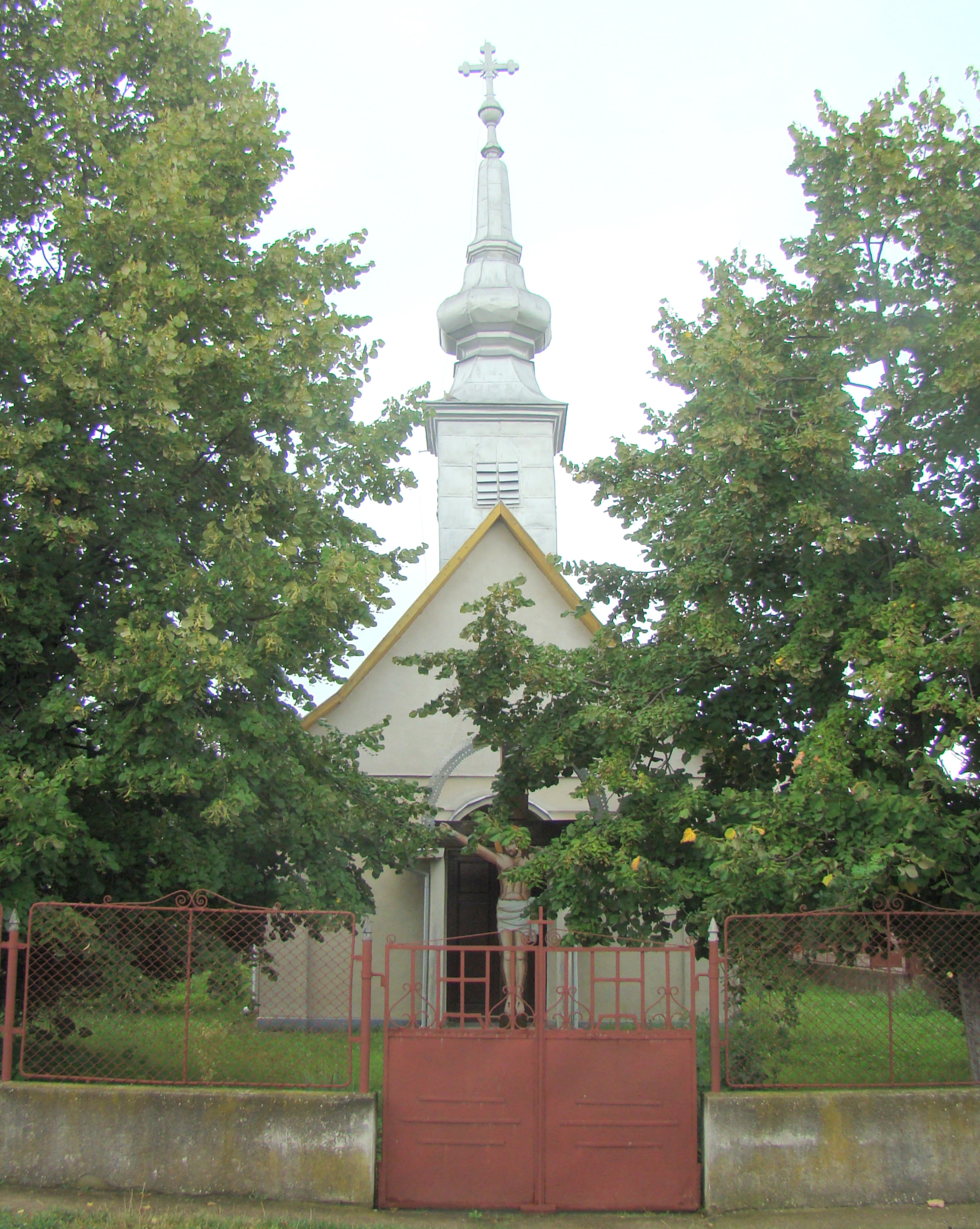
- Dormition of the Theotokos Church in Oșorhei

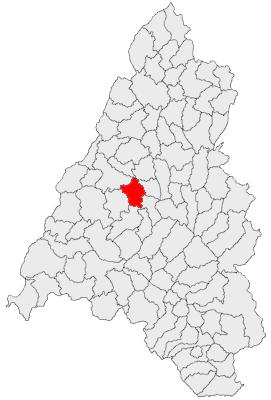
- Location in Bihor County

- Location in Romania
- Coordinates: 47.05°N 22.0167°E
- Country: Romania
- County: Bihor

Government
  - Mayor (2020–2024): Ioan Gligor (PNL)
- Area: 64.92 km^{2} (25.07 sq mi)
- Elevation: 146 m (479 ft)
- Population (2021-12-01): 8,536
  - Density: 131.5/km^{2} (340.5/sq mi)
- Time zone: UTC+02:00 (EET)
  - Summer (DST): UTC+03:00 (EEST)
- Postal code: 417360
- Area code: +40 x59
- Vehicle reg.: BH
- Website: primaria-osorhei.ro

Oșorhei (Hungarian: Fugyivásárhely) is a commune in Bihor County, Crișana, Romania with a population of 8,536 people as of 2021. It is composed of five villages: Alparea (Váradalpár), Cheriu (Alkér), Felcheriu (Felkér), Fughiu (Fugyi), and Oșorhei.

The commune is located in the central part of Bihor County, 10 km (6.2 mi) east of the county seat, Oradea. It lies on the left bank of the river Crișul Repede; the river Bonda discharges into the Crișul Repede in Fughiu.

Oșorhei is crossed by national road DN1, which connects Bucharest to Oradea, ending at the Hungary–Romania border in Borș. The Oșorhei train station serves the CFR Main Line 300, which also runs from Bucharest to the Hungarian border.

The football club CS Oșorhei, founded in 2000, plays in Liga IV; its home grounds is Stadionul Comunal, located in Alparea.
