= Stadionul Francisc Matei =

Multi-use stadium in Beiuș, Romania

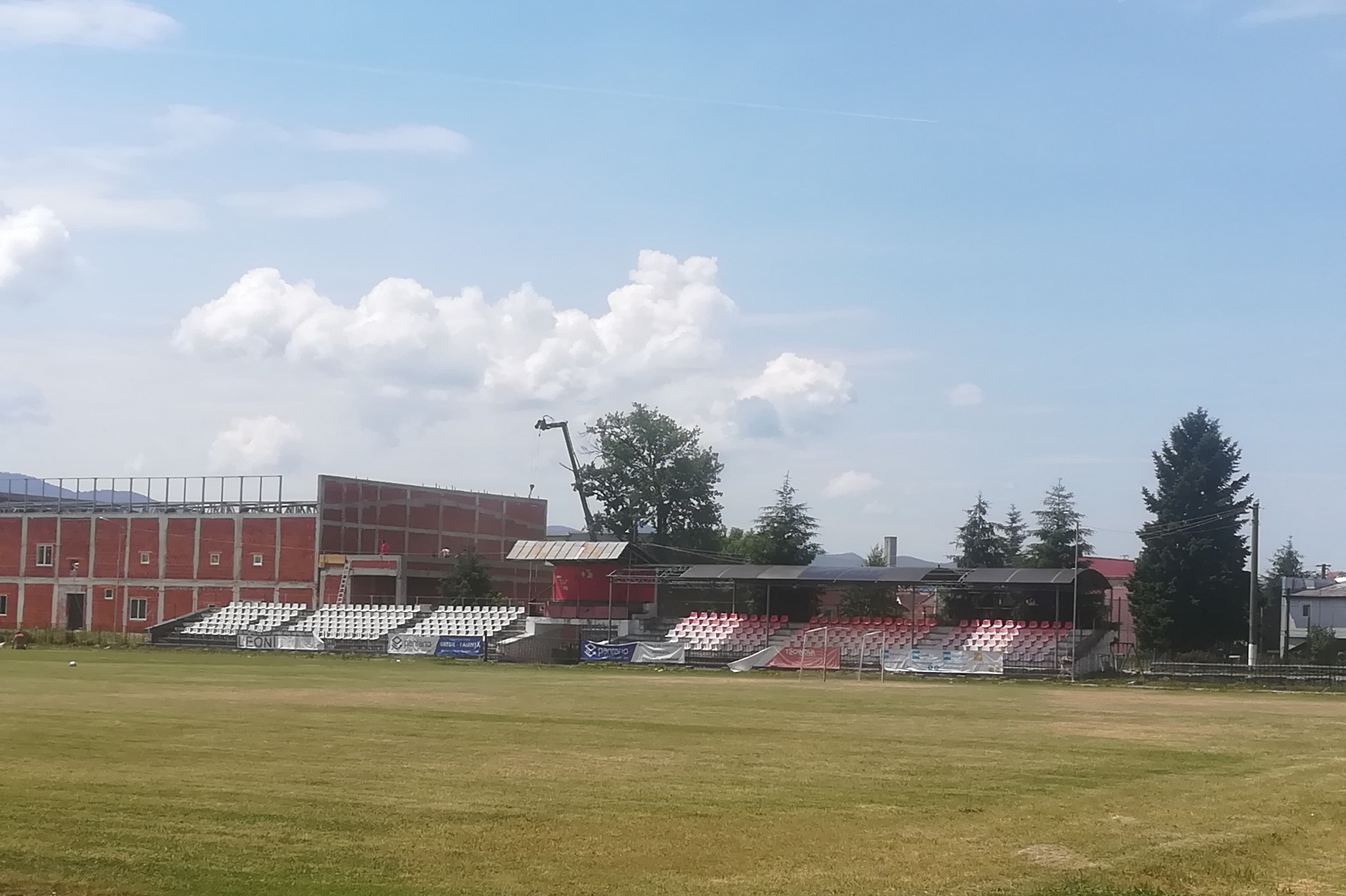
- Interactive map of Stadionul Francisc Matei
- Former names: Municipal (2004–2014)
- Location: Beiuș, Romania
- Coordinates: 46°40′15.5″N 22°21′32.1″E
- Owner: Beiuș Municipality
- Operator: Bihorul Beiuș
- Capacity: 900 on seats
- Surface: artificial turf

Construction
- Opened: 1921
- Renovated: 2016, 2022–2025
- Expanded: 2022–2025

Tenant
- Bihorul Beiuș (1921–present)

Stadionul Francisc Matei is a multi-use stadium in Beiuș, Romania. It is used mostly for football matches and is the home ground of Bihorul Beiuș. Between 2022 and 2025 the stadium was undergoing a major modernization process carried out by the National Investment Company (CNI), the pitch was replaced with an artificial turf, a floodlight system was installed and the capacity was increased from 400 seats to 900 seats by adding a second stand of 500 seats. A new building for changing rooms and offices was also built, in addition to the existing one.
