= Kevin Trabalka =

Romanian footballer

Personal information
- Full name: Kevin Robert Trabalka
- Date of birth: 28 November 1996 (age 29)
- Place of birth: Arad, Romania
- Height: 1.84 m (6 ft 1/2 in)
- Position: Striker

Team information
- Current team: Unirea Sântana
- Number: 99

Senior career*
Years	Team	Apps	(Gls)
2013–2014	UTA Arad	7	(1)
2014–2016	Dinamo București	1	(0)
2015	→ Bihor Oradea (loan)	12	(1)
2016	→ Râmnicu Vâlcea (loan)	0	(0)
2016	UTA II Arad	2	(0)
2017–2019	Șoimii Lipova	56	(38)
2019–2020	FC U Craiova	7	(1)
2021	Șoimii Lipova	13	(6)
2022–	Unirea Sântana	0	(0)
- * Club domestic league appearances and goals as of 13:50, 12 April 2022 (UTC)

Kevin Robert Trabalka (born 28 November 1996) is a Romanian footballer who plays as a striker for Unirea Sântana.

== Honours ==
Șoimii Lipova

- Liga III: 2020–21
