= Alexandru Ciucur =

Romanian professional footballer

Personal information
- Full name: Alexandru Teofil Ciucur
- Date of birth: 1 March 1990 (age 36)
- Place of birth: Dorohoi, Romania
- Height: 1.78 m (5 ft 10 in)
- Position: Winger

Youth career
- 1999–2006: LPS Suceava
- 2006–2008: Ardealul Cluj

Senior career*
Years	Team	Apps	(Gls)
2008–2010	Internațional Curtea de Argeș	25	(3)
2009–2010	→ Râmnicu Vâlcea (loan)	?	(?)
2010–2016	Pandurii Târgu Jiu	53	(2)
2011	→ Mioveni (loan)	10	(0)
2011–2013	→ CSMS Iași (loan)	47	(6)
2014–2015	→ CSMS Iași (loan)	31	(3)
2016–2017	Politehnica Iași	31	(2)
2017–2018	ACS Poli Timișoara	37	(3)
2018	Voluntari	15	(0)
2019–2020	UTA Arad	20	(2)
2020–2021	Dunărea Călărași	23	(2)
2022–2024	Afumați	45	(8)
- * Club domestic league appearances and goals as of 13:50, 11 January 2024 (UTC)

Alexandru Ciucur (born 1 March 1990) is a Romanian former professional footballer who played as a right winger.

== Club career ==
=== Internațional Curtea de Argeș ===
Ciucur was an important member of the team in the 2008–09 season when he helped Internațional Curtea de Argeș earn promotion to the Liga I. In his second season with the team, he did not see too much action.

=== Pandurii Târgu Jiu and loans ===
Searching more play time he joined Liga I side Pandurii Târgu Jiu. He did not make a breakthrough playing just one game in six months.

He was loaned for the second half of the 2010–11 season to Liga II side CS Mioveni.

In the summer of 2011 Ciucur joined Politehnica Iași. He finished the 11–12 season in an emphatic manner, scoring very important goals to help Politehnica gain promotion to the Liga I.

In 2013 Pandurii coach, Cristi Pustai, put an end to the loan periods, and offer Ciucur a starting role in the squad. He made his debut in the Europa League after the club finished as Liga I runners-up. On 29 August 2013, Ciucur scored the decisive goal against the Portuguese club SC Braga to make sure Pandurii Targu Jiu progressed to Europa League group stage for the first time in their history.

== Honours ==
CSMS Iași

- Liga II: 2011–12

UTA Arad

- Liga II: 2019–20

CS Afumați

- Liga III: 2021–22
