= Florin Plămadă =

Romanian footballer

Personal information
- Full name: Florin Constantin Plămadă
- Date of birth: 30 April 1992 (age 34)
- Place of birth: Rădăuți, Romania
- Height: 1.85 m (6 ft 1 in)
- Position: Centre back

Youth career
- –2009: LPS Suceava

Senior career*
Years	Team	Apps	(Gls)
2009–2013	Rapid CFR Suceava	22	(0)
2009–2010	→ Petrolul Ploiești (loan)	11	(0)
2011	→ Otopeni (loan)	1	(0)
2013–2018	Botoșani	52	(1)
2013	→ Rapid CFR Suceava (loan)	13	(1)
2014–2015	→ CSMS Iași (loan)	37	(2)
2018–2019	Petrolul Ploiești	15	(1)
2019–2020	Metaloglobus București	32	(1)
2020–2021	Botoșani	5	(0)
2021–2023	Politehnica Iași	42	(2)
2023–2024	Chindia Târgoviște	20	(0)
2024–2025	Șomuz Fălticeni	0	(0)

International career
2013	Romania U21	2	(0)
- * Club domestic league appearances and goals as of 09:04, 4 December 2024 (UTC)

Florin Constantin Plămadă (born 30 April 1992) is a Romanian professional footballer who plays as a centre back.

== Club career ==
=== Politehnica Iași ===
After some impressive performances for Foresta Suceava in the beginning of the 2013–14 season, Politehnica Iași secured the loan of Plămadă for the rest of the campaign.

In June 2013, after Politehnica Iași secured the promotion from Liga II, Plămadă prolonged his loan for another year so he cold make his debut in the Liga I.

== Personal life ==
Florin's older brother Ionuț is also a footballer who spent most of his career in the Romanian second division Liga II, they played together at Rapid CFR Suceava.

== Honours ==
Rapid CFR Suceava

- Liga III: 2011–12

Politehnica Iași

- Liga II: 2013–14, 2022–23
