= Ineu, Bihor =

Ineu
- Commune
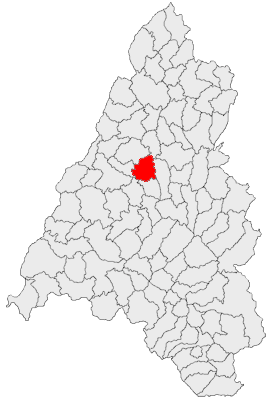
- Location in Bihor County

- Location in Romania
- Coordinates: 47.1°N 22.15°E
- Country: Romania
- County: Bihor
- Population (2021-12-01): 4,759
- Time zone: UTC+02:00 (EET)
  - Summer (DST): UTC+03:00 (EEST)
- Vehicle reg.: BH

Ineu (Hungarian: Köröskisjenő) is a commune in Bihor County, Crișana, Romania with a population of 4,759 people (2021). It is composed of three villages: Botean (Mezőbottyán), Husasău de Criș (Köröskisújfalu) and Ineu.
