= Cristian Cigan =

Romanian footballer

Personal information
- Full name: Cristian Lucian Cigan
- Date of birth: 15 May 1987 (age 39)
- Place of birth: Oradea, Romania
- Height: 1.82 m (5 ft 11 1/2 in)
- Positions: Attacking midfielder; striker

Team information
- Current team: Oșorhei
- Number: 21

Senior career*
Years	Team	Apps	(Gls)
2003–2004	FC Oradea	4	(0)
2004–2005	Dinamo București	1	(0)
2004–2005	Dinamo II București	10	(0)
2005	Liberty Salonta	11	(2)
2005–2007	Sopron	55	(6)
2007–2008	Gallipoli	24	(3)
2008	Sambenedettese	12	(2)
2008–2009	Liberty Salonta	17	(3)
2009–2011	Gaz Metan Mediaș	16	(0)
2011	Bihor Oradea	10	(0)
2011–2013	Voința Sibiu	28	(0)
2013	Ebes KKSE	1	(0)
2014–2015	Bihor Oradea	27	(1)
2015–2017	Luceafărul Oradea	39	(16)
2017	SV Hollenburg	9	(4)
2017–2018	Crișul Chișineu-Criș	28	(38)
2018–2020	Szeged-Csanád	32	(6)
2020–2022	Füzesgyarmat	88	(29)
2023	CS Socodor	11	(9)
2023–2024	Diosig Bihardiószeg	24	(22)
2024–	Oșorhei	11	(7)

International career
2006–2007	Romania U-19	6	(1)
2006–2009	Romania U-21	10	(0)
- * Club domestic league appearances and goals as of 07:31, 22 June 2024 (UTC)

Cristian Lucian Cigan (born 15 May 1987) is a Romanian footballer who plays as a striker for CS Oșorhei. In his career, Cigan also played for teams such as: Bihor Oradea, Dinamo București, Liberty Salonta, FC Sopron, Luceafărul Oradea, Szeged-Csanád or Füzesgyarmat among others.

His father, Sorin Cigan was also a footballer.
