= Tudor Mândrușcă =

Romanian footballer (born 1989)

Personal information
- Date of birth: 4 February 1989 (age 37)
- Place of birth: Cluj-Napoca, Romania
- Height: 1.92 m (6 ft 3 1/2 in)
- Position: Forward

Youth career
- Școala de Fotbal "Zoltan Ivansuc"
- Vaslui

Senior career*
Years	Team	Apps	(Gls)
2012	Sănătatea Cluj	0	(0)
2012	→ Unirea Florești (loan)	0	(0)
2012	CFR Cluj	0	(0)
2012	Unirea Alba Iulia	11	(3)
2013	Fortuna Brazi	0	(0)
2013–2014	→ Național Sebiș (loan)	0	(0)
2014–2015	Ceahlăul Piatra Neamț	9	(0)
2015–2016	Unirea Jucu	0	(0)
- * Club domestic league appearances and goals as of 7 March 2017

Tudor Mândrușcă (born 4 February 1989) is a Romanian footballer who plays as a forward.

Dorinel Munteanu has placed Mândrușcă among the most promising young talents of his generation.
