= Răzvan Tincu =

Romanian footballer

Personal information
- Date of birth: 15 July 1987 (age 39)
- Place of birth: Satu Mare, Romania
- Height: 1.84 m (6 ft 0 in)
- Position: Centre-back

Youth career
- 2002–2003: Someşul Satu Mare
- 2003–2005: Florența Odoreu
- 2005: LPS Satu Mare
- 2006–2008: Rapid București

Senior career*
Years	Team	Apps	(Gls)
2006–2008	Rapid II București	13	(0)
2008–2015	Botoșani	148	(14)
2011–2013	→ CSMS Iași (loan)	57	(1)
2015–2016	Concordia Chiajna	47	(0)
2017–2018	Botoșani	41	(1)
2018–2019	Doxa Katokopias	29	(0)
2019–2022	Sepsi OSK	64	(1)
2022–2024	Politehnica Iași	27	(0)
2024–2025	Minaur Baia Mare	5	(0)
- * Club domestic league appearances and goals as of 29 January 2024

Răzvan Tincu (born 15 July 1987) is a Romanian footballer who plays as a centre-back.

== Career statistics ==
As of match played 16 December 2023

Appearances and goals by club, season and competition
Club	Season	League			National cup (Note: Includes Cupa României, Cypriot Cup)		League cup (Note: Includes Cupa Ligii)		Europe		Other		Total	
Club	Season	Division	Apps	Goals	Apps	Goals	Apps	Goals	Apps	Goals	Apps	Goals	Apps	Goals
Rapid II București	2005–06	Divizia B	13	0	—		—		—		—		13	0
Rapid II București	2006–07	Liga III	?	?	?	?	—		—		—		?	?
Rapid II București	2007–08	Liga III	?	?	?	?	—		—		—		?	?
Rapid II București	Total		13	0	0	0	0	0	0	0	0	0	13	0
Botoșani	2008–09	Liga II	28	3	?	?	—		—		—		28	3
Botoșani	2009–10	Liga II	31	6	?	?	—		—		—		31	6
Botoșani	2010–11	Liga II	29	4	?	?	—		—		—		29	4
Botoșani	2013–14	Liga I	29	1	1	0	—		—		—		30	1
Botoșani	2014–15	Liga I	31	0	0	0	1	0	—		—		32	0
Botoșani	Total		148	14	1	0	1	0	0	0	0	0	150	14
CSMS Iași (loan)	2011–12	Liga II	26	0	0	0	—		—		—		26	0
CSMS Iași (loan)	2012–13	Liga I	31	1	1	0	—		—		—		32	1
CSMS Iași (loan)	Total		57	1	1	0	0	0	0	0	0	0	58	1
Concordia Chiajna	2015–16	Liga I	32	0	2	0	4	0	—		—		38	0
Concordia Chiajna	2016–17	Liga I	15	0	0	0	1	0	—		—		16	0
Concordia Chiajna	Total		47	0	2	0	5	0	0	0	0	0	54	0
Botoșani	2016–17	Liga I	13	0	0	0	0	0	—		—		13	0
Botoșani	2017–18	Liga I	28	1	3	0	—		—		—		31	1
Botoșani	Total		41	1	3	0	0	0	0	0	0	0	44	1
Doxa Katokopias	2018–19	Cypriot First Division	29	0	2	0	—		—		—		31	0
Sepsi OSK	2019–20	Liga I	35	1	3	0	—		—		—		38	1
Sepsi OSK	2020–21	Liga I	13	0	0	0	—		—		—		13	0
Sepsi OSK	2021–22	Liga I	16	0	2	0	—		2 (Note: Appearances in UEFA Europa Conference League)	0	—		20	0
Sepsi OSK	Total		64	1	5	0	0	0	2	0	0	0	71	1
Politehnica Iași	2022–23	Liga II	21	0	0	0	—		—		—		21	0
Politehnica Iași	2023–24	Liga I	6	0	1	0	—		—		—		7	0
Politehnica Iași	Total		27	0	1	0	0	0	0	0	0	0	28	0
Minaur Baia Mare	2023–24	Liga III	0	0	—		—		—		—		0	0
Career total			426	17	15	0	6	0	2	0	0	0	449	17

== Honours ==
Politehnica Iași

- Liga II: 2011–12, 2022–23

Concordia Chiajna

- Cupa Ligii runner-up: 2015–16

Sepsi OSK

- Cupa României: 2021–22
