= Ionuț Voicu =

Romanian footballer

Personal information
- Full name: Ionuț Cosmin Voicu
- Date of birth: 2 August 1984 (age 42)
- Place of birth: Alexandria, Romania
- Height: 1.74 m (5 ft 9 in)
- Position: Right back

Team information
- Current team: Rapid București (delegate)

Youth career
- –2002: Rulmentul Alexandria

Senior career*
Years	Team	Apps	(Gls)
2002–2003	Argeș Pitești	1	(0)
2003–2004	Rarora Râmnicu Vâlcea	17	(1)
2004–2005	Rulmentul Alexandria	25	(1)
2005–2006	Inter Gaz București	24	(2)
2007–2011	FC Brașov	93	(3)
2011–2012	Mioveni	26	(0)
2012–2015	Rapid București	45	(0)
2014–2015	→ Studențesc Iași (loan)	28	(0)
2015–2017	Politehnica Iași	62	(0)
2017	Gaz Metan Mediaș	8	(0)
2017–2021	Rapid București	80	(0)
Total		409	(7)

Managerial career
- 2021–: Rapid București (delegate)
- * Club domestic league appearances and goals

Ionuț Cosmin Voicu (born 2 August 1984) is a Romanian former professional footballer who played as a right back.

== Honours ==
FC Brașov

- Liga II: 2007–08

Rapid București

- Liga III: 2018–19
- Liga IV – Bucharest: 2017–18
