= Adrian Olah =

Romanian footballer (born 1981)

Personal information
- Date of birth: 30 April 1981 (age 45)
- Place of birth: Târgu Mureș, Romania
- Height: 1.73 m (5 ft 8 in)
- Positions: Right back; defensive midfielder

Senior career*
Years	Team	Apps	(Gls)
1998–2005	Național București	108	(6)
2005–2007	Politehnica Timișoara	39	(1)
2007–2009	Universitatea Cluj	17	(1)
2009–2010	Unirea Alba Iulia	30	(1)
2010–2011	Săgeata Năvodari	28	(2)
2011–2013	Turnu Severin	48	(6)
2013–2015	Politehnica Iași	47	(9)
Total		317	(26)

Managerial career
- 2015–: Juvenes Târgu Mureș (youth)
- * Club domestic league appearances and goals as of 21 June 2016

Adrian Olah (born 30 April 1981 in Târgu Mureș) is a former Romanian footballer who played as a defender and as a midfielder. He is currently the manager of the youth squad Juvenes Târgu Mureș.

== Club career ==
Olah made his debut in the Divizia A during the 1998/1999 season at FC Național where he kept on playing until the summer of 2005, when he moved to FCU Politehnica Timișoara as part of the deal which had brought Gigel Coman, Gabriel Cânu, Marius Popa and Gabriel Caramarin to Timișoara earlier that year.
