= Alexandru Țigănașu =

Romanian professional footballer

Personal information
- Date of birth: 12 June 1990 (age 36)
- Place of birth: Săveni, Romania
- Height: 1.79 m (5 ft 10 in)
- Positions: Left-back; midfielder

Team information
- Current team: Botoșani
- Number: 30

Youth career
- –2007: Grup Școlar Agricol Nucet

Senior career*
Years	Team	Apps	(Gls)
2007–2009	Electrosid Titu		
2009–2010	Botoșani	24	(0)
2011–2014	Astra Giurgiu	25	(1)
2012–2014	→ CSMS Iași (loan)	48	(7)
2014–2017	Politehnica Iași	83	(2)
2017–2018	ACS Poli Timișoara	17	(0)
2018–2019	Petrolul Ploiești	29	(2)
2019–	Botoșani	198	(4)

International career
2011	Romania U21	5	(1)
- * Club domestic league appearances and goals as of 1 November 2026

Alexandru Țigănașu (born 12 June 1990) is a Romanian professional footballer who plays as a left-back or a midfielder for Liga I club Botoșani.

== Career statistics ==
As of 1 November 2026

Appearances and goals by club, season and competition
Club	Season	League			Cupa României		Europe		Other		Total	
Club	Season	Division	Apps	Goals	Apps	Goals	Apps	Goals	Apps	Goals	Apps	Goals
Electrosid Titu	2007–08	Liga III	?	?	?	?	—		—		?	?
Electrosid Titu	2008–09	Liga III	?	?	?	?	—		—		?	?
Electrosid Titu	Total		?	?	?	?	—		—		?	?
Botoșani	2009–10	Liga II	12	0	0	0	—		—		12	0
Botoșani	2010–11	Liga II	12	0	0	0	—		—		12	0
Botoșani	Total		24	0	0	0	—		—		24	0
Astra Giurgiu	2010–11	Liga I	7	0	—		—		—		7	0
Astra Giurgiu	2011–12	Liga I	18	1	1	0	—		—		19	1
Astra Giurgiu	2014–15	Liga I	0	0	—		0	0	0	0	0	0
Astra Giurgiu	Total		25	1	1	0	0	0	0	0	26	1
CSMS Iași (loan)	2012–13	Liga I	24	2	1	0	—		—		25	2
CSMS Iași (loan)	2013–14	Liga II	24	5	1	0	—		—		25	5
CSMS Iași (loan)	Total		48	7	2	0	—		—		50	7
Politehnica Iași	2014–15	Liga I	19	0	1	0	—		0	0	20	0
Politehnica Iași	2015–16	Liga I	28	1	2	0	—		0	0	30	1
Politehnica Iași	2016–17	Liga I	36	1	2	0	2 (Note: Appearances in UEFA Europa League)	0	1 (Note: Appearance in Cupa Ligii)	0	41	1
Politehnica Iași	Total		83	2	5	0	2	0	1	0	91	2
ACS Poli Timișoara	2017–18	Liga I	17	0	1	0	—		—		18	0
Petrolul Ploiești	2018–19	Liga II	29	2	0	0	—		—		29	2
Botoșani	2019–20	Liga I	30	2	0	0	—		—		30	2
Botoșani	2020–21	Liga I	33	0	0	0	2	0	—		35	0
Botoșani	2021–22	Liga I	33	0	1	0	—		1 (Note: Appearances in Liga I European play-offs)	0	35	0
Botoșani	2022–23	Liga I	32	1	2	0	—		—		34	1
Botoșani	2023–24	Liga I	30	0	3	0	—		2 (Note: Appearances in Liga I promotion/relegation play-offs)	0	35	0
Botoșani	2024–25	Liga I	16	0	2	0	—		—		18	0
Botoșani	2025–26	Liga I	22	1	1	0	—		1	0	24	1
Botoșani	2026–27	Liga I	2	0	0	0	—		—		2	0
Botoșani	Total		198	4	9	0	2	0	4	0	213	4
Career total			424	16	18	0	4	0	5	0	451	16

== Honours ==
CSMS Iași

- Liga II: 2013–14
