= Branko Grahovac =

Bosnian-Herzegovinian retired footballer (born 1983)

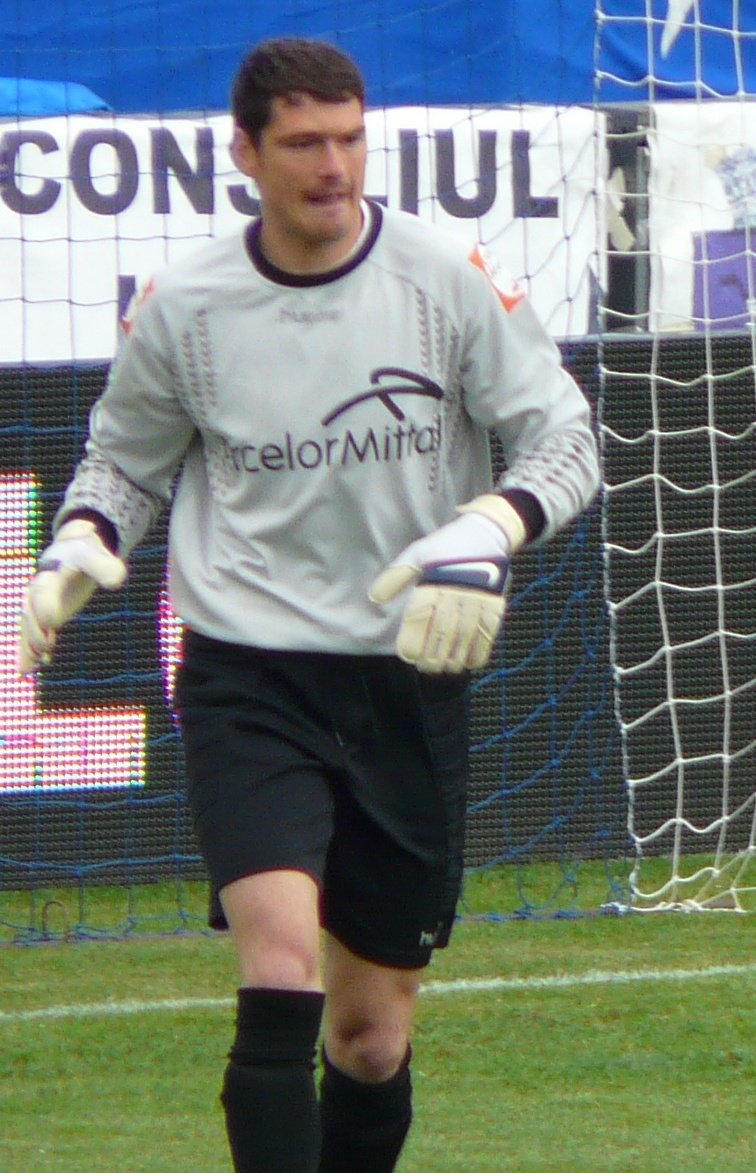
- Grahovac in 2010

Personal information
- Date of birth: 8 July 1983 (age 43)
- Place of birth: Bosanska Gradiška, SR Bosnia and Herzegovina, SFR Yugoslavia
- Height: 1.90 m (6 ft 3 in)
- Position: Goalkeeper

Youth career
- 1990–1999: Sloga Srbac
- 2001–2003: Zeta

Senior career*
Years	Team	Apps	(Gls)
2000–2001	Bratstvo Gračanica	20	(0)
2001–2005	Zeta	36	(0)
2005–2007	Željezničar	30	(0)
2007–2009	Borac Čačak	45	(1)
2010–2014	Oțelul Galați	93	(0)
2014	Kahramanmaraşspor	9	(0)
2014–2017	Politehnica Iași	88	(0)
2017	UTA Arad	13	(0)
Total		334	(1)
- * Club domestic league appearances and goals

Branko Grahovac (Serbian Cyrillic: Бранко Граховац; born 8 July 1983) is a Bosnian former professional footballer who played as a goalkeeper.

== Club career ==
He started playing in the youth squads of FK Zeta and started playing as a senior in a lower league FK Bratstvo. After only one season he was back to Zeta where he played in the First League of FR Yugoslavia until 2005. Then he moved to Premier League of Bosnia and Herzegovina FK Željezničar. After two seasons there, he signed with Serbian SuperLiga club Borac Čačak. In January 2010 he signed for Romanian club Oțelul Galați.

== Personal life ==
Grahovac is an ethnic Serb.

== Honours ==
Oțelul Galați

- Liga I: 2010–11
- Supercupa României: 2011

Individual

- Liga I Best goalkeeper: 2015–16 (shared with Alexandru Marc), 2016–17 (shared with Florin Niță)

== External sources ==
- Branko Grahovac at RomanianSoccer.ro (in Romanian)
- Branko Grahovac at Soccerway (archived)
- "Profile at otelul-galati.ro" (in Romanian). Archived from the original on 2010-11-17.
- Profile at Srbijafudbal
- Profile and stats until 2003 at Dekisa.Tripod
