= Iulian Vladu =

Romanian footballer

Personal information
- Full name: Iulian Adrian Vladu
- Date of birth: 2 February 1982 (age 44)
- Place of birth: Caracal, Romania
- Height: 1.80 m (5 ft 11 in)
- Positions: Left back; midfielder

Senior career*
Years	Team	Apps	(Gls)
2007–2011	CS Mioveni	39	(2)
2011–2014	CSMS Iași	68	(1)
2015	Șoimii Pâncota	1	(0)
2015–2016	SCM Pitești		
2019–2020	Muscelul Câmpulung		
- * Club domestic league appearances and goals as of 22 October 2019

Iulian Adrian Vladu (born 2 February 1982 in Caracal) is a Romanian footballer who plays as a defender.

== Notes ==
^1 The 2008–2009 and 2009–2010 Liga II appearances and goals made for CS Mioveni are unavailable.
