= Bogdan Burlă =

Romanian footballer

Personal information
- Full name: Bogdan Andrei Burlă
- Date of birth: 5 June 1996 (age 30)
- Place of birth: Arad, Romania
- Height: 1.84 m (6 ft 0 in)
- Position: Centre back

Team information
- Current team: Unirea Sântana
- Number: 69

Youth career
- –2011: Atletico Arad
- 2011–2012: Osasuna
- 2012–2013: Gheorghe Hagi Football Academy

Senior career*
Years	Team	Apps	(Gls)
2013–2018	UTA Arad	136	(16)
2018–2019	Șoimii Lipova	26	(1)
2019–2020	Gloria LT Cermei	14	(5)
2020–2021	Ineu	0	(0)
2021–2022	Frontiera Curtici	23	(9)
2022–2023	Crișul Chișineu-Criș	27	(3)
2023–	Unirea Sântana	0	(0)
- * Club domestic league appearances and goals as of 17:37, 17 January 2024 (UTC)

Bogdan Burlă (born 5 June 1996) is a Romanian footballer who plays as a centre back for Unirea Sântana. In his career Burlă played more than 130 matches for UTA Arad, team with which he achieved two promotions, to Liga III and to Liga II.
