= Narcis Bădic =

Romanian Footballer

Personal information
- Full name: Narcis Iulian Bădic
- Date of birth: 15 July 1991 (age 35)
- Place of birth: Iași, Romania
- Height: 1.80 m (5 ft 11 in)
- Positions: Left back; midfielder

Youth career
- –2010: Politehnica Iaşi

Senior career*
Years	Team	Apps	(Gls)
2010–2020	Politehnica Iași	107	(7)
- * Club domestic league appearances and goals as of 24 August 2020

Narcis Iulian Bădic (born 15 July 1991) is a Romanian professional footballer who plays as a left back or a midfielder.

== Club career ==
Bădic started his career with local team FC Politehnica Iași, and slowly made his way through the various youth teams, until the summer of 2010, when the club folded due to financial constraints.

=== Politehnica Iași ===
Later that summer, Bădic signed a contract with the successor of Poli, the newly founded Liga II club Politehnica Iași (2010). After two years in the Romanian second division, Bădic helped Politehnica to the 2011–12 Liga II title and subsequent promotion to Liga I. He made his first league debut on 29 April 2013, in a 1–2 defeat against FC Brașov.

After two dreadful seasons marred by various injuries, in which Bădic only managed a combined four league appearances, he finally made his first team comeback for the 2014–15 Liga I campaign.

For the 2017–18 season, manager Flavius Stoican moved Bădic from the midfield to the left back position. While playing in defence, he put in some of his best performances for Politehnica, helping them to a record sixth-place finish in the league. He was subsequently rewarded with a new two-year contract to keep him at the club until the summer of 2020.

== Career statistics ==
=== Club ===
As of 21 July 2021

Club statistics
Club	Season	League		Cup		Europe		Total	
Club	Season	Apps	Goals	Apps	Goals	Apps	Goals	Apps	Goals
Politehnica Iași
Politehnica Iași	2010–11	7	0	0	0	–		7	0
Politehnica Iași	2011–12	22	4	0	0	–		22	4
Politehnica Iași	2012–13	2	0	0	0	–		2	0
Politehnica Iași	2013–14	2	0	1	0	–		3	0
Politehnica Iași	2014–15	19	2	3	0	–		22	2
Politehnica Iași	2015–16	14	0	3	0	–		17	0
Politehnica Iași	2016–17	7	0	0	0	0	0	7	0
Politehnica Iași	2017–18	21	1	3	0	–		24	1
Politehnica Iași	2018–19	9	0	1	0	–		10	0
Politehnica Iași	2019–20	4	0	1	0	–		5	0
Politehnica Iași	Total	107	7	12	0	0	0	119	7
Career total		107	7	12	0	0	0	119	7

== Honours ==
=== Politehnica Iași ===
- Liga II: 2011–12, 2013–14
