= CS Oșorhei =

Romanian football club

- Full name: Clubul Sportiv Oșorhei
- Nicknames: Galben-Negrii (The Yellow and Blacks)
- Short name: CSO
- Founded: 2000; 26 years ago as Tricolorul Alparea
- Ground: Comunal
- Capacity: 500
- Owner: Oșorhei Commune
- Chairman: Cristian Indrei
- Manager: Răzvan Giura
- League: Liga IV
- 2025–26: Liga IV, Bihor County, 3rd of 14
| Home colours | Away colours |

Clubul Sportiv Oșorhei is a Romanian professional football club from Oșorhei, Bihor County, founded in 2000. The team currently plays in Liga IV – Bihor County.

== History ==
Founded in 2000 as Tricolorul Alparea, the club played for twelve years at amateur level, in Liga IV – Bihor County, until their promotion to Liga III in 2012. Led by Mircea Madar, Tricolorul won the county league and the promotion play-off match against Someșul Cărășeu, the Liga IV – Satu Mare County winner, 1–0 at the Municipal Stadium in Zalău.

After promotion, they changed their name from Tricolorul Alparea to CS Oșorhei. In the three seasons spent on the third level of the Romanian football they finished on honorable places: 3rd, 4th and 5th. The major objective of the club is to promote young players. In 2015 they have entered into a partnership with Liga II club Bihor Oradea.

== Chronology of names ==
| Name | Period |
|---|---|
| Tricolorul Alparea | 2000–2012 |
| CS Oșorhei | 2012–present |

== Stadium ==
The club plays its home matches on Stadionul Comunal from Alparea.

== Honours ==
Liga IV – Bihor County

- Winners (2): 2005–06, 2011–12

Liga V – Bihor County

- Winners (1): 2000–01

== Players ==
=== First team squad ===
As of 1 March 2025

Note: Flags indicate national team as defined under FIFA eligibility rules; some limited exceptions apply. Players may hold more than one non-FIFA nationality.

| No. | Pos. | Nation | Player |
|---|---|---|---|
| 1 | GK | ROU | Alex Dulău |
| 4 | DF | ROU | Răzvan Bondar |
| 6 | MF | ROU | Florin Podilă |
| 8 | MF | ROU | Andrei Ferik |
| 12 | GK | ROU | Bogdan Hojda |
| 14 | DF | ROU | Vlad Negruțiu |
| 17 | DF | ROU | Șerban Man (Vice-Captain) |
| 19 | MF | ROU | Claudiu Codoban |
| 20 | MF | ROU | Răzvan Giura |
| 21 | FW | ROU | Cristian Cigan |
| 22 | DF | ROU | Antonio Hadade |
| 23 | DF | ROU | Marcel Gal (Captain) |

| No. | Pos. | Nation | Player |
|---|---|---|---|
| 24 | DF | ROU | Vlad Duma |
| 77 | MF | ROU | Adrian Ungur |
| 80 | FW | ROU | Adrian Negruțiu |
| 97 | MF | ROU | Ionuț Kălăucz (on loan from CAO) |
| — | GK | ROU | Ionuț Matei |
| — | DF | ROU | Andrei Bene |
| — | DF | ROU | Eugen Gabor |
| — | DF | ROU | Bogdan Mintaș |
| — | MF | ROU | Carlos Covaciu |
| — | MF | ROU | Alexandru Pașc |
| — | MF | ROU | Vlad Sebeșan |
| — | FW | ROU | Teodor Cheregi |

=== Out on loan ===
Note: Flags indicate national team as defined under FIFA eligibility rules; some limited exceptions apply. Players may hold more than one non-FIFA nationality.

| No. / Pos. / Nation / Player; — / MF / ROU / Sergiu Ban (on loan to Ștei) | No. / Pos. / Nation / Player; — / FW / ROU / Mario Junc (on loan to Ștei) |

== Club Officials ==
=== Board of directors ===
| Role | Name |
|---|---|
| Owner | (Romania) Oșorhei Commune |
| President | (Romania) Cristian Indrei |
| Sporting director | (Romania) Ionuț Ile |
| Team manager | (Romania) Ionuț Mateiu |

=== Current technical staff ===
| Role | Name |
|---|---|
| Manager | (Romania) Răzvan Giura |
| Goalkeeping coach | (Romania) Sorin Danciu |
| Club doctor | (Romania) Samuel Negruț |

== Former managers ==
- (Romania) Sorin Cigan (2011)
- (Romania) Cosmin Bodea (2012–2013)
