= Bogdan Străuț =

Romanian footballer

Personal information
- Full name: Bogdan Adrian Străuț
- Date of birth: 28 April 1986 (age 40)
- Place of birth: Timișoara, Romania
- Height: 1.80 m (5 ft 11 in)
- Position: Right back

Youth career
- 2004–2005: FC Jimbolia

Senior career*
| Years | Team | Apps | (Gls) |
| 2005–2006 | CFR Timișoara | 12 | (1) |
| 2006–2007 | Politehnica Timișoara | 1 | (0) |
| 2006–2007 | Politehnica II Timișoara | 27 | (2) |
| 2007–2008 | → FCM Reșița (loan) | 13 | (0) |
| 2008–2009 | Liberty Salonta | 26 | (1) |
| 2009–2010 | Politehnica Iași | 18 | (0) |
| 2010–2011 | Chimia Brazi | 0 | (0) |
| 2010–2011 | → Victoria Brănești (loan) | 12 | (0) |
| 2011–2012 | Petrolul Ploiești | 24 | (0) |
| 2012–2015 | Brașov | 52 | (0) |
| 2015–2016 | Baia Mare | 29 | (1) |
| 2016–2018 | Poli Timișoara | 46 | (1) |
| 2018–2019 | Ripensia Timișoara | 28 | (0) |
| 2019– 2020 | Dumbrăvița | 0 | (0) |

International career^{‡}
| 2010 | Romania U-23 | 1 | (0) |
- * Club domestic league appearances and goals as of 25 June 2020 ‡ National team caps and goals as of 31 October 2010

Bogdan Adrian Străuț (born 28 April 1986 in Timișoara) is a Romanian defender.
