= CS Bihorul Beiuș =

Romanian football club

- Full name: Clubul Sportiv Bihorul Beiuș
- Nicknames: Beiușenii (The People from Beiuș)
- Short name: Bihorul Beiuș
- Founded: 7 July 1921; 104 years ago as Aurora Beiuș; 1 July 1996; 30 years ago as CF Bihorul Beiuș
- Ground: Francisc Matei
- Capacity: 2,000
- Owner: Beiuș Municipality
- Chairman: Silviu Odobasianu
- Manager: George Zima
- League: Liga III
- 2025–26: Liga III, Seria VIII, 8th
| Home colours | Away colours |

Clubul Sportiv Bihorul Beiuș, commonly known as Bihorul Beiuș, is a Romanian professional football club based in Beiuș, Bihor County, which currently competes in Liga III, the third tier of Romanian football.

== History ==
Clubul Sportiv Bihorul Beiuș was founded on 7 July 1921 as Aurora Beiuș by a group of young players led by professor Ioan Buşiţia. It was considered the most representative club of the Beiuș Depression and the city of Beiuș.

The team evolved for the most part of its existence in Liga IV – Bihor County, with the first appearance in national football in the 1978–79 season of Divizia C, finishing on 5th place in the 9th series. This first season was followed by another 4 seasons for the team in Divizia C: 1979–80, 1980–81, 1981–82 and 1982–83, but with weaker rankings. At the end of 1982–83 season, the team was relegated back to Liga IV.

Beiușenii returned in Divizia C in 1985 under the name of Gloria Beiuș and remained at this level until 1990, but with no notable performances. In the middle of the 1989–90 season the club was liquidated, but was restarted in 1996 as CF Bihorul Beiuș at the initiative of a group of 14 people, including the mayor of Beiuș from that period, Octavian Codreanu.

The club was promoted back to Diviza C in 2004 after fourteen years of absence, this time under the name of Bihorul Beiuș. The team has been a constant presence at this level and at the end of the 2008–09 Liga III the club showed off its best performance, coming in 5th place at its debut in Liga III. Then at the end of the 2011–12 Liga III season Bihorul Beiuș finished in 3rd place earning the best performance in the history of the club. Due to a lack of solid funding during that same summer the team chose to withdraw from Liga III.

After the withdrawal, the club was reorganized in Liga V – Bihor County, the fifth tier of the Romanian football league systemand the second at the county level, and the club started to put more emphasis on youth development. Winning Series III in the 2012–13 season, Bihorul returned to Liga IV – Bihor County, finishing 5th in 2013–14 and 6th in 2014–15. The U–21 team was also crowned national vice-champions at the amateur level.

In 2015, Rudolf Kovács was hired as the new head coach and led the team to 4th place in 2015–16 and runners-up in 2016–17, while the Under-21 squad was crowned Bihor County champion for the third consecutive year. Bihorul then finished 8th in 2017–18 under Alin Popa in the first half and Ciprian Carțis, Vlad Silaghi, and Nicolae Mihoc in the second half. The team finished 13th at the end of 2018–19 under Nicolae Mihoc in the first half and Alin Popa in the second, and was relegated after the relegation play-out against Foresta Tileagd.

Bihorul was promoted to Liga III at the end of the 2024–25 season, after winning Liga IV – Bihor County and the promotion play-off against Sticla Arieșul Turda, the Cluj County champions (3–0 at home in the first leg and 1–0 away in the second leg). The squad coached by Vlad Silaghi included Flavius Bodea, Nicolae Oreste, Sergiu Bactăr, Alexandru Jurcuț, Laviniu Dărăban, Sebastian Oșvat, Denis Laza, Răzvan Tirla, Cyrus Habakuk, Raul Ember, Adrian Micaș, Cătălin Dan, Paul Chiș Toie, Dacian Ușvat, Cristian Copil, Ricardo Bartha, Claudiu Bercea, Marius Balogh, Rareș Bochiș, Rareș Pop, Andrei Popa, Rareș Zdrâncă, and Vlad Degău.

== Stadium ==
The club plays its home matches on Francsic Matei Stadium from Beiuș.

== Rivalries ==
Bihorul Beiuș has had several rivalries over time, especially with teams from the Beiuș Depression. The main rivals were the two main teams from Ștei, a small industrial town, Minerul Ștei and Oțelul Ștei, both common presences in Liga III and Liga IV. After the fall of the mining and steel industry both teams were dissolved and a new team was formed, CSO Ștei, which is now the main rival of Bihorul Beiuș.

| Name | Period |
| Aurora Beiuș | 1921–1978 |
| Tricolorul Beiuș | 1978–1981 |
| Bihorul Beiuș | 1981–1983 |
| Gloria Beiuș | 1983–1989 |
| Bihorul Beiuș | 1996–present |

== Honours ==
=== Leagues ===
Liga IV – Bihor County

- Winners (4): 1974–75, 1977–78, 1984–85, 2024–25
- Runners-up (2): 2003–04, 2016–17

Liga V – Bihor County

- Winners (1): 2012–13

==== Cups ====
Cupa României – Bihor County

- Winners (1): 2023–24
- Runners-up (1): 2016–17

=== Other performances ===
- 18 seasons in Liga III
- Best finish in Liga III: 3rd (2011–12)

== Players ==
=== First-team squad ===
As of 18 January 2026

Note: Flags indicate national team as defined under FIFA eligibility rules; some limited exceptions apply. Players may hold more than one non-FIFA nationality.

| No. | Pos. | Nation | Player |
|---|---|---|---|
| 1 | GK | ROU | Flaviu Bodea |
| 3 | DF | ROU | Răzvan Tirla |
| 4 | DF | ROU | Sebastian Oșvat |
| 5 | DF | ROU | Sergiu Bactăr (vice-captain) |
| 7 | MF | ROU | Vlad Degău (captain) |
| 8 | MF | ROU | Alexandru Lezeu |
| 9 | FW | ROU | Claudiu Bercea (3rd captain) |
| 11 | MF | ROU | Alexandru Matiuță |
| 14 | DF | ROU | Luca Buciuman |
| 15 | MF | ROU | Mihai Isai |

| No. | Pos. | Nation | Player |
|---|---|---|---|
| 16 | MF | ROU | Andrei Prața |
| 18 | MF | ROU | Andrei Puie |
| 19 | MF | ROU | Dacian Ușvat |
| 22 | DF | ROU | Alexandru Jurcuț |
| 24 | MF | ROU | Adrian Ungur |
| 26 | MF | ROU | Robert Turcan |
| 31 | DF | ROU | Ionuț Rus |
| 77 | GK | ROU | Oreste Nicolae |
| 80 | FW | ROU | Ricardo Bartha |
| — | MF | ROU | Alexandru Sorian |

=== Out on loan ===
Note: Flags indicate national team as defined under FIFA eligibility rules; some limited exceptions apply. Players may hold more than one non-FIFA nationality.

| No. / Pos. / Nation / Player; — / DF / ROU / Denis Laza (to CSO Ștei) | No. / Pos. / Nation / Player |

== Club officials ==
=== Board of directors ===
| Role | Name |
|---|---|
| Owner | (Romania) Beiuș Municipality |
| Honorary President | (Romania) Ioan Bondor |
| President | (Romania) Silviu Odobasianu |
| Vice-president | (Romania) Ionel Goina |
| Sporting director | (Romania) Florin Zdrâncă |

=== Current technical staff ===
| Role | Name |
|---|---|
| Manager | (Romania) Adrian Anca |
| Head coach | (Romania) George Zima |
| Assistant coaches | (Romania) Vlad Silaghi (Romania) Laur Nemeș |
| Goalkeeping coach | (Romania) Silviu Odobasianu |
| Fitness coach | (Romania) Marinel Rusu |
| Kinetotherapist | (Romania) Alexandru Peic |

== League and Cup history ==
| Season | Tier | Division | Place | Notes | Cupa României |
|---|---|---|---|---|---|
| 2025–26 | 3 | Liga III (Seria VIII) | TBD | | |

| Season | Tier | Division | Place | Notes | Cupa României |
|---|---|---|---|---|---|
| 2024–25 | 4 | Liga IV (BH) | 1st (C) | Promoted | |
