= FC Politehnica Iași (2010) =

Association football club in Iași

Politehnica Iași
- Full name: Fotbal Club Politehnica Iași
- Nicknames: Alb-albaștrii (The White and Blues); Trupa din Copou (Copou Squad)
- Short name: Poli Iași
- Founded: 27 April 1945; 81 years ago as Sportul Studențesc Iași; 16 August 2010; 16 years ago (refounded) as Asociația Club Sportiv Municipal Politehnica Iași
- Dissolved: 14 July 2026; 3 months ago
- Ground: Emil Alexandrescu
- Capacity: 11,390
- 2025–26: Liga II, 12th of 22

Fotbal Club Politehnica Iași (Romanian pronunciation: [po.liˈteh.nika ˈjaʃʲ]), commonly known as Politehnica Iași or simply Poli Iași, was a Romanian professional football club based in the city of Iași, Iași County.

Named after the Gheorghe Asachi Technical University of Iași, the original team was founded in 1945 and played in blue and white at the Stadionul Emil Alexandrescu until its dissolution in 2010.

Later that year, a new entity was formed under the name ACSMU Politehnica Iași, following a merger between Tricolorul Breaza and Navobi Iași. The new club began directly in the Liga II and is regarded as the historical successor of the original team, buying at auction its colours, history, and records.

Between 2011 and 2016, it was known as CSM Studențesc Iași, before reverting to the name Politehnica Iași.

It debuted in the Liga I during the 2012–13 season and equalled its all-time best finish by placing sixth in the 2017–18 season.

Politehnica Iași currently plays in the Liga II, wearing white and blue kits, and hosts matches at the 11,390-capacity Stadionul Emil Alexandrescu, built in 1960.

== History ==
=== Foundation and first years (2010–2014) ===
The original Politehnica Iași was established in April 1945 and folded in 2010 because of unpaid debts. In August that year, Tricolorul Breaza merged with Navobi Iași and formed ACSMU Politehnica Iași. Playing in the Liga II, the club's objective was to return to the first tier of Romanian football.

Ionuț Popa was appointed manager of the newly founded club and Grigore Sichitiu was elected as executive president.

In the summer of 2011, the club was renamed Clubul Sportiv Municipal Studențesc Iași, or simply CSMS Iași. For the second half of the 2011–12 season ex-Romanian international Florin Prunea was brought in as president. On 2 June 2012, after the 4–2 victory against Farul Constanța. the team gained promotion to Liga I, after two years in the second tier of Romanian football.

On 29 August, Liviu Ciobotariu was appointed head coach. The Moldavian team finished the 2012–13 season in 17th place and were relegated to the second division. Even though there were hopes that they would be accepted for the 2013–14 Liga I season, eventually CS Concordia Chiajna secured the last place in the first league, due to the relegation of FC Rapid București for financial reasons.

For the 2013–14 Liga II season, coach Costel Enache was brought in to head a team that retained the services of its young talent, the likes of Alexandru Crețu, Adrian Avrămia and Andrei Hergheligiu.

=== Return to the top division (2014–present) ===
Former logo, used between 2016 and 2018

After Marius Lăcătuș replaced Enache as manager, Politehnica finished 1st in the 2013–14 Liga II and were promoted back to Liga I. For the 2014–15 season, the club played for their first time in the Cupa Ligii, defeating ASA Târgu Mureș and advancing to the last-16, where they eliminated former Romanian Cup and Liga I winner CFR Cluj.

The 2015–16 Liga I season was one of the best in the short history of Politehnica Iași and in the football history of Iași. After a great campaign, the team finished 7th and qualified for the 2016–17 UEFA Europa League under the command of Italian coach Nicolò Napoli, with a team that relied on experienced players like: Andrei Cristea, Bojan Golubović, Ionuț Voicu and Branko Grahovac. In the second round of the 2016–17 UEFA Europa League, Politehnica encountered Croatian team Hajduk Split and after a 2–2 draw at Iași, they were defeated at Split 1–2, prematurely leaving the competition.

On 22 July 2016, the club announced that it had changed its name, from CSM Studențesc Iași to CSM Politehnica Iași, a name more closely linked to the Iași football tradition and dissolved FC Politehnica Iași (1945).

In June 2017, president Florin Prunea was let go after five years at the helm of Politehnica Iași. Adrian Ambrosie was subsequently appointed to the position. After a number of major departures, with the likes of Lukács Bőle and Daisuke Sato finishing their contracts, the team went into major reconstruction and signed a number of foreign internationals, like Denis Rusu, Kamer Qaka, Luwagga Kizito and Platini. On 24 February 2018, despite a 0–1 loss to defending champions Viitorul Constanța, Poli Iași became the first team from Moldavia to qualify for the Liga I play-off round since its introduction in 2015. To the delight of manager Flavius Stoican, they went on to finish the league in 6th place, thus equalling the best result of predecessor FC Politehnica Iași.

Name	Period
Politehnica Iași	2010–2011
CSM Studențesc Iași	2011–2016
Politehnica Iași	2016–2026

== Stadium ==
Politehnica Iași plays its home matches at the Emil Alexandrescu stadium. It is located in the borough of Copou, near the Alexandru Ioan Cuza University, and has a capacity of 11,390 seats.

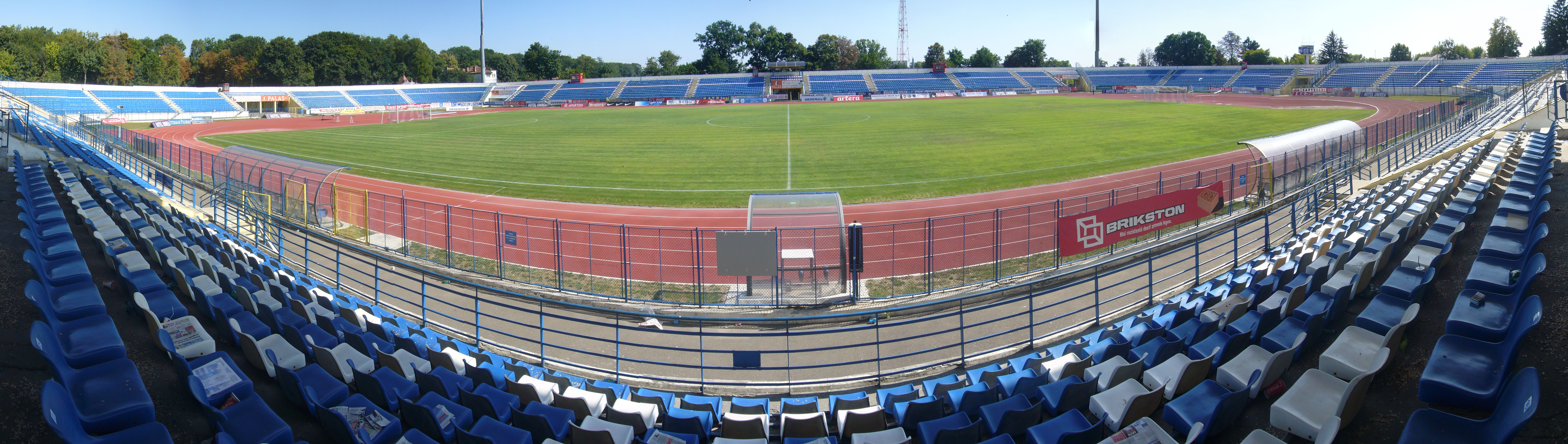
Emil Alexandrescu Stadium.

== Support ==
The biggest ultras groups of Politehnica Iași are Băieții Veseli and Ultras. Both supported FC Politehnica Iași (1945) until dissolution and regard the new team as its successor. They have friendly relationships with Zimbru Chișinău. Settore Ultra used to be another group of ultras but were captured by Oțelul Galați.

=== Rivalries ===
Politehnica Iași's main rival is Sporting Vaslui, and matches between these clubs are known as the "Moldovan Derby". The rivalry developed in the 2001–02 Liga III season, when the club from Vaslui was fighting for promotion to the second division together with Poli Iaşi, with the latter winning the championship and earning promotion. The rivalry between the two clubs was, again, fueled by another clash for promotion, this time in the 2003–04 Liga II season, with the whites and blues prevailing yet again. Another recent enemy is Oțelul Galați because of their friendly relations with Dacia Chișinău, as Peluza Nord Iași frequently chants obscenities towards them at nearly every game.

There is another smaller rivalry with FC Botoșani.

== Honours ==
=== Domestic ===
==== Leagues ====
- Divizia A / Liga I
  - Best finish: 6th in 1965–66, 2017–18
- Divizia B / Liga II
  - Winners (9): 1959–60, 1961–62, 1967–68, 1972–73, 1981–82, 2003–04, 2011–12, 2013–14, 2022–23
  - Runners-up (4): 1985–86, 1986–87, 1987–88, 1993–94
- Divizia C / Liga III
  - Winners (1): 2001–02

== Notable former players ==
The footballers enlisted below have had international cap(s) for their respective countries at junior and/or senior level. Players whose name is listed had a significant number of caps and goals accumulated throughout a certain number of seasons for the club itself as well.

Romania

- (Romania) Narcis Bădic
- (Romania) Mihai Bordeianu
- (Romania) Gabriel Bosoi
- (Romania) Ionuț Cioinac
- (Romania) Mădălin Ciucă
- (Romania) Alexandru Ciucur
- (Romania) Alexandru Crețu
- (Romania) Andrei Cristea
- (Romania) Francisc Cristea
- (Romania) Cosmin Frăsinescu
- (Romania) Florin Gardoș
- (Romania) Vasile Gheorghe
- (Romania) Andrei Gheorghiță
- (Romania) Ștefan Grigorie
- (Romania) Andrei Hergheligiu
- (Romania) Florin Ilie
- (Romania) Silviu Lung Jr.
- (Romania) Ovidiu Mihalache
- (Romania) Bogdan Mitrea
- (Romania) Adrian Olah
- (Romania) Răzvan Onea
- (Romania) Marius Onofraș
- (Romania) Ionuț Panțîru
- (Romania) Florin Plămadă
- (Romania) Alin Roman
- (Romania) Laurențiu Rus
- (Romania) Andrei Sin
- (Romania) Ștefan Ștefanovici
- (Romania) Cătălin Ștefănescu
- (Romania) Ștefan Târnovanu
- (Romania) Răzvan Tincu
- (Romania) Claudiu Tudor
- (Romania) Alexandru Țigănașu
- (Romania) Gabriel Vașvari
- (Romania) Iulian Vladu
- (Romania) Ionuț Voicu

Albania

- (Albania) Azdren Llullaku
- (Albania) Kamer Qaka

Argentina

- (Argentina) Manuel de Iriondo
- (Argentina) Julián Marchioni
- (Argentina) Juan Pablo Passaglia

Bosnia and Herzegovina

- (Bosnia and Herzegovina) Bojan Golubović
- (Bosnia and Herzegovina) Branko Grahovac

Brazil

- (Brazil) Luis Phelipe
- (Brazil) Jô Santos
- (Brazil) Wesley

Cameroon

- (Cameroon) Samuel Gouet

Cape Verde

- (Cape Verde) Platini

Central African Republic

- (Central African Republic) Habib Habibou

Côte d'Ivoire

- (Ivory Coast) Moussa Sanoh

Costa Rica

- (Costa Rica) Dylan Flores

Croatia

- (Croatia) Ivan Kelava

Democratic Republic of the Congo

- (Democratic Republic of the Congo) Cédric Mongongu

England

- (England) Shayon Harrison

France

- (France) Adama Diakhaby

Guatemala

- (Guatemala) Nicolás Samayoa

Hungary

- (Hungary) Lukács Bőle

Italy

- (Italy) Alessandro Caparco

Kosovo

- (Kosovo) Florian Loshaj

Lithuania

- (Lithuania) Linas Klimavičius

Montenegro

- (Montenegro) Uroš Đuranović

Moldova

- (Moldova) Alexei Koșelev
- (Moldova) Denis Rusu

Netherlands

- (Netherlands) Kevin Luckassen

Nigeria

- (Nigeria) Michael Omoh

North Macedonia

- (North Macedonia) Risto Jankov
- (North Macedonia) Todor Todoroski

Philippines

- (Philippines) Daisuke Sato

Portugal

- (Portugal) Filipe Nascimento
- (Portugal) Nuno Viveiros

Serbia

- (Serbia) Milan Mitić

Spain

- (Spain) Jesús Fernández
- (Spain) Adrià Gallego
- (Spain) Rubén Miño

Suriname

- (Suriname) Nicandro Breeveld

Uganda

- (Uganda) Luwagga Kizito

== Notable former managers ==
- (Romania) Sorin Cârțu
- (Romania) Liviu Ciobotariu
- (Romania) Costel Enache
- (Romania) Leo Grozavu
- (Romania) Marius Lăcătuș
- (Italy) Nicolò Napoli
- (Romania) Eugen Neagoe
- (Romania) Ionuț Popa
- (Romania) Mircea Rednic
- (Romania) Emil Săndoi
- (Romania) Flavius Stoican

== Statistics and records ==
=== League history ===
Season	League	Level	Pos.	Notes	Cupa României
2025–26	Liga II	2	11th (R)	Withdrew	Play-off round
2024–25	Liga I	1	13th (R)	Relegated	Group Stage
2023–24	Liga I	1	12th		Play-off round
2022–23	Liga II	2	1st (C, P)	Promoted	Play-off Round
2021–22	Liga II	2	12th		Round of 32
2020–21	Liga I	1	16th(R)	Relegated	Round of 16
2019–20	Liga I	1	12th		Semi-finals
2018–19	Liga I	1	10th		Round of 16
2017–18	Liga I	1	6th		Quarter-finals
2016–17	Liga I	1	7th		Round of 16
2015–16	Liga I	1	7th		Quarter-finals
2014–15	Liga I	1	10th		Round of 16
2013–14	Liga II	2	1st (C, P)	Promoted	Fifth Round
2012–13	Liga I	1	17th(R)	Relegated	Round of 32
2011–12	Liga II	2	1st (C, P)	Promoted	Fourth Round
2010–11	Liga II	2	6th		Fourth Round

=== European Cups history ===
Season	Competition	Round	Opponent	Home	Away	Aggregate
2016–17	UEFA Europa League	2Q	(Croatia) Hajduk Split	2–2	1–2	3–4

Notes

- 1Q: First qualifying round
- 2Q: Second qualifying round
- 3Q: Third qualifying round
- PO: Play-off round

=== European cups all-time statistics ===
As of 1 December 2017

Competition	S	P	W	D	L	GF	GA	GD
UEFA Europa League	1	2	0	1	1	3	4	−1
Total	1	2	0	1	1	3	4	−1
