= List of Romanian football transfers winter 2016–17 =

This is a list of Romanian football transfers for the 2016–17 winter transfer window. Only moves featuring 2016–17 Liga I and 2016–17 Liga II are listed.

== Liga I ==
=== Astra Giurgiu ===
In:

No.	Pos.	Nation	Player
—	MF	ROU	Mihai Butean (Loan return from Academica Clinceni)
—	GK	BUL	Plamen Iliev (From Botoșani)
—	DF	ROU	Claudiu Belu-Iordache (From Târgu Mureș)
—	MF	ROU	Andrei Pițian (From Pandurii Târgu Jiu)
—	FW	ROU	Sergiu Buș (From (England) Sheffield Wednesday)
—	FW	ROU	Constantin Budescu (From (China) Dalian Yifang, previously on loan)

Out:

No.	Pos.	Nation	Player
—	DF	ROU	Radu Crișan (On loan to Hermannstadt)
—	MF	ROU	Robert Boboc (On loan to Mioveni)
—	GK	ROU	George Gavrilaș (To Voluntari)
—	DF	NED	Vlatko Lazić (To (Netherlands) RKC Waalwijk)
—	FW	ROU	Denis Alibec (To Steaua București)
—	MF	NED	Romario Kortzorg (To Free agent)

=== Botoșani ===
In:

No.	Pos.	Nation	Player
—	GK	ROU	Alberto Cobrea (From Dinamo București)
—	DF	ROU	Răzvan Tincu (From Concordia Chiajna)
—	DF	ROU	Bogdan Ungurușan (From Pandurii Târgu Jiu)
—	MF	ROU	Laurențiu Buș (From (Israel) Hapoel Nir Ramat HaSharon)
—	MF	ROU	Alin Cârstocea (From Poli Timișoara)
—	MF	BRA	Endrick (From (Cyprus) Apollon Limassol, previously on loan at (Cyprus) AEZ Zakakiou)
—	FW	NGR	Benjamin Kuku (From Târgu Mureș)

Out:

No.	Pos.	Nation	Player
—	DF	ROU	Andrei Chindriș (On loan to Academica Clinceni)
—	MF	ROU	Răzvan Greu (On loan to Sepsi OSK Sfântu Gheorghe)
—	MF	ROU	Bogdan Varodi (On loan to Sănătatea Cluj, previously on loan to Metalurgistul Cugir)
—	GK	BUL	Plamen Iliev (To Astra Giurgiu)
—	DF	BUL	Radoslav Dimitrov (To CS U Craiova)
—	DF	ROU	Alexandru Ichim (To Brașov)
—	MF	ROU	Victoraș Astafei (To (Malaysia) Selangor)
—	FW	ROU	István Fülöp (To (Hungary) Diósgyőr)
—	FW	LTU	Deivydas Matulevičius (To (Belgium) Royal Excel Mouscron)
—	FW	BRA	Willie (To (Greece) Apollon Smyrnis)

=== CFR Cluj ===
In:

No.	Pos.	Nation	Player
—	MF	ROU	Liviu Antal (From (Israel) Hapoel Tel Aviv, previously on loan at Pandurii Târgu Jiu)
—	MF	ROU	Ciprian Deac (From (Kazakhstan) Tobol)
—	FW	CRO	Dino Špehar (From (Croatia) RNK Split)

Out:

No.	Pos.	Nation	Player
—	GK	ROU	Horațiu Moldovan (On loan to Hermannstadt)
—	MF	ROU	Rareș Pintea (On loan to Unirea Jucu)
—	MF	ROU	Szilard Vereș (On loan to (Hungary) Gyirmót)
—	GK	ROU	Răzvan Began (To Luceafărul Oradea)
—	DF	ROU	Cornel Ene (To Pandurii Târgu Jiu)
—	FW	ROU	László Hodgyai (To (Hungary) Csákvári)
—	FW	ROU	Sergiu Negruț (To Pandurii Târgu Jiu)

=== Concordia Chiajna ===
In:

No.	Pos.	Nation	Player
—	DF	ROU	Nicușor Fota (Loan return from Academica Clinceni)
—	MF	ROU	Florin Răsdan (Loan return from Brașov)
—	DF	ROU	Florin Bejan (On loan from (Poland) Cracovia)
—	DF	ROU	Dan Popescu (On loan from Steaua București)
—	DF	ROU	Alin Dobrosavlevici (From Târgu Mureș)
—	MF	ROU	Ovidiu Herea (From Pandurii Târgu Jiu)
—	MF	ROU	Valentin Munteanu (From Pandurii Târgu Jiu)
—	FW	ROU	Valentin Alexandru (From Pandurii Târgu Jiu)

Out:

No.	Pos.	Nation	Player
—	DF	ROU	Lucian Asanache (On loan to Foresta Suceava)
—	DF	ROU	Bogdan Bucurică (To CS U Craiova)
—	DF	ROU	Răzvan Tincu (To Botoșani)
—	MF	ROU	Neluț Roșu (To Viitorul Constanța)
—	FW	BRA	Alessandro Celin (To (Malaysia) Kelantan)
—	DF	ROU	Iulian Mamele (To Free agent)
—	MF	ROU	Adrian Cristea (To Free agent)

=== CSM Politehnica Iași ===
In:

No.	Pos.	Nation	Player
—	DF	ROU	Lucian Odăgieru (Loan return from Știința Miroslava)
—	FW	ROU	Lorenzo Ungurenașu (Loan return from CSM Pașcani)
—	DF	ROU	Ionuț Panțîru (From Știința Miroslava)
—	MF	ROU	Alexandru Răuță (From Pandurii Târgu Jiu)
—	MF	CPV	Sténio (From (Bulgaria) Botev Plovdiv)
—	FW	BIH	Bojan Golubović (From Steaua București)

Out:

No.	Pos.	Nation	Player
—	MF	ROU	Marius Chelaru (On loan to Știința Miroslava)
—	FW	ROU	Mădălin Crengăniș (On loan to Știința Miroslava)
—	DF	CRO	Ante Sarić (To (Bosnia and Herzegovina) Metalleghe-BSI)
—	MF	ROU	Alexandru Crețu (To (Slovenia) Olimpija Ljubljana)
—	FW	ITA	Gianmarco Piccioni (To UTA Arad)
—	GK	ROU	Dumitru Hotoboc (To Free agent)
—	MF	ROU	Mădălin Martin (To Free agent)

=== CS U Craiova ===
In:

No.	Pos.	Nation	Player
—	MF	ROU	Stephan Drăghici (Loan return from Râmnicu Vâlcea)
—	GK	POR	Pedro Mingote (From Târgu Mureș)
—	DF	FRA	Alexandre Barthe (From Free agent)
—	DF	BUL	Radoslav Dimitrov (From Botoșani)
—	DF	ROU	Bogdan Bucurică (From Concordia Chiajna)
—	MF	ROU	Mario Pistrițu (On loan to Râmnicu Vâlcea)
—	MF	ROU	Valentin Târș (On loan to Râmnicu Vâlcea)
—	FW	BIH	Nusmir Fajić (From (China) Xinjiang Tianshan Leopard)
—	FW	ROU	Antonio Spîrleanu (On loan to Râmnicu Vâlcea)

Out:

No.	Pos.	Nation	Player
—	GK	ROU	Laurențiu Popescu (On loan to Pandurii Târgu Jiu)
—	DF	ROU	Bogdan Vătăjelu (To (Czech Republic) Sparta Prague)
—	MF	ROU	Olivian Surugiu (To Pandurii Târgu Jiu)
—	FW	CPV	Rambé (To (Angola) 1º de Agosto)

=== Dinamo București ===
In:

No.	Pos.	Nation	Player
—	GK	ROU	Iustin Popescu (Loan return from Unirea Tărlungeni)
—	DF	ROU	Mihai Zamfir (Loan return from Unirea Tărlungeni)
—	MF	ROU	Paul Radu (Loan return from Dunărea Călărași)
—	DF	FRA	Claude Dielna (On loan from (England) Sheffield Wednesday)
—	DF	ITA	Luca Ceccarelli (From Free agent)
—	MF	ROU	Claudiu Bumba (From (Israel) Hapoel Tel Aviv)
—	FW	JOR	Tha'er Bawab (From (Qatar) Umm Salal)
—	FW	BRA	Rivaldinho (From (Brazil) Internacional, previously on loan at (Brazil) Paysandu)

Out:

No.	Pos.	Nation	Player
—	GK	ROU	Vlad Muțiu (On loan to Afumați, previously on loan at Râmnicu Vâlcea)
—	DF	ROU	Vlad Olteanu (On loan to Sepsi OSK Sfântu Gheorghe)
—	DF	ROU	Claudiu Săftescu (On loan to Chindia Târgoviște, previously on loan at Brașov)
—	MF	ROU	Valentin Lazăr (On loan to (Qatar) Al-Sailiya)
—	MF	ROU	Laurențiu Manole (On loan to Sepsi OSK Sfântu Gheorghe, previously on loan at Brașov)
—	FW	ROU	Robert Moldoveanu (On loan to Brașov)
—	GK	ROU	Alberto Cobrea (To Botoșani)
—	DF	AUT	Bernhard Janeczek (To (Austria) Rheindorf Altach)
—	FW	FRA	Harlem Gnohéré (To Steaua București)
—	FW	ROU	Dorin Rotariu (To (Belgium) Club Brugge)

=== Gaz Metan Mediaș ===
In:

No.	Pos.	Nation	Player
—	DF	GEO	Akaki Khubutia (From (Georgia (country)) Dinamo Tbilisi)
—	DF	FRA	Bernard Onanga Itoua (From Free agent)
—	MF	ALG	Aymen Tahar (From (Japan) Sagan Tosu)
—	FW	AUT	Daniel Sikorski (From (Russia) Khimki)

Out:

No.	Pos.	Nation	Player
—	DF	SRB	Aleksandar Šušnjar (To (Czech Republic) Teplice)
—	MF	ROU	Alin Predescu (To Luceafărul Oradea)
—	MF	ROU	Alexandru Zaharia (To Juventus București)
—	FW	ROU	Mircea Axente (To (Saudi Arabia) Al-Faisaly)
—	FW	ALB	Azdren Llullaku (To (Kazakhstan) Astana)

=== Pandurii Târgu Jiu ===
In:

No.	Pos.	Nation	Player
—	GK	ROU	Daniel Popescu (Loan return from Metalurgistul Cugir)
—	DF	ROU	Răzvan Negrescu (Loan return from Metalurgistul Cugir)
—	MF	ROU	Bogdan Dănăricu (Loan return from ASU Politehnica)
—	FW	ROU	Daniel Mărgărit (Loan return from ASU Politehnica)
—	GK	ROU	Laurențiu Popescu (On loan from CS U Craiova)
—	DF	ROU	Sorin Bușu (On loan from Râmnicu Vâlcea)
—	DF	NGR	Samson Nwabueze (On loan from Râmnicu Vâlcea)
—	DF	ROU	Cornel Ene (From CFR Cluj)
—	DF	BRA	Erico (From Free agent)
—	DF	ROU	Florin Ilie (From Luceafărul Oradea)
—	DF	NED	Jeffrey Ket (From (Slovakia) AS Trenčín)
—	DF	ROU	Ionuț Tătaru (From Hermannstadt)
—	MF	BRA	Élton (From Free agent)
—	MF	ROU	Dragoș Firțulescu (From Free agent)
—	MF	ROU	Yasin Hamed (From Târgu Mureș)
—	MF	ROU	Cosmin Mihai (From Unirea Tărlungeni)
—	MF	ROU	Ciprian Negoiță (From SCM Pitești)
—	MF	ROU	Paul Păcurar (From Luceafărul Oradea)
—	MF	ROU	Daniel Stana (From Râmnicu Vâlcea)
—	MF	ROU	Olivian Surugiu (From CSU Craiova)
—	MF	ROU	Ionuț Zaina (From Unirea Tărlungeni)
—	FW	ROU	Paul Batin (From (Poland) Miedź Legnica)
—	FW	ROU	Sergiu Negruț (From CFR Cluj)

Out:

No.	Pos.	Nation	Player
—	MF	ROU	Liviu Antal (Loan return to (Israel) Hapoel Tel Aviv, later signed by CFR Cluj)
—	DF	ROU	George Bârsănel (On loan to Național Sebiș)
—	FW	ROU	Daniel Cocină (On loan to Național Sebiș)
—	GK	ROU	Alexandru Oprița (To Sporting Roşiori)
—	DF	NED	Jordy Buijs (To (Australia) Sydney FC)
—	DF	BIH	Gordan Bunoza (To (South Korea) Incheon United)
—	DF	ROU	Marian Pleașcă (To Steaua București)
—	DF	ROU	Bogdan Șandru (To Dunărea Călărași)
—	DF	ROU	Bogdan Ungurușan (To Botoșani)
—	DF	SRB	Nikola Vasiljević (To (Japan) Tokushima Vortis)
—	MF	ROU	Alexandru Dan (To Metalul Reșița)
—	MF	ROU	Ovidiu Herea (To Concordia Chiajna)
—	MF	ROU	Valentin Munteanu (To Concordia Chiajna)
—	MF	NGR	Christian Obodo (To (Greece) Apollon Smyrnis)
—	MF	ROU	George Pirtea (To Național Sebiș)
—	MF	ROU	Andrei Pițian (To Astra Giurgiu)
—	MF	ROU	Alexandru Răuță (To CSM Politehnica Iași)
—	MF	ROU	Lucian Sănmărtean (To (Saudi Arabia) Al-Taawoun)
—	FW	ROU	Valentin Alexandru (To Concordia Chiajna)
—	GK	ROU	David Lazar (To Free agent)
—	DF	ROU	Constantin Grecu (To Free agent)
—	MF	CRO	Filip Mrzljak (To Free agent)
—	MF	ROU	Claudiu Voiculeț (To Free agent)
—	FW	ROU	George Țucudean (To Free agent)

=== Poli Timișoara ===
In:

No.	Pos.	Nation	Player
—	DF	ROU	Ionuț Murariu (From LPS Banatul Timișoara)
—	MF	CRO	Josip Šoljić (From (Croatia) Inter Zaprešić)
—	FW	CRO	Josip Fuček (From (Iceland) Vikingur Reykjavik)

Out:

No.	Pos.	Nation	Player
—	DF	ROU	Miodrag Todorov (On loan to Millenium Giarmata, previously on loan to Becicherecu Mic)
—	MF	ROU	Denis Ciobanu (To ACS Ghiroda, previously on loan to Becicherecu Mic)
—	MF	ROU	Alin Cârstocea (To Botoșani)
—	MF	ESP	Fernando Llorente (To (Spain) Cartagena)
—	MF	ROU	Iulian Roșu (To Olimpia Satu Mare)
—	FW	ALB	Fabian Lokaj (To (Switzerland) Chiasso)
—	FW	ROU	Cătălin Vraciu (To Foresta Suceava)
—	MF	ROU	Daniel Vădrariu (To Free agent)

=== Steaua București ===
In:

No.	Pos.	Nation	Player
—	DF	ROU	Mihai Bălașa (From (Italy) Roma, previously on loan at (Italy) Trapani)
—	DF	ROU	Marian Pleașcă (From Pandurii Târgu Jiu)
—	FW	ROU	Denis Alibec (From Astra Giurgiu)
—	FW	FRA	Harlem Gnohéré (From Dinamo București)

Out:

No.	Pos.	Nation	Player
—	DF	ROU	Bogdan Mitrea (Loan return to (Italy) Ascoli, later signed by (Cyprus) AEL Limassol)
—	GK	ROU	Valentin Cojocaru (On loan to (Italy) Frosinone, previously on loan at (Italy) Crotone)
—	DF	ROU	Dan Popescu (On loan to Concordia Chiajna)
—	MF	ROU	Sebastian Chitoșcă (On loan to Brașov)
—	MF	ROU	Rareș Enceanu (On loan to Brașov)
—	FW	ROU	Cristian Onțel (On loan to Academica Clinceni)
—	FW	ROU	Robert Vâlceanu (On loan to UTA Arad)
—	DF	ROU	Alin Toșca (To (Spain) Real Betis)
—	MF	CRO	Adnan Aganović (To (Greece) Larissa)
—	MF	ROU	Alexandru Bourceanu (To (Russia) Arsenal Tula)
—	MF	ROU	Adrian Popa (To (England) Reading)
—	FW	BIH	Bojan Golubović (To CSM Politehnica Iași)

=== Târgu Mureș ===
In:

No.	Pos.	Nation	Player
—	MF	ROU	Vasile Petra (Loan return from Brașov)
—	GK	ROU	Mirel Bolboașă (From Free agent)
—	GK	ROU	Eduard Pap (From Luceafărul Oradea)
—	DF	ROU	Răzvan Dulap (From Free agent)
—	DF	GRE	Konstantinos Rougalas (From Free agent)
—	DF	ESP	Javier Velayos (From (Spain) Racing Ferrol)
—	MF	ROU	Cristian Balgiu (From Afumați)
—	MF	ROU	Viorel Ferfelea (From Free agent)
—	MF	ROU	Bănel Nicoliță (From Făurei)
—	FW	ROU	Marius Bâtfoi (From Balotești)
—	FW	ROU	Andrei Sin (From Unirea Tărlungeni)

Out:

No.	Pos.	Nation	Player
—	FW	ROU	Sergiu Păcurar (On loan to CS Iernut)
—	GK	POR	Pedro Mingote (To CS U Craiova)
—	DF	ROU	Claudiu Belu-Iordache (To Astra Giurgiu)
—	DF	ROU	Andrei Cordoș (To (Maldives) Maziya)
—	DF	ROU	Alin Dobrosavlevici (To Concordia Chiajna)
—	DF	ROU	Gabriel Matei (To (Poland) Górnik Łęczna)
—	DF	ROU	Darius Ursu (To Luceafărul Oradea)
—	MF	ROU	Yasin Hamed (To Pandurii Târgu Jiu)
—	MF	ISR	Yuval Jakobovich (To (Israel) Hapoel Kfar Saba)
—	MF	ISR	Alon Netzer (To (Republic of Ireland) Derry City)
—	FW	NGR	Benjamin Kuku (To Botoșani)
—	FW	ROU	Vlad Morar (To Viitorul Constanța)
—	FW	ROU	Octavian Ursu (To Olimpia Satu Mare)
—	GK	ROU	Adrian Viciu (To Free agent)
—	FW	ROU	Adrian Borza (To Free agent)
—	FW	ROU	Norbert Feketics (To Avântul Reghin)
—	FW	ROU	Alexandru Ioniță (To Free agent)
—	FW	ROU	Romeo Surdu (To Free agent)
—	FW	ROU	Ianis Zicu (To Free agent)

=== Viitorul Constanța ===
In:

No.	Pos.	Nation	Player
—	DF	ROU	Cătălin Toriște (Loan return from Metalurgistul Cugir)
—	DF	ROU	Sebastian Mladen (From Free agent)
—	MF	ROU	Neluț Roșu (From Concordia Chiajna)
—	FW	ROU	Vlad Morar (From Târgu Mureș)

Out:

No.	Pos.	Nation	Player
—	GK	ROU	Cătălin Căbuz (On loan to Chindia Târgoviște, previously on loan at Râmnicu Vâlcea)
—	MF	ROU	Antonio Cruceru (On loan to Academica Clinceni)
—	FW	ROU	Florin Cioablă (On loan to Academica Clinceni)
—	DF	ROU	Cătălin Alexe (To Mioveni)
—	DF	MDA	Cătălin Carp (To (Russia) Ufa)
—	DF	ROU	Bruno Vasiu (To UTA Arad)
—	MF	ROU	Răzvan Marin (To (Belgium) Standard Liège)
—	MF	ARG	Pablo Brandán (To Free agent)

=== Voluntari ===
In:

No.	Pos.	Nation	Player
—	MF	ROU	Vasile Mihai (Loan return from Unirea Tărlungeni)
—	GK	ROU	George Gavrilaș (From Astra Giurgiu)
—	DF	ROU	Alin Iordache (From CS Balotești)
—	MF	ROU	Andrei Ionescu (From (Cyprus) ASIL Lysi)
—	FW	ROU	Costin Curelea (From Free agent)

Out:

No.	Pos.	Nation	Player
—	FW	ROU	Adrian Voicu (On loan to Olimpia Satu Mare)
—	DF	ROU	Cosmin Cristil (To Brașov)
—	MF	ROU	Andrei Lungu (To (Israel) Hapoel Nir Ramat HaSharon)

== Liga II ==
=== Academica Clinceni ===
In:

No.	Pos.	Nation	Player
—	DF	ROU	Andrei Chindriș (On loan from Botoșani)
—	MF	ROU	Antonio Cruceru (On loan from Viitorul Constanța)
—	FW	ROU	Florin Cioablă (On loan from Viitorul Constanța)
—	FW	ROU	Cristian Onțel (On loan from Steaua București)
—	DF	ROU	Cristian Pulhac (From (Cyprus) Aris Limassol)
—	DF	ROU	Bogdan Matei (From Alexandria)
—	MF	ROU	Daniel Benzar (From Free agent)
—	MF	ROU	Hristu Chiacu (From Tunari)
—	MF	ROU	Alexandru Lazăr (From (Italy) Messina)
—	MF	ROU	Bogdan Stancu (From Mioveni)

Out:

No.	Pos.	Nation	Player
—	DF	ROU	Radu Crișan (Loan return to Astra Giurgiu)
—	DF	ROU	Nicușor Fota (Loan return to Concordia Chiajna)
—	MF	ROU	Mihai Butean (Loan return to Astra Giurgiu)
—	MF	ROU	Marius Cocîrlă (Loan return to Concordia Chiajna)
—	DF	ROU	Florin Ștefan (To Juventus București)
—	MF	ROU	Alexandru Chebac (To Delta Dobrogea Tulcea)
—	MF	ROU	Alin Gojnea (To Balotești)
—	MF	ROU	Cornel Predescu (To (Albania) Skënderbeu Korçë)
—	FW	ROU	Andrei Antohi (To (Oman) Sohar)
—	FW	ROU	Valentin Lemnaru (To ASA Târgu Mureș)

=== Afumați ===
In:

No.	Pos.	Nation	Player
—	GK	ROU	Vlad Muțiu (On loan from Dinamo București, previously on loan to Râmnicu Vâlcea)
—	DF	ROU	Florin Nițescu (From Înainte Modelu)
—	MF	ROU	Răzvan Avram (From Foresta Suceava)
—	MF	ROU	Mugurel Dedu (From Free agent)
—	FW	ROU	Dorin Burlacu (From Free agent)

Out:

No.	Pos.	Nation	Player
—	DF	ROU	Robert Moglan (To Dacia Unirea Brăila)
—	MF	ROU	Cristian Balgiu (To Târgu Mureș)
—	MF	ROU	Răzvan Pivniceru (To Retired)
—	GK	ROU	Paul Botaș (To Free agent)

=== ASU Politehnica Timișoara ===
In:

No.	Pos.	Nation	Player
—	GK	ROU	Ricardo Filip (From CS Podari)
—	GK	ROU	Victor Gârlea (From Dacia Unirea Brăila)
—	DF	ROU	Vlad Bâte (From LPS Banatul Timișoara)
—	DF	ROU	Ioan Mera (From (Kazakhstan) Taraz)
—	MF	ROU	Răzvan Gorovei (From Știința Miroslava)
—	MF	ROU	Bogdan Nicolescu (From (Spain) CD Acero)
—	MF	ROU	Adrian Ungureanu (On loan from Ripensia Timișoara)

Out:

No.	Pos.	Nation	Player
—	GK	ROU	Alexandru Mitrea (Loan return to CS Ineu, lately on loan to CS Dorobanți)
—	DF	ROU	Miodrag Todorov (Loan return to ACS Poli Timișoara, later on loan to Millenium Giarmata)
—	MF	ROU	Denis Băban (Loan return to Marcel Băban Jimbolia, later on loan to Nuova Mama Mia Becicherecu Mic)
—	MF	ROU	Dan Constantinescu (Loan return to (Germany) TSV Berg)
—	MF	ROU	Bogdan Dănăricu (Loan return to Pandurii Târgu Jiu)
—	FW	ROU	Daniel Mărgărit (Loan return to Pandurii Târgu Jiu)
—	MF	ROU	Patrick Niță (Loan return to Marcel Băban Jimbolia, later on loan to Nuova Mama Mia Becicherecu Mic)
—	MF	ROU	Patrick Peter (Loan return to LPS Banatul Timișoara)
—	GK	ROU	Alin Constantinescu (To (Germany) TSV Berg)
—	DF	ROU	Branimir Stefanovici (To Nuova Mama Mia Becicherecu Mic)

=== Balotești ===
In:

No.	Pos.	Nation	Player
—	MF	ROU	Andrei Rontea (On loan from Juventus București)
—	FW	ROU	Alexandru Nica (On loan from Juventus București)
—	DF	ROU	Bogdan Arapu (From Sport Team)
—	DF	ROU	Ciprian Dicu (From Tunari)
—	MF	ROU	Alin Gojnea (From Academica Clinceni)
—	MF	ROU	George Ivan (From Unirea Tărlungeni)
—	MF	ROU	Marian Neagu (From Free agent)
—	FW	ROU	Denis Dobra (From Dunărea Călărași)

Out:

No.	Pos.	Nation	Player
—	DF	ROU	Alin Iordache (To Voluntari)
—	MF	ROU	Călin Păduraru (To Inter Petrila)
—	FW	ROU	Marius Bâtfoi (To Târgu Mureș)
—	FW	ROU	Roland Stănescu (To Petrolul Ploiești)
—	DF	ROU	Alexandru Darie (To Free agent)
—	FW	ALB	Franc Bakalli (To Free agent)

=== Berceni (The club was dissolved) ===
In:

No.	Pos.	Nation	Player

Out:

No.	Pos.	Nation	Player

=== Brașov ===
In:

No.	Pos.	Nation	Player
—	MF	ROU	Sebastian Chitoșcă (On loan from Steaua București)
—	MF	ROU	Rareș Enceanu (On loan from Steaua București)
—	FW	ROU	Robert Moldoveanu (On loan from Dinamo București)
—	GK	ROU	Daniel Mutu (From Sepsi OSK Sfântu Gheorghe)
—	DF	ROU	Cosmin Cristil (From Voluntari)
—	DF	ROU	Alexandru Ichim (From Botoșani)
—	MF	ROU	Ionuț Tripșa (From (Italy) Cremonese)
—	FW	ROU	Alin Angelescu (From Gloria Popești-Leordeni)

Out:

No.	Pos.	Nation	Player
—	DF	ROU	Claudiu Săftescu (Loan return to Dinamo București)
—	MF	ROU	Laurențiu Manole (Loan return to Dinamo București)
—	MF	ROU	Vasile Petra (Loan return to Târgu Mureș)
—	MF	ROU	Florin Răsdan (Loan return to Concordia Chiajna)
—	MF	ROU	Alexandru Dîrstariu (On loan to AFC Hărman)
—	MF	ROU	Nicolae Roșu (On loan to AFC Hărman)
—	MF	ROU	Eduard Turdean (On loan to AFC Hărman)
—	GK	ROU	Vlad Ignat (To Metalul Reșița)
—	DF	ROU	Florin Cordoș (To Luceafărul Oradea)
—	DF	ROU	Mihai Leca (To (Wales) The New Saints)
—	MF	ROU	Claudiu Codoban (To Luceafărul Oradea)
—	MF	ROU	Horia Popa (To AFC Hărman)
—	MF	ROU	Robert Răducan (To Gloria Popești-Leordeni)
—	FW	ROU	Alexandru Avram (To Dunărea Călărași, previously on loan to AFC Hărman)

=== Chindia Târgoviște ===
In:

No.	Pos.	Nation	Player
—	GK	ROU	Cătălin Căbuz (On loan from Viitorul Constanța)
—	DF	ROU	Claudiu Săftescu (On loan from Dinamo București)
—	DF	ROU	Denis Dumitrașcu (From Râmnicu Vâlcea)

Out:

No.	Pos.	Nation	Player
—	DF	ROU	Valentin Neaga (On loan to Aninoasa)
—	GK	ROU	Alexandru Bicher (To Aninoasa)
—	MF	ROU	Andrei Neagoe (To Mioveni)
—	MF	ROU	Alberto Roșciugă (To Aninoasa)
—	DF	ROU	Bogdan Dinu (To Retired)

=== Dacia Unirea Brăila ===
In:

No.	Pos.	Nation	Player
—	GK	ROU	Albert Popa (From CSS Brașovia)
—	DF	ROU	Robert Moglan (From Afumați)

Out:

No.	Pos.	Nation	Player
—	DF	ROU	Alexandru Misarăș (Loan return to Viitorul Mihai Georgescu)
—	GK	ROU	Victor Gârlea (To ASU Politehnica Timișoara)
—	FW	ROU	Marco Enciu (To (Italy) Lanusei Calcio)
—	FW	ROU	Dragoș Mucuță (On loan to Sportul Chișcani)
—	FW	ROU	Alexandru Muscă (To Juventus București)
—	DF	ROU	Laurențiu Petean (To Retired)
—	MF	ROU	Sorin Frunză (To Retired)

=== Dunărea Călărași ===
In:

No.	Pos.	Nation	Player
—	DF	ROU	Ștefan Mardare (From Unirea Alba Iulia)
—	DF	ROU	Bogdan Şandru (From Pandurii Târgu Jiu)
—	MF	ROU	Alexandru Cincă (From Alexandria)
—	MF	ROU	Călin Cristea (From Râmnicu Vâlcea)
—	MF	ROU	Cristian Pușcaș (From (Iceland) Fjarðabyggðar)
—	MF	ROU	Bogdan Stancu (From Metalul Reșița)
—	FW	ROU	Alexandru Avram (From Brașov)
—	FW	ROU	Cătălin Țîră (From (Azerbaijan) Neftçi PFK)

Out:

No.	Pos.	Nation	Player
—	MF	ROU	Paul Radu (Loan return to Dinamo București)
—	MF	ROU	Victor Petre (On loan to Înainte Modelu)
—	DF	ROU	Daniel Barna (To (Germany) FC Pipinsried)
—	DF	ROU	Silviu Ilie (To Oțelul Galați)
—	MF	ROU	Ovidiu Popescu (To Atletic Bradu)
—	MF	SRB	Boris Živanović (To (Serbia) Borac Čačak)
—	FW	ROU	Denis Dobra (To Balotești)
—	DF	ROU	Bogdan Panait (To Free agent)

=== Foresta Suceava ===
In:

No.	Pos.	Nation	Player
—	DF	ROU	Lucian Asanache (On loan from Concordia Chiajna)
—	MF	ROU	Cosmin Buziuc (From LPS Suceava)
—	MF	ROU	Alin Florescu (From LPS Suceava)
—	MF	ROU	Alexandru Ivan (From Viitorul Liteni)
—	FW	ROU	Robert Grumezescu (From Free agent)
—	FW	ROU	Cătălin Vraciu (From Poli Timișoara)

Out:

No.	Pos.	Nation	Player
—	MF	ROU	Răzvan Avram (To Afumați)
—	FW	ROU	Vlad Bujor (To Sepsi Sfântu Gheorghe)
—	FW	ROU	Marius Matei (To Luceafărul Oradea)
—	MF	ROU	Cezar Bosînceanu (To Free agent)

=== Juventus București ===
In:

No.	Pos.	Nation	Player
—	GK	ROU	Andrei Burlui (From Free agent)
—	DF	ROU	Ioan Neag (From Râmnicu Vâlcea)
—	MF	ROU	Alexandru Zaharia (From Gaz Metan Mediaș)
—	FW	ROU	Adrian Hurdubei (From Aerostar Bacău)
—	FW	ROU	Alexandru Muscă (From Dacia Unirea Brăila)

Out:

No.	Pos.	Nation	Player
—	MF	ROU	Vlad Opriș (On loan to CSMȘ Reșița)
—	MF	ROU	Andrei Rontea (On loan to Balotești)
—	MF	ROU	Marian Stoenac (On loan to Cetate Deva)
—	FW	ROU	Alexandru Nica (On loan to Balotești)
—	DF	ROU	Roberto Alecsandru (To Petrolul Ploiești)
—	MF	ROU	Dragoș Arsu (To Free agent)

=== Luceafărul Oradea ===
In:

No.	Pos.	Nation	Player
—	MF	ROU	Sergiu Bactăr (Loan return from Metalurgistul Cugir)
—	FW	ROU	Paul Chiș-Toie (Loan return from Oşorhei)
—	GK	ROU	Răzvan Began (From CFR Cluj)
—	DF	ROU	Florin Cordoș (From Brașov)
—	DF	ROU	Darius Ursu (From Târgu Mureș)
—	MF	ROU	Claudiu Codoban (From Brașov)
—	MF	ROU	Bogdan Miholca (From Bistrița)
—	MF	ROU	Alin Predescu (From Gaz Metan Mediaș)
—	FW	ROU	Marius Matei (From Foresta Suceava)

Out:

No.	Pos.	Nation	Player
—	GK	ROU	Eduard Pap (To Târgu Mureș)
—	GK	ROU	Cosmin Verdeș (To Unirea Livada)
—	DF	ROU	Florin Ilie (To Pandurii Târgu Jiu)
—	DF	BFA	Salif Nogo (To Cetate Deva)
—	DF	ROU	Alexandru Radu (To Petrolul Ploiești)
—	MF	ROU	Zsombor Lukacs (To FK Miercurea Ciuc)
—	MF	ROU	Paul Păcurar (To Pandurii Târgu Jiu)
—	MF	ROU	Alexandru Sorian (To (Austria) SV Hollenburg)
—	FW	ROU	Cristian Cigan (To (Austria) SV Hollenburg)

=== Metalul Reșița ===
In:

No.	Pos.	Nation	Player
—	GK	ROU	Vlad Ignat (From Brașov)
—	DF	ROU	Valeriu Lupu (From Free agent)
—	DF	ROU	Cristian Munteanu (From Râmnicu Vâlcea)
—	DF	ROU	Daniel Stanca (From Înainte Modelu)
—	MF	ROU	Alexandru Dan (From Pandurii Târgu Jiu)
—	MF	ROU	Alin Pătrașcu (From Unirea Tărlungeni)
—	MF	ROU	Florian Pârvu (From Râmnicu Vâlcea)
—	MF	ROU	Alexandru Radu (From Gloria Popești-Leordeni)
—	MF	ROU	Constantin Vasile (From Râmnicu Vâlcea)
—	FW	ROU	Mihai Dina (From Râmnicu Vâlcea)

Out:

No.	Pos.	Nation	Player
—	GK	ROU	Angelco Prvulović (To (Germany) Spvgg 05 Oberrad)
—	DF	ROU	Eugen Matei (To Urban Titu)
—	MF	ROU	Robert Chira (To CS Tunari)
—	MF	ROU	Sebastian Ghinga (To Sepsi Sfântu Gheorghe)
—	MF	AFG	Modjieb Jamali (To (Montenegro) Dečić)
—	MF	GER	Hedon Selishta (To (Germany) TuS Erndtebrück)
—	MF	GRE	Evangelos Skraparas (To (Greece) Aiginiakos)
—	MF	ROU	Bogdan Stancu (To Dunărea Călărași)
—	MF	ROU	Claudiu Ștefan (To CS Podari)
—	MF	FRA	Ken Tassin (To (Bulgaria) Spartak Pleven)
—	FW	ROU	Ionel Dinu (To Olimpic Cetate Râșnov)
—	DF	ROU	Cristian Ionescu (To Retired)
—	MF	ROU	Răzvan Pădurețu (To Free agent)

=== Mioveni ===
In:

No.	Pos.	Nation	Player
—	MF	ROU	Robert Boboc (On loan from Astra Giurgiu)
—	DF	ROU	Cătălin Alexe (From Viitorul Constanța)
—	DF	ROU	Ionuț Burnea (From Unirea Tărlungeni)
—	MF	ROU	Andrei Neagoe (From Chindia Târgoviște)

Out:

No.	Pos.	Nation	Player
—	MF	ROU	Bogdan Stancu (To Academica Clinceni)

=== Olimpia Satu Mare ===
In:

No.	Pos.	Nation	Player
—	GK	ROU	Bogdan Dascălu (On loan from Sporting Pitești)
—	FW	ROU	Adrian Voicu (On loan from Voluntari)
—	MF	ROU	Cristian Daminuță (From (Israel) Hapoel Nir Ramat HaSharon)
—	MF	ROU	Iulian Roșu (From Poli Timișoara)
—	FW	ROU	Octavian Ursu (From Târgu Mureș)

Out:

No.	Pos.	Nation	Player
—	DF	ROU	Laurențiu Moldovan (On loan to CS Iernut)
—	MF	ROU	Horea Bîgiu (To UTA Arad)
—	MF	ROU	Dumitru Muntean (To UTA Arad)
—	MF	CIV	Brice Nanou (To Nuova Mama Mia Becicherecu Mic)
—	MF	ROU	Gabriel Roatiș (To Unirea Tășnad)
—	MF	ROU	Rareș Takács (To Universitatea Cluj)
—	FW	ROU	Gabriel Cădar (To Unirea Tășnad)
—	GK	ROU	Andrei Preda (To Free agent)

=== Râmnicu Vâlcea (The senior team was dissolved) ===
In:

No.	Pos.	Nation	Player

Out:

No.	Pos.	Nation	Player
—	GK	ROU	Cătălin Căbuz (Loan return to Viitorul Constanța)
—	GK	ROU	Vlad Muțiu (Loan return to Dinamo București)
—	MF	ROU	Stephan Drăghici (Loan return to CSU Craiova)
—	GK	ROU	Sorin Radu (On loan to Șirineasa)
—	GK	ROU	Rareș Sporea (On loan to Atletic Bradu)
—	GK	ROU	Iustin Teodorescu (On loan to Șirineasa)
—	DF	ROU	Sorin Bușu (On loan to Pandurii Târgu Jiu)
—	DF	NGR	Samson Nwabueze (On loan to Pandurii Târgu Jiu)
—	DF	ROU	Bogdan Popescu (On loan to Șirineasa)
—	DF	ROU	Marian Roșianu (On loan to Șirineasa)
—	MF	ROU	Alexandru Chiripuș (On loan to Șirineasa)
—	MF	ROU	Radu Georgescu (On loan to Șirineasa)
—	MF	ROU	Raul Horumbă (On loan to Șirineasa)
—	MF	ROU	Marian Ion (On loan to Șirineasa)
—	MF	ROU	Mario Pistrițu (On loan to CS U Craiova)
—	MF	ROU	Valentin Târș (On loan to CS U Craiova)
—	FW	ROU	Darius Preda (On loan to Șirineasa)
—	FW	ROU	Antonio Spîrleanu (On loan to CS U Craiova)
—	FW	ROU	Robert Tănăsescu (On loan to Șirineasa)
—	GK	ROU	Rareș Sporea (To Atletic Bradu)
—	DF	ROU	Denis Dumitrașcu (To Chindia Târgoviște)
—	DF	ROU	Nicușor Mocanu (Loan return to Ardealul Cluj, later on loan to Unirea Jucu)
—	DF	ROU	Cristian Munteanu (To Metalul Reșița)
—	DF	ROU	Ioan Neag (To Juventus București)
—	DF	ROU	Cătălin Pârvulescu (To Hermannstadt)
—	MF	ROU	Adrian Cîrstea (To CS Podari)
—	MF	ROU	Călin Cristea (To Dunărea Călărași)
—	MF	ROU	Bogdan Geantă (To (Germany) Cosmos Aystetten)
—	MF	ROU	Ovidiu Mihai (To (Germany) Cosmos Aystetten)
—	MF	ROU	Florian Pârvu (To Metalul Reșița)
—	MF	ROU	Cosmin Piscanu (To SCM Pitești)
—	MF	ROU	Daniel Stana (To Pandurii Târgu Jiu)
—	MF	ROU	Constantin Vasile (To Metalul Reșița)
—	FW	ROU	Grigore Ceapă (To Atletic Bradu)
—	FW	ROU	Mihai Dina (To Metalul Reșița)
—	FW	ROU	Constantin Stoica (To SCM Pitești)
—	FW	ROU	Florin Costea (To Free agent)

=== Sepsi Sfântu Gheorghe ===
In:

No.	Pos.	Nation	Player
—	DF	ROU	Vlad Olteanu (On loan from Dinamo București)
—	MF	ROU	Laurențiu Manole (On loan from Dinamo București)
—	MF	ROU	Sebastian Ghinga (From Metalul Reșița)
—	MF	ROU	Răzvan Greu (On loan from Botoșani)
—	MF	ROU	Sandu Iovu (From Unirea Dej)
—	FW	ROU	Vlad Bujor (From Foresta Suceava)

Out:

No.	Pos.	Nation	Player
—	DF	ROU	Zsolt Tankó (On loan to KSE Târgu Secuiesc)
—	FW	ROU	Benjamin Bagoly (On loan to AFC Odorheiu Secuiesc)
—	GK	ROU	Daniel Mutu (To Brașov)
—	DF	ROU	Andrei Țepeș (To FK Miercurea Ciuc)
—	DF	ROU	Armando Mihai (To Free agent)

=== Șoimii Pâncota (The club was dissolved) ===
In:

No.	Pos.	Nation	Player

Out:

No.	Pos.	Nation	Player

=== Unirea Tărlungeni (The club was dissolved) ===
In:

No.	Pos.	Nation	Player

Out:

No.	Pos.	Nation	Player
—	GK	ROU	Alexandru Gudea (Loan return to Concordia Chiajna)
—	GK	ROU	Iustin Popescu (Loan return to Dinamo București)
—	DF	ROU	Mihai Zamfir (Loan return to Dinamo București)
—	MF	ROU	Vasile Mihai (Loan return to Voluntari)
—	GK	ROU	Felix Manciu (To CS Tunari)
—	DF	ROU	Mihai Alecsandru (To Agricola Borcea)
—	DF	ROU	Ionuț Burnea (To Mioveni)
—	DF	ROU	Ionel Ciortan (To CS Tunari)
—	DF	ROU	Gabriel Lazăr (To Unirea Slobozia)
—	MF	ROU	Gabriel Bragă (To CS Tunari)
—	MF	ROU	George Ivan (To Balotești)
—	MF	ROU	Cosmin Mihai (To Pandurii Târgu Jiu)
—	MF	ROU	Ștefan Niculae (To Metaloglobus București)
—	MF	ROU	Alin Pătrașcu (To Metalul Reșița)
—	MF	MDA	Alexandru Podlesnîi (To Olimpic Cetate Râșnov)
—	MF	ROU	Ionuț Zaina (To Pandurii Târgu Jiu)
—	FW	ROU	Andrei Sin (To Târgu Mureș)
—	DF	ROU	Radu Dragne (To Free agent)
—	DF	ROU	Epaminonda Nicu (To Free agent)
—	DF	ROU	Alin Stoica (To Free agent)
—	MF	ROU	Iustin Anghel (To Free agent)
—	MF	ROU	Deian Nicolici (To Free agent)
—	MF	CMR	Mathias Mbabi (To Free agent)
—	MF	ROU	Marius Tigoianu (To Free agent)
—	FW	ROU	Albert Voinea (To Free agent)

=== UTA Arad ===
In:

No.	Pos.	Nation	Player
—	FW	ROU	Robert Vâlceanu (On loan from Steaua București)
—	DF	MKD	Mevlan Adili (From (North Macedonia) Shkupi)
—	DF	ROU	Bruno Vasiu (From Viitorul Constanța)
—	MF	ROU	Horea Bîgiu (From Olimpia Satu Mare)
—	MF	ROU	Dumitru Muntean (From Olimpia Satu Mare)

Out:

No.	Pos.	Nation	Player
—	DF	ROU	Daniel Celea (To FC Zalău)
—	MF	ROU	Radu Ungurianu (To FC Zalău)
—	FW	ROU	Kevin Trabalka (To Șoimii Lipova)
—	FW	ROU	Teodor Ignea (To Aerostar Bacău)
