= Gábor Vida =

Gábor Vida may refer to:

- Gábor Vida (figure skater) (1929–2022), Hungarian figure skater
- Gábor Vida (writer) (born 1968), Hungarian writer
