= John Balaban =

John Balaban may refer to:

- John Balaban (poet) (born 1943), American poet and translator
- John Balaban (serial killer) (1924–1953), Romanian serial killer
