= Predescu =

Predescu is a Romanian surname that may refer to:

- Alin Predescu (born 1995), Romanian footballer
- Cornel Predescu (born 1987), Romanian footballer
- Marlena Predescu (born 1951), Romanian rower
- Valeria Peter Predescu (1947–2009), Romanian singer
