= Bucegi Stadium =

Multi-purpose stadium in Romania

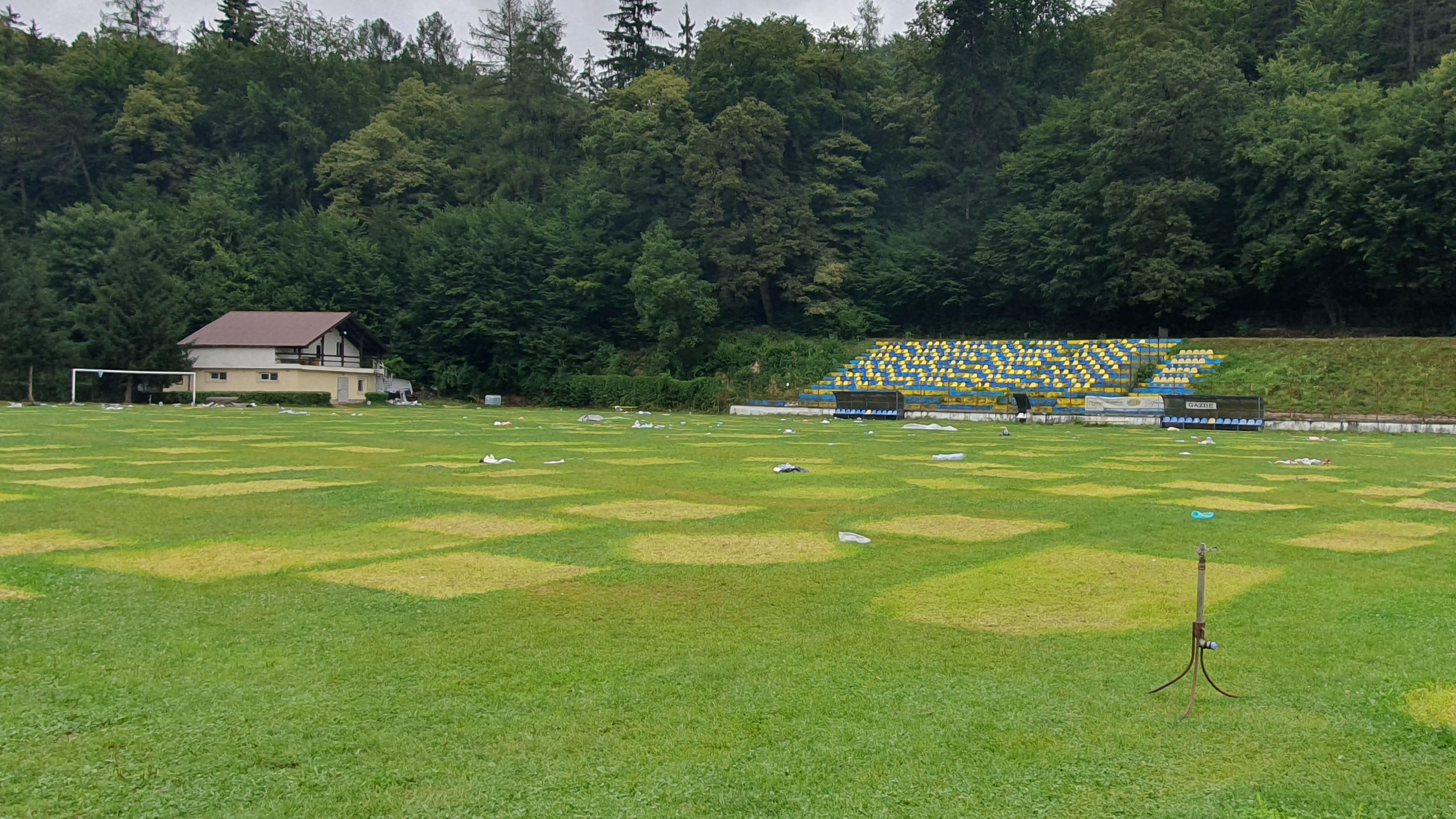
- Interactive map of Bucegi Stadium
- Address: Str. Cetății 34
- Location: Râșnov, Romania
- Coordinates: 45°35′23.6″N 25°28′31.3″E
- Owner: Town of Râșnov
- Operator: Olimpic Cetate Râșnov
- Capacity: 3,000 (600 seated)
- Surface: Grass

Construction
- Opened: 1920s

Tenant
- Olimpic Cetate Râșnov (1930–present)

The Bucegi Stadium is a multi-purpose stadium in Râșnov, Romania. It is currently used mostly for football matches, is the home ground of Olimpic Cetate Râșnov and holds 3,000 people (600 on seats).
