= Sergiu Samarian =

Romanian-German chess player and coach

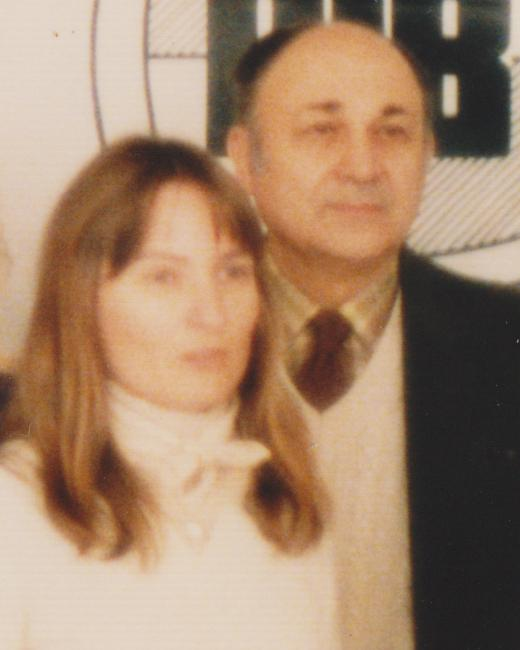
Stepanka Vokralova and Sergiu Samarian, 1985 at Bad Lauterberg

Sergiu Samarian (10 June 1923, in Chişineu-Criş, Romania – 3 June 1991, in Heidelberg) was a Romanian–German chess master and coach.

Samarian played in 1st European Individual Chess Championship (Europameisterschaft) at Munich 1942, and tied for 7-8th in Wertungsturnier (Qualification Tournament, Gösta Danielsson won) there. In 1946, he was awarded a Romanian chess master title. He received the International Correspondence Chess Master title in 1973.

He was the author of the 1974 book "The Queen's Gambit Declined" published in English in 1974 by Chess Digest, Inc., Dallas Texas. The book was translated by Grev Corbett and Patrick Miles and has no ISBN.

Samarian was a Romanian national coach both for men's and women's teams. He emigrated to West Germany in 1976, and became a German national coach for women's team.
