= Chișineu-Criș =

- Town
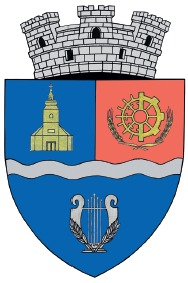
- Coat of arms

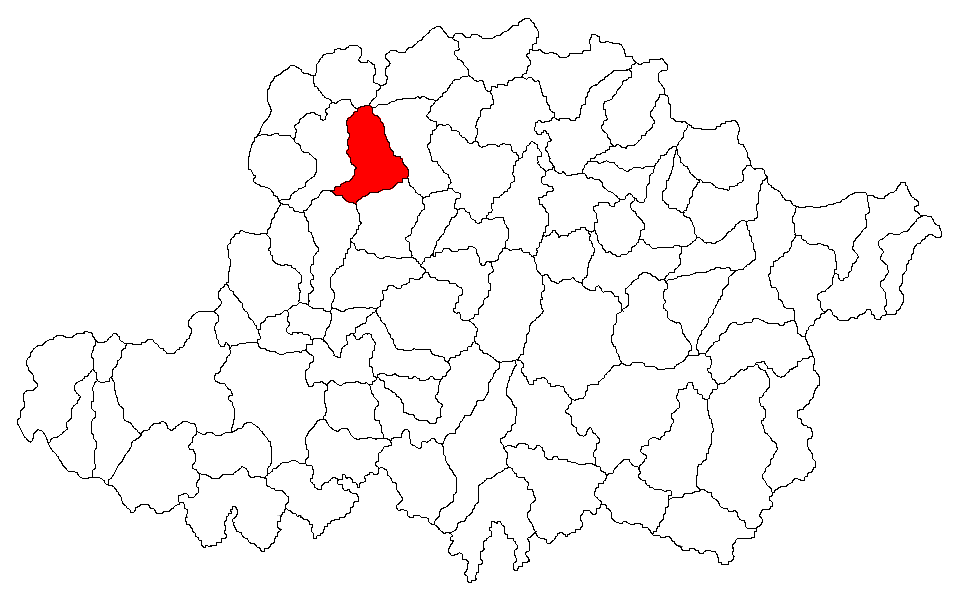
- Location in Arad County

- Location in Romania
- Coordinates: 46°31′21″N 21°30′57″E
- Country: Romania
- County: Arad

Government
  - Mayor (2024–2028): Ovidiu-Ioan Guleș (REPER)
- Area: 119 km^{2} (46 sq mi)
- Elevation: 127 m (417 ft)
- Population (2021-12-01): 7,212
  - Density: 60.6/km^{2} (157/sq mi)
- Time zone: UTC+02:00 (EET)
  - Summer (DST): UTC+03:00 (EEST)
- Postal code: 315100
- Area code: (+40) 02 57
- Vehicle reg.: AR
- Website: www.chisineucris.ro

Chișineu-Criș (Hungarian: Kisjenő) is a town in Arad County, Crișana, Romania.

== Geography ==
The town is situated on the north-western side of the county, at a 43 km (27 mi) distance from Arad, the county seat. The administrative territory stretches over 119 km^{2} (46 sq mi) on the Crișul Alb Plateau, on both sides of the river Crișul Alb. The town was formed by merging the villages of Chișineu Mic and Pădureni (Erdőhegy). The town administers one village, Nădab (Nadab).

== Demographics ==
Historical population
Year	Pop.	±%
1910	2,821	—
1977	8,913	+216.0%
1992	9,021	+1.2%
2002	8,724	−3.3%
2011	7,577	−13.1%
2021	7,212	−4.8%
Source: Census data

In 1910, the town had 2,821 inhabitants: 1,376 (48.8%) spoke Hungarian, 1,355 (48%) spoke Romanian, 49 (1.7%) spoke German. At the 2011 census, it had 7,577 inhabitants, of which 73.5% were Romanians, 19.3% Hungarians, and 6.3% Roma. At the 2021 census, Chișineu-Criș had a population of 7,212.

== Economy ==
Although the town economy is predominant agricultural, during the last decade the second and third economic sectors had a growing evolution. For most of the tourists Chișineu-Criș is a transit town towards central and Western Europe. The most attractive sightseeing spot of the town is the Crișul Alb River and its banks covered with abundant vegetation.

== Tourist attractions ==
The archaeological discoveries brought to light traces of habitation much older than the documentary attestation of the town. The most important archaeological discoveries that attest the continuity of habitation in the area revealed objects older than 2,500 years in several locations of the town. Also two settlements dated back to the 3rd – 5th and 10th – 11th centuries were found here.

Chișineu-Criș was first mentioned as "villa Jeneusol" in the years 1202–1203. Nădab village is attested in a document of 1334 as "Nodob".

== Natives ==
- John Balaban
- Zoltan Balogh
- Adalbert Boros
- Claudiu Drăgan
- Gheorghe Gaston Marin
- George Pirtea
- Sergiu Samarian
- Gábor Vida
