= Alexandru David =

Romanian professional footballer

Personal information
- Date of birth: 15 June 1991 (age 35)
- Place of birth: Brașov, Romania
- Height: 1.80 m (5 ft 11 in)
- Position: Defender

Team information
- Current team: Cetate Râșnov
- Number: 22

Senior career*
Years	Team	Apps	(Gls)
2008–2015	Brașov	21	(0)
2008–2010	→ Snagov (loan)	42	(0)
2010–2011	→ Otopeni (loan)	7	(0)
2011–2012	→ Arieșul Turda (loan)	11	(0)
2013–2014	→ FC Clinceni (loan)	19	(0)
2014–2015	→ Academica Argeş (loan)	12	(0)
2016	Petrolul Ploiești	10	(0)
2016–2017	UTA Arad	18	(0)
2017	AFC Hărman	12	(0)
2018–2019	Oțelul Galați	29	(0)
2020	Oțelul Galați	1	(0)
2020–	Cetate Râșnov	82	(0)
- * Club domestic league appearances and goals as of 09:26, 28 December 2024 (UTC)

Alexandru David (born 15 June 1991) is a Romanian professional footballer who plays as a right defender for Olimpic Cetate Râșnov. He is currently the captain of Olimpic Cetate Râșnov, and plays with the number 22.
