= Andrei Poverlovici =

Romanian footballer

Personal information
- Date of birth: 17 October 1985 (age 41)
- Place of birth: Brașov, Romania
- Height: 1.79 m (5 ft 10 in)
- Position: Defender

Senior career*
Years	Team	Apps	(Gls)
2003–2008	Brașov	25	(0)
2008–2011	Unirea Alba Iulia	52	(5)
2011	Victoria Brănești	6	(0)
2011–2014	Botoșani	30	(3)
2014	Corona Brașov	8	(0)
2014–2015	Voluntari	4	(0)
2015–2017	Brașov	41	(1)
2017–2018	AFC Hărman	11	(1)
2018	SR Brașov	23	(8)
2019–2022	Olimpic Cetate Râșnov	41	(4)
Total		241	(22)
- * Club domestic league appearances and goals as of 07:41, 21 June 2022 (UTC)

Andrei Poverlovici (born 17 October 1985) is a former Romanian footballer who played as a defender. He retired in 2022, after last playing for Liga III club Olimpic Cetate Râșnov. In his career, Poverlovici also played for teams such as FC Brașov, Unirea Alba Iulia, Victoria Brănești, FC Botoșani or SR Brașov, among others.
