= ACS Olimpic Cetate Râșnov =

Romanian football club

Olimpic Cetate Râșnov
- Full name: Asociația Clubul Sportiv; Olimpic Cetate Râșnov
- Nicknames: Galben-Albaștrii (The Yellow and Blues); Râșnovenii (The People from Râșnov)
- Short name: Râșnov
- Founded: 1930; 96 years ago as FC Râșnov; 2007; 19 years ago (refounded)
- Ground: Bucegi
- Capacity: 3,000 (600 seated)
- Owner: Râșnov Town
- Chairman: Bogdan Ene
- Manager: Lucian Petre
- League: Liga IV
- 2024–25: Liga III, Seria VI, 9th (relegated)
Home colours	Away colours

Asociația Clubul Sportiv Olimpic Cetate Râșnov, commonly known as Olimpic Cetate Râțnov or Cetate Râșnov, is a Romanian football club based in Râșnov, Brașov County, currently playing in Liga III.

== History ==
Olimpic Cetate Râșnov was founded in 1930 as FC Râșnov and played for all its history at regional and county championships until 2016. In 2007 the club was reorganized and missed a promotion to Liga III at the end of the 2012–13 season.

At the end of the 2015–16 season, under the leadership of Ioan Sima, the team won Liga IV – Brașov County and prevailed against Unirea Cristuru Secuiesc, the winner of Liga IV – Harghita County, in the promotion play-off. After a 3–3 draw on aggregate (1–3 away and 2–0 at home), promotion to Liga III was secured on the away goals rule.

At the end of the 2016–17 Liga III season, the first season for the club at Liga III, Galben-Albaștrii finished in 7th place.

== Honours ==
=== Leagues ===
Liga IV – Brașov County

- Winners (2): 2012–13, 2015–16

=== Cups ===
Cupa României – Brașov County

- Runners-up (1): 2013–14

== Players ==
=== First team squad ===
As of 10 September 2024

Note: Flags indicate national team as defined under FIFA eligibility rules; some limited exceptions apply. Players may hold more than one non-FIFA nationality.

No.	Pos.	Nation	Player
2	DF	ROU	Robert Balint
3	DF	ROU	Eugen Ghețu
4	MF	ROU	Radu Leonte
7	FW	ROU	Alexandru Vîrlan
8	MF	ROU	Andrei Nicoloiu
10	FW	ROU	Alexandru Toderașcu
11	MF	ROU	Darius Ghiță
12	GK	ROU	Tudor Drăghici
13	GK	ROU	Andrei Dumitru
17	MF	ROU	Paul Băican
18	MF	ROU	Raul Dumitrovici
19	DF	ROU	Răzvan Dragomir
20	MF	ROU	David Recuci

No.	Pos.	Nation	Player
21	MF	ROU	Dan Lupan
22	DF	ROU	Alexandru David (Captain)
23	MF	ROU	Andrei Mitu
29	MF	ROU	Darius Ciopo
30	MF	ITA	Massimiliano Apa
32	FW	ROU	Sebastian Racz
37	DF	ROU	Sorin Marin
77	DF	ROU	Cezar Ciucă
78	GK	ROU	Marco Tudose
87	DF	ROU	Adrian Voicu
98	FW	ROU	Bogdan Roșu
99	MF	ROU	Bogdan Racz

=== Out on loan ===
Note: Flags indicate national team as defined under FIFA eligibility rules; some limited exceptions apply. Players may hold more than one non-FIFA nationality.

No. / Pos. / Nation / Player	No. / Pos. / Nation / Player

== Club officials ==
=== Board of directors ===
Role	Name
Owner	(Romania) Râșnov Town
President	(Romania) Bogdan Ene
Sporting Director	(Romania) Nicu Badea
Delegate	(Romania) Gabriel Guteanu

=== Current technical staff ===
Role	Name
Manager	(Romania) Lucian Petre
Assistant Coach	(Romania) Sorin Marin

== League history ==
Season	Tier	Division	Place	Notes	Cupa României
2024–25	3	Liga III (Seria VI)	9th	Relegated	
2023–24	3	Liga III (Seria V)	3rd		
2022–23	3	Liga III (Seria V)	4th		
2021–22	3	Liga III (Seria V)	3rd		First Round
2020–21	3	Liga III (Seria V)	4th		
2019–20	3	Liga III (Seria III)	9th		

Season	Tier	Division	Place	Notes	Cupa României
2018–19	3	Liga III (Seria V)	4th		
2017–18	3	Liga III (Seria I)	6th		
2016–17	3	Liga III (Seria I)	7th		
2015–16	4	Liga IV (BV)	1st (C)	Promoted	
2014–15	4	Liga IV (BV)	7th		
2012–13	4	Liga IV (BV)	1st (C)		

== Notable former players ==
The footballers mentioned below have played at least 1 season for Olimpic Cetate Râșnov and also played in Liga I for another team.

- (Romania) Daniel Mutu
- (Romania) Alexandru David
- (Romania) Andrei Poverlovici
- (Romania) Radu Leonte
- (Romania) Alin Damian
- (Romania) Șerban Moraru
- (Romania) Sorin Strătilă

== Former managers ==
- (Romania) Daniel Bona (2016–2018)
- (Romania) Romeo Surdu (2020)
