= Yuval Jakobovich =

Israeli footballer (born 1992)

Personal information
- Full name: Yuval Zvi Jakobovich
- Date of birth: 9 November 1992 (age 34)
- Place of birth: Kfar Saba, Israel
- Height: 1.72 m (5 ft 8 in)
- Position: Central midfielder

Senior career*
Years	Team	Apps	(Gls)
2010–2013	Hapoel Kfar Saba	30	(1)
2013–2016	Maccabi Petah Tikva	53	(1)
2016	ASA Târgu Mureș	9	(0)
2017	Hapoel Kfar Saba	9	(0)
2017–2019	Ashdod	41	(2)
- * Club domestic league appearances and goals

Yuval Zvi Jakobovich (Hebrew: יובל יעקובוביץ; born 9 November 1992) is an Israeli footballer who plays as a midfielder. In 2016 he went with fellow Israeli player, Alon Netzer to play in Romania for Liga I club ASA Târgu Mureș.
