= Răzvan Avram =

Romanian footballer

Personal information
- Full name: Răzvan George Avram
- Date of birth: 12 September 1986 (age 40)
- Place of birth: Bucharest, Romania
- Height: 1.78 m (5 ft 10 in)
- Position: Right winger

Youth career
- Steaua București

Senior career*
Years	Team	Apps	(Gls)
2010–2011	FCM Câmpina	45	(10)
2011–2012	Prefab 05 Modelu	13	(1)
2010–2011	Victoria Brănești	24	(2)
2011–2015	Gaz Metan Mediaș	65	(3)
2015–2016	Brașov	24	(3)
2016	Foresta Suceava	14	(0)
2017–2024	Afumați	106	(25)

International career
	Romania U-17	3	(3)
- * Club domestic league appearances and goals as of 13:51, 11 January 2024 (UTC)

Răzvan Avram (born 12 September 1986 in Bucharest, Romania) is a Romanian footballer.

== Honours ==
CS Afumați

- Liga III: 2020–21, 2021–22
