= Bogdan Dănăricu =

Romanian footballer

Personal information
- Full name: Bogdan Nicolae Dănăricu
- Date of birth: 20 January 1995 (age 31)
- Place of birth: Târgu Jiu, Romania
- Height: 1.78 m (5 ft 10 in)
- Position: Midfielder

Youth career
- Pandurii Târgu Jiu

Senior career*
Years	Team	Apps	(Gls)
2014–2020	Pandurii Târgu Jiu	20	(7)
2015–2016	→ Pandurii II Târgu Jiu		
2016	→ ASU Politehnica (loan)	14	(1)
2020–2024	Gilortul Târgu Cărbunești	89	(25)
- * Club domestic league appearances and goals as of 12:53, 8 December 2024 (UTC)

Bogdan Nicolae Dănăricu (born 20 January 1995) is a Romanian professional footballer who plays as a midfielder.
