= John Balaban (serial killer) =

Romanian-born serial killer

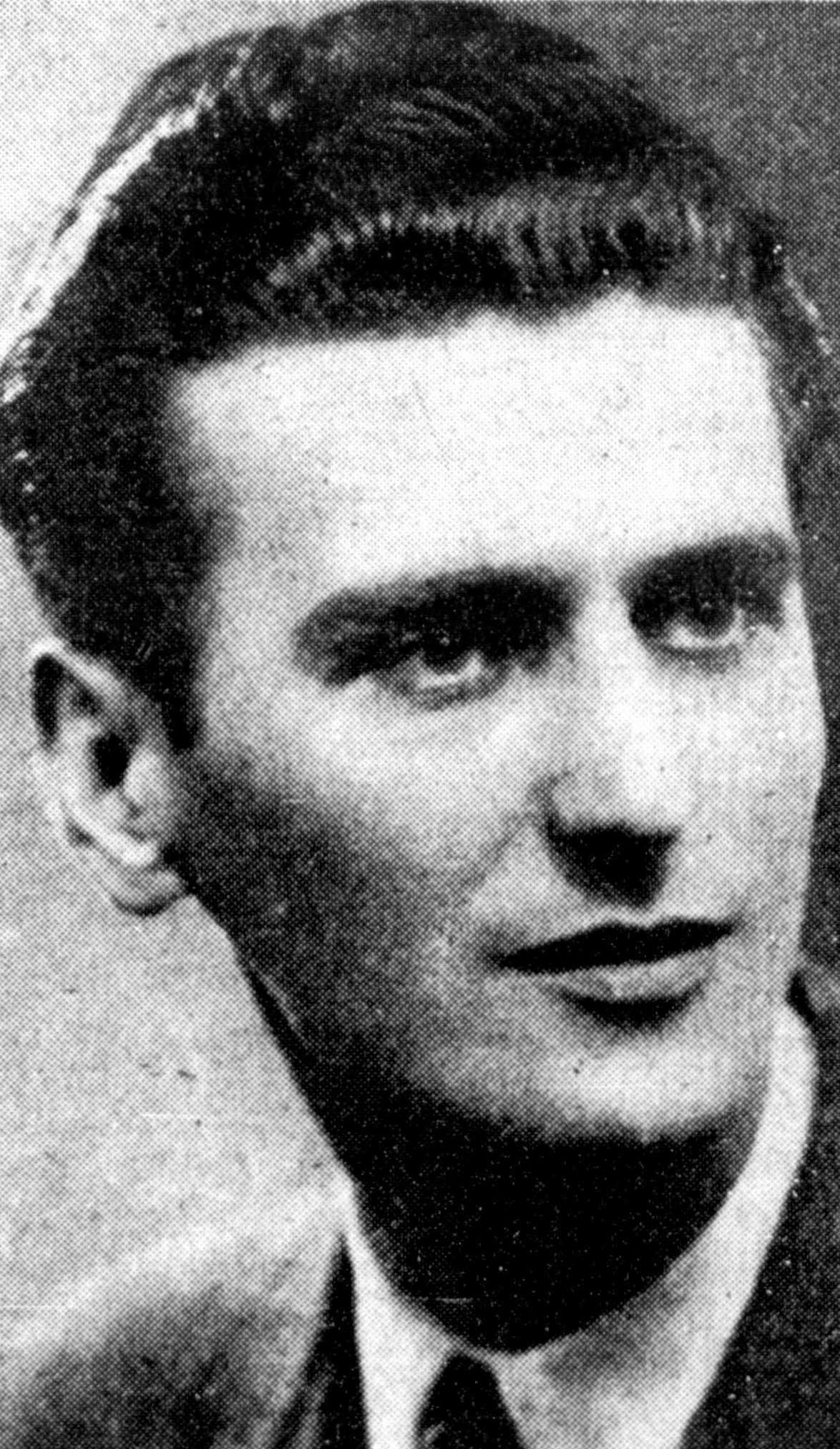
- Balaban in 1952
- Born: Ioan Balaban; 13 April 1924; Nădab, Arad County, Kingdom of Romania
- Died: 26 August 1953 (aged 29); Adelaide Gaol, South Australia
- Other name: JJoan Balaban
- Status: Executed by hanging
- Conviction: Murder
- Penalty: Death

Details
- Victims: 5
- Span of crimes: 1948–1953
- Country: France, Australia
- States: Île-de-France, South Australia
- Date apprehended: 12 April 1953

Ioan "John" Balaban (13 April 1924 – 26 August 1953) was a Romanian-born serial killer who confessed to murdering five people in France and Australia. Balaban moved to Australia in 1951 and settled in Adelaide, South Australia, where he carried out four murders, including those of his wife, her son and mother. He was executed for his crimes at Adelaide Gaol in August 1953.

== Biography ==
=== Early life ===
Ioan Balaban was born in April 1924 at Nădab, Arad County, in western Romania. According to Balaban's later unsworn statement, his parents separated because of his father's cruelty; his father "used to drink excessively" and died of suicide by hanging.

In 1944, Balaban began to read books on philosophy and "came to the conclusion there was no God". Despite his atheism, Balaban claimed God appeared to him on one occasion and told him to "do anything your conscience dictates and you will be happy". In May 1946, "after a fight with some Communists", he was detained in a mental hospital at Cluj for three weeks. During this period of his life, Balaban obtained a degree in physics and metallurgy. He joined the Romanian army for nine months, but "escaped to France" in October 1947 during the time when the Soviets were consolidating their occupation of Romania.

=== Murder in Paris ===
On the night of 22 February 1948 (or the early hours of the following morning), Balaban murdered a 32-year-old Polish woman, Riva Kwas, at her studio-apartment in the Auteuil district of Paris, near the Porte de Saint-Cloud. Kwas was working in Paris as a chemist, and her body was discovered five days after her murder. According to his later confession, Balaban was in "a rage" because the woman did not want to engage in sexual intercourse, and strangled her. He claimed: "I did not have any intention of killing her, but I had the feeling I had to". Immediately after the murder Balaban changed his place of abode and then left France.

The murder of Riva Kwas remained unsolved until Balaban was detained and charged for murders committed in Australia. In April 1953, the Adelaide police informed Alexander Duncan, the Chief Commissioner of the Victorian Police and the Australian rapporteur for Interpol, that the prisoner had confessed to the murder of a woman named Riva Kwas in Paris in 1948. Interpol passed this information to the French Sûreté and the Paris Prefecture who confirmed details of the crime. In August 1953, Balaban made a written confession of the murder in his condemned cell at Adelaide Gaol. As part of his confession, he answered questions submitted by the French authorities where he recalled street names and house numbers in connection with the murder.

=== Immigration to Australia ===
Balaban arrived in Australia in January 1951 aboard the Hellenic Prince, part of the extensive post-war immigration to Australia. Balaban's occupation on his immigration record was listed as "chemist". The vessel carried 954 passengers, representing 18 nationalities from "all parts of Europe". Most of the immigrants were "displaced persons". One group came from Paris where they had lived privately "and were not used to camp life"; they had expected to travel to Australia "under first class conditions" but "their illusions were soon shattered when they encountered the communal life of the displaced persons ship". During the voyage to Australia, Balaban "had a fight with a migration official" and was locked up in the ship's cells. The passengers on the Hellenic Prince were to have disembarked at Fremantle, but instructions were received during the voyage to proceed to Melbourne.

By early November 1951, John Balaban was living in Adelaide, South Australia. In that month, a letter from Balaban was published in the Adelaide Advertiser newspaper, advocating that the Department of Immigration utilise phonograph discs for teaching English to New Australians. Balaban's address was given as Whitmore Square in Adelaide.

During his time in Australia, Balaban was employed in such work as grape-picking, oxy-welding and labouring. Even though newspaper reports claimed he was an industrial or metallurgical chemist, he was unable to find work in this field in Australia.

Balaban met a divorced woman named Thelma Cadd, who was the proprietor of a café called the 'Sunshine Snack Shop' in Gouger Street, Adelaide. She lived above the café with her six-year-old son Phillip. Thelma's 65-year-old mother, Susan Ackland, often stayed at the Gouger Street address, although her normal place of abode was recorded as Churchill Street in suburban Kilburn. John Balaban and Thelma Cadd (née Ackland) were married on 27 September 1952 in the Clayton Congregational Church, in the Adelaide suburb of Norwood.

However, the marriage was short-lived and troubled; by December 1952 the couple had separated and Balaban was living in a room in Gover Street, North Adelaide. Balaban later blamed the separation from his wife in large measure upon his mother-in-law; in a statement to the police after he had murdered both his wife and mother-in-law, Balaban claimed that Susan Ackland "always interfered", adding "she made trouble for my wife, and her first husband, and she'd do the same thing with me and my wife".

=== Murder of Zora Kusic ===
In the early evening of 5 December 1952, the mutilated body of Zora Kusic, a 29-year-old Yugoslav migrant, was discovered in her tin shack at the rear of a boarding-house in North Parade, in the west Adelaide suburb of Torrensville. The dead woman was found by a friend, a Bulgarian migrant, one of ten New Australians living in the North Parade boarding-house. Kusic was found lying on her bed with her throat and side gashed and her body mutilated by knife cuts. A penknife was found in a bloodstained dish of water near the bed.

The day after Zora Kusic's death, police officers visited Balaban's room in Gover Street and questioned him. Copies of newspapers containing reports of the murder were found on his bed. Balaban was shown a photograph of Kusic and initially denied he had known her. He was taken to the Detective Office where he repeated his denials. He was then allowed to return to his home, but two days later, after detectives had made further enquiries, Balaban was arrested. Faced with testimony by other witnesses, Balaban now admitted to meeting Kusic at a city hotel while he was drinking there with another Romanian man. After his companion departed, Balaban claimed he and Kusic left the hotel and travelled in a taxi to another hotel in Torrensville, but denied he had gone with Kusic to her room. Several days later, Balaban was arrested and charged for the crime; he was remanded in custody for a fortnight while the police obtained statements to support the case. Balaban's remand was later extended.

In early January 1953, a hearing of the case against Ioan Balaban on the charge of having murdered Zora Kusic was held over five days before the Police Magistrate L. E. Clarke. After all the evidence had been presented the Police Magistrate decided that, although the case had established "the utmost gravity of suspicion" against the defendant, it was insufficient to present a prima facie case of guilt on the murder charge; in the magistrate's opinion "no jury would be likely to convict on the evidence". At the conclusion of the hearing on 12 January 1953, the defendant was discharged. Balaban "wept as he left the dock".

On the day after his discharge by the court, Balaban was interviewed by reporters. The article subsequently published in the Adelaide News described Balaban as "a handsome 29-year-old" who was "pale and lined after his five-day court ordeal" and incorrectly stated he had been acquitted. Balaban told the reporters, "in his peculiar, quiet, broken English", that he felt "born again" and wanted "only to take long walks through the city streets, and study the people". He said "that when he earned enough money to buy a typewriter he would write a novel on the 'ups and downs' of his life".

A month later, after his apprehension for the murder of his wife and mother-in-law, Balaban confessed to the murder of Zora Kusic. He admitted to meeting her 5 December 1952 at the Royal Admiral Hotel in Hindley Street, before hiring a taxi and going with her to her room behind the Torrensville boarding-house. They had drunk beer together and Balaban claimed Kusic had asked for five pounds in exchange for sex. Stating that "he was very much against prostitutes", Balaban added: "it was the way she asked me that made me refuse her and subsequently kill her". He found a penknife in the room with which he killed and mutilated her, later washing his hands in a dish of water in which he left the knife. After committing the murder, Balaban went to the Southern Cross Hotel in King William Street.

=== The Sunshine Café murders ===
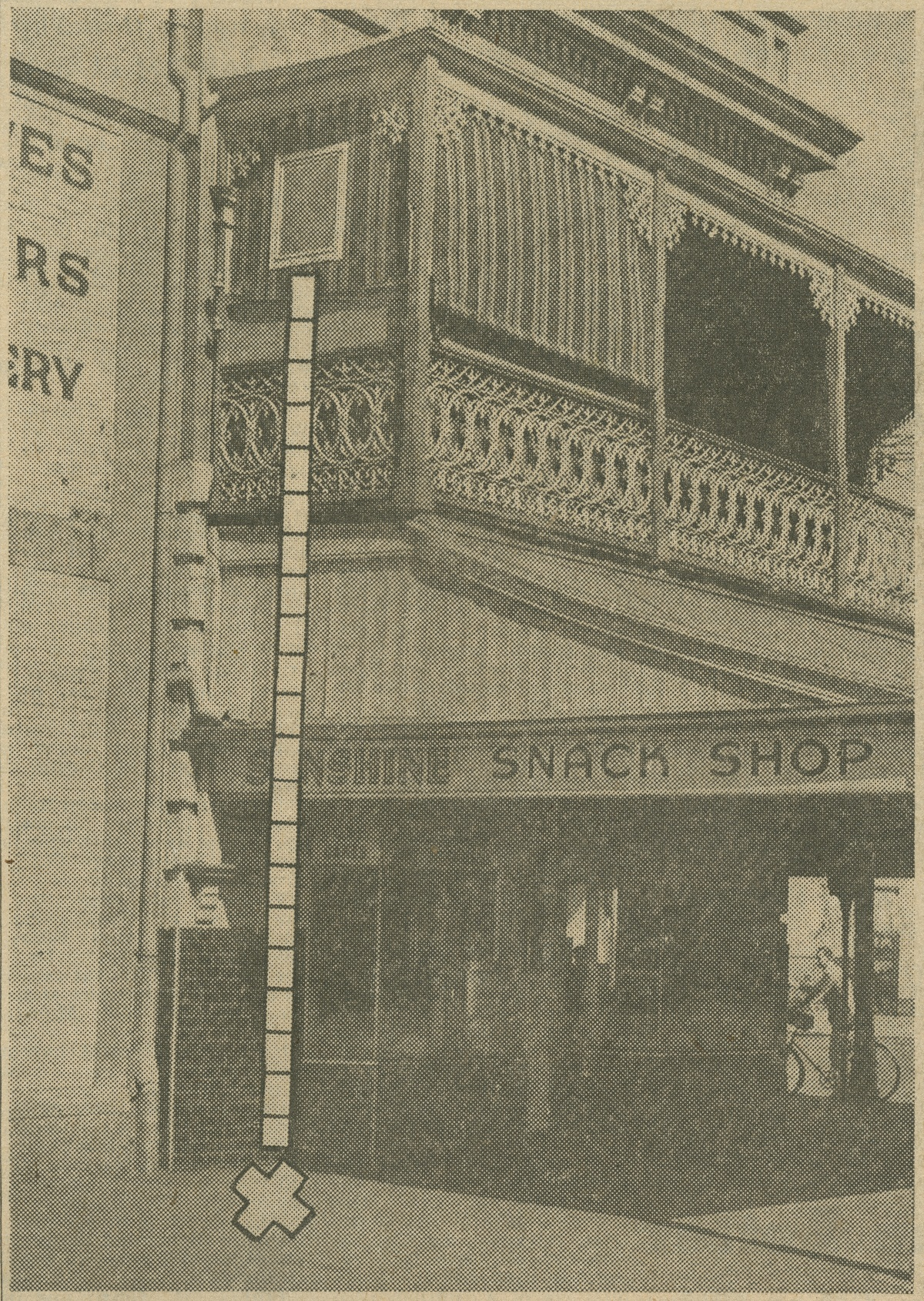
The Sunshine Snack Shop, Gouger Street in Adelaide, showing where Verna Manie jumped from a window to escape from her attacker.

Balaban claimed "he went back to his wife" on 23 February 1953, adding that "she began to complain again". On April 11, he left again "and had some drink". By his own account, Balaban then went on a drunken, violent rampage along the banks of the River Torrens. In a river-side toilet block he fought with a young woman. He found an iron bar near the University Footbridge and hit a man sleeping on the ground behind Adelaide Oval. Near the Victoria Bridge, Balaban encountered an Aboriginal man and "a white woman". He drank with the couple, but then hit the man with the iron bar. Near the Torrens tennis courts he was chased by another man, but Balaban hit him with the bar. In court Balaban later explained: "I don’t know why I hit him, but I disapproved of him, as I do of people lying on the banks of the Torrens and making love".

Tired and dirty, with blood on him and carrying injuries from those he had attacked, Balaban returned to the house above the café in Gouger Street in the early hours of Sunday morning, 12 April 1953. He went to the bathroom mirror to see the extent of his injuries. At that moment, he later attested, "I decided… to kill my wife because she was the cause of my condition and of me fighting that night". Balaban then grabbed a claw hammer and went to the main bedroom where he killed his wife by battering her about the head with the hammer. He then went to the other bedroom where Susan Ackland and the young child Phillip Cadd were sleeping. Balaban beat Ackland with the hammer. The boy sat up and cried out, and Balaban hit him as well, later saying "I thought it better that he die too". Balaban then went to the front-room sleep-out where 24-year-old café employee, Verna Manie, slept. Manie had woken with the noise and, without speaking, Balaban started hitting her on the head with the hammer. She put up her arms to try to protect her head. Suddenly he stopped and said: "I killed my wife. Do you want to see her?" Hearing a noise from another room, Balaban said, "Someone is still alive inside" and left the room. Manie latched the door and, desperate to escape, jumped from the window seventeen feet onto the footpath below. After he had left the sleep-out, Balaban attacked the victims again "so that they would die quickly".

Several young men in Brown Street, about a hundred yards from the Sunshine Café, heard a woman screaming for help. Shortly afterwards they saw Verna Manie fall from the window of the balcony sleep-out and crash to the footpath. The shop assistant was dressed in a nightgown, covered in blood and was in great pain. Police and an ambulance were called, with the police arriving after a few minutes. Balaban was briefly seen on the roof of the building next to the café. He had escaped through the bathroom window and walked across several roof-tops, before climbing down into Thomas Street, which was a cul-de-sac. Constable McLaren, who had arrived on the scene, went into Brown Street and saw Balaban running towards him from Thomas Street, wearing a grey coat over a singlet. McLaren flashed his torch and drew his revolver and apprehended him. Balaban's face was covered in blood; he had abrasions on his face and one eye was discoloured.

In the rooms above the café the police found Thelma Balaban dead on her double bed. In the other bedroom, Susan Ackland was found alive, but died in hospital later that day from a compound fracture of the skull. On another bed in the room was the boy, Phillip Cadd, lying unconscious from a fractured skull. He was taken to Adelaide Children's Hospital in a critical condition where he died eleven days later without recovering consciousness. Verna Manie was taken to hospital and treated for two depressed skull fractures and a fractured spine.

=== Trial, appeal and execution ===
In the hours after his apprehension and arrest for the murder of his wife, Balaban confessed to police he had murdered Zora Kusic in December 1952. During these early interviews he also gave details of the murder of Riva Kwas in Paris in 1948, prompting police to initiate enquiries with the French authorities. Balaban was charged with the murder of Kusic at Torrensville on 5 December 1952 and his wife's murder at the Gouger Street house on April 12. He was remanded in custody.

The trial for the murder of Zora Kusic began on 22 July 1953 at the Adelaide Criminal Court. Balaban pleaded not guilty to the charge. In his opening statement the Crown Prosecutor, Reginald Chamberlain Q.C., explained to the jury that the defendant had confessed to his crime in full detail and that "the only defence would be one of insanity". During the trial, testimony was given by the psychiatrist, Dr. H. Southwood, who claimed Balaban was suffering from a mental disorder "diagnosed as the paranoid form of schizophrenia". Southwood said he would be prepared to certify the defendant "as a mentally defective in the terms of the Mental Defectives Act". Southwood's testimony was challenged the next day when Dr. H. Birch, Superintendent of South Australian Government Mental Hospitals, gave evidence and characterised Balaban as a psychopathic personality who was not certifiable. Birch described the defendant as "one who was not insane, mentally disordered or deficient, but who on account of abnormality of personality or character had been unwilling or unable to conform to the ordinary standards of society". Dr. Birch added that, from all the evidence, "he had formed the opinion there was a sexual basis permeating a good deal of Balaban’s life, including the crimes". On July 29, the final day of the trial, the jury delivered a verdict of guilty after a short retirement. Asked if he wished to make a statement before he was sentenced, Balaban said: "I want to obey the law, and I think I am not guilty". The judge then passed a sentence of death by hanging.

Balaban's execution date was set for August 26. On 7 August 1953, an application was filed on behalf of Balaban in the Supreme Court of South Australia for leave to appeal against his conviction. The appeal was heard over six days by the Court of Criminal Appeal, consisting of the Full Bench of the South Australian Supreme Court. The Court's judgment was delivered on 17 August 1953, dismissing the appeal.

In the week before his execution, Balaban "savagely attacked a prison warden whom he tried to throttle". The prisoner was "quickly overpowered".

Ioan ('John') Balaban was hanged at the Adelaide Gaol at eight o’clock on the morning of 26 August 1953. The roads leading to the gaol were closed by police an hour before the execution and guards patrolled the gaol precincts in anticipation of demonstrations by opponents of capital punishment, but "the hanging failed to incite even one member of the public to demonstrate". The City Coroner conducted an inquest later that day, at which the press were permitted to attend, finding that Balaban's death was caused by "judicial hanging". His was the first execution to be carried out in the newly converted Hanging Tower at the Adelaide Gaol. Balaban was buried in the grounds of Adelaide Gaol (between the northern walls), in a plot in 'Murderers' Row' that had been dug in readiness earlier in the week.

== Victims ==
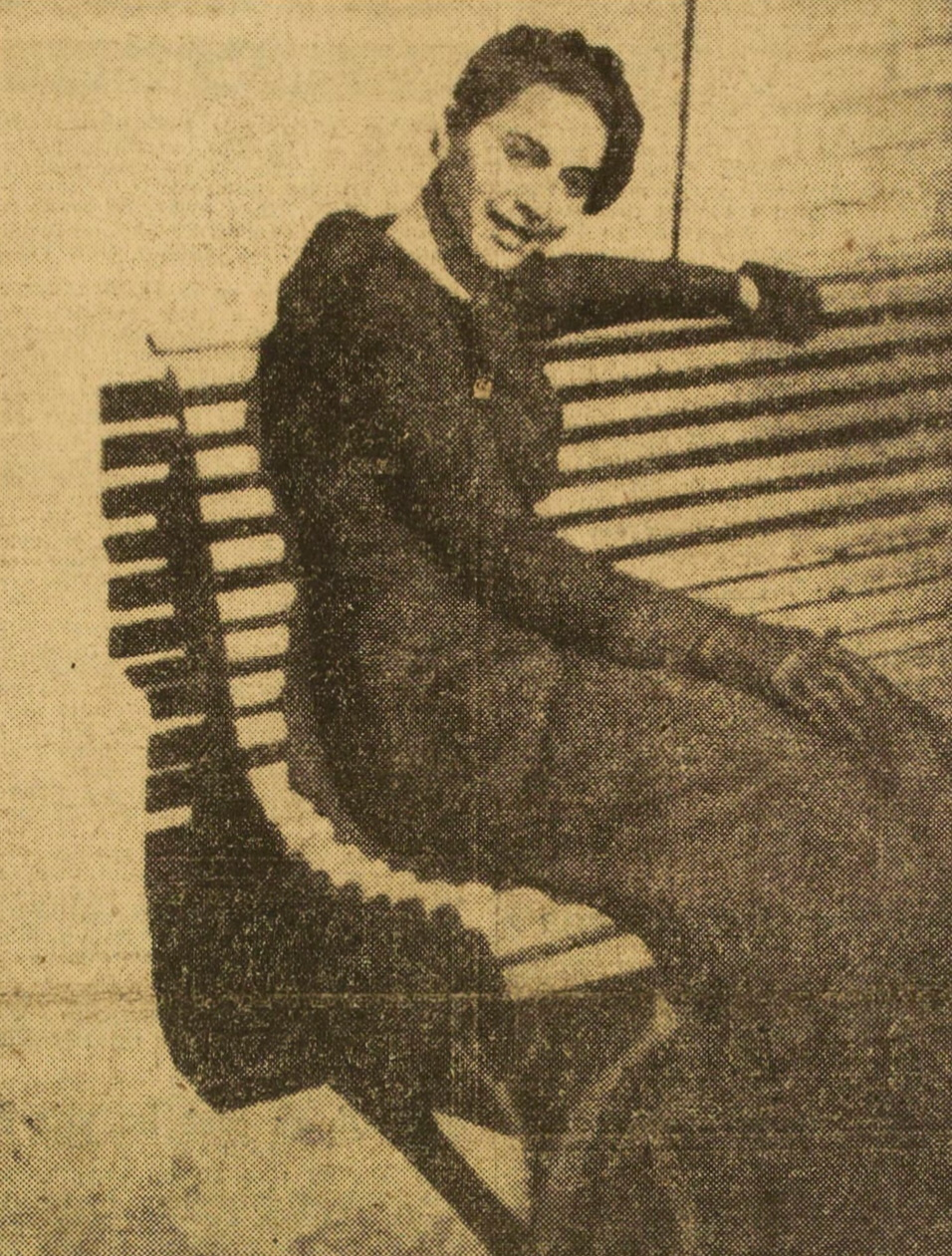
Riva Kwas, the first victim of serial killer John (Ioan) Balaban.

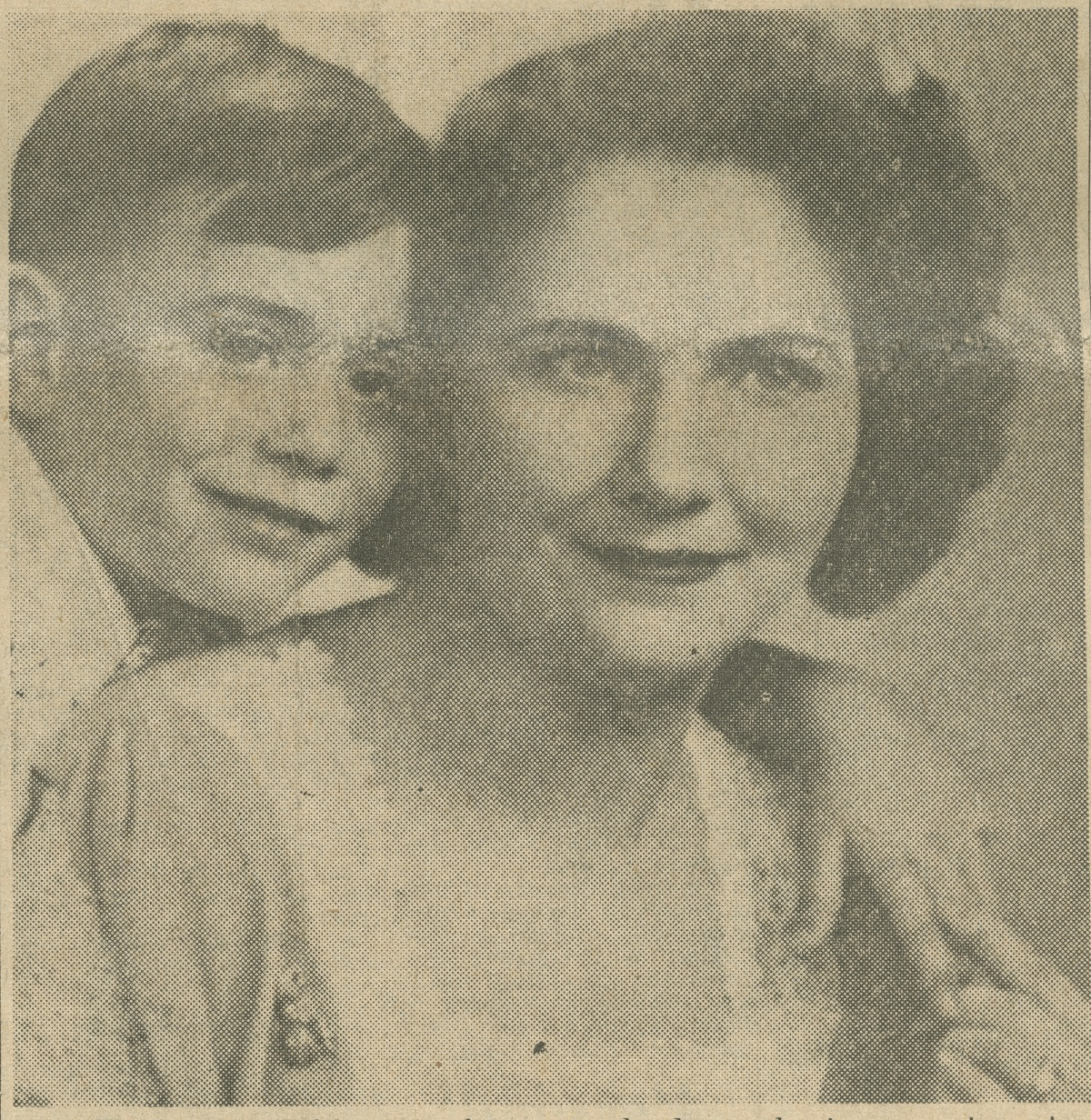
Thelma Balaban and her son Phillip, murdered by John Balaban in April 1953 in Adelaide.

- Riva Kwas was born in 1916 in Poland. In February 1948 she was working in Paris as a chemist and living in a studio-apartment in the Auteuil district of Paris, near the Porte de Saint-Cloud. Riva was murdered by Balaban on 22 February 1948 (or the early hours of the following morning).
- Zora Kusic was born in Yugoslavia in about 1923. She migrated to Australia in about 1948 and resided in Kimba at the top of Eyre Peninsula, South Australia. In about August 1952, she moved to Adelaide and lived in a shack at the rear of a boarding-house in North Parade, Torrensville. She was murdered by Balaban in her room in the early evening of 5 December 1952.
- Thelma Joyce Balaban, who was born on 2 April 1923 at Kensington, South Australia, was the daughter of Arthur and Susan Ackland. In May 1942, Thelma married Bruce Cadd (a returned A.I.F. Driver from Scarborough, Western Australia) in Norwood, South Australia; in 1945 Bruce and Thelma Cadd were living in George Street, Norwood; Their son, Phillip, was born in October 1946. By 1950, the family was on Fisher Street, in Fullarton. The couple divorced in May 1950, with a decree nisi granted against Bruce Cadd for "habitual cruelty." Thelma, by now the proprietor of the Sunshine Snack Shop on Gouger Street in Adelaide, married John Balaban on 27 September 1952 in Norwood. She was murdered by Balaban in the early hours of Sunday, 12 April 1953.
- Susan Jane Ackland, born in 1887 at Dandenong, Victoria, was the third of seven children of George and Susan Payne. She married Arthur Ackland in May 1914 in Kensington, South Australia. Her only child, Thelma, was born in April 1923. Susan's husband, Arthur Ackland, died in 1937. On 12 April 1953, John Balaban attacked Susan Ackland with a hammer as she slept with her grandchild, Phillip Cadd; she died in hospital later that day.
- Phillip Vincent Cadd was born on 30 October 1946 in Adelaide. Six-year-old Cadd was critically injured by Balaban in the early hours of 12 April 1953. He died at the Adelaide Children's Hospital on 23 April 1953.

== See also ==
- List of serial killers by country
