= Daniel Mărgărit =

Romanian footballer

Personal information
- Full name: Daniel Dumitru Mărgărit
- Date of birth: 30 August 1996 (age 30)
- Place of birth: Târgu Jiu, Romania
- Position: Forward

Youth career
- –2014: Pandurii Târgu Jiu

Senior career*
Years	Team	Apps	(Gls)
2014–2016	Pandurii II Târgu Jiu	5	(1)
2015–2017	Pandurii Târgu Jiu	3	(0)
2016	→ ASU Politehnica (loan)	13	(1)
2017	Șirineasa	12	(2)
2018	Național Sebiș	24	(3)
2019	Filiași		
2019	Unirea Alba Iulia	14	(2)
2020	Vedița Colonești		
2021	Filiași	6	(3)
- * Club domestic league appearances and goals as of 30 April 2021

Daniel Mărgărit (born 30 August 1996) is a Romanian professional footballer who plays as a forward.
