= Gábor Vida (writer) =

Hungarian writer (born 1968)

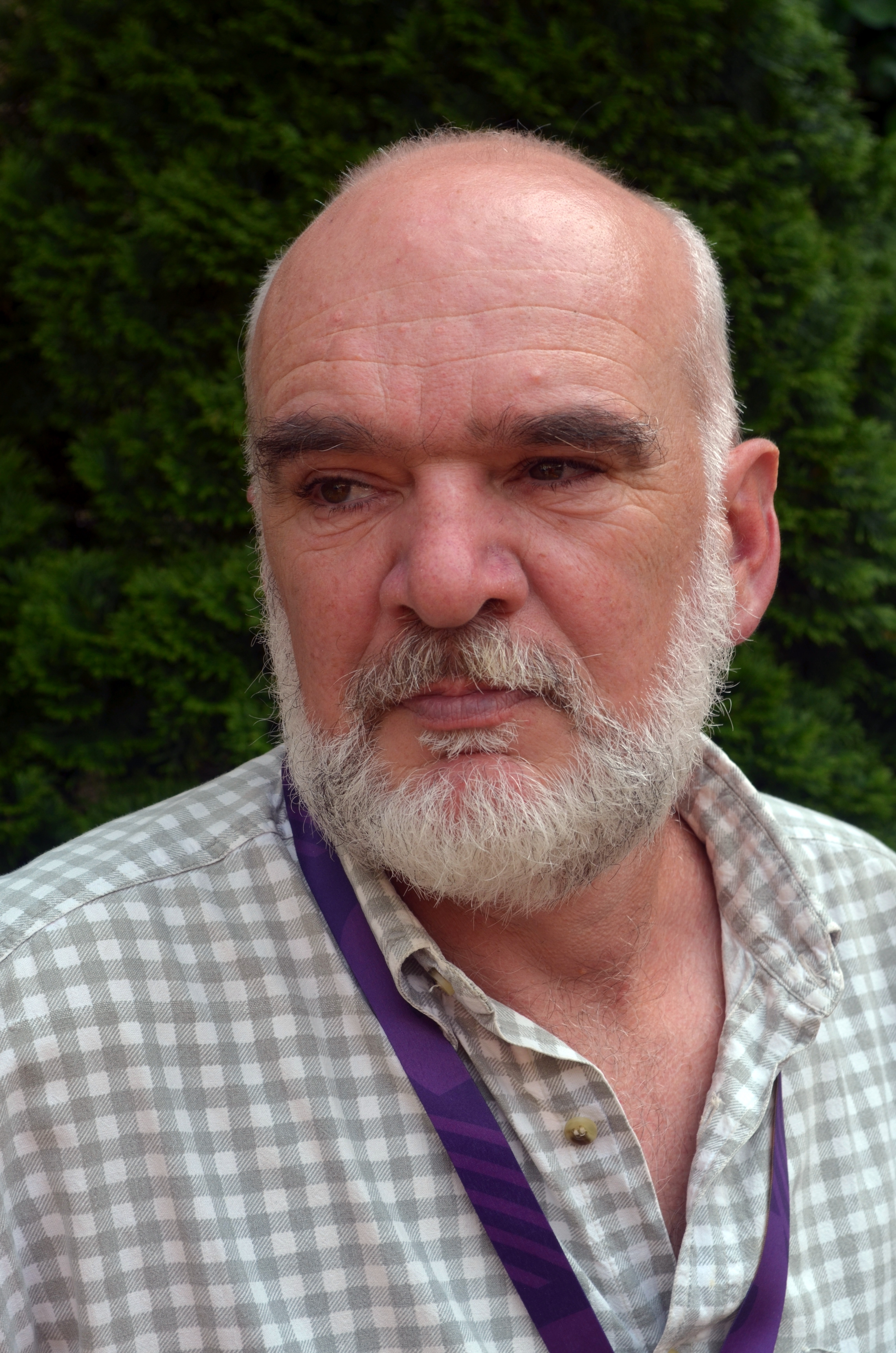
- Gábor Vida in 2023
- Born: 4 March 1968 (age 58); Chișineu-Criș, Romania
- Education: Babeș-Bolyai University
- Occupations: Writer; editor
- Writing career
- Period: 1994–present
- Notable works: Egy dadogás története (2017); Senkiháza (2023)

Gábor Vida (born 4 March 1968) is an ethnic Hungarian writer and editor from Romania.

== Biography ==
Gábor Vida was born in Chișineu-Criș on 4 March 1968. After completing his high school studies in Arad, he studied Hungarian and French at the Babeș-Bolyai University in Cluj-Napoca, graduating in 1994. He joined the editorial board of the literary journal Látó as a staff member in 1994 and became an editor of the journal's prose section in 1996. His first volume, a short story collection titled Búcsú a filmtől ("Farewell to the Film"), was published in 1994.

In 1998, Vida published an essay in Látó with the title "How should we write the history of Hungarian literature in Romania?", sparking a significant literary debate credited with "dismantl[ing] generational literary ideals and illusions".

In 2017, he earned greater recognition with his autofictional novel Egy dadogás története ("The Story of a Stammer"). It was ranked third on the list of 2017's best books by Könyvesblog. The book received the Merítés Prize for prose, winning both the jury award and the popular vote. In 2021, it was voted the best Hungarian volume of poetry of the 2010s by the professional jury of the prize. In 2022, the volume was also published in English under the title Story of a Stammer, translated by Jozefina Komporaly.

In June 2019, he was appointed editor-in-chief of Látó, succeeding poet András Ferenc Kovács in the position.

== Writing ==
Vida considers himself a writer of traditional, plot-focused prose, and has distanced himself from the postmodern approach to writing. In a 2005 interview, he stated, "I think I have escaped from text-centred literature. I have always wanted to write traditional prose, in simple terms: I like telling stories." His early prose was described as pertaining to late modernism.

When asked about his literary influences, he mentioned Mór Jókai, Kálmán Mikszáth, Gyula Krúdy, Zsigmond Móricz, Zsigmond Kemény, Béla Hamvas, Plato, Fyodor Dostoevsky, and Jack London. His literary mindset was compared to that of Ádám Bodor and István Szilágyi.

== Personal life ==
As of 2023, Vida is living in Târgu Mureș. He is married to editor and ethnographer Erika Vida (born 1970).

== Works ==
- Búcsú a filmtől [Farewell to the Film] (in Hungarian). Târgu Mureș: Mentor. 1994. ISBN 9739665012.
- Fakusz három magányossága [The Three Solitudes of Fakusz] (in Hungarian). Budapest: Magvető. 2005. ISBN 9631424316.
- Nem szabad és nem királyi [Neither Free Nor Royal] (in Hungarian). Budapest: Magvető. 2007. ISBN 9789631426014.
- A kétely meg a hiába [Doubt and Futility] (in Hungarian). Budapest: Magvető. 2012. ISBN 9789631429985.
- Ahol az ő lelke [Where Their Soul] (in Hungarian). Budapest: Magvető. 2013. ISBN 9789631431247.
- Egy dadogás története [The Story of a Stammer] (in Hungarian). Budapest: Magvető. 2017. ISBN 9789631435726.
  - Story of a Stammer. Translated by Jozefina Komporaly. London: Seagull Books. 2022. ISBN 9780857429858.
- Senkiháza: Erdélyi lektűr [No Man's Land: Transylvanian Popular Fiction] (in Hungarian). Budapest: Magvető. 2023. ISBN 9789631442762.

== Awards and honours ==
- János Arany Prize (2005)
- Tibor Déry Prize (2007)
