= Vlad Muțiu =

Romanian footballer

Personal information
- Full name: Vlad Ionuț Muțiu
- Date of birth: 2 February 1995 (age 31)
- Place of birth: Baia Mare, Romania
- Height: 1.87 m (6 ft 2 in)
- Position: Goalkeeper

Team information
- Current team: CSM Olimpia Satu Mare
- Number: 31

Youth career
- –2008: FC Baia Mare
- 2008–2014: Dinamo București

Senior career*
Years	Team	Apps	(Gls)
2012–2015	Dinamo II București	16	(0)
2015–2019	Dinamo București	11	(0)
2015	→ Unirea Tărlungeni (loan)	15	(0)
2016	→ CSM Râmnicu Vâlcea (loan)	9	(0)
2017	→ Afumați (loan)	12	(0)
2019–2020	Farul Constanța	23	(0)
2020–2021	Universitatea Cluj	20	(0)
2021–2026	Hermannstadt	26	(0)
2026–	CSM Olimpia Satu Mare	10	(0)

International career
2014	Romania U19	2	(0)
- * Club domestic league appearances and goals as of 31 October 2026

Vlad Ionuț Muțiu (born 2 February 1995) is a Romanian professional footballer who plays as a goalkeeper for Liga II club CSM Olimpia Satu Mare.

== Honours ==
Dinamo București

- Cupa României runner-up: 2015–16

Hermannstadt

- Cupa României runner-up: 2024–25
