= Ionuț Burnea =

Romanian footballer

Personal information
- Full name: Ionuț Georgian Burnea
- Date of birth: 12 August 1992 (age 34)
- Place of birth: Câmpulung, Romania
- Height: 1.81 m (5 ft 11 in)
- Position: Defender

Youth career
- Sporting Pitești
- Muscelul Câmpulung
- –2010: Dinamo București

Senior career*
| Years | Team | Apps | (Gls) |
| 2010–2013 | Dinamo II București | 53 | (0) |
| 2013–2014 | CSL Ștefănești | | |
| 2014 | FC Costuleni | 5 | (0) |
| 2014 | Muscelul Câmpulung | | |
| 2015–2016 | Concordia II Chiajna | | |
| 2016 | CSL Ștefănești | | |
| 2016 | Unirea Tărlungeni | 13 | (0) |
| 2017–2024 | Mioveni | 155 | (8) |
| 2024–2025 | CSM Slatina | 8 | (1) |
| 2025–2026 | AFC Câmpulung Muscel | 8 | (0) |

International career
| 2012 | Romania U21 | 1 | (0) |
- * Club domestic league appearances and goals as of 22 November 2025

Ionuț Georgian Burnea (born 12 August 1992) is a Romanian professional footballer who plays as a defender.
