= George Pirtea =

Romanian footballer

Personal information
- Full name: George Marian Pirtea
- Date of birth: 24 July 1996 (age 30)
- Place of birth: Chișineu-Criș, Romania
- Height: 1.74 m (5 ft 9 in)
- Position: Midfielder

Team information
- Current team: ACS Socodor
- Number: 10

Youth career
- 2006–2013: Liberty Salonta

Senior career*
Years	Team	Apps	(Gls)
2013–2014	Gloria Arad		
2014–2016	Șoimii Pâncota	32	(7)
2016	Pandurii Târgu Jiu	2	(0)
2017	Național Sebiș		
2017–2018	Mioveni	17	(1)
2018–	ACS Socodor		
- * Club domestic league appearances and goals as of 27 June 2018

George Marian Pirtea (born 24 July 1996) is a Romanian professional footballer who plays as a midfielder for Liga IV side ACS Socodor.
