= Daniel Mutu =

Romanian footballer

Personal information
- Full name: Daniel Mutu
- Date of birth: 11 September 1987 (age 39)
- Place of birth: Arad, Romania
- Height: 1.85 m (6 ft 1 in)
- Position: Goalkeeper

Team information
- Current team: FC Brașov
- Number: 13

Youth career
- 1997–2004: ACU Arad

Senior career*
Years	Team	Apps	(Gls)
2004–2005	ACU Arad	10	(0)
2005–2009	CFR Timișoara	53	(0)
2009	Internațional	0	(0)
2009	AS Săgeata Stejaru	1	(0)
2010–2011	Pandurii Târgu Jiu	0	(0)
2011	Politehnica Iași	0	(0)
2012–2016	Brașov	37	(0)
2016–2017	Sepsi OSK	1	(0)
2017–2018	SR Brașov	20	(0)
2018–2020	Olimpic Cetate Râșnov	42	(0)
2020–2021	Corona Brașov	14	(0)
2021–2023	FC Brașov	5	(0)
2023–	Ciucaș Tărlungeni	0	(0)
- * Club domestic league appearances and goals as of 1 June 2023

Daniel Mutu (born 11 September 1987) is a Romanian footballer who plays for Liga II club FC Brașov.

== Honours ==
Corona Brașov

- Liga III: 2020–21
- Liga IV: 2019–20
