= Vasile Petra =

Romanian footballer

Personal information
- Full name: Vasile Mihai Petra
- Date of birth: 12 January 1994 (age 32)
- Place of birth: Reghin, Romania
- Height: 1.77 m (5 ft 10 in)
- Positions: Midfielder; forward

Team information
- Current team: Metalul Buzău
- Number: 6

Youth career
- Avântul Reghin

Senior career*
Years	Team	Apps	(Gls)
2014–2016	Unirea Tărlungeni	34	(6)
2015	→ Avântul Reghin (loan)	8	(1)
2016–2017	ASA Târgu Mureș	26	(1)
2016	→ FC Brașov (loan)	0	(0)
2018	UTA Arad	26	(1)
2019	CSM Târgu Mureș	7	(11)
2019–2020	Ceahlăul Piatra Neamț	16	(7)
2020–2021	SCM Zalău	14	(5)
2021–2022	Odorheiu Secuiesc	21	(8)
2022–2024	Unirea Ungheni	15	(2)
2023–2024	→ Ceahlăul Piatra Neamț (loan)	11	(0)
2024	Mediaș	10	(1)
2024–	Metalul Buzău	4	(0)
- * Club domestic league appearances and goals as of 28 September 2024

Vasile Mihai Petra (born 12 January 1994) is a Romanian professional footballer who plays as a midfielder for Liga II club Metalul Buzău.

== Honours ==
CSM Târgu Mureș

- Liga IV – Mureș County: 2018–19

Odorheiu Secuiesc

- Liga III: 2021–22
