= Robert Moglan =

Romanian footballer

Personal information
- Date of birth: 5 July 1996 (age 30)
- Place of birth: Galați, Romania
- Height: 1.87 m (6 ft 2 in)
- Position: Defender

Youth career
- Oțelul Galați

Senior career*
Years	Team	Apps	(Gls)
2012–2014	Oțelul II Galați	?	(?)
2014–2016	Oțelul Galați	1	(0)
2016–2017	Afumați	0	(0)
2017	Dacia Unirea Brăila	14	(0)
2018–2021	Oțelul Galați	15	(0)

International career
2013	Romania U-17	3	(0)
- * Club domestic league appearances and goals

Robert Moglan (born 5 July 1996) is a Romanian former professional footballer who played as a defender.
