= Alon Netzer =

Israeli footballer

Personal information
- Date of birth: 2 June 1993 (age 33)
- Place of birth: Herzliya, Israel
- Height: 1.90 m (6 ft 3 in)
- Position: Central defender

Senior career*
| Years | Team | Apps | (Gls) |
| 2012–2016 | Hapoel Ramat HaSharon | 54 | (0) |
| 2016 | ASA Târgu Mureș | 6 | (0) |
| 2017 | Derry City | 0 | (0) |
| 2017–2018 | FK Trakai | 16 | (0) |
| 2018–2019 | Hapoel Nazareth Ilit | 36 | (2) |
| 2019 | Academica Clinceni | 1 | (0) |
| 2020 | Chaiyaphum United | 1 | (0) |
- * Club domestic league appearances and goals

Alon Netzer (Hebrew: אלון נצר; born 2 June 1993) is an Israeli footballer who plays as a defender. His grandparents from his father side were born in Romania, but moved to Israel in 1948, because of that he holds Romanian citizenship. In 2016 he went with fellow Israeli player, Yuval Jakobovich to play in Romania for Liga I club ASA Târgu Mureș.
