= Alin Predescu =

Romanian association football player

Personal information
- Full name: Alin Andrei Predescu
- Date of birth: 18 November 1995 (age 30)
- Place of birth: Bucharest, Romania
- Height: 1.72 m (5 ft 8 in)
- Position: Midfielder

Youth career
- Steaua București
- Grasshopper
- Pandurii Târgu Jiu

Senior career*
Years	Team	Apps	(Gls)
2014–2015	Pandurii Târgu Jiu	0	(0)
2015–2016	Gaz Metan Mediaș	0	(0)
2016–2017	Luceafărul Oradea	4	(0)
2017–2019	Steaua București	28	(38)
- * Club domestic league appearances and goals as of 14 July 2019

Alin Andrei Predescu (born 18 November 1995) is a Romanian professional footballer who plays as a midfielder.
