= List of settlements in Ilfov County =

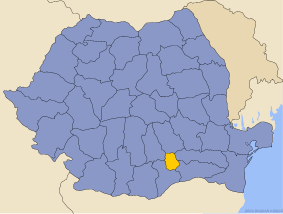
Ilfov County in Romania

This is a list of settlements in Ilfov County, Romania.

The following are the county's towns, along with their attached villages:

Town	Villages
Bragadiru	
Buftea	Buciumeni
Chitila	Rudeni
Măgurele	Alunișu, Dumitrana, Pruni, Vârteju
Otopeni	Odăile
Pantelimon	
Popești-Leordeni	
Voluntari	

The following are the county's communes, with component villages:

Commune	Villages
1 Decembrie	1 Decembrie
Afumați	Afumați
Balotești	Balotești, Dumbrăveni, Săftica
Berceni	Berceni
Brănești	Brănești, Islaz, Pasărea, Vadu Anei
Cernica	Bălăceanca, Căldăraru, Cernica, Poșta, Tânganu
Chiajna	Chiajna, Dudu, Roșu
Ciolpani	Ciolpani, Izvorani, Lupăria, Piscu
Ciorogârla	Ciorogârla, Dârvari
Clinceni	Clinceni, Olteni, Ordoreanu
Copăceni	Copăceni
Corbeanca	Corbeanca, Ostratu, Petrești, Tamași
Cornetu	Buda, Cornetu
Dascălu	Creața, Dascălu, Gagu, Runcu
Dărăști-Ilfov	Dărăști-Ilfov
Dobroești	Dobroești, Fundeni
Domnești	Domnești, Țegheș
Dragomirești-Vale	Dragomirești-Deal, Dragomirești-Vale, Zurbaua
Găneasa	Cozieni, Găneasa, Moara Domnească, Piteasca, Șindrilița
Glina	Cățelu, Glina, Manolache
Grădiștea	Grădiștea, Sitaru
Gruiu	Gruiu, Lipia, Siliștea Snagovului, Șanțu-Florești
Jilava	Jilava
Moara Vlăsiei	Căciulați, Moara Vlăsiei
Mogoșoaia	Mogoșoaia
Nuci	Balta Neagră, Merii Petchii, Micșuneștii Mari, Micșuneștii-Moară, Nuci
Periș	Bălteni, Buriaș, Periș
Petrăchioaia	Măineasca, Petrăchioaia, Surlari, Vânători
Snagov	Ciofliceni, Ghermănești, Snagov, Tâncăbești, Vlădiceasca
Ștefăneștii de Jos	Crețuleasca, Ștefăneștii de Jos, Ștefăneștii de Sus
Tunari	Dimieni, Tunari
Vidra	Crețești, Sintești, Vidra
