= Fundeni, Călărași =

Fundeni
- Commune
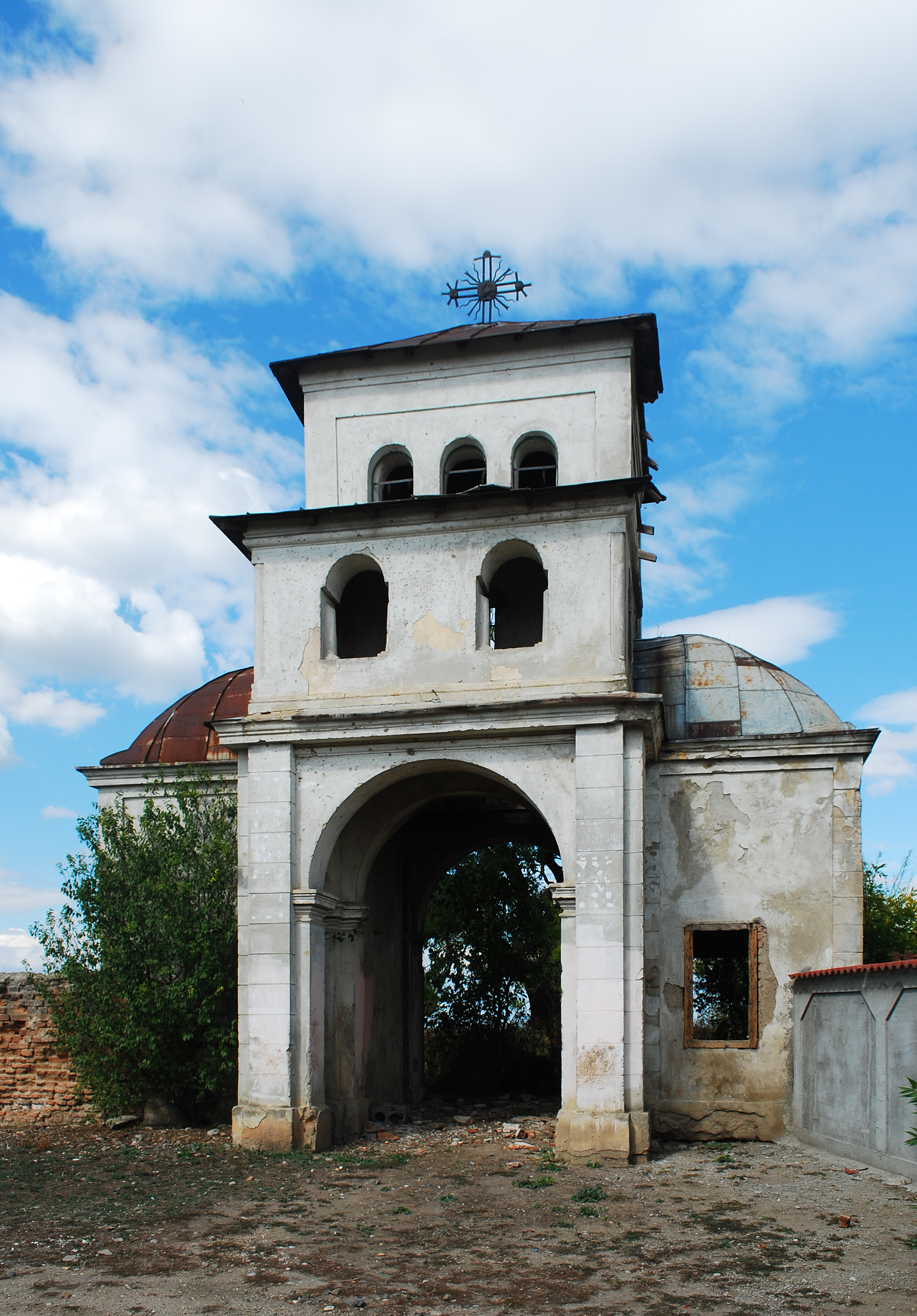
- Former bell tower of Saint Andrew Church in Fundeni

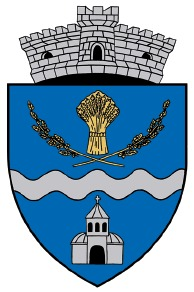
- Coat of arms

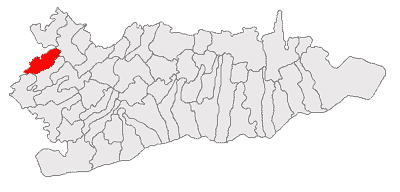
- Location in Călărași County

- Location in Romania
- Coordinates: 44°23′N 26°22′E
- Country: Romania
- County: Călărași

Government
  - Mayor (2024–2028): Gheorghiță Cărtușanu (PSD)
- Area: 58.63 km^{2} (22.64 sq mi)
- Elevation: 54 m (177 ft)
- Population (2021-12-01): 5,568
  - Density: 94.97/km^{2} (246.0/sq mi)
- Time zone: UTC+02:00 (EET)
  - Summer (DST): UTC+03:00 (EEST)
- Postal code: 917110
- Area code: +(40) 242
- Vehicle reg.: CL
- Website: primariafundeni.ro

Fundeni is a commune in Călărași County, Muntenia, Romania. It is composed of a single village, Fundeni. As of the 2021 census, the population of Fundeni was 5,568.

The commune is located in the northwestern part of the county, on the border with Ilfov County. It lies 46 km (29 mi) north of Oltenița, 99 km (62 mi) west of the county seat, Călărași, and 23 km (14 mi) east of downtown Bucharest.

Fundeni lies on the left bank of the Dâmbovița River. The river Pasărea passes through the commune, forming Lake Fundeni, before discharging into the Dâmbovița just south of Fundeni.

The commune is crossed by the county road DJ301, which connects it to the south to Plătărești, Gălbinași, Vasilați, and Budești (where it ends in national road DN4), and to the north to Cernica and Pantelimon in Ilfov County (where it ends in DN3). In the center of Fundeni, county road DJ100 branches off DJ301, leading north to Brănești, Ilfov (where it intersects with DN3), Găneasa, Afumați (where it intersects with DN2), Ștefăneștii de Jos, Tunari, and Otopeni (where it ends in DN1). The train stop Funzănești, located near the intersection of DJ301 and DJ100, serves the CFR Line 801, which connects Bucharest (Obor) to Oltenița.

Historical population
Year	Pop.	±%
2002	5,521	—
2011	5,658	+2.5%
2021	5,568	−1.6%
Source: Census data
