= Șindrilița =

- Location within Romania

Location
- Country: Romania
- Counties: Ilfov County
- Villages: Șindrilița, Piteasca

Physical characteristics
- Mouth: Pasărea
  - location: Pasărea
  - coordinates: 44.4743°N 26.3095°E
- Length: 12 km (7.5 mi)
- Basin size: 59 km^{2} (23 sq mi)

Basin features
- Progression: Pasărea→ Dâmbovița→ Argeș→ Danube→ Black Sea

The Șindrilița is a left tributary of the river Pasărea in Romania. It flows into the Pasărea in the village Pasărea. Its length is 12 km (7.5 mi) and its basin size is 59 km^{2} (23 sq mi).
