= Stadionul Cătălin Hîldan =

Romanian stadium

Coordinates: 44.46418°N 26.33276°E

- Interactive map of Stadionul Cătălin Hîldan
- Location: Brănești, Romania
- Owner: CS Brănești
- Capacity: 2,500
- Surface: Grass

Tenant
- CS Brănești

Cătălin Hîldan Stadium is a multi-use stadium in Brănești, Ilfov County, Romania. It is the home ground of CS Brănești and holds 2,500 people.

The stadium is named after Cătălin Hîldan, the former Dinamo Bucharest player who died on the field during a game.
