= Codrii Vlăsiei =

Forest that once covered parts of Romania

Codrii Vlăsiei was an old-growth forest that once covered parts of southern Romania, including the territory of today's Bucharest and the surrounding Ilfov County.

The thick forests were used by Romanians as a retreat during the age of migrations because they were not easy to cross on horseback. In fact, the name of the forest means "the Forests of Wallachia". Codrii means "forests" in the Romanian language, while Vlăsiei is the genitive form of Vlăsia, the Slavic denomination for Wallachia.

The thick forest was also useful in the Middle Ages, being used by several voivods to defeat other armies. In 1456, Vlad Țepeș defeated his rival Vladislav Dan at Târgșor at the edge of Codrii Vlăsiei. This was also the place where Vlad defeated the Ottoman army that came to depose him. It is also thought that Vlad was assassinated there following a plot of the boyars. The forests were later a hideout for highwaymen, haiducs and other outlaws.

Between 1692 and 1700, a paved road which linked the centre of Bucharest to the Mogoșoaia Palace of Constantin Brâncoveanu was built through the forest. Named Podul Mogoșoaiei, it was made of oak wood. Most roads in the Balkans at that time became muddy in the spring and autumn, and the wood prevented this. Consequently, the road was one of the most important construction works of the area and a source of pride to Bucharesters. In 1842 the road was paved with cobblestone. It was later upgraded to asphalt. The road was renamed Calea Victoriei after the Romanian victory in the Independence War of 1877–1878.

Most of the forest was intact until the 19th century, when commerce involving cereals and wood began to develop in Wallachia and the forest was razed for the land to be used in agriculture. Of the old forests only a few small areas remain, mostly north of Bucharest, in localities such as Snagov, Pustnicu, Cernica, Romanești and Comana. The surface of forests is currently just about 3,500 ha (8,600 acres). Băneasa Forest, situated in the north of Bucharest, is in danger to be transformed in a park.

The slicing of forest estates as a result of restitution of forestland to the pre-World War II owners creates major difficulties in the management of forests from the area, which imposes new rules in the unitary management of forests as well.
