= Pantelimon, Ilfov =

Pantelimon
- Town
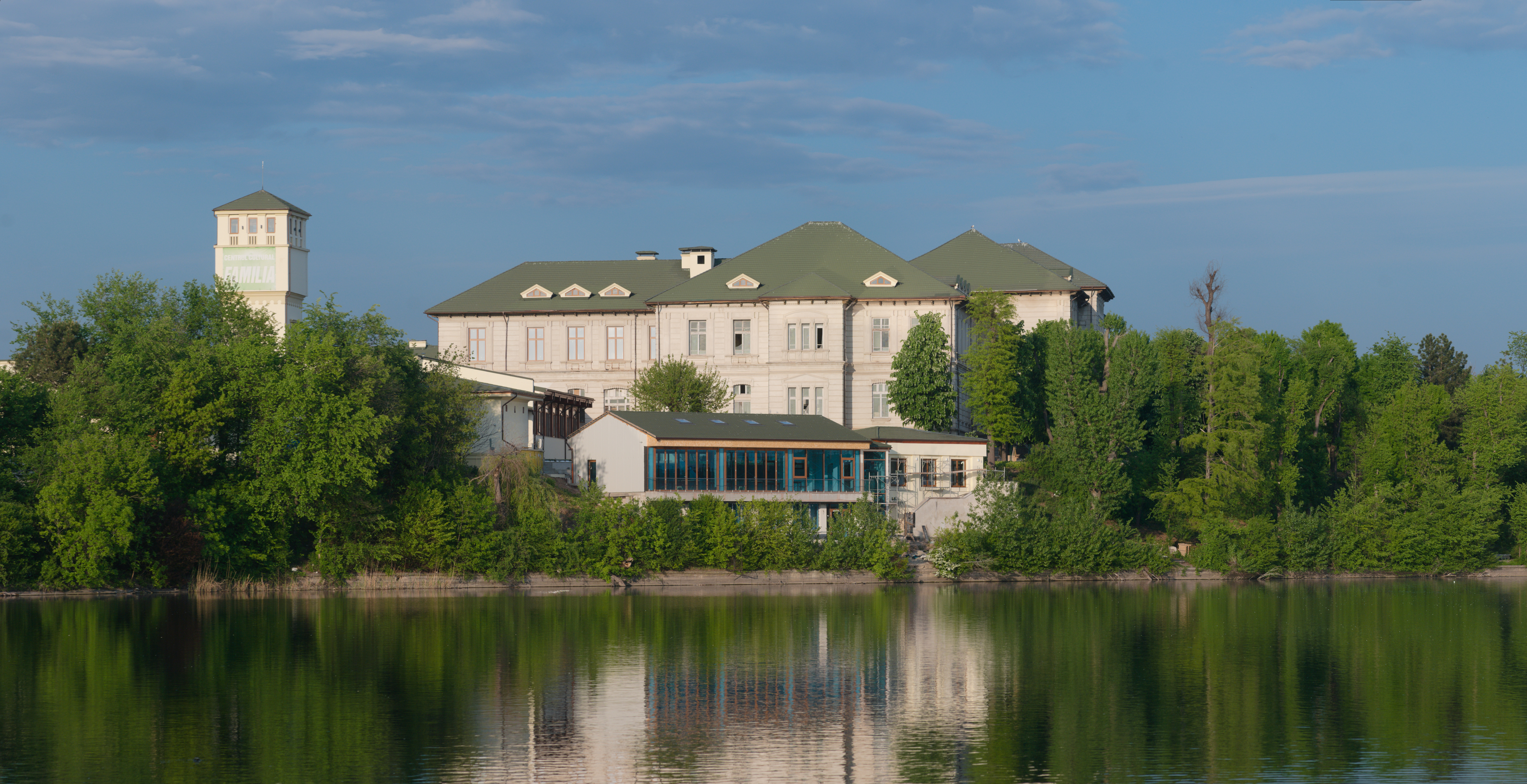
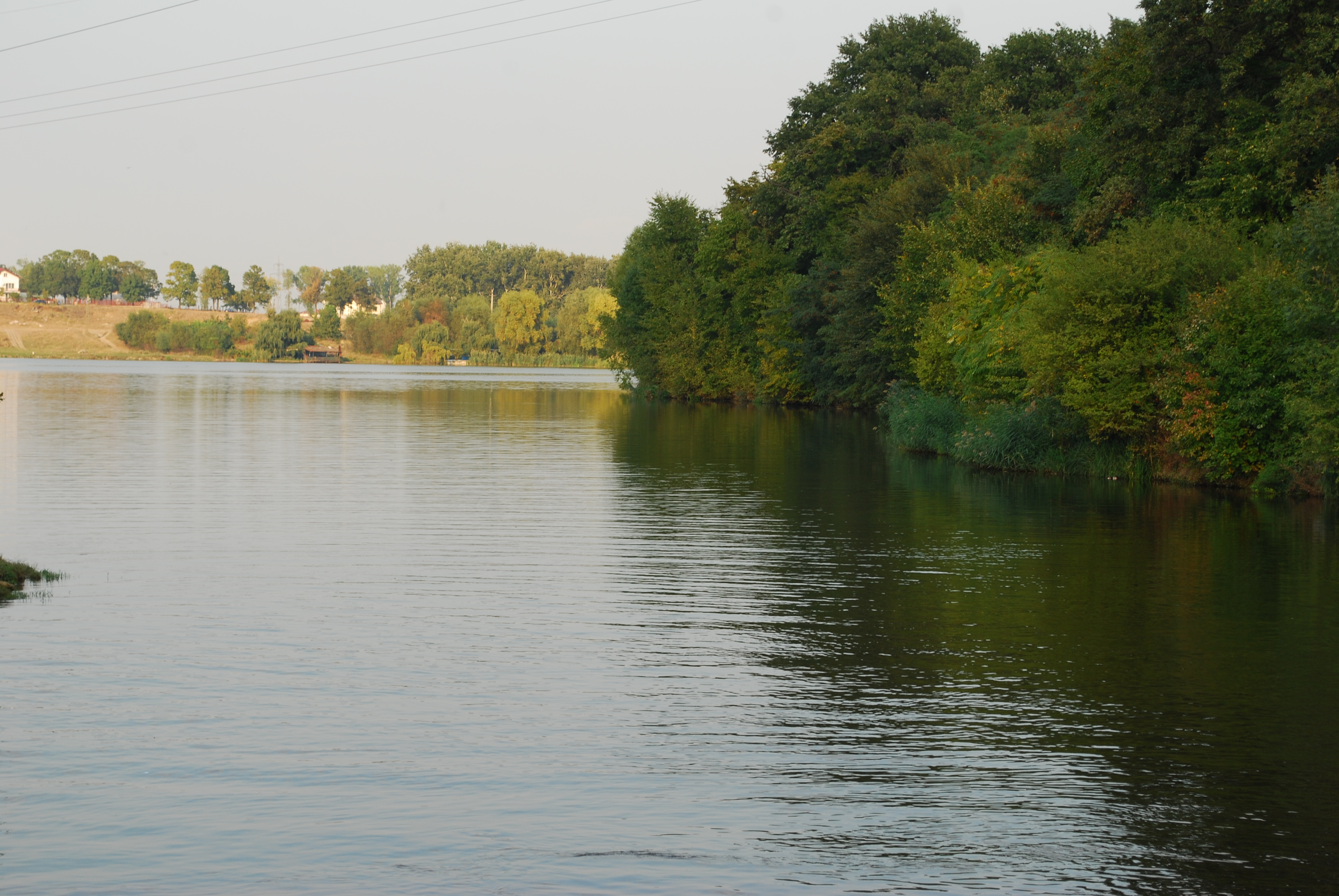
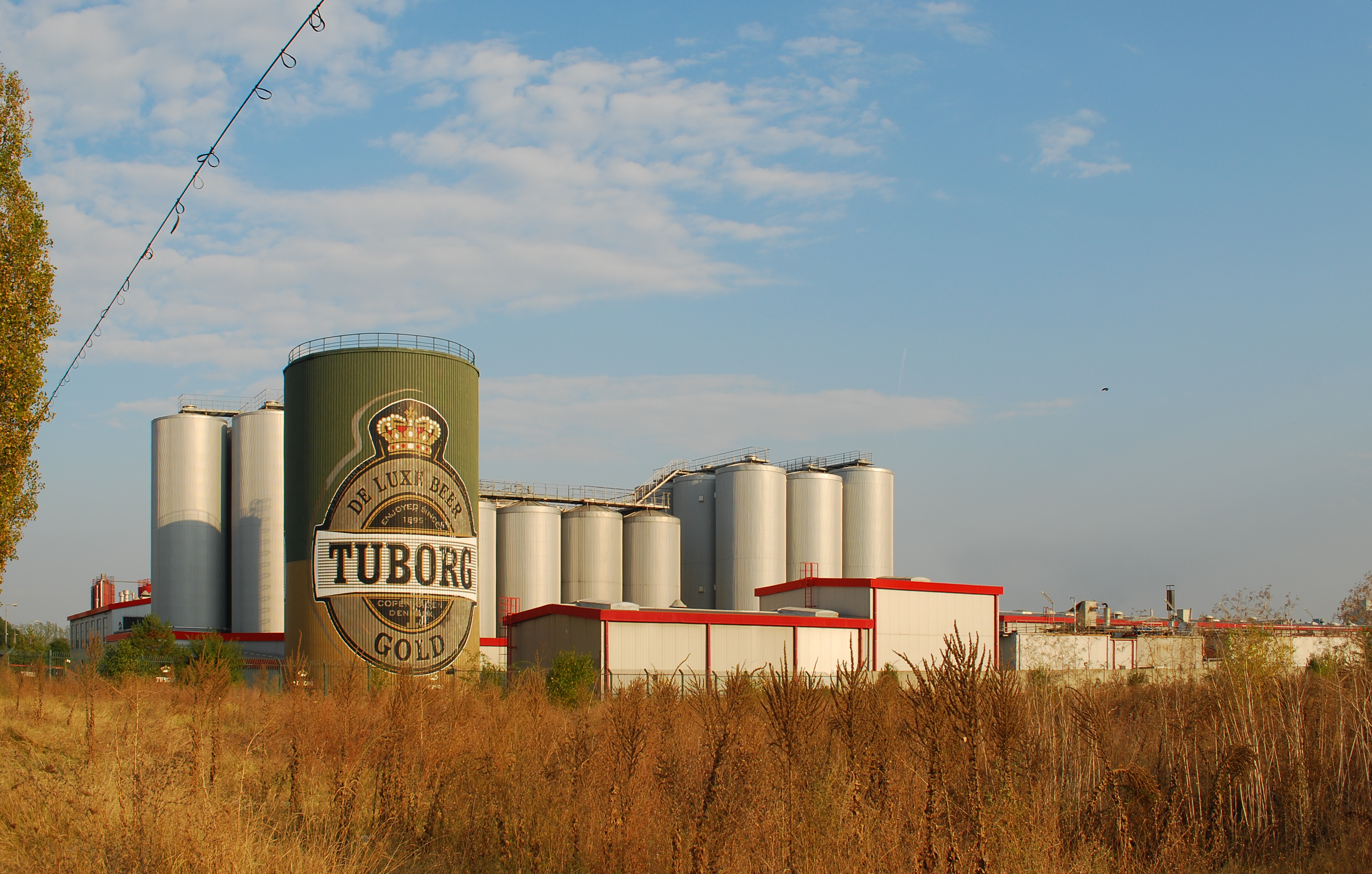
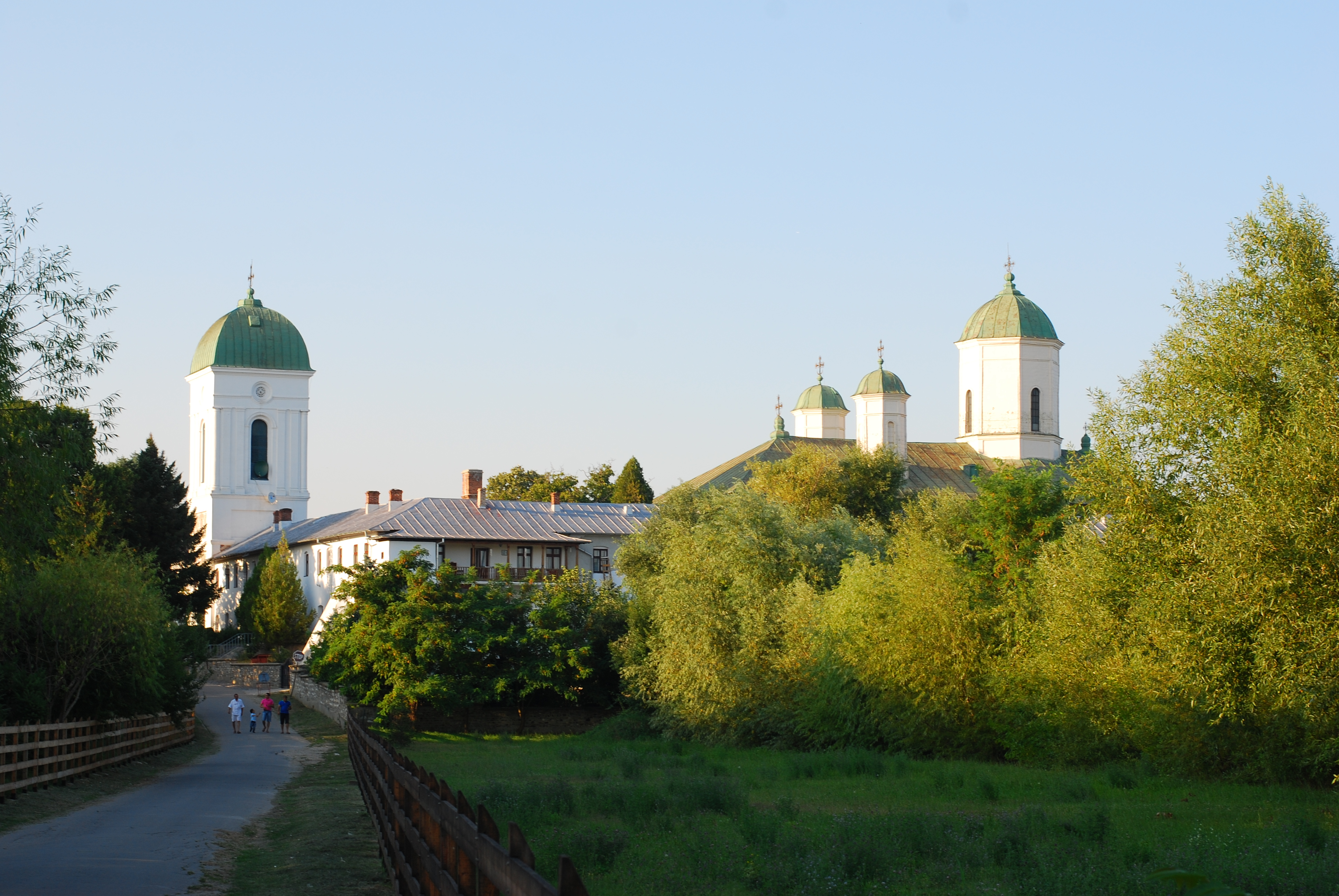
- The island and the former monastery of Saint Pantelimon Lake Cernica Brewery in Pantelimon Cernica Monastery

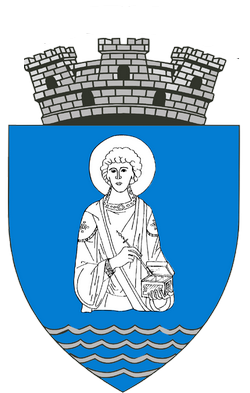
- Seal

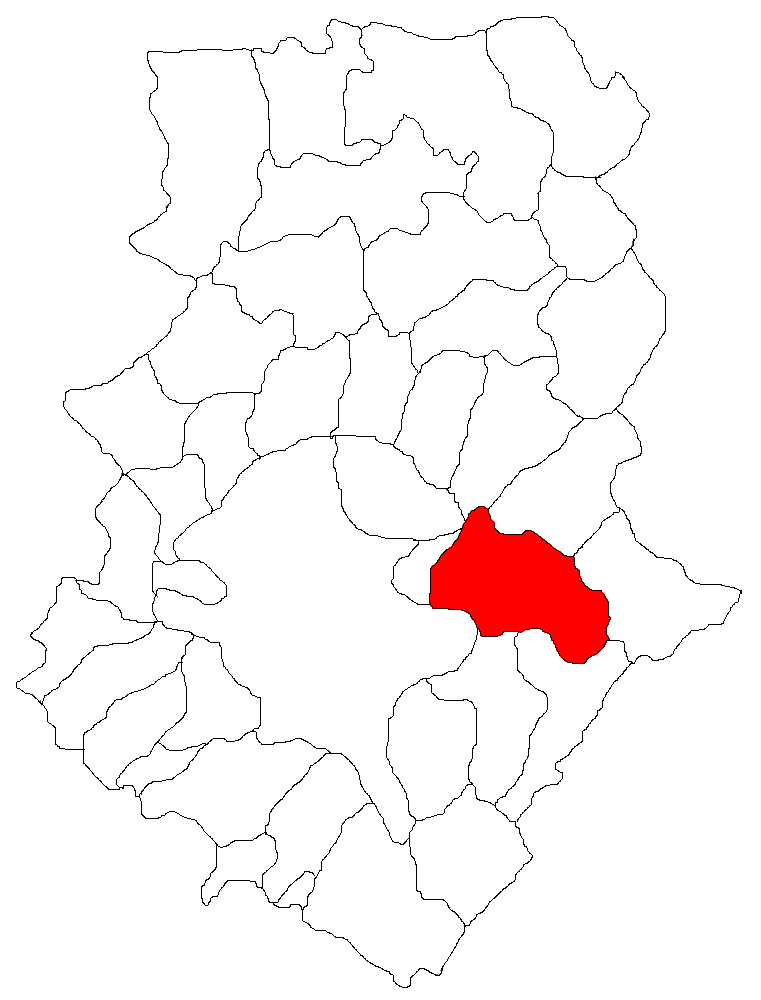
- Location in Ilfov County

- Location in Romania
- Coordinates: 44°27′N 26°12′E
- Country: Romania
- County: Ilfov

Government
  - Mayor (2024–2028): Marian Ivan
- Area: 69 km^{2} (27 sq mi)
- Elevation: 73 m (240 ft)
- Population (2021-12-01): 32,873
  - Density: 480/km^{2} (1,200/sq mi)
- Time zone: UTC+02:00 (EET)
  - Summer (DST): UTC+03:00 (EEST)
- Postal code: 077145
- Area code: +(40) 21
- Vehicle reg.: IF
- Website: www.primariapantelimon.ro

Pantelimon (Romanian pronunciation: [panteliˈmon]) is a town in Ilfov County, Muntenia, Romania. The town — bordered to the west by the Romanian capital, Bucharest — has an area of 69 km^{2} (27 sq mi). Its name is derived from the Greek saint Panteleimon.

== Geography ==
The town is situated in the middle of the Wallachian Plain. It lies on the left bank of the river Colentina, which separates it from Bucharest, and forms three lakes along the way: Dobroești, Pantelimon, and Cernica.

The city borders to the southwest with Bucharest, to the west with Dobroești commune, to the northwest with the town of Voluntari, to the north with Afumați commune, to the northeast with Găneasa commune, to the east with Brănești commune, and to the south with Cernica and Glina communes.

The eastern part of Pantelimon is covered by the Cernica Forest, a remnant of the ancient Codrii Vlăsiei. The river Pasărea flows through the forest, forming the border with Brănești.

== Local government ==
The last local election was on September 27, 2020. The Mayor (Primar) of Pantelimon is Marian Ivan (PNL). The Pantelimon Local Council has 19 councillors. The council has the following party composition:

Party	Seats in 2020	Current Council
National Liberal Party	12	
Social Democratic Party	3	
USR PLUS	3	
People's Movement Party	1	

== Demographics ==
The town's population, according to the 2011 census, was 23,309 people, an increase from 16,019 persons in the 2002 census. In 2011, 93.2% of the population were ethnic Romanians, 5.9% Roma, and 0.9% others. At the 2021 census, Pantelimon had a population of 32,873; of those, 80.61% were Romanians and 2.83% Roma.

== Natives ==
- Daniel Novac (born 1987), footballer
- Nicolae Steinhardt (1912–1989), writer, Orthodox monk, and lawyer
- Vintilă Weiss (1921–1974), Securitate officer, torture victim, and whistleblower

== Transport ==
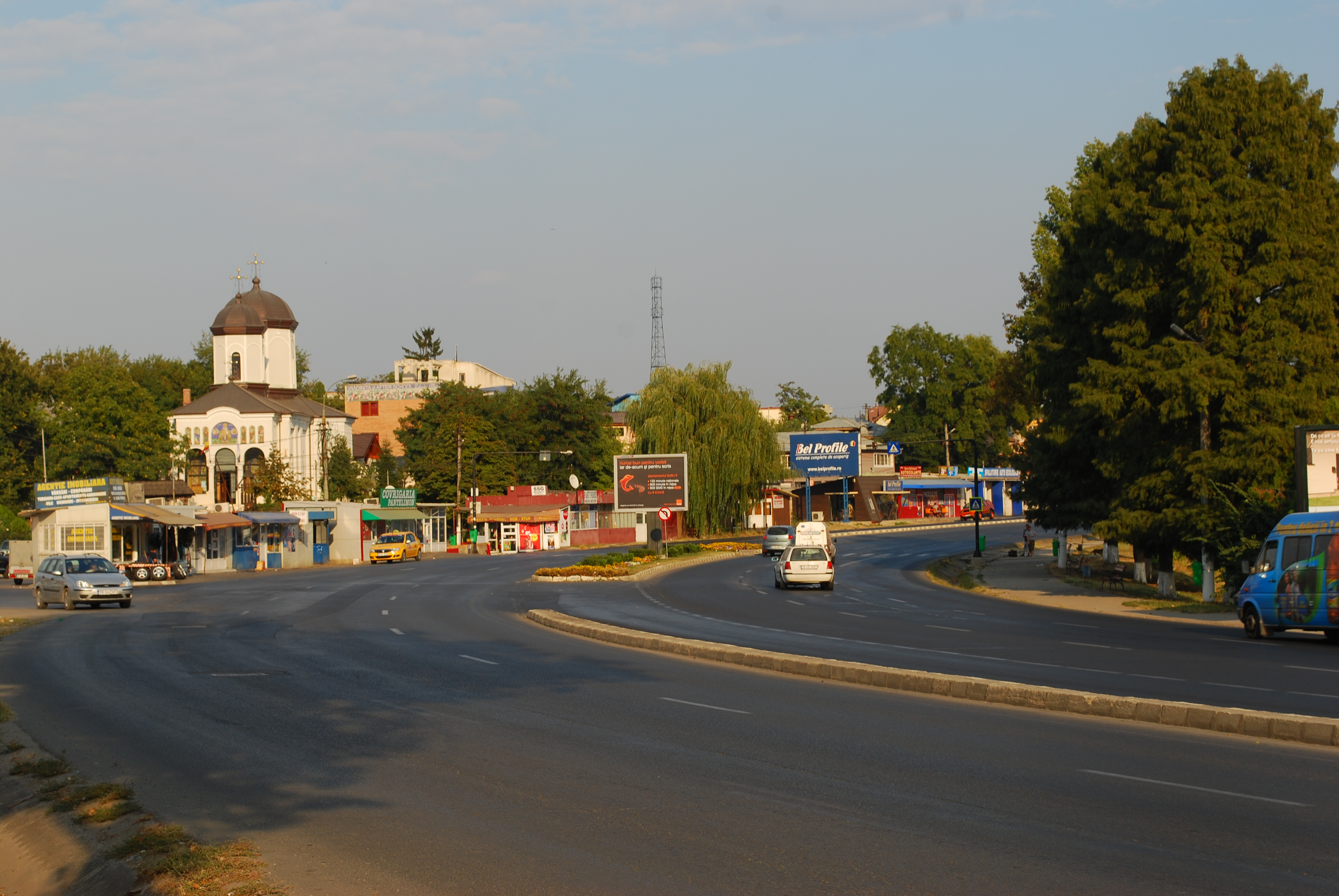
DN3 in Pantelimon

Pantelimon is traversed by national road DN3, which connects Bucharest to Călărași and Constanța to the east, and by Centura București, the ring road around the capital city. There is also a railroad station, serving the CFR Line 800, connecting Bucharest with the Black Sea coast at Mangalia.

The town is linked with Bucharest by small transport companies that operate minibuses from the town to several locations in Eastern Bucharest, where passengers can switch to RATB or the Bucharest Metro. Pantelimon metro station, the eastern starting point of the Bucharest Metro's M1 line, is located in the eastern extremity of Bucharest, near the Pantelimon town.

== Economy ==
The city's economy is closely related to that of Bucharest; of the city's workforce, most work in the capital. There are also some local enterprises, such as the bread factory Titan, and the beer factory owned by the United Romanian Breweries, which produces the Carlsberg and Tuborg beer brands.

== Points of interest ==
The main tourist attraction is Cernica Monastery, which lies on the shores of Lake Cernica, in the southeastern extremity of the town, near the border with Cernica commune.

On an island on the lake, the monastery has a cemetery where the writer Gala Galaction, the politician Pan Halippa, the producer Marioara Murărescu, the actress Stela Popescu, the musician Johnny Răducanu the film director Geo Saizescu, the theologian Dumitru Stăniloae, the painter Ion Țuculescu, and the singer Zavaidoc are buried.
