= Găneasa =

Găneasa may refer to several places in Romania:

- Găneasa, Ilfov, a commune in Ilfov County
- Găneasa, Olt, a commune in Olt County
