= CS Brănești =

Romanian amateur football club

- Full name: Clubul Sportiv Brănești
- Nickname: Brăneștenii
- Short name: Brănești
- Founded: 1968; 58 years ago as Victoria Brănești; 2019; 7 years ago as CS Brănești
- Ground: Cătălin Hîldan
- Capacity: 2,500
- Chairman: Andrei Cizvoardă
- Manager: Marius Șerban
- League: Liga IV
- 2025–26: Liga IV, Ilfov County, 8th of 9
Home colours	Away colours

Clubul Sportiv Brănești is a Romanian football club based in Brănești, Ilfov County. Founded in 1968, the club was dissolved in 2012 and later refounded in 2019. At its peak, the team competed in the Romanian top flight under the name Victoria Brănești, during the 2010–11 season. The club made history by becoming the team from the smallest locality ever to play in Liga I, with just 8,531 inhabitants — surpassing the previous record held by Otopeni.

== History ==
Old logo

Old logo, used in the Liga I

The football team was founded in 1968 by football-loving people from the Brănești commune and spent its entire history in the lower leagues of the Romanian football system.

The club's rise practically began in 2007, after it bought the place of Transkurier Sfântu Gheorghe in Liga III. In its first season in the third tier, where Victoria’s objective was to avoid relegation, the team succeeded by finishing 8th in Series III. In 2008, Ilie Stan was appointed head coach and led the team to win Series III of the 2008–09 season, earning promotion to Liga II for the first time.

In its debut season in Liga II, Victoria dominated and achieved promotion in emphatic fashion, winning Series I under the guidance of Ilie Stan under the guidance of Ilie Stan and with the following players among others Alin Bordeanu, Cristian Stoicescu, Sergiu Bar, Valentin Velicu, Stelian Isac, Eduard Nicola, Dorinel Popa, Sorin Ispir, Viorel Nicoară, Daniel Novac, Augustin Chiriță, Vasile Olariu, Nicolae Zuluf, Răzvan Avram, Valentin Alexandru, Ion Coman, and Bogdan Oprea, thus securing promotion to Liga I for the first time in the club's history.

The team was relegated after only one season in Liga I. They started the 2011–12 season in the Liga II, but after 15 rounds the team was second to last. In February 2012, the team was disaffiliated by the Federation due to financial problems.

After the dissolution, Brănești continued to play as Vulturii Pasărea until 2019. In 2019 the club was officially refounded as CS Brănești.

== Stadium ==
CS Brănești played its home matches on the Cătălin Hîldan Stadium, which has a capacity of 2,500 seats.

The Liga I matches were played on the Municipal Stadium in Buzău and the Concordia Stadium in Chiajna, because theirs did not meet the requirements for the first division.

== Honours ==
Liga II:

- Winners (1): 2009–10

Liga III:

- Winners (1): 2008–09

Liga IV – Ilfov County

- Runners-up (1): 2021–22

Cupa României – Ilfov County

- Winners (2): 2018–19, 2020–21
