= Pasărea (Dâmbovița) =

- Location within Romania

Location
- Country: Romania
- Counties: Ilfov, Călărași
- Villages: Afumați, Găneasa, Brănești, Fundeni

Physical characteristics
- Mouth: Dâmbovița
  - location: Fundeni
  - coordinates: 44.3666°N 26.3486°E
- Length: 48 km (30 mi)
- Basin size: 254 km^{2} (98 sq mi)

Basin features
- Progression: Dâmbovița→ Argeș→ Danube→ Black Sea
- Tributaries
  - left: Șindrilița

The Pasărea is a left tributary of the river Dâmbovița in Romania. It discharges into the Dâmbovița in Fundeni. Its length is 48 km (30 mi) and its basin size is 254 km^{2} (98 sq mi).
