= Daniel Novac =

Romanian footballer

Personal information
- Full name: Daniel Ionuț Novac
- Date of birth: 26 September 1987 (age 39)
- Place of birth: Pantelimon, Romania
- Height: 1.80 m (5 ft 11 in)
- Positions: Midfielder; right winger

Youth career
- 1997–2005: Inter Gaz București

Senior career*
Years	Team	Apps	(Gls)
2005–2008	Inter Gaz București	25	(0)
2009	Politehnica Iași B	0	(0)
2009–2011	Victoria Brănești	33	(3)
2011	Oțelul Galați	0	(0)
2012–2013	Sportul Studențesc	28	(1)
2013	Concordia Chiajna	9	(0)
2013–2014	CSMS Iași	26	(1)
2015–2018	Voluntari	101	(3)
2018–2020	Chindia Târgoviște	53	(2)
2020–2021	Universitatea Cluj	12	(2)
2022	Foresta Suceava	6	(1)
2022	Ceahlăul Piatra Neamț	14	(0)
2023	Tunari	11	(0)
Total		318	(13)
- * Club domestic league appearances and goals as of 16:17, 24 January 2024 (UTC)

Daniel Ionuț Novac (born 26 September 1987) is a Romanian footballer who plays as a midfielder.

== Honours ==
Victoria Brănești

- Liga II: 2009–10

CSMS Iași

- Liga II: 2013–14

FC Voluntari

- Liga II: 2014–15
- Romanian Cup: 2016–17
- Romanian Supercup: 2017

Chindia Târgoviște

- Liga II: 2018–19

CS Tunari

- Liga III: 2022–23
