= Nicolae Zuluf =

Romanian footballer

Personal information
- Date of birth: 3 April 1988 (age 38)
- Place of birth: Brăneşti, SR Romania
- Height: 1.72 m (5 ft 7 1/2 in)
- Position: Left midfielder

Team information
- Current team: FC Bolintin Malu Spart 2017

Youth career
- Victoria Brăneşti

Senior career*
Years	Team	Apps	(Gls)
2010–2011	Victoria Brăneşti	23	(4)
2012	Mioveni	8	(1)
2012	Turnu Severin	2	(0)
2012–2013	Concordia Chiajna	23	(1)
2014–2015	CS Afumați	0	(0)
2016–2018	Voința Crevedia		
2018–	FC Bolintin Malu Spart 2017		(1)
- * Club domestic league appearances and goals as of 23 September 2016

Nicolae Zuluf (born 3 April 1988) is a Romanian footballer who plays for FC Bolintin Malu Spart 2017.
