= Sorin Ispir =

Romanian footballer

Personal information
- Full name: Sorin Constantin Ispir
- Date of birth: 26 July 1988 (age 38)
- Place of birth: Brănești, Romania
- Height: 1.82 m (6 ft 0 in)
- Position: Right midfielder

Youth career
- Steaua București
- Concordia Chiajna

Senior career*
Years	Team	Apps	(Gls)
2008	Tricolorul Breaza	10	(2)
2008–2011	Victoria Brănești	53	(5)
2012	Mioveni	8	(0)
2012–2014	Concordia Chiajna	40	(2)
2014–2015	Academica Argeș	19	(1)
2015–2017	Voluntari	0	(0)
2015–2017	→ Voluntari II	3	(0)
2017	Afumați	6	(0)
2018	Metaloglobus București	10	(0)
2018–2022	Metalul Buzău	45	(4)
Total		194	(14)
- * Club domestic league appearances and goals as of 07:19, 21 June 2022 (UTC)

Sorin Constantin Ispir (born 26 July 1988) is a Romanian footballer who plays as a midfielder. In his career, Ispir also played for teams such as Victoria Brănești, Concordia Chiajna, Academica Clinceni or Metaloglobus București, among others.
