= Cristian Hîldan =

- Born: Cristian Nicolin Hîldan; 22 September 1973 (age 53) Bucharest, Romania
- Height: 5 ft 11 in (1.80 m)
- Weight: 180 lb (82 kg; 12 st 12 lb)
- Notable relative: Cătălin Hîldan (brother)

Rugby union career
- Position: Wing
Senior career
| Years | Team | Apps | (Points) |
- Dinamo București
International career
| Years | Team | Apps | (Points) |
| 1998–1999 | Romania | 4 | (0) |
Coaching career
- Years: Team
- 2015–2021: Dinamo București

Cristian Hîldan (born 22 September 1973 in Bucharest) is a former Romanian rugby union footballer and currently a rugby union coach. He was a member of the national team and also an unused substitute at the 1999 Rugby World Cup. He played as a wing.

== Personal life ==
Cristian is the older brother of the late Cătălin Hîldan, a professional football player who played for Dinamo and the Romania national football team.
