= Brănești, Ilfov =

Brănești
- Commune
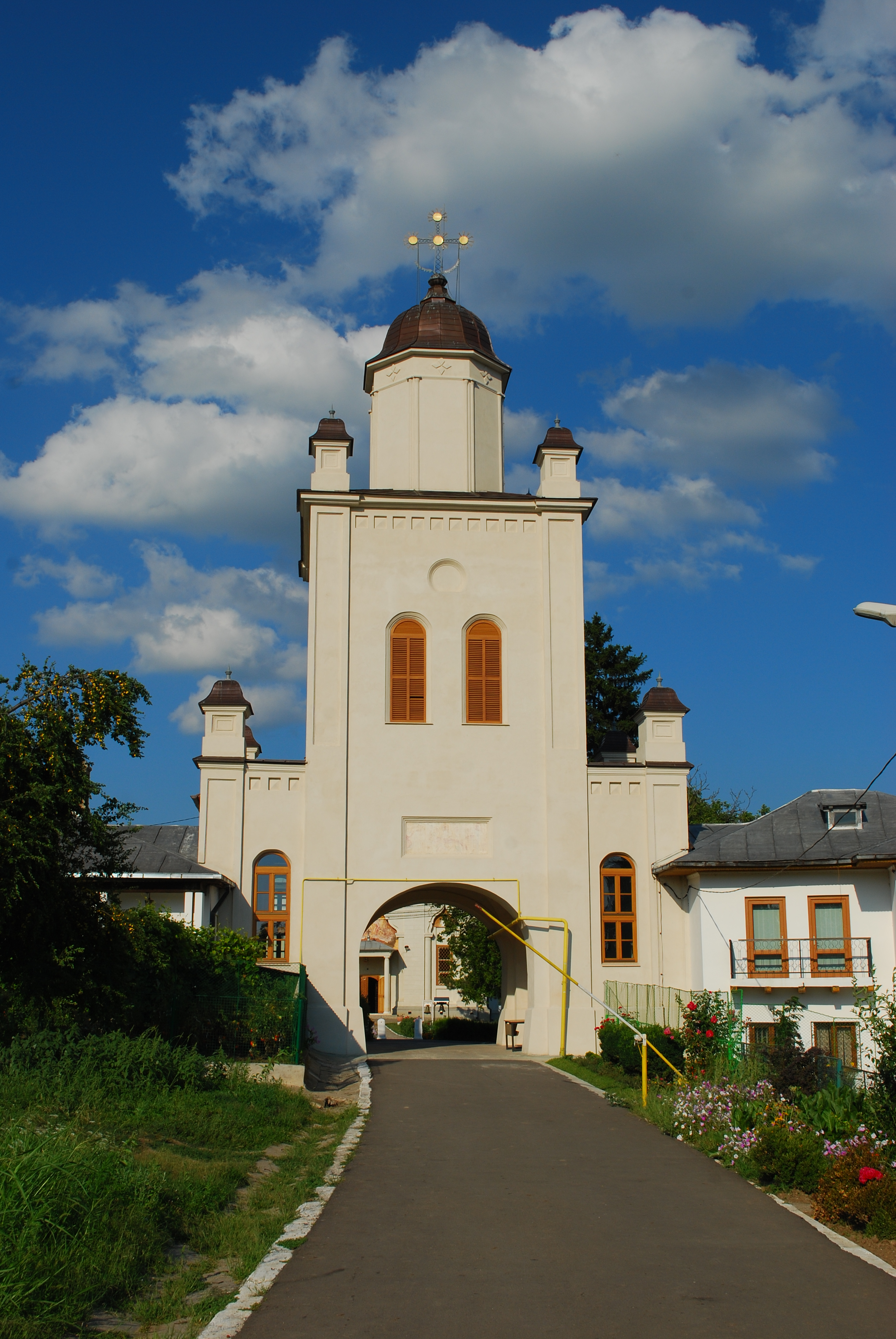
- Pasărea Monastery belfry

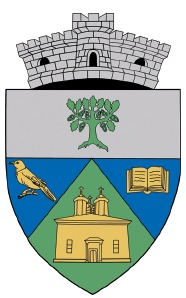
- Coat of arms

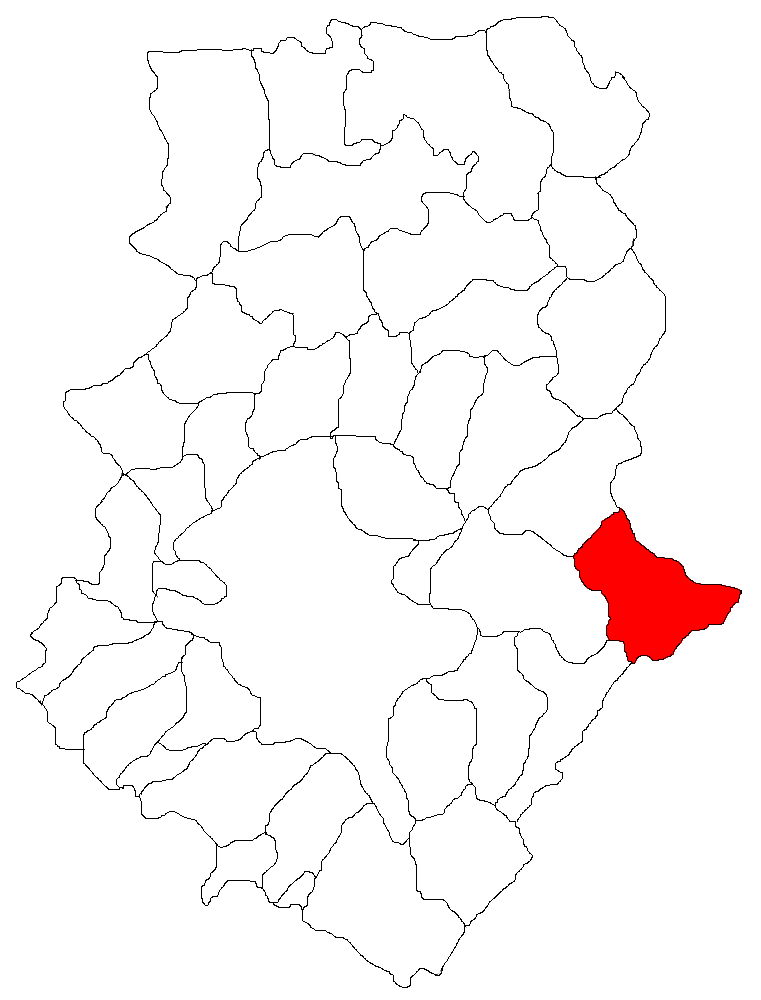
- Location in Ilfov County

- Location in Romania
- Coordinates: 44°27′N 26°20′E
- Country: Romania
- County: Ilfov

Government
  - Mayor (2020–2024): Niculae Cismaru (PNL)
- Area: 53 km^{2} (20 sq mi)
- Elevation: 71 m (233 ft)
- Population (2021-12-01): 10,708
  - Density: 200/km^{2} (520/sq mi)
- Time zone: UTC+02:00 (EET)
  - Summer (DST): UTC+03:00 (EEST)
- Postal code: 77030
- Area code: +(40) 021
- Vehicle reg.: IF
- Website: www.primaria-branesti.ro

Brănești is a commune in the far east of Ilfov County, Muntenia, Romania. Its name is derived from Bran, a Romanian name, and the suffix -ești. It is composed of four villages: Brănești, Islaz, Pasărea, and Vadu Anei.

The commune is located 21 km (13 mi) east of downtown Bucharest, on the border with Călărași County. It lies on the left bank of the river Pasărea, which separates it from the town of Pantelimon and the commune Cernica to the west.

Brănești is traversed by the A2 motorway, which connects Bucharest to Constanța on the Black Sea coast, and by national road DN3, which connects Bucharest to Călărași and on to Constanța. County road DJ100 goes south towards Fundeni and northwest towards Găneasa, Afumați, Ștefăneștii de Jos, Tunari, and Otopeni.

The commune also has several train stations that serve the CFR Line 800, which runs from Bucharest to the Black Sea coast.

Pasărea Monastery, dating from 1813, is located in Pasărea village.

The Cătălin Hîldan Stadium was the home stadium of FC Victoria Brănești, a professional football club founded in 1968 and dissolved in 2012.

Brănești has three high schools: the Traian Lalescu Theoretical High School, the Cezar Nicolau Technological High School, and the Theodor Pietraru Forest College.

Historical population
Year	Pop.	±%
2002	8,531	—
2011	10,367	+21.5%
2021	10,708	+3.3%
Source: Census data

== Natives ==
- Cătălin Hîldan (1976–2000), footballer
- Sorin Ispir (born 1988), footballer
- Eduard Pană (born 1944), ice hockey player
- Nicolae Zuluf (born 1988), footballer
