= Cătălin Hîldan =

Romanian footballer

Personal information
- Full name: Cătălin George Hîldan
- Date of birth: 3 February 1976
- Place of birth: Brănești, Ilfov, Romania
- Date of death: 5 October 2000 (aged 24)
- Place of death: Oltenița, Romania
- Height: 1.76 m (5 ft 9 in)
- Position: Midfielder

Youth career
- 1986–1994: Dinamo București

Senior career*
Years	Team	Apps	(Gls)
1994–2000	Dinamo București	138	(6)
1995–1996	→ Oțelul Târgoviște (Note: The statistics for the 1994–95 Divizia C season are unavailable.) (loan)	13	(1)
Total		151	(7)

International career
1996–1998	Romania U21	16	(0)
1999–2000	Romania	8	(1)
- * Club domestic league appearances and goals

Cătălin George Hîldan (3 February 1976 – 5 October 2000) was a Romanian professional footballer who played as a midfielder.

== Early life and club career ==
Hîldan was born on 3 February 1976 in Brănești, Ilfov, Romania. He first came into contact with sports at the age of eight at the rugby club Olimpia together with his older brother Cristian. Two years later, in the summer of 1986, he joined football club Dinamo București where he worked with coach Ionuț Chirilă, playing alongside Florentin Petre, Mihai Tararache and others. His first senior match for Dinamo was on 2 October 1994 when coach Ion Moldovan sent him in the 39th minute to replace Sulejman Demollari in a Divizia A derby against Steaua București that ended with a 2–0 loss. After a couple of months he was loaned to Oțelul Târgoviște in the third league, where Hîldan helped the team win promotion to the second division and then to the first.

He was recalled to Dinamo by coach Cornel Dinu. In a couple of years he became the team's captain. In the 1999–2000 season, under the guidance of Dinu, Hîldan played 29 league games in which he scored one goal, helping Dinamo win the title. That was the first championship earned by the club in nine years, and was mathematically won after a 3–2 victory against Steaua. In the same season, he scored the second goal of the 2–0 victory in the Cupa României final against Universitatea Craiova. On 1 October 2000, Hîldan made his last Divizia A appearance in a 3–2 home loss to Petrolul Ploiești, totaling 138 matches with six goals in Divizia A and 11 matches in European competitions.

== International career ==
Hîldan was part of Romania's under-21 side that managed a first-ever qualification to a European Championship in 1998, which Romania subsequently hosted. In the final tournament that was composed of eight teams, coach Victor Pițurcă used him in all three games which were losses to Netherlands, Germany and Russia, as they finished in last place.

Hîldan played eight friendly games and scored one goal for Romania, making his debut on 3 March 1999 when coach Pițurcă introduced him in the 85th minute to replace Gheorghe Popescu in a 2–0 victory against Estonia. He scored his only goal for the national team in a 1–1 draw against Georgia. He played his last game on 3 June 2000 in a 2–1 win over Greece. Hîldan was selected by coach Emerich Jenei to be part of Romania's squad in the Euro 2000 final tournament, but did not play in any games there.

=== International goals ===
Scores and results list Romania's goal tally first, score column indicates score after each Hîldan goal.

List of international goals scored by Cătălin Hîldan
#	Date	Venue	Cap	Opponent	Score	Result	Competition
1	4 February 2000	Antonis Papadopoulos Stadium, Larnaca, Cyprus	4	Georgia	1–1	1–1	Friendly match

== Death and legacy ==
Dinamo supporters paying homage to Cătălin Hîldan in 2005.

Hîldan died on 5 October 2000 after suffering a stroke during the 74th minute of a friendly match between Dinamo and Șantierul Naval Oltenița. He collapsed on the pitch and was later pronounced dead at a hospital in Oltenița. He was only 24 years old. There were rumours that he may have used performance-enhancing drugs, which allegedly contributed to his death. Hîldan's family rejected the doping theory. His brother stated that he had not taken prohibited medication and that tests sent to Cologne were negative.

Before his death, Hîldan was known among Dinamo's fans as "The Only Captain", a name that became even more widely used after his passing. In his honour, Dinamo retired his number 11 shirt and unveiled a statue of him at Dinamo Stadium. The north stand of the stadium was named "Peluza Cătălin Hîldan", and Stadionul Cătălin Hîldan in his native Brănești was also named after him.

In 2003, sports journalist Ioan Chilom wrote a book about his life and career titled Unicul căpitan. Cătălin Hîldan, câine până la moarte (The Only Captain. Cătălin Hîldan, a Red Dog Until Death).

Romanian singers Don Baxter and Moni-K also performed a song dedicated to him titled Înger pentru o zi (Angel for a Day).

== Honours ==
Oțelul Târgoviște

- Divizia B: 1995–96
- Divizia C: 1994–95

Dinamo București

- Divizia A: 1999–2000
- Cupa României: 1999–2000

== See also ==
- List of footballers who died after on-field incidents
