= Afumați, Ilfov =

Afumați
- Commune
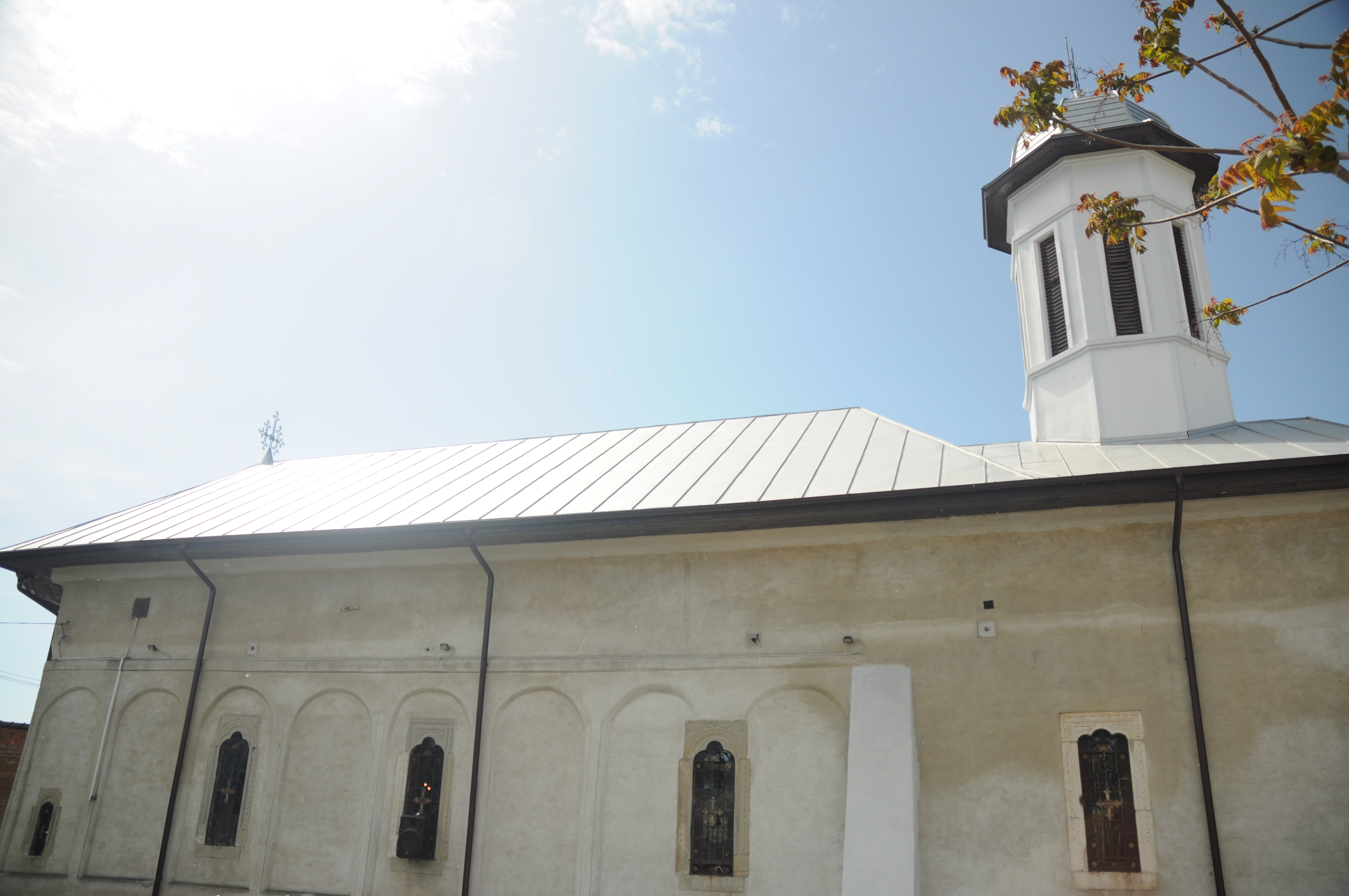
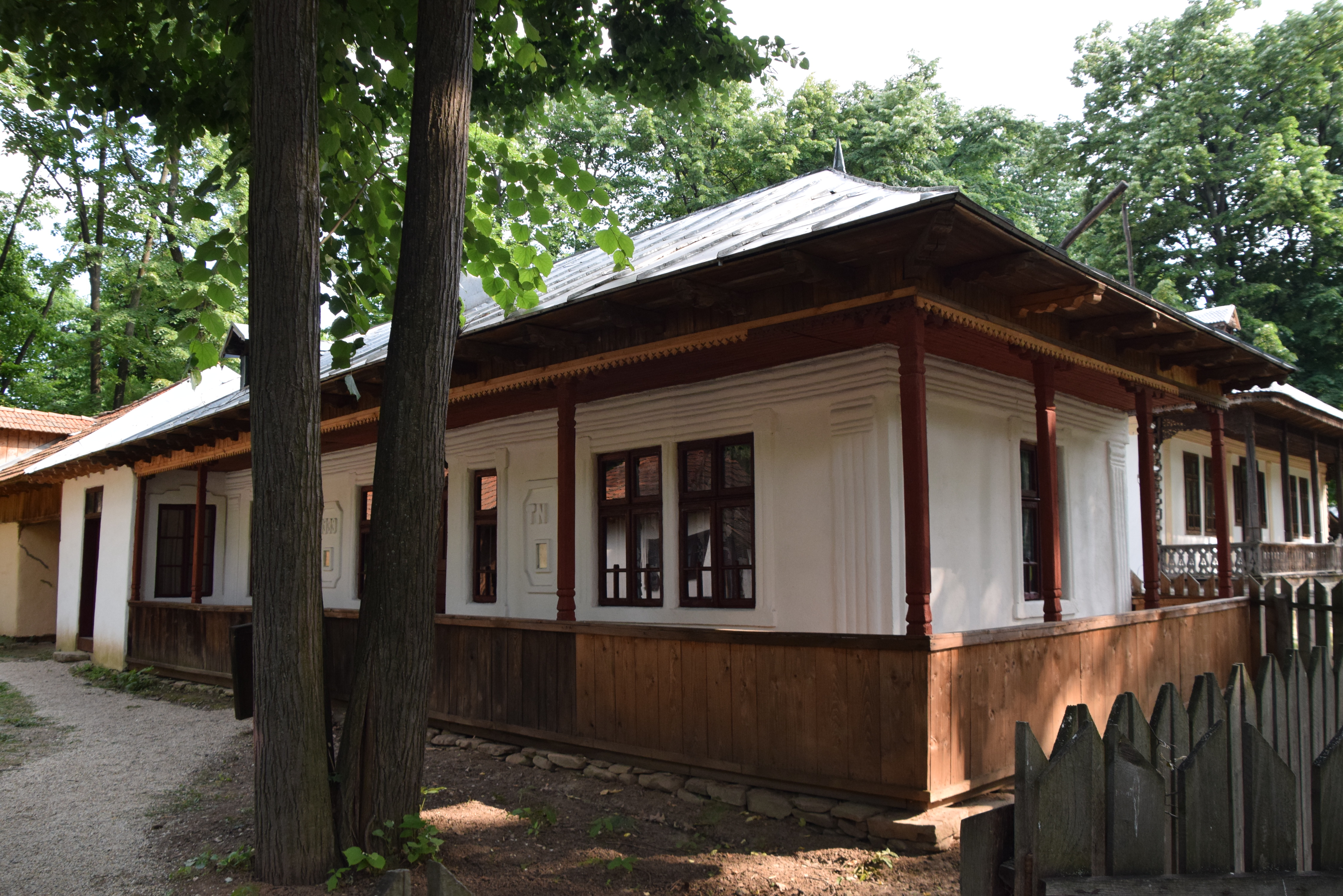
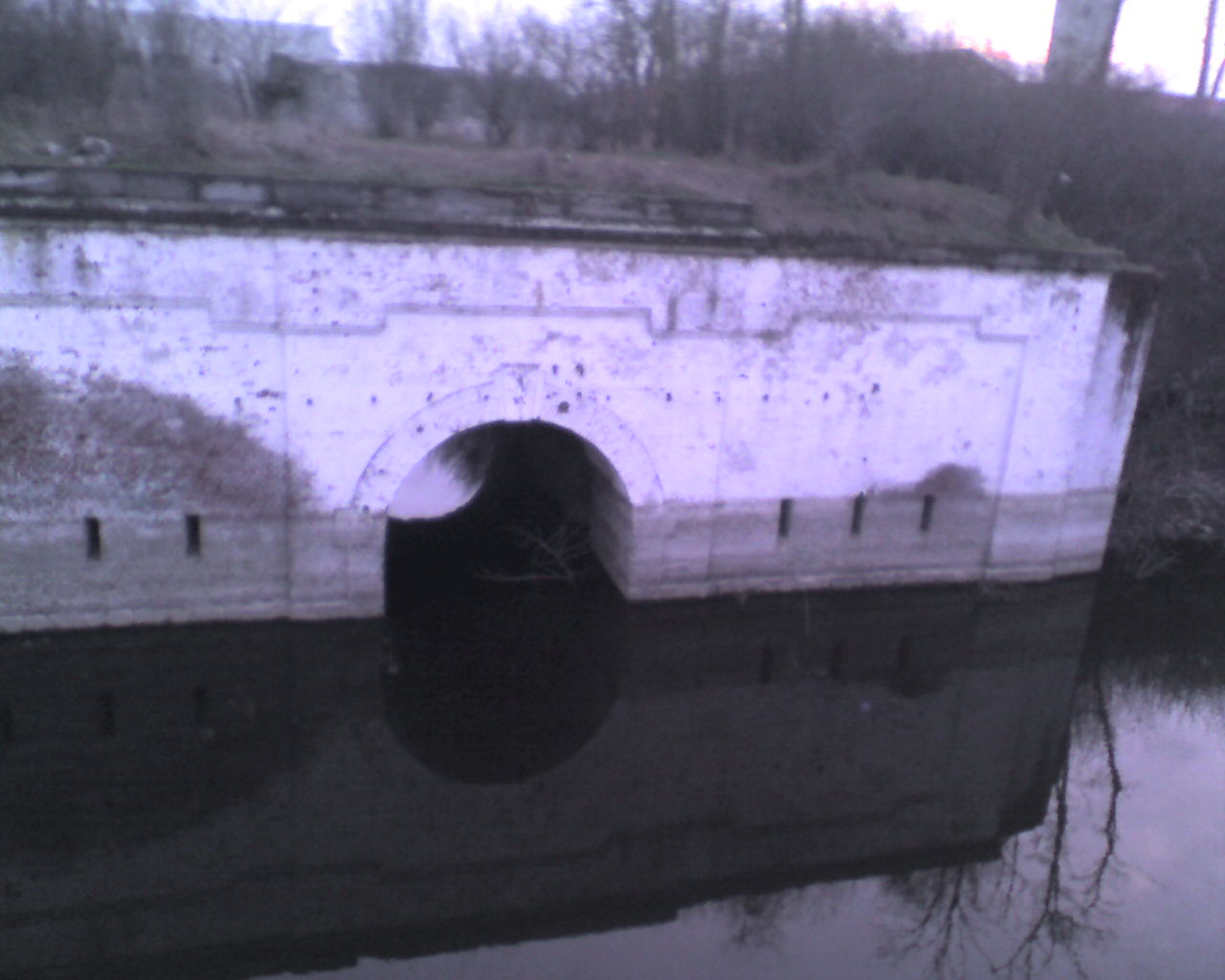
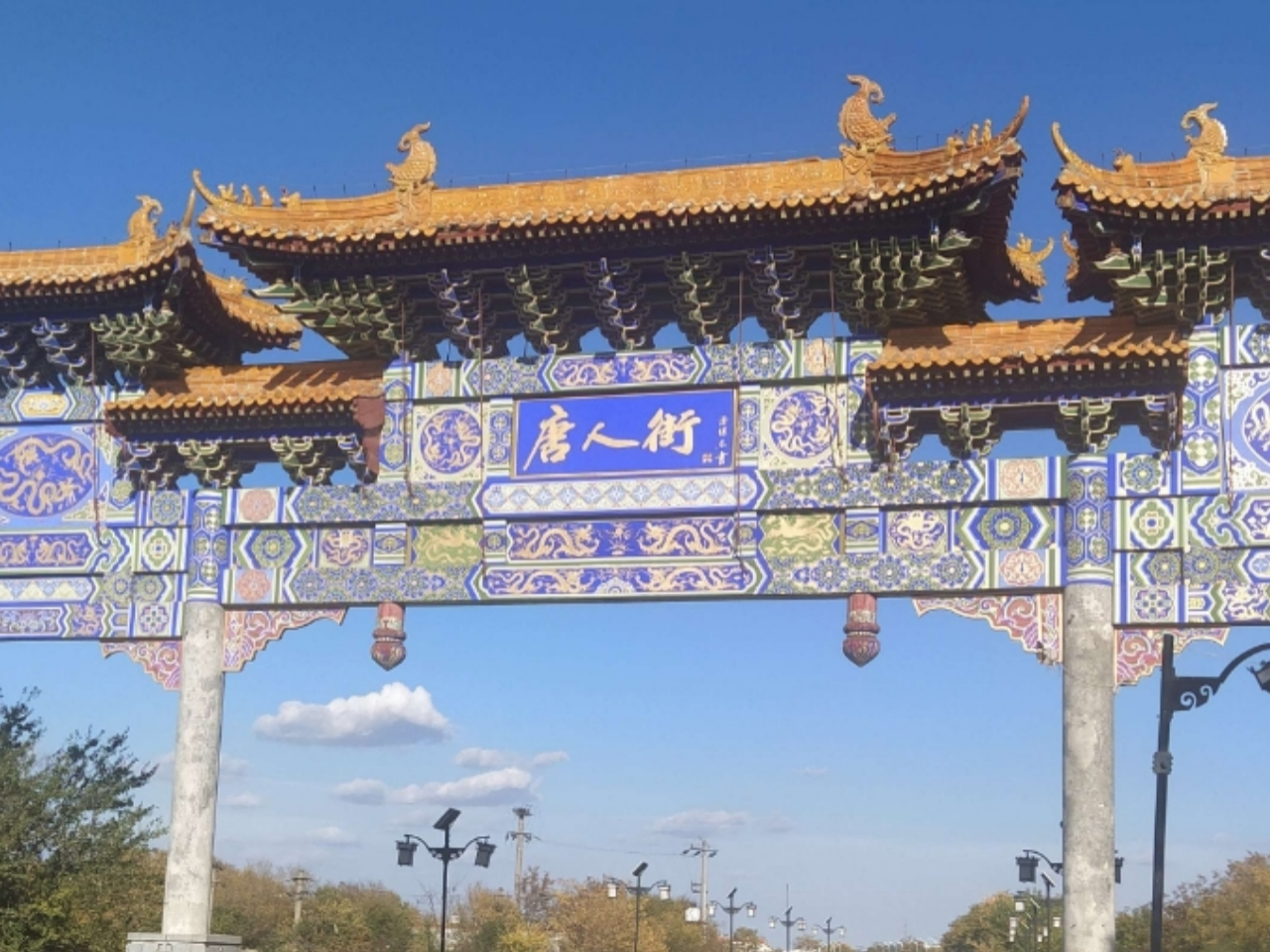
- From top, left to right: Church in Afumați; Village Museum; Fort 6; Afumați Chinatown Gate

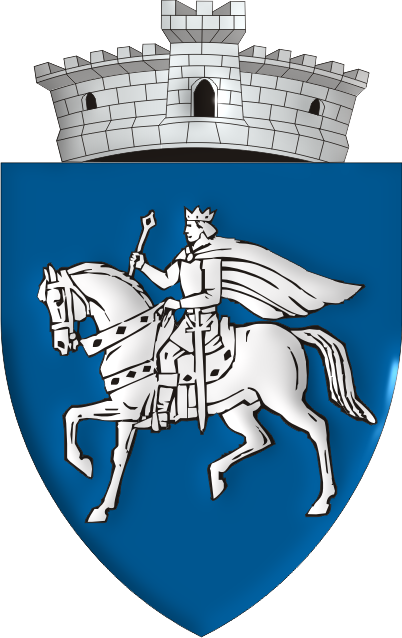
- Coat of arms

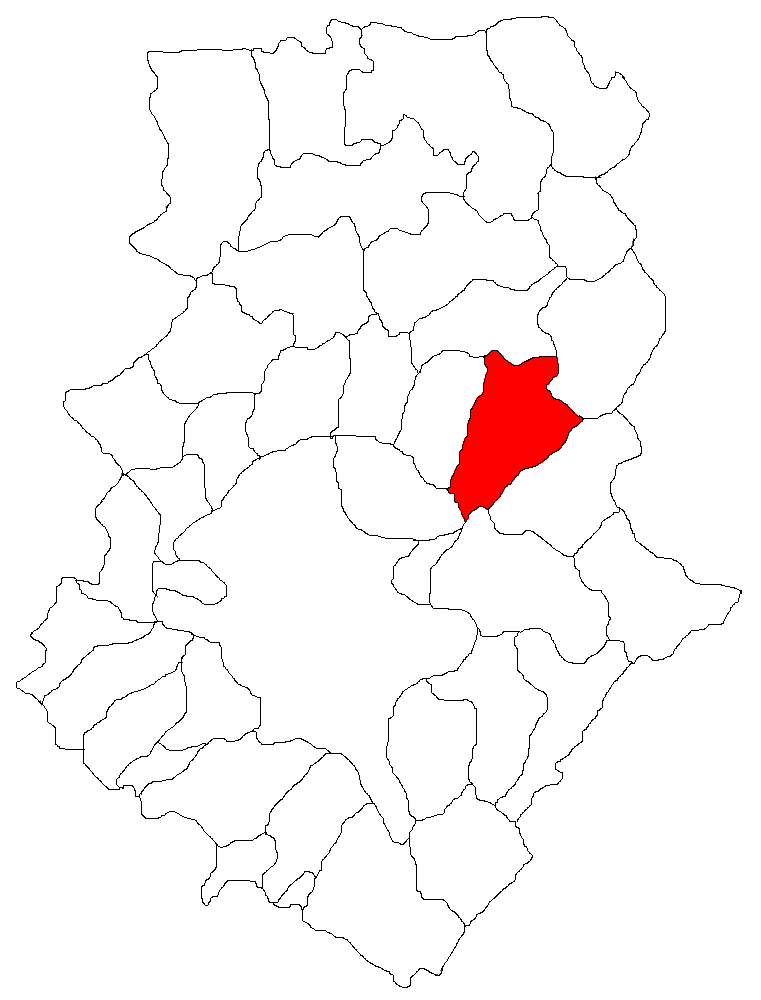
- Location in Ilfov County

- Location in Romania
- Coordinates: 44°31′30″N 26°15′8″E
- Country: Romania
- County: Ilfov

Government
  - Mayor (2024–2028): Gabriel Dumănică (PNL)
- Area: 63.25 km^{2} (24.42 sq mi)
- Elevation: 81 m (266 ft)
- Population (2021-12-01): 8,748
  - Density: 138.3/km^{2} (358.2/sq mi)
- Time zone: UTC+02:00 (EET)
  - Summer (DST): UTC+03:00 (EEST)
- Postal code: 077010
- Area code: +(40) 021
- Vehicle reg.: IF
- Website: www.primariaafumati.ro

Afumați is a commune in the east of Ilfov County, Muntenia, Romania, composed of a single village, Afumați. Its name is derived from the Romanian verb "a afuma", meaning to smoke food.

The commune is located 15 km (9.3 mi) northeast of downtown Bucharest, on the left bank of the river Pasărea. The ruins of the Princely Court of Radu of Afumați, Voivode of Wallachia from 1522 to 1529, are located at the entrance in the commune.

Afumați is traversed by the DN2 road, which connects Bucharest to Urziceni. It is bordered on the north by Dascălu commune, on the west by Ștefăneștii de Jos commune, on the south by the town of Pantelimon, on the southeast by Găneasa commune, and on the northeast by Petrăchioaia commune.

Stadionul Comunal is a multi-use stadium located in Afumați. It is currently used mostly for football matches and is the home ground of the CS Afumați football club.

Historical population
Year	Pop.	±%
2002	6,613	—
2011	7,919	+19.7%
2021	8,748	+10.5%
Source: Census data

== Natives ==
- Constantin Nica
- Dumitru Popescu-Colibași
