= Petrăchioaia =

- Commune
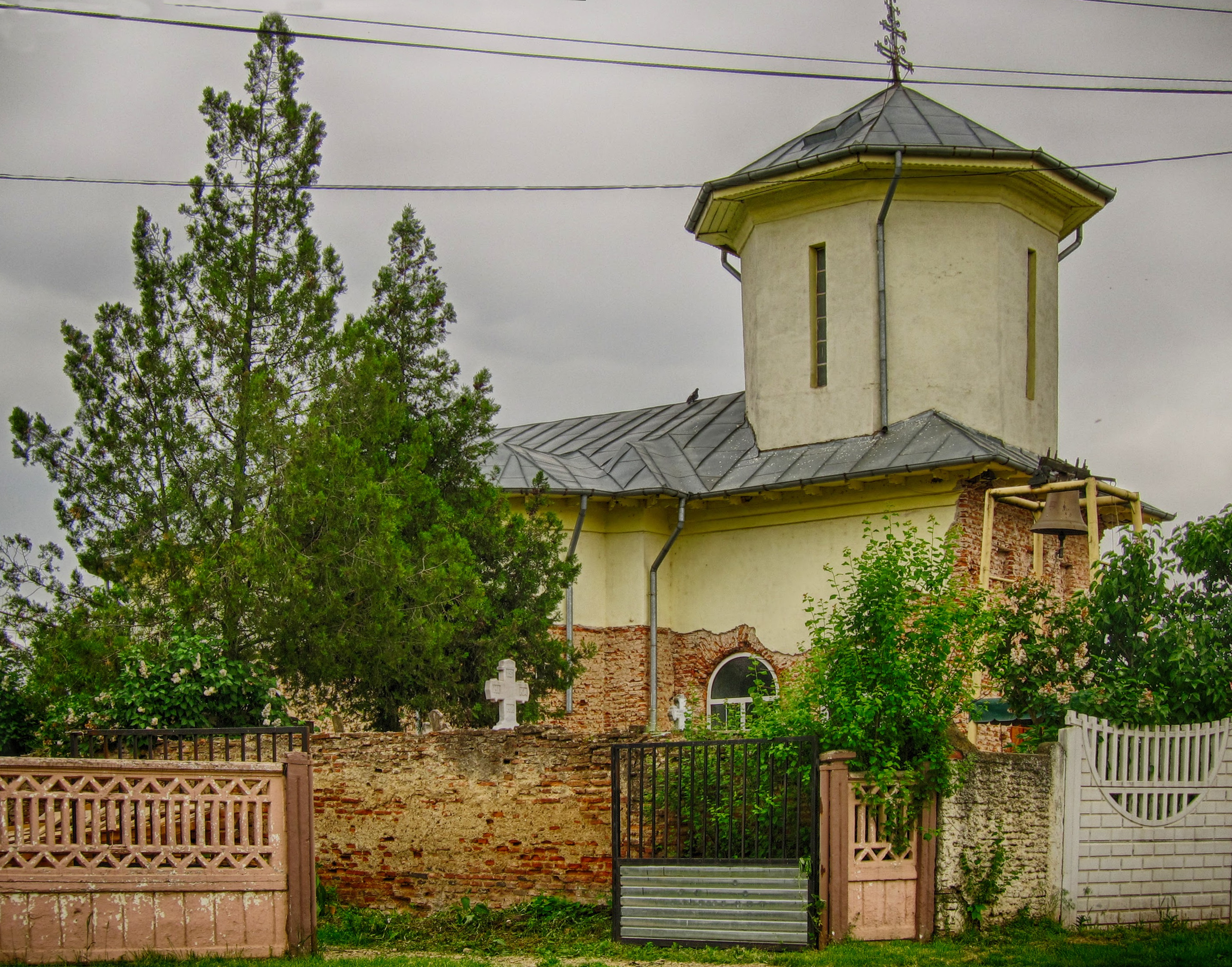
- Assumption Church in Petrăchioaia

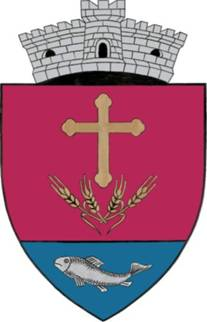
- Coat of arms

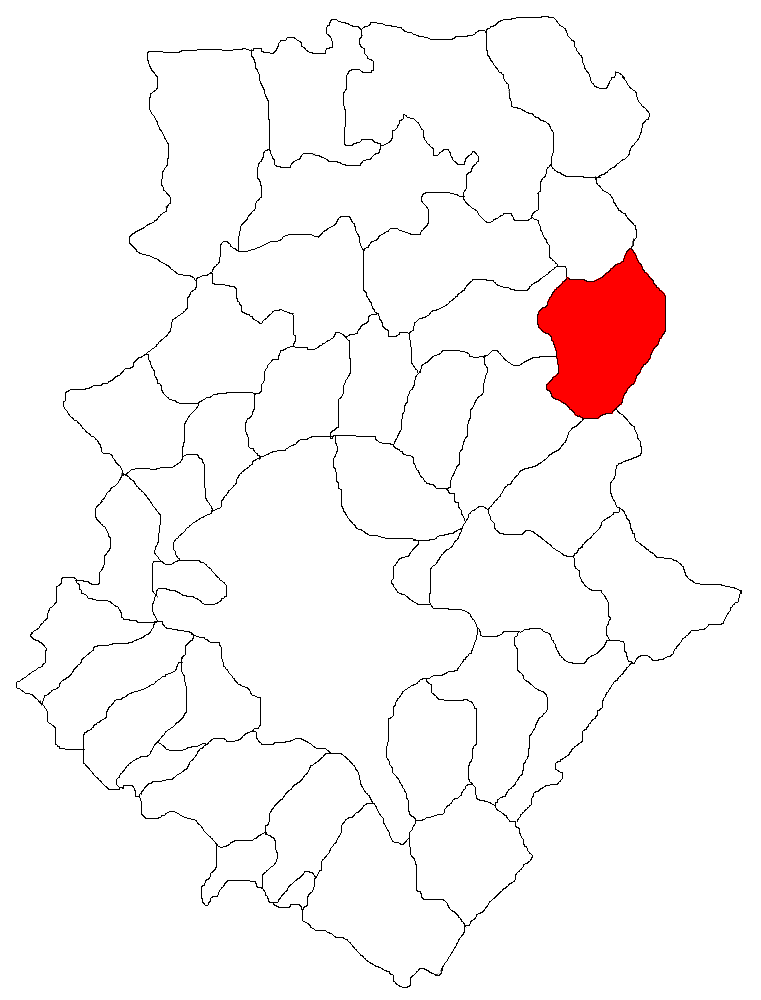
- Location in Ilfov County

- Location in Romania
- Coordinates: 44°35′N 26°19′E
- Country: Romania
- County: Ilfov

Government
  - Mayor (2020–2024): Mihai Dobre (PNL)
- Area: 57 km^{2} (22 sq mi)
- Elevation: 80 m (260 ft)
- Population (2021-12-01): 3,695
  - Density: 65/km^{2} (170/sq mi)
- Time zone: UTC+02:00 (EET)
  - Summer (DST): UTC+03:00 (EEST)
- Postal code: 077155
- Area code: +(40) 21
- Vehicle reg.: IF
- Website: primaria-petrachioaia.ro

Petrăchioaia is a commune in the east of Ilfov County, Muntenia, Romania. It is composed of four villages: Măineasca, Surlari, Petrăchioaia, and Vânători. Its name is a feminine form of Petrache, which in turn is a name of Greek origin, derived from Petrakis.

Historical population
Year	Pop.	±% p.a.
2002	2,823	—
2011	3,498	+2.41%
2021	3,695	+0.55%
Source: Census data
