= Cernica =

- Commune
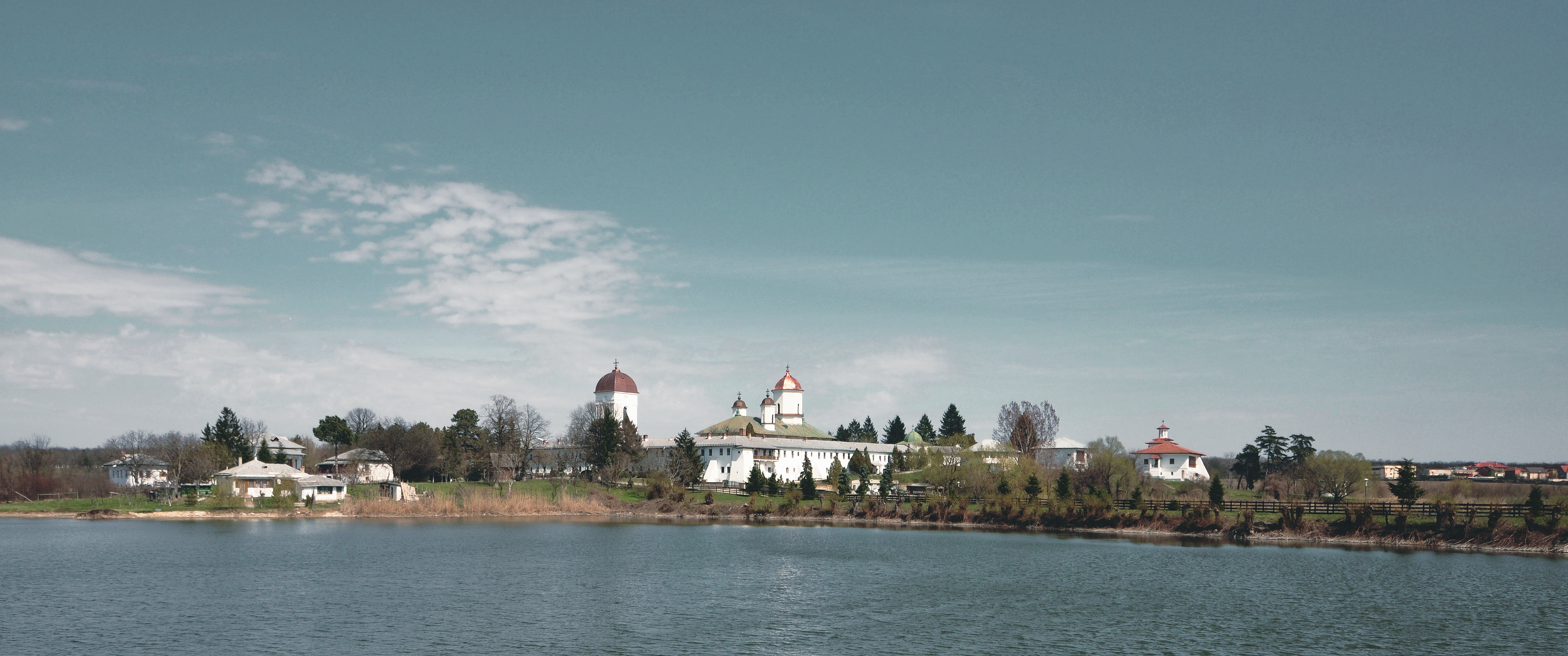

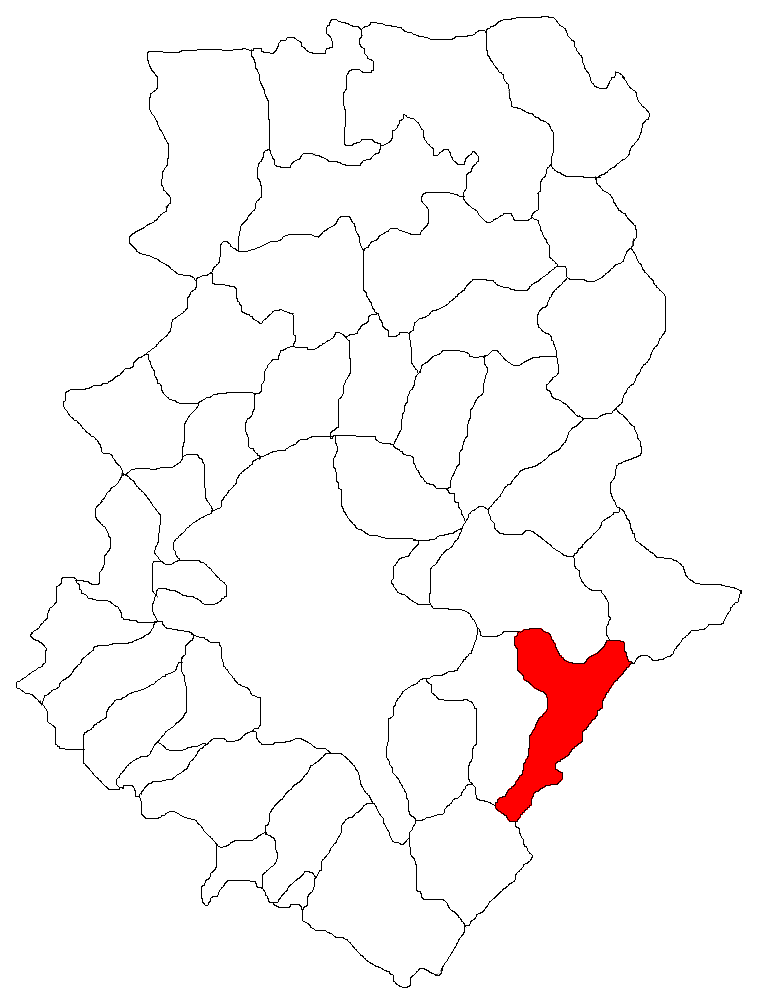
- Location in Ilfov County

- Location in Romania
- Coordinates: 44°25′N 26°17′E
- Country: Romania
- County: Ilfov

Government
  - Mayor (2020–2024): Gelu Apostol (PNL)
- Area: 38 km^{2} (15 sq mi)
- Elevation: 61 m (200 ft)
- Population (2021-12-01): 11,871
  - Density: 310/km^{2} (810/sq mi)
- Time zone: UTC+02:00 (EET)
  - Summer (DST): UTC+03:00 (EEST)
- Postal code: 077035
- Area code: +(40) 21
- Vehicle reg.: IF
- Website: www.cernica.ro

Cernica is a commune in the southeast part of Ilfov County, Muntenia, Romania, with a population of 11,871 as of 2021. It is composed of five villages: Bălăceanca, Căldăraru, Cernica, Poșta, and Tânganu.

The commune is situated in the Wallachian Plain, on the banks of the Dâmbovița River and its left tributary, the Colentina River. It is located in the southeastern part of Ilfov County, 17 km (11 mi) east of downtown Bucharest, on the border with Călărași County. Cernica is crossed by the A2 motorway, which links Bucharest with the port city of Constanța.

The commune lent its name to the Cernica Monastery, an early 17th-century Orthodox monastery in the nearby town of Pantelimon. The name is also given to the Cernica Forest, the largest wooded area around Bucharest.

The name of the commune is derived from the name of the vornic Cernica Știrbei and is of Slavic origin, meaning "black".

Historical population
Year	Pop.	±%
2002	9,425	—
2011	10,886	+15.5%
2021	11,871	+9.0%
Source: Census data
