= Ilfov County =

County of Romania

Ilfov County Județul Ilfov
- County
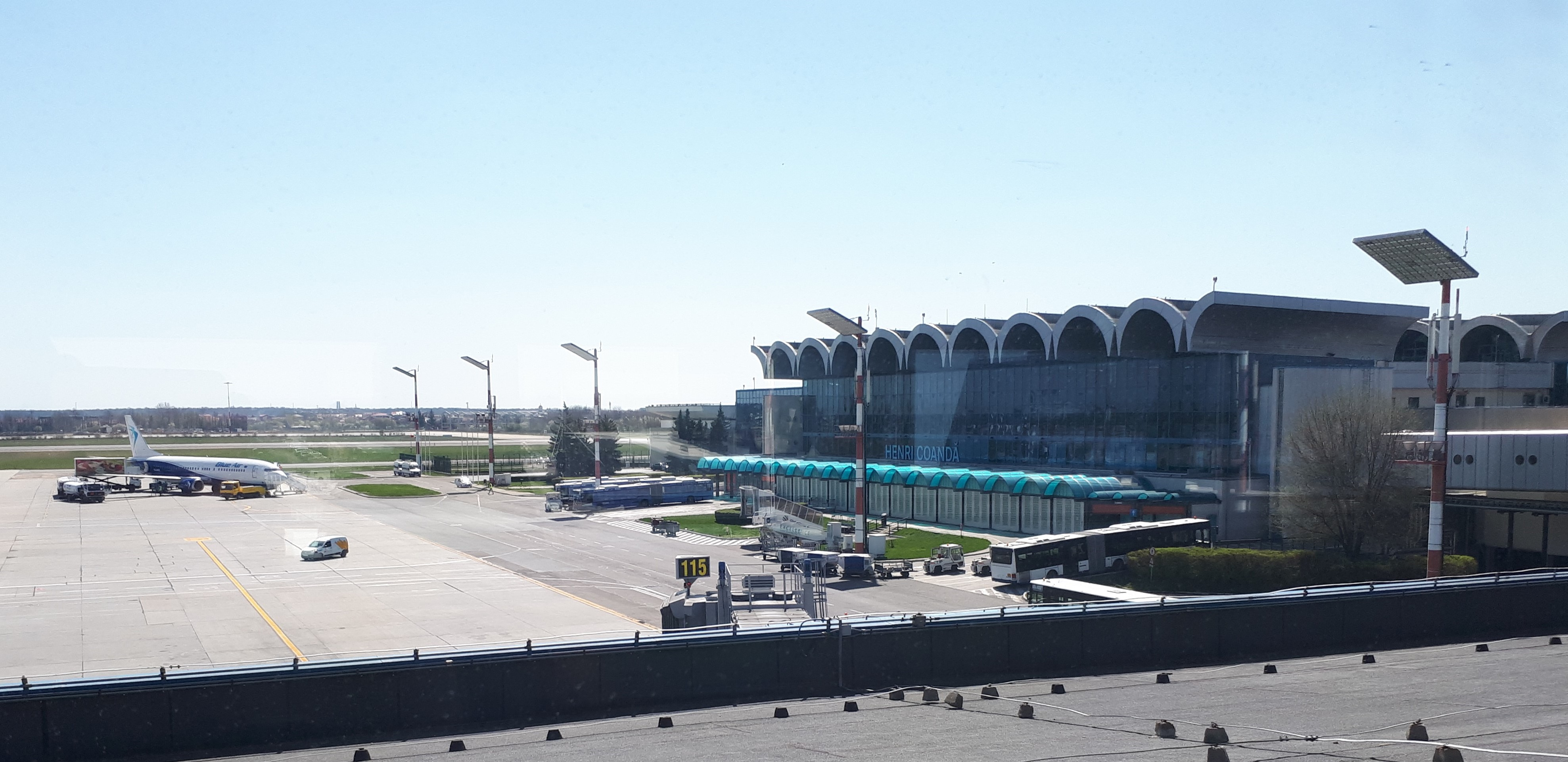
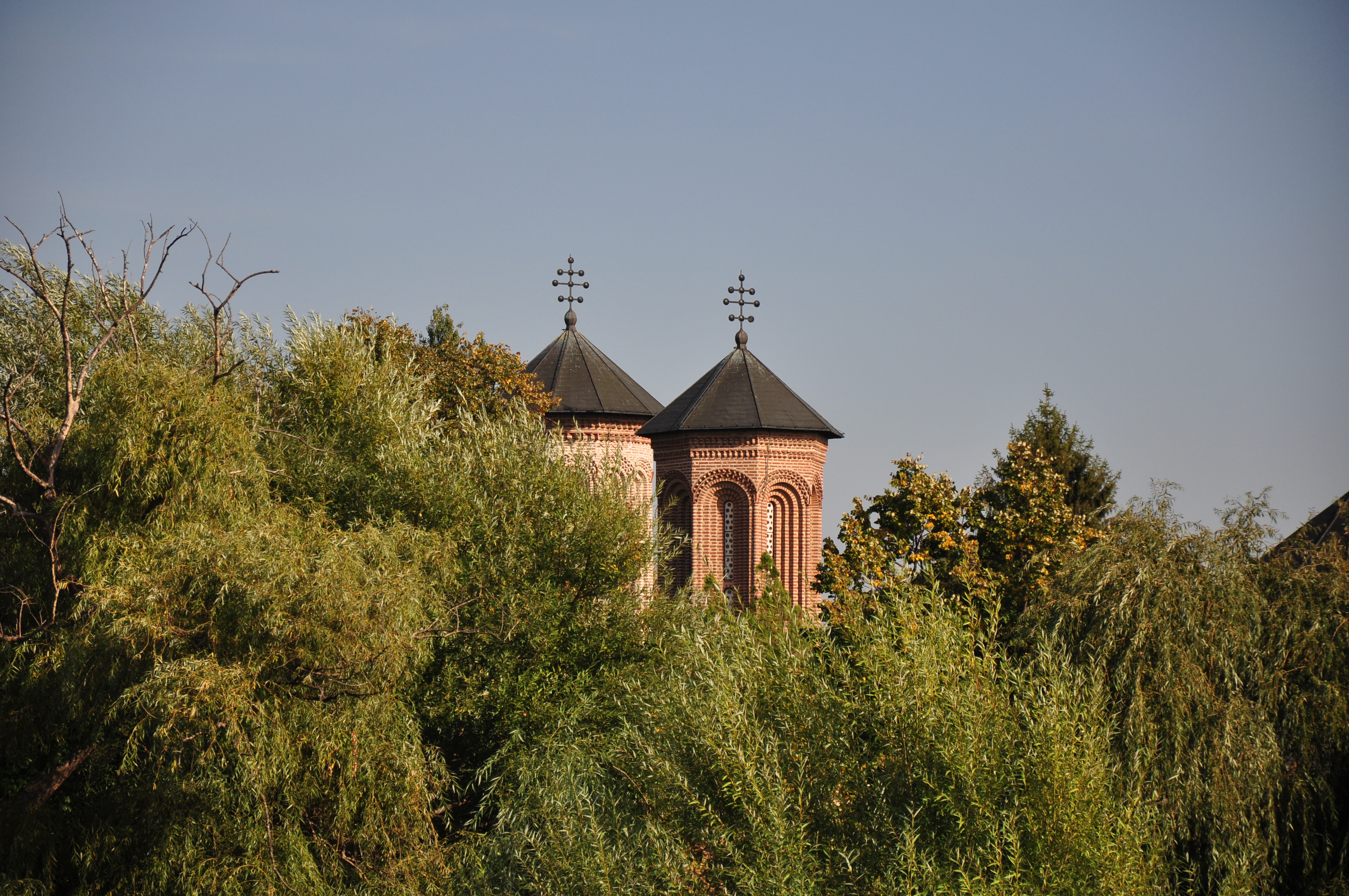
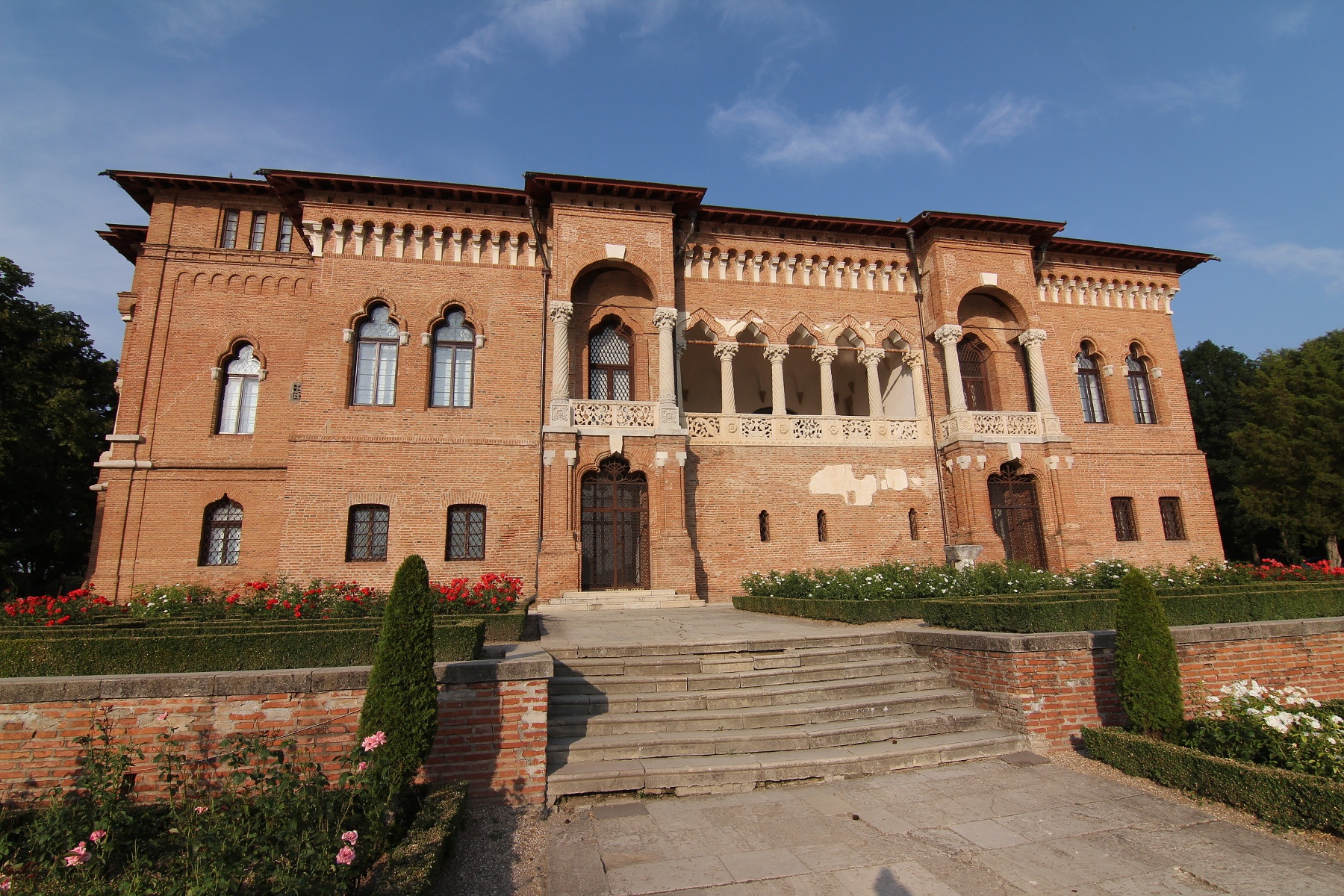
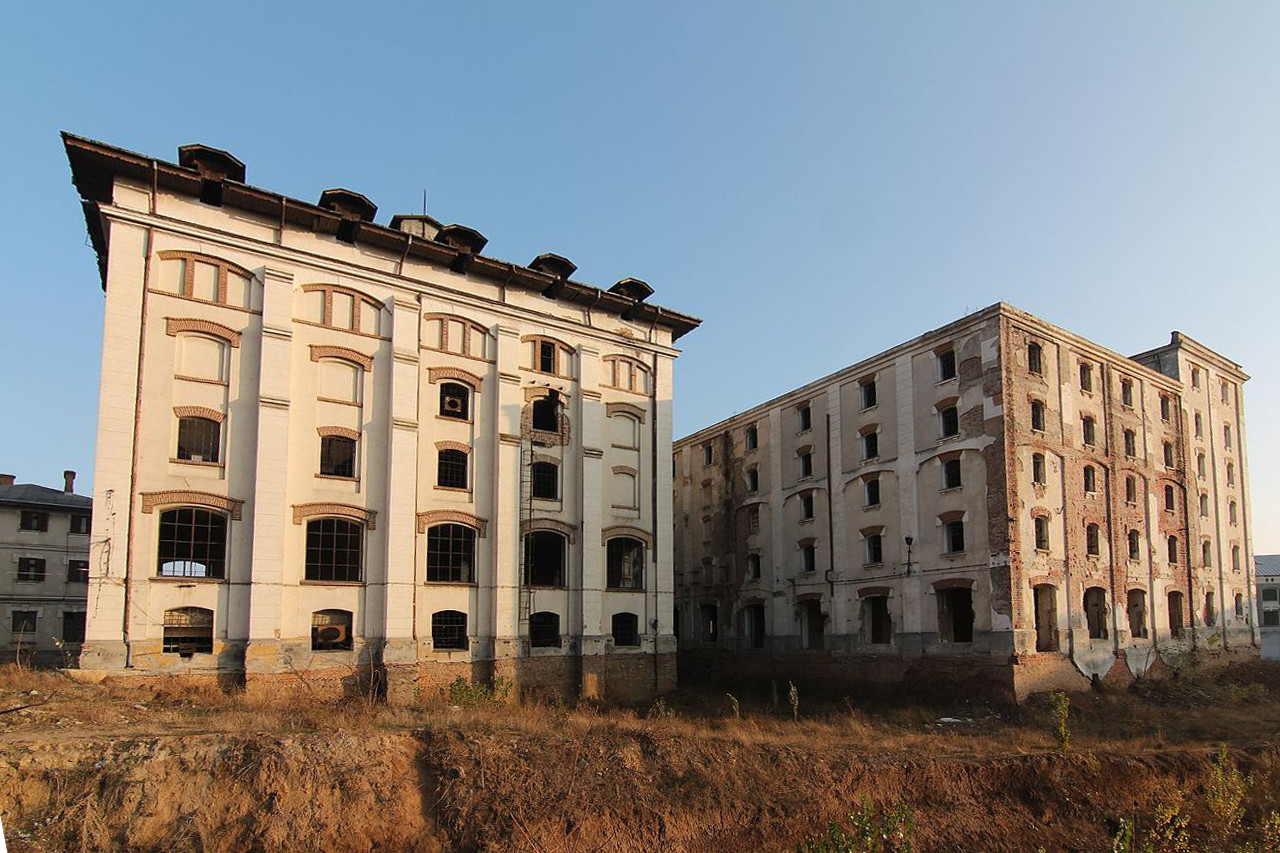
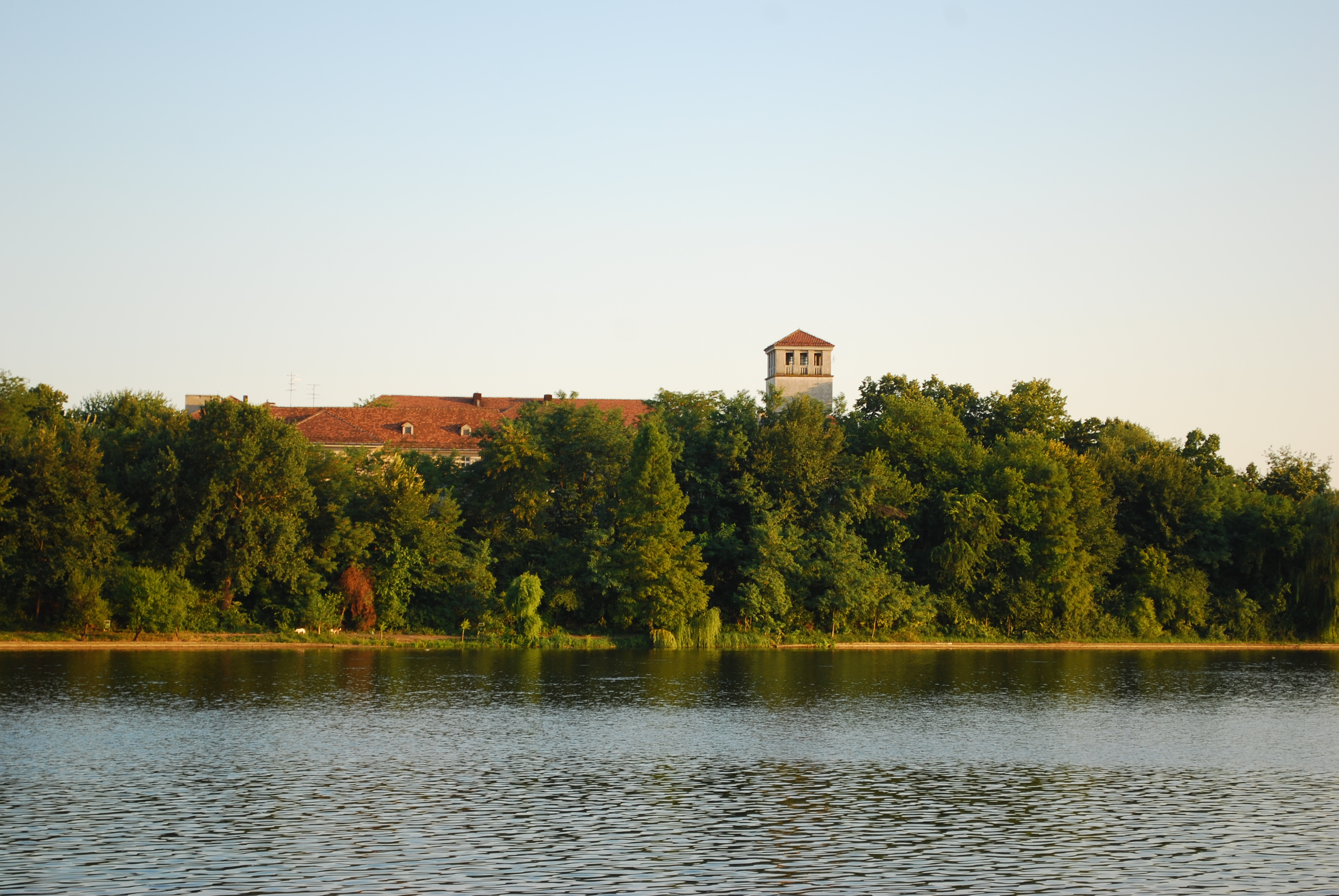
- Otopeni Airport Snagov Monastery Mogoșoaia Palace Bragadiru Pantelimon

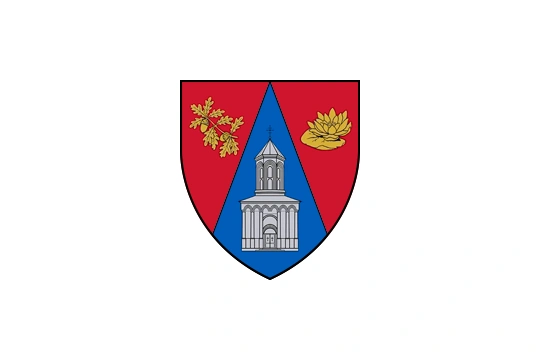
- Flag Coat of arms

- Coordinates: 44°36′N 26°7′E
- Country: Romania
- Development region: București-Ilfov
- Historical region: Muntenia
- Capital: Bucharest

Government
  - President of the County Board: Hubert Petru Ștefan Thuma (PNL)
  - Prefect: Simona Neculae

Area
  - Total: 1,583 km^{2} (611 sq mi)
  - Rank: 41st

Population (2021-12-01)
  - Total: 542,704
  - Rank: 25th
  - Density: 342.8/km^{2} (887.9/sq mi)
- Telephone code: (+40) 21 or (+40) 31
- ISO 3166 code: RO-IF
- GDP (nominal): US$ 4.775 billion (2015)
- GDP/capita: US$ 12,285 (2015)
- Website: County Council; Prefecture

Ilfov County (Romanian pronunciation: [ˈilfov]) is the county that surrounds Bucharest, the capital of Romania. It used to be largely rural, but, after the fall of communism, many of the county's villages and communes developed into high-income commuter towns, suburbs or satellites of Bucharest. The gentrification of the county is continuing, with many towns in Ilfov, such as Otopeni, having some of the highest GDP per capita levels in the country.

The county has experienced rapid demographic growth in the 21st century, being the fastest growing Romanian county between 2011 and 2021.

== Demographics ==
Ilfov County had a population of 542,686 at the 2021 Romanian census.

The population density is 342.82 per km^{2}. 40% of the population commutes and works in Bucharest, although, in recent years, many industrial plants were built outside Bucharest, in Ilfov county. It has an annual growth of about 4%.

- Romanians - 96.05%
- Others - 3.95%

Historical population
Year	Pop.	±%
1948	167,533	—
1956	196,265	+17.2%
1966	229,773	+17.1%
1977	287,738	+25.2%
1992	286,510	−0.4%
2002	300,123	+4.8%
2011	388,738	+29.5%
2021	542,686	+39.6%

== Geography ==
The county has an area of 1,584 km^{2} and it is situated in the Romanian Plain between the Argeș River and the Ialomița River. The county is the smallest by area in Romania.

The main rivers that pass through the county are: Dâmbovița River, Colentina River and Gruiu River. Several lakes can be found in Ilfov county, notably Lake Cernica, Lake Snagov and Lake Căldărușani.

=== Neighbouring counties ===
- Prahova County in the north.
- Ialomița County in the east.
- Călărași County in the southeast.
- Giurgiu County in the southwest.
- Dâmbovița County in the west.
- Bucharest as an enclave of the county.

== Economy ==
The base occupation used to be agriculture. Nowadays, due to the economical growth in Bucharest, many companies have opened their offices, production facilities or warehouses in the nearby villages, situated in the Ilfov County, thus making it the most developed county in Romania.

The predominant industries in the county are:

- Food and beverages industry
- Textile industry
- Mechanical components industry
- Chemical industry
- Paper industry
- Furniture industry
- Rubber industry
- Electrical equipment industry
- Transport equipment industry
- Electronic and optical equipment

At Otopeni there is the main aerial transport hub in Romania - the Henri Coandă International Airport. Also all the main roads and railways leaving Bucharest pass through the county.

== Tourism ==
The county has a large surface covered with forests and also due to its lakes, it is a frequent week-end and holiday destinations for the inhabitants of Bucharest.

Other notable touristic sites are:

- The Snagov Monastery
- The Cernica Monastery
- The Mogoșoaia Palace
- The Căldărușani Monastery
- The Ghica family palace in Moara Vlăsiei
- The Știrbei Palace in Buftea

== Politics ==
The Ilfov County Council, renewed at the 2024 local elections, consists of 34 counsellors, with the following party composition (the political composition indicated is that by parties, not by electoral alliances that participated in the local elections, as was the case of PSD-PNL Alliance or United Right Alliance between USR, FD and PMP):

Party	Seats	Current County Council
National Liberal Party (PNL)	14	
Social Democratic Party (PSD)	8	
Alliance for the Union of Romanians (AUR)	5	
Save Romania Union (USR)	4	
Force of the Right (FD)	2	
People's Movement Party (PMP)	1	

== History ==
Most of today's Ilfov County used to be covered by Codrii Vlăsiei, a thick forest, but there were several Dacian settlements, most important being Argedava, on the right bank of the Argeș River in what is now Popești, which was the capital of king Burebista.

The thick forests were useful for retreat during the Migration Age because they were not easy to cross on horseback. In fact, the name of the forest means "the Forests of the Vlachs", a name given by the Slavs who inhabited the nearby plains.

The county was named after the Ilfov River and it appears for the first time in a 1482 donation act of voivode Vlad Călugărul to the monastery of Snagov. In earliest documents, it was known as Elhov. The name is of Slavic origin (еlьха, alder; -ov, possessive suffix), referring to a river which flowed through an alder forest.

== Administrative divisions ==
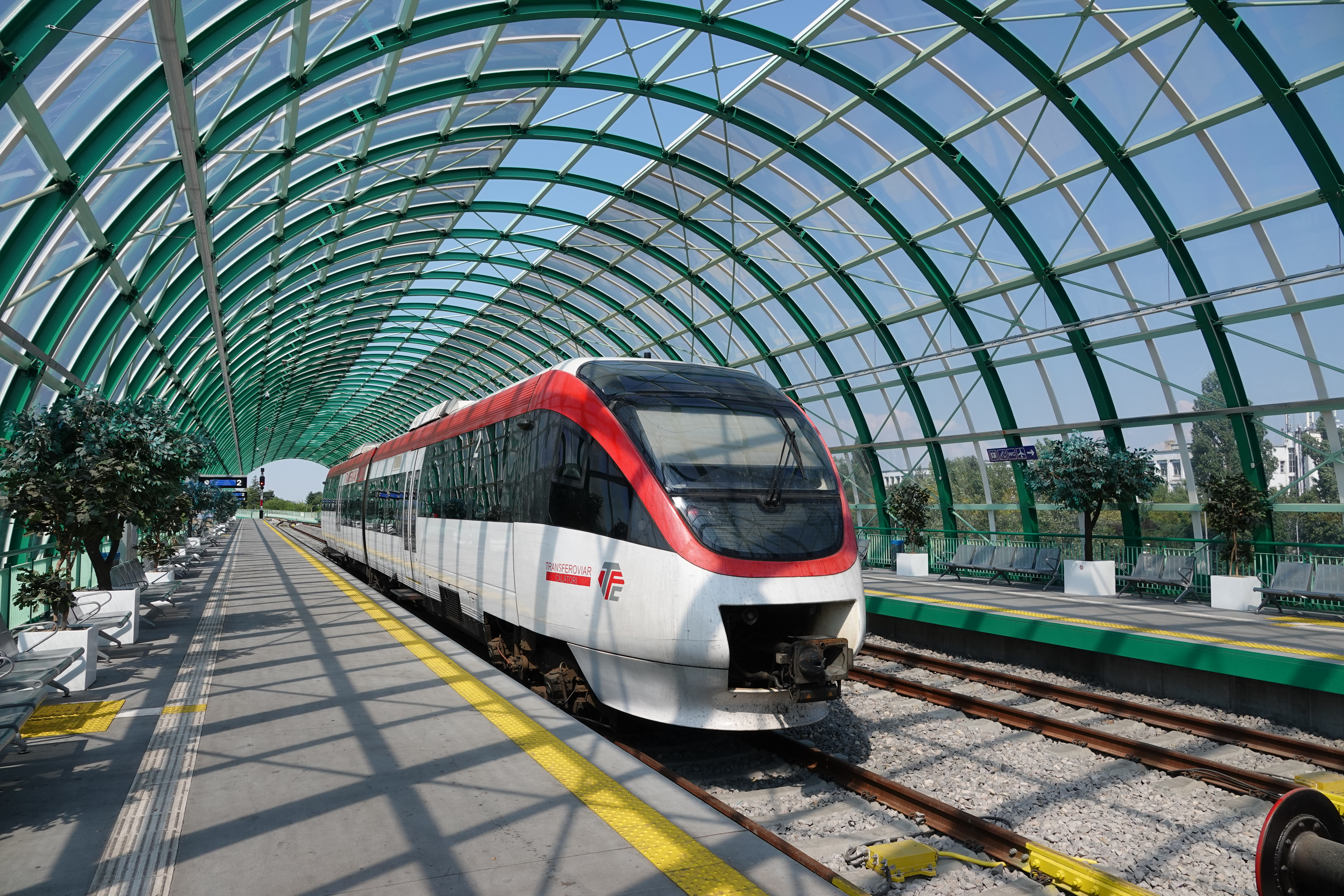
Otopeni Airport Station

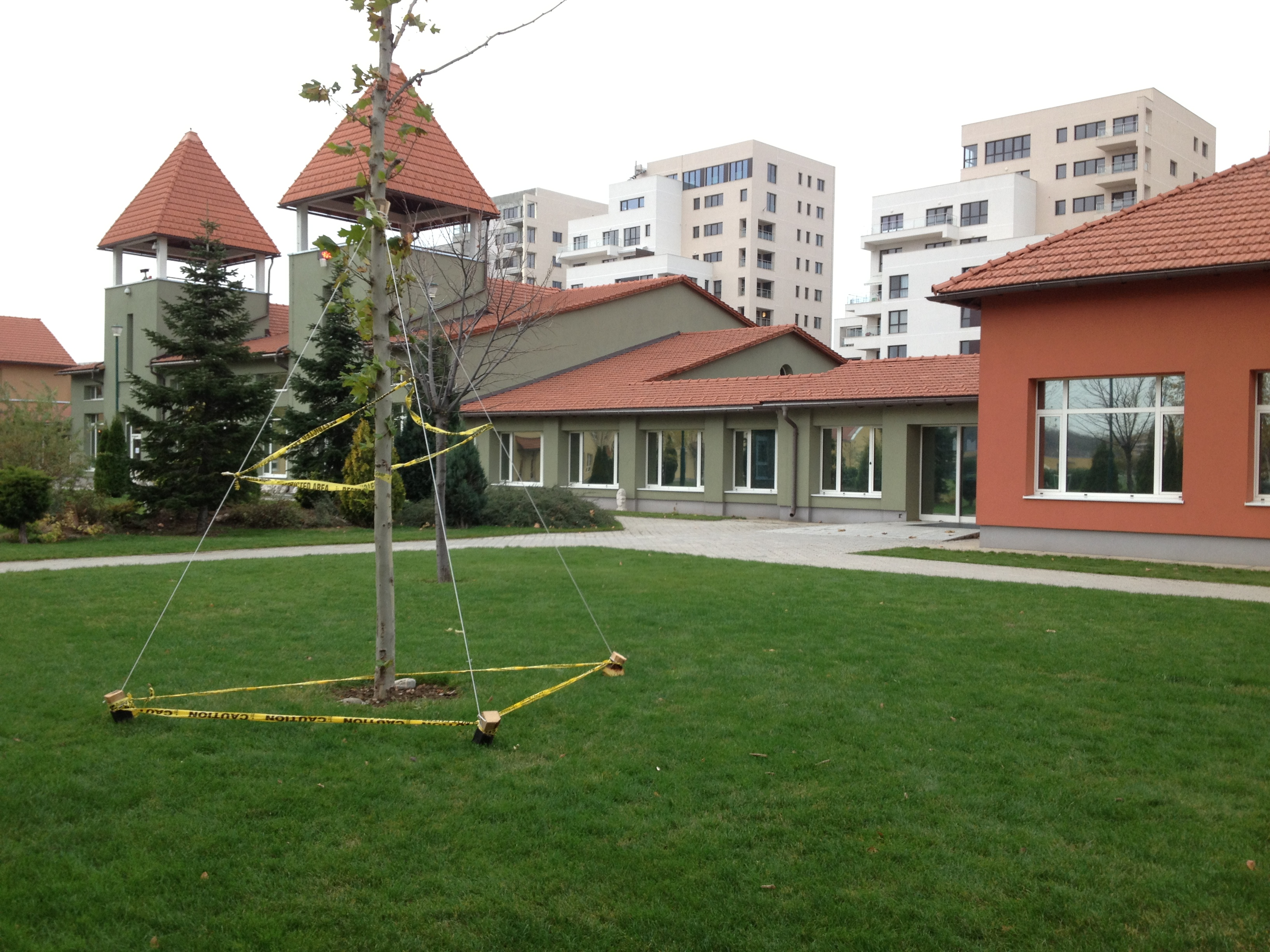
American International School of Bucharest, located in Voluntari

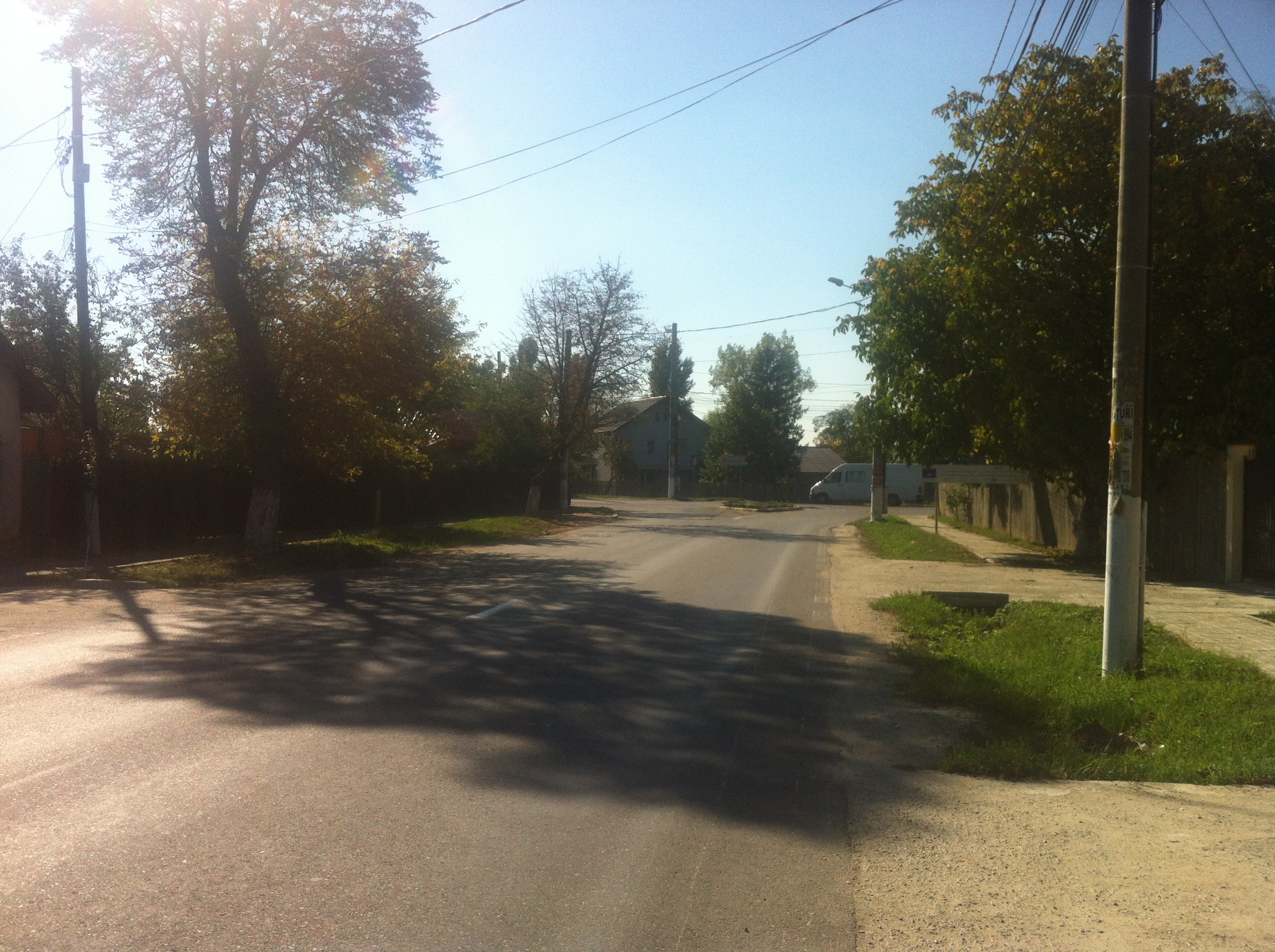
Buftea

The county has 8 towns and 32 communes. The largest settlements by population are Popești-Leordeni, Voluntari, Chiajna, Bragadiru, Pantelimon, Buftea, Otopeni. These are the only settlements with more than 20,000 residents. Unlike most other areas of Romania, the population in Ilfov County is increasing, as many of the settlements here are seen as suburbs of Bucharest and are increasingly attracting upper-class families. At the 2022 census, 45.19% of the county's population was defined as urban.

Popești-Leordeni is the largest settlement in Ilfov county, with a population of 53,431 at the 2021 census (representing an increase of 31,536 people since 2011, this being the largest population increase of any settlement in Romania between 2011 and 2021).

Voluntari is the second largest settlement, with a population of 47,366 at the 2021 census. It has experienced rapid population growth in recent years. There were serious debates about the city level being awarded to Voluntari in 2004, as it is alleged that it was given in regard to the city's political affiliation, rather than population, development or any other objective features. Despite this, Voluntari did have a population of 30,000 at that time, and many other localities with this population have been given city status in the past.

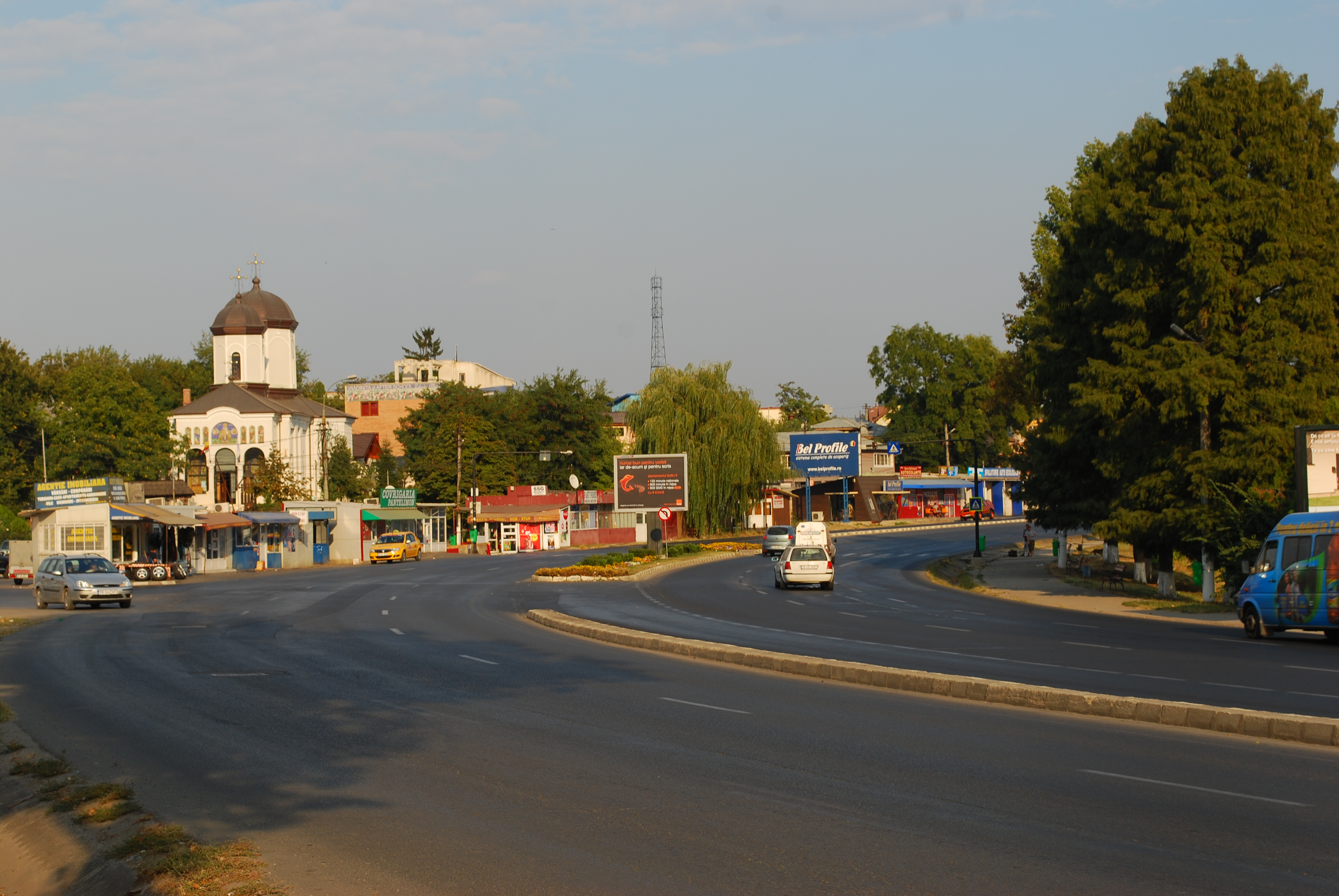
DN3 in Pantelimon

Chiajna is the third largest settlement in Ilfov county, and one of the fastest growing localities in Romania, with its population having increased from 29,329 people in 2011 to 43,588 people in 2022, according to the Romanian population census.

Buftea is associated with the cinema of Romania; as the film studios MediaPro Pictures are located in Buftea.

Otopeni was transformed into a town under the communist regime, as part of Nicolae Ceaușescu's systematisation policy, with semidetached houses being replaced by four-storey blocks of flats.

Before 1972, Ilfov County used to be one of the largest counties of Romania, but parts of it were added to neighbouring counties and nowadays it is the smallest (excluding the city of Bucharest, which has special status). Between 1981 and 1997, it was called "Sectorul Agricol Ilfov" and it was not a separate county, but subordinate to the capital.

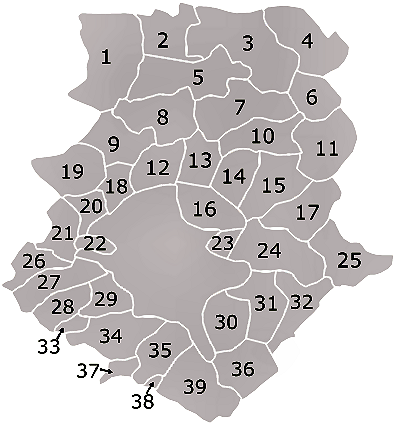
Ilfov communes

1. Periș
2. Ciolpani
3. Gruiu
4. Nuci
5. Snagov
6. Grădiștea
7. Moara Vlăsiei
8. Balotești
9. Corbeanca
10. Dascălu
11. Petrăchioaia
12. Otopeni (town status)
13. Tunari
14. Ștefăneștii de Jos
15. Afumați
16. Voluntari (town status)
17. Găneasa
18. Mogoșoaia
19. Buftea (town status)
20. Chitila (town status)
21. Dragomirești-Vale
22. Chiajna
23. Dobroești
24. Pantelimon (town status)
25. Brănești
26. Ciorogârla
27. Domnești
28. Clinceni
29. Bragadiru (town status)
30. Popești-Leordeni (town status)
31. Glina
32. Cernica
33. Cornetu
34. Măgurele (town status)
35. Jilava
36. Berceni
37. Dărăști-Ilfov
38. 1 Decembrie
39. Vidra

Ilfov County is the only county that has its capital outside of its territorial area, in Bucharest, which is not part of the actual county. Initially, right after the 1968 reform of the public administration in communist Romania, Ilfov was a larger county, that comprised its present-day territory, the entire Giurgiu County, Bucharest and the western parts of Călărași and Ialomița counties. Later during the communist period, its territory was reduced to its current size and it became one of the sectors of Bucharest. It became again a county in 1997, when its capital was designated to be Bucharest. However, in 2005, some plans were proposed that would merge Bucharest with 90 other communes located to up to 40 km outside the city, in Ilfov County and other nearby counties into a "metropolitan area" of Bucharest, similar to Greater London. As of 2011, these plans did not happen, while a debate on the general administrative division of Romania was under way.

== Historical county ==
Județul Ilfov
- County (Județ)
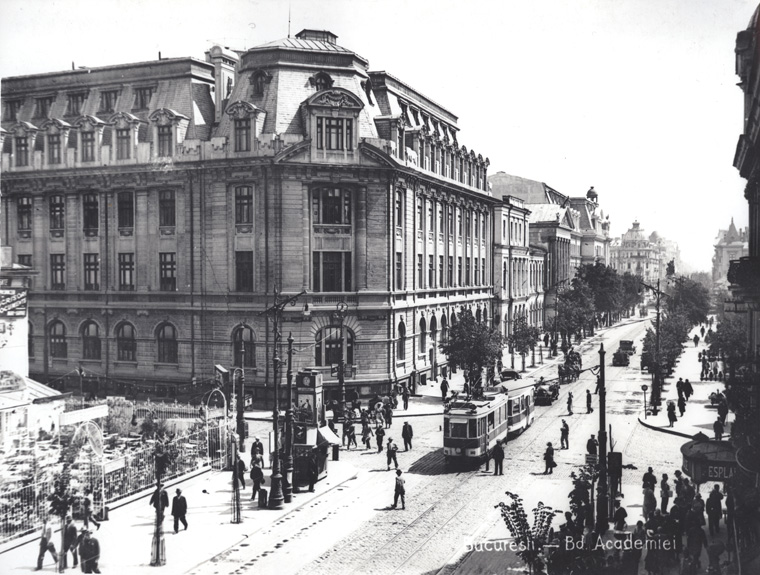
- View of the center of Bucharest in 1928. Bucharest was the capital of the Kingdom of Romania and of Ilfov County in the interwar period.

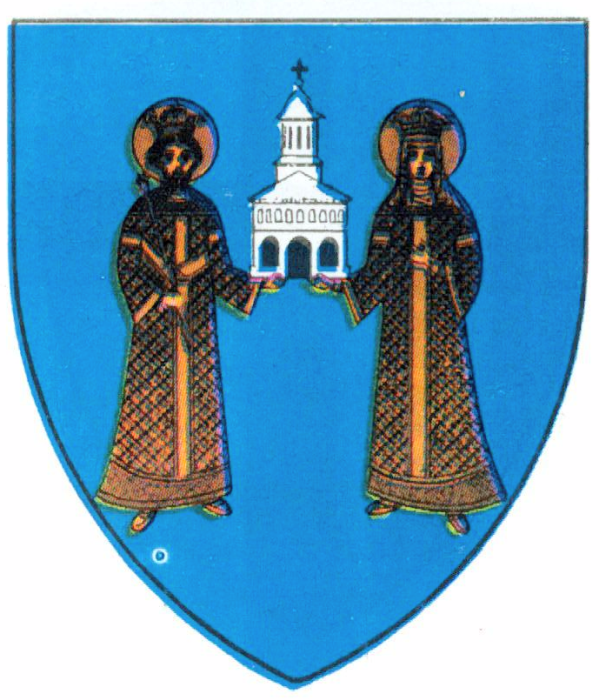
- Coat of arms

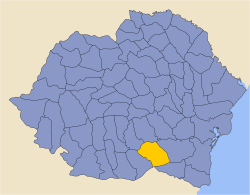
- Country: Romania
- Historic region: Muntenia
- Capital city (Reședință de județ): Bucharest (Romanian: București)

Area
  - Total: 5,176 km^{2} (1,998 sq mi)

Population (1930)
  - Total: 999,562
  - Density: 193.1/km^{2} (500.2/sq mi)
- Time zone: UTC+2 (EET)
  - Summer (DST): UTC+3 (EEST)

Historically, the county was located in the southern part of Greater Romania, in the southern part of the historical region of Muntenia, around and in the south of Bucharest. During the interwar years, the county, which contained the city of Bucharest, was the most populous county in Romania. Currently the territory of the county is divided among Bucharest, the current Ilfov County, Dâmbovița County, Ialomița County, Călărași County, and Giurgiu County. It was bordered to the north by the counties of Prahova and Dâmboviţa, to the west by Vlașca County, to the east by Ialomița County, and to the south by Durostor County.

=== Administration ===
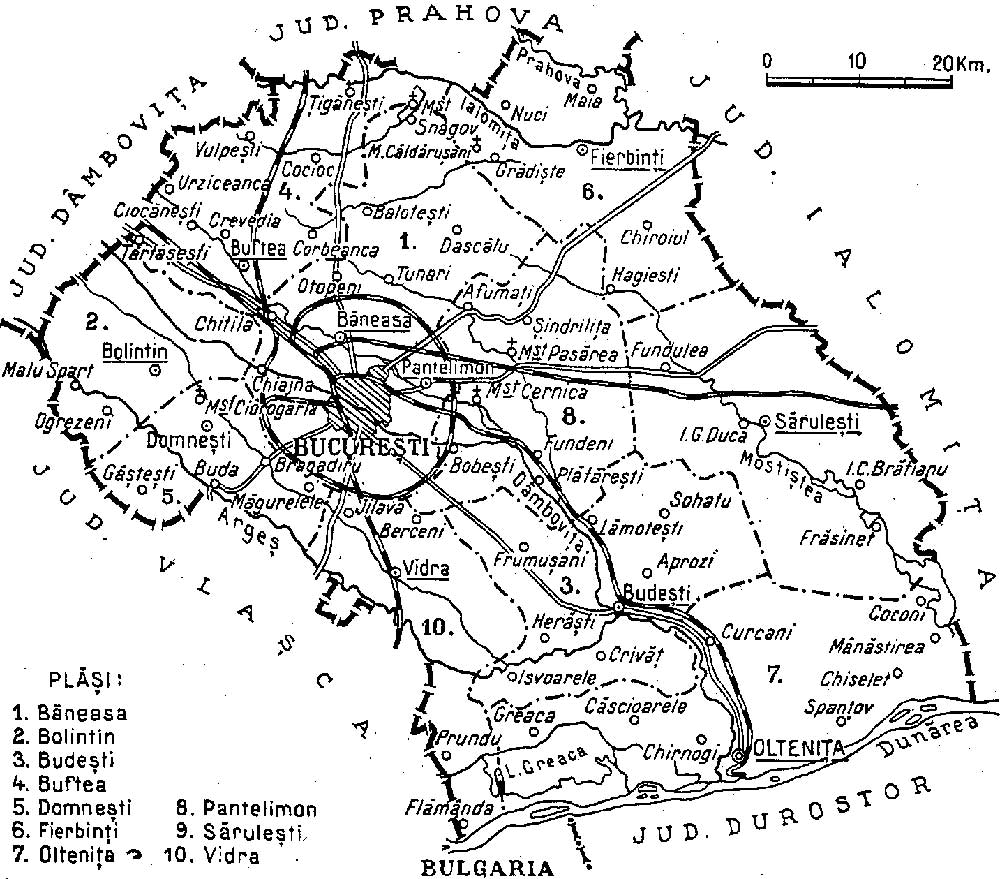
Map of Ilfov County as constituted in 1938.

The county included the cities of Bucharest and Oltenița, and originally seven administrative districts (plăși):

1. Plasa Băneasa, headquartered at Băneasa (with 39 villages)
2. Plasa Bolintin, headquartered at Bolintin (with 38 villages)
3. Plasa Budești, headquartered at Budești (with 31 villages)
4. Plasa Fierbinți, headquartered at Fierbinți (with 51 villages)
5. Plasa Oltenița, headquartered at Oltenița (with 25 villages)
6. Plasa Sărulești, headquartered at Sărulești (with 54 villages)
7. Plasa Vidra, headquartered at Vidra (with 28 villages)

Subsequently, the county established three more districts:

8. Plasa Buftea, headquartered at Buftea (with 50 villages)
9. Plasa Domnești, headquartered at Domnești (with 44 villages)
10. Plasa Pantelimon, headquartered at Pantelimon (with 43 villages)

=== Population ===
According to the 1930 census data, the county population was 999,562 inhabitants, ethnically divided as follows: 84.3% Romanians, 7.0% Jews, 2.5% Hungarians, 1.7% Romanies, 1.5% Germans, as well as other minorities. From the religious point of view, the population was 84.5% Eastern Orthodox, 7.7% Jewish, 3.7% Roman Catholic, 1.3% Greek Catholic, 1.2% Lutheran, as well as other minorities.

==== Urban population ====
In 1930, the county's urban population was 649,429 inhabitants, comprising 77.7% Romanians, 10.8% Jews, 3.7% Hungarians, 2.2% Germans, 1.2% Romanis, as well as other minorities. From the religious point of view, the urban population was composed of 76.4% Eastern Orthodox, 11.8% Jewish, 5.6% Roman Catholic, 2.0% Greek Catholic, 1.9% Lutheran, 1.1% Reformed, as well as other minorities.
