= Găneasa, Ilfov =

Găneasa
- Commune
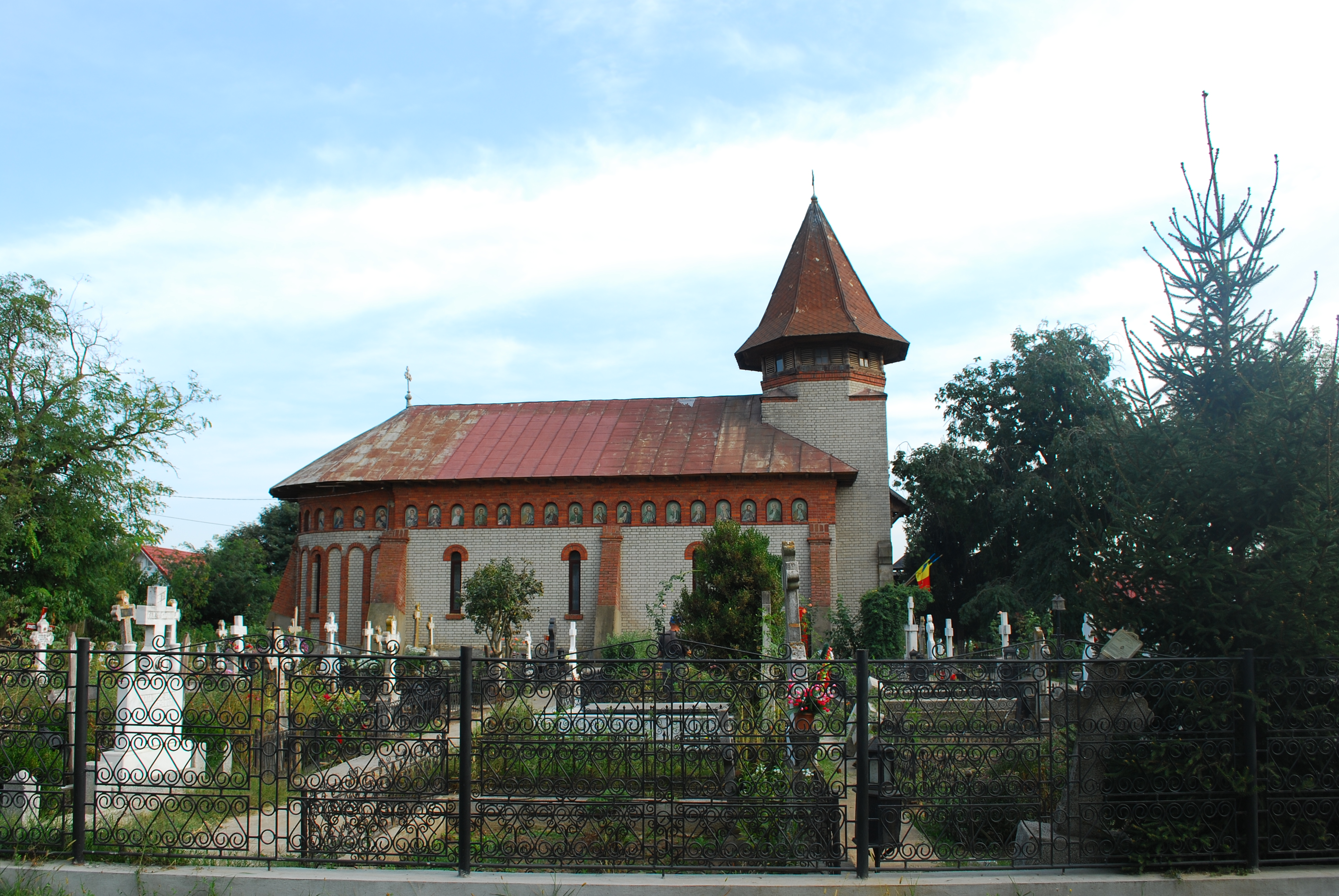
- Saint Nicholas Church in Moara Domnească

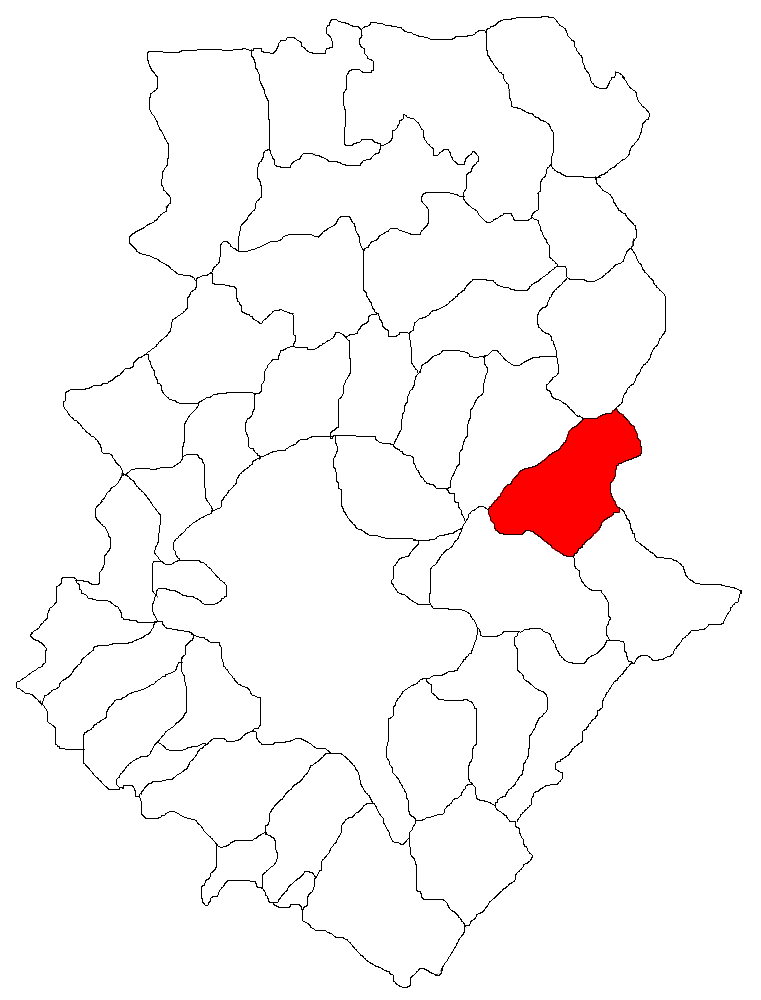
- Location in Ilfov County

- Location in Romania
- Coordinates: 44°30′N 26°16′E
- Country: Romania
- County: Ilfov

Government
  - Mayor (2021–2024): Raul-Gabriel Niculae (PNL)
- Area: 46 km^{2} (18 sq mi)
- Elevation: 75 m (246 ft)
- Population (2021-12-01): 5,402
  - Density: 120/km^{2} (300/sq mi)
- Time zone: UTC+02:00 (EET)
  - Summer (DST): UTC+03:00 (EEST)
- Postal code: 077100
- Area code: +(40) 21
- Vehicle reg.: IF
- Website: primariaganeasailfov.ro

Găneasa is a commune in the east of Ilfov County, Muntenia, Romania. Its name is a feminine form of Gane, a Romanian name. It is composed of five villages: Cozieni, Găneasa, Moara Domnească, Piteasca, and Șindrilița.

Historical population
Year	Pop.	±%
2002	4,206	—
2011	4,963	+18.0%
2021	5,402	+8.8%
Source: Census data

== Natives ==
- Radu Aldulescu (1922–2006), cellist
