= Balotești =

- Commune
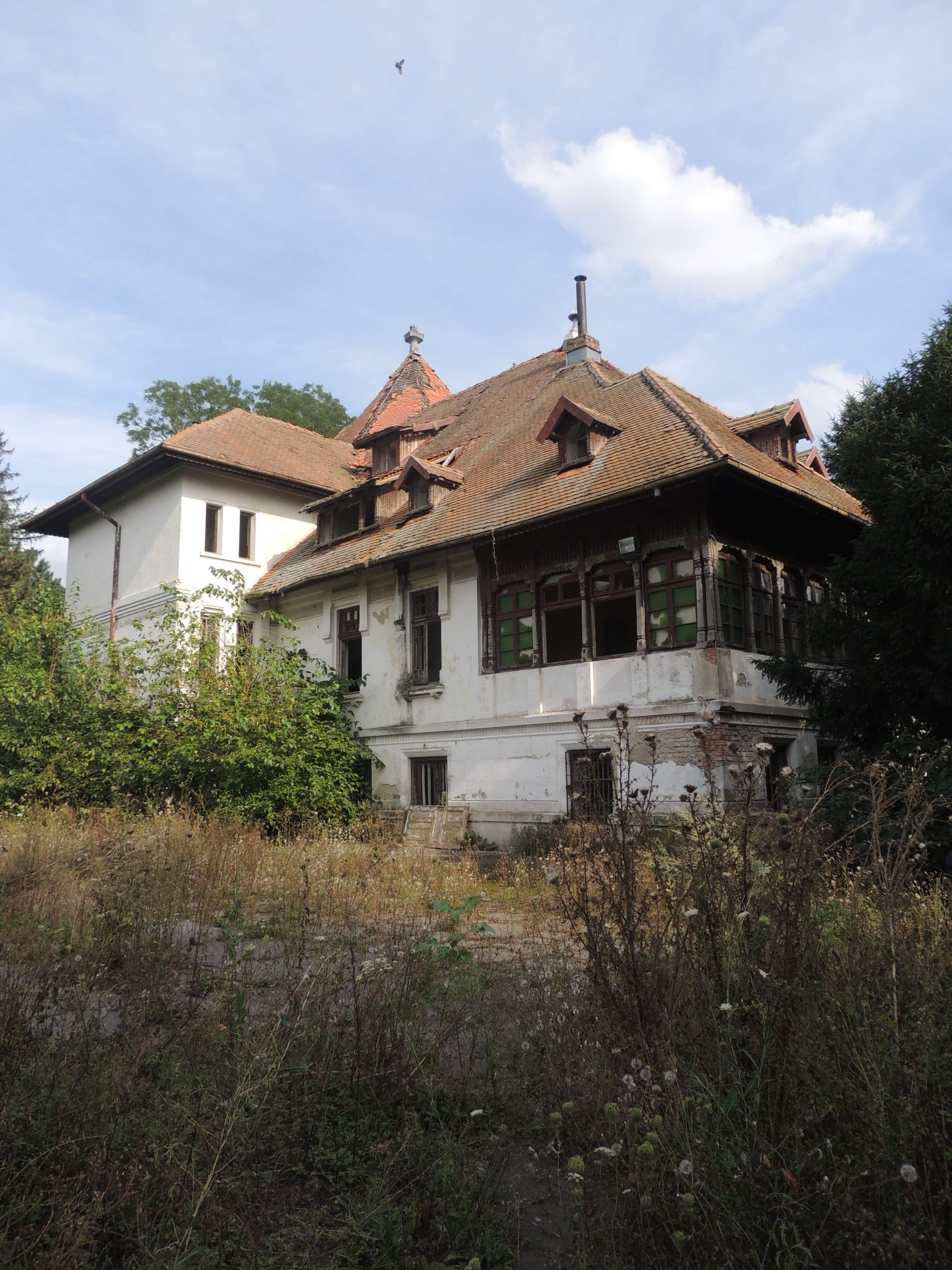
- Niculescu-Bujoiu mansion

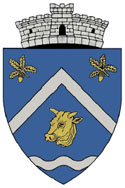
- Coat of arms

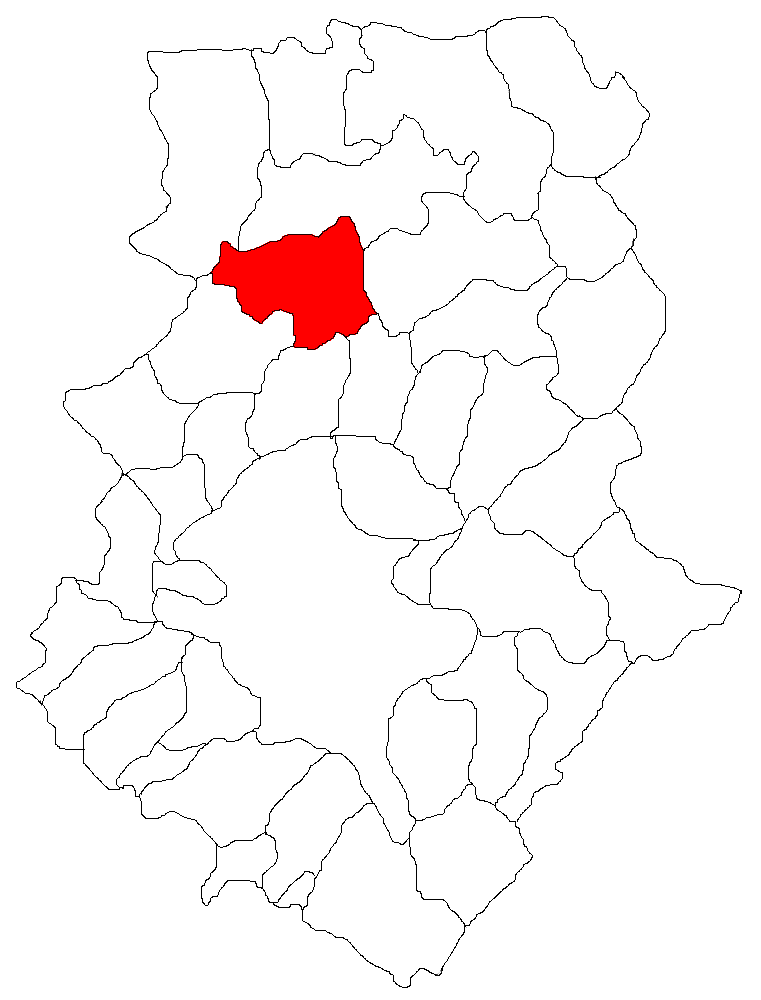
- Location in Ilfov County

- Location in Romania
- Coordinates: 44°37′N 26°6′E
- Country: Romania
- County: Ilfov

Government
  - Mayor (2024–2028): Cristian-Ștefan Pretorian (PSD)
- Area: 53 km^{2} (20 sq mi)
- Elevation: 92 m (302 ft)
- Population (2021-12-01): 11,210
  - Density: 210/km^{2} (550/sq mi)
- Time zone: UTC+02:00 (EET)
  - Summer (DST): UTC+03:00 (EEST)
- Postal code: 077015
- Area code: +40x1
- Vehicle reg.: IF
- Website: primariabalotesti.ro

Balotești is a commune in the northwestern part of Ilfov County, Muntenia, Romania. Two small rivers flow through this location: Cociovaliștea and Vlăsia. It is composed of three villages: Balotești, Dumbrăveni, and Săftica.

== Geography ==
The commune is situated on the banks of the Cociovaliștea river. The settlements are located mainly on the right bank of the river with uninhabited territory on the right bank of the Vlăsia river, the tributary of Cociovaliștea.

It is traversed by the DN1 national road, which connects Bucharest to Ploiești. In the village of Balotești, this road intersects with county road DJ101, which leads west to Corbeanca and Buftea, and east to Moara Vlăsiei, Grădiștea, and further into Ialomița County. The DJ200B road starts from DN1 at Săftica, intersects with DJ101 at Balotești and leads south to Tunari, Voluntari and Bucharest (Pipera).

== Demography ==
Historical population
Year	Pop.	±%
2002	6,726	—
2011	8,314	+23.6%
2021	11,210	+34.8%
Source: Census data

According to the 2021 Romanian census, the population of the commune numbers 11,210 people. The inhabitants are a majority Romanians (83.75%), with a Romani minority (2.34%) and another 13.08% of unknown ethnicity. By religion, the inhabitants are 81.06% Orthodox and 14.97% of an unknown affiliation.

There are two churches in the commune:

- Assumption of Our Lady Church, Balotești
- Saint Nicholas, Theodor and Stylianos Church

== History ==
Through archeological digs, it was determined that the area of the present commune had been inhabited since the Neolithic. The first record attesting Balotești comes from 12 February 1612, when Voivode Radu Șerban confirmed the estate ownership of the village of Balotești to Postelnic Ivașcu, son of Vent from Balotești. The name of the village and the present-day commune comes from a boyar, Balotă or Bolotă, who owned the local lands.

The Saint Nicholas, Theodor and Stylianos Church from the village of Balotești was built in 1763 by the Greek boyar Zamfirache and his wife Elena. In 1870, a school was built with help from the Lahovary family in the village of Dumbrăveni, which was part of the commune of Balotești.

At the end of the 19th century, the commune was part of Plasa Snagov, Ilfov County. It had the villages of Balotești, Cacaleți, Preoțești, Popești-Petrești and Săftica, totalling 891 inhabitants. In the commune there was a mixed school, a steam threshing machine and 5 Orthodox churches (one for each Cătun). By 1925, the commune was part of Plasa Băneasa and had 1,329 inhabitants.

In 1950, the commune was assigned to the Căciulați Raion. In 1968, it became a part of the re-established Ilfov County, and in 1981 it was part of the Ilfov Agricultural Sector from the municipality of Bucharest. In 1998, the Agricultural Sector became the current Ilfov County.

On 31 March 1995, TAROM Flight 371, operated by an Airbus A310, crashed near Balotești, killing all 60 people on board. It was thus the deadliest aircraft accident in Romanian history.

Stadionul Central, opened in 2010, is a multi-use stadium in the commune; it is used mostly for football matches and is the home ground of CS Balotești. The commune is also the location of the thermal water park "Therme București", the largest of its kind in Europe. The park opened in 2016.

== Air Force Command ==
In 1982, the Command Point of the Air Defense Command was established in the Balotești barracks. In 1993, the Central Command Point of the General Staff of Aviation and Air Defense succeeded the previous Command Point. The unit changed its name to the Central Air Operational Command in December 2000. After Romania joined NATO in 2004, the Air Operational Command was integrated into the NATO Integrated Air Defense System.

In 2008, the structure was split between the Air Operational Component, and the Air Operations Centre of the Romanian Air Force which currently reports to the Combined Air Operations Centre from Torrejón. The Air Operational Component received the honorific name "General comandant aviator Ermil Gheorghiu" in 2018, and in 2021 it was renamed to the Air Component Command.

Between 14 March to 30 April 2008, the headquarters of the United States Air Force's 323d Air Expeditionary Wing also functioned in Balotești during the deployment of USAF units in support of the air policing missions for the 2008 Bucharest summit.

== Natives ==
- Marian Zidaru (born 1956), painter and sculptor
