= Dumitrescu =

Dumitrescu is a Romanian surname. Notable people with the surname include:

- Alexandru Dumitrescu (born 1988), Romanian sprint canoer
- Catrinel Dumitrescu (born 1956), Romanian actress
- Constantin Dumitrescu (boxer) (born 1931)
- Constantin Dumitrescu (general) (1868–1935)
- Constantin Ticu Dumitrescu (1928–2008), Romanian politician
- Cristian Dumitrescu (born 1955), Romanian politician
- Daniel Dumitrescu (born 1968), Romanian boxer
- Geo Dumitrescu (1920–2004), Romanian poet and journalist
- George Dumitrescu (1901–1972), Romanian poet
- George Dorul Dumitrescu (1901 or 1904–1985), Romanian prose writer
- Iancu Dumitrescu (born 1944), Romanian avant-garde composer
- Ilie Dumitrescu (born 1969), Romanian football player
- Ion Dumitrescu (1925–1999), Romanian sports shooter and Olympic champion
- Liana Dumitrescu (1973–2011), Romanian politician
- Marilena Dumitrescu (born 1964), Romanian politician
- Nelu Dumitrescu, Romanian drummer
- Natalia Dumitrescu, Romanian abstract painter
- Petre Dumitrescu (1882–1950), Romanian general
- Puiu Dumitrescu, Romanian royal secretary
- Răzvan Dumitrescu, Romanian journalist
- Ruxandra Dumitrescu, Romanian volleyball player
- Sava Dumitrescu, Romanian pharmacologist and professor
- Vasile Dumitrescu, Romanian bobsledder
- Victor Dumitrescu (1924–1997), Romanian soccer player
- Zamfir Dumitrescu (1946–2021), Romanian painter
- Zoe Dumitrescu-Bușulenga, Romanian literary critic and philosopher

== See also ==
- Demetrescu
- Dimitrescu
- Dumitru
- Dumitreni (disambiguation)
