= Dumitru =

Dumitru is a Romanian surname and given name. Notable people with the surname include:

- Alina Alexandra Dumitru (born 1982), Romanian judoka
- Alexe Dumitru (1935–1971), Romanian sprint canoer
- Ion Dumitru (born 1950), Romanian footballer
- Jonathan Dumitru (born 1970), American Politician
- Nicolao Dumitru (born 1991), Italian footballer
- Ted Dumitru (1939–2016), Romanian football manager

Notable people with the given name include:

- Dumitru Bâșcu (1902–1983), Romanian painter
- Dumitru Berciu (1907–1998), Romanian historian and archaeologist
- Dumitru Caracostea (1879–1964), Romanian folklorist, literary historian, and critic
- Dumitru Carlaonț (1888–1970), Romanian general
- Dumitru Ciotti (1882/1885–1974), Megleno-Romanian activist, editor and schoolteacher
- Dumitru Corbea (1910–2002), Romanian writer
- Dumitru Cornilescu (1891–1975), Romanian theologian
- Dumitru Găleșanu (born 1955), Romanian writer, poet, philosopher, illustrator and jurist
- Dumitru Karnabatt (1877–1949), Romanian poet, art critic, and political journalist
- Dumitru C. Moruzi (1850–1914), Moldavian-born Russian and Romanian aristocrat, civil servant, and writer
- Dumitru Moțpan (1940–2018), Moldovan politician
- Dumitru Pasima (1935–2022), Romanian Aromanian sculptor
- Dumitru Popovici (1902–1952), Romanian literary historian
- Dumitru Sigmirean (1959–2013), Romanian footballer
- Dumitru Stăniloae (1903–1993), Romanian Orthodox Christian priest, theologian and professor

== See also ==
- Dumitriu (surname)
- Dumitreni (disambiguation)
- Dumitrescu (surname)
- Dumitra, name of several villages in Romania
- Dumitrești, name of several villages in Romania
- Dumitreștii, name of several villages in Romania
