= St. Nicholas Church, Bălteni =

Saint Nicholas Church
- Saint Nicholas Church of the former Bălteni Skete
- Biserica "Sf. Nicolae"
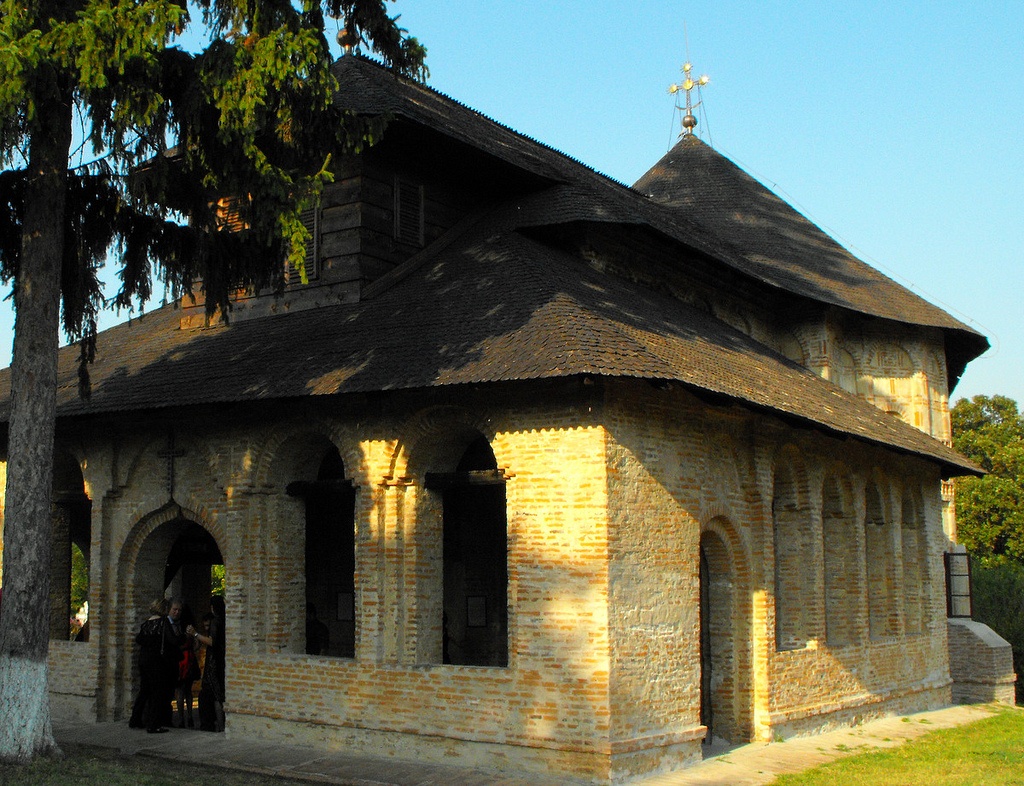
- Saint Nicholas Church in 2011
- Saint Nicholas Church
- Location: Saint Nicholas St 12, Bălteni, Periș
- Country: Romania
- Denomination: Eastern Orthodox

History
- Founded: 13th-14th century (original church); 1626 (current church)
- Founder: Hrizea Coconu (current church)

Architecture
- Architectural type: Byzantine

Specifications
- Materials: Bricks, stone and wood

Administration
- Archdiocese: Bucharest
- Parish: Bălteni Cocioc

Clergy
- Archbishop: Patriarch Daniel

The Saint Nicholas Church (Romanian: Biserica "Sf. Nicolae"), formerly part of the Bălteni Skete, is a historic Orthodox church located in the south of Romania, in the county of Ilfov, belonging to the village of Bălteni. The current church's origins trace back to the early 17th century, with a significant reconstruction undertaken by Hrizea Vornicul, a high-ranking official in the Wallachian court. An inscription above the entrance to the narthex confirms his patronage and the church's dedication to Saint Nicholas.

The church's architectural style reflects the traditional Orthodox design prevalent during that era, characterized by its distinct division into the narthex, naos, and altar. This layout not only served liturgical functions but also symbolized the spiritual journey of the faithful. Situated in proximity to other significant monastic establishments like the Snagov Monastery, the Saint Nicholas Church played a vital role in the spiritual life of the region. Its location within Codrii Vlăsiei provided both seclusion and a strategic position for monastic activities.

Over the centuries, the church has witnessed periods of decline and restoration, reflecting the broader historical and political shifts in the region. Recognized for its historical value, the church was designated as a historic monument in 1955.

== History ==
=== Older church ===
According to oral tradition and architectural analysis, the origins of the Saint Nicholas Church predate its documented reconstruction in 1626 by Hrizea Vornicul. Folklore attributes the original founding of the monastic site to Radu Negru, a legendary voivode considered one of the founders of Wallachia. The tradition recounts that during a military campaign against Tatar invaders, Radu Negru became lost in the vast and swampy Codrii Vlăsiei. In a dream, God commanded him to build a church at that very spot should he emerge victorious. After defeating the Tatars, Radu Negru fulfilled the divine command by raising a monastic settlement at Bălteni.

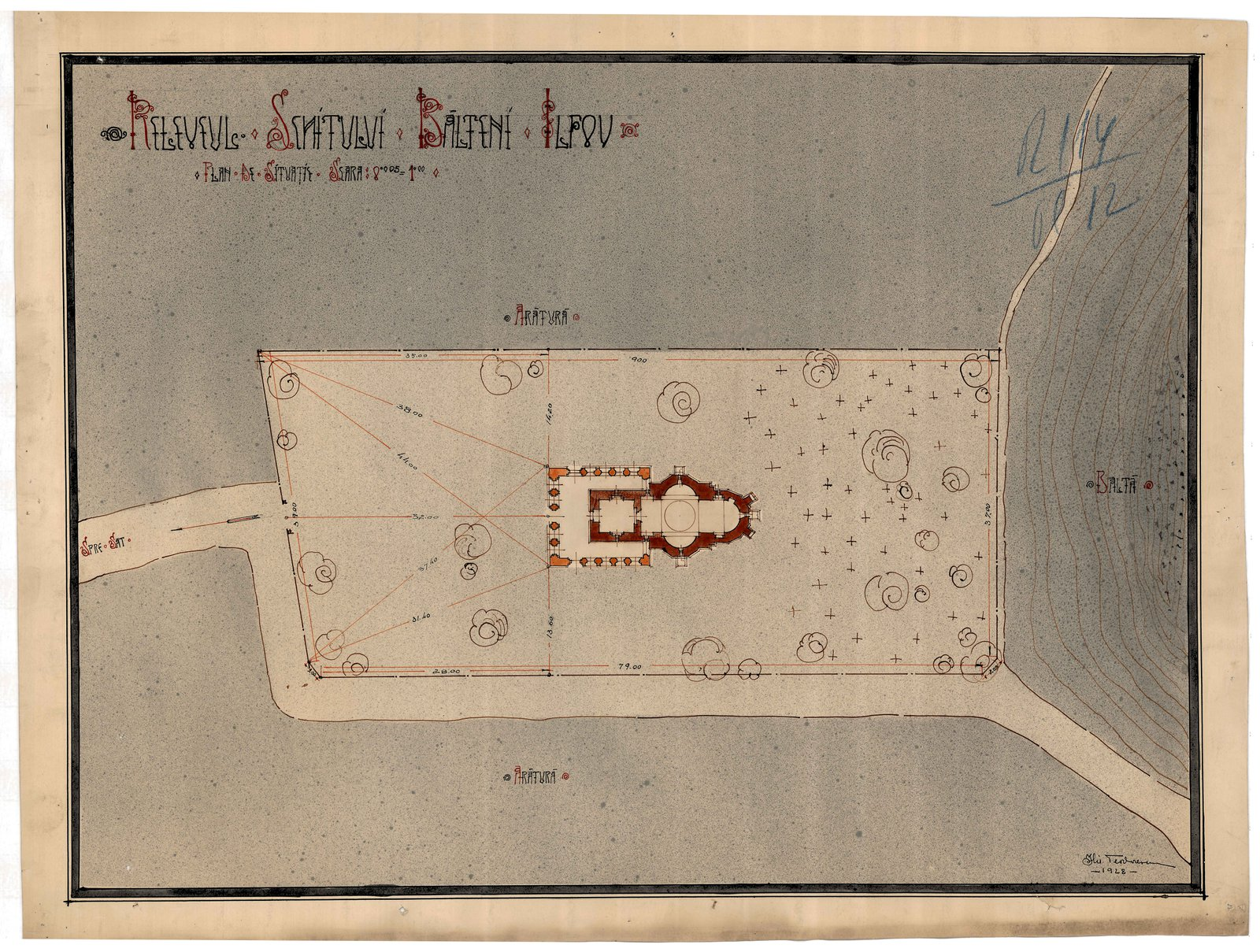
The monastic site complex in 1928

This foundation legend, passed down through generations and preserved in ballads by the villagers, also links the foundation of nearby Snagov Monastery to one of Radu Negru's sons, most likely Mircea the Elder. In support of this, a Polish traveler, Matei Strycowsky, claimed in 1574 to have seen a church near Gherghița, built on the site of a battle between Basarab I of Wallachia and Hungarian King Charles I, a battle many associate with the founding of sacred sites like Bălteni.

Though no direct documentary evidence survives from the 14th century to confirm the initial construction, the church's distinct architectural plan, notably similar to that of Cozia Monastery, suggests a much earlier origin. The inner structure deviates significantly from the ecclesiastical norms of the 16th and 17th centuries, reinforcing the claim that the original edifice dates back to the 14th century or earlier. Further credence is given by a 16th-century Slavonic document from voivode Vlad Vintilă de la Slatina, which records the death of an unnamed voivode in the village of Bălteni, thereby confirming the locality's significance at least by the early 1500s.

Over time, the monastery endured Tatar and Ottoman raids, periods of abandonment, and material plundering. One early restorer before Hrizea Vornicul was maica Anghilina, a noblewoman turned nun, who partially rebuilt the church after its devastation during the reign of Simion Movilă. This version of the church, however, was again left in ruins until Hrizea undertook a major reconstruction in the early 17th century.

Although no surviving inscriptions confirm the exact date of the original construction, the concordance between local oral history, early travel accounts, and architectural features strongly supports the theory that the Bălteni Skete was established in the late 14th century, as part of the broader wave of monastic expansion in medieval Wallachia.

=== Maica Anghilina's contributions ===
Before the more widely recognized reconstruction undertaken by Hrizea Vornicul in 1626, the church experienced a prior phase of restoration due to the efforts of maica Anghilina, a noblewoman turned nun from the influential family of Cojești. Her involvement with the site is considered one of piety and personal grief, potentially connected to tragic events such as the death of her husband or father during the local conflicts with Mircea the Shepherd in the mid-16th century.

The monastery had fallen into a state of ruin, likely abandoned or seized by neighboring boyars, and maica Anghilina took on the responsibility of restoring it. While she is occasionally named in tradition as the founder, historical scrutiny and architectural continuity suggest that she merely repaired the existing structure rather than building anew. Her motivations are believed to have been deeply emotional, tied to honoring her deceased family members believed to be buried on the grounds. Inheritance records further confirm her role. She received the Bălteni from her mother maica Cătălina, daughter of the earlier landowner Badea Vornicul. Maica Anghilina subsequently founded or at least revived monastic life at Bălteni.

However, the monastery she restored did not enjoy peace for long. During the troubled reign of Simion Movilă (1600–1602), the monastery was burned and sacked by Polish and Moldavian troops allied with the new voivode. This violent episode coincided with maica Anghilina's death and led to the dispersion of her estate among her children, Barcă Postelnicul and Badea din Cojești.

=== Reconstruction ===
The most significant phase in the history of the church came in 1626, when the ruined monastic site was fully rebuilt by the powerful Wallachian boyar Hrizea Vornicul. A high-ranking official and politically ambitious figure, Hrizea's reconstruction of the monastery is commemorated in a pisanie (inscription) still visible today above the church's entrance. The inscription reads:

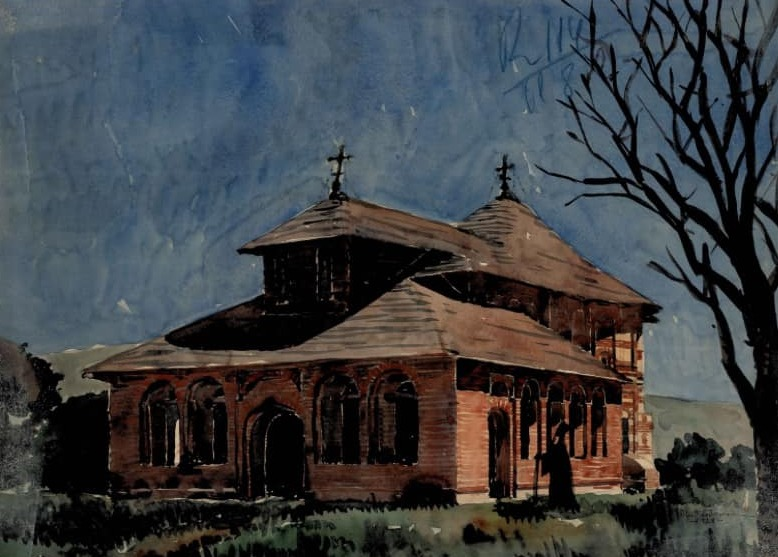
1928 painting of the Bălteni Church by Ilie Teodorescu

"This holy and divine church of the great Saint Nicholas the Bishop, I built from the ground up, me, the servant of Christ, Hrizea, great vornic, of how much God gave to spend, and with the help of God, I raised this holy cross for the glory and praise of God, the glorified one, in the Trinity and in the name of the great Saint Nicholas, the miracle doer, and, it began in the days of the enlightened voivode Io Alexandru, son of Radu... 1626."

Hrizea's involvement was driven by both pious and political motivations. As Ion Popescu-Băjenaru observes, the early 17th century was a time when elite boyars sought to demonstrate their wealth and religious devotion through monastic patronage, often as a means to gain prestige or even the throne. Hrizea, who had extensive wealth and powerful connections, likely saw Bălteni not only as a spiritual endeavor but also as a symbol of his legitimacy and ambition. Moreover, the location, deep within Codrii Vlăsiei, near Snagov, offered strategic value. Like other fortified monasteries of the time, the restored skete may have served as a temporary refuge or stronghold, in addition to its religious function. Popescu-Băjenaru notes that "boyars used this kind of settlements as defensive fortresses" in times of conflict.

Hrizea's rebuilding retained the core Orthodox layout, with pronaos, naos, and altar, but also showed influences consistent with earlier structures from the 14th century, suggesting a desire to maintain a sense of historical continuity. The masonry work was entrusted to a master named Stoica, whose signature was discovered carved into one of the church's exterior walls.

Hrizea endowed the monastery with extensive lands, many of which were formerly held by his son-in-law, Dumitrașcu Clucerul, including estates at Bălteni and neighboring villages. These lands were formalized through legal transfers and acts of donation. Perhaps most notably, Hrizea subordinated the Bălteni Skete to the Radu Vodă Monastery in Bucharest, which in turn was dedicated to the Monastery of Iviron on Mount Athos. This act "spiritual subordination" reflected a common practice in 17th-century Wallachia to link local religious institutions with prestigious centers of Orthodoxy in the Byzantine world.

=== Decline and modern era ===
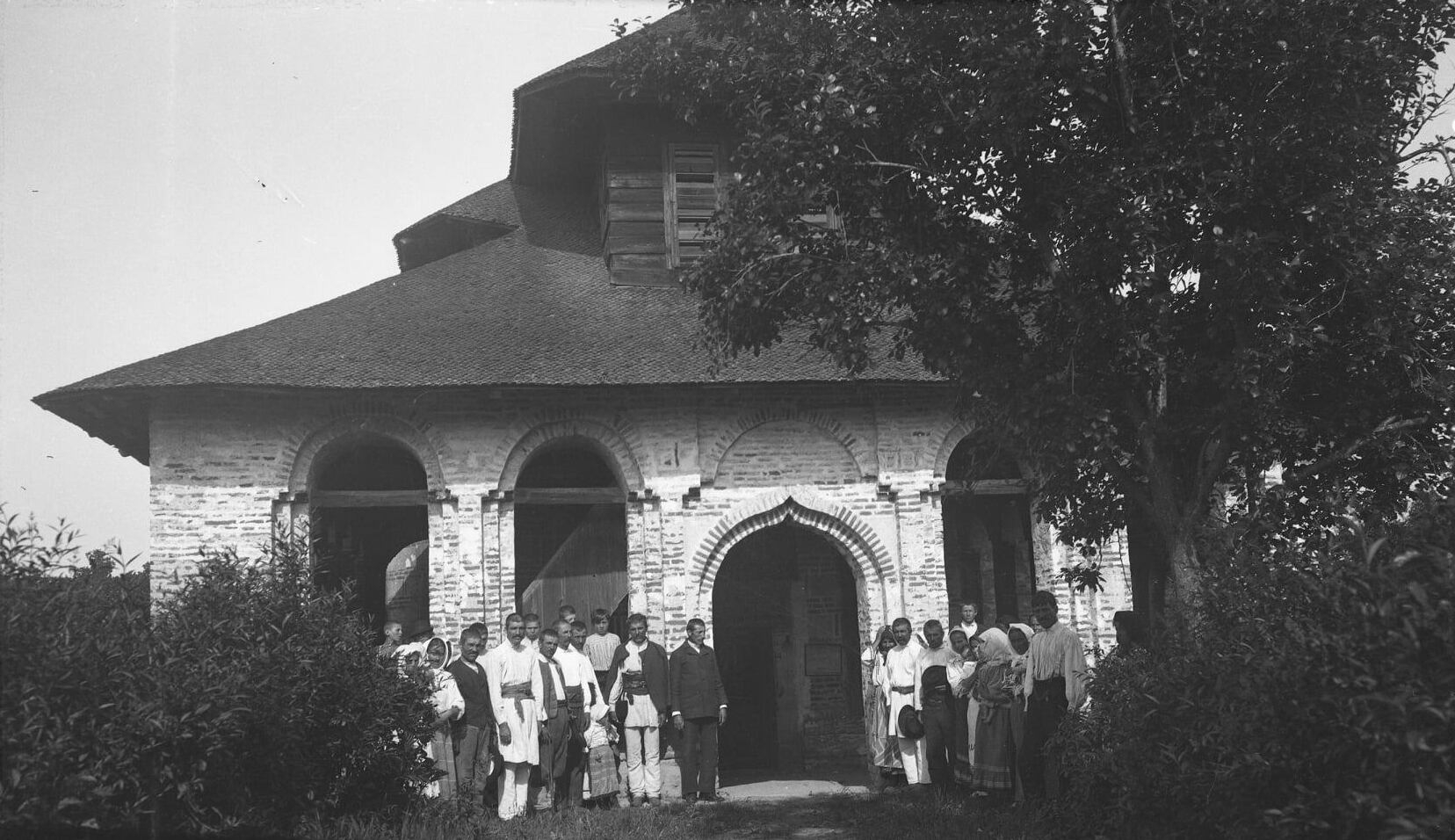
Villagers standing before the church in the early 19th century

Following the death of Hrizea Vornicul, the Bălteni Skete gradually declined over the next two centuries, as monastic life weakened and external support waned. By 1836, the church was repaired using funds contributed by the villagers, as evidenced by an inscription carved into a stone located in the church nave. During these repairs, a new iconostasis was donated by the faithful.

In 1851, the Radu Vodă Monastery, which had exercised spiritual jurisdiction over the Bălteni Skete since the time of Hrizea, carried out further structural work and converted the former monastic site into a parish church. Priests were sent from Radu Vodă on a rotational basis to serve the small local community. Four years later, in 1855, a noblewoman named Polcovniceasa Ștefana financed the re-paving of the church floor with bricks, further evidence of community-driven conservation during this era. That same year, the villagers appointed their first permanent parish priest, Father Dumitrache, followed shortly by Father Nicolae, who built a small residence near the church using bricks salvaged from the ruins of the original monastery buildings.

The most profound institutional shift occurred in 1864, with the implementation of Alexandru Ioan Cuza's secularization laws, which transferred all monastic estates to state ownership. Like many other Romanian monastic foundations, the Bălteni Skete lost its legal monastic status and was definitively classified as a parish church. Despite the secularization, minor repairs continued. In 1885, the Crown Domain Administration repaired the roof and replaced the deteriorating brick flooring with stone slabs. These were the first formal state interventions recorded after secularization.

In 1928, the Department of Architecture and Conservation at Ion Mincu University's archives created detailed architectural drawings of the church: eastern and western facades, floor plan, interior sections, and decorative details; by architects Petre H. Ionescu and Ilie Teodorescu. This effort is recorded in the Relevee archive documenting restoration priorities and providing an invaluable record of the church's structural condition at that time. Later 20th-century restorations included interior plastering in 1944 by the Ministry of the Navy, and further work by the Directorate of Historical Monuments between 1957 and 1976, which focused on roof stabilization and heritage preservation.

== Architecture ==
=== Layout ===
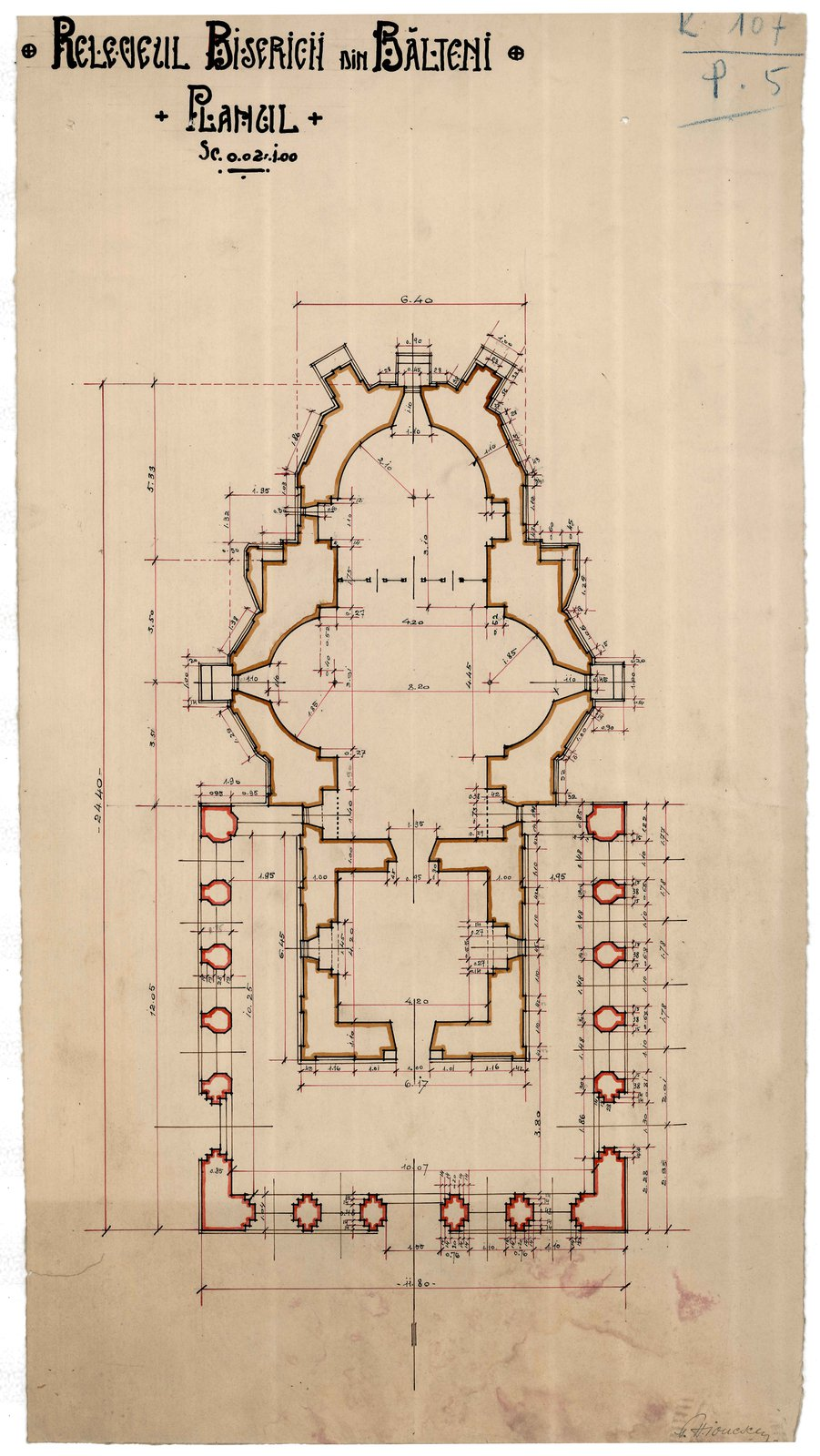
The church's 1928 floor plan

The church follows a trilobate floor plan, typical of Orthodox architecture, yet it stands out for its unique external porch and fortress-like appearance. It comprises three internal sections: the pronaos, the naos, and the altar, structurally divided by thick brick walls. A distinctive open portico wraps around the pronaos on three sides and is supported by brick arches and molded columns. The church’s exterior features massive buttresses, which enhance its fortress-like solidity and structural stability.

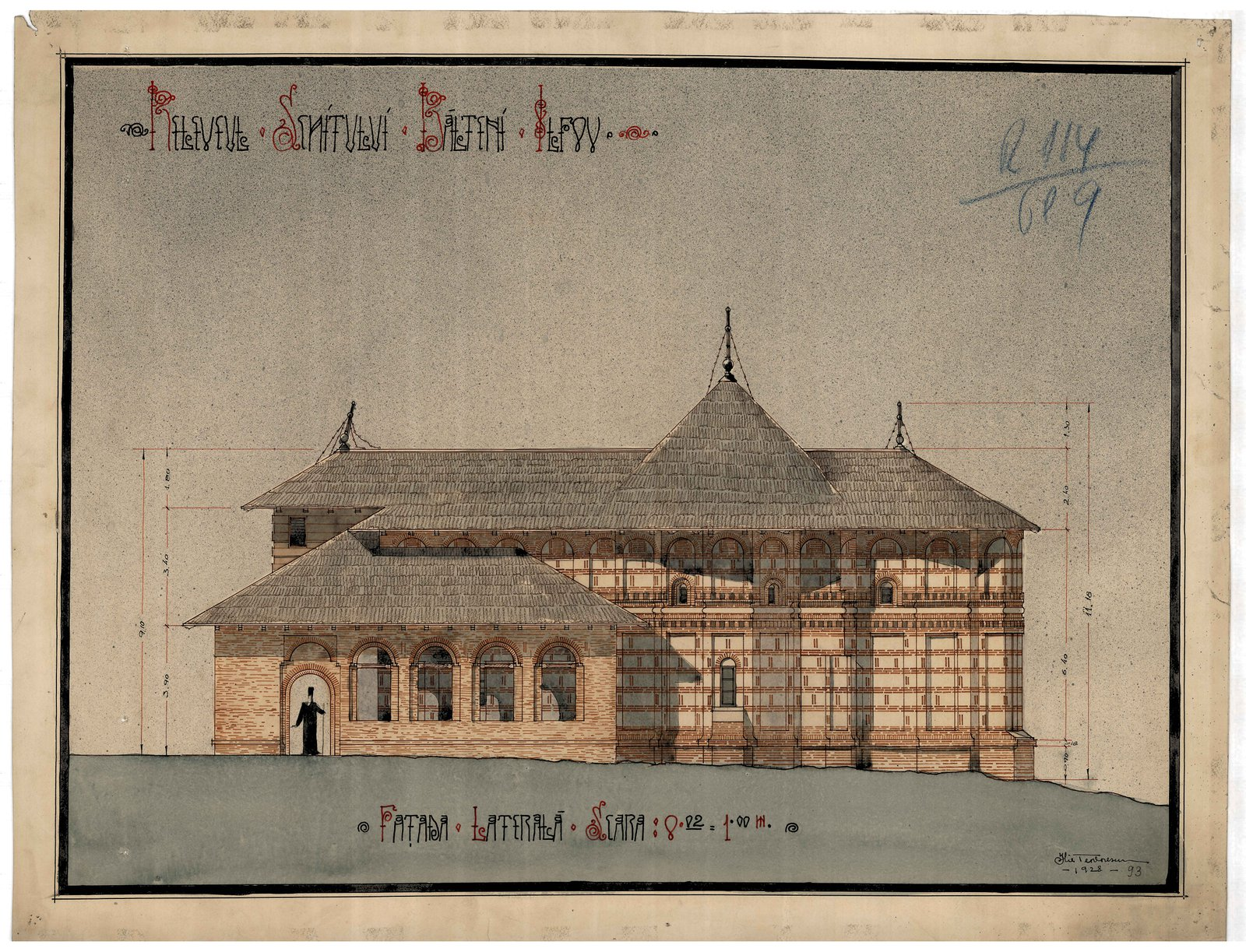
Side plan of the church in 1928

The naos is encased by a longitudinal semi-cylindrical vault interrupted only by a spherical dome resting on pendentives and arches and the entrance is marked by a stone-framed western doorway featuring a three-part lintel that includes the pisanie, reflecting the building’s historical inscription.

=== Iconography ===
Although the church is not extensively frescoed, it features a notable wooden iconostasis crafted and painted in the early 19th century. Built with oak beams, this icon screen enriches the church interior with traditional iconographic imagery. While most of the original monastery’s painted decoration did not survive, within the altar and naos, the presence of wear and selective iconographic fragments suggests there were once more vibrant mural paintings, now mostly lost to time.

No new iconographic works are attributed to the 20th century as the church’s art was already too deteriorated, and the focus shifted to structural rather than decorative restoration. Nevertheless, the remaining parish icons, particularly those depicting Saint Nicholas, continue to anchor the church’s spiritual life and link it to its dedication.

=== Materials and craftmanship ===
The church is constructed of solid burnt brick, with lime mortar. The base (soclu) is stone-lined, protecting the structure from capillary water damage, while the roof is clad in sheet metal (formerly shingle), protecting the barrel vault and dome.

The 1928 architectural survey led by Petre H. Ionescu and Ilie Teodorescu, preserved in the archives of Ion Mincu University of Architecture, includes full floor plans, façade elevations, and transverse sections. These archival drawings capture in great detail the church’s vertical proportions, decorative features, and spatial composition.
