= Periș =

- Commune
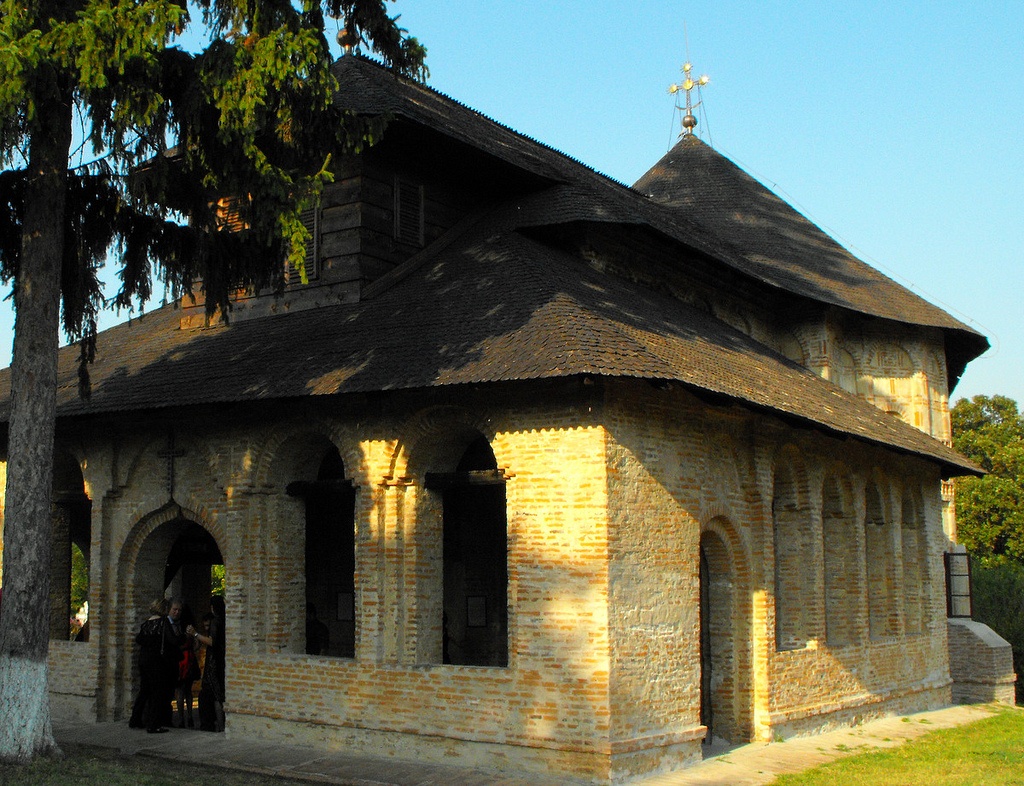
- St. Nicholas Church, Bălteni

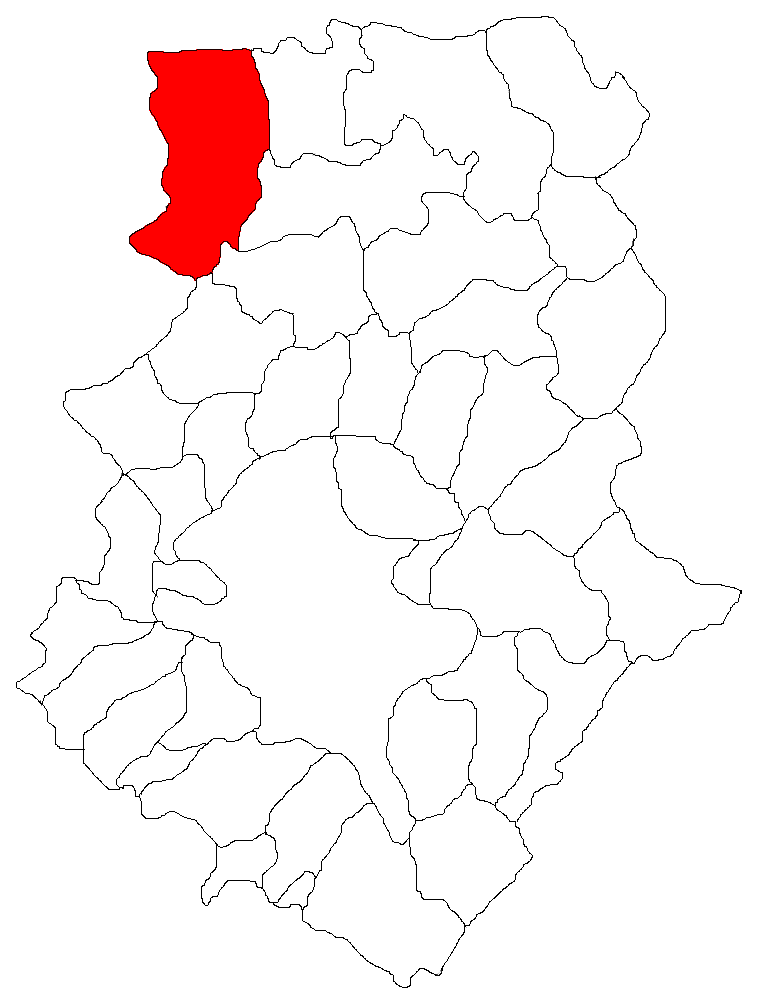
- Location in Ilfov County

- Location in Romania
- Coordinates: 44°41′N 26°1′E
- Country: Romania
- County: Ilfov

Government
  - Mayor (2024–2028): Cristian Gheorghe (PNL)
- Area: 77.97 km^{2} (30.10 sq mi)
- Highest elevation: 137 m (449 ft)
- Lowest elevation: 105 m (344 ft)
- Population (2021-12-01): 7,357
  - Density: 94.36/km^{2} (244.4/sq mi)
- Time zone: UTC+02:00 (EET)
  - Summer (DST): UTC+03:00 (EEST)
- Postal code: 077150
- Area code: +(40) 21
- Vehicle reg.: IF
- Website: www.peris.ro

Periș is a commune in the far northwestern corner of Ilfov County, Muntenia, Romania. The commune is composed of three villages: Bălteni, Buriaș, and Periș. It used to include Brătulești and Cocioc villages, until these were absorbed by other villages in the commune. In Romanian, its name means "a place where pear trees grow".

== Geography ==
Periș is situated on the border of the county with Dâmbovița and Prahova counties, 33.5 km (20.8 mi) north of the capital city, Bucharest. It lies on the right bank of the river Ialomița and on both sides of the river Vlăsia.

The surface area of the commune is 77.97 km^{2} (30.10 sq mi), and its altitude ranges from 105 to 137 m (344 to 449 ft) above sea level.

== Mayors ==
Name	Term	Political Party
Constantin Ioniță	1996–2000	Party of Social Democracy in Romania (PDSR)
Ion Florea	2000–2008	National Liberal Party (PNL) / Social Democratic Party (PSD)
Anghel Albu	2008–2023	National Liberal Party (PNL)
Zenobia Mureșan (acting)	2023–2024	National Liberal Party (PNL)
Cristian Gheorghe	2024–present	National Liberal Party (PNL)

== History ==
It was the site of the Battle of Periș, on August 24, 1546, where Mircea the Shepherd, Voivode of Wallachia, launched a surprise attack on the boyars opposing his rule and greatly decimated them.

Historical population
Year	Pop.	±% p.a.
2002	7,151	—
2011	7,557	+0.62%
2021	7,357	−0.27%
Source: Census data

== Natives ==
- Grigore Băjenaru (1907–1986), writer
- Dinu Cocea (1929–2013), actor, film director, and screenwriter
- George Dumitrescu (1901–1972), poet
- Eugen Nae (1974–), football player
