= Chivu =

Chivu is the name of:

- Chivu Stoica (1908–1975), Romanian Communist politician
- Cristian Chivu (born 1980), Romanian footballer
- Gheorghe Chivu (born 1947), Romanian linguist

== See also ==
- Stadionul Mircea Chivu, a multi-purpose stadium located in Reşiţa, Romania
