= Zidaru =

Zidaru, meaning "bricklayer", is a Romanian surname. Notable people with the surname include:

- Marian Zidaru (born 1956), Romanian painter and sculptor
- Octavian Zidaru (born 1953), Romanian fencer and coach
