= Battle of Periș =

1546 battle in Wallachia

Date	24 August 1546
Location	Periș, Wallachia
Result	Wallachian victory. Mircea the Shepherd keeps his throne.

Belligerents
Wallachia	Boyars

The Battle of Periș took place in Periș, Wallachia, on 24 August 1546, when some Wallachian boyars whom previously ran away to Hungary and Transylvania wanted to dethrone Mircea the Shepherd.

== Background ==
After Mircea the Shepherd became voievode of Wallachia, he commanded that many boyars be killed, among which: Coadă Vornicul, Radul Comisul, Dragul Stolnicul, Stroe Spătarul, și Vintilă Comisul. Before being killed, they were tortured to say where the money and jewelry were hidden to be taken to the treasury. After this event, many boyars took refuge in Hungary and Transylvania, from where they tried to bring down the voivode twice. The first try was at Periș and the second at Milostea.

== Battle ==
On 24 August 1546, the boyars' army was at Periș. Mircea the Shepherd's army attacked the boyars' army by surprise and then destroyed it.
