= Dimitrescu =

Dimitrescu is a Romanian surname that may refer to:

- Constantin Dimitrescu (1847–1928), Romanian classical composer and music teacher
- Constantin Dimitrescu-Iași (1849–1923), philosopher and sociologist
- Ștefan Dimitrescu (1886–1933), Romanian painter and draftsman

Fictional characters

- Alcina Dimitrescu, a character in the video game Resident Evil Village

== See also ==
- Demetrescu
- Dumitrescu
