= Grădiștea, Ilfov =

Grădiștea
- Commune
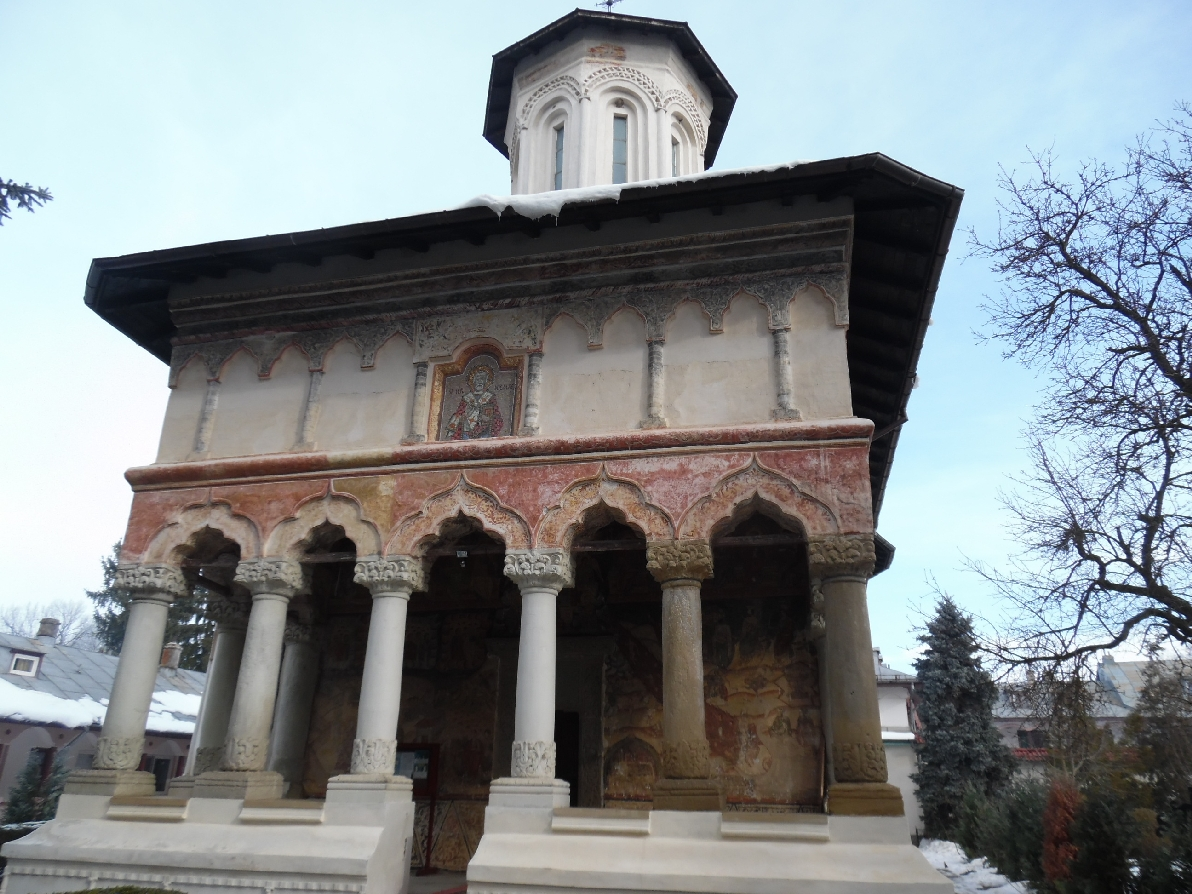
- Balamuci Monastery in Sitaru

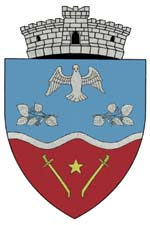
- Coat of arms

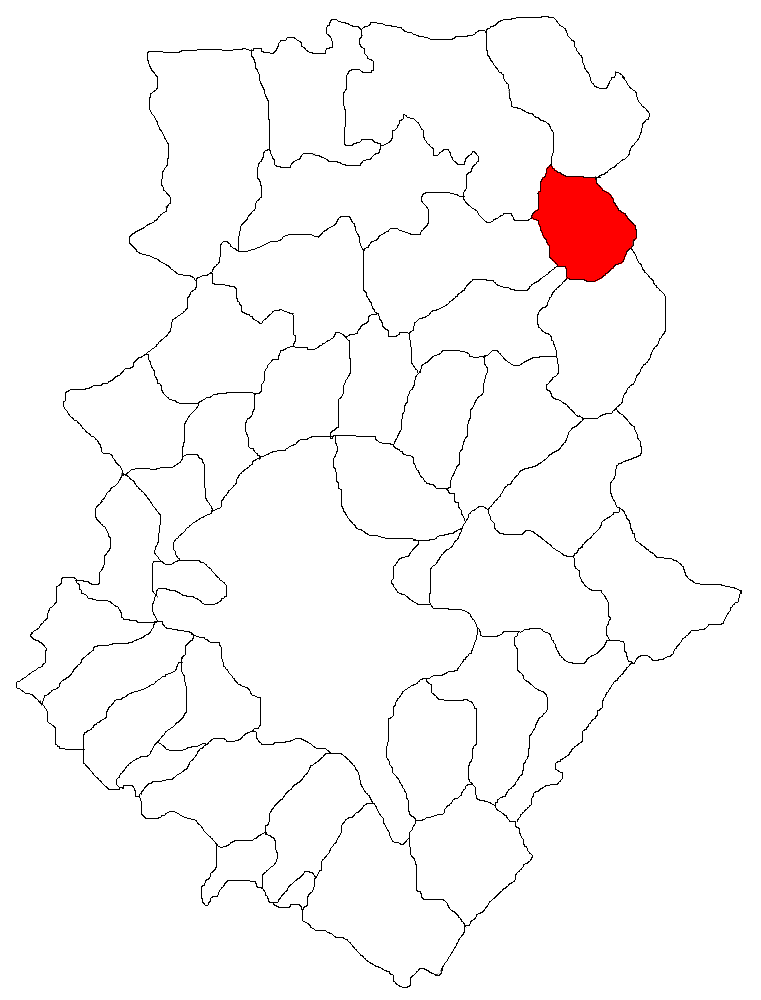
- Location in Ilfov County

- Location in Romania
- Coordinates: 44.662°N 26.301°E
- Country: Romania
- County: Ilfov

Government
  - Mayor (2020–2024): Mihail Toma (PNL)
- Area: 33.12 km^{2} (12.79 sq mi)
- Elevation: 84 m (276 ft)
- Population (2021-12-01): 3,231
  - Density: 97.55/km^{2} (252.7/sq mi)
- Time zone: UTC+02:00 (EET)
  - Summer (DST): UTC+03:00 (EEST)
- Postal code: 77110
- Area code: +(40) 21
- Vehicle reg.: IF
- Website: comunagradisteaif.ro

Grădiștea is a commune in the northeastern part of Ilfov County, Muntenia, Romania. It is composed of two villages, Grădiștea and Sitaru.

Grădiștea was known as Greci until 1934, after its early inhabitants who sold Greek products. It is the site of Căldărușani Monastery.

The commune is situated in the Wallachian Plain, at an altitude of 84 m (276 ft), in what was once the old-growth forest known as Codrii Vlăsiei. It lies on the banks of the river Vlăsia, which discharges into the Cociovaliștea in Lake Căldărușani.

Grădiștea is located in the northeastern part of Ilfov County, 34 km (21 mi) from Bucharest, on the border with Ialomița County. It borders Nuci to the north, Moara Vlăsiei and Dascălu to the west, Petrăchioaia to the south, and the town of Fierbinți-Târg to the east. The commune is crossed by county roads DJ101 and DJ200. The Greci halt serves the CFR Main Line 700, which connects Bucharest to Urziceni and continues northeast towards the border with Moldova.

Historical population
Year	Pop.	±%
2002	2,930	—
2011	3,268	+11.5%
2021	3,231	−1.1%
Source: Census data

At the 2021 census, the commune had a population of 3,231; of those, 93.04% were Romanians and 1.8% Roma.
