= Saint Nicholas, Theodor and Stylianos Church =

Coordinates: 44°37′22″N 26°06′43″E

- Biserica Sf. Nicolae, Teodor şi Stelian (Romanian)
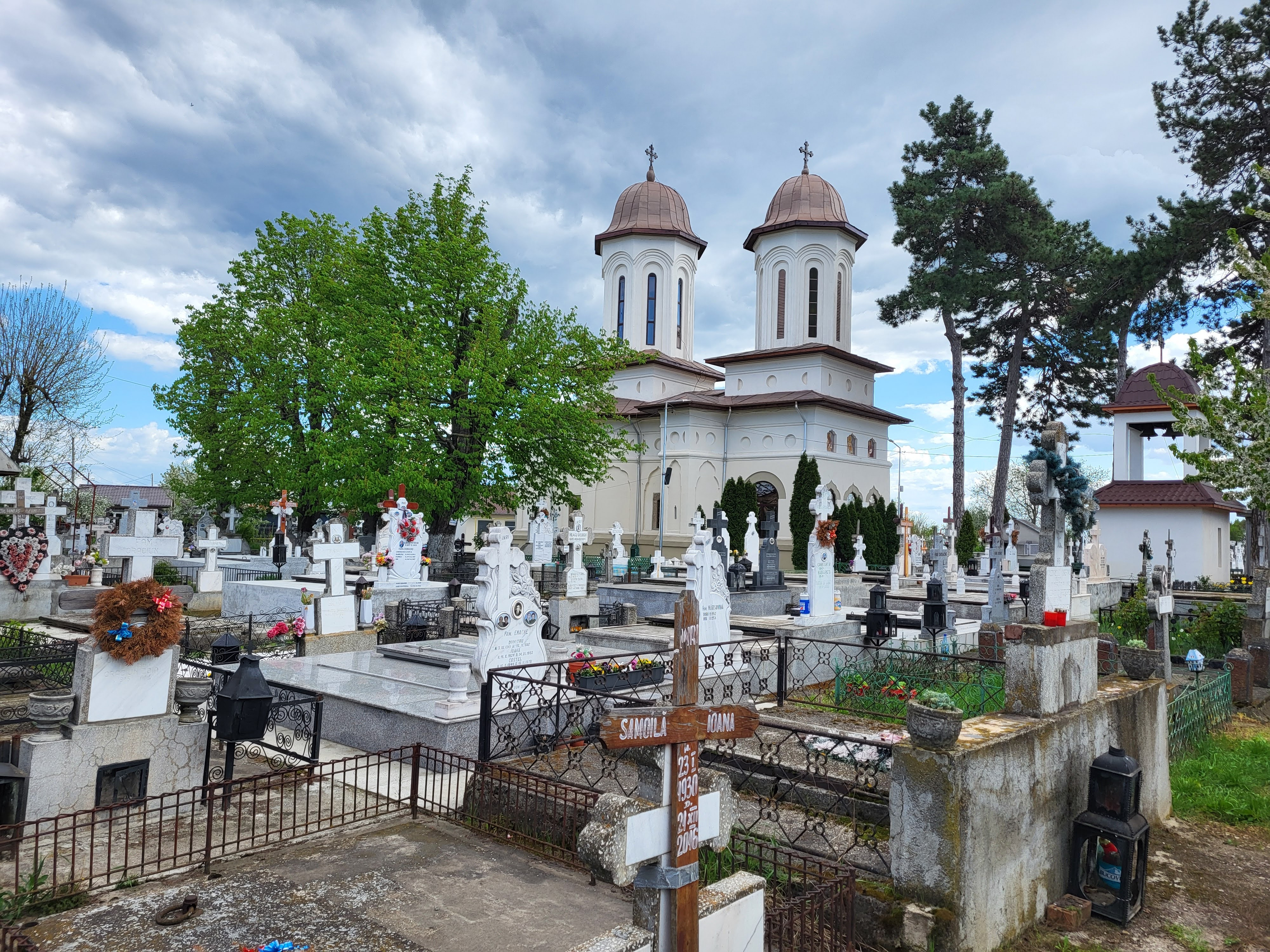
- Church in 2024
- Saint Nicholas, Theodor and Stylianos Church
- Location: Balotești, Ilfov County
- Address: Soseaua Unirii 221,
- Country: Romania
- Denomination: Romanian Orthodox Church
- Website: protoieriailfovnord.ro

History
- Status: Parish church
- Founded: 1763

Architecture
- Functional status: Active

Saint Nicholas, Theodor and Stylianos Church is one of the two Orthodox churches in Balotești, Ilfov County, Romania.

== History ==
The church was constructed in 1763 by the custodian of the princely mines, the Greek nobleman Zamfirache, and his wife Elena. The church is dedicated to Saints Nicholas, Theodore Tiron, and Stelian. Constructed in the shape of a cross, it features two domes on the roof, one serving as a bell tower until 1944 when the bell was hidden to prevent seizure by German forces. The church walls are a meter thick, and the interior is illuminated by five windows, each with a round vent covered by a filigree stone rosette for ventilation. Over time, renovations were made, including enclosing the church porch with doors and windows, and adding two smaller windows to the altar area.

The church bell, cast in 1906 with the assistance of Minister of Agriculture Ioan Lahovary, has since fallen into disrepair despite several attempts at welding. The church underwent various repairs over the years, including consolidations in 1822, 1868, 1965, and major renovations in 1982–1984.

Restoration works, including the painting, were carried out in 1992–1993, with support from local authorities, private firms, and the Romanian Orthodox Church. The names of parish priests since Stan are inscribed on the wall near the Prothesis.

The church's frescoes, last restored in 1993 by the painter Romeo Andronic, faithfully adhere to the original artwork. The iconostasis, made of stone, was also painted and restored in fresco.

Despite its historical significance, the church does not possess any national heritage objects.

There is a cemetery where Balotești citizens are buried.

== Gallery ==
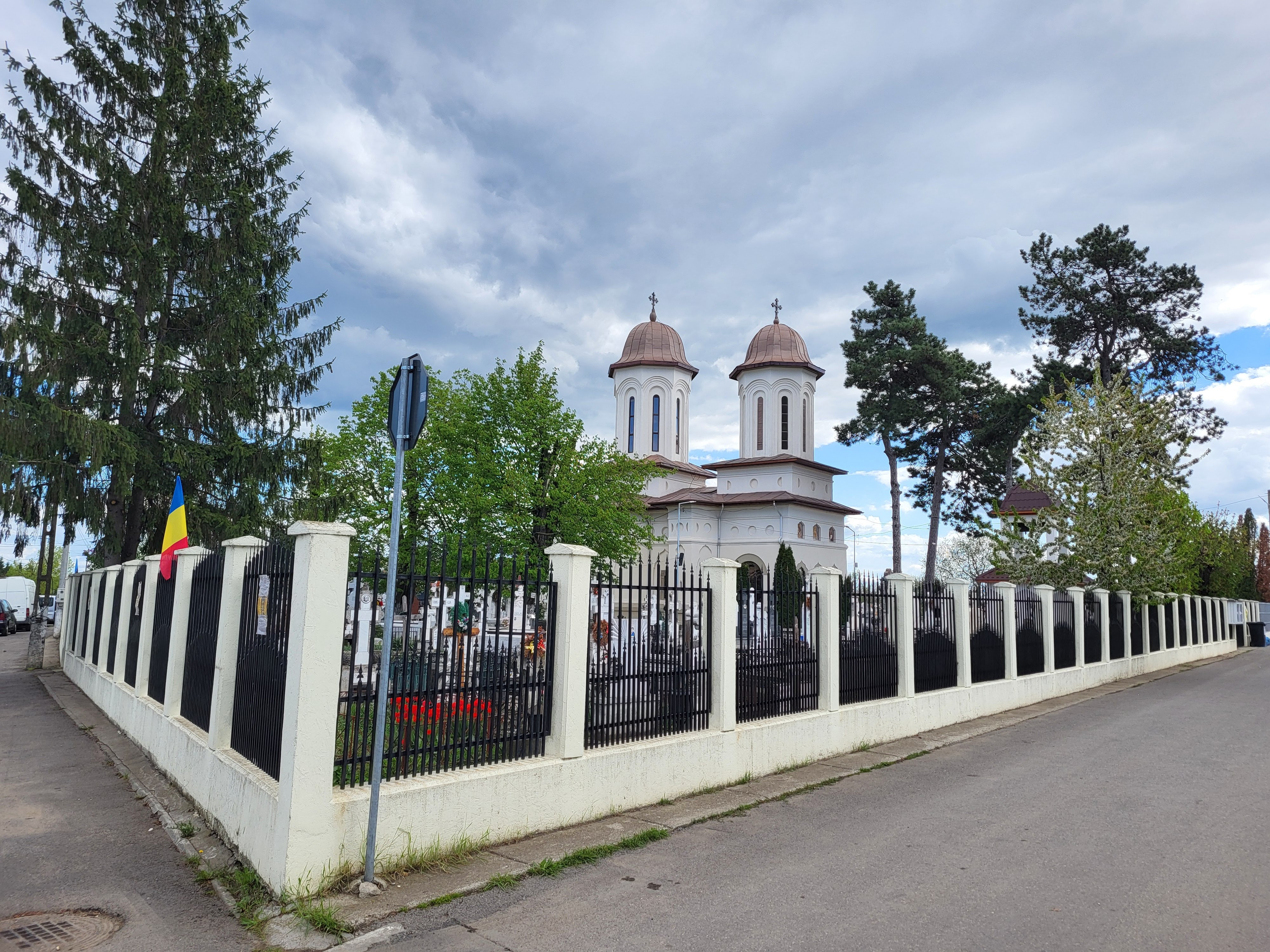
The Church from outside

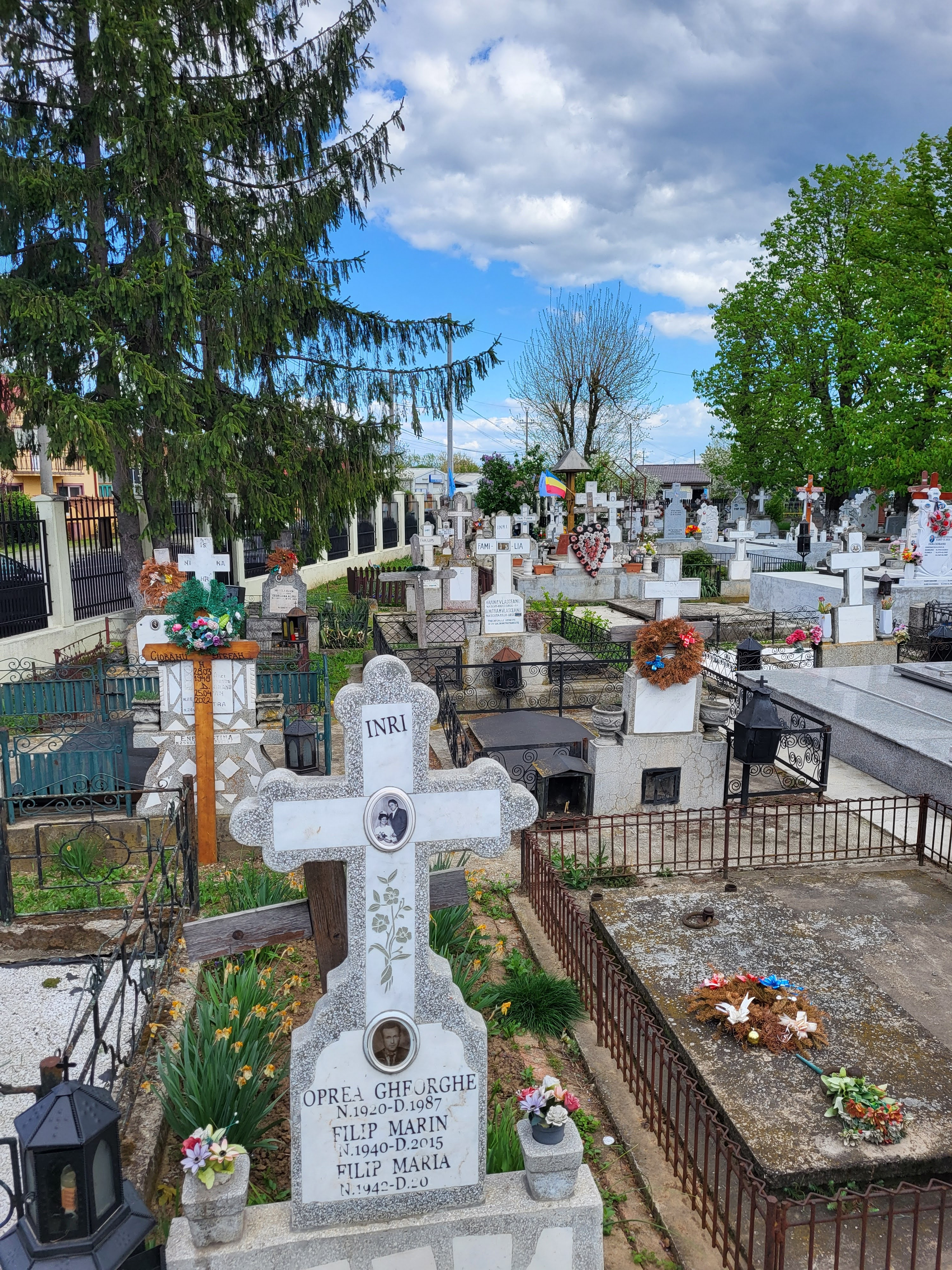
The cemetery
