= Dumitriu =

Dumitriu is a surname of Romanian and Montenegro origin. Notable people with the surname include:

- Anna Dumitriu (born 1969), British visual and performance artist
- Dumitru Dumitriu (born 1945), Romanian footballer and coach
- Ioana Dumitriu (born 1976), Romanian-American professor of mathematics
- Petru Dumitriu (1924–2002), Romanian novelist

== See also ==
- Dumitru
