= Cociovaliștea =

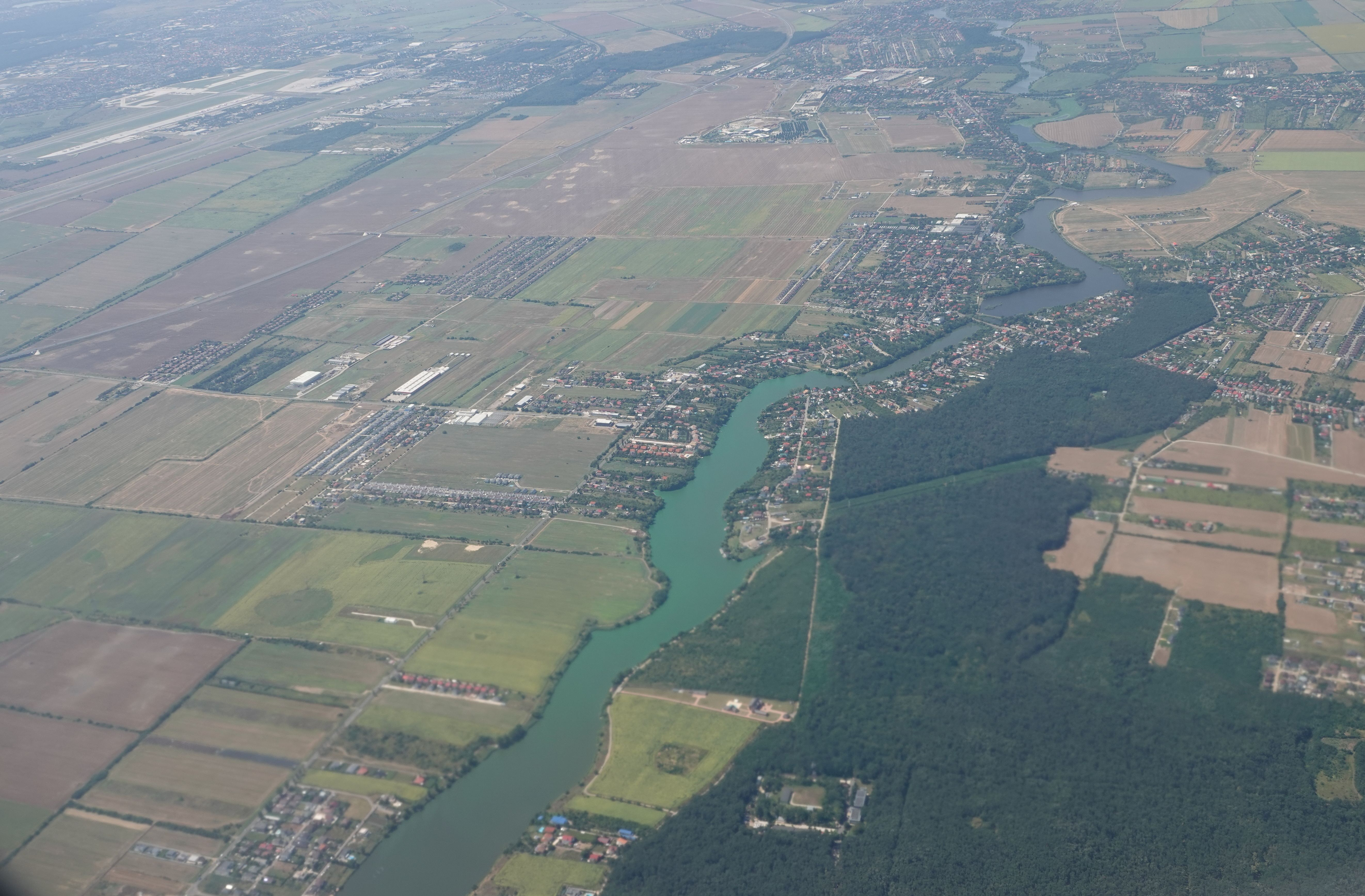

- Location within Romania

Location
- Country: Romania
- Counties: Dâmbovița, Ilfov, Ialomița

Physical characteristics
- Mouth: Ialomița
  - location: Fierbinți-Târg
  - coordinates: 44.6871°N 26.3798°E
- Length: 49 km (30 mi)
- Basin size: 192 km^{2} (74 sq mi)

Basin features
- Progression: Ialomița→ Danube→ Black Sea
- Tributaries
  - left: Vlăsia

The Cociovaliștea is a right tributary of the river Ialomița in Romania. It discharges into the Ialomița in Fierbinți-Târg. It flows through the villages Corbeanca, Săftica, Dumbrăveni, Balotești, Moara Vlăsiei, Grădiștea and Fierbinți-Târg. Its length is 49 km (30 mi) and its basin size is 192 km^{2} (74 sq mi).
