= Stadionul Central (Balotești) =

Multi-use stadium in Balotești, Romania

- Interactive map of Stadionul Central
- Address: Str. Stadionului
- Location: Balotești, Romania
- Coordinates: 44°37′2″N 26°5′57″E
- Owner: Commune of Baloteşti
- Operator: CS Balotești
- Capacity: 3,780 seated
- Surface: grass
- Field size: 102 x 62m

Construction
- Opened: 2010

Tenant
- CS Balotești (2010–present)

Stadionul Central is a multi-use stadium in Balotești, Romania. It is used mostly for football matches and is the home ground of CS Balotești. The stadium holds 3,780 people.
