= Dumitreni =

Dumitreni may refer to:

- Dumitreni, a village in Alexeevca Commune, Floreşti district, Moldova
- Dumitreni, a village in Bălăușeri Commune, Mureș County, Romania

== See also ==
- Dumitru (name)
- Dumitrescu (surname)
