= Demetrescu =

Demetrescu is a Romanian surname, derived from the root name Demetrius. Notable people with the surname include:

- George Demetrescu Mirea, Romanian portrait painter, muralist, and art teacher
- Traian Demetrescu, Romanian poet, novelist, and literary critic
- Demetru Dem. Demetrescu-Buzău, better known as Urmuz

== See also ==
- Dimitrescu
- Dumitrescu
