= Assumption of Our Lady Church, Balotești =

Coordinates: 44.618710°N 26.090241°E

Assumption of Our Lady Church
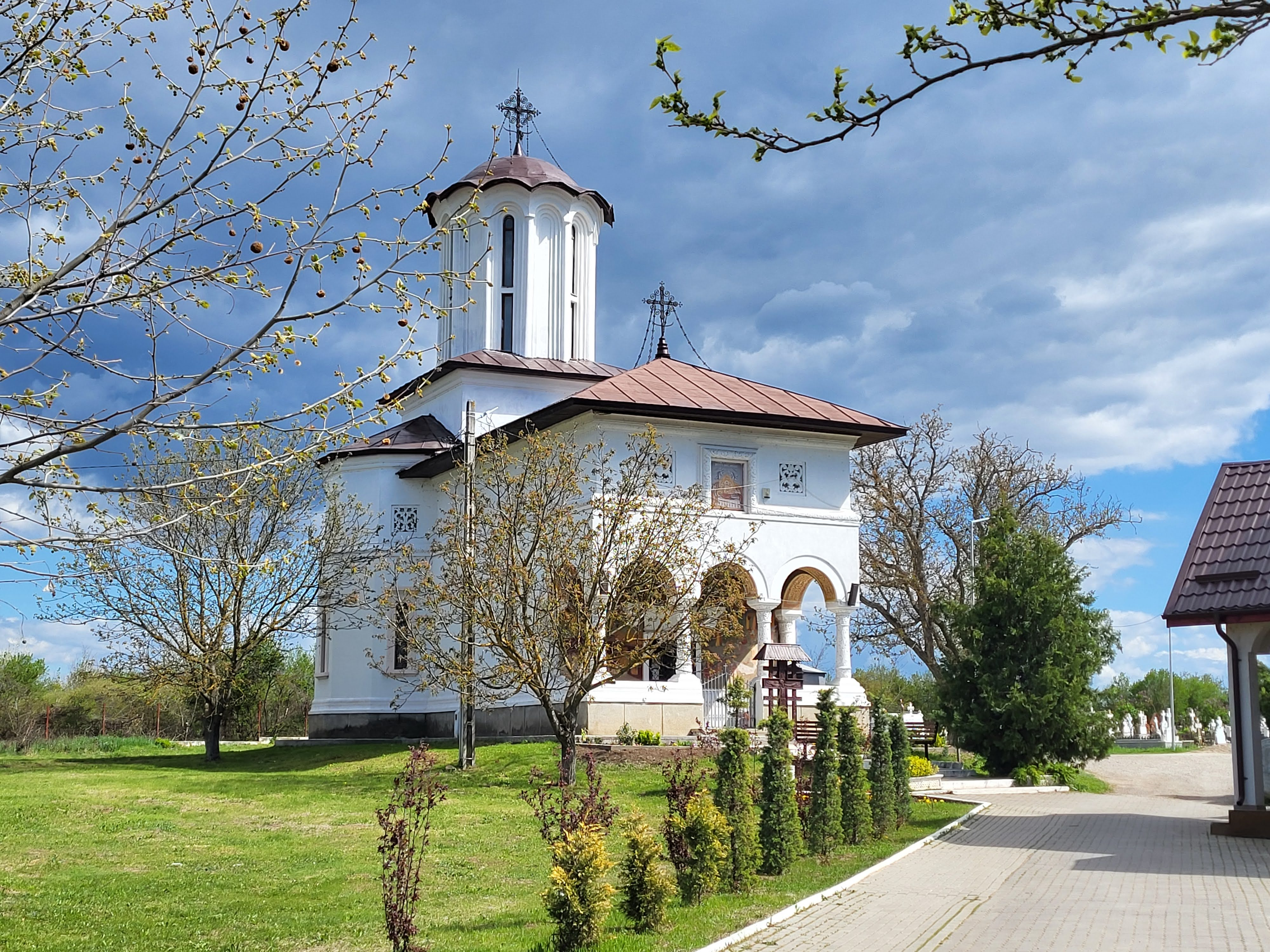
- The church in 2024
- Assumption of Our Lady Church
- Location: Balotești
- Country: Romania
- Denomination: Eastern Orthodoxy

History
- Status: Church
- Dedication: Mother of Christ

The Church of Assumption of Our Lady, Balotești (Romanian: Biserica "Adormirea Maicii Domnului" din Balotești) is one of the two Orthodox churches in Balotești, Ilfov County, Romania. It was founded in 1832.

There is a cemetery where Balotești citizens are buried.

== Gallery ==
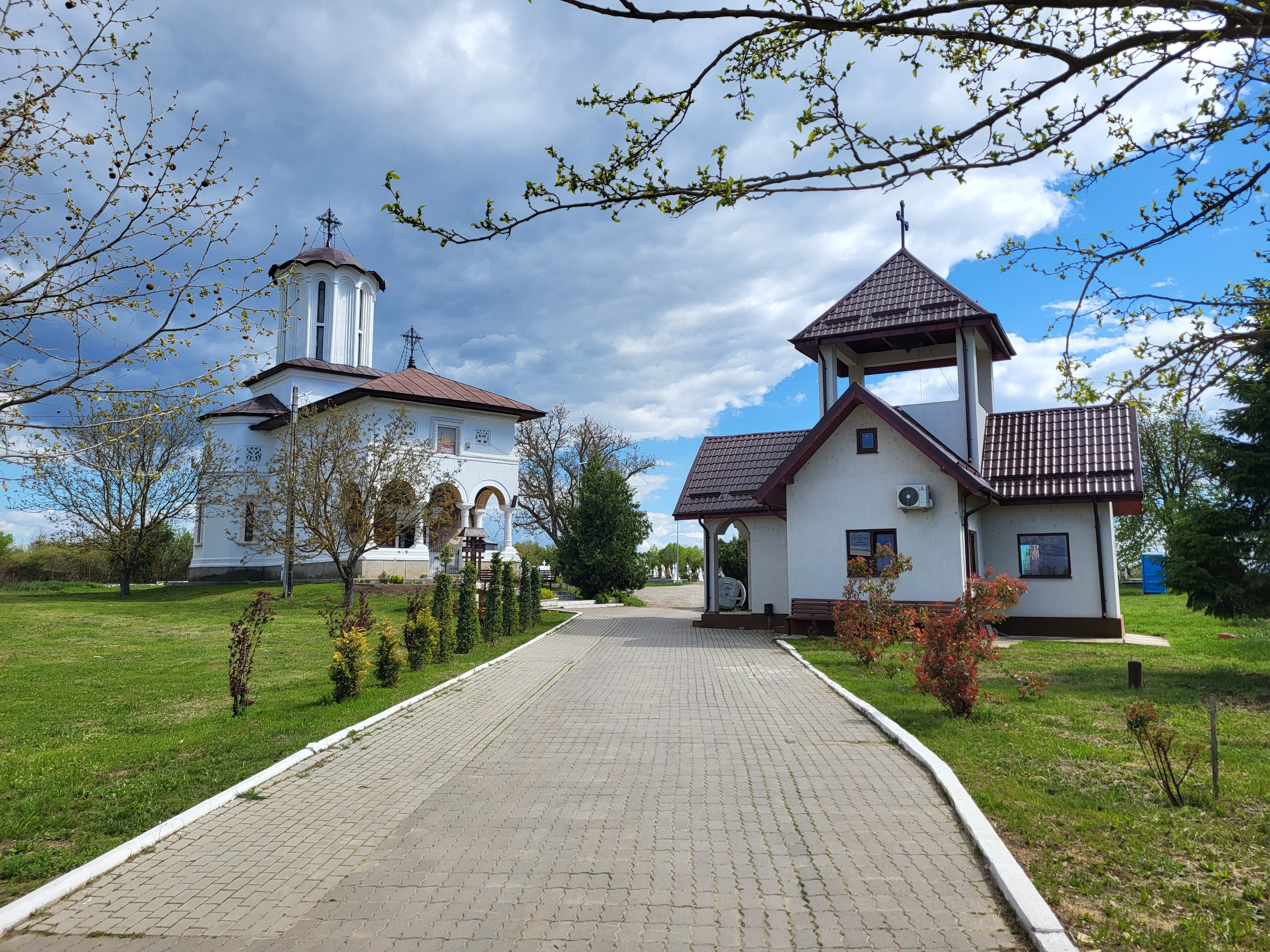
