= Marian Zidaru =

Romanian sculptor (born 1956)

- Born: 22 August 1956 (age 70); Balotești, Ilfov County, Romanian People's Republic
- Education: Bucharest National University of Arts
- Spouse: Victoria Zidaru
- Awards: Order of Cultural Merit, Knight rank
- Website: marianzidaru.ro

Marian Zidaru (born 22 August 1956) is a Romanian sculptor and painter.

== Biography ==
Born in Balotești, Ilfov County, he graduated in 1977 from the Fine Arts High School in Craiova. From 1977 to 1981, he attended the Nicolae Grigorescu Fine Arts Institute, where he had Vladimir Predescu and Marin Iliescu as teachers. From 1991 to 1995, he was an assistant in the Sculpture Department of the Bucharest National University of Arts.

In January 2020, he was awarded the Order of Cultural Merit, Knight rank, by President Klaus Iohannis.

== Bibliography ==
- Marian Zidaru "Desene 1984–2014", Editura Vellant, 2014, text by Erwin Kessler, Cristian Bădiliță, and Dan Popescu
- Monografia "Zidaru – dans werk von Marian & Victoria Zidaru", coordinators: Doina Talmann and Günter Strunck, Editura Klartext Verlang, Essen, Germania, 2011, text by Ruth Fabritius, Christoph Kiwelitz, Magda Cârneci, and Erwin Kessler.
- Catalogul Expoziției Zidaru – Îngeri, Tronuri, Voievozi, Centrul Cultural Palatele Brâncovenești Mogoșoaia, curator and text by Erwin Kessler
- Marian Zidaru, Catalogul expoziției "Rememorare” sau "Crăciun însângerat”, edited by Editura Uniunii Artiștilor din România, curator and text by Anca Vasiliu, Muzeul Satului și de Artă Populară al R.S.R. [Muzeul Național al Satului "Dimitrie Gusti", București], 1985 *Babeti, Coriolan -"Bisanzio dopo Bisanzio", Mostra D’arte Romena Contemporanea, Istituto Romeno di Cultura e Ricerca Umanistica, Palazzo Correr – Venezia, 1993
- La Biennnale Di Venezia. 46. Esposizione Internazionale d'Arte, English Edition Coll Cataloghi Marsilio Editori, 1995, Rumania – Comisar: Dan Haulica, Assistant Commissioner: Coriolan Babeti];
- Magda Cârneci, Le sculpteur: Marian Zidaru, Disciple de Brancusi ou artiste Prophete?, Ligeia, nr.57-58-59-60, ianuarie-iunie, Paris, 2005
- The Zidarus, Wards by Laura Yates, Randon Art Magazine, London, 2009
- Magda Cârneci, “Cazul Zidaru”, Revista 22, nr.47, 1998
- Theodor Redlow, "Aportes des temps derniers”, interview with Marian Zidaru, in Arta, nr. 4, București, 1992
- Călin Dan, Aspecte ale unei generații [Expoziția Tohatan-Stănescu-Zidaru], p. 30, Arta, nr. 11, 1986
- Erwin Kessler, X:20 – O radiografie a artei românești după 1989, Editura Vellant, 2013
- Adrian Buga, Albumul Colecția Regală de Artă Contemporană, Marian Zidaru present with "Valiza Regelui Mihai", Editura Unarte, București, 2011
- Adrian Guță, Generația 80 în artele vizuale, Editura Paralela 45, 2008
- Constantin Prut, Dicționarul de Artă Modernă și Contemporană, Editura Univers Enciclopedic, 2002
- Vlasiu, Ioana (coord.), Dicționarul sculptorilor din România. Secolele XIX-XX. vol. II, letters H-Z, Editura Academiei Române, București, 2011, p. 365
- Mariana Celac (Ed.) Bolt: Romanian Pavilion at the 11th International Architecture Exhibition, La Biennale di Venezia 2008: Out There. Architecture Beyond Building/ Catalogue edited by Mariana Celac; Texts by: Gabriela Adamesteanu, Paul Balaci, Geta Bratescu, Serban Cantacuzino, Ion Grigorescu, Ioana Iordache, Christian Mandeal, Marius Marcu-Lapadat, Solomon Marcus, Vintila Mihailescu, Cosmin Manolache, Serban Sturdza, Vlad Sturdza, Calin Torsan, Marian Zidaru, Editura Simetria, 2008
- Alexandra Titu (coordonator), Experiment în Artă Românească după 1960, Editat by the Soros Center for Contemporary Art, 1997; chief editor: Magda Carneci, editor: Irina Cios
- Constantin Prut, Marian Zidaru, Albumul, L'art Roumain, Répères Contemporains, p. 48, Editura U.A.P. din România, 1995
- Erwin Kessler, CeArta, Editura Nemira, 1997, București
