= George Dumitrescu =

Romanian poet (1901–1972)

George Dumitrescu (April 22, 1901 – October 22, 1972) was a Romanian poet.

== Biography ==
Born in Cocioc, Ilfov County, he attended high school in Ploiești, where one of his teachers was Ioan A. Bassarabescu. He then entered the University of Bucharest's literature and philosophy faculty, graduating in 1924 and earning a doctorate in 1938.

He was Mihail Dragomirescu's teaching assistant from 1925 to 1931, and also worked as a high school teacher.

Dumitrescu's published debut took place in 1920, with poems in Convorbiri Literare. His first book, the short volume Poezii, appeared the same year. He headed Ritmul vremii magazine from 1925 to 1929. His poetry books were Primăveri scuturate (1924), Cântece pentru madona mică (1926), Priveliști (1928), Elegii (1933) and Zăpezi și purpură (1936).

He also wrote collections of verses for children: Zvon și joacă de copii (1955), Ce mai faceți, florilor? (1957) and Glasuri limpezi (1961). The 1927 Opinii literare collected his criticism; Poezia lui Cerna (1939), in the same genre, was a monograph about the lyric poetry of Panait Cerna.

He won the Romanian Academy Prize in 1927 and the Romanian Writers' Society prize in 1934. He died in Bucharest.
