= Radu Vodă Monastery =

Romanian Orthodox monastery in Bucharest, Romania

Coordinates: 44°25′26.29″N 26°6′27.01″E

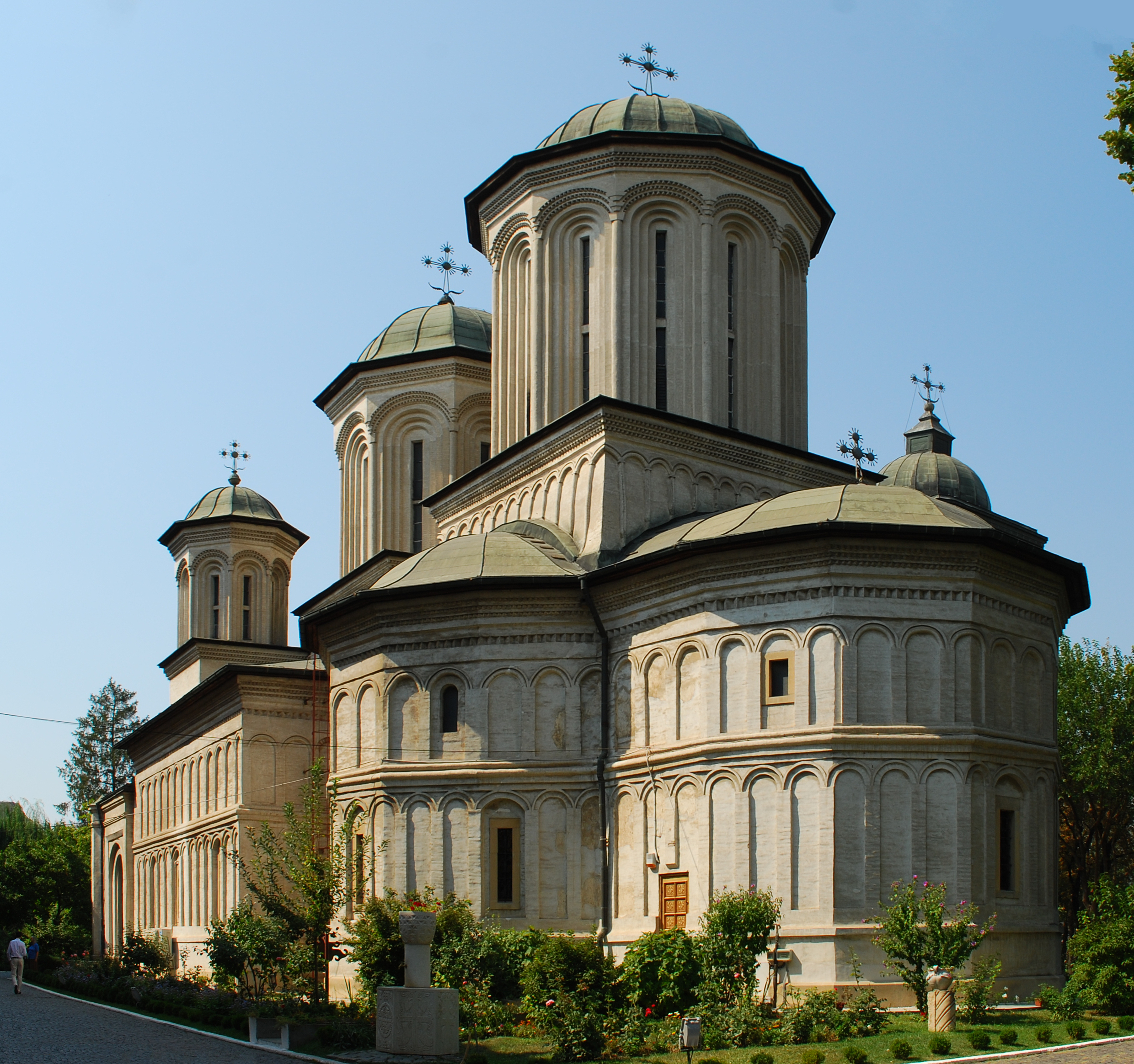
Church of the Radu Vodă Monastery

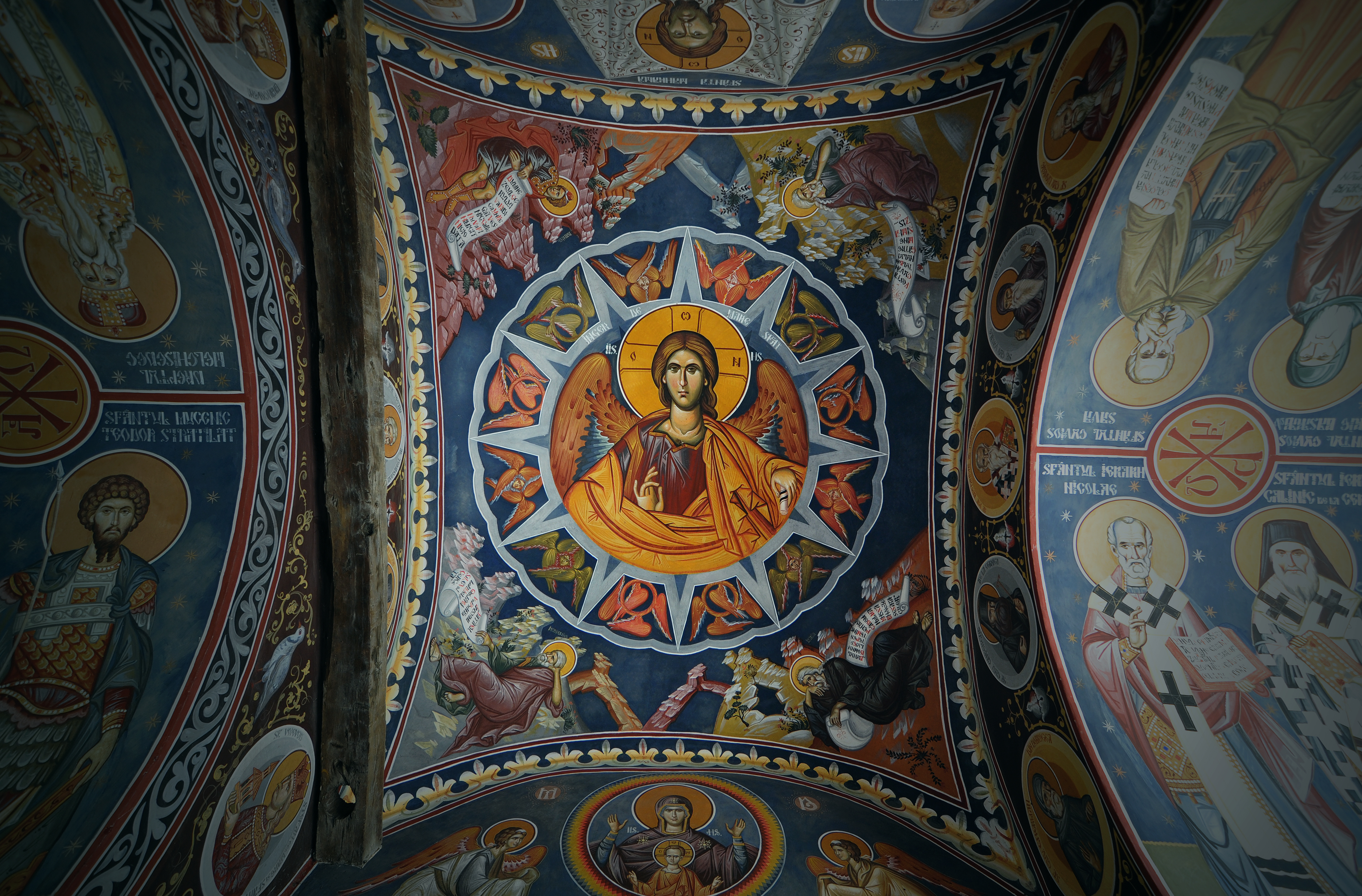
Belfry of Radu Vodă Monastery

Radu Vodă Monastery is a Romanian Orthodox monastery in Bucharest, Romania.

== History of the Place ==
=== Paleolithic ===
Because of its favorable environment and the elevated terrain close to a big river, the area of the monastery was inhabited starting from the Paleolithic (estimated somewhere between 1,000,000 and 10,000 BC). It is the site of the oldest known settlement on the territory of Romania. Following the Paleolithic settlement there was an uninterrupted settlement during the Neolithic with tools from the Neolithic, the Bronze Age (1,800–800 BC), and the Iron Age (800 BC – AD 300). It is a key Romanian site, founded in 1577, destroyed, and rebuilt over the centuries, with modern excavations often revealing deep cultural layers, including these earlier remains.

=== The Dacian Era ===
The monastery is also the site of the remains of a fortified settlement from the Dacian Era (100 BC – AD 100).

== History of the Monastery ==
The monastery was founded by Alexander II Mircea and his wife Catherine Salvaresso to give thanks for their victory in battle. It was intended to be the metropolitan church of the capital. It was later completed under the rule of Radu Mihnea, whose name it now carries. The monastery was completely renovated during 1969–1974, on the initiative of patriarch Justinian Marina. Upon his death in 1977, the patriarch was laid to rest in a grave in the interior wall of the monastery.

== Location ==
Located at Radu Vodă Street, no. 24A on the banks of Dâmbovița River and close to the Romanian Patriarchal Cathedral, the monastery is located right in the middle of Bucharest, the capital of Romania. It is a few hundred meters away from the exit of Piața Unirii metro station.

== Gallery ==
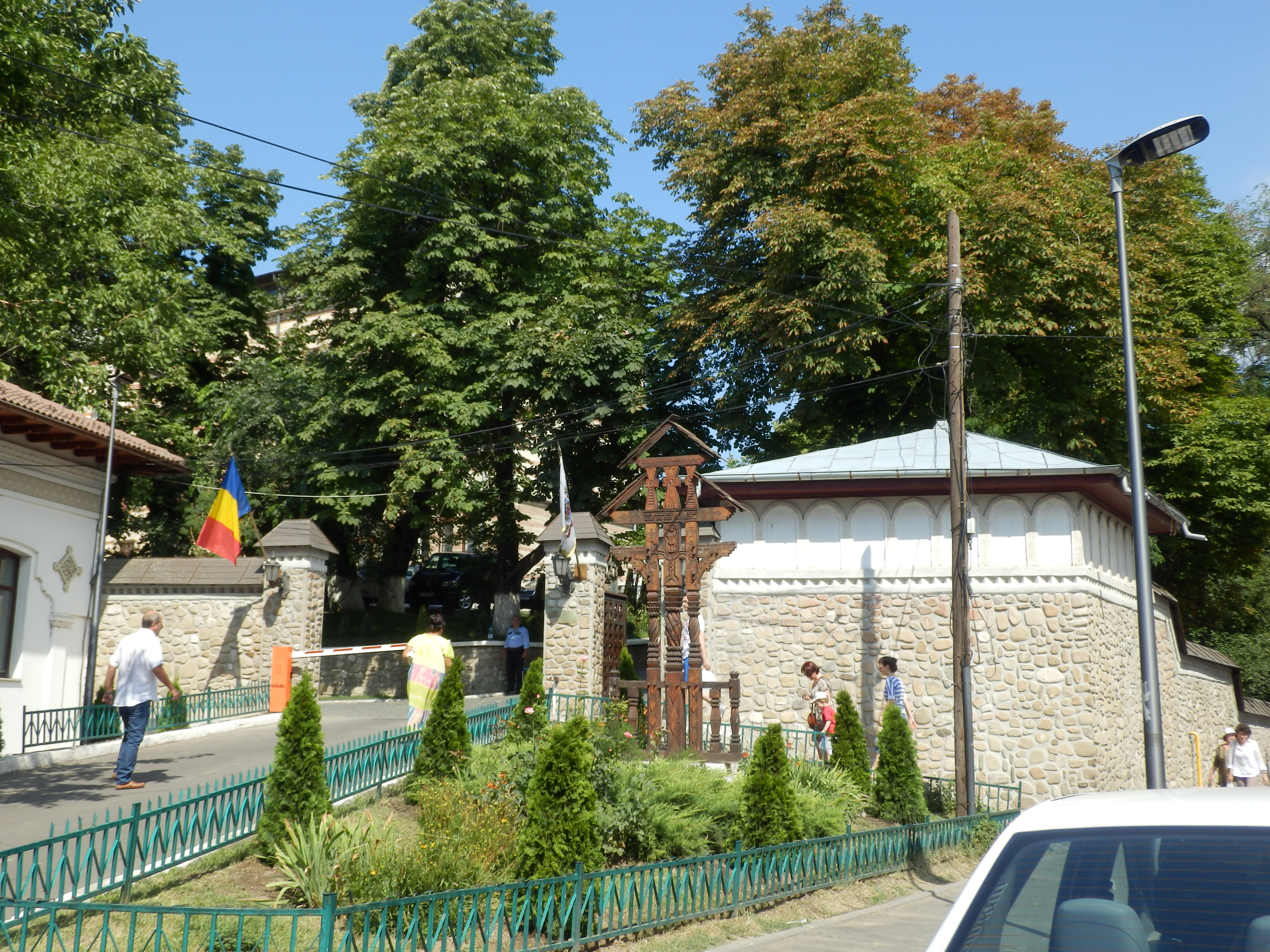
Gate

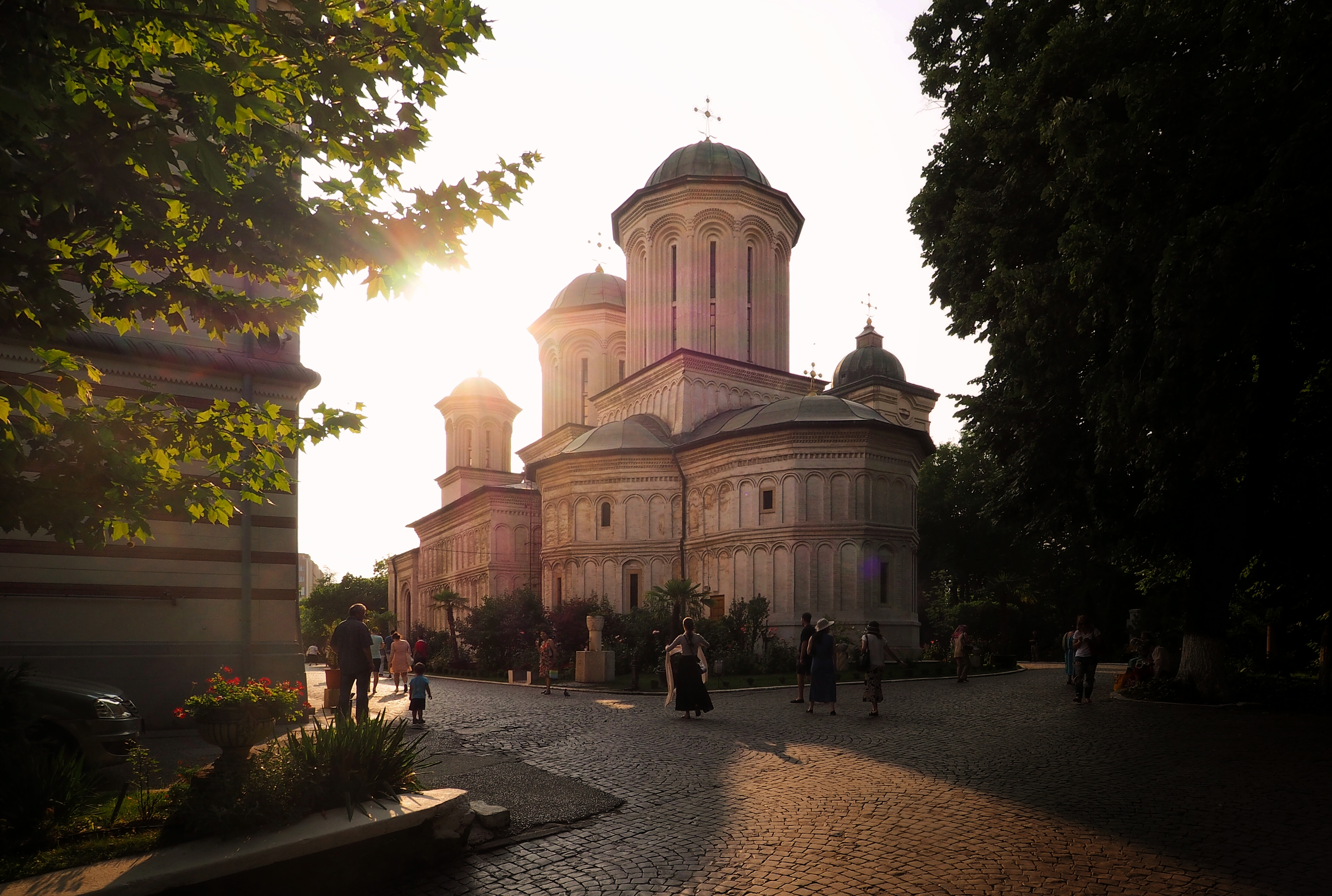

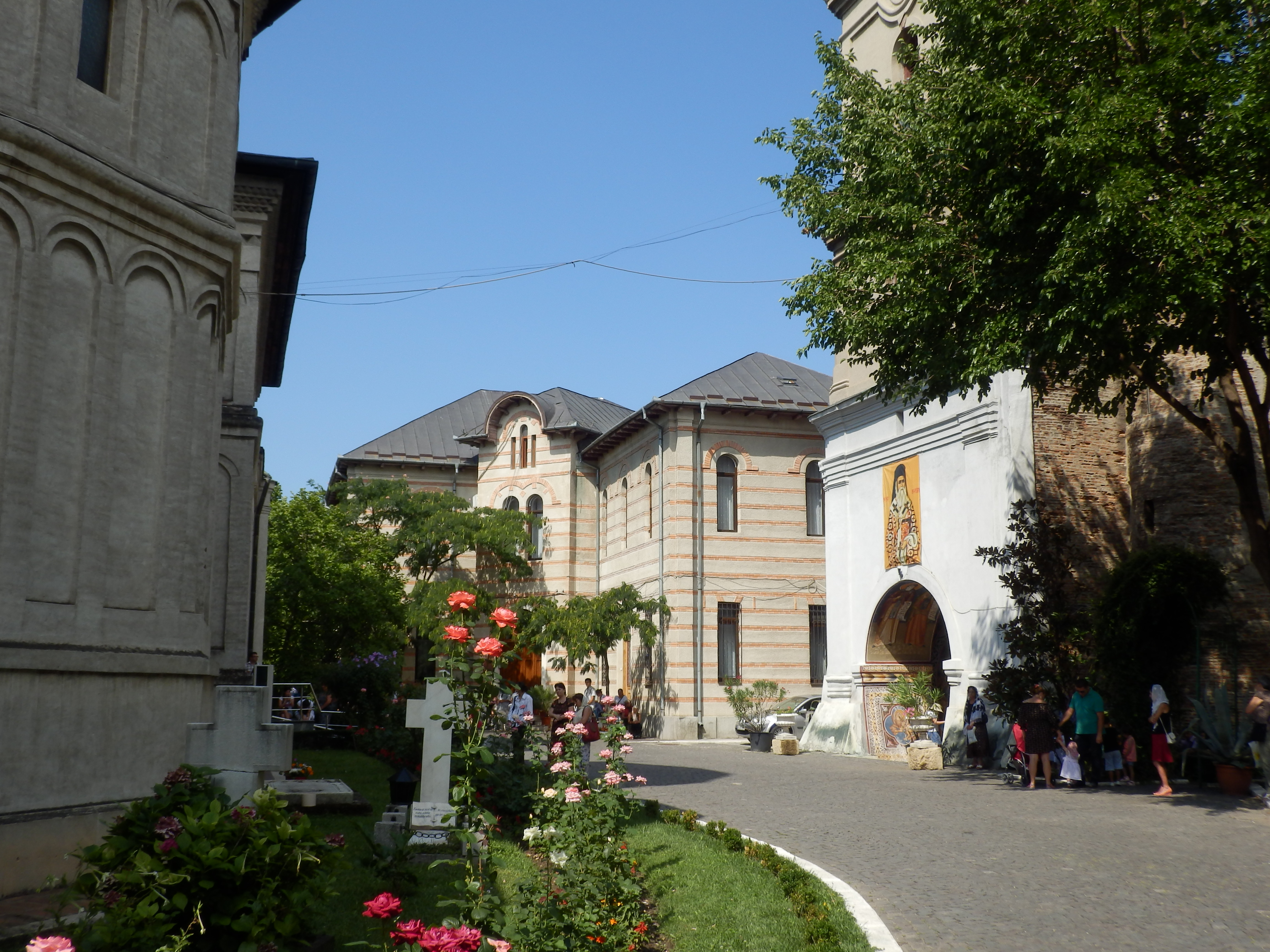
Courtyard

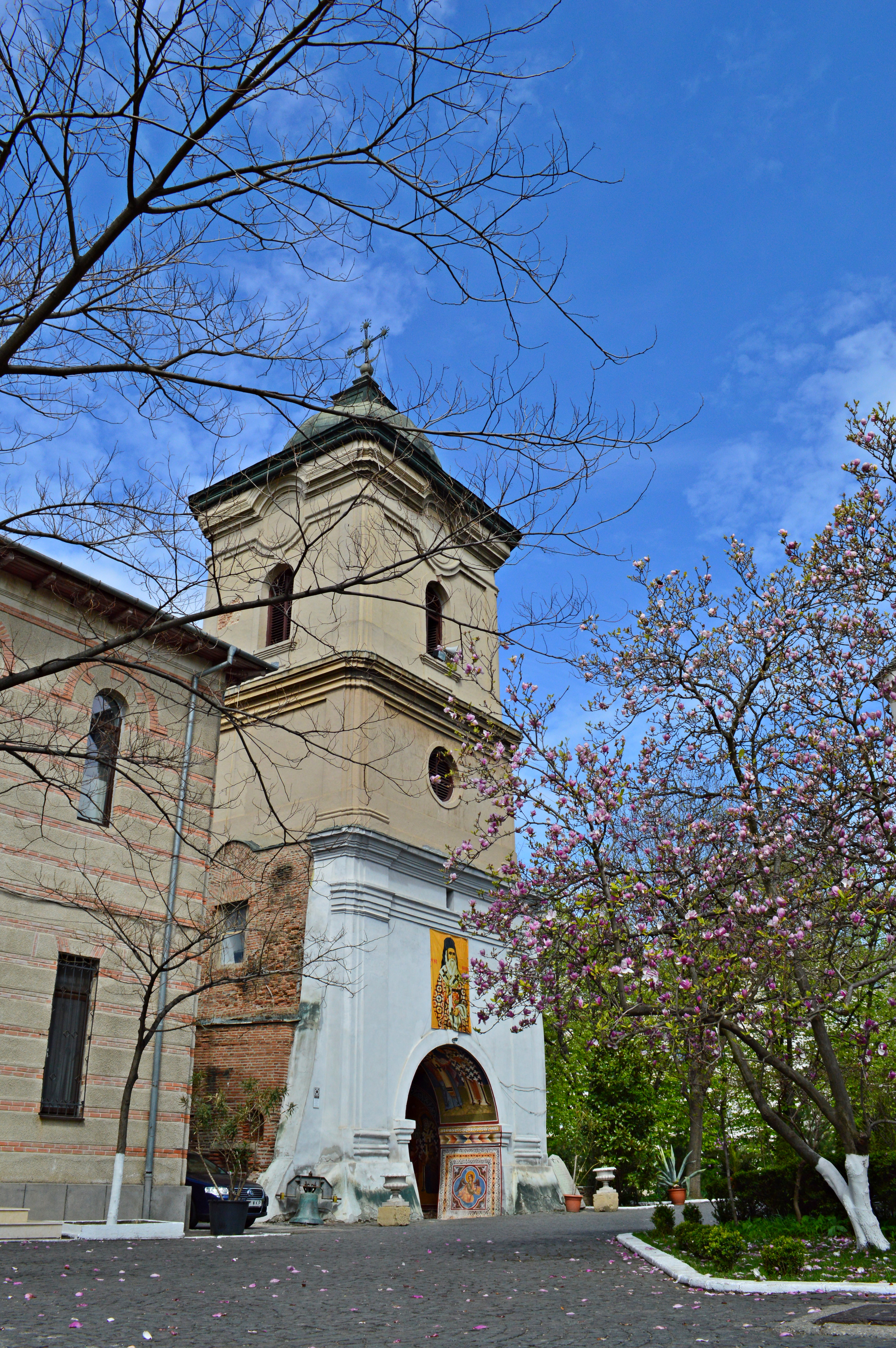
Tower bell

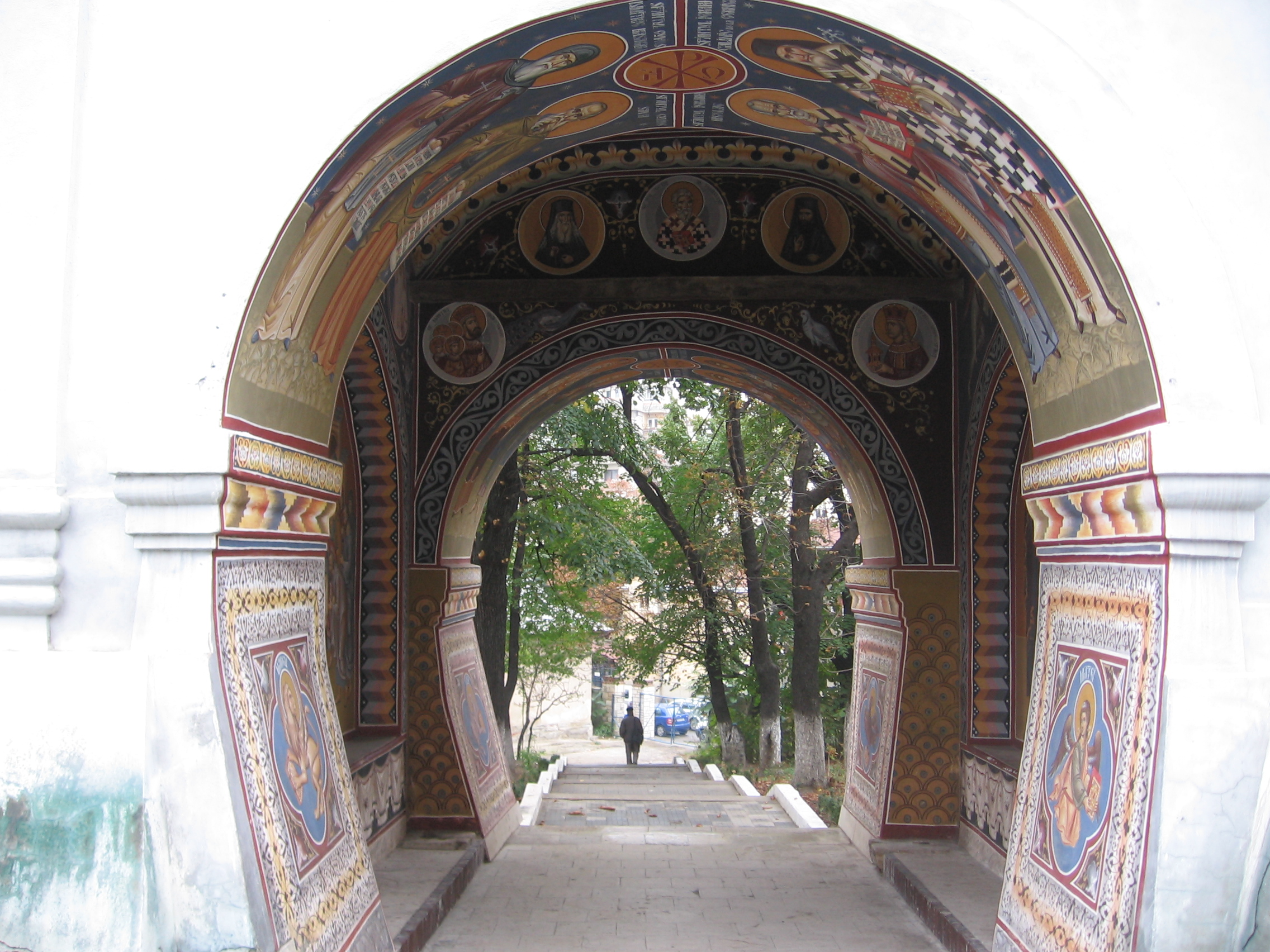

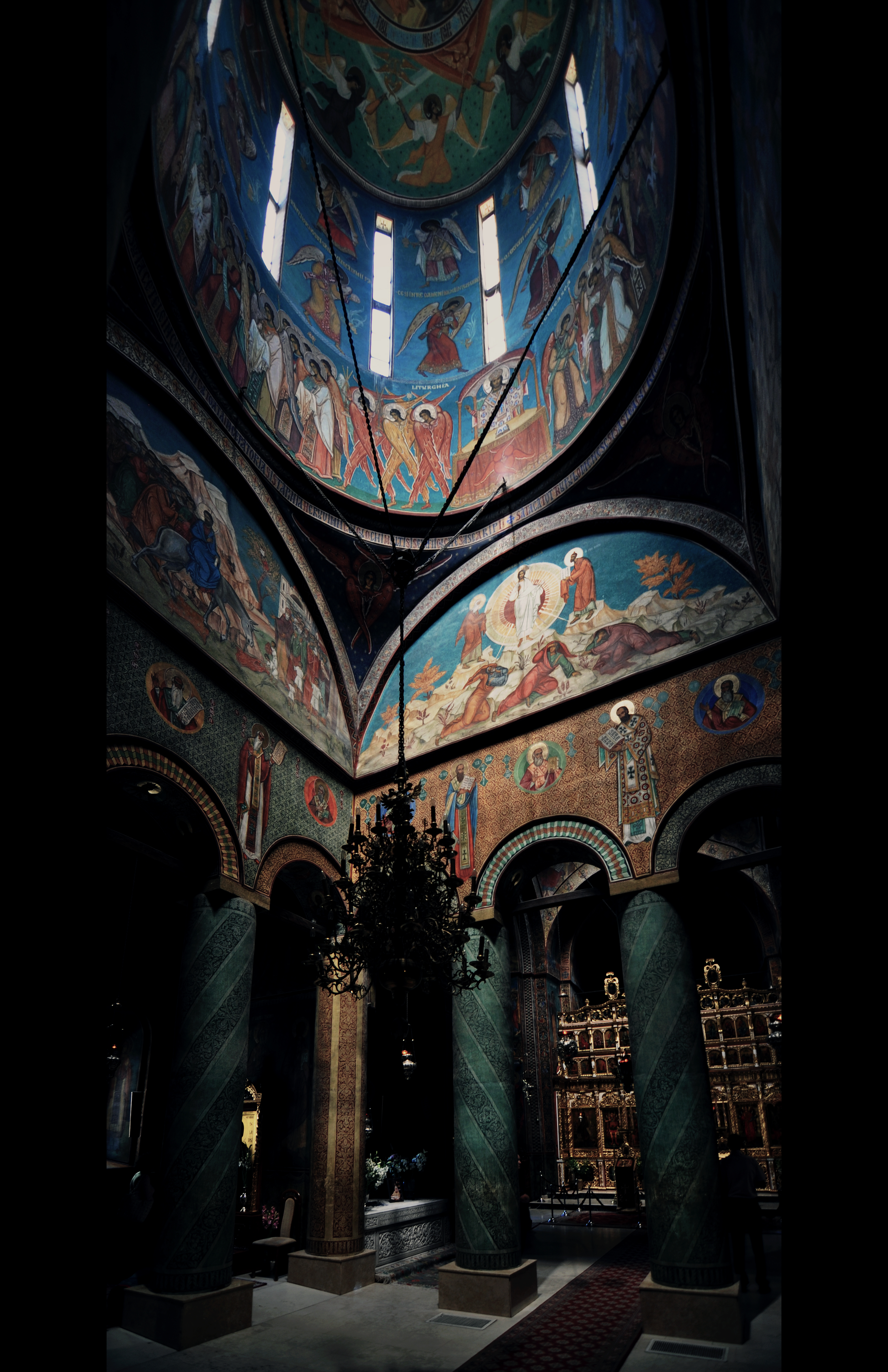

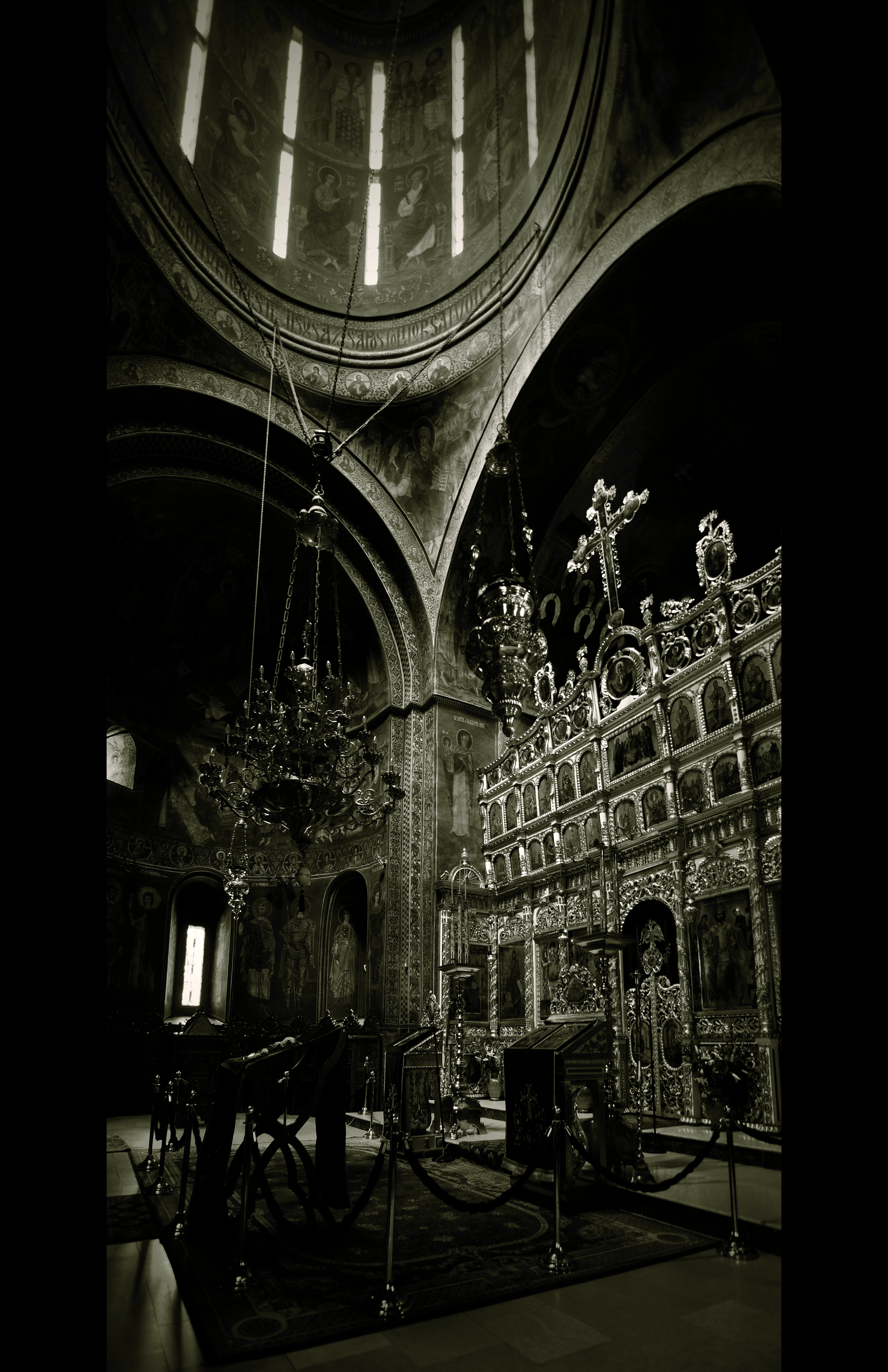
Altar

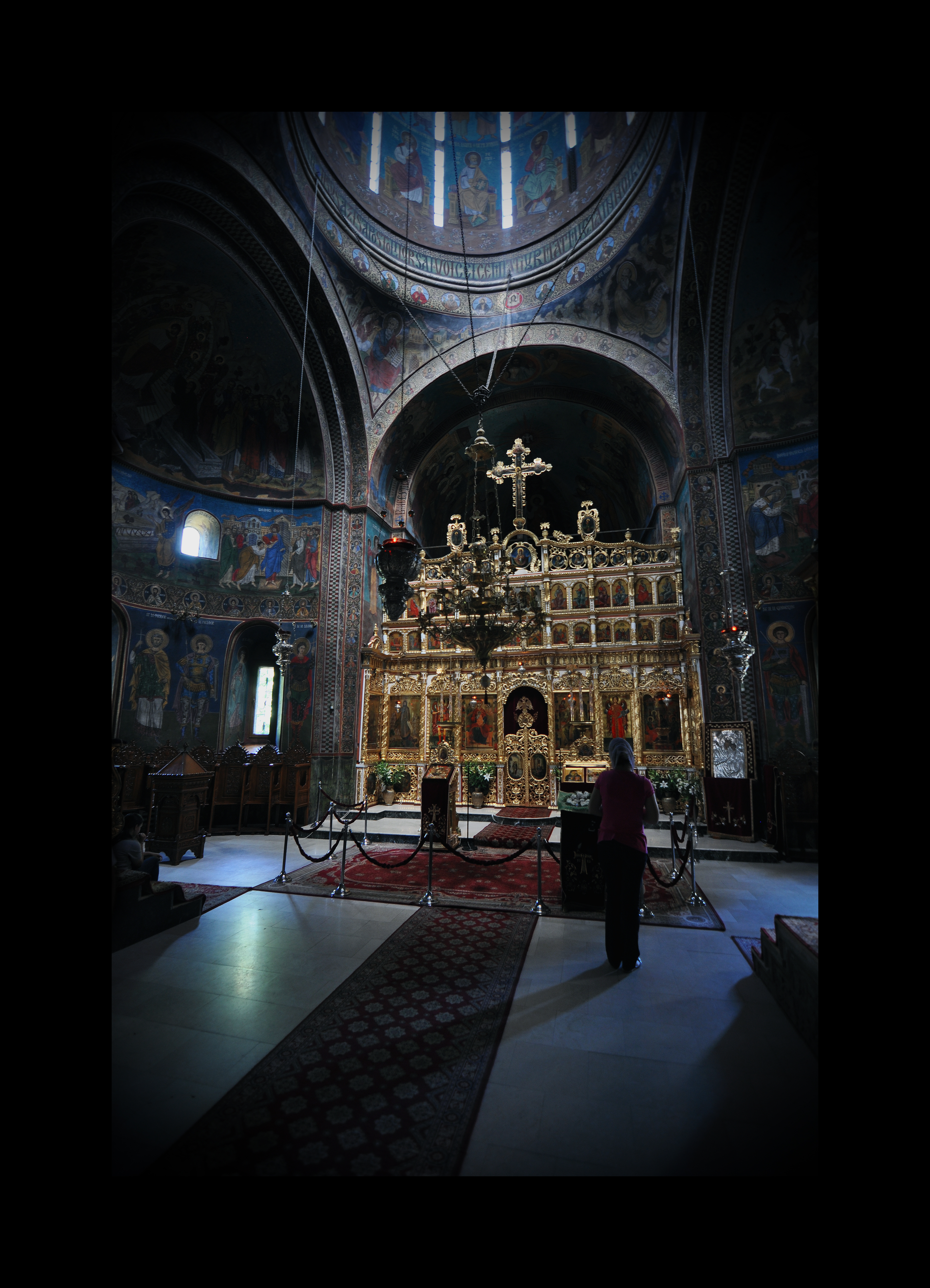

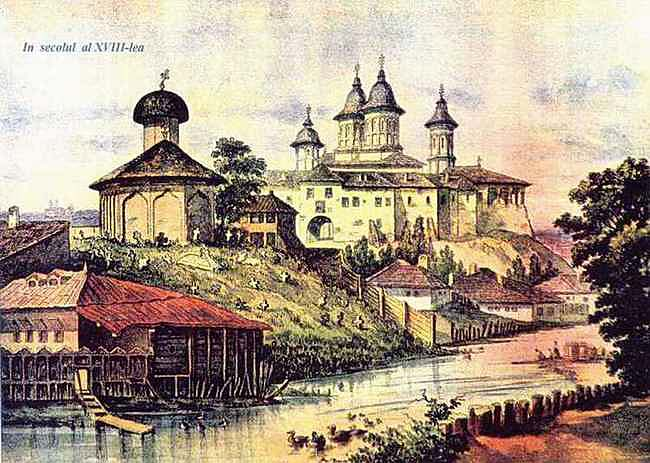
The 18th century
