= Nuci =

- Commune
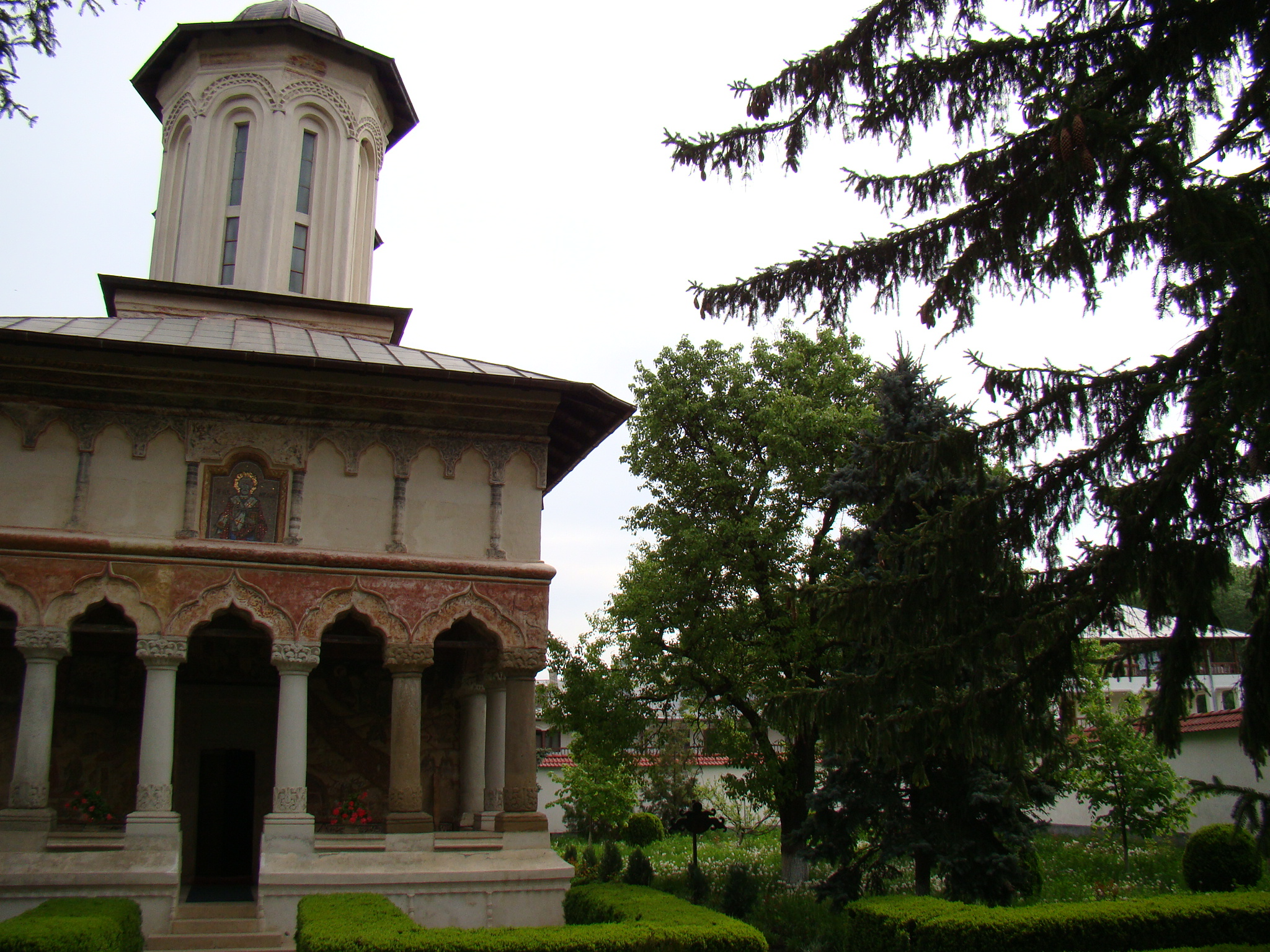
- Saint Nicholas Church at Balamuci Monastery in Balta Neagră

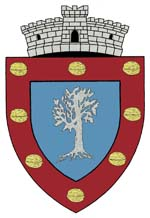
- Coat of arms

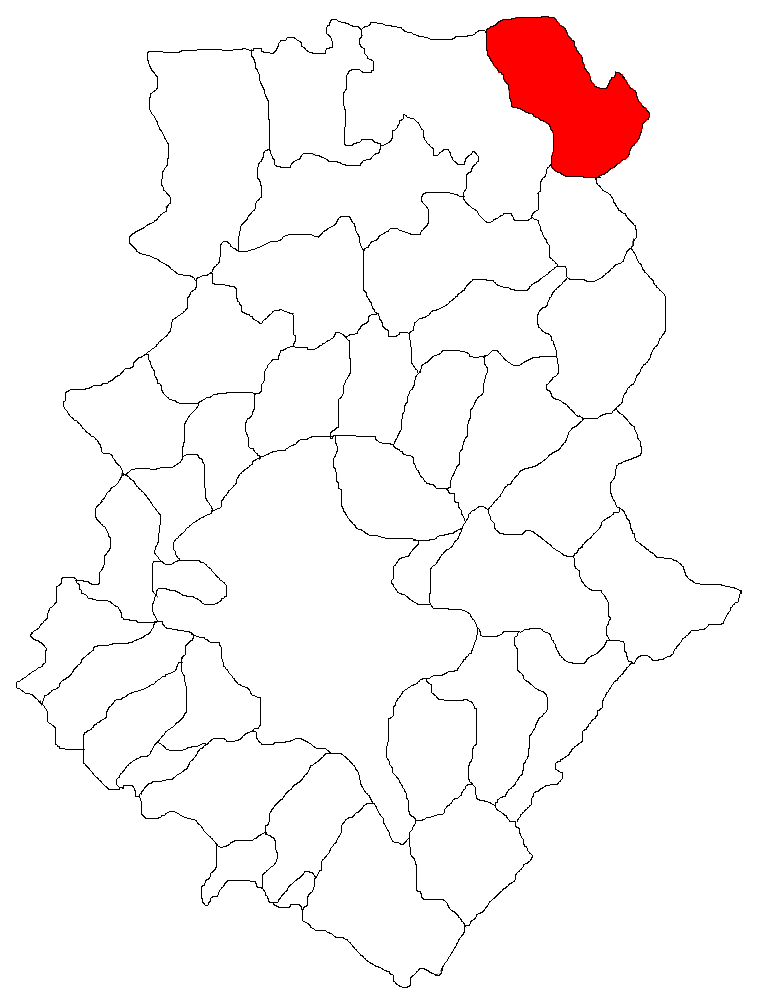
- Location in Ilfov County

- Location in Romania
- Coordinates: 44°43′N 26°18′E
- Country: Romania
- County: Ilfov

Government
  - Mayor (2020–2024): Georgel Vasile (PNL)
- Area: 52 km^{2} (20 sq mi)
- Elevation: 79 m (259 ft)
- Population (2021-12-01): 2,860
  - Density: 55/km^{2} (140/sq mi)
- Time zone: UTC+02:00 (EET)
  - Summer (DST): UTC+03:00 (EEST)
- Postal code: 077140
- Area code: +(40) 21
- Vehicle reg.: IF
- Website: primarianuciilfov.ro

Nuci is a commune in the northeastern part of Ilfov County, Muntenia, Romania. Its name means "walnut trees" in Romanian. It is composed of five villages: Balta Neagră, Merii Petchii, Micșuneștii Mari, Micșuneștii-Moară, and Nuci.

The commune is located in the northeastern corner of the county, bordering Prahova County and Ialomița County.

Historical population
Year	Pop.	±% p.a.
2002	3,141	—
2011	3,098	−0.15%
2021	2,860	−0.80%
Source: Census data

== Natives ==
- Gheorghe Chivu (born 1947), linguist and philologist
