= Marilena Dumitrescu =

Romanian politician (born 1964)

Member of the Chamber of Deputies
- In office 27 November 1996 – 30 November 2000

Personal details
- Born: 7 October 1964 (age 61)
- Party: Italian Community of Romania

Marilena Dumitrescu (born 7 October 1964) is a Romanian engineer and politician. Representing the Italian minority from Galați County, she was elected to the Chamber of Deputies in the 1996–2000 legislature.
