= Dumitru Bâșcu =

Romanian painter

Dumitru Bâșcu self-portrait

Dumitru Bâșcu (Romanian pronunciation: [dumitru bɨʃku]; alternative spelling Dimitrie Bîșcu; 14 September 1902 – 18 November 1983) was a Romanian painter. He is known for his oil paintings of still life, landscapes and portraits as well as for mural paintings, mostly church restoration and fresco painting across Romania.

Dumitru Bâșcu was born in the village of Cracalia, commune of Dumeni (later renamed George Enescu, Botoșani) in Dorohoi County at the time, today Botoșani County. He is the half-brother of musician George Enescu through his father, Costache Enescu. His mother was Maria Ferdinand Suschi of Polish origin.

He attended the Iași National School of Fine Arts from 1920 until 1924 where he had among his teachers Gheorghe Popovici and Jean Cosmovici. He then attended the Bucharest National School of Fine Arts (later renamed Bucharest National University of Arts) from 1924 until 1927 where his teachers included George Mirea and Camil Ressu.

He made his debut at the Bucharest Official Salon in 1927, winning the Simu prize. In 1929 he was awarded the Aman prize as well as the highest accolade, the ‘Travel Scholarship for Painting’, which enabled an extended study trip to France. He travelled and studied again in France and Italy in 1939.

Bâșcu exhibited his paintings regularly, including personal shows at Dalles Hall (1935) and Artistic Youth Society (1944) as well as individual works at Flacara (1947), Annual State Exhibition (1948, 1953, 1954), Bucharest Interregional Exhibition (1956), and Bucharest Fine Art Exhibition (1960). He was part of the jury of the Bucharest Official Autumn Salon in 1946. He regularly published reviews of other painters’ work.

Landscape with Spring Blossom by Dumitru Bâșcu

Bâșcu married Margareta Arvay (Kutis) in 1943. Their daughter, Ana-Maria Sandi, was born in 1945. He died in Bucharest on 18 November 1983 and is buried at Andronache cemetery.

== Bibliography ==
- Barbosa, Octavian, Dictionarul artistilor români contemporani, Editura Meridiane, 1976
- Deac, Mircea, Lexicon critic si documentar, pictori, sculptori si desenatori din Romania sec. XV-XX, Editura Medro, 2008
- Oprea, Petre, Expozanți la Saloanele Oficiale de pictură, sculptură, grafică. 1924-1944, Direcția pentru cultură, culte și patrimoniul cultural național a Municipiului București, 2004, p. 19
- Oprea, Petre, Expozanți la Saloanele Oficiale de pictură, sculptură, grafică 1945 - 1947, Directia pentru cultura, culte si patrimoniul cultural national, București 2007
- Oprea, Petre, Artiști participanți la expozițiile Societății Tinerimii Artistice (1902-1947), Maiko, București, 2006, p. 30
- Preda, Caterina (coord.) Uniunea Artistilor Plastici din Romania in documente de arhiva, Editura Universitatii Bucuresti, 2015, p. 168
