= Gheorghe Chivu =

Romanian academic (born 1947)

Gheorghe Chivu (born 7 October 1947) is a Romanian linguist and philologist, university professor and member of the Romanian Academy since 2023.

He was born in Micșuneștii Mari, Ilfov County, and attended high school in nearby Snagov.
