= Corbeanca =

- Commune
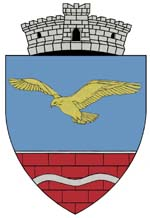
- Coat of arms

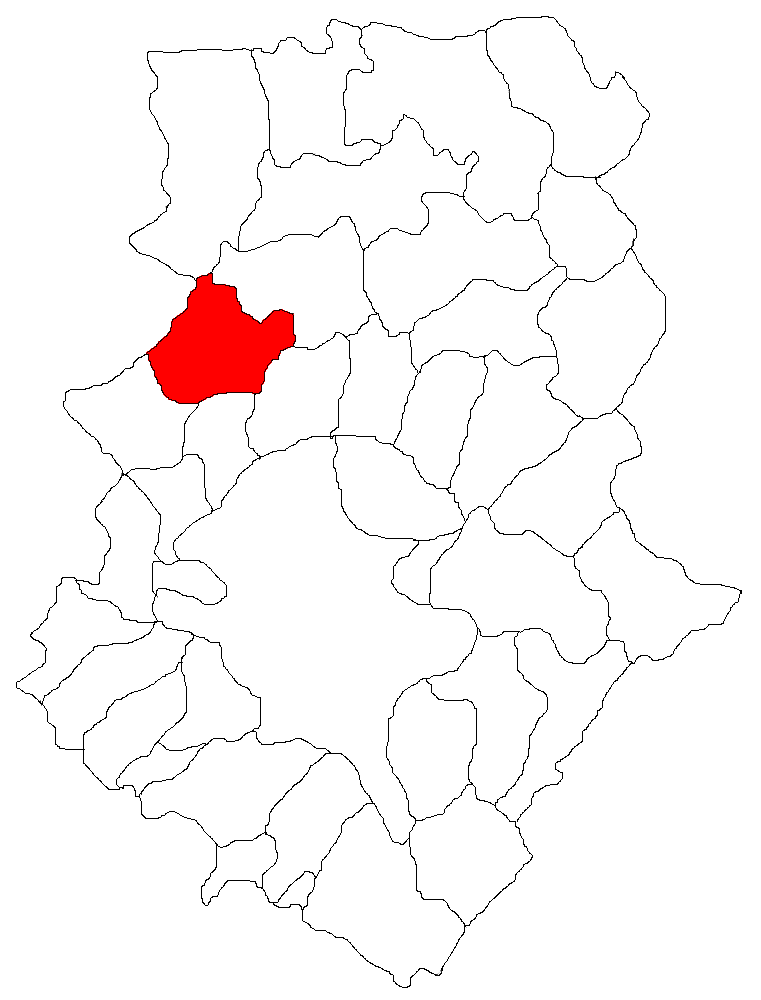
- Location in Ilfov County

- Location in Romania
- Coordinates: 44°36′N 26°3′E
- Country: Romania
- County: Ilfov

Government
  - Mayor (2024–2028): Ștefan Adrian Apăteanu (ADU)
- Area: 30.18 km^{2} (11.65 sq mi)
- Elevation: 97 m (318 ft)
- Population (2021-12-01): 11,412
  - Density: 378.1/km^{2} (979.4/sq mi)
- Time zone: UTC+02:00 (EET)
  - Summer (DST): UTC+03:00 (EEST)
- Postal code: 077065
- Area code: +(40) x1
- Vehicle reg.: IF
- Website: www.primariacorbeanca.ro

Corbeanca is a commune in the northwestern part of Ilfov County, Muntenia, Romania, on the Cociovaliștea River. It is composed of four villages: Corbeanca, Ostratu, Petrești, and Tamași.

The commune's name derives from "Corbeanu", the name of a shepherd who settled here. There are several residential neighbourhoods that have been built in Corbeanca since the late 1990s, such as Paradisul verde ("Green Paradise").

Corbeanca is linked to Bucharest's public transport system through regional bus route R441 and R446.

Historical population
Year	Pop.	±%
2002	3,718	—
2011	7,072	+90.2%
2021	11,412	+61.4%
Source: Census data
