= Vlăsia =

- Location within Romania

Location
- Country: Romania
- Counties: Dâmbovița, Ilfov

Physical characteristics
- Mouth: Cociovaliștea
  - location: Grădiștea
  - coordinates: 44.674°N 26.268°E
- Length: 35 km (22 mi)
- Basin size: 77 km^{2} (30 sq mi)

Basin features
- Progression: Cociovaliștea→ Ialomița→ Danube→ Black Sea

The Vlăsia is a left tributary of the river Cociovaliștea in Romania. It discharges into the Cociovaliștea in Lake Căldărușani near Grădiștea. Its length is 35 km (22 mi) and its basin size is 77 km^{2} (30 sq mi).
