= Snagov Palace =

Building in Snagov, Romania

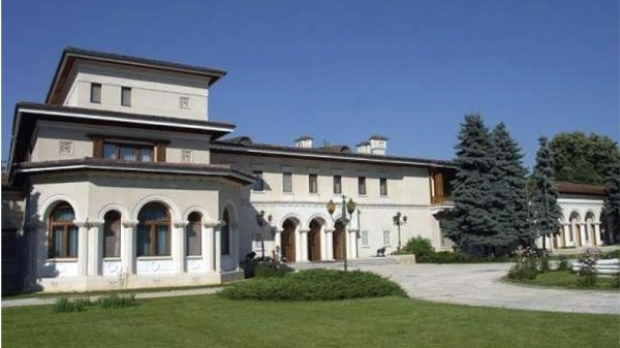
Snagov Palace today.

Snagov Palace (Romanian: Palatul Snagov) is a former royal palace on the shore of Lake Snagov, about 40 km north-east of Bucharest, in Ilfov County, Romania. The palace is situated in the commune of Snagov and near the Snagov Monastery.

Snagov Palace was built in the early 1930s by Henrieta Delavrancea-Gibory for prince Nicholas of Romania, brother of King Carol II. It was built on the grounds of the royal hunting lodge Scroviște, which dated from the 19th century. The new palace was constructed in the Romanian Brâncovenesc style and completed in 1932.

The palace has a formal garden with fountains, which was landscaped by the Austrian landscape architect Rebhun. In the garden there is a former guesthouse in Romanian Arts and Crafts-style, built in the beginning of the 20th century.

Prince Nicholas hardly used the palace due to a conflict with the king about his morganatic marriage and his expulsion from Romania in 1937. After his departure the palace was meant to be used by politicians, artists and writers, but was hardly used. After 1940 it was occasionally used by the Romanian dictator Ion Antonescu as a summer residence.

During the communist era (1945–1989), Snagov Palace was occasionally used as a residence by the General Secretary of the Romanian Communist Party Gheorghe Gheorghiu-Dej. His successor Nicolae Ceauşescu rebuilt the palace in the 1980s after plans of professor Nicholas Vladescu, which took seven years, as a residence for himself and his wife Elena and for government meetings and state visits.

During the early days of the Romanian Revolution of 1989 Ceauşescu and his wife and a small group fled on December 22 from the headquarters of the Communist Party (CC building) by helicopter to Snagov Palace, where they stayed for a brief moment. From his presidential suite Ceauşescu discussed by phone with several civilian and military authorities the confused situation in the country. Afterwards he departed from the palace by helicopter in the direction of Piteşti, where he and his wife eventually were captured and brought to Târgoviște. It is suspected that Ceauşescu took some valuables from the palace when he left for the last time.

After the revolution the palace was not claimed by the royal family. Nowadays the palace is rented for various events, such as conferences, official banquets and wedding-parties.
