= Izvorani =

Izvorani may refer to several villages in Romania:

- Izvorani, a village in the town of Ștefănești, Argeș County
- Izvorani, a village in Ciolpani Commune, Ilfov County
