= Snagov =

- Commune
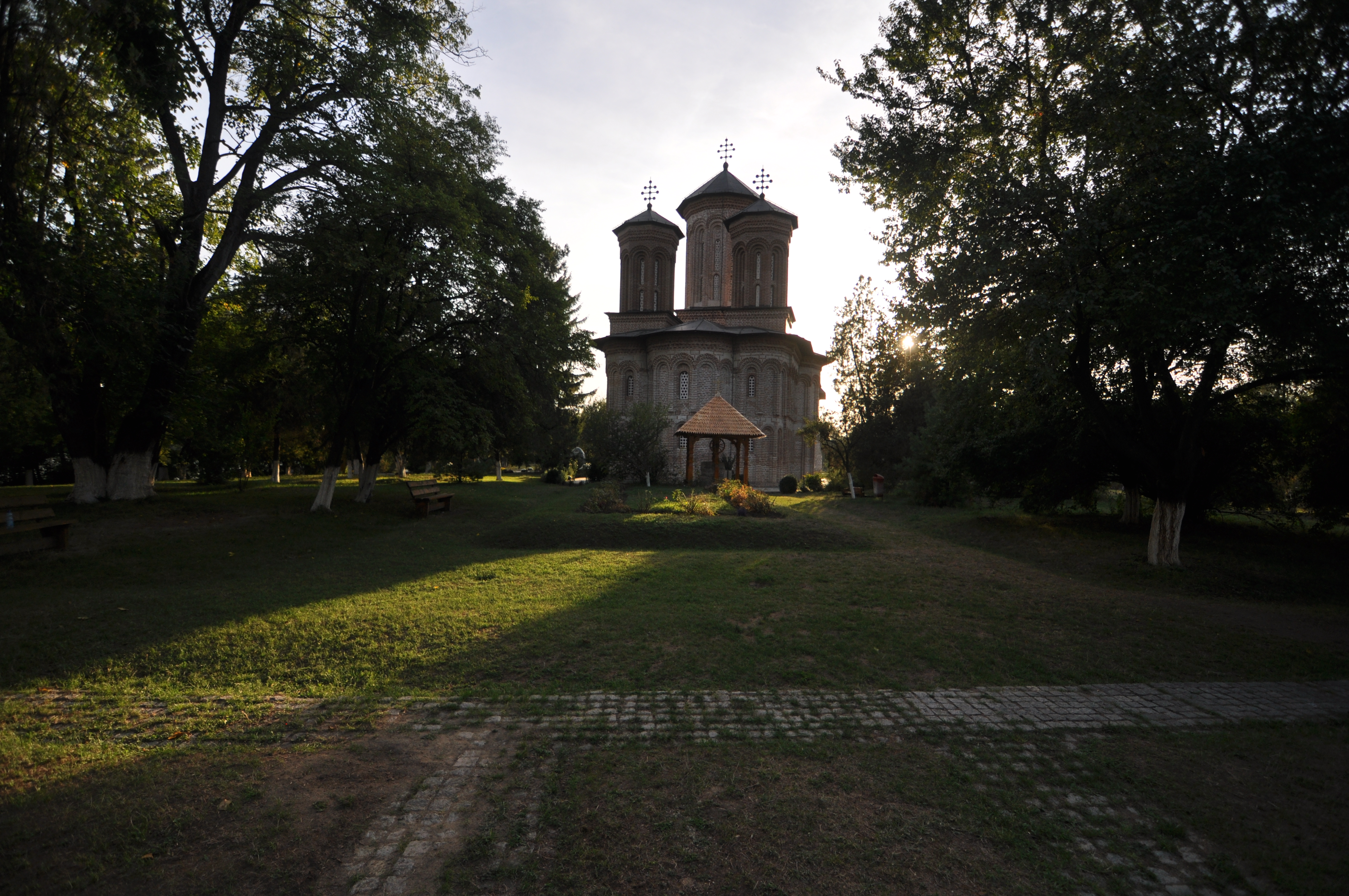
- The Snagov Monastery

- Flag Coat of arms

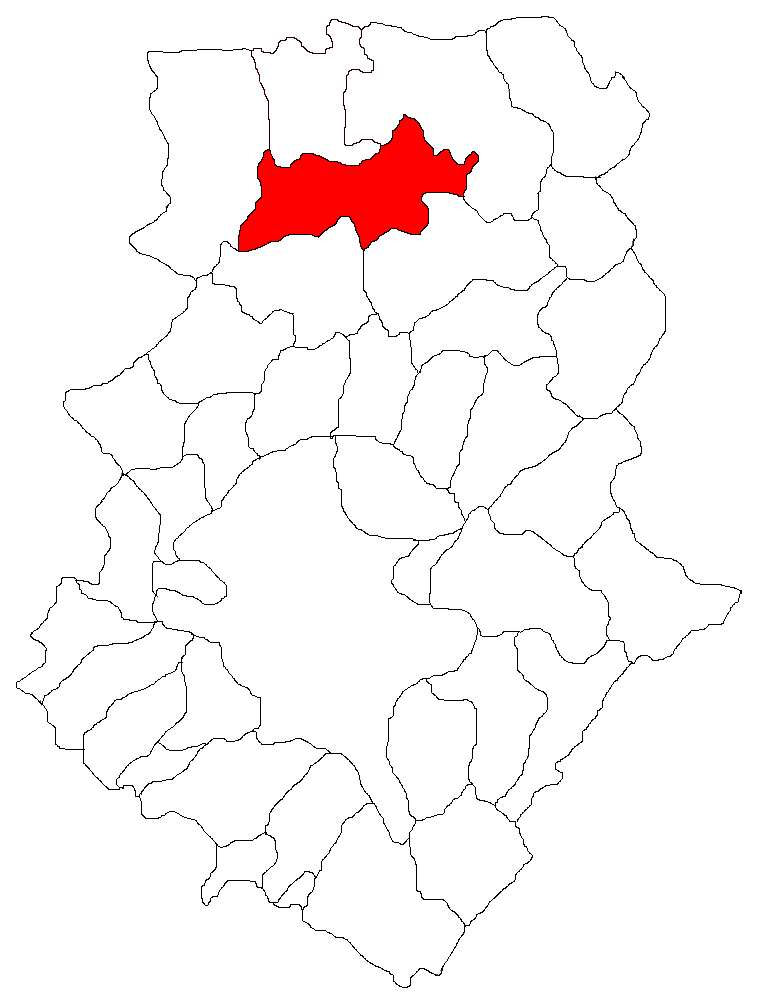
- Location in Ilfov County

- Location in Romania
- Coordinates: 44°42′32″N 26°10′17″E
- Country: Romania
- County: Ilfov

Government
  - Mayor (2020–2024): Mihai Anghel (PNL)
- Area: 88 km^{2} (34 sq mi)
- Elevation: 91 m (299 ft)
- Population (2021-12-01): 8,331
  - Density: 95/km^{2} (250/sq mi)
- Time zone: UTC+02:00 (EET)
  - Summer (DST): UTC+03:00 (EEST)
- Postal code: 077165
- Area code: +(40) 21
- Vehicle reg.: IF
- Website: primaria-snagov.ro

Snagov is a commune, located 40 km (25 mi) north of Bucharest, in Ilfov County, Muntenia, Romania. The commune is composed of five villages: Ciofliceni, Ghermănești, Snagov, Tâncăbești, and Vlădiceasca. Snagov is a tourist and spa resort, but the necessary infrastructure has regressed after 1989. At the 2021 census, the commune had a population of 8,331.

== Name ==
The name "Snagov" is of Slavic origin, from the word sneg (meaning "snow"). The area of today's commune along with surrounding lands has had this name since at least 1408.

== Geography ==
Snagov is located on the Wallachian Plain, on the shore of Lake Snagov (biggest natural lake in Romania: 600 hectares (2 1/4 mi^{2}), 16 km (9.9 mi)long), which is still partially surrounded by old oak forest (remnants of Codrii Vlăsiei).

== History ==
=== Antiquity ===
Archaeologists confirmed human presence of inhabitants since 400 BC.

=== Early medieval history and the feudal estate ===
Snagov village was built around Lake Snagov and Snagov Monastery, founded in the late 14th century on an islet in Lake Snagov, about 2 km (1.2 mi) north of Snagov village. The first written record of it is found in a document from the court of Mircea cel Bătrân and dated 1408.

=== The modern settlement ===
Snagov monastery was excavated in 1933 by archaeologist Dinu V. Rosetti.

== Tourism ==
Cultural attractions include the Snagov Monastery, Snagov Palace, several monuments, the Snagov Museum, a set of four local traditions (fishing, braiding of vegetable fibers, pottery, traditional fabrics).

Natural attractions are associated with two protected natural areas, Snagov Lake (100–150 ha; approx. 300 acres) and Snagov Forest (10 hectares (25 acres), which are included in the Snagov Natural Complex Reserve. With an area of 1,147.7 hectares (4 1/2 mi^{2}), the nature reserve was established in 1952 and includes all the forests on the shore of the lake.

Also in Snagov one can find a Tourist Information Center, a Rental Center (bicycles, kayaks), a Biodiversity Center, and a site with the entire Snagov Eco-tourism Offer (attractions, activities, circuits, audio guides, etc.)

== Events ==
- 25 June 1933: The National Celebration of Water day, with King Carol II, Michael I, Nicolae Iorga, Iuliu Maniu, Dimitrie Gusti, Grigore Antipa and many other top officials, as well as Liga Navală Română, Cercetașii României and representatives of the local community in attendance. This is the reason for celebrating the day of Lake Snagov on June 25, when Romanians also celebrate "Sânzienele/Drăgaica".
- 23 August 1944: Ion Antonescu left Snagov Palace in order to go to Bucharest at the request of King Michael I, where he was arrested during the Royal Coup. Manfred von Killinger, who was also staying at a nearby villa on the shore of Lake Snagov, committed suicide soon after, because he failed to maintain Romania on the side of Nazi Germany, as requested by Adolf Hitler.
- 1962 to 1972: Regata Snagov was an international rowing competition held between 1962 and 1972.
- 2002: The Romanian government decided to build at Snagov a Disneyland-style theme park, called "Dracula Park"; the project was canceled in 2006. The connection with "Dracula" is due to a spurious 19th-century tradition that makes Snagov Monastery the site of the tomb of Vlad the Impaler.
- 4–5 April 2003: An informal meeting of the prime ministers of the seven states invited to join the NATO alliance was held at Snagov Palace.
- 25 June 2008: A pedestrian footbridge was struck by a tipper lorry, which was lifted and then collapsed onto a moving car, killing a 21-year-old woman driving towards Bucharest and a male passenger. The footbridge has not been rebuilt since then, and the stairways were left as a memorial to the death of the victim, and a new footbridge was built further away from the original one.
- 2016: Protection of the natural area (heritage) was reinforced by "The management plan and the ANPLS regulation" published in the Official Gazette.

Historical population
Year	Pop.	±% p.a.
2002	6,041	—
2011	7,272	+2.08%
2021	8,331	+1.37%
Source: Census data

== Notable people ==
Romanian president Nicolae Ceaușescu and his entourage used Snagov as a vacation retreat. Over 50 heads of state, prime ministers, top politicians from more than 40 states, crossed Lake Snagov with the "Snagov 1" luxury boat (today called "Leader"). In Snagov, at the film studios Castel Film Romania, over 250 films were produced. At the Snagov Museum, collections are presented about 130 personalities related to Snagov.

== Twin towns/sister cities ==
Initiated but not yet implemented - with: Port of Le Havre from France and Sarkad from Hungary, Gandiaye village from Senegal.

== Notable sites ==
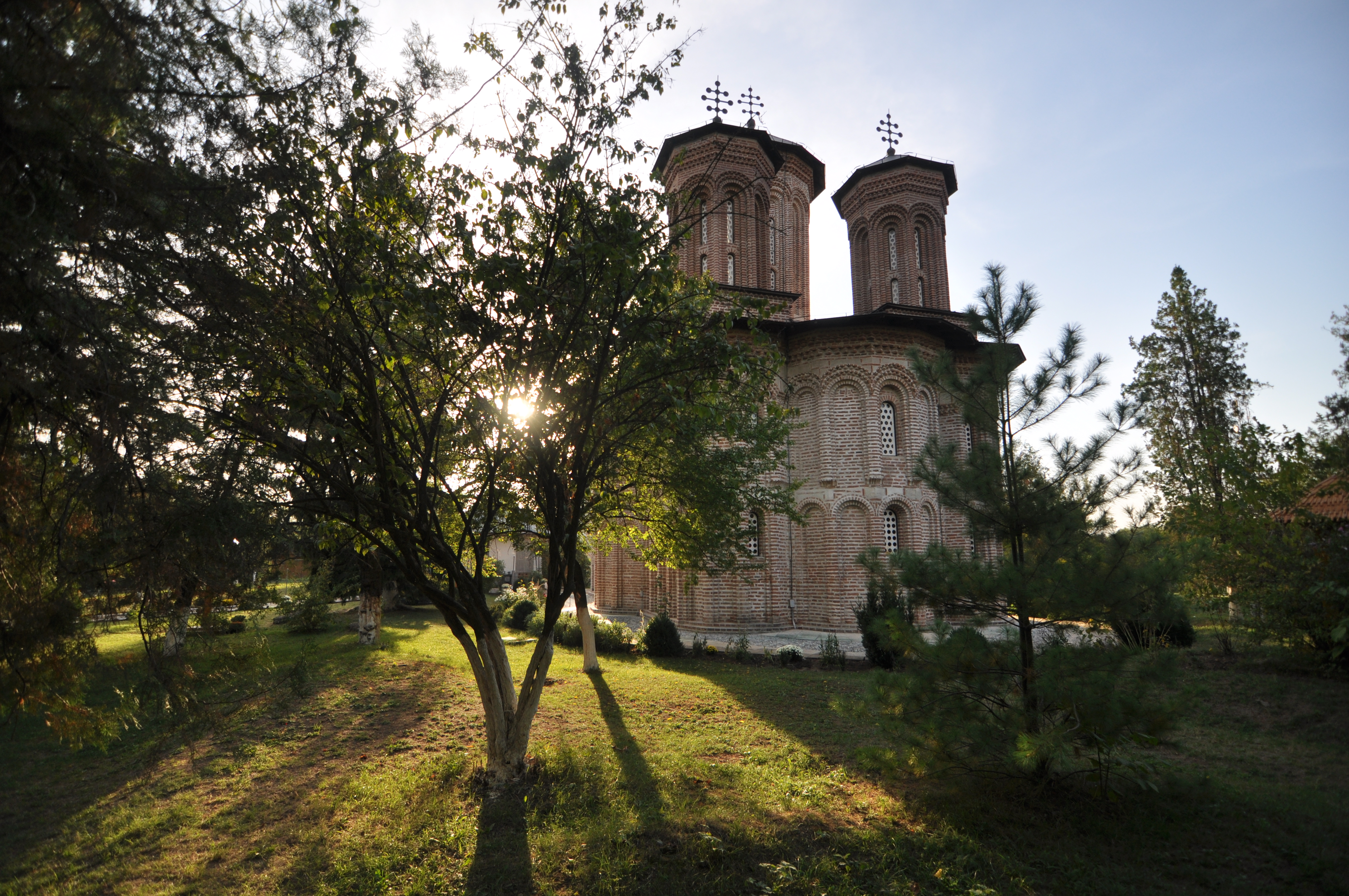
Snagov monastery

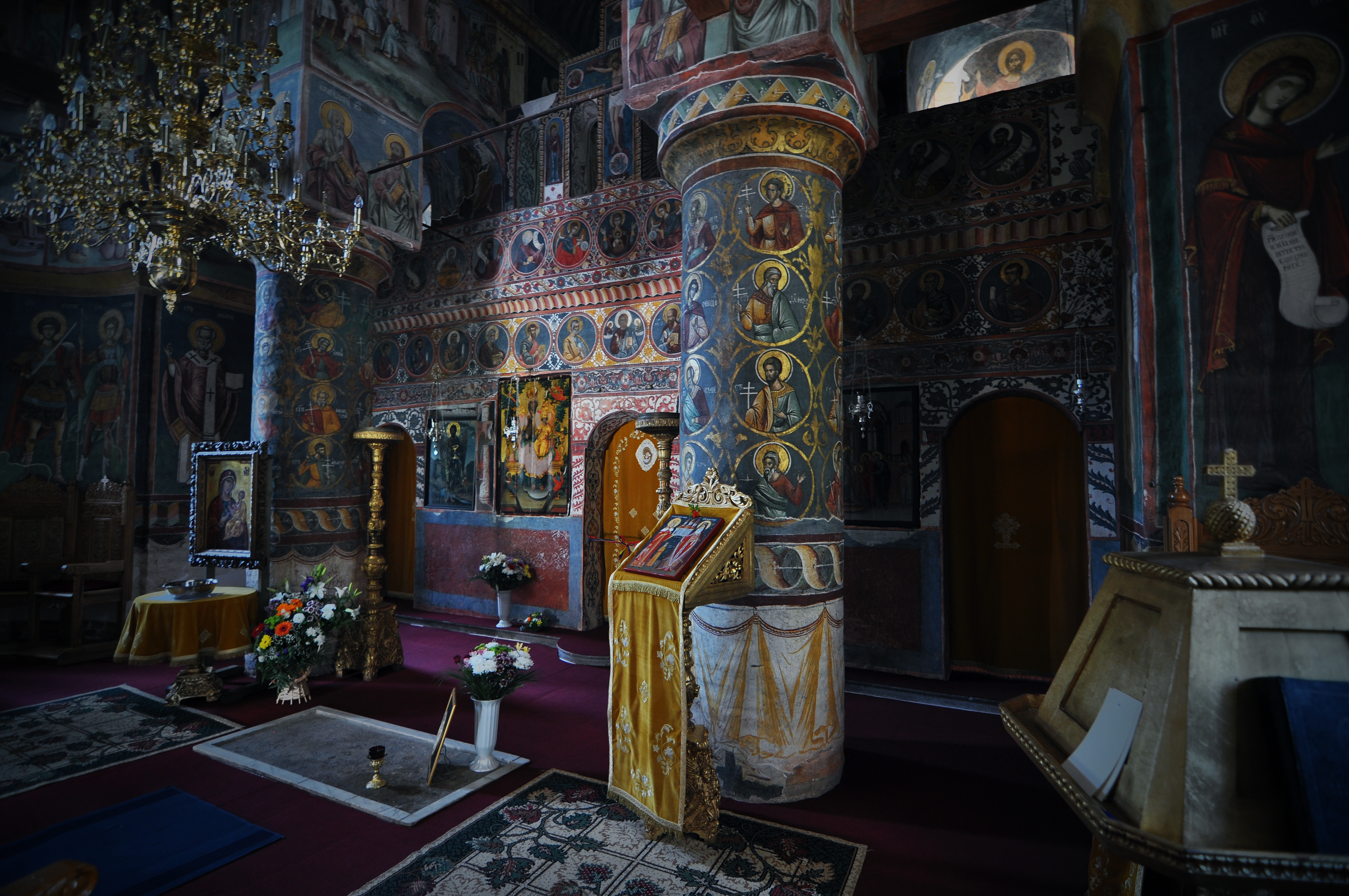
Snagov monastery -interior

- Snagov Monastery – first mentioned by 1438.
- Snagov Palace – built by Prince Nicholas of Romania in 1928.
- Yacht Club Snagov (1928), transformed in Baza Veche (1948), currently named Complexul Sportiv Național Nicolae Navasart, where there exist 4 statues of relevant personalities from Romanian nautical sports.
- Snagov Park and Snagov Beach – built by Dem I. Dobrescu, Mayor of Bucharest, in 1930.
- The Imre Nagy monument. Between 1956 and 1957, the prime minister of Hungary was kept for a few months in Snagov before being sent to trial and executed in Budapest.
- Siliștea Snagovului, the old church built-in 1664.
- Snagov Museum, inaugurated in 2008.
- Snagov Stadium, a football stadium seating 2,000.
- The Tâncăbești transmitter – a medium wave broadcasting station, near Tâncăbești, built by 1949, which uses as antenna a 187 m (614 ft) tall guyed mast radiator. Works on 855 kHz used before the 1990s a transmission power of 1,500 kW. Today it may be 300 kW.
