= Snagov Monastery =

Romanian historical monument

- Mănăstirea Snagov
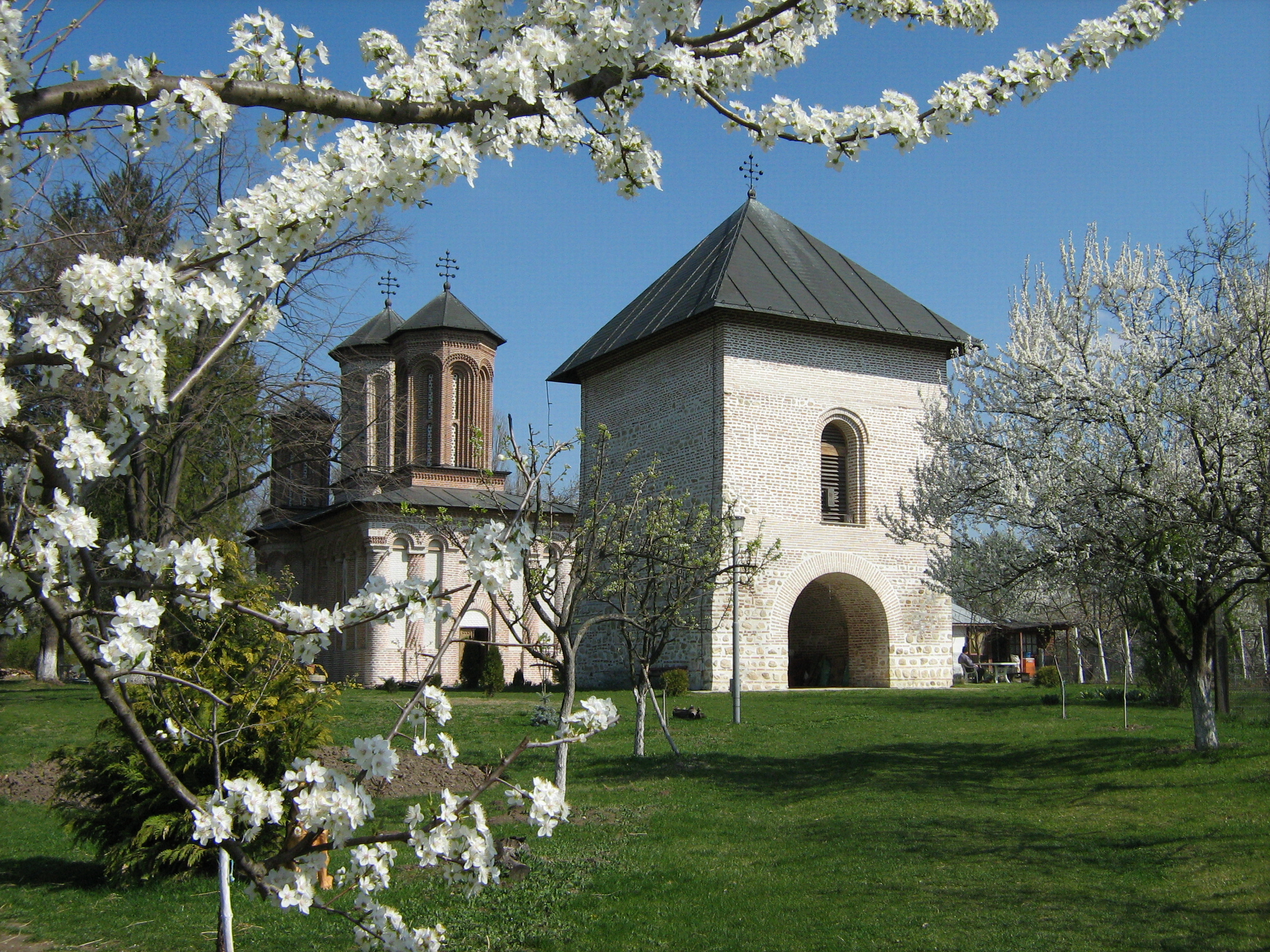
- The Snagov Monastery in 2008

- Location within Romania
- Interactive map of Snagov Monastery

Monastery information
- Other name: Vlad Țepeș Monastery
- Denomination: Romanian Orthodox
- Established: 1408
- Dedication: Vlad the Impaler; Neagoe Basarab; Anthim the Iberian; Annunciation

People
- Founder: Mircea the Elder

Architecture
- Architect: Mircea the Elder; Vlad III; Neagoe Basarab
- Style: Byzantine
- Completion date: 1408

Site
- Location: Snagov, Ilfov
- Country: Romania
- Coordinates: 44°43′46.32″N 26°10′32.622″E
- Public access: yes

The Snagov Monastery (Romanian: Mănăstirea Snagov), also known as the Vlad Țepeș Monastery (Romanian: Mănăstirea Vlad Țepeș) is a medieval monastery and important historical monument located in southern Romania in the county of Ilfov, on an island in the northern reaches of Lake Snagov, belonging to the commune of Snagov, and in geographical proximity to the village of Siliștea Snagovului, in the Gruiu commune.

An old center of Orthodox spirituality and culture, it stands on the foundations of an old Thracian settlement.

The monastery is probably one of the late foundations of Mircea the Elder, being first documented in 1408. It has been rebuilt several times by other rulers, among whom we can mention Vlad Țepeș, Mircea Ciobanul, and Neagoe Basarab.

Currently, only the church, the bell tower and a fountain are still standing. The other buildings on the island are either recently built, or old ruins.

The church has two patron saints, Saint Voivode Neagoe Basarab, the founder of the current church, and Saint Anthim the Iberian, abbot of the monastery. Their feast days are the 26 and 27 September, respectively. The church also celebrates the Presentation of Mary on 21 November.

The island was ceded free of charge to the Romanian Patriarchate by the commune of Snagov and it is currently administered by the Archdiocese of Bucharest.

== History ==
=== General history ===
The first written documentary attestation that mentions this monastery dates from the second half of the XIVth century, during the reigns of Dan I (1383-1386) and Mircea the Elder (1386-1418). In 1453, Vladislav II built a chapel dedicated to the Annunciation, however, local legends says that it sunk into Lake Snagov around the year 1600. The imperial doors from this first chapel were discovered on the shore of the lake further away, and are nowadays kept at the National Art Museum of Romania.

Around the year 1456, a prison was built on the island, along with defense walls, and a bridge connecting the island to the mainland, with orders from Vlad III. it functioned until around 1856, being used by Wallachian Voivodes to imprison traitors and thieves. There are tunnels underneath the island, apparently also made during the reign of Vlad III, which lead to the mainland.

In the nave, in front of the royal doors, lies the funeral slab of the voivode Vlad the Impaler, who was killed in 1476, in the forests near Ciolpani.

The current church on the island was built by Neagoe Basarab in 1521, after the original building from centuries ago was destroyed after an earthquake.

The church underwent major renovations during the reign of Mircea Ciobanu, in the middle of the XVIth century. The walls were painted during the reign of Petru Șchiopul in 1563, by Dobromir the Young. This original painting is nowadays preserved only in the narthex. In the nave and altar, the current painting was made in 1815, by Gheorghe Zugravul. The church was used as a royal necropolis, the tombstones of some governors who were beheaded for treason or forced to become monks for the same reason are kept on the island. People such as Dragomir Postelnicul, Stoica Logofatul, Pârvu Vornicul, Ioan Clugarul, and the metropolitan Serafim.

The monastery established itself as a pan-Orthodox center thanks to the support of Matei Basarab, who constructed a printing press in 1643. During the time of Constantin Brâncoveanu. From 1694 to 1705, the abbot of the monastery was Anthim the Iberian, who later became metropolitan of Wallachia. Here, he printed church books in Romanian, Greek, Arabic, Old Church Slavonic, and Georgian, which brought the fame of the craftsmen from Snagov to Greece, Asia Minor and Egypt.

There was a convent of nuns on the island until 1810, when Metropolitan Filitis abolished it, by moving the nuns to the Țigănești Monastery.

Following archaeological research in 1933, it was discovered that a first monastic settlement existed here in the 11th century, which ultimately burned down, due to it being constructed from wood.

The church was damaged by the earthquakes of 1977 and 1986, and was ultimately repaired between 1998 and 2000.

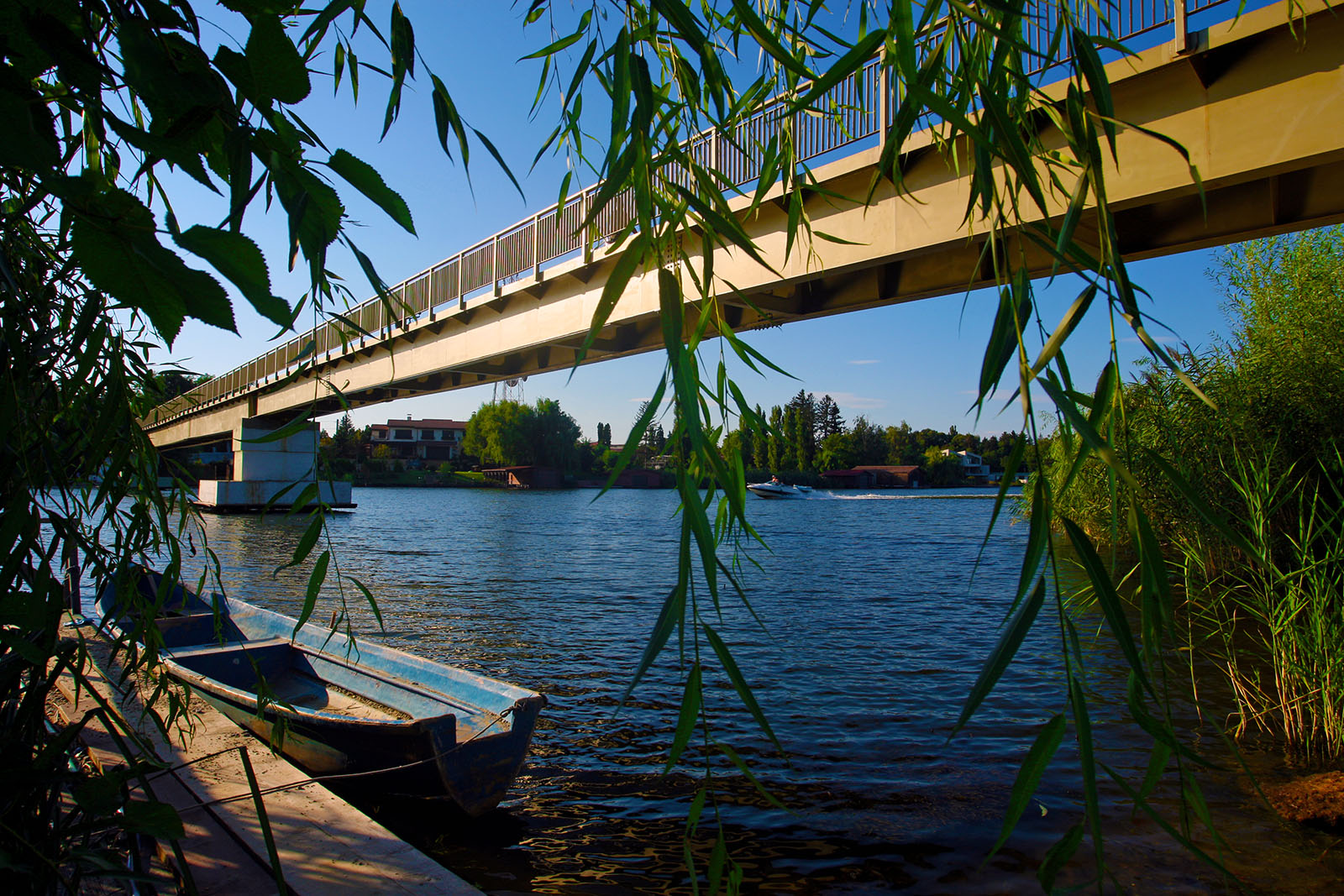
New bridge connecting the island to the mainland

=== Place of culture and art ===
During its long active history, the monastery was an important monastic center as well as a cultural center, as the ruler Constantin Brâncoveanu established one of his best quality printing presses here. Among others, the printing house was led by Anthim the Iberian, who printed the first books in Romanian with Latin characters. Thus, the first book with Latin letters of the modern Romanian language was "The Order of the Service of Saints Constantine and Elena".

Among other things, the Snagov Monastery housed special material and cultural values at different times. The monastery housed for long periods of time one of the only coin minting centers in Wallachia.

=== Strategic position ===
Due to its remarkable strategic position, being built on an island of a lake in the middle of a huge forest, Snagov Monastery often functioned as a place of refuge and exile. For example, after the suppression of the 1848 Revolution in Wallachia, the leaders of the revolution, including Mitiță Filipescu, were detained on the island.

The bridge built of oak, which connected the island to the mainland, was burned down during a revolution in 1821, and was never rebuilt, until 2009, when a modern pedestrian walkway was built.

=== Resting place of Vlad the Impaler ===
The monastery is also famous because of the burial place of Vlad Țepeș in its premises. This is the belief of the locals, to which were also added the opinions of specialists Alexandru Odobescu and Nicolae Iorga. According to the legend, after the death of Vlad Țepeș, which occurred after the battle with the Ottoman Empire in 1476 (who had supported the Dănești in obtaining the throne of Wallachia), the monks of the monastery would have found and hidden the ruler's body. Respectively, they would have given him a Christian burial after the "cleaning of the waters". The funeral would have taken place secretly and without any pomp because of the new ruler installed by the Ottomans, who was from the House of Dănești.

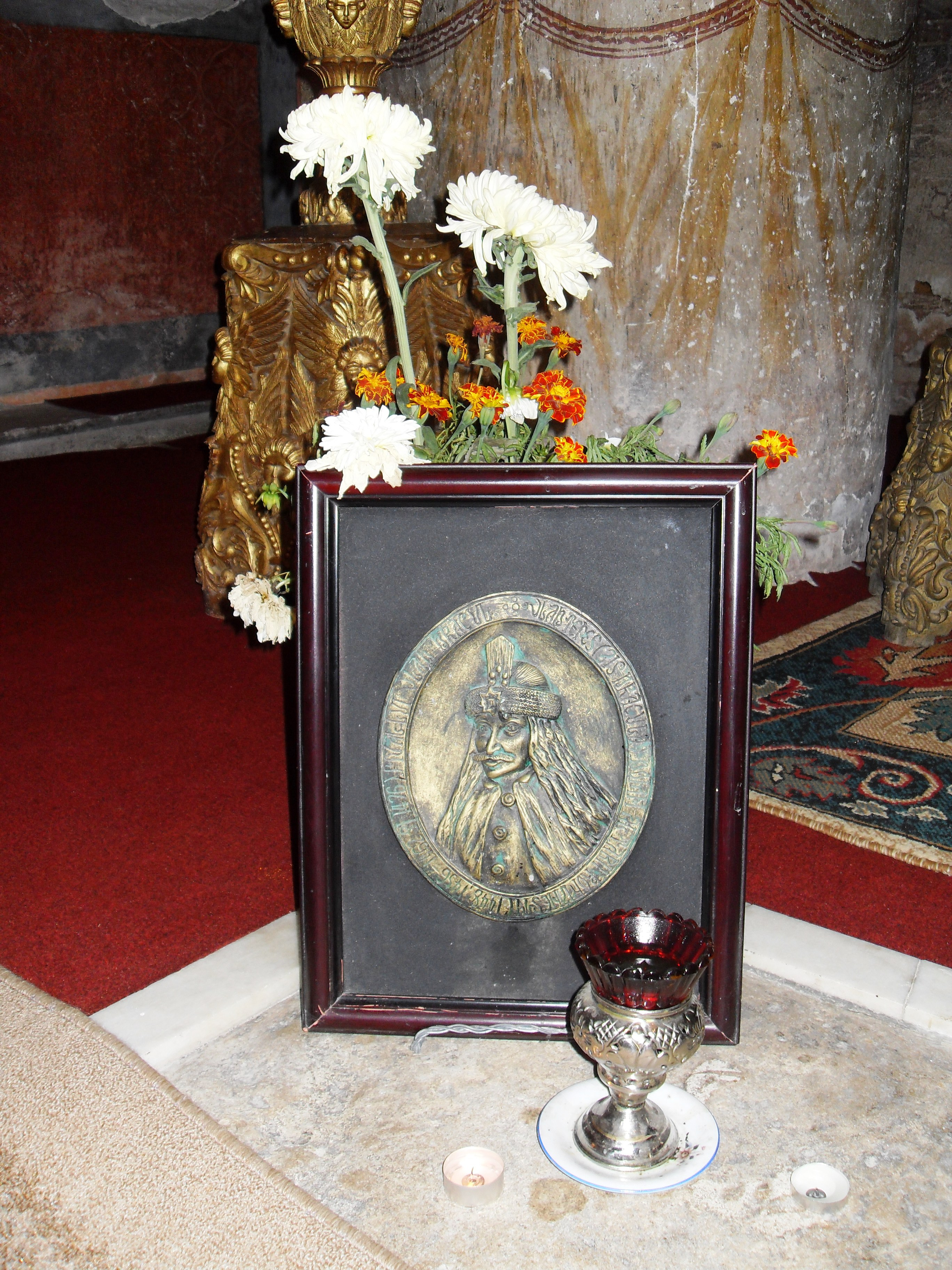
Final resting place of Vlad the Impaler

The tomb in front of the altar, researched by archaeologist Dinu Rosetti between 1933 and 1934, no longer contained anything. There are two theories about this. The first theory suggests that the remains were stolen and moved to another place. Another theory, more supported by locals, suggests that due to the watery, swampy conditions of the island, the voivode's body quickly decomposed, and thus nothing is left, as his remains became one with Lake Snagov. Another coffin was found close by, with a clothed body and accompanied by several objects - specific to a ruler. However, these disappeared after they were taken to the History Museum in Bucharest, before analysis could be done.

There are also historians who state that his grave could rather be at his foundation in Comana, Giurgiu, however, there are no sources that discuss this as a possibility.

== Description ==
The church is built in Byzantine style with Romanian decorative elements. The exterior is made from exposed bricks. The church has a balcony, nave and altar. The balcony was supported by 16 pillars of various geometric shapes, decorated with exposed bricks. They can be seen on the outside of the pronaos. The grand belfry is made out of river stone and exposed bricks.

== Gallery ==
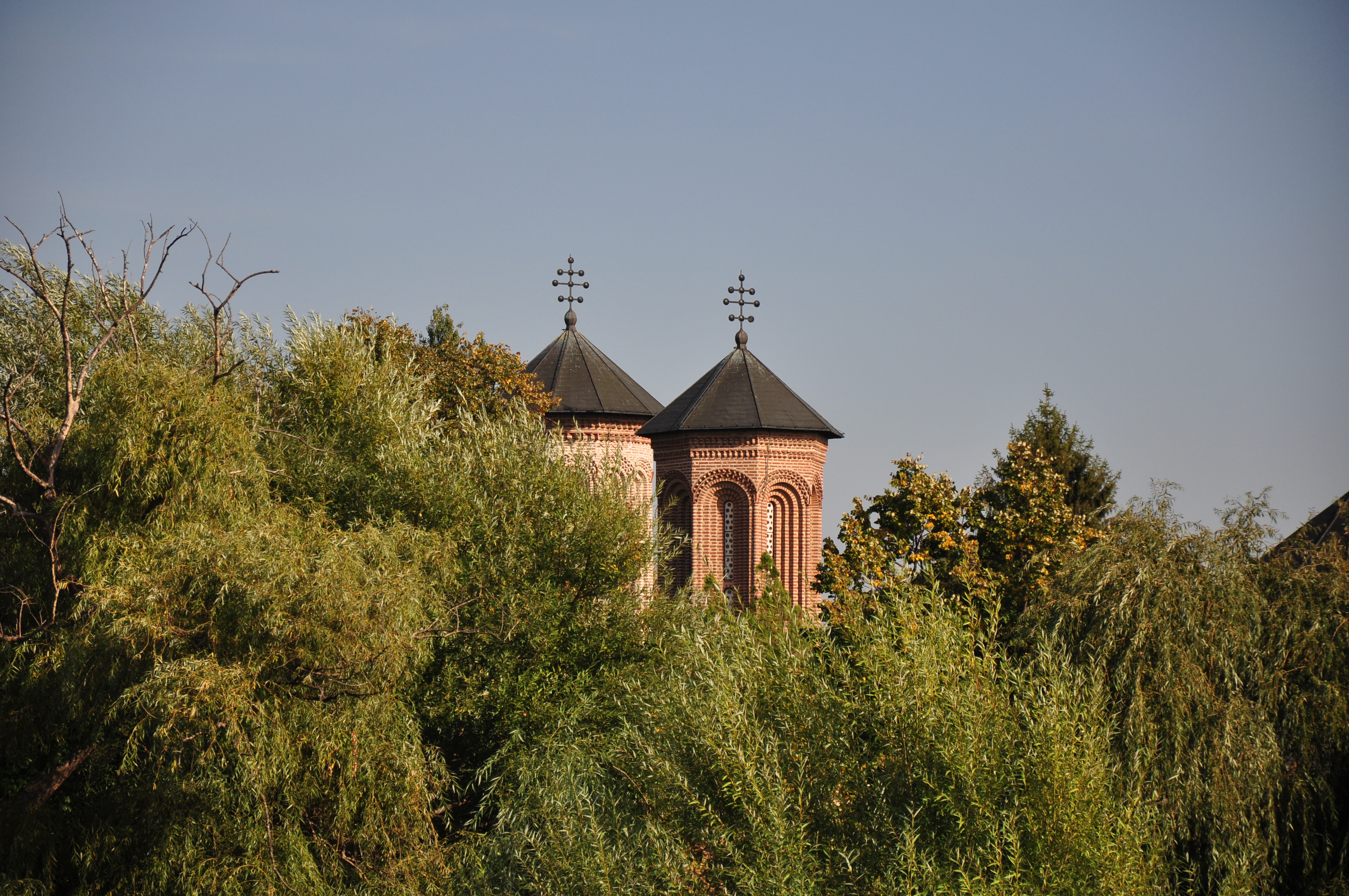

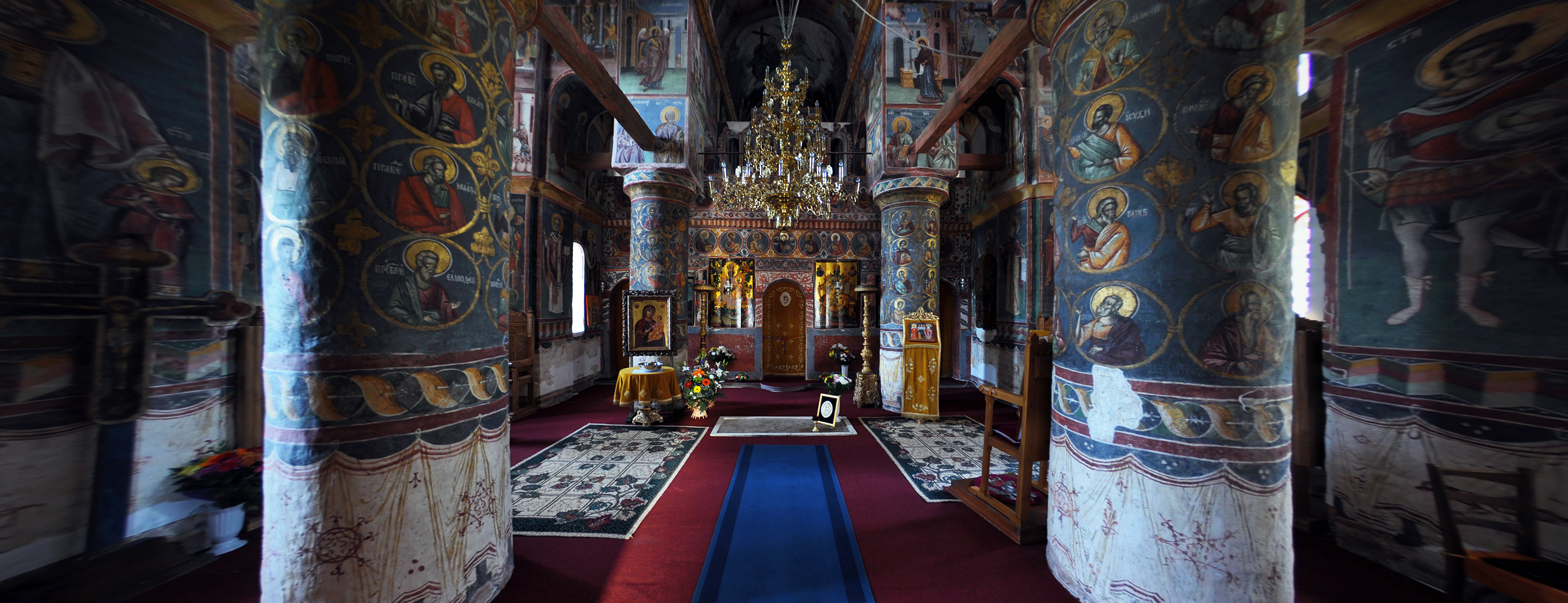

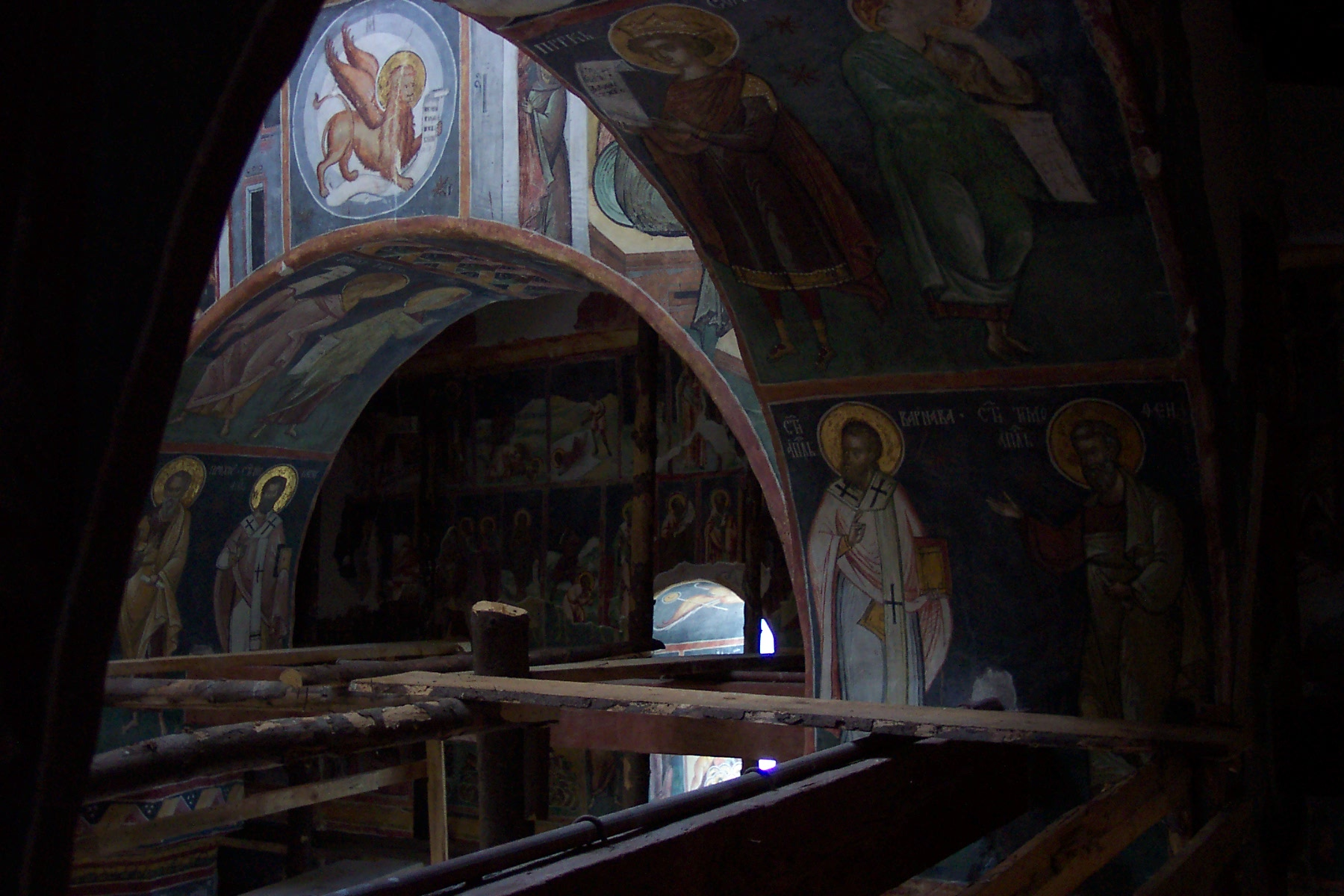

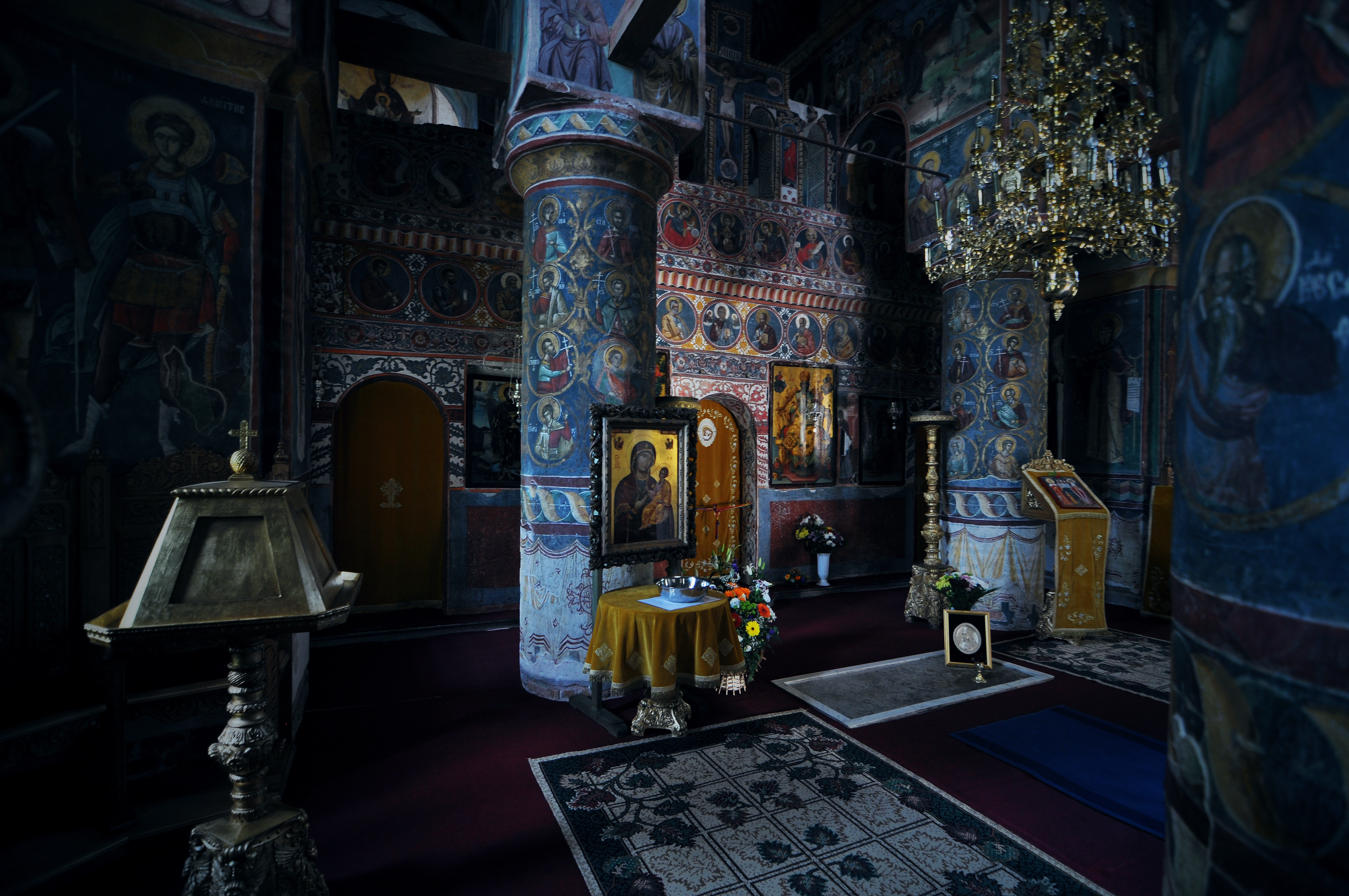

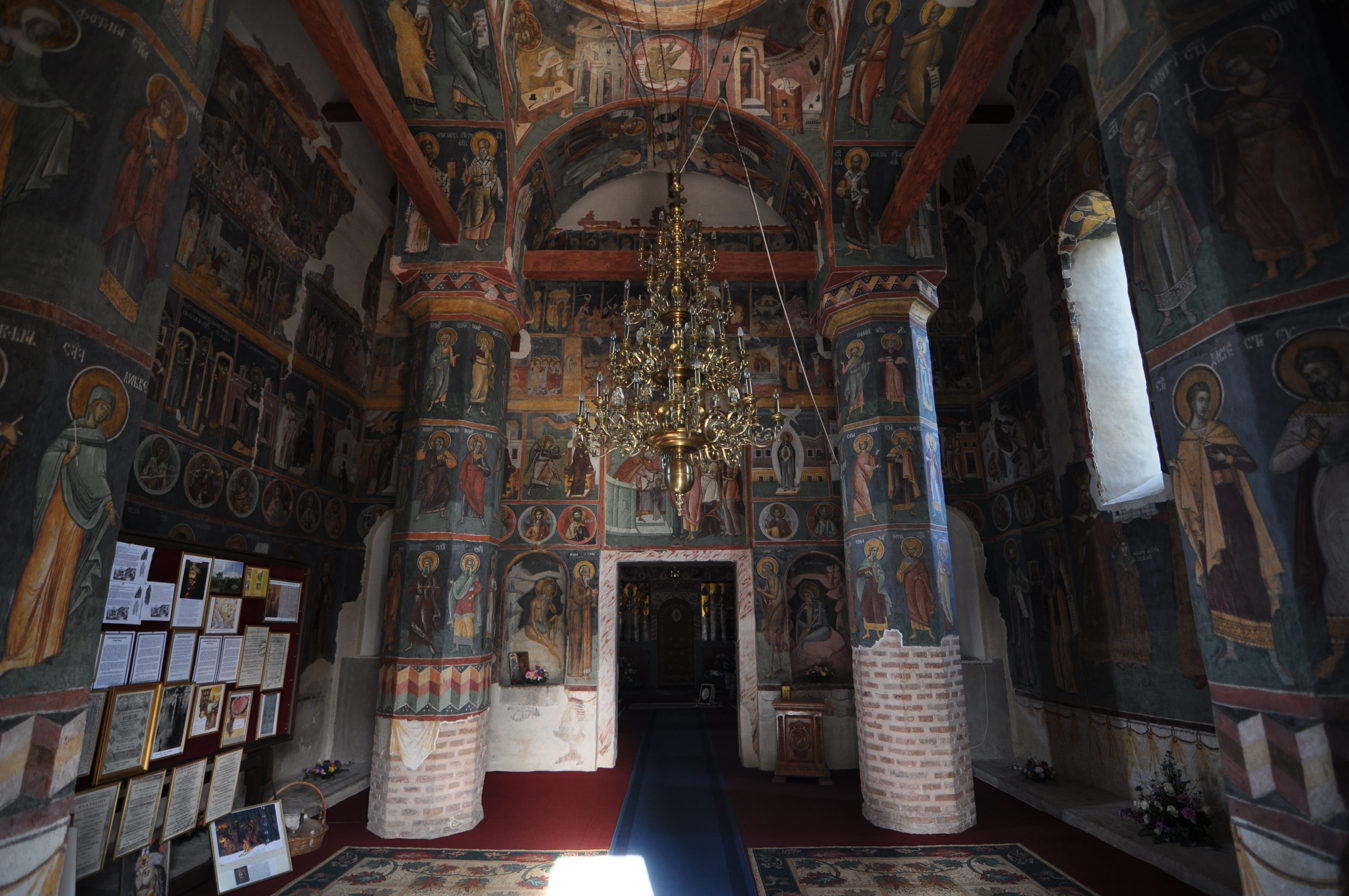

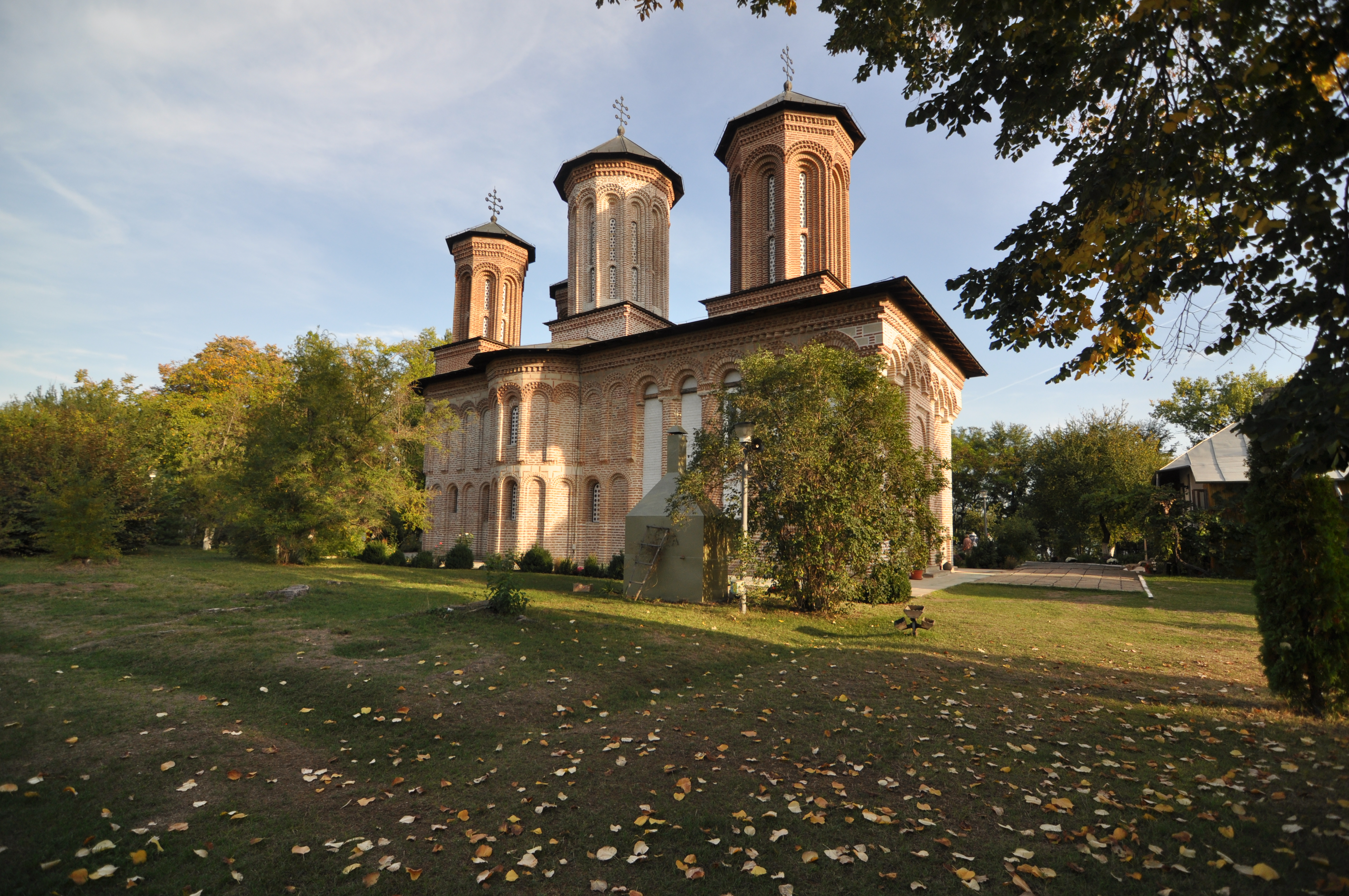

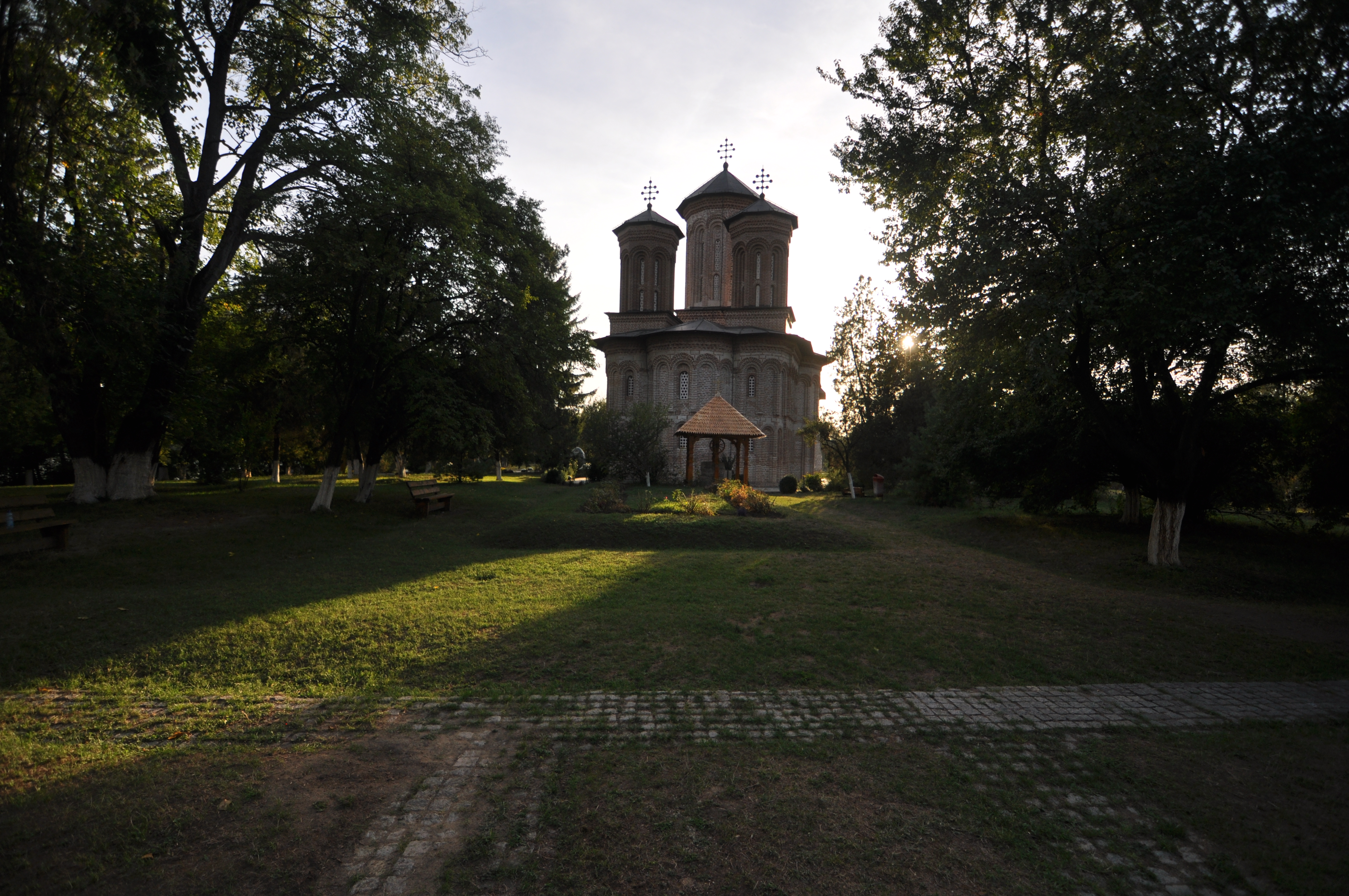

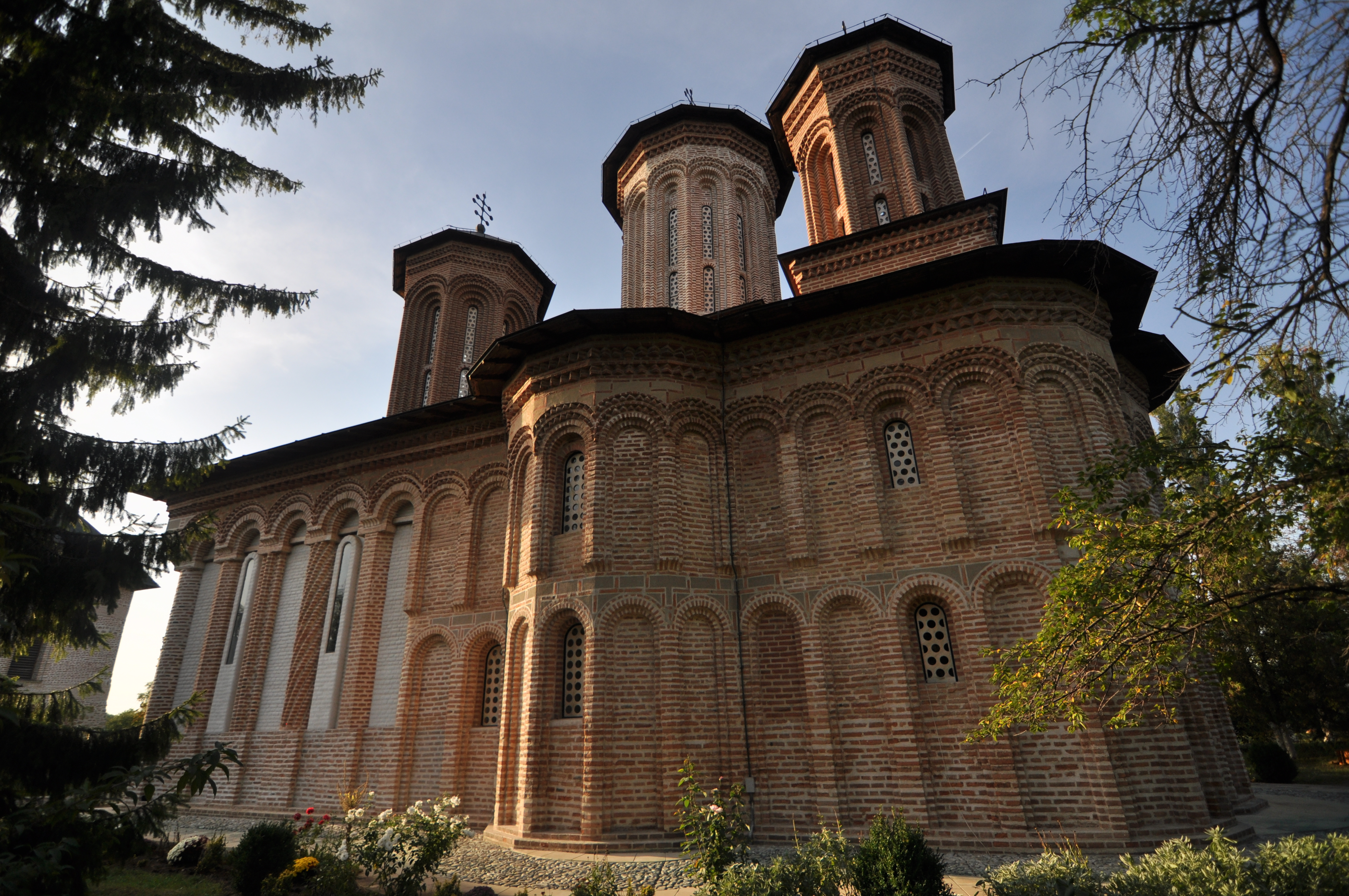

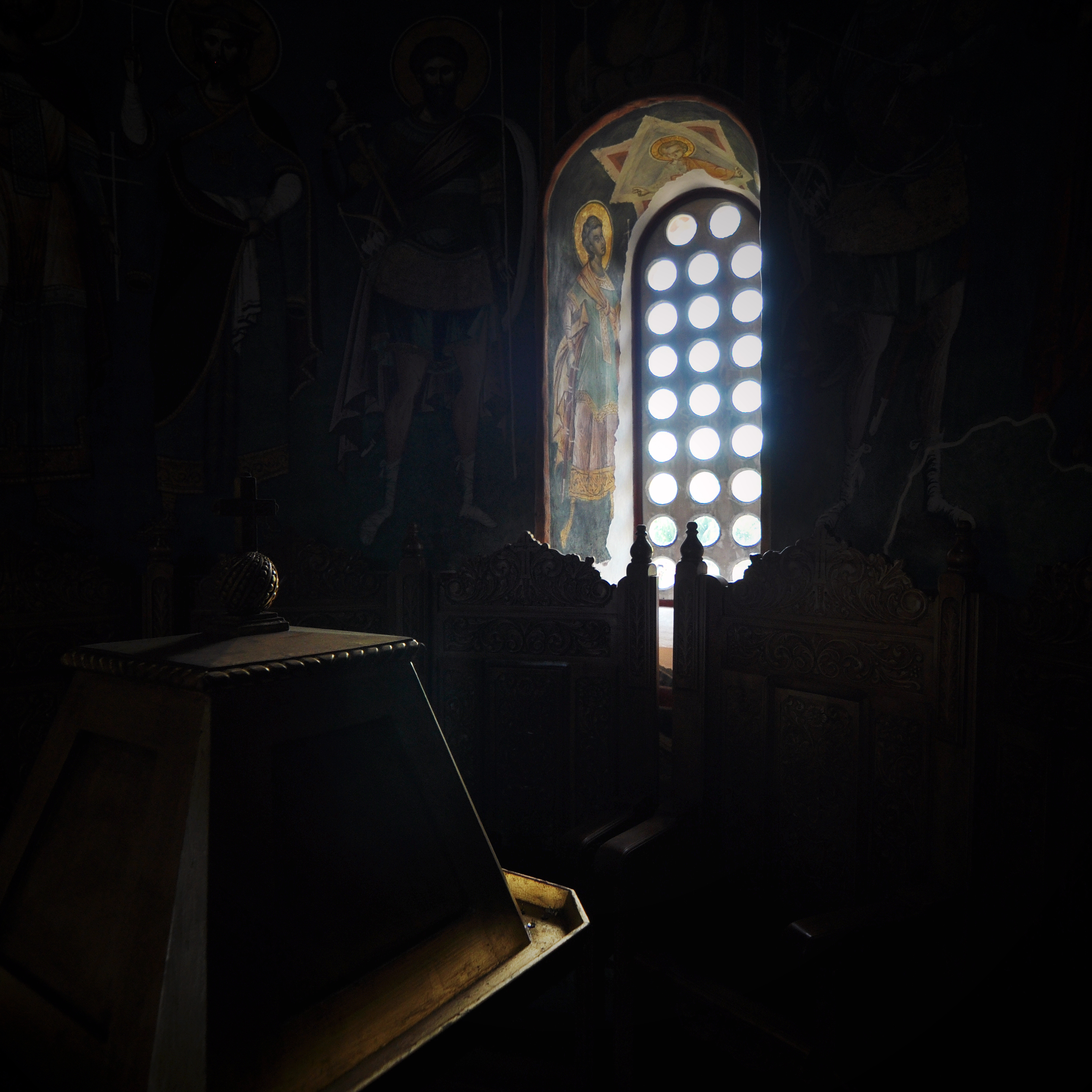

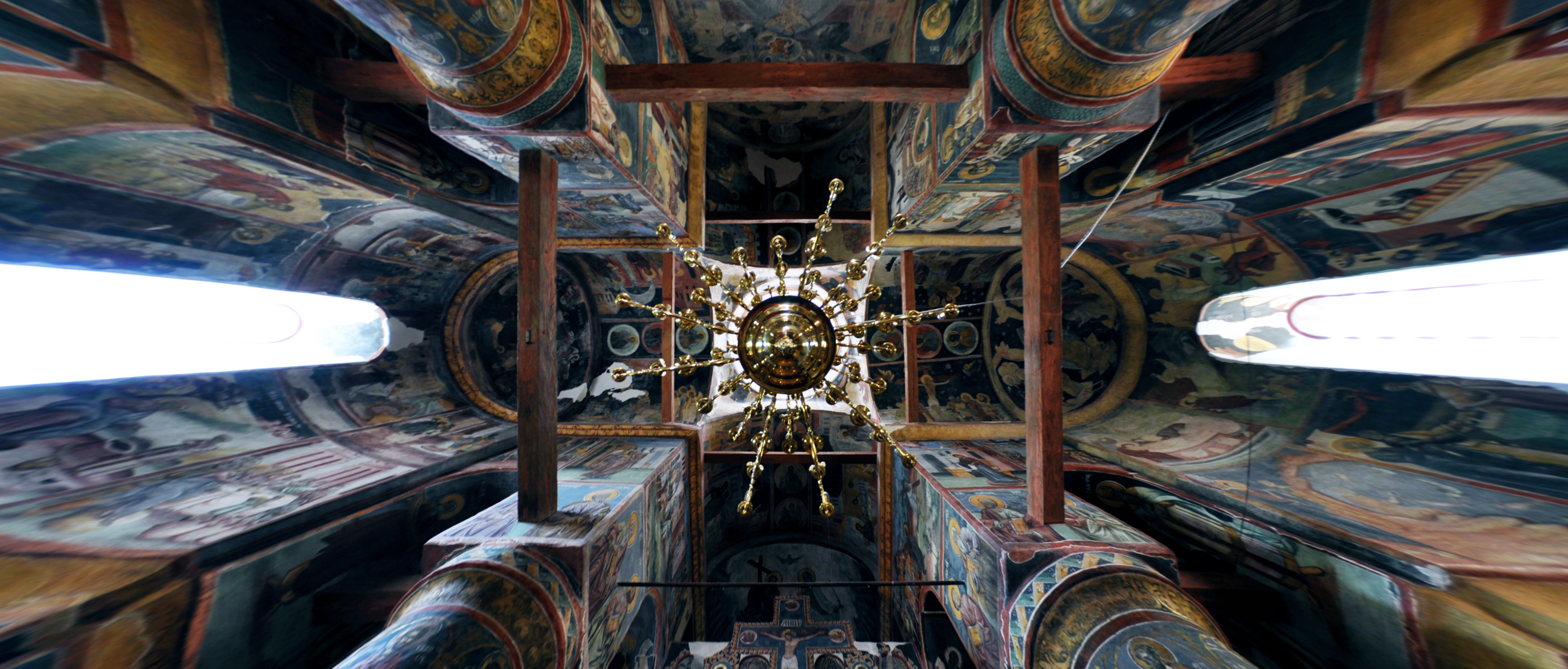

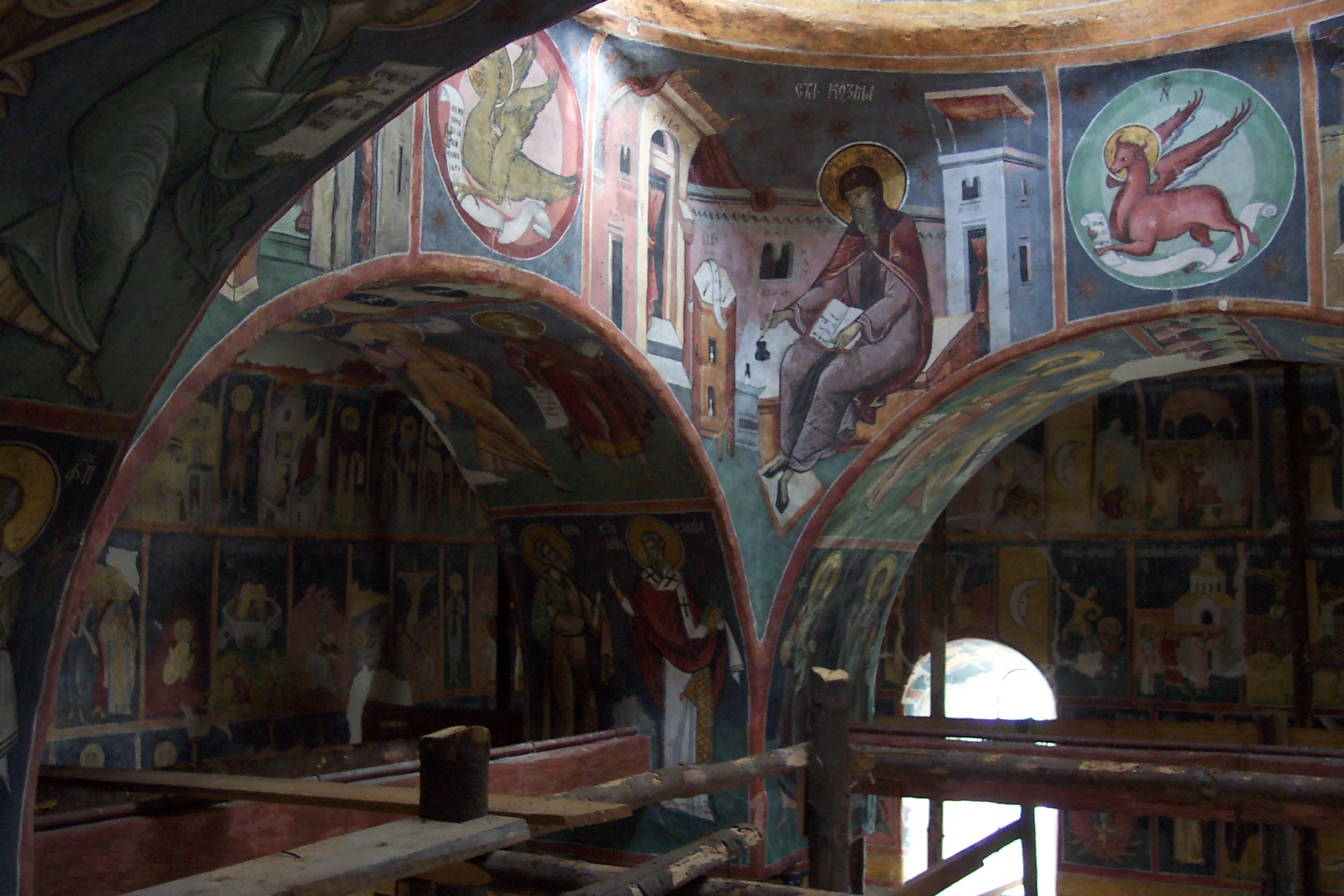

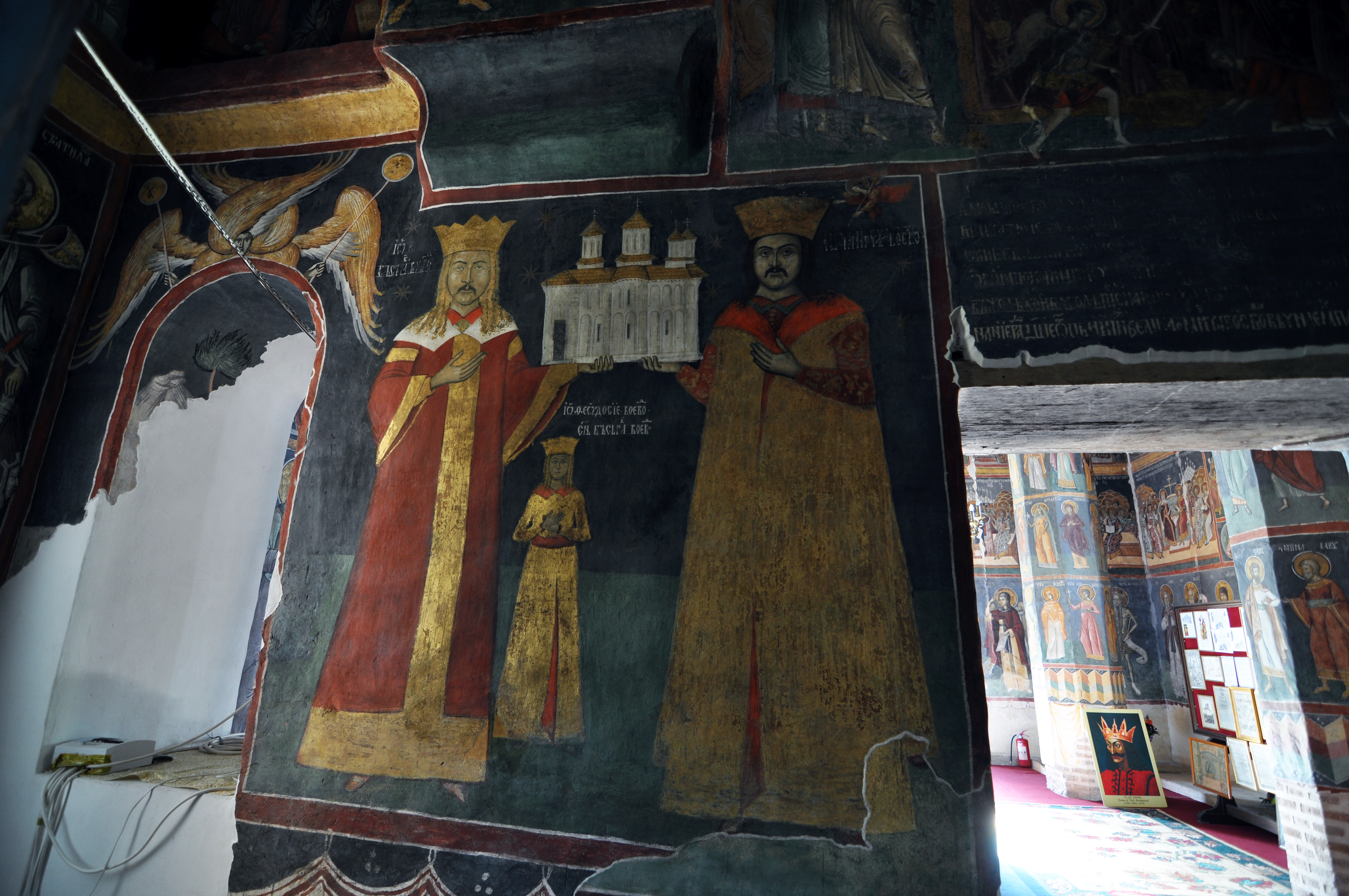

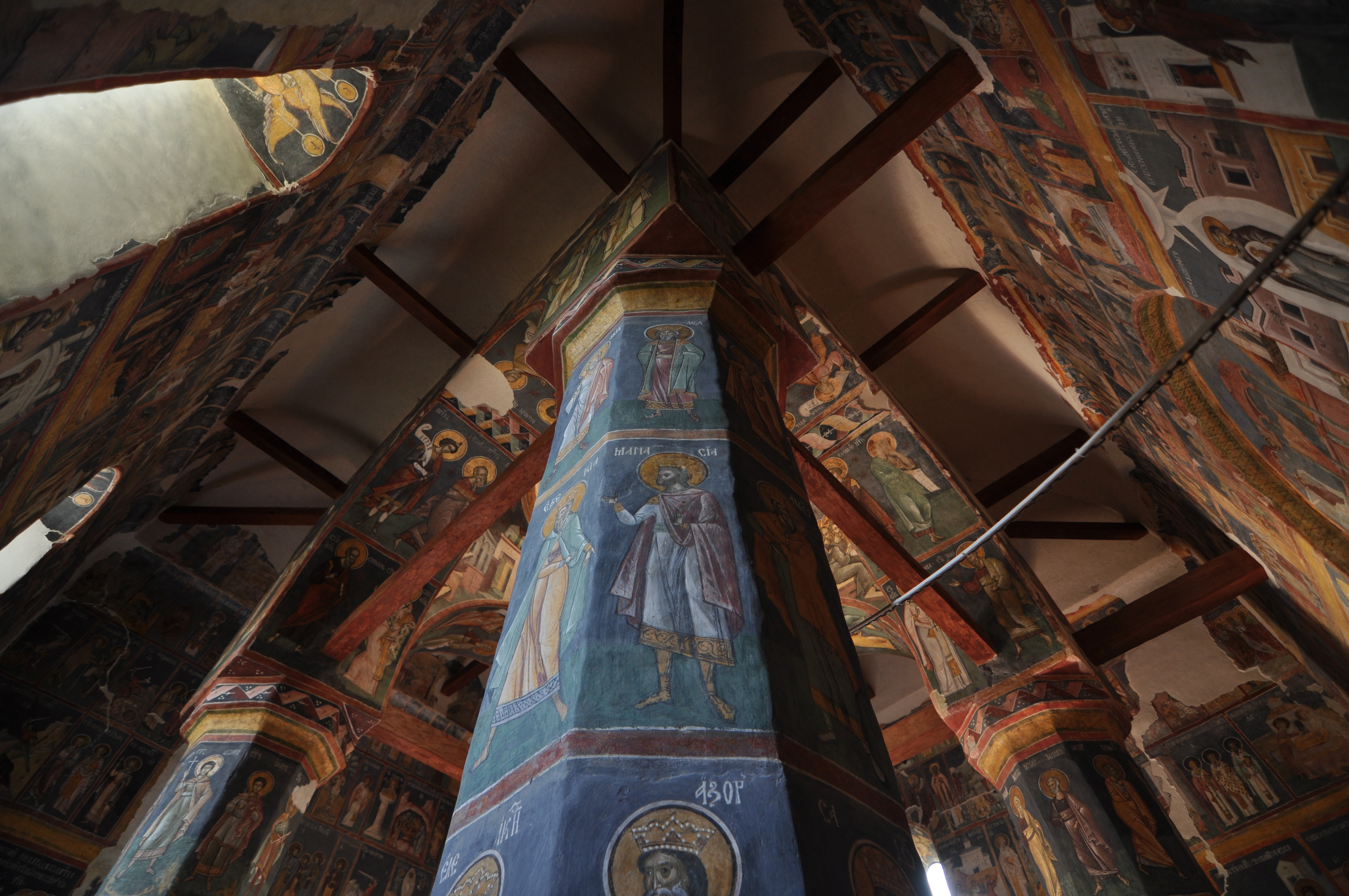

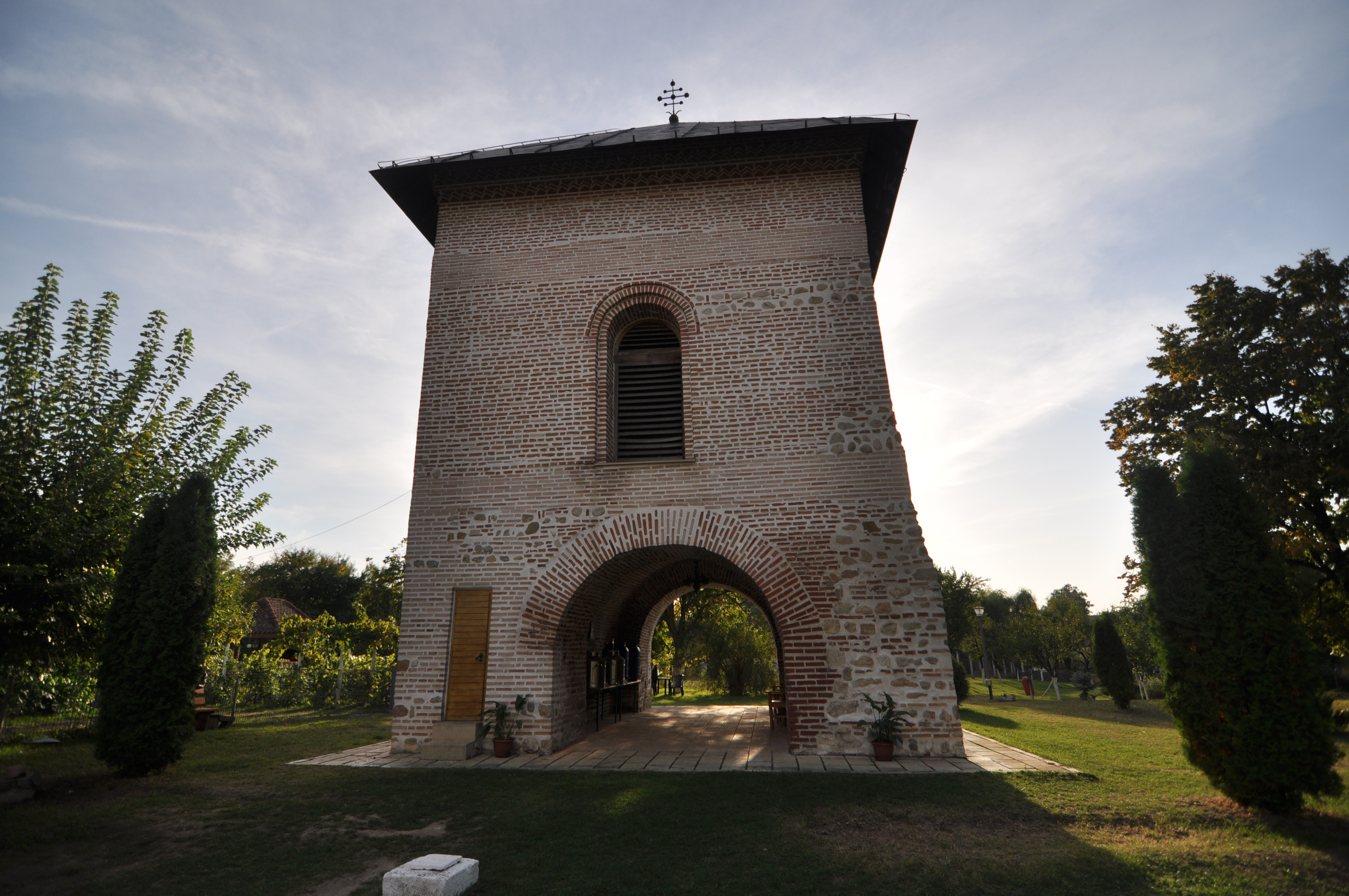

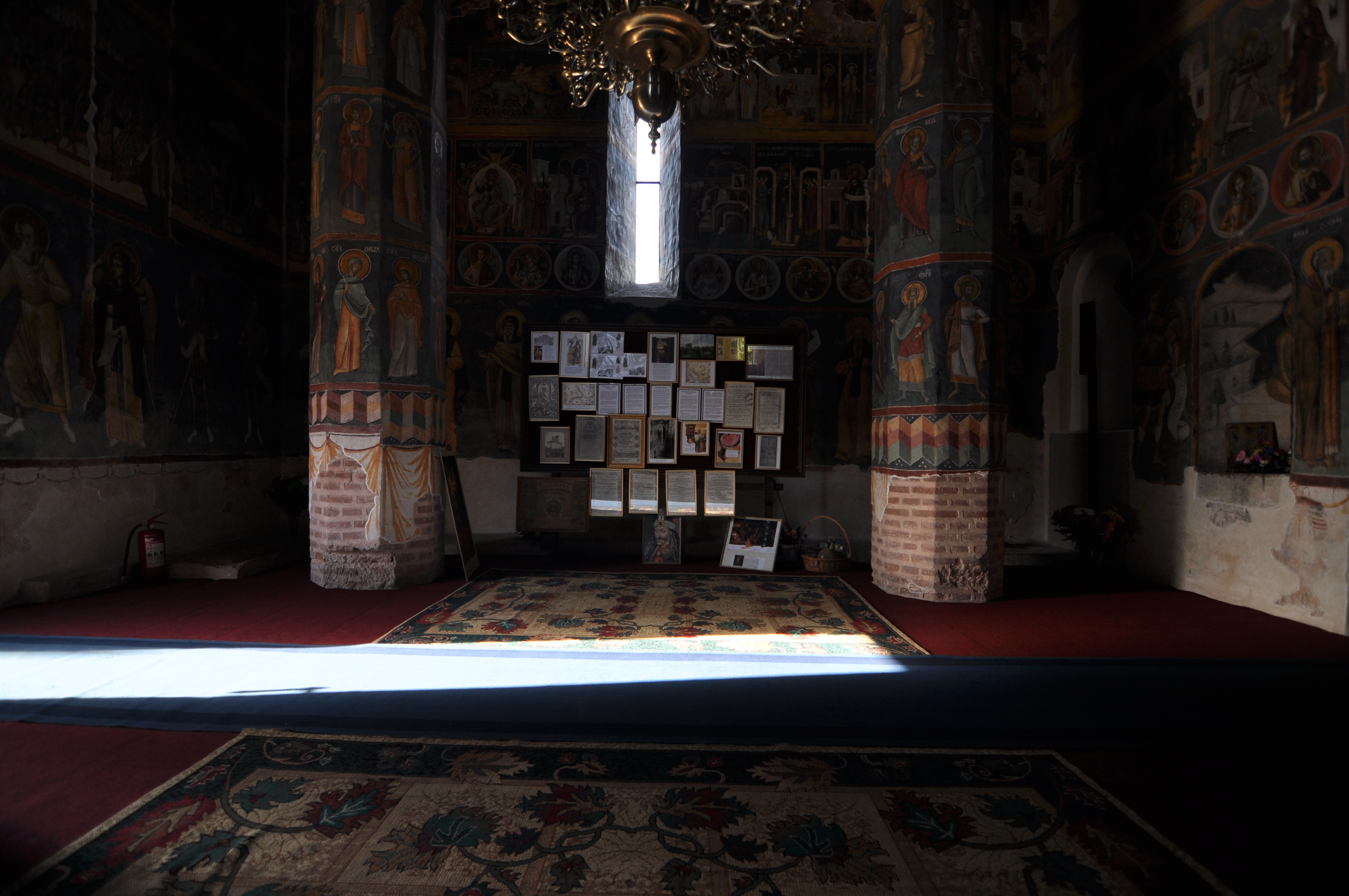
