= Constantin Pană =

Romanian footballer

Personal information
- Date of birth: 17 February 1960 (age 66)
- Place of birth: Lipia Gruiu, Romania
- Positions: Central defender; midfielder

Senior career*
Years	Team	Apps	(Gls)
1977–1980	Rulmentul Alexandria	34	(2)
1980	Argeș Pitești	7	(0)
1981	Dinamo București	12	(0)
1981–1985	Sportul Studențesc	139	(1)
1986	FCM Brașov	13	(1)
1986–1990	Sportul Studențesc	105	(2)
1990–1992	Panachaiki	53	(1)
1992	Sportul Studențesc	1	(0)
1993	Sportul Agrarian Braniștea		
Total		364	(7)

International career
1983	Romania	1	(0)

Managerial career
- 2003: UTA Arad
- * Club domestic league appearances and goals

Constantin Pană (born 17 February 1960 in Lipia Gruiu) is a Romanian former professional footballer who played as a central defender and midfielder for clubs in Romania and Greece.

== International career ==
Pană made one appearance for Romania, when he came as a substitute and replaced Gheorghe Hagi in the 67th minute of a friendly which ended 2–2 against Poland in 1983.
