= Gruiu =

- Commune
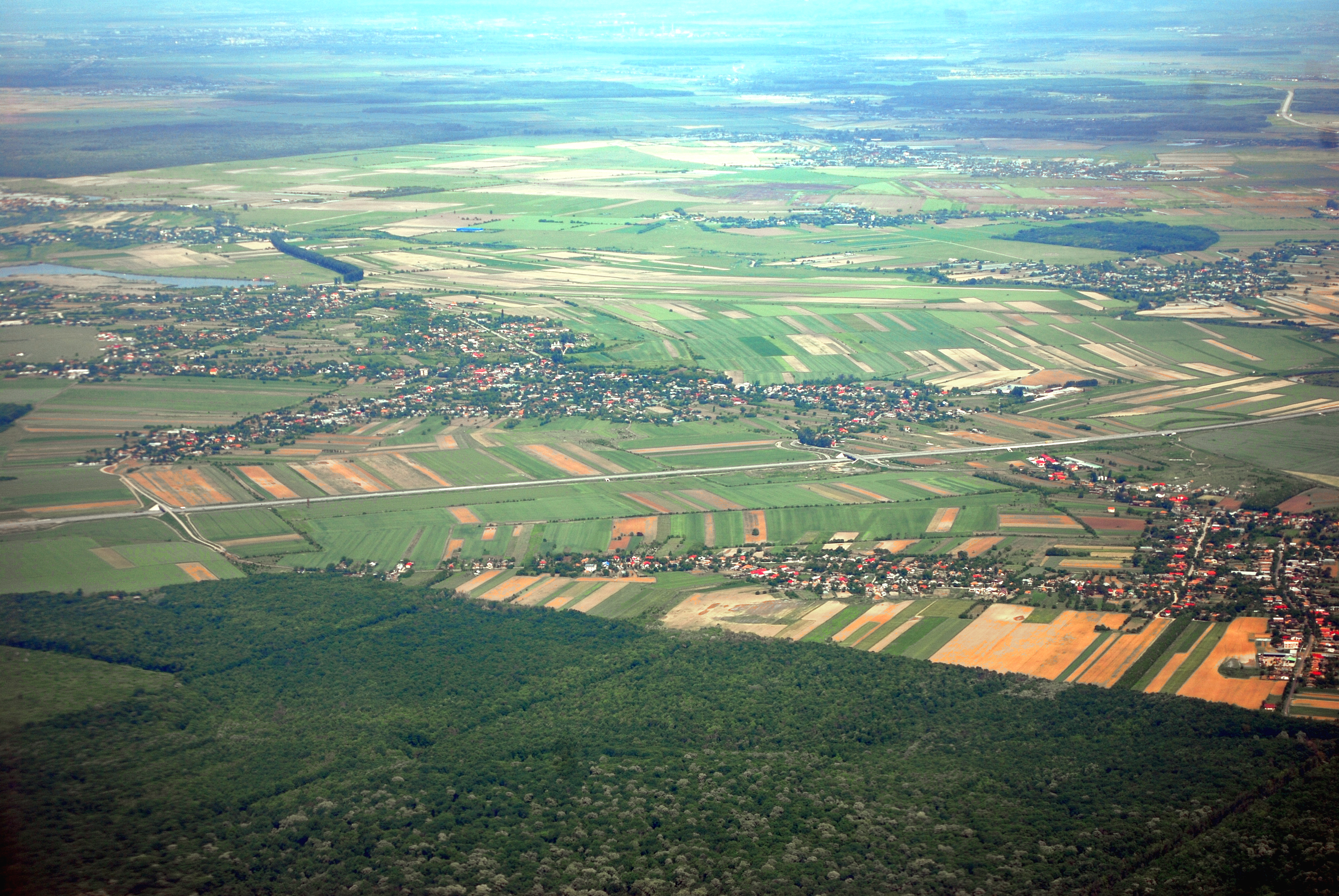
- Aerial view of Gruiu

- Coat of arms

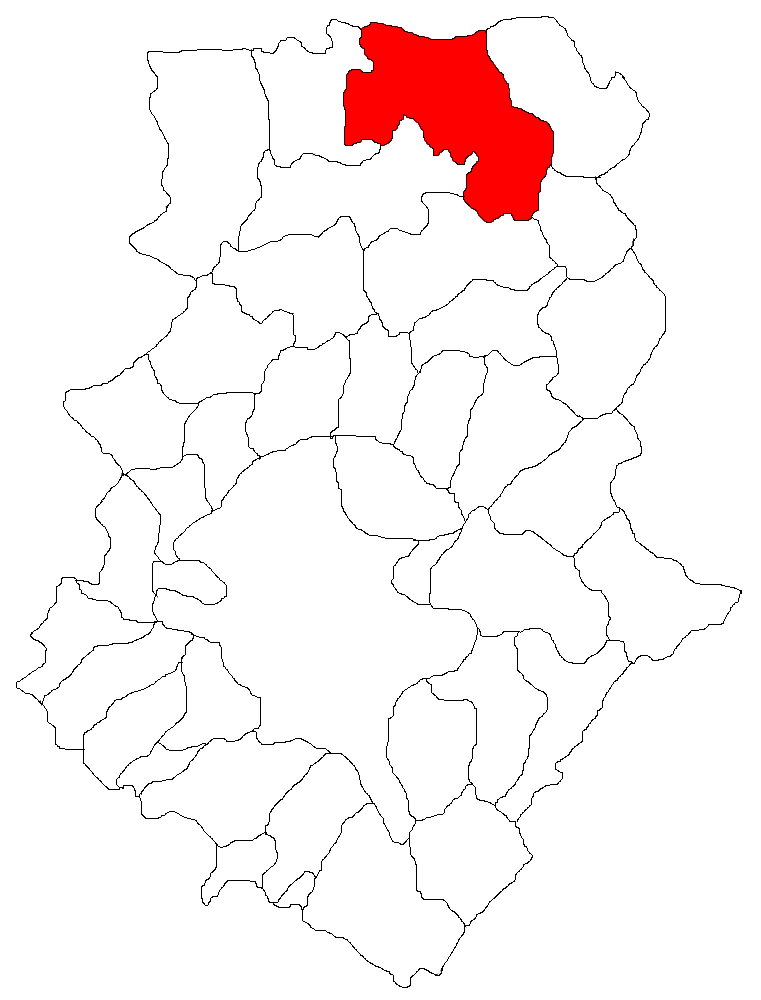
- Location in Ilfov County

- Location in Romania
- Coordinates: 44°44′N 26°13′E
- Country: Romania
- County: Ilfov

Government
  - Mayor (2024–2028): Ion Samoilă (PNL)
- Area: 66 km^{2} (25 sq mi)
- Elevation: 87 m (285 ft)
- Population (2021-12-01): 7,586
  - Density: 110/km^{2} (300/sq mi)
- Time zone: UTC+02:00 (EET)
  - Summer (DST): UTC+03:00 (EEST)
- Postal code: 077115
- Area code: +(40) 21
- Vehicle reg.: IF
- Website: www.primariagruiu.ro

Gruiu is a commune in the northeastern part of Ilfov County, Muntenia, Romania. Its name in the Romanian language means "small hill". It is composed of four villages: Gruiu, Lipia, Siliștea Snagovului, and Șanțu-Florești.

The commune is situated on the border with Prahova County, on the right bank of the river Ialomița and on the north and east banks of Lake Snagov. It is traversed by the A3 motorway, joining the capital city, Bucharest, to Ploiești; there is no exit from the highway in Gruiu.

Căldărușani Monastery is located in Gruiu, by Lake Căldărușani.

Historical population
Year	Pop.	±%
2002	7,155	—
2011	7,412	+3.6%
2021	7,586	+2.3%
Source: Census data

== Natives ==
- Constantin Pană (born 1960), footballer
