= Ciolpani =

- Commune
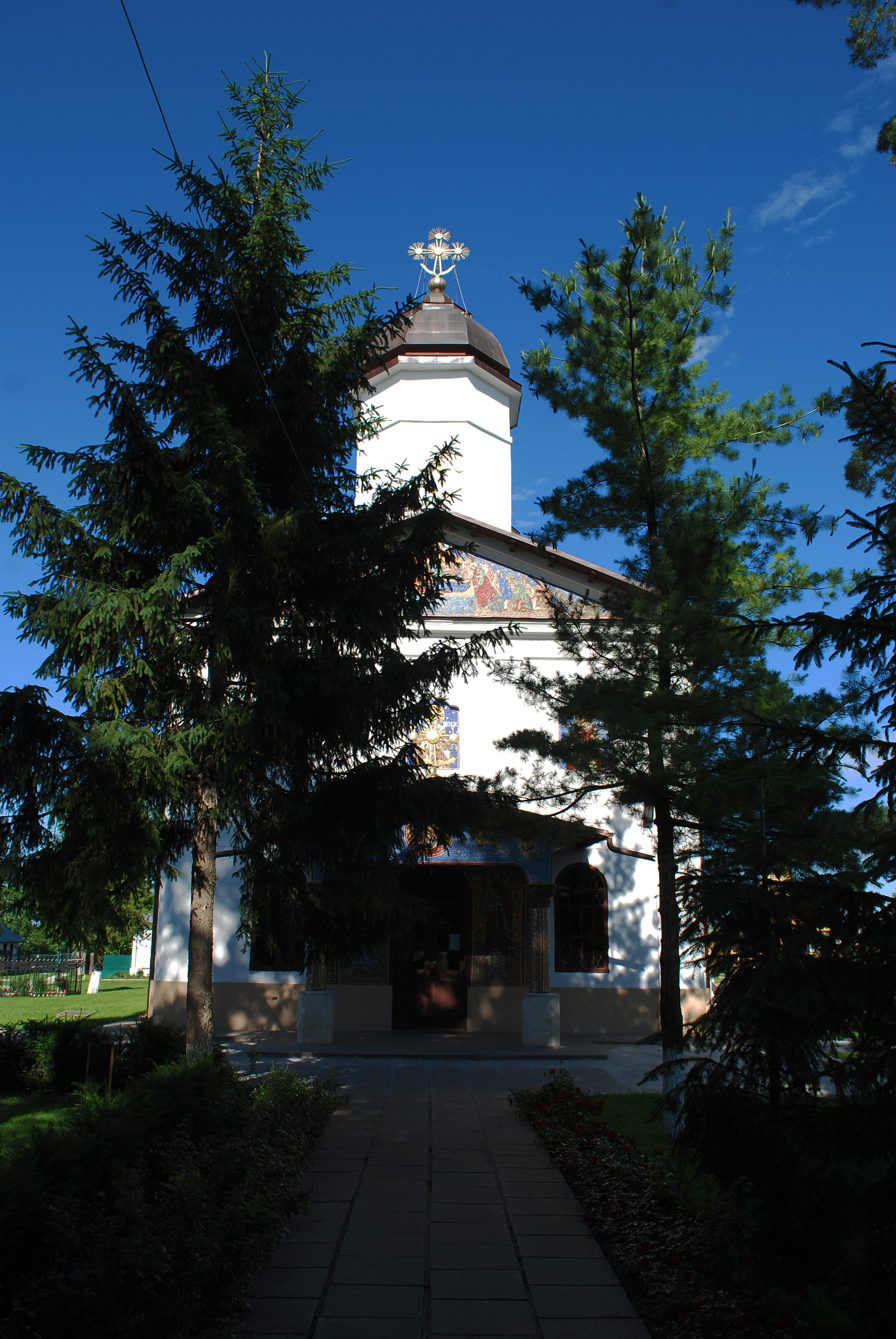
- Țigănești Monastery church

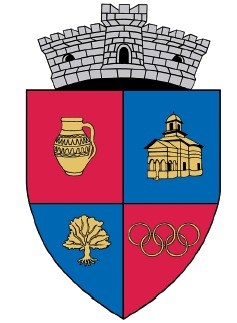
- Coat of arms

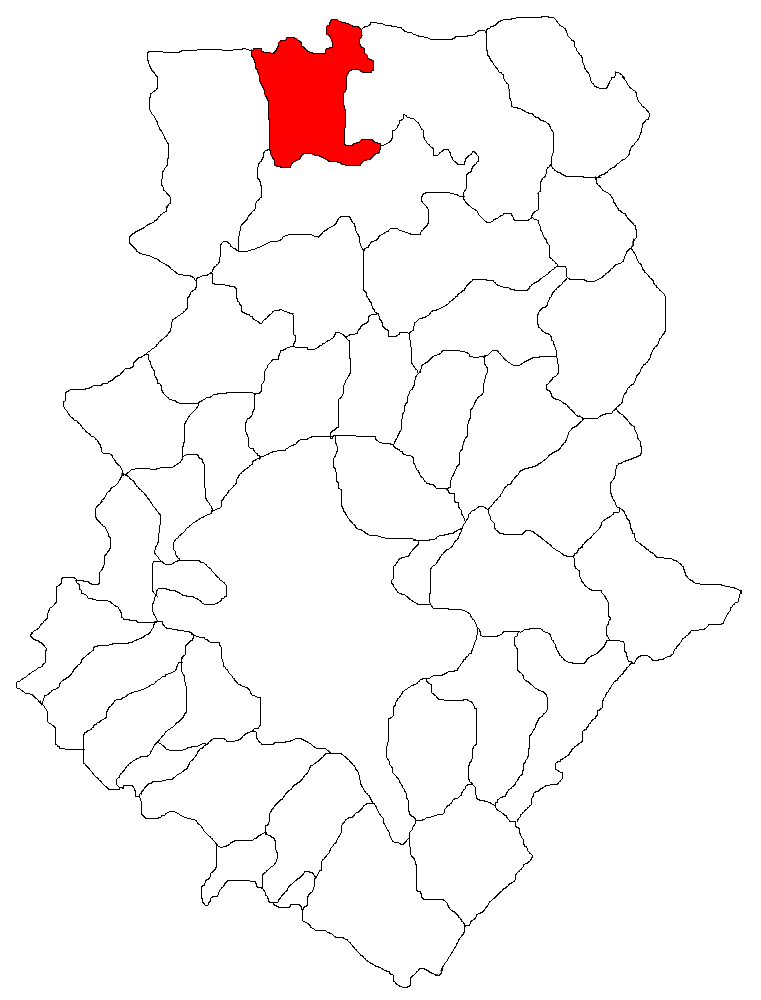
- Location in Ilfov County

- Location in Romania
- Coordinates: 44°43′38″N 26°06′34″E
- Country: Romania
- County: Ilfov

Government
  - Mayor (2020–2024): Bogdan Cristian Călin (PNL)
- Area: 41.55 km^{2} (16.04 sq mi)
- Elevation: 114 m (374 ft)
- Population (2021-12-01): 4,830
  - Density: 116/km^{2} (301/sq mi)
- Time zone: UTC+02:00 (EET)
  - Summer (DST): UTC+03:00 (EEST)
- Postal code: 77050
- Area code: +(40) 21
- Vehicle reg.: IF
- Website: www.primariaciolpani.ro

Ciolpani is a commune in the northwestern part of Ilfov County, Muntenia, Romania. It is composed of five villages: Ciolpani, Izvorani, Lupăria, Piscu, and Țigănești.

The commune is located in the northern part of the county, 36 km (22 mi) from Bucharest, on the border with Prahova County. It is crossed by national road DN1, which connects the capital city with Ploiești, Brașov, and the northwest of the country. Road DN1L branches off from Ciolpani, leading to the shore of Lake Snagov, 5 km (3.1 mi) to the east.

== Etymology ==
Its name is the plural of ciolpan, a Romanian word meaning "tree stump".

Historical population
Year	Pop.	±%
2002	4,472	—
2011	4,811	+7.6%
2021	4,830	+0.4%
Source: Census data
