= Lake Snagov =

Lake in Romania

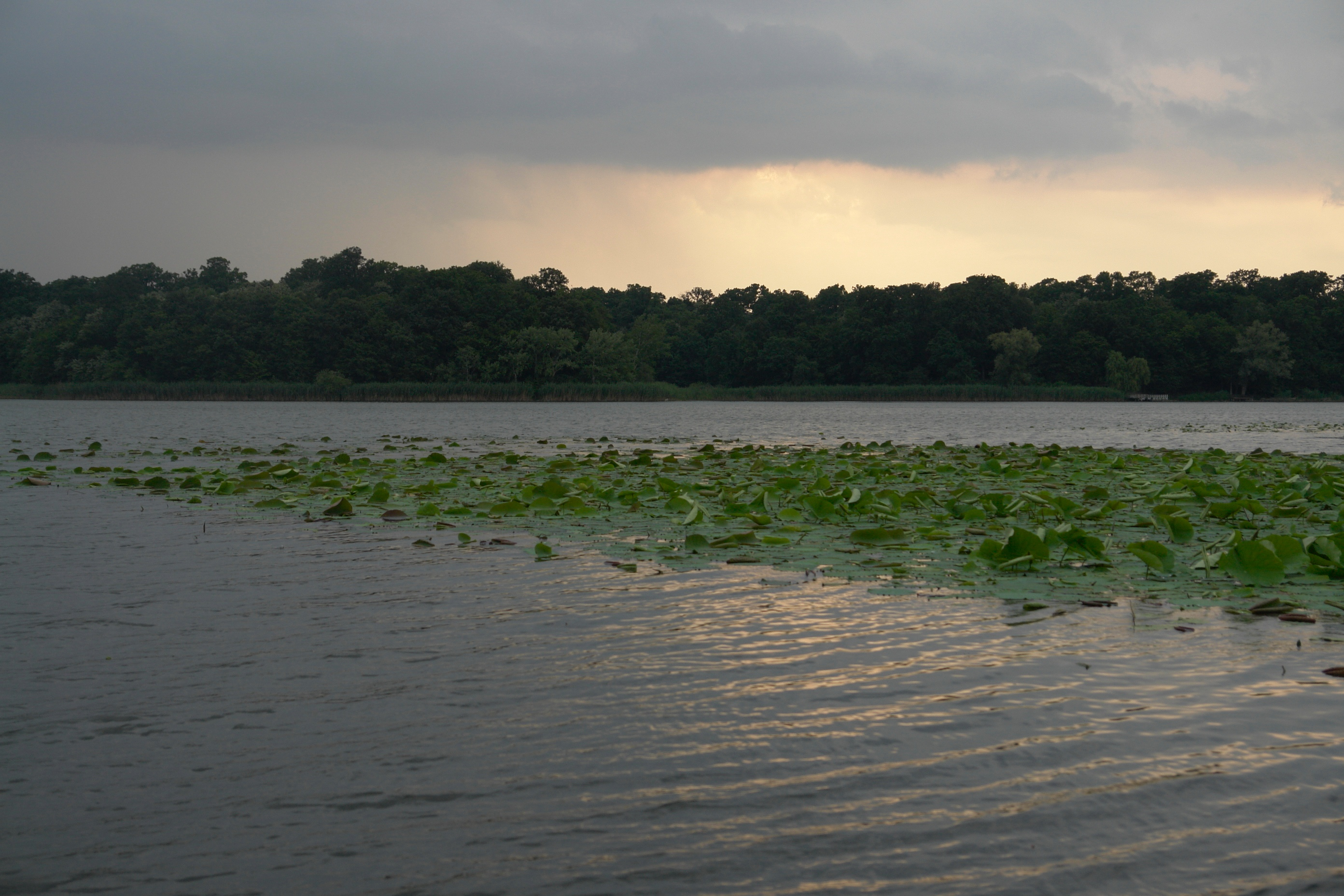
- Snagov Lake at dusk

- Location within Romania
- Location: Snagov, Ilfov County, Romania
- Coordinates: 44°43′48″N 26°10′48″E
- Primary inflows: 4 inner sources
- Primary outflows: Ialomița River
- Basin countries: Romania
- Max. length: 16 km (9.9 mi)
- Max. width: 600 m (2,000 ft)
- Surface area: 5.75 km^{2} (2.22 sq mi)
- Average depth: 5 m (16 ft)
- Max. depth: 11 m (36 ft)
- Shore length^{1}: 32 km (20 mi)
- Surface elevation: 120 m (390 ft)
- Islands: Snagov Monastery
- Settlements: Snagov
- ^{1} Shore length is not a well-defined measure.

Snagov (Romanian: Lacul Snagov) is a lake in Snagov commune, about 25–30 km (16–19 mi) north of Bucharest, Romania. It has a surface of only 5.75 km^{2} (2.22 sq mi), but due to its elongated shape it stretches for about 12 km (7.5 mi), northeast to southwest.

Lake Snagov as well as the nearby Snagov Forest is a protected natural area.

- "Snagov Lake" (Aria Naturală Protejată Lacul Snagov – ANPLS) is about 150 ha (370 acres) in size and protects about 20 species.
- "Snagov Forest" (Aria Naturală Protejată Pădurea Snagov – ANPPS) covers about 10 ha (25 acres).

For both of them, further help and assistance is required to preserve the biodiversity (over 20 protected species).

Snagov Monastery is situated on an islet near the lake's northeastern end, just across Snagov Stadium.

An isolated island monastery in the middle of Lake Snagov houses the Vlad the Impaler's purported final resting place.

The Snagov Declaration was signed on 21 June 1995 in a villa on the lake's shore.
