= 2015–16 FC Petrolul Ploiești season =

Petrolul Ploiești
2015–16 season
- President: Daniel Capră
- Coach: Tibor Selymes (until Aug. 25); Eusebiu Tudor (from Aug. 25)
- Stadium: Stadionul Ilie Oană
- Liga I: 14th
- Cupa României: Round of 16
- Cupa Ligii: Round of 16
- Top goalscorer: League: Abdellah Zoubir; All: Abedellah Zoubir
Home colours	Away colours

The 2015–16 season is Petrolul Ploiești's 86th season in the Romanian football league system, and their fifth consecutive season in the Liga I. Petrolul came sixth in the 2014–15 Liga I. At the beginning of February 2015, due to president Capră still being under detention, the club faced financial problems and entered insolvency, meaning that the participation in UEFA Europa League and UEFA Champions League is denied.

== Month by month review ==
=== June ===
Due to the financial problems, the club had to terminate or not extend the contracts of seventeen players, including Pablo de Lucas, Victoraș Astafei and Jean Sony Alcénat. On 3 June, Tibor Selymes became the head coach of "The Oilmen". On the 11th, the club's reorganisation plan was voted, therefore bankruptcy was avoided for the time being. Nike remained the kit manufacturer, while Superbet, a gambling company, replaced Alexandrion as the main sponsor of the team. "The Yellow Wolves" settled their pre-season training stage at Zlatibor, in the neighbouring country Serbia. The stage started on June 21 and ended on July 4. The club tested and signed new footballers during this period, generally ones who played in the French lower divisions, like Abdellah Zoubir, Ismail Hassan or Nicolas Farina. Ex-Dynamo Moscow midfielder Adrian Ropotan returned to Romania, six years after he left Dinamo București. Petrolul also convinced Brazilian goalkeeper Peterson Peçanha to extend his contract.

=== July ===
On 11 July, Petrolul played its first official game of the season against Steaua București, in the Liga I. The match ended goalless.

Position at the end of July
Pos	Team	Pld	W	D	L	GF	GA	GD	Pts	Qualification
14	Petrolul Ploiești	4	0	3	1	3	4	−1	−3 (Note: Petrolul Ploiești has been penalized with a deduction of six points for failure to comply with licensing requirements.)	Qualification to Relegation round

== Players ==
As of 29 May 2016

=== First team squad ===
Squad No.	Name	Nationality	Position(s)	Date of Birth (Age)	Signed from
Goalkeepers
1	Alberto Cobrea	(Romania)	GK	1 November 1990 (age 34)	Concordia Chiajna
12	Iustin Popescu	(Romania)	GK	1 September 1993 (age 31)	Dinamo București
Defenders
13	Fabrice Begeorgi	(France)	LB	20 April 1987 (age 37)	Free agent
16	Alexandru Benga	(Romania)	CB	15 June 1989 (age 35)	(Azerbaijan) Gabala
22	Dean Beța	(Romania)	LB / RB	11 May 1991 (age 33)	Sportul Studențesc
25	Constantin Mișelăricu	(Romania)	CB	25 September 1989 (age 35)	Viitorul Constanța
37	Alexandru David	(Romania)	RB	15 June 1991 (age 33)	Brașov
40	Roberto Alecsandru	(Romania)	CB	13 September 1996 (age 28)	Petrolul Academy
87	Constantin Costache	(Romania)	CB	5 June 1997 (age 27)	Petrolul Academy
Midfielders
5	Dan Bucșa	(Romania)	DM	23 June 1988 (age 36)	ASA Târgu Mureș
8	Karim Ziani	(Algeria)	AM	17 August 1982 (age 42)	Free agent
17	Abdellah Zoubir	(France)	AM / LW / RW	5 December 1991 (age 33)	(France) Istres
21	Ludovic Guerriero	(France)	DM	5 January 1985 (age 40)	Free agent
23	Daniel Stana	(Romania)	LW	2 December 1982 (age 42)	Ceahlăul Piatra Neamț
77	Bogdan Gavrilă	(Romania)	RW	6 February 1992 (age 33)	Dinamo București
Forwards
9	Michele Paolucci	(Italy)	CF	6 February 1986 (age 39)	Free agent
11	Marcos Michael	(Cyprus)	CF	13 June 1991 (age 33)	(Cyprus) Nea Salamina
14	Cosmin Daniel Lambru	(Romania)	CF	26 November 1998 (age 26)	Petrolul Academy
15	Janko Pacar	(Switzerland)	CF	18 August 1990 (age 34)	(Switzerland) Servette FC
42	Victoraș Astafei	(Romania)	LW	6 July 1987 (age 37)	(Turkey) Adana Demirspor
90	George Mareș	(Romania)	CF	16 May 1996 (age 28)	Sportul Studențesc

=== Out on loan ===
Note: Flags indicate national team as defined under FIFA eligibility rules; some limited exceptions apply. Players may hold more than one non-FIFA nationality.

No.	Pos.	Nation	Player

=== Transfers ===
==== In ====
No.	Pos.	Nat.	Name	Age	EU	Moving from	Type	Transfer window	Ends	Transfer fee	Source
14	MF	(France) (Chad)	Sanaa Altama	24	EU	Oțelul Galați	Transfer	Summer	2018	Free	FC Petrolul Ploiești
37	DF	(France)	Jérémy Faug-Porret	28	EU	Botoșani	Transfer	Summer	2018	Free	FC Petrolul Ploiești
87	MF	(Djibouti) (France)	Ismail Ahmed Kadar Hassan	28	EU	Épinal (France)	Transfer	Summer	2018	Free	FC Petrolul Ploiești
90	FW	(Romania)	Vlad Rusu	24	EU	Academica Argeș	Transfer	Summer	2017	Free	Sport Online Ph
16	DF	(Romania)	Alexandru Benga	26	EU	Gabala (Azerbaijan)	Transfer	Summer	2018	Free	FC Petrolul Ploiești
17	MF	(France) (Morocco)	Abdellah Zoubir	23	EU	Istres (France)	Transfer	Summer	2018	Free	FC Petrolul Ploiești
8	MF	(Romania)	Adrian Ropotan	29	EU	Gabala (Azerbaijan)	Transfer	Summer	2016	Free	FC Petrolul Ploiești
15	FW	(Moldova)	Nicolae Milinceanu	22	EU	Rapid București	Transfer	Summer	2017	Free	FC Petrolul Ploiești
3	DF	(France)	Guillaume Rippert	30	EU	Lausanne-Sport (Switzerland)	Transfer	Summer	2017	Free	FC Petrolul Ploiești
9	FW	(Tunisia) (France)	Sofien Moussa	27	Non-EU	Étoile du Sahel (Tunisia)	Transfer	Summer	2017	Free	FC Petrolul Ploiești
23	MF	(France)	Nicolas Farina	28	EU	Racing FC (Luxembourg)	Transfer	Summer	2016	Free	FC Petrolul Ploiești
11	FW	(Romania)	Petrișor Voinea	25	EU	Sun Pegasus (Hong Kong)	Transfer	Summer	2018	Free	FC Petrolul Ploiești
30	MF	(Romania)	Dacian Varga	30	EU	ASA Târgu Mureș	Transfer	Summer	2016	Free	FC Petrolul Ploiești
5	MF	(Romania)	Dan Bucșa	27	EU	ASA Târgu Mureș	Transfer	Summer	2016	Free	FC Petrolul Ploiești
6	DF	(Romania)	Alexandru Tudose	28	EU	Hoverla Uzhhorod (Ukraine)	Transfer	Summer	2016	Free	FC Petrolul Ploiești
76	FW	(Romania)	Valentin Lemnaru	31	EU	Universitatea Cluj	Transfer	Summer	2016	Free	FC Petrolul Ploiești
3	DF	(Bulgaria)	Viktor Genev	26	EU	St Mirren (Scotland)	Transfer	Summer	2016	Free	FC Petrolul Ploiești
11	MF	(Spain)	Fernando Velasco Salazar	30	EU	CD Leganés (Spain)	Transfer	Summer	2016	Free	FC Petrolul Ploiești
14	DF	(Romania)	Cristian Pulhac	31	EU	Zawisza Bydgoszcz (Poland)	Transfer	Winter	2016	Free	
90	FW	(Romania)	George Mareș	19	EU	FC Brașov	Loan return	Winter	2018	Free	
25	DF	(Romania)	Constantin Mișelăricu	26	EU	Viitorul Constanța	Transfer	Winter		Free	
9	MF	(Italy)	Michele Paolucci	29	EU	Latina Calcio (Italy)	Transfer	Winter	2016	Free	Mediafax
3	DF	(France)	Romain Inez	27	EU	Botev Plovdiv (Bulgaria)	Transfer	Winter		Free	Digisport
13	DF	(France)	Fabrice Begeorgi	29	EU	AC Ajaccio (France)	Transfer	Winter		Free	DigiSport
15	FW	(Croatia) (Switzerland)	Janko Pacar	25	Non-EU	Servette FC (Switzerland)	Transfer	Winter	2018	Free	Sport.ro
21	MF	(France)	Ludovic Guerriero	31	EU	Laval (France)	Transfer	Winter		Free	FC Petrolul Ploiești
6	DF	(Italy)	Giuseppe Prestia	22	EU	Parma (Italy)	Transfer	Winter		Free	Gazeta Sporturilor
37	DF	(Romania)	Alexandru David	24	EU	FC Brașov	Transfer	Winter		Free	stiridesport.ro
12	GK	(Romania)	Iustin Popescu	22	EU	Dinamo București	Loan	Winter		Free	FC Petrolul Ploiești
23	MF	(Romania)	Daniel Stana	33	EU	Ceahlăul Piatra Neamț	Transfer	Winter		Free	FC Petrolul Ploiești
77	MF	(Romania)	Bogdan Gavrilă	24	EU	Dinamo București	Loan	Winter	2016	Free	FC Petrolul Ploiești
11	FW	(Cyprus)	Marcos Michael	24	EU	Nea Salamina (Cyprus)	Transfer	Winter		Free	FC Petrolul Ploiești
8	MF	(Algeria) (France)	Karim Ziani	33	EU	Al-Fujairah SC (United Arab Emirates)	Transfer	Winter	2016	Free	FC Petrolul Ploiești
42	FW	(Romania)	Victoraș Astafei	28	EU	Adana Demirspor (Turkey)	Transfer	Winter	2016	Free	ziare.com

==== Out ====
N	Pos.	Nat.	Name	Age	EU	Moving to	Type	Transfer window	Transfer fee	Source
80	MF	(Portugal)	Filipe Teixeira	34	EU	Astra Giurgiu	Mutual termination	Summer	Free	Sport.ro
3	DF	(Portugal) (Brazil)	Geraldo Alves	34	EU	Astra Giurgiu	Mutual termination	Summer	Free	Sport.ro
4	MF	(Romania)	Ioan Filip	26	EU	Viitorul Constanța	Mutual termination	Summer	Free	FC Petrolul Ploiești
21	MF	(Romania)	Victoraș Astafei	27	EU	Adana Demirspor (Turkey)	Mutual termination	Summer	Free	FC Petrolul Ploiești
91	AM	(Spain)	Pablo de Lucas	28	EU	Beitar Jerusalem (Israel)	Mutual termination	Summer	Free	FC Petrolul Ploiești
13	MF	(Uruguay) (Spain)	Sebastián Gallegos	23	EU	Free agent	Mutual termination	Summer	Free	FC Petrolul Ploiești
2	DF	(Haiti)	Jean Sony Alcénat	29	Non-EU	Steaua București	End of contract	Summer	Free	FC Steaua București
20	MF	(Romania)	Alexandru Coman	23	EU	Ethnikos Achna (Cyprus)	Mutual termination	Summer	Free	Dolce Sport
23	FW	(Uruguay) (Italy)	Rodrigo Pastorini	25	EU	Murciélagos (Mexico)	Mutual termination	Summer	Free	ProSport
11	MF	(Slovenia)	Rok Kronaveter	28	EU	Olimpija Ljubljana (Slovenia)	End of contract	Summer	Free	Stiridesport.ro
10	FW	(Burundi) (Belgium)	Mohamed Tchité	31	EU	Free agent	End of contract	Summer	Free	
5	MF	(Romania)	Ciprian Vasilache	31	EU	Zaria Bălți (Moldova)	End of contract	Summer	Free	
9	FW	(Netherlands) (Democratic Republic of the Congo)	Patrick N'Koyi	25	EU	Rapid București	Mutual termination	Summer	Free	
35	DF	(Romania)	Marian Marin	27	EU	Concordia Chiajna	Mutual termination	Summer	Free	
18	FW	(Romania)	George Mareș	19	EU	FC Brașov	Loan transfer	Summer	Undisclosed	
86	DF	(Croatia) (Slovenia)	Kristijan Ipša	29	EU	Free agent	End of contract	Summer	Free	
8	DF	(Algeria) (France)	Mourad Satli	25	EU	Free agent	Mutual termination	Summer	Free	
39	DF	(France)	Jean-Alain Fanchone	26	EU	Brest (France)	Undisclosed	Summer	Undisclosed	
14	MF	(France) (Chad)	Sanaa Altama	24	EU	Free agent	Mutual termination	Summer	Free	FC Petrolul Ploiești
87	MF	(Djibouti) (France)	Ismail Ahmed Kadar Hassan	28	EU	Free agent	Mutual termination	Summer	Free	FC Petrolul Ploiești
3	DF	(France)	Guillaume Rippert	30	EU	Free agent	Mutual termination	Summer	Free	FC Petrolul Ploiești
11	FW	(Romania)	Petrișor Voinea	25	EU	Free agent	Mutual termination	Summer	Free	FC Petrolul Ploiești
90	FW	(Romania)	Vlad Rusu	26	EU	Viitorul Constanța	Mutual termination	Winter	Free	
6	DF	(Romania)	Alexandru Tudose	29	EU	Free agent	Mutual termination	Winter	Free	Mediafax
23	MF	(France)	Nicolas Farina	29	EU	Cholet (France)	Transfer	Winter	Free	
1	GK	(Brazil)	Peterson Peçanha	36	Non-EU	Viitorul Constanța	Transfer	Winter	€8k	Sport Total FM
93	MF	(Romania)	Alexandru Chiriță	19	EU	Free agent	Mutual termination	Winter	Free	
8	MF	(Romania)	Adrian Ropotan	29	EU	Pandurii Târgu Jiu	Transfer	Winter	Free	Sport.ro
76	FW	(Romania)	Valentin Lemnaru	31	EU	East Riffa (Bahrain)	Transfer	Winter	Free	Mediafax
11	MF	(Spain)	Fernando Velasco Salazar	31	EU	Fuenlabrada (Spain)	Transfer	Winter	Free	Mediafax
7	FW	(Curaçao) (Netherlands)	Gevaro Nepomuceno	23	EU	Marítimo (Portugal)	Mutual termination	Winter	Free	Sport.ro
9	FW	(France) (Tunisia)	Sofien Moussa	28	Non-EU	Tromsø (Norway)	Transfer	Winter	Free	
99	FW	(Israel) (Nigeria)	Toto Tamuz	28	Non-EU	Free agent	Mutual termination	Winter	Free	Libertatea
3	DF	(Bulgaria)	Viktor Genev	27	EU	Dinamo Minsk (Belarus)	Transfer	Winter	Free	
37	DF	(France)	Jérémy Faug-Porret	29	Non-EU	Servette (Switzerland)	Transfer	Winter	Free	
20	GK	(Romania)	Mirel Bolboașă	26	EU	Universitatea Cluj	Loan transfer	Winter	Free	
15	FW	(Moldova)	Nicolae Milinceanu	23	EU	Speranța Nisporeni (Moldova)	Transfer	Winter	Free	Mediafax
3	DF	(France)	Romain Inez	27	EU	Free agent	Mutual termination	Winter	Free	Libertatea
10	MF	(Romania)	Laurențiu Marinescu	31	EU	Free agent	Mutual termination	Winter	Free	Libertatea
30	MF	(Romania)	Dacian Varga	31	EU	Free agent	Mutual termination	Winter	Free	Dragos-trestioreanu.ro
14	DF	(Romania)	Cristian Pulhac	31	EU	Free agent	Mutual termination	Winter	Free	Dragos-trestioreanu.ro
6	DF	(Italy)	Giuseppe Prestia	22	EU	Free agent	Mutual termination	Winter	Free	Dragos-trestioreanu.ro

== Competitions ==
=== Liga I ===
==== Regular season ====
Overall								Home						Away					
Pld	W	D	L	GF	GA	GD	Pts	W	D	L	GF	GA	GD	W	D	L	GF	GA	GD
26	2	8	16	17	34	−17	14	2	5	6	10	15	−5	0	3	10	7	19	−12

Last updated: 26 February 2016 (UTC).
Source: FC Petrolul Ploiești

===== Table =====
Pos	Team	Pld	W	D	L	GF	GA	GD	Pts	Qualification
10	Botoșani	26	6	8	12	30	35	−5	26	Qualification for the relegation round
11	ACS Poli Timișoara	26	5	10	11	24	35	−11	25	Qualification for the relegation round
12	Voluntari	26	5	9	12	28	42	−14	24	Qualification for the relegation round
13	Concordia Chiajna	26	3	8	15	22	46	−24	17	Qualification for the relegation round
14	Petrolul Ploiești (Note: Petrolul Ploiești were deducted six points for failing to comply with licensing requirements.)	26	2	8	16	17	34	−17	8	Qualification for the relegation round

Source: Liga 1, Soccerway
Rules for classification: 1) Points; 2) Head-to-head points; 3) Head-to-head goal difference; 4) Head-to-head goals scored; 5) Goal difference; 6) Goals scored; 7) Play-off.

===== Position by round =====
Round	1	2	3	4	5	6	7	8	9	10	11	12	13	14	15	16	17	18	19	20	21	22	23	24	25	26
Ground	A	H	A	A	H	A	H	A	H	A	H	A	H	H	A	H	H	A	H	A	H	A	H	A	H	A
Result	D	D	L	D	D	L	W	L	L	D	L	L	D	D	L	L	D	L	W	L	L	L	L	L	L	L
Position	14	14	14	14	14	14	14	14	14	14	14	14	14	14	14	14	14	14	14	14	14	14	14	14	14	14

Updated to match(es) played on 27 February 2016 (UTC). Source: Matches
A = Away; H = Home; W = Win; D = Draw; L = Loss

===== Results by opponent =====
Team	Results		Points
Team	Home	Away	Points
ACS Poli Timișoara	1–1	0–1	1
ASA Târgu Mureș	0–1	1–1	1
Astra Giurgiu	0–1	1–3	0
Botoșani	2–1	1–2	3
CFR Cluj	1–0	0–1	3
Concordia Chiajna	1–1	2–2	2
CSMS Iași	1–2	0–1	0
Universitatea Craiova	0–1	0–2	0
Dinamo București	1–2	0–2	0
Pandurii Târgu Jiu	1–1	2–3	1
Steaua București	0–0	0–0	2
Viitorul Constanța	1–2	0–1	0
Voluntari	1–1	0–1	1

Last updated: 27 February 2016

==== Relegation round ====
Overall								Home						Away					
Pld	W	D	L	GF	GA	GD	Pts	W	D	L	GF	GA	GD	W	D	L	GF	GA	GD
14	4	2	8	9	18	−9	14	3	0	4	7	11	−4	1	2	4	2	7	−5

Last updated: 29 May 2016.
Source: Competitive Matches

===== Table =====
Pos	Team	Pld	W	D	L	GF	GA	GD	Pts	Qualification or relegation
7	CSMS Iași	14	5	5	4	17	15	+2	39	Qualification for the Europa League second qualifying round
8	Universitatea Craiova	14	7	2	5	19	17	+2	39	
9	Botoșani	14	7	4	3	29	19	+10	38	
10	CFR Cluj (Note: CFR Cluj would have qualified for the Europa League third qualifying round by winning the 2015–16 Cupa României, but failed to obtain a UEFA licence after filing for insolvency in 2015.)	14	6	4	4	25	13	+12	36	
11	Concordia Chiajna	14	7	5	2	19	13	+6	35	
12	Voluntari (O)	14	5	2	7	19	20	−1	29	Qualification for the relegation play-offs
13	ACS Poli Timișoara (Note: ACS Poli Timișoara were not relegated because the winners of 2015–16 Liga II, Rapid București, were excluded from Liga I after the club went to dissolution.)	14	1	4	9	14	36	−22	20	
14	Petrolul Ploiești (D, R)	14	4	2	8	9	18	−9	18	Not admitted to Liga II and revival in lower leagues

Source: Soccerway
Rules for classification: 1) Points.
(D) Disqualified; (O) Play-off winners; (R) Relegated

===== Position by round =====
Round	1	2	3	4	5	6	7	8	9	10	11	12	13	14
Ground	A	H	A	A	H	A	H	H	A	H	H	A	H	A
Result	L	L	D	W	L	D	W	L	L	W	W	L	L	L
Position	14	14	14	14	14	14	14	14	14	14	14	14	14	14

Updated to match(es) played on 20 May 2016. Source: Competitive Matches
A = Away; H = Home; W = Win; D = Draw; L = Loss

===== Results by opponent =====
Team	Results		Points
Team	Home	Away	Points
ACS Poli Timișoara	3–2	1–0	6
Botoșani	0–4	0–1	0
CFR Cluj	1–0	0–0	4
Concordia Chiajna	0–1	1–1	1
CSMS Iași	1–2	0–1	0
Universitatea Craiova	1–0	0-2	3
Voluntari	1–2	0–2	0

Last updated: 20 May 2016

=== Cupa României ===
==== Round of 32 ====
23 September 2015	Unirea Tărlungeni	0–6	Petrolul Ploiești	Silviu Ploeșteanu, Brașov
		Report	Benga 30'; Tamuz 38', 90'; Varga 47'; Milinceanu 78'; Lemnaru 85'	Attendance: 400; Referee: Ionut Coza; Man of the Match: Tamuz

==== Round of 16 ====
27 October 2015	ACS Timișoara	2–1	Petrolul Ploiești	Dan Păltinișanu, Timișoara
	Hernández 40' (pen.); Cânu 83'		Salazar 70'	Attendance: 1,000

Last updated: 1 December 2015

=== Cupa Ligii ===
==== Round of 16 ====
9 September 2015	ACS Timișoara	1–0	Petrolul Ploiești	Dan Păltinișanu, Timișoara
	Elek 67'	Report		Attendance: 2,500; Referee: Adrian Cojocaru; Man of the Match: Elek

Last updated: 9 September 2015

== Squad statistics ==
=== Goals ===
Updated as of 20 May 2016

Rank	Player	Position	Liga I	Cupa României	Cupa Ligii	Total
1	(France) Abdellah Zoubir	RW	5	0	0	5
2	(Romania) Victoraș Astafei	LW	4	0	0	4
3	(Tunisia) Sofien Moussa	CF	3	0	0	3
4	(Romania) Adrian Ropotan	CM	2	0	0	2
4	(Romania) L. Marinescu	AM	2	0	0	2
4	(Romania) Dacian Varga	LW	1	1	0	2
4	(Spain) Fernando Velasco	CM	1	1	0	2
4	(Romania) Alexandru Benga	CB	1	1	0	2
4	(Israel) Toto Tamuz	CF	0	2	0	2
5	(Romania) Vlad Rusu	CF	1	0	0	1
5	(Italy) Michele Paolucci	CF	1	0	0	1
5	(France) Fabrice Begeorgi	LB	1	0	0	1
5	(Switzerland) Janko Pacar	CF	1	0	0	1
5	(Romania) Bogdan Gavrilă	RW	1	0	0	1
5	(Moldova) Nicolae Milinceanu	CF	0	1	0	1
5	(Romania) Valentin Lemnaru	CF	0	1	0	1
Total			24	7	0	31

== Pre-season and friendlies ==
23 June 2015 Friendly	Petrolul Ploiești (Romania)	5–0	(Serbia) FK Cajetina	Zlatibor, Serbia
	Zoubir 14', 30'; Chiriță 28', 34'; Hadhria 52'	Report

25 June 2015 Friendly	Petrolul Ploiești (Romania)	0–0	(Serbia) Vojvodina Novi Sad	Zlatibor, Serbia
		Report

28 June 2015 Friendly	Petrolul Ploiești (Romania)	1–1	(Serbia) Spartak Zlatibor	Zlatibor, Serbia
	Nepomuceno 71'	Report	Dimitrijević 81'

30 June 2015 Friendly	Petrolul Ploiești (Romania)	0–2	(Serbia) FK Jagodina	Zlatibor, Serbia
		Report	Šušnjar 30' (pen.); Radović 79'

3 July 2015 Friendly	Petrolul Ploiești (Romania)	0–0	(Serbia) Mladost Lučani	Zlatibor, Serbia
		Report

Last updated: 3 July 2015

== See also ==
- 2015–16 Cupa României
- 2015–16 Cupa Ligii
- 2015–16 Liga I
