= 2014–15 FC Petrolul Ploiești season =

Petrolul Ploiești
2014–15 season
- President: Daniel Capră
- Coach: Răzvan Lucescu (until Sept. 16); Gheorghe Mulțescu (from Sept. 17 to Jan. 8); Mircea Rednic (from Jan. 10 to May 5)
- Stadium: Stadionul Ilie Oană
- Liga I: Ongoing
- Cupa României: Semi-finals
- Cupa Ligii: Round of 16
- UEFA Europa League: Play-off round
- Top goalscorer: League: Toto Tamuz (11); All: Toto Tamuz (14)
- Highest home attendance: 14,000 v Steaua (21 September 2014)
- Lowest home attendance: 2,500 v Astra Giurgiu (30 April 2015)
- Average home league attendance: 6,323
Home colours	Away colours	Third colours

The 2014–15 season is Petrolul Ploiești's 85th season in the Romanian football league system, and their fourth consecutive season in the Liga I. Petrolul came third in the 2013–14 Liga I, earning a place in the UEFA Europa League second qualifying round.

== Month by month review ==
=== June ===
Petrolul signed a one-year kit deal with American sportswear company Nike, after the association with Puma came to an end. Also, Acıbadem Healthcare Group became the team's medical sponsor until the end of the season, with an extension option being available. Gevaro Nepomuceno, Patrick N'Koyi, George Mareș, Jean-Alain Fanchone, Alberto Cobrea, Mirel Bolboașă, Andrei Peteleu and Mourad Satli were transferred to Petrolul. Roberto Alecsandru and Alexandru Radu were also promoted from the academy.

=== July ===
On 7 July, Petrolul announced that they had signed winger Victoraș Astafei on a free transfer. On 20 July, using many players that would normally be substitutes and having a player sent off in the second half, Petrolul was beaten by Universitatea Cluj in the Cupa Ligii (English: League Cup) round of 16, a competition which was reenacted after fourteen years of pause. In Europa League, "The Yellow Wolves" eliminated Flamurtari Vlorë 5–1 on aggregate. On 27 July, Petrolul confirmed on its official website that Opel will continue being the shirt sponsor until the end of the season.

Position at the end of July
Pos	Team	Pld	W	D	L	GF	GA	GD	Pts
6	Petrolul Ploiești	1	1	0	0	1	0	+1	3

=== August ===
Petrolul had bad luck at the Europa League third qualifying round draw, confronting Czech side Viktoria Plzeň, a club which in the previous season took part in the Champions League group stage. After a draw at Ploiești (1–1), "The Yellow Wolves" impressively beat Viktoria scoring four goals and conceding only one. The Romanian side's captain, 35-year-old Adrian Mutu, played a big role in his team's qualification, scoring both home and away. However, losing both of the play-off legs against Dinamo Zagreb of Croatia, Petrolul yet again missed the chance of advancing to the group stage.

Position at the end of August
Pos	Team	Pld	W	D	L	GF	GA	GD	Pts	Qualification
3	Petrolul Ploiești	6	4	1	1	13	4	+9	13	2015–16 UEFA Europa League First qualifying round

=== September ===
On 3 September, Uruguayan footballers Rodrigo Pastorini and Sebastián Gallegos joined Petrolul's squad. One week later, Ovidiu Hoban was transferred to Israeli club Hapoel Be'er Sheva. He was Petrolul's only Romanian player called by the national team for a match against Greece, which was played on 7 September. Ioan Filip signed with Petrolul to replace Hoban. On 16 September, Răzvan Lucescu was sacked. Gheorghe Mulțescu, who coached Petrolul twice in the past, took his place one day later. On the same day, "The Yellow Wolves" transferred Kristijan Ipša, a Croatian central defender. Mulțescu made his début against rivals Steaua București, on the 21st. Israeli international striker Toto Tamuz scored a double, but unfortunately, Petrolul lost the match 2–3. After many rumours, Adrian Mutu eventually broke his contract with "The Oilmen", on the 26th. He was the best paid footballer, and was often criticised for playing bad. Cosmin Contra, Petrolul's coach from October 2012 to March 2014, said that the signings of Adrian Mutu and Ianis Zicu (both joined in January 2014) were a "failure".

Position at the end of September
Pos	Team	Pld	W	D	L	GF	GA	GD	Pts
5	Petrolul Ploiești	9	5	2	2	19	9	+10	17

=== October ===
On 16 October, Shai Haddad signed a one-year contract with Petrolul, on Toto Tamuz's recommendation.

Position at the end of October
Pos	Team	Pld	W	D	L	GF	GA	GD	Pts	Qualification
3	Petrolul Ploiești	12	7	3	2	22	9	+13	24	2015–16 UEFA Europa League First qualifying round

=== November ===
On 25 November, president Daniel Capră, general director Marius Bucuroiu and five other persons faced preventive detention for 24 hours, being suspected of tax evasion and money laundering. The loss would amount to 15.4 million euros. The press suggested that these criminal matters could cause serious financial problems for Petrolul and important players might want to leave the club.

Position at the end of November
Pos	Team	Pld	W	D	L	GF	GA	GD	Pts	Qualification
3	Petrolul Ploiești	15	9	4	2	27	9	+18	31	2015–16 UEFA Europa League First qualifying round

=== December ===
Petrolul had the chance to finish the year on the second place of Liga I, but drawn at home against Concordia Chiajna, subsequently keeping the third place.

Position at the end of December
Pos	Team	Pld	W	D	L	GF	GA	GD	Pts	Qualification
3	Petrolul Ploiești	17	9	6	2	29	11	+18	33	2015–16 UEFA Europa League First qualifying round

=== January ===
On 10 January 2015, ex-Standard Liège coach Mircea Rednic replaced Gheorghe Mulțescu on the bench. During the winter transfer window, five footballers left Petrolul, including important ones like Juan Albín and Soni Mustivar.

=== February ===
At the beginning of February, due to president Capră still being under detention, the club faced financial problems and entered insolvency, meaning that the participation in UEFA Europa League and UEFA Champions League is denied. However, among others, Mircea Rednic convinced 31-year-old striker Mohamed Tchité, who spent most of his professional career in Belgium, with Standard Liége, Anderlecht and Club Brugge, and in Spain with Racing de Santander, to be part of the team until the end of the season at the least.

Position at the end of February
Pos	Team	Pld	W	D	L	GF	GA	GD	Pts	Qualification
2	Petrolul Ploiești	19	11	6	2	30	11	+19	39	Became insolvent, is not eligible to play in European cups

=== March ===
Mohamed Tchité made his début on 5 March in the first leg of the Romanian Cup semi-final against rivals Steaua București, scoring his team's only goal in a 1–1 draw.

Position at the end of March
Pos	Team	Pld	W	D	L	GF	GA	GD	Pts	Qualification
3	Petrolul Ploiești	23	12	7	4	34	16	+18	43	Became insolvent, is not eligible to play in European cups

=== April ===
On 3 April, Petrolul missed the qualification to the Cupa României final for the second year in a row, losing the semi-final second leg against Steaua at Arena Națională. However, only a week later, "The Yellow Wolves" defeated them in the championship, after more than 15 years. Curaçaoan winger Gevaro Nepomuceno netted the only goal of the match.

Position at the end of April
Pos	Team	Pld	W	D	L	GF	GA	GD	Pts	Qualification
3	Petrolul Ploiești	29	13	9	7	38	22	+16	48	Became insolvent, is not eligible to play in European cups

=== May ===
On 5 May, it was announced that manager Mircea Rednic left "The Yellow-Blues". Assistant coach Valentin Sinescu continued as the caretaker of the team. Eventually, Petrolul finished the season on a disappointing place six.

Position at the end of May
Pos	Team	Pld	W	D	L	GF	GA	GD	Pts	Qualification
6	Petrolul Ploiești	34	14	10	10	42	30	+12	52	Became insolvent, is not eligible to play in European cups

== Players ==
=== First team squad ===
At the end of the season.

No.	Name	Nat.	Position(s)	Since	Date of Birth (Age)	Signed from	Games	Goals	Fee	Contract End
Goalkeepers
1	Peterson Peçanha	(Brazil)	GK	2013	11 January 1980 (age 46)	Rapid București	64	0	Free	2015
12	Alberto Cobrea	(Romania)	GK	2014	1 November 1990 (age 35)	Concordia Chiajna	3	0	Free	2018
33	Mirel Bolboașă	(Romania)	GK	2014	11 July 1992 (age 34)	Viitorul Constanța (on loan)	0	0	Undisclosed	2015
95	Iuliu Oprea	(Romania)	GK	2014	2 July 1995 (age 31)	Petrolul Academy	0	0	-/-	Undisclosed
Defenders
2	Jean Sony Alcénat	(Haiti)	RB	2012	23 January 1986 (age 40)	(Portugal) Rio Ave	74	2	Undisclosed	2015
5	Dean Beța	(Romania)	RB / LB	2013	11 May 1991 (age 35)	Sportul Studențesc	9	0	Free	2016
8	Mourad Satli	(Algeria)	CB / LB / RB	2014	29 January 1990 (age 36)	(Belgium) Charleroi	25	0	Free	2017
35	Marian Marin	(Romania)	RB	2015	11 September 1987 (age 38)	Fortuna Poiana Câmpina	3	0	Free	2015
39	Jean-Alain Fanchone	(France)	LB	2014	22 September 1988 (age 37)	(Italy) Udinese Calcio	16	0	Undisclosed	2017
40	Roberto Alecsandru	(Romania)	CB	2014	13 September 1996 (age 29)	Petrolul Academy	1	0	-/-	Undisclosed
77	Andrei Peteleu	(Romania)	RB	2014	20 August 1992 (age 34)	Săgeata Năvodari	16	0	Free	2017
86	Kristijan Ipša	(Croatia)	CB / RB	2014	4 April 1986 (age 40)	(Italy) Reggina Calcio	21	1	Free	2015
Midfielders
4	Ioan Filip	(Romania)	DM	2014	20 May 1989 (age 37)	Oțelul Galați	24	0	Free	2015
5	Ciprian Vasilache	(Romania)	AM / RW / LW	2015	14 September 1983 (age 42)	(South Korea) Gangwon FC	8	1	Free	2015
7	Gevaro Nepomuceno	(Curaçao)	LW / RW	2014	10 November 1992 (age 33)	(Netherlands) Fortuna Sittard	25	1	Free	2017
11	Rok Kronaveter	(Slovenia)	CM / AM	2015	7 December 1986 (age 39)	(Hungary) Győri ETO	11	2	Free	2015
13	Sebastián Gallegos	(Uruguay)	AM / RW / LW	2014	18 January 1992 (age 34)	(Italy) Calcio Como	2	0	Free	2015
20	Alexandru Coman	(Romania)	DM / CM	2015	16 October 1991 (age 34)	Rapid București	7	0	Free	2015
21	Victoraș Astafei	(Romania)	RW / LW / CF	2014	6 July 1987 (age 39)	Oțelul Galați	29	5	Free	2017
30	Laurențiu Marinescu	(Romania)	DM / AM	2012	25 August 1984 (age 42)	Universitatea Cluj	53	3	Undisclosed	2016
91	Pablo de Lucas	(Spain)	DM / CM / AM	2013	20 September 1986 (age 39)	(Spain) Salamanca	52	2	Free	2016
93	Alexandru Chiriță	(Romania)	AM / RW	2014	24 June 1996 (age 30)	Dinamo București II	1	0	Free	Undisclosed
Forwards
9	Patrick N'Koyi	(Netherlands)	CF	2014	1 January 1990 (age 36)	(Netherlands) Fortuna Sittard	17	1	Free	2017
10	Mohamed Tchité	(Burundi)	CF / RW	2015	31 January 1984 (age 42)	(Belgium) Club Brugge	11	0	Free	2015
18	George Mareș	(Romania)	CF	2014	16 May 1996 (age 30)	Sportul Studențesc	6	0	Free	2018
23	Rodrigo Pastorini	(Uruguay)	CF / AM	2014	4 March 1990 (age 36)	(Uruguay) Montevideo Wanderers	16	0	Free	2016
29	Alexandru Radu	(Romania)	CF	2014	9 May 1997 (age 29)	Petrolul Academy	1	0	-/-	Undisclosed
99	Toto Tamuz	(Israel)	CF	2014	1 April 1988 (age 38)	(Russia) Ural Sverdlovsk Oblast	36	14	Free	2016

=== Transfers ===
==== In ====
No.	Pos.	Nat.	Name	Age	EU	Moving from	Type	Transfer window	Ends	Transfer fee	Source
—	FW	(Romania)	Mihai Roman	22	EU	Săgeata Năvodari	Loan return	Summer	2014	Free	
7	FW	(Curaçao) (Netherlands)	Gevaro Nepomuceno	21	EU	Fortuna Sittard (Netherlands)	Transfer	Summer	2017	Free	FC Petrolul Ploiești
9	FW	(Netherlands) (Democratic Republic of the Congo)	Patrick N'Koyi	24	EU	Fortuna Sittard (Netherlands)	Transfer	Summer	2017	Free	FC Petrolul Ploiești
18	FW	(Romania)	George Mareș	18	EU	Sportul Studențesc	Transfer	Summer	2018	Undisclosed	
39	DF	(France)	Jean-Alain Fanchone	25	EU	Udinese (Italy)	Transfer	Summer	2017	Undisclosed	FC Petrolul Ploiești
12	GK	(Romania)	Alberto Cobrea	23	EU	Concordia Chiajna	Transfer	Summer	2018	Undisclosed	ProSport
33	GK	(Romania)	Mirel Bolboașă	25	EU	Viitorul	Loan transfer	Summer	2015	Undisclosed	FC Petrolul Ploiești
77	DF	(Romania)	Andrei Peteleu	21	EU	Săgeata Năvodari	Transfer	Summer	2017	Free	FC Petrolul Ploiești
8	DF	(Algeria) (France)	Mourad Satli	24	EU	Charleroi (Belgium)	Transfer	Summer	2017	Free	FC Petrolul Ploiești
21	MF	(Romania)	Victoraș Astafei	27	EU	Oțelul Galați	Transfer	Summer	2017	Free	FC Petrolul Ploiești
14	DF	(Romania)	Roberto Alecsandru	17	EU	Youth system	Promoted	Summer	Undisclosed	Free	
17	DF	(Romania)	Alexandru Radu	17	EU	Youth system	Promoted	Summer	Undisclosed	Free	
23	FW	(Uruguay) (Italy)	Rodrigo Pastorini	24	EU	Montevideo Wanderers (Uruguay)	Transfer	Summer	2016	Free	FC Petrolul Ploiești
13	AM	(Uruguay) (Spain)	Sebastián Gallegos	22	EU	Calcio Como (Italy)	Transfer	Summer	2015	Free	FC Petrolul Ploiești
4	MF	(Romania)	Ioan Filip	25	EU	Oțelul Galați	Transfer	Summer	2015	Free	FC Petrolul Ploiești
86	DF	(Croatia) (Slovenia)	Kristijan Ipša	28	EU	Reggina Calcio (Italy)	Transfer	Summer	2015	Free	FC Petrolul Ploiești
93	MF	(Romania)	Alexandru Chiriță	18	EU	Dinamo București II	Transfer	Summer	Undisclosed	Undisclosed	
15	DF	(Israel)	Shai Haddad	27	Non-EU	Beitar Jerusalem (Israel)	Transfer	Summer	2015	Free	
5	MF	(Romania)	Ciprian Vasilache	31	EU	Gangwon FC (South Korea)	Transfer	Winter	2015	Free	FC Petrolul Ploiești
20	MF	(Romania)	Alexandru Coman	23	EU	Rapid București	Transfer	Winter	2015	Free	Dolce Sport
10	FW	(Burundi) (Belgium)	Mohammed Tchité	31	EU	Club Brugge (Belgium)	Transfer	Winter	2015	Free	La Derniere Heure
11	MF	(Slovenia)	Rok Kronaveter	28	EU	Győri ETO (Hungary)	Transfer	Winter	2015	Free	
35	DF	(Romania)	Marian Marin	28	EU	Fortuna Poiana Câmpina	Transfer	Winter	2015	Free	

==== Out ====
No.	Pos.	Nat.	Name	Age	EU	Moving to	Type	Transfer window	Transfer fee	Source
—	FW	(Romania)	Mihai Roman	22	EU	Pandurii Târgu Jiu	End of contract	Summer	Free	
32	DF	(Romania)	Sebastian Achim	28	EU	CS U Craiova	End of contract	Summer	Free	
4	DF	(Central African Republic) (France)	Manassé Enza-Yamissi	24	EU	Gil Vicente (Portugal)	End of contract	Summer	Free	
23	GK	(Romania)	Mircea Bornescu	34	EU	Rapid București	End of contract	Summer	Free	
21	DF	(Brazil)	Guilherme Sityá	24	Non-EU	Greuther Fürth (Germany)	End of contract	Summer	Free	FC Petrolul Ploiești
16	FW	(Portugal) (Guinea-Bissau)	Abel Camará	24	EU	Belenenses (Portugal)	End of loan	Summer	Free	
7	MF	(Spain)	Walter Fernández	24	EU	Lokeren (Belgium)	End of loan	Summer	Free	
22	GK	(Lithuania)	Povilas Valinčius	25	EU	Free agent	Mutual termination	Summer	Free	
27	MF	(Romania)	Ianis Zicu	30	EU	ASA Târgu Mureș	Mutual termination	Summer	Free	FC Petrolul Ploiești
93	FW	(Romania)	Vlad Morar	21	EU	Universitatea Cluj	Mutual termination	Summer	Free	FC Petrolul Ploiești
52	MF	(Brazil)	Romário Pires	25	Non-EU	Karpaty Lviv (Ukraine)	Mutual termination	Summer	Free	ProSport
15	MF	(Romania)	Ovidiu Hoban	31	EU	Hapoel Be'er Sheva (Israel)	Transfer	Summer	Undisclosed	FC Petrolul Ploiești
10	FW	(Romania)	Adrian Mutu	35	EU	Free agent	Mutual termination	Summer	Free	FC Petrolul Ploiești
11	MF	(Uruguay) (Spain)	Juan Ángel Albín	28	EU	Veracruz (Mexico)	Transfer	Winter	Undisclosed	Deportes Televisa
15	DF	(Israel)	Shai Haddad	27	Non-EU	Free agent	Mutual termination	Winter	Free	Realitatea.net
20	MF	(Cameroon) (Malta)	Njongo Priso	26	EU	Győri ETO (Hungary)	Mutual termination	Winter	Free	FC Petrolul Ploiești
5	MF	(Haiti) (France)	Soni Mustivar	24	EU	Sporting Kansas City (United States)	Mutual termination	Winter	Free	FC Petrolul Ploiești
35	DF	(Brazil) (Spain)	Gerson Guimarães	23	EU	Lechia Gdańsk (Poland)	Mutual termination	Winter	Free	

== Competitions ==
=== Overall ===
Competition	Started round	Current position / round	Final position / round	First match	Last match
Liga I	—	—	6th	27 July 2014	27 May 2015
Cupa României	Round of 32	—	Semi-finals	24 September 2014	2 April 2015
Cupa Ligii	Round of 16	—	Round of 16	20 July 2014	
UEFA Europa League	Second qualifying round	—	Play-off round	17 July 2014	28 August 2014

Updated to match played 27 May 2015
Source: Competitions

=== Liga I ===
==== League table ====
Pos	Team	Pld	W	D	L	GF	GA	GD	Pts	Qualification or relegation
4	Astra Giurgiu	34	15	12	7	53	27	+26	57 (Note: CFR Cluj ahead on head-to-head record; CFR Cluj–Astra Giurgiu 4–1, Astra Giurgiu–CFR Cluj 0–1)	Qualification for the Europa League second qualifying round (Note: The Romanian Cup finalist Universitatea Cluj filed for insolvency, and the other one is Steaua București, so the European spot meant for cup winner will be filled up by the 3rd eligible team from the Liga I and the spot for the third-placed team will be given to the 4th eligible team from the Liga I.)
5	Universitatea Craiova (Note: Teams who have not been given a UEFA license (Brașov, Ceahlăul Piatra Neamț, CFR Cluj, Concordia Chiajna, Universitatea Craiova, Dinamo București, Oțelul Galați, Petrolul Ploiești, Rapid București and Universitatea Cluj) were not eligible to play in European competitions. Petrolul Ploiești, Dinamo București, Rapid București, FC Brașov, Universitatea Cluj and CFR Cluj were not eligible to play in Europe because they filed for insolvency and Universitatea Craiova was not eligible because it was affiliated in 2013.) (I)	34	14	11	9	40	34	+6	53	Not granted a license for UEFA Competitions
6	Petrolul Ploiești (I)	34	14	10	10	42	30	+12	52	Not granted a license for UEFA Competitions
7	Dinamo București (I)	34	13	9	12	47	44	+3	48	Not granted a license for UEFA Competitions
8	Botoșani	34	12	11	11	40	43	−3	47	Qualification for the Europa League first qualifying round

Source: Liga I (in Romanian) UEFA.com (in English)
Rules for classification: 1) points; 2) head-to-head results; 3) goal difference; 4) number of goals scored
(I) Unable to qualify for UEFA Competitions

==== Results summary ====
Overall								Home						Away					
Pld	W	D	L	GF	GA	GD	Pts	W	D	L	GF	GA	GD	W	D	L	GF	GA	GD
34	14	10	10	42	30	+12	52	6	3	8	19	20	−1	8	7	2	23	10	+13

Last updated: 27 May 2015.
Source: Matches

==== Results by round ====
Round	1	2	3	4	5	6	7	8	9	10	11	12	13	14	15	16	17	18	19	20	21	22	23	24	25	26	27	28	29	30	31	32	33	34
Ground	A	H	A	H	A	H	A	H	A	H	H	A	H	A	H	A	H	H	A	H	A	H	A	H	A	H	A	A	H	A	H	A	H	A
Result	W	W	W	D	W	L	D	L	W	W	W	D	D	W	W	D	D	W	W	L	D	L	W	L	W	L	D	D	L	D	W	L	L	L
Position	6	4	1	2	1	3	4	6	5	3	3	3	3	3	3	3	3	2	2	2	2	3	3	3	3	3	3	3	3	3	3	3	4	6

Updated to match(es) played on 28 May 2015. Source: Matches
A = Away; H = Home; W = Win; D = Draw; L = Loss

==== Matches ====
Win Draw Loss

27 July 2014 1	FC Brașov	0–1	Petrolul Ploiești	Brașov
		Report	Teixeira 38'	Stadium: Silviu Ploeșteanu; Attendance: 2,500; Referee: Adrian Viorel Cojocaru

3 August 2014 2	Petrolul Ploiești	4–1	FC Botoșani	Ploiești
	Mutu 1'; Albín 13'; Tamuz 16', 60'	Report	Batin 38'	Stadium: Ilie Oană; Attendance: 7,500; Referee: Ovidiu Hațegan

10 August 2014 3	CSMS Iași	1–5	Petrolul Ploiești	Iași
	Wesley 24'	Report	Teixeira 19'; Mutu 50'; Tamuz 57', 71'; Albín 90+2'	Stadium: Emil Alexandrescu; Attendance: 6,000; Referee: Cristian Balaj

16 August 2014 4	Petrolul Ploiești	0–0	Rapid București	Ploiești
		Report		Stadium: Ilie Oană; Attendance: 7,000; Referee: Istvan Kovacs

24 August 2014 5	CS U Craiova	0–2	Petrolul Ploiești	Craiova
		Report	Albín 67'; Tamuz 83'	Stadium: Ion Oblemenco; Attendance: 14,000; Referee: Alexandru Tudor

31 August 2014 6	Petrolul Ploiești	1–2	CFR Cluj	Ploiești
	Teixeira 54'	Report	Jakoliš 40'; Tadé 85'	Stadium: Ilie Oană; Attendance: 6,500; Referee: Sebastian Colțescu

15 September 2014 7	Pandurii Târgu Jiu	1–1	Petrolul Ploiești	Târgu Jiu
	Roman 3'	Report	De Lucas 43'	Stadium: Tudor Vladimirescu; Attendance: 4,000; Referee: Lucian Rusandru

21 September 2014 8	Petrolul Ploiești	2–3	Steaua București	Ploiești
	Tamuz 28', 58'	Report	Chipciu 13'; Keșerü 17'; Varela 72'	Stadium: Ilie Oană; Attendance: 14,000; Referee: Cristian Balaj

28 September 2014 9	Viitorul Constanța	1–3	Petrolul Ploiești	Chiajna
	Daminuță 38'	Report	Tamuz 72' (pen.); Astafei 82', 90+2'	Stadium: Concordia; Attendance: 1,500; Referee: Adrian Comănescu

4 October 2014 10	Petrolul Ploiești	1–0	Gaz Metan Mediaș	Ploiești
	Astafei 12'	Report		Stadium: Ilie Oană; Attendance: 4,000; Referee: Robert Dumitru

20 October 2014 11	Petrolul Ploiești	2–0	Ceahlăul Piatra Neamț	Ploiești
	Geraldo 24'; Tamuz 87'	Report		Stadium: Ilie Oană; Attendance: 6,000; Referee: Istvan Kovacs

27 October 2014 12	Astra Giurgiu	0–0	Petrolul Ploiești	Giurgiu
		Report		Stadium: Marin Anastasovici; Referee: Alexandru Tudor

3 November 2014 13	Petrolul Ploiești	0–0	Oțelul Galați	Ploiești
		Report		Stadium: Ilie Oană; Attendance: 7,000; Referee: Marcel Bârsan

8 November 2014 14	Universitatea Cluj	0–3	Petrolul Ploiești	Cluj
		Report	Tamuz 36'; Alcénat 45+1'; Albín 70'	Stadium: Cluj Arena; Attendance: 7,000; Referee: Cristian Balaj; Man of the Match: Tamuz

23 November 2014 15	Petrolul Ploiești	2–0	ASA Târgu Mureș	Ploiești
	Albín 16'; Geraldo 21'	Report		Stadium: Ilie Oană; Attendance: 7,500; Referee: Lucian Rusandu; Man of the Match: Alcenat

30 November 2014 16	Dinamo București	0–0	Petrolul Ploiești	Bucharest
		Report		Stadium: Dinamo; Attendance: 3,300; Referee: Cristian Balaj; Man of the Match: Peçanha

8 December 2014 17	Petrolul Ploiești	2–2	Concordia Chiajna	Ploiești
	Astafei 5'; Teixeira 61'	Report	Dina 15'; Florea 25' (pen.)	Stadium: Ilie Oană; Attendance: 7,000; Referee: Cătălin Popa; Man of the Match: Peçanha

20 February 2015 18	Petrolul Ploiești	1–0	FC Brașov	Ploiești
	Teixeira 73'	Report		Stadium: Ilie Oană; Attendance: 6,500; Referee: Marius Avram; Man of the Match: Filipe Teixeira

27 February 2015 19	FC Botoșani	0–1	Petrolul Ploiești	Botoșani
		Report	Teixeira 48' (pen.)	Stadium: Stadionul Municipal; Attendance: 5,000; Referee: Alexandru Tudor; Man of the Match: Filipe Teixeira

9 March 2015 20	Petrolul Ploiești	0–2	CSMS Iași	Ploiești
		Report	Ciucur 6'; Braga 73'	Stadium: Ilie Oană; Attendance: 5,500; Referee: Robert Dumitru

13 March 2015 21	Rapid București	1–1	Petrolul Ploiești	București
	Săpunaru 60'	Report	Teixeira 64'	Stadium: Giulești; Attendance: 8,000; Referee: Ovidiu Hațegan

13 March 2015 22	Petrolul Ploiești	1–2	CSU Craiova	Ploiești
	Astafei 48'	Report	Rocha 6'; Brandán 51' (pen.)	Stadium: Ilie Oană; Attendance: 5,500; Referee: Cristian Balaj

22 March 2015 23	CFR Cluj	0–1	Petrolul Ploiești	Cluj-Napoca
			Teixeira 45' (pen.)	Stadium: Stadionul Dr. Constantin Rădulescu; Attendance: 2,500; Referee: Radu Petrescu

6 April 2015 24	Petrolul Ploiești	0–1	Pandurii Târgu Jiu	Ploiești
		Report	Momčilović 14'	Stadium: Ilie Oană; Attendance: 4,500; Referee: Iulian Dima

9 April 2015 25	Steaua București	0–1	Petrolul Ploiești	București
		Report	Nepomuceno 90'	Stadium: Steaua; Attendance: 5,000; Referee: Radu Petrescu

13 April 2015 26	Petrolul Ploiești	1–2	Viitorul Constanța	Ploiești
	Vasilache 89'	Report	Mitrea 11'; Manea 67'	Stadium: Ilie Oană; Attendance: 4,500; Referee: Alexandru Tudor

18 April 2015 27	Gaz Metan Mediaș	0–0	Petrolul Ploiești	Mediaș
		Report		Stadium: Municipal; Attendance: 2,000; Referee: Adrian Comănescu

27 April 2015 28	Ceahlăul Piatra Neamț	1–1	Petrolul Ploiești	Piatra Neamț
	Stana 47'	Report	Marković 92' (o.g.)	Stadium: Ceahlăul; Attendance: 1,000; Referee: George Rădulescu

30 April 2015 29	Petrolul Ploiești	1–2	Astra Giurgiu	Ploiești
	Tamuz 52' (pen.)	Report	Seto 83'; Alibec 87'	Stadium: Ilie Oană; Attendance: 2,500; Referee: Horaţiu Feşnic

4 May 2015 30	Oțelul Galați	1–1	Petrolul Ploiești	Galați
	Cernat 51'	Report	Kronaveter 27'	Stadium: Oțelul; Attendance: 7,000; Referee: Marcel Bârsan

9 May 2015 31	Petrolul Ploiești	1–0	Universitatea Cluj	Ploiești
	Ipša 53'	Report		Stadium: Ilie Oană; Attendance: 4,000; Referee: Lucian Rusandu

16 May 2015 32	ASA Târgu Mureș	1–0	Petrolul Ploiești	Târgu Mureș
	Voiculeț 86'	Report		Stadium: Trans-Sil; Attendance: 6,000; Referee: Radu Petrescu

22 May 2015 33	Petrolul Ploiești	0–3	Dinamo București	Ploiești
			Gavrilă 28'; Elhamed 30'; Grozav 90'	Stadium: Ilie Oană; Attendance: 8,000; Referee: Cătălin Popa

27 May 2015 34	Concordia Chiajna	3–2	Petrolul Ploiești	Chiajna
	Cristea 17'; Purece 59'; Pena 73'		N'Koyi 11'; Kronaveter 52'	Stadium: Concordia; Attendance: 3,000; Referee: George Găman

Last updated: 27 May 2015

=== Cupa României ===
==== Round of 32 ====
24 September 2014	Unirea Jucu	0–3	Petrolul Ploiești	Cluj Arena, Cluj-Napoca
		Report	Astafei 24', 56'; N'Koyi 31'	Referee: Florin Andrei; Man of the Match: Astafei

==== Round of 16 ====
30 October 2014	Rapid CFR Suceava	2–3	Petrolul Ploiești	Stadionul Municipal, Botoșani
	Matei 56'; Sumanariu 69'	Report	Ipša 27'; Velescu 57' (o.g.); Haddad 60'	Referee: Iulian Călin

==== Quarter-finals ====
4 December 2014	ASA Târgu Mureș	0–1	Petrolul Ploiești	Stadionul Trans-Sil, Târgu Mureș
		Report	Albín 88'	Referee: Ovidiu Hațegan; Man of the Match: Albín

==== Semi-finals ====
5 March 2015 First leg	Petrolul Ploiești	1–1	Steaua București	Ilie Oană, Ploiești
	Tchité 22'	Report	Chipciu 90+4'	Attendance: 10,000; Referee: Adrian Comănescu

2 April 2015 Second leg	Steaua București	3–1	Petrolul Ploiești	Arena Națională, București
	Popa 21'; Iancu 33'; Tănase 69'	Report	Ipša 71'	Referee: George Găman

Last updated: 5 April 2015

=== Cupa Ligii ===
==== Round of 16 ====
20 July 2014	Universitatea Cluj	1–0	Petrolul Ploiești	Cluj Arena, Cluj-Napoca
	Kovács 31'			Attendance: 3,000; Referee: Lucian Rusandu

Last updated: 21 July 2014

=== UEFA Europa League ===
==== Qualifying rounds ====
===== Second qualifying round =====
17 July 2014 First leg	Petrolul Ploiești (Romania)	2–0	(Albania) Flamurtari Vlorë	Stadionul Ilie Oană, Ploiești
18:30 CEST (UTC+2)	Nepomuceno 77'; Tamuz 84'	Report		Referee: Ken Henry Johnsen (Norway)

24 July 2014 Second leg	Flamurtari Vlorë (Albania)	1–3 (1–5 agg.)	(Romania) Petrolul Ploiești	Stadiumi Flamurtari, Vlorë
19:00 CEST (UTC+2)	Lena 37'	Report	Teixeira 39'; De Lucas 83'; Priso 90'	Referee: Ján Valášek (Slovakia)

===== Third qualifying round =====
31 July 2014 First leg	Petrolul Ploiești (Romania)	1–1	(Czech Republic) Viktoria Plzeň	Stadionul Ilie Oană, Ploiești
20:00 CEST (UTC+2)	Mutu 76'	Report	Kolář 90+1'	Referee: Anthony Taylor (England)

7 August 2014 Second leg	Viktoria Plzeň (Czech Republic)	1–4 (2–5 agg.)	(Romania) Petrolul Ploiești	Doosan Arena, Plzeň
20:00 CEST (UTC+2)	Pilař 40'	Report	Teixeira 20'; Mutu 38'; De Lucas 43'; Tamuz 69'	Referee: Benoît Millot (France)

===== Play-off round =====
21 August 2014 First leg	Petrolul Ploiești (Romania)	1–3	(Croatia) Dinamo Zagreb	Stadionul Ilie Oană, Ploiești
19:15 CEST (UTC+2)	Tamuz 45'	Report	Čop 29' (pen.), 80'; Machado 90+6'	Referee: Daniele Orsato (Italy)

28 August 2014 Second leg	Dinamo Zagreb (Croatia)	2–1 (5–2 agg.)	(Romania) Petrolul Ploiești	Stadion Maksimir, Zagreb
21:00 CEST (UTC+2)	Čop 22'; Antolić 90+5'	Report	Albín 59'	Referee: Ivan Kružliak (Slovakia)

Last updated: 29 August 2014

== Squad statistics ==
=== Goals ===
Updated as of 27 May 2015.

Rank	Player	Position	Liga I	Europa League^{1}	Cupa României	Total
1	(Israel) Toto Tamuz	CF	11	3	0	14
2	(Portugal) Filipe Teixeira	LW	8	2	0	10
3	(Uruguay) Juan Albín	AM	5	1	1	7
3	(Romania) Victoraș Astafei	RW	5	0	2	7
4	(Romania) Adrian Mutu	AM	2	2	0	4
5	(Spain) Pablo de Lucas	DM	1	2	0	3
5	(Croatia) Kristijan Ipša	CB	1	0	2	3
6	(Portugal) Geraldo Alves	CB	2	0	0	2
6	(Curaçao) G. Nepomuceno	LW	1	1	0	2
6	(Netherlands) Patrick N'Koyi	CF	1	0	1	2
6	(Slovenia) Rok Kronaveter	DM	2	0	0	2
7	(Haiti) Jean Sony Alcénat	RB	1	0	0	1
7	(Israel) Shai Haddad	DM	0	0	1	1
7	(Cameroon) Njongo Priso	RW	0	1	0	1
7	(Burundi) Mohamed Tchité	CF	0	0	1	1
7	(Romania) Ciprian Vasilache	CM	1	0	0	1
Total			41	12	8	61

^{1} Includes qualifying rounds and play-off round.

== Pre-season and friendlies ==
Win Draw Loss

23 June 2014 Friendly	Petrolul Ploiești (Romania)	5–0	(Russia) Volga Novgorod	Maribor, Slovenia
	Morar 8'; Nepomuceno 16'; Tamuz 35', 39'; Mutu 45'	Report		Stadium: Play Green Football Resort Pohorje

26 June 2014 Friendly	Petrolul Ploiești (Romania)	2–0	(Croatia) Dinamo Zagreb	Murska Sobota, Slovenia
	Mutu 40'; Satli 52'	Report		Stadium: Fazanerija City Stadium

29 June 2014 Friendly	Petrolul Ploiești (Romania)	2–0	(Croatia) Slaven Belupo	Maribor, Slovenia
	Mustivar 45'; N'Koyi 58'	Report		Stadium: Play Green Football Resort Pohorje

2 July 2014 Friendly	Maribor (Slovenia)	1–2	(Romania) Petrolul Ploiești	Maribor, Slovenia
	Bohar 36'	Report	Gerson 73'; Mutu 87' (pen.)	Stadium: Ljudski vrt Referee: Alen Borošak

4 July 2014 Friendly	Petrolul Ploiești (Romania)	1–0	(Serbia) Partizan Belgrade	Maribor, Slovenia
	Mutu 28'	Report		Stadium: Play Green Football Resort Pohorje

10 October 2014 Friendly	Petrolul Ploiești (Romania)	3–0	(Romania) Viitorul Constanța	Ploiești, Romania
	Astafei 34'; Ipša 41'; Mareș 67'	Report		Stadium: Ilie Oană

15 November 2014 Friendly	Petrolul Ploiești (Romania)	2–0	(Romania) Oțelul Galați	Ploiești, Romania
	Ipša 5'; Mareș 86'	Report		Stadium: Ilie Oană

23 January 2015 Friendly	Petrolul Ploiești (Romania)	0–1	(Azerbaijan) Neftchi Baku	Antalya, Turkey
		Report	Silva 36'	Stadium: Mardan Sports Complex

26 January 2015 Friendly	Petrolul Ploiești (Romania)	0–0	(China) Guangzhou R&F	Antalya, Turkey
		Report		Stadium: Mardan Sports Complex

28 January 2015 Friendly	Petrolul Ploiești (Romania)	0–1	(Poland) Podbeskidzie	Antalya, Turkey
		Report	Malinowski 40'	Stadium: Mardan Sports Complex

10 February 2015 Friendly	Petrolul Ploiești (Romania)	1–1	(Bulgaria) Levski Sofia	Antalya, Turkey
	Mareș 84'	Report	Domovchiyski 69'	Stadium: Mardan Sports Complex

12 February 2015 Friendly	Petrolul Ploiești (Romania)	0–1	(Bulgaria) CSKA Sofia	Antalya, Turkey
		Report	Joachim 39'	Stadium: Mardan Sports Complex

Last updated: 15 February 2015

== See also ==
- 2014–15 Cupa României
- 2014–15 Cupa Ligii
- 2014–15 Liga I
- 2014–15 UEFA Europa League
