= Alexandru Radu =

Alexandru Radu may refer to:

- Alexandru Radu (footballer, born 1997), Romanian footballer for Petrolul Ploiești
- Alexandru Radu (footballer, born 1982), Romanian former footballer.
- Alexandru Coconul, Prince of Wallachia, born 1623
