= Pastorini =

Pastorini is a surname, and may refer to:

- Dan Pastorini (born 1949), American football player
- Manlio Pastorini (1879–1942), Italian gymnast
- Rodrigo Pastorini (born 1990), Uruguayan footballer
- Signor Pastorini, pseudonym of Charles Walmesley (1722–1797), Roman Catholic Titular Bishop of Rama and Vicar Apostolic of the Western District of England
