= Adrian Mutu =

Romanian footballer and manager (born 1979)

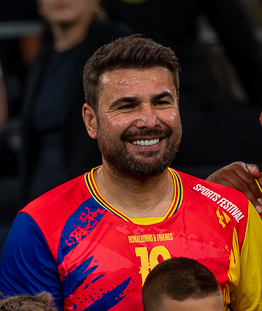
- Mutu in 2025

Personal information
- Date of birth: 8 January 1979 (age 47)
- Place of birth: Călinești, Romania
- Height: 1.81 m (5 ft 11 in)
- Positions: Forward; attacking midfielder

Youth career
- 1987–1996: Argeș Pitești

Senior career*
Years	Team	Apps	(Gls)
1996–1998	Argeș Pitești	41	(11)
1999	Dinamo București	33	(22)
2000	Inter Milan	10	(0)
2000–2002	Hellas Verona	57	(16)
2002–2003	Parma	31	(18)
2003–2004	Chelsea	27	(6)
2005	Livorno	0	(0)
2005–2006	Juventus	33	(7)
2006–2011	Fiorentina	112	(54)
2011–2012	Cesena	28	(8)
2012–2014	Ajaccio	37	(11)
2014	Petrolul Ploiești	14	(4)
2015	Pune City	10	(4)
2016	ASA Târgu Mureș	4	(0)
Total		439	(161)

International career
1995	Romania U16	2	(1)
1996–1997	Romania U18	14	(8)
1998–2000	Romania U21	12	(6)
2000–2013	Romania	77	(35)

Managerial career
- 2016: ASA Târgu Mureș (player/assistant)
- 2016–2017: Dinamo București (general manager)
- 2018: Voluntari
- 2018–2019: Al Wahda U21
- 2020–2021: Romania U21
- 2021: FC U Craiova
- 2022–2023: Rapid București
- 2023: Neftchi Baku
- 2024: CFR Cluj
- 2024–2025: Petrolul Ploiești
- * Club domestic league appearances and goals

Adrian Mutu (Romanian pronunciation: [adriˈan ˈmutu]; born 8 January 1979) is a Romanian professional football manager and former player. During his playing career, he was deployed as a forward or an attacking midfielder.

Mutu started his career playing two years for Argeș Pitești and one year for Dinamo București, before joining Inter Milan in Italy midway through the 1999–2000 Serie A season. After only ten games with the Nerazzurri, he left for Hellas Verona and then Parma, for which he scored 39 goals in the next three years. His excellent form brought him a €22.5 million transfer to Chelsea and a nomination for the Ballon d'Or in 2003. Following a failed drug test, he was released and returned to Serie A to join Juventus. After the 2006 Italian football scandal and the relegation of Juventus to Serie B, Mutu decided to join Fiorentina, where he played consistently for the next five years. He then had a season at Cesena and French club Ajaccio, before returning to his native country with Petrolul Ploiești in 2014. After two more brief spells with Pune City and ASA Târgu Mureș, Mutu retired from professional football in 2016.

A controversial figure off the field, Mutu received widespread attention following a positive test for cocaine while playing for Chelsea in 2005, which resulted in his immediate release from the club, a subsequent seven-month ban from the Football Association, and an order to pay £15.2 million in damages to his former employers, the largest financial penalty in FIFA history. He has unsuccessfully tried to appeal the fine numerous times, and was banned for a second time in 2010 following a positive test for sibutramine while at Fiorentina.

From his international debut in 2000, Mutu played 77 matches for the Romania national team and scored 35 goals, making him the joint all-time top-scorer alongside Gheorghe Hagi. He was included in the country's squads at the UEFA European Championship in 2000 and 2008. Mutu earned the Romanian Footballer of the Year award four times, a total surpassed only by Gheorghe Popescu and Gheorghe Hagi, who have won six and seven times, respectively.

== Club career ==
=== Argeș Pitești ===
Mutu was born on 8 January 1979 in Călinești, Romania and began playing junior-level football in 1987 at Argeș Pitești. He made his Divizia A debut at age 18 on 16 March 1997, when coach Ion Moldovan sent him to replace Marcel Abăluță for the final minutes of a 0–0 draw against Oțelul Galați. Mutu scored his first goal in the competition on 18 October in a 3–1 home win over Steaua București. Subsequently, he played six games in the 1998–99 UEFA Cup and scored once against Dinamo Baku and twice against İstanbulspor, helping Argeș get past these teams in the qualifying rounds, but they were defeated by Celta Vigo in the first round. During these years, Mutu formed an offensive partnership with Constantin Barbu.

=== Dinamo București ===
In the middle of the 1998–99 season, Mutu was transferred from Argeș to Dinamo București for a €600,000 fee. He scored four goals against Mondercange in the qualifying round of the 1999–2000 UEFA Cup, but his side was defeated in the following round by Benfica. Domestically, in the first half of the 1999–2000 season, Mutu scored 18 goals in the 18 matches coach Cornel Dinu used him, including netting a goal in a 1–1 draw against rivals Steaua. He was part of an offensive trio alongside Marius Niculae and Adrian Mihalcea, while also having Ion Vlădoiu as a competitor. He left in the middle of the season to go to Inter Milan, but Dinamo managed to win The Double without him. During this period, Mutu also earned the nickname "Briliantul" (The Brilliant) in reference to a brilliant-cut diamond.

=== Inter Milan ===
At the turn of the millennium, he signed for Inter Milan. The selling club reported the fee as $2.1 million while the buyers said it was $7.15 million, leading to an investigation by Romanian tax authorities in 2006.

Mutu made his Serie A debut on 6 January 2000, when coach Marcello Lippi sent him in the 82nd minute to replace Clarence Seedorf in a 5–0 home win over Perugia. He scored two goals in the Coppa Italia in the quarter-finals victory against rivals AC Milan and in the semi-finals win over Cagliari. Subsequently, he played as a starter in the final which was lost 2–1 to Lazio. Mutu had a hard time finding a place in Inter's first XI, as he had to compete with strikers such as Ronaldo, Christian Vieri, Roberto Baggio, Iván Zamorano and Álvaro Recoba.

=== Verona ===
In 2000, Mutu was sold by Inter to Verona in a co-ownership deal, for 7,500 million lire (€3,873,427). The Veneto side also signed Massimo Oddo, Mauro Camoranesi (later a teammate at Juventus), and young rising star Alberto Gilardino (later a teammate at Parma and Fiorentina) that season. He netted his first two Serie A goals in a 2–0 victory against Lazio on 22 October 2000. As Verona faced fellow strugglers Bari on matchday 18 in February 2001, Mutu came off the bench with Verona down a man and trailing 0–1 and scored two goals, while also providing an assist for Camoranesi's goal, inspiring Verona to a 3–2 victory. The club narrowly avoided relegation through winning the relegation tie-breaker playoffs. In June 2001, Verona bought Mutu outright, for 5,100 million lire (€2,633,930). In the following season, he scored 12 goals but could not avoid the team's relegation to Serie B.

=== Parma ===
In the summer of 2002, Mutu was transferred from Verona to Parma for a €10 million fee. In the first round of the 2002–03 season, he scored one goal under coach Cesare Prandelli to help the team earn a 4–3 victory against Brescia. Mutu helped Parma eliminate CSKA Moscow by scoring three goals in the 4–3 aggregate victory in the first round of the UEFA Cup, with their campaign ending in the following round as they lost to Wisła Kraków against whom he scored once. In his single season spent with The Crusaders, he formed an impressive striking duo with Adriano, scoring 18 goals in 31 league appearances.

=== Chelsea ===
On 12 August 2003, Chelsea paid Parma €22.5m (around £15.8m) for Mutu, who signed a five-year contract. The transfer was part of new owner Roman Abramovich's spending spree, as the club also acquired Hernán Crespo, Claude Makélélé, Damien Duff, Juan Sebastián Verón and Joe Cole among others. Mutu's transfer fee was the most expensive ever paid for a Romanian player until Radu Drăgușin was transferred from Genoa to Tottenham Hotspur for €25 million in 2024.

Mutu made his Premier League debut on 23 August 2003 under coach Claudio Ranieri, and scored the winning goal from distance in a 2–1 home victory against Leicester City. Mutu continued to score in the next two matches, as he netted a goal following a pass from Frank Lampard in a 2–2 draw against Blackburn Rovers and a brace in a 4–2 win at Stamford Bridge over Tottenham Hotspur. On 1 November 2003, he scored the only goal of a 1–0 victory against Everton, after a pass from Geremi. Subsequently, he netted once in a 4–0 win over Leicester. In the same season, Mutu also played in the 2003–04 Champions League, netting a goal in a 2–1 victory against Lazio in the group stage. In the second match against Lazio, Mutu was spat at by Siniša Mihajlović, who received an eight-match ban. After helping Chelsea eliminate cross-town rivals Arsenal in the quarter-finals, Mutu missed the semi-finals, where the team was defeated by AS Monaco.

In the 2004–05 season, Mutu had a difficult relationship with the club's new manager José Mourinho, with each accusing the other of lying about whether the player was injured for a 2006 World Cup qualifying match against the Czech Republic. In September 2004, Mutu was banned from football for seven months until May 2005 after testing positive for cocaine use.

=== Juventus ===
Mutu signed a five-year contract with the Italian club Juventus on 12 January 2005, despite still being banned from football until 18 May. As Juventus had no available room to buy another non-EU player from abroad, the move also involved fellow Serie A club Livorno, who signed the player and simultaneously sold him to Juventus. He had to compete for a place in the team's starting lineup with strikers Alessandro Del Piero, Zlatan Ibrahimović and David Trezeguet. Mutu was sent on by coach Fabio Capello in extra time to replace Jonathan Zebina in the 1–0 loss to Inter Milan in the 2005 Supercoppa Italiana. Subsequently, he scored one goal in a 3–0 victory against Rapid Wien in the 2005–06 Champions League group stage, helping the team reach the quarter-finals where they were defeated by Arsenal. Mutu won two league titles with Juventus, but both were revoked due to the Calciopoli scandal.

=== Fiorentina ===
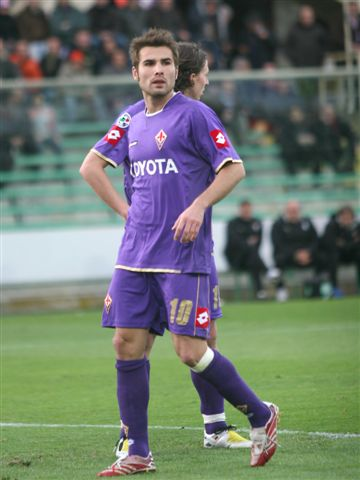
Mutu with Fiorentina during their 2007–08 season.

On 8 July 2006, Fiorentina announced that they had signed Mutu for €8 million. There, Mutu became a teammate of compatriot Bogdan Lobonț.

He scored his first goal on 20 September in a 1–0 victory against Parma. Mutu formed an offensive partnership with Luca Toni, with both of them scoring 16 goals by the end of the 2006–07 season. Afterwards, he netted three goals in the 3–1 aggregate win over PSV Eindhoven in the 2007–08 UEFA Cup quarter-finals, but the campaign ended in the semi-finals where they were defeated by Rangers.

In July 2008, AS Roma made a reported €18 to 20 million offer to sign him outright, but Mutu hinted that he may remain in Florence and eventually signed a contract extending until 2012. Coach Prandelli praised his importance within the team: "Mutu is irreplaceable at Fiorentina. We cannot afford to lose our best player now, when extraordinary investments have been made and we have the Champions League ahead of us". He started to form an offensive duo with Gilardino at the start of the 2008–09 season. Mutu scored one goal in a 1–1 draw against Bayern Munich in the 2008–09 Champions League group stage. On 15 February 2009, he scored a hat-trick in a 3–3 draw against Genoa, coming back from 0–3.

Mutu netted three goals in the 2009–10 Champions League group stage, scoring in both victories against Debrecen. On 29 January 2010, it was reported that Mutu failed a doping test after a Coppa Italia match against Lazio nine days earlier, in which he scored twice to help Fiorentina win 3–2. He was suspended for nine months.

=== Cesena ===
On 23 June 2011, it was officially announced that Cesena had signed Mutu on a two-year contract. On 15 January 2012, Mutu scored two goals in a 3–1 win over Novara and took his tally to 101 goals in Serie A. After scoring the first goal, Mutu ran to the bench, grabbed a T-shirt, and held it up to the cameras, revealing the message: "100 times. Quiet! Just Mutu!". Following a couple of unconvincing games, on 11 April, Mutu scored a goal against Genoa, which eventually earned a draw for Cesena. In the summer of 2012, after Cesena suffered relegation to Serie B, the two parties ended the contract by mutual consent. Mutu recorded a total of 271 matches and 103 goals in Serie A.

=== Ajaccio ===
After his release from Cesena, Mutu signed a new contract with AC Ajaccio of the French Ligue 1 on 28 August 2012. He dismissed claims that he was preparing for retirement, and stated that he would score more goals than Zlatan Ibrahimović of Paris Saint-Germain. Club president Alain Orsoni said that Mutu was the highest-profile player to come to Corsica since Johnny Rep joined SC Bastia in 1978.

Mutu made his Ligue 1 debut on 16 September 2012, when coach Alex Dupont sent him in the 62nd minute to replace Chahir Belghazouani in a 2–0 away loss to Lyon. He scored his first goal on 28 October in a 2–2 draw against Lorient. Mutu netted a total of 11 goals by the end of the season, including two doubles in a victory against Lyon and a loss to Saint-Étienne.

After his goal haul in the previous season helped keep Ajaccio in Ligue 1, Mutu played just nine games in his second season without scoring before terminating his contract on 14 January 2014 alongside compatriot Ștefan Popescu.

=== Petrolul Ploiești ===
In January 2014, Mutu was presented at Petrolul Ploiești in front of 10,000 fans. He was signed at the request of the team's coach, his former international teammate, Cosmin Contra. On 28 April, he scored his first goal for the club in a 3–0 victory against FC Botoșani. In the summer of 2014, Mutu scored both home and away against Viktoria Plzeň in the Europa League third qualifying round, a double which Petrolul won 5–2 on aggregate.

On 26 September 2014, Petrolul announced that the club had terminated the contract with Mutu.

=== Pune City ===
On 30 July 2015, Mutu signed as the marquee player for Indian Super League club Pune City. He made his league debut on 6 October, when coach David Platt sent him in the 61st minute to substitute Tuncay Şanlı, managing to provide an assist for Israil Gurung's goal in the 3–1 win over Mumbai City. On 8 November, Mutu scored his first goal in a 2–2 draw against Goa. He scored three more goals for Pune in three losses to Delhi Dynamos, Atlético de Kolkata and NorthEast United.

=== ASA Târgu Mureș ===
In January 2016, Mutu returned to Romania with ASA Târgu Mureș, having been assured by Romania's national manager Anghel Iordănescu that he could have a place in the UEFA Euro 2016 squad if he played in a better league than India's. However, he made only four goalless league appearances, retiring afterwards.

== International career ==
=== Early years and Euro 2000 ===
Mutu made his debut for Romania on 29 March 2000, playing as a starter under coach Emerich Jenei in the 2–0 friendly loss to Greece. Subsequently, in his following match, which was also a friendly, he scored his first goal in a 2–0 home win over Cyprus.

Mutu was selected by Jenei to be part of the squad that went to Euro 2000. In the first group game, which was a 1–1 draw against Germany, he came onto the pitch in the 75th minute to replace Gheorghe Hagi. In the 1–0 loss to Portugal, Mutu did not play, but he played the entire match in the 3–2 win over England. Romania qualified to the quarter-finals, where Mutu played the full 90 minutes in the 2–0 loss to Italy.

He played seven matches without scoring in the 2002 World Cup qualifiers, including both legs of the play-off against Slovenia, which ended in a 3–2 aggregate defeat. Afterwards, he played seven matches and scored four goals during the Euro 2004 qualifiers. Mutu started the 2006 World Cup qualifiers by netting two goals in the first two matches which were both 2–1 victories against Finland and Macedonia. He continued the scoring by managing two doubles in two 2–0 wins over Andorra and Czech Republic, and also the only goal in a 1–0 victory against Finland.

=== Euro 2008 ===
Mutu was Romania's top-scorer with six goals netted during the successful Euro 2008 qualifiers, which helped his side earn two victories against Belarus, and one victory against each of Albania, Luxembourg and Slovenia. On 25 March 2008, he was decorated by the president of Romania, Traian Băsescu, with the Ordinul "Meritul Sportiv" – (The Medal of "Sportive Merit") Class III for his performance in those qualifiers. He was used by coach Victor Pițurcă as a starter in all three games in the final tournament which were two draws against France and Italy, and a loss to the Netherlands, as his side failed to progress from their group. In the 1–1 draw against the Italians, Mutu scored Romania's only goal in the tournament, but in the same match he had a second-half penalty saved by goalkeeper Gianluigi Buffon.

=== Final years ===
He made three goalless appearances during the 2010 World Cup qualifiers, but netted five goals in five matches in the Euro 2012 qualifiers, including one goal in a 3–0 win over Bosnia and Herzegovina and two doubles in a victory against Luxembourg and a draw against Belarus respectively. Mutu scored his last goal for Romania in a 1–1 draw against rivals Hungary in the 2014 World Cup qualifiers. During those same qualifiers, he made his last appearance for the national team in a 4–0 loss to the Netherlands. Mutu scored 35 goals in his 77 matches for Romania, which made him the team's all-time top-scorer, tied with Gheorghe Hagi.

On 12 June 2022, Mutu organized his testimonial game, played at Cluj Arena in front of 20,000 fans, featuring a team of Romanian All-Stars against a team of international All-Stars. He played the first half for the Romanians and the second for the internationals, scoring Romania's first goal, as the match ended in a 3–3 draw.

== Style of play ==
A highly skilful and creative player, with an eye for goal, who was, however, troubled by off-field issues throughout his career, Mutu was capable of playing in several offensive positions, and was used as a supporting forward, as a main striker, as a winger, and also as an attacking midfielder, due to his ability to both score and assist goals. Often compared to compatriot Gheorghe Hagi, in his prime, Mutu was a quick and mobile player, with excellent technical skills and dribbling ability, and was also an accurate set-piece and penalty-kick taker. Despite his talent, he was often prone to injury and accused of inconsistency throughout his career, and was also notorious for his temperamental character and behaviour on the pitch; because of this, he was often regarded as not having lived up to his true potential.

== Managerial career ==
After retiring from professional football in 2016, Mutu began a career in football administration. On 12 October 2016, he was appointed general manager of Dinamo București, becoming part of the club's executive management. He left Dinamo București in October 2017 and subsequently joined the Romanian Football Federation (FRF). On 11 October 2017, he was appointed sports manager within the federation's technical department, where he was responsible for relations between the Romanian national team and the clubs of its players, both in Romania and abroad.

He later moved into coaching and was appointed head coach of Liga I club Voluntari in April 2018, signing a two-year contract following the departure of Claudiu Niculescu. However, his tenure lasted just two months, a period during which he managed to save the club from relegation, winning a play-off against Chindia Târgoviște.

In July 2018, Mutu was appointed by United Arab Emirates club Al Wahda as manager of their reserve team. On 15 January 2020, he was named coach of Romania's under-21 national team. During this spell, he handed a debut to Radu Drăgușin at under-21 international level. Mutu helped Romania qualify to the 2021 European Under-21 Championship, as the team finished second in its qualification group behind Denmark, but above Ukraine, Finland, Northern Ireland and Malta. In the final tournament, Mutu led them to a win over Hungary and draws against the Netherlands and Germany, but they did not get past the group stage, finishing third on equal points with the last two while having a lower goal difference than them.

On 28 May 2021, Mutu was appointed head coach of Liga I club FC U Craiova, but was dismissed in early October due to a string of poor results. In March 2022, he became coach of Rapid București. He helped Rapid finish in fifth place at the end of the 2022–23 season.

On 11 July 2023, Neftçi announced the appointment of Mutu as their new coach. On 24 December 2023, as the team was in sixth place, Mutu left his role as head coach of Neftçi after his contract was terminated by mutual agreement.

On 24 January 2024, Mutu was appointed as manager of Liga I club CFR Cluj. On 3 April, he resigned from CFR, following a 4–0 loss to Corvinul Hunedoara in the Cupa României quarter-finals. On 31 December 2024, Mutu was presented as the new coach of Petrolul Ploiești. After the team earned two victories, three draws and five losses under his tenure, Mutu left the club in March 2025.

== Personal life ==
Mutu was in a relationship with Israeli model and actress Moran Atias during the early 2000s. He was also in relationships with American singer Blu Cantrell and Venezuelan actress and model Aída Yéspica.

From 2000 to 2003, Mutu was married to the Romanian actress and television presenter Alexandra Dinu with whom he has a son, Mario (born 2002). Gheorghe Hagi was their wedding godparent (naș). (Note: In the Romanian Orthodox tradition, wedding godparents (nași) serve as spiritual sponsors of the marriage, participating in the religious ceremony and traditionally providing guidance and support to the couple throughout their married life.)

In 2005, Mutu married Consuelo Matos Gómez, a Dominican model, at the Romanian Orthodox Scala Celli church in Rome. They have two daughters, Adriana (born 2006) and Maya Vega (born 2008). They got divorced in 2013.

In 2016, he married Sandra Bachici, a former model, in Cuba. They have a son, Tiago Adrian (born 2017).

In 2004, Mutu was named an Honorary Citizen of Pitești for his achievements in national and international football and for promoting the image of Pitești Municipality and Romania worldwide. He was ranked 50th in the 2006 nationwide poll of the 100 Greatest Romanians.

In 2014, Mutu appeared in the music video for "Acrobat", a single by A-Roma featuring Snoop Dogg.

On 12 June 2022, Mutu published his autobiography, Revenirea din Infern (Return from Hell), written in collaboration with sports journalist Cătălin Oprișan.

In 2025, a four-part documentary series titled Il Fenomeno - Povestea unui Superstar was released, chronicling his life and playing career.

== Controversies ==
=== Failed doping test and breach of contract with Chelsea ===
During his Chelsea spell, in September 2004, Mutu was banned from football for seven months until May 2005 after testing positive for cocaine use. Chelsea started to seek compensation from Mutu in early 2005. The Football Association Premier League Appeals Committee decided that the player had committed a breach of his contract without just cause which made Chelsea eligible to claim the compensation. Mutu started his first appeal to the Court of Arbitration for Sport (CAS) in April 2005 but the case was dismissed in December 2005. On 11 May 2006, Chelsea applied to FIFA for an award of compensation against Mutu. In particular, the club requested that the FIFA Dispute Resolution Chamber (DRC) award compensation to the club following Mutu's breach of the employment contract without just cause. However, on 26 October, the DRC decided that it did not have jurisdiction to make a decision in the dispute and that the claim by the club was therefore not admissible. On 22 December, Chelsea lodged a new appeal before the CAS seeking the annulment of the DRC's decision. On 21 May 2007, a CAS panel allowed the club's appeal, set aside the DRC's decision, and referred the matter back to the DRC, "which does have jurisdiction to determine and impose the appropriate sporting sanction and/or order for compensation, if any, arising out of the dispute" between the Club and the Player."

On 7 May 2008, the FIFA Dispute Resolution Chamber ordered Mutu to pay €17,173,990 in compensation to his former club, Chelsea FC, for breach of contract. This included €16,500,000 for the unamortised portion of the transfer fee paid to Parma, €307,340 for the unamortised portion of the sign-on fee (received by Mutu), and €366,650 for the unamortised portion of the fee to the Agent, but was not to take into account the determination of the damages for the amounts already paid by the club to the player (consideration for services rendered) or the remaining value of the employment contract (valued at €10,858,500). Mutu had to pay within 30 days after being informed of the decision in August 2008. Mutu lodged an appeal with the Court of Arbitration for Sport for the second time, but on 31 July 2009, that court dismissed his appeal, and Mutu was ordered to pay Chelsea the amount plus interest of 5% p.a. starting on 12 September 2008 until the effective date of payment; the matter was submitted to the FIFA Disciplinary Committee for its determination. In addition, Mutu had to pay the costs of arbitration for both parties, including CHF 50,000 to Chelsea. The fine was the highest ever levied by FIFA.

Mutu could have been banned from football by FIFA if he did not pay the fine, although some lawyers disputed this. Mutu filed his third appeal with the Federal Supreme Court of Switzerland in October 2009. However, the court dismissed the appeal on 14 June 2010, upholding the order for Mutu to pay Chelsea €17m in damages. In 2013, FIFA DRC decided in a new ruling that Livorno and Juventus were also jointly liable to pay compensation; both clubs immediately appealed to the Court of Arbitration for Sport. On 21 January 2015 the Court of Arbitration for Sport annulled the FIFA DRC ruling; Mutu remained the sole party to pay the compensation.

In 2018, the European Court of Human Rights rejected Mutu's appeal against the CAS's 2015 ruling.

=== Failed doping test and breach of contract with Fiorentina ===
On 29 January 2010, it was reported that Mutu failed a doping test, as sibutramine was found in his body after a Coppa Italia match against Lazio nine days earlier, in which he scored twice to help Fiorentina win 3–2. The INOC was requested to hand Mutu a one-year ban by the Italian anti-doping prosecutor. He eventually received a nine-month ban on 19 April, and was suspended until 29 October. After the ban finished, Mutu was suspended by the club due to breach of contract (AWOL) on 7 January 2011. After such events, Mutu publicly apologised to the club and parted company with his agent Victor Becali; on 3 February 2011, Fiorentina announced the player was reinstated into the first team with immediate effect.

=== Bans from the Romania national team ===
In 2004, during a tournament in which Romania participated in the United States, Mutu had a verbal conflict with assistant coach Ștefan Iovan, after which head coach Victor Pițurcă decided to exclude him from the squad for the match against Colombia.

In October 2009, following a 5–0 loss to Serbia in the 2010 World Cup qualifiers, Mutu left Romania's training camp without the approval of coach Răzvan Lucescu to attend a party hosted by Ratko Butorović. Subsequently, Lucescu decided not to call him to the national team anymore. However, in March 2010, Lucescu decided to call him up for the matches against Bosnia and Herzegovina and Luxembourg.

On 11 August 2011, Mutu and his teammate Gabriel Tamaș were excluded by coach Pițurcă from the Romania squad after they were caught drinking in a bar the previous night, while the national team was preparing for a friendly match against San Marino. Their suspension was lifted after three games.

In March 2013, Mutu had a verbal conflict with coach Pițurcă, due to the latter's decision to not use him as a starter in a match against the Netherlands. Pițurcă then decided not to call him up anymore. On 21 November 2013, after not being called up for the 2014 World Cup play-off against Greece, Mutu posted an image of Pițurcă as Mr. Bean on Facebook.

=== Off-field fights and incidents ===
In 2006, before Romania's match against Bulgaria, Mutu got into a verbal confrontation with a waiter at a restaurant in Constanța. Subsequently, Mutu asked underworld figure Nuredin Beinur to bring the waiter to the hotel where the team was stationed. There, Mutu beat the waiter with a crowbar wrapped in a towel.

During his years spent at Fiorentina, Mutu was involved in several fights, starting with a confrontation in December 2009 against a Lebanese man who needed hospitalization afterwards. Subsequently, in April 2010, after a night spent at the Cavalli Club, his wife Consuelo was approached by two men, who started making advances towards her, but Mutu and his friends allegedly intervened to remove them and a brawl ensued between the two parties. In October 2010, Mutu beat a waiter, following a misunderstanding about the fee he had to pay at a restaurant. The waiter needed 25 days of hospitalization and in 2015 Mutu received a 14 months suspended sentence in the case.

The Romanian press reported that in 2015, Mutu got into a fight with fellow footballer Sabin Ilie in a restaurant in Bucharest. However, approximately a decade later, Ilie stated that it was only a verbal disagreement.

== Career statistics ==
=== Club ===
Appearances and goals by club, season and competition
Club	Season	League			National cup (Note: Includes Cupa României, Coppa Italia, FA Cup)		League cup (Note: Includes EFL Cup, Cupa Ligii)		Continental		Other		Total	
Club	Season	Division	Apps	Goals	Apps	Goals	Apps	Goals	Apps	Goals	Apps	Goals	Apps	Goals
Argeș Pitești	1996–97	Divizia A	5	0	0	0	—		—		—		5	0
Argeș Pitești	1997–98	Divizia A	21	4	0	0	—		—		—		21	4
Argeș Pitești	1998–99	Divizia A	15	7	0	0	—		6 (Note: Appearances in UEFA Cup)	3	—		21	10
Argeș Pitești	Total		41	11	0	0	—		6	3	—		47	14
Dinamo București	1998–99	Divizia A	17	4	1	0	—		—		—		18	4
Dinamo București	1999–00	Divizia A	18	18	3	3	—		4	4	—		25	25
Dinamo București	Total		35	22	4	3	—		4	4	—		43	29
Inter Milan	1999–00	Serie A	10	0	4	2	—		—		0	0	14	2
Hellas Verona	2000–01	Serie A	25	4	1	1	—		—		1 (Note: Appearance in Serie A relegation tie-breaker)	0	27	5
Hellas Verona	2001–02	Serie A	32	12	2	0	—		—		—		34	12
Hellas Verona	2002–03	Serie B	—		2	0	—		—		—		2	0
Hellas Verona	Total		57	16	5	1	—		—		1	0	63	17
Parma	2002–03	Serie A	31	18	1	0	—		4	4	—		36	22
Chelsea	2003–04	Premier League	25	6	3	3	1	0	7 (Note: Appearances in UEFA Champions League)	1	—		36	10
Chelsea	2004–05	Premier League	2	0	—		—		0	0	—		2	0
Chelsea	Total		27	6	3	3	1	0	7	1	—		38	10
Juventus	2004–05	Serie A	1	0	—		—		—		—		1	0
Juventus	2005–06	Serie A	32	7	4	3	—		8	1	1 (Note: Appearance in Supercoppa Italiana)	0	45	11
Juventus	Total		33	7	4	3	—		8	1	1	0	46	11
Fiorentina	2006–07	Serie A	33	16	2	1	—		—		—		35	17
Fiorentina	2007–08	Serie A	29	17	1	0	—		10	6	—		40	23
Fiorentina	2008–09	Serie A	19	13	1	0	—		9 (Note: Seven appearances and two goals in UEFA Champions League, two appearances in UEFA Cup)	2	—		29	15
Fiorentina	2009–10	Serie A	11	4	2	4	—		6	3	—		19	11
Fiorentina	2010–11	Serie A	20	4	0	0	—		—		—		20	4
Fiorentina	Total		112	54	6	5	—		25	11	—		143	70
Cesena	2011–12	Serie A	28	8	1	0	—		—		—		29	8
Ajaccio	2012–13	Ligue 1	28	11	0	0	0	0	—		—		28	11
Ajaccio	2013–14	Ligue 1	9	0	0	0	0	0	—		—		9	0
Ajaccio	Total		37	11	0	0	0	0	—		—		37	11
Petrolul Ploiești	2013–14	Liga I	8	2	0	0	—		—		—		8	2
Petrolul Ploiești	2014–15	Liga I	6	2	0	0	1	0	6 (Note: Appearances in UEFA Europa League)	2	—		13	4
Petrolul Ploiești	Total		14	4	0	0	1	0	6	2	—		21	6
Pune City	2015	Indian Super League	10	4	—		—		—		—		10	4
ASA Târgu Mureș	2015–16	Liga I	4	0	1	0	—		—		—		5	0
Career total			439	161	29	17	2	0	60	26	2	0	532	204

=== International ===
Appearances and goals by national team and year
National team	Year	Apps	Goals
Romania	2000	11	1
Romania	2001	6	0
Romania	2002	6	1
Romania	2003	10	7
Romania	2004	5	4
Romania	2005	5	5
Romania	2006	6	3
Romania	2007	9	6
Romania	2008	7	2
Romania	2009	2	0
Romania	2010	0	0
Romania	2011	5	5
Romania	2012	3	0
Romania	2013	2	1
Total		77	35

Scores and results list Romania's goal tally first, score column indicates score after each Mutu goal.

List of international goals scored by Adrian Mutu
No.	Date	Venue	Opponent	Score	Result	Competition
1	26 April 2000	Stadionul Farul, Constanța, Romania	Cyprus	1–0	2–0	Friendly
2	17 April 2002	Zdzislaw Krzyszkowiak Stadium, Bydgoszcz, Poland	Poland	2–0	2–1	Friendly
3	29 March 2003	Stadionul Național, Bucharest, Romania	Denmark	1–0	2–5	UEFA Euro 2004 qualifying
4	7 June 2003	Stadionul Ion Oblemenco, Craiova, Romania	Bosnia and Herzegovina	1–0	2–0	UEFA Euro 2004 qualifying
5	20 August 2003	Shakhtar Stadium, Donetsk, Ukraine	Ukraine	1–0	2–0	Friendly
6	20 August 2003	Shakhtar Stadium, Donetsk, Ukraine	Ukraine	2–0	2–0	Friendly
7	6 September 2003	Astra Stadium, Ploiești, Romania	Luxembourg	1–0	4–0	UEFA Euro 2004 qualifying
8	10 September 2003	Parken Stadium, Copenhagen, Denmark	Denmark	1–1	2–2	UEFA Euro 2004 qualifying
9	11 October 2003	Stadionul Dinamo, Bucharest, Romania	Japan	1–0	1–1	Friendly
10	18 February 2004	GSZ Stadium, Larnaca, Cyprus	Georgia	1–0	3–0	Friendly
11	18 February 2004	GSZ Stadium, Larnaca, Cyprus	Georgia	2–0	3–0	Friendly
12	18 August 2004	Stadionul Giulești, Bucharest, Romania	Finland	1–0	2–1	2006 FIFA World Cup qualification
13	4 September 2004	Stadionul Ion Oblemenco, Craiova, Romania	Macedonia	2–1	2–1	2006 FIFA World Cup qualification
14	17 August 2005	Stadionul Farul, Constanța, Romania	Andorra	1–0	2–0	2006 FIFA World Cup qualification
15	17 August 2005	Stadionul Farul, Constanța, Romania	Andorra	2–0	2–0	2006 FIFA World Cup qualification
16	3 September 2005	Stadionul Farul, Constanța, Romania	Czech Republic	1–0	2–0	2006 FIFA World Cup qualification
17	3 September 2005	Stadionul Farul, Constanța, Romania	Czech Republic	2–0	2–0	2006 FIFA World Cup qualification
18	8 October 2005	Helsinki Olympic Stadium, Helsinki, Finland	Finland	1–0	1–0	2006 FIFA World Cup qualification
19	16 August 2006	Stadionul Farul, Constanța, Romania	Cyprus	2–0	2–0	Friendly
20	6 September 2006	Qemal Stafa Stadium, Tirana, Albania	Albania	2–0	2–0	UEFA Euro 2008 qualifying
21	7 October 2006	Stadionul Steaua, Bucharest, Romania	Belarus	1–0	3–1	UEFA Euro 2008 qualifying
22	7 February 2007	Stadionul Național, Bucharest, Romania	Moldova	2–0	2–0	Friendly
23	28 March 2007	Stadionul Ceahlăul, Piatra Neamț, Romania	Luxembourg	1–0	3–0	UEFA Euro 2008 qualifying
24	6 June 2007	Stadionul Dan Păltinișanu, Timișoara, Romania	Slovenia	1–0	2–0	UEFA Euro 2008 qualifying
25	22 August 2007	Stadionul Național, Bucharest, Romania	Turkey	2–0	2–0	Friendly
26	8 September 2007	Dinamo Stadium, Minsk, Belarus	Belarus	1–0	3–1	UEFA Euro 2008 qualifying
27	8 September 2007	Dinamo Stadium, Minsk, Belarus	Belarus	3–1	3–1	UEFA Euro 2008 qualifying
28	31 May 2008	Stadionul Național, Bucharest, Romania	Montenegro	1–0	4–0	Friendly
29	13 June 2008	Letzigrund, Zürich, Switzerland	Italy	1–0	1–1	UEFA Euro 2008
30	29 March 2011	Stadionul Ceahlăul, Piatra Neamț, Romania	Luxembourg	1–1	3–1	UEFA Euro 2012 qualifying
31	29 March 2011	Stadionul Ceahlăul, Piatra Neamț, Romania	Luxembourg	2–1	3–1	UEFA Euro 2012 qualifying
32	3 June 2011	Stadionul Giulești, Bucharest, Romania	Bosnia and Herzegovina	1–0	3–0	UEFA Euro 2012 qualifying
33	7 October 2011	Arena Națională, Bucharest, Romania	Belarus	1–0	2–2	UEFA Euro 2012 qualifying
34	7 October 2011	Arena Națională, Bucharest, Romania	Belarus	2–1	2–2	UEFA Euro 2012 qualifying
35	22 March 2013	Ferenc Puskás Stadium, Budapest, Hungary	Hungary	1–1	2–2	2014 FIFA World Cup qualification

== Managerial statistics ==
As of 17 March 2025

Team	From	To	Record							
Team	From	To	G	W	D	L	GF	GA	GD	Win %
(Romania) Voluntari	15 April 2018	14 June 2018	11	4	3	4	14	14	+0	36.36
Romania U21	14 January 2020	16 April 2021	7	3	3	1	10	5	+5	42.86
(Romania) FC U Craiova	29 May 2021	5 October 2021	12	3	3	6	9	13	−4	25.00
(Romania) Rapid București	2 March 2022	7 July 2023	54	27	12	15	87	56	+31	50.00
(Azerbaijan) Neftchi Baku	11 July 2023	24 December 2023	23	10	5	8	29	24	+5	43.48
(Romania) CFR Cluj	24 January 2024	3 April 2024	11	5	3	3	19	14	+5	45.45
(Romania) Petrolul Ploiești	31 December 2024	17 March 2025	10	2	3	5	6	10	−4	20.00
Total			127	53	32	42	174	137	+37	41.73

== Honours ==
=== Player ===
Dinamo București

- Divizia A: 1999–2000
- Cupa României: 1999–2000

Inter Milan

- Coppa Italia runner-up: 1999–2000

Juventus

- Serie A: 2004–05, 2005–06 (both revoked due to the Calciopoli scandal)
- Supercoppa Italiana runner-up: 2005

Individual

- Romanian Footballer of the Year: 2003, 2005, 2007, 2008
- Guerin d'Oro: 2007
- Coppa Italia top scorer: 2009–10
- Fiorentina All-time XI
- ACF Fiorentina Hall of Fame: 2024

Records

- The second player to score in European competitions with seven different teams.

=== Manager ===
- Gazeta Sporturilor Romania Coach of the Month: April 2022

== See also ==
- List of Serie A players with 100 or more goals
- List of foreign Serie A players
