= Ludovic Guerriero =

French footballer (born 1985)

Personal information
- Date of birth: 5 January 1985 (age 41)
- Place of birth: Forbach, France
- Height: 1.77 m (5 ft 10 in)
- Position: Midfielder

Team information
- Current team: SO Merlebach

Youth career
- Nancy

Senior career*
Years	Team	Apps	(Gls)
2003–2008	Nancy	10	(0)
2005–2006	→ Raon-l'Étape (loan)	33	(6)
2008–2010	Ajaccio	68	(5)
2010–2012	Metz	69	(3)
2012–2014	Châteauroux	61	(0)
2014–2015	Laval	21	(0)
2016	Petrolul Ploiești	12	(0)
2016–2017	Pau	18	(1)
2018–2019	Sarreguemines	15	(1)
Total		307	(16)
- * Club domestic league appearances and goals

Ludovic Guerriero (born 5 January 1985) is a French former professional footballer who played as a midfielder.

== Career ==
Guerriero was born in Forbach, Moselle. He signed his first professional contract with French Ligue 1 club AS Nancy in 2003, but only appeared in two league matches in his first two seasons. At age 20, he was loaned to Championnat National club US Raon-l'Étape for the 2005–06 season. Guerriero played in 33 matches, scoring six goals for Raon-l'Étape, before returning to AS Nancy.

Following the 2007–08 season, Guerriero moved to Ligue 2 club AC Ajaccio on a three-year contract. He was AC Ajaccio's fourth signing of the summer and is expected to be a versatile player either in central or lateral defense. Guerriero expressed confidence that he could help the club gain promotion to Ligue 1.

In the summer 2019, Guerriero joined SO Merlebach.
