= Sanaa Altama =

Footballer (born 1990)

Personal information
- Date of birth: 23 July 1990 (age 36)
- Place of birth: Lille, France
- Height: 1.81 m (5 ft 11 in)
- Position: Defensive midfielder

Youth career
- RC Lille Bois Blancs
- IC Lambersart
- 2005–2008: Lille

Senior career*
Years	Team	Apps	(Gls)
2008–2010	Lille B	40	(1)
2010–2013	Dijon	24	(0)
2013–2014	Mouscron-Péruwelz	15	(1)
2015	Oțelul Galați	5	(0)
2015	Petrolul Ploiești	3	(0)
2016	CS Sedan	7	(1)
2016–2017	LB Châteauroux	6	(0)
2017–2018	LB Châteauroux II	8	(0)
2018	RWDM		
2019	IC Lambersart		

International career
2015–2016	Chad	2	(0)
- * Club domestic league appearances and goals

Sanaa Altama (born 23 July 1990) is a former professional footballer who played as a defensive midfielder. Born in France, he represented Chad at international level.

== Career ==
Born in Lille, Altama began his career with hometown club Lille. He did not make a professional appearance for the senior team, but did play on the club's reserve team in the Championnat de France Amateur, making over 40 appearances over two seasons before joining Dijon in 2010. In June 2010, Altama signed a professional contract with Dijon. He made his professional debut on 19 October 2010 in a 4–0 victory over Vannes.

Altama joined RWDM in the beginning of September 2018, but left the club again at the end of 2018.
