= Romain Inez =

French former professional footballer (born 1988)

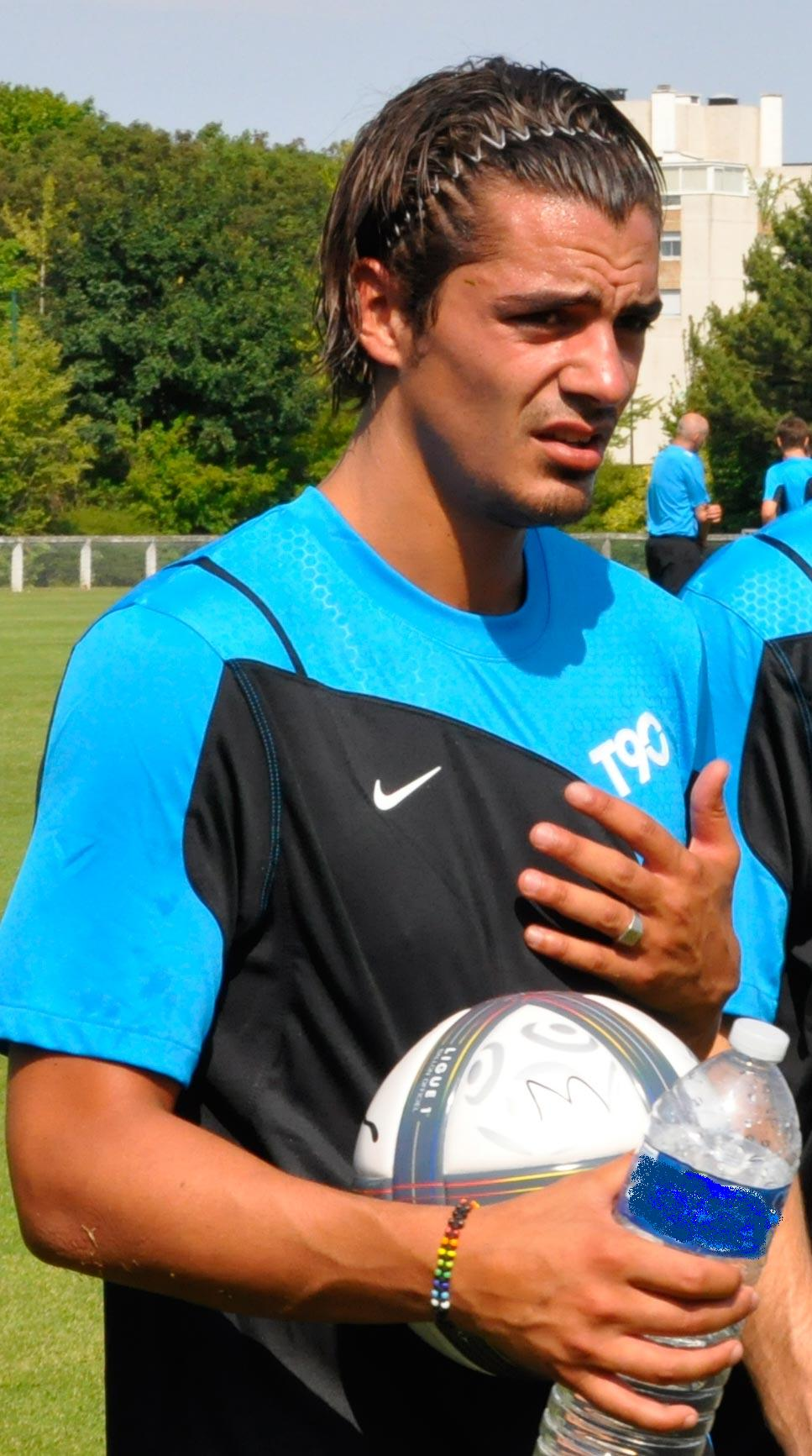

Personal information
- Date of birth: April 30, 1988 (age 38)
- Place of birth: Caen, France
- Height: 1.83 m (6 ft 0 in)
- Position: Defender

Senior career*
Years	Team	Apps	(Gls)
2007–2011	Caen	25	(0)
2008–2009	→ Cherbourg (loan)	18	(0)
2010–2011	Caen B	8	(0)
2011–2012	Châteauroux	16	(0)
2012–2014	Metz	43	(0)
2014–2015	Botev Plovdiv	10	(0)
2016	Petrolul Ploiești	4	(0)
2016–2017	Seraing	14	(0)
Total		138	(0)
- * Club domestic league appearances and goals as of 7 April 2019

Romain Inez (born April 30, 1988) is a French former professional footballer who last played as a defender for Seraing.

== Career ==
Inez began his career at Caen where he made 5 Ligue 2 and 20 Ligue 1 appearances. Whilst at Caen he spent time out on loan at Cherbourg during 2008–2009 season. Inez made his first team debut for Caen in a 2–1 away win over SC Bastia on 14 August 2009, playing full 90 minutes. He made his Ligue 1 debut on 15 August 2010 in a game against Olympique Lyonnais.

In 2012, Inez moved to Metz, where he helped the team gain promotion to the Ligue 2 a year later. In the following season he was dropped to the bench, making only nine starts in his second campaign at Stade Saint-Symphorien.

=== Botev Plovdiv ===
On 9 September 2014, Inez signed as a free agent with Bulgarian side Botev Plovdiv on a two-year deal.

Inez made a debut in A Grupa on 20 September. He came on as a 34-minute substitute to replace the injured Plamen Nikolov during the 1–1 draw with Marek Dupnitza. Three days later, on 23 September, he was in the starting lineup for the 0–4 away win against Lokomotiv Mezdra in the first round of the Bulgarian Cup. At the end of the same week, on 27 September, he was included in the starting lineup again for the 2–0 win in the derby game versus Lokomotiv Plovdiv. This was his debut in front of the extraordinary Botev Plovdiv crowd at their home stadium.

Inez did not play in any official games in 2015 due to an injury. On 24 April his contract with Botev Plovdiv was terminated.

== Career statistics ==
=== Club ===
As of 3 August 2017

Club	Season	League			National Cup		League Cup		Europe		Total	
Club	Season	Division	Apps	Goals	Apps	Goals	Apps	Goals	Apps	Goals	Apps	Goals
Cherbourg	2008–09	CFA	18	0	0	0	0	0	—		18	0
Caen	2009–10	Ligue 2	5	0	0	0	0	0	—		5	0
Caen	2010–11	Ligue 1	20	0	1	0	1	0	—		22	0
Caen	Total		25	0	1	0	1	0	—		27	0
Châteauroux	2011–12	Ligue 2	16	0	0	0	1	0	—		17	0
Metz	2012–13	Championnat National	28	0	1	0	2	0	—		31	0
Metz	2013–14	Ligue 2	15	0	1	0	1	0	—		17	0
Metz	Total		43	0	2	0	3	0	—		48	0
Botev Plovdiv	2014–15	A Group	10	0	3	0	—		—		13	0
FC Petrolul Ploieşti	2015–16	Liga I	4	0	0	0	0	0	—		4	0
Seraing	2016–17	Belgian First Amateur Division	14	0	0	0	—		—		14	0
Career total			130	0	6	0	5	0	—		141	0
