= Constantin Mișelăricu =

Romanian footballer

Constantin Mişelăricu
Personal information
- Full name: Constantin Mişelăricu
- Date of birth: 25 September 1989 (age 37)
- Place of birth: Tulcea, Romania
- Height: 1.87 m (6 ft 2 in)
- Position: Defender

Youth career
- 2000–2007: Farul Constanța

Senior career*
Years	Team	Apps	(Gls)
2006–2011	Delta Tulcea	66	(2)
2009	→Gloria II Bistriţa (loan)	4	(0)
2011–2015	Oțelul Galați	31	(1)
2011–2012	→Săgeata Năvodari (loan)	25	(1)
2012–2013	→Delta Tulcea (loan)	20	(1)
2015	Viitorul Constanța	1	(0)
2016	Petrolul Ploiești	16	(0)
- * Club domestic league appearances and goals as of 11 July 2016

Constantin Mişelăricu (born 25 September 1989) is a Romanian professional footballer who plays as a defender.
