= Fernando Velasco (footballer) =

Spanish footballer

Personal information
- Full name: Fernando Velasco Salazar
- Date of birth: 8 January 1985 (age 41)
- Place of birth: Córdoba, Spain
- Height: 1.79 m (5 ft 10 in)
- Position: Midfielder

Team information
- Current team: Marbella FC (youth coach)

Youth career
- UD Marbella

Senior career*
Years	Team	Apps	(Gls)
2003–2004	Marbella	7	(0)
2004–2005	Estepona	9	(4)
2005–2007	Fuengirola	59	(16)
2007–2009	Lucena	69	(14)
2009–2011	Cádiz	37	(7)
2010	→ Ceuta (loan)	15	(1)
2011–2013	Melilla	63	(13)
2013–2015	Leganés	66	(12)
2015	Petrolul Ploiești	5	(1)
2016–2017	Fuenlabrada	38	(5)
2017–2019	El Ejido	44	(9)
2019–2020	Europa	10	(0)
- * Club domestic league appearances and goals as of 29 February 2020

Fernando Velasco Salazar (born 8 January 1985) is a Spanish former professional footballer who played as a midfielder.

He made 31 appearances and scored four goals in the Segunda División for Cádiz and Leganés, but spent most of his career in Segunda División B, playing 317 games and scoring 57 goals for eight clubs.

== Football career ==
Born in Córdoba, Andalusia, Velasco began his career in the lower leagues, playing in Segunda División B with UD Marbella and Lucena CF. In June 2009, after scoring seven goals for the latter, he signed for Cádiz CF.

Velasco made his professional debut on 30 August 2009 as the Segunda División season began with a 1–0 loss at home to UD Salamanca; he was a 64th-minute substitute for Enrique Ortiz. Having added only four more games – one in the Copa del Rey – he was loaned back to the third tier with AD Ceuta.

After spending the 2010–11 season back at Cádiz in the third division, Velasco returned to North Africa, this time joining UD Melilla. On 1 November 2012, he scored the only goal from a penalty kick at home to La Liga team Levante UD in the last 32 of the cup; the Valencians advanced with a 4–1 win in the second leg.

In July 2013, Velasco joined CD Leganés again in the third tier. He scored twice on 11 September in a 5–1 home win over former club Lucena in the second round of the cup, and on 12 January 2014 he scored a hat-trick in a 4–0 league win over SD Amorebieta. After winning promotion, he scored four goals in the second division, starting with the only one of a win over Real Betis at the Estadio Municipal de Butarque on 19 October.

After a brief spell in the Romanian Liga I with FC Petrolul Ploiești – scoring once off the bench to equalise in a 1–1 draw at home to SSU Politehnica Timișoara – Velasco returned to his country's third tier and the Community of Madrid, signing for CF Fuenlabrada in January 2016. Eighteen months later, he moved to CD El Ejido in the same division. Following their relegation in 2019, he moved to Europa F.C. in the Gibraltar Premier Division, taking part in his first European campaign by reaching the first qualifying round of the UEFA Europa League against Legia Warsaw.

=== Later career ===
Velasco retired as footballer in 2020, and started his own player agency.

Ahead of the 2023-24 season, Velasco started coaching at the academy of Marbella FC.
