= Patrick N'Koyi =

Congolese-Dutch footballer

Personal information
- Full name: Patrick N'Koyi-Kiabu
- Date of birth: 1 January 1990 (age 36)
- Place of birth: Kinshasa, Zaire
- Position: Forward

Team information
- Current team: KSK Hasselt
- Number: 25

Senior career*
| Years | Team | Apps | (Gls) |
| 2008–2012 | FC Eindhoven | 62 | (20) |
| 2012–2014 | Fortuna Sittard | 63 | (28) |
| 2014–2015 | Petrolul Ploiești | 17 | (1) |
| 2015–2016 | Rapid București | 23 | (2) |
| 2016–2017 | MVV Maastricht | 22 | (8) |
| 2017 | Sukhothai | 0 | (0) |
| 2017 | Dundee United | 8 | (0) |
| 2018–2019 | TOP Oss | 6 | (0) |
| 2019 | Grindavík | 8 | (1) |
| 2019– | KSK Hasselt | | |
- * Club domestic league appearances and goals as of 00:07, 29 January 2020 (UTC)

Patrick N'Koyi-Kiabu (born 1 January 1990) is a Congolese-Dutch professional footballer who plays as a forward for KSK Hasselt.

He formerly played for FC Eindhoven, Fortuna Sittard, Petrolul Ploiești, Rapid București, and MVV Maastricht, Sukhothai and Dundee United.

== Early and personal life ==
Born in Kinshasa, DR Congo, N'Koyi moved to the Netherlands with his family at the age of 4.

== Career ==
N'Koyi has played club football in the Netherlands for FC Eindhoven and Fortuna Sittard. In January 2014, he and his teammate Gevaro Nepomuceno had signed pre-contracts with Liga I club Petrolul Ploiești, as they entered their last six months of their spells at Fortuna. They joined Petrolul at the start of the 2014–15 season. He then moved to Rapid București in August 2015, leaving the club at the end of the 2015–16 season. He returned to the Netherlands with MVV Maastricht in July 2016, before signing for Thai club Sukhothai in June 2017. However, shortly after joining the club, N'Koyi moved on, subsequently signing with Scottish Championship side Dundee United on 30 June 2017.

N'Koyi's time with United was short lived, with the striker leaving the club in December 2017. He made 14 appearances in all competitions, with the majority coming as a substitute. He managed to score 3 goals during his time at United, all of which came in the Scottish Challenge Cup.

After a spell with TOP Oss, he signed for Icelandic club Grindavík in January 2019. In the summer 2019, he moved to Belgian club KSK Hasselt.

== Career statistics ==
As of 23 December 2017

Appearances and goals by club, season and competition
| Club | Season | League | | | National Cup | | League Cup | | Other | | Total | |
| Club | Season | Division | Apps | Goals | Apps | Goals | Apps | Goals | Apps | Goals | Apps | Goals |
|---|---|---|---|---|---|---|---|---|---|---|---|---|
| FC Eindhoven | 2008–09 | Eerste Divisie | 4 | 0 | 0 | 0 | — | | 0 | 0 | 4 | 0 |
| FC Eindhoven | 2009–10 | Eerste Divisie | 28 | 12 | 0 | 0 | — | | 4 (Note: Appearances in the Eerste Divisie promotion play-offs) | 2 | 32 | 14 |
| FC Eindhoven | 2010–11 | Eerste Divisie | 22 | 4 | 2 | 1 | — | | 0 | 0 | 24 | 5 |
| FC Eindhoven | 2011–12 | Eerste Divisie | 3 | 1 | 0 | 0 | — | | 2 | 0 | 5 | 1 |
| FC Eindhoven | Total | | 57 | 17 | 2 | 1 | — | | 6 | 2 | 65 | 20 |
| Fortuna Sittard | 2012–13 | Eerste Divisie | 29 | 15 | 1 | 0 | — | | 2 | 0 | 32 | 15 |
| Fortuna Sittard | 2013–14 | Eerste Divisie | 30 | 13 | 1 | 0 | — | | 2 | 0 | 33 | 13 |
| Fortuna Sittard | Total | | 59 | 28 | 2 | 0 | — | | 4 | 0 | 65 | 28 |
| Petrolul Ploieşti | 2014–15 | Liga I | 17 | 1 | 2 | 1 | 1 | 0 | 3 (Note: Appearances in the Europa League) | 0 | 23 | 2 |
| Rapid București | 2015–16 | Liga II | 23 | 2 | 0 | 0 | 0 | 0 | 0 | 0 | 23 | 2 |
| MVV | 2016–17 | Eerste Divisie | 22 | 8 | 0 | 0 | — | | 4 | 0 | 26 | 8 |
| Dundee United | 2017–18 | Scottish Championship | 8 | 0 | 0 | 0 | 2 | 0 | 4 (Note: Appearances in the Scottish Challenge Cup) | 3 | 14 | 3 |
| Career total | | | 186 | 56 | 6 | 2 | 3 | 0 | 21 | 5 | 216 | 63 |
