= Alexandru Chiriță =

Romanian footballer (born 1996)

Personal information
- Full name: Alexandru Cătălin Chiriță
- Date of birth: 24 June 1996 (age 30)
- Place of birth: Ploiești, Romania
- Height: 1.78 m (5 ft 10 in)
- Positions: Attacking midfielder; winger

Youth career
- 2009–2010: Viitorul Constanța

Senior career*
Years	Team	Apps	(Gls)
2010–2011	AFC Filipeștii de Pădure		
2012–2013	CS Ștefănești		
2013	Ajaccio	0	(0)
2014	Dinamo II București	7	(1)
2014–2016	Petrolul Ploiești	8	(0)
2016–2017	CFR Cluj	7	(0)
2018	Sepsi OSK	1	(0)
2020	Petrolul Ploiești	0	(0)
Total		23	(1)
- * Club domestic league appearances and goals as of 11 May 2018

Alexandru Cătălin Chiriță (born 24 June 1996) is a Romanian professional footballer who plays as an attacking midfielder. He played in Liga I for Petrolul Ploiești, CFR Cluj and Sepsi OSK Sfântu Gheorghe.

== Personal life ==
His father, Daniel Chiriță, was also a football player. They played together at AFC Filipeștii de Pădure and CS Ștefănești.
