= Kristijan Ipša =

Croatian footballer

Personal information
- Full name: Kristijan Ipša
- Date of birth: 4 April 1986 (age 40)
- Place of birth: Poreč, SR Croatia; SFR Yugoslavia
- Height: 1.86 m (6 ft 1 in)
- Position: Centre-back

Youth career
- Funtana
- Jadran Poreč
- 2000–2004: Varteks

Senior career*
Years	Team	Apps	(Gls)
2004–2007	Varteks	63	(6)
2007–2008	Energie Cottbus	4	(0)
2008–2013	Midtjylland	89	(2)
2013–2014	Reggina	28	(0)
2014–2015	Petrolul Ploiești	21	(1)
2016	Piast Gliwice	4	(0)

International career
2002	Croatia U16	8	(1)
2002–2003	Croatia U17	6	(1)
2003–2005	Croatia U19	20	(0)
2006–2007	Croatia U20	5	(0)
2005–2008	Croatia U21	16	(0)
- * Club domestic league appearances and goals

Kristijan Ipša (born 4 April 1986) is a Croatian former professional footballer who played as a central defender. He is a former Croatian youth international.

== Club career ==
Born in Poreč, Ipša started his professional career in the youth ranks of NK Varteks. He became a regular in the Varteks squad in 2004 at just 18 years of age. His stellar defensive play was noticed and in the summer of 2007 he made a move to FC Energie Cottbus, thought to be worth around 500 thousand Euros. In January 2016 he signed half-year contract with Piast Gliwice with option of extending for one more year.

== International career ==
Ipša has represented the youth ranks of the Croatia national team at the U17, U19 and U21 levels, and has been capped a total of 41 times, scoring two goals. He was a regular at the Croatia national under-21 team.
