= Daniel Stana =

Romanian footballer

Personal information
- Full name: Ionel Daniel Stana
- Date of birth: 2 December 1982 (age 43)
- Place of birth: Craiova, Romania
- Height: 1.72 m (5 ft 7 1/2 in)
- Position: Left midfielder

Youth career
- 1997–1999: Nicolae Dobrin Football Academy

Senior career*
Years	Team	Apps	(Gls)
1999–2000	Internațional	1	(0)
2001–2002	Rocar București	13	(1)
2003–2006	Minerul Motru	49	(4)
2006–2009	Petrolul Ploiești	72	(2)
2009–2010	Chimia Brazi	25	(4)
2010–2011	CS Otopeni	24	(0)
2011–2014	Ceahlăul Piatra Neamț	76	(10)
2014	CFR Cluj	0	(0)
2014	Săgeata Năvodari	13	(0)
2015	Ceahlăul Piatra Neamț	14	(2)
2016	Petrolul Ploiești	8	(0)
2016–2017	Râmnicu Vâlcea	16	(0)
2017	Pandurii Târgu Jiu	13	(0)
- * Club domestic league appearances and goals as of 5 June 2017

Ionel Daniel Stana (born 2 December 1982) is a Romanian professional footballer who plays as a left midfielder.
