= Marian Marin =

Romanian footballer

Personal information
- Full name: Marian Ionuț Marin
- Date of birth: 11 September 1987 (age 39)
- Place of birth: Galați, Romania
- Height: 1.88 m (6 ft 2 in)
- Position: Centre back

Team information
- Current team: Ozana Târgu Neamț
- Number: 3

Senior career*
Years	Team	Apps	(Gls)
2000–2008	Petrotub Roman	80	(20)
2008–2012	Dunărea Galați	45	(1)
2014–2015	Fortuna Poiana Câmpina	15	(0)
2015	Petrolul Ploiești	3	(0)
2015	Concordia Chiajna	3	(0)
2016	→ Brașov (loan)	14	(0)
2016–2017	Academica Clinceni	28	(3)
2017–2018	Roman		
2018	Bradu Borca		
2019–	Ozana Târgu Neamț	3	(0)
- * Club domestic league appearances and goals as of 27 January 2019

Marian Ionuț Marin (born 11 September 1987) is a Romanian footballer who plays as a central defender for Ozana Târgu Neamț in the Liga III. In his career Marin also played for teams such as: CSM Roman, Dunărea Galați, Petrolul Ploiești, FC Brașov or Academica Clinceni, among others.
