= Roberto Alecsandru =

Romanian footballer

Personal information
- Full name: Roberto Mihail Alecsandru
- Date of birth: 13 September 1996 (age 30)
- Place of birth: Vălenii de Munte, Romania
- Position: Centre back

Team information
- Current team: Plopeni
- Number: 4

Youth career
- –2014: Petrolul Ploiești

Senior career*
Years	Team	Apps	(Gls)
2014–2016	Petrolul Ploiești	5	(0)
2016–2017	Juventus București	1	(0)
2017	Petrolul Ploiești	3	(0)
2017–2018	Sportul Snagov	0	(0)
2018	Urban Titu	3	(1)
2018	Agricola Borcea	0	(0)
2021–	Plopeni	93	(13)
- * Club domestic league appearances and goals as of 19:01, 27 December 2024 (UTC)

Roberto Mihail Alecsandru (born 13 September 1996) is a Romanian footballer who plays as a central defender for Romania club CSO Plopeni. He was promoted to the first team of Petrolul Ploiești in March 2014.
