= Gevaro Nepomuceno =

Curaçaoan footballer

Personal information
- Full name: Gevaro Giomar Magno Nepomuceno
- Date of birth: 10 November 1992 (age 34)
- Place of birth: Willemstad, Curaçao
- Height: 1.75 m (5 ft 9 in)
- Position: Winger

Team information
- Current team: Bentleigh Greens
- Number: 92

Youth career
- NOAD
- RKC Waalwijk
- –2010: Willem II
- 2010–2011: FC Den Bosch

Senior career*
Years	Team	Apps	(Gls)
2011–2012	FC Den Bosch	15	(1)
2012–2014	Fortuna Sittard	55	(7)
2014–2015	Petrolul Ploiești	47	(2)
2016–2017	Marítimo	12	(0)
2017	→ Famalicão (loan)	13	(0)
2017–2020	Oldham Athletic	83	(9)
2019	→ Chesterfield (loan)	15	(1)
2020–2021	FC Halifax Town	13	(1)
2021	Dinamo București	10	(0)
2021	Cherno More	7	(0)
2023	Melbourne Knights	26	(5)
2024–	Bentleigh Greens	26	(3)

International career^{‡}
2014–2023	Curaçao	52	(8)
- * Club domestic league appearances and goals as of 17 August 2024 ‡ National team caps and goals as of 13 June 2023

Gevaro Giomar Magno Nepomuceno (born 10 November 1992) is a Curaçaoan professional footballer who plays as a winger for Bentleigh Greens and the Curaçao national team.

== Club career ==
Born in Willemstad, Curaçao and raised in the Netherlands, Nepomuceno started playing football when he was 12 years old, with his friends. In the next two years, it became "something important", as he said. After playing for multiple clubs in the Netherlands, Nepomuceno joined Romanian side Petrolul Ploiești during the summer of 2014, at the age of 21. The manager who brought him, Cosmin Contra, revealed that they were initially scouting Patrick N'Koyi, the centre forward who was also transferred by Petrolul from the same team, Fortuna Sittard. He made his debut in a UEFA Europa League qualifying phase match against Flamurtari Vlorë of Albania, also scoring for an eventual 2–0 win at home. On 9 April 2015, in the Romanian League, Nepomuceno netted a late winning goal against defending champions Steaua București.

On 5 September 2017, Nepomuceno signed a one-year contract, with an option for a further year, with League One side Oldham Athletic. He was released by the Oldham club in July 2020 and signed for National League side FC Halifax Town on 3 October 2020. On 2 January 2021, Nepomuceno was released by FC Halifax Town following the end of his short-term contract.

In January 2021, he signed a six-months contract with an option for two further years with Romanian club Dinamo București.

In January 2023, he signed with Australian semi-pro outfit Melbourne Knights.

== International career ==
In September 2014, Nepomuceno was called up for the first time to the senior Curaçaoan national team, to take part at the Caribbean Cup qualification campaign. He scored his first goal on the 5th, against Grenada. Curaçao won the match 2–1. On 13 November, Nepomuceno scored against Cuba, but his team lost 2–3 and eventually failed to progress to the final stage of the Caribbean Cup.

=== International stats ===
Curaçao national team
Year	Apps	Goals
2014	9	2
2015	7	0
2016	6	1
2017	9	1
2018	5	4
2019	10	0
2020	0	0
2021	1	0
Total	47	8

=== International goals ===
As of match played 19 November 2018. Curaçao score listed first, score column indicates score after each Nepomuceno goal.

International goals by date, venue, cap, opponent, score, result and competition
No.	Date	Venue	Cap	Opponent	Score	Result	Competition
1	5 September 2014	Juan Ramón Loubriel Stadium, Bayamón, Puerto Rico	2	Grenada	2–1	2–1	2014 Caribbean Cup qualification
2	13 November 2014	Montego Bay Sports Complex, Montego Bay, Jamaica	8	Cuba	2–2	2–3	2014 Caribbean Cup
3	7 June 2016	Ergilio Hato Stadium, Willemstad, Curaçao	20	U.S. Virgin Islands	7–0	7–0	2017 Caribbean Cup qualification
4	22 June 2017	Stade Pierre-Aliker, Fort-de-France, Martinique	26	Martinique	1–1	2–1	2017 Caribbean Cup
5	10 September 2018	Ergilio Hato Stadium, Willemstad, Curaçao	34	Grenada	6–0	10–0	2019–20 CONCACAF Nations League qualification
6	12 October 2018	IMG Academy, Bradenton, United States	35	U.S. Virgin Islands	2–0	5–0	2019–20 CONCACAF Nations League qualification
7	19 November 2018	Ergilio Hato Stadium, Willemstad, Curaçao	36	Guadeloupe	1–0	6–0	2019–20 CONCACAF Nations League qualification
8	19 November 2018	Ergilio Hato Stadium, Willemstad, Curaçao	36	Guadeloupe	3–0	6–0	2019–20 CONCACAF Nations League qualification

== Personal life ==
Nepomuceno was born in Willemstad, Curaçao. He is of Curaçaoan origin, and has one brother and two sisters.

== Career statistics ==
As of match played 20 June 2019

Appearances and goals by club, season and competition
Club	Season	League			Domestic Cup		League Cup		Other		Total	
Club	Season	Division	Apps	Goals	Apps	Goals	Apps	Goals	Apps	Goals	Apps	Goals
Den Bosch	2010–11	Eerste Divisie	2	0	0	0	~	~	0	0	2	0
Den Bosch	2011–12	Eerste Divisie	13	1	2	1	~	~	0	0	15	2
Den Bosch	Total		15	1	2	1	~	~	0	0	17	2
Fortuna Sittard	2012–13	Eerste Divisie	17	2	0	0	~	~	2 (Note: Appearances in the Eerste Divisie play-offs)	0	19	2
Fortuna Sittard	2013–14	Eerste Divisie	38	5	0	0	~	~	2	0	40	5
Fortuna Sittard	Total		55	7	0	0	~	~	4	0	59	7
Petrolul Ploieşti	2014–15	Liga I	25	1	3	0	1	0	6 (Note: Appearances in the Europa League)	1	35	2
Petrolul Ploieşti	2015–16	Liga I	22	1	1	0	0	0	0	0	23	1
Petrolul Ploieşti	Total		47	2	4	0	1	0	6	1	58	3
Marítimo	2015–16	Primeira Liga	7	0	0	0	0	0	0	0	7	0
Marítimo	2016–17	Primeira Liga	5	0	0	0	1	0	0	0	6	0
Marítimo	Total		12	0	0	0	1	0	0	0	13	0
Famalicão (loan)	2016–17	LigaPro	13	0	0	0	0	0	0	0	13	0
Famalicão (loan)	Total		13	0	0	0	0	0	0	0	13	0
Oldham Athletic	2017–18	League One	26	1	0	0	0	0	0	0	26	1
Oldham Athletic	2018-19	League Two	42	6	3	0	1	0	0	0	46	6
Oldham Athletic	2019-20	League Two	0	0	0	0	0	0	0	0	0	0
Chesterfield	2019–20	National League	6	1	2	0	—		0	0	8	1
Career total			193	17	11	1	3	0	10	1	217	19

== Honours ==
=== International ===
Curaçao

- Caribbean Cup: 2017
- King's Cup: 2019
