= Pablo de Lucas =

Spanish footballer

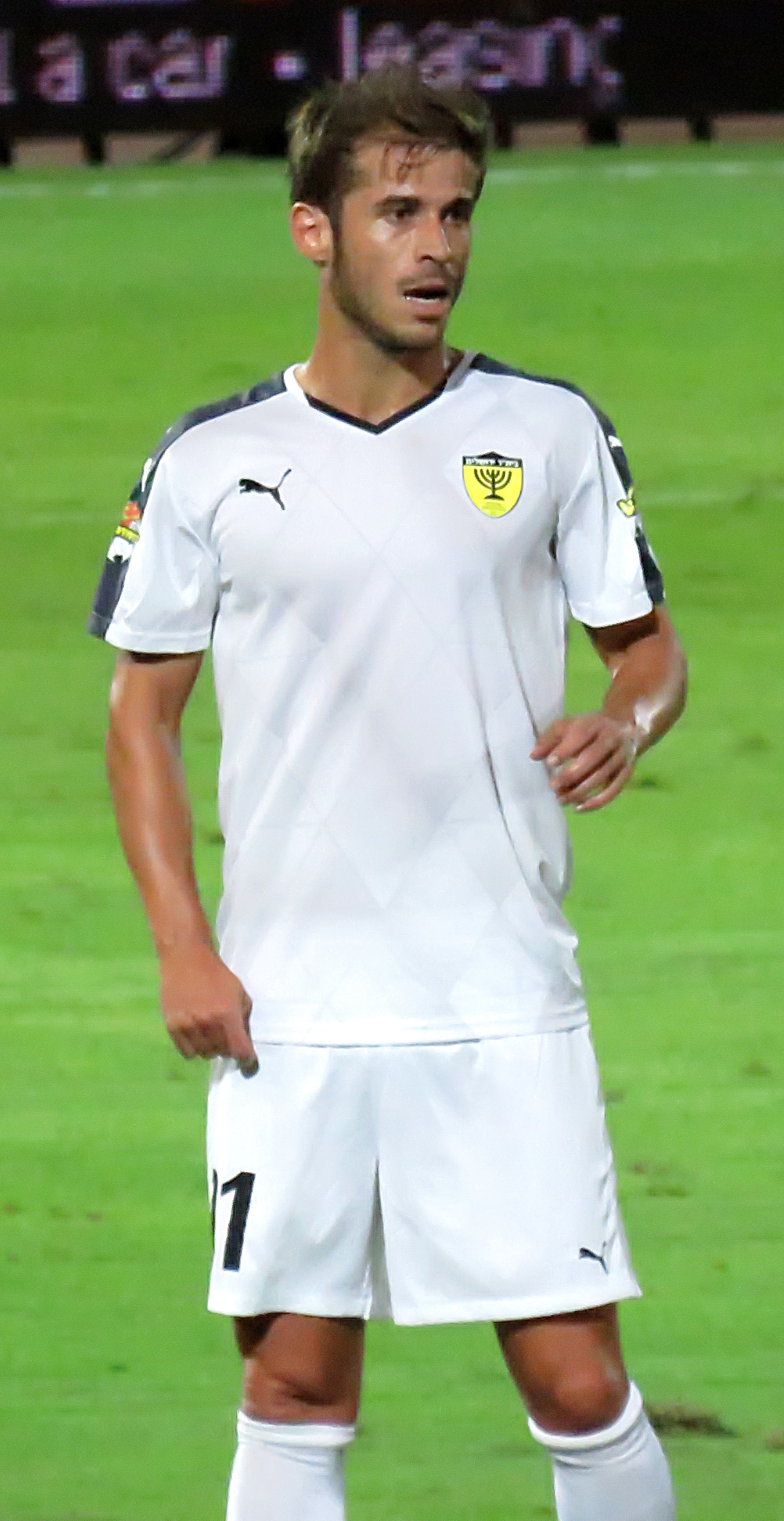
- De Lucas playing for Beitar Jerusalem in 2015

Personal information
- Full name: Pablo de Lucas Torres
- Date of birth: 20 September 1986 (age 40)
- Place of birth: Elche, Spain
- Height: 1.80 m (5 ft 11 in)
- Position: Midfielder

Youth career
- Kelme
- Sporting Gijón

Senior career*
Years	Team	Apps	(Gls)
2005–2007	Sporting Gijón B		
2005–2009	Sporting Gijón	36	(1)
2009	→ Alavés (loan)	10	(0)
2009–2010	Villajoyosa	17	(1)
2010	San Roque	12	(0)
2010–2011	Rayo Vallecano B	34	(7)
2011–2013	Salamanca	63	(6)
2013–2015	Petrolul Ploiești	53	(2)
2015–2016	Beitar Jerusalem	9	(0)
2016	Viitorul	13	(2)
2016–2020	Xanthi	69	(2)
2020–2021	Voluntari	31	(0)
2021	Argeș Pitești	4	(0)
2021–2022	Kukësi	33	(0)
2022	Brindisi	4	(0)
Total		388	(20)
- * Club domestic league appearances and goals

Pablo de Lucas Torres (Spanish pronunciation: [ˈpaβlo ðe ˈlukas ˈtores]; born 20 September 1986) is a Spanish former professional footballer who played mainly as a defensive midfielder.

== Club career ==
De Lucas was born in Elche, Province of Alicante. He was a product of Sporting de Gijón's prolific youth system, Mareo, and made his first-team debut on 4 September 2005, playing three minutes in a 4–0 away win against Gimnàstic de Tarragona; the club was then in the Segunda División.

De Lucas' first goal would come during the 2007–08 season, in a 2–1 away victory over Albacete Balompié. He contributed 12 games as the Asturians returned to La Liga after a ten-year absence.

In early January 2009, de Lucas moved on loan to Deportivo Alavés, not being able to help prevent the Basque side's relegation to Segunda División B. He moved to the same tier in September, signing with lowly Villajoyosa CF.

De Lucas spent the following years of his career in the third tier in representation of several teams, scoring on his debut for Rayo Vallecano B on 30 August 2010 from a last-minute penalty in a 1–1 draw with Universidad de Las Palmas CF. In the summer of 2013, he moved abroad for the first time, joining FC Petrolul Ploiești in Romania.

On 7 August 2014, de Lucas scored his team's third goal against FC Viktoria Plzeň, contributing to 4–1 away win in the third qualifying round of the UEFA Europa League (5–2 on aggregate). In the following years he continued abroad, representing in quick succession Beitar Jerusalem FC, FC Viitorul Constanța, Xanthi FC, FC Voluntari (two spells) and FC Argeș Pitești.
