= George Mareș =

Romanian footballer

Personal information
- Full name: George Alexandru Mareș
- Date of birth: May 16, 1996 (age 30)
- Place of birth: Bucharest, Romania
- Height: 1.80 m (5 ft 11 in)
- Position: Forward

Youth career
- 2003–2011: Steaua București

Senior career*
Years	Team	Apps	(Gls)
2012–2014	Sportul Studențesc	14	(1)
2014–2016	Petrolul Ploiești	18	(0)
2015	→ Brașov (loan)	7	(1)
2016	Dunărea Călărași	3	(0)
2016–2017	Juventus București	6	(0)

International career^{‡}
2013–2016	Romania U-19	4	(2)
- * Club domestic league appearances and goals as of 19 July 2017 ‡ National team caps and goals as of 30 April 2014

George Alexandru Mareș (born 16 May 1996 in Bucharest) is a Romanian footballer who plays as a forward. He started his senior career with Sportul Studențesc.
