= Mourad Satli =

Algerian footballer (born 1990)

Personal information
- Full name: Mourad Satli
- Date of birth: 29 January 1990 (age 36)
- Place of birth: Oran, Algeria
- Height: 1.87 m (6 ft 2 in)
- Position: Centre back

Youth career
- 2003–2006: INF Clairefontaine
- 2006–2010: Strasbourg

Senior career*
Years	Team	Apps	(Gls)
2008–2010	Strasbourg II	36	(0)
2010–2014	Charleroi	63	(1)
2010–2011	→ Boussu Dour Borinage (loan)	32	(0)
2014–2015	Petrolul Ploiești	25	(0)
2015–2016	Mechelen	4	(0)
2016–2017	NA Hussein Dey	12	(0)
2017–2019	Red Star	41	(3)
2019	Umm Salal	5	(0)
2019–2020	Muaither	0	(0)
2021	Voluntari	6	(0)
- * Club domestic league appearances and goals as of 07:07, 15 June 2021 (UTC)

Mouard Satli (Arabic: مراد ستلا; born 29 January 1990) is an Algerian professional footballer who plays as a defender.

== Club career ==
Satli was born in Oran, Algeria. At the age of 9, he started playing with a small club in Paris before joining the INF Clairefontaine academy when he was 13, spending the next three years there. In 2006, he joined RC Strasbourg.

In 2010, Satli signed a two-year contract with Belgian Pro League club Sporting Charleroi. He was immediately loaned out to second division side Boussu Dour Borinage for the 2010–2011 season., making 32 appearances for the club. In the summer of 2012, he extended his contract with Charleroi until 2014. On 28 July 2012, Satli made his Belgian Pro League debut as a starter against Mechelen in the opening round of the 2012–13 Belgian Pro League season being regular since then.

In June 2014, Satli was transferred to Petrolul Ploiești in Romania. He moved back to Belgium in August 2015, signing a one-year contract with KV Mechelen. After one year he left, and was without a club until he signed an 18 month deal with Algerian side NA Hussein Dey in December 2016.

In August 2017, Satli signed with the Parisian club Red Star FC.

In January 2019, he moved to Qatar with Umm Salal.

== Honours ==
Royal Charleroi SC

- Division II: 2011–12

Red Star FC

- Championnat National: 2017–18
