= Alexandru Radu (footballer, born 1997) =

Romanian footballer

Personal information
- Full name: Alexandru Radu
- Date of birth: May 9, 1997 (age 29)
- Place of birth: Ploiești, Romania
- Height: 1.79 m (5 ft 10 1/2 in)
- Position: Defender

Team information
- Current team: Boldești-Scăeni
- Number: 2

Youth career
- Petrolul Ploiești

Senior career*
Years	Team	Apps	(Gls)
2014–2016	Petrolul Ploiești	1	(0)
2016–2017	Luceafărul Oradea	12	(0)
2017	Petrolul Ploiești	0	(0)
2017	→ Urban Titu (loan)	5	(0)
2017–2019	Păulești	23	(3)
2019	→ Plopeni (loan)	9	(2)
2019–	Boldești-Scăeni	151	(21)
2020	→ Bradu Borca (loan)	3	(0)
2021	→ Petrolul 95 Ploiești (loan)	8	(1)
- * Club domestic league appearances and goals as of 1 November 2026

Alexandru Radu (born 9 May 1997) is a Romanian footballer who plays as a defender for Liga IV side Boldești-Scăeni. He was promoted to the first team of Petrolul Ploiești in May 2014.
