= Rodrigo Pastorini =

Uruguayan footballer (born 1990)

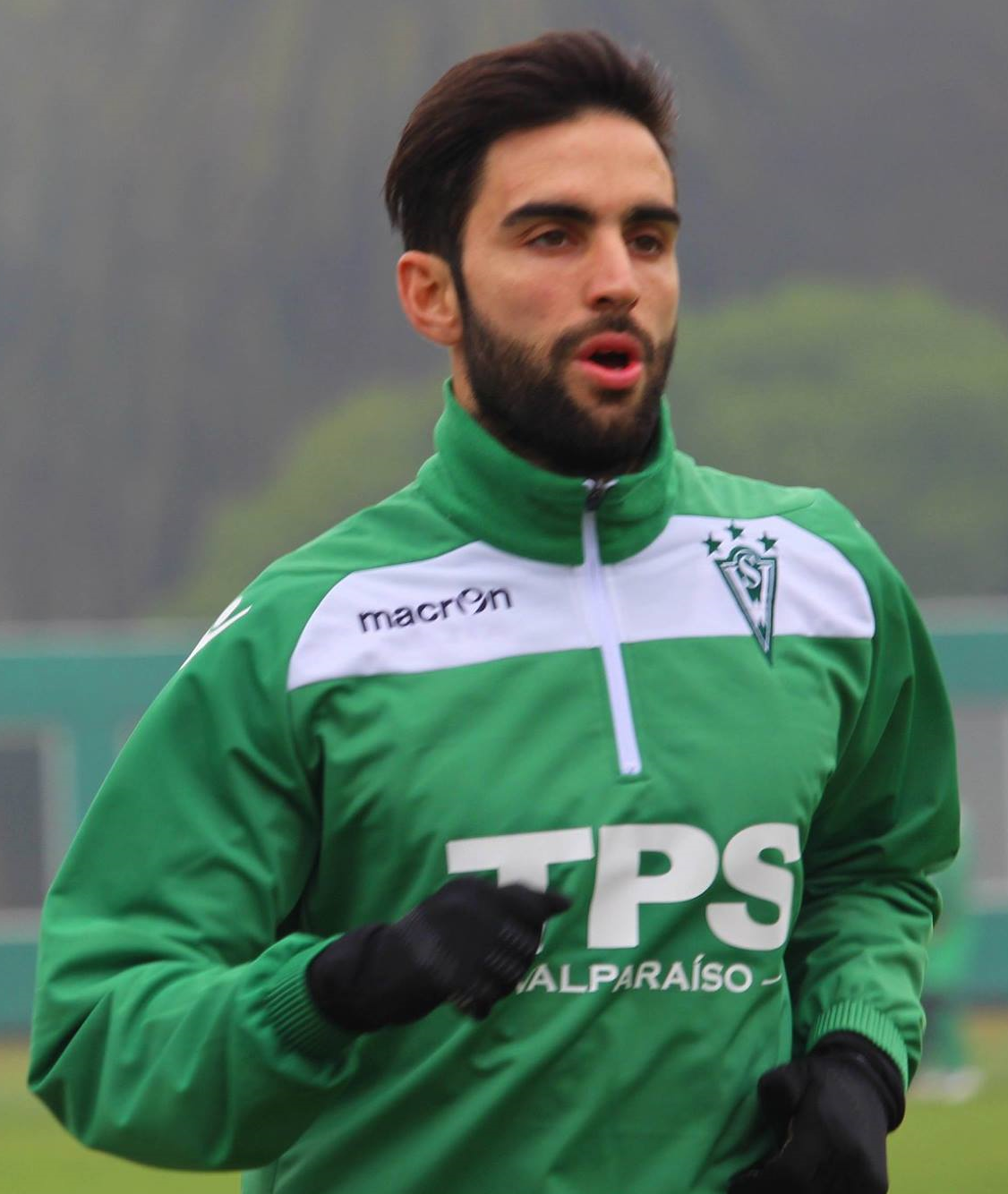

Personal information
- Full name: Rodrigo Pastorini de León
- Date of birth: 4 March 1990 (age 36)
- Place of birth: Florida, Uruguay
- Height: 1.86 m (6 ft 1 in)
- Positions: Attacking midfielder; forward

Team information
- Current team: Montevideo Wanderers
- Number: 14

Youth career
- 1996–2005: Club Atlético Florida
- 2005–2008: Danubio

Senior career*
Years	Team	Apps	(Gls)
2008–2010	Danubio	15	(0)
2011–2013	Peñarol	8	(1)
2012	→ Racing Club (loan)	13	(8)
2013–2014	Wanderers	32	(11)
2014–2015	Petrolul Ploiești	16	(0)
2015–2017	Murciélagos	20	(1)
2016–2017	→ Santiago Wanderers (loan)	13	(0)
2017–2019	Montevideo Wanderers	56	(17)
2019–2020	Nacional	4	(0)
2020	→ Montevideo Wanderers (loan)	13	(3)
2021	Hércules	8	(1)
2021	Sud América	11	(0)
2022–2023	Cantolao	34	(7)
2023	Fidelis Andria	7	(0)
2023–	Montevideo Wanderers	6	(0)

International career
2007	Uruguay U17		
- * Club domestic league appearances and goals as of 6 December 2023

Rodrigo Pastorini de León (born 4 March 1990), commonly known as Rodrigo Pastorini, is a Uruguayan footballer who plays as an attacking midfielder or forward for Montevideo Wanderers.

== Club career ==
On 31 January 2023, Pastorini signed with Fidelis Andria in the Italian third-tier Serie C.

== International career ==
Pastorini made his senior début for Uruguay at the 2007 South American Under-17 Football Championship.

== Honours ==
=== Club ===
Peñarol

- Primera División Uruguaya (1): 2012–13
- Copa Libertadores Runner-up (1): 2011

Wanderers

- Primera División Uruguaya Runner-up (1): 2013–14
