= 2013–14 FC Petrolul Ploiești season =

Petrolul Ploiești
2013–14 season
- President: Daniel Capră
- Coach: Cosmin Contra (until March 10); Răzvan Lucescu (from March 11)
- Stadium: Stadionul Ilie Oană
- Liga I: 3rd
- Cupa României: Semi-finals
- UEFA Europa League: Play-off round
- Top goalscorer: League: Juan Albín (10); All: Hamza Younés (12)
Home colours	Away colours	Third colours

The 2013–14 season was Petrolul Ploiești's 84th season in the Romanian football league system, and their third consecutive season in the Liga I.

They finished third in the 2012–13 Liga I, as well as winning the Cupa României for the third time in their history. Petrolul competed in UEFA Europa League, following an 18-year absence in European competitions. After defeating Víkingur Gøta and Vitesse Arnhem, they were eliminated in the play-off round by Swansea City. During the winter transfer window, the team brought Adrian Mutu, a former Romanian international, which attracted media attention. In January 2014, German automobile manufacturer Opel became Petrolul's shirt sponsor. In April, Petrolul had the chance to qualify for their second consecutive Cupa României final, but lost the second leg of the semi-final against rivals Astra Giurgiu (2–1), after a 0–0 result at home. The fans blamed Petrolul's administration for selling two of their best players (Hamza Younés and Damien Boudjemaa), and bringing Adrian Mutu and Ianis Zicu, who did not live up to expectations. Some also considered that the new manager, Răzvan Lucescu, wasn't a suitable replacer for Cosmin Contra, who left the club for Getafe in March. Petrolul came third in the Liga I for a second successive season, thus again participating in the UEFA Europa League second qualifying round.

== Players ==
=== Jucatori de prima echipa ===
At the end of the season.

Note: Flags indicate national team as defined under FIFA eligibility rules; some limited exceptions apply. Players may hold more than one non-FIFA nationality.

No.	Pos.	Nation	Player
1	GK	BRA	Peterson Peçanha
2	DF	HAI	Sony Alcénat
3	DF	POR	Geraldo Alves (vice-captain)
4	DF	CAF	Manassé Enza-Yamissi
5	MF	HAI	Sony Mustivar
6	DF	ROU	Dean Beța
9	MF	ESP	Walter (on loan from Lokeren)
10	FW	ROU	Adrian Mutu (captain)
11	MF	URU	Juan Albín
12	GK	ROU	Iuliu Oprea
15	MF	ROU	Ovidiu Hoban
16	FW	POR	Abel Camará (on loan from Beira-Mar)
20	MF	CMR	Njongo Priso

No.	Pos.	Nation	Player
21	DF	BRA	Guilherme Sityá
22	GK	LTU	Povilas Valinčius
23	GK	ROU	Mircea Bornescu
27	MF	ROU	Ianis Zicu
30	MF	ROU	Laurențiu Marinescu
32	DF	ROU	Sebastian Achim
35	DF	BRA	Gerson Guimarães
9	MF	BRA	Romário Pires
80	MF	POR	Filipe Teixeira
91	MF	ESP	Pablo de Lucas
93	FW	ROU	Vlad Morar
99	FW	ISR	Toto Tamuz

=== Out on loan ===
No.	Pos.	Nation	Player
—	FW	ROU	Mihai Roman (at Săgeata Năvodari)

=== Reserve players with first team appearances ===
Petrolul Ploiești's reserve team includes players from the club's academy.

No.	Pos.	Nation	Player
14	DF	ROU	Roberto Alecsandru
17	FW	ROU	Alexandru Radu

No.	Pos.	Nation	Player
18	MF	ROU	Marius Anghel

=== Jucatori cu aparente putine ===
==== In ====
No.	Pos.	Nat.	Name	Age	EU	Moving from	Type	Transfer window	Ends	Transfer fee	Source
—	RW	(France)	Mihai Roman	35	EU	Turnu Severin	Loan return	Summer	Undisclosed	Free	
42	FW	(Romania)	Adrian Cristea	29	EU	Standard Liège (Belgium)	Loan return	Summer	Undisclosed	Free	
1	GK	(Brazil)	Peterson Peçanha	33	Non-EU	Rapid București	Transfer	Summer	2015	Free	
80	MF	(Portugal) (France)	Filipe Teixeira	32	EU	Al-Shaab (United Arab Emirates)	Transfer	Summer	2014	Free	
91	MF	(Spain)	Pablo de Lucas	26	EU	Salamanca (Spain)	Transfer	Summer	2016	Free	
16	DF	(Romania)	Alexandru Benga	24	EU	Oțelul Galați	Transfer	Summer	2016	Undisclosed	
20	FW	(Cameroon) (Malta)	Njongo Priso	24	EU	CSKA Sofia (Bulgaria)	Transfer	Summer	2015	Free	
16	FW	(Portugal) (Guinea-Bissau)	Abel Camará	23	EU	Belenenses (Portugal)	Loan transfer	Summer	2014	Undisclosed	ProSport
99	FW	(Republic of the Congo)	Férébory Doré	24	Non-EU	Angers (France)	Transfer	Summer	2016	Undisclosed	
6	DF	(Romania)	Dean Beța	22	EU	Free agent	Transfer	Summer	Undisclosed	Free	
7	MF	(Spain)	Walter Fernández	23	EU	Lokeren (Belgium)	Loan transfer	Summer	2014	Undisclosed	
11	AM	(Uruguay) (Spain)	Juan Albín	26	EU	Espanyol (Spain)	Transfer	Summer	Undisclosed	Free	FC Petrolul Ploiești
10	FW	(Romania)	Adrian Mutu	35	EU	Ajaccio (France)	Transfer	Winter	Undisclosed	Free	ProSport
27	MF	(Romania)	Ianis Zicu	30	EU	Gangwon (South Korea)	Transfer	Winter	Undisclosed	Free	
12	GK	(Romania)	Iuliu Oprea	18	EU	Youth system	Promoted	Winter	Undisclosed	Free	
35	DF	(Brazil) (Spain)	Gerson Guimarães	22	EU	Kapfenberger SV (Austria)	Transfer	Winter	2017	Undisclosed	FC Petrolul Ploiești
99	FW	(Israel) (Nigeria)	Toto Tamuz	25	Non-EU	Ural Sverdlovsk Oblast (Russia)	Transfer	Winter	2016	Free	FC Petrolul Ploiești

==== Out ====
No.	Pos.	Nat.	Name	Age	EU	Moving to	Type	Transfer window	Transfer fee	Source
31	FW	(France)	Florent Sauvadet	24	EU	Free agent	Mutual termination	Summer	Free	
—	FW	(Romania)	Mihai Roman	21	EU	Săgeata Năvodari	Loan transfer	Summer	Free	
10	AM	(Brazil)	Renan Silva	24	Non-EU	Al Nahda (Oman)	Mutual termination	Summer	Free	
14	MF	(Bolivia)	Gualberto Mojica	28	Non-EU	Chongqing Lifan (China)	Transfer	Summer	Undisclosed	
18	MF	(Romania)	Marian Cristescu	25	EU	Astra Giurgiu	Mutual termination	Summer	Free	
33	GK	(Belarus)	Vasil Khamutowski	34	Non-EU	Torpedo Zhodino (Belarus)	Mutual termination	Summer	Free	
42	FW	(Romania)	Adrian Cristea	29	EU	Steaua București	Mutual termination	Summer	Free	
6	DF	(Romania)	Ionuț Neag	19	EU	Universitatea Cluj	Transfer	Summer	Undisclosed	
29	DF	(Romania)	Constantin Grecu	25	EU	Dinamo București	Mutual termination	Summer	Free	FC Petrolul Ploiești
14	DF	(Azerbaijan)	Elhad Naziri	20	Non-EU	Ravan Baku (Azerbaijan)	Mutual termination	Summer	Free	
11	FW	(Democratic Republic of the Congo) (Netherlands)	Jeremy Bokila	24	EU	Terek Grozny (Russia)	Transfer	Summer	€1.5 million	Championat
7	FW	(Romania)	Gheorghe Grozav	22	EU	Terek Grozny (Russia)	Transfer	Summer	€2.1 million	
99	FW	(Republic of the Congo)	Férébory Doré	24	Non-EU	Botev Plovdiv (Bulgaria)	Transfer	Winter	Undisclosed	
16	DF	(Romania)	Alexandru Benga	24	EU	Botev Plovdiv (Bulgaria)	Transfer	Winter	Undisclosed	
9	FW	(Tunisia)	Hamza Younés	27	Non-EU	Botev Plovdiv (Bulgaria)	Transfer	Winter	€750,000	FC Petrolul Ploiești
8	MF	(France) (Algeria)	Damien Boudjemaa	28	EU	Slavia Prague (Czech Republic)	Transfer	Winter	Undisclosed	FC Petrolul Ploiești

== Competitions ==
Win Draw Loss Postponed

=== Supercupa României ===
10 July 2013	Steaua București	3–0	Petrolul Ploiești	Bucharest
	Nikolić 21'; Bourceanu (penalty missed) 29'; Szukała 32'; Pintilii 41'	Report		Stadium: Arena Națională; Attendance: 29,459; Referee: Ovidiu Haţegan (Romania)

=== Liga I ===
==== League table ====
Pos	Team	Pld	W	D	L	GF	GA	GD	Pts	Qualification or relegation
1	Steaua București (C)	34	22	11	1	71	20	+51	77	Qualification to Champions League second qualifying round
2	Astra Giurgiu	34	22	6	6	70	28	+42	72	Qualification to Europa League third qualifying round
3	Petrolul Ploiești	34	18	14	2	53	20	+33	68	Qualification to Europa League second qualifying round
4	Dinamo București	34	17	8	9	52	34	+18	59	(Note: Vaslui did not receive a license for financial reasons. Dinamo București filed for insolvency, thus didn't get an UEFA licence. CFR Cluj got their Europa League spot.)
5	CFR Cluj	34	13	12	9	44	33	+11	51	Qualification to Europa League second qualifying round

Source: Liga I (in Romanian)
Rules for classification: 1) points; 2) goal difference; 3) number of goals scored.
(C) Champions

==== Results summary ====
Overall								Home						Away					
Pld	W	D	L	GF	GA	GD	Pts	W	D	L	GF	GA	GD	W	D	L	GF	GA	GD
34	18	14	2	53	20	+33	68	10	7	0	31	7	+24	8	7	2	22	13	+9

Last updated: 20 May 2014.
Source: fcpetrolul.ro

==== Results by opponent ====
Team	Results		Points
Team	Home	Away	Points
Astra Giurgiu	1–1	2–1	4
Botoșani	3–0	2–1	6
Brașov	0–0	1–1	2
Ceahlăul Piatra Neamț	1–1	0–0	2
CFR Cluj	3–2	1–1	4
Concordia Chiajna	2–0	0–0	4
Corona Brașov	3–0	3–0	6
Dinamo București	2–2	1–1	2
Gaz Metan Mediaș	2–0	0–1	3
Oțelul Galați	2–0	2–1	6
Pandurii Târgu Jiu	1–1	1–0	4
Poli Timișoara	0–0	3–0	4
Săgeata Năvodari	3–0	3–2	6
Steaua București	0–0	1–1	2
Universitatea Cluj	2–0	1–0	6
Vaslui	3–0	1–1	4
Viitorul Constanța	3–0	0–2	3

=== Cupa României ===
25 September 2013 Round of 32	Universitatea Craiova	0–1	Petrolul Ploiești	Stadionul Municipal, Drobeta-Turnu Severin
20:30 EEST (UTC+3)			Mustivar 18'

31 October 2013 Round of 16	Rapid București	0–2	Petrolul Ploiești	Giulești-Valentin Stănescu, Bucharest
20:30 EET (UTC+2)			Doré 66'; Romário 72'

4 December 2013 Quarter-finals	Petrolul Ploiești	4–2 (a.e.t.)	Vaslui	Ilie Oană, Ploiești
19:00 EET (UTC+2)	Fernández 37'; Hoban 90+3'; Alves 99'; Romário 103'		Celeban 27', 70'

==== Semi-finals ====
26 March 2014 First leg	Petrolul Ploiești	0–0	Astra Giurgiu	Ilie Oană, Ploiești
20:30 EET (UTC+2)		Report		Referee: Cristian Balaj (Romania)

16 April 2014 Second leg	Astra Giurgiu	2–1 (2–1 agg.)	Petrolul Ploiești	Marin Anastasovici, Giurgiu
20:30 EEST (UTC+3)	Budescu 52'; Papp 90+4'	Report	Tamuz 22'	Referee: Cristian Balaj (Romania)

Last updated: 17 April 2014
Source: FRF

=== UEFA Europa League ===
==== Qualifying rounds ====
===== Second qualifying round =====
18 July 2013 First leg	Petrolul Ploiești (Romania)	3–0	(Faroe Islands) Víkingur	Ilie Oană, Ploiești
19:00 CEST (UTC+2)	Pablo 26'; Grozav 49', 68'	Report		Attendance: 9,854; Referee: Marios Panayi (Cyprus)

25 July 2013 Second leg	Víkingur (Faroe Islands)	0–4 (0–7 agg.)	(Romania) Petrolul Ploiești	Svangaskarð, Toftir
20:00 CEST (UTC+2)		Report	A. Gregersen 5' (o.g.); Younés 11', 63'; Grozav 77'	Attendance: 288; Referee: Saïd Ennjimi (France)

===== Third qualifying round =====
1 August 2013 First leg	Petrolul Ploiești (Romania)	1–1	(Netherlands) Vitesse Arnhem	Ilie Oană, Ploiești
18:00 CEST (UTC+2)	Grozav 84'	Report	Reis 52' (pen.)	Referee: Carlos del Cerro Grande (Spain)

8 August 2013 Second leg	Vitesse Arnhem (Netherlands)	1–2 (2–3 agg.)	(Romania) Petrolul Ploiești	GelreDome, Arnhem
20:00 CEST (UTC+2)	van der Heijden 72'	Report	Boudjemaa 21'; Grozav 90+5'	Referee: Ante Vučemilović-Šimunović Jr. (Croatia)

==== Play-off round ====
22 August 2013 First leg	Swansea City (England)	5–1	(Romania) Petrolul Ploiești	Liberty Stadium, Swansea
20:05 CEST (UTC+2)	Routledge 14', 25'; Michu 22'; Bony 59'; Pozuelo 70'	Report	Grozav 87'	Referee: Sergei Karasev (Russia)

29 August 2013 Second leg	Petrolul Ploiești (Romania)	2–1 (3-6 agg.)	(England) Swansea City	Ilie Oană, Ploiești
19:30 CEST (UTC+2)	Priso 73'; Younés 83'	Report	Lamah 74'	Referee: Michael Koukoulakis (Greece)

== Pre-season and friendlies ==
22 June 2013 Friendly	Petrolul Ploiești (Romania)	2–2	(Croatia) Lokomotiva Zagreb

25 June 2013 Friendly	Petrolul Ploiești (Romania)	0–1	(Croatia) Hajduk Split

27 June 2013 Friendly	Maribor (Slovenia)	1–1	(Romania) Petrolul Ploiești	Ljudski vrt, Maribor
20:00 CET	Mezga 36' (pen.)		Bokila 62' (pen.)	Attendance: 600; Referee: Bojan Tkalčič (Slovenia)

30 June 2013 Friendly	Petrolul Ploiești (Romania)	0–1	(Serbia) Partizan Belgrad

2 July 2013 Friendly	Petrolul Ploiești (Romania)	4–1	(Bulgaria) Ludogorets Razgrad

4 July 2013 Friendly	Petrolul Ploiești (Romania)	0–0	(Ukraine) Zorya Luhansk

6 September 2013 Friendly	Ludogorets Razgrad (Bulgaria)	Match interrupted	(Romania) Petrolul Ploiești	Ludogorets Arena, Razgrad

11 October 2013 Friendly	Getafe (Spain)	1–1	(Romania) Petrolul Ploiești	Coliseum Alfonso Pérez, Getafe

14 November 2013 Friendly	Hellas Verona (Italy)	1–1	(Romania) Petrolul Ploiești	Stadio Marc'Antonio Bentegodi, Verona

23 January 2014 Friendly	Sturm Graz (Austria)	1–1	(Romania) Petrolul Ploiești	Antalya Province, Turkey
	Beichler 43' (pen.)	Report	Manassé 32'

26 January 2014 Friendly	Anzhi Makhachkala (Russia)	2–1	(Romania) Petrolul Ploiești	Antalya Province, Turkey
	Asildarov 85' (pen.); Serderov 88'	Report	Zicu 10'

29 January 2014 Friendly	FK Jagodina (Serbia)	0–1	(Romania) Petrolul Ploiești	Antalya Province, Turkey
		Report	Morar 10'

6 February 2014 Friendly	Chornomorets Odesa (Ukraine)	1–0	(Romania) Petrolul Ploiești	Antalya Province, Turkey
	Antonov 59' (pen.)	Report

9 February 2014 Friendly	Sheriff Tiraspol (Moldova)	2–2	(Romania) Petrolul Ploiești	Antalya Province, Turkey
	Luvannor 30', 74'	Report	Mutu 3', 19'

11 February 2014 Friendly	Kuban Krasnodar (Russia)	0–1	(Romania) Petrolul Ploiești	Antalya Province, Turkey
		Report	Mutu 81'

14 February 2014 Friendly	Terek Grozny (Russia)	2–1	(Romania) Petrolul Ploiești	Antalya Province, Turkey
	Maurício 69'; Komorowski 87'	Report	Albín 77'

Last updated: 15 February 2014

== See also ==
- 2013–14 Cupa României
- 2013–14 Liga I
- 2013–14 UEFA Europa League
