= 2013 Cupa României final =

- Event: 2012–13 Cupa României
Petrolul Ploiești	CFR Cluj
1	0
- Date: 1 June 2013
- Venue: Arena Națională, Bucharest
- Man of the Match: Jeremy Bokila
- Referee: Cristian Balaj
- Attendance: 29,343

The Cupa României final was the final match of the 2012–13 Cupa României, played between Petrolul Ploiești and CFR Cluj. The match was played on 1 June 2013 at the Arena Națională in Bucharest. Petrolul Ploiești won the match 1–0, triumphing for the 3rd time in this competition while CFR Cluj lost its first final. It was the second final played on the Arena Națională and the second in Bucharest since 2006. Jeremy Bokila scored the only goal of the match in the 8th minute and was named Man of the Match. Winners Petrolul Ploiești will face Romanian Champions, on the same stadium on 10 July in the Romanian Supercup.

== Route to the final ==
Petrolul Ploiești

Round of 32	Petrolul Ploiești	2 – 0	Damila Măciuca
Round of 16	Brașov	0 – 2	Petrolul Ploiești
Quarter-finals	Petrolul Ploiești	2 – 1	Concordia Chiajna
Semifinals 1st Leg	Oțelul Galați	0 – 3	Petrolul Ploiești
Semifinals 2nd Leg	Petrolul Ploiești	1 – 2 agg.: 4 – 2	Oțelul Galați

CFR Cluj

Round of 32	Berceni	0 – 2	CFR Cluj
Round of 16	CFR Cluj	2 – 0	Botoșani
Quarter-finals	CFR Cluj	2 – 1	Dinamo București
Semifinals 1st Leg	CFR Cluj	0 – 0	Astra Giurgiu
Semifinals 2nd Leg	Astra Giurgiu	0 – 2 agg.: 0 – 2	CFR Cluj

== Match ==
1 June 2013
20:45 EEST

Petrolul Ploiești	1–0	CFR Cluj
Bokila 8'	Report

Arena Națională, Bucharest
Attendance: 29,343
Referee: Cristian Balaj (Romania)

Petrolul:
GK	33	(Belarus) Vasil Khamutowski
RB	2	(Haiti) Jean Sony Alcénat
CB	15	(Romania) Ovidiu Hoban
CB	4	(Central African Republic) Manassé Enza-Yamissi
LB	21	(Brazil) Guilherme Sitya
MF	20	(France) Sony Mustivar
MF	14	(Bolivia) Gualberto Mojica	(substituted off) 83'
CM	8	(France) (Algeria) Damien Boudjemaa	(substituted off) 92'
FW	9	(Tunisia) Hamza Younés
FW	11	(Democratic Republic of the Congo) Jeremy Bokila
FW	7	(Romania) Gheorghe Grozav	(substituted off) 72'
Substitutes:
RB	32	(Romania) Sebastian Achim	(substituted on) 92'
CM	52	(Brazil) Romário Pires	(substituted on) 83'
FW	93	(Romania) Vlad Morar	(substituted on) 72'
Manager:
(Romania) Cosmin Contra

CFR:
GK	1	(Portugal) Mário Felgueiras
RB	3	(Portugal) Ivo Pinto
CB	20	(Portugal) Cadú
CB	13	(Italy) Felice Piccolo
LB	45	(Portugal) Camora
RW	30	(Portugal) Rui Pedro
DM	6	(Romania) Gabriel Mureșan
DM	5	(Ivory Coast) Bakary Saré
LW	10	(Portugal) Diogo Valente	(substituted off) 61'
FW	7	(Romania) Ciprian Deac	(substituted off) 81'
FW	24	(France) Robert Maah
Substitutes:
FW	9	(Greece) Pantelis Kapetanos	(substituted on) 61'
FW	11	(Brazil) Weldon	(substituted on) 81'
Manager:
(Romania) Eugen Trică

MAN OF THE MATCH

- (Democratic Republic of the Congo) Jeremy Bokila (Petrolul)

MATCH OFFICIALS

- Assistant referees:
  - Aurel Onița
  - Valentin Avram
- Fourth official:
  - George Rădulescu
- Additional assistant referees:
  - Istvan Kovacs
  - Alexandru Tudor

MATCH RULES

- 90 minutes.
- 30 minutes of extra-time if necessary.
- Penalty shoot-out if scores still level.
- Seven named substitutes.
- Maximum of three substitutions.
