= 2026–27 FC Petrolul Ploiești season =

FC Petrolul Ploiești
2026–27 season
- Manager: Ricardo Sousa
- Stadium: Ilie Oană Stadium
- Superliga: 7th
- Cupa României: Pre-season

The 2026–27 season is the 102nd year in the history of FC Petrolul Ploiești and the club's fifth consecutive season in Liga I. The club will also compete in the Cupa României.

== Transfers ==
=== In ===
Pos.	Player	Transferred from	Fee	Date	Source
MF	(Costa Rica) Alejandro Bran	(Costa Rica) Alajuelense		1 July 2026	
DF	(Azerbaijan) Cəlal Hüseynov	(Bulgaria) Arda Kardzhali	Free	1 July 2026	
FW	(Portugal) Rodrigo Martins	(Portugal) Lusitânia de Lourosa		1 July 2026	
FW	(Portugal) Léo Teixeira	(Portugal) Felgueiras		1 July 2026	
DF	(Romania) Mark Țuțu	(Romania) Ceahlăul Piatra Neamț	Free	1 July 2026	
MF	(Argentina) Lucho Vega	(Portugal) União de Leiria	Free	1 July 2026	
DF	(Netherlands) Adam Zaian	(Netherlands) MVV Maastricht	Free	1 July 2026	
GK	(Czech Republic) Lukáš Zima	(Romania) FCSB	Free	1 July 2026	
FW	(England) Dan Nlundulu	(Scotland) St Mirren	Free	9 July 2026	

=== Out ===
Pos.	Player	Transferred to	Fee	Date	Source
MF	(Finland) Tommi Jyry	(Finland) Kuopion Palloseura		1 July 2026	
DF	(Portugal) Ricardinho	(Portugal) Lusitânia de Lourosa		1 July 2026	
DF	(Benin) Yohan Roche			1 July 2026	
FW	(Kazakhstan) Abat Aymbetov		End of contract	1 July 2026	
MF	(Cameroon) Danel Dongmo	(Portugal) Nacional	Contract terminated	1 July 2026	

== Pre-season and friendlies ==
27 June 2026 Friendly	Lechia Gdańsk (Poland)	0–5	(Romania) Petrolul Ploiești	Poland
11:30			Papp 10'; Tolea 13'; Leescu 55'; Parashiv 66'; Israel 73'

30 June 2026 Friendly	Olimpia Grudziądz (Poland)	4–1	(Romania) Petrolul Ploiești	Poland
14:00	4'; 15'; 25'; 41'		Bran 14'

2 July 2026 Friendly	Chojniczanka Chojnice (Poland)	1–4	(Romania) Petrolul Ploiești	Poland
17:00	16'		21'; 38'; 77', 86'

3 July 2026 Friendly	Arka Gdynia (Poland)	2–0	(Romania) Petrolul Ploiești	Poland
14:00	12'; 90+1'

10 July 2026 Friendly	Petrolul Ploiești (Romania)	1–1	(Romania) ASA Târgu Mureș
11:30

11 July 2026 Friendly	Petrolul Ploiești (Romania)	2–2	(Romania) Chindia Târgoviște
19:30

== Competitions ==
=== Superliga ===
==== Regular season ====
Pos	Team	Pld	W	D	L	GF	GA	GD	Pts	Qualification
5	Oțelul Galați	1	1	0	0	2	1	+1	3	Advances to Play-off
6	Rapid București	1	1	0	0	1	0	+1	3	Advances to Play-off
7	Petrolul Ploiești	1	1	0	0	1	0	+1	3	Advances to Play-out
8	Botoșani	1	0	1	0	2	2	0	1	Advances to Play-out
9	Voluntari	1	0	1	0	2	2	0	1	Advances to Play-out

Updated to match(es) played on 20 July, 2026. Source: LPF (in Romanian)
Rules for classification: 1) Points; 2) Head-to-head points; 3) Head-to-head goal difference; 4) Head-to-head goals scored; 5) Goal difference; 6) Goals scored; 7) Play-off.

==== Results by round ====
Round	1	2	3	4	5	6	7	8	9	10	11	12	13	14	15	16	17	18	19	20	21	22	23	24	25	26	27	28	29	30
Ground	H	A	A	H	A	H	A	H	A	H	A	H	A	H	A	A	H	H	A	H	A	H	A	H	A	H	A	H	A	H
Result	W	L																												
Position	6	7																												

Updated to match(es) played on 24 July 2026. Source:
A = Away; H = Home; W = Win; D = Draw; L = Loss

=== Matches ===
19 July 2026 1	Petrolul Ploiești	1–0	Dinamo București	Ploiești
19:30 UTC+3	Rodrigo Martins 39' (pen.)	Report		Stadium: Ilie Oană; Attendance: 7,710; Referee: George Cătălin Roman

24 July 2026 2	Argeș Pitești	1–0	Petrolul Ploiești	Mioveni
18:30 UTC+3	Moldoveanu 17'; Ricardo Matos (red card) 43'	Report		Stadium: Orășenesc; Attendance: 2,621; Referee: Horațiu Feșnic

1 August 2026 3	Universitatea Craiova	v	Petrolul Ploiești	Craiova
				Stadium: Ion Oblemenco
