= Yamissi =

Yamissi is a surname. Notable people with the surname include:

- Eloge Enza Yamissi (born 1983), Central African footballer
- Manassé Enza-Yamissi (born 1989), Central African footballer
