= Alexandru Borbely =

Romanian footballer

Personal information
- Date of birth: 27 November 1910
- Place of birth: Bucharest, Romania
- Date of death: 26 August 1987 (aged 76)
- Position: Midfielder

Youth career
- Olimpia Satu Mare

Senior career*
Years	Team	Apps	(Gls)
1928–1929	Juventus București	2	(0)
1931–1934	Belvedere București		
1934–1935	ASCAM București		
1935–1938	Craiu Iovan Craiova		
1938–1940	Metalosport București		
1940–1941	Sănătatea București		

International career
1929–1932	Romania	5	(0)
- * Club domestic league appearances and goals

Alexandru Borbely II (27 November 1910, in Romania – 26 August 1987) was a Romanian football midfielder and coach. His brother Iuliu Borbely was also a national team footballer, they played together at Juventus București, Belvedere București and ASCAM București.

== International career ==
Alexandru Borbely played five games for Romania, making his debut in a 3–0 victory against Bulgaria. Borbely played two games at the 1929–31 Balkan Cup and one game at the 1931–1934 Central European Cup for Amateurs, both tournaments being won by Romania. He was part of Romania's squad at the 1930 World Cup without playing.

== Honours ==
Romania

- Balkan Cup: 1929–31
- Central European International Cup: 1931–34
