= Juan Ángel Albín =

Uruguayan footballer (born 1986)

Juan Albín
Personal information
- Full name: Juan Ángel Albín Leites
- Date of birth: 17 July 1986 (age 40)
- Place of birth: Salto, Uruguay
- Height: 1.79 m (5 ft 10 in)
- Positions: Attacking midfielder; winger

Team information
- Current team: Municipal Grecia

Youth career
- 2000–2004: Nacional

Senior career*
Years	Team	Apps	(Gls)
2004–2006	Nacional	64	(24)
2006–2011	Getafe	116	(19)
2011–2013	Espanyol	13	(2)
2013	→ Nacional (loan)	8	(1)
2013–2014	Petrolul Ploiești	37	(15)
2015–2018	Veracruz	62	(13)
2017	→ Dinamo București (loan)	4	(0)
2018	Omonia	2	(0)
2019	Rampla Juniors	30	(7)
2020	Defensor	16	(2)
2021–2022	Rampla Juniors	44	(6)
2024–	Municipal Grecia	12	(0)

International career
2003	Uruguay U17	1	(1)
2005	Uruguay U20	3	(4)
- * Club domestic league appearances and goals as of 03:15, 29 March 2025 (UTC)

Juan Ángel Albín Leites (born 17 July 1986) is a Uruguayan professional footballer who plays as an attacking midfielder or a winger for Segunda División de Costa Rica club Municipal Grecia.

After starting out at Nacional, he spent the first part of his career in La Liga and went on acquire Spanish citizenship. He amassed league totals of 129 matches and 21 goals over seven seasons in the latter country, representing Getafe and Espanyol in the competition.

Other than Uruguay and Spain, Albín played in Romania, Mexico, Cyprus and Costa Rica.

== Club career ==
=== Nacional ===
Born in Salto, Salto Department, Albín started his career at Club Nacional de Football, where he won two Primera División championships. His strong performances earned him a transfer to Spanish club Getafe CF in the 2006 summer transfer window.

=== Getafe ===
Albín featured sparingly in his first season (13 La Liga games), but became first choice the following campaign as the Madrid outskirts team reached the quarter-finals of the UEFA Cup and a mid-table league position. After a coaching change brought Míchel to the bench, however, he began appearing less regularly; on 29 November 2008, in a rare start, he scored in a 3–1 home win over Real Madrid.

On 21 April 2009, also against Real Madrid, Albín was struck in the face by Pepe, in the mêlée which resulted after the Portuguese's aggression on Javier Casquero. He continued being used intermittently in 2010–11, netting a last-minute winner at home against Villarreal CF on 11 December 2010 but also being sent off for lifting his shirt, in a second bookable offence.

=== Espanyol ===
In mid-April 2011, Getafe agreed to sell Albín to RCD Espanyol for €3 million, as his contract was set to expire in June 2012. He spent several months of his first season on the sidelines, nursing a leg injury.

Albín scored his first goal for the Catalans on 4 February 2012, netting in the 92nd minute for a 3–3 away draw against Athletic Bilbao. In January 2013, due to lack of playing time, he was loaned to his former club Nacional.

=== Later career ===
It's true that I came here for Contra, but I've found a great group [of players] and some incredible fans. [...] I want to stay.

— Albín on 15 March 2014, a few weeks before extending his contract with Petrolul

On 6 September 2013, Albín signed a one-year contract with FC Petrolul Ploiești in Romania, rejoining his former Getafe teammate Cosmin Contra who was now a manager. He made his Liga I debut on the 21st, scoring his team's goal in a 1–1 draw at FC Dinamo București.

On 31 March 2014, Albín chose to extend his link by one year even if at that time Contra had already left. He ended the campaign with 28 matches and ten goals in all competitions.

Albín scored against GNK Dinamo Zagreb in the second leg of the Europa League play-off round, on 28 August 2014; however, his side lost 5–2 on aggregate and failed to progress to the group stage. On 16 December, as Petrolul faced financial issues which led to insolvency and ultimately bankruptcy, he was transferred to C.D. Veracruz of Mexico.

Albín returned to Romania and its top division nearly three years later, joining Dinamo București on a season-long loan with an option to buy. On 18 July 2018, the 32-year-old joined Cypriot First Division club AC Omonia.

== International career ==
Albín represented Uruguay at under-17 and under-20 levels. In March 2009, he was called to the full side by Óscar Tabárez ahead of a 2010 FIFA World Cup qualifier against Paraguay, but remained unused in the 2–0 victory and never won a cap.

== Style of play ==
Albín was a left-footed attacking midfielder who could also be deployed as a winger. He was described as a footballer with "great speed and a very good technique".

During his first stint in Romania, Albín was known as an excellent free kick taker, and in 2016 former international Adrian Mutu went as far to state that he was the best foreigner that the league ever had.

== Honours ==
Nacional

- Uruguayan Primera División: 2005, 2005–06

Getafe

- Copa del Rey runner-up: 2006–07, 2007–08

Veracruz

- Copa MX: Clausura 2016
