= Iuliu Oprea =

Romanian footballer

Personal information
- Full name: Iuliu Oprea
- Date of birth: July 2, 1995 (age 31)
- Place of birth: Ploiești, Romania
- Height: 1.82 m (5 ft 11 1/2 in)
- Position: Goalkeeper

Team information
- Current team: Constructorul Leova
- Number: 95

Senior career*
Years	Team	Apps	(Gls)
2014–2015	Petrolul Ploiești	1	(0)
2015–2017	Petrolistul Boldești	19	(0)
2017–2022	Petrolul 95 Ploiești	162	(0)
2022–2025	CSO Boldești-Scăeni	82	(0)
2026–	Constructorul Leova	19	(0)
- * Club domestic league appearances and goals as of 2 May 2026

Iuliu Oprea (born 2 July 1995 in Ploiești) is a Romanian footballer who plays as a goalkeeper. He was promoted to the first team in January 2014.
