= Dan Nlundulu =

French-born English footballer (born 1999)

Personal information
- Full name: Dan Nlundulu
- Date of birth: 5 February 1999 (age 27)
- Place of birth: Villiers-le-Bel, France
- Height: 1.85 m (6 ft 1 in)
- Position: Forward

Team information
- Current team: Petrolul Ploiești
- Number: 9

Youth career
- –2013: Chelsea
- 2013–2020: Southampton

Senior career*
Years	Team	Apps	(Gls)
2020–2023	Southampton	13	(0)
2021–2022	→ Lincoln City (loan)	16	(1)
2022	→ Cheltenham Town (loan)	4	(1)
2022–2023	→ Cheltenham Town (loan)	23	(4)
2023	→ Bolton Wanderers (loan)	13	(1)
2023–2025	Bolton Wanderers	21	(1)
2024–2025	→ Cambridge United (loan)	25	(4)
2025–2026	St Mirren	27	(3)
2026–	Petrolul Ploiești	13	(3)

International career
2014	England U16	2	(1)
- * Club domestic league appearances and goals as of 06:05, 11 November 2026 (UTC)

Dan Nlundulu (born 5 February 1999) is a professional footballer who plays as a forward for Liga I club Petrolul Ploiești. Born in France, he has represented England at youth level.

Nlundulu is a product of the Southampton academy and made his professional debut for the club in October 2020. He had loan spells with Lincoln City, Cheltenham Town and Bolton Wanderers before joining the latter club permanently in June 2023. Nlundulu spent the 2024–25 season on loan with Cambridge United. In September 2025, he moved to St Mirren where he won the Scottish League Cup. Nlundulu joined Romanian club Petrolul Ploiești in July 2026.

== Club career ==
=== Southampton ===
Nlundulu signed a two-year contract extension in September 2019. He made his first match day squad appearance as an unused substitute against Manchester United on 31 August 2019. On 25 October 2020, Nlundulu made his senior debut as a substitute in Southampton's 2–0 home league victory against Everton. On 19 January 2021, Nlundulu scored his first goal in Southampton's 2–0 victory over Shrewsbury Town in the FA Cup.

==== Lincoln City (loan) ====
On 14 July 2021, he signed a new three-year contract at Southampton, before being immediately loaned out to Lincoln City on a season-long loan. He made his debut for the Imps on 17 August, coming off the bench against Bolton Wanderers. He scored his first goal for the club against Wigan Athletic on 26 October 2021. On 6 January 2022, Southampton recalled Nlundulu from his loan spell.

==== Cheltenham Town (loan) ====
On 6 January 2022, he joined Cheltenham Town on loan until the end of the season. Nlundulu made his debut for the club on 8 January 2022 in a 1–1 draw with Burton Albion. On 15 January 2022, he scored his first goal for the club in a 1–1 draw with Charlton Athletic. On 4 July 2022, Nlundulu rejoined Cheltenham Town until 8 January 2023.

=== Bolton Wanderers ===
On 9 January 2023, Nlundulu joined Bolton Wanderers on a loan deal until the end of the season. He made his debut for the club on 14 January 2023 in a 3–0 victory against Portsmouth. On 7 May 2023, Nlundulu scored his first goal for the club in a 3–2 away victory against Bristol Rovers. He was cup-tied as Bolton went on to win the 2022–23 EFL Trophy.

On 24 June 2023, Nlundulu signed permanently for Bolton on a three-year contract for an undisclosed fee. It was reported upon signing that Bolton paid a six figure sum for him with later reports in February 2024 stating they paid £250,000.

==== Cambridge United (loan) ====
On 30 August 2024, Nlundulu joined Cambridge United on a season-long loan. He made his debut for the club on 3 September 2024 in a 3–3 draw with Bromley in the EFL Trophy, but lost 5–4 on penalties. On 17 September 2024, Nlundulu scored his first goal for the club in a 2–1 home defeat against Charlton Athletic in the EFL Trophy. During a 1–0 home defeat against Bristol Rovers on 4 January 2025, he suffered a hamstring injury and was expected to be sidelined for eight to ten weeks.

=== St Mirren ===
On 1 September 2025, it was announced that Nlundulu had agreed a one-year contract with Scottish Premier League side St Mirren. He played in the 2025 Scottish League Cup final on 14 December against Celtic, which St Mirren won 3–1 to secure the League Cup.

=== Petrolul Ploiești ===
On 9 July 2026, Nlundulu joined Liga I side Petrolul Ploiești.

== International career ==
Born in France, Nlundulu is of Congolese descent. He moved to England at a young age with his family, when his brother Gaël joined local rivals Portsmouth in 2008 from PSG. He is a youth international for England.

== Career statistics ==
As of match played 6 November 2026

Appearances and goals by club, season and competition
Club	Season	League			National Cup (Note: Includes FA Cup, Scottish Cup, Cupa României)		League Cup (Note: Includes EFL Cup, Scottish League Cup)		Other		Total	
Club	Season	Division	Apps	Goals	Apps	Goals	Apps	Goals	Apps	Goals	Apps	Goals
Southampton U21s	2016–17 EFL Trophy		—		—		—		1 (Note: Appearances in the EFL Trophy)	0	1	0
Southampton U21s	2019–20 EFL Trophy		—		—		—		2	1	2	1
Southampton U21s	2020–21 EFL Trophy		—		—		—		1	0	1	0
Southampton U21s	Total		—		—		—		4	1	4	1
Southampton	2019–20	Premier League	0	0	0	0	0	0	—		0	0
Southampton	2020–21	Premier League	12	0	3	1	0	0	—		15	1
Southampton	Total		12	0	3	1	0	0	—		15	1
Lincoln City (loan)	2021–22	League One	16	1	2	0	0	0	3	0	21	1
Cheltenham Town (loan)	2021–22	League One	4	1	—		—		—		4	1
Cheltenham Town (loan)	2022–23	League One	23	4	1	0	0	0	3	1	27	5
Bolton Wanderers (loan)	2022–23	League One	13	1	—		—		2 (Note: Appearances in the League One play-offs)	0	15	1
Bolton Wanderers	2023–24	League One	21	1	2	2	1	0	4	2	28	5
Bolton Wanderers	2024–25	League One	0	0	—		0	0	—		0	0
Bolton Wanderers	Total		21	1	2	2	1	0	4	2	28	5
Cambridge United (loan)	2024–25	League One	25	4	2	0	—		3	1	30	5
St Mirren	2025–26	Scottish Premiership	27	3	2	1	3	1	1 (Note: Appearance in Scottish Premiership promotion/relegation play-offs)	0	33	5
Petrolul Ploiești	2026–27	Liga I	13	3	2	0	—		—		15	3
Career total			154	18	14	4	4	1	20	5	192	28

== Honours ==
St Mirren

- Scottish League Cup: 2025–26
