= Iuliu Borbely =

Romanian footballer

Personal information
- Date of birth: 1909
- Place of birth: Satu Mare, Romania
- Position: Midfielder

Youth career
- Olimpia Satu Mare

Senior career*
Years	Team	Apps	(Gls)
1928–1929	Juventus București	2	(0)
1931–1934	Belvedere București		
1934–1935	ASCAM București		
1935–1939	CA Oradea (Note: The statistics for the 1938–39 Divizia B season are available.)	36	(5)

International career
1929–1931	Romania	3	(0)
- * Club domestic league appearances and goals

Iuliu Borbely I (born 1909) was a Romanian football midfielder. His brother Alexandru Borbely was also a national team footballer, they played together at Juventus București, Belvedere București and ASCAM București.

== International career ==
Iuliu Borbely played three friendly games for Romania, making his debut in a 3–2 away victory against Bulgaria.
