= Israel Dele =

Nigerian footballer (born 2001)

Personal information
- Full name: Ola Israel Dele
- Date of birth: 27 October 2001 (age 25)
- Place of birth: Lagos, Nigeria
- Height: 1.78 m (5 ft 10 in)
- Position: Midfielder

Team information
- Current team: Petrolul Ploiești
- Number: 99

Youth career
- –2017: Diamonds Stars
- 2017–2019: Dominion Pacers
- 2019–2020: Liepāja Academy Nigeria
- 2020: Liepāja

Senior career*
| Years | Team | Apps | (Gls) |
| 2020–2022 | Liepāja | 9 | (0) |
| 2021 | → Daugavpils (loan) | 24 | (5) |
| 2022–2023 | Daugavpils | 33 | (3) |
| 2023–2026 | Sigma Olomouc | 26 | (2) |
| 2023–2026 | Sigma Olomouc B | 55 | (8) |
| 2025 | → SKHS Kroměříž (loan) | 6 | (0) |
| 2026– | Petrolul Ploiești | 9 | (0) |
- * Club domestic league appearances and goals as of 6 November 2026

Ola Israel Dele (born 27 October 2001) is a Nigerian professional footballer who plays as a midfielder for Liga I club Petrolul Ploiești.

== Honours ==
Liepāja

- Latvian Cup: 2020

Sigma Olomouc

- Czech Cup: 2024–25
