= Adam Zaian =

Dutch footballer (born 2003)

Personal information
- Full name: Adam Mahmoud Paul Zaian
- Date of birth: 14 June 2004 (age 22)
- Place of birth: Utrecht, Netherlands
- Height: 1.89 m (6 ft 2 in)
- Positions: Centre-back; defensive midfielder

Team information
- Current team: Petrolul Ploiești
- Number: 24

Youth career
- –2016: Zwaluwen Utrecht
- 2016–2019: Utrecht
- 2019–2021: USV Hercules
- 2021–2022: Alphense Boys
- 2022–2024: Roda JC

Senior career*
Years	Team	Apps	(Gls)
2024	Eendracht Aalst	13	(0)
2024–2025	Jong Maastricht		
2025–2026	Maastricht	19	(0)
2026–	Petrolul Ploiești	11	(0)
- * Club domestic league appearances and goals as of 6 November 2026

Adam Mahmoud Paul Zaian (Arabic: زيانآدم محمود بول; born 14 June 2004) is a Dutch professional footballer who plays as a centre-back or a defensive midfielder for Liga I club Petrolul Ploiești.

== Honours ==
Eendracht Aalst

- Belgian Division 2: 2023–24
