= Vasil Khamutowski =

Belarusian footballer (born 1978)

Personal information
- Full name: Vasil Iosifavich Khamutowski
- Date of birth: 30 August 1978 (age 48)
- Place of birth: Minsk, Belarusian SSR, Soviet Union
- Height: 1.93 m (6 ft 4 in)
- Position: Goalkeeper

Youth career
- 1994–1995: Smena Minsk
- 1996–1997: Ataka Minsk

Senior career*
Years	Team	Apps	(Gls)
1994–1995	Smena Minsk	4	(0)
1996–1997	Ataka Minsk	12	(0)
1998–2000	BATE Borisov	22	(0)
1998–1999	→ Smena Minsk (loan)	20	(0)
2000	Torpedo-MAZ Minsk	12	(0)
2000–2001	Waldhof Mannheim	2	(0)
2001–2002	Dynamo Moscow	8	(0)
2002	Volgar-Gazprom Astrakhan	5	(0)
2002–2003	Metalist Kharkiv	2	(0)
2003	→ Metalist-2 Kharkiv	3	(0)
2003–2005	FCSB	50	(0)
2006–2007	Tom Tomsk	21	(0)
2008	Carl Zeiss Jena	17	(0)
2008–2010	FC Augsburg	1	(0)
2010–2011	Tavriya Simferopol	7	(0)
2011–2012	Amkar Perm	14	(0)
2012–2013	Petrolul Ploieşti	13	(0)
2013–2014	Torpedo-BelAZ Zhodino	29	(0)
2015–2016	Dinamo Minsk	2	(0)
Total		244	(0)

International career
1998–1999	Belarus U21	5	(0)
2000–2008	Belarus	26	(0)

Managerial career
- 2016–2017: Krumkachy Minsk (caretaker)
- * Club domestic league appearances and goals

Vasil Iosifavich Khamutowski (Belarusian: Васіль Іосіфавіч Хамутоўскі, Russian: Василий Иосифович Хомутовский, Vasily Iosifovich Khomutovsky; born 30 August 1978) is a Belarusian football coach and former player who played as a goalkeeper.

== Club career ==
Khamutowski started his career in 1994 with Smena Minsk, a club from the Belarusian third division. Since 1995, he has been regularly transferring from one club to another and subsequently played for Ataka-Aura Minsk in 1996, BATE Borisov in 1998, Smena-BATE Minsk in the same year, again BATE Borisov in 1999 and then again Smena-BATE Minsk, also in 1999. In 2000, he moved to Torpedo-MAZ Minsk before transferring abroad for the first time in the summer of the same year, to German side Waldhof Mannheim, who played in the 2. Bundesliga at the time. However, he spent the entire season with the German team as the second-choice keeper and only made two league appearances.

He went on to move to Russian side Dinamo Moskva in 2001, but soon moved to Volgar GP Astrakhan for the beginning of the 2002 season. However, he only spent one half-season with the team before moving to Metalist Kharkiv for the 2002–03 season.

In the summer of 2003, he joined Romanian team FCSB on a free transfer, signing a contract until January 2007. He played three seasons for FCSB and won the Romanian league title twice. In early 2006, he left Romania and joined FC Tom Tomsk, signing a two-year contract. In 2012, he said that "The main problem of the Russians is an undeveloped infrastructure. When people come to old, gray, dilapidated stadiums, and water pours on top of them – how to drive wives and children there? This is especially characteristic of the Urals and Siberia. But clubs have solid budgets; in principle, they could quietly develop in this regard. But where finance wasted, I do not know. It's good that the situation is changing now. We would have to tighten up management, because in Russia this is a problem."

In January 2008, he joined FC Carl Zeiss Jena, a relegation-threatened side in the German Second Bundesliga, where he signed a contract until the end of the season with an automatic one-year extension in case the club managed to stay in the Second Bundesliga. He helped the team reach the semi-finals of the German Cup, where they were knocked out by Borussia Dortmund.

Following Carl Zeiss Jena's relegation to the 3. Liga, he signed a two-year contract with FC Augsburg, where he injured his shoulder. He was released on 30 June 2010.

In March 2012, he came back to Romania, signing a contract for three months with Petrolul Ploiești.

On 1 June 2013, he won the Cupa României 1–0 against CFR Cluj, playing in the final.

== International career ==
Khamutowski was capped several times for Belarus. He was part of the team in their qualifying campaigns for the UEFA Euro 2004 and 2008 as well as the 2006 FIFA World Cup, appearing in a total of 10 qualifiers for the three tournaments.

== Managerial career ==
On 1 April 2022, Khamutowski signed a contract with Steaua București. He will be the goalkeeping coach for the team's Youth Center.

== Political persecution ==
On 30 September 2022, while visiting Minsk for meniscus surgery and rehabilitation, Khamutowski was arrested in connection with his participation in 2020 Belarusian protests. On 29 December he was given two years of house arrest. He was recognezed by Viasna Human Rights Centre as a political prisoner.

== Honours ==
BATE Borisov

- Belarusian Premier League: 1999

FCSB

- Liga I: 2004–05, 2005–06

Petrolul Ploieşti

- Cupa României: 2012–13
