= Damien Boudjemaa =

French footballer of Algerian descent (born 1985)

Personal information
- Full name: Damien Boudjemaa
- Date of birth: 7 June 1985 (age 41)
- Place of birth: Paris, France
- Height: 1.73 m (5 ft 8 in)
- Position: Midfielder

Senior career*
Years	Team	Apps	(Gls)
2006–2012	UJA Alfortville	74	(19)
2012–2014	Petrolul Ploieşti	60	(7)
2014–2015	Slavia Prague	22	(1)
2016–2017	Astra Giurgiu	14	(2)
2018–2021	US Lusitanos Saint-Maur	49	(3)
2021–2022	FC 93 Bobigny	8	(2)
2022–	Montreuil FC		
- * Club domestic league appearances and goals as of 7 January 2023

Damien Boudjemaa (born 7 June 1985) is a French footballer of Algerian descent who plays as a midfielder and for Montreuil FC.

== Club career ==
In the summer of 2012, there were rumors that Rapid București would be interested to sign the player for the 2012/2013 season. He continued with Petrolul, but new rumors pointed to the interest of the Ligue 1 clubs Valenciennes and Brest to transfer the player during the 2012/2013 winter break. Boudjemaa declared that he would like to play for Petrolul in European competitions, to reward the sympathy of the fans.

In February 2014, he moved to Gambrinus liga team SK Slavia Prague for undisclosed fee. He scored in his first match for Slavia Prague, the only goal in their 1–5 loss against SK Sigma Olomouc.

In January 2016, he moved to Astra Giurgiu.

== Honours ==
Petrolul Ploieşti

- Cupa României: 2012–13
- Supercupa României runner-up: 2013

Astra Giurgiu

- Liga I: 2015–16
- Supercupa României: 2016
