= Manassé Enza-Yamissi =

Central African Republic footballer (born 1989)

Personal information
- Full name: Manassé Ruben Enza-Yamissi
- Date of birth: 28 September 1989 (age 37)
- Place of birth: Bangui, Central African Republic
- Height: 1.89 m (6 ft 2 in)
- Position: Centre back

Team information
- Current team: CA Neuville-de-Poitou

Youth career
- Auxerre

Senior career*
Years	Team	Apps	(Gls)
2006–2007	Auxerre C	4	(0)
2008–2009	Nîmes	8	(0)
2009–2010	Sochaux B	24	(0)
2010–2012	Amiens	34	(1)
2012–2014	Petrolul Ploiești	38	(0)
2014–2015	Gil Vicente	19	(0)
2015–2017	Orléans	12	(0)
2017–2018	Concordia Chiajna	14	(0)
2018–2020	Annecy	25	(2)
2020–2021	Besançon	1	(0)
2021–2022	Mulhouse	20	(0)
2022–2024	Stade Poitevin	15	(0)
2024–2025	La Rochelle		
2025–	CA Neuville-de-Poitou		

International career^{‡}
2012–2020	Central African Republic	19	(0)
- * Club domestic league appearances and goals as of 26 March 2025 ‡ National team caps and goals as of 23:49, 17 November 2020 (UTC)

Manassé Ruben Enza-Yamissi (born 28 September 1989) is a Central African professional footballer who plays as a centre back for CA Neuville-de-Poitou.

== Early life ==
Enza-Yamissi was born in Bangui in 1989. His father Robert Enza was born in Fort-Crampel, Oubangui-Chari, in 1956. His mother Nicole was born in Batalimo, Central African Republic, in 1965. He acquired French nationality on 16 November 1999, through the collective effect connected to the reinstatement of his father in French nationality and the naturalization of his mother.

== Career ==
Enza-Yamissi played on the professional level in Ligue 2 for Nîmes Olympique and in the Championnat de France amateur for the reserve team of FC Sochaux-Montbéliard.

In 2010, he joined SC Amiens with whom he gained promotion to the Ligue 2. After the team was relegated to the Championnat National, Enza-Yamissi left.

In the summer of 2012 Enza-Yamissi joined Liga I club Petrolul Ploiești. He signed a two-year contract with the Romanian side.

After his contract with Petrolul ended in the summer of 2014, he signed with Portuguese side Gil Vicente.

After suffering relegation to Segunda Liga with Gil Vicente in the 2014–15 season, Enza-Yamissi left the club and signed a two-year deal with US Orléans.

== Personal life ==
Manassé is the brother of Central African Republic national team player Eloge Enza Yamissi.

== Honours ==
Petrolul Ploieşti

- Romanian Cup: 2012–13
