= FC Petrolul Ploiești =

Association football club in Ploiești

Petrolul Ploiești
- Full name: Asociația Clubul Sportiv Petrolul 52 (Note: The legal entity that operates the club is officially named "Fotbal Club Petrolul", but commonly uses the "FC Petrolul Ploiești" trademark.)
- Nicknames: Găzarii (The Gasmen); Petroliștii (The Oilmen); Galben-albaștrii (The Yellow and Blues); Lupii galbeni (The Yellow Wolves)
- Short name: Petrolul
- Founded: 31 December 1924; 101 years ago as FC Juventus București
- Ground: Ilie Oană
- Capacity: 15,073
- Owner: Asociația Clubul Sportiv Petrolul 52
- Chairman: Claudiu Tudor
- Head coach: Ricardo Sousa
- League: Liga I
- 2025–26: Liga I, 12th of 16
- Website: fcpetrolul.ro
Home colours

Asociația Clubul Sportiv Petrolul 52, commonly known as FC Petrolul Ploiești (Romanian pronunciation: [peˈtrolul ploˈjeʃtʲ]), Petrolul Ploiești, or simply Petrolul, is a Romanian professional football club based in Ploiești, Prahova County. It competes in the Liga I, the top tier of the Romanian league system.

The team was founded in 1924 in Bucharest as Juventus, following the merger of Triumf and Romcomit, and won its first national championship in the 1929–30 season. In 1952, it relocated to the industrial city of Ploiești, and adopted the name Petrolul five years later. During this period, the club enjoyed its most successful era, securing three further league titles in 1957–58, 1958–59, and 1965–66. Petrolul Ploiești has also won the Cupa României on three occasions, most recently in the 2012–13 season.

The team made its European debut in the 1958–59 season, facing East German side Wismut Karl Marx Stadt in the preliminary round of the European Cup. Overall, it has participated in 12 European campaigns, eight of which were organised by UEFA.

Petrolul Ploiești's traditional colours are yellow and dark blue, a combination that has earned its players and supporters the nickname "the Yellow Wolves". It plays its home matches at the 15,073-seat Ilie Oană Stadium, which was inaugurated in 2011. Its principal rivalry is with Rapid București, a fixture known as the Primvs derby. The club also shared a short-lived local rivalry with Astra Giurgiu between 1998 and 2012, during the period in which Astra was based in Ploiești.

== History ==
Period	Name
1924–1947	Juventus București
1947–1948	Distribuția București
1948–1949	Petrolul București
1949–1950	Competrol București
1950–1951	Partizanul București
1951–1952	Flacăra București
1952–1956	Flacăra Ploiești
1956–1957	Energia Ploiești
1957–	Petrolul Ploiești

=== Founding and early years (1924–1952) ===
The team was founded in Bucharest in late 1924, when Romcomit and Triumf merged into what would become one of the most notable clubs of the capital during the interwar period, Juventus București. Its Latin identity was illustrated by the crest, which was based on the legend of the founding of Rome, where a she-wolf nursed Romulus and Remus. Juventus inherited the stadium and the red and blue colors of Romcomit. An article relating the event was published on 4 January 1925 in the Gazeta Sporturilor newspaper, under the title "Juventus – A sensational merger" (Juventus – O fuziune senzațională).

In their first season of existence being led by president Ettore Brunelli and player-coach Ion Motoroi, the team finished on the 4th place in the Bucharest championship, the first game taking place on 8 March 1925 in a 3–0 victory against Colțea București with goals scored by Bebe Rollea, Antofiloiu (o.g.) and Török, the team used being: Căpșuneanu – Constantin Vețianu, Sile Georgescu – Schaller, Ion Motoroi, Grigore Grigoriu, Sergiu Petrovici, Victor Block, Bebe Rollea, Török, Aurel Schei. Before the start of the new season, president Brunelli wanted to test the value of his squad, organizing the club's first matches at international level, friendlies which ended with victories against Slavia Prague (2–1), Slavia Sofia (3–0) and Vasas Budapest (5–2). In the Bucharest regional championship, the team finished on the 1st place, qualifying for the 1925–26 Divizia A where they lost the final in front of Chinezul Timișoara, being led in the first half of the season by coach Motoroi and in the second by György Hlavay who according to journalist Ioan Chirilă's book, "Zile și nopți pe stadion" (Days and nights at the stadium) is considered by Romania's coach at the 1930 World Cup, Constantin Rădulescu to be the first coach that brought modern training sessions on the fields of Bucharest.

Their first national title came six years after their establishment, being led in the first half of the season by coach Gyula Feldmann and in the second by Hlavay, as the team won another Bucharest regional championship, qualifying for the 1929–30 Divizia A where they won the final with a 3–0 victory against Gloria Arad with goals scored by László Raffinsky, Ion Maior and Carlo Melchior, the team used being: Dumitru Bacinschi – Constantin Deleanu, Sile Georgescu – Ștefan Wetzer, Emerich Vogl, Tibor Remeny – Gyula Dobo, Carlo Melchior, Rudolf Wetzer, László Raffinsky, Ion Maior. After the reorganization of the Romanian division structure, the club played seven consecutive campaigns in the Divizia A, from 1933 to 1940. Following World War II, they were promoted once again to the top tier, having finished first in the final Divizia B season prior to the outbreak of war. The club played its last campaign as Juventus in 1946–47, after which the name was changed numerous times to Distribuția, Petrolul, Competrol, Partizanul and Flacăra respectively.

=== Move to Ploiești and three national titles (1952–1968) ===
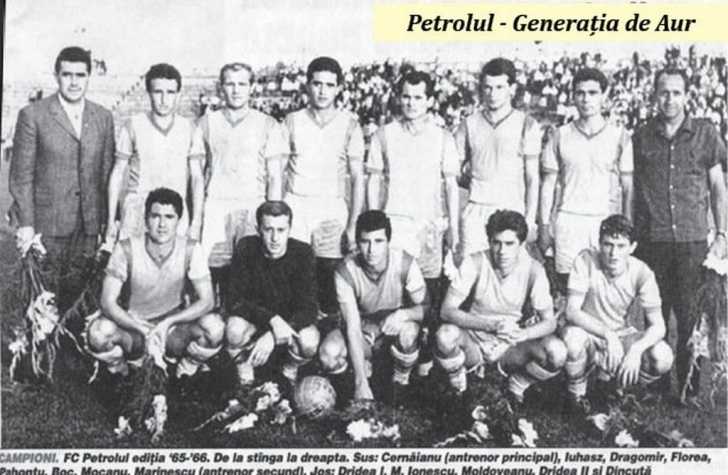
Petrolul Ploiești's 1965–66 team, also known as Generația de Aur ("The Golden Generation").

Flacăra București was moved to Ploiești in 1952, and renamed accordingly. Coach Ilie Oană took charge of the team at the half of the 1952 season, but he couldn't manage to spare his team from relegation. He would, however, reach the cup final, lost against CCA București 0–2. In 1957–58, the team became champion of Romania for the second time in its history, despite having the same number of points as CCA București and Știința Timișoara. That was also the season when the present-day name of Petrolul Ploiești was adopted.

In the autumn of 1958, Petrolul made its debut in the European Cup and faced Wismut Karl Marx Stadt of East Germany in the preliminary round. After a 4–2 away loss in Aue, the club managed to level on aggregate with a 2–0 victory in Romania. Wismut Karl Marx Stadt qualified further after winning the play-off 4–0 in Kyiv. The first part of the 1958–59 Divizia A saw Petrolul on the fourth place in the table, but with several good results which followed the team clinched its second consecutive league championship. They were once again unable to go further than the preliminary round of the European Cup, Austrian side Wiener Sport-Club defeating them 1–2 on aggregate.

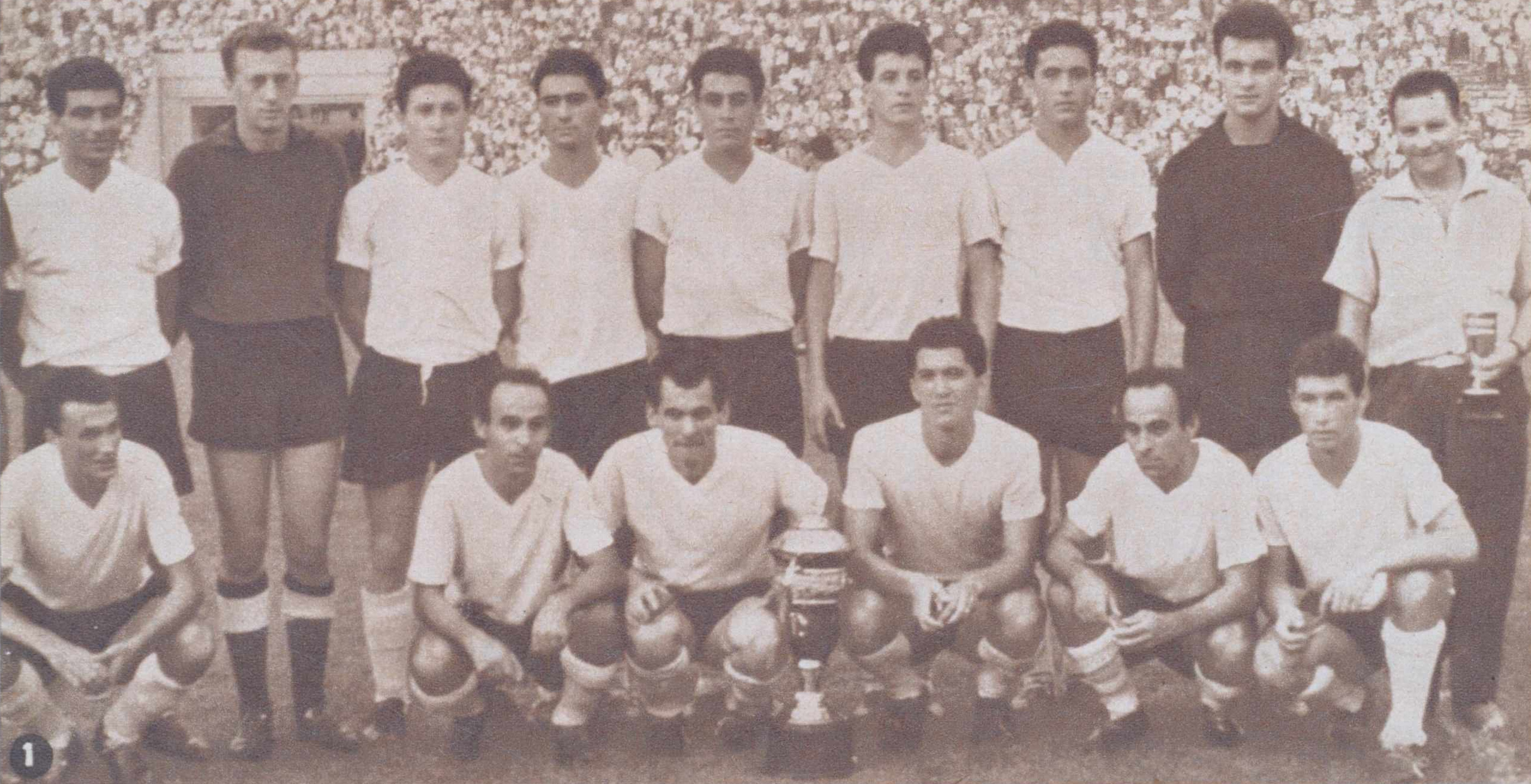
Petrolul Ploiești posing with the Cupa României trophy in 1963.

On 14 July 1963 Petrolul's player Constantin Tabarcea collapsed and died during a Divizia A match against Dinamo Bacău. One week later after his death Petrolul won the 1962–63 Cupa României with 6–1 against Siderurgistul Galați and before the game, at the team photo, the place from the down row in front of goalkeeper Mihai Ionescu was left free in the memory of Tabarcea. In 1965, head coach Ilie Oană left Petrolul for the Romania national team, and assistant Constantin Cernăianu took over the vacant place. At his first season, Cernăianu achieved the club's fourth Divizia A trophy after finishing six points ahead of Rapid București. 12 October 1966 has remained an important date in the history of the team; after a 0–2 away defeat, Petrolul won 3–1 at home against the champions of England, Liverpool. The third match in Brussels was difficult, and "the Reds" went ahead in the European Cup.

=== A period of decline (1968–1990) ===
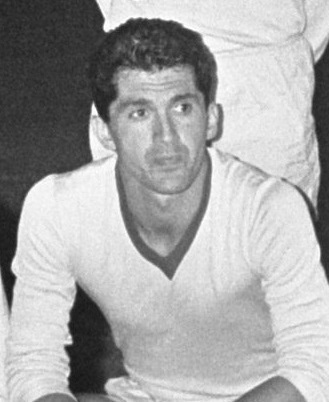
Mircea Dridea appeared in 273 league matches for Petrolul between 1956 and 1971.

After that period of great form, Petrolul began a period of decline and although the club remained in the first division for many years later, only the 1995 Romanian Cup final reminded their supporters about the years of glory. In 1970, the oilmen finished the first part of the championship on the 2nd place, but it lost that place until the end of the season. 1969–70, 1971–72 were seasons in which Petrolul was at only one step from relegation. After a "resuscitation" (1972–73, 15th place occupied after five rounds, the 4th place at the beginning of the winter break), 1973 was quite weak year. In 1974, the people from Ploiești suspected a match fixed between Argeş Pitești and CFR Cluj, in favor of the team from Cluj-Napoca, it was supposed that Petrolul officials have tried to financially stimulate the host, but the authorities discovered the plan and the team has discreetly relegated to Divizia B, this happened in the conditions in which in 1963 Prahova Ploiești and Carpați Sinaia, other two teams from Prahova County were relegated by the Romanian Football Federation to Divizia B due to match-fixing.

Arrived in the second division, the most valuable footballers of the club, Crângaşu and Rămureanu left and after 3 rounds the team was the last. The yellow wolves recovered later, but the local coaches did not have the value of Ilie Oană, who also went to Politehnica Iași, then to Universitatea Craiova, Petrolul remaining in some kind of mediocrity. In January 1976, the club brought in Valentin Stănescu to be the coach, and the team tried to promote but lost a home game against FC Brăila. After the game, the supporters showed their dissatisfaction with Dinulescu's refereeing, throwing various objects from the stands. FCM Galaţi then strengthened its nickname as an "ABBA" team (a nickname used in Romania for clubs that frequently alternated between the first and second divisions), promoting in front of Petrolul that year and relegating after only one season in the top flight of Romanian football.

Instead, Petrolul had an exceptional 1976–77 season, with 15 wins and 2 draws in the first part of the campaign, finishing in 1st place, far ahead of 2nd place Gloria Buzău. The squad included Gh. Constantin, Mîrzea, Gh. Dumitrescu, Sotir, Ene, Butufei, I. Constantin, Ionescu, Angelescu, N. Florian, Simaciu, Negoiță, D. Georgescu, Fl. Dumitrescu, Pantea, Toporan, State, Pisău, Mînăstire, and Manolache.

Unfortunately, the players born in the Prahova County did not have enough experience and at the end of the 1977–78 Divizia A season it was ranked only 17th and relegated back. The immediate promotion was forbidden by Viitorul Scorniceşti, the football club from the native town of Nicolae Ceaușescu, which was strongly pushed forward to Divizia A by the communist authorities, in power at the time, a concrete proof being that FC Olt promoted from Divizia C after an 18–0 victory against the team ranked 15th, while Flacăra Moreni won only 2–1, in a match played at the same hour, against ROVA Roșiori.

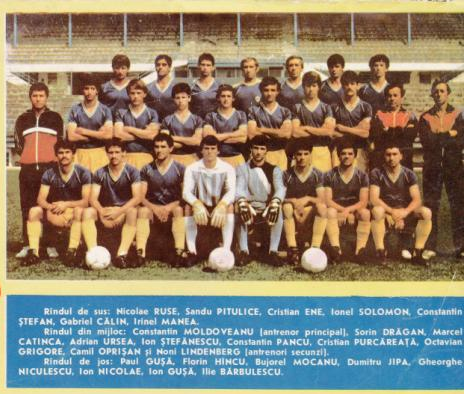
Petrolul (1988–89), the squad that ended a long period of decline with their 1989 promotion to Divizia A.

The 1979–80 season had also been disappointing for Petrolul. Rapid București and Progresul București battled for first place, while Metalul Plopeni, the kingmaker, defeated Rapid in Bucharest but lost to Progresul. In 1980, Petrolul appointed Traian Ionescu as their new coach, a highly experienced manager who had previously led clubs like Dinamo București and Fenerbahçe. However, another challenge threatened Petrolul's promotion dreams. That year, CS Târgoviște made a sensational signing: Nicolae Dobrin, nicknamed "The Gander" or "The Prince of Trivale," one of the most important figures in Romanian football, joined Târgoviște after spending 19 years in Pitești. Dobrin played a decisive role in his team's promotion, thwarting the plans of the Yellow Wolves. In 1982, after spending most of the previous eight seasons—including four consecutive years—in the second league, Petrolul finally surpassed their great rival Rapid and returned to Divizia A.

The 1982–83 Divizia A season, was a one full of emotions, avoiding the relegation was the target in the mind of everyone at each of the games played by the team. 1983–84 season send Petrolul back to Divizia B again, but promotion came after a victory at Galați against Dunărea, former FCM, the team which forbidding the promotion of the oilmen, ten years earlier. In 1987, the yellow and blues signed another coach, a former team player from years of glory, Constantin Moldoveanu. But Moldoveanu did not have in the squad the players who won against Steaua București or Liverpool in the glory times and Petrolul relegated back to the second league. September 1988 brought Ion Radu as the new chairman, helped by Mihai Cristache. The two were often criticized of the post-revolutionary press, but they did some performances like in the times of Mircea Dridea and Mihai Ionescu. Petrolul promoted in 1989 and finished on the 4th place in its first season, helped also by the dissolution (in the winter of 1990) of Victoria București, club sponsored by the Romanian Ministry of Internal Affairs (the "Miliția", Police), institution under the former Communist regime.

=== European participations and cup win (1990–2002) ===
Petrolul finished the 1989–90 Divizia A on the fourth place, after having just returned from the second division in 1989. Therefore, it qualified for the UEFA Cup along with Universitatea Craiova and Politehnica Timișoara. "The Yellow Wolves" played against Belgian club Anderlecht, which won both legs. At the end of the 1990–91 season, Petrolul finished 7th and in the Romanian Cup they were eliminated in the second round proper by their bitter rivals Steaua București.

In the summer of 1991 the club changed its name to FC Ploiești, but made a very weak season, finishing only 10th in the top flight and in the Romanian Cup, the squad was eliminated again in the second round proper, this time by FC U Craiova. At the end of the season FC Ploiești changed its name back to Petrolul Ploiești. "The Oilmen" saved from relegation in the last moment at the end of the 1992–93 season, finishing 16th out of 18, with two points over Selena Bacău and four over CSM Reșița. Next season, coach Marin Ion and his players made a very good season and finished in the top 5, more exactly on the 5th place, one point over Farul Constanța, at the same number of points with 4th place (Rapid București), two points behind 3rd place (Dinamo București) and three points behind 2nd place (FC U Craiova). In the Romanian Cup, "the Yellow Wolves" were eliminated in the second round proper by Inter Sibiu.

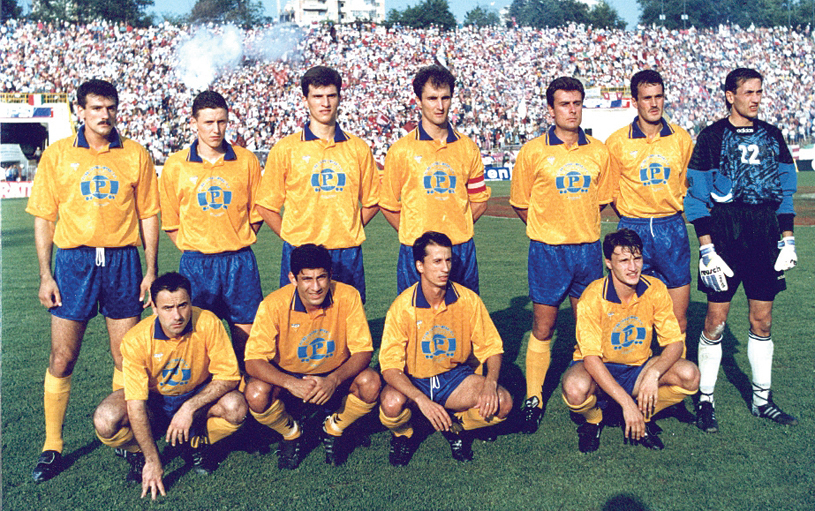
Petrolul squad that won the Romanian Cup in 1995.

In the 1994–95 season, despite a mediocre league result (10th place), coached by the same Marin Ion, Petrolul won the 1994–95 Cupa României after defeating their rivals, Rapid București, at the penalty shootout and qualified for the 1995–96 UEFA Cup. The team included the following players: Preda – D.Chiriță, Grigore, Răchită (C), Bălăceanu – Leahu, Grama, Pârlog, Abăluţă – Zmoleanu, Zafiris. 1995–96 season was started by "the Yellow and Blues" on 3 fronts, League, Cup and UEFA Cup. In the European competition they eliminated Welsh side Wrexham, in the first round, after a 0–0 on the Racecourse Ground and 1–0 victory on the Ilie Oană Stadium, goal scored by Pârlog in the 60th minute. The slow start would announce the early elimination, in the second round, when Austrian side Rapid Wien won 3–1 on aggregate after a 3–1 on the Gerhard Hanappi Stadium and a 0–0 draw in Ploiești. In the league Petrolul ended again in the top half of the table, on the 6th place and in the cup, was eliminated in the quarter-finals, by Național București, at the penalty shootout.

In the following years Petrolul occupied the following positions at the end of the championship: 1996–97 – 9th, 1997–98 – 14th, 1998–99 – 8th and 1999–2000 – 11th. The late 1990s have been marked by the fierce rivalry with Astra Ploiești, a team that promoted in the first league in 1998.

=== Second division struggles (2002–2011) ===
In the early 2000s, Petrolul entered under the ownership of Petrom's trade union president, Liviu Luca, and ploieștenii have a peak at the end of the 2000–01 Divizia A, when the team finished on the 2nd place. But the collapse followed. In 2002, the yellow and blues relegated to Divizia B and the city of Ploiești, which had 2 teams in Divizia A between 1998 and 2002, remained in the first league only with Astra, a club which had no presence in the top-flight of the Romanian football until 1998. The oilmen promoted back to Divizia A in 2003, after only one season in the second league, but only at one month after promotion, the club's management announced that the funding of the club is under question. In less than 30 days supporters have been announced that there will be a merger between Petrolul Ploieşti and Astra Ploieşti.

Astra Ploieşti changed its name to Petrolul Ploieşti and in July 2003 Petrolul Ploiești was unaffiliated from the Romanian Football Federation, leaving a vacant place in the first league, which was finally occupied by Oțelul Galați, team that lost in that summer a relegation play-out against the second league team FC Oradea. On 28 July 2003, Astra Ploieşti changed its name to FC Petrolul Ploieşti, with Florin Bercea and Ioan Niculae as the owners of the newly formed entity and also the new home becoming Astra Stadium. This alternative was chosen because at that time Petrolul Ploieşti was a nonprofit association and according to the Law of Sport it should have been transformed into SA and a merger with Astra Ploieşti in order to create a new company would have lasted at least seven months. These legal formalities have sometimes been interpreted as a proof of the dissolution of Petrolul, but such an interpretation is wrong because this club took over, according to FRF, Petrolul brand and record.

At the end of the 2003–04 Divizia A season, Petrolul relegated to Divizia B, and due to some differences in the ownership, Ioan Niculae gives up the 50% that he held within the club, these were split between Liviu Luca, Florin Bercea and Eduard Alexandru. Subsequently, Ioan Niculae refounded Astra and the new club is considered by LPF as the legal successor of the club before the 2003 merger, strengthening the idea that the 2003 merger result is the successor of the old Petrolul, not Astra. Petrolul also moved back to its old ground, Ilie Oană Stadium, in the summer of 2004. The 2004 relegation was followed by a black period for the yellow wolves, with seven consecutive Liga II season. In the 2004–05 season the club finished on the 4th place at 7 points from the promotion place, occupied at that time by Pandurii Târgu Jiu. 2005–06 season brought an extra chance, as a result of the restructuring of the first league from 16 to 18 teams, from the second league could also promote the 2nd place via a play-off tournament, but Petrolul finished only on the 3rd place at 3 points from the 2nd place, occupied by Unirea Urziceni, team that would promote and write history in the Romanian football.

In 2006, Petrolul ownership decided that the home games should be played on Flacăra Stadium from Moreni or Mogoșoaia Stadium, motivating the move by the fact that the old Ilie Oană Stadium required repair and modernization work. On 12 October 2006, the supporters organized a protest in the city center of Ploiești, asking for the team to be transferred from the private ownership to the Ploiești Municipality and to return on its own home ground. Despite these internal problems Petrolul made a good season, but ended again just below the promotion line, on the 3rd place. The end of the 2007–08 season found the yellow and blues on the 3rd place again, increasing the frustration among supporters and players, 5 points split the team from the 2nd place, a promotable one. Next season, 2008–09 was a disastrous one, Petrolul finished on 4th place, but at great distance from the 2nd (Astra, named FC Ploiești at that time) and 1st place (Ceahlăul Piatra Neamț), 22 points respectively 23 points, also with a tense situation at the administrative level and with not many options on the horizon.

In 2009 the team was taken over by Ploiești Municipality and Valeriu Răchită, former player of the team, was reconfirmed as the head coach, the squad being also restructured with many young players and after a great campaign in which the hope of promotion was alive until the last second, Petrolul finished 3rd, at only 1 point from the promotion spot, occupied by Sportul Studențesc, which led to a terrible disappointment, making the Ploiești people to wonder whether the team was followed by bad luck. Petrolul started the 2010–11 season with important changes, the young squad has been completed with some experienced players as Pompiliu Stoica, Florentin Dumitru or Daniel Oprița and moved for its home matches on Conpet Stadium from Strejnicu, near Ploiești, facilitating easier access for the supporters, new Ilie Oană Stadium, being still in construction, also the team was moved from the first to the second series of the second league and after a heavy fight in 3 teams, against FC Bihor Oradea and CS Mioveni, Petrolul promoted from the 1st place, 1 point ahead FC Bihor, team that also occupied a promotable place after 7 consecutive Liga II seasons and 2 points ahead CS Mioveni, which subsequently promoted by taking advantage of the financial problems of FC Bihor. The promotion coincided with the inauguration of the new stadium, all of these brought a great enthusiasm among the Petrolul supporters, players and staff.

=== Mild success followed by bankruptcy (2011–2016) ===
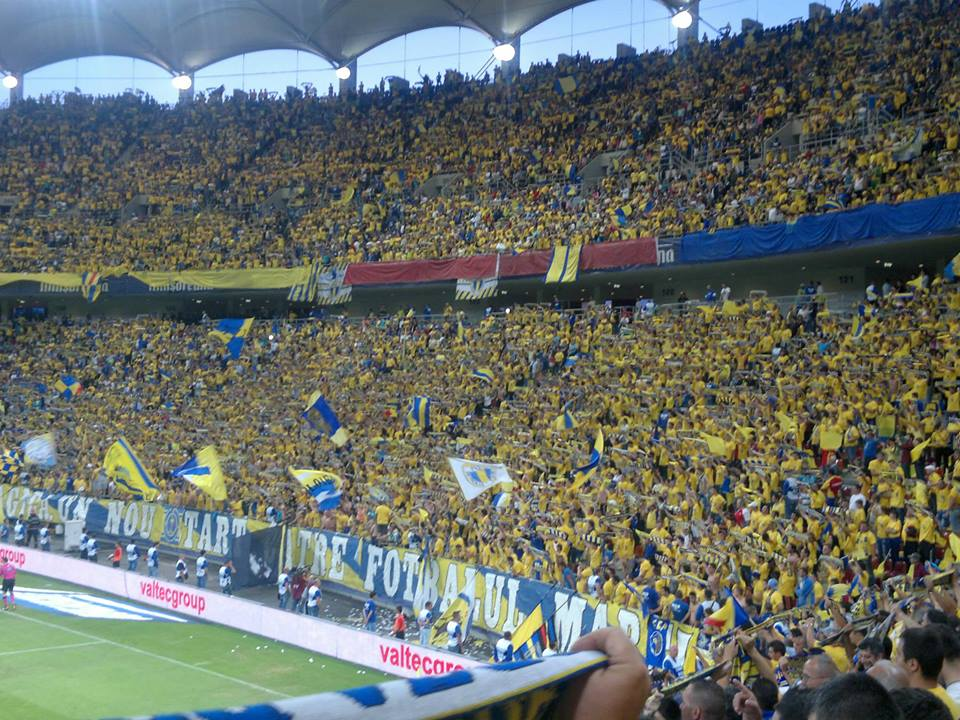
Petrolul fans at the 2013 Romanian Cup Final in Bucharest

Under the management of Cosmin Contra, their second season since return saw them finishing third in the league table, as well as claiming the national cup for the third time in their history. Consequently, Petrolul earned a spot in the second qualifying round of the 2013–14 UEFA Europa League, with the club playing its first European match since 1995. After defeating Víkingur Gøta and Vitesse Arnhem, they were eliminated in the play-off round by Swansea City.

The team received consistent media attention after signing former Romanian internationals Adrian Mutu and Ianis Zicu in January 2014, a move which would later be considered a "failure". During the same month, it was announced that German automobile manufacturer Opel would become Petrolul's shirt sponsor. Petroliștii had the chance to qualify for their second consecutive Cupa României final, but lost the semi-final against rivals Astra Giurgiu 2–1 on aggregate. Petrolul came third in the Liga I once more, while the fans challenged Răzvan Lucescu, considering that he wasn't a suitable replacement for Contra, who left Petrolul in March to join Spanish side Getafe.

In the next season's European participation, "the Yellow Wolves" confronted Czech club Viktoria Plzeň in the Europa League third qualifying round. After a draw in Ploiești, Petrolul impressively beat Viktoria scoring four goals and conceding only one. However, Petrolul yet again missed the chance of advancing to the group stage after losing the play-off against Dinamo Zagreb. In September 2014, head coach Lucescu was sacked and Mutu left the club as a free agent. On 25 November, president Daniel Capră, general director Marius Bucuroiu and five other persons faced preventive detention for 24 hours, being suspected of tax evasion and money laundering. The criminal offences made by the club's officials caused Petrolul to lose important players and face a period of instability. In February 2015, the club went into administration and eventually finished the season on the sixth place in Liga I.

More players left the club in the summer of 2015 and coach changes became frequent. Petrolul quickly landed on the last place in the league table, where it stayed until the last game of the season. Finally, in the summer of 2016 the team was declared bankrupt.

=== Reestablishment and recent history (2016 onwards) ===
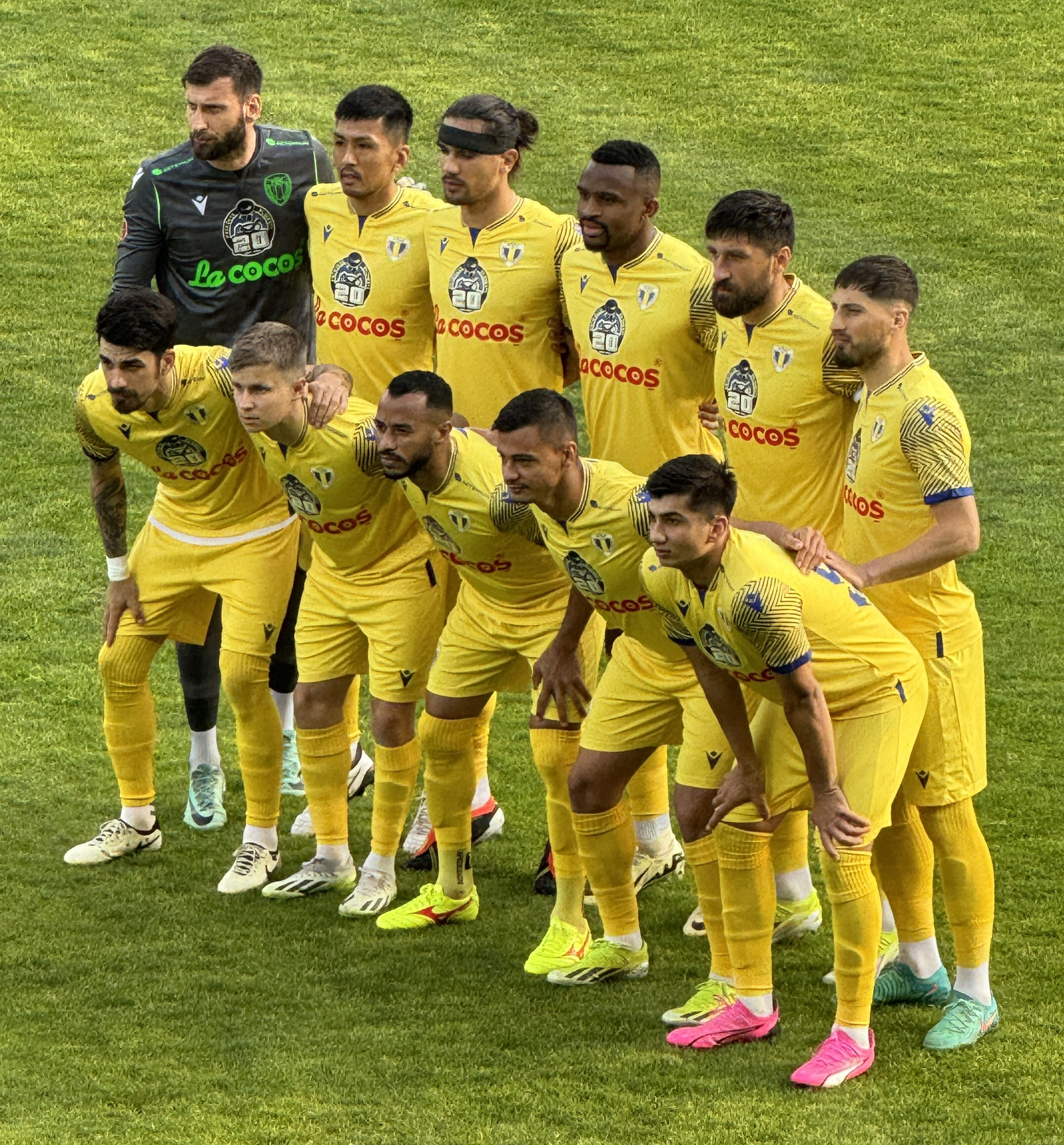
Petrolul Ploiești players taking a group photo before a home match against UTA Arad in the 2023–24 Liga I season

After the team was dissolved in 2016 as a result of the SC FC Petrolul SA joint-stock company bankruptcy, club legends and supporter groups associated to promptly reestablish it under the name of ACS Petrolul 52 Ploiești and enroll it in the Liga A Prahova (Liga IV), the fourth tier of the Romanian league system. During early 2017, French transnational company Veolia became the financial partner of the club by joining the association.

In June 2017, ACS Petrolul 52 leased the club brand identity from the Municipality of Ploiești for €30,000 and began using the former name of FC Petrolul Ploiești. The team managed back-to-back promotions and reached the second division in the summer of 2018. After three failed attempts to return to the Liga I and with worsening competitive results each year, Veolia stopped fully financing Petrolul and only offered to become a sponsor from the 2021–22 season, a position from which it also withdrew at the start of 2022.

In spite of the economic issues that arose from Veolia's departure, the squad led by head coach Nicolae Constantin managed to end the Liga II campaign as champions. Petrolul finished on the eighth place in the regular season of the 2022–23 Liga I, and thus started the relegation play-outs from the second place. In March 2023, the association of former players which controlled the club stepped down and former CFR Cluj and Universitatea Craiova president Marian Copilu was announced as the new owner-president. Petrolul also finished the 2022–23 season on the eighth place overall.

From the 2024–25 season, Petrolul re-established its reserve team in partnership with Daniel Chiriță, the owner of Liga IV club Petrolul 95 Ploiești. The reserve team was entered into Liga III and plays its home matches at Stadionul Conpet in Strejnic. In June 2024, departing president Copilu received a €1.5 million payout against future television rights. Turkish investors Serhan Çetinsaya and Sertaç Güven subsequently took over the club that summer, appointing former Turkish international Mehmet Topal as head coach, but soon withdrew amid the club's worsening financial situation.

On 8 June 2026, a court approved Petrolul's entry into judicial reorganisation to restructure debts totalling approximately €9 million, marking the club's second insolvency proceedings after those initiated in 2015. The debt included €4.4 owed to tax authorities, and the club pledged to cut its budget by 40% under court supervision to avoid liquidation.

== Grounds ==
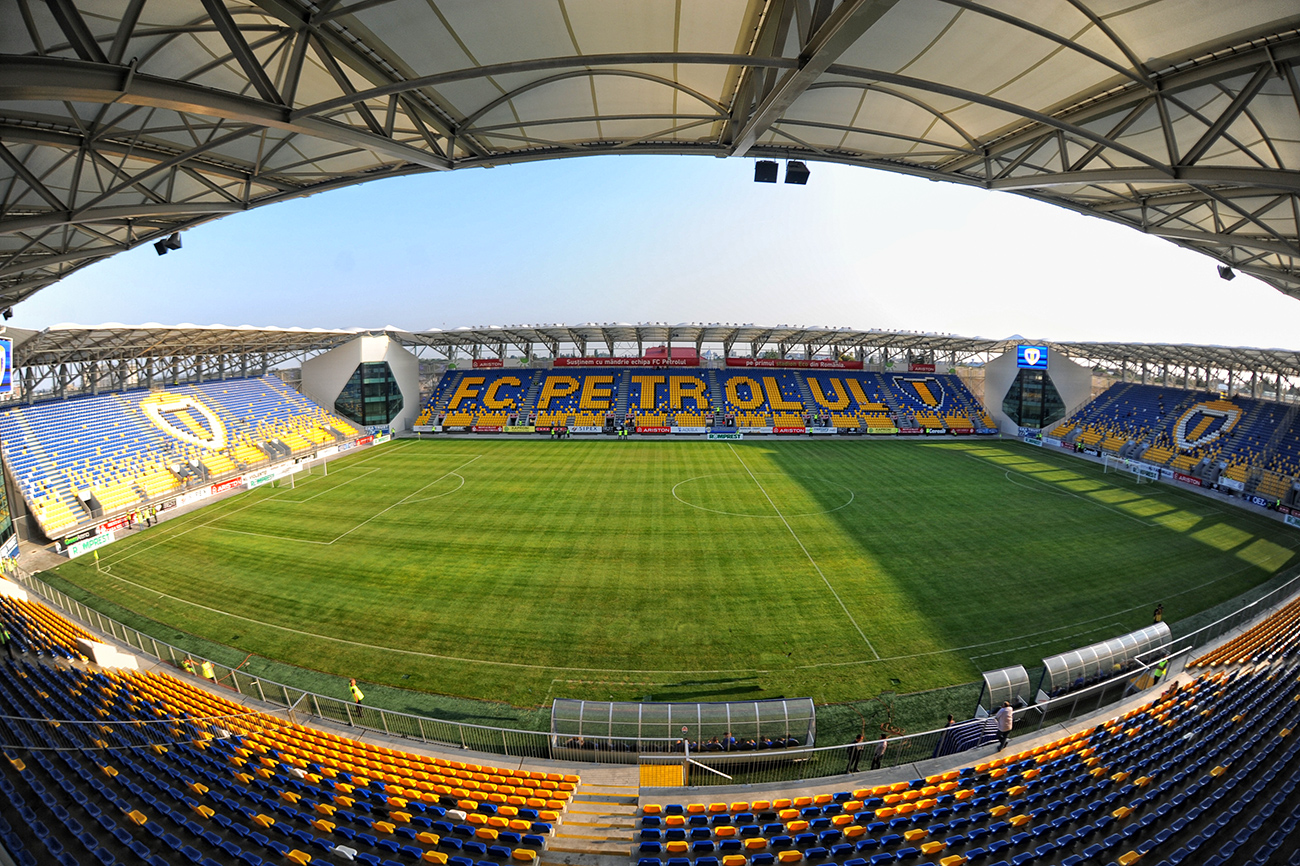
The new Ilie Oană Stadium

Petrolul Ploiești plays its home matches at the Ilie Oană Stadium. Ranked as a UEFA Category 4 stadium, it can host UEFA Europa League semi-finals and UEFA Champions League group stage matches. It was inaugurated in September 2011 and has a current capacity of 15,073 spectators. The construction was raised on the site of the former Ilie Oană Stadium, which was completed in 1937, and is named after Ilie Oană, the most important coach in Petrolul's history.

=== Milestones ===
- The first match to be played at the stadium was an exhibition game between a team of former Petrolul Ploiești players, the generation which won the Romanian Cup in 1995, and a selection of former Romanian internationals, amongst which Gheorghe Hagi, Gheorghe Popescu, Viorel Moldovan, Ovidiu Stângă and Daniel Prodan. The former internationals won the match 4–3. The first goal scored on this stadium belonged to Cristian Zmoleanu.
- Petrolul's first competitive match at the stadium was a Liga I game against Dinamo București on 25 September 2011, which ended 5–1 for the Bucharest team. Dinamo player Cosmin Moți scored the first goal of the game and thus the first official goal at new Ilie Oană Stadium.
- The Romania national football team played its first official match at the Ilie Oană on 29 March 2015, against Faroe Islands.
- Petrolul celebrated its centenary on 12 October 2024 with a friendly match against Vitesse Arnhem. The match ended a draw 1-1, Tommi Jyry scoring for Petrolul and Giovanni Buttner for Vitesse.
- Three matches of the 2025 UEFA European Under-19 Championship were played here in June 2025: England-Norway 2-2, Norway-Netherlands 0-2 and Montenegro-Spain 0-5.

== Support ==
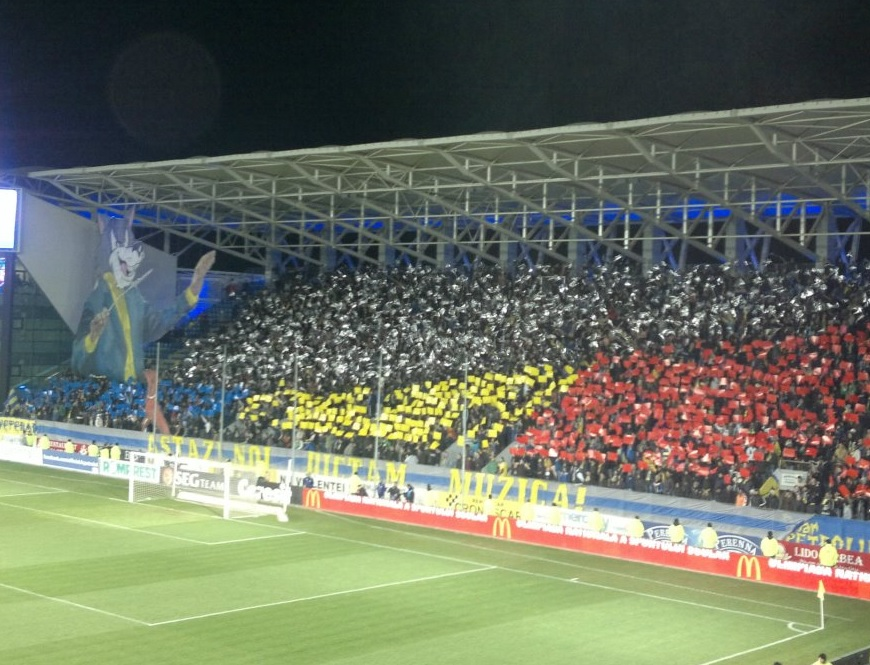
Petrolul supporters displaying a 3D choreography

Petrolul Ploiești has a large fan base in Prahova County and attachment to the team is common in Romania.

The biggest ultras group is called Lupii Galbeni ("the Yellow Wolves") since 1996, and there are two stands with groups like Peluza Latină ("The Latin Stand"), with subgroups like Knot04, United or Maniacs, and the Peluza 1 Ilie Oană ("Peluza 1 Ilie Oană stand") with subgroups like Hooligans, Young Hooligans, Contrasens, Lethalgang or Zona Vest. Other supporter associations, such as Liga Suporterilor Constantin Tabarcea (LSCT), Asociația Diaspora Galben Albastră (ADGA), T2 or Young Wolves are located in the Second Stand of the stadium. Before and during matches, they sing the club's chant, whose lyrics were written by George Nicolescu.

Petrolul Ploiești fans have recently established close friendships with the supporters of fellow league club Oțelul Galați, as well as with the ones of foreign clubs Vitesse, Salernitana, and Genk.

=== Rivalries ===
Petrolul Ploiești's traditional rival is Rapid București. They faced for the first time on 11 November 1931, when Juventus București tied CFR București 3–3 at home, on the Stadionul Romcomit, and have maintained a strong rivalry despite long periods of not meeting when one or the other were playing in the second division. In the 1965–66 season, Petrolul won the Liga I while Rapid finished second. The following year, Rapid won its first national title after a match played on the old Ilie Oană Stadium; these events are believed to have ignited the rivalry further. Due to the fact that this rivalry is the oldest for Romanian teams still active, it entered into the collective consciousness as the Primvs derby (Latin for "first" or "foremost").

Petrolul maintained a milder rivalry with the defunct Astra Giurgiu, its former local enemy. Astra promoted for the first time to the Liga I in 1998 and played in Ploiești until September 2012, when it was moved to Giurgiu. Even after relocation, the rivalry continued between the governances of the clubs, until Astra folded in October 2022.

Petrolul fans also hold grudges against the other historically prosperous Bucharest teams, namely FCSB, Dinamo, and CSA Steaua. They sometimes chant against them even outside of direct matches.

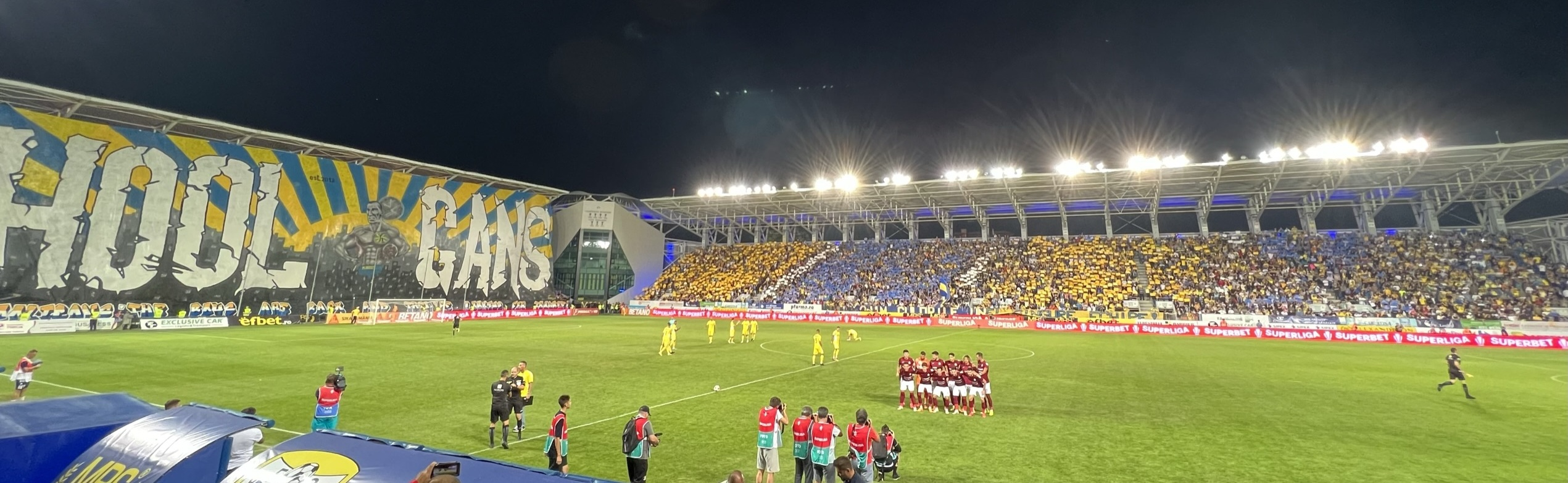

== Honours ==
=== Domestic ===
Chart of Petrolul Ploiești's league performance 1933–2017.

- Divizia A / Liga I
  - Winners (4): 1929–30, 1957–58, 1958–59, 1965–66
  - Runners-up (3): 1925–26, 1955, 1961–62
- Divizia B / Liga II
  - Winners (9): 1940–41, 1953, 1976–77, 1981–82, 1984–85, 1988–89, 2002–03, 2010–11, 2021–22
  - Runners-up (1): 1980–81
- Liga III
  - Winners (1): 2017–18
- Cupa României
  - Winners (3): 1962–63, 1994–95, 2012–13
  - Runners-up (1): 1952
- Supercupa României
  - Runners-up (2): 1995, 2013

=== Regional ===
- Liga IV – Prahova County
  - Winners (1): 2016–17
- Cupa României – Prahova County
  - Winners (1): 2016–17

=== Invitational ===
- Bangladesh President's Gold Cup
  - Champions (1): 1993

== Players ==
=== First-team squad ===
As of 18 August 2026

Note: Flags indicate national team as defined under FIFA eligibility rules; some limited exceptions apply. Players may hold more than one non-FIFA nationality.

No.	Pos.	Nation	Player
1	GK	ROU	Ștefan Rădulescu
2	DF	ROU	Andres Dumitrescu
4	DF	ROU	Paul Papp (Captain)
7	MF	POR	Rodrigo Martins
8	MF	ARG	Lucho Vega
9	FW	ENG	Dan Nlundulu
10	MF	CRC	Alejandro Bran
11	FW	ROU	Robert Jerdea
12	GK	ROU	Ștefan Georgescu
18	MF	AZE	Cəlal Hüseynov
19	MF	POR	Léo Teixeira
20	DF	ROU	Sergiu Hanca (Vice-captain)
21	MF	ROU	David Paraschiv

No.	Pos.	Nation	Player
22	DF	ROU	Mark Țuțu
24	DF	NED	Adam Zaian
26	DF	ROU	Liviu Argeșanu
28	MF	ROU	Marius Costache
29	DF	GER	Kilian Ludewig (4th captain)
30	FW	ROU	Rareș Leescu
38	GK	CZE	Lukáš Zima (3rd captain)
40	MF	ROU	Rareș Manolache
66	DF	ROU	Tiberiu Căpușă
71	DF	SUI	Breston Malula
80	MF	ROU	Mario Ioniță
99	MF	NGR	Israel Dele

=== Out on loan ===
Note: Flags indicate national team as defined under FIFA eligibility rules; some limited exceptions apply. Players may hold more than one non-FIFA nationality.

No.	Pos.	Nation	Player
87	FW	ROU	David Ilie (at Oxigen București until 30 June 2027)
97	MF	ROU	Augustin Dumitrache (at Blejoi until 30 June 2027)
—	GK	ROU	Sebastian Pârnău (at Plopeni until 30 June 2027)
—	GK	ROU	Ștefan Rudacovschi (at Blejoi until 30 June 2027)
—	DF	ROU	Denis Draghia (at Teleajenul Vălenii de Munte until 30 June 2027)

No.	Pos.	Nation	Player
—	MF	ROU	Vladimir Badea (at Odorheiu Secuiesc until 30 June 2027)
—	MF	ROU	Alexandru Burcilă (at Băicoi until 30 June 2027)
—	FW	ROU	Mihail Cursaru (at Teleajenul Vălenii de Munte until 30 June 2027)
—	FW	ROU	Sebastian Guiu (at Teleajenul Vălenii de Munte until 30 June 2027)

== Club officials ==
=== Board of directors ===
Role	Name
Owner	(Romania) Asociația Clubul Sportiv Petrolul 52
Executive President	(Romania) Claudiu Tudor
Honorary President	(Romania) Mircea Dridea
Vice-president	(Romania) Cristian Fogarassy
Sporting Director	(Romania) Paul Pintilie
Financial Consultant	(Romania) Mircea Dumitrache
Head of Youth Development	(Romania) Daniel Movilă
Team Manager	(Romania) Costel Ilie
Press Officer	(Romania) Ionuț Pană

- Last updated: 7 October 2024

=== Current technical staff ===
Role	Name
Head coach	(Portugal) Ricardo Sousa
Assistant coaches	(Portugal) Tiago Ferreira (Portugal) André Matos
Goalkeeping coach	(Romania) Cătălin Grigore
Fitness coaches	(Romania) Laurențiu Marinescu (Romania) George Manea
Video analyst	(Portugal) Nuno Simão
Club doctor	(Romania) Mircea Miu
Medical Assistant	(Romania) Răduță Ghioca
Kinetotherapist	(Romania) Cosmin Scarlat
Masseurs	(Romania) Eduard Didiță (Romania) Andrei Rușină
Storeman	(Romania) Romeo Ivan

- Last updated: 22 August 2026

== Kit manufacturers and shirt sponsors ==
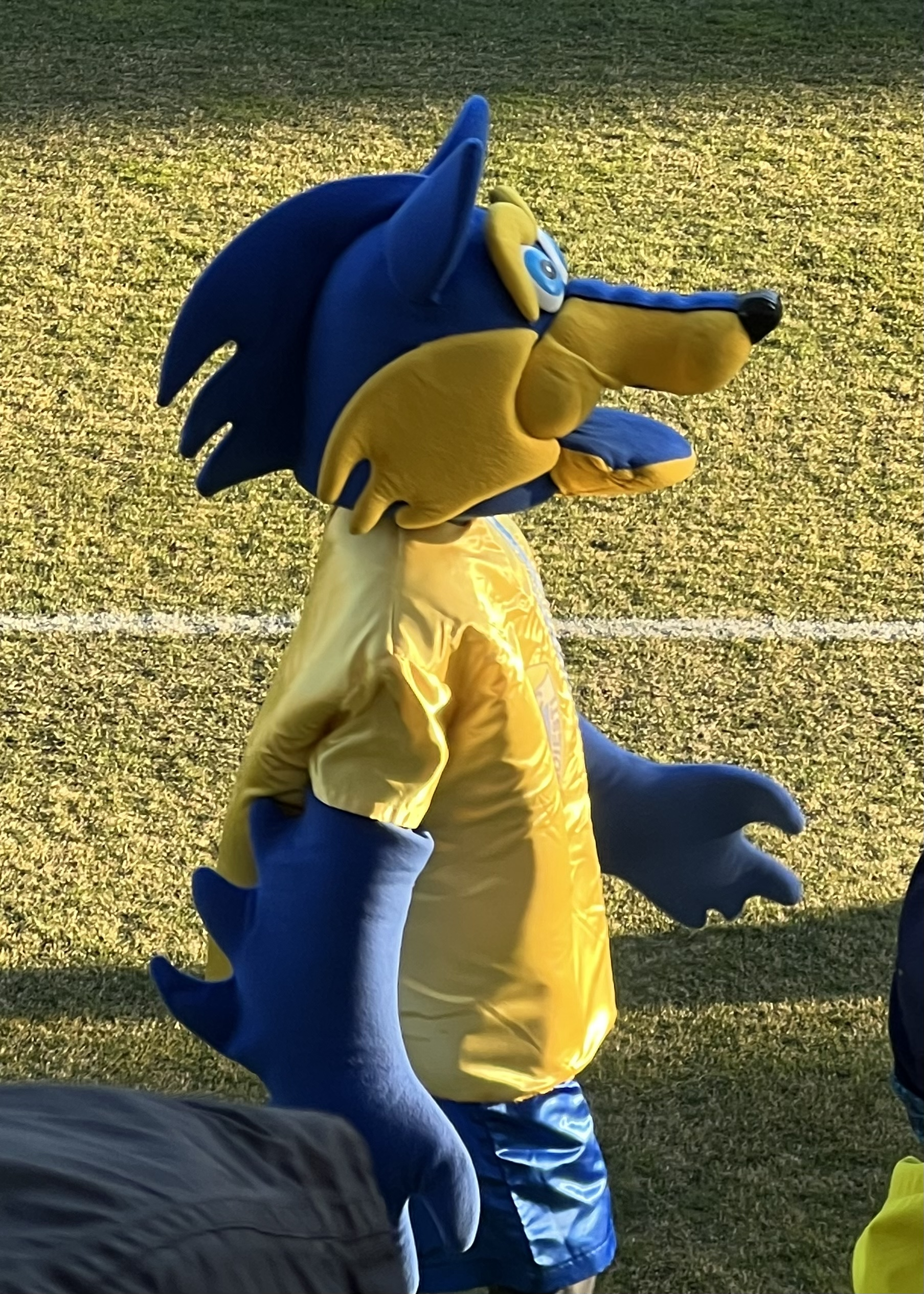
Petrolul mascot Lupino before a home game in March 2022

Period	Kit manufacturer	Shirt partner
1924–1994	Unknown	Unknown
1994-1995	Super Sport	Petrom
1995-1998	Unknown	Petrom
1998–2001	Meding Sport	Petrom
2001–2003	Adidas	Petrom
2003–2004	Lotto	Petrom
2005–2008	Lotto	Petrom
2008–2009	Team	Petrom
2009–2010	Team	Consiliul Local Ploiești
2010–2011	Hummel	Consiliul Local Ploiești
2011–2012	Adidas	Consiliul Local Ploiești
2012–2013	Macron	Romprest
2013–2014	Puma	Opel
2014–2015	Nike	Opel
2014–2015	Nike	Alexandrion
2015–2016	Nike	Superbet
2016–2017	Errea	Viking Pruszyński
2017–2022	Joma	Veolia
2022–2023	Adidas	MRS
2023–2024	Macron	La Cocoș
2024-2025	Macron	MrBit, La Cocoș
2025-2026	Macron	MrBit
2026-	Macron	Cashpot

== European record ==
Petrolul Ploiești has participated in eight editions of the club competitions governed by UEFA, the chief authority for football across Europe, and 12 editions of European competitions overall.

Competition	S	P	W	D	L	GF	GA	GD
UEFA Champions League / European Cup	3	8	2	1	5	8	15	−7
UEFA Cup Winners' Cup / European Cup Winners' Cup	2	6	2	2	2	4	7	−3
UEFA Europa League / UEFA Cup	3	14	7	2	5	25	20	+5
UEFA Intertoto Cup	1	6	1	1	4	6	14	−8
Inter-Cities Fairs Cup	3	13	9	0	4	14	11	+3
Total	12	47	21	6	20	57	67	−10

Notable wins

Season	Match	Score
European Fairs Cup
1962–63	Petrolul – (Hungary) Ferencváros	1 – 0
1967–68	Petrolul – (Socialist Federal Republic of Yugoslavia) Dinamo Zagreb	2 – 0
European Cup Winners Cup
1963–64	Petrolul – (Turkey) Fenerbahçe	1 – 0
European Cup / Champions League
1966–67	Petrolul – (England) Liverpool	3 – 1
European Intertoto Cup
1990	Petrolul – (Germany) Fortuna Düsseldorf	3 – 2
UEFA Cup / Europa League
2013–14	Petrolul – (Netherlands) Vitesse	2 – 1
2013–14	Petrolul – (England) Swansea City	2 – 1
2014–15	Petrolul – (Czech Republic) Viktoria Plzeň	4 – 1

== League history ==
Season	Tier	Division	Place	National Cup
2026–27	1	Liga I	TBD	TBD
2025–26	1	Liga I	12th	Group Stage
2024–25	1	Liga I	9th	Group Stage
2023–24	1	Liga I	11th	Group Stage
2022–23	1	Liga I	8th	Group Stage
2021–22	2	Liga II	1st (C, P)	Round of 32
2020–21	2	Liga II	9th	Quarter-finals
2019–20	2	Liga II	5th	Quarter-finals
2018–19	2	Liga II	4th	Third round
2017–18	3	Liga III (Seria III)	1st (C, P)	Round of 32
2016–17	4	Liga IV (PH)	1st (C, P)	(winners of county phase)
2015–16	1	Liga I	14th (R)	Round of 16
2014–15	1	Liga I	6th	Semi-finals
2013–14	1	Liga I	3rd	Semi-finals
2012–13	1	Liga I	3rd	Winners
2011–12	1	Liga I	14th	Quarter-finals
2010–11	2	Liga II (Seria II)	1st (C, P)	Round of 32
2009–10	2	Liga II (Seria I)	3rd	Fourth Round
2008–09	2	Liga II (Seria I)	4th	Round of 32

Season	Tier	Division	Place	National Cup
2007–08	2	Liga II (Seria I)	3rd	Fourth Round
2006–07	2	Liga II (Seria I)	3rd	Fifth Round
2005–06	2	Divizia B (Seria II)	3rd	Semi-finals
2004–05	2	Divizia B (Seria II)	4th	Fifth Round
2003–04	1	Divizia A	15th (R)	Quarter-finals
2002–03	2	Divizia B (Seria I)	1st (C, P)	Round of 32
2001–02	1	Divizia A	15th (R)	Round of 32
2000–01	1	Divizia A	9th	Semi-finals
1999–00	1	Divizia A	11th	Quarter-finals
1998–99	1	Divizia A	8th	Quarter-finals
1997–98	1	Divizia A	14th	Round of 32
1996–97	1	Divizia A	9th	Quarter-finals
1995–96	1	Divizia A	6th	Quarter-finals
1994–95	1	Divizia A	10th	Winners
1993–94	1	Divizia A	5th	Round of 32
1992–93	1	Divizia A	16th	Round of 16
1991–92	1	Divizia A	10th	Round of 16
1990–91	1	Divizia A	7th	Round of 16
1989–90	1	Divizia A	4th	Semi-finals

== Notable former players ==
The footballers enlisted below have had international caps for their respective countries at junior and/or senior level and/or more than 100 caps for FC Petrolul Ploiești.

Romania

- (Romania) Marcel Abăluță
- (Romania) Alexandru Badea
- (Romania) Dragu Bădin
- (Romania) Eugen Baștină
- (Romania) Alexandru Benga
- (Romania) Florea Birtașu
- (Romania) Alexandru Boc
- (Romania) Alexandru Borbely
- (Romania) Iuliu Borbely
- (Romania) Jean-Claude Bozga
- (Romania) Gheorghe Brandabura
- (Romania) Mario Bratu
- (Romania) Constantin Budescu
- (Romania) Daniel Chiriță
- (Romania) Grigore Ciupitu
- (Romania) Vasile Cosarek
- (Romania) Anghel Crețeanu
- (Romania) Adrian Cristea
- (Romania) Octavian Dincuță
- (Romania) Mircea Dridea
- (Romania) Virgil Dridea
- (Romania) Florian Dumitrescu
- (Romania) Florentin Dumitru
- (Romania) Lucian Dumitriu
- (Romania) Florea Fătu
- (Romania) Mihai Flamaropol
- (Romania) Alexandru Fronea
- (Romania) Octavian Grigore
- (Romania) Gheorghe Grozav
- (Romania) Gheorghe Grozea
- (Romania) Bujor Hălmăgeanu
- (Romania) Ovidiu Hoban
- (Romania) Petre Ivan
- (Romania) Mihai Ionescu
- (Romania) Nicolae Ionescu
- (Romania) Costel Lazăr
- (Romania) Gheorghe Leahu
- (Romania) Gheorghe Liliac
- (Romania) Cătălin Liță
- (Romania) Alexandru Mateiu
- (Romania) Marius Măldărășanu
- (Romania) Marcel Marin
- (Romania) Laurențiu Marinescu
- (Romania) Iulian Mihăescu
- (Romania) Dragoș Mihalache
- (Romania) Bujorel Mocanu
- (Romania) Mihai Mocanu
- (Romania) Constantin Moldoveanu
- (Romania) Anton Munteanu
- (Romania) Dumitru Munteanu
- (Romania) Adrian Mutu
- (Romania) Ion Neacșu
- (Romania) Dumitru Nicolae
- (Romania) Ilie Oană
- (Romania) Daniel Oprița
- (Romania) Gheorghe Pahonțu
- (Romania) Aurel Panait
- (Romania) Gabriel Paraschiv
- (Romania) Florin Pârvu
- (Romania) Gheorghe Petrescu
- (Romania) Ștefan Preda
- (Romania) Denis Radu
- (Romania) Valeriu Răchită
- (Romania) Mihnea Rădulescu
- (Romania) Adrian Ropotan
- (Romania) Vasile Sfetcu
- (Romania) Pompiliu Stoica
- (Romania) Constantin Tabarcea
- (Romania) Dinu Todoran
- (Romania) Valentin Țicu
- (Romania) Adrian Ursea
- (Romania) Cristian Vlad
- (Romania) Ion Zaharia
- (Romania) Constantin Zamfir

Algeria

- (Algeria) Karim Ziani

Albania

- (Albania) Armando Vajushi

Armenia

- (Armenia) Edgar Malakyan

Belarus

- (Belarus) Vasil Khamutowski

Bolivia

- (Bolivia) Gualberto Mojica

Brazil

- (Brazil) Jair
- (Brazil) Peçanha

Cameroon

- (Cameroon) Nana Falemi

Central African Republic

- (Central African Republic) Manassé Enza-Yamissi

Congo

- (Republic of the Congo) Férébory Doré

Croatia

- (Croatia) Kristijan Ipša

Curaçao

- (Curaçao) Gevaro Nepomuceno

DR Congo

- (Democratic Republic of the Congo) Jeremy Bokila

Finland

- (Finland) Tommi Jyry

France

- (France) Jean-Alain Fanchone
- (France) Tidiane Keïta

Ghana

- (Ghana) Amidu Salifu

Ivory Coast

- (Ivory Coast) Ismaël Diomandé

Haiti

- (Haiti) Jean Sony Alcénat
- (Haiti) Soni Mustivar

Israel

- (Israel) Toto Tamuz

Italy

- (Italy) Michele Paolucci

Japan

- (Japan) Takayuki Seto

Moldova

- (Moldova) Eugeniu Cebotaru
- (Moldova) Petru Racu

Netherlands

- (Netherlands) Bart Meijers

Poland

- (Poland) Łukasz Szukała

Portugal

- (Portugal) (Romania) Marian Huja
- (Portugal) Ricardinho
- (Portugal) Filipe Teixeira

Tunisia

- (Tunisia) Hamza Younés

Uruguay

- (Uruguay) Juan Albín

== Notable former managers ==
- (Romania) Ioan Andone
- (Romania) Constantin Cernăianu
- (Romania) Cosmin Contra
- (Romania) Nicolae Constantin
- (Romania) Mircea Dridea
- (Romania) Virgil Dridea
- (Romania) Octavian Grigore
- (Romania) Marin Ion
- (Romania) Traian Ionescu
- (Romania) Răzvan Lucescu
- (Romania) Viorel Mateianu
- (Romania) Mihai Mocanu
- (Romania) Gheorghe Mulțescu
- (Romania) Ilie Oană
- (Romania) Valeriu Răchită
- (Romania) Mircea Rednic
- (Romania) Victor Roșca
- (Romania) Valentin Stănescu
- (Turkey) Mehmet Topal

== Women's football ==
From the 2020–21 season, Romanian first league clubs have been required to field women's football teams to secure a licence from the Romanian Football Federation (FRF), including registering at least 20 players for the U15 Women's National Championship. Since the 2021–22 season, clubs must also enter a women's team in a senior championship (1st, 2nd, or 3rd league). From 2022–23, this mandate expanded to include 20 U15 players, 15 U13 players, and a senior team. In 2022–23, Petrolul Ploiești partnered with ACS Student Sport Alba Iulia to compete in the women's third league under Petrolul's name, while its Ploiești-based junior and senior teams played only friendly matches.

In 2023–24, Petrolul ended this partnership and established its first official women's team in the Women's third League, playing at the Vega, Soceram Pleașa, and Chimia Brazi stadiums in Ploiești. After the FRF restructured the women's leagues, Petrolul was invited to join the women's second league for the 2024–25 season.

=== Kit manufacturers and shirt sponsors ===
Perioada	Echipament	Sponsor
2023–2024	Adidas	MRS, La Cocoș
2024–	Macron	La Cocoș, ADGA

=== Managers ===
Depending on when they became coaches at Petrolul Ploiești
- 2022 Cristian Iordache

=== League history ===
Season	Tier	Division	Place	National Cup
2025–26	2	Women's 2nd League	Seria 1 - 7	Group Stage
2024–25	2	Women's 2nd League	Seria 1 - 6	Group Stage
2023–24	3	Women's 3rd League	Seria 2 - 2	3rd Round
2022–23	3	Women's 3rd League	Seria 1 - 5	1st Round
