= 2010–11 Liga II =

Liga II
- Season: 2010–11
- Country: Romania
- Teams: 32 (2x16)
- Promoted: Ceahlăul Piatra Neamț; Petrolul Ploiești; Concordia Chiajna; Mioveni; Voința Sibiu
- Relegated: Steaua II București; ACU Arad; Silvania Șimleu Silvaniei; Minerul Lupeni
- Top goalscorer: Alexandru Chițu (22 goals); Adrian Voiculeț (19 goals)

The 2010–11 Liga II was the 71st season of the second tier of the Romanian football league system. The season started on 28 August 2010 and ended on 4 June 2011.

FRF approved the new system with two divisions of 16 teams each, compared to the divisions of 18 teams used last season, thus coming back to the system that was used in the 1953 season, between the 1968–69 season and the 1972–73 season, in the 2001–02 season and in the 2002–03 season. At the end of the season, the top two teams of the series promoted to Liga I and the bottom three places from both series relegated to Liga III.

== Team changes ==
=== To Liga II ===
Promoted from Liga III

- CF Brăila
- Viitorul Constanța
- Juventus București
- Alro Slatina
- ACU Arad
- Voința Sibiu

Relegated from Liga I

- Internațional Curtea de Argeș**
- Politehnica Iași**
- Ceahlăul Piatra Neamț
- Unirea Alba Iulia

=== From Liga II ===
Relegated to Liga III

- Baia Mare**
- FCM Bacău
- Fortuna Covaci
- Jiul Petroșani
- Râmnicu Sărat
- Drobeta-Turnu Severin
- Cetatea Suceava
- CFR Timișoara

Promoted to Liga I

- Victoria Brănești
- Târgu Mureș
- Sportul Studențesc
- Universitatea Cluj

=== Note (**) ===
Internațional Curtea de Argeș withdrew from Liga I at the end of the season and was relegated directly in the Liga IV. Mureșul Deva was spared from relegation.

FC Politehnica Iași (1945) was dissolved after relegation from Liga I. A successor team was founded by the merge of Navobi Iași and Tricolorul Breaza and enrolled directly in the second league, due to the vacant place left by Baia Mare. The new team was named ACSMU Politehnica Iași.

Săgeata Stejaru left its second league licence to the newly formed Săgeata Năvodari. The new entity was founded by the former owners of Săgeata Stejaru, team which was subsequently enrolled in the lower leagues.

=== Renamed teams ===
Dunărea Giurgiu signed a partnership with Liga I side Astra Ploiești and started to be its second squad. Dunărea Giurgiu was renamed as Astra II Giurgiu.

Dacia Mioveni ended its sponsorship contract with Automobile Dacia and was renamed as CS Mioveni.

== Seria I ==
=== Stadia and locations ===
Location of (qualified) teams in Liga II 2010–11

Club	City	Stadium	Capacity
Astra II	Giurgiu	Marin Anastasovici	7,000
Botoșani	Botoșani	Municipal	12,000
Brăila	Brăila	Municipal	18,000
Ceahlăul	Piatra Neamț	Ceahlăul	18,000
Concordia	Chiajna	Concordia	5,000
Delta	Tulcea	Delta	12,000
Dinamo II	Bucharest	Florea Dumitrache	1,500
Dunărea	Galați	Dunărea	23,000
Farul	Constanța	Farul	15,500
Gloria	Buzău	Municipal	18,000
Juventus	Bucharest	Juventus	8,000
Otopeni	Otopeni	Otopeni	1,200
Săgeata	Năvodari	Petromidia	5,000
Snagov	Snagov	Snagov	2,000
Steaua II	Bucharest	Steaua II	500
Viitorul	Constanța	Ovidiu	1,000

=== League table ===
Pos	Team	Pld	W	D	L	GF	GA	GD	Pts	Qualification
1	Ceahlăul Piatra Neamț (C, P)	30	20	7	3	65	23	+42	67	Promotion to Liga I
2	Concordia Chiajna (P)	30	17	10	3	48	27	+21	61	Promotion to Liga I
3	Săgeata Năvodari (Note: Săgeata Năvodari qualified for a promotion play-off after FRF decided that a playoff round would be played for the last remaining place in the Liga I, following the relegation of five teams.)	30	18	4	8	50	27	+23	58	Qualification to promotion play-off
4	Delta Tulcea	30	17	4	9	50	37	+13	55	
5	Dunărea Galați	30	13	9	8	44	26	+18	48	
6	Otopeni	30	14	4	12	35	38	−3	46	
7	Botoșani	30	12	6	12	48	46	+2	42	
8	Viitorul Constanța (Note: Viitorul Constanța was ineligible for promotion due to the new license code that denied a team younger than 3 years to promote in the top-flight.)	30	10	11	9	37	37	0	41 (Note: Astra II 2–3 Viitorul; Viitorul 1–1 Astra II)	Ineligible for promotion
9	Astra II Giurgiu	30	11	8	11	42	44	−2	41	Ineligible for promotion
10	Gloria Buzău	30	9	11	10	33	34	−1	38	
11	FC Snagov	30	11	4	15	36	52	−16	37	
12	Dinamo II București	30	9	7	14	30	44	−14	34	Ineligible for promotion
13	Farul Constanța	30	8	6	16	27	45	−18	30	
14	Steaua II București (Note: Steaua II București was not spared from relegation because it was dissolved at the end of the season.) (R)	30	7	6	17	29	48	−19	27	Relegation to Liga III
15	CF Brăila (Note: CF Brăila was spared from relegation due to the withdrawal of Liga I side Unirea Urziceni.)	30	5	6	19	28	47	−19	21	Spared from relegation
16	Juventus București (Note: Juventus București was spared from relegation regarding the disaffiliation from the Romanian Football Federation of FCU Craiova.)	30	4	7	19	26	53	−27	19	Spared from relegation

Updated to match(es) played on 30 June 2011. Source: romaniansoccer.ro (in Romanian)
Rules for classification: 1) Points; 2) Head-to-head points; 3) Head-to-head goal difference; 4) Head-to-head goals scored; 5) Head-to-head away goals scored; 6) Goal difference; 7) Goals scored.
(C) Champions; (P) Promoted; (R) Relegated

=== Top scorers ===
Rank	Player	Club	Goals
1	(Romania) Alexandru Chițu	Săgeata Năvodari	22
2	(Romania) Cristinel Gafița	Ceahlăul Piatra Neamț	17
3	(Moldova) Eugeniu Cebotaru	Ceahlăul Piatra Neamț	14
4	(Romania) Ștefan Ciobanu	Delta Tulcea / Farul Constanța	13
5	(Romania) Nelu Bucă	Brăila / Dinamo II București	12
5	(Romania) Marius Jianu	Săgeata Năvodari	12

== Seria II ==
=== Stadia and locations ===
Location of competing teams in Liga II 2010–11

Club	City	Stadium	Capacity
ACU	Arad	Motorul	5,000
Alro	Slatina	Metalurgistul	4,000
Arieșul	Turda	Municipal	10,000
Argeș	Pitești	Nicolae Dobrin	15,000
Bihor	Oradea	Iuliu Bodola	18,000
Gaz Metan CFR	Craiova	CFR	3,000
Mioveni	Mioveni	Dacia	10,000
Mureșul	Deva	Cetate	4,000
Petrolul	Ploiești	Conpet	1,732
Politehnica	Iași	Emil Alexandrescu	11,390
Râmnicu Vâlcea	Râmnicu Vâlcea	Municipal	12,000
Silvania	Șimleu Silvaniei	Măgura	4,000
Unirea	Alba Iulia	Cetate	18,000
UTA	Arad	Francisc von Neumann	7,287
Voința	Sibiu	Municipal	14,000

=== League table ===
Pos	Team	Pld	W	D	L	GF	GA	GD	Pts	Qualification
1	Petrolul Ploiești (C, P)	28	18	5	5	46	22	+24	59	Promotion to Liga I
2	Bihor Oradea (Note: Bihor Oradea was denied a license for the Liga I due to financial problems.)	28	17	7	4	43	20	+23	58	Ineligible for promotion
3	Mioveni (Note: Mioveni were promoted instead of Bihor Oradea.) (P)	28	17	6	5	43	19	+24	57	Promotion to Liga I
4	Voința Sibiu (Note: Voința Sibiu qualified for a promotion play-off after FRF decided that a playoff round would be played for the last remaining place in the Liga I, following the relegation of five teams.) (O, P)	28	14	8	6	36	17	+19	50	Qualification to promotion play-off
5	Alro Slatina	28	14	6	8	46	26	+20	48	
6	Politehnica Iași	28	14	5	9	41	30	+11	47	
7	Râmnicu Vâlcea	28	11	3	14	35	39	−4	36	
8	UTA Arad	28	13	8	7	48	36	+12	35 (Note: UTA Arad were deducted 12 points for unpaid debts.)	
9	Arieșul Turda	28	8	9	11	26	31	−5	33	
10	Gaz Metan CFR Craiova	28	8	7	13	36	39	−3	31	
11	Unirea Alba Iulia	28	8	6	14	22	35	−13	30	
12	Argeș Pitești	28	8	5	15	27	40	−13	29	
13	Mureșul Deva	28	7	5	16	31	48	−17	26	
14	ACU Arad (Note: ACU Arad was not spared from relegation because it was dissolved at the end of the season.) (R)	28	6	7	15	18	36	−18	25	Relegation to Liga III
15	Silvania Șimleu Silvaniei (Note: Silvania Șimleu Silvaniei withdrew after the winter break and lost all the matches from the second part of the season by forfeit.) (R)	28	3	1	24	9	69	−60	10	Relegation to Liga III
16	Minerul Lupeni (Note: Minerul Lupeni withdrew in the first part of the season and all its results were cancelled.) (R)	0	0	0	0	0	0	0	0	Relegation to Liga III

Updated to match(es) played on 30 June 2011. Source: romaniansoccer.ro (in Romanian)
Rules for classification: 1) Points; 2) Head-to-head points; 3) Head-to-head goal difference; 4) Head-to-head goals scored; 5) Head-to-head away goals scored; 6) Goal difference; 7) Goals scored.
(C) Champions; (O) Play-off winners; (P) Promoted; (R) Relegated

=== Top scorers ===
Rank	Player	Club	Goals
1	(Romania) Adrian Voiculeț	UTA Arad	19
2	(Romania) Adrian Mărkuș	Bihor Oradea	12
3	(Romania) Laurențiu Boroiban	Gaz Metan CFR Craiova	11
3	(Romania) Daniel Oprița	Petrolul Ploiești	11
3	(Romania) Claudiu Ionescu	Mioveni	11
4	(Romania) Cătălin Bucur	Arieșul Turda	10
4	(Brazil) Roberto Ayza	Mioveni	10

== Promotion play-off ==
At the end of the season, FRF decided that a promotion playoff round would be played between Săgeata Năvodari and Voința Sibiu, third and fourth respectively in each series, following the relegation of five teams from the 2010–11 Liga I. Winners of the promotion spot came Voința Sibiu after winning 2–0 on aggregate score.

Team 1	Agg.	Team 2	1st leg	2nd leg
Săgeata Năvodari	0–2	Voința Sibiu	0–0	0–2

2 July 2011 First Leg	Săgeata Năvodari	0–0	Voința Sibiu	Năvodari
18:30		Report		Stadium: Petromidia; Attendance: 5,000; Referee: Alexandru Tudor (Bucharest)

6 July 2011 Second Leg	Voința Sibiu	2–0	Săgeata Năvodari	Sibiu
18:00	Forika 36'; Martinescu 89'	Report		Stadium: Municipal; Attendance: 13,500; Referee: Alexandru Deaconu (Bucharest)

== See also ==
- 2010–11 Liga I
- 2010–11 Liga III
