= 2008–09 Liga II =

Liga II
- Season: 2008–09
- Country: Romania
- Teams: 36 (2x18)
- Promoted: Ceahlăul Piatra Neamț; Unirea Alba Iulia; FC Ploiești; Internațional C.A.
- Relegated: Liberty Salonta; Buftea; Știința Bacău; ACU Arad; Progresul București; Prefab Modelu; FCM Târgoviște; Forex Brașov; Mechel Câmpia Turzii
- Top goalscorer: Sorin Gheju (18 goals); Ștefan Iordache (15 goals)

The 2008–09 Liga II was the 69th season of the second tier of the Romanian football league system. The season began on 16 August 2008 and lasted until 13 June 2009.

The format has been maintained to two series, each of them consisting of 18 teams. At the end of the season, the top two teams of the series promoted to Liga I and the bottom fourth places from both series relegated to Liga III.

== Team changes ==
=== To Liga II ===
Promoted from Liga III

- Cetatea Suceava
- FC Snagov
- FC Ploiești
- Internațional Curtea de Argeș
- Unirea Sânnicolau Mare**
- Luceafărul-Lotus Băile Felix
- Buftea
- ACU Arad

Relegated from Liga I

- Ceahlăul Piatra Neamț
- Dacia Mioveni
- UTA Arad
- Universitatea Cluj

=== From Liga II ===
Relegated to Liga III

- Inter Gaz București
- FCM Reșița
- Focșani
- Politehnica II Timișoara
- Dunărea Galați**
- FC Caracal
- Săcele
- Corvinul 2005 Hunedoara

Promoted to Liga I

- FC Brașov
- Argeș Pitești
- Otopeni
- Gaz Metan Mediaș

=== Note (**) ===
Unirea Sânnicolau Mare was absorbed by newly founded FCM Târgu Mureș, as a result of a merge. Unirea Sânnicolau Mare was refounded in the lower leagues.

FCM Câmpina was absorbed by Dunărea Galați, as a result of a merge. Dunărea Galați continued in the second tier on the place of Câmpina and FCM Câmpina was dissolved.

=== Renamed teams ===
Luceafărul-Lotus Băile Felix was moved from Băile Felix to Bacău and renamed/ re-founded as Știința Bacău.

IS Câmpia Turzii was renamed as Mechel Câmpia Turzii.

== League tables ==
=== Seria I ===
Pos	Team	Pld	W	D	L	GF	GA	GD	Pts	Qualification
1	Ceahlăul Piatra Neamț (C, P)	30	22	3	5	52	17	+35	69	Promotion to Liga I
2	FC Ploiești (P)	30	21	4	5	62	32	+30	67	Promotion to Liga I
3	Delta Tulcea	30	18	4	8	52	25	+27	58	
4	Petrolul Ploiești	30	13	6	11	47	41	+6	45	
5	Botoșani	30	13	5	12	52	49	+3	44	
6	FCM Bacău	30	11	8	11	33	43	−10	41 (Note: Bacău 0–1 Galați; Galați 1–2 Bacău)	
7	Dunărea Galați	30	12	5	13	42	31	+11	41	
8	Concordia Chiajna	30	11	6	13	27	24	+3	39	
9	Dinamo II București	30	11	5	14	43	60	−17	38	Ineligible for promotion
10	Sportul Studențesc București	30	10	7	13	45	37	+8	37 (Note: Giurgiu 2–4 Sportul; Sportul 1–2 Giurgiu)	
11	Dunărea Giurgiu	30	10	7	13	44	46	−2	37	
12	FC Snagov	30	9	7	14	44	57	−13	34	
13	Buftea (Note: Buftea sold its Liga II place to Săgeata Stejaru, at the end of the season.) (R)	30	8	9	13	47	61	−14	33	Relegation to Liga III
14	Cetatea Suceava	30	9	4	17	30	41	−11	31	
15	Știința Bacău (R)	30	6	8	16	28	54	−26	26	Relegation to Liga III
16	Progresul București (D, R)	30	10	4	16	24	54	−30	0 (Note: Progresul București was excluded after round 23, due to financial debts. Its results were maintained, but at the end of the season all its 34 points were deducted in order to be relegated.)	Relegation to Liga III
17	Prefab Modelu (Note: Prefab Modelu withdrew after round 15 and all its results were cancelled.) (D, R)	0	0	0	0	0	0	0	0	Relegation to Liga III
18	Forex Brașov (Note: Forex Brașov withdrew after round 10 and all its results were cancelled.) (D, R)	0	0	0	0	0	0	0	0	Relegation to Liga III

Updated to match(es) played on 30 June 2009. Source: romaniansoccer.ro (in Romanian)
Rules for classification: 1) Points; 2) Head-to-head points; 3) Head-to-head goal difference; 4) Head-to-head goals scored; 5) Head-to-head away goals scored; 6) Goal difference; 7) Goals scored.
(C) Champions; (D) Disqualified; (P) Promoted; (R) Relegated

=== Seria II ===
Pos	Team	Pld	W	D	L	GF	GA	GD	Pts	Qualification
1	Unirea Alba Iulia (C, P)	34	20	9	5	58	28	+30	69	Promotion to Liga I
2	Internațional Curtea Argeș (P)	34	19	7	8	61	40	+21	64	Promotion to Liga I
3	Târgu Mureș	34	16	9	9	54	27	+27	57	
4	Râmnicu Vâlcea	34	15	9	10	52	37	+15	54 (Note: Drobeta 1–1 Rm. Vâlcea; Rm. Vâlcea 1–0 Drobeta)	
5	Drobeta-Turnu Severin	34	15	9	10	48	43	+5	54	
6	Dacia Mioveni	34	15	6	13	45	40	+5	51 (Note: Mioveni 1–0 Liberty; Liberty 0–0 Mioveni)	
7	Liberty Salonta (Note: Liberty Salonta withdrew at the end of the season.) (R)	34	14	9	11	38	28	+10	51	Relegation to Liga III
8	Minerul Lupeni	34	14	6	14	41	43	−2	48	
9	UTA Arad	34	11	14	9	32	35	−3	47	
10	Bihor Oradea	34	13	7	14	44	49	−5	46 (Note: Jiul 1–1 Bihor; Bihor 2–1 Jiul)	
11	Jiul Petroșani	34	11	13	10	46	36	+10	46	
12	Mureșul Deva	34	13	6	15	44	51	−7	45	
13	Arieșul Turda	34	10	14	10	30	29	+1	44	
14	Universitatea Cluj	34	11	12	11	37	33	+4	43 (Note: Universitatea Cluj were deducted 2 points due to not achieving the 25 points limit in the Liga I, last season.)	
15	ACU Arad (R)	34	11	8	15	45	51	−6	41	Relegation to Liga III
16	CFR Timișoara (Note: CFR Timișoara was spared from relegation due to Liberty Salonta withdrawal.)	34	10	9	15	41	60	−19	39	Spared from relegation
17	FCM Târgoviște (R)	34	5	11	18	23	53	−30	26	Relegation to Liga III
18	Mechel Câmpia Turzii (R)	34	3	2	29	22	78	−56	11	Relegation to Liga III

Updated to match(es) played on 30 June 2009. Source: romaniansoccer.ro (in Romanian)
Rules for classification: 1) Points; 2) Head-to-head points; 3) Head-to-head goal difference; 4) Head-to-head goals scored; 5) Head-to-head away goals scored; 6) Goal difference; 7) Goals scored.
(C) Champions; (P) Promoted; (R) Relegated

== Top scorers ==
=== Seria I ===
15 goals

- (Romania) Ștefan Iordache (Dunărea Giurgiu)

12 goals

- (Romania) Daniel Costescu (Progresul București) / (Delta Tulcea)
- (Romania) Costin Curelea (Sportul Studențesc)
- (Romania) Cristinel Gafița (Ceahlăul Piatra Neamț)

7 goals

- (Romania) Ștefan Odoroabă (Petrolul Ploiești)

3 goals

- (Romania) Andrei Boroștean (Botoșani)

=== Seria II ===
18 goals

- (Romania) Sorin Gheju (Târgu Mureș)

15 goals

- (Romania) Cristian Luca (ACU Arad)

14 goals

- (Romania) Enache Câju (Râmnicu Vâlcea)

10 goals

- (Romania) Bogdan Vrăjitoarea (Liberty Salonta)

8 goals

- (Romania) Lucian Itu (Internațional Curtea de Argeș)

6 goals

- (Romania) Liviu Antal (Târgu Mureș)

5 goals

- (Romania) Robert Roszel (UTA Arad)

4 goals

- (Romania) Marian Constantinescu (Internațional Curtea de Argeș)

== See also ==
- 2008–09 Liga I
- 2008–09 Liga III
- 2008–09 Liga IV
