= 2009–10 Liga II =

Liga II
- Season: 2009–10
- Country: Romania
- Teams: 36 (2x18)
- Promoted: Victoria Brănești; Târgu Mureș; Sportul Studențesc; Universitatea Cluj
- Relegated: Baia Mare; FCM Bacău; Fortuna Covaci; Jiul Petroșani; Râmnicu Sărat; Drobeta-Turnu Severin; Cetatea Suceava; CFR Timișoara
- Top goalscorer: Viorel Ferfelea (23 goals); Paul Batin (15 goals)

The 2009–10 Liga II was the 70th season of the second tier of the Romanian football league system. The season started on 15 August 2009 and ended on 5 June 2010.

The format has been maintained to two series, each of them consisting of 18 teams. At the end of the season, the top two teams of the series promoted to Liga I and the bottom fifth places from both series relegated to Liga III. Two more teams relegated this season due to the format changing applied starting with the next season.

== Team changes ==
=== To Liga II ===
Promoted from Liga III

- Râmnicu Sărat
- Steaua II București
- Victoria Brănești
- Gaz Metan CFR Craiova
- Fortuna Covaci
- Baia Mare
- Tricolorul Breaza
- Silvania Șimleu Silvaniei
- Săgeata Stejaru**

Relegated from Liga I

- Argeș Pitești**
- Farul Constanța
- Otopeni
- Gloria Buzău

=== From Liga II ===
Relegated to Liga III

- Liberty Salonta**
- Buftea**
- Știința Bacău
- ACU Arad
- Progresul București
- Prefab Modelu
- FCM Târgoviște
- Forex Brașov
- Mechel Câmpia Turzii

Promoted to Liga I

- Ceahlăul Piatra Neamț
- Unirea Alba Iulia
- FC Ploiești
- Internațional Curtea de Argeș

=== Note (**) ===
FC Argeș Pitești was relegated for match fixing, Gaz Metan Mediaș, which initially relegated, was spared from relegation.

CS Buftea sold its Liga II place to third tier club Săgeata Stejaru.

Liberty Salonta withdrew at the end of the season, CFR Timișoara, which initially relegated, was spared from relegation.

== League tables ==
=== Seria I ===
Pos	Team	Pld	W	D	L	GF	GA	GD	Pts	Qualification
1	Victoria Brănești (C, P)	34	21	8	5	62	28	+34	71	Promotion to Liga I
2	Sportul Studențesc București (P)	34	20	8	6	65	26	+39	68	Promotion to Liga I
3	Petrolul Ploiești	34	18	13	3	58	20	+38	67	
4	FC Snagov	34	18	6	10	62	41	+21	60	
5	Delta Tulcea	34	17	8	9	41	23	+18	59	
6	Săgeata Stejaru	34	17	7	10	46	29	+17	58	
7	Concordia Chiajna	34	16	6	12	51	36	+15	54	
8	Farul Constanța	34	16	5	13	52	48	+4	53	
9	Dunărea Giurgiu	34	14	7	13	43	41	+2	49 (Note: Botoșani 0–1 Giurgiu; Giurgiu 2–1 Botoșani)	
10	Botoșani	34	13	10	11	45	36	+9	49	
11	Dunărea Galați	34	13	6	15	37	39	−2	45	
12	FCM Bacău (Note: FCM Bacău was excluded from the championship after round 32 and lost the remaining two matches by forfeit.) (R)	34	12	7	15	47	57	−10	43	Relegation to Liga III
13	Steaua II București	34	10	11	13	36	36	0	41	
14	Gloria Buzău (Note: Gloria Buzău was spared from relegation due to FCM Bacău exclusion.)	34	12	7	15	39	44	−5	35 (Note: Gloria Buzău were deducted 8 points due to not achieving the 25 points limit in the Liga I, last season.)	Spared from relegation
15	Dinamo II București (Note: Dinamo II București was spared from relegation due to the withdrawal of Liga I club Politehnica Iași.)	34	8	5	21	36	65	−29	29	Spared from relegation
16	Tricolorul Breaza (Note: Tricolorul Breaza was spared from relegation due to the withdrawal of Liga II club Baia Mare.)	34	8	4	22	31	66	−35	28	Spared from relegation
17	Râmnicu Sărat (R)	34	4	7	23	14	68	−54	19	Relegation to Liga III
18	Cetatea Suceava (Note: Cetatea Suceava withdrew during the winter break and lost all the matches from the second part of the season by forfeit.) (R)	34	2	9	23	14	76	−62	15	Relegation to Liga III

Updated to match(es) played on 30 June 2010. Source: romaniansoccer.ro (in Romanian)
Rules for classification: 1) Points; 2) Head-to-head points; 3) Head-to-head goal difference; 4) Head-to-head goals scored; 5) Head-to-head away goals scored; 6) Goal difference; 7) Goals scored.
(C) Champions; (P) Promoted; (R) Relegated

=== Seria II ===
Pos	Team	Pld	W	D	L	GF	GA	GD	Pts	Qualification
1	Târgu Mureș (C, P)	32	20	9	3	52	20	+32	69	Promotion to Liga I
2	Universitatea Cluj (P)	32	20	7	5	60	24	+36	67	Promotion to Liga I
3	Dacia Mioveni	32	19	9	4	46	20	+26	66	
4	UTA Arad	32	16	10	6	50	26	+24	58	
5	Argeș Pitești	32	16	6	10	48	30	+18	54	
6	Otopeni	32	15	8	9	59	40	+19	50 (Note: Otopeni were deducted 3 points due to not achieving the 25 points limit in the Liga I, last season.)	
7	Gaz Metan CFR Craiova	32	12	9	11	39	36	+3	45	
8	Baia Mare (Note: Baia Mare withdrew at the end of the season.) (R)	32	11	11	10	34	35	−1	44	Relegation to Liga III
9	Bihor Oradea	32	10	12	10	49	40	+9	42 (Note: Arieșul 2–3 Bihor; Bihor 2–2 Arieșul)	
10	Arieșul Turda	32	13	3	16	40	43	−3	42	
11	Silvania Șimleu Silvaniei	32	10	7	15	31	46	−15	37	
12	Minerul Lupeni	32	8	12	12	33	41	−8	36 (Note: Lupeni 0–0 Rm. Vâlcea; Rm. Vâlcea 3–3 Lupeni)	
13	Râmnicu Vâlcea	32	9	9	14	51	51	0	36	
14	Mureșul Deva (Note: Mureșul Deva was spared from relegation due to the withdrawal of Liga I side Internațional Curtea de Argeș.)	32	9	4	19	28	50	−22	31	Spared from relegation
15	Fortuna Covaci (R)	32	7	5	20	37	59	−22	26 (Note: Fortuna 2–3 Jiul; Jiul 0–3 Fortuna)	Relegation to Liga III
16	Jiul Petroșani (Note: Jiul Petroșani was excluded after round 21 and lost all the matches from the second part of the season by forfeit.) (R)	31	7	5	19	21	59	−38	26	Relegation to Liga III
17	Drobeta-Turnu Severin (Note: Drobeta-Turnu Severin withdrew during the winter break and lost all the matches from the second part of the season by forfeit.) (R)	31	5	2	24	12	70	−58	17	Relegation to Liga III
18	CFR Timișoara (Note: CFR Timișoara was excluded in the first part of the season and all its results were cancelled.) (R)	0	0	0	0	0	0	0	0	Relegation to Liga III

Updated to match(es) played on 30 June 2010. Source: romaniansoccer.ro (in Romanian)
Rules for classification: 1) Points; 2) Head-to-head points; 3) Head-to-head goal difference; 4) Head-to-head goals scored; 5) Head-to-head away goals scored; 6) Goal difference; 7) Goals scored.
(C) Champions; (P) Promoted; (R) Relegated

== Top Scorers ==
=== Seria I ===
23 goals

- (Romania) Viorel Ferfelea (Sportul Studențesc)

20 goals

- (Romania) Costin Curelea (Sportul Studențesc)

16 goals

- (Romania) Vasile Olariu (Victoria Brănești)

5 goals

- (Romania) Marius Nae (Sportul Studențesc)

=== Seria II ===
15 goals

- (Romania) Paul Batin (UTA Arad)

13 goals

- (Romania) Valentin Lemnaru (Universitatea Cluj)

12 goals

- (Romania) Victor Astafei (Arieșul Turda)
- (Cameroon) Kallé Soné (Otopeni)
- (Romania) Raymond Lukács (Bihor Oradea)
- (Romania) Dan Roman (Târgu Mureș)
- (Romania) Adrian Voiculeț (Argeș Pitești)

7 goals

- (Romania) Adrian Dulcea (Argeș Pitești)

6 goals

- (Romania) Iulian Tameș (Argeș Pitești)

5 goals

- (Romania) Robert Roszel (Baia Mare)

== See also ==
- 2009–10 Liga I
- 2009–10 Liga III
- 2009–10 Liga IV
