= 2009–10 Liga III =

Liga III
- Season: 2009–10
- Teams: 108

The 2009–10 Liga III was the 54th season of Liga III, the third tier of the Romanian football league system. The season started on 21 August 21 2009 and ended on 4 June 2010.

The winners of each division got promoted to the 2010–11 Liga II season.

The bottom six from each division were relegated at the end of the season to the county football leagues (Liga IV). From the 12th placed teams, another one was relegated. To determine this team, separate standings were computed, using only the games played against the clubs ranked 1st through 11th.

== Team changes ==
=== Promotion and relegation ===
Relegated from Liga II

- ACU Arad
- Progresul București
- FCM Târgoviște
- Mechel Câmpia Turzii

Promoted from Liga IV

- Gura Humorului
- Vaslui II
- Partizanul Merei
- Viitorul Ianca
- Oil Terminal Constanța
- Viscofil Popești-Leordeni
- Comprest GIM București
- Albota
- Ralbex Turcinești
- Ghecon Lăpușata
- Petrolul Teleajen Ploiești
- Voința Livezile
- Turul Micula
- Luceafărul Oradea
- Zlatna
- Recaș
- Voința Sibiu

Promoted to Liga II

- Râmnicu Sărat
- Steaua București II
- Victoria Brănești
- Gaz Metan CFR Craiova
- Fortuna Covaci
- Baia Mare
- Tricolorul Breaza
- Silvania Șimleu Silvaniei

Relegated to Liga IV

- Rarăul Câmpulung Moldovenesc
- Bacău II (withdrew)
- Bârlad (withdrew)
- Luceafărul Mihai Eminescu (withdrew)
- Inter Gaz București (withdrew)
- Năvodari (withdrew)
- Câmpina (withdrew)
- Royal Brașov
- Săcele (withdrew)
- Progresul București II (withdrew)
- Petrolul Ploiești II (withdrew)
- Petrom Chimia Craiova
- Balș
- CFR Craiova (withdrew)
- Vulcan
- Corvinul Hunedoara (withdrew)
- Bihor Oradea II
- Liberty Salonta II

=== Other changes ===
- Forex Brașov withdrew during the previous Liga II season and was enrolled in Liga IV Brașov County.
- Știința Bacău and Prefab Modelu withdrew during the previous Liga II season and were subsequently dissolved.
- CFR Timișoara was spared from relegation from the previous Liga II season due to the withdrawal of Liberty Salonta.
- Săgeata Stejaru acquired Buftea's Liga II place, with the latter taking its place in the third tier.
- The promoted side Progresul Gorgota ceded its place to CSM Târgoviște.
- The promoted side Dumitrești ceded its place to Domnești.
- Victoria Bod ceded its place to Argeșul Mihăilești.
- Ovidiu ceded its place to Viitorul Constanța.
- Inter ENA Făgăraș withdrew.
- Viitorul Însurăței and Marmația Sighetu Marmației were spared from relegation.
- Utchim Găești, Gaz Metan Mediaș II, and Retezatul Hațeg were admitted upon request.
- Laminorul Roman was renamed Petrotub Roman.

== League tables ==
=== Series I ===
Pos	Team	Pld	W	D	L	GF	GA	GD	Pts	Promotion or relegation
1	Brăila (C, P)	32	25	6	1	90	18	+72	81	Promotion to Liga II
2	Panciu	32	21	3	8	64	32	+32	66	
3	Petrotub Roman	32	19	7	6	68	30	+38	64	
4	Politehnica Iași II	32	17	6	9	60	37	+23	57	
5	Rapid CFR Suceava	32	16	3	13	58	42	+16	51	
6	Ceahlăul Piatra Neamț II	32	15	5	12	44	47	−3	50	
7	Politehnica Galați	32	14	6	12	49	47	+2	48 (Note: Politehnica Galați: 7 Pts, 7–4; Willy Bacău: 6 Pts, 5–6; Cetatea Târgu Neamț: 4 pts, 3–5.)	
8	Willy Bacău	32	15	3	14	61	58	+3	48	
9	Cetatea Târgu Neamț	32	14	6	12	47	46	+1	48	
10	Oțelul Galați II	32	14	4	14	51	36	+15	46	
11	Focșani	32	12	9	11	35	31	+4	45	
12	Aerostar Bacău	32	14	2	16	52	46	+6	44	
13	Pambac Bacău (R)	32	12	7	13	44	48	−4	43	Relegation to Liga IV
14	Pașcani (R)	32	11	5	16	43	53	−10	38	Relegation to Liga IV
15	Dunărea Galați II (R)	32	6	4	22	22	66	−44	22	Relegation to Liga IV
16	Vaslui II (R)	32	4	4	24	24	102	−78	16	Relegation to Liga IV
17	Gura Humorului (Note: Gura Humorului withdrew during the winter break and lost all remaining matches with 0–3.) (R)	32	2	2	28	8	81	−73	8	Relegation to Liga IV
18	Rădăuți (Note: Rădăuți withdrew during the first half and all its results were canceled.) (D)	0	0	0	0	0	0	0	0	Withdrew

Source: FRF (in Romanian)
Rules for classification: 1) Points; 2) Head-to-head points; 3) Head-to-head goal difference; 4) Head-to-head goals scored; 5) Head-to-head away goals scored; 6) Goal difference; 7) Number of goals scored.
(C) Champions; (D) Disqualified; (P) Promoted; (R) Relegated

=== Series II ===
Pos	Team	Pld	W	D	L	GF	GA	GD	Pts	Promotion or relegation
1	Viitorul Constanța (C, P)	34	29	2	3	85	13	+72	89	Promotion to Liga II
2	Berceni	34	26	4	4	90	17	+73	82	
3	Unirea Slobozia	34	20	5	9	71	33	+38	65	
4	Viscofil Popești-Leordeni	34	19	6	9	75	38	+37	63	
5	Callatis Mangalia	34	18	8	8	56	29	+27	62	
6	Petrolul Berca	34	18	7	9	50	40	+10	61	
7	Domnești	34	18	6	10	73	46	+27	60	
8	Dunărea Călărași	34	16	6	12	75	57	+18	54	
9	Tunari	34	14	6	14	47	44	+3	48	
10	Eforie	34	13	8	13	37	43	−6	47	
11	Partizanul Merei	34	12	7	15	48	57	−9	43	
12	Farul Constanța II (R)	34	9	13	12	42	43	−1	40	Relegation to Liga IV
13	Viitorul Însurăței (R)	34	10	7	17	39	47	−8	37	Relegation to Liga IV
14	Medgidia (R)	34	10	6	18	49	73	−24	36	Relegation to Liga IV
15	Viitorul Chirnogi (R)	34	10	3	21	35	81	−46	33	Relegation to Liga IV
16	Viitorul Ianca (R)	34	8	4	22	39	75	−36	28	Relegation to Liga IV
17	Utchim Găești (Note: Oil Terminal Constanța and Utchim Găești withdrew during the second half and will losT all remaining matches with 0–3.) (R)	33	2	2	29	19	105	−86	8 (Note: Utchim Găești are ahead of Oil Terminal Constanța on head-to-head points; Utchim Găești 4–1 Oil Terminal Constanța.)	Relegation to Liga IV
18	Oil Terminal Constanța (R)	33	2	2	29	15	104	−89	8	Relegation to Liga IV

Source: FRF (in Romanian)
Rules for classification: 1) Points; 2) Head-to-head points; 3) Head-to-head goal difference; 4) Head-to-head goals scored; 5) Head-to-head away goals scored; 6) Goal difference; 7) Number of goals scored.
(C) Champions; (P) Promoted; (R) Relegated

=== Series III ===
Pos	Team	Pld	W	D	L	GF	GA	GD	Pts	Promotion or relegation
1	Juventus București (C, P)	34	26	5	3	77	24	+53	83	Promotion to Liga II
2	Conpet Ploiești	34	24	5	5	74	25	+49	77	
3	Inter Clinceni	34	18	9	7	53	31	+22	63	
4	Electrosid Titu	34	18	5	11	58	41	+17	59	
5	Buftea	34	17	7	10	62	42	+20	58	
6	Chimia Brazi	34	16	9	9	72	34	+38	57	
7	Petrolistul Boldești	34	16	7	11	64	43	+21	55	
8	Rapid București II	34	16	6	12	59	39	+20	54 (Note: Rapid București II are ahead of Argeșul Mihăilești on goal difference; Rapid București II 0–0 Argeșul Mihăilești; Argeșul Mihăilești 0–0 Rapid București II.)	
9	Argeșul Mihăilești	34	16	6	12	37	30	+7	54	
10	Unirea Tărlungeni	34	15	6	13	42	38	+4	51	
11	Petrolul Videle	34	15	5	14	45	44	+1	50	
12	Comprest GIM București	34	14	7	13	59	51	+8	49 (Note: Comprest GIM București are ahead of Viitorul Toporu on head-to-head points; Comprest GIM București 2–1 Viitorul Toporu; Viitorul Toporu 0–3 Comprest GIM București.)	
13	Viitorul Toporu (Note: Viitorul Toporu, Victoria Adunații-Copăceni and Filipeștii de Pădure withdrew during the second half and lost all their remaining matches with 0–3.) (R)	34	15	4	15	49	49	0	49	Relegation to Liga IV
14	CSM Târgoviște (R)	34	10	6	18	43	61	−18	36	Relegation to Liga IV
15	Petrolul Teleajen Ploiești (Note: Petrolul Teleajen Ploiești was excluded during the second half and lost all remaining matches with 0–3.) (R)	32	6	5	21	27	72	−45	23	Relegation to Liga IV
16	Victoria Adunații-Copăceni (R)	34	6	3	25	30	80	−50	21	Relegation to Liga IV
17	Filipeștii de Pădure (R)	32	3	5	24	21	78	−57	14	Relegation to Liga IV
18	Predeal (Note: Predeal withdrew during the winter break and lost all remaining matches with 0–3.) (R)	32	2	0	30	14	104	−90	6	Relegation to Liga IV

Source: FRF (in Romanian)
Rules for classification: 1) Points; 2) Head-to-head points; 3) Head-to-head goal difference; 4) Head-to-head goals scored; 5) Head-to-head away goals scored; 6) Goal difference; 7) Number of goals scored.
(C) Champions; (P) Promoted; (R) Relegated

=== Series IV ===
Pos	Team	Pld	W	D	L	GF	GA	GD	Pts	Promotion or relegation
1	Alro Slatina (C, P)	34	23	9	2	75	27	+48	78	Promotion to Liga II
2	FCM Târgoviște	34	24	4	6	58	20	+38	76	
3	Triumf Bârca	34	18	5	11	53	37	+16	59	
4	Vișina Nouă	34	17	4	13	45	32	+13	55 (Note: Vișina Nouă are ahead of Oltchim Râmnicu Vâlcea on head-to-head points; Vișina Nouă 4–2 Oltchim Râmnicu Vâlcea; Oltchim Râmnicu Vâlcea 1–2 Vișina Nouă.)	
5	Oltchim Râmnicu Vâlcea	34	17	4	13	54	51	+3	55	
6	Prometeu Craiova	34	14	12	8	44	27	+17	54	
7	Argeș Pitești II	34	16	5	13	54	48	+6	53	
8	Alexandria	34	13	10	11	39	31	+8	49	
9	Albota	34	13	9	12	41	36	+5	48 (Note: Albota: 10 Pts, 5–2; Caracal: 4 Pts, 2–4; Ghecon Lăpușata: 3 Pts, 5–6.)	
10	Caracal	34	14	6	14	44	42	+2	48	
11	Ghecon Lăpușata	34	14	6	14	48	44	+4	48	
12	Minerul Mătăsari	34	14	5	15	37	40	−3	47	
13	Progresul Corabia (R)	34	14	4	16	57	55	+2	46	Relegation to Liga IV
14	Ralbex Turcinești (R)	34	12	7	15	44	49	−5	43	Relegation to Liga IV
15	Minerul Motru (R)	34	12	5	17	72	63	+9	41	Relegation to Liga IV
16	Armata Craiova (Note: Armata Craiova and Juventus Bascov withdrew during the second half and lost all their remaining matches with 0–3.) (R)	33	7	8	18	30	55	−25	29	Relegation to Liga IV
17	Universitatea Craiova II (R)	34	6	3	25	33	73	−40	21	Relegation to Liga IV
18	Juventus Bascov (R)	33	3	2	28	12	110	−98	11	Relegation to Liga IV

Source: FRF (in Romanian)
Rules for classification: 1) Points; 2) Head-to-head points; 3) Head-to-head goal difference; 4) Head-to-head goals scored; 5) Head-to-head away goals scored; 6) Goal difference; 7) Number of goals scored.
(C) Champions; (P) Promoted; (R) Relegated

=== Series V ===
Pos	Team	Pld	W	D	L	GF	GA	GD	Pts	Promotion or relegation
1	Pandurii Târgu Jiu II (Note: Pandurii Târgu Jiu were relegated at the end of 2009–10 Liga I season and will play in 2010–11 Liga II. Since reserve teams are not allowed to play in the same league tier as their first teams, Pandurii Târgu Jiu II, Pandurii's reserve team, were not promoted to Liga II despite finishing as champions. Instead, second-placed ACU Arad were promoted.) (C)	30	21	7	2	60	18	+42	70	
2	ACU Arad (P)	30	19	7	4	43	16	+27	64	Promotion to Liga II
3	Recaș	30	20	2	8	46	24	+22	62	
4	Marmosim Simeria	30	14	10	6	43	23	+20	52	
5	Național Sebiș	30	16	3	11	49	39	+10	51	
6	Minerul Mehedinți	30	13	9	8	46	32	+14	48	
7	Jiul Rovinari	30	11	9	10	43	37	+6	42	
8	Școlar Reșița	30	12	5	13	38	36	+2	41 (Note: Școlar Reșița are ahead of Millenium Giarmata on head-to-head points; Școlar Reșița 2–0 Millenium Giarmata; Millenium Giarmata 0–0 Școlar Reșița.)	
9	Millenium Giarmata	30	12	5	13	40	47	−7	41	
10	Politehnica Timișoara II	30	11	6	13	32	36	−4	39	
11	Nuova Mama Mia Becicherecu Mic	30	10	8	12	41	39	+2	38	
12	Gloria CTP Arad	30	11	3	16	42	49	−7	36	
13	Ineu (R)	30	10	2	18	31	57	−26	32	Relegation to Liga IV
14	Unirea Sânnicolau Mare (R)	30	8	7	15	42	43	−1	31	Relegation to Liga IV
15	Muncitorul Reșița (R)	30	7	4	19	30	65	−35	25	Relegation to Liga IV
16	Retezatul Hațeg (Note: Retezatul Hațeg withdrew during the second half and lost all remaining matches with 0–3.) (R)	30	1	1	28	10	75	−65	4	Relegation to Liga IV
17	Viitorul Sânandrei (Note: Progresul Gătaia and Viitorul Sânandrei withdrew during the first half and all their results were canceld.) (R)	0	0	0	0	0	0	0	0	Withdrew
18	Progresul Gătaia (R)	0	0	0	0	0	0	0	0	Withdrew

Source: FRF (in Romanian)
Rules for classification: 1) Points; 2) Head-to-head points; 3) Head-to-head goal difference; 4) Head-to-head goals scored; 5) Head-to-head away goals scored; 6) Goal difference; 7) Number of goals scored.
(C) Champions; (P) Promoted; (R) Relegated

=== Series VI ===
Pos	Team	Pld	W	D	L	GF	GA	GD	Pts	Promotion or relegation
1	Voința Sibiu (C, P)	34	24	6	4	66	21	+45	78	Promotion to Liga II
2	Seso Câmpia Turzii	34	22	5	7	64	30	+34	71	
3	Cisnădie	34	16	7	11	55	38	+17	55	
4	Zalău	34	16	6	12	45	41	+4	54	
5	Luceafărul Oradea	34	16	5	13	64	40	+24	53 (Note: Luceafărul Oradea: 9 Pts, 8–6; Bihorul Beiuș: 6 Pts, 6–4; Odorheiu Secuiesc: 3 Pts, 5–9.)	
6	Bihorul Beiuș	34	16	5	13	42	40	+2	53	
7	Odorheiu Secuiesc	34	17	2	15	58	51	+7	53	
8	Gaz Metan Mediaș II	34	14	10	10	45	41	+4	52	
9	Unirea Dej	34	14	9	11	49	42	+7	51	
10	ASA Unirea Ungheni	34	13	10	11	51	43	+8	49 (Note: ASA Unirea Ungheni are ahead of Sănătatea Cluj on head-to-head away goals scored; Sănătatea Cluj 2–2 ASA Unirea Ungheni; ASA Unirea Ungheni 1–1 Sănătatea Cluj.)	
11	Sănătatea Cluj	34	14	7	13	47	48	−1	49	
12	Sebeș	34	14	6	14	44	44	0	48	
13	Voința Livezile (R)	34	13	7	14	43	54	−11	46	Relegation to Liga IV
14	Gloria Bistrița II (R)	34	11	5	18	49	51	−2	38	Relegation to Liga IV
15	Avântul Reghin (R)	34	9	10	15	40	46	−6	37	Relegation to Liga IV
16	Zlatna (R)	34	9	9	16	48	63	−15	36	Relegation to Liga IV
17	Marmația Sighetu Marmației (R)	34	6	4	24	29	79	−50	22	Relegation to Liga IV
18	Turul Micula (Note: Turul Micula withdrew during the second half and lost all remaining matches with 0–3.) (R)	34	4	3	27	24	91	−67	15	Relegation to Liga IV

Source: FRF (in Romanian)
Rules for classification: 1) Points; 2) Head-to-head points; 3) Head-to-head goal difference; 4) Head-to-head goals scored; 5) Head-to-head away goals scored; 6) Goal difference; 7) Number of goals scored.
(C) Champions; (P) Promoted; (R) Relegated

== See also ==
- 2009–10 Liga I
- 2009–10 Liga II
- 2009–10 Liga IV
- 2009–10 Cupa României
