= 2010–11 Liga III =

Liga III
- Season: 2010–11
- Country: Romania
- Teams: 96

The 2010–11 Liga III season was the 55th season of the Liga III, the third tier of the Romanian football league system. The season started on 27 August 2010 and ended on 3 June 2011.

The winners of each series were promoted to Liga II, while the bottom three teams in each series were relegated to Liga IV at the end of the season. Additionally, three of the teams placed 13th were also relegated, as determined by a separate standings table based only on the matches played against teams ranked 1st to 12th.

== Team changes ==
=== To Liga III ===
Relegated from Liga II

- FCM Bacău
- Râmnicu Sărat
- Cetatea Suceava
- Drobeta-Turnu Severin

=== From Liga III ===
Promoted to Liga II

- Brăila
- Viitorul Constanța
- Juventus București
- Alro Slatina
- ACU Arad
- Voința Sibiu

- Fortuna Covaci, which had been relegated from Liga II in the previous season, withdrew and enrolled in Liga VI Timiș County.
- Jiul Petroșani, which had been excluded from Liga II in the previous season, was enrolled in Liga IV Hunedoara County.
- CFR Timișoara, which was excluded from Liga II during the previous season, was enrolled in Liga V Timiș County.
- Mureșul Deva, Tricolorul Breaza and Dinamo București II were spared relegation from Liga II due to the withdrawal of Internațional Curtea de Argeș, Baia Mare and Politehnica Iași.

== League tables ==
=== Series I ===
Pos	Team	Pld	W	D	L	GF	GA	GD	Pts	Promotion or relegation
1	FCM Bacău (C, P)	26	23	3	0	78	12	+66	72	Promotion to Liga II
2	SC Bacău	26	19	5	2	57	11	+46	62	
3	Petrotub Roman	26	15	4	7	43	18	+25	49	
4	Pașcani	26	11	5	10	40	41	−1	38	
5	Oțelul Galați II	26	10	6	10	37	31	+6	36 (Note: Oțelul Galați II: 10 pts, 7–4; Panciu: 4 pts, 6–6; Politehnica Galați: 3 pts, 3–6)	
6	Panciu	26	11	3	12	41	33	+8	36	
7	Politehnica Galați	26	11	3	12	28	32	−4	36	
8	Ceahlăul Piatra Neamț II	26	10	3	13	27	36	−9	33	
9	Onești	26	9	5	12	29	37	−8	32	
10	Aerostar Bacău	26	9	4	13	34	45	−11	31	
11	Cetatea Târgu Neamț	26	9	3	14	26	64	−38	30	
12	Rapid CFR Suceava	26	9	2	15	31	38	−7	29	
13	Focșani	26	7	3	16	26	45	−19	24	
14	Luceafărul Mihai Eminescu (R)	26	3	3	20	19	73	−54	12	Relegation to Liga IV
15	Cetatea Suceava (Note: Willy Bacău and Cetatea Suceava withdrew just before the start of the season.) (D)	0	0	0	0	0	0	0	0	Withdrew
16	Willy Bacău (D)	0	0	0	0	0	0	0	0	Withdrew

Source: frf.ro (in Romanian)
Rules for classification: 1st points; 2nd head-to-head points; 3rd head-to-head goal difference; 4th head-to-head goals scored; 5th head-to-head away goals scored; 6th goal difference; 7th number of goals scored
(C) Champions; (D) Disqualified; (P) Promoted; (R) Relegated

=== Series II ===
Pos	Team	Pld	W	D	L	GF	GA	GD	Pts	Promotion or relegation
1	Callatis Mangalia (C, P)	28	21	5	2	64	15	+49	68	Promotion to Liga II
2	Unirea Slobozia	28	21	4	3	75	29	+46	67	
3	Berceni	28	16	4	8	48	29	+19	52	
4	Dunărea Călărași	28	15	5	8	50	34	+16	50	
5	Rapid București II	28	13	5	10	45	27	+18	44	
6	Voluntari	28	11	10	7	33	26	+7	43	
7	Tunari	28	10	6	12	49	52	−3	36 (Note: Tunari: 7 pts, 5–7; Buftea: 6 pts, 9–5; Phoenix Ulmu: 4 pts, 3–5)	
8	Buftea	28	10	6	12	42	48	−6	36	
9	Phoenix Ulmu	28	10	6	12	33	39	−6	36	
10	Comprest GIM București	28	7	11	10	28	41	−13	32 (Note: Eforie 3–0 Comprest GIM București; Comprest GIM București 3–0 Eforie)	
11	Eforie	28	10	2	16	30	49	−19	32	
12	Râmnicu Sărat (Note: Râmnicu Sărat were docked 6 points after not reaching the 25 points minimum margin in the 2009–10 Liga II season.)	28	10	6	12	29	36	−7	30	
13	Partizanul Merei (R)	28	7	3	18	36	64	−28	24	Relegation to Liga IV
14	Spicul Mopan București (Note: Spicul Mopan București withdrew from the championship during the second half and lost all remaining matches with 0–3.) (R)	28	6	5	17	35	56	−21	23	Relegation to Liga IV
15	Stoicescu Buzău (R)	28	3	2	23	22	74	−52	11	Relegation to Liga IV
16	Medgidia (Note: Medgidia withdrew just before the start of the season.) (D)	0	0	0	0	0	0	0	0	Withdrew

Source: frf.ro (in Romanian)
Rules for classification: 1st points; 2nd head-to-head points; 3rd head-to-head goal difference; 4th head-to-head goals scored; 5th head-to-head away goals scored; 6th goal difference; 7th number of goals scored
(C) Champions; (D) Disqualified; (P) Promoted; (R) Relegated

=== Series III ===
Pos	Team	Pld	W	D	L	GF	GA	GD	Pts	Promotion or relegation
1	Chindia Târgoviște (C, P)	30	22	7	1	63	11	+52	73	Promotion to Liga II
2	Chimia Brazi	30	22	5	3	82	23	+59	71	
3	Filipeștii de Pădure	30	14	7	9	40	31	+9	49	
4	Târgoviște	30	14	6	10	37	27	+10	48	
5	Electrosid Titu	30	12	10	8	40	31	+9	46	
6	Viitorul Domnești	30	14	2	14	42	40	+2	44 (Note: Balotești 0–1 Viitorul Domnești; Viitorul Domnești 1–1 Balotești)	
7	Balotești	30	12	8	10	38	33	+5	44	
8	Conpet Ploiești	30	12	7	11	37	37	0	43	
9	Atletic Bradu	30	11	8	11	35	43	−8	41	
10	Girom Albota	30	12	4	14	39	42	−3	40	
11	Inter Clinceni	30	11	6	13	37	42	−5	39	
12	Plopeni	30	8	7	15	32	45	−13	31 (Note: Petrolul Videle 2–1 Plopeni; Plopeni 2–0 Petrolul Videle)	
13	Petrolul Videle	30	8	7	15	30	54	−24	31	
14	Alexandria (R)	30	6	6	18	26	43	−17	24 (Note: Viitorul Chirnogi 0–0 Alexandria; Alexandria 1–0 Viitorul Chirnogi)	Relegation to Liga IV
15	Viitorul Chirnogi (R)	30	5	9	16	24	53	−29	24	Relegation to Liga IV
16	Argeșul Mihăilești (R)	30	4	7	19	15	62	−47	19	Relegation to Liga IV

Source: frf.ro (in Romanian)
Rules for classification: 1st points; 2nd head-to-head points; 3rd head-to-head goal difference; 4th head-to-head goals scored; 5th head-to-head away goals scored; 6th goal difference; 7th number of goals scored
(C) Champions; (P) Promoted; (R) Relegated

=== Series IV ===
Pos	Team	Pld	W	D	L	GF	GA	GD	Pts	Promotion or relegation
1	Slatina (C, P)	26	17	5	4	39	15	+24	56	Promotion to Liga II
2	Piatra Olt	26	15	6	5	48	20	+28	51	
3	Minerul Mătăsari	26	15	3	8	46	26	+20	48	
4	Jiul Rovinari	26	14	5	7	37	18	+19	47	
5	Vișina Nouă	26	12	6	8	48	31	+17	42	
6	Pandurii Târgu Jiu II	26	11	8	7	44	31	+13	41	
7	Minerul Motru	26	11	5	10	33	28	+5	38	
8	Prometeu Craiova	26	10	5	11	43	38	+5	35	
9	Caracal	26	9	6	11	43	31	+12	33	
10	Oltchim Râmnicu Vâlcea	26	9	5	12	34	40	−6	32 (Note: Oltchim Râmnicu Vâlcea 1–0 Dunărea Turris Turnu Măgurele; Dunărea Turris Turnu Măgurele 0–1 Oltchim Râmnicu Vâlcea)	
11	Dunărea Turris Turnu Măgurele	26	9	5	12	29	34	−5	32	
12	Drobeta-Turnu Severin (Note: Drobeta-Turnu Severin were docked 6 points after not reaching the 25 points minimum margin in the 2009–10 Liga II season. In April 2011 the club was dissolved. It lost all its remaining matches with 0–3.) (R)	26	8	5	13	32	54	−22	23	Relegation to Liga IV
13	Ghecon Lăpuşata	26	5	5	16	29	50	−21	20	
14	Triumf Bârca (R)	26	2	1	23	22	111	−89	7	Relegation to Liga IV
15	Progresul Corabia (Note: Progresul Corabia withdrew from the championship during the first half and all their record were canceled.) (D)	0	0	0	0	0	0	0	0	Withdrew

Source: frf.ro (in Romanian)
Rules for classification: 1st points; 2nd head-to-head points; 3rd head-to-head goal difference; 4th head-to-head goals scored; 5th head-to-head away goals scored; 6th goal difference; 7th number of goals scored
(C) Champions; (D) Disqualified; (P) Promoted; (R) Relegated

=== Series V ===
Pos	Team	Pld	W	D	L	GF	GA	GD	Pts	Promotion or relegation
1	Luceafărul Oradea (C, P)	26	18	5	3	54	20	+34	59	Promotion to Liga II
2	Recaș	26	15	4	7	46	30	+16	49	
3	CFR Simeria	26	12	9	5	50	22	+28	45 (Note: CFR Simeria 1–0 Autocatania Caransebeș; Autocatania Caransebeș 0–0 CFR Simeria)	
4	Autocatania Caransebeș	26	13	6	7	35	22	+13	45	
5	Politehnica Timișoara II	26	12	5	9	42	36	+6	41 (Note: Politehnica Timișoara II 1–1 Hunedoara; Hunedoara 2–4 Politehnica Timișoara II)	
6	Hunedoara	26	12	5	9	39	28	+11	41	
7	Național Sebiș	26	9	7	10	23	27	−4	34	
8	Școlar Reșița	26	9	5	12	23	32	−9	32 (Note: Unirea Sânnicolau Mare 0–0 Școlar Reșița; Școlar Reșița 1–0 Unirea Sânnicolau Mare)	
9	Unirea Sânnicolau Mare	26	9	5	12	28	35	−7	32	
10	Millenium Giarmata	26	8	7	11	35	41	−6	31	
11	Gloria CTP Arad	26	7	8	11	31	34	−3	29	
12	Bihorul Beiuș	26	7	5	14	26	53	−27	26	
13	Nuova Mama Mia Becicherecu Mic (R)	26	6	5	15	27	42	−15	23	Relegation to Liga IV
14	Termo Drobeta-Turnu Severin (R)	26	5	4	17	18	55	−37	19	Relegation to Liga IV

Source: frf.ro (in Romanian)
Rules for classification: 1st points; 2nd head-to-head points; 3rd head-to-head goal difference; 4th head-to-head goals scored; 5th head-to-head away goals scored; 6th goal difference; 7th number of goals scored
(C) Champions; (P) Promoted; (R) Relegated

=== Series VI ===
Pos	Team	Pld	W	D	L	GF	GA	GD	Pts	Promotion or relegation
1	Maramureș Universitar Baia Mare (C, P)	28	19	4	5	51	21	+30	61	Promotion to Liga II
2	Seso Câmpia Turzii	28	16	9	3	44	15	+29	57	
3	Cisnădie	28	14	6	8	37	25	+12	48	
4	Corona Brașov	28	12	10	6	33	28	+5	46	
5	Zalău	28	12	7	9	43	37	+6	43	
6	Unirea Tărlungeni	28	12	5	11	31	28	+3	41	
7	ASA Unirea Ungheni	28	11	7	10	37	38	−1	40	
8	Sănătatea Cluj	28	10	7	11	25	40	−15	37	
9	Avântul Reghin	28	8	10	10	24	26	−2	34 (Note: Avântul Reghin 1–0 Unirea Florești; Unirea Florești 3–2 Avântul Reghin)	
10	Unirea Florești	28	9	7	12	32	36	−4	34	
11	Gloria Bistrița II	28	9	5	14	42	48	−6	32	
12	Unirea Dej	28	8	7	13	36	39	−3	31	
13	Gaz Metan Mediaș II	28	8	6	14	25	30	−5	30	
14	Zlatna (R)	28	7	6	15	37	58	−21	27	Relegation to Liga IV
15	Odorheiu Secuiesc (R)	28	4	6	18	20	48	−28	18	Relegation to Liga IV

Source: frf.ro (in Romanian)
Rules for classification: 1st points; 2nd head-to-head points; 3rd head-to-head goal difference; 4th head-to-head goals scored; 5th head-to-head away goals scored; 6th goal difference; 7th number of goals scored
(C) Champions; (P) Promoted; (R) Relegated

== See also ==
- 2010–11 Liga I
- 2010–11 Liga II
- 2010–11 Liga IV
- 2010–11 Cupa României
