= 2008–09 Liga III =

Third tier Romanian football league

Liga III
- Season: 2008–09
- Country: Romania

The 2008–09 Liga III was the 53rd season of Liga III, the third tier of the Romanian football league system. The season began on 15 August 2008 and ended on 5 June 2009.

The winners of each division got promoted to the 2009–10 Liga II season. There were also two playoff tournaments held at neutral venues involving the second placed teams, one with those from series 1, 2 and 3, the other with those from series 4, 5, and 6. The winners of the playoffs also got promoted to the 2009–10 Liga II season. The bottom three from each division were relegated at the end of the season to the Liga IV. From the 15th placed teams, another three were relegated. To determine these teams, separate standings were computed, using only the games played against clubs ranked 1st through 14th.

== League tables ==
=== Seria I ===
| Pos | Team | Pld | W | D | L | GF | GA | GD | Pts | Promotion or relegation |
|---|---|---|---|---|---|---|---|---|---|---|
| 1 | Râmnicu Sărat (C, P) | 34 | 28 | 2 | 4 | 72 | 12 | +60 | 86 | Promotion to Liga II |
| 2 | Oțelul Galați II (Q) | 34 | 23 | 5 | 6 | 97 | 29 | +68 | 74 | Qualification to promotion play-offs |
| 3 | Pambac Bacău | 34 | 23 | 5 | 6 | 72 | 36 | +36 | 74 | |
| 4 | Focșani | 34 | 17 | 10 | 7 | 71 | 36 | +35 | 61 | |
| 5 | Panciu | 34 | 17 | 8 | 9 | 50 | 28 | +22 | 59 | |
| 6 | Laminorul Roman | 34 | 17 | 7 | 10 | 45 | 25 | +20 | 58 | |
| 7 | Aerostar Bacău | 34 | 17 | 6 | 11 | 57 | 26 | +31 | 57 | |
| 8 | Petrolul Berca | 34 | 15 | 8 | 11 | 53 | 33 | +20 | 53 | |
| 9 | Rapid CFR Suceava | 34 | 14 | 9 | 11 | 54 | 32 | +22 | 51 | |
| 10 | Politehnica Iași II | 34 | 15 | 5 | 14 | 56 | 52 | +4 | 50 | |
| 11 | CFR Pașcani | 34 | 13 | 4 | 17 | 39 | 61 | −22 | 43 | |
| 12 | Cetatea Târgu Neamț | 34 | 10 | 10 | 14 | 49 | 51 | −2 | 40 | |
| 13 | Willy Bacău | 34 | 11 | 6 | 17 | 59 | 60 | −1 | 39 | |
| 14 | Ceahlăul Piatra Neamț II | 34 | 10 | 3 | 21 | 47 | 70 | −23 | 33 | |
| 15 | Rarăul Câmpulung Moldovenesc (R) | 34 | 8 | 6 | 20 | 25 | 134 | −109 | 30 | Relegation to Liga IV |
| 16 | Bacău II (Note: Bacău II, Bârlad and Luceafărul Mihai Eminescu withdrew from the championship in the second part and lost all remaining matches with 0–3.) (R) | 32 | 3 | 8 | 21 | 19 | 68 | −49 | 17 | Relegation to Liga IV |
| 17 | Bârlad (R) | 32 | 5 | 2 | 25 | 17 | 69 | −52 | 17 | Relegation to Liga IV |
| 18 | Luceafărul Mihai Eminescu (R) | 32 | 3 | 4 | 25 | 11 | 71 | −60 | 13 | Relegation to Liga IV |

Source: Reference
(C) Champions; (P) Promoted; (Q) Qualified for the phase indicated; (R) Relegated

=== Seria II ===
| Pos | Team | Pld | W | D | L | GF | GA | GD | Pts | Promotion or relegation |
|---|---|---|---|---|---|---|---|---|---|---|
| 1 | Steaua București II (C, P) | 30 | 22 | 7 | 1 | 60 | 16 | +44 | 73 | Promotion to Liga II |
| 2 | Ovidiu (Q) | 30 | 19 | 10 | 1 | 46 | 11 | +35 | 67 | Qualification to promotion play-offs |
| 3 | Rapid București II | 30 | 21 | 4 | 5 | 64 | 31 | +33 | 67 | |
| 4 | Unirea Slobozia | 30 | 19 | 5 | 6 | 64 | 33 | +31 | 62 | |
| 5 | Săgeata Stejaru | 30 | 18 | 6 | 6 | 57 | 29 | +28 | 60 | |
| 6 | Dunărea Călărași | 30 | 17 | 7 | 6 | 47 | 17 | +30 | 58 | |
| 7 | Politehnica Galați | 30 | 12 | 5 | 13 | 49 | 44 | +5 | 41 | |
| 8 | Brăila | 30 | 12 | 4 | 14 | 42 | 45 | −3 | 40 | |
| 9 | Farul Constanța II | 30 | 11 | 6 | 13 | 48 | 42 | +6 | 39 | |
| 10 | Portul Constanța | 30 | 10 | 5 | 15 | 39 | 56 | −17 | 35 | |
| 11 | Eforie | 30 | 9 | 5 | 16 | 31 | 49 | −18 | 32 | |
| 12 | Callatis Mangalia | 30 | 6 | 7 | 17 | 26 | 46 | −20 | 25 | |
| 13 | Rocar București | 30 | 6 | 6 | 18 | 35 | 64 | −29 | 24 | |
| 14 | Medgidia | 30 | 6 | 5 | 19 | 42 | 61 | −19 | 23 | |
| 15 | Viitorul Însurăței (R) | 30 | 6 | 3 | 21 | 24 | 63 | −39 | 21 | Relegation to Liga IV |
| 16 | Inter Gaz București (Note: Inter Gaz București withdrew from the championship in the second part and lost all remaining matches with 0–3.) (R) | 30 | 3 | 1 | 26 | 23 | 90 | −67 | 10 | Relegation to Liga IV |
| 17 | Năvodari (Note: Câmpina and Năvodari withdrew from the championship in the first part and all their results were canceled.) (D) | 0 | 0 | 0 | 0 | 0 | 0 | 0 | 0 | Withdrew |
| 18 | Câmpina (D) | 0 | 0 | 0 | 0 | 0 | 0 | 0 | 0 | Withdrew |

Source: Reference
(C) Champions; (D) Disqualified; (P) Promoted; (Q) Qualified for the phase indicated; (R) Relegated

=== Seria III ===
| Pos | Team | Pld | W | D | L | GF | GA | GD | Pts | Promotion or relegation |
|---|---|---|---|---|---|---|---|---|---|---|
| 1 | Victoria Brănești (C, P) | 32 | 26 | 4 | 2 | 70 | 19 | +51 | 82 | Promotion to Liga II |
| 2 | Tricolorul Breaza (Q, P) | 32 | 25 | 3 | 4 | 76 | 23 | +53 | 78 | Qualification to promotion play-offs |
| 3 | Conpet Ploiești | 32 | 18 | 8 | 6 | 51 | 26 | +25 | 62 | |
| 4 | Petrolistul Kaproni Boldești | 32 | 16 | 10 | 6 | 56 | 24 | +32 | 58 | |
| 5 | Juventus București | 32 | 15 | 10 | 7 | 40 | 24 | +16 | 55 | |
| 6 | Clinceni | 32 | 14 | 8 | 10 | 44 | 34 | +10 | 50 | |
| 7 | Petrolul Videle | 32 | 12 | 9 | 11 | 30 | 29 | +1 | 45 | |
| 8 | Electrosid Titu | 32 | 11 | 9 | 12 | 34 | 29 | +5 | 42 | |
| 9 | Unirea Tărlungeni | 32 | 11 | 7 | 14 | 32 | 40 | −8 | 40 | |
| 10 | Berceni | 32 | 12 | 4 | 16 | 37 | 46 | −9 | 40 | |
| 11 | Chimia Brazi | 32 | 10 | 8 | 14 | 36 | 35 | +1 | 38 | |
| 12 | Filipeștii de Pădure | 32 | 9 | 8 | 15 | 37 | 48 | −11 | 35 | |
| 13 | Predeal | 32 | 7 | 13 | 12 | 31 | 48 | −17 | 34 | |
| 14 | Victoria Bod | 32 | 8 | 7 | 17 | 32 | 55 | −23 | 31 | |
| 15 | Royal Brașov (R) | 32 | 5 | 9 | 18 | 30 | 52 | −22 | 24 | Relegation to Liga IV |
| 16 | Săcele (Note: Săcele and Progresul București II withdrew from the championship in the second part and lost all remaining matches with 0–3.) (R) | 31 | 6 | 5 | 20 | 19 | 66 | −47 | 23 | Relegation to Liga IV |
| 17 | Progresul București II (R) | 31 | 3 | 4 | 24 | 11 | 68 | −57 | 13 | Relegation to Liga IV |
| 18 | Petrolul Ploiești II (Note: Petrolul Ploiești II withdrew from the championship in the first part and all its results were canceled.) (D) | 0 | 0 | 0 | 0 | 0 | 0 | 0 | 0 | Withdrew |

Source: Reference
(C) Champions; (D) Disqualified; (P) Promoted; (Q) Qualified for the phase indicated; (R) Relegated

=== Seria IV ===
| Pos | Team | Pld | W | D | L | GF | GA | GD | Pts | Promotion or relegation |
|---|---|---|---|---|---|---|---|---|---|---|
| 1 | Gaz Metan CFR Craiova (C, P) | 32 | 23 | 5 | 4 | 63 | 24 | +39 | 74 | Promotion to Liga II |
| 2 | Caracal (Q) | 32 | 19 | 8 | 5 | 55 | 24 | +31 | 65 | Qualification to promotion play-offs |
| 3 | Victoria Adunații-Copăceni | 32 | 19 | 6 | 7 | 61 | 31 | +30 | 63 | |
| 4 | Muscelul Câmpulung | 32 | 16 | 7 | 9 | 61 | 36 | +25 | 55 | |
| 5 | Viitorul Pucioasa | 32 | 15 | 8 | 9 | 49 | 41 | +8 | 53 | |
| 6 | Oltchim Râmnicu Vâlcea | 32 | 15 | 6 | 11 | 44 | 34 | +10 | 51 | |
| 7 | Minerul Motru | 32 | 14 | 7 | 11 | 55 | 49 | +6 | 49 | |
| 8 | Alro Slatina | 32 | 13 | 6 | 13 | 36 | 41 | −5 | 45 | |
| 9 | Jiul Rovinari | 32 | 11 | 9 | 12 | 33 | 35 | −2 | 42 | |
| 10 | Armata Craiova | 32 | 11 | 7 | 14 | 35 | 40 | −5 | 40 | |
| 11 | Minerul Jilț Mătăsari | 32 | 11 | 7 | 14 | 33 | 40 | −7 | 40 | |
| 12 | Argeș Pitești II | 32 | 11 | 6 | 15 | 52 | 46 | +6 | 39 | |
| 13 | Prometeu Craiova | 32 | 11 | 5 | 16 | 37 | 42 | −5 | 38 | |
| 14 | Energia Rovinari | 32 | 9 | 7 | 16 | 37 | 54 | −17 | 34 | |
| 15 | Progresul Corabia | 32 | 10 | 3 | 19 | 37 | 53 | −16 | 33 | |
| 16 | Petrom Chimia Craiova (R) | 32 | 9 | 4 | 19 | 28 | 46 | −18 | 31 | Relegation to Liga IV |
| 17 | Balș (R) | 32 | 3 | 3 | 26 | 19 | 99 | −80 | 12 | Relegation to Liga IV |
| 18 | CFR Craiova (Note: CFR Craiova withdrew from the championship in the first part and all its results were canceled.) (D) | 0 | 0 | 0 | 0 | 0 | 0 | 0 | 0 | Withdrew |

Source: Reference
(C) Champions; (D) Disqualified; (P) Promoted; (Q) Qualified for the phase indicated; (R) Relegated

=== Seria V ===
| Pos | Team | Pld | W | D | L | GF | GA | GD | Pts | Promotion or relegation |
|---|---|---|---|---|---|---|---|---|---|---|
| 1 | Fortuna Covaci (C, P) | 30 | 18 | 7 | 5 | 63 | 25 | +38 | 61 | Promotion to Liga II |
| 2 | Ineu (Q) | 30 | 17 | 6 | 7 | 45 | 34 | +11 | 57 | Qualification to promotion play-offs |
| 3 | Minerul Valea Copcii | 30 | 15 | 11 | 4 | 57 | 32 | +25 | 56 | |
| 4 | Viitorul Sânandrei | 30 | 13 | 9 | 8 | 42 | 34 | +8 | 48 | |
| 5 | Building Vânju Mare | 30 | 12 | 9 | 9 | 35 | 28 | +7 | 45 | |
| 6 | CFR Marmosim Simeria | 30 | 14 | 2 | 14 | 52 | 38 | +14 | 44 | |
| 7 | Timișoara II | 30 | 12 | 5 | 13 | 40 | 38 | +2 | 41 | |
| 8 | Național Sebiș | 30 | 10 | 8 | 12 | 42 | 45 | −3 | 38 | |
| 9 | Progresul Gătaia | 30 | 10 | 7 | 13 | 38 | 50 | −12 | 37 | |
| 10 | Alto Gradimento Albina | 30 | 10 | 7 | 13 | 28 | 40 | −12 | 37 | |
| 11 | Gloria CTP Arad | 30 | 10 | 6 | 14 | 42 | 43 | −1 | 36 | |
| 12 | Calor Timișoara | 30 | 10 | 5 | 15 | 36 | 42 | −6 | 35 | |
| 13 | Dacia Orăștie | 30 | 10 | 5 | 15 | 38 | 57 | −19 | 35 | |
| 14 | Nova Mama Mia Becicherecu Mic | 30 | 8 | 10 | 12 | 33 | 43 | −10 | 34 | |
| 15 | Unirea Sânnicolau Mare | 30 | 9 | 7 | 14 | 32 | 52 | −20 | 34 | |
| 16 | Vulcan (R) | 30 | 8 | 4 | 18 | 25 | 47 | −22 | 28 | Relegation to Liga IV |
| 17 | Reșița (Note: Reșița and Corvinul Hunedoara withdrew from the championship in the first part and all their results were canceled.) (D) | 0 | 0 | 0 | 0 | 0 | 0 | 0 | 0 | Withdrew |
| 18 | Corvinul Hunedoara (D) | 0 | 0 | 0 | 0 | 0 | 0 | 0 | 0 | Withdrew |

Source: Reference
(C) Champions; (D) Disqualified; (P) Promoted; (Q) Qualified for the phase indicated; (R) Relegated

=== Seria VI ===
| Pos | Team | Pld | W | D | L | GF | GA | GD | Pts | Promotion or relegation |
|---|---|---|---|---|---|---|---|---|---|---|
| 1 | Baia Mare (C, P) | 34 | 25 | 7 | 2 | 65 | 16 | +49 | 82 | Promotion to Liga II |
| 2 | Silvania Șimleu Silvaniei (Q, P) | 34 | 19 | 7 | 8 | 85 | 45 | +40 | 64 | Qualification to promotion play-offs |
| 3 | CFR Cluj II | 34 | 17 | 7 | 10 | 62 | 43 | +19 | 58 | |
| 4 | Sebeș | 34 | 16 | 8 | 10 | 46 | 33 | +13 | 56 | |
| 5 | Bihorul Beiuș | 34 | 15 | 10 | 9 | 55 | 37 | +18 | 55 | |
| 6 | ASA Unirea Ungheni | 34 | 14 | 9 | 11 | 46 | 54 | −8 | 51 | |
| 7 | Zalău | 34 | 14 | 9 | 11 | 57 | 52 | +5 | 51 | |
| 8 | Avântul Reghin | 34 | 12 | 12 | 10 | 51 | 44 | +7 | 48 | |
| 9 | Sănătatea Cluj | 34 | 13 | 5 | 16 | 47 | 59 | −12 | 44 | |
| 10 | Cisnădie | 34 | 12 | 8 | 14 | 53 | 50 | +3 | 44 | |
| 11 | Gaz Metan Târgu Mureş | 34 | 13 | 4 | 17 | 51 | 58 | −7 | 43 | |
| 12 | Gloria Bistrița II | 34 | 10 | 12 | 12 | 58 | 52 | +6 | 42 | |
| 13 | Seso Iara | 34 | 11 | 9 | 14 | 46 | 47 | −1 | 42 | |
| 14 | Ena Inter Făgăraș | 34 | 11 | 6 | 17 | 53 | 80 | −27 | 39 | |
| 15 | Unirea Dej | 34 | 10 | 8 | 16 | 40 | 55 | −15 | 38 | |
| 16 | Bihor Oradea II (R) | 34 | 9 | 8 | 17 | 38 | 57 | −19 | 35 | Relegation to Liga IV |
| 17 | Liberty Salonta II (R) | 34 | 8 | 8 | 18 | 33 | 55 | −22 | 32 | Relegation to Liga IV |
| 18 | Marmația Sighetu Marmației (R) | 34 | 5 | 7 | 22 | 31 | 80 | −49 | 22 | Relegation to Liga IV |

Source: Reference
(C) Champions; (P) Promoted; (Q) Qualified for the phase indicated; (R) Relegated

== Promotion play-offs ==
=== Group I ===
| Pos | Team | Pld | W | D | L | GF | GA | GD | Pts | Promotion |
|---|---|---|---|---|---|---|---|---|---|---|
| 1 | Tricolorul Breaza (P) | 2 | 2 | 0 | 0 | 6 | 1 | +5 | 4 | Promotion to Liga II |
| 2 | Oțelul Galați II | 2 | 1 | 0 | 1 | 3 | 4 | −1 | 2 | |
| 3 | Ovidiu | 2 | 0 | 0 | 2 | 2 | 6 | −4 | 0 | |

(P) Promoted

| 10 June 2009 | Oțelul Galați II | 0–3 | Tricolorul Breaza | Râmnicu Sărat |
| | | | | Stadium: Municipal Stadium |

| 13 June 2009 | Tricolorul Breaza | 3–1 | Ovidiu | Buzău |
| | | | | Stadium: Municipal Stadium |

| 17 June 2009 | Ovidiu | 1–3 | Oțelul Galați II | Buzău |
| | | | | Stadium: Municipal Stadium |

=== Group II ===
| Pos | Team | Pld | W | D | L | GF | GA | GD | Pts | Promotion |
|---|---|---|---|---|---|---|---|---|---|---|
| 1 | Silvania Șimleu Silvaniei (P) | 2 | 2 | 0 | 0 | 5 | 1 | +4 | 4 | Promotion to Liga II |
| 2 | Ineu | 1 | 0 | 0 | 1 | 1 | 3 | −2 | 0 | |
| 3 | Caracal | 1 | 0 | 0 | 1 | 0 | 2 | −2 | 0 | |

(P) Promoted

| 10 June 2009 | Caracal | 0–2 | Silvania Șimleu Silvaniei | Deva |
| | | | | Stadium: Cetate Stadium |

| 13 June 2009 | Silvania Șimleu Silvaniei | 3–1 | Ineu | Deva |
| | | | | Stadium: Cetate Stadium |

| 17 June 2009 | Ineu | – | Caracal | Deva |
| | | | | Stadium: Cetate Stadium |

== See also ==
- 2008–09 Liga I
- 2008–09 Liga II
- 2008–09 Liga IV
- 2008–09 Cupa României
