= Știința =

Știința means "science" in Romanian. When transliterated from the Moldovan Cyrillic alphabet, it may be spelled Shtiintsa.

The word may refer to:

- Editura Știința, a publishing house in Moldavian SSR and Moldova
- Sports clubs associated with various academic or student bodies:
  - Știința Bacău (disambiguation)
    - FC Știința Bacău, a Romanian football club
    - CS Știința Bacău, a Romanian women handball club
  - HCM Știința Baia Mare, a Romanian women handball club
  - Știința Cluj, a former name for FC Universitatea Cluj
  - Știința Craiova, former name and current nickname for CS Universitatea Craiova
  - Știința, a Romanian student sports club, the precursor of FC Sportul Studenţesc București
  - Știința Timişoara, a former name for FC Politehnica Timișoara
