= Ciprian Străuț =

Romanian footballer

Personal information
- Date of birth: 25 December 1982 (age 43)
- Place of birth: Timișoara, Romania
- Height: 1.83 m (6 ft 0 in)
- Position: Midfielder

Senior career*
| Years | Team | Apps | (Gls) |
| 2008–2009 | CFR Timișoara | ? | (1) |
| 2009 | Bihor Oradea | 7 | (2) |
| 2010 | Fortuna Covaci | 11 | (2) |
| 2010–2011 | Salthill Devon | 26 | (4) |
| 2011 | Arieșul Turda | 13 | (0) |
| 2012–2013 | Voința Sibiu | 12 | (2) |
| 2014 | Bihor Oradea | 27 | (1) |
| 2015 | Național Sebiș | ? | (?) |
- * Club domestic league appearances and goals as of 3 December 2017

Ciprian Străuț (born 25 December 1982) is a Romanian former professional footballer who played as a midfielder.
