= FC Juventus București =

FC Juventus Bucuresti can refer to two Romanian football teams.

- Petrolul Ploiesti – Was named Juventus București during 1924–1947
- SC Juventus Bucureşti – Juventus București to 1992
