= Știința Bacău =

Ştiinţa Bacău may refer to:

- CS Știința Bacău - a men's football club founded in 1965 and dissolved in 1975
- FC Știința Bacău -a men's football club founded in 2008 and dissolved in 2009
- Știința Municipal Bacău - a men's handball club
- CS Știința Bacău - a women's handball club
- CS Știința Bacău - a women's volleyball club
