= Răzvan Riviș =

Romanian footballer

Personal information
- Full name: Răzvan Claudiu Riviș
- Date of birth: 17 January 1989 (age 37)
- Place of birth: Arad, Romania
- Height: 1.73 m (5 ft 8 in)
- Position: Midfielder

Team information
- Current team: UTA Arad

Senior career*
Years	Team	Apps	(Gls)
2006–2009	FC Timişoara	1	(0)
2006–2009	→ FC Timişoara II	23	(2)
2007–2008	→ FCM Reşiţa (loan)	11	(0)
2009–	UTA	0	(0)
- * Club domestic league appearances and goals as of 27 September 2008

Răzvan Riviș (born 17 January 1989 in Arad) is a Romanian football player, currently under contract with UTA Arad.
