= 2007–08 Liga III =

Liga III
- Season: 2007–08
- Country: Romania
- Teams: 108

The 2007–08 Liga III season was the 52nd season of Liga III, the third tier of the Romanian football league system. It was the second in this format (six series of 18 teams each).

The winners of each division got promoted to the 2008-09 Liga II season. There were also two playoff tournaments held at neutral venues involving the second placed teams, one with those from series 1, 2 and 3, the other with those from series 4, 5, and 6. The winners of the playoffs also got promoted to the 2008-09 Liga II season. The bottom three from each division were relegated at the end of the season to the county football leagues (Liga IV). From the 15th placed teams, another three were relegated. To determine these teams, separate standings were computed, using only the games played against clubs ranked 1st through 14th.

== Team changes ==
=== To Liga III ===
Relegated from Liga II

- Cetatea Suceava
- Building Vânju Mare
- Snagov
- Baia Mare
- Chimia Brazi
- Unirea Dej
- Brăila
- Auxerre Lugoj

Promoted from Liga IV

- Filipeștii de Pădure
- Unirea Tărlungeni
- Juventus Bascov
- Târgoviște II
- Turris Turnu Măgurele
- CFR Marmosim Simeria
- CFR Craiova
- Nuova Mama Mia Becicherecu Mic
- Kozara Vințu de Jos
- Bihor II Tileagd
- Turul Micula
- Marmaţia Sighetu Marmaţiei
- Rarăul Câmpulung Moldovenesc
- Gaz Metan Târgu Mureș
- Onix Râmnicu Sărat
- Bârlad
- Cetatea Târgu Neamț
- Bujorul Târgu Bujor
- Ianca
- Abatorul Slobozia
- Medgidia

=== From Liga III ===
Promoted to Liga II

- Unirea Focșani
- Dinamo București II
- Concordia Chiajna
- Severnav Drobeta-Turnu Severin
- Arieșul Turda
- Liberty Salonta
- Inter Gaz București
- Mureșul Deva

Relegated to Liga IV

- Petrolul Moinești
- KSE Târgu Secuiesc
- Roseal Odorheiu Secuiesc
- Fotbal Oil Terminal Constanța
- Petrolul Brăila
- Phoenix Ulmu
- Politehnica Timișoara
- Petrolul Târgoviște
- Avântul Mâneciu
- Flacăra Moreni
- Unirea Mărăcineni
- Petrolul Țicleni
- Minerul Uricani
- Florea Voicilă Alexandria
- Dacia Orăștie
- Someș Gaz Beclean
- Victoria Carei
- Fink Fenster Petrești
- Florența Still Model Odoreu

=== Other changes ===
- EMC Rovinari was renamed Energia Rovinari.
- Timișul Albina was renamed Alto Gradimento Albina.
- FC Ghimbav was renamed Royal Club Ghimbav.
- Astra Ploiești was renamed FC Ploiești.
- Fortuna Covaci took the place of Tim Giroc Timișoara.
- Internațional Curtea de Argeș took the place of Voința Macea.
- Cisnădie took the place of Kozara Vințu de Jos.
- FC Balș took the place of Oltul Slatina.
- Victoria Brănești took the place of Transkurier Sfântu Gheorghe.
- Argeș Pitești II took the place of Juventus Bascov.
- Năvodari took the place of Aurora Mangalia.
- Inter Pantelimon took the place of Târgoviște II.
- Sparta Mediaș withdrew due to financial problems.
- Olimpia Satu Mare was spared from relegation.
- Gaz Metan Podari moved from Podari to Craiova and was renamed Gaz Metan CFR Craiova.
- FC Sibiu, which had been relegated in the previous season, bought the place of Soda Ocna Mureș.
- Maris Târgu Mureș relocated to Ungheni before being absorbed by Unirea Ungheni, which was subsequently renamed ASA Unirea Ungheni.

== League tables ==
=== Seria I ===
Pos	Team	Pld	W	D	L	GF	GA	GD	Pts	Promotion or relegation
1	Cetatea Suceava (C, P)	34	23	7	4	68	16	+52	76	Promotion to Liga II
2	Aerostar Bacău (Q)	34	19	9	6	53	29	+24	66	Qualification to promotion play-offs
3	Politehnica Galați	34	18	9	7	47	23	+24	63	
4	Willy Bacău	34	18	6	10	73	53	+20	60	
5	Politehnica Iași II	34	14	12	8	60	41	+19	54	
6	Bârlad	34	16	3	15	53	53	0	51	
7	Juventus Fălticeni	34	15	4	15	41	52	−11	49	
8	CFR Pașcani	34	15	3	16	49	47	+2	48	
9	Brăila	34	14	8	12	49	43	+6	47 (Note: Three points have been deducted from Brăila because of not reaching the 25 points minimum margin in the last season of Liga II.)	
10	Cetatea Târgu Neamț	34	14	4	16	57	69	−12	46	
11	Ceahlăul Piatra Neamț II	34	13	7	14	42	35	+7	46	
12	Oțelul Galați II	34	14	3	17	47	43	+4	45	
13	Bacău II	34	11	12	11	47	41	+6	45	
14	Pambac Bacău	34	13	6	15	41	45	−4	45	
15	Laminorul Roman	34	13	5	16	47	50	−3	44	
16	Rarăul Câmpulung Moldovenesc (R)	34	10	8	16	36	54	−18	38	Relegation to Liga IV
17	Bujorii Târgu Bujor (R)	34	7	5	22	22	63	−41	26	Relegation to Liga IV
18	NGM Leonard Pașcani (Note: NGM Leonard Pașcani withdrew from the championship in the second part and lost all remaining matches with 0–3.) (R)	34	1	5	28	20	95	−75	8	Relegation to Liga IV

Source: frfotbal.ro
(C) Champions; (P) Promoted; (Q) Qualified for the phase indicated; (R) Relegated

=== Seria II ===
Pos	Team	Pld	W	D	L	GF	GA	GD	Pts	Promotion or relegation
1	Snagov (C, P)	32	26	1	5	82	21	+61	79	Promotion to Liga II
2	Juventus București (Q)	32	25	2	5	80	31	+49	77	Qualification to promotion play-offs
3	Râmnicu Sărat	32	24	4	4	63	31	+32	76	
4	Steaua București II	32	19	5	8	71	34	+37	62	
5	Ovidiu	32	13	10	9	46	33	+13	49	
6	Onix Râmnicu Sărat	32	12	11	9	37	28	+9	47	
7	Rocar București	32	15	2	15	49	44	+5	47	
8	Unirea Slobozia	32	13	5	14	42	49	−7	44	
9	Medgidia	32	11	9	12	48	48	0	42	
10	Portul Constanța	32	11	8	13	38	46	−8	41	
11	Năvodari	32	12	4	16	45	57	−12	40	
12	Callatis Mangalia	32	12	4	16	35	50	−15	40	
13	Dunărea Călărași	32	11	4	17	59	69	−10	37	
14	Viitorul Însurăței	32	7	8	17	28	53	−25	29	
15	Farul Constanța II (R)	32	6	7	19	42	64	−22	25	Relegation to Liga IV
16	Abatorul Slobozia (R)	32	5	4	23	31	85	−54	19	Relegation to Liga IV
17	Aversa București (R)	32	4	4	24	21	74	−53	16	Relegation to Liga IV
18	Ianca (Note: Ianca withdrew from the championship in the first part and all its results were canceled.) (D)	0	0	0	0	0	0	0	0	Withdrew

Source: frfotbal.ro
(C) Champions; (D) Disqualified; (P) Promoted; (Q) Qualified for the phase indicated; (R) Relegated

=== Seria III ===
Pos	Team	Pld	W	D	L	GF	GA	GD	Pts	Promotion or relegation
1	Ploiești (C, P)	34	31	2	1	83	18	+65	95	Promotion to Liga II
2	Buftea (Q, P)	34	24	4	6	67	30	+37	76	Qualification to promotion play-offs
3	Tricolorul Breaza	34	20	6	8	48	32	+16	66	
4	Electrosid Titu	34	20	4	10	52	36	+16	64	
5	Conpet Ploiești	34	15	7	12	56	43	+13	52	
6	Chimia Brazi	34	16	3	15	55	45	+10	51	
7	Rapid București II	34	15	5	14	51	44	+7	50	
8	Victoria Brănești	34	16	2	16	53	56	−3	50	
9	Inter Pantelimon	34	13	10	11	52	54	−2	49	
10	Unirea Tărlungeni	34	14	5	15	35	33	+2	47	
11	Petrolul Ploiești II	34	12	8	14	43	39	+4	44	
12	Dodu Berceni	34	12	7	15	45	51	−6	43	
13	Filipeștii de Pădure	34	10	13	11	33	45	−12	43	
14	Predeal	34	12	5	17	37	44	−7	41	
15	1 Decembrie (R)	34	13	2	19	37	64	−27	41	Relegation to Liga IV
16	Royal Club Ghimbav (Note: Royal Club Ghimbav withdrew from the championship in the second part and lost all remaining matches with 3-0.) (R)	34	7	3	24	31	62	−31	24	Relegation to Liga IV
17	Clinceni (R)	34	7	2	25	26	63	−37	23	Relegation to Liga IV
18	Chitila (R)	34	3	4	27	27	72	−45	13	Relegation to Liga IV

Source: frfotbal.ro
(C) Champions; (P) Promoted; (Q) Qualified for the phase indicated; (R) Relegated

=== Seria IV ===
Pos	Team	Pld	W	D	L	GF	GA	GD	Pts	Promotion or relegation
1	Internațional Curtea de Argeș (C, P)	32	23	3	6	75	25	+50	72	Promotion to Liga II
2	Gaz Metan CFR Craiova (Q)	32	19	8	5	57	29	+28	65	Qualification to promotion play-offs
3	Oltchim Râmnicu Vâlcea	32	16	5	11	48	35	+13	53	
4	Unirea Costești	32	14	6	12	35	32	+3	48	
5	Rova Roșiori	32	14	5	13	35	36	−1	47	
6	Alro Slatina	32	13	7	12	43	36	+7	46	
7	Building Vânju Mare	32	12	10	10	31	27	+4	46	
8	Cisnădie	32	12	10	10	46	34	+12	46	
9	Argeș Pitești II	32	13	4	15	42	51	−9	43	
10	CFR Craiova	32	12	6	14	39	39	0	42	
11	Atletic Sibiu	32	13	3	16	44	51	−7	42	
12	Petrom Chimia Craiova	32	10	10	12	34	51	−17	40	
13	Progresul Corabia	32	10	9	13	40	38	+2	39	
14	Balș	32	10	7	15	37	44	−7	37	
15	Armata Craiova	32	11	3	18	31	50	−19	36	
16	Turris Turnu Măgurele (R)	32	11	3	18	43	65	−22	36	Relegation to Liga IV
17	Dunărea Calafat (R)	32	7	5	20	34	71	−37	26	Relegation to Liga IV
18	Sibiu (Note: Sibiu withdrew from the championship in the first part and all its results were canceled.) (D)	0	0	0	0	0	0	0	0	Withdrew

Source: frfotbal.ro
(C) Champions; (D) Disqualified; (P) Promoted; (Q) Qualified for the phase indicated; (R) Relegated

=== Seria V ===
Pos	Team	Pld	W	D	L	GF	GA	GD	Pts	Promotion or relegation
1	Unirea Sânnicolau Mare (C, P)	32	20	8	4	57	14	+43	68	Promotion to Liga II
2	ACU Arad (Q, P)	32	18	10	4	51	23	+28	64	Qualification to promotion play-offs
3	Minerul Motru	32	17	9	6	56	35	+21	60	
4	Sebeș	32	16	10	6	49	24	+25	58	
5	Minerul Mehedinți	32	14	9	9	38	31	+7	51	
6	Gloria CTP Arad	32	15	5	12	49	48	+1	50	
7	Minerul Jilț Mătăsari	32	13	8	11	45	43	+2	47	
8	Fortuna Covaci	32	13	7	12	39	26	+13	46	
9	Energia Rovinari	32	14	3	15	47	55	−8	45	
10	Alto Gradimento Albina	32	13	3	16	37	33	+4	42	
11	CFR Marmosim Simeria	32	13	2	17	36	53	−17	41	
12	Ineu	32	11	6	15	43	63	−20	39	
13	Calor Timișoara	32	10	7	15	37	34	+3	37	
14	Nova Mama Mia Bechicerecu Mic	32	10	6	16	44	60	−16	36	
15	Vulcan	32	10	6	16	23	32	−9	36	
16	UM Timișoara (R)	32	10	6	16	38	43	−5	36	Relegation to Liga IV
17	Victoria Nădlac (Note: Victoria Nădlac withdrew from the championship in the second part and lost al its remaining matches with 0–3.) (R)	32	1	3	28	12	84	−72	6	Relegation to Liga IV
18	Auxerre Lugoj (Note: Auxerre Lugoj withdrew from the championship in the first part and all its results were canceled.) (D)	0	0	0	0	0	0	0	0	Withdrew

Source: frfotbal.ro
(C) Champions; (D) Disqualified; (P) Promoted; (Q) Qualified for the phase indicated; (R) Relegated

=== Seria VI ===
Pos	Team	Pld	W	D	L	GF	GA	GD	Pts	Promotion or relegation
1	Luceafărul Lotus Băile Felix (C, P)	34	25	4	5	69	34	+35	79	Promotion to Liga II
2	Avântul Reghin (Q)	34	26	1	7	69	27	+42	79	Qualification to promotion play-offs
3	Baia Mare	34	19	7	8	64	26	+38	64	
4	Someșul Satu Mare	34	18	4	12	57	36	+21	58	
5	Trans Sil Târgu Mureș	34	16	8	10	53	29	+24	56	
6	Gloria Bistrița II	34	17	5	12	55	40	+15	56	
7	Gaz Metan Târgu Mureș	34	14	7	13	55	51	+4	49	
8	Unirea Dej	34	12	10	12	40	40	0	46	
9	Lacul Ursu Mobila Sovata	34	12	10	12	43	50	−7	46	
10	Turul Micula	34	13	5	16	53	61	−8	44	
11	ASA Unirea Ungheni	34	12	7	15	42	54	−12	43	
12	Bihorul Beiuș	34	12	7	15	38	45	−7	43	
13	Olimpia Satu Mare (Note: Olimpia Satu Mare was docked 3 points by UEFA in the "Hornyak case".)	34	12	8	14	42	49	−7	41	
14	Sănătatea Cluj	34	11	7	16	45	59	−14	40	
15	Marmația Sighetu Marmației (R)	34	11	5	18	42	59	−17	38	Relegation to Liga IV
16	Inter Blaj (R)	34	10	3	21	39	61	−22	33	Relegation to Liga IV
17	Bihor Oradea II (R)	34	8	7	19	36	64	−28	31	Relegation to Liga IV
18	Universitatea 1919 Cluj-Napoca (R)	34	3	5	26	20	77	−57	14	Relegation to Liga IV

Source: frfotbal.ro
(C) Champions; (P) Promoted; (Q) Qualified for the phase indicated; (R) Relegated

== Promotion play-offs ==
=== Group 1 ===
Pos	Team	Pld	W	D	L	GF	GA	GD	Pts	Promotion or relegation
1	Buftea (P)	2	1	1	0	8	5	+3	4	Promotion to Liga II
2	Juventus București	2	0	2	0	3	3	0	2	
3	Aerostar Bacău	2	0	1	1	4	7	−3	1	

Source: rsssf.com
(P) Promoted

23 May 2008	Buftea	6–3	Aerostar Bacău	Câmpina
	Goșman 8'; Păun 40'; Dorobanțu 64' (pen.); Tutunaru 74'; Novac 81'; Chițu 90+3'		Apetroaiei 50'; Petrea 52'; Carp 85'	Stadium: Poiana

27 May 2008	Juventus București	2–2 (4–2 p)	Buftea	Câmpina
	Bârsan 15' (pen.); Bârsan 34'		Novac 9'; Negrea 58'	Stadium: Poiana

30 May 2008	Aerostar Bacău	1–1	Juventus București	Câmpina
	Petrea 68' (pen.)		Bârsan 59'	Stadium: Poiana

=== Group 2 ===
Pos	Team	Pld	W	D	L	GF	GA	GD	Pts	Promotion or relegation
1	ACU Arad (P)	2	1	1	0	5	1	+4	4	Promotion to Liga II
2	Avântul Reghin	2	1	1	0	2	0	+2	4	
3	Gaz Metan CFR Craiova	2	0	0	2	1	7	−6	0	

Source: rsssf.com
(P) Promoted

23 May 2008	Avântul Reghin	2–0	Gaz Metan CFR Craiova	Alba Iulia
	Aștilean 13'; Luca 48'			Stadium: Victoria-Cetate

27 May 2008	ACU Arad	0–0 (4–3 p)	Avântul Reghin	Alba Iulia
				Stadium: Victoria-Cetate

30 May 2008	Gaz Metan CFR Craiova	1–5	ACU Arad	Alba Iulia
	Buznărescu 68'		Balaci 4'; Lung 14'; Mițiți 22'; Țurcaș 35'; Talpaș 65'	Stadium: Victoria-Cetate

== See also ==
- 2007–08 Liga I
- 2007–08 Liga II
- 2007–08 Liga IV
- 2007–08 Cupa României
