= Râmnicu Sărat Municipal Stadium =

Romanian stadium

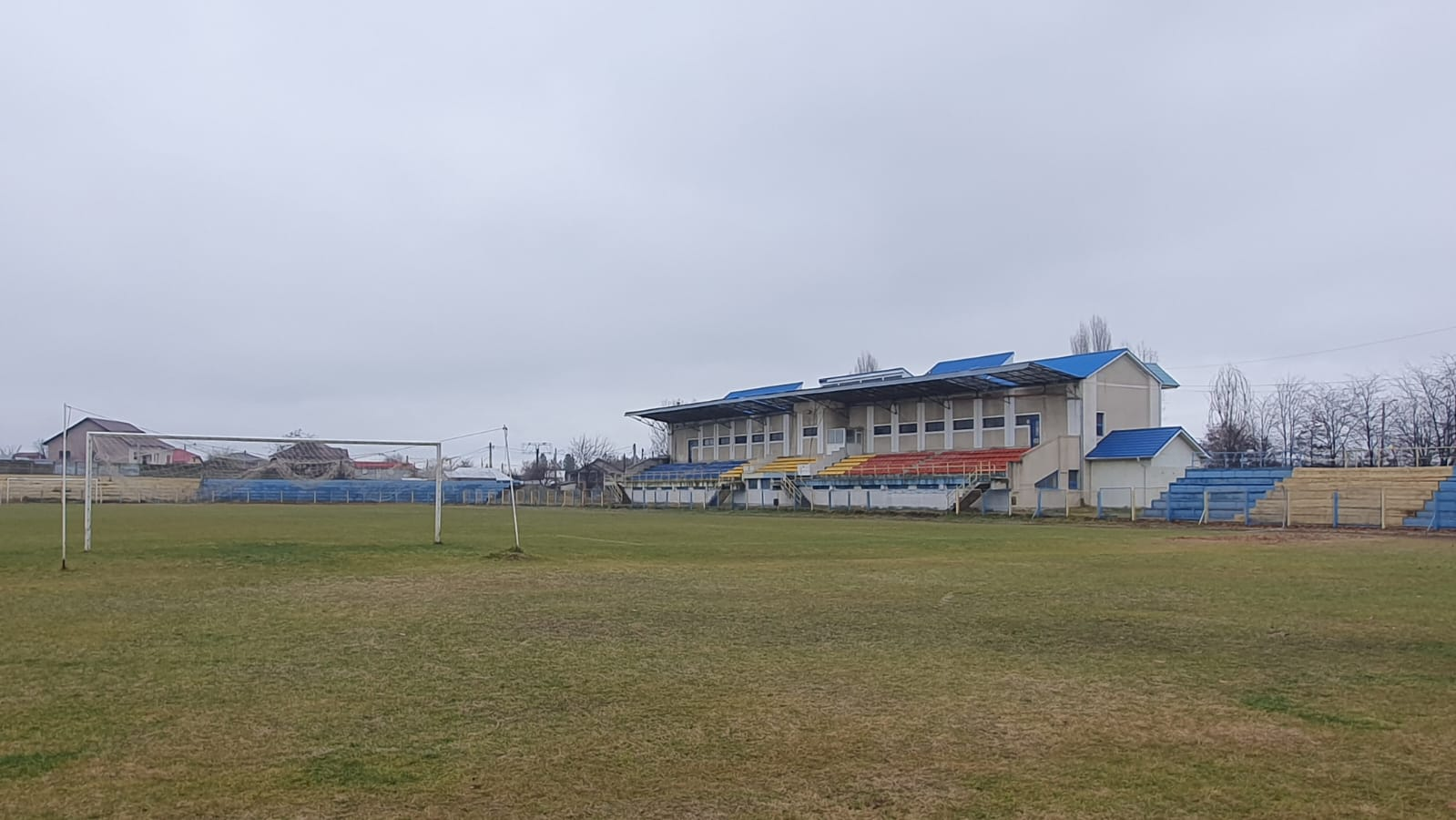
- Interactive map of Râmnicu Sărat Municipal Stadium
- Former names: Olimpia Stadium
- Address: Str. Mihai Eminescu, nr. 2
- Location: Râmnicu Sărat, Romania
- Coordinates: 45°22′36.8″N 27°1′52″E
- Owner: Municipality of Râmnicu Sărat
- Operator: Râmnicu Sărat
- Capacity: 6,500 (500 seated)
- Surface: Grass

Construction
- Opened: 1960s
- Renovated: 2009

Tenant
- Râmnicu Sărat (1966–Present)

The Râmnicu Sărat Municipal Stadium is a multi-use stadium in Râmnicu Sărat, Romania. It is the home ground of CSM Râmnicu Sărat and holds 6,500 people.
