= CSM Râmnicu Sărat =

Romanian professional football club

- Full name: Club Sportiv Municipal; Râmnicu Sărat
- Nicknames: Râmnicenii (The People of Râmnicu Sărat)
- Short name: CSM
- Founded: 1950; 76 years ago as Spartac Râmnicu Sărat
- Ground: Municipal
- Capacity: 3,000
- Owner: Râmnicu Sărat Municipality
- Chairman: Gheorghe Lăpuște
- Manager: Marius Tîrîlă
- League: Liga III
- 2025–26: Liga III, Seria II, 11th
Home colours	Away colours

Club Sportiv Municipal Râmnicu Sărat (Romanian pronunciation: [ˌklub sporˈtiv ˈrɨmniku ˌrɨmniku səˈrat]), commonly known as CSM Râmnicu Sărat or Râmnicu Sărat, is a Romanian professional football team based in Râmnicu Sărat, Buzău County, currently competes in Liga III, the third level of the Romanian football.

The team has been known over time by various names, including Spartac, Flamura Roșie, Voința, Progresul, Ferodoul, Acvaterm, and Olimpia, and plays its home matches at Râmnicu Sărat Municipal Stadium.

== History ==
In the 1980–81 season, Râmnicenii finished 9th in Series III of Divizia C and reached the Round of 32 in the Cupa României, being eliminated 1–2 by first-division side FC Olt at the Municipal Stadium in Râmnicu Sărat. The lineup for Olimpia in that match was: Arghir — Soare, Androne, Petrache, Prunică — Duță, Zamfir, Pușcă — Preda (66' Buzăianu), Morogan, Oprea.

In 1981, the team was taken over by the local Enterprise of Gaskets, Brakes, and Sealing and was renamed Ferodoul Râmnicu Sărat. It competed in Series III and finished in 5th place during the 1981–82 campaign. In 1982, the team reverted to the name Olimpia, finished 1st in Series III of Divizia C in the 1982–83 season, and earned promotion to Divizia B. The squad, coached by Marin Mustață, included T. Lăptoiu, Bîndar, Arghir, C. Roșca, Soare, Dumitrescu, Dorobanțu, Pătărescu, Bologan, M. Nicu, Gh. Dobre, Toma, G. Roșu, V. Roșu, Băbeanu, Bodan, Pușcă, Oprea, Țone, Tuculan, Preda, and Apostol.

Former logo, as Olimpia.

In the following seasons, Olimpia was assigned to Series I in Divizia B, ranking 12th in the 1983–84 campaign under Marin Mustață for the first seven rounds and Cornel Negoescu for the remainder of the season, 7th in the 1984–85 season, 12th in the 1985–86 season, 10th in the 1986–87 season, and 17th in the 1987–88 season, resulting in relegation back to Divizia C.

In the 1988–89 season, under the guidance of Ion Moldovan, Olimpia won Series III of Divizia C, finishing eleven points ahead of the 2nd-placed team and returning to the second division after just one year. The squad included the following players: Cristea, Stoian, Nițu, Cerbu, Stanciu, Aramă, Ioniță, Trocea, Marin Roșu, Roșca, Gabriel Roșu, Mitracu, Stănițel, Ion Cățoi, Răduță, Dulea, Badea, Tigoianu (15 goals), Răileanu, Petre, and Stănescu.

Back in Divizia B, Olimpia competed for three seasons, finishing 6th in the 1989–90 season, 12th in the 1990–91 season, and 14th in the 1991–92 season, when it was relegated to the third division due to the second division being reduced from three series to only two series of eighteen teams. The decline continued in the 1992–93 season of the third division, as Olimpia finished 18th out of 20 in Series II and was relegated to the fourth division.

In the fourth division, Olimpia spent five consecutive seasons, winning the Buzău County Championship twice but failing to secure promotion each time. In the 1994–95 season, the play-off was lost against Prod Câmpineanca, the Vrancea County winners, with scores of 1–2 and 2–3. In the 1996–97 season, although a 2–1 victory after extra time was achieved against Textila Prejmer, the Brașov County winners, promotion was missed, as the team did not rank among the top sixteen in the special standings of the best-performing teams in the promotion play-off.

In 1998, the team was renamed Acvaterm Râmnicu Sărat after being taken over by the municipally owned public utility company. It took the place of newly promoted Divizia C side Hidroconcas Buzău and went on to finish 5th in Series I of the third tier in the 1998–99 season.

In the following season, Avaterm faced relegation after finishing 16th out of 18 in Series II, but remained in Divizia C after it bought the place of newly promoted Aromet Poșta Câlnău. The team then reverted to the Olimpia name and competed in Series II of the third division, finishing 8th in the 2000–01 season. Râmnicenii competed in the following five seasons in Series II of Divizia C, ranking 12th in both the 2001–02 and 2002–03 campaigns, 4th in the 2003–04 season, and 7th in the 2004–05 season.

In 2005, the team was taken over by the Municipality of Râmnicu Sărat and renamed Club Sportiv Municipal (CSM) Râmnicu Sărat. The impact was quickly noticeable, as results began to improve: the team finished 2nd in Series II in the 2005–06 season, followed by a 6th-place finish the next year in Series I. In the 2007–08 campaign, CSM placed 3rd in Series II, just one point behind Juventus București and the promotion play-off spot.

Promotion to the second division was finally secured in the 2008–09 season, when CSM comfortably won Series I, finishing twelve points ahead of 2nd-placed Oțelul Galați II. In Liga II, the team was coached by Mihai Ciobanu in the first part of the season and by Cătălin Cighir in the second, and struggled to cope with the demands of the competition and ended the 2009–10 campaign in 17th place, suffering relegation after just one year. Deducted six points for failing to reach the twenty-five-point minimum in the previous season, Râmnicenii, led by Cighir in the first half and Dan Paveliuc in the second, went on to finish 12th in the 2010–11 season, in Series II of Liga III.

After a poor start to the 2011–12 season, Marian Roșu replaced Dan Paveliuc at the beginning of October, guiding the team to a 4th-place finish in Series I. Roșu left CSM Râmnicu Sărat exactly a year later and was replaced by players Marius Tîrîlă and Sorin Bodoc as caretakers, before former coach Dan Paveliuc returned to take charge. Although the team finished 4th in Series II of Liga III in the 2012–13 season, it withdrew from the championship due to financial reasons and continued to compete in Liga IV – Buzău County, after reorganizing administratively and being renamed Olimpia. Under Paveliuc’s leadership, the team finished the 2013–14 season in 4th place.

Under the management of player-coach Marius Tîrîlă, Olimpia earned promotion at the end of the 2014–15 season, after winning Liga IV – Buzău County and defeating Avântul Valea Mărului, the Galați County champions, in the promotion play-off: 1–1 at the Municipal Stadium in Râmnicu Sărat and 6–0 at the Prof. Costică Popovici Stadium in Valea Mărului. Back in Liga III, Olimpia finished the 2015–16 season in 2nd place in Series I, seven points behind Sepsi OSK, and ranked 9th in the following campaign.

In the summer of 2017, the team reorganized once again, returning to the name CSM Râmnicu Sărat, being taken over by the Municipality and reintegrated into the sports club of the same name, finishing the 2017–18 season once again in 9th place.

The 2018–19 campaign proved very disappointing for CSM, as the team finished in 14th place. Already relegated to the fourth division, player-coach Marius Tîrîlă was replaced by Dan Paveliuc four rounds before the end of the season.

In the 2019–20 season, which was suspended in March 2020 due to the COVID-19 pandemic, CSM Râmnicu Sărat was in 1st place and was declared Buzău County champions, thus qualifying for the promotion play-off to Liga III. Competing in Group B of Region 7 (South–East) at Oțelul Stadium in Galați, the team, led by Tănase Lăptoiu, benefited from the withdrawal of Pescărușul Sarichioi, the Tulcea County champions. However, CSM Râmnicu Sărat lost to Gloria Albești, the Constanța County champions, after a 0–0 draw and a 3–4 defeat in the penalty shootout, finishing 2nd. Despite this, Râmnicenii promoted to Liga III, ranking 3rd in the special table based on the second-placed teams from the fourteen promotion groups.

CSM Râmnicu Sărat concluded their first season back in Liga III by finishing 4th in Series II, with Tănase Lăptoiu on the bench. Marius Vișan started the 2021–22 campaign as head coach but left in April 2022, being replaced by Marius Tîrîlă for the final part of the season. The team eventually finished 7th in Series II, both at the end of the regular season and after the play-out round.

Tîrîlă led CSM Râmnicu Sărat in the following season, finishing 1st in the regular season of Series II and 2nd after the play-off round of the series, thus qualifying for the first round of the promotion play-off, where the team lost to Foresta Suceava, 1–1 at home and 0–2 in Suceava. In the 2023–24 season, Râmnicenii finished 5th in the regular season and 1st in the play-out round of Series II, finishing 5th overall.

Chronology of names
Names	PerioD
Spartac Râmnicu Sărat	1950–1953
Flamura Roșie Râmnicu Sărat	1954–1955
Voința Râmnicu Sărat	1956–1964
Progresul Râmnicu Sărat	1964–1969
Olimpia Râmnicu Sărat	1969–1981
Ferodoul Râmnicu Sărat	1981–1982
Olimpia Râmnicu Sărat	1982–1998
Acvaterm Râmnicu Sărat	1998–2000
Olimpia Râmnicu Sărat	2000–2005
CSM Râmnicu Sărat	2005–2013
Olimpia Râmnicu Sărat	2013–2017
CSM Râmnicu Sărat	2017–present

== Honours ==
Liga III

- Winners (4): 1975–76, 1982–83, 1988–89, 2008–09
- Runners-up (3): 2005–06, 2015–16, 2022–23

Liga IV – Buzău County

- Winners (5): 1969–70, 1994–95, 1996–97, 2014–15, 2019–20
- Runners-up (1): 1968–69

== Players ==
=== First-team squad ===
As of 10 September 2024

Note: Flags indicate national team as defined under FIFA eligibility rules; some limited exceptions apply. Players may hold more than one non-FIFA nationality.

No.	Pos.	Nation	Player
1	GK	ROU	Rareș Șerban
2	MF	ROU	Dănuț Oprea (Vice-Captain)
3	MF	ROU	Mihăiță Trandafir
4	MF	CMR	Alexandre Song
5	DF	ROU	Matteo Tănăsele
6	DF	ROU	Marius Ioniță
7	MF	ROU	Florin Alexandru
8	MF	ROU	Bogdan Danciu (Captain)
9	FW	ROU	Dănuț Bătrînu
10	MF	ROU	Andrei Ignat
11	MF	ROU	Mădălin Socol

No.	Pos.	Nation	Player
12	GK	ROU	George Onel
15	MF	ROU	Cosmin Ionescu
16	MF	ROU	Ionuț Legănuț
17	MF	ROU	Ionuț Dima
18	MF	ROU	Claudiu Ionescu-Racovițeanu
19	MF	ROU	Mario Micu
20	MF	ROU	Silvian Calotă
23	MF	ROU	Alessio Mocanu
30	MF	ROU	Iasmin Puiu
33	GK	ROU	Costin Râpeanu
80	MF	ROU	Robert Tănase

=== Out on loan ===
Note: Flags indicate national team as defined under FIFA eligibility rules; some limited exceptions apply. Players may hold more than one non-FIFA nationality.

No. / Pos. / Nation / Player	No. / Pos. / Nation / Player

== Club Officials ==
=== Board of directors ===
Role	Name
Owner	(Romania) Râmnicu Sărat Municipality
President	(Romania) Gheorghe Lăpuște
Sporting director	(Romania) Costică Roșca
Team manager	(Romania) Iulian Grigoraș

=== Current technical staff ===
Role	Name
Manager	(Romania) Marius Tărîlă
Assistant managers	(Romania) Dănuț Paveliuc (Romania) Viorel Bodan
Goalkeeping coach	(Romania) Ionuț Popa
Club doctor	(Romania) Marius Roșca

== Former managers ==
- (Romania) Alexandru Karikaș (1977–1978)
- (Romania) Ion Moldovan (1987–1990)
- (Romania) Cornel Negoescu
- (Romania) Mihai Ciobanu
- (Romania) Dan Paveliuc
- (Romania) Marian Roșu

== League history ==
Season	Tier	Division	Place	Notes	Cupa României
2026–27	3	Liga III	TBD		First Round
2025–26	3	Liga III (Seria II)	11th	spared from relegation	Third round
2024–25	3	Liga III (Seria II)	6th		Second round
2023–24	3	Liga III (Seria II)	5th		Second round
2022–23	3	Liga III (Seria II)	2nd		First round
2021–22	3	Liga III (Seria II)	7th		Second round
2020–21	3	Liga III (Seria II)	4th		First round
2019–20	4	Liga IV (BZ)	1st (C, P)	Promoted	First round
2018–19	3	Liga III (Seria I)	14th (R)	Relegated	Second round
2017–18	3	Liga III (Seria II)	9th		Third round
2016–17	3	Liga III (Seria I)	9th		Third round
2015–16	3	Liga III (Seria I)	2nd		
2014–15	4	Liga IV (BZ)	1st (C, P)	Promoted	
2013–14	4	Liga IV (BZ)	4th		
2012–13	3	Liga III (Seria II)	4th (R)	Self-relegated	
2011–12	3	Liga III (Seria I)	4th		

Season	Tier	Division	Place	Notes	Cupa României
2010–11	3	Liga III (Seria II)	12th		
2009–10	2	Liga II (Seria I)	17th (R)	Relegated	
2008–09	3	Liga III (Seria I)	1st (C, P)	Promoted	
2007–08	3	Liga III (Seria II)	3rd		
2006–07	3	Liga III (Seria I)	6th		
2005–06	3	Divizia C (Seria II)	2nd		
2004–05	3	Divizia C (Seria II)	7th		
2003–04	3	Divizia C (Seria II)	4th		
2002–03	3	Divizia C (Seria II)	12th		
2001–02	3	Divizia C (Seria II)	12th		
2000–01	3	Divizia C (Seria II)	8th		
1999–00	3	Divizia C (Seria II)	16th		
1998–99	3	Divizia C (Seria I)	5th		
1992–93	3	Divizia C (Seria II)	18th (R)	Relegated	
1991–92	2	Divizia B (Seria I)	14th (R)	Relegated	
1990–91	2	Divizia B (Seria I)	12th		
1989–90	2	Divizia B (Seria I)	6th		
