= Cristinel Gafița =

Romanian footballer

Cristinel Gafiţa
Personal information
- Date of birth: 14 June 1987 (age 39)
- Place of birth: Vicovu de Jos, Romania
- Height: 1.74 m (5 ft 8 1/2 in)
- Position: Forward

Youth career
- 2005–2007: Ceahlăul Piatra Neamţ

Senior career*
| Years | Team | Apps | (Gls) |
| 2006–2012 | Ceahlăul Piatra Neamţ | 95 | (33) |
| 2013 | Botoșani | 5 | (0) |
| 2013–2014 | Rapid CFR Suceava | 11 | (1) |
| 2014–2015 | Caransebeș | 6 | (0) |
| Total | | 117 | (34) |
- * Club domestic league appearances and goals as of 25 February 2018

Cristinel Gafiţa (born 14 June 1987) is a Romanian former footballer. He played for the first team of Ceahlăul Piatra Neamţ for the first time in 2006.
