= Stadionul Cetate (Deva) =

Stadium in Romania

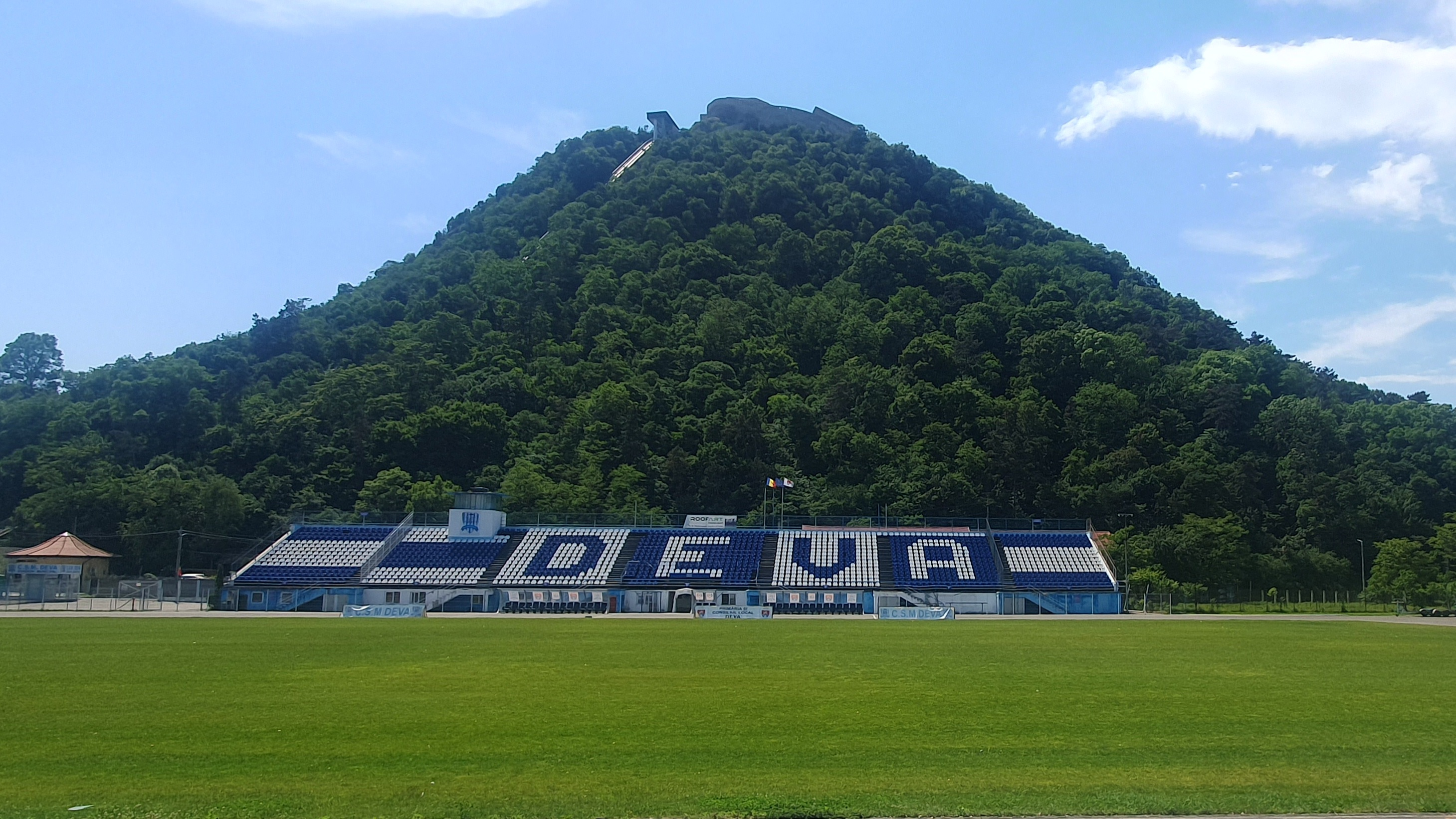
- Interactive map of Stadionul Cetate
- Address: Str. Stadion
- Location: Deva, Romania
- Coordinates: 45°53′23.31″N 22°54′1.81″E
- Owner: Municipality of Deva
- Operator: Cetate Deva
- Capacity: 4,000 seated
- Surface: Grass

Construction
- Opened: 1960s
- Renovated: 2007

Tenant
- Cetate Deva (1960–present)

Stadionul Cetate is a multi-use stadium in Deva, Romania. It is currently used mostly for football matches and is the home ground of Cetate Deva. The stadium was opened in the 1960s and holds 4,000 seats. Cetate Stadium is ranked 3rd in Hunedoara County, by capacity and is well known in Romania for its special location, right at the foot of the hill on which the Deva Citadel is located.
