= Liga III =

Association football league in Romania

- Organising body: Romanian Football Federation
- Founded: 1936
- Country: Romania
- Number of clubs: 96 (8×12)
- Level on pyramid: 3
- Promotion to: Liga II
- Relegation to: Liga IV
- Domestic cup(s): Cupa României; Supercupa României
- Current champions: Cetatea Suceava; Ștefănești; Râmnicu Vâlcea; Știința Poli Timișoara (2025–26)
- Website: hailafotbal.ro
- Current: 2026–27 Liga III

Liga 3, commonly styled as Liga III, is the third level of the Romanian football league system. Since April 2026, the competition has been officially known as Superscore Liga 3 under a naming-rights agreement between the Romanian Football Federation (FRF) and Superscore. The league was founded in 1936 as Divizia C. During the 1992 reorganisation of the Romanian league system, the third tier was renamed Divizia B; the traditional divisional names were restored in 1997. The competition has been called Liga III since the 2006–07 season.

== History ==
Divizia C was established in 1936 as a national third tier between Divizia B and the regional championships. For much of its early history, however, the competition was not held on a continuous basis and its format changed repeatedly.

Until 1963, the competition was held irregularly. After the first two seasons (1936–37 and 1937–38), Divizia C was discontinued and resumed only for the 1946–47 season. Following another interruption, a new attempt was made in 1948–49, but the season was abandoned midway.

The fourth edition took place in 1956, followed by the 1957–58 and 1958–59 seasons. After another four-year hiatus, the competition returned in 1963–64 with four geographical series—East, West, South and North—of twelve teams each. The series were expanded to fourteen teams in 1964–65, and the competition has been held every season since 1963–64, although its structure has changed numerous times.

From 1968–69, the league was expanded to eight geographical series of sixteen teams. It was reorganised again in 1971–72 into twelve series of fourteen teams, with the series increasing to sixteen teams from 1973–74. That structure remained in place until the 1992 reorganisation, when the third tier was reduced to four series of twenty teams and renamed Divizia B.

In the 2020–21 season, Liga III was reorganised from five to ten geographically based series of ten teams each during the COVID-19 pandemic period. Each series was played in a double round-robin format. At the end of the regular season, a promotion play-off system was introduced in two rounds, with teams from paired series (1–2, 3–4, 5–6, 7–8, 9–10) competing to determine the five teams promoted to Liga II.

From the 2021–22 season, the competition was played in three stages. After an 18-match regular season, the top four teams in each series entered a play-off and the remaining six entered a play-out. The top two teams from each series play-off then advanced to two rounds of inter-series promotion play-offs, which produced five promoted teams.

The same basic structure remained in use through 2024–25. The 2023–24 season was an exception in that six teams were promoted because Liga II was being expanded to 22 clubs. Five places were awarded through the normal promotion play-offs, while the sixth was decided by an additional mini-tournament involving four of the five teams that lost in the promotion-play-off finals. In 2024–25, the number of promotion places returned to five.

== Current format ==
Beginning with the 2025–26 season, Liga III was reduced from 100 to 96 teams and reorganised into eight geographically based series of twelve clubs. The competition is played in two main phases: the regular season, followed by separate play-off and play-out competitions. The same format was retained for the 2026–27 season.

During the regular season, the twelve teams in each series play one another home and away, for a total of 22 matches per club. The top four teams advance to the promotion play-offs, while the teams placed 5th–12th enter the play-outs.

For the play-offs, neighbouring regular-season series are paired (1–2, 3–4, 5–6 and 7–8), creating four eight-team groups. Clubs carry forward only the points earned during the regular season against the other teams from their original series that also qualified for the play-off. They then play home and away against the four qualifiers from the paired series, adding eight matches. The winner of each play-off group is promoted directly to Liga II. The four runners-up enter a single-match knockout tournament, consisting of two semi-finals and a final, to determine the fifth promoted team.

In each play-out, the teams placed 5th–12th in the regular season keep all of their accumulated points and play a single round-robin of seven additional matches. The bottom two teams in each of the eight play-out groups are relegated to Liga IV. Five more teams are relegated from among the eight clubs finishing sixth in their respective play-out groups, based on an overall ranking.

== List of champions and promoted teams ==
=== Divizia C (1974–1992) ===
The following tables list the series winners from the 1974–75 season onward; earlier editions were played under several different formats.

Season	Seria I	Seria II	Seria III	Seria IV	Seria V	Seria VI	Seria VII	Seria VIII	Seria IX	Seria X	Seria XI	Seria XII
1974–75	Botoșani	Viitorul Vaslui	Prahova Ploiești	Cimentul Medgidia	Dunărea Giurgiu	Chimia Turnu Măgurele	Minerul Motru	Unirea Tomnatic	Dacia Orăștie	CIL Sighet	Gloria Bistrița	Nitramonia Făgăraș
1975–76	Minerul Gura Humorului	Relonul Săvinești	Olimpia Râmnicu Sărat	Portul Constanța	Tehnometal București	Flacăra-Automecanica Moreni	Minerul Lupeni	Aurul Brad	Armătura Zalău	Minerul Cavnic	Chimica Târnăveni	Oltul Sfântu Gheorghe
1976–77	Botoșani	Viitorul Vaslui	Carpați Sinaia	Tulcea	Autobuzul București	Muscelul Câmpulung	Pandurii Târgu Jiu	Minerul Moldova Nouă	Victoria Carei	Avântul Reghin	ICIM Brașov	Gaz Metan Mediaș
1977–78	Minerul Gura Humorului	Constructorul Iași	Progresul Brăila	Chimia Brazi	ȘN Oltenița	Viitorul Scornicești	Drobeta-Turnu Severin	Minerul Anina	Înfrățirea Oradea	Minerul Cavnic	Poiana Câmpina	IS Câmpia Turzii
1978–79	Botoșani	Energia Gheorghe Gheorghiu-Dej	Unirea Focșani	Cimentul Medgidia	Mecanică Fină București	Flacăra-Automecanica Moreni	Pandurii Târgu Jiu	Unirea Alba Iulia	Strungul Arad	Someșul Satu Mare	Carpați Mârșa	Viitorul Gheorgheni
1979–80	Ceahlăul Piatra Neamț	Borzești	CSU Galați	IMU Medgidia	Sirena București	ROVA Roșiori	Minerul Lupeni	CFR Timișoara	Rapid Arad	CIL Sighet	Metalul Aiud	Oltul Sfântu Gheorghe
1980–81	Constructorul Iași	Relonul Săvinești	Oțelul Galați	Dunărea Călărași	Automatica București	Energia Slatina	Drobeta-Turnu Severin	Strungul Arad	Someșul Satu Mare	Minerul Ilba-Seini	Carpați Mârșa	ICIM Brașov
1981–82	Minerul Gura Humorului	Borzești	Prahova Ploiești	Metalosport Galați	Dinamo Victoria București	ROVA Roșiori	Minerul Motru	Metalurgistul Cugir	Gloria Reșița	Armătura Zalău	IS Câmpia Turzii	Precizia Săcele
1982–83	Chimia Fălticeni	Partizanul Bacău	Olimpia Râmnicu Sărat	Unirea Slobozia	Metalul Plopeni	Chimia Turnu Măgurele	Constructorul TCI Craiova	CFR Caransebeș	Minerul Lupeni	CFR Cluj-Napoca	Avântul Reghin	Nitramonia Făgăraș
1983–84	CFR Pașcani	FEPA 74 Bârlad	Metalul Mangalia	AS Mizil	Mecanică Fină București	Flacăra-Automecanica Moreni	Drobeta-Turnu Severin	Mureșul Deva	Strungul Arad	Sticla Arieșul Turda	Unirea Alba Iulia	Tractorul Brașov
1984–85	Minerul Vatra Dornei	Aripile Bacău	Delta Tulcea	Dunărea Călărași	ICSIM București	Muscelul Câmpulung	Electroputere Craiova	Metalul Bocșa	Înfrățirea Oradea	CIL Sighet	Mecanica Orăștie	ICIM Brașov
1985–86	Minerul Gura Humorului	Unirea Dinamo Focșani	FEPA 74 Bârlad	Unirea Slobozia	Autobuzul București	ROVA Roșiori	Gloria Pandurii Târgu Jiu	Minerul Paroșeni	Steaua CFR Cluj-Napoca	Unio Satu Mare	Inter Sibiu	Poiana Câmpina
1986–87	Siretul Pașcani	Inter Vaslui	Petrolul Ianca	Sportul 30 Decembrie	Metalul București	Sportul Muncitoresc Caracal	Gloria Reșița	Progresul Timișoara	Sticla Arieșul Turda	Minerul Baia Sprie	Electromureș Târgu Mureș	Metalul Plopeni
1987–88	ASA Explorări Câmpulung-Moldovenesc	Aripile Victoria Bacău	Metalul Mangalia	Dunărea Călărași	Metalul Mija	Dacia Pitești	Minerul Motru	CFR Timișoara	Minerul Cavnic	Unirea Alba Iulia	Avântul Reghin	Poiana Câmpina
1988–89	Foresta Fălticeni	Viitorul Vaslui	Olimpia Râmnicu Sărat	Unirea Slobozia	Autobuzul București	Mecanică Fină București	Constructorul TCI Craiova	Vagonul Arad	Mureșul Explorări Deva	IMASA Sfântu Gheorghe	Steaua CFR Cluj-Napoca	Someșul Satu Mare
1989–90	Fortus Iași	Borzești	Gloria CFR Galați	Callatis Mangalia	Progresul București	Electroputere Craiova	Șoimii IPA Sibiu	Montana Sinaia	Vulturii Lugoj	Aurul Brad	Metalurgistul Cugir	CIL Sighet
1990–91	Relonul Săvinești	FEPA 74 Bârlad	Petrolul Ianca	Portul Constanța	Metalul București	Metrom Brașov	Olt Scornicești	Jiul IEELIF Craiova	Electromureș Târgu Mureș	Minerul Cavnic	CFR Cluj-Napoca	UM Timișoara
1991–92	CFR Pașcani	Cotidianul Bacău	Delta Tulcea	Metalul Plopeni	Electrica Fieni	Dunărea Călărași	Dacia Pitești	Mureșul Toplița	Minerul Mătăsari	Arsenal Reșița	Șoimii Lipova	Cuprom Baia Mare
1991–92	Following the reorganisation of the league system in the summer of 1992, no team was promoted from the third tier.											

=== Divizia B (1992–1997) ===
Season	Seria I	Seria II	Seria III	Seria IV
1992–93	Constructorul Iași	Metalul Plopeni	Gaz Metan Mediaș	Phoenix Baia Mare
1993–94	Cetatea Târgu Neamț	Poiana Câmpina	Dacia Pitești	Unirea Dej
1994–95	Foresta Fălticeni	Oțelul Târgoviște	Minerul Motru	Minaur Zlatna
1994–95	Other promoted teams: Electro Mecon Onești (I), Dunărea Călărași (II), ARO Câmpulung (III), Olimpia Satu Mare (IV).			
1995–96	Petrolul Moinești	Danubiana București	Precizia Săcele	CFR Cluj-Napoca
1996–97	Nitramonia Făgăraș	Midia Năvodari	Vega Deva	UM Timișoara

=== Divizia C (1997–2006) ===
Season	Seria I	Seria II	Seria III	Seria IV
1997–98	Laminorul Roman	Cimentul Fieni	Rulmentul Alexandria	Bihor Oradea
1997–98	Other promoted teams: Chimica Târnăveni (I), Drobeta-Turnu Severin (III)			
1998–99	Diplomatic Focșani	Callatis Mangalia	Electro Bere Craiova	UM Timișoara
1998–99	Other promoted teams: Juventus București (II), Flacăra Râmnicu Vâlcea (III)			

Season	Seria I	Seria II	Seria III	Seria IV	Seria V	Seria VI
1999–2000	Apemin Borsec	Hondor Agigea	Fulgerul Bragadiru	Cetate Deva	Pandurii Târgu Jiu	Baia Mare

Season	Seria I	Seria II	Seria III	Seria IV	Seria V	Seria VI	Seria VII	Seria VIII
2000–01	Petrolul Moinești	Dacia Unirea Brăila	Inter Gaz București	Electromagnetica București	Inter Pitești	Minaur Zlatna	IS Câmpia Turzii	Universitatea Cluj
2001–02	Politehnica Unirea Iași	Gloria Buzău	Medgidia	Rulmentul Alexandria	Minerul Motru	Corvinul Hunedoara	Metrom Brașov	CFR Cluj-Napoca
2002–03	Petrolul Moinești	Unirea Urziceni	Juventus București	Dacia Mioveni	Rarora Râmnicu Vâlcea	Jiul Petroșani	Oltul Sfântu Gheorghe	Armătura Zalău
2002–03	Other promoted teams: Laminorul Roman (I), FC Vaslui (I), Poiana Câmpina (II), Callatis Mangalia (III), Electrica Constanța (III), Chindia Târgoviște (IV), Building Vânju Mare (V), Certej (VI), ACU Arad (VI), Precizia Săcele (VII), Tricotaje Ineu (VIII), Oașul Negrești (VIII).							

Season	Seria I	Seria II	Seria III	Seria IV	Seria V	Seria VI	Seria VII	Seria VIII	Seria IX
2003–04	Botoșani	Dunărea Galați	Otopeni	Ghimbav	Oltul Slatina	Politehnica Timișoara	Unirea Sânnicolau Mare	Unirea Dej	FC Sibiu
2004–05	Cetatea Suceava	Portul Constanța	Dunărea Giurgiu	Poiana Câmpina	Râmnicu Vâlcea	CFR Timișoara	Minerul Lupeni	Forex Brașov	Gloria Bistrița II
2005–06	Politehnica Iași II	Delta Tulcea	Snagov	Chimia Brazi	Building Vânju Mare	Oltchim Râmnicu Vâlcea	Auxerre Lugoj	Baia Mare	Ghimbav
2005–06	Ghimbav were not eligible for promotion; runners-up Tractorul Brașov were promoted instead.								

=== Liga III (2006–present) ===
Season	Seria I	Seria II	Seria III	Seria IV	Seria V	Seria VI
2006–07	Focșani	Dinamo București II	Concordia Chiajna	Drobeta-Turnu Severin	Arieșul Turda	Liberty Salonta
2006–07	Other promoted teams: Inter Gaz București (II), Mureșul Deva (V).					
2007–08	Cetatea Suceava	Snagov	Ploiești	Inter Curtea de Argeș	Unirea Sânnicolau Mare	Luceafărul Lotus Băile Felix
2007–08	Other promoted teams: Buftea (III), ACU Arad (V).					
2008–09	Râmnicu Sărat	FCSB II	Victoria Brănești	Gaz Metan CFR Craiova	Fortuna Covaci	Baia Mare
2008–09	Other promoted teams: Tricolorul Breaza (III), Silvania Șimleu Silvaniei (VI).					
2009–10	Dacia Unirea Brăila	Viitorul Constanța	Juventus București	Alro Slatina	Pandurii Târgu Jiu II	Voința Sibiu
2009–10	Other promoted teams: Pandurii Târgu Jiu II were not eligible for promotion; runners-up ACU Arad were promoted instead.					
2010–11	FCM Bacău	Callatis Mangalia	Chindia Târgoviște	Slatina	Luceafărul Oradea	FCMU Baia Mare
2011–12	Rapid CFR Suceava	Unirea Slobozia	Buftea	Damila Măciuca	Recaș	Corona Brașov
2012–13	SC Bacău	Gloria Buzău	Berceni	Minerul Motru	Olimpia Satu Mare	Unirea Tărlungeni
2013–14	Dorohoi	Voluntari	Balotești	Caransebeș	Șoimii Pâncota	Fortuna Poiana Câmpina

Season	Seria I	Seria II	Seria III	Seria IV	Seria V
2014–15	Bucovina Pojorâta	Dunărea Călărași	Chindia Târgoviște	UTA Arad	Baia Mare
2015–16	Sepsi OSK	Juventus București	Afumați	Politehnica Timișoara	Luceafărul Oradea
2016–17	Știința Miroslava	Metaloglobus București	Pitești	Ripensia Timișoara	Hermannstadt
2017–18	Aerostar Bacău	Farul Constanța	Petrolul Ploiești	Șirineasa	Universitatea Cluj
2018–19	Gloria Buzău	Rapid București	Turris-Oltul Turnu Măgurele	Reșița	Csíkszereda Miercurea Ciuc
2019–20	Aerostar Bacău	Unirea Slobozia	Slatina	FCU 1948 Craiova	Comuna Recea
2019–20	The season was suspended due to the COVID-19 pandemic in Romania.				

Season	Seria I	Seria II	Seria III	Seria IV	Seria V	Seria VI	Seria VII	Seria VIII	Seria IX	Seria X
2020–21	Bucovina Rădăuți	Oțelul Galați	Afumați	Steaua București	Corona Brașov	Vedița Colonești	Viitorul Șelimbăr	Șoimii Lipova	Cugir	Minaur Baia Mare
2020–21	Promoted teams via play-offs: Dacia Unirea Brăila, Steaua București, Corona Brașov, Viitorul Șelimbăr, Unirea Dej									
2021–22	Dante Botoșani	Oțelul Galați	Afumați	Progresul Spartac	Odorheiu Secuiesc	Slatina	Reșița	Dumbrăvița	Hunedoara	Minaur Baia Mare
2021–22	Promoted teams via play-offs: Oțelul Galați, Progresul Spartac București, Slatina, Dumbrăvița, Minaur Baia Mare									
2022–23	Foresta Suceava	Metalul Buzău	Afumați	Tunari	Blejoi	Alexandria	Deva	Reșița	Corvinul Hunedoara	Bihor Oradea
2022–23	Promoted teams via play-offs: Ceahlăul Piatra Neamț, Tunari, Alexandria, Reșița, Corvinul Hunedoara									
2023–24	Bucovina Rădăuți	Metalul Buzău	Afumați	Dinamo București	Câmpulung Muscel	Râmnicu Vâlcea	Ghiroda	Bihor Oradea	Gloria Bistrița-Năsăud	Zalău
2023–24	Promoted teams via play-offs: Metalul Buzău, Afumați, Câmpulung Muscel, Bihor Oradea, Unirea Ungheni, Focșani									
2024–25	Bacău	Unirea Braniștea	Popești-Leordeni	Dinamo București	Tunari	Odorheiu Secuiesc	Gloria Bistrița-Năsăud	Râmnicu Vâlcea	Minerul Lupeni	Minaur Baia Mare
2024–25	Promoted teams via play-offs: Bacău, Dinamo București, Tunari, Gloria Bistrița-Năsăud, Olimpia Satu Mare									

Season	Play-off Series I	Play-off Series II	Play-off Series III	Play-off Series IV
2025–26	Cetatea Suceava	Ștefănești	Râmnicu Vâlcea	Știința Poli Timișoara
2025–26	Promoted through the fifth-place tournament: Popești-Leordeni.			

== See also ==
- Liga I
- Liga II
- Liga IV
- Cupa României
