= CS Oxigen București =

Oxigen București
- Full name: Clubul Sportiv Oxigen București
- Nicknames: Daco-Geții (The Daco-Gets); Bătrâna Doamnă din Colentina (The Old Lady from Colentina)
- Founded: 1992; 34 years ago as Juventus Colentina București
- Ground: Colentina
- Capacity: 6,000
- Chairman: Adrian Maftei
- Manager: Alin Chița
- League: Liga III
- Website: oxigen2.ro
Home colours	Away colours

Clubul Sportiv Oxigen București, commonly known as Oxigen București, is a Romanian professional football club based in Bucharest, Sector 2, Colentina neighborhood. From 1992 to the summer of 2018, the team was known as Juventus București, a name which was also used by unrelated Petrolul Ploiești in the past. One year prior to the renaming, Daco-Getica played their first season in the Liga I, the top division in the country. Daco-Getica were expelled after 13 rounds played of the 2019–20 Liga II season.

== History ==
Chart showing the progress of Daco-Getica's league finishes since their founding in 1992 to the present.

Under the ownership of Ilie Ciuclea, was founded in 1992 the football club Juventus Colentina București, club that had officially no legacy with the old Juventus, but was founded to become a football school which would act as a launch pad for young talents. It was enrolled in the Liga III on the place of Calculatorul București, the old club of Colentina neighbourhood, which disappeared from the stage of the Romanian football system, by this maneuver.

Action "Juventus, 1992" has proposed an attempt to follow in the footsteps of the founder of the original Juventus, Ettore Brunelli, to honour his memory and highlight his merits. It was clear that Brunelli was no longer alive, considering that ought to be 110 years old (he was born in Messina on 8 April 1882). Ciuclea searched for potential descendants or heirs in an attempt to offer a symbolic continuation of the old club's tradition. There were intense correspondences between SC Supercom SA by general manager Ilie Ciuclea, the Italian Red Cross and the Italian Embassy in Bucharest, the final result of all efforts was expressed in the answer given on 20 October 2000 by the Italian Embassy in Bucharest which said: "Evidence from the archive that Mr Ettore Brunelli had two sons, Enrico and Giuliana, born in Genoa on 4 September 1909, respectively, on 24 December 1915. Unfortunately, although your initiative is laudable, it is unable to check if two people are still alive." It is likely that Brunelli, with his two sons, have left the country after nationalizing it in 1948, probably the evidence was lost in the political conditions of the time.

In its early years, Juventus Colentina oscillated in Series II of Divizia C under the guidance of coach Dan Anghelescu, finishing 11th in the 1992–93 season, 16th in 1993–94 and 13th in 1994–95, followed by a campaign that culminated with relegation in 1995–96 after a 17th-place finish.

Juventus managed to bounce back in the following years in Series II of the third tier, finishing 13th in the 1997–98 season and 2nd in 1998–99 under Mihai Stoica, thus earning promotion to Divizia B. Juventus then competed in Series I of the second tier for two seasons, achieving a 12th-place finish in 1999–2000, when the team was led by Fănel Țîră in the first six rounds before being replaced by Nicolae Tănăsescu.

The 2000–01 season proved highly tumultuous, with multiple managerial changes. Nicolae Tănăsescu led the team in the first five rounds, followed by a short interim spell for Marian Rusen. From the 8th round Ion Mățăoanu took charge, before Nicolae Babeti was appointed from the 24th round for the remainder of the campaign, which ended in relegation after a 16th-place finish.

Back Divizia C, Juventus Colentina remained competitive, finishing as runners-up in Series IV in 2001–02, two points behind Rulmentul Alexandria, then winning Series III in 2002–03 and securing promotion back to Divizia B. The team then competed in Series II of Divizia B, achieving one of its best performances under Marin Barbu with a 5th-place finish in 2003–04, followed by a 12th-place finish in 2004–05, when Barbu was replaced after 24 rounds by Marian Rusen.

The 2005–06 season ended in relegation after a 14th-place finish, in another season marked by multiple managerial changes. The team was led by Dumitru Firițeanu in the first seven rounds, followed by a short interim spell for Marian Rusen, then Ion Moldovan from rounds 9 to 12, Constantin Stancu from rounds 13 to 18, and again Marian Rusen for the remainder of the season.

Returning to Liga III, Juventus remained among the contenders for promotion, finishing runners-up in Series III of the 2006–07 season and qualifying for the promotion play-off held in Brașov, where it ranked 2nd, after Inter Gaz București and ahead of Pambac Bacău. The club again finished as runners-up, this time in Series II of the 2007–08 season under Pavel Buburuz, but once more missed promotion after the play-off held in Câmpina, finishing behind Buftea and placing above Aerostar Bacău.

Juventus competed in Series III of Liga III in the 2008–09 season, finishing 5th, before winning the series in the 2009–10 campaign and securing promotion to Liga II. In the second tier, the club endured two difficult seasons, finishing 16th in Series I in the first, when it avoided relegation due to the lack of teams, and 14th in Series II in the second, which resulted in relegation.

=== Rise to the Liga I (2015–2018) ===
Former logo, as Juventus București.

After winning the second series of Liga III, at the end of the 2015–16 season, the club promoted back to Liga II, after a hiatus of 4 years. Next year, Romanian Football Federation changed Liga II's system from the one with two series to a league with only one series of 20 teams, after one year since promoting from Liga III, Juventus managed to win the league and thus promoting for the first time ever in the Liga I, by becoming the first ever single winner of Liga II.

Liga I it turned out to be "a nut too hard to break" for "The Old Lady from Colentina" and after finishing the regular season only on the 14th place (the last one), with only 11 points, the team made a slightly better play out, but insufficient to save from relegation, finishing 14th with only 17 points, 10 points away from 13th place and 13 points away from a safe place.

=== Daco-Getica (2018–2026) ===
Former logo, as Daco-Getica București.

After relegating from Liga I at the end of their first season in the top flight of the Romanian football, the club was forced to change its name after being summoned by Juventus to remove the word "Juventus". Thus, from the summer of 2018 the side is known as Daco-Getica București, a reference to the Daco-Getae people belonging to the Thracian branch, who lived on the territory of Romania in the past and are the precursors of the Romanian people.

== Honours ==
=== Leagues ===
Liga II

- Winners (1): 2016–17

Liga III

- Winners (3): 2002–03, 2009–10, 2015–16
- Runners-up (5): 1998–99, 2001–02, 2006–07, 2007–08, 2014–15

Liga IV Bucharest

- Winners (1): 2022–23

== League and cup history ==
Season	Tier	Division	Place	Notes	Cupa României
2024–25	4	Liga IV (B)	4th		
2023–24	4	Liga IV (B)	4th		
2022–23	4	Liga IV (B)	1st (C)		
2021–22	4	Liga IV (B)	7th		
2020–21	5	Liga V (B)	1st (C)	Promoted	
2019–20	2	Liga II	20th	Withdrew	
2018–19	2	Liga II	11th		
2017–18	1	Liga I	14th	Relegated	Round of 16
2016–17	2	Liga II	1st (C)	Promoted	
2015–16	3	Liga III (Seria II)	1st (C)	Promoted	
2014–15	3	Liga III (Seria II)	2nd		
2013–14	3	Liga III (Seria III)	5th		
2012–13	3	Liga III (Seria II)	6th		
2011–12	2	Liga II (Seria II)	14th	Relegated	Round of 32
2010–11	2	Liga II (Seria I)	16th		Round of 32
2009–10	3	Liga III (Seria III)	1st (C)	Promoted	
2008–09	3	Liga III (Seria III)	5th		
2007–08	3	Liga III (Seria II)	2nd		
2006–07	3	Liga III (Seria III)	2nd		Round of 32
2005–06	2	Divizia B (Seria II)	14th	Relegated	
2004–05	2	Divizia B (Seria II)	12th		
2003–04	2	Divizia B (Seria II)	5th		
2002–03	3	Divizia C (Seria III)	1st (C)	Promoted	
2001–02	3	Divizia C (Seria IV)	2nd		
2000–01	2	Divizia B (Seria I)	16th	Relegated	
1999–00	2	Divizia B (Seria I)	12th		
1998–99	3	Divizia C (Seria II)	2nd	Promoted	
1997–98	3	Divizia C (Seria II)	13th		
1995–96	3	Divizia C (Seria II)	17th	Relegated	
1994–95	3	Divizia C (Seria II)	13th		
1993–94	3	Divizia C (Seria II)	16th		
1992–93	3	Divizia C (Seria II)	11th		

== Former managers ==
- (Romania) Dan Anghelescu (1992–1995)
- (Romania) Mihai Stoica (1998–1999)
- (Romania) Fănel Țîră (1999)
- (Romania) Nicolae Tănăsescu (1999–2000)
- (Romania) Marian Rusen (2000) (interim)
- (Romania) Ion Mățăoanu (2000–2001)
- (Romania) Nicolae Babeti (2001)
- (Romania) Marin Barbu (2003–2005)
- (Romania) Marian Rusen (2005)
- (Romania) Dumitru Firițeanu (2005)
- (Romania) Ion Moldovan (2005)
- (Romania) Marian Rusen (2005–2006)
- (Romania) Constantin Stancu (2006)
- (Romania) Pavel Buburuz (2007–2008)
- (Romania) Ionel Augustin (2009–2010)
- (Romania) Alin Artimon (2010)
- (Romania) Alin Chița (2011)
- (Romania) Constantin Schumacher (2011–2012)
- (Romania) Eugen Trică (2012–2013)
- (Romania) Eugen Trică (2014)
- (Romania) Marin Barbu (2015)
- (Romania) Daniel Oprița (2015–2017)
- (Romania) Marius Baciu (2017–2019)
- (Romania) Cristian Câmpeanu (2023–2024)
- (Romania) Marian Zeciu (2024–)
