= FC Știința Bacău =

FC Ştiinţa Bacău
- Full name: Fotbal Club Ştiinţa Bacău
- Short name: Ştiinţa Bacău
- Founded: 2008
- Dissolved: 2009
- Ground: Municipal
- Capacity: 17,500

FC Ştiinţa Bacău was a Romanian football club located in Bacău. The team was founded in 2008 and began playing in the Liga II. The club was dissolved in early 2009.

Luceafărul Lotus Băile Felix had earned the promotion to Liga II at the end of the 2007–08 Liga III, but they announced their withdrawal due to financial reasons. A group of businessmen from Bacău decided to form a new team to occupy the vacant spot. Thus, Ştiinţa Bacău was born.

The club appointed Cristian Ciocoiu, a former football player who played for local team FCM Bacău and Steaua București, as president.

The club was dissolved in January 2009 due to the 2008 financial crisis.

In February 2009 businessman Giani Nedelcu joined with Mircea Crainiciuc and refounded Luceafărul Lotus Băile Felix, which was dissolved during the previous summer. The club took Ştiinţa's place in the championship, but played in the remaining games under the name of Ştiinţa Bacău. After the season's conclusion, Luceafărul reverted to its traditional name.
