= CS ACU Arad =

Romanian football club

ACU Arad
- Nickname(s): Alb-Albaștrii (The White and Blues)
- Short name: ACU Arad
- Founded: 1995
- Dissolved: 2011
- Ground: Motorul
- Capacity: 5,000
Home colours	Away colours

Atletic Club Universitatea (ACU) Arad was a Romanian professional football club from the Arad County, founded in 1995. The club was dissolved in August 2011, after it withdrew from the Liga II championship due to financial difficulties.

== Honours ==
Liga III:

- Runners-up (2): 2007–08, 2009–10

Liga IV – Arad County

- Winners (4): 1998–99

== Stadium ==
ACU Arad played its home matches at Motorul Stadium, Arad, which has a capacity of 5,000 seats.

== Performances ==
Their best performance was a 13th place at the end of the 2003–04 season in the Liga II and reaching the Round of 32 phase in the Romanian Cup in the 2003–04 and 2007–08 seasons.

== Former managers ==
- (Romania) Marcel Coraș (2002–2004)
- (Romania) Petre Grosu (2006)
- (Romania) Ioan Șold
- (Romania) Mihai Jivan
