= ACS Fortuna Covaci =

Fortuna Covaci
- Full name: Asociația Club Sportiv Fortuna Covaci
- Short name: Fortuna
- Founded: 1973; 52 years ago
- Dissolved: 2017; 8 years ago
- Ground: Fortuna
- Capacity: 1,500
- 2016–17: Liga V, Timiș County, 13th (relegated)
Home colours	Away colours

Fortuna Covaci was a Romanian professional football club from Covaci, Timiș County, Romania. The club last played in the Liga V.

== History ==
The club was named Fortuna after Fortuna Düsseldorf, the famous German club, because the owner is a huge fan of it.

Fortuna promoted to the Liga II, for the very first time in history, at the end of the 2008–09 season. But it was a short lived joy with head coach Valentin Negoiţă, because it lasted only one season, relegating back the following season.

The team relegated from the second league directly to the last, the sixth. In next years they also played in the fifth tier, but never left again the county phase until its dissolution in 2017.

== Honours ==
Liga III:

- Winners (1): 2008–09
