= 2015–16 Liga III =

Liga III
- Season: 2015–16
- Promoted: Sepsi OSK; Juventus București; Afumați; ASU Politehnica; Luceafărul Oradea
- Relegated: Bucovina Rădăuţi; FC Zagon; Cetatea Târgu Neamţ; Callatis Mangalia; Inter Olt Slatina; CSM Sighetu Marmaţiei; Luceafărul Bălan
- Matches played: 910
- Top goalscorer: Romică David (20) (Performanța Ighiu)
- Biggest home win: Concordia II 17-0 Urban
- Biggest away win: Gloria 1-8 Juventus
- Highest scoring: Concordia II 17-0 Urban
- All statistics correct as of 28 May 2016.

The 2015–16 Liga III is the 60th season of the Liga III, the third tier of the Romanian football league system. The season began on 28 August.

== Teams ==
At the end of 2014-15 season, Bucovina Pojorâta (Seria I), Dunărea Călărași (Seria II), Chindia Târgoviște, (Seria III), UTA Arad (Seria IV) and FCM Baia Mare (Seria V) promoted to Liga II.
Nine teams were relegated to Liga IV: Ceahlăul II Piatra Neamț and FC Păpăuți (Seria I), Viitorul Axintele and Oțelul II Galați (Seria II), Muscelul Câmpulung and Astra II (Seria III), Minerul Valea Copcii (Seria IV), Gloria Bistrița and Unirea Dej (Seria V).
Last four teams from 2014–15 Liga II were relegated to Liga III: Unirea Slobozia and Săgeata Năvodari (Seria I), Olt Slatina and Fortuna Poiana Câmpina (Seria II).
The winners of the Liga IV Promotion Play-Offs were promoted to Liga III: Performanța Ighiu, FC Aninoasa, Luceafărul Oradea, Înfrățirea Hărman, Olimpia Râmnicu Sărat, CSM Oltenița, Viitorul II Constanța, AFC Odorheiu Secuiesc, Cetate Deva, Voluntari II, Comuna Recea, CS Universitatea II Craiova, Speranța Răucești, Sporting Turnu Măgurele, Petrolistul Boldești, Luceafărul Bălan, Inter Dorohoi, ASU Politehnica Timișoara, Atletico Vaslui, Măgura Cisnădie and CS Panciu.

After the end of the last season, Săgeata Năvodari, Fortuna Poiana Câmpina, CSC Sânmartin and Olt Slatina were dissolved.

FCM Târgoviște, Metropolitan Ișalnița, Speranța Răucești, Știința Turceni and CS Vișina Nouă did not enter in the competition.

Arieșul Turda was excluded for unpaid debts.

Muscelul Câmpulung and Unirea Dej were spared from relegation.

=== Renamed teams ===
Argeșul Pitești was renamed SCM Pitești.

Înfrățirea Hărman was renamed AFC Hărman.

Viitorul Craiova was moved to Ișalnița and renamed Metropolitan Ișalnița.

Vulturii Lugoj was renamed CSM Lugoj.

Inter Clinceni was moved from Clinceni to Slatina and was renamed as Inter Olt Slatina.

Kosarom Pașcani was renamed as CSM Pașcani.

Vulturii Lugoj was renamed as CSM Lugoj.

== League tables ==
=== Seria I ===
Pos	Team	Pld	W	D	L	GF	GA	GD	Pts	Promotion or relegation
1	Sepsi OSK Sfântu Gheorghe (C, P)	26	22	2	2	55	9	+46	68	Promotion to Liga II
2	Olimpia Râmnicu Sărat	26	19	4	3	60	20	+40	61	
3	Știința Miroslava	26	17	2	7	48	19	+29	53	
4	Petrotub Roman	26	14	7	5	53	20	+33	49	
5	Metalosport Galați	26	13	6	7	47	24	+23	45	
6	Sporting Liești	26	13	3	10	45	39	+6	42	
7	Aerostar Bacău	26	12	5	9	36	30	+6	41	
8	Pașcani	26	9	6	11	41	49	−8	33	
9	Panciu	26	8	8	10	29	31	−2	32	
10	Inter Dorohoi	26	4	10	12	26	40	−14	22	
11	Atletico Vaslui	26	4	4	18	23	61	−38	16 (Note: ATL 1-0 BUC; BUC 0-3 ATL)	
12	Bucovina Rădăuți (Note: Bucovina Rădăuți withdrew from the championship and lost all the matches from the second part of the season with 0-3.) (R)	24	4	4	16	15	48	−33	16	Relegation to Liga IV
13	Zagon (Note: FC Zagon withdrew from the championship and lost all the matches from the second part of the season with 0-3.) (R)	24	3	4	17	13	60	−47	13	Relegation to Liga IV
14	Cetatea Târgu Neamț (Note: Cetatea Târgu Neamț were deducted 10 points and was excluded from the championship. Cetatea lost all the matches from the second part of the season with 0-3.) (R)	24	4	1	19	15	56	−41	3	Relegation to Liga IV

Source: FRF (in Romanian)
Rules for classification: 1st points; 2nd head-to-head points; 3rd head-to-head goal difference; 4th head-to-head goals scored; 5th head-to-head away goals scored; 6th goal difference; 7th number of goals scored
(C) Champions; (P) Promoted; (R) Relegated

=== Seria II ===
Pos	Team	Pld	W	D	L	GF	GA	GD	Pts	Promotion or relegation
1	Juventus București (C, P)	24	20	4	0	62	11	+51	64	Promotion to Liga II
2	Delta Dobrogea Tulcea	24	18	5	1	58	13	+45	59	
3	Metaloglobus București	24	16	2	6	43	27	+16	50	
4	Unirea Slobozia	24	12	4	8	51	35	+16	40	
5	Viitorul Domnești	24	11	5	8	49	40	+9	38	
6	Înainte Modelu	24	11	2	11	55	51	+4	35	
7	Petrolistul Boldești	24	9	4	11	38	37	+1	31	
8	Viitorul Constanța II	24	7	5	12	35	45	−10	26	
9	Dinamo București II	24	6	3	15	30	57	−27	21 (Note: DIN 1-2 OLT; OLT 3-6 DIN)	
10	Oltenița	24	6	3	15	36	63	−27	21	
11	Gloria Popești-Leordeni	24	5	5	14	32	65	−33	20 (Note: GLO 3-0 TUN; TUN 4-2 GLO)	
12	Tunari	24	5	5	14	31	50	−19	20	
13	Voința Snagov	24	5	3	16	29	55	−26	18	
14	Callatis Mangalia (Note: Callatis Mangalia withdrew from the championship.) (R)	0	0	0	0	0	0	0	0	Relegation to Liga IV

Source: FRF (in Romanian)
Rules for classification: 1st points; 2nd head-to-head points; 3rd head-to-head goal difference; 4th head-to-head goals scored; 5th head-to-head away goals scored; 6th goal difference; 7th number of goals scored
(C) Champions; (P) Promoted; (R) Relegated

=== Seria III ===
Pos	Team	Pld	W	D	L	GF	GA	GD	Pts	Promotion or relegation
1	Afumați (C, P)	26	18	2	6	42	16	+26	56 (Note: AFU 0-1 PIT; PIT 1–2 AFU)	Promotion to Liga II
2	SCM Pitești	26	18	2	6	56	24	+32	56	
3	Voluntari II	26	17	4	5	61	33	+28	55	
4	Sporting Turnu Măgurele	26	14	3	9	35	29	+6	45	
5	Muscelul Câmpulung	26	12	6	8	31	26	+5	42	
6	Concordia Chiajna II	26	10	5	11	56	39	+17	35 (Note: 1.CON 8P.; 2.SPO 6P.; 3.ATL 1P.)	
7	Sporting Roşiori	26	10	5	11	36	28	+8	35	
8	Atletic Bradu	26	10	5	11	41	41	0	35	
9	Ștefănești	26	9	7	10	33	29	+4	34 (Note: ȘTE 3-0 POD; POD 1–2 ȘTE)	
10	Podari	26	11	1	14	52	42	+10	34	
11	Aninoasa	26	8	7	11	29	36	−7	31	
12	Inter Olt Slatina (Note: Inter Olt Slatina was dissolved and lost all the matches from the second part of the season with 0-3.) (R)	26	9	2	15	23	49	−26	29	Relegation to Liga IV
13	Urban Titu	26	5	1	20	24	85	−61	16 (Note: URB 3-2 HĂR; HĂR 0–0 URB)	
14	Hărman	26	4	4	18	23	65	−42	16	

Source: FRF (in Romanian)
Rules for classification: 1st points; 2nd head-to-head points; 3rd head-to-head goal difference; 4th head-to-head goals scored; 5th head-to-head away goals scored; 6th goal difference; 7th number of goals scored
(C) Champions; (P) Promoted; (R) Relegated

=== Seria IV ===
Pos	Team	Pld	W	D	L	GF	GA	GD	Pts	Promotion
1	ASU Politehnica Timișoara (C, P)	28	20	1	7	58	31	+27	61	Promotion to Liga II
2	Performanța Ighiu	28	17	6	5	50	21	+29	57 (Note: PER 2-0 MET; MET 1–2 PER)	
3	Metalurgistul Cugir	28	18	3	7	57	30	+27	57	
4	Național Sebiș	28	14	6	8	36	28	+8	48	
5	Hunedoara	28	13	5	10	45	44	+1	44	
6	Cetate Deva	28	11	9	8	39	33	+6	42 (Note: CET 2-0 MĂG; MĂG 0–0 CET)	
7	Măgura Cisnădie	28	12	6	10	37	35	+2	42	
8	Pandurii Târgu Jiu II	28	12	5	11	45	34	+11	41 (Note: PAN 2-1 LUG; LUG 1–1 PAN)	
9	Lugoj	28	12	5	11	33	29	+4	41	
10	Nuova Mama Mia Becicherecu Mic	28	11	5	12	42	39	+3	38	
11	Ineu	28	10	4	14	26	32	−6	34	
12	CS U Craiova II	28	8	4	16	40	44	−4	28	
13	Millenium Giarmata	28	5	6	17	27	55	−28	21	
14	Filiași	28	5	5	18	19	47	−28	20	
15	Minerul Motru	28	4	6	18	15	67	−52	18	

Source: FRF (in Romanian)
Rules for classification: 1st points; 2nd head-to-head points; 3rd head-to-head goal difference; 4th head-to-head goals scored; 5th head-to-head away goals scored; 6th goal difference; 7th number of goals scored
(C) Champions; (P) Promoted

=== Seria V ===
Pos	Team	Pld	W	D	L	GF	GA	GD	Pts	Promotion or relegation
1	Luceafărul Oradea (C, P)	26	20	5	1	63	15	+48	65	Promotion to Liga II
2	Avântul Reghin	26	18	4	4	55	23	+32	58	
3	Industria Galda de Jos	26	16	2	8	50	35	+15	50	
4	Unirea Jucu	26	14	7	5	46	24	+22	49	
5	Miercurea Ciuc	26	14	3	9	38	26	+12	45	
6	Sănătatea Cluj	26	12	5	9	51	46	+5	41	
7	Comuna Recea	26	11	3	12	43	40	+3	36	
8	Iernut	26	9	8	9	37	38	−1	35	
9	Oşorhei	26	9	4	13	34	39	−5	31	
10	Unirea Dej	26	8	5	13	32	37	−5	29	
11	Sighetu Marmaţiei (Note: CSM Sighetu Marmației was excluded from the championship and lost all the matches from the second part of the season with 0-3.) (R)	25	8	2	15	27	49	−22	26	Relegation to Liga IV
12	Odorheiu Secuiesc	26	7	4	15	30	55	−25	25	
13	Zalău	26	6	5	15	24	44	−20	23	
14	Luceafărul Bălan (Note: Luceafărul Bălan withdrew from the championship and lost all the matches from the second part of the season with 0-3.) (R)	25	0	1	24	14	73	−59	1	Relegation to Liga IV

Source: FRF (in Romanian)
Rules for classification: 1st points; 2nd head-to-head points; 3rd head-to-head goal difference; 4th head-to-head goals scored; 5th head-to-head away goals scored; 6th goal difference; 7th number of goals scored
(C) Champions; (P) Promoted; (R) Relegated
