= 2014–15 Liga II =

Liga II
- Season: 2014–15
- Promoted: Voluntari; ACS Poli
- Relegated: Olt; Slobozia; Săgeata; Fortuna
- Matches played: 348
- Goals scored: 818 (2.35 per match)
- Top goalscorer: (Seria I); Marius Matei (14) (Seria II); Pedro Henrique (11)
- Biggest home win: Buzău 7−1 Berceni; Academica 6−0 Rapid CFR
- Biggest away win: Tărlungeni 0−5 ACS Poli
- Highest scoring: Brăila 6−3 Dorohoi
- All statistics correct as of 30 May 2015.

The 2014–15 Liga II was the 75th season of the Liga II, the second tier of the Romanian football league system.

The 23 teams were divided into two series (with 12 and 11 teams, respectively). The regular season was played in a round-robin tournament. The first six teams from each series played a play-off for promotion to Liga I. The teams placed 7th to 12th played in a Relegation play-out. The first team in each series was promoted at the end of the season to the Liga I, and the teams placed below the 10th place were relegated to the Liga III.

== Teams ==
At the end of 2013-14 season, Iași, Rapid București from Seria I and ASA, Universitatea Craiova from Seria II were promoted to Liga I.
Six teams were relegated to Liga III : Dunărea, Buzău, Farul (Seria I), FCU Craiova, UTA and Minerul (Seria II).

The winners of the six 2013–14 Liga III series were promoted to Liga II: Dorohoi, Voluntari, Balotești, Caransebeș, Șoimii and Fortuna.

After the end of the last season, FCU Craiova, Dunărea, Vaslui and Corona were dissolved. Bistrița and UTA withdrew from Liga II and enrolled to Liga III.

=== Renamed teams ===
FC Clinceni was moved to Pitești and renamed Academica Argeș.

=== Seria I ===
Location of teams in 2014–15 Liga II - Seria I

Club	City	Stadium	Capacity
Bacău	Bacău	Letea	1,000
Berceni	Berceni	Berceni	2,600
Brăila	Brăila	Municipal	18,000
Voluntari	Voluntari	Niță Pintea	1,000
Farul Constanța	Constanța	Farul	15,500
Gloria Buzău	Buzău	Municipal	18,000
Săgeata Năvodari	Năvodari	Flacăra	5,000
Rapid CFR	Suceava	Areni	12,000
Dorohoi	Dorohoi	Municipal	2,000
Unirea Slobozia	Slobozia	1 Mai	5,000
Balotești	Balotești	Central	3,780
Academica Argeș	Pitești	Nicolae Dobrin	17,500

=== Seria II ===
Location of teams in 2014–15 Liga II - Seria II

Club	City	Stadium	Capacity
ACS Poli	Timișoara	Dan Păltinișanu	32,972
Bihor Oradea	Oradea	Iuliu Bodola	18,000
Metalul Reşiţa	Reșița	Mircea Chivu	12,000
Caransebeș	Caransebeș	Parcul Teiuș	3,000
Mioveni	Mioveni	Dacia	10,000
Olimpia	Satu Mare	Olimpia	18,000
Olt Slatina	Slatina	1 Mai	13,500
Râmnicu Vâlcea	Râmnicu Vâlcea	Municipal	12,000
Tărlungeni	Tărlungeni	Unirea	1,000
Fortuna	Câmpina	Poiana	4,000
Șoimii	Pâncota	Şoimii	2,000

== League tables ==
=== Seria I ===
Pos	Team	Pld	W	D	L	GF	GA	GD	Pts	Promotion or relegation
1	Voluntari	22	17	2	3	58	18	+40	53	Qualification to promotion play-off
2	Academica Argeș	22	14	4	4	44	16	+28	46	Qualification to promotion play-off
3	Rapid CFR	22	11	7	4	39	22	+17	40	Qualification to promotion play-off
4	Gloria Buzău	22	11	4	7	38	30	+8	37	Qualification to promotion play-off
5	Bacău	22	8	6	8	34	28	+6	30	Qualification to promotion play-off
6	Brăila	22	7	8	7	29	28	+1	29	Qualification to promotion play-off
7	Balotești	22	7	5	10	30	34	−4	26	Qualification to relegation play-out
8	Dorohoi	22	6	7	9	30	40	−10	25	Qualification to relegation play-out
9	Farul Constanţa	22	5	7	10	28	40	−12	22	Qualification to relegation play-out
10	Berceni	22	4	7	11	28	47	−19	19	Qualification to relegation play-out
11	Unirea Slobozia (Note: Unirea Slobozia withdrew from the championship due to financial problems and lost all the matches from the second part of the season with 3-0.)	21	3	4	14	14	42	−28	13	Qualification to relegation play-out
12	Săgeata Năvodari (Note: Săgeata Năvodari were deducted 66 points for unpaid debts. Then later were excluded from the championship and they lost all the matches from the second part of the season with 3-0.)	21	6	3	12	14	41	−27	−45	Qualification to relegation play-out

Source: FRF (in Romanian)
Rules for classification: 1st points; 2nd head-to-head points; 3rd head-to-head goal difference; 4th head-to-head goals scored; 5th head-to-head away goals scored; 6th goal difference; 7th number of goals scored

=== Seria II ===
Pos	Team	Pld	W	D	L	GF	GA	GD	Pts	Promotion or relegation
1	ACS Poli Timișoara	20	12	6	2	30	8	+22	42	Qualification to promotion play-off
2	Metalul Reşiţa	20	10	6	4	26	19	+7	36	Qualification to promotion play-off
3	Olt Slatina	20	9	7	4	28	19	+9	34	Qualification to promotion play-off
4	Tărlungeni	20	9	6	5	22	13	+9	33	Qualification to promotion play-off
5	Mioveni	20	9	5	6	17	12	+5	32	Qualification to promotion play-off
6	Olimpia	20	7	4	9	17	19	−2	25	Qualification to promotion play-off
7	Râmnicu Vâlcea	20	5	9	6	18	17	+1	24	Qualification to relegation play-out
8	Caransebeș	20	5	6	9	19	27	−8	21	Qualification to relegation play-out
9	Bihor Oradea	20	3	8	9	13	20	−7	17	Qualification to relegation play-out
10	Șoimii Pâncota	20	3	6	11	18	28	−10	15	Qualification to relegation play-out
11	Fortuna Poiana Câmpina (Note: Fortuna Poiana Câmpina were deducted 14 points for unpaid debts. Then later were withdrew from the championship and they lost all the matches from the second part of the season with 3-0.)	20	5	3	12	16	42	−26	4	Qualification to relegation play-out

Source: FRF (in Romanian)
Rules for classification: 1st points; 2nd head-to-head points; 3rd head-to-head goal difference; 4th head-to-head goals scored; 5th head-to-head away goals scored; 6th goal difference; 7th number of goals scored

== Promotion play-offs ==
At the end of the regular season, the first six teams from each series will play a Promotion play-off and the winners will promote to Liga I. The teams will start the play-off with the number of points gained in the regular season.

=== Seria I ===
Pos	Team	Pld	W	D	L	GF	GA	GD	Pts	Promotion
1	Voluntari (C, P)	32	25	4	3	81	28	+53	79	Promotion to Liga I
2	Academica Argeș	32	20	7	5	67	21	+46	67	
3	Gloria Buzău	32	15	4	13	55	55	0	49	
4	Bacău	32	13	7	12	53	43	+10	46	
5	Rapid CFR Suceava	32	11	9	12	50	53	−3	42	
6	Brăila	32	8	12	12	39	45	−6	36	

Source: FRF (in Romanian)
Rules for classification: 1st points; 2nd head-to-head points; 3rd head-to-head goal difference; 4th head-to-head goals scored; 5th head-to-head away goals scored; 6th goal difference; 7th number of goals scored
(C) Champions; (P) Promoted

=== Seria II ===
Pos	Team	Pld	W	D	L	GF	GA	GD	Pts	Promotion or relegation
1	ACS Poli Timișoara (C, P)	30	19	9	2	52	11	+41	66	Promotion to Liga I
2	Mioveni	30	15	9	6	38	20	+18	54	
3	Sportul Snagov	30	14	9	7	40	30	+10	51	
4	Unirea Tărlungeni	30	12	7	11	34	31	+3	43	
5	Olimpia Satu Mare	30	10	7	13	33	34	−1	37	
6	Olt Slatina (Note: FC Olt Slatina were deducted 6 points for unpaid debts. Then later were withdrew from the championship and they lost all the remaining matches with 3-0.) (R)	30	9	7	14	28	49	−21	28	Relegation to Liga III

Source: FRF (in Romanian)
Rules for classification: 1st points; 2nd head-to-head points; 3rd head-to-head goal difference; 4th head-to-head goals scored; 5th head-to-head away goals scored; 6th goal difference; 7th number of goals scored
(C) Champions; (P) Promoted; (R) Relegated

== Relegation play-outs ==
At the end of the play-out, the teams that finish on 5th or 6th place from each series will relegate to Liga III and the 4th place from Seria I will play a Play-Out match with the 10th place of Seria II, the winner will remain in Liga II while the team which will lose this match will relegate to Liga III.

=== Seria I ===
Pos	Team	Pld	W	D	L	GF	GA	GD	Pts	Relegation
1	Dorohoi	28	9	8	11	42	47	−5	35	
2	Balotești	28	9	7	12	39	43	−4	34	
3	Berceni	28	8	9	11	38	51	−13	33	
4	Farul Constanța	28	5	8	15	36	59	−23	23	
5	Unirea Slobozia (Note: Unirea Slobozia and Săgeata Năvodari were excluded from the relegation play-outs.) (D, R)	0	0	0	0	0	0	0	0	Banned from Liga III
6	Săgeata Năvodari (D, R)	0	0	0	0	0	0	0	0	Banned from Liga III

Source: FRF (in Romanian)
Rules for classification: 1st points; 2nd head-to-head points; 3rd head-to-head goal difference; 4th head-to-head goals scored; 5th head-to-head away goals scored; 6th goal difference; 7th number of goals scored
(D) Disqualified; (R) Relegated

=== Seria II ===
Pos	Team	Pld	W	D	L	GF	GA	GD	Pts	Relegation
1	Râmnicu Vâlcea	26	7	11	8	24	25	−1	32	
2	Caransebeș	26	8	7	11	30	32	−2	31	
3	Șoimii Pâncota	26	5	9	12	22	32	−10	24	
4	Bihor Oradea	26	4	10	12	17	28	−11	22	
5	Fortuna Poiana Câmpina (Note: Fortuna Poiana Câmpina was excluded from the relegation play-outs.) (D, R)	0	0	0	0	0	0	0	0	Banned from Liga III

Source: FRF (in Romanian)
Rules for classification: 1st points; 2nd head-to-head points; 3rd head-to-head goal difference; 4th head-to-head goals scored; 5th head-to-head away goals scored; 6th goal difference; 7th number of goals scored
(D) Disqualified; (R) Relegated

== See also ==
- 2014–15 Liga I
- 2014–15 Liga III
