= 2014–15 Liga III =

Liga III
- Season: 2014–15
- Promoted: Bucovina Pojorâta; Dunărea Călăraşi; Chindia Târgovişte; UTA Arad; FCM Baia Mare
- Relegated: Ceahlăul II Piatra Neamţ; FC Păpăuţi; Viitorul Axintele; Oţelul II Galaţi; Astra II; Minerul Valea Copcii; Gloria Bistriţa
- Matches played: 858
- Goals scored: 2,481 (2.89 per match)
- Top goalscorer: (Seria I); Valentin Buhăcianu (19) (Seria II); Valentin Alexandru (21) (Seria III); Marian Vlada (18) (Seria IV); Bogdan Bozian (12) (Seria V); Vasile Pop (19)
- Biggest home win: Dunărea 10-1 Callatis
- Biggest away win: Dinamo II 0-7 Dunărea
- Highest scoring: Dunărea 10-1 Callatis
- All statistics correct as of 29 May 2015.

The 2014–15 Liga III season is the 59th season of the Liga III, the third tier of the Romanian football league system. The season began on 30 August.

There is a new system, with five series of 13/14 teams that will play a regular season as a round-robin tournament. At the end of the regular season, the first team from each series will be promoted to Liga II. The last two teams from the series with 14 teams and the last one from the series with 13 teams will relegate to Liga IV. From the 12th placed teams, another three are relegated. To determine these teams, separate standings are computed, using only the games played against clubs ranked 1st through 11th.

== Teams ==
At the end of the 2013–14 season, FCM Dorohoi from Seria I, FC Voluntari from Seria II, CS Balotești from Seria III, FC Caransebeș from Seria IV, Șoimii Pâncota from Seria V and Fortuna Poiana Câmpina from Seria VI promoted to Liga II.
Sixteen teams were relegated to Liga IV : CSM Moinești, Sporting Suceava, FCM Bacău (Seria I), Conpet Cireșu, Progresul Cernica and Rapid Fetești (Seria II), FC Balș (Seria III), Munictorul, FCM Reșița, Jiul Rovinari, Minerul Mătăsari, FC Avrig (Seria IV), FC Maramureș (Seria V), CSM Câmpina, Conpet Ploiești and Civitas Făgăraș (Seria VI). The winners of the 21 Play-Off matches of the 2013–14 Liga IV series were promoted to Liga III.

== League tables ==
=== Seria I ===
Pos	Team	Pld	W	D	L	GF	GA	GD	Pts	Promotion or relegation
1	Bucovina Pojorâta (C, P)	22	17	3	2	56	24	+32	54	Promotion to Liga II
2	Știința Miroslava	22	16	1	5	43	19	+24	49	
3	Sepsi OSK Sfântu Gheorghe	22	14	4	4	39	14	+25	46	
4	Aerostar Bacău	22	12	2	8	35	31	+4	38	
5	Petrotub Roman	22	10	2	10	40	32	+8	32	
6	Miercurea Ciuc	22	8	5	9	32	32	0	29	
7	Bucovina Rădăuți	22	7	7	8	30	41	−11	28	
8	Cetatea Târgu Neamț (Note: Cetatea Târgu Neamț were deducted 10 points for unpaid debts.)	22	10	7	5	35	27	+8	27	
9	Kosarom Pașcani	22	6	7	9	30	32	−2	25	
10	Sporting Liești	22	4	3	15	25	49	−24	15	
11	Zagon	22	2	4	16	15	53	−38	10	
12	Ceahlăul II Piatra Neamț (R)	22	2	3	17	20	46	−26	9	Relegation to Liga IV
13	Păpăuți (Note: FC Păpăuți was excluded from the championship.) (R)	0	0	0	0	0	0	0	0	Expelled from the league

Source: FRF (in Romanian)
Rules for classification: 1st points; 2nd head-to-head points; 3rd head-to-head goal difference; 4th head-to-head goals scored; 5th head-to-head away goals scored; 6th goal difference; 7th number of goals scored
(C) Champions; (P) Promoted; (R) Relegated

=== Seria II ===
Pos	Team	Pld	W	D	L	GF	GA	GD	Pts	Promotion or relegation
1	Dunărea Călărași (C, P)	26	19	5	2	79	15	+64	62	Promotion to Liga II
2	Juventus București	26	19	3	4	56	18	+38	60	
3	Delta Dobrogea Tulcea	26	15	4	7	58	33	+25	49	
4	Tunari	26	15	3	8	63	43	+20	48	
5	Metaloglobus București	26	14	3	9	45	35	+10	45	
6	Dinamo II București	26	14	2	10	48	43	+5	44	
7	Gloria Popești-Leordeni	26	11	6	9	46	42	+4	39 (Note: GLO 3-1 ÎNA; ÎNA 1-1 GLO)	
8	Înainte Modelu	26	11	6	9	47	40	+7	39	
9	Metalosport Galați	26	7	6	13	31	45	−14	27	
10	Callatis Mangalia	26	7	4	15	27	64	−37	25	
11	Viitorul Axintele (Note: Viitorul Axintele withdrew from the championship during the second part of it and lost all remaining matches with 3-0.) (R)	25	7	3	15	25	50	−25	24	Relegation to Liga IV
12	Voința Snagov	26	6	2	18	40	65	−25	20 (Note: SNA 5-1 VII; VII 3–1 SNA)	
13	Viitorul Domnești	26	5	5	16	29	58	−29	20	
14	Oțelul Galați II (Note: Oțelul Galați II withdrew from the championship during the winter half and lost all remaining matches with 3-0.) (R)	25	4	2	19	16	59	−43	14	Relegation to Liga IV

Source: FRF (in Romanian)
Rules for classification: 1st points; 2nd head-to-head points; 3rd head-to-head goal difference; 4th head-to-head goals scored; 5th head-to-head away goals scored; 6th goal difference; 7th number of goals scored
(C) Champions; (P) Promoted; (R) Relegated

=== Seria III ===
Pos	Team	Pld	W	D	L	GF	GA	GD	Pts	Promotion or relegation
1	Chindia Târgoviște (C, P)	26	19	2	5	57	19	+38	59	Promotion to Liga II
2	Afumați	26	15	7	4	55	23	+32	52	
3	Concordia Chiajna II	26	14	4	8	53	31	+22	46	
4	Ștefănești	26	12	7	7	44	35	+9	43	
5	Sporting Roșiori	26	10	8	8	39	33	+6	38 (Note: SPO 4-0 ARG; ARG 1–1 SPO)	
6	Argeșul Pitești	26	11	5	10	40	37	+3	38	
7	Atletic Bradu	26	9	8	9	47	42	+5	35	
8	Inter Clinceni	26	10	3	13	40	34	+6	33 (Note: INT 1-0 URB; URB 1–3 INT)	
9	Urban Titu	26	10	3	13	26	38	−12	33	
10	FCM Târgoviște	26	8	6	12	27	48	−21	30	
11	Podari	26	8	5	13	30	40	−10	29 (Note: 1.Podari 7P.; 2.Vişina 7P.; 3.Câmpulung 3P.)	
12	Vișina Nouă	26	9	2	15	34	53	−19	29	
13	Muscelul Câmpulung (R)	26	7	8	11	27	40	−13	29	Relegation to Liga IV
14	Astra II (R)	26	5	2	19	22	68	−46	17	Relegation to Liga IV

Source: FRF (in Romanian)
Rules for classification: 1st points; 2nd head-to-head points; 3rd head-to-head goal difference; 4th head-to-head goals scored; 5th head-to-head away goals scored; 6th goal difference; 7th number of goals scored
(C) Champions; (P) Promoted; (R) Relegated

=== Seria IV ===
Pos	Team	Pld	W	D	L	GF	GA	GD	Pts	Promotion or relegation
1	UTA Arad (C, P)	24	17	5	2	56	20	+36	56	Promotion to Liga II
2	Nuova Mama Mia Becicherecu Mic	24	15	7	2	54	13	+41	52	
3	Vulturii Lugoj	24	16	2	6	31	19	+12	50 (Note: VUL 0-2 NAŢ; NAŢ 2–4 VUL)	
4	Național Sebiș	24	15	5	4	47	15	+32	50	
5	Millenium Giarmata	24	10	4	10	23	25	−2	34	
6	Pandurii Târgu Jiu II	24	8	6	10	36	40	−4	30	
7	Filiași	24	7	8	9	26	25	+1	29	
8	Hunedoara	24	8	4	12	22	38	−16	28 (Note: HUN 0-0 INE; INE 1–2 HUN)	
9	Ineu	24	8	4	12	22	36	−14	28	
10	Știința Turceni	24	6	7	11	24	34	−10	25	
11	Minerul Motru (Note: Minerul Motru were deducted 2 points for unpaid debts.)	24	6	7	11	31	40	−9	23	
12	Viitorul Craiova	24	4	7	13	24	43	−19	19	
13	Minerul Valea Copcii (Note: Minerul Valea Copcii withdrew from the championship during the winter break and lost all remaining matches with 3-0.) (R)	24	2	2	20	6	54	−48	8	Relegation to Liga IV

Source: FRF (in Romanian)
Rules for classification: 1st points; 2nd head-to-head points; 3rd head-to-head goal difference; 4th head-to-head goals scored; 5th head-to-head away goals scored; 6th goal difference; 7th number of goals scored
(C) Champions; (P) Promoted; (R) Relegated

=== Seria V ===
Pos	Team	Pld	W	D	L	GF	GA	GD	Pts	Promotion or relegation
1	FCM Baia Mare (C, P)	26	18	3	5	53	13	+40	57	Promotion to Liga II
2	Metalurgistul Cugir	26	17	4	5	50	28	+22	55	
3	Zalău	26	15	4	7	52	32	+20	49	
4	Sighetu Marmației	26	14	5	7	40	23	+17	47	
5	Oșorhei	26	12	3	11	37	31	+6	39	
6	Sânmartin	26	11	3	12	35	36	−1	36	
7	Unirea Jucu	26	10	5	11	38	37	+1	35	
8	Arieșul Turda (Note: Arieşul Turda were deducted 8 points for unpaid debts.)	26	12	5	9	37	33	+4	33 (Note: 1.Arieşul 7P.; 2.Avântul 5P.; 3.Industria 4P.)	
9	Avântul Reghin	26	9	6	11	25	37	−12	33	
10	Industria Galda de Jos	26	9	6	11	42	46	−4	33	
11	Iernut	26	8	2	16	42	67	−25	26	
12	Sănătatea Cluj	26	6	3	17	31	66	−35	21 (Note: SĂN 1-0 GLO; GLO 1–1 SĂN)	
13	Gloria Bistrița (Note: Gloria Bistriţa were deducted 12 points for unpaid debts.) (R)	26	9	6	11	37	35	+2	21	Relegation to Liga IV
14	Unirea Dej (R)	26	2	5	19	19	54	−35	11	Relegation to Liga IV

Source: FRF (in Romanian)
Rules for classification: 1st points; 2nd head-to-head points; 3rd head-to-head goal difference; 4th head-to-head goals scored; 5th head-to-head away goals scored; 6th goal difference; 7th number of goals scored
(C) Champions; (P) Promoted; (R) Relegated
