= Ionuț Rădescu =

Romanian footballer

Personal information
- Full name: Laurențiu Ionuț Rădescu
- Date of birth: 20 March 1995 (age 31)
- Place of birth: Câmpulung, Romania
- Height: 1.73 m (5 ft 8 in)
- Position: Winger

Team information
- Current team: Argeș Pitești
- Number: 16

Youth career
- –2011: CS Rucăr
- 2011–2013: Argeș Pitești

Senior career*
Years	Team	Apps	(Gls)
2013–2014	Atletic Bradu		
2014–2015	Urban Titu		
2016	Atletic Bradu		
2016–2023	Mioveni	206	(23)
2023–	Argeș Pitești	93	(3)
- * Club domestic league appearances and goals as of 6 November 2026

Laurențiu Ionuț Rădescu (born 20 March 1995) is a Romanian professional footballer who plays as a winger for Liga I club Argeș Pitești.

== Career statistics ==
=== Club ===
As of match played 6 November 2026

Club	Season	League			Cupa României		Europe		Other		Total	
Club	Season	Division	Apps	Goals	Apps	Goals	Apps	Goals	Apps	Goals	Apps	Goals
Atletic Bradu	2013–14	Liga III	?	?	?	?	–		–		?	?
Atletic Bradu	2014–15	Liga III	?	?	?	?	–		–		?	?
Atletic Bradu	2015–16	Liga III	?	?	?	?	–		–		?	?
Atletic Bradu	Total		?	?	?	?	–		–		?	?
Atletic Bradu	2015–16	Liga III	?	?	–		–		–		?	?
Mioveni	2016–17	Liga II	31	4	3	1	–		–		34	5
Mioveni	2017–18	Liga II	32	8	1	0	–		–		33	8
Mioveni	2018–19	Liga II	35	6	3	1	–		–		38	7
Mioveni	2019–20	Liga II	11	2	0	0	–		2 (Note: Appearances in Liga I promotion/relegation play-offs)	0	13	2
Mioveni	2020–21	Liga II	29	2	1	0	–		2	0	32	2
Mioveni	2021–22	Liga I	35	1	1	0	–		–		36	1
Mioveni	2022–23	Liga I	33	0	4	1	–		–		37	1
Mioveni	Total		206	23	13	3	–		4	0	223	26
Argeș Pitești	2023–24	Liga II	23	1	1	0	–		–		24	1
Argeș Pitești	2024–25	Liga II	24	1	4	0	–		–		28	1
Argeș Pitești	2025–26	Liga I	33	1	4	0	–		–		38	1
Argeș Pitești	2026–27	Liga I	13	0	2	0	–		–		15	0
Argeș Pitești	Total		93	3	11	0	–		–		104	3
Career total			299	26	24	3	–		4	0	327	29

== Honours ==
Argeș Pitești

- Liga II: 2024–25
