= ACS Berceni =

Romanian football club

- Full name: Club Sportiv Berceni
- Nicknames: Bercenarii (The people from Berceni)
- Founded: 1957 as Viitorul Berceni; 2017 (refounded)
- Dissolved: 2022
- Ground: Berceni
- Capacity: 2,700
- 2021–22: Liga IV, Ilfov County, 9th
| Home colours | Away colours | Third colours |

Club Sportiv Berceni was a Romanian professional football club based in Berceni, Ilfov County, founded in 2008 and dissolved in 2016, then re-established in 2017, only to be dissolved again in 2022.

== History ==
Founded in 1957 as Viitorul Berceni, the team from Berceni commune near Bucharest did not achieve much throughout its existence, playing only at raion level in the Bucharest Regional Championships and, after 1968, at county level in the Ilfov championships. However, after businessman Marian Dodu took over the club and renamed it Dodu Berceni, the team reached Liga III in the 2005–06 season by winning Divizia D – Ilfov County and the promotion play-off against Gaz Metan Finta, the Dâmbovița County champions, securing a 6–0 win at Conpet Stadium in Strejnicu.

In Liga III, the team finished 5th in Series II in the 2006–07 season and 12th in Series III in 2007–08. In 2008, following Marian Dodu’s purchase of Progresul București, the club was taken over by the local authorities and renamed ACS Berceni, ending the 2008–09 season in 10th place in Series III, with Ion Manea on the bench.

In 2009, former Dinamo București player Marin Dragnea was appointed head coach, while the club’s infrastructure improved significantly. Although the team was top of the table at the end of the first half of the 2009–10 Liga III season, Bercenarii eventually finished 2nd after a fierce battle with Viitorul Constanța, the eventual winners of the series. The squad included, among others, Mihalcea, Andreescu, Andrei, C. Sandu, Fâșie, Al. Stan, Mălău, Grigore, Pintilie, Ene, Culda, Frangu, Călin, Ghinea, Constantin, Pivniceru, I. Petre, Conachi, Marulis, Crețu, Nedelcu, and Mocanu.

Dragnea coached the team until December, when he was replaced by Dumitru Bolborea, who led ACS Berceni to a 3rd-place finish in the 2010–11 season. Poor results at the start of the 2011–12 season led to Bolborea’s dismissal at the end of October, with Dragnea returning to the bench for the remainder of the campaign and leading the team to another 3rd-place finish, already seen as a promotion contender.

The 2012–13 season began with ACS Berceni preparing for a promotion push under a new coaching staff, as the head coach position was entrusted to Laurențiu Diniță. Although the team qualified for the Round of 32 in the Cupa României, where it lost 0–2 to CFR Cluj, and was leading Series III after fourteen rounds, Diniță left following a 0–4 defeat to Ștefănești and was replaced by Adrian Matei, who went on to guide the team to its first-ever promotion to Liga II. The squad included, among others, Meilă, V. Constantin, Ionică, Ioniță, Paraschivoiu, Al. Stan, Fâșie, C. Sandu, Pazon, T. Barbu, Frangu, Al. Radu, Müller, Ghinea, Pătrașcu, Ciochină, Bănaru, Bereșoae, Crețu, Marulis, and Tătar.

In Liga II, Marian Dragnea took charge once again with the squad strengthened by several experienced players who had also competed in Liga I such as Epaminonda Nicu, Răzvan Pădurețu, Bogdan Aldea, Constantin Nistor and Rover Cârstea. Under his guidance, ACS Berceni reached the Round of 32 of the Cupa României where it lost 1–4 to Astra Giurgiu fielding the lineup L. Marin – C. Mihai, C. Sandu, Al. Stan ('89 Roman), Trestenicu ('59 Aldea) – Ghinea ('76 Pazon), Pătrașcu, Ștefan, Pivniceru – T. Fatai, Voican. The team went on to finish 5th in both the regular season and play-off phase of Series I in the 2013–14 campaign.

In the 2014–15 season, Dragnea once again led the team to the Round of 32 in the Cupa României where Berceni lost 0–3 to FCSB with the following lineup Andreescu – Ionescu, Nicu, Cioranu, Sandu – Ursu, Pătrașcu, Ettien, Al. Radu, Ghinea – A. Marin. Dragnea was replaced during the winter break by Silviu Ion who after only one official match was succeeded by Adrian Mihalcea. Under Mihalcea’s management the team finished 10th in the regular season and 9th after the play-out stage of Series I.

Marian Dragnea returned for the 2015–16 campaign during which the team qualified for the Round of 32 of the Cupa României for the fourth consecutive year being eliminated 1–1 after extra time and 2–4 on penalties by CSMS Iași. The squad for that match included Manciu – Ciucă, Fâșie, Cioranu, A. Radu – Al. Radu, Neagu, Ettien, Pătrașcu – Ionică, Dobre. Dragnea was dismissed in October and briefly replaced on an interim basis by Epaminonda Nicu before Marian Rada was appointed. Rada led the team to 7th place after the regular season but was dismissed in April after three play-out matches and replaced by Răzvan Rotaru under whom the team finished 8th in Series I.

In the summer of 2016, the team was forced to relocate to Buftea after clashing with the local administration of Berceni. Marcel Abăluță was appointed as head coach for the 2016–17 season, but, with only one point earned after eleven rounds, a point later annulled following the withdrawal of Șoimii Pâncota, he was dismissed and replaced by Mugur Bolohan. After fifteen rounds, the team sat bottom of the table with zero points and subsequently withdrew from the championship.

Following the relocation and eventual withdrawal, Viitorul Berceni was founded in the commune and competed in Liga IV – Ilfov County, later being integrated in 2017 into the newly created multisport club CS Berceni, established by the local authorities.

== Honours ==
Liga III

- Winners (1): 2012–13
- Runners-up (1): 2009–10

Liga IV – Ilfov County

- Winners (1): 2005–06

== League and Cup history ==
| Season | Tier | Division | Place | Notes | Cupa României |
|---|---|---|---|---|---|
| 2016–17 | 2 | Liga II | 19th | Withdrew | |
| 2015–16 | 2 | Liga II (Seria I) | 8th | | Round of 32 |
| 2014–15 | 2 | Liga II (Seria I) | 9th | | Round of 32 |
| 2013–14 | 2 | Liga II (Seria I) | 5th | | Round of 32 |
| 2012–13 | 3 | Liga III (Seria III) | 1st (C) | Promoted | Round of 32 |

| Season | Tier | Division | Place | Notes | Cupa României |
|---|---|---|---|---|---|
| 2011–12 | 3 | Liga III (Seria II) | 3rd | | |
| 2010–11 | 3 | Liga III (Seria II) | 3rd | | Fifth Round |
| 2009–10 | 3 | Liga III (Seria II) | 2nd | | |
| 2008–09 | 3 | Liga III (Seria III) | 10th | | |
| 2007–08 | 3 | Liga III (Seria III) | 12th | | |

== Former managers ==
- (Romania) Marius Șumudică (2007)
- (Romania) Ion Manea (2008–2009)
- (Romania) Marin Dragnea (2009–2011)
- (Romania) Dumitru Bolborea (2012)
- (Romania) Marin Dragnea (2012)
- (Romania) Laurențiu Diniță (2012–2013)
- (Romania) Adrian Matei (2013)
- (Romania) Marin Dragnea (2013–2014)
- (Romania) Silviu Ion (2015)
- (Romania) Adrian Mihalcea (2015)
- (Romania) Marin Dragnea (2015)
- (Romania) Marian Rada (2015–2016)
- (Romania) Marcel Abăluță (2016)
- (Romania) Mugur Bolohan (2016)
