= 2013–14 Liga III =

Liga III
- Season: 2013–14

The 2013–14 Liga III was the 58th season of Liga III, the third tier of the Romanian football league system. The season began on 30 August 2013 and concluded on 6 June 2014.

The format was changed to 72 teams divided into six geographically based series of twelve teams each. Following a 22-match double round-robin regular season, the top six teams in each series qualified for the play-off, while the bottom six entered the play-out. Both phases were contested in a double round-robin format over ten additional matches, with teams retaining only the points earned against the other teams in their respective play-off or play-out series during the regular season. The winners of the six play-off series were promoted to Liga II, while the bottom three teams in each play-out series, together with the lowest-ranked 9th-placed team overall, were relegated to Liga IV.

== Team changes ==
=== To Liga II ===
Promoted to Liga II

- SC Bacău – ended a three-year stay.
- Gloria Buzău – ended a one-year stay.
- Berceni – ended a seven-year stay.
- Minerul Motru – ended a seven-year stay.
- Olimpia Satu Mare – ended a two-year stay.
- Unirea Tărlungeni – ended a six-year stay.

=== From Liga II ===
Relegated from Liga II

- Chindia Târgoviște – returned after two years.
- Dinamo București II – returned after six years.
- FCM Bacău – returned after two years.
- Callatis Mangalia – returned after two years.
- Maramureș Universitar Baia Mare – returned after two years.

Another six teams from Liga II were dissolved or withdrew to lower divisions, including Astra II, Unirea Alba Iulia, Voința Sibiu, Politehnica Timișoara, and Olt Slatina.

=== From Liga IV ===
Promoted from Liga IV

- Pojorâta
- Baia Mare
- Unirea Jucu
- Ineu
- Cugir
- Nuova Mama Mia Becicherecu Mic
- Avrig
- Știința Turceni
- Păpăuți
- Câmpina
- Cetatea Târgu Neamț
- Sporting Liești
- Avântul Conpet Cireșu
- Callatis Mangalia
- Atletic Bradu
- Balș
- Podari

=== To Liga IV ===
Relegated to Liga IV

- Young Stars Panciu (withdrew)
- Rapid București II (withdrew)
- Sportul Studenţesc București II
- Focșani (withdrew)
- Eolica Baia (withdrew)
- Alexandria
- Flacăra Făget
- Vladimirescu
- Europa Alba Iulia
- Plimob Sighetu Marmației
- Jiul Petroșani (withdrew)
- Turda (withdrew)
- Girom Albota (withdrew)

=== Other changes ===
- The promoted teams Negri, Mureșul Luduș and Corbeanca withdrew.
- The promoted side Gloria Cornești merged with CS Popești-Leordeni to form Gloria Popești-Leordeni.
- FC Pojorâta was renamed Bucovina Pojorâta.
- CSO Cugir was renamed Metalurgistul Cugir 1939.
- Seso Câmpia Turzii moved from Câmpia Turzii and was renamed Arieșul 1907 Turda.
- Fortuna Brazi moved from Brazi to Poiana Câmpina and was renamed Fortuna Poiana Câmpina.
- Apa Craiova was spared from relegation and was subsequently renamed Viitorul Municipal Craiova.
- Știința Miroslava, Ceahlăul Piatra Neamț II, Rapid Fetești, Viitorul Domnești, Concordia Chiajna II, Tunari, Sănătatea Cluj and Civitas Făgăraș were spared from relegation.

== Regular season ==
=== Series I ===
Pos	Team	Pld	W	D	L	GF	GA	GD	Pts	Qualification
1	Kosarom Pașcani	20	10	6	4	37	18	+19	36	Qualification to Play-off round
2	Dorohoi	20	10	6	4	36	23	+13	36	Qualification to Play-off round
3	Petrotub Roman	20	10	5	5	30	20	+10	35	Qualification to Play-off round
4	Știința Miroslava	20	11	2	7	29	19	+10	35	Qualification to Play-off round
5	Cetatea Târgu Neamț	20	10	5	5	28	21	+7	35	Qualification to Play-off round
6	Bucovina Pojorâta	20	9	4	7	27	28	−1	31	Qualification to Play-off round
7	Moinești	20	9	1	10	32	34	−2	28	Qualification to Play-out round
8	Ceahlăul Piatra Neamț II	20	7	5	8	28	31	−3	26	Qualification to Play-out round
9	Sporting Suceava	20	4	4	12	20	43	−23	16	Qualification to Play-out round
10	Bucovina Rădăuți	20	3	6	11	16	34	−18	15	Qualification to Play-out round
11	Aerostar Bacău	20	4	2	14	14	26	−12	14	Qualification to Play-out round
12	FCM Bacău (Note: FCM Bacău withdrew before the start of the season.) (D)	0	0	0	0	0	0	0	0	Withdrew

Source: FRF (in Romanian)
Rules for classification: 1st points; 2nd head-to-head points; 3rd head-to-head goal difference; 4th head-to-head goals scored; 5th head-to-head away goals scored; 6th goal difference; 7th number of goals scored
(D) Disqualified

=== Series II ===
Pos	Team	Pld	W	D	L	GF	GA	GD	Pts	Qualification
1	Voluntari	22	17	4	1	49	10	+39	55	Qualification to Play-off round
2	Ștefănești	22	15	3	4	49	18	+31	48	Qualification to Play-off round
3	Afumați	22	12	8	2	45	17	+28	44	Qualification to Play-off round
4	Dunărea Călărași	22	13	0	9	43	28	+15	39	Qualification to Play-off round
5	Gloria Popești-Leordeni	22	11	5	6	37	23	+14	38	Qualification to Play-off round
6	Viitorul Axintele	22	10	7	5	31	16	+15	37	Qualification to Play-off round
7	Oțelul Galați II	22	7	5	10	26	36	−10	26	Qualification to Play-out round
8	Callatis Mangalia	22	8	2	12	28	44	−16	26	Qualification to Play-out round
9	Sporting Liești	22	6	2	14	29	48	−19	20	Qualification to Play-out round
10	Avântul Conpet Cireșu	22	4	4	14	28	51	−23	16	Qualification to Play-out round
11	Progresul Cernica (Note: Progresul Cernica withdrew after 21 rounds and lost all matches in the second half 0–3.)	22	3	3	16	14	48	−34	12	Qualification to Play-out round
12	Rapid Fetești	22	3	3	16	12	52	−40	12	Qualification to Play-out round

Source: FRF (in Romanian)
Rules for classification: 1st points; 2nd head-to-head points; 3rd head-to-head goal difference; 4th head-to-head goals scored; 5th head-to-head away goals scored; 6th goal difference; 7th number of goals scored

=== Series III ===
Pos	Team	Pld	W	D	L	GF	GA	GD	Pts	Qualification
1	Juventus București	22	15	2	5	50	26	+24	47	Qualification to Play-off round
2	Balotești	22	11	7	4	34	24	+10	40	Qualification to Play-off round
3	Vișina Nouă	22	11	5	6	30	24	+6	38	Qualification to Play-off round
4	Inter Clinceni	22	10	4	8	33	29	+4	34	Qualification to Play-off round
5	Metaloglobus București	22	9	4	9	28	27	+1	31	Qualification to Play-off round
6	Balș	22	9	4	9	32	35	−3	31	Qualification to Play-off round
7	Dinamo București II	22	8	6	8	38	26	+12	30	Qualification to Play-out round
8	Tunari	22	8	6	8	36	41	−5	30	Qualification to Play-out round
9	Viitorul Domnești	22	7	3	12	23	45	−22	24	Qualification to Play-out round
10	Podari	22	6	4	12	26	32	−6	22	Qualification to Play-out round
11	Concordia Chiajna II	22	6	4	12	21	33	−12	22	Qualification to Play-out round
12	Viitorul Municipal Craiova	22	6	3	13	21	30	−9	21	Qualification to Play-out round

Source: FRF (in Romanian)
Rules for classification: 1st points; 2nd head-to-head points; 3rd head-to-head goal difference; 4th head-to-head goals scored; 5th head-to-head away goals scored; 6th goal difference; 7th number of goals scored

=== Series IV ===
Pos	Team	Pld	W	D	L	GF	GA	GD	Pts	Qualification
1	Caransebeș	20	15	2	3	40	12	+28	47	Qualification to Play-off round
2	Nuova Mama Mia Becicherecu Mic	20	13	5	2	41	12	+29	44	Qualification to Play-off round
3	Hunedoara	20	14	0	6	34	14	+20	42	Qualification to Play-off round
4	Millenium Giarmata	20	10	6	4	32	22	+10	36	Qualification to Play-off round
5	Pandurii Târgu Jiu II	20	9	4	7	27	22	+5	31	Qualification to Play-off round
6	Vulturii Lugoj	20	9	3	8	34	30	+4	30	Qualification to Play-off round
7	Știința Turceni	20	5	5	10	23	39	−16	20	Qualification to Play-out round
8	Muncitorul Reșița	20	5	3	12	29	32	−3	18	Qualification to Play-out round
9	Reșița	20	5	2	13	14	40	−26	17	Qualification to Play-out round
10	Jiul Rovinari	20	7	6	7	26	23	+3	9 (Note: Jiul Rovinari were deducted 18 points.)	Qualification to Play-out round
11	Avrig (Note: Avrig withdrew after 14 rounds and lost all matches in the second half 0–3.)	20	0	0	20	8	62	−54	0	Qualification to Play-out round
12	Minerul Jilț Mătăsari (Note: Minerul Mătăsari withdrew before the start of the season.) (D)	0	0	0	0	0	0	0	0	Withdrew

Source: FRF (in Romanian)
Rules for classification: 1st points; 3rd head-to-head goal difference; 4th head-to-head goals scored; 5th head-to-head away goals scored; 6th goal difference; 7th number of goals scored
(D) Disqualified

=== Series V ===
Pos	Team	Pld	W	D	L	GF	GA	GD	Pts	Qualification
1	Metalurgistul Cugir	20	14	3	3	46	23	+23	45	Qualification to Play-off round
2	Național Sebiș	20	11	7	2	31	11	+20	40	Qualification to Play-off round
3	Șoimii Pâncota	20	11	4	5	36	20	+16	37	Qualification to Play-off round
4	Oșorhei	20	9	4	7	24	23	+1	31	Qualification to Play-off round
5	Baia Mare	20	8	5	7	27	25	+2	29	Qualification to Play-off round
6	Ineu	20	7	7	6	27	18	+9	28	Qualification to Play-off round
7	Zalău	20	7	5	8	32	34	−2	26	Qualification to Play-out round
8	Sănătatea Cluj	20	7	4	9	22	32	−10	25	Qualification to Play-out round
9	Unirea Jucu	20	5	3	12	24	35	−11	18	Qualification to Play-out round
10	Arieșul 1907 Turda	20	2	9	9	18	35	−17	15	Qualification to Play-out round
11	Unirea Dej	20	3	1	16	16	47	−31	10	Qualification to Play-out round
12	Maramureș Universitar Baia Mare (Note: Maramureș Universitar Baia Mare didn't attend the first two games of the season and was excluded.)	0	0	0	0	0	0	0	0	Excluded

Source: FRF (in Romanian)
Rules for classification: 1st points; 2nd head-to-head points; 3rd head-to-head goal difference; 4th head-to-head goals scored; 5th head-to-head away goals scored; 6th goal difference; 7th number of goals scored

=== Series VI ===
Pos	Team	Pld	W	D	L	GF	GA	GD	Pts	Qualification
1	Chindia Târgoviște	22	15	6	1	43	10	+33	51	Qualification to Play-off round
2	Fortuna Poiana Câmpina	22	15	3	4	57	15	+42	48	Qualification to Play-off round
3	Argeșul Pitești	22	13	7	2	47	18	+29	46	Qualification to Play-off round
4	Zagon	22	11	6	5	33	21	+12	39	Qualification to Play-off round
5	Câmpina	22	12	3	7	25	16	+9	39	Qualification to Play-off round
6	Atletic Bradu	22	11	5	6	37	31	+6	38	Qualification to Play-off round
7	Conpet Ploiești	22	5	9	8	22	26	−4	24	Qualification to Play-out round
8	Avântul Reghin	22	5	7	10	23	32	−9	22	Qualification to Play-out round
9	Urban Titu	22	6	2	14	19	36	−17	20	Qualification to Play-out round
10	Târgoviște	22	5	4	13	19	46	−27	19	Qualification to Play-out round
11	Păpăuți	22	4	6	12	22	50	−28	18	Qualification to Play-out round
12	Civitas Făgăraș (Note: Civitas Făgăraș withdrew after 11 rounds and lost all matches in the second half 0–3.)	22	0	2	20	9	55	−46	2	Qualification to Play-out round

Source: FRF (in Romanian)
Rules for classification: 1st points; 2nd head-to-head points; 3rd head-to-head goal difference; 4th head-to-head goals scored; 5th head-to-head away goals scored; 6th goal difference; 7th number of goals scored

== Play-off round ==
=== Series I ===
Pos	Team	Pld	W	D	L	GF	GA	GD	Pts	Promotion
1	Dorohoi	20	11	7	2	36	16	+20	40	Promotion to Liga II
2	Petrotub Roman	20	9	5	6	32	25	+7	32	
3	Știința Miroslava	20	8	2	10	26	29	−3	26	
4	Cetatea Târgu Neamț	20	7	4	9	20	27	−7	25	
5	Kosarom Pașcani	20	5	9	6	24	22	+2	24	
6	Bucovina Pojorâta	20	4	5	11	14	33	−19	17	

Source: FRF (in Romanian)
Rules for classification: 1st points; 2nd head-to-head points; 3rd head-to-head goal difference; 4th head-to-head goals scored; 5th head-to-head away goals scored; 6th goal difference; 7th number of goals scored

=== Series II ===
Pos	Team	Pld	W	D	L	GF	GA	GD	Pts	Promotion
1	Voluntari (C)	20	14	3	3	38	15	+23	45	Promotion to Liga II
2	Viitorul Axintele	20	8	7	5	18	16	+2	31	
3	Ștefănești	20	8	6	6	26	21	+5	30	
4	Afumați	20	7	7	6	22	19	+3	28	
5	Dunărea Călărași	20	4	3	13	16	32	−16	15	
6	Gloria Popești-Leordeni	20	2	8	10	19	36	−17	14	

Source: FRF (in Romanian)
Rules for classification: 1st points; 2nd head-to-head points; 3rd head-to-head goal difference; 4th head-to-head goals scored; 5th head-to-head away goals scored; 6th goal difference; 7th number of goals scored
(C) Champions

=== Series III ===
Pos	Team	Pld	W	D	L	GF	GA	GD	Pts	Promotion
1	Balotești	20	10	6	4	30	24	+6	36	Promotion to Liga II
2	Inter Clinceni	20	11	3	6	37	22	+15	36	
3	Vișina Nouă	20	9	5	6	23	21	+2	32	
4	Metaloglobus București	20	9	2	9	29	27	+2	29	
5	Juventus București	20	8	3	9	36	27	+9	27	
6	Balș	20	3	1	16	12	46	−34	10	

Source: FRF (in Romanian)
Rules for classification: 1st points; 2nd head-to-head points; 3rd head-to-head goal difference; 4th head-to-head goals scored; 5th head-to-head away goals scored; 6th goal difference; 7th number of goals scored

=== Series IV ===
Pos	Team	Pld	W	D	L	GF	GA	GD	Pts	Promotion
1	Caransebeș	20	12	4	4	32	20	+12	40	Promotion to Liga II
2	Nuova Mama Mia Becicherecu Mic	20	11	6	3	36	14	+22	39	
3	Hunedoara	20	8	1	11	23	28	−5	25	
4	Pandurii Târgu Jiu II	20	7	3	10	32	37	−5	24	
5	Vulturii Lugoj	20	5	5	10	25	32	−7	20	
6	Millenium Giarmata	20	5	5	10	24	41	−17	20	

Source: FRF (in Romanian)
Rules for classification: 1st points; 2nd head-to-head points; 3rd head-to-head goal difference; 4th head-to-head goals scored; 5th head-to-head away goals scored; 6th goal difference; 7th number of goals scored

=== Series V ===
Pos	Team	Pld	W	D	L	GF	GA	GD	Pts	Promotion
1	Șoimii Pâncota	20	12	4	4	29	15	+14	40	Promotion to Liga II
2	Național Sebiș	20	8	8	4	24	15	+9	32	
3	Metalurgistul Cugir	20	8	7	5	36	28	+8	31	
4	Oșorhei	20	5	6	9	21	28	−7	21	
5	Ineu	20	5	5	10	19	27	−8	20	
6	Baia Mare	20	3	8	9	17	33	−16	17	

Source: FRF (in Romanian)
Rules for classification: 1st points; 2nd head-to-head points; 3rd head-to-head goal difference; 4th head-to-head goals scored; 5th head-to-head away goals scored; 6th goal difference; 7th number of goals scored

=== Series VI ===
Pos	Team	Pld	W	D	L	GF	GA	GD	Pts	Promotion
1	Fortuna Poiana Câmpina	20	15	1	4	47	14	+33	46	Promotion to Liga II
2	Chindia Târgoviște	20	14	4	2	39	11	+28	46	
3	Argeșul Pitești	20	7	7	6	21	23	−2	28	
4	Atletic Bradu	20	4	7	9	23	39	−16	19	
5	Zagon	20	5	4	11	16	24	−8	19	
6	Câmpina	20	3	1	16	10	45	−35	10	

Source: FRF (in Romanian)
Rules for classification: 1st points; 2nd head-to-head points; 3rd head-to-head goal difference; 4th head-to-head goals scored; 5th head-to-head away goals scored; 6th goal difference; 7th number of goals scored

== Play-out round ==
=== Series I ===
Pos	Team	Pld	W	D	L	GF	GA	GD	Pts	Relegation
7	Aerostar Bacău	16	10	0	6	31	16	+15	30	
8	Moinești	16	9	0	7	28	23	+5	27	
9	Ceahlăul Piatra Neamț II	16	7	4	5	23	21	+2	25	
10	Bucovina Rădăuți (R)	16	6	3	7	19	24	−5	21	Relegation to Liga IV
11	Sporting Suceava (R)	16	4	1	11	19	36	−17	13	Relegation to Liga IV
12	FCM Bacău (Note: FCM Bacău withdrew in the first stage of the season.) (D)	0	0	0	0	0	0	0	0	Withdrew

Source: FRF (in Romanian)
Rules for classification: 1st points; 2nd head-to-head points; 3rd head-to-head goal difference; 4th head-to-head goals scored; 5th head-to-head away goals scored; 6th goal difference; 7th number of goals scored
(D) Disqualified; (R) Relegated

=== Series II ===
Pos	Team	Pld	W	D	L	GF	GA	GD	Pts	Relegation
7	Avântul Conpet Cireșu	18	9	4	5	42	32	+10	31	
8	Callatis Mangalia	18	10	1	7	36	34	+2	31	
9	Oțelul Galați II	18	8	6	4	33	25	+8	30	
10	Sporting Liești (R)	18	7	4	7	30	30	0	25	Relegation to Liga IV
11	Rapid Fetești (R)	18	3	5	10	16	31	−15	14	Relegation to Liga IV
12	Progresul Cernica (Note: Progresul Cernica withdrew in the first stage of the season.) (D)	10	3	0	7	9	19	−10	9	Withdrew

Source: FRF (in Romanian)
Rules for classification: 1st points; 2nd head-to-head points; 3rd head-to-head goal difference; 4th head-to-head goals scored; 5th head-to-head away goals scored; 6th goal difference; 7th number of goals scored
(D) Disqualified; (R) Relegated

=== Series III ===
Pos	Team	Pld	W	D	L	GF	GA	GD	Pts	Relegation
7	Dinamo București II	20	12	3	5	41	22	+19	39	
8	Tunari	20	9	6	5	39	32	+7	33	
9	Podari	20	8	6	6	27	23	+4	30	
10	Concordia Chiajna II (R)	20	6	5	9	23	26	−3	23	Relegation to Liga IV
11	Viitorul Municipal Craiova (R)	20	7	1	12	29	36	−7	22	Relegation to Liga IV
12	Viitorul Domnești (R)	20	5	5	10	16	36	−20	20	Relegation to Liga IV

Source: FRF (in Romanian)
Rules for classification: 1st points; 2nd head-to-head points; 3rd head-to-head goal difference; 4th head-to-head goals scored; 5th head-to-head away goals scored; 6th goal difference; 7th number of goals scored
(R) Relegated

=== Series IV ===
Pos	Team	Pld	W	D	L	GF	GA	GD	Pts	Relegation
7	Muncitorul Reșița	14	9	1	4	33	17	+16	28	
8	Reșița	14	6	4	4	15	9	+6	22	
9	Știința Turceni	14	4	5	5	16	20	−4	17	
10	Jiul Rovinari (R)	14	5	6	3	22	16	+6	7 (Note: Jiul Rovinari were deducted 14 points.)	Relegation to Liga IV
11	Avrig (Note: Avrig withtdrew in the first stage of the season.) (D)	8	0	0	8	1	25	−24	0	Excluded
12	Minerul Jilț Mătăsari (Note: Minerul Mătăsari withtdrew in the first stage of the season.) (D)	0	0	0	0	0	0	0	0	Excluded

Source: FRF (in Romanian)
Rules for classification: 1st points; 2nd head-to-head points; 3rd head-to-head goal difference; 4th head-to-head goals scored; 5th head-to-head away goals scored; 6th goal difference; 7th number of goals scored
(D) Disqualified; (R) Relegated

=== Series V ===
Pos	Team	Pld	W	D	L	GF	GA	GD	Pts	Relegation
7	Arieșul 1907 Turda	16	7	7	2	33	15	+18	28	
8	Unirea Jucu	16	8	3	5	28	27	+1	27	
9	Sănătatea Cluj	16	7	5	4	28	23	+5	26	
10	Zalău (R)	16	6	3	7	29	37	−8	21	Relegation to Liga IV
11	Unirea Dej (R)	16	2	2	12	17	33	−16	8	Relegation to Liga IV
12	Maramureș Universitar Baia Mare (Note: Maramureș Universitar Baia Mare withdrew in the first stage.)	0	0	0	0	0	0	0	0	Excluded

Source: FRF (in Romanian)
Rules for classification: 1st points; 2nd head-to-head points; 3rd head-to-head goal difference; 4th head-to-head goals scored; 5th head-to-head away goals scored; 6th goal difference; 7th number of goals scored
(R) Relegated

=== Series VI ===
Pos	Team	Pld	W	D	L	GF	GA	GD	Pts	Relegation
7	Târgoviște	18	10	4	4	28	20	+8	34	
8	Conpet Ploiești	18	7	7	4	26	17	+9	28	
9	Urban Titu	18	8	4	6	25	19	+6	28	
10	Păpăuți (R)	18	6	5	7	24	28	−4	23	Relegation to Liga IV
11	Avântul Reghin (R)	18	5	6	7	25	25	0	21	Relegation to Liga IV
12	Civitas Făgăraș (Note: Civitas Făgăraș withdrew in the first stage of the season.) (D)	10	0	2	8	5	24	−19	2	Excluded

Source: FRF (in Romanian)
Rules for classification: 1st points; 2nd head-to-head points; 3rd head-to-head goal difference; 4th head-to-head goals scored; 5th head-to-head away goals scored; 6th goal difference; 7th number of goals scored
(D) Disqualified; (R) Relegated

== See also ==
- 2013–14 Liga I
- 2013–14 Liga II
- 2013–14 Liga IV
- 2013–14 Cupa României
