= Alexandru Radu (footballer, born 1982) =

Romanian footballer

Personal information
- Date of birth: 7 September 1982 (age 44)
- Place of birth: Bucharest, Romania
- Height: 1.73 m (5 ft 8 in)
- Position: Midfielder

Senior career*
Years	Team	Apps	(Gls)
2002–2010	FC Snagov	91	(1)
2011–2012	Concordia Chiajna	16	(3)
2012–2014	Berceni	37	(1)
2015	Viitorul Axintele		
2015–2016	Berceni	27	(1)
2016–2017	SC Popești-Leordeni		
2017–2018	Sportul Snagov	41	(2)
Total		212	(8)

Managerial career
- 2018–2019: Sportul Snagov (fitness coach)
- 2019: Metaloglobus București (fitness coach)
- 2019–2022: UTA Arad (fitness coach)
- 2022: Universitatea Craiova (fitness coach)
- 2022–2023: UTA Arad (fitness coach)
- 2024: Petrolul Ploiești (fitness coach)
- 2025–2026: Oțelul Galați (fitness coach)
- * Club domestic league appearances and goals

Alexandru Radu (born 7 September 1982) is a Romanian former professional footballer who played as a midfielder.

== Honours ==
FC Snagov

- Liga III: 2005–06, 2007–08

Berceni

- Liga III: 2012–13
