= Nistor =

Nistor is a Romanian male given name and surname. Individuals with this name include:

- Nistor Grozavu
- Nistor Văidean
- Constantin Nistor (disambiguation), two athletes
- Dan Nistor (born 1988), Romanian footballer
- Ion Nistor (1876–1962), Romanian historian and politician
- Steliana Nistor (born 1989), Romanian gymnast
- Steven Nistor (born 1979), American drummer

== See also ==
- Nistorești (disambiguation)
