= Ionuț Constantin =

Romanian footballer (born 2001)

Personal information
- Date of birth: 27 July 2001 (age 25)
- Place of birth: Bolintin-Deal, Romania
- Position: Midfielder

Team information
- Current team: Concordia II Chiajna
- Number: 97

Youth career
- Concordia Chiajna

Senior career*
Years	Team	Apps	(Gls)
2018–2020	Concordia Chiajna	1	(0)
2020–2022	Concordia II Chiajna	9	(2)
2022–	Concordia Chiajna	0	(0)
- * Club domestic league appearances and goals as of 30 April 2021

Ionuț Constantin (born 27 July 2001) is a Romanian professional footballer who plays as a midfielder for Concordia II Chiajna. He made his debut in Liga I on 2 June 2019, in a match between Gaz Metan Mediaș and Concordia Chiajna, ended with the score of 3–1.
