= Rădescu =

Rădescu is a surname found in Romania. Notable people with this surname include:

- Ionuț Rădescu (born 1995), a Romanian football player
- Nicolae Rădescu (1874 – 1953), a Romanian army officer and politician
- Vlad Rădescu (born 1952), a Romanian actor
