= List of football clubs in Romania =

This is a list of football clubs in the top three leagues located in Romania and the divisions they play in.

== Liga I (Top tier) ==
- 2024–25 season

Club	City	Stadium	Capacity
Botoșani	Botoșani	Municipal (Botoșani)	7,782
CFR Cluj	Cluj	Dr. Constantin Rădulescu	22,198
Dinamo București	București	Arcul de Triumf	8,207
Farul Constanța	Constanța	Viitorul	4,554
FCSB	București	Arena Națională	55,634
Hermannstadt	Sibiu	Municipal (Sibiu)	12,363
Gloria Buzău	Buzău	Municipal (Buzău)	12,321
Oțelul Galați	Galați	Oțelul	12,363
Petrolul Ploiești	Ploiești	Ilie Oană	15,073
Politehnica Iași	Iași	Emil Alexandrescu	11,390
Rapid București	București	Rapid–Giulești	14,047
Sepsi OSK	Sfântu Gheorghe	Sepsi Arena	8,400
Unirea Slobozia	Slobozia	Clinceni Stadium (Note: Unirea Slobozia is currently relocated to Clinceni Stadium in Clinceni because Stadionul 1 Mai in Slobozia is under renovations.)	4,502
Universitatea Craiova	Craiova	Ion Oblemenco	30,983
Universitatea Cluj	Cluj	Cluj Arena	30,201
UTA Arad	Arad	Francisc von Neuman	11,500

== Liga II (Second tier) ==
- 2024–25 season

Club	City	Stadium	Capacity
1599 Șelimbăr	Șelimbăr	Măgura (Note: 1599 Șelimbăr is currently relocated to Măgura in Cisnădie.)	5,000
Afumați	Afumați	Comunal	3,000
Argeș Pitești	Pitești	Orășenesc (Note: Argeș Pitești is currently relocated to Orășenesc in Mioveni because Nicolae Dobrin Stadium in Pitești is under renovations.)	10,000
Bihor Oradea	Oradea	Iuliu Bodola	11,155
Câmpulung Muscel	Câmpulung	Muscelul	6,000 (3,000 seated)
Ceahlăul Piatra Neamț	Piatra Neamț	Ceahlăul	8,400
Chindia Târgoviște	Târgoviște	Eugen Popescu	8,400
Concordia Chiajna	Chiajna	Concordia	5,123
Corvinul Hunedoara	Hunedoara	Complex Sportiv Corvinul	16,500 (3,000 seated)
Csíkszereda Miercurea Ciuc	Miercurea Ciuc	Municipal (Miercurea Ciuc)	4,000
FC U Craiova 1948	Craiova	Complex Sportiv Craiova	30,983
CSM Focșani	Focșani	Milcovul	8,500
CSM Reșița	Reșița	Mircea Chivu	12,500
CSM Slatina	Slatina	1 Mai	10,000 (6,500 seated)
Dumbrăvița	Craiova	Ștefan Dobay	1,000 (500 seated)
Metaloglobus București	Cluj	Metaloglobus	1,000
Metalul Buzău	Buzău	Metalul	1,606
Mioveni	Mioveni	Orășenesc	10,000
Steaua București	București	Steaua	31,254
Unirea Ungheni	Ungheni	Central	2,000
Viitorul Târgu Jiu	Târgu Jiu	Constantina Diță-Tomescu	12,518
Voluntari	Voluntari	Anghel Iordănescu	4,600

== Liga III (Third tier) ==
- 2024–25 season

=== Series I ===
- Bucovina Rădăuți
- Ceahlăul Piatra Neamț II
- CSM Bacău
- CSM Vaslui
- FC Bacău
- Gloria Ultra
- Știința Miroslava
- Șoimii
- Șomuz Fălticeni
- USV Iași

=== Series II ===
- CSM Adjud
- Aerostar Bacău
- Unirea Braniștea
- Dacia Unirea Brăila
- KSE Târgu Secuiesc
- Sporting Liești
- Voința Limpeziș
- Viitorul Onești
- CSM Râmnicu Sărat
- Sepsi OSK II

=== Series III ===
- Agricola Borcea
- Axiopolis Cernavodă
- Gloria Băneasa
- Dunărea Călărași
- CSM Fetești
- Progresul Fundulea
- CS Medgidia
- Înainte Modelu
- Popești-Leordeni
- Recolta Gheorghe Doja

=== Series IV ===
- Alexandria
- CS Dinamo București
- Cetatea Turnu Măgurele
- LPS HD Clinceni
- Oltul Curtișoara
- Dunărea Giurgiu
- Petrolul Potcoava
- Progresul Spartac București
- Sporting Roșiori
- Vedița Colonești

=== Series V ===
- ACS FC Dinamo București
- Blejoi
- Flacăra Moreni
- Păulești
- Petrolul Ploiești II
- Pucioasa
- Sport Team
- Ștefănești
- Tunari
- Urban Titu

=== Series VI ===
- Băicoi
- Ciucaș Tărlungeni
- Gheorgheni
- Kids Tâmpa Brașov
- Odorheiu Secuiesc
- Plopeni
- Olimpic Cetate Râșnov
- SR Brașov
- Tricolorul Breaza
- Olimpic Zărnești

=== Series VII ===
- Avântul Reghin
- CIL Blaj
- Codlea
- CSU Alba Iulia
- Gloria Bistrița-Năsăud
- Mediaș
- Metalurgistul Cugir
- MSE Târgu Mureș 1898
- Unirea Alba Iulia
- Unirea Dej

=== Series VIII ===
- ARO Muscelul Câmpulung
- Unirea Bascov
- Viitorul Dăești
- Vulturii Fărcășești
- Filiași
- Gilortul Târgu Cărbunești
- Jiul Petroșani
- SCM Râmnicu Vâlcea
- Sparta Râmnicu Vâlcea
- Speed Academy Pitești

=== Series IX ===
- Gloria Lunca-Teuz Cermei
- Ghiroda
- Lotus Băile Felix
- Minerul Lupeni
- Progresul Pecicaa
- Peciu Nou
- Avântul Periam
- Politehnica Timișoara
- Timișul Șag
- Viitorul Arad

=== Series V ===
- CSM Olimpia Satu Mare
- Diosig Bihardiószeg
- Minaur Baia Mare
- Vulturul Mintiu Gherlii
- Olimpia MCMXXI
- Sănătatea Cluj
- Crișul Sântandrei
- CSM Sighetu Marmației
- Viitorul Cluj
- SCM Zalău

== See also ==
- List of football clubs in Romania by county
- List of minor Romanian football clubs
- List of football stadiums in Romania
- Sport in Romania
