= Alexandru Stan =

Romanian footballer

Personal information
- Full name: Alexandru Constantin Stan
- Date of birth: 7 February 1989 (age 37)
- Place of birth: Bucharest, Romania
- Height: 1.75 m (5 ft 9 in)
- Position: Left back

Team information
- Current team: Tunari
- Number: 77

Youth career
- 2002–2007: LPS "Sf.Pantelimon" București

Senior career*
Years	Team	Apps	(Gls)
2007–2008	Dodu București	10	(1)
2007–2008	Progresul București	30	(3)
2009–2012	Astra Ploiești	58	(2)
2010–2012	→ Astra II Giurgiu	3	(0)
2012	Turnu Severin	0	(0)
2013–2014	Berceni	24	(6)
2014–2015	Concordia Chiajna	24	(0)
2015–2018	Astra Giurgiu	75	(2)
2018–2021	FCSB	10	(0)
2021–2022	Politehnica Iași	17	(1)
2022–2023	Tunari	?	(?)
2023–	Rapid Buzescu	0	(0)
- * Club domestic league appearances and goals as of 11:44, 22 June 2022 (UTC)

Alexandru Constantin Stan (born 7 February 1989) is a Romanian footballer who plays as a left back for CS Tunari. In his career, Stan also played for teams such as Progresul București, Astra Ploiești or Concordia Chiajna, among others.

== Career statistics ==
=== Club ===
As of 1 August 2019

Club	Season	League		Cup		League Lup		Europe		Other		Total	
Club	Season	Apps	Goals	Apps	Goals	Apps	Goals	Apps	Goals	Apps	Goals	Apps	Goals
Berceni	2007–08	10	1	0	0	–		–		–		10	1
Berceni	2012–13	0	0	1	0	–		–		–		1	0
Berceni	2013–14	24	6	1	1	–		–		–		25	7
Total		34	7	2	1	–	–	–	–	–	–	36	8
Progresul București	2007–08	17	0	0	0	–		–		–		17	0
Progresul București	2008–09	13	3	0	0	–		–		–		13	3
Total		30	3	0	0	–	–	–	–	–	–	30	3
Astra Giurgiu	2009–10	21	1	0	0	–		–		–		21	1
Astra Giurgiu	2010–11	19	1	0	0	–		–		–		19	1
Astra Giurgiu	2011–12	18	0	0	0	–		–		–		18	0
Astra Giurgiu	2015–16	12	1	2	0	3	0	2	0	–		19	1
Astra Giurgiu	2016–17	28	0	4	0	1	0	7	1	0	0	40	1
Astra Giurgiu	2017–18	31	1	2	0	–		4	0	–		37	1
Astra Giurgiu	2018–19	4	0	–		–		–		–		4	0
Total		133	4	8	0	4	0	13	1	0	0	158	5
Astra II Ploiești	2010–11	2	0	0	0	–		–		–		2	0
Astra II Ploiești	2011–12	1	0	0	0	–		–		–		1	0
Total		3	0	0	0	–	–	–	–	–	–	3	0
Concordia Chiajna	2014–15	24	0	1	0	1	0	–		–		26	0
FCSB	2018–19	10	0	1	0	–		2	0	–		13	0
FCSB	2019–20	0	0	0	0	–		1	0	–		1	0
Total		10	0	1	0	–	–	3	0	–	–	14	0
Career total		234	14	12	1	5	0	16	1	0	0	267	16

== Honours ==
=== Club ===
Astra Giurgiu

- Liga I (1): 2015–16

FCSB

- Cupa României: 2019–20
