= CS Nuova Mama Mia Becicherecu Mic =

Romanian football club

Nuova Mama Mia Becicherecu Mic
- Full name: Clubul Sportiv Nuova Mama Mia Becicherecu Mic
- Nickname: Pizzerii (The Pizzerias)
- Short name: Mama Mia
- Founded: 2002
- Dissolved: 2018
- Ground: Árpád Thierjung
- Capacity: 1,000
Home colours	Away colours

Nuova Mama Mia Becicherecu Mic was a Romanian professional football club from Jimbolia, Timiș County, Romania, originally from Becicherecu Mic.

== History ==
The club was founded in 2002 in the Liga V – Timiș and managed to promote to the Liga III for the first time in their history in 2007, after they won Liga IV-Timiș. They are well known for being the club with the longest name from the national football leagues of Romania. In 2012 they relegated to Liga IV, but managed to return in the Liga III after only one year.

The team moved from Becicherecu Mic to Timișoara in the summer of 2015, but after a few time the club return to its home location until the end of the 2015–16 Liga III season. In the spring of 2016 the club was bought by a Romanian businessman from the United States, George Sîngeorzan, who moved, in the summer of 2016, the club again to Timișoara and played for four months on the same CFR Stadium like in 2015. In January 2017, the new owner moved again the club, now, from Timișoara to Jimbolia where they started a collaboration with Marcel Băban Football Academy, a well known youth academy in Romania.

== Honours ==
- Liga III
  - Runners-up (2): 2013–14, 2014–15
- Liga IV – Timiș County
  - Winners (2): 2006–07, 2012–13
