= Laurențiu Tudor (footballer, born 1976) =

Romanian footballer and manager

Personal information
- Full name: Florin Laurențiu Tudor
- Date of birth: 17 June 1976 (age 50)
- Place of birth: Bucharest, Romania
- Height: 1.75 m (5 ft 9 in)
- Position: Defender

Team information
- Current team: Ștefănești (assistant)

Managerial career
- Years: Team
- 2011: Râmnicu Vâlcea
- 2012: FC Snagov
- 2012–2013: Râmnicu Vâlcea
- 2013–2014: Ștefănești
- 2014: FC Costuleni
- 2015: Flota Świnoujście
- 2015–2016: Ștefănești
- 2016: Unirea Tărlungeni
- 2019: Sportul Snagov
- 2022–2024: Ștefănești
- 2024–: Ștefănești (assistant)

Florin Laurențiu Tudor (born 17 June 1976) is a Romanian professional football manager and former footballer.
