= Ogrezeni =

- Commune
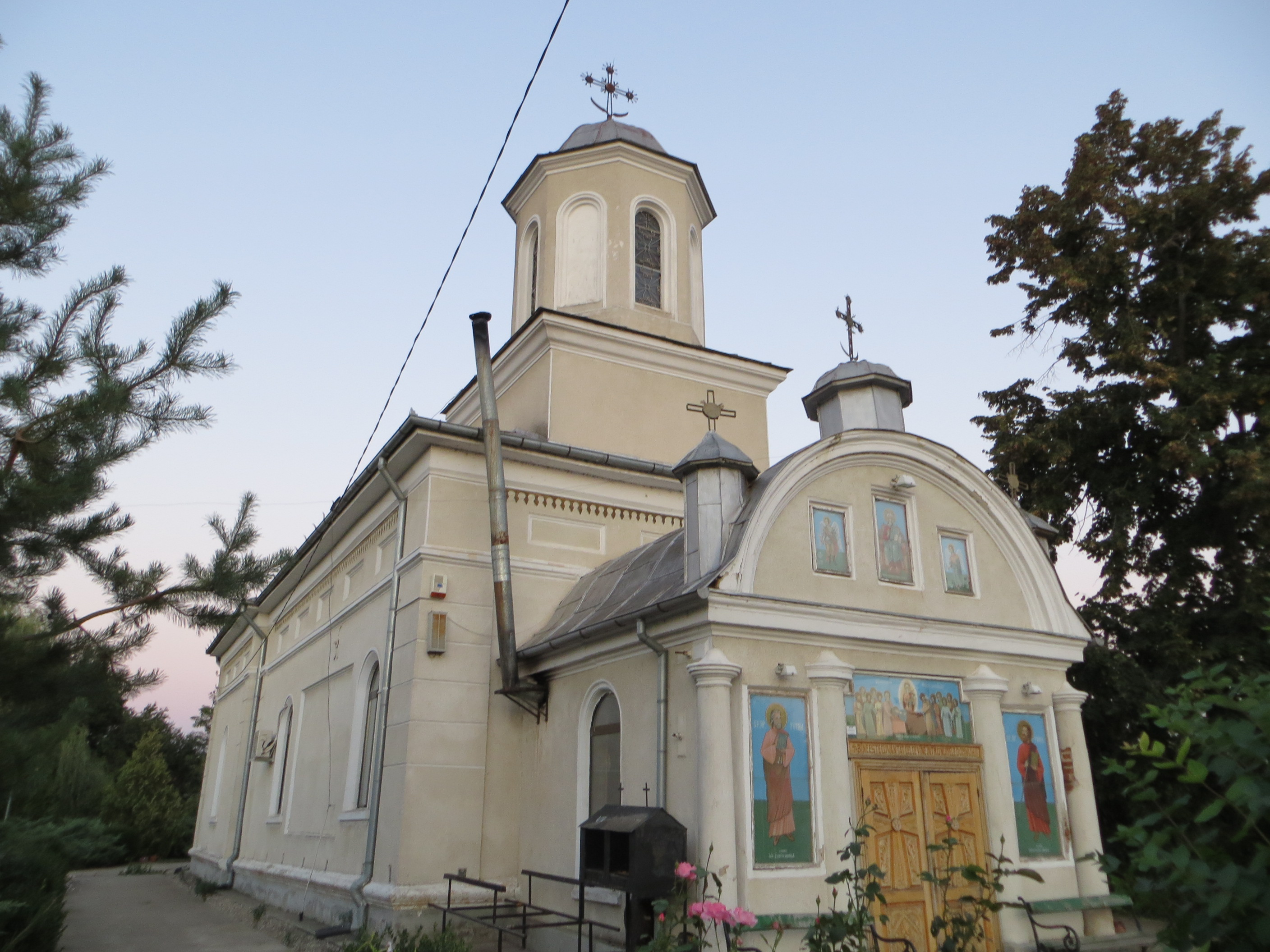
- Emilian of Durostorum church in Ogrezeni

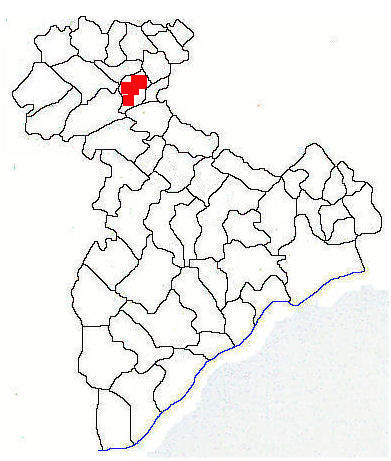
- Location in Giurgiu County

- Location in Romania
- Coordinates: 44°25′N 25°46′E
- Country: Romania
- County: Giurgiu

Government
  - Mayor (2020–2024): Jan-Cătălin Preda (PSD)
- Area: 56.75 km^{2} (21.91 sq mi)
- Elevation: 103 m (338 ft)
- Population (2021-12-01): 4,375
  - Density: 77.09/km^{2} (199.7/sq mi)
- Time zone: UTC+02:00 (EET)
  - Summer (DST): UTC+03:00 (EEST)
- Postal code: 87170
- Area code: +(40) 246
- Vehicle reg.: GR
- Website: www.primariaogrezeni.ro

Ogrezeni is a commune located in Giurgiu County, Muntenia, Romania. It is composed of two villages, Hobaia and Ogrezeni.

Historical population
Year	Pop.	±%
2002	4,974	—
2011	4,906	−1.4%
2021	4,375	−10.8%
Source: Census data

== Natives ==
- Marin Dună (born 1967), footballer
