= Constantin Nistor =

Constantin Nistor may refer to:

- Constantin Nistor (footballer) (born 1991), Romanian football player
- Constantin Nistor (ice hockey) (born 1954), former Romanian ice hockey player
