= Nistorești (disambiguation) =

Nistoreşti may refer to several places in Romania:

- Nistorești, a commune in Vrancea County
- Nistoreşti, a village in Cozieni Commune, Buzău County
- Nistoreşti, a village in Pantelimon Commune, Constanţa County
- Nistoreşti, a village in Alimpești Commune, Gorj County
- Nistoreşti, a village in Breaza Town, Prahova County

== See also ==
- Nistor (disambiguation)
