= Stadionul CFR (Timișoara) =

Romanian stadium

CFR Stadium
- Stadionul CFR
- Interactive map of CFR Stadium
- Former names: Banatul Stadium (1933–1945)
- Location: Timișoara, Romania
- Coordinates: 45.7538595°N 21.21052°E
- Capacity: 7,000
- Surface: Grass

Construction
- Built: 1913
- Renovated: 2005
- Rebuilt: 1949

Tenants
- Chinezul Timișoara (1913–1946); CFR Timişoara (1933–present); Nuova Mama Mia (2015; 2016–2017)

CFR Stadium (Romanian: Stadionul CFR) is a multi-purpose stadium in Timișoara, Romania. It is currently used mostly for football matches and is the home ground of CFR Timișoara. The stadium holds 7,000 people.

It was also the home ground of Chinezul Timișoara and CA Timișoara, which was named Stadionul Banatul at that time.

== History ==
Inaugurated in 1913, the Banatul Stadium occupied the land of the current stadium until World War II. In 1944, the stadium was destroyed by Allied bombings, which also destroyed the neighboring Domnița Elena railway station. A new stadium was rebuilt by CFR employees five years later. It was officially inaugurated on 17 October 1949, on the occasion of a friendly match between CFR Timisoara and MATEOSz Budapest. Until 1964, in the opening of football games, rugby was played here.

In 2020, during the COVID-19 pandemic, the authorities built a modular hospital here, as a section of the Military Hospital, intended exclusively for the treatment of COVID-19 patients. In 2021, the stadium hosted an eight-day COVID-19 vaccination marathon.
