= Stadionul Comunal (Pojorâta) =

Stadium in Pojorâta, Romania

- Location: Pojorâta, Romania
- Owner: Pojorâta Commune
- Operator: FC Pojorâta
- Capacity: 1,000
- Surface: grass

Construction
- Opened: 1950
- Renovated: 2013, 2015

Tenant
- FC Pojorâta (1950–2020)

Stadionul Comunal is a multi-use stadium in Pojorâta, Romania. It is used mostly for football matches and was the home ground of FC Pojorâta. The stadium holds 1,000 people.
