= Epaminonda Nicu =

Romanian footballer

Personal information
- Date of birth: 17 December 1979 (age 46)
- Place of birth: Bucharest, Romania
- Height: 1.80 m (5 ft 11 in)
- Position: Right back

Team information
- Current team: Progresul 2005 București

Senior career*
Years	Team	Apps	(Gls)
2003–2011	Unirea Urziceni	192	(8)
2011–2013	FCM Târgu Mureș	43	(1)
2013–2016	Berceni	84	(5)
2016–2017	Unirea Tărlungeni	17	(1)
2017–2018	Venus Independența		
2018–	Progresul 2005 București		

Managerial career
- 2015: Berceni
- * Club domestic league appearances and goals as of 21 February 2017

Epaminonda Nicu (born 17 December 1979) is a Romanian football player who plays for Liga IV side Progresul 2005 București.

== Titles ==
Season	Club	Title
2008–09	Unirea Urziceni	Liga I
