= Romeo Pădureț =

Romanian footballer

Personal information
- Date of birth: 17 October 1974 (age 52)
- Place of birth: Bucharest, Romania
- Height: 1.72 m (5 ft 8 in)
- Positions: Central midfielder; defender

Senior career*
Years	Team	Apps	(Gls)
1992–2003	Sportul Studențesc București	217	(36)
1995–1996	→ Voința București (loan)		
2004	Steaua București	11	(0)
2004	Universitatea Craiova	1	(0)
2005	FC Caracal	14	(0)
2005	Gloria Bistrița	8	(0)
2006–2008	FC Snagov		
2008–2011	CS Ștefănești		
Total		251	(36)
- * Club domestic league appearances and goals

Romeo Pădureț (born 17 October 1974) is a Romanian former footballer who played as a midfielder and defender.

== Honours ==
Sportul Studențesc București

- Divizia B: 2000–01, 2003–04

FC Snagov

- Divizia C: 2005–06, 2007–08
