= Marin Dună =

Romanian footballer

Personal information
- Date of birth: 2 August 1967 (age 59)
- Place of birth: Ogrezeni, Romania
- Height: 1.77 m (5 ft 10 in)
- Position: Forward

Youth career
- –1986: Progresul București

Senior career*
Years	Team	Apps	(Gls)
1986–1999	Național București	206	(80)
1995	→ Steaua București (loan)	1	(0)
1998	→ Logroñés (loan)	18	(0)
2000–2002	Astra Ploieşti	77	(9)
2003	Metalul Plopeni	9	(3)
2003–2004	Internațional Pitești	6	(0)
Total		317	(92)

Managerial career
- 2005: Astra Ploieşti
- 2006: Progresul București
- 2007: Dacia Mioveni
- 2007–2008: Prefab Modelu
- 2010–2011: Victoria II Brănești
- 2011–2012: Victoria Brănești
- 2012–2013: Unirea Slobozia
- 2014–2015: Ștefănești
- 2015–2016: Voința Snagov
- 2016: Concordia II Chiajna (assistant)
- 2016: Concordia Chiajna (assistant)
- 2017: Universitatea Craiova (assistant)
- 2018: Concordia II Chiajna
- 2018–2019: CS Progresul (technical director)
- 2019–2021: Academica Clinceni (assistant)
- 2021–2022: Gaz Metan Mediaș (assistant)
- 2022: Gaz Metan Mediaș (caretaker)
- 2022: UTA Arad (assistant)
- 2023–2024: Voluntari (assistant)
- 2024: Concordia Chiajna (assistant)
- 2024: Voluntari (assistant)
- * Club domestic league appearances and goals

Marin Dună (born 2 August 1967) is a former Romanian professional footballer and currently a manager.

== Honours ==
=== Player ===
Național București

- Divizia B: 1991–92
- Cupa României runner-up: 1996–97

Steaua București

- Supercupa României: 1995
