= FC Păpăuți =

- Full name: Fotbal Club Păpăuți
- Nicknames: Păpăuțenii (The people from Păpăuți)
- Short name: Păpăuți
- Founded: 2000; 26 years ago
- Ground: Comunal
- Capacity: 800
- Owner: Zagon Commune
- Chairman: Csaba Benedek
- Manager: Attila Kelemen
- League: Liga IV
- 2025–26: Liga IV, Covasna County 11th of 15
Home colours	Away colours

Fotbal Club Păpăuți, commonly known as FC Păpăuți, or simply as Păpăuți, is a Romanian football club based in Păpăuți, near Zagon, Covasna County. The club currently competes in Liga IV - Covasna County, the fourth tier of the Romanian football. At their best the club finished 10th in 2013–14 Liga III and reached the Second round of Cupa României in 2017–18 season.

== History ==
FC Păpăuți was founded in 2000 and played mostly in the amateur leagues. Păpăuți won the 2008–09 Liga V – Covasna County season promoting for the first time to the fourth tier.

The club promoted to Liga III at the end of 2012–13 season, winning the Liga IV – Covasna County eight points ahead of Sepsi OSK and thrashing FC Râșnov, the winner of Liga IV – Brașov County, in the promotion play-off 7–1 on neutral ground at Porumbenii Mari.

In the first season in Liga III, Păpăuți avoided relegation finishing 10th in Series VI, but in the next season was excluded from third league after 11 rounds due to non-payment of arbitration scales.

== Rivalries ==
The club had a local rivalry with FC Zagon, where they played in Liga IV and Liga III, until 2015 when Păpăuți was excluded from the league. One year later Zagon withdrew from the third league and was dissolved.

== Honours ==
Liga IV – Covasna County

- Winners (1): 2012–13
- Runners-up (3): 2017–18, 2018–19, 2019–20

Liga V – Covasna County

- Winners (1): 2008–09

Cupa României – Covasna County

- Winners (3): 2015–16, 2016–17, 2018–19
