= CS Concordia II Chiajna =

Romanian football club

Concordia Chiajna II
- Full name: Clubul Sportiv Concordia Chiajna II
- Nickname: Micii Vulturi (The Little Eagles)
- Short name: Concordia II
- Founded: 2008; 2020 (refounded)
- Dissolved: 2021
- Ground: Concordia / Roșu
- Capacity: 5,123 / 3,000
Home colours	Away colours	Third colours

Clubul Sportiv Concordia Chiajna, commonly known as Concordia Chiajna II, was a Romanian professional football club founded in 2008 and based in Chiajna, Ilfov County and was the reserve squad of Romanian second league side, Concordia Chiajna.

The team was founded in the summer of 2008 in order to have a team of seniors where the players who just finished the youth academy can be accommodated with the level of seniors in the idea of being subsequently promoted to the first team. The team was enrolled in Liga IV Bucharest where it remained only for two seasons, subsequently buying a place in the third tier. In the summer of 2018, after seven seasons spent in the third tier, "the Little Eagles" withdrew from the league, but just to be enrolled back in 2020.

== Honours ==
Liga IV Bucharest

- Runners-up (1): 2010–11

== Former managers ==
- (Romania) Silviu Mărculescu
- (Romania) Ionuț Voicu (2013)
- (Romania) Ștefan Crăciun (2014)

== League and cup history ==
Season	Tier	League	Place	Notes	Cupa României
2020–21	3	Liga III	9th (Series IV)	Relegated	
2015–16	3	Liga III	6th (Series III)		Third round
2014–15	3	Liga III	3rd (Series III)		
2013–14	3	Liga III	10th (Series III)	Spared from relegation	
2012–13	3	Liga III	12th (Series III)	Spared from relegation	
2011–12	3	Liga III	7th (Series III)		
