= CS Podgoria Pâncota =

Romanian football club

Podgoria Pâncota
- Full name: Clubul Sportiv Podgoria Pâncota
- Nicknames: Viticultorii (Grape Growers); Pâncotanii (The People of Pâncota); Șoimii (The Hawks)
- Short name: Podgoria
- Founded: 1923; 103 years ago as Spartak Pâncota
- Ground: Șoimii
- Capacity: 2,000
- Owner: Pâncota Town
- Chairman: Sergiu Dragalina
- Manager: Remus Lung
- League: Liga IV
- 2025–26: Liga IV, Arad County, 4th of 13
Home colours	Away colours

Clubul Sportiv Podgoria Pâncota is a Romanian professional football club based in Pâncota, Arad County, Romania, founded in 1923, under the name of Spartak Pâncota. The club is currently a member of the Liga IV – Arad County, fourth tier of the Romanian football league system. The best period of the team based in Arad County was during the first part of the 2010s, when it reached the second division, under the name of Șoimii Pâncota.

== History ==
=== Early years ===
The first document dates from 1923, at that time the team was called Spartak Pâncota. The team played in a landscaped garden on the site of the markets and the colors were green and white and played in the Western League with similar teams from Șiria, Lipova, Salonta, Arad, etc. Representative members of the batch at the time were: Beszeny, Vagalau, Cornel Vuia, Stark, Schmidth, Chebeleu, Hipp, Pohaner, Badovics, Ardelean, Coroban. In 1938, at the initiative of players the club changed its name from Spartak to Șoimii (The Falcons).

After the Second World War, the team played constantly in the Arad District Championship on the current stadium, named after the club.

In the 1967–68 season, with Simion Buda and Iosif Retter among the players, Șoimii won the Arad District Championship and promoted to Arad County Championship.

Pâncotanii had a period of force after the Romanian Revolution, finishing 1st in Series B of the 1991–92 season beating Aurul Negru Pecica in the championship final 3–1 on aggregate, but missed out on promotion after finishing last in Group X of the promotion play-off behind to Venus Lugoj and Minerul Oravița.

The 1997–98 season, saw Șoimii winning again the County Championship and promoted to Divizia C after won the promotion play-off against Gilortul Târgu Cărbunești 2–1 at Cetate Stadium in Deva. The squad coached by Alexandru Gaica was composed amongst others by Tentu - Grăpan, Crișan, Damian, Folea, Ianoș, Cioarcă, Șofronoci, Burtea, Bulzan, Morar, Dan Cuedan, Blăniță and Igna.

However, due to the financial problems, The Falcons continued to play in the fourth division after ceded its place to Inter Arad. In the following seasons the best result was obtained in the 1999–2000 season, when finished on 2nd place 11 points behind Motorul Astra Arad.

Meanwhile, in the summer of 2005, the club was renamed as CNM Pâncota finishing 4th in the 2005–06 season.

The Falcons won the 2006–07 season of Liga IV – Arad County, but lost the promotion play-off against Turul Micula, the winner of Liga IV – Satu Mare County, 0–1 at Municipal Stadium in Oradea. The team coached by Mihai Roșca was composed of Dulhaz - Pleșescu, Lengyel, Iancu, Moțiu, Mager, D.Lengyel, Szeleki, Pantea, Mihai, Drăgui Pașca, Gâlcă and Burian.

=== Top leagues ===
Șoimii Pâncota promoted to the third league after 2011–12 successful season, finishing first in Liga IV Arad and winning the promotion play-off against CSM Vulcan. Also won the Romanian Cup county phase.

At the end of 2013–14 Liga III, they finished 1st promoting for the first time ever in Liga II. In their first season in second league they finished at 9th place on the table.

At the end of the 2015–16 Liga II season, Șoimii saved from the relegation instead of teams with tradition in Romanian football, like Universitatea Cluj or FC Bihor Oradea, but in the summer of 2016, after Pâncota Municipality withdrew their financial support and forced the team to leave the stadium, the club was seen in the situation of not being able to continue the activity. Then in the last minute before the start of the championship, Pavel Piroș, the president of the club, decided to present at the matches with youth players. As a result, they managed to get some of the biggest counter-performance of Romanian football, 0–18 against Juventus București, 0–16 against CS Afumați and 0–14 against Foresta Suceava.

The club was re-organized in 2016, under a new name, Podgoria Pâncota and enrolled in the lowest division.

== Honours ==
Liga III

- Winners (1): 2013–14

Liga IV – Arad County

- Winners (4): 1991–92, 1997–98, 2006–07, 2011–12
- Runners-up (3): 1999–2000, 2007–08, 2009–10

Arad District Championship

- Winners (1): 1967–68

Cupa României – Arad County

- Runners-up (2): 2015–16, 2017–18

=== Other performances ===
- Appearances in Liga II: 3
- Best finish in Liga II: 8th (2015–16)
- Best finish in the Cupa României: Round of 32 (2012–13, 2014–15)

== League history ==
Season	Tier	Division	Place	Notes	Cupa României
2024–25	4	Liga IV (AR)	TBD		
2023–24	4	Liga IV (AR)	7th		
2022–23	4	Liga IV (AR)	8th		
2021–22	4	Liga IV (AR)	5th		
2020–21	Not active due to the COVID-19 pandemic in Romania				
2019–20	4	Liga IV (AR)	11th		
2016–17	2	Liga II	20th	Relegated	
2015–16	2	Liga II (Seria II)	8th		
2014–15	2	Liga II (Seria II)	9th		Round of 32
2013–14	3	Liga III (Seria V)	1st (C)	Promoted	

Season	Tier	Division	Place	Notes	Cupa României
2012–13	3	Liga III (Seria V)	4th		Round of 32
2011–12	4	Liga IV (AR)	1st (C)	Promoted	
2010–11	4	Liga IV (AR)	5th		
2009–10	4	Liga IV (AR)	2nd		
2008–09	4	Liga IV (AR)	3rd		
2007–08	4	Liga IV (AR)	2nd		
2006–07	4	Liga IV (AR)	1st (C)		
2005–06	4	Liga IV (AR)	4th		
2004–05	4	Liga IV (AR)	14th		
2003–04	4	Liga IV (AR)	11th		

== Former managers ==
- (Romania) Ionuț Popa (2015–2016)
- (Romania) Zsolt Muzsnay (2016)
