= Stadionul Municipal (Caransebeș) =

Romanian stadium

- Parcul Teiuș
- Interactive map of Stadionul Municipal
- Former names: Stadionul 1 Mai
- Address: Str. Arinilor
- Location: Caransebeș, Romania
- Coordinates: 45°24′41.8″N 22°12′18.9″E
- Owner: Municipality of Caransebeș
- Operator: Progresul Ezeriș
- Capacity: 3,000 seated
- Surface: Grass

Construction
- Renovated: 2014

Tenants
- Viitorul Caransebeș (2014–2019); Progresul Ezeriș (2020–present)

Stadionul Municipal is a multi-purpose stadium in Caransebeș, Romania. It is currently used mostly for football matches, is the home ground of Progresul Ezeriș and has a capacity of 3,000 seats.
