= 2012–13 Liga III =

57th season of the Liga III

Liga III
- Season: 2012–13

The 2012–13 Liga III season is the 57th season of the Liga III, the third tier of the Romanian football league system. Day one was played on August 31, 2012 and the last round was played on May 30, 2013. The first team in each series will promote at the end of the season to the Liga II, and the teams that finish 10-16 will relegate to the Liga IV. From the teams that finish 9th, another three are relegated, but separate standings are computed, only results against teams that finished 1-8 are taken into consideration.

This season was close to a disaster, only 78 teams registered, although 96 spots were available (6x16), thus 18 spots remained unoccupied. From the 78, 5 withdrew from the championship during the first half, CSO Plopeni, Sevișul Șelimbăr, Oltchim Râmnicu Vâlcea, FCM Huși and FC Cisnădie, thus 73 remained in the tables.

During the second half of the championship another 7 teams withdrew, only 66 teams remained out of 96 spots. This teams were: Young Stars Panciu, Rapid București II, Eolica Baia, CSM Focșani, Jiul Petroșani, FCM Turda and Girom Albota.

== League tables ==
=== Seria I ===
Pos	Team	Pld	W	D	L	GF	GA	GD	Pts	Promotion or relegation
1	SC Bacău (C, P)	22	15	4	3	49	19	+30	49	Promotion to Liga II
2	Dorohoi	22	13	3	6	40	16	+24	42	
3	Moinești	22	12	4	6	51	44	+7	40	
4	Kosarom Pașcani	22	10	4	8	25	21	+4	34	
5	Sporting Suceava	22	10	3	9	31	26	+5	33 (Note: OTE 0-2 SPO; SPO 4–2 OTE)	
6	Oțelul Galați II	22	9	6	7	40	33	+7	33	
7	Petrotub Roman	22	10	2	10	35	30	+5	32 (Note: PET 4-0 BUC; BUC 1–4 PET)	
8	Bucovina Rădăuți	22	10	2	10	23	33	−10	32	
9	Aerostar Bacău	22	9	2	11	28	35	−7	29	
10	Știința Miroslava (R)	22	6	6	10	30	34	−4	24	Relegation to Liga IV
11	Ceahlăul Piatra Neamț II (R)	22	6	1	15	25	41	−16	19	Relegation to Liga IV
12	Young Stars Panciu (Note: Young Stars Panciu withdrew from the championship during the winter half and lost all remaining matches with 0–3. It also was penalised two points.) (R)	22	3	1	18	6	51	−45	8	Relegation to Liga IV

Source: FRF (in Romanian)
Rules for classification: 1st points; 2nd head-to-head points; 3rd head-to-head goal difference; 4th head-to-head goals scored; 5th head-to-head away goals scored; 6th goal difference; 7th number of goals scored
(C) Champions; (P) Promoted; (R) Relegated

=== Seria II ===
Pos	Team	Pld	W	D	L	GF	GA	GD	Pts	Promotion or relegation
1	Gloria Buzău (C, P)	24	17	1	6	50	16	+34	52	Promotion to Liga II
2	Viitorul Axintele (Note: Viitorul Axintele, Victoria Chirnogi and Rapid Fetești were penalised 9 points each by the FRF because they broke the rules, by not having three youth squads registered.)	24	20	1	3	64	14	+50	52	
3	Metaloglobus București	24	15	2	7	52	26	+26	47	
4	Râmnicu Sărat	24	12	4	8	37	26	+11	40 (Note: DUN 3–2 RAM; RAM 1–0 DUN)	
5	Dunărea Călăraşi	24	12	4	8	50	34	+16	40	
6	Juventus București	24	10	6	8	33	21	+12	36	
7	Urban Titu	24	8	7	9	35	23	+12	31	
8	Victoria Chirnogi	24	10	8	6	48	39	+9	29	
9	Rapid Fetești (R)	24	10	3	11	31	44	−13	24	Relegation to Liga IV
10	Rapid București II (Note: Rapid București II withdrew from the championship during the winter half and lost all remaining matches with 0–3.) (R)	22	7	1	14	33	48	−15	22	Relegation to Liga IV
11	Sportul Studenţesc București II (R)	24	5	0	19	25	81	−56	15	Relegation to Liga IV
12	Focșani (Note: CSM Focșani withdrew from the championship during the winter half and lost all remaining matches with 0–3.) (R)	22	4	2	16	12	54	−42	14	Relegation to Liga IV
13	Eolica Baia (Note: Eolica Baia withdrew from the championship during the winter half and lost all remaining matches with 0–3. It also was penalised two points.) (R)	22	3	1	18	18	62	−44	8	Relegation to Liga IV

Source: FRF (in Romanian)
Rules for classification: 1st points; 2nd head-to-head points; 3rd head-to-head goal difference; 4th head-to-head goals scored; 5th head-to-head away goals scored; 6th goal difference; 7th number of goals scored
(C) Champions; (P) Promoted; (R) Relegated

=== Seria III ===
Pos	Team	Pld	W	D	L	GF	GA	GD	Pts	Promotion or relegation
1	Berceni (C, P)	24	18	3	3	52	22	+30	57	Promotion to Liga II
2	Caracal	24	12	6	6	32	20	+12	42	
3	Balotești	24	12	5	7	37	23	+14	41	
4	Inter Clinceni	24	10	5	9	27	34	−7	35	
5	Ștefănești (Note: Ștefănești, Afumați, Vișina Nouă, Viitorul Domnești and Tunari were penalised 9 points each by the FRF because they broke the rules, by not having three youth squads registered.)	24	12	5	7	37	26	+11	32 (Note: PRO 0-2 STE; STE 1–0 PRO)	
6	Progresul Cernica	24	10	2	12	33	37	−4	32	
7	Voluntari	24	7	10	7	30	25	+5	31	
8	Afumați	24	10	8	6	50	28	+22	29	
9	Vișina Nouă	24	8	9	7	35	27	+8	24	
10	Viitorul Domnești (R)	24	10	2	12	27	38	−11	23	Relegation to Liga IV
11	Alexandria (R)	24	4	6	14	26	43	−17	18	Relegation to Liga IV
12	Concordia Chiajna II (R)	24	2	6	16	18	57	−39	12	Relegation to Liga IV
13	Tunari (R)	24	5	5	14	31	55	−24	11	Relegation to Liga IV

Source: FRF (in Romanian)
Rules for classification: 1st points; 2nd head-to-head points; 3rd head-to-head goal difference; 4th head-to-head goals scored; 5th head-to-head away goals scored; 6th goal difference; 7th number of goals scored
(C) Champions; (P) Promoted; (R) Relegated

=== Seria IV ===
Pos	Team	Pld	W	D	L	GF	GA	GD	Pts	Promotion or relegation
1	Minerul Motru (C, P)	22	12	8	2	36	20	+16	44	Promotion to Liga II
2	Jiul Rovinari	22	11	6	5	26	22	+4	39	
3	FCM Reșița	22	9	8	5	31	22	+9	35 (Note: MIL 3-2 RES; RES 2–0 MIL)	
4	Millenium Giarmata	22	9	8	5	35	25	+10	35	
5	Minerul Mătăsari	22	8	7	7	25	20	+5	31 (Note: MĂT 1-1 PAN; PAN 2–3 MĂT)	
6	Pandurii Târgu Jiu II	22	9	4	9	31	21	+10	31	
7	Muncitorul Reșița	22	6	10	6	27	31	−4	28	
8	Autocatania Caransebeș	22	6	6	10	27	41	−14	24 (Note: VUL 2-4 AUT; AUT 1–2 VUL)	
9	Vulturii Lugoj	22	6	6	10	28	33	−5	24	
10	Flacăra Făget (Note: Flacăra Făget was penalised 4 points by the FRF discipline committee.) (R)	22	7	6	9	17	24	−7	23	Relegation to Liga IV
11	Apă Craiova (R)	22	5	6	11	14	25	−11	21	Relegation to Liga IV
12	Vladimirescu (Note: Vladimirescu was penalised 2 points by the FRF discipline committee.) (R)	22	2	9	11	12	25	−13	13	Relegation to Liga IV

Source: FRF (in Romanian)
Rules for classification: 1st points; 2nd head-to-head points; 3rd head-to-head goal difference; 4th head-to-head goals scored; 5th head-to-head away goals scored; 6th goal difference; 7th number of goals scored
(C) Champions; (P) Promoted; (R) Relegated

=== Seria V ===
Pos	Team	Pld	W	D	L	GF	GA	GD	Pts	Promotion or relegation
1	Olimpia Satu Mare (C, P)	24	19	1	4	44	15	+29	58	Promotion to Liga II
2	Hunedoara	24	16	5	3	50	15	+35	53	
3	Oșorhei	24	16	4	4	45	23	+22	52	
4	Șoimii Pâncota	24	13	6	5	44	24	+20	45	
5	Unirea Dej	24	12	6	6	40	23	+17	42	
6	Zalău	24	10	3	11	57	37	+20	33 (Note: ZAL 4-2 SES; SES 1–1 ZAL)	
7	Seso Câmpia Turzii	24	9	6	9	33	27	+6	33	
8	Național Sebiș	24	9	4	11	36	38	−2	31 (Note: NAT: 8 pts, 9–5; SAN: 4 pts, 5–6; EUR: 4 pts, 2–5)	
9	Sănătatea Cluj (R)	24	9	4	11	37	37	0	31	Relegation to Liga IV
10	Europa Alba Iulia (R)	24	8	7	9	28	30	−2	31	Relegation to Liga IV
11	Plimob Sighetu Marmației (R)	24	4	0	20	18	69	−51	12	Relegation to Liga IV
12	Jiul Petroșani (Note: Jiul Petroșani withdrew from the championship during the winter half and lost all remaining matches with 0–3.) (R)	23	2	5	16	13	48	−35	11	Relegation to Liga IV
13	FCM Turda (Note: FCM Turda withdrew from the championship during the second half and lost all remaining matches with 0–3.) (R)	23	1	3	19	7	66	−59	6	Relegation to Liga IV

Source: FRF (in Romanian)
Rules for classification: 1st points; 2nd head-to-head points; 3rd head-to-head goal difference; 4th head-to-head goals scored; 5th head-to-head away goals scored; 6th goal difference; 7th number of goals scored
(C) Champions; (P) Promoted; (R) Relegated

=== Seria VI ===
Pos	Team	Pld	W	D	L	GF	GA	GD	Pts	Promotion or relegation
1	Unirea Tărlungeni (C, P)	18	14	3	1	26	5	+21	45	Promotion to Liga II
2	Fortuna Brazi	18	14	2	2	45	9	+36	44	
3	Unirea Câmpina	18	9	5	4	21	13	+8	32	
4	Argeșul Pitești	18	7	5	6	24	21	+3	26	
5	Zagon	18	6	7	5	22	24	−2	25 (Note: ZAG 3-1 CON; CON 0–0 ZAG)	
6	Conpet Ploiești	18	7	4	7	23	15	+8	25	
7	Avântul Reghin	18	4	6	8	21	29	−8	18	
8	FCM Târgoviște	18	4	5	9	15	23	−8	17	
9	Civitas Făgăraș (R)	18	4	1	13	17	39	−22	13	Relegation to Liga IV
10	Girom Albota (Note: Girom Albota withdrew from the championship during the winter half and lost all remaining matches with 3-0.) (R)	18	2	0	16	6	42	−36	6	Relegation to Liga IV

Source: FRF (in Romanian)
Rules for classification: 1st points; 2nd head-to-head points; 3rd head-to-head goal difference; 4th head-to-head goals scored; 5th head-to-head away goals scored; 6th goal difference; 7th number of goals scored
(C) Champions; (P) Promoted; (R) Relegated

== See also ==
- 2012–13 Liga I
- 2012–13 Liga II
- 2012–13 Liga IV
