= Dumitru Bolborea =

Romanian footballer and coach

Dumitru Bolborea (born 2 March 1958), is a former Romanian football player.

Dumitru played football between 1978 and 1993 for Rapid București, Automatica București, Național București, Inter Sibiu and Strungul Arad.

He became coach in 1994, coaching a youth squad of Național București from where he is promoted in 1995 as assistant coach of the first team. Between 1997 and 2000 he coached the Under 21 side of Național București but returned to his previous position as assistant coach in 2000 when he met Cosmin Olăroiu and since then the couple worked together for Național București (2000–2003 and 2003–2005), Steaua București (2003 and since 2005) and FCU Politehnica Timișoara (2005).
