= Stadionul Poiana =

Multi-use stadium in Câmpina, Romania

- Interactive map of Stadionul Poiana
- Address: Strada Gării, nr. 1
- Location: Poiana Câmpina, Romania
- Coordinates: 45°07′49.5″N 25°42′56.9″E
- Capacity: 4,000 seated
- Surface: Grass

Tenants
- FCM Câmpina (1936-2008); Fortuna Poiana Câmpina (2013–2015)

Poiana Stadium is a multi-use stadium in Poiana Câmpina. It is the home ground of FCM Câmpina. It holds over 4,000 people.

16 October 1993
15:00

Romania	2–2	Russia
Apostol 35'; Simion 68'	RFS Report (in Russian)	Savina 5', 17'

Stadionul Poiana, Câmpina
