= Constantin Nistor (footballer) =

Romanian footballer

Personal information
- Full name: Constantin Alin Nistor
- Date of birth: 9 November 1991 (age 34)
- Place of birth: Bucharest, Romania
- Height: 1.87 m (6 ft 2 in)
- Position: Striker

Senior career*
Years	Team	Apps	(Gls)
2008–2011	Snagov	42	(7)
2011–2013	Sportul Studenţesc	14	(1)
2013–2015	Berceni	41	(7)
2015–2016	Dinamo II București		

International career^{‡}
2012	Romania U-21	1	(0)
- * Club domestic league appearances and goals as of 2 November 2016 ‡ National team caps and goals as of 5 June 2012

Constantin Alin Nistor (born 9 November 1991, București) is a Romanian professional football player.
