= Stadionul Comunal (Afumați) =

Multi-use stadium in Afumați, Romania

- Interactive map of Stadionul Comunal
- Address: Șoseaua Petrăchioaia, nr. 82
- Location: Afumați, Romania
- Coordinates: 44°31′59″N 26°15′35.5″E
- Owner: Commune of Afumați
- Operator: CS Afumați
- Capacity: 3,000
- Surface: Grass

Construction
- Opened: 2000

Tenant
- CS Afumați (2003–present)

Stadionul Comunal is a multi-use stadium in Afumați, Romania. It is currently used mostly for football matches and is the home ground of CS Afumați. The stadium holds 3,000 people.
