= CS Axintele =

Romanian football club

- Full name: Club Sportiv Axintele
- Nicknames: Lupii galbeni (The Yellow Wolves); Alb-verzii (The White and Greens)
- Short name: Axintele
- Founded: 2002; 24 years ago
- Ground: Comunal
- Capacity: 1,000
- Owner: Axintele Commune
- Chairman: Marin Ioniță
- Manager: Marin Dumitrache
- League: Liga IV
- 2024–25: Liga IV, Ialomița, 14th of 18
Home colours	Away colours

Club Sportiv Axintele, commonly known as Axintele, is a Romanian football club based in Axintele, Ialomița County currently playing in the Liga IV – Ialomița County, the fourth tier of the Romanian football league system. The club was founded in 2002 under the name of Viitorul Axintele and played for several years in the third tier.

== History ==
The club was founded in 2002 under the name Viitorul Axintele and played in the Ialomița County Championships. Viitorul finished 5th out of 16 in the 2009–10 season of Liga IV – Ialomița County and won the County phase of the Cupa României, defeating Recolta Gheorghe Lazăr 3–1.

Viitorul Axintele promoted to Liga III for the first time in its history at the end of the 2010–11 season. The White and Greens won Liga IV – Ialomița County and the promotion play-off against the winner of Liga IV – Buzău County, Luceafărul C.A. Rosetti, 2–0 (Zaharia '46 and Cană '61) on neutral ground at Ștefan Vrăbioru Stadium in Ianca. The team led by Ion Nica was composed of Sava – Păun, Dumitru, Grecea (56' Pascale), Nichita, Dănilă – Toader (50' Cană), Borcea, Zaharia, Nicolae, and Velu.

Viitorul Axintele former logo

In its first season in Liga III, Viitorul secured a respectable 5th-place finish but was eliminated in the first round of Cupa României, losing 0–1 to Viitorul Chirnogi. The squad led by Ion Nica comprised Răduță, Donose, Sava, Stoica, Vasile, Pintilie, Ilie, Simion, Oprișan, Mihociu, Ionel, Rață, Șelaru, Florea, Căpălău, Moses, Robu, Dedu, Bogorodiță, Fătu, Novac, Chiriță, and Ștefan.

The 2012–13 season saw the team, coached by Ion Nica, fighting for promotion to Liga II. Viitorul finished 9 points ahead of the main contender, Gloria Buzău. However, a Romanian Football Federation inquiry proved that Viitorul did not have three youth teams in the county-level competition, as required by Liga III regulations, and imposed a 9-point penalty, which resulted in Gloria Buzău finishing first.

The White and Greens reached the play-off and finished as runners-up in the 2013–14 season. They also qualified for the fourth round of Cupa României, but lost 1–3 to Farul Constanța.

Viitorul Axintele, with Cristian Sava as technical director and Ion Nica as head coach, started the 2014–15 season aiming for promotion to the second tier. After a strong start, 5th place after seven rounds and a run to the Round of 32 in Cupa României, where they lost 0–2 to CFR Cluj with the lineup Răduță, Pavelescu (Cioceanu 70), Oprișan, Matei, Sava, Frangu (Ilie 62), Cană, Enciu (Badea 83), Croitoru, Luca, Ciochină, Cristian Sava left to join Gheorghe Hagi’s staff at Viitorul Constanța. He was replaced by Costel Pană, with Ion Nica as assistant, but Pană was dismissed at the end of the first half of the season and Octavian Grigore was appointed head coach in March after two rounds of the second half of the season. With three rounds remaining, the club withdrew, forfeited the remaining matches 0–3, placed 11th, and was relegated to the fourth tier.

Viitorul Axintele spent the following years in Liga IV – Ialomița County, generally occupying mid-table positions: 5th in 2015–16, 10th in 2016–17, 3rd in 2017–18, 7th in 2018–19 and 6th in 2019–20, the latter campaign being halted in March 2020 due to the COVID-19 pandemic. The club did not participate in the 2020–21 season, as the medical protocols imposed by the FRF generated costs that were considered too high.

In the 2021–22 season, the White and Greens finished 10th. They managed to bounce back the following year, ending the 2022–23 campaign in 8th place in the West Series of Liga IV – Ialomița County and 12th overall after the play-out. During the 2023–24 season, the club was renamed CS Axintele, finishing 5th in the West Series and 10th overall after the play-out stage. In the 2024–25 season, however, the team dropped to 14th place in the single series, resulting in relegation to the second county tier, the fifth level of Romanian football.

== Honours ==
Liga III

- Runners-up (2): 2012–13, 2013–14

Liga IV – Ialomița County

- Winners (1): 2010–11

Cupa României – Ialomița County

- Winners (2): 2009–10, 2017–18

== Club officials ==
=== Board of directors ===
Role	Name
Owner	(Romania) Axintele Commune
President	(Romania) Marin Ioniță
Youth Center Manager	(Romania) Nicolae Cristea

=== Current technical staff ===
Role	Name
Manager	(Romania) Marin Dumitrache

== Former managers ==
- (Romania) Ion Nica (2009–2014)
- (Romania) Costel Pană (2014)
- (Romania) Octavian Grigore (2015)
- (Romania) Valentin Negru (2015)
