= CSL Ștefănești =

Romanian football club

- Full name: Club Sportiv Local Ștefănești
- Nicknames: Ștefăneștii (The people from Ștefănești); Ilfovenii (The people from Ilfov)
- Short name: Ștefănești
- Founded: 1997; 29 years ago 2019; 7 years ago (refounded)
- Ground: Dumitru Mătărău
- Capacity: 1,150
- Owner: Ștefăneștii de Jos Commune
- Chairman: George Daniel Bozieru
- Manager: Laurenţiu Tudor
- League: Liga II
- 2025–26: Liga III, Series I Regular season: 1st of 12; Play-off, Series I: 2nd (promoted)
- Website: clubstefanesti.ro
Home colours	Away colours

Club Sportiv Local Ștefăneștii de Jos, also known as CSL Ștefănești, or simply as Ștefănești is a Romanian football club based in Ștefăneștii de Jos, Ilfov County, which currently plays in Liga II, the second tier of Romanian football.

== History ==
Football in Ștefăneștii de Jos dates back to the 1950s, with the club competing mainly in amateur regional and Ilfov County championships before its current form as CS Ștefănești in 1997. From 2002, the club competed as SC Mobexpert Ștefănești due to a sponsorship agreement with a furniture manufacturer, winning the 2003–04 Divizia D Ilfov County title but declining promotion to Divizia C for financial reasons. Later, following a partnership with metal systems manufacturer Lindab, the club was renamed FC Lindab Ștefănești.

A significant moment in the club’s history came at the end of the 2010–11 season. The team coached by Florin Vlădilă won the Liga IV Ilfov County and secured promotion in Liga III by defeating Viață Nouă Olteni, the winner of Liga IV Teleorman County, 3–1 in the promotion play-off at the Marin Anastasovici Stadium in Giurgiu. The squad was composed of Vladu, Marinescu, Rababoc, Mihalache, Stancu, Al. Ion, Ad. Cristea, Mega, Ganea, Drăgan, Romanescu (cpt.), Șerban, M. Dumitrache, D. Dumitrache, M. Gheorghe, Șerbănescu, Ioniță, and Pădureț.

The first season in the third division for Ștefănești took place under a succession of managers. First, Costel Pană was appointed as the new head coach in August, but Pană left the club after four rounds and was replaced by Dragoș Mihalache, who was in charge until January 2012 when he was in turn replaced by Iulian Mihăescu, who was dismissed after four matches and, after the interim offered by the couple Cristian Mătărău - Daniel Dumitrache, Adrian Peiu was appointed as head coach for the rest of the season leading the club to 4th-place finish.

In the following season, Ilfovenii appointed Romulus Ciobanu as head coach, but relatively modest performances led to a premature separation in October. He was replaced by Emil Ursu, who led the team to a 5th-place finish with 32 points, after being penalised 9 points by the Romanian Football Federation for not registering the required three youth squads.

In the 2013–14 season, Ștefănești was in 2nd place after the regular season, but they dropped to 3rd place in the play-offs, as in the following season the club finished 4th with Marin Dună as head coach.

In the summer of 2015, the club encountered some financial problems, being almost dissolved, but eventually managed to overcome them and with Laurențiu Tudor as head coach, finished the 2015–16 season in 9th place.

However, the club was dissolved in the summer of 2016, and all of their players and staff were taken by Unirea Tărlungeni, who were dissolved in 2017.

The club was refounded in 2019 under the name CSL Ștefăneștii de Jos. Initially focused on youth development, the senior team was admitted into Liga IV Ilfov County ahead of the 2021–22 season. Under player-coach Mădălin Gheorghe, Ștefănești finished 1st in Series II, but, having been admitted on demand, the club was not eligible to participate in the county championship play-off for promotion.

Laurențiu Tudor returned as head coach in 2022, leading Ștefănești to win Series II and qualify for the championship play-off in the 2022–23 season, where they eliminated Brănești in the semi-final before losing the final against Clinceni.

At the end of the 2023–24 season, Ștefănești won the Liga IV Ilfov County title, but lost the promotion play-off against ACS FC Dinamo București 5–6 on aggregate. Following the withdrawal of several clubs from Liga III, the Romanian Football Federation invited CSL Ștefănești to join the third tier.

The 2024–25 season marked the club’s return to Liga III, with Valentin Ivan appointed head coach. Ștefănești finished 3rd in Series V, both at the end of the regular season and in the play-out phase, before unexpectedly parting ways with Ivan at the end of the campaign.

Ahead of the 2025–26 campaign, Claudiu Ionescu took charge for the first half of the season, with Laurențiu Tudor named as the new head coach in January 2026. Under his leadership, Ștefănești finished 2nd in Series IV and secured a historic promotion to Liga II, winning Series II of the play-off stage, tied on points with Popești-Leordeni, but finishing ahead on first-stage points.

== Honours ==
Liga III

- Winners (1): 2025–26

Liga IV – Ilfov County

- Winners (3): 2003–04, 2010–11, 2023–24

== Players ==
=== First team squad ===
As of 10 September 2024

Note: Flags indicate national team as defined under FIFA eligibility rules; some limited exceptions apply. Players may hold more than one non-FIFA nationality.

No.	Pos.	Nation	Player
1	GK	ROU	Matei Burlacu
4	DF	ROU	Ionuț Puțaru
5	DF	ROU	Liviu Nenciu (on loan from Rapid)
6	DF	ROU	Mihai Tudose
8	MF	ROU	Cosmin Chiru
9	FW	ROU	Mihai Terchila
10	MF	ROU	Ștefan Gheorghe
11	MF	ROU	Ștefan Stîngă (Captain)
12	GK	ROU	Andrei Sebe
13	MF	ROU	Robert Dumitru
14	MF	ROU	Mihai Sima
15	FW	ROU	Bogdan Savin
16	MF	ROU	Robert Buduroi
17	MF	ROU	Mădălin Gheorghe

No.	Pos.	Nation	Player
18	MF	ROU	Ștefan Ion
19	MF	ROU	Alexandru Zaharia
21	FW	ROU	Ionuț Tudorache
22	MF	ROU	Toma Vincene
23	MF	ROU	Bogdan Pitulac
25	DF	ROU	Darius Alexe
26	DF	ROU	Darius Mihai
27	MF	ROU	Sorin Nica
28	MF	ROU	Emil Bratu
32	MF	ROU	David Țicu
33	GK	ROU	Mihnea Pârvu
35	DF	ROU	Andrei Ioniță
45	DF	ROU	Luca Burlacu

=== Out on loan ===
Note: Flags indicate national team as defined under FIFA eligibility rules; some limited exceptions apply. Players may hold more than one non-FIFA nationality.

No. / Pos. / Nation / Player	No. / Pos. / Nation / Player

== Club officials ==
=== Board of directors ===
Role	Name
Owner	(Romania) Ștefăneștii de Jos Commune
President	(Romania) George Daniel Bozieru (ex.Ofiter Integritate)

=== Current technical staff ===
Role	Name
Manager	(Romania) Laurențiu Tudor
Assistant coach	Valentin Ivan

== Former managers ==
- (Romania) Florin Vlădilă (2010–2011)
- (Romania) Costel Pană (2011)
- (Romania) Dragoș Mihalache (2011)
- (Romania) Iulian Mihăescu (2012)
- (Romania) Cristian Mătărău - Daniel Dumitrache (2012)
- (Romania) Adrian Peiu (2012)
- (Romania) Romulus Ciobanu (2012)
- (Romania) Emil Ursu (2012–2013)
- (Romania) Laurențiu Tudor (2013–2014)
- (Romania) Marin Dună (2014–2015)
- (Romania) Laurențiu Tudor (2015–2016)

== League and cup history ==
Season	Tier	Division	Place	Notes	Cupa României
2026–27	2	Liga II	TBD		TBD
2025–26	3	Liga III	1st (C, P)	Promoted	
2024–25	3	Liga III (Seria V)	3rd		Second Round
2023–24	4	Liga IV (IF)	1st (C)	Promoted	Regional Phase
