= FCM Dorohoi =

- Full name: Fotbal Club Municipal Dorohoi
- Short name: FCM Dorohoi
- Founded: 2010
- Dissolved: 2015
- Ground: Municipal
- Capacity: 2,000
- 2015–16: Liga II, Seria I, 14th (relegated)

Fotbal Club Municipal Dorohoi, commonly known as FCM Dorohoi, was a Romanian professional football club from Dorohoi, Botoșani County, founded in 2010. Home matches were played at Stadionul Municipal, the same stadium which Cristalul, former Dorohoi football team, used to play.

== History ==
In spite they finishing 2nd in 2010–11 Liga IV Botoșani season, FCM Dorohoi qualifying for the Liga IV promotion play-off because the second team of FC Botoșani, the winner of the league, was disbanded at the end of the season. In play-off they played with the champions of Vaslui County, FCM Huși, and managed to win with 2–1 after extra time in a match that was played in Iași at the Tepro Stadium, promoting to Liga III.

They finished 8th in the 2011–12 Liga III and 2nd 2012–13 Liga III.

The club currently plays in the Liga II for the first time ever in the 2014–15 after they finished 1st in the 2013–14 Liga III.

After finishing on 7th place in their first Liga II season, the club was dissolved in the summer of 2015.

== Honours ==
Liga III

- Winners (1): 2013–14
- Runners-up (1): 2012–13

Liga IV – Botoșani County

- Runners-up (1): 2010–11
