= AFC Fortuna Poiana Câmpina =

Romanian football club

- Full name: Asociația Fotbal Club Fortuna Poiana Câmpina
- Founded: 2012 as Fortuna Brazi
- Dissolved: 2015
- Ground: Poiana
- Capacity: 4,000
- 2014–15: Liga II, Seria II, 11th (relegated)
Home colours	Away colours

Fortuna Poiana Câmpina was a Romanian football club from Poiana Câmpina, Prahova County, founded in 2010. The team was dissolved in the summer of 2015.

== History ==
It was founded in the summer of 2012 under the name of Fortuna Brazi after a merger between Prahova 2010 Tomșani and Chimia Brazi. On August 2, 2013, it was announced that the club was moved from Brazi to Poiana Câmpina and changed its name from Fortuna Brazi to Fortuna Poiana Câmpina.

At the end of the 2013–14 Liga III season, the team gained promotion to Liga II, for the first time in their history.

== Honours ==
Liga III:

- Winners (1): 2013–14
- Runners-up (1): 2012–13

== Notable former players ==
- (Romania) Csaba Borbély
- (Romania) Cristian Danci
- (Romania) Bogdan Șandru
- (Romania) Andrei Antohi

== Former managers ==
- (Romania) Octavian Grigore (2012–2013)
- (Romania) Laurențiu Diniță (2013)
- (Romania) Mugurel Cornățeanu (2013)
- (Romania) Edward Iordănescu (2013)
- (Romania) Eusebiu Tudor (2014)
