= FC Pojorâta =

Romanian football club

- Full name: Fotbal Club Pojorâta
- Nicknames: Bucovinenii (The People from Bucovina)
- Founded: 1950; 2017 (refounded)
- Dissolved: 2020
- Ground: Comunal
- Capacity: 1,000
- 2019–20: Liga IV, Suceava County, 4th
Home colours	Away colours

Fotbal Club Pojorâta, commonly known as FC Pojorâta, or simply as Pojorâta, was a Romanian football club based in Pojorâta, Suceava County founded in 1950 and dissolved in 2020.. Over time, the club had several names such as Foresta, Voința, Sportul Muncitoresc and Bucovina.

== History ==
Former logo, used until 2013.

Founded in 1950 as Foresta Pojorâta, the club played almost all its existence in the Suceava Regional, District and County Championships.

At the end of the 2012–13 season, the team finished first in Liga IV – Suceava County with 74 points, 17 points ahead of 2nd place and managed to promote for the first time in its history to Liga III, beating Viitorul Târgu Frumos, the Liga IV – Iași County winner, 2–1 after extra time, at Municipal Stadium in Dorohoi. The team led by Dan Mândrilă was composed amongst others by Nicolae Axinte, Petru Rotariu, Gioni Tivodar, Aurel Prundeanu, Vlad Nuțu, Michael Chelariu, Bogdan Botezatu, Ciprian Ioniță, Ion Nemeș, Andrei Irimia, Movileanu, Nicolae Lazăr, Rau, Ilie Cornel, Stroia, Alin Iftimie, Bogdan Jescu and Alexandru Ruxandar.

A rebranding operation came along with the promotion, the club changing its name to Bucovina Pojorâta, a tribute to the area where the team originates, Bukovina.

Bucovina promoted to Liga II, for the first time in its history, at the end of the 2014–15 season, The team coached by Dan Mândrilă and composed amongst other players from Puianu, Cristescu, Aurel Prundeanu, Patca, Duțică, Gioni Tivodar, Vârlan, Răzlog, Stănescu, Bolbos, Rus, Colța, Pădurariu, Iuga and Buhăceanu won the Series I of Liga III.

In the summer of 2016, after the relegation from Liga II, the club was dissolved. Then in the summer of 2017, after one year of inactivity, the club was refounded and enrolled in Liga IV – Suceava County.

== Honours ==
Liga III

- Winners (1): 2014–15

Liga IV – Suceava County

- Winners (1): 2012–13
- Runners-up (1): 2018–19

Liga V – Suceava County

- Winners (1): 2008–09
