= CS Afumați =

Romanian football club

- Full name: Club Sportiv Afumați
- Nicknames: Afumățenii (The People from Afumați); Galben-Albaștrii (The Yellow and Blues)
- Founded: 1996; 30 years ago as Juventus Afumați
- Ground: Comunal
- Capacity: 3,000
- Owner: Afumați Commune
- Chairman: Gabriel Dumănică
- Head coach: Vasile Neagu
- League: Liga II
- 2025–26: Liga II, 14th of 22
- Website: http://www.fcafumati.ro/
Home colours	Away colours	Third colours

Club Sportiv Afumați, commonly known as CS Afumați or simply as Afumați, is a Romanian football club based in Afumați, Ilfov County, currently playing in the Liga II.

== History ==
CS Afumați was founded in 1996 and played in Liga IV until the summer of 2011 when the club obtained a place in Liga III despite the fact that it failed to promote.

Name	Period
Juventus Afumați	1996–2000
Spicul Afumați	2000–2003
CS Afumați	2003–

In Liga III the team from Afumați has become known as a heavy-handed team finishing always in top 5, 3rd place in the first season, 5th place in the second one, then again on the 3rd place and missed promotion in front of Chindia Târgovişte at the end of 2014–15 Liga III season.

Team's constancy came to fruition in the 2015–16 season when they managed to promote to Liga II even in the last round after a dramatic match against CS Ştefăneşti.

In the first season of Liga II the yellow and blues finished on 8th place out of 20 and were eliminated in the round of 16 in the Romanian Cup. The second season was a better one for the team from Ilfov County which finished on the 5th place, but at the end of the championship, due to financial reasons, "the Yellow and Blues" withdrew from Liga II and enrolled in the Liga III.

== Honours ==
Liga III

- Winners (5): 2015–16, 2020–21, 2021–22, 2022–23, 2023–24
- Runners-up (3): 2011–12, 2014–15, 2018–19

Divizia D / Liga IV – Ilfov County

- Winners (2): 1999–2000, 2009–10
- Runners-up (1): 2010–11

== Players ==
=== First-team squad ===
As of 19 October 2026

Note: Flags indicate national team as defined under FIFA eligibility rules; some limited exceptions apply. Players may hold more than one non-FIFA nationality.

No.	Pos.	Nation	Player
1	GK	ROU	David Dumitrescu
2	DF	ROU	Alexandru Păun
3	DF	ROU	Alin Lazăr
4	DF	CIV	Mohamed Diomandé
6	DF	ROU	Costas Sersescu
7	MF	ROU	Alexandru Enache
8	MF	ROU	Marcos Sacară
9	FW	CIV	Mamourou Sanogo
10	MF	ROU	Ionuț Zaina (Captain)
11	MF	ROU	Gabriel Mihoreanu
12	GK	ROU	Alberto Cimpoeșu

No.	Pos.	Nation	Player
14	MF	ROU	Vlad Marica
15	MF	ROU	Laurențiu Liș
16	DF	FRA	Onur Kaplan
17	DF	ROU	Constantin Robicek (Vice-captain)
20	MF	ROU	Vlad Ghineț (3rd captain)
21	DF	ROU	Valerio Gallo
24	FW	ROU	Darius Stancu
25	MF	ROU	Alin Raicu
26	MF	GHA	Charles McCarthy
30	GK	ROU	Patrick Strizu

=== Out of loan ===
Note: Flags indicate national team as defined under FIFA eligibility rules; some limited exceptions apply. Players may hold more than one non-FIFA nationality.

No.	Pos.	Nation	Player
—	MF	ROU	Cosmin Atanase (to CSM Alexandria until 30 June 2027)

== Club officials ==
=== Board of directors ===
Role	Name
Owner	(Romania) Afumați Commune
President	(Romania) Gabriel Dumănică
Vice-president	(Romania) Ștefan Nica
Sporting director	(Romania) Daniel Neagu
Delegate	(Romania) Vasile Niță

=== Current technical staff ===
Role	Name
Head coach	(Romania) Vasile Neagu
Assistant coaches	(Romania) Cristian Vaida (Romania) Sergiu Bar
Goalkeeping coach	(Romania) Marian Petre
Fitness coach	(Romania) Alexandru Bombaru
Club doctor	(Romania) Ovidiu Chiriac

== Notable former players ==
The footballers enlisted below have had international cap(s) for their respective countries at junior and/or senior level and/or significant caps for Afumați.

Romania

- (Romania) Sabin Alexe
- (Romania) Răzvan Avram
- (Romania) Cristian Balgiu
- (Romania) Sergiu Bar
- (Romania) Cezar Beșleagă
- (Romania) Robert Buduroi
- (Romania) Nicolae Buzea
- (Romania) Alexandru Ciucur
- (Romania) Cătălin Cocoș
- (Romania) Valentin Costache
- (Romania) Mugurel Dedu
- (Romania) Florin Geană
- (Romania) Alexandru Gheorghe
- (Romania) Valentin Gheorghe
- (Romania) Alexandru Iamandache
- (Romania) Alexandru Mitu
- (Romania) Mihai Obretin
- (Romania) Vasile Olariu
- (Romania) Răzvan Onea
- (Romania) Răzvan Patriche
- (Romania) Ciprian Perju
- (Romania) Ionuț Petculescu
- (Romania) Adrian Popa
- (Romania) Ciprian Stanciu
- (Romania) Ștefan Stângă
- (Romania) Vlad Tudorache
- (Romania) Bobi Verdeș
- (Romania) Marian Vlada
- (Romania) Alin Zaharia

Cape Verde

- (Cape Verde) Ely

Nigeria

- (Nigeria) Kehinde Fatai

== League history ==
Season	Tier	Division	Place	Cupa României
2026–27	2	Liga II	TBD	Play-off round
2025–26	2	Liga II	14th	Play-off round
2024–25	2	Liga II	14th	Group stage
2023–24	3	Liga III (Seria III)	1st (C, P)	
2022–23	3	Liga III (Seria III)	1st (C)	
2021–22	3	Liga III (Seria III)	1st (C)	
2020–21	3	Liga III (Seria III)	1st (C)	
2019–20	3	Liga III (Seria II)	3rd	
2018–19	3	Liga III (Seria II)	2nd	
2017–18	2	Liga II	5th (R)	Round of 16
2016–17	2	Liga II	8th	Round of 16
2015–16	3	Liga III (Seria III)	1st (C, P)	
2014–15	3	Liga III (Seria III)	2nd	
2013–14	3	Liga III (Seria II)	4th	
2012–13	3	Liga III (Seria III)	8th	
2011–12	3	Liga III (Seria II)	2nd	
