= CSM Caransebeș =

- Full name: Club Sportiv Municipal Caransebeș
- Nicknames: Gugulanii; Alb-albaștrii (The White and Blues)
- Short name: CSM
- Founded: 2006; 20 years ago as Scorilo Caransebeș; 2016; 10 years ago as Viitorul Caransebeș; 2024; 2 years ago as CSM Caransebeș
- Ground: Municipal / Balta Sărată
- Capacity: 4,000 / 500
- Owner: Caransebeș Municipality
- Chairman: Gheorghe Vălușescu
- Manager: Gheorghe Manu
- League: Liga IV
- 2025–26: Liga IV, Caraș-Severin, 2nd of 14
Home colours	Away colours

Club Sportiv Municipal Caransebeș, commonly known as CSM Caransebeș, or simply as Caransebeș is a Romanian professional football club based in Caransebeș, Caraș-Severin County, It was founded in 2006 as Scorilo Caransebeș and played at its best at the level of the second division, under the name of FC Caransebeș. The club was dissolved in 2015, the re-established in 2016 as Viitorul Caransebeș, then was again declared bankrupt in 2019, just to be re-founded in 2024 as CSM Caransebeș.

== History ==
=== Early years of football in Caransebeș ===
The first football game played in Caransebeș was in 1913 between the sports club of the Romanian students who were studying in Budapest and young members of the Hungarian athletic club in Caransebeș. The score was 6–1 for the Romanian students who were studying in Budapest.

Between 1913 and 1944 were played only friendly matches between local teams or against teams from the region. In 1944 appeared the first professional football club, CFR Caransebeș. The team was a meteoric presence in Divizia C until the mid-60's when it started to become a regular member of this level, but with no important results. In the same period another club appeared, Victoria Caransebeș, a club with also a regular presence at Divizia C in that period, period in which the town of Caransebeș had two teams at this level. In 1972 both teams relegated, but CFR promoted back one year later and played in the third league, this time until 1976 when the club relegated again.

From 1976 a new club started to have good results in the Caraș-Severin County Championship, CPL Caransebeș. From 1976 to 1979 was an important battle for the supremacy at county level and city level between CFR and CPL. CFR won in 77' and 78' but could not win the promotion play-offs, but in 79' CPL won Divizia D and also the promotion play-off, with a 5–1 on aggregate against Gorj County champion, Petrolul Țicleni. CFR promoted also next year and 1980–81 Divizia C season found again at its start two teams from Caransebeș, this time CPL and CFR. CFR finished in 10th place, but CPL relegated after finishing only in 15th place, out of 16.

=== CFR VS CSM ===
In 1981 CFR Caransebeș merged with its old rival Victoria and formed CFR Victoria Caransebeș, name under which it evolved until 1987 when it returns to its old name, CFR Caransebeș. In this time, a league down, two teams could not match with CFR's dominance and in 1983 ICM (Întreprinderea de Construcţii Metalice) Caransebeș, the football team of the Metal Construction Company, a team with good results at this level and CPL (Combinatul de Prelucrare a Lemnului), the football team of the Wood Processing Unit and also the old rival from the late 70's of CFR merged and formed a new team CSM (Workers Sports Club) Caransebeș. CSM promoted at the end of its first season in this new formula after a play-off match against CFR Simeria, won 3–2 on aggregate.

After the promotion of CSM the town of Caransebeș had again two team in Divizia C and also an interesting rivalry. CSM won the first season finishing on 2nd place while CFR only on 14th place. In 1986 both teams finished with 39 points, but again CSM ended up, on 11th place and CFR on 12th. In 87' CFR won its first duel finishing on 8th, with one point and place over CSM, then in 1988 CSM finished again 2nd, five places over CFR. In 1989 CSM finished on 13th and CFR relegated to Divizia D.

CSM continued at this level with good results 6th–1990, 5th–1991, 2nd–1992.

In the summer of 1992 the club changed its name from CSM Caransebeș to Caromet Caransebeș, the new name of the Metal Construction Company after the fall of communism, finishing only on 17th place at the end of the 1992–93 season and relegated to Divizia D.

From 1993 another club appeared on Caransebeș football scene, with important results at county level, Vega Caransebeș, team which promoted to Divizia C in 1994, but shortly after this performance the club is moved from Caransebeș to Deva and merged with the local team, Mureșul, evolving in the years to come under the name of Vega Deva or Mureșul Deva.

Until 1997 the football teams from Caransebeș battled in the 4th league anonymity, then in 1997 the oldest club of the town, CFR promoted again to Divizia C, after 8 years of absence, but relegated at the end of the 1997–98 season. Then in 1999 Caromet (old CSM) promoted back, but after two very poor seasons relegated also to Divizia D. After 3 years of Divizia D Caromet promoted back in 2003, but finished on the last place in its series and relegated back at the end of 2003–04 Divizia C season. CFR and Caromet disappeared during this troubled period of the early and mid-2000s leaving the football from Caransebeș without any horizons.

=== From agony to historical performance and agony again ===
Former logo, as FC Caransebeș.

In 2006 a new team was founded, FC Scorilo Caransebeș, that played at the 4th league level, being helped financially by Dan Alexa, former football player of Politehnica Timișoara and Dinamo București among other clubs.

In 2010 was founded Autocatania Caransebeș, the team was enrolled in Liga III and finished its first season on 4th place. In the next two seasons the performances have fallen, Catania finishing on 7th and 11 place. Then in 2013 Scorilo and Autocatania, now the main teams of the city merged and formed FC Caransebeș. The new club promoted at the end of the season to Liga II, being the first club from Caransebeș that has ever reached this level.

In its first season at this level, FC Caransebeș played honorably and finished on 8th place the regular season, then being second in the play-out tournament and saved from relegation. In the summer of 2015 Giovanni Pisano was named the coach of the team, bringing with him some Italian players and also some strange results.

In December 2015, Caransebeș Municipality refused to finance the team forwards after a penalty of 52 points dictated by the Romanian Football Federation as a result of the club's debts. The team was also suspected of fixing matches, in the first part of the 2015–16 Liga II season. As a result of the decision of Caransebeş Municipality, one of the club's owners, the team was retired from the championship and dissolved.

Former logo, as Viitorul Caransebeș.

Immediately after the team's withdrawal from the second league, the idea of re-establishing the club arose and in the summer of 2016 the club was re-founded as Viitorul Caransebeș and was enrolled in Liga IV – Caraș-Severin County. Gugulanii won Liga IV – Caraș-Severin County and played a promotion play-off against Alba County champion, Șurianu Sebeș, but lost 2–5 (1–2, 1–3) on aggregate and remained for another season in the fourth league of the Romanian football.

Viitorul was a short story and in the end the club was dissolved once again in 2019, due to lack of funds, but re-established in the summer of 2024 as CSM Caransebeș.

== Grounds ==
The club plays its home matches on Stadionul Municipal from Caransebeș, with a capacity of 4,000 seats or on Balta Sărată Stadium, with a capacity of 500 people. Balta Sărata was also used as the main stadium of the team between 2006 and 2014, but after the promotion to Liga II Municipal Stadium was renovated and the team moved for its official matches there.

== Rivalries ==
The most important rivalry for CSM Caransebeș is the one against CSM Reșița. A rivalry also exist with Sportul Snagov, but when this team was named Metalul Reșița and played his home matches at Reșița, being the main team of the city.

== Honours ==
Liga III

- Winners (1): 2013–14

Liga IV – Caraș-Severin County

- Winners (2): 2009–10, 2016–17
- Runners-up (3): 2017–18, 2018–19, 2025–26

== Former managers ==
- (Romania) Romulus Ciobanu (2010–2011)
- (Romania) Ion Ibric (2011–2012)
- (Romania) Alin Artimon (2013–2015)
- (Italy) Giovanni Pisano (2015)
