= Andrei Cerlincă =

Romanian footballer

Personal information
- Full name: Andrei Ionuț Cerlincă
- Date of birth: 6 August 1995 (age 31)
- Place of birth: Suceava, Romania
- Height: 1.78 m (5 ft 10 in)
- Position: Midfielder

Team information
- Current team: Cetatea Suceava
- Number: 7

Youth career
- –2010: LPS Suceava

Senior career*
Years	Team	Apps	(Gls)
2010–2012	Sporting Suceava		
2012–2015	Rapid CFR Suceava	44	(2)
2015	Rapid București	10	(0)
2016	FC Brașov	1	(0)
2016–2018	Foresta Suceava	54	(9)
2018–2019	Bucovina Rădăuți	25	(11)
2019–2021	Foresta Suceava	27	(12)
2021–2024	Juniorul Suceava		
2024–	Cetatea Suceava	21	(7)

International career
2014	Romania U19	3	(0)
2015	Romania U21	2	(0)
- * Club domestic league appearances and goals as of 31 October 2026

Andrei Ionuț Cerlincă (born 6 August 1995) is a Romanian footballer who plays as a midfielder for Liga II club Cetatea Suceava, which he captains.

== Honours ==
Sporting Suceava

- Liga IV – Suceava County: 2010–11

Juniorul Suceava

- Liga IV – Suceava County: 2021–22

Cetatea Suceava

- Liga III: 2025–26
- Liga IV – Suceava County: 2024–25
