= 1954 Regional Championship =

13th season of the Liga IV, the fourth tier of the Romanian football league

Liga IV
- Season: 1954

The 1954 Regional Championship was the 13th season of the Regional Championship, 4th as the third tier of Romanian football. The champions of each regional championships play against each other in the playoffs to earn promotion to Divizia B.

== Regional championships ==
- Arad (AR)
- Bacău (BC)
- Baia Mare (BM)
- Bârlad (BD)
- Bucharest Municipality (B)
- Bucharest Region (B)
- Cluj (CJ)
- Constanța (CT)
- Craiova (CR)
- Galați (GL)
- Hunedoara (HD)
- Iași (IS)
- Mureș (MS)
- Oradea (OR)
- Pitești (PI)
- Ploiești (PL)
- Stalin (ST)
- Suceava (SV)
- Timișoara (TM)

== Promotion play-off ==
Nineteen teams participate in the promotion tournament. The teams were divided into two groups of six and one of seven, and the first two ranked teams from each group promoted to second division. The matches was played on neutral grounds at Ploiești, Arad and Sibiu.

=== Series I (Ploiești) ===
Table

Pos	Team	Pld	W	D	L	GF	GA	GD	Pts	Qualification
1	Avântul Fălticeni (SV) (P)	5	4	0	1	11	6	+5	8	Promotion to Divizia B
2	Locomotiva Galați (GL) (P)	5	3	2	0	8	5	+3	8	Promotion to Divizia B
3	Flamura Roșie Constanța (CT)	5	1	2	2	7	7	0	4	
4	Flacăra Moinești (BC)	5	1	2	2	6	7	−1	4	
5	Dinamo Tecuci (BD)	5	1	2	2	8	11	−3	4	
6	Flamura Roșie Iași (IS)	5	1	0	4	6	10	−4	2	

Rules for classification: 1) points; 2) goal difference; 3) number of goals scored.
(P) Promoted

Results

31 October 1954	Avântul Fălticeni	2–1	Flamura Roșie Constanța	Ploiești

31 October 1954	Flacăra Moinești	0–1	Locomotiva Galați	Ploiești

31 October 1954	Flamura Roșie Iași	4–3	Dinamo Tecuci	Ploiești

4 November 1954	Avântul Fălticeni	2–3	Locomotiva Galați	Ploiești

4 November 1954	Flamura Roșie Constanța	1–2	Dinamo Tecuci	Ploiești

4 November 1954	Flacăra Moinești	2–1	Flamura Roșie Iași	Ploiești

7 November 1954	Dinamo Tecuci	0–3	Avântul Fălticeni	Ploiești

7 November 1954	Locomotiva Galați	1–0	Flamura Roșie Iași	Ploiești

7 November 1954	Flamura Roșie Constanța	1–1	Flacăra Moinești	Ploiești

11 November 1954	Flamura Roșie Iași	1–2	Avântul Fălticeni	Ploiești

11 November 1954	Dinamo Tecuci	2–2	Flacăra Moinești	Ploiești

11 November 1954	Locomotiva Galați	2–2	Flamura Roșie Constanța	Ploiești

14 November 1954	Avântul Fălticeni	2–1	Flacăra Moinești	Ploiești

14 November 1954	Flamura Roșie Iași	0–2	Flamura Roșie Constanța	Ploiești

14 November 1954	Dinamo Tecuci	1–1	Locomotiva Galați	Ploiești

=== Series II (Arad) ===
Table

Pos	Team	Pld	W	D	L	GF	GA	GD	Pts	Qualification
1	Știința Craiova (CR) (P)	5	3	1	1	7	3	+4	7	Promotion to Divizia B
2	Metalul 108 Cugir (HD) (P)	5	3	1	1	9	6	+3	7	Promotion to Divizia B
3	Flacăra București (B)	5	1	4	0	7	5	+2	6	
4	Metalul Oțelul Roșu (TM)	5	1	2	2	7	9	−2	4	
5	Metalul 113 Plopeni (PL)	5	0	3	2	6	8	−2	3	
6	Flamura Roșie Râmnicu Vâlcea (PI)	5	1	1	3	8	13	−5	3	

Rules for classification: 1) points; 2) goal difference; 3) number of goals scored.
(P) Promoted

Results

31 October 1954	Flacăra București	2–2	Flamura Roșie Râmnicu Vâlcea	Arad

31 October 1954	Metalul 113 Plopeni	1–1	Metalul Oțelul Roșu	Arad

31 October 1954	Știința Craiova	1–2	Metalul 108 Cugir	Arad

4 November 1954	Flacăra București	1–1	Metalul 113 Plopeni	Arad

4 November 1954	Flamura Roșie Râmnicu Vâlcea	0–2	Știința Craiova	Arad

4 November 1954	Metalul Oțelul Roșu	1–2	Metalul 108 Cugir	Arad

7 November 1954	Metalul Oțelul Roșu	3–2	Flamura Roșie Râmnicu Vâlcea	Arad

8 November 1954	Știința Craiova	0–0	Flacăra București	Arad

8 November 1954	Metalul 108 Cugir	1–1	Metalul 113 Plopeni	Arad

11 November 1954	Flacăra București	2–2	Metalul Oțelul Roșu	Arad

11 November 1954	Metalul 113 Plopeni	1–2	Știința Craiova	Arad

11 November 1954	Metalul 108 Cugir	4–1	Flamura Roșie Râmnicu Vâlcea	Arad

14 November 1954	Știința Craiova	2–0	Metalul Oțelul Roșu	Arad

14 November 1954	Metalul 108 Cugir	0–2	Flacăra București	Arad

14 November 1954	Metalul 113 Plopeni	2–3	Flamura Roșie Râmnicu Vâlcea	Arad

=== Series III (Sibiu) ===
Table

Pos	Team	Pld	W	D	L	GF	GA	GD	Pts	Qualification
1	Metalul AMEFA Arad (AR) (P)	6	3	3	0	8	2	+6	9	Promotion to Divizia B
2	Știința București (B) (P)	6	3	1	2	7	6	+1	7	Promotion to Divizia B
3	Metalul 131 Tohan (ST)	6	3	1	2	7	6	+1	7	
4	Progresul Bistrița (CJ)	6	2	2	2	4	4	0	6	
5	Flamura Roșie Salonta (OR)	6	2	1	3	8	9	−1	5	
6	Metalul Satu Mare (BM)	6	1	1	4	5	8	−3	3	
7	Dinamo Târgu Mureș (MS)	6	1	3	2	4	8	−4	5	

Rules for classification: 1) points; 2) goal difference; 3) number of goals scored.
(P) Promoted

Results

31 October 1954	Metalul AMEFA Arad	0–0	Progresul Bistrița	Sibiu

31 October 1954	Metalul 131 Tohan	2–1	Flamura Roșie Salonta	Sibiu

31 October 1954	Metalul Satu Mare	2–0	Dinamo Târgu Mureș	Sibiu

4 November 1954	Dinamo Târgu Mureș	1–1	Știința București	Sibiu

4 November 1954	Progresul Bistrița	2–1	Metalul Satu Mare	Sibiu

4 November 1954	Metalul AMEFA Arad	3–0	Metalul 131 Tohan	Sibiu

7 November 1954	Progresul Bistrița	1–0	Știința București	Sibiu

7 November 1954	Dinamo Târgu Mureș	2–1	Flamura Roșie Salonta	Sibiu

8 November 1954	Metalul AMEFA Arad	2–0	Metalul Satu Mare	Sibiu

11 November 1954	Progresul Bistrița	0–0	Dinamo Târgu Mureș	Sibiu

11 November 1954	Metalul AMEFA Arad	1–1	Flamura Roșie Salonta	Sibiu

11 November 1954	Știința București	1–0	Metalul 131 Tohan	Sibiu

14 November 1954	Flamura Roșie Salonta	2–1	Metalul Satu Mare	Sibiu

14 November 1954	Metalul 131 Tohan	1–0	Progresul Bistrița	Sibiu

14 November 1954	Metalul AMEFA Arad	2–1	Știința București	Sibiu

18 November 1954	Știința București	2–1	Metalul Satu Mare	Sibiu

18 November 1954	Flamura Roșie Salonta	2–1	Progresul Bistrița	Sibiu

18 November 1954	Dinamo Târgu Mureș	1–4	Metalul 131 Tohan	Sibiu

21 November 1954	Dinamo Târgu Mureș	0–0	Metalul AMEFA Arad	Sibiu

21 November 1954	Metalul Satu Mare	0–0	Metalul 131 Tohan	Sibiu

21 November 1954	Știința București	2–1	Flamura Roșie Salonta	Sibiu

== Championships standings ==
=== Bacău Region ===
Pos	Team	Pld	W	D	L	GF	GA	GD	Pts	Qualification or relegation
1	Flacăra Moinești (C, Q)	21	16	3	2	60	21	+39	35	Qualification to promotion play-off
2	Constructorul Bicaz (Note: Metalul Bicaz was renamed Constructorul Bicaz before the second half of the season.)	21	15	3	3	57	23	+34	33	
3	Avântul Piatra Neamț	21	13	5	3	58	20	+38	31	
4	Avântul Steaua Roșie Bacău	21	11	2	8	33	33	0	24	
5	Locomotiva Târgu Ocna	21	7	6	8	33	34	−1	20	
6	Flacăra Dărmănești	21	8	4	9	43	38	+5	20	
7	Minerul Comănești	21	7	2	12	32	43	−11	16	
8	Flamura Roșie Abator Bacău	21	5	6	10	31	44	−13	16	
9	Flacăra Târgu Ocna	21	5	2	14	25	51	−26	12	
10	Dinamo Onești	21	2	5	14	17	42	−25	9	
11	Metalul Bacău	21	2	1	18	20	74	−54	5	
12	Reconstrucția Piatra Neamț (Note: Reconstrucția Piatra Neamț withdrew after the first half of the season.) (D)	11	5	4	2	23	13	+10	14	Withdrew

Rules for classification: 1) points; 2) goal difference; 3) number of goals scored.
(C) Champions; (D) Disqualified; (Q) Qualified for the phase indicated

=== Pitești Region ===
Pos	Team	Pld	W	D	L	GF	GA	GD	Pts	Qualification or relegation
1	Flamura Roșie Râmnicu Vâlcea (C, Q)	26	22	2	2	75	18	+57	46	Qualification to promotion play-off
2	Minerul Câmpulung	26	19	4	3	69	20	+49	42	
3	Dinamo Pitești	26	18	4	4	67	23	+44	40	
4	Metalul IMS Câmpulung	26	14	3	9	63	45	+18	31	
5	Constructorul Râmnicu Vâlcea	26	11	8	7	42	26	+16	30	
6	Progresul Câmpulung	26	13	2	11	62	45	+17	28	
7	Flamura Roșie Curtea de Argeș	26	10	4	12	53	63	−10	24	
8	Locomotiva Pitești	26	8	6	12	42	52	−10	22	
9	Flamura Roșie Pitești	26	9	3	14	28	35	−7	21	
10	Oltul Râmnicu Vâlcea	26	9	3	14	39	51	−12	21	
11	Progresul Găești	26	6	8	12	45	62	−17	20	
12	Progresul Drăgășani	26	7	5	14	42	66	−24	19	
13	Avântul Stâlpeni	26	6	2	18	33	90	−57	14	
14	Avântul Brezoi	26	1	2	23	15	83	−68	4	

Rules for classification: 1) points; 2) goal difference; 3) number of goals scored.
(C) Champions; (Q) Qualified for the phase indicated

=== Ploiești Region ===
Pos	Team	Pld	W	D	L	GF	GA	GD	Pts	Qualification or relegation
1	Metalul 113 Plopeni (C, Q)	26	22	2	2	82	15	+67	46	Qualification to promotion play-off
2	Metalul Târgoviște	26	21	3	2	80	21	+59	45	
3	Flacăra Târgoviște	26	15	5	6	65	39	+26	35	
4	Locomotiva Buzău	26	12	7	7	44	41	+3	31	
5	Flacăra Câmpina	26	12	4	10	57	44	+13	28	
6	Metalul Sinaia	26	10	7	9	48	42	+6	27	
7	Constructorul Fieni	26	9	6	11	44	51	−7	24	
8	Flacăra Băicoi	26	9	6	11	49	58	−9	24	
9	Metalul II 114 Mija	26	9	5	12	40	38	+2	23	
10	Feroemail Ploiești	26	7	4	15	40	67	−27	18	
11	Flacăra Ochiuri	26	6	5	15	24	58	−34	17	
12	Flamura Roșie Râmnicu Sărat	26	8	0	18	34	72	−38	16	
13	Flacăra GRT Moreni	26	6	3	17	31	56	−25	15	
14	Avântul Măneciu	26	6	3	17	44	80	−36	15	

Rules for classification: 1) points; 2) goal difference; 3) number of goals scored.
(C) Champions; (Q) Qualified for the phase indicated

=== Suceava Region ===
Pos	Team	Pld	W	D	L	GF	GA	GD	Pts	Qualification or relegation
1	Avântul Fălticeni (C, Q)	26	22	2	2	135	24	+111	46	Qualification to promotion play-off
2	Progresul Rădăuți	26	20	1	5	86	31	+55	41	
3	Locomotiva Câmpulung Moldovenesc	26	16	5	5	73	27	+46	37	
4	Dinamo Rădăuți	26	16	4	6	59	28	+31	36	
5	Voința Dorohoi	26	15	5	6	75	35	+40	35	
6	Dinamo Dorohoi	26	14	5	7	60	28	+32	33	
7	Flamura Roșie Botoșani	26	14	2	10	61	41	+20	30	
8	Avântul Moldovița	26	10	3	13	48	59	−11	23	
9	Voința Fălticeni	26	10	2	14	56	72	−16	22	
10	Progresul Siret	26	10	2	14	43	82	−39	22	
11	Avântul Gura Humorului	26	8	0	18	30	77	−47	16	
12	Avântul Vatra Dornei	26	6	0	20	34	121	−87	12	
13	Avântul Putna	26	4	1	21	26	104	−78	9	
14	Flamura Roșie Burdujeni II	26	1	0	25	10	77	−67	2	

Rules for classification: 1) points; 2) goal difference; 3) number of goals scored.
(C) Champions; (Q) Qualified for the phase indicated

== See also ==
- 1954 Divizia A
- 1954 Divizia B
- 1954 Cupa României
