= Liviu Goian =

Romanian footballer (born 1965)

Personal information
- Date of birth: 18 November 1965 (age 60)
- Place of birth: Dej, Romania
- Height: 1.85 m (6 ft 1 in)
- Positions: Central defender; defensive midfielder

Senior career*
Years	Team	Apps	(Gls)
1981–1991	CSM Suceava (Note: The statistics for the 1985–86, 1986–87, 1988–89 and 1989–90 Divizia B seasons are unavailable.)	20	(0)
1991–1993	FC Bacău	33	(0)
1993–2000	Debrecen	200	(7)
1995	→ Bucovina Suceava (loan)	11	(0)
Total		264	(7)

International career
1986	Romania B	2	(0)
- * Club domestic league appearances and goals

Liviu Goian (born 18 November 1965) is a Romanian former professional footballer who played as a central defender and defensive midfielder.

== Club career ==
Goian was born on 18 November 1965 in Dej, Romania and began playing senior-level football in 1981, aged 15 at CSM Suceava in the Romanian lower leagues. He helped the team earn promotion to Divizia A in 1987, making his debut in the competition on 23 August in a 3–1 home victory against FCM Brașov. However, Suceava was relegated after only one season, but Goian remained with the team for three more seasons in Divizia B. In 1991, he returned to Divizia A football, joining FC Bacău. On 21 March 1993 he made his last appearance in the Romanian first league in Bacău's 2–2 draw against Brașov, totaling 53 matches in the competition.

In 1993, he went abroad to Hungarian side, Debrecen where he was teammates with fellow Romanians Nicolae Ilea, Radu Sabo, Emil Răducu and Cornel Cașolțan. Goian made his Nemzeti Bajnokság I debut on 14 August 1993 under coach Lajos Garamvölgyi in a 2–1 victory with Videoton in which he scored a goal. He played seven games in the 1998 Intertoto Cup campaign as the team got past Dnepr-Transmash Mogilev, Hradec Králové and Hansa Rostock, reaching the semi-finals where they were defeated by Ruch Chorzów. Goian won the first trophy of his career when coach Garamvölgyi used him the entire match in the 2–1 win over Tatabánya in the 1998–99 Magyar Kupa final. In the following season he played in both legs of the 3–2 aggregate loss to VfL Wolfsburg in the 1999–2000 UEFA Cup first round. Goian made his last Hungarian league appearance, playing for Debrecen on 27 May 2000 in a 3–1 home win over MTK Budapest.

== International career ==
In 1986, Goian played two games for Romania B against Italy and the Soviet Union.

== After retirement ==
After ending his playing career, he worked as a sports agent, served as president at SC Bacău and became a businessman.

== Personal life ==
Goian's brothers Gigi, Lucian and Dorin were also professional footballers, all of them having played in the Romanian top-division Divizia A. He also has three sisters.

== Honours ==
CSM Suceava

- Divizia B: 1986–87

Debrecen

- Magyar Kupa: 1998–99
