= Alexandru Buziuc =

Romanian footballer (born 1994)

Personal information
- Full name: Alexandru Daniel Buziuc
- Date of birth: 15 March 1994 (age 32)
- Place of birth: Suceava, Romania
- Height: 1.79 m (5 ft 10 1/2 in)
- Position: Forward

Team information
- Current team: Minaur Baia Mare
- Number: 9

Youth career
- 2001–2009: Viitorul Liteni
- 2009–2011: Sporting Suceava

Senior career*
Years	Team	Apps	(Gls)
2011–2013	Sporting Suceava	39	(18)
2013–2014	Vaslui	17	(0)
2014–2019	Gaz Metan Mediaș	80	(8)
2015	→ Rapid CFR Suceava (loan)	15	(1)
2019–2020	Academica Clinceni	54	(12)
2020–2021	FCSB	22	(1)
2021–2023	Mioveni	59	(7)
2023	CSA Steaua București	12	(1)
2024	Ceahlăul Piatra Neamț	10	(4)
2024–2025	Gloria Bistrița-Năsăud		
2025–2026	Corvinul Hunedoara	24	(2)
2026–	Minaur Baia Mare	0	(0)

International career
2014	Romania U21	2	(0)
- * Club domestic league appearances and goals as of 16 May 2026

Alexandru Daniel Buziuc (born 15 March 1994) is a Romanian professional footballer who plays as a forward for Liga III club Minaur Baia Mare.

== Career statistics ==
As of match played 16 May 2026

Appearances and goals by club, season and competition
Club	Season	League			Cupa României		Cupa Ligii		Europe		Other		Total	
Club	Season	Division	Apps	Goals	Apps	Goals	Apps	Goals	Apps	Goals	Apps	Goals	Apps	Goals
Sporting Suceava	2011–12	Liga III	28	12	0	0	—		—		—		28	12
Sporting Suceava	2012–13	Liga III	11	6	2	1	—		—		—		13	7
Sporting Suceava	Total		39	18	2	1	—		—		—		41	19
Vaslui	2012–13	Liga I	2	0	–		—		—		—		2	0
Vaslui	2013–14	Liga I	15	0	1	0	—		—		—		16	0
Vaslui	Total		17	0	1	0	—		—		—		18	0
Rapid Suceava (loan)	2014–15	Liga II	15	1	—		—		—		—		15	1
Gaz Metan Mediaș	2014–15	Liga I	9	0	1	0	1	0	—		—		11	0
Gaz Metan Mediaș	2015–16	Liga II	21	4	0	0	0	0	—		—		21	4
Gaz Metan Mediaș	2016–17	Liga I	22	4	2	1	1	0	—		—		25	5
Gaz Metan Mediaș	2017–18	Liga I	17	0	2	0	—		—		—		19	0
Gaz Metan Mediaș	2018–19	Liga I	11	0	2	0	—		—		—		13	0
Gaz Metan Mediaș	Total		80	8	7	1	2	0	—		—		89	9
Academica Clinceni	2018–19	Liga II	16	7	—		—		—		—		16	7
Academica Clinceni	2019–20	Liga I	38	5	2	0	—		—		—		38	5
Academica Clinceni	Total		54	12	2	0	—		—		—		54	12
FCSB	2020–21	Liga I	22	1	1	0	—		2 (Note: Appearances in UEFA Europa League)	1	—		25	2
Mioveni	2021–22	Liga I	33	5	1	0	—		—		—		34	5
Mioveni	2022–23	Liga I	26	2	1	1	—		—		—		27	3
Mioveni	Total		59	7	2	1	—		—		—		61	8
CSA Steaua București	2023–24	Liga II	12	1	4	0	—		—		—		16	1
Ceahlăul Piatra Neamț	2023–24	Liga II	10	4	—		—		—		—		10	4
Gloria Bistrița-Năsăud	2024–25	Liga III	?	?	?	?	—		—		2 (Note: Appearances in Liga III promotion play-offs)	0	2	0
Corvinul Hunedoara	2025–26	Liga II	24	2	2	0	—		—		—		26	2
Minaur Baia Mare	2025–26	Liga III	0	0	0	0	—		—		—		0	0
Career total			332	54	21	3	2	0	2	1	2	0	359	58

== Honours ==
Gaz Metan Mediaș

- Liga II: 2015–16

FCSB

- Supercupa României runner-up: 2020

Gloria Bistrița

- Liga III: 2024–25

Corvinul Hunedoara

- Liga II: 2025–26
