= Cosmin Tucaliuc =

Romanian footballer (born 2000)

Personal information
- Full name: Cosmin Constantin Tucaliuc
- Date of birth: 13 May 2000 (age 26)
- Place of birth: Suceava, Romania
- Height: 1.74 m (5 ft 9 in)
- Positions: Attacking midfielder; winger

Team information
- Current team: Cetatea Suceava
- Number: 20

Youth career
- Sporting Suceava
- –2014: Luceafărul Bucovina Suceava
- 2014–2019: Gheorghe Hagi Academy

Senior career*
Years	Team	Apps	(Gls)
2019–2021	Viitorul Constanța	0	(0)
2019–2021	→ SCM Gloria Buzău (loan)	45	(8)
2021–2025	Farul Constanța	0	(0)
2021–2023	→ Petrolul Ploiești (loan)	37	(1)
2023–2024	→ Concordia Chiajna (loan)	20	(0)
2024–2025	→ CSM Reşiţa (loan)	20	(0)
2025–	Cetatea Suceava	23	(9)

International career
2016	Romania U15	2	(0)
2016	Romania U16	3	(0)
2016–2017	Romania U17	3	(0)
2017	Romania U18	1	(0)
- * Club domestic league appearances and goals as of 26 October 2026

Cosmin Constantin Tucaliuc (born 13 May 2000) is a Romanian professional footballer who plays as an attacking midfielder or a winger for Liga II club Cetatea Suceava.

== Club career ==
Tucaliuc made his professional debut for Petrolul Ploiești on 25 July 2022, in a 0–2 Liga I loss to UTA Arad.

== Honours ==
Petrolul Ploiești

- Liga II: 2021–22

Cetatea Suceava

- Liga III: 2025–26
