= Daniel Bălan =

Romanian footballer

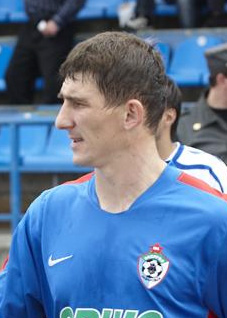

Personal information
- Date of birth: 18 September 1979 (age 47)
- Place of birth: Suceava, Romania
- Height: 1.75 m (5 ft 9 in)
- Position: Right back

Team information
- Current team: Cetatea Suceava (head of youth development)

Youth career
- –1997: Bucovina Suceava

Senior career*
Years	Team	Apps	(Gls)
1996–1997	Bucovina Suceava	1	(1)
1997–1998	Foresta II Suceava	27	(0)
1998–2001	Foresta Suceava	55	(3)
2001–2010	Steaua București	35	(0)
2005	→ Vaslui (loan)	15	(0)
2006	→ Omonia Nicosia (loan)	13	(1)
2007	→ Argeș Pitești (loan)	7	(1)
2007–2009	→ Alki Larnaca (loan)	45	(0)
2009	→ Aris Limassol (loan)	7	(0)
2010	→ SKA-Energiya Khabarovsk (loan)	30	(0)
2010–2011	SKA-Energiya Khabarovsk	22	(0)
2012	Botoşani	9	(0)
2012–2017	Foresta Suceava	127	(8)
2017–2019	Bucovina Rădăuți		
Total		393	(13)

International career
2000–2002	Romania U21	10	(0)

Managerial career
- 2016: Rapid CFR Suceava (player/coach)
- 2017: Bucovina Rădăuți (player/coach)
- 2017–2019: Bucovina Rădăuți (player/assistant)
- 2019–2020: Bucovina Rădăuți (assistant)
- 2020–2024: Foresta Suceava (assistant)
- 2024–: Cetatea Suceava (head of youth development)
- 2025: Cetatea Suceava (caretaker)
- * Club domestic league appearances and goals

Daniel Bălan (born 18 September 1979) is a Romanian former professional footballer who played as a right back, currently head of youth development at Liga II club Cetatea Suceava.

== Career ==
In 2002, he suffered a severe injury, something similar with the one Dutch player Marco van Basten had. After 18 months and multiple surgeries, he returned to the football pitch once more.

== Honours ==
=== Player ===
Foresta Suceava

- Divizia B: 1999–00

Steaua București

- Divizia A: 2005–06
- Supercupa României: 2001, 2006

Vaslui

- Divizia B: 2004–05

Omonia

- Cypriot Cup runner-up: 2006–07

Bucovina Rădăuți

- Liga IV – Suceava County: 2016–17

=== Coach ===
Bucovina Rădăuți

- Liga IV – Suceava County: 2016–17
