= Marius Onciu =

Romanian footballer

Personal information
- Full name: Marius Gheorghe Onciu
- Date of birth: 23 April 1987 (age 39)
- Place of birth: Suceava, Romania
- Position: Defensive midfielder

Youth career
- Cetatea Suceava

Senior career*
Years	Team	Apps	(Gls)
2005–2009	Cetatea Suceava	67	(4)
2009–2015	Ceahlăul Piatra Neamţ	77	(2)
2015–2016	Rapid CFR Suceava	20	(0)
- * Club domestic league appearances and goals as of 9 February 2016

Marius Onciu (born 23 April 1987) is a former Romanian footballer. He played for Ceahlăul Piatra Neamţ club in Liga I in the 2009–10 season.
