= Lucian Goian =

Romanian footballer (born 1983)

Personal information
- Date of birth: 10 February 1983 (age 43)
- Place of birth: Suceava, Romania
- Height: 1.85 m (6 ft 1 in)
- Position: Centre-back

Youth career
- –1997: Bucovina Suceava
- 1997–2001: Foresta Suceava

Senior career*
| Years | Team | Apps | (Gls) |
| 2001–2002 | Foresta Suceava | 20 | (1) |
| 2003 | FC Onești | 21 | (0) |
| 2004 | Ceahlăul Piatra Neamț | 13 | (3) |
| 2004–2006 | Dinamo București | 17 | (0) |
| 2006 | → Ceahlăul Piatra Neamț (loan) | 13 | (0) |
| 2007 | Ceahlăul Piatra Neamț | 15 | (1) |
| 2007–2010 | Dinamo București | 53 | (1) |
| 2010–2011 | Astra Ploiești | 38 | (1) |
| 2012 | Tianjin Teda | 27 | (2) |
| 2013–2014 | Beijing Baxy | 46 | (7) |
| 2014–2015 | FC Brașov | 15 | (0) |
| 2015–2016 | CFR Cluj | 24 | (0) |
| 2016–2019 | Mumbai City | 50 | (3) |
| 2017 | → Perth Glory (loan) | 6 | (0) |
| 2019–2020 | Chennaiyin | 20 | (2) |
| Total | | 378 | (21) |

International career
| 2004–2005 | Romania U21 | 12 | (0) |
- * Club domestic league appearances and goals

Lucian Goian (born 10 February 1983) is a Romanian former professional footballer who played as a centre-back.

== Club career ==
=== Foresta Suceava and FC Onești ===
Goian was born on 10 February 1983 in Suceava, Romania and began playing junior-level football under the guidance of coach Ilie Gafencu at local club Foresta. He started playing senior-level football at Foresta in the 2001–02 Divizia B season. Subsequently, in the middle of the following season, he moved to FC Onești in the same league, where he spent one year.

=== Ceahlăul and Dinamo ===
In 2004, Goian joined Ceahlăul Piatra Neamț, making his Liga I debut on 13 March when coach Marius Lăcătuș sent him in the 29th minute to replace Tiberiu Șerban in a 5–1 loss to Petrolul Ploiești in which he scored his side's goal. Until the end of the season he netted two more goals, one in a 3–1 win over Gloria Bistrița and the other in a 1–1 draw against Steaua București, but the team was relegated to the second division.

In the following season, Goian went to Dinamo București. There, he made his debut in European competitions when coach Ioan Andone sent him in the 52nd minute to replace Andrei Mărgăritescu in a 2–1 home loss to Manchester United in the 2004–05 Champions League third qualifying round. By the end of the season, during the final minutes of a game against Rapid București he made a critical error. He attempted to pass the ball to goalkeeper Bogdan Stelea, but opponent Lucian Burdujan intercepted it and scored. The game ended in a 2–2 draw, and the lost points proved decisive, as rivals Steaua became champions. However, the team managed to win the Cupa României, but Andone did not use him in the 1–0 win over Farul Constanța in the final. Next season, he secured his second trophy with Dinamo. This came after Andone substituted him for Gabriel Tamaș at halftime in their 3–2 victory against Steaua, a win that also marked their first Supercupa României. Goian also helped them eliminate Everton with a historical 5–2 on aggregate, reaching the group stage of the 2005–06 UEFA Cup. He was loaned back to Ceahlăul for the second half of the season, helping the club earn promotion from the second league to the first.

In the 2006–07 season, he returned to Dinamo, coach Mircea Rednic using him in seven league matches in the first half of the season. However, Goian left the team again to play for Ceahlăul, but Dinamo still managed to win the title without him. He also appeared in five matches in the 2006–07 UEFA Cup campaign, as Dinamo got past the group stage and reached the round of 32 of the competition.

In August 2007, Goian was transferred back to Dinamo which needed a defender following Cosmin Moți's injury. The team had the objective of reaching the Champions League group stage. Goian received a red card in the final minutes in the draw in the first leg of the third qualifying round against Lazio Roma, but they did not qualify, losing with 3–1 the second leg. On 15 September he scored his first league goal for The Red Dogs after receiving the ball from a corner kick executed by Claudiu Niculescu in a 5–2 win over Politehnica Iași. He made four appearances for the club in the group stage of the 2009–10 Europa League, having a career total of 14 matches in European competitions, all of them for Dinamo.

=== Astra Ploiești ===
In 2010, Goian joined Astra Ploiești, signing a contract for two years. He scored his only goal for the club on 5 November 2011 in a Ploiești derby when he equalized in the 1–1 draw against Petrolul Ploiești.

=== Tianjin Teda and Beijing Baxy ===
In January 2012, Goian moved to China, putting pen on paper with Tianjin Teda. He made his official debut for Tianjin on 25 February when coach Josip Kuže used him the entire match in a 2–1 CFA Super Cup defeat to Guangzhou Evergrande. In his single season spent with the club he appeared in 27 Chinese Super League games, scoring two goals in two 1–1 draws against Changchun Yatai and Henan Jianye. He also appeared in five games in the 2012 AFC Champions League group stage, scoring once in a 1–1 draw against Seongnam.

Goian signed a contract with China League One side Beijing Baxy in February 2013. In the first of this two-season spell he scored the first double of his career in a 2–1 win over BIT, being voted by coaches, teammates, journalists and supporters as Baxy's best footballer in 2013.

=== FC Brașov and CFR Cluj ===
In February 2015, Goian signed with FC Brașov, but could not avoid the team's relegation to the second league at the end of the season.

He spent the 2015–16 season at CFR Cluj, managing to win the Cupa României, but coach Toni Conceição did not use him in the final. On 29 May 2016, Goian made his last Liga I appearance, playing in a 4–0 away loss to FC Botoșani, totaling 175 matches with six goals in the competition.

=== Mumbai City and Perth Glory ===
Goian went to play for Mumbai City in 2016, where he was teammates with Diego Forlán, making his Indian Super League debut on 3 October under coach Alexandre Guimarães in a 1–0 away victory against Pune City. On 19 November he scored his first goal in a 5–0 win over Kerala Blasters. He was named the league's best central defender and was included in the best XI of the 2016 season.

On 21 March 2017, Goian joined A-League club Perth Glory as a short-term injury replacement for Shane Lowry and Alex Grant. Coach Kenny Lowe gave him his debut on 26 March in a 3–0 loss to FC Sydney, in which he scored an unfortunate own goal. He departed the Glory in May 2017.

In July 2017, he rejoined Mumbai City on a two-year contract and was appointed as the team's captain due his leadership skills and experience in the league.

=== Chennaiyin ===
In August 2019, he joined Chennaiyin where he was a colleague of compatriot Dragoș Firțulescu. Goian scored his first goal in a 1–0 win over his former team, Mumbai City which helped his side mathematically qualify to the playoffs. In the semi-finals he scored a goal in the 4–1 victory against Goa in the first leg, then an own goal in the second-leg loss, but the team managed to go further in the competition. In the final, coach John Gregory used Goian the entire match in the eventual 3–1 loss to Atlético de Kolkata. For the way he played, Goian was named the league's best central defender and was included in the best XI of the season.

== International career ==
Goian played 12 games for Romania's under-21 national team, including seven games in the 2006 European Under-21 Championship qualifiers. He was banned alongside teammate Ianis Zicu from representing his country at any level for two years in 2004, because the Romanian Football Federation considered they had a "defiant attitude" during a 4–1 loss against Czech Republic U21.

== Personal life ==
Goian is the younger brother of former professional footballers Gigi, Liviu and Dorin, all of them having played in the Romanian top-division Liga I. He also has three sisters. He has a son named Luca.

== Honours ==
Dinamo București

- Liga I: 2006–07
- Cupa României: 2004–05
- Supercupa României: 2005

Ceahlăul

- Divizia B: 2005–06

CFR Cluj

- Cupa României: 2015–16

Chennaiyin

- Indian Super League runner-up: 2019–20
