= Dorin Goian =

Romanian association football player (born 1980)

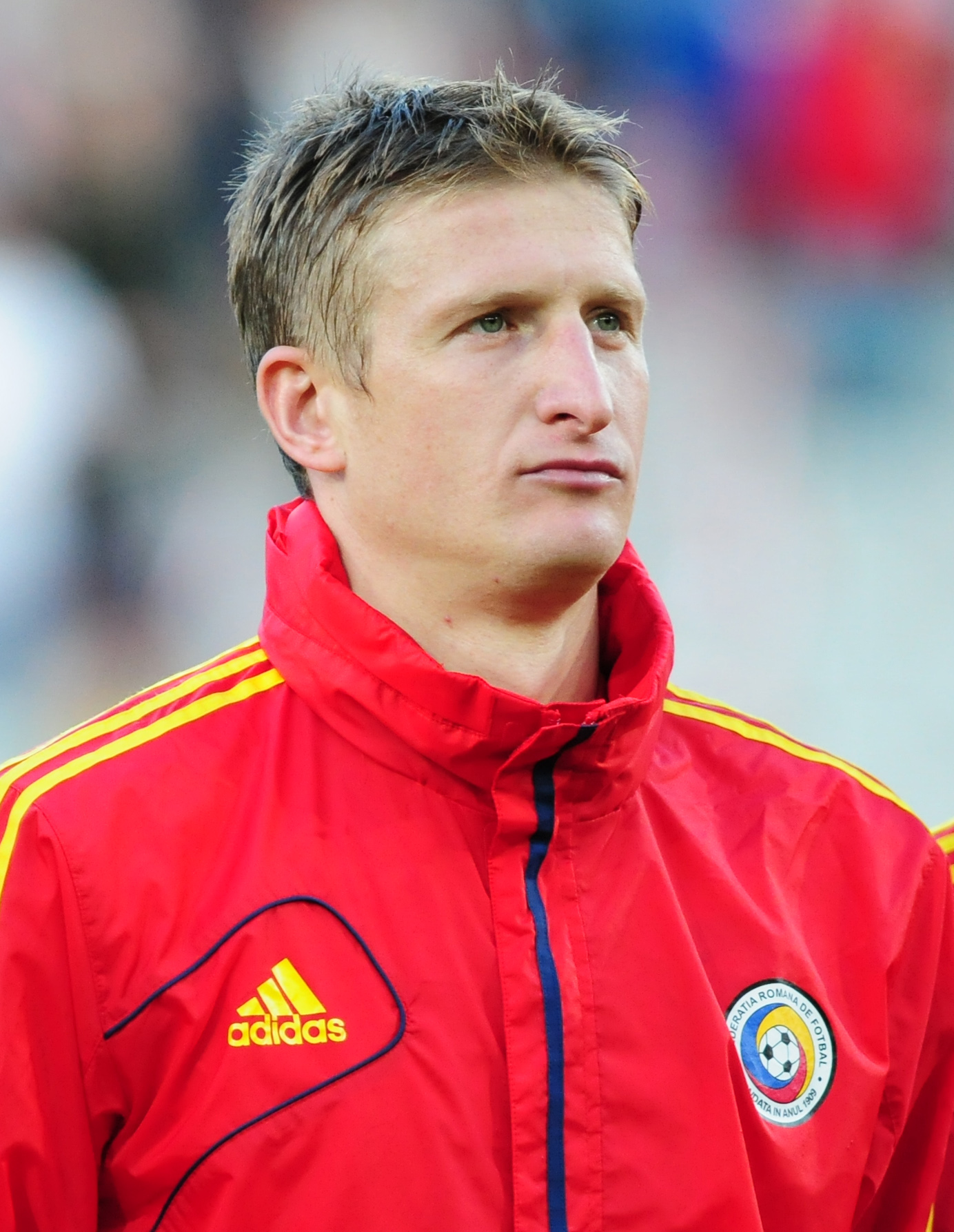
- Goian in June 2012

Personal information
- Full name: Dorin Nicolae Goian
- Date of birth: 12 December 1980 (age 45)
- Place of birth: Suceava, Romania
- Height: 1.94 m (6 ft 4 in)
- Position: Centre-back

Youth career
- –1997: Bucovina Suceava

Senior career*
Years	Team	Apps	(Gls)
1997–1999	Foresta II Fălticeni	15	(0)
1999–2001	Foresta Suceava	28	(2)
2000	→ Gloria Buzău (loan)	19	(0)
2002–2003	Ceahlăul Piatra Neamț	45	(2)
2004	FCM Bacău	26	(2)
2005–2009	Steaua București	107	(6)
2009–2011	Palermo	30	(0)
2011–2013	Rangers	35	(1)
2012–2013	→ Spezia (loan)	26	(2)
2013–2016	Asteras Tripolis	69	(2)
Total		400	(17)

International career
2005–2015	Romania	60	(5)

Managerial career
- 2016–2017: Foresta Suceava (president)
- 2017–2020: Bucovina Rădăuți
- 2020: Foresta Suceava
- 2022–2023: Foresta Suceava
- 2024–2025: Cetatea Suceava (technical director)
- 2025: Cetatea Suceava
- * Club domestic league appearances and goals

Dorin Nicolae Goian (born 12 December 1980) is a Romanian professional football manager and former player.

== Club career ==
=== Early years (1997–2005) ===
In 1997, he signed for Foresta Fălticeni, a football club from Suceava County, where he played for the club's second team. Two years later, he was promoted to the first team. He made his first appearance in the Divizia A in 2000, when he was 20 years old in a match versus Gloria Bistriţa. It was a happy début for the young centre back, as his team won the match 2–0. During his Foresta Fălticeni years, he was also loaned to Gloria Buzău for a few months in 2000.

Goian was noticed by the officials of Ceahlăul Piatra Neamţ, a midtable team from the Romanian First Division, and he was transferred there in the middle of the 2002–03 season. After the 2003–04 season, Ceahlăul were relegated to the second division. Goian, however, signed a contract with another midtable team from the first division, FCM Bacău.

In 2003, he signed with FCM Bacău and played for them in 26 league games, scoring two goals. While he was playing there, Goian was called up to the Romania national team due to his impressive league performances. After a great 2004–05 season with Bacău, Goian managed to impress Steaua București's scouts.

=== Steaua București (2005–2009) ===
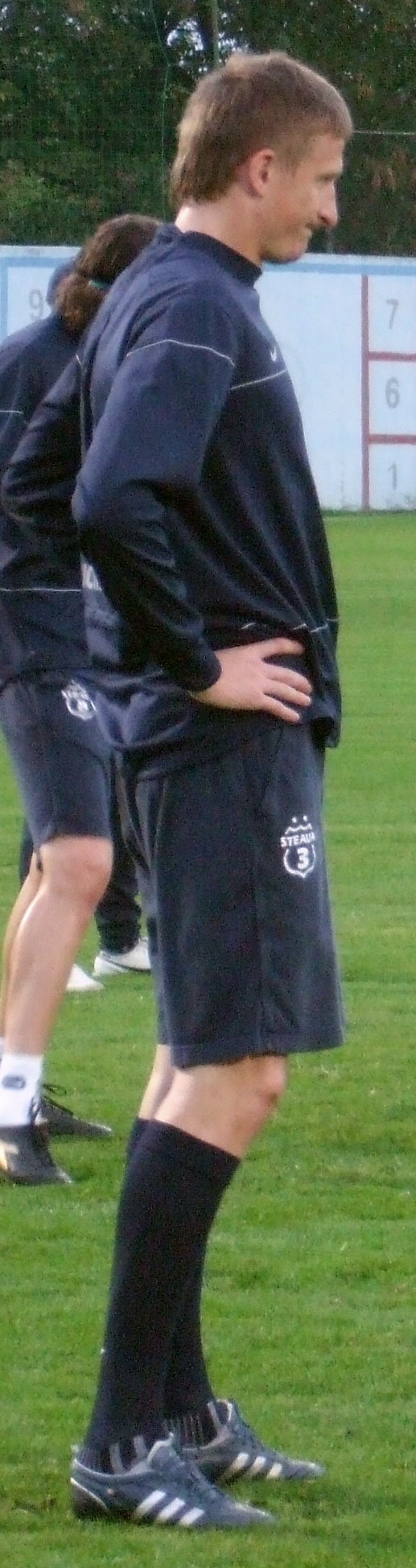
Goian at a training session with Steaua Bucharest

On 4 March 2005, Goian signed a five-year contract with Steaua București. Steaua paid €100,000 in 2005 and €1 million in 2007 for Goian. Even though he only played four games in his initial season with Steaua, Goian continued to fight for a place in the starting eleven and starting with the 2005–06 season, the young centre back managed to win the trust of his coach.

Goian scored his first goal in the UEFA Cup, against Vålerenga for Steaua with a perfect header inside the box. He soon became a top scorer for Steaua in the 2005–06 UEFA Cup season after scoring against RC Lens, Halmstads BK, and also SC Heerenveen. He scored his team's second goal in the 4–2 loss away at Middlesbrough in the UEFA Cup semi-final, when Steaua were denied qualification in the final by conceding a goal in the 89th minute (they had won the home leg 1–0 and had taken a 2–0 lead in the away game 25 minutes in).

In the 2007–08 UEFA Champions League season, Steaua played against Zagłębie Lubin and BATE Borisov in order to qualify in the group stage. With the help of Goian, who scored against both teams, Steaua managed to qualify in the group stage. He would then score again for Steaua against Slavia Prague, but it was not enough, and Steaua lost the game with 2–1.

Goian was captain for the first time for Steaua on 24 October 2007 against Sevilla when Nicolae Dică, the first captain, was substituted. The match ended 2–1 for Sevilla.

As Goian was co-owned with FCM Bacău, the team from which he transferred to Steaua, there was a clause in his contract that stated that if he would be sold to a foreign club, Steaua would have to pay Bacău 50% off the transfer fee, but not more than €1 million. On 16 October 2007, Steaua paid €1 million to Bacău and bought the rest of his rights.

On 4 April 2009, Goian was named captain against Gloria Bistrita, as the main captain Sorin Ghionea was injured. Although Petre Marin was the oldest player of the team, coach Marius Lacatus considered that Goian would make a better captain. The match ended with Steaua's victory, Kapetanos scoring the only goal. He scored his first goal of the 2008–09 season with a successful penalty against Oţelul Galaţi. The game ended with Steaua's victory by five goals, being their largest win this season so far.

On 30 July 2009, he captained Steaua's victory with 3–0 against Motherwell F.C. and also contributed at the first goal with a header which led to an own goal by Motherwell's Stephen Craigan. He also missed a penalty for which he was heavily criticised by chairman Gigi Becali, who decided to take him off the penalty kicker list.

=== Palermo (2009–2011) ===
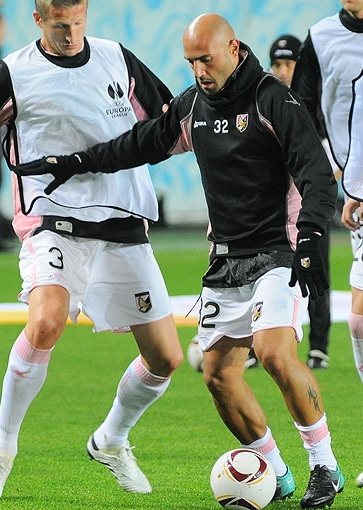
Goian (left) and Maccarone (right) training prior to the Europa League match against CSKA Moscow

On 6 August 2009, Palermo showed interest in the central defender and bought him for €2m. There he met up once again with his former coach, Walter Zenga, with his contract paying him €550,000 per season as salary. He played his first game in a Palermo shirt in a friendly against Mallorca, of which the match ended as a 2–0 for the Spanish opposition. Goian's Serie A début came against Roma, a match in which he played the full 90 minutes.

In his first season at the club, Goian was mostly used as a covering replacement for defensive regulars Simon Kjær and Cesare Bovo. Following Kjær's departure to Steve McClaren's VfL Wolfsburg in the Bundesliga, Goian was originally expected to achieve considerably more first team opportunities; however, he sustained a number of injuries which prevented him from doing so. Upon fully recovering and returning to the starting lineup later in March, and in doing so making his first 2011 appearance in the league, Goian scored the winning goal against league-leaders A.C. Milan; and coincidentally, it was also Goian's first Serie A league goal, as well as his first goal as Palermo player.

=== Rangers (2011–13) ===
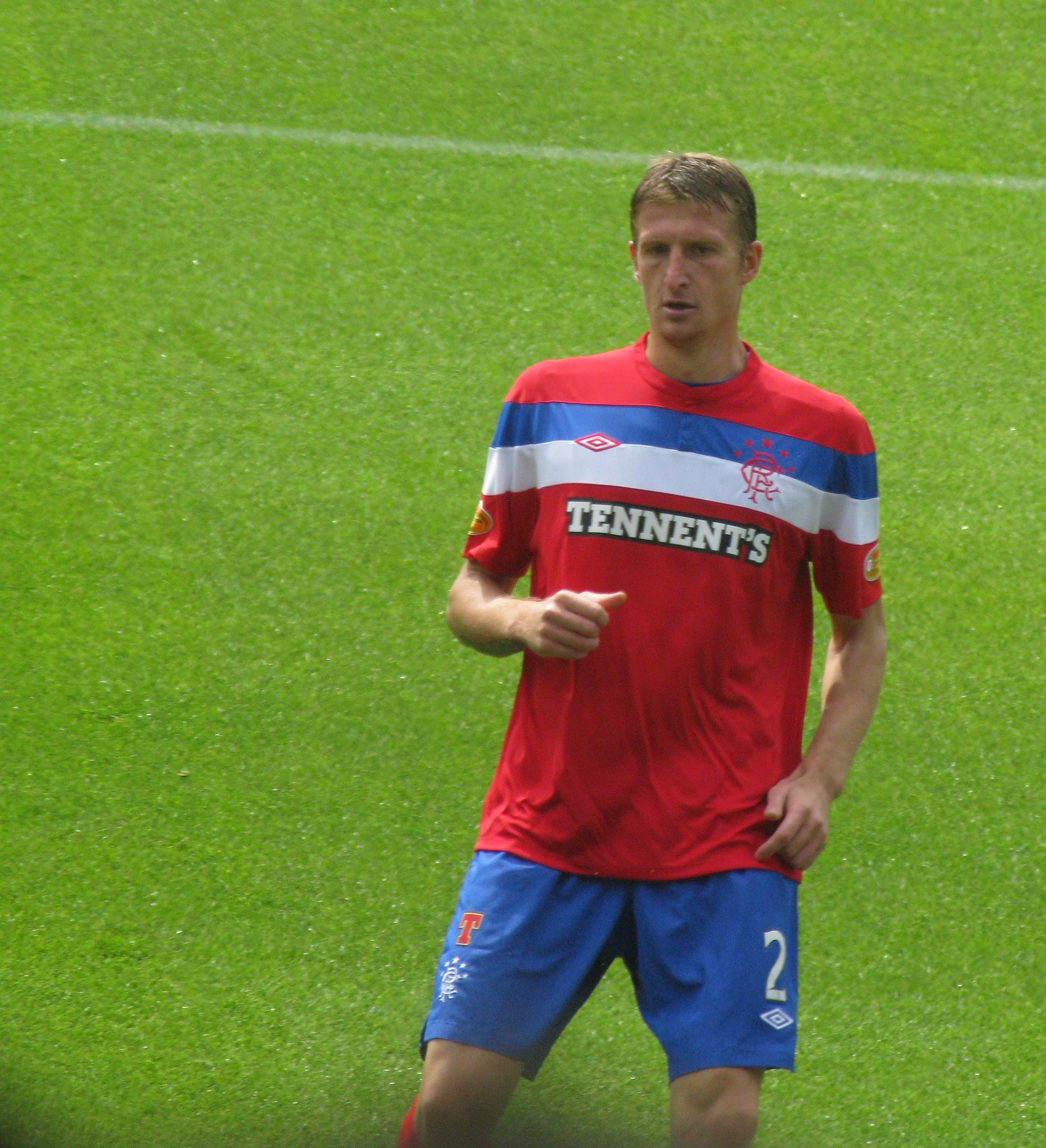
Goian warming up for Rangers

On 25 July, Palermo agreed an undisclosed fee with Scottish Champions Rangers regarding Goian, who subsequently signed a three-year contract. On 29 July, Goian received his work permit, and made his Rangers debut the following day against St Johnstone in a 2–0 win, which was also his new manager Ally McCoist's first win in charge of the Glasgow-based club. He was due to play his first European Champions League Qualifier for Rangers on 4 August 2011 after successfully appealing to UEFA who earlier deemed him ineligible. He injured his hamstring and was unable to play. Goian made his Old Firm debut on 18 September 2011 in a 4–2 victory and was praised heavily by the Rangers fans. Goian quickly became a fans favourite at Rangers putting in many consistent and impressive displays. Goian formed a strong partnership with Carlos Bocanegra who also signed for the SPL Champions in the same transfer window and the pair cemented their places in the side as first choice centre backs. He scored his first goal for Rangers in a 3–2 defeat to Falkirk in the Scottish League Cup on 21 September 2011.

After Rangers FC went into administration in June 2012, the companies' assets were purchased by Charles Green's consortium including the players' contracts. After insisting he would stay no matter what, when news broke that Rangers were set to play in the Third Division, Goian had a change of heart. However, he featured for Rangers in their 2–1 win against Brechin City in the Challenge Cup. At the end of the 2012–13 season, Goian announced his intention to play in England in near future. Eventually, Goian, along with Carlos Bocanegra was released by the club, ending his two years at the club and in total, Goian made 30 appearances; scoring once. Upon his release, The Herald reports that Goian received £430,000 (€500,000), according to his agent.

=== Spezia (2012–13) ===
Goian joined Serie B club Spezia Calcio on a season-long loan in August 2012. After moving to Spezia on loan, Goian vowed he would return to Rangers when his loan spell ended.

He made his debut for the club, four days later after signing for the club, in a 2–1 win over Vicenza. Since then, Goian became a regular in the first team. But on 17 November 2012 during a match with a 3–2 loss against Juve Stabia, Goian soon find himself in trouble after he pushed referee Maurizio Ciampi, which he was given a four match ban by the Disciplinary Committee of the Italian Professional League. Following his suspension, the club's sporting director Nelso Ricci described Goian as his "biggest disappointment" and in addition, Goian might leave the club to make a return to Rangers in January if his loan spell at the club has been terminated. After serving his four match ban and on 23 December 2012, Goian scored his first goal for the club with a header, as Spezia lose 3–2 against Padova. His goal led the manager Michele Serena stated that Goian will stay at the club and will not return to Rangers. His second goal came up on 6 April 2013, in a 2–1 win over Grosseto. However, Goian would lose his first team place at Spenzia towards the end of the season.

=== Asteras Tripoli ===
After his release from Rangers, Scottish reports claims that Goian was close to joining Greek Super League side Asteras Tripolis. The move was confirmed on 21 July 2013 on a two-year contract, where Goian was greeted by fans with a flower following his move. He made his debut with the club a month later at 18 August 2013 in a 3–3 home draw against PAS Giannina.

== International career ==
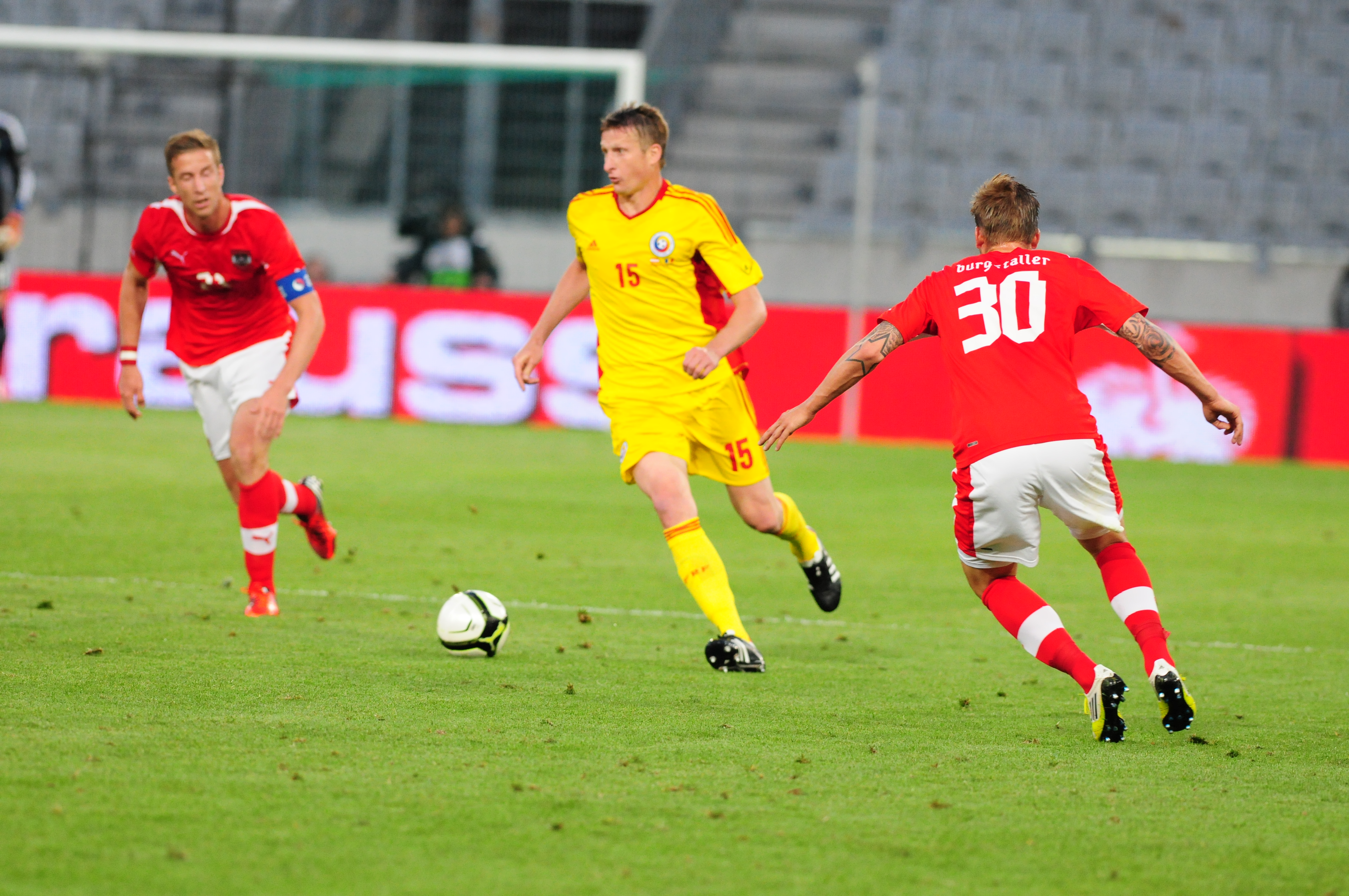
Goian in action against Austria on 5 June 2012

He was selected by Victor Piturca for the Romania national team on 16 November 2005, against Nigeria, thus making his first appearance for the national team.

=== Euro 2008 ===
On 9 June 2008, Goian made his Euro 2008 entrance against the World Cup 2006 finalist France in a Group C match in Zürich, Switzerland. He managed to stop strikers Nicolas Anelka and Karim Benzema, helping Romania win their first point with a goalless draw against France and also gaining his 20th cap.

The second match in Group C against Italy found Goian once again playing from the first minute on the pitch. Romania managed to draw 1–1 with Italy. After a foul committed in the 73rd minute he took the ball and threw it in the air. The referee gave him a yellow card and Goian will not play in the next game against the Netherlands.

== Personal life ==
On 23 October 2006, he became a father for the first time. His wife, Nadia, gave birth to a girl, who they named Maya Maria. On 7 January 2010 he also had a son who was named Nectarie Matei.

Dorin's brothers Gigi, Liviu and Lucian were also professional footballers, all of them having played in the Romanian top-division Liga I. He also has three sisters.

On 2 October 2020, Goian tested positive for COVID-19.

== Career statistics ==
=== Club ===
Appearances and goals by club, season and competition
Club	Season	League			National cup (Note: Includes Cupa României, Coppa Italia, Scottish Cup, Greek Cup)		Europe		Other		Total	
Club	Season	Division	Apps	Goals	Apps	Goals	Apps	Goals	Apps	Goals	Apps	Goals
Foresta II Fălticeni	1997–98	Divizia B	2	0	–		–		–		15	0
Foresta Suceava	1999–2000	Divizia B	2	0	0	0	–		–		2	0
Foresta Suceava	2000–01	Divizia A	15	0	0	0	–		–		15	0
Foresta Suceava	2001–02	Divizia B	11	2	0	0	–		–		11	2
Foresta Suceava	Total		28	2	0	0	0	0	0	0	28	7
Gloria Buzău (loan)	1999–2000	Divizia B	19	0	–		–		–		19	0
Ceahlăul Piatra Neamț	2001–02	Divizia A	9	0	0	0	–		–		9	0
Ceahlăul Piatra Neamț	2002–03	Divizia A	23	2	0	0	–		–		23	2
Ceahlăul Piatra Neamț	2003–04	Divizia A	13	0	1	0	2 (Note: Appearances in UEFA Intertoto Cup)	1	–		16	1
Ceahlăul Piatra Neamț	Total		45	2	1	0	2	1	0	0	48	3
FCM Bacău	2003–04	Divizia A	12	0	–		–		–		12	0
FCM Bacău	2004–05	Divizia A	14	2	2	0	–		–		16	2
FCM Bacău	Total		26	2	2	0	0	0	0	0	28	2
Steaua București	2004–05	Divizia A	4	0	–		0	0	–		4	0
Steaua București	2005–06	Divizia A	24	2	1	0	14 (Note: Appearances in UEFA Cup)	5	0	0	39	7
Steaua București	2006–07	Liga I	28	1	3	0	11 (Note: Nine appearances in UEFA Champions League, two appearances in UEFA Cup)	0	0	0	42	1
Steaua București	2007–08	Liga I	23	2	0	0	8 (Note: Appearances in UEFA Champions League)	3	–		31	5
Steaua București	2008–09	Liga I	27	1	0	0	7	1	–		34	2
Steaua București	2009–10	Liga I	1	0	–		3 (Note: Appearances in UEFA Europa League)	0	–		4	0
Steaua București	Total		107	6	4	0	43	9	0	0	154	15
Palermo	2009–10	Serie A	14	0	0	0	–		–		14	0
Palermo	2010–11	Serie A	16	1	3	0	3	0	–		22	1
Palermo	Total		30	1	3	0	3	0	0	0	36	1
Rangers	2011–12	Scottish Premier League	33	0	2	0	2	0	1 (Note: Appearances in Scottish League Cup)	1	38	1
Rangers	2012–13	Scottish Third Division	2	0	–		–		2 (Note: One appearance in Scottish League Cup, one appearance in Scottish Challenge Cup)	0	14	0
Rangers	Total		35	0	2	0	2	0	3	1	42	1
Spezia (loan)	2012–13	Serie B	26	2	–		–		–		26	2
Asteras Tripolis	2013–14	Super League Greece	29	1	2	0	1	0	–		32	1
Asteras Tripolis	2014–15	Super League Greece	27	1	3	1	9	1	–		39	3
Asteras Tripolis	2015–16	Super League Greece	13	0	2	0	3	0	–		18	0
Asteras Tripolis	Total		69	2	7	1	13	1	0	0	89	4
Career total			400	17	19	1	63	11	3	1	485	30

=== International ===
Appearances and goals by national team and year
National team	Year	Apps	Goals
Romania	2005	1	0
Romania	2006	5	1
Romania	2007	11	2
Romania	2008	8	2
Romania	2009	6	0
Romania	2010	4	0
Romania	2011	7	0
Romania	2012	7	0
Romania	2013	10	0
Romania	2014	1	0
Romania	2015	0	0
Total		60	5

Scores and results list Romania's goal tally first, score column indicates score after each Goian goal.

#	Date	Venue	Opponent	Score	Result	Competition
1	7 October 2006	Stadionul Steaua, Bucharest, Romania	Belarus	3–1	3–1	UEFA Euro 2008 qualifying
2	12 September 2007	RheinEnergieStadion, Cologne, Germany	Germany	1–0	1–3	Friendly
3	13 October 2007	Stadionul Farul, Constanța, Romania	Netherlands	1–0	1–0	UEFA Euro 2008 qualifying
4	11 October 2008	Stadionul Farul, Constanța, Romania	France	2–0	2–2	2010 FIFA World Cup qualification
5	19 November 2008	Stadionul Dinamo, Bucharest, Romania	Georgia	2–1	2–1	Friendly

== Managerial statistics ==
As of 28 November 2025

Managerial record by team and tenure
Team	From	To	Record							
Team	From	To	G	W	D	L	GF	GA	GD	Win %
Bucovina Rădăuți	13 November 2017	18 January 2020	66	39	9	18	114	49	+65	59.09
Foresta Suceava	13 June 2020	8 October 2020	5	2	0	3	7	7	+0	40.00
Foresta Suceava	15 July 2022	12 June 2023	34	19	9	6	54	25	+29	55.88
Cetatea Suceava	16 July 2025	29 November 2025	15	9	2	4	35	18	+17	60.00
Total			120	69	20	31	210	99	+111	57.50

== Honours ==
=== Player ===
Steaua București

- Divizia A: 2004–05, 2005–06
- Supercupa României: 2006

Palermo

- Coppa Italia runner-up: 2010–11

=== Coach ===
Foresta Suceava

- Liga III: 2022–23
