= Răzvan Creț =

Romanian footballer (born 2006)

Personal information
- Full name: Bogdan Răzvan Creț
- Date of birth: 29 May 2006 (age 20)
- Place of birth: Oradea, Romania
- Height: 1.76 m (5 ft 9 in)
- Position: Left-back

Team information
- Current team: Botoșani/Cetatea Suceava
- Number: 5/

Youth career
- –2022: LPS Bihorul Oradea

Senior career*
Years	Team	Apps	(Gls)
2022–2023	Lotus Băile Felix		
2023–	Botoșani	33	(0)
2024	→ CSM Focșani (loan)	0	(0)
2025	→ Minaur Baia Mare (loan)		
2026–	Cetatea Suceava	0	(0)

International career^{‡}
2026	Romania U20	1	(0)
- * Club domestic league appearances and goals as of 1 November 2026 ‡ National team caps and goals as of 27 March 2026

Bogdan Răzvan Creț (born 29 May 2006) is a Romanian professional footballer who plays as a left-back for Liga I club Botoșani and for Liga II club Cetatea Suceava.

== Honours ==
Minaur Baia Mare

- Liga III: 2024–25
