= 1948–49 Divizia C =

Third tier Romanian football league

Divizia C
- Season: 1948–49

The 1948–49 Divizia C was the 4th season of Liga III, the third tier of the Romanian football league system.

In February 1949, it was announced that Divizia C would be shut down, one of the causes being the unnecessary withdrawal of players from production before weekends, and another the scandals during some matches—issues that had persisted throughout the existence of Divizia C. The teams returned to the district championships.

== Team changes ==
=== To Divizia C ===
Relegated from Divizia B

- ~~CFR Arad~~
- Stăruința Satu Mare
- Electrica Timișoara
- BNR București
- CFR Târgoviște
- Sticla Târnăveni
- CFR Caracal
- Textila Buhuși
- CFR Simeria
- CFR Buzău
- CFR Iași
- UF Hunedoara
- Danubiana Roman
- Indagrara Arad
- CFR Turda
- CFR Brașov
- Tractorul Brașov
- Explosivii Făgăraș
- CFR Craiova
- Astra Română Poiana
- Metalosport Ferdinand
- Tisa Sighet
- Lugoj
- CFR Târgu Mureș
- Venus București
- ST București
- Doljul Craiova
- Dinamo Suceava

Promoted from Regional Championship

- Metalul Cugir
- Hârtia Piatra Neamț
- Minaur Zlatna
- Armata Cluj
- Foresta Reghin
- Credit Carbonifer Comănești
- Metalosport Galați
- CFR Pașcani
- Steaua Roșie Bacău
- ILSA Timișoara
- Izvorul Bocșa Montană
- Sighișoara
- Armata Iași
- Steagul Roșu Brașov
- CFR Carei
- Danubiana Giurgiu
- Armata București
- CFR Constanța
- CSM Râmnicu Vâlcea
- CAM Râmnicu Sărat
- Progresul Brăila
- SSC Arad
- CFR Dej

=== Renamed teams ===
UF Hunedoara was renamed as IMS Hunedoara.

Tisa Sighet was renamed as CFR Sighet.

Venus București was renamed as Venus UCB București.

Lugoj was renamed as Muncitorul Lugoj.

BNR București was renamed as Banca de Stat București.

=== Other changes ===
Gloria Arad and Franco-Româna Brăila were excluded from Divizia B.

FC Ripensia Timișoara and Electrica Timișoara merged, the first one being absorbed by the second.

== League tables ==
=== Seria I ===
Pos	Team	Pld	W	D	L	GF	GA	GD	Pts
1	Electrica Timișoara	13	9	3	1	28	10	+18	21
2	CFR Simeria	13	8	4	1	39	16	+23	20
3	IMS Hunedoara	13	8	2	3	21	12	+9	18
4	AMEF Arad	13	8	1	4	28	23	+5	17
5	CFR Caransebeș	13	6	3	4	21	19	+2	15
6	SSC Arad	13	5	4	4	28	15	+13	14
7	Armata Timișoara	13	5	4	4	29	22	+7	14
8	Doljul Craiova	13	4	3	6	19	27	−8	11
9	Muncitorul Lugoj	13	4	2	7	21	21	0	10
10	Metalosport Oțelul Roșu	13	4	2	7	21	23	−2	10
11	Indagrara Arad	13	2	6	5	13	20	−7	10
12	ILSA Timișoara	13	3	2	8	14	34	−20	8
13	Izvorul Bocșa Montană	13	2	4	7	18	27	−9	8
14	Metalul Cugir	13	2	2	9	11	42	−31	6

Source: romaniansoccer.ro
Rules for classification: 1) Points; 2) Goal difference; 3) Number of goals scored.

=== Seria II ===
Pos	Team	Pld	W	D	L	GF	GA	GD	Pts
1	CFR Târgu Mureș	12	8	3	1	41	7	+34	19
2	Stăruința Satu Mare	12	7	2	3	27	21	+6	16
3	Sighișoara	12	6	2	4	23	19	+4	14
4	CFR Carei	12	6	1	5	26	27	−1	13
5	Explosivi Făgăraș	12	5	3	4	30	21	+9	13
6	CFR Turda	12	5	2	5	34	25	+9	12
7	Topitorul Baia Mare	12	5	2	5	16	32	−16	12
8	Minaur Zlatna	12	5	1	6	17	26	−9	11
9	Sticla Târnăveni	12	4	3	5	24	24	0	11
10	Armata Cluj	12	5	1	6	29	21	+8	11
11	Foresta Reghin	12	4	2	6	27	23	+4	10
12	CFR Dej	12	5	0	7	16	49	−33	10
13	CFR Sighet	12	2	0	10	12	30	−18	4

Source: romaniansoccer.ro
Rules for classification: 1) Points; 2) Goal difference; 3) Number of goals scored.

=== Seria III ===
Pos	Team	Pld	W	D	L	GF	GA	GD	Pts
1	CFR Iași	13	11	1	1	31	9	+22	23
2	Textila Buhuși	13	8	1	4	28	22	+6	17
3	Danubiana Roman	13	7	2	4	25	12	+13	16
4	CFR Buzău	13	7	2	4	34	26	+8	16
5	Banca de Stat București	13	6	4	3	26	23	+3	16
6	Credit Carbonifer Comănești	13	7	2	4	26	21	+5	16
7	Progresul Brăila	13	6	2	5	23	24	−1	14
8	Metalosport Galați	13	6	2	5	23	15	+8	14
9	CAM Râmnicu Sărat	13	6	2	5	21	28	−7	14
10	Armata Iași	13	5	1	7	36	32	+4	11
11	Dinamo Suceava	13	3	5	5	21	23	−2	11
12	Hârtia Piatra Neamț	13	3	1	9	15	27	−12	7
13	CFR Pașcani	13	2	2	9	11	28	−17	6
14	Steaua Roșie Bacău	13	2	0	11	14	48	−34	4

Source: romaniansoccer.ro
Rules for classification: 1) Points; 2) Goal difference; 3) Number of goals scored.

=== Seria IV ===
Pos	Team	Pld	W	D	L	GF	GA	GD	Pts
1	CFR Târgoviște	12	7	4	1	24	14	+10	18
2	Danubiana Giurgiu	12	7	2	3	34	17	+17	16
3	Astra Română Poiana Câmpina	12	7	2	3	38	19	+19	16
4	Armata București	12	5	5	2	22	14	+8	15
5	CSM Râmnicu Vâlcea	12	6	2	4	20	21	−1	14
6	CFR Craiova	12	6	1	5	29	23	+6	13
7	CFR Constanța	13	4	5	4	20	26	−6	13
8	CFR Brașov	12	5	2	5	21	24	−3	12
9	Tractorul Brașov	12	3	4	5	13	21	−8	10
10	CFR Caracal	12	4	1	7	23	26	−3	9
11	Venus UCB București	12	3	3	6	21	33	−12	9
12	Steagul Roșu Brașov	12	2	3	7	21	29	−8	7
13	ST București	12	1	4	7	17	36	−19	6

Source: romaniansoccer.ro
Rules for classification: 1) Points; 2) Goal difference; 3) Number of goals scored.

== See also ==
- 1948–49 Divizia A
- 1948–49 Divizia B
- 1948–49 Cupa României
