= Ciprian Perju =

Romanian footballer

Personal information
- Full name: Ciprian Antonio Perju
- Date of birth: 18 March 1996 (age 30)
- Place of birth: Pogoanele, Romania
- Height: 1.88 m (6 ft 2 in)
- Position: Defender

Team information
- Current team: Cetatea Suceava
- Number: 23

Youth career
- –2011: Gloria Buzău
- 2011–2014: Gheorghe Hagi Academy

Senior career*
Years	Team	Apps	(Gls)
2014–2021	Viitorul Constanța	6	(0)
2015	→ FC Brașov (loan)	9	(0)
2016–2017	→ Academica Clinceni (loan)	29	(1)
2017–2019	→ Afumați (loan)	29	(0)
2019–2021	→ SCM Gloria Buzău (loan)	26	(1)
2021–2023	Unirea Slobozia	43	(3)
2023	→ FC Brașov (loan)	0	(0)
2023	CSM Alexandria	12	(1)
2024	CSM Focşani	6	(0)
2024–2025	Metalul Buzău	11	(1)
2025–	Cetatea Suceava	21	(1)
- * Club domestic league appearances and goals as of 31 October 2026

Ciprian Antonio Perju (born 18 March 1996) is a Romanian professional footballer who plays as a defender for Liga II club Cetatea Suceava.

== Honours ==
Cetatea Suceava

- Liga III: 2025–26
