= Areni Stadium =

Multi-purpose stadium in Suceava, Romania

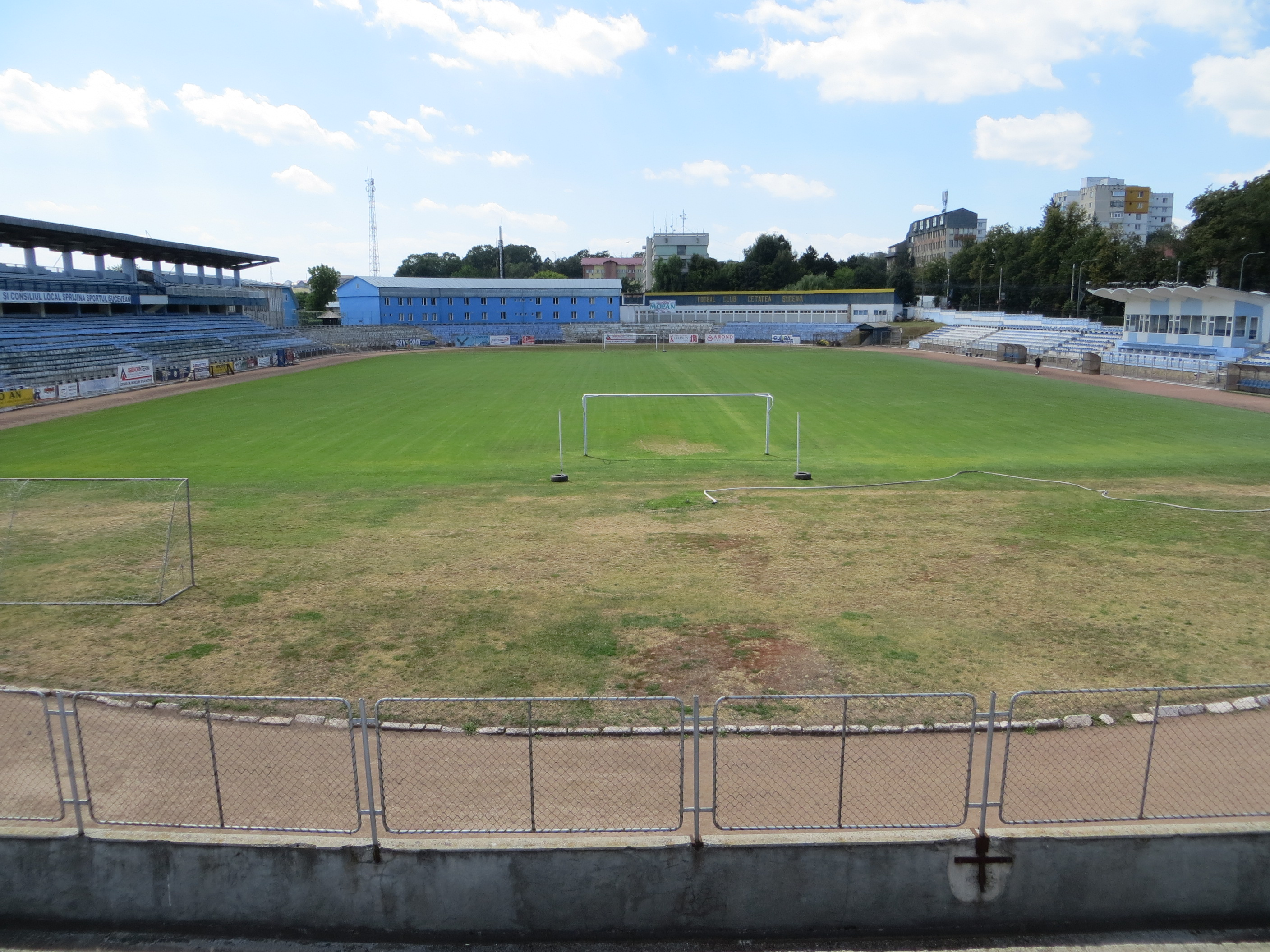
- The stadium in 2009
- Interactive map of Areni Stadium
- Address: Str. Bradului / Blvd. 1 Mai
- Location: Suceava, Romania
- Coordinates: 47°38′22.0″N 26°14′47.3″E
- Owner: Municipality of Suceava
- Operator: Cetatea Suceava
- Capacity: 7,000, restricted from 12,500
- Surface: grass

Construction
- Opened: 1963
- Renovated: 1976–1977, 1980–1982, 2002

Tenants
- Cetatea Suceava (1963–present); Bucovina Rugby (1963–present); Foresta Fălticeni (1997–2003); Sporting Suceava (2008–2014); Foresta Suceava (2008–2024)

The Areni Stadium (Romanian: Stadionul Areni) is a multi-purpose stadium in Suceava, the largest municipality and county seat town of Suceava County. It currently is the home ground of Cetatea Suceava. The stadium had a total capacity of 12,500 seats and was opened in 1963 as the Municipal Stadium. Additionally, the stadium was also renovated between the periods 1976–1977, 1980–1982, and 2002 respectively. After some seats were installed it holds 7,000 people.

== Gallery ==
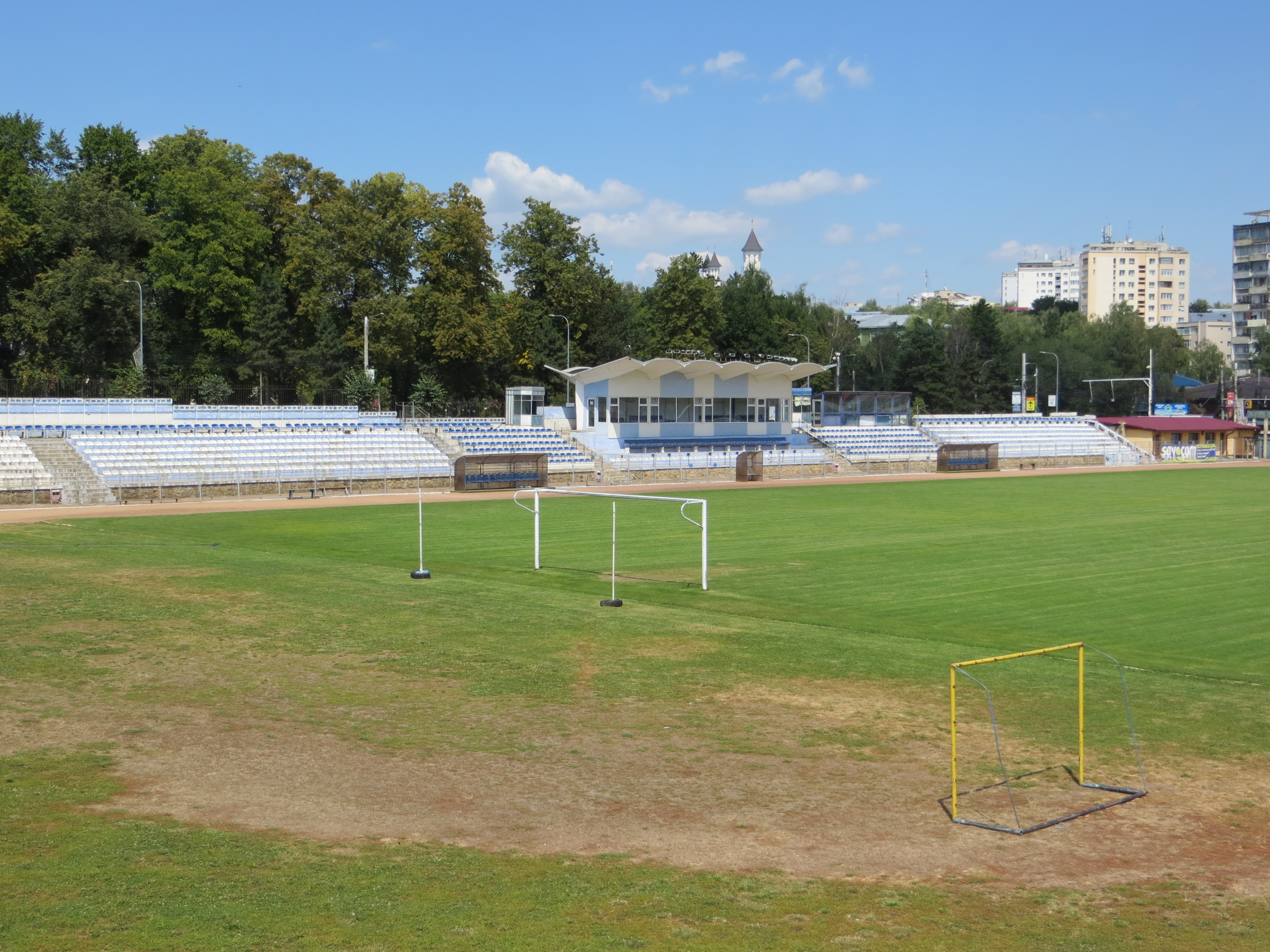
Main stand

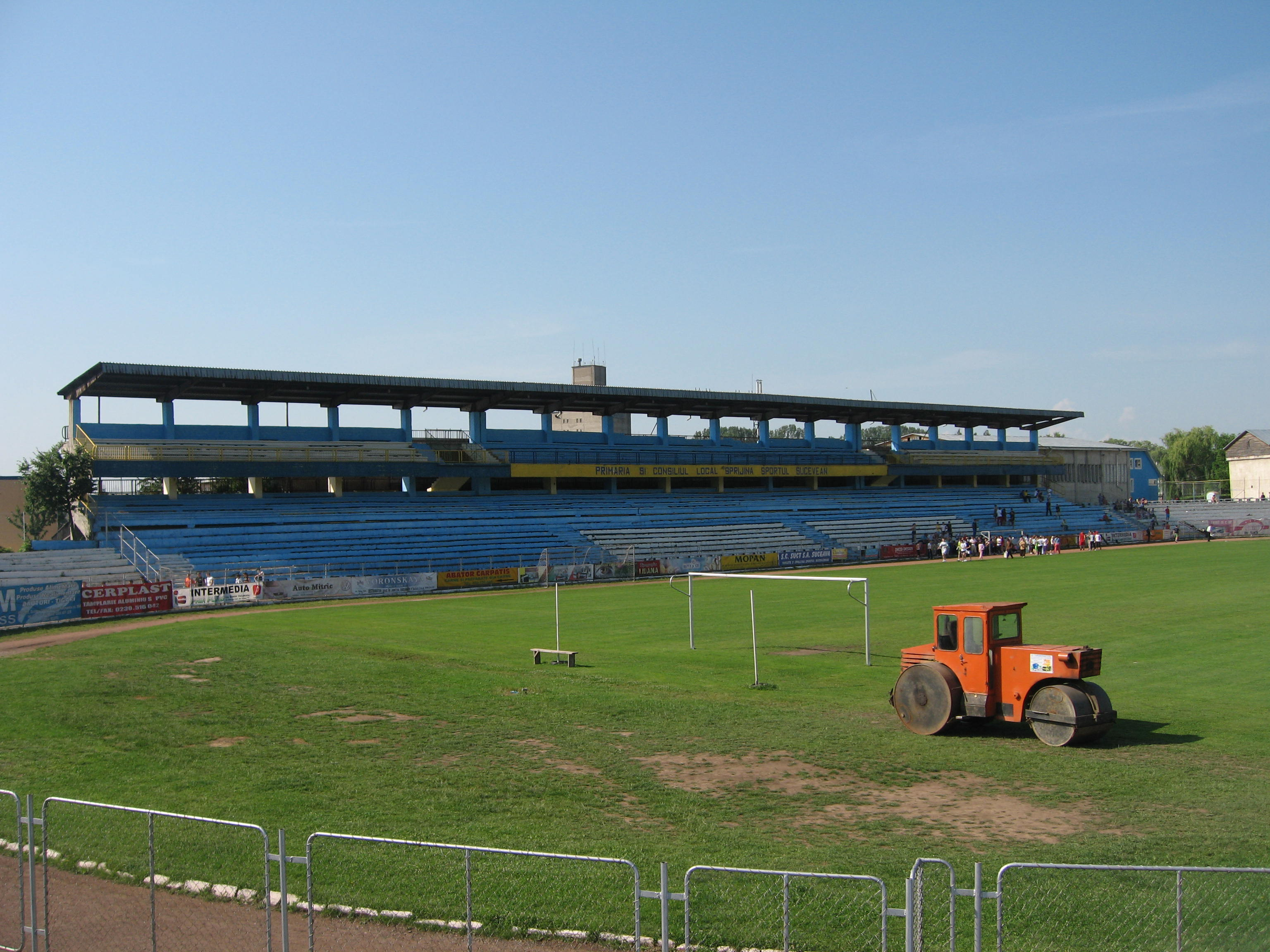
Second stand

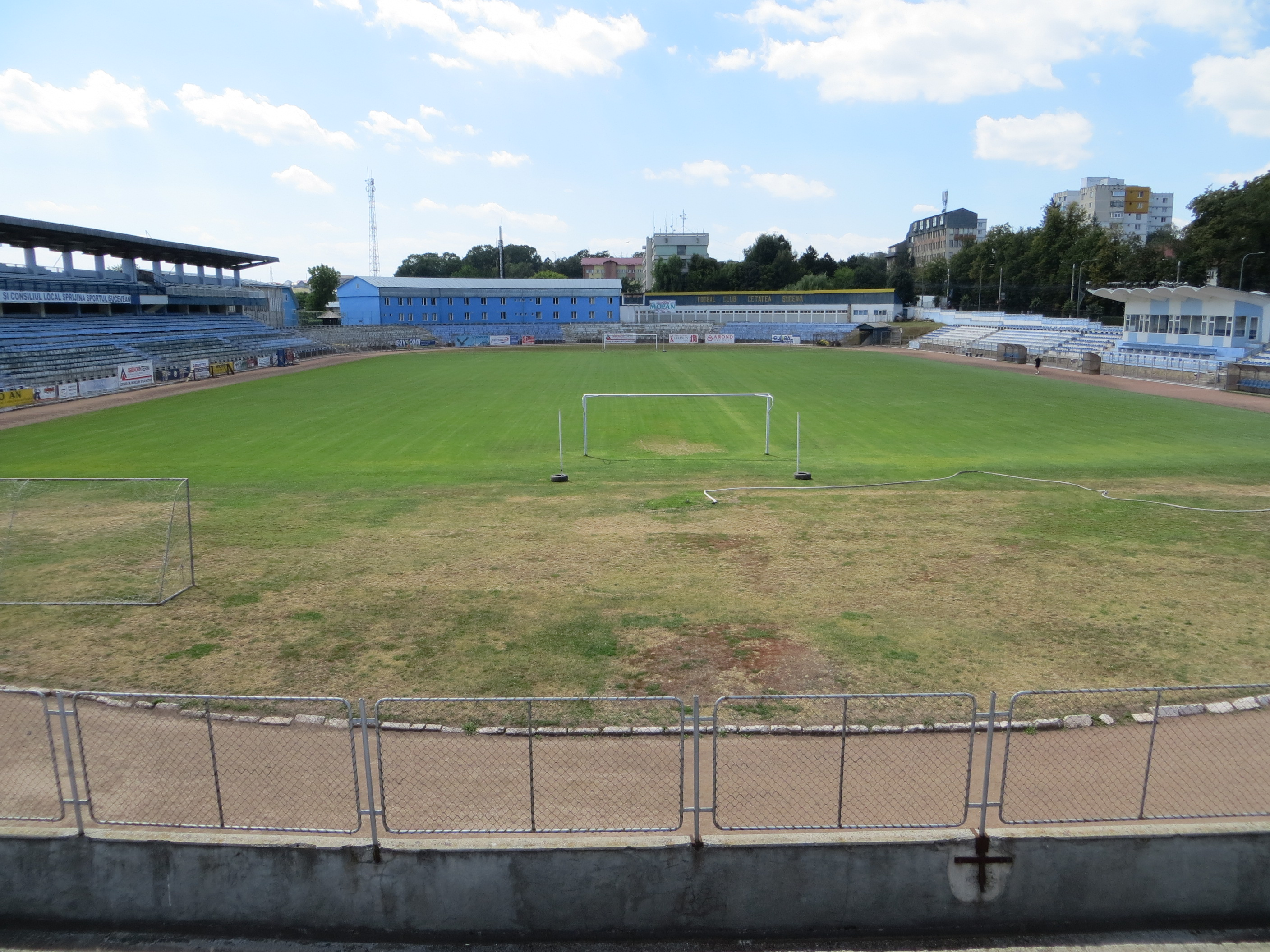
Stadium panorama

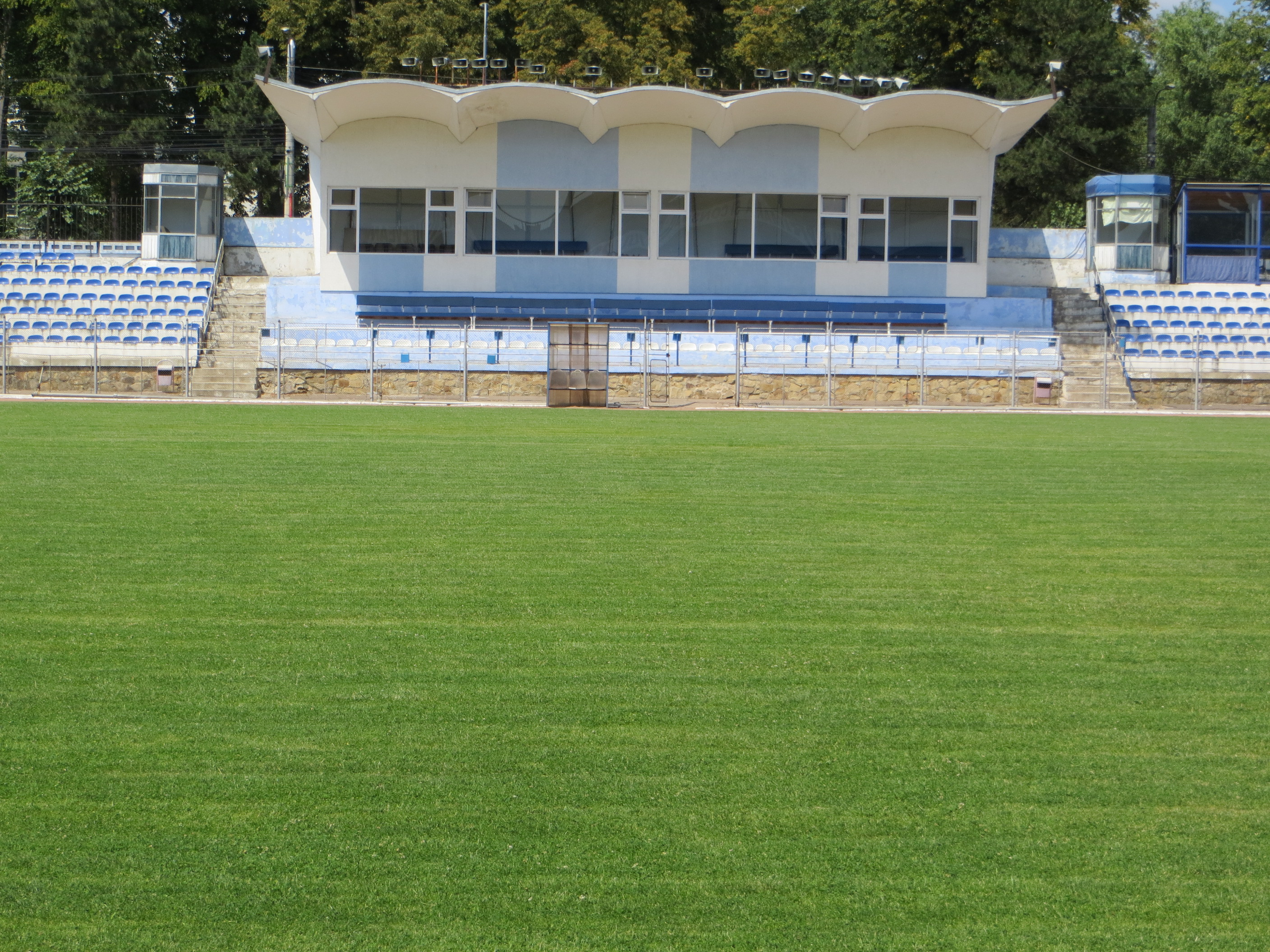
VIP zone

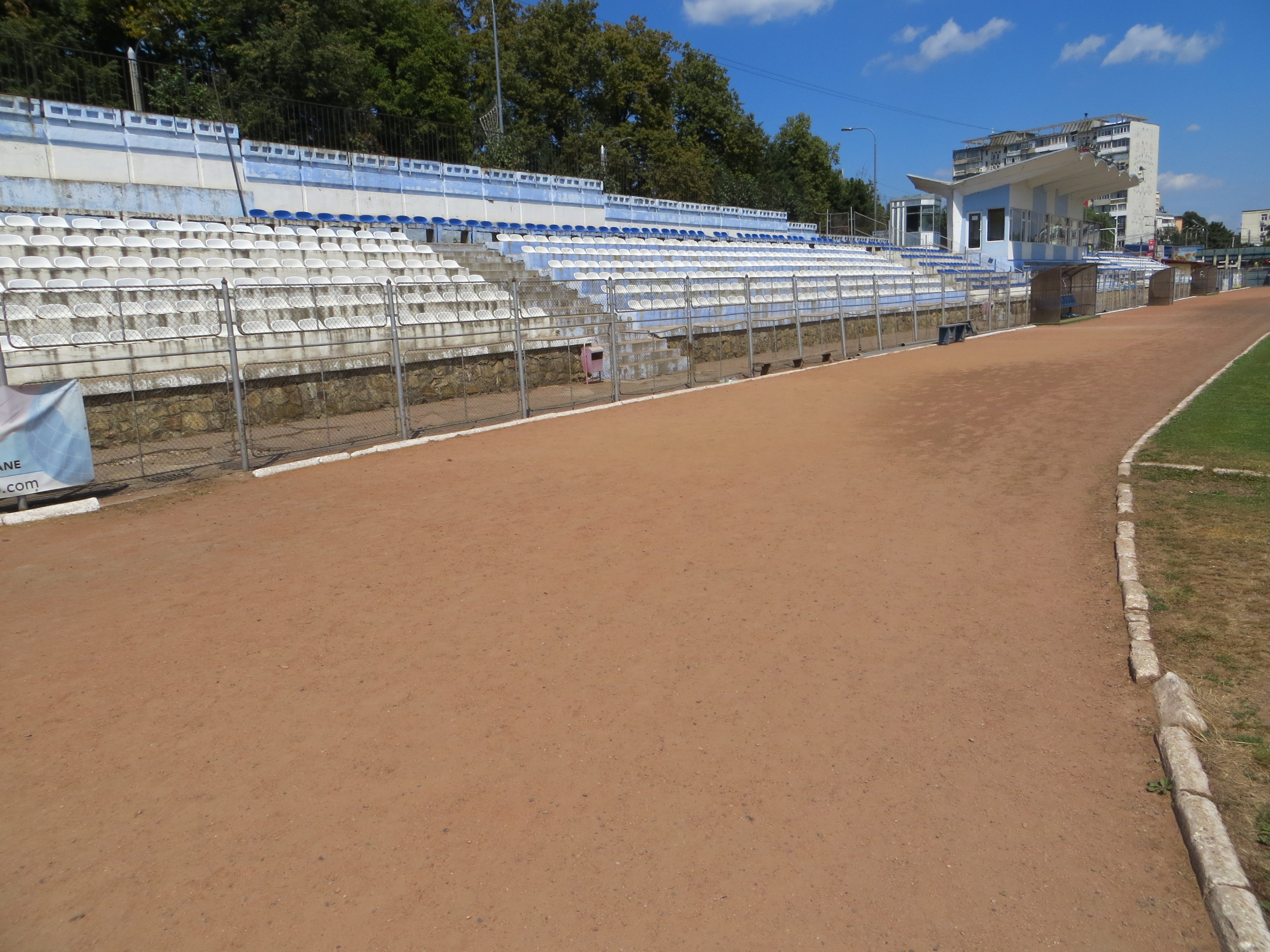
Running track

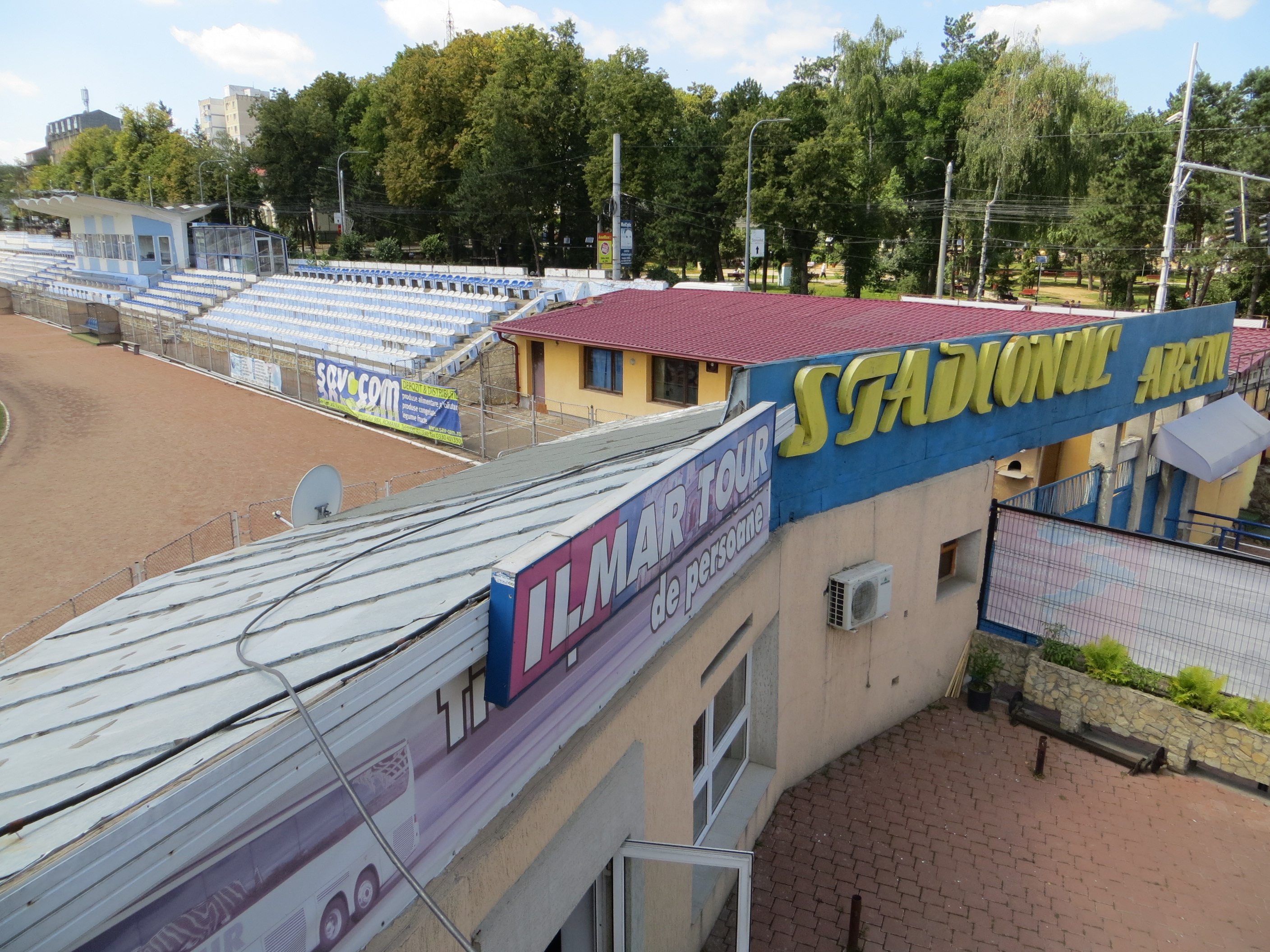
Stadium entry

== See also ==
- List of football stadiums in Romania
