= Ricardo Farcaș =

Romanian footballer

Personal information
- Full name: Ricardo Florin Farcaș
- Date of birth: 24 June 2000 (age 26)
- Place of birth: Oradea, Romania
- Height: 1.86 m (6 ft 1 in)
- Position: Centre back

Team information
- Current team: Cetatea Suceava
- Number: 16

Youth career
- –2014: Luceafărul Oradea
- 2014–2016: Arsenal Elite Academy Greece
- 2016–2018: Ajax
- 2018–2020: SPAL

Senior career*
| Years | Team | Apps | (Gls) |
| 2020–2023 | Siena | 47 | (1) |
| 2023–2025 | Bihor Oradea | 59 | (6) |
| 2025–2026 | Politehnica Iași | 26 | (1) |
| 2026– | Cetatea Suceava | 5 | (0) |

International career
| 2015–2016 | Romania U16 | 7 | (0) |
| 2016–2017 | Romania U17 | 4 | (0) |
| 2017–2018 | Romania U18 | 5 | (0) |
| 2021–2022 | Romania U21 | 6 | (0) |
- * Club domestic league appearances and goals as of 19 September 2026

Ricardo Florin Farcaș (born 24 June 2000) is a Romanian professional footballer who plays as a centre back for Liga II club Cetatea Suceava.

== Club career ==
=== Ajax Amsterdam ===
He was the first Romanian footballer who played for Ajax Academy.

=== S.P.A.L. ===
He trained with the first team of SPAL for a short time in 2019. On 27 January 2019 he sat on the bench in Seria A match against Parma FC.

=== Siena ===
Ricardo made his senior debut for Siena on 27 September 2020, in a 2–1 home victory over Ostiamare counting for the Serie D.

He made his Serie C debut on 29 August 2021 in a game against Vis Pesaro.

== Honours ==
Bihor Oradea

- Liga III: 2023–24
