= ACS Sporting Suceava =

Sporting Suceava
- Full name: Asociația Club Sportiv Sporting Suceava
- Nicknames: Alb-Verzii (The White and Greens)
- Short name: Sporting
- Founded: 2008
- Dissolved: 2014
- Ground: Areni
- Capacity: 12,500

Sporting Suceava was a professional football club from Romania, based in Suceava and founded in 2008.

== History ==
Sporting Suceava, with Ovidiu Ciobanu on the bench, promoted to the 3rd league after a successful campaign in 2010–11 season, "the white and greens" won the Liga IV – Suceava County and promotion play-off against the champion of Mureș County, FCM Târgu Mureș II, with 2–1 after extra time. The squad that achieved the promotion was composed of: Butnariu – Pantea, Murariu, Sevaciuc, Oniu, Bosancu, Apetri, Nicoară, Căinari, Guriță, Negru. Reserves: Gălan, Crișu, Gliga, Buziuc, Jalba, Avrămia, Cerlincă.

After three seasons in Liga III, the club was dissolved in the summer of 2014.

== Honours ==
Liga IV – Suceava County:

- Winners (1): 2010–11

== League history ==
Season	Tier	Division	Place	Cupa României
2013–14	3	Liga III (Seria I)	11th	
2012–13	3	Liga III (Seria I)	5th	
2011–12	3	Liga III (Seria I)	5th	
2010–11	4	Liga IV (SV)	1st (C, P)	
