= CS Bradul Putna =

Romanian football club

Bradul Putna
- Full name: Clubul Sportiv Bradul Putna
- Short name: Bradul
- Founded: 1950; 76 years ago as Avântul Putna; 2023; 3 years ago (refounded) as Bradul Putna
- Ground: Putna
- Capacity: 800
- Owner: Putna Commune
- Chairman: Manuel Costache
- Manager: Relu Buliga
- League: Liga III
- 2025–26: Liga IV, Suceava County, 1st (promoted via play-offs)

Clubul Sportiv Bradul Putna, commonly known as Bradul Putna, is a Romanian association football club based in Putna, Suceava County, currently playing in Liga III, the third tier of Romanian football.

Founded in the 1950s as Avântul Putna, the club subsequently competed under the names Energia Putna and Bradul Putna. In 2026, it achieved its first promotion to Liga III, after winning the Liga IV Suceava County title and the promotion play-offs.

== History ==
Football in Putna dates back to the 1950s, when the local team competed under the name Avântul Putna. It later became known as Energia Putna before adopting the name Bradul Putna. The team competed primarily in the fourth and fifth tiers of the Romanian football league system, in the Suceava regional and county competitions.

In the 2006–07 season, Bradul initially competed in Liga V Suceava but moved up to Liga IV during the winter break, taking the place of Luceafărul Bucovina Suceava, which had withdrawn, retaining its results and finishing in 7th place. Bradul finished 8th in 2007–08 and 6th in 2008–09, but was excluded in 2009 due to problems with its home ground.

Bradul resumed its activity in the 2010–11 season, finishing 2nd in Series I of Liga V Suceava County, and went on to win Series II the following season, finishing 18 points ahead of runners-up Avântul Grămești, earning promotion to Liga IV Suceava.

After finishing 4th in the 2012–13 campaign, Bradul won the Liga IV Suceava County title in the following season under head coach Ciprian Crețan and qualified for the promotion play-off to Liga III, where it lost 2–6 to Gloria Bistrița II, the Liga IV Bistrița-Năsăud County winners, in a match played on the secondary pitch of Ceahlăul Stadium in Piatra Neamț.

Bradul finished 8th in 2014–15 and 4th in 2015–16, but withdrew from Liga IV Suceava County during the winter break of the 2016–17 season and subsequently disbanded.

In 2023, the club was re-established at the initiative of the local authorities and enrolled in Liga IV Suceava County, with Dimitrie Bîru as head coach. He led the team to 4th place in the 2023–24 campaign and 3rd place in 2024–25. Sebastian Vicol was appointed head coach in the summer of 2025 and remained in charge until February 2026, when he was replaced by Ionuț Plămadă. Under Plămadă, Bradul won the Liga IV Suceava County title undefeated and secured promotion to Liga III by defeating Unirea Curtești, the Liga IV Botoșani County winners, 4–0 in both legs of the promotion play-off.

In August 2026, Relu Buliga was appointed head coach, as Ionuț Plămadă did not hold a UEFA B licence, although Plămadă remained the team's de facto head coach. Bradul also took part in the early stages of the Cupa României, defeating local rivals Bucovina Rădăuți 9–0 in the first qualifying round, before being eliminated 1–2 by USV Iași in the second round.

== Ground ==
Bradul plays its home matches at the Putna Stadium, which has a stand with a capacity of 800 seats. The stadium was built with funding from the National Investment Company, at a cost of €3 million, and was inaugurated on 7 September 2024, with a retirement match for Bradul former player and Romania international Mihai Roman.

== Honors ==
=== Leagues ===
Liga IV – Suceava County

- Winners (2): 2013–14, 2025–26

Liga V – Suceava County

- Winners (1): 2011–12

==== Cups ====
Cupa României – Suceava County

- Winners (1): 2025–26

== Current squad ==
As of 12 September 2026

Note: Flags indicate national team as defined under FIFA eligibility rules; some limited exceptions apply. Players may hold more than one non-FIFA nationality.

No.	Pos.	Nation	Player
—	GK	ROU	Ionuț Puha
—	DF	ROU	Mihai Macovei
—	MF	ROU	Tudor Alexa
—	FW	ROU	Ilie Ababei

No.	Pos.	Nation	Player
—	MF	ROU	Daniel Bostan (player-coach)
—	FW	ROU	Ionuț Plămadă (player-coach)

== Club officials ==
=== Board of officials ===
Role	Name
Owner	(Romania) Putna Commune
President	(Romania) Manuel Costache
Sporting director	(Romania) Mihăiță Székely
Club delegate	(Romania) Daniel Ionuț Bostan

- Source:Staff
- Last updated: 1 November 2026

=== Current technical staff ===
Role	Name
Head coach	(Romania) Relu Buliga
Fitness coach	(Romania) Ionuț Plamadă
Club doctor	(Romania) Dănuț Sorin Lavric (Romania) Mircea Ioan Horbaniuc
Physiotherapist	(Romania) Maria Adriana Plămadă-Vaidne

- Source:Staff
- Last updated: 1 November 2026

== Former managers ==
- (Romania) Dimitrie Bîru (2023–2025)
- (Romania) Sebastian Vicol (2025)
- (Romania) Ionuț Plămadă (2025–2026)
- (Romania) Relu Buliga (2026–)

== League and cup history ==
Season	Tier	League	Regular season	Play-off / Play-out	Notes	Cupa României
2025–26	4	Liga IV (SV)	1st (C)		Promoted	County phase - W
2024–25	4	Liga IV (SV)	4th			County phase - QF
2023–24	4	Liga IV (SV)	3rd			County phase - QF
