= CSM Cetatea Suceava =

Romanian football club

Cetatea Suceava
- Full name: Asociaţia Club Sportiv Municipal Cetatea 1932 Suceava
- Nicknames: Cavalerii Nordului (The Knights of the North); Alb-albaștrii (The White and Blues)
- Founded: 1932; 94 years ago as Cetatea Sucevei; 1957; 69 years ago as Progresul Suceava; 2004; 22 years ago as Cetatea Suceava; 2024; 2 years ago as Asociaţia Club Sportiv Municipal Cetatea 1932 Suceava
- Ground: Areni
- Capacity: 12,500 (7,000 seated)
- Owners: Marius Neagu; Suceava County Council; Suceava Municipality
- General manager: Marian Bordeianu
- Head coach: Petre Grigoraș
- League: Liga II
- 2025–26: Liga III, Series I Regular season: 2nd of 12; Play-off, Series I: 1st of 8 (promoted)
- Website: cetateasuceava.com
Home colours	Away colours

Asociaţia Club Sportiv Municipal Cetatea 1932 Suceava, commonly known as CSM Cetatea Suceava or Cetatea Suceava, is a Romanian professional football club based in Suceava, Suceava County, currently playing in Liga II, the second tier of Romanian football.

The club was originally established in 1932 under the name Cetatea Sucevei and, over time, was reorganized several times, using different names such as Chimia Suceava, CSM Suceava, or Cetatea Suceava, among others. Re-established in the summer of 2024, Cetatea achieved back-to-back promotions from Liga IV Suceava County to Liga II in 2025 and 2026.

== History ==
=== First years of football (1932–1949) ===
Cetatea Suceava was originally established in 1932 under the name Cetatea Sucevei, a name inspired by the Medieval Seat Fortress of Suceava. The first team from Suceava included players such as Lazăr Andrian, Fleghel, Ioanițchi, Cosmovici, N. Scobeniuc, Marcean, A. Scobeniuc, Hariga, Semenov, Cozma, Buliga, Curcă, Schwartz, Curcă, Borosan, Salpeter, and Radu Dan.

Cetatea Sucevei initially competed in the Eastern League Championship, a regional competition. Later, the team participated in the Eastern League of Divizia C, the newly formed third division of Romanian football. Initially, Divizia C's Eastern League was organised as a single group, but it was later expanded into two groups. During its first season in Divizia C, Cetatea Sucevei finished seventh and last in the Eastern League. In the 1937–38 season, the team finished second in Group II of the Eastern League, while also reaching the Round of 32 in the 1938–39 Cupa României.

In 1946, following World War II and the rise of the communist regime, Romanian football underwent drastic changes as the new Soviet model was implemented. This model required all sports associations to align themselves with trade unions or governmental institutions. As a result, Cetatea Sucevei was absorbed into CFR Ițcani, a team from a village that later became a neighbourhood of Suceava.

In the 1947–48 season, Suceava was represented in Divizia B by a team named Dinamo, which finished 16th in Series II and was relegated to Divizia C. There, it competed in the first half of the 1948–49 season, finishing 11th in Series III, before the competition was dissolved in February 1949 and the team returned to the regional championship.

=== From Spartac to CSM (1950–1997) ===
In 1950, another team was founded near the Prodaliment abattoir in the village of Burdujeni (now a neighbourhood of Suceava), under the name Spartac Burdujeni. In the 1953 season, Spartac Burdujeni won the Suceava Regional Championship and qualified for the promotion play-off for Divizia B. However, it finished fifth in Series I, held in Ploiești. Despite this, the second division was expanded the following season, and alongside the four group winners, an additional eight teams, including Spartac, were promoted.

In the 1954 Divizia B season, Spartac finished seventh in Series III and ranked fifth in the following season under the guidance of Gheorghe Hedeș. In the 1956 season, the team was renamed Flamura Roșie Burdujeni, finished 12th, level on points with Locomotiva Iași, and narrowly avoided relegation on goal difference.

In 1957, Flamura Roșie Burdujeni was officially relocated to Suceava and renamed Progresul Suceava. This moment was considered a rebirth of football in Suceava after more than a decade of inconsistency, during which the villages of Ițcani and Burdujeni had been better represented. Progresul played in Series II of Divizia B for the next two seasons, finishing 11th in 1957–58, before another rebranding followed on 12 April 1959, when the club became Victoria Suceava. The team finished 12th in the 1958–59 season.

For the next decade, the club experienced a lack of stability, reflected in its frequent name changes and fluctuating results. In 1959–60, under the name Dinamo Suceava, the team played in Series I of Divizia B, finishing fourth, followed by a sixth-place finish in the 1960–61 season. In 1961–62, the club dropped to 13th place and was relegated to the regional championship. Dinamo Suceava quickly returned to the national competitions after winning the Suceava Regional Championship in 1962–63, earning promotion to the newly re-established Divizia C, where it finished third in the East Series in 1963–64.

Renamed Viitorul Suceava in 1964, the team finished ninth in the 1964–65 season, before becoming Chimia Suceava following a takeover by the Combinatul de Celuloză și Hârtie (lit. 'Cellulose and Paper Mill Complex'). In 1965–66, Chimia won its Divizia C series and secured promotion to Divizia B under the guidance of Radu Gologan and Vasile Frânculescu, with a squad that included Sidac, Petcu, Moraru, Vicovan, Gumő, Cotipolis, Arhire, Roșu, Marosi, Borcău, Găinaru, Tudor, Nicolau, Asiminoaiei, Luca, and Belizna.

Chronology of names
Name	Period
Cetatea Sucevei	1932–1946
Progresul Suceava	1957–1959
Victoria Suceava	1959–1960
Dinamo Suceava	1960–1964
Viitorul Suceava	1964–1965
Chimia Suceava	1965–1972
CSM Suceava	1972–1993
Bucovina Suceava	1993–1997
Cetatea Suceava	2004–2010
Cetatea Suceava	2024–present

CSM Suceava was founded on 19 July 1972, incorporating football, track and field, rugby, and volleyball sections. Over the years, more sections were added and made available to its members, including archery, baseball, boxing, Greco-Roman wrestling, handball, ice hockey, rowing, speed skating, and swimming. The current structure includes archery, boxing, ice hockey, rugby, track and field, volleyball, and wrestling.

As one of the founding sections, the football team rose through the ranks of the Romanian league system before eventually gaining promotion to Divizia A at the end of the 1986–87 season. However, the competition proved too strong, and the team was relegated back to Divizia B, a league in which it played for the remainder of its existence. Before the 1993–94 season, the club was renamed Bucovina Suceava, after the historical region of Bukovina.

In the summer of 1997, Foresta Fălticeni was moved from Fălticeni to Suceava and renamed Foresta Suceava, thus bringing the CSM era to an end.

=== Foresta Fălticeni, a side story (1997–2003) ===
Foresta Fălticeni was founded in 1954 in Fălticeni, under the name Avântul Fălticeni. Foresta was the first team representing Divizia C to play in a Romanian Cup final, losing 0–6 to Steaua București at the end of the 1966–67 season. In 1997, the club was moved to Suceava after earning promotion to Divizia A for the first time in its history. The main reason for the move was the inadequate condition of Foresta's stadium in Fălticeni, which was small and had a cracked stand. Another reason for the move was that the city's main team, CSM Suceava, had failed to achieve any notable results during the previous decade.

=== Revival of Cetatea (2004–2010) ===
Cetatea Suceava logo used between 2004 and 2010.

Cetatea Suceava was refounded in the summer of 2004, when it absorbed Șoimii Suceava, as the phoenix club of Cetatea Sucevei, with the aim of continuing the city's football tradition following Foresta's dissolution. The club achieved its first major success in its inaugural season, finishing first in Divizia C and earning promotion to Divizia B. At the end of the 2005–06 season, Cetatea finished fifth, only to be relegated the following season after finishing 15th, just two points behind FCM Câmpina, the last team to avoid relegation. In the following 2007–08 Liga III season, Cetatea finished first with 76 points from 34 matches and was promoted back to the second division. The 2008–09 Liga II season proved difficult, with Cetatea avoiding relegation only because the bottom four teams withdrew from the championship.

Cetatea Suceava was excluded from the championship during the winter break of the 2009–10 season because of debts amounting to approximately 1 million €, including unpaid wages to players and coaches, unpaid taxes to the state, and debts to other private partners. All of the club's remaining matches were recorded as 3–0 defeats. In July 2010, the club re-entered competitions organised by the FRF and competed in the 2010–11 Cupa României. The club also sought to enter the 2010–11 Liga III season and become eligible for promotion to Liga II. On 2 August 2010, the club was registered with the FRF to compete in the 2010–11 Liga III season, but it was subsequently dissolved. It withdrew from the championship just a few days before the season began.

=== Rapid CFR and the nostalgia of Foresta (2010–2024) ===
After the dissolution of Cetatea Suceava in 2010, local football gradually reorganised around Rapid CFR Suceava, which became the main club representing the city in national competitions and achieved promotion to the second division at the end of the 2011–12 season. In the summer of 2016, the club changed its name from Rapid CFR Suceava to Foresta Suceava, a name associated with some of the most important achievements in Suceava football, obtained by Foresta Fălticeni, although there was no direct connection between the two clubs. The new Foresta competed in Liga II and Liga III until 2024, when it was dissolved due to financial and political problems.

=== No more Foresta, Cetatea is back (2024–present) ===
After the dissolution of the second Foresta Suceava, a group of former players, together with the local authorities and several local business figures, re-established Cetatea Suceava. With the support of the local authorities, the new Cetatea was integrated into the activities of CSM (Municipal Sports Club), a multi-sports club that had also owned the former CSM Suceava football team, effectively bringing the two historical teams together under the name CSM Cetatea Suceava. The team uses the traditional white and blue colours and plays its home matches at the city's historic Areni Stadium.

Cetatea won promotion to Liga III at the first attempt under Ionuț Plămadă, winning the 2024–25 season of Liga IV – Suceava County and the promotion play-off against AS Bârsănești, the Bacău County winner (6–0 at home and 2–1 away). The squad comprised, among others, Cuciureanu, Grosu, Sumanariu, Vițu, David, Nițu, Cerlincă, Chelari, M. Ilie, Ciobanu, Filip, Codău, Buceac, Rotundu, Netbai and Smoco.

After promotion, Dorin Goian was appointed head coach for the 2025–26 campaign, and the squad was significantly strengthened ahead of the new season through several notable signings, including Tucaliuc, Gorovei, Balgiu, Perju, and Zaharia. Goian resigned after a heavy 0–3 defeat at Bacău in the fifteenth round and was replaced by Petre Grigoraș, who further reinforced the team during the winter break with the arrivals of Ciobanu, Dănăilă, Frunză, Vlad, G. Răducan, and Ferhaoui. Under Grigoraș, Cetatea finished second in Series I of the regular season, behind local rivals Șoimii Gura Humorului, before overtaking them during a closely contested play-off round, winning the series and securing promotion to Liga II. The squad also included Bai, Chelari, Petraru, Sumanariu, M. Ilie, Drăghiceanu, Cerlincă, and Codreanu.

== Ground ==
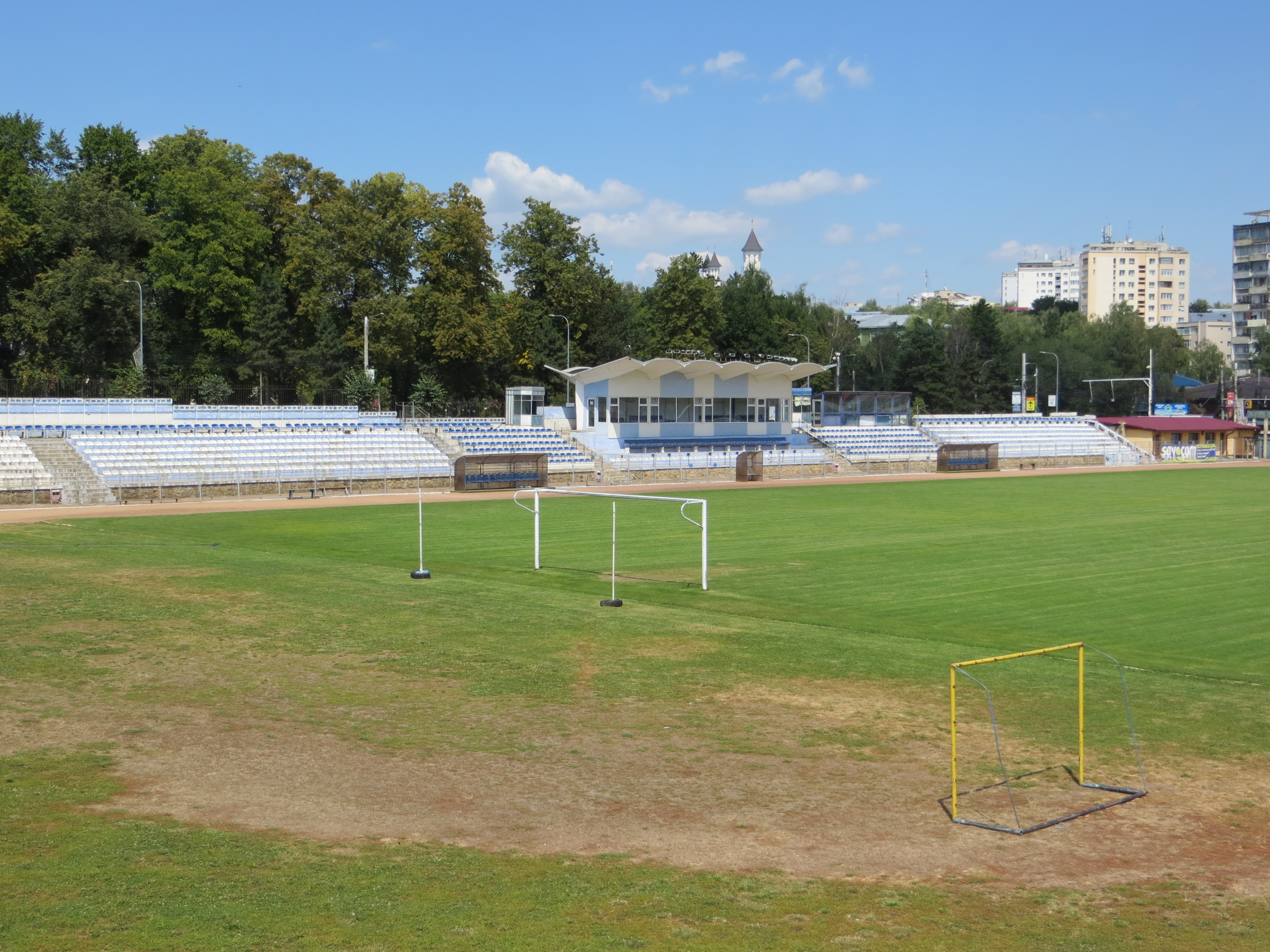
Main Stand of the Areni stadium. The stadium is located in downtown Suceava.

Cetatea Suceava plays its home matches on the Areni Stadium. The stadium has a total capacity of 12,500 seats (but is restricted to 7,000 seats due to safety measures) and was opened in 1963 under the name of Municipal Stadium. Additionally, the stadium was also renovated between the periods 1976–1977, 1980–1982 and 2002 respectively. It is currently ranked 31st in the all time ranking table of stadiums from Romania.

== Honours ==
Liga II

- Winners (1): 1986–87

Liga III:

- Winners (6): 1965–66, 1970–71, 1972–73, 2004–05, 2007–08, 2025–26
- Runners-up (1): 1971–72

Liga IV – Suceava County

- Winners (1): 2024–25

== Players ==
=== First team squad ===
As of 29 October 2026

Note: Flags indicate national team as defined under FIFA eligibility rules; some limited exceptions apply. Players may hold more than one non-FIFA nationality.

No.	Pos.	Nation	Player
1	GK	ROU	Alexandru Micu
3	DF	ROU	Vlăduț Cimbru
4	DF	ROU	Stejărel Vișinar
6	DF	ROU	Matei Manolache
7	MF	ROU	Andrei Cerlincă (Captain)
9	FW	UKR	Vadym Kyrychenko (on loan from Dinamo București)
10	MF	ROU	Marian Ilie (vice-captain)
11	FW	ROU	Alexandru Aftanache
13	GK	ROU	Alin Ciobanu (on loan from Botoșani)
14	MF	ROU	Mario Bai
15	FW	ROU	Gabriel Răducan
16	DF	ROU	Ricardo Farcaș
17	FW	UGA	Mahadi Kayondo
18	FW	ROU	Bogdan Grosu

No.	Pos.	Nation	Player
20	MF	ROU	Cosmin Tucaliuc
21	MF	ROU	Vlad Ilie
23	DF	ROU	Ciprian Perju
27	FW	ROU	Cătălin Golofca
29	DF	ROU	Alin Burdeț
30	FW	ROU	Denis Bujor
33	MF	ROU	Gabriel David (on loan from Botoșani)
70	FW	ROU	Aleksandru Longher
75	GK	ROU	Alexandru Dohotariu
77	DF	ROU	Andrei Mihai (on loan from Unirea Braniștea)
80	MF	ROU	Lóránd Fülöp
94	FW	FRA	Stéphane Ferhaoui
98	MF	ROU	Vlad Murariu
99	MF	ROU	Ruben Sumanariu (3rd captain)

=== Dual registration ===
Note: Flags indicate national team as defined under FIFA eligibility rules; some limited exceptions apply. Players may hold more than one non-FIFA nationality.

No.	Pos.	Nation	Player
8	MF	ROU	Denis Ștefan (from Botoșani)
—	DF	ROU	Răzvan Creț (from Botoșani)
—	DF	ROU	Alexandru Suchianu (from Botoșani)

No.	Pos.	Nation	Player
—	FW	ROU	George Șorodoc (from Botoșani)
—	FW	ROU	Teodor Afilipoaie (from Botoșani)

=== Out on loan ===
Note: Flags indicate national team as defined under FIFA eligibility rules; some limited exceptions apply. Players may hold more than one non-FIFA nationality.

No.	Pos.	Nation	Player
—	DF	ROU	Ștefan Petraru (to Bradul Putna until 30 June 2027)

== Club officials ==
=== Board of directors ===
Role	Name
Owner	(Romania) Marius Neagu (Romania) Suceava County Council (Romania) Suceava Municipality
President	(Romania) Marius Neagu
Vice-presidents	(Romania) Mihai Diaconiță (Romania) Cornel Lucescu
Treasurer	(Romania) Liviu Grigorean
General manager	(Romania) Marian Bordeianu
Sporting director	(Romania) Răzvan Zetu
Head of youth development	(Romania) Daniel Bălan
Delegate	(Romania) Andrei Ițco
Press officer	(Romania) Adrian Negru

=== Current technical staff ===
Role	Name
Head coach	(Romania) Petre Grigoraș
Assistant coaches	(Romania) Paul Boșâncu (Romania) Florin Cristescu
Goalkeeping coach	(Romania) Paul Luca
Fitness coach	(Romania) Ionuț Plămadă
Kinetotherapist	(Romania) Maria Vaidner

== League history ==
Season	Tier	Division	Place	Notes	Cupa României
2026–27	2	Liga II (Seria I)	TBD		Third Round
2025–26	3	Liga III (Seria I)	1st (C)	Promoted	
2024–25	4	Liga IV (SV)	1st (C)	Promoted	
2011–24		Not active			
2010–11	3	Liga III (Serie I)	15th	Withdrew	
2009–10	2	Liga II (Serie I)	18th	Relegated	
2008–09	2	Liga II (Serie I)	14th		
2007–08	3	Liga III (Serie I)	1st (C)	Promoted	
2006–07	2	Liga II (Serie I)	15th	Relegated	
2005–06	2	Divizia B (Serie I)	5th		Round of 16
2004–05	3	Divizia C (Serie I)	1st (C)	Promoted	
2002–03	2	Divizia B (Serie I)	14th	Withdrew	
1996–97	2	Divizia B (Serie I)	12th	Merge w/ Foresta	
1995–96	2	Divizia B (Serie II)	6th		
1994–95	2	Divizia B (Serie I)	5th		
1993–94	2	Divizia B (Serie I)	15th		
1992–93	2	Divizia B (Serie I)	11th		
1991–92	2	Divizia B (Serie III)	6th		
1990–91	2	Divizia B (Serie I)	10th		
1989–90	2	Divizia B (Serie I)	7th		
1988–89	2	Divizia B (Serie I)	6th		
1987–88	1	Divizia A	18th	Relegated	Round of 32
1986–87	2	Divizia B (Serie I)	1st (C)	Promoted	
1985–86	2	Divizia B (Serie I)	5th		
1984–85	2	Divizia B (Serie I)	6th		

Season	Tier	Division	Place	Notes	Cupa României
1983–84	2	Divizia B (Serie I)	6th		
1982–83	2	Divizia B (Serie I)	4th		
1981–82	2	Divizia B (Serie I)	4th		Round of 32
1980–81	2	Divizia B (Serie I)	6th		
1979–80	2	Divizia B (Serie I)	7th		
1978–79	2	Divizia B (Serie I)	3rd		
1977–78	2	Divizia B (Serie I)	4th		
1976–77	2	Divizia B (Serie I)	6th		
1975–76	2	Divizia B (Serie I)	6th		
1974–75	2	Divizia B (Serie I)	13th		
1973–74	2	Divizia B (Serie I)	5th		
1972–73	3	Divizia C (Serie I)	1st (C)	Promoted	
1971–72	3	Divizia C (Serie I)	2nd		
1970–71	3	Divizia C (Serie I)	1st (C)		
1969–70	2	Divizia B (Serie I)	15th	Relegated	
1968–69	2	Divizia B (Serie I)	10th		Semi-finals
1967–68	2	Divizia B (Serie I)	10th		Round of 16
1966–67	2	Divizia B (Serie I)	3rd		Round of 16
1965–66	3	Divizia C (East Series)	1st (C)	Promoted	
1964–65	3	Divizia C (East Series)	9th		
1963–64	3	Divizia C (East Series)	3rd		
1948–49	3	Divizia C (Seria III)	11th		
1938–39	4	District	-		Round of 32
1937–38	3	Divizia C (East League II)	2nd		
1936–37	3	Divizia C (East League)	7th		

== Notable former players ==
The footballers enlisted below have had international cap(s) for their respective countries at junior and/or senior level or/and have over 50 apps for Cetatea Suceava.

- (Romania) Dorel Bernard
- (Romania) Mugur Bolohan
- (Romania) Dorin Goian
- (Romania) Lucian Goian
- (Romania) Mihai Guriță
- (Romania) Gheorghe Mulțescu
- (Romania) Dumitru Nicolae
- (Romania) Marius Onciu
- (Romania) Dănuț Perjă
- (Romania) Doru Popadiuc
- (Romania) Mihai Roman
- (Romania) Tiberiu Serediuc

== Former managers ==
- (Romania) Vasile Frânculescu (1965–1966)
- (Romania) Valeriu Neagu (1966–1969)
- (Romania) Sebastian Taciuc (1972)
- (Romania) Petre Moldoveanu (1972–1973)
- (Romania) Constantin Rădulescu (1980–1982)
- (Romania) Robert Cosmoc (1986–1987)
- (Romania) Vasile Simionaș (1987–1988)
- (Romania) Marian Pană (2007–2008)
- (Romania) Dorin Goian (2025)
- (Romania) Petre Grigoraș (2026–)
