= Liga IV Suceava =

Fourth tier Romanian football league

- Founded: 1968
- Country: Romania
- Level on pyramid: 4
- Promotion to: Liga III
- Relegation to: Liga V Suceava
- Domestic cup: Cupa României – County phase
- Current champions: Bradul Putna (2nd title) (2025–26)
- Most championships: Bucovina Rădăuți (5 titles)
- Website: frf-ajf.ro/suceava
- Current: 2025–26 Liga IV Suceava

Liga IV Suceava (known as Liga Inter Conti for sponsorship reasons) is one of the regional football divisions of Liga IV, the fourth tier of the Romanian football league system, for clubs based in Suceava County, and is organized by AJF Suceava – Asociația Județeană de Fotbal (lit. 'County Football Association').

It is contested by a variable number of teams, depending on the number of teams relegated from Liga III, the number of teams promoted from Liga V Suceava, and the teams that withdraw or enter the competition. The winner may or may not be promoted to Liga III, depending on the result of a promotion play-off contested against the winner of a neighboring county series.

== History ==
In 1968, following the new administrative and territorial reorganization of the country, each county established its own football championship, integrating teams from the former regional championships as well as those that had previously competed in town and raion-level competitions. The newly formed Suceava County Championship was placed under the authority of the Consiliul Județean pentru Educație Fizică și Sport (lit. 'County Council for Physical Education and Sports') in Suceava County.

Since then, the structure and organization of Suceava’s main county competition, like those of other county championships, have undergone several changes. Between 1968 and 1992, the main county competition was known as the Campionatul Județean (County Championship). Starting in October 1991, the competition was organized by the AJF Suceava – Asociația Județeană de Fotbal (lit. 'County Football Association'). It was renamed Divizia C – Faza Județeană (lit. 'County phase') between 1992 and 1997, followed by Divizia D from 1997, and since 2006 it has been known as Liga IV, while from the 2015–16 season it was named Liga Inter Conti for sponsorship reasons.

== Promotion ==
The champions of each county association play against one another in a play-off to earn promotion to Liga III. Geographical criteria are taken into consideration when the play-offs are drawn. In total, there are 41 county champions plus the Bucharest municipal champion.

== List of champions ==
=== Suceava Regional Championship ===
Ed.	Season	Winners
1	1951	Dinamo Fălticeni
2	1952	Știința Câmpulung Moldovenesc
3	1953	Spartac Burdujeni
4	1954	Avântul Fălticeni
5	1955	Dinamo Dorohoi
6	1956	Textila Botoșani
7	1957–58	Minerul Câmpulung Moldovenesc
8	1958–59	Minerul Vatra Dornei
9	1959–60	Unirea Botoșani
10	1960–61	ASM Rădăuți
11	1961–62	Unirea Botoșani
12	1962–63	Dinamo Suceava
13	1963–64	Metalul Rădăuți
14	1964–65	Minobrad Vatra Dornei
15	1965–66	Textila Botoșani
16	1966–67	Minerul Fundu Moldovei
17	1967–68	Minerul Gura Humorului

=== Suceava County Championship ===
Ed.	Season	Winners
County Championship
1	1968–69	Bradul Chimia Vama
2	1969–70	Avântul Rădăuți
3	1970–71	Avântul Frasin
4	1971–72	Străduința Suceava
5	1972–73	Metalul Rădăuți
6	1973–74	Foresta Moldovița
7	1974–75	Progresul Fălticeni
8	1975–76	Sportul Muncitoresc Suceava
9	1976–77	Zimbrul Suceava
10	1977–78	Avântul Gălănești
11	1978–79	Unirea Siret
12	1979–80	Unirea Siret
13	1980–81	CFR Suceava
14	1981–82	Zimbrul Suceava
15	1982–83	Avântul Gălănești
16	1983–84	Viitorul Câmpulung Moldovenesc
17	1984–85	Filatura Fălticeni
18	1985–86	Unirea Emil Bodnăraș
19	1986–87	Filatura Fălticeni
20	1987–88	Rapid Stimas Suceava
21	1988–89	Minerul Crucea
22	1989–90	Unirea Emil Bodnăraș
23	1990–91	Minerul Crucea
24	1991–92	Bucovina AMG Suceava
Divizia C – County phase
25	1992–93	Minerul Gura Humorului
26	1993–94	Steaua Minerul Vatra Dornei
27	1994–95	Zimbrul Siret
28	1995–96	ASA Câmpulung Moldovenesc
29	1996–97	Bucovina Rădăuți
Divizia D
30	1997–98	Unirea Milișăuți
31	1998–99	Șomuzul Preutești
32	1999–00	Zimbrul Siret
33	2000–01	Bucovina Rădăuți
34	2001–02	Filatura Fălticeni
35	2002–03	Șoimii Suceava
36	2003–04	Dorna Vatra Dornei
37	2004–05	Viitorul Liteni
38	2005–06	Juventus Fălticeni

Ed.	Season	Winners
Liga IV
39	2006–07	Rarăul Câmpulung Moldovenesc
40	2007–08	Rapid CFR Suceava
41	2008–09	Gura Humorului
42	2009–10	Foresta Mălini
43	2010–11	Sporting Suceava
44	2011–12	Bucovina Frătăuții Noi
45	2012–13	Pojorâta
46	2013–14	Bradul Putna
47	2014–15	Bucovina Pojorâta II
48	2015–16	Șomuz Fălticeni
49	2016–17	Bucovina Rădăuți
50	2017–18	Șomuz Fălticeni
51	2018–19	Viitorul Liteni
52	2019–20	Siretul Dolhasca
53	2020–21	Viitorul Liteni
54	2021–22	Juniorul Suceava
55	2022–23	Viitorul Liteni
56	2023–24	Șoimii Gura Humorului
57	2024–25	Cetatea Suceava
58	2025–26	Bradul Putna

== See also ==
=== Main Leagues ===
- Liga I
- Liga II
- Liga III
- Liga IV

=== County Leagues (Liga IV series) ===
North–East

- Liga IV Bacău
- Liga IV Botoșani
- Liga IV Iași
- Liga IV Neamț
- Liga IV Suceava
- Liga IV Vaslui

North–West

- Liga IV Bihor
- Liga IV Bistrița-Năsăud
- Liga IV Cluj
- Liga IV Maramureș
- Liga IV Satu Mare
- Liga IV Sălaj

Center

- Liga IV Alba
- Liga IV Brașov
- Liga IV Covasna
- Liga IV Harghita
- Liga IV Mureș
- Liga IV Sibiu

West

- Liga IV Arad
- Liga IV Caraș-Severin
- Liga IV Gorj
- Liga IV Hunedoara
- Liga IV Mehedinți
- Liga IV Timiș

South–West

- Liga IV Argeș
- Liga IV Dâmbovița
- Liga IV Dolj
- Liga IV Olt
- Liga IV Teleorman
- Liga IV Vâlcea

South

- Liga IV Bucharest
- Liga IV Călărași
- Liga IV Giurgiu
- Liga IV Ialomița
- Liga IV Ilfov
- Liga IV Prahova

South–East

- Liga IV Brăila
- Liga IV Buzău
- Liga IV Constanța
- Liga IV Galați
- Liga IV Tulcea
- Liga IV Vrancea
