= ACS Foresta Suceava =

Association football club in Romania

Foresta Suceava
- Full name: Asociația Club Sportiv; Foresta Suceava
- Nicknames: Galben-Verzii (The Yellow and Greens); Pădurarii (The Rangers)
- Short name: Foresta
- Founded: 1946 (as CFR Ițcani)
- Dissolved: 2024
- Ground: Areni
- Capacity: 12,500 (7,000 seated)
Home colours	Away colours

Asociația Club Sportiv Foresta Suceava, commonly known as Foresta Suceava or simply as Foresta, was a professional football club from Romania, based in Suceava, Suceava County and founded in 1946 as Locomotiva Ițcani. Previously, the club changed its name to A.S. C.F.R. Ițcani as well. At the end of the 2017–2018 season finished 18th out of 20 teams and were relegated to the third league. They have last played in Liga III, Seria I, withdrawing on March 5, 2024, because of financial problems and unpaid debts.

== History ==
Former logo, as Rapid CFR Suceava.

Foresta Suceava was founded as Rapid CFR Suceava to continue the football tradition in the city of Suceava after the dissolution of FC Cetatea Suceava, CSM Suceava (Bucovina Suceava) and NC Foresta Suceava. In the 2011–2012 season the club managed to win Liga III and as such to gain promotion to Liga II. Thus, since the 2011–2012 season, Rapid CFR Suceava has played in Liga II, the second tier of the Romanian football system.

Rapid started the 2014–2015 Liga II season with good results: 3 wins and 2 draws. One result was the home match against Săgeata Năvodari, a club which had previously played in Liga I for the very first time in its history during the 2013–2014 season, when Rapid fell behind twice but managed to equalise each time. Mircea Negru and Marius Matei managed to score the goals for Rapid in that respective match. In the 5th fixture Rapid encountered CS Balotești. Rapid were losing 1–0 until the 88th minute, but won with two goals scored by Cătălin Golofca and Sascha Marinkovic. Along with this win, Rapid reached second place in Seria I of Liga II with 11 points after 5 matches.

In the 2014–2015 season the club additionally managed to qualify for the Round of 16 of the domestic cup competition Cupa României following a 1–0 win over Liga I side Gaz Metan Mediaș in the Round of 32 on September 23, 2014. After the Round of 32, Rapid Suceava alongside Dacia Mioveni were the only two football clubs from the second division to qualify in the next phase after both having managed to obtain their qualifications from blowout results with teams higher rated than them from the first tier. Nonetheless, beforehand defeating Gaz Metan Mediaș, Rapid did also win two other domestic cup matches against Liga III sides CS Știința Miroslava (3–0) and Cetatea Târgu Neamț (1–0), both away, which made the club obtain a flawless performance with 7 consecutive positive results in both competitions.

At the end of the 2015–16 Liga II season, Rapid CFR Suceava was relegated to Liga III, but maintained the hope to remain in Liga II after more clubs announced that they would not enroll because of the financial problems.

In the middle of 2016 the team changed its name from Rapid CFR Suceava to Foresta Suceava, a name that binds the most important results of the football from Suceava.

== Colours and badge ==
Rapid Suceava used a similar home kit to that of CFR Cluj, namely a white-burgundy one. During away matches they played wearing a black and blue kit. After the rebranding, the new Foresta use a kit that combines yellow and green colors.

== Stadium ==
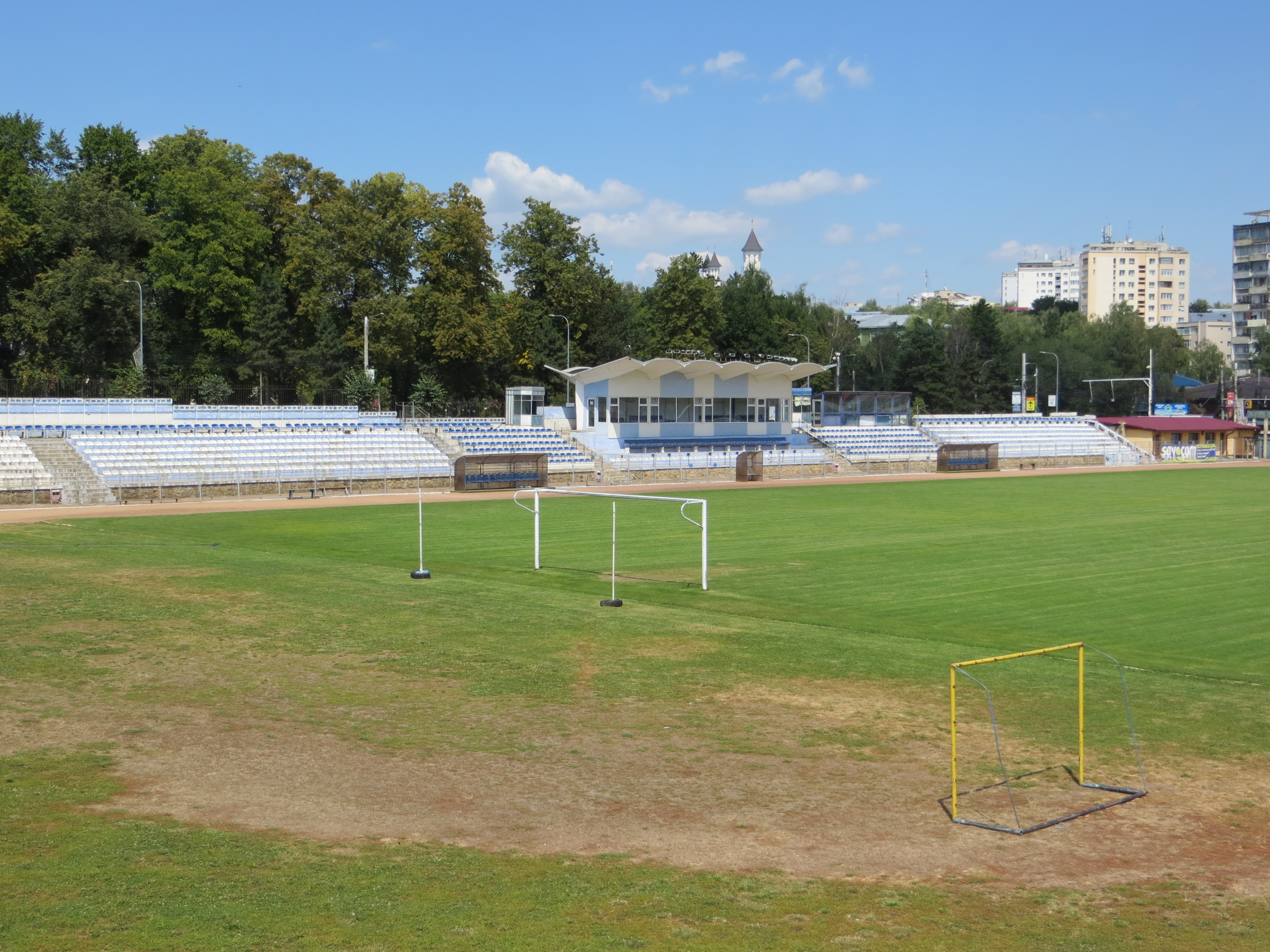
Main Stand of the Areni stadium. The stadium is located in downtown Suceava.

Foresta Suceava plays its home matches on the Areni Stadium. The stadium has a total capacity of 12,500 seats and was opened in 1963 as the Municipal Stadium. Additionally, the stadium was also renovated between the periods 1976–1977, 1980–1982 and 2002 respectively. It is currently ranked 31st in the all time ranking table of stadiums from Romania.

== Honours ==
Liga III

- Winners (2): 2011–12, 2022–23
- Runners-up (3): 2019–20, 2020–21, 2021–22

Liga IV – Suceava County

- Winners (1): 2007–08

== League and Cup history ==
Season	Tier	Division	Place	Cupa României
2023–24	3	Liga III (Seria I)	9th (R)	
2022–23	3	Liga III (Seria I)	1st (C)	
2021–22	3	Liga III (Seria I)	2nd	
2020–21	3	Liga III (Seria I)	2nd	
2019–20	3	Liga III (Seria I)	2nd	Round of 16
2018–19	3	Liga III (Seria I)	5th	
2017–18	2	Liga II	18th (R)	
2016–17	2	Liga II	12th	Round of 32
2015–16	2	Liga II (Seria I)	10th	Round of 32
2014–15	2	Liga II (Seria I)	5th	Round of 16

Season	Tier	Division	Place	Cupa României
2013–14	2	Liga II (Seria I)	10th	
2012–13	2	Liga II (Seria I)	10th	
2011–12	3	Liga III (Seria I)	1st (C, P)	
2010–11	3	Liga III (Seria I)	12th	
2009–10	3	Liga III (Seria I)	5th	
2008–09	3	Liga III (Seria I)	9th	
2007–08	4	Liga IV (SV)	1st (C, P)	
2006–07	4	Liga IV (SV)	4th	
2005–06	4	Divizia D (SV)	3rd	
2004–05	4	Divizia D (SV)	7th	

== Former managers ==
- (Romania) Marin Barbu (2013)
- (Romania) Constantin Ilie (2015–2016)
- (Romania) Daniel Bălan (2016)
- (Romania) Cristian Popovici (2016–2017)
- (Romania) Dorin Goian (2016–2017)
- (Romania) Florentin Petre (2017–2018)
- (Tunisia) Selim Benachour (2018–2019)
- (Romania) Petre Grigoraș (2019–2020)
- (Romania) Dorin Goian (2020)
- (Serbia) Ivan Gvozdenović (2020–2021)
- (Serbia) Ivan Gvozdenović (2022)
- (Romania) Dorin Goian (2022–2023)
