= 2016–17 SC Juventus București season =

Juventus București
2016–17 season
- President: Gheorghe Chivorchian
- Manager: Daniel Oprița
- Stadium: Juventus
- Liga II: Champions
- Cupa României: Fourth Round
- Top goalscorer: League: Bogdan Chipirliu (30); All: Bogdan Chipirliu (30)
- Highest home attendance: 1,500 vs Brașov (10 December 2016)
- Lowest home attendance: 150 vs Foresta Suceava (23 May 2017)
Home colours	Away colours	Third colours

The 2016–17 SC Juventus București season ...

== Players ==
=== First team squad ===
As of February 2017

Note: Flags indicate national team as defined under FIFA eligibility rules; some limited exceptions apply. Players may hold more than one non-FIFA nationality.

No.	Pos.	Nation	Player
1	GK	ROU	Relu Stoian
2	FW	ROU	Alexandru Zaharia
3	DF	ROU	Ioan Neag
5	DF	BRA	Wallace
6	MF	ROU	Mădălin Mihăescu
7	DF	ROU	Ovidiu Morariu
8	MF	ROU	Valentin Bărbulescu (Captain)
9	FW	ROU	Alexandru Muscă
10	MF	ROU	Sorin Buștea
11	MF	ROU	Florin Cazan
12	GK	ROU	Karoly Fila
14	FW	ROU	Vasile Buhăescu
15	FW	ROU	Alin Ilin

No.	Pos.	Nation	Player
17	DF	ROU	Dean Beța
18	DF	ROU	Valentin Dima
19	FW	ROU	Adrian Hurdubei
20	MF	ROU	Alexandru Vasile
22	DF	ROU	Iulian Carabela
23	FW	ROU	Dragoș Florea
29	FW	ROU	George Mareș
30	MF	ROU	Liviu Băjenaru
33	GK	ROU	Eugen Brie
67	FW	ROU	Alexandru Roșca
77	FW	ROU	Bogdan Chipirliu
89	MF	ROU	George Călințaru
99	GK	ROU	Andrei Burlui

=== Transfers ===
Winter:

In:

No.	Pos.	Nation	Player
—	GK	ROU	Andrei Burlui (From Free agent)
—	DF	ROU	Ioan Neag (From Râmnicu Vâlcea)
—	MF	ROU	Alexandru Zaharia (From Gaz Metan Mediaș)
—	FW	ROU	Adrian Hurdubei (From Aerostar Bacău)
—	FW	ROU	Alexandru Muscă (From Dacia Unirea Brăila)

Out:

No.	Pos.	Nation	Player
—	MF	ROU	Vlad Opriș (On loan to CSMȘ Reșița)
—	MF	ROU	Andrei Rontea (On loan to Balotești)
—	MF	ROU	Marian Stoenac (On loan to Cetate Deva)
—	FW	ROU	Alexandru Nica (On loan to Balotești)
—	DF	ROU	Roberto Alecsandru (To Petrolul Ploiești)
—	MF	ROU	Dragoș Arsu (To Free agent)

=== Goalscorers ===
Last updated on 18 June 2017 (UTC)

Player	Liga I	Cupa României	Total
(Romania) Bogdan Chipirliu	30	0	30
(Romania) Vasile Buhăescu	14	0	14
(Romania) George Călințaru	6	0	6
(Romania) Florin Cazan	6	0	6
(Romania) Marian Stoenac	5	0	5
(Romania) Alin Ilin	4	0	4
(Romania) Alexandru Vasile	4	0	4
(Romania) Alexandru Zaharia	4	0	4
(Romania) Liviu Băjenaru	3	0	3
(Romania) Sorin Buștea	3	0	3
(Romania) Mădălin Mihăescu	3	0	3
(Romania) Dragoș Arsu	1	0	1
(Romania) Dean Beța	1	0	1
(Romania) Iulian Carabela	1	0	1
(Romania) Valentin Dima	1	0	1
(Romania) Ovidiu Morariu	1	0	1
(Romania) Alexandru Roșca	1	0	1
(Romania) Tudor Sbârcea	1	0	1

== Competitions ==
=== Liga II ===
==== League table ====
Pos	Team	Pld	W	D	L	GF	GA	GD	Pts	Promotion or relegation
1	Juventus București (C, P)	34	27	3	4	77	18	+59	84	Promotion to Liga I
2	Sepsi OSK (P)	34	21	8	5	62	29	+33	71	Promotion to Liga I
3	UTA Arad	34	20	6	8	64	32	+32	66	Qualification to promotion play-off
4	Mioveni	34	17	8	9	51	30	+21	59	
5	Chindia Târgoviște	34	18	4	12	57	37	+20	58	

Source: FRF (in Romanian)
Rules for classification: 1st points; 2nd head-to-head points; 3rd head-to-head goal difference; 4th head-to-head goals scored; 5th head-to-head away goals scored; 6th goal difference; 7th number of goals scored.
(C) Champions; (P) Promoted

==== League results summary ====
Overall								Home						Away					
Pld	W	D	L	GF	GA	GD	Pts	W	D	L	GF	GA	GD	W	D	L	GF	GA	GD
34	27	3	4	77	18	+59	84	15	1	1	44	9	+35	12	2	3	33	9	+24

Last updated: 3 June 2017 (UTC).

==== League position by round ====
Round	1	2	3	4	5	6	7	8	9	10	11	12	13	14	15	16	17	18	19	20	21	22	23	24	25	26	27	28	29	30	31	32	33	34	35	36	37	38
Ground	H	A	H	A	H	A	H	H	A	H	A	H	A	H	A	H	A	H	A	A	H	A	H	A	H	A	A	H	A	H	A	H	A	H	A	H	A	H
Result	W	L	C	W	W	D	W	W	W	W	W	W	W	C	D	D	W	W	W	L	W	C	W	W	W	W	W	W	W	L	L	W	C	W	W	W	W	W
Position	2	7	8	6	5	5	3	3	1	1	1	1	1	1	1	1	1	1	1	1	1	1	1	1	1	1	1	1	1	1	1	1	1	1	1	1	1	1

Updated to match(es) played on 3 June 2017 (UTC). Source: Matches
A = Away; H = Home; W = Win; D = Draw; L = Loss; C = Canceled

==== Results ====
6 August 2016 Round 1	Juventus București	4–1	Mioveni	Bucharest
11:00 EET (UTC+02)	Chipirliu 45' (pen.), 52'; Călințaru 50', 72'		Năstăsie 38'	Stadium: Stadionul Juventus; Attendance: 500; Referee: Illyeș Adrian; Assistant referees: Dumitru Ionel Valentin, Ionescu Adrian; Fourth official: Trandafir Cristina Mariana

14 August 2016 Round 2	Brașov	1–0	Juventus București	Brașov
11:00 EET (UTC+02)	Ș. Grigorie 37'			Stadium: Stadionul Tineretului; Attendance: 800; Referee: Omuţ Marius; Assistant referees: Iovu Ciprian, Cosma Florin Mihai; Fourth official: Ștef Claudiu

20 August 2016 Round 3	Juventus București	canceled (18–0)	Șoimii Pâncota	Bucharest
11:00 EET (UTC+02)	Buhăescu 6', 17', 42'; A. Ilin 11', 41'; Mihăescu 18'; Alexandru 23', 29', 49', 75'; Florea 51'; Dima 55'; Sbârcea 58'; Stoenac 65', 71', 73', 87'; Nica 90'			Stadium: Stadionul Juventus; Attendance: 500; Referee: Iugulescu Ionuţ Valentin; Assistant referees: Peter Joszef, Dobre Răzvan Mihai; Fourth official: Catana Cristian

27 August 2016 Round 4	Luceafărul Oradea	0–1	Juventus București	Sânmartin
11:00 EET (UTC+02)			Carabela 73'	Stadium: Stadionul Luceafărul; Attendance: 600; Referee: Andrei Florin; Assistant referees: Szekely Iulian, Cîmpeanu Petrică Ionut; Fourth official: Lunca Dragoș Nicolae

3 September 2016 Round 5	Juventus București	2–0	Afumați	Bucharest
17:00 EET (UTC+02)	Chipirliu 11'; Băjenaru 45'			Stadium: Stadionul Juventus; Attendance: 550; Referee: Ionașcu Laurenţiu; Assistant referees: Badea Marius Florin, Bîrdeș Romică; Fourth official: Safta Mihai

10 September 2016 Round 6	Sepsi Sfântu Gheorghe	0–0	Juventus București	Sfântu Gheorghe
11:00 EET (UTC+02)				Stadium: Stadionul Municipal; Attendance: 1,500; Referee: Coza Ionuţ; Assistant referees: Pucheanu Florin, Cătană Gabriel Ion; Fourth official: Catana Cristian

16 September 2016 Round 7	Juventus București	3–0	Academica Clinceni	Bucharest
17:00 EET (UTC+02)	Chipirliu 35' (pen.), 41', 69'			Stadium: Stadionul Juventus; Attendance: 300; Referee: Avram Robert; Assistant referees: Vișan Florian Alexandru, Vlase Daniel; Fourth official: Macovei Florin Aurelian

20 September 2016 Round 8	Juventus București	1–0	Olimpia Satu Mare	Bucharest
17:00 EET (UTC+02)	Chipirliu 25' (pen.)			Stadium: Stadionul Juventus; Attendance: 450; Referee: Eduard Ioniţă; Assistant referees: Erchian Ionus, Florin Iacob; Fourth official: Laurentiu Ciuchiţă

25 September 2016 Round 9	Dunărea Călărași	1–2	Juventus București	Călărași
13:00 EET (UTC+02)	Ciocâlteu 71'		Buhăescu 29'; Călințaru 70'	Stadium: Stadionul Ion Comșa; Attendance: 300; Referee: Dima Iulian; Assistant referees: Velicu Bogdan, Radu Iulian; Fourth official: Ivan Ionel

30 September 2016 Round 10	Juventus București	6–0	Unirea Tărlungeni	Bucharest
16:00 EET (UTC+02)	Chipirliu 22', 34' (pen.), 74'; Beța 45'; Călințaru 81'; Morariu 89'			Stadium: Stadionul Juventus; Attendance: 350; Referee: Busi Cătălin; Assistant referees: Antal Damian, Dută George Bogdan; Fourth official: Porumbel Valentin

8 October 2016 Round 11	UTA Arad	0–1	Juventus București	Arad
15:30 EET (UTC+02)			A. David 70' (o.g.)	Stadium: Stadionul Motorul; Attendance: 600; Referee: Marcu Florin Mihai; Assistant referees: Marica Mihai Marius, Badea Marius Florin; Fourth official: Barzuca Dorian

12 October 2016 Round 12	Juventus București	5–0	ASU Politehnica Timișoara	Bucharest
11:00 EET (UTC+02)	Băjenaru 16'; Todorov 25' (o.g.); Buhăescu 47', 63'; Chipirliu 88'			Stadium: Stadionul Juventus; Attendance: 300; Referee: Peșu Ionela Alina; Assistant referees: Tepusa Mihaela, Nan Marilena Catalina; Fourth official: Porumbel Valentin

22 October 2016 Round 13	Balotești	0–2	Juventus București	Balotești
11:30 EET (UTC+02)			Chipirliu 62' (pen.), 88'	Stadium: Stadionul Balotești; Attendance: 250; Referee: Dumitrică Omar Cristian; Assistant referees: Dumitru Ionel Valentin, Vatamanu Cosmin; Fourth official: Safta Mihai

28 October 2016 Round 14	Juventus București	canceled (5–0)	Berceni	Bucharest
15:00 EET (UTC+02)	Chipirliu 17', 48' (pen.); Buhăescu 50'; Călințaru 63' (pen.); Arsu 86'			Stadium: Stadionul Juventus; Attendance: 250; Referee: Oprea Ovidiu Petru; Assistant referees: Cosma Florin Mihai, Roman Andrei Alexandru; Fourth official: Naidin Marius

5 November 2016 Round 15	Chindia Târgoviște	0–0	Juventus București	Târgoviște
11:30 EET (UTC+02)				Stadium: Stadionul Eugen Popescu; Attendance: 2,000; Referee: Comănescu Adrian; Assistant referees: Bobe Ionuţ Marius, Babadac Ionuţ; Fourth official: Avram Robert

12 November 2016 Round 16	Juventus București	0–0	Râmnicu Vâlcea	Bucharest
12:00 EET (UTC+02)				Stadium: Stadionul Juventus; Attendance: 350; Referee: Ionita Eduard; Assistant referees: Ionus Erchian, Iacob Florin; Fourth official: Ciuchita Laurentiu

20 November 2016 Round 17	Foresta Suceava	1–2	Juventus București	Suceava
13:00 EET (UTC+02)	Dănilă 13'		F. Cazan 1'; Chipirliu 90+2' (pen.)	Stadium: Stadionul Areni; Attendance: 2,500; Referee: Rusandu Lucian; Assistant referees: Bucsi Imre-Laszlo, Slabu Stelian; Fourth official: Andrei Florin

23 November 2016 Round 18	Juventus București	1–0	Dacia Unirea Brăila	Bucharest
14:00 EET (UTC+02)	F. Cazan 55'			Stadium: Stadionul Juventus; Attendance: 300; Referee: Amoraritei Mihai; Assistant referees: Dragoș Bogdan Ioan, Cantemir Constantin Mihai; Fourth official: Naidin Marius

26 November 2016 Round 19	Metalul Reșița	1–2	Juventus București	Snagov
11:00 EET (UTC+02)	Cioranu 14'		Chipirliu 17' (pen.); Buștea 58'	Stadium: Stadionul Voința; Attendance: 100; Referee: Botescu Dan Grigore; Assistant referees: Voicu Cristian, Cătană Gabriel Ion; Fourth official: Kiriţă Adrian

2 December 2016 Round 20	Mioveni	1–0	Juventus București	Mioveni
18:00 EET (UTC+02)	Staicu 44'			Stadium: Stadionul Orășenesc; Attendance: 500; Referee: Andrei Florin; Assistant referees: Vodă Alexandru, Ciocănea Ioan Daniel; Fourth official: Iugulescu Ionuţ Valentin

10 December 2016 Round 21	Juventus București	2–1	Brașov	Bucharest
11:00 EET (UTC+02)	Buhăescu 5'; Chipirliu 86'		Ș. Grigorie 50'	Stadium: Stadionul Juventus; Attendance: 1,500; Referee: Colţescu Sebastian; Assistant referees: Iliescu Dragoș Mihai, Popescu Adrian; Fourth official: Anghelinei Bogdan Ionuţ

25 February 2017 Round 22	Șoimii Pâncota	canceled	Juventus București
11:00 EET (UTC+02)

4 March 2017 Round 23	Juventus București	2–1	Luceafărul Oradea	Bucharest
12:00 EET (UTC+02)	F. Cazan 16'; Mihăescu 22'		Matei 45+1'	Stadium: Stadionul Juventus; Attendance: 1,000; Referee: Avram Robert; Assistant referees: Brînză Iulian Cătălin, Iovu Ciprian; Fourth official: Dan Florin Costin

11 March 2017 Round 24	Afumați	1–3	Juventus București	Afumați
12:00 EET (UTC+02)	Vlada 75' (pen.)		Zaharia 48', 57'; Covalschi 54'	Stadium: Stadionul Afumați; Attendance: 750; Referee: Coza Ionuţ; Assistant referees: Necula Mihaita, Peter Joszef; Fourth official: Anghelinei Bogdan Ionuţ

18 March 2017 Round 25	Juventus București	3–1	Sepsi Sfântu Gheorghe	Bucharest
11:00 EET (UTC+02)	Zaharia 6'; Chipirliu 55'; Buhăescu 81'		Hadnagy 44' (pen.)	Stadium: Stadionul Juventus; Attendance: 1,000; Referee: Balaci Marian; Assistant referees: Badea Marius Florin, Bîrdeș Romică; Fourth official: Dumitrică Omar Cristian

26 March 2017 Round 26	Academica Clinceni	0–7	Juventus București	Clinceni
12:00 EET (UTC+02)			Chipirliu 2', 11' (pen.), 27', 37', 64', 89'; Buhăescu 85'	Stadium: Stadionul Clinceni; Attendance: 400; Referee: Dima Iulian; Assistant referees: Cîmpeanu Petrică Ionut, Bălan Marius; Fourth official: Amoraritei Mihai

1 April 2017 Round 27	Olimpia Satu Mare	1–3	Juventus București	Satu Mare
12:00 EET (UTC+02)	Pop 44' (pen.)		Roșca 21'; Buhăescu 45+1'; Chipirliu 90+1'	Stadium: Stadionul Olimpia; Attendance: 900; Referee: Dumitru Robert George; Assistant referees: Szabo Gero, Marica Mihai Marius; Fourth official: Ardelean Mircea

8 April 2017 Round 28	Juventus București	1–0	Dunărea Călărași	Bucharest
12:00 EET (UTC+02)	Buhăescu 8'			Stadium: Stadionul Juventus; Attendance: 500; Referee: Oprea Ovidiu Petru; Assistant referees: Arusoaiei Ovidiu, Roman Andrei Alexandru; Fourth official: Ionita Eduard

15 April 2017 Round 29	Unirea Tărlungeni	0–3 (awarded)	Juventus București	Ștefăneștii de Jos
11:00 EET (UTC+02)				Stadium: Stadionul Dumitru Mătărău

22 April 2017 Round 30	Juventus București	1–2	UTA Arad	Bucharest
11:00 EET (UTC+02)	Băjenaru 4'		Curtuiuș 45+1'; Gligor 47'	Stadium: Stadionul Juventus; Attendance: 800; Referee: Andrei Florin; Assistant referees: Bîrdeș Romică, Dumitru Ionel Valentin; Fourth official: Avram Robert

26 April 2017 Round 31	ASU Politehnica Timișoara	2–1	Juventus București	Timișoara
15:00 EET (UTC+02)	M. Stancu 8'; Blănaru 55'		Chipirliu 10'	Stadium: Stadionul Știința; Attendance: 650; Referee: Rusandu Lucian; Assistant referees: Fridl George Marian, Peter Joszef; Fourth official: Popa Sergiu

30 April 2017 Round 32	Juventus București	3–1	Balotești	Bucharest
11:00 EET (UTC+02)	F. Cazan 33', 62'; Marciuc 77' (o.g.)		V. Andrei	Stadium: Stadionul Juventus; Attendance: 200; Referee: Dan Florin Costin; Assistant referees: Necula Mihaita, Bălan Gheorghită; Fourth official: Dicu Madalin

6 May 2017 Round 33	Berceni	canceled	Juventus București
11:00 EET (UTC+02)

12 May 2017 Round 34	Juventus București	2–1	Chindia Târgoviște	Bucharest
18:00 EET (UTC+02)	Zaharia 60'; Chipirliu 77'		Cherchez 30'	Stadium: Stadionul Juventus; Attendance: 500; Referee: Popa Sergiu; Assistant referees: Szekely Iulian, Lucaciu Doru Claudiu; Fourth official: Dumitrică Omar Cristian

20 May 2017 Round 35	Râmnicu Vâlcea	0–3 (awarded)	Juventus București	Râmnicu Vâlcea
11:00 EET (UTC+02)				Stadium: Stadionul Municipal

23 May 2017 Round 36	Juventus București	5–1	Foresta Suceava	Bucharest
11:00 EET (UTC+02)	Buștea 20'; Călințaru 37'; A. Ilin 73', 82'; Chipirliu 86'		Vraciu 70'	Stadium: Stadionul Juventus; Attendance: 150; Referee: Pană Catalin Marian; Assistant referees: Tepusa Mihaela, Apostu Alexandra Theodora; Fourth official: Demetrescu Iuliana Elena

28 May 2017 Round 37	Dacia Unirea Brăila	0–3	Juventus București	Brăila
11:00 EET (UTC+02)			Mihăescu 28'; Chipirliu 45+1' (pen.); Buhăescu 76'	Stadium: Stadionul Municipal; Attendance: 250; Referee: Busi Cătălin; Assistant referees: Truţă Marian, Mihaila Alexandru; Fourth official: Ionita Eduard

31 May 2017 Round 38	Juventus București	3–0	Metalul Reșița	Bucharest
17:00 EET (UTC+02)	Buștea 18'; Buhăescu 32'; F. Cazan 84'			Stadium: Stadionul Juventus; Attendance: 1,000; Referee: Anghelinei Bogdan Ionuţ; Assistant referees: Dragoș Bogdan Ioan, Cantemir Constantin Mihai; Fourth official: Amoraritei Mihai

=== Cupa României ===
==== Results ====
4 October 2016 Fourth Round	Juventus București	0–2	Academica Clinceni	Bucharest
14:30 EET (UTC+02)			Lemnaru 12', 51'	Stadium: Stadionul Juventus; Referee: Dumitrache Bogdan; Assistant referees: Măndită Cristian Ionut, Neacsu Ionut Traian; Fourth official: Porumbel Valentin

== See also ==
- 2016–17 Cupa României
- 2016–17 Liga II
