= List of ASC Daco-Getica București seasons =

The Romanian football team ASC Daco-Getica București (until 2018 known as SC Juventus București) played in the second and third tiers of the Romanian football league system until 2017, when they won promotion to Liga I.

== Seasons ==
Season	League		Cupa României	Coach
Season	Division	Pos	Cupa României	Coach
1992–93	Divizia C	11th		Anghelescu
1993–94	Divizia C	16th		Anghelescu
1994–95	Divizia C	13th		Anghelescu
1995–96	Divizia C	17th		Unknown
1997–98	Divizia C	13th		Unknown
1998–99	Divizia C	2nd		Unknown
1999–00	Divizia B	12th		Unknown
2000–01	Divizia B	16th		Unknown
2001–02	Divizia C	2nd		Unknown
2002–03	Divizia C	3rd		Unknown
2003–04	Divizia B	5th		Unknown
2004–05	Divizia B	12th		Unknown – Moldovan
2005–06	Divizia B	14th		Unknown
2006–07	Liga III	2nd	Round of 32	Unknown
2007–08	Liga III	2nd		Buburuz
2008–09	Liga III	5th		Unknown
2009–10	Liga III	Champion		Unknown
2010–11	Liga II	16th	Round of 32	Artimon – Chița
2011–12	Liga II	14th	Round of 32	Schumacher – Grigore – Floruț
2012–13	Liga III	6th		Trică
2013–14	Liga III	5th		Grigore
2014–15	Liga III	2nd	Second Round	Trică – Barbu
2015–16	Liga III	Champion	Third Round	Oprița
2016–17	Liga II	Champion	Fourth Round	Oprița
2017–18	Liga I			Oprița – Barbu

Key

Winner	Runners-up	Third place	Promotion	Relegation
