= 1954 Divizia B =

15th season of the Divizia B, the second tier of the Romanian football league

Divizia B
- Season: 1954
- Promoted: Progresul FB București; Avântul Reghin; Locomotiva Constanța
- Relegated: Flacăra Pitești; Constructorul Arad; Locomotiva Pașcani; Locomotiva Oradea; Constructorul Craiova; Metalul Brăila

The 1954 Divizia B was the 15th season of the second tier of the Romanian football league system.

The format has been changed to three series, each of them having 13 teams. At the end of the season the winners of the series promoted to Divizia A and last two places from each series relegated to District Championship. This was the fifth season played in the spring-autumn system, a system imposed by the new leadership of the country which were in close ties with the Soviet Union.

== Team changes ==
=== To Divizia B ===
Promoted from Regional Championship

- Constructorul Arad
- Constructorul Craiova
- Dinamo 6 București
- Dinamo Galați
- Flamura Roșie Buhuși
- Flamura Roșie Cluj
- Locomotiva Constanța
- Locomotiva Pașcani
- Metalul Ploiești
- Metalul Tractorul
- Spartac Burdujeni
- Spartac Focșani

Relegated from Divizia A

- —

=== From Divizia B ===
Relegated to Regional Championship

- Șantierul Constanța

Promoted to Divizia A

- Flacăra Ploiești
- Metalul Hunedoara
- Metalul Câmpia Turzii

=== Excluded teams ===
CA Câmpulung Moldovenesc, CA Cluj and CA Craiova were excluded from the championship. The army teams (CA) were abolished in the summer of 1953, except for CCA București.

=== Enrolled teams ===
Voința București, which was in fact, the Romania national youth team, was enrolled directly in the second division.

=== Renamed teams ===
Flamura Roșie Pitești was renamed as Flacăra Pitești.

Libertatea Sibiu was renamed as Progresul Sibiu.

=== Other teams ===
Dinamo Turnu Măgurele was moved from Turnu Măgurele to Bârlad and renamed as Dinamo Bârlad.

== League tables ==
=== Serie I ===
Pos	Team	Pld	W	D	L	GF	GA	GD	Pts	Promotion or relegation
1	Progresul FB București (C, P)	24	15	7	2	50	18	+32	37	Promotion to Divizia A
2	Progresul Sibiu	24	12	6	6	34	22	+12	30	
3	Voința București	24	9	12	3	32	25	+7	30	
4	Metalul Steagul Roșu	24	10	9	5	46	34	+12	29	
5	Flamura Roșie Sfântu Gheorghe	24	10	7	7	31	25	+6	27	
6	Flacăra Moreni	24	7	11	6	31	33	−2	25	
7	Metalul Tractorul	24	9	6	9	31	33	−2	24	
8	Metalul Câmpina	24	9	5	10	39	39	0	23	
9	Metalul București	24	7	6	11	35	35	0	20	
10	Locomotiva Craiova	24	7	5	12	29	35	−6	19	
11	Locomotiva Turnu Severin	24	5	9	10	32	43	−11	19	
12	Flacăra Pitești (R)	24	5	8	11	20	30	−10	18	Relegation to Regional Championship
13	Constructorul Craiova (R)	24	2	7	15	18	56	−38	11	Relegation to Regional Championship

Source: romaniansoccer.ro
Rules for classification: 1) Points 2) Head-to-head points; 3) Head-to-head goal difference; 4) Head-to-head goals scored; 5) Head-to-head away goals scored; 6) Goal difference; 7) Goals scored.
(C) Champions; (P) Promoted; (R) Relegated

=== Serie II ===
Pos	Team	Pld	W	D	L	GF	GA	GD	Pts	Promotion or relegation
1	Avântul Reghin (C, P)	24	12	7	5	35	20	+15	31	Promotion to Divizia A
2	Flacăra Mediaș	24	11	6	7	29	19	+10	28	
3	Flamura Roșie Cluj	24	11	6	7	36	27	+9	28	
4	Metalul Baia Mare	24	12	4	8	36	30	+6	28	
5	Locomotiva Cluj	24	10	6	8	33	26	+7	26	
6	Minerul Lupeni	24	8	9	7	32	29	+3	25	
7	Metalul Reșița	24	10	4	10	26	22	+4	24	
8	Locomotiva Arad	24	9	5	10	21	31	−10	23	
9	Dinamo 6 București	24	8	6	10	28	35	−7	22	
10	Progresul Satu Mare	24	8	6	10	24	28	−4	22	
11	Metalul Oradea	24	7	7	10	14	25	−11	21	
12	Constructorul Arad (R)	24	7	6	11	25	28	−3	20	Relegation to Regional Championship
13	Locomotiva Oradea (R)	24	6	2	16	20	39	−19	14	Relegation to Regional Championship

Source: romaniansoccer.ro
Rules for classification: 1) Points 2) Head-to-head points; 3) Head-to-head goal difference; 4) Head-to-head goals scored; 5) Head-to-head away goals scored; 6) Goal difference; 7) Goals scored.
(C) Champions; (P) Promoted; (R) Relegated

=== Serie III ===
Pos	Team	Pld	W	D	L	GF	GA	GD	Pts	Promotion or relegation
1	Locomotiva Constanța (C, P)	24	16	6	2	50	21	+29	38	Promotion to Divizia A
2	Dinamo Bacău	24	15	5	4	47	21	+26	35	
3	Locomotiva Iași	24	12	5	7	43	23	+20	29	
4	Flamura Roșie Bacău	24	10	8	6	31	22	+9	28	
5	Flamura Roșie Buhuși	24	10	5	9	32	32	0	25	
6	Metalul Ploiești	24	11	2	11	31	32	−1	24	
7	Spartac Burdujeni	24	8	7	9	29	38	−9	23	
8	Dinamo Bârlad	24	6	9	9	34	35	−1	21	
9	Știința Iași	24	5	10	9	27	34	−7	20	
10	Spartac Focșani	24	6	7	11	25	34	−9	19	
11	Dinamo Galați	24	7	5	12	20	39	−19	19	
12	Locomotiva Pașcani (R)	24	5	6	13	26	47	−21	16	Relegation to Regional Championship
13	Metalul Brăila (R)	24	4	7	13	25	42	−17	15	Relegation to Regional Championship

Source: romaniansoccer.ro
Rules for classification: 1) Points 2) Head-to-head points; 3) Head-to-head goal difference; 4) Head-to-head goals scored; 5) Head-to-head away goals scored; 6) Goal difference; 7) Goals scored.
(C) Champions; (P) Promoted; (R) Relegated

== See also ==
- 1954 Divizia A
- 1954 Regional Championship
- 1954 Cupa României
