= Florin Cazan =

Romanian footballer

Personal information
- Full name: Florin Mădălin Cazan
- Date of birth: 10 May 1997 (age 29)
- Place of birth: Fierbinți-Târg, Romania
- Height: 1.75 m (5 ft 9 in)
- Position: Midfielder

Youth career
- Juventus București

Senior career*
Years	Team	Apps	(Gls)
2015–2018	Juventus București	32	(6)
2018	→ Unirea Slobozia (loan)	3	(0)
2018–2019	SCM Gloria Buzău	17	(7)
2019	→ Focșani (loan)	1	(0)
2020–2021	Râmnicu Sărat	7	(6)
2021–2023	Sporting Roșiori	43	(30)
2023–2024	Râmnicu Sărat	26	(10)
- * Club domestic league appearances and goals as of 08:33, 7 December 2024 (UTC)

Florin Mădălin Cazan (born 10 May 1997) is a Romanian professional footballer who plays as a midfielder.

== Honours ==
SCM Gloria Buzău

- Liga III: 2018–19
