= 1953 Regional Championship =

12th season of the Liga IV, the fourth tier of the Romanian football league

Liga IV
- Season: 1953

The 1953 Regional Championship was the 12th season of the Regional Championship, 3rd as the third tier of Romanian football. The champions of each regional championships play against each other in the playoffs to earn promotion to Divizia B.

== Regional championships ==
- Arad (AR)
- Bacău (BC)
- Baia Mare (BM)
- Bârlad (BD)
- Bucharest Municipality (B)
- Bucharest Region (B)
- Cluj (CJ)
- Constanța (CT)
- Craiova (CR)
- Galați (GL)
- Hunedoara (HD)
- Iași (IS)
- Mureș (MS)
- Oradea (OR)
- Pitești (PI)
- Ploiești (PL)
- Stalin (ST)
- Suceava (SV)
- Timișoara (TM)

== Promotion play-off ==
Twenty teams participate in the promotion tournament. The teams were divided into two groups of four, and the first ranked teams from each group promoted to second division. The matches was played on neutral grounds at Ploiești, Iași, Sibiu and Arad.

However, the second division was expanded from the next season and, along with the four group winners, another eight teams were promoted to the 1954 Divizia B.

=== Series I (Ploiești) ===
Pos	Team	Pld	W	D	L	GF	GA	GD	Pts	Qualification
1	Flamura Roșie Buhuși (BC) (P)	4	3	1	0	7	2	+5	7	Promotion to Divizia B
2	Spartac Focșani (BD)	4	1	2	1	8	5	+3	4	
3	Locomotiva Pașcani (IS)	4	2	0	2	7	5	+2	4	
4	Dinamo Galați (GL)	4	2	0	2	7	10	−3	4	
5	Spartac Burdujeni (SV)	4	0	1	3	2	9	−7	1	

Rules for classification: 1) points; 2) goal difference; 3) number of goals scored.
(P) Promoted

Results

25 October 1953	Spartac Burdujeni	1–1	Spartac Focșani	Ploiești

25 October 1953	Dinamo Galați	3–0	Locomotiva Pașcani	Ploiești

29 October 1953	Spartac Focșani	1–1	Flamura Roșie Buhuși	Ploiești

29 October 1953	Spartac Burdujeni	0–3	Dinamo Galați	Ploiești

1 November 1953	Locomotiva Pașcani	4–1	Spartac Burdujeni	Ploiești

1 November 1953	Flamura Roșie Buhuși	4–1	Dinamo Galați	Ploiești

5 November 1953	Locomotiva Pașcani	3–0	Spartac Focșani	Ploiești

5 November 1953	Flamura Roșie Buhuși	1–0	Spartac Burdujeni	Ploiești

8 November 1953	Flamura Roșie Buhuși	1–0	Locomotiva Pașcani	Ploiești

8 November 1953	Spartac Focșani	6–0	Dinamo Galați	Ploiești

=== Series II (Iași) ===
Pos	Team	Pld	W	D	L	GF	GA	GD	Pts	Qualification
1	Locomotiva PCA Constanța (CT) (P)	4	2	2	0	7	2	+5	6	Promotion to Divizia B
2	Dinamo Oltenița (B)	4	2	1	1	5	6	−1	5	
3	Metalul 1 Mai Ploiești (PL)	4	2	0	2	3	3	0	4	
4	Bucegi Câmpulung (PI)	4	1	1	2	5	7	−2	3	
5	Progresul CPCS București (B)	4	0	2	2	3	5	−2	2	

Rules for classification: 1) points; 2) goal difference; 3) number of goals scored.
(P) Promoted

Results

27 October 1953	Metalul 1 Mai Ploiești	0–2	Locomotiva PCA Constanța	Iași

27 October 1953	Progresul CPCS București	1–1	Bucegi Câmpulung	Iași

1 November 1953	Metalul 1 Mai Ploiești	1–0	Progresul CPCS București	Iași

1 November 1953	Locomotiva PCA Constanța	1–1	Dinamo Oltenița	Iași

5 November 1953	Bucegi Câmpulung	4–1	Dinamo Oltenița	Iași

5 November 1953	Locomotiva PCA Constanța	1–1	Progresul CPCS București	Iași

8 November 1953	Metalul 1 Mai Ploiești	2–0	Bucegi Câmpulung	Iași

8 November 1953	Dinamo Oltenița	2–1	Progresul CPCS București	Iași

11 November 1953	Dinamo Oltenița	1–0	Metalul 1 Mai Ploiești	Iași

11 November 1953	Bucegi Câmpulung	0–3	Locomotiva PCA Constanța	Iași

=== Series III (Sibiu) ===
Pos	Team	Pld	W	D	L	GF	GA	GD	Pts	Qualification
1	Dinamo 6 București (B) (P)	4	3	1	0	12	4	+8	7	Promotion to Divizia B
2	Constructorul Arad (AR)	4	2	1	1	6	4	+2	5	
3	Progresul Timișoara (TM)	4	0	3	1	3	5	−2	3	
4	Constructorul Craiova (CR)	4	0	3	1	3	7	−4	3	
5	Avântul Petrești (HD)	4	0	2	2	4	8	−4	2	

Rules for classification: 1) points; 2) goal difference; 3) number of goals scored.
(P) Promoted

Results

25 October 1953	Constructorul Arad	1–1	Constructorul Craiova	Sibiu

28 October 1953	Progresul Timișoara	0–2	Constructorul Arad	Sibiu

28 October 1953	Dinamo 6 București	4–0	Constructorul Craiova	Sibiu

1 November 1953	Constructorul Craiova	1–1	Avântul Petrești	Sibiu

2 November 1953	Progresul Timișoara	1–1	Dinamo 6 București	Sibiu

5 November 1954	Progresul Timișoara	1–1	Constructorul Craiova	Sibiu

5 November 1954	Constructorul Arad	2–0	Avântul Petrești	Sibiu

8 November 1953	Avântul Petrești	1–1	Progresul Timișoara	Sibiu

8 November 1953	Dinamo 6 București	3–1	Constructorul Arad	Sibiu

11 November 1953	Dinamo 6 București	4–2	Avântul Petrești	Sibiu

=== Series IV (Arad) ===
Pos	Team	Pld	W	D	L	GF	GA	GD	Pts	Qualification
1	Flamura Roșie Cluj (CJ) (P)	4	3	1	0	13	4	+9	7	Promotion to Divizia B
2	Metalul Tractorul Orașul Stalin (ST)	4	2	1	1	9	8	+1	5	
3	Spartac Salonta (OR)	4	2	0	2	9	6	+3	4	
4	Spartac Târgu Mureș (MS)	4	2	0	2	9	10	−1	4	
5	Avântul Sighetu Marmației (BM)	4	0	0	4	7	19	−12	0	

Rules for classification: 1) points; 2) goal difference; 3) number of goals scored.
(P) Promoted

Results

25 October 1953	Metalul Tractorul Orașul Stalin	4–3	Avântul Sighetu Marmației	Arad

25 October 1953	Spartac Salonta	2–1	Spartac Târgu Mureș	Arad

28 October 1953	Metalul Tractorul Orașul Stalin	2–1	Spartac Salonta	Arad

28 October 1953	Flamura Roșie Cluj	4–2	Spartac Târgu Mureș	Arad

1 November 1953	Metalul Tractorul Orașul Stalin	1–1	Flamura Roșie Cluj	Arad

1 November 1953	Spartac Salonta	6–1	Avântul Sighetu Marmației	Arad

5 November 1953	Flamura Roșie Cluj	2–0	Spartac Salonta	Arad

5 November 1953	Spartac Târgu Mureș	3–2	Avântul Sighetu Marmației	Arad

8 November 1953	Flamura Roșie Cluj	6–1	Avântul Sighetu Marmației	Arad

8 November 1953	Spartac Târgu Mureș	3–2	Metalul Tractorul Orașul Stalin	Arad

== Championships standings ==
=== Bacău Region ===
Championship play-off

The championship play-off was contested in a single round-robin tournament featuring the first two ranked teams of the two regional series. All matches were played at the Libertății Park Stadium in Bacău.

Pos	Team	Pld	W	D	L	GF	GA	GD	Pts	Qualification
1	Flamura Roșie Buhuși (C, Q)	3	3	0	0	8	1	+7	6	Qualification to promotion play-off
2	Spartac Bacău	3	2	0	1	5	5	0	4	
3	Minerul Comănești	3	1	0	2	2	4	−2	2	
4	Avântul Piatra Neamț	3	0	0	3	1	6	−5	0	

Rules for classification: 1) Points; 2) Goal difference; 3) Number of goals scored.
(C) Champions; (Q) Qualified for the phase indicated

Results

6 September 1953	Spartac Bacău	1–3	Flamura Roșie Buhuși

6 September 1953	Minerul Comănești	1–0	Avântul Piatra Neamț

13 September 1953	Avântul Piatra Neamț	1–2	Spartac Bacău

13 September 1953	Flamura Roșie Buhuși	2–0	Minerul Comănești

16 September 1953	Flamura Roșie Buhuși	3–0	Avântul Piatra Neamț

16 September 1953	Spartac Bacău	2–1	Minerul Comănești

=== Ploiești Region ===
Series A

Pos	Team	Pld	W	D	L	GF	GA	GD	Pts	Qualification or relegation
1	Metalul 1 Mai Ploiești (Q)	22	20	1	1	110	14	+96	41	Qualification to championship final
2	CFR Ploiești	22	19	2	1	85	17	+68	40	
3	Metalul 114 Mija	22	12	5	5	42	36	+6	29	
4	Victoria Petrol Florești	22	11	2	9	40	44	−4	24	
5	Flacăra GRT Moreni	22	8	6	8	30	46	−16	22	
6	Flacăra Ochiuri	22	9	3	10	33	52	−19	21	
7	Constructorul Ploiești	22	8	4	10	48	43	+5	20	
8	Metalul Sinaia	22	6	6	10	51	53	−2	18	
9	Locomotiva Buzău	22	5	6	11	29	51	−22	16	
10	Flacăra Târgoviște	22	6	2	14	22	51	−29	14	
11	Flacăra Boldești	22	4	3	15	26	56	−30	11	
12	Progresul Pucioasa	22	3	2	17	23	76	−53	8	

Rules for classification: 1) points; 2) goal difference; 3) number of goals scored.
(Q) Qualified for the phase indicated

Series B

Pos	Team	Pld	W	D	L	GF	GA	GD	Pts	Qualification or relegation
1	Metalul Târgoviște (Q)	22	17	4	1	86	20	+66	38	Qualification to championship final
2	Metalul 113 Plopeni	22	15	7	0	72	23	+49	37	
3	Flacăra Rafinăria 4 Câmpina	22	16	3	3	81	14	+67	35	
4	Negoiul Ploiești	22	12	3	7	53	39	+14	27	
5	Flacăra Băicoi	22	11	2	9	47	54	−7	24	
6	Spartac Râmnicu Sărat	22	9	1	12	33	47	−14	19	
7	Constructorul Fieni	22	9	1	12	42	60	−18	19	
8	Șantierul Ploiești	22	8	2	12	33	47	−14	18	
9	Flacăra Gura Ocniței	22	7	3	12	42	65	−23	17	
10	Avântul Bușteni	22	7	3	12	30	48	−18	17	
11	Flacăra Rafinăria 5 Ploiești	22	3	2	17	22	74	−52	8	
12	Spartac Cislău	22	2	1	19	18	68	−50	5	

Rules for classification: 1) points; 2) goal difference; 3) number of goals scored.
(Q) Qualified for the phase indicated

Championship final

The championship final was contested between the winners of the two series of the regional championship and was played over six play-off matches.
The first three matches was played on 8, 12 and 15 October 1953.

Team 1	Series	Team 2	Game 1	Game 2	Game 3
Metalul 1 Mai Ploiești	4–4	Metalul Târgoviște	2–1	1–2	1–1 (Note: The match was played on neutral ground at Câmpina.)

The next matches was played on 19 October 1953 at Băicoi and on 22 and 23 October 1953 at București on Spartac Finanțe-Bănci Stadium.

Team 1	Series	Team 2	Game 1	Game 2	Game 3
Metalul 1 Mai Ploiești	6–0	Metalul Târgoviște	0–0	0–0	6–0

Metalul 1 Mai Ploiești won the Ploiești Regional Championship and qualify for promotion play-off in Divizia B.

== See also ==
- 1953 Divizia A
- 1953 Divizia B
- 1953 Cupa României
