= Milcovul Stadium =

Romanian stadium

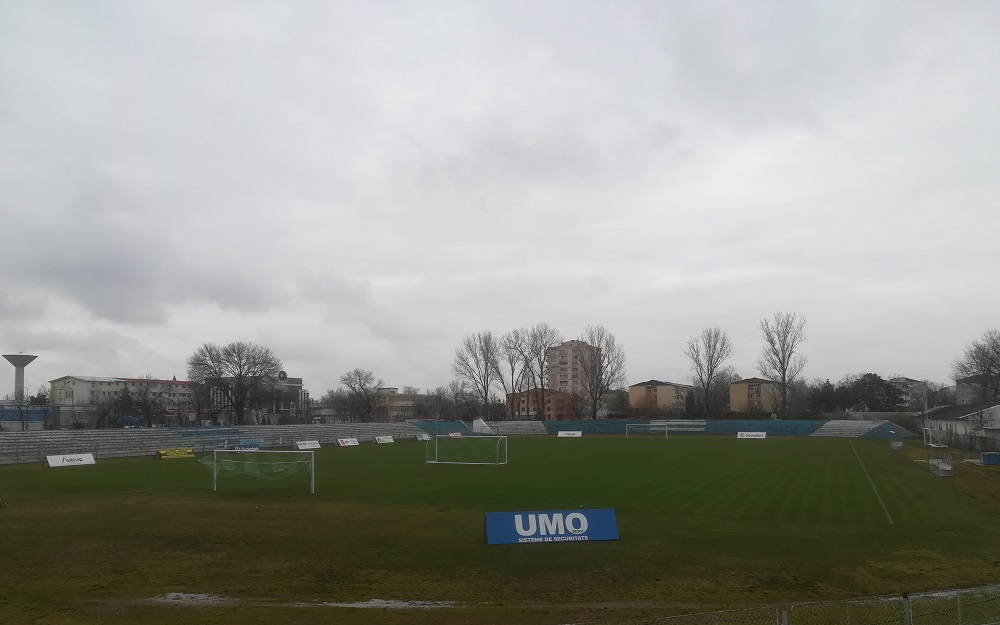
- Interactive map of Milcovul Stadium
- Address: Aleea Stadionului, nr. 2
- Location: Focșani, Romania
- Coordinates: 45°40′31.3″N 27°10′41.7″E
- Owner: Municipality of Focșani
- Operator: Focșani
- Capacity: 8,500 (560 seated)
- Surface: Grass

Construction
- Opened: 4 May 1974
- Renovated: 2005

Tenant
- Focșani (1974–present)

The Milcovul Stadium, also known as Milcovul Sud Stadium, is a multi-use stadium in Focşani, Romania. It is currently used mostly for football matches and is the home ground of CSM Focșani. The stadium's name comes from Milcov River and holds 8,500 people.
