= Fierbinți-Târg =

- Town
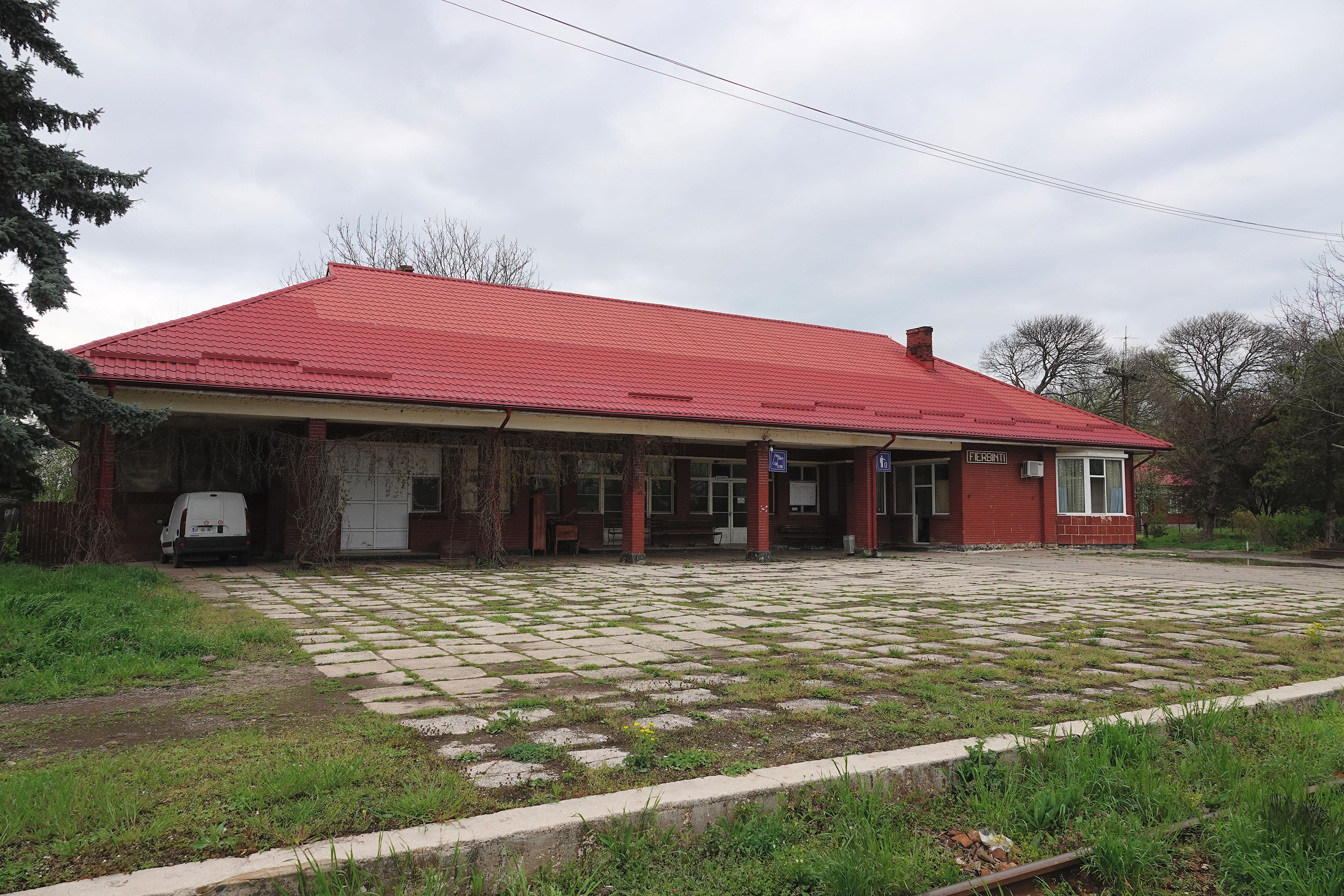
- Fierbinți-Târg train station

- Location in Ialomița County

- Location in Romania
- Coordinates: 44°41′N 26°23′E
- Country: Romania
- County: Ialomița

Government
  - Mayor (2024–2028): Iuksel Iusein (PSD)
- Area: 43 km^{2} (17 sq mi)
- Elevation: 80 m (260 ft)
- Population (2021-12-01): 4,620
  - Density: 110/km^{2} (280/sq mi)
- Time zone: UTC+02:00 (EET)
  - Summer (DST): UTC+03:00 (EEST)
- Postal code: 927115
- Area code: (+40) 02 43
- Vehicle reg.: IL
- Website: primariafierbinti.ro

Fierbinți-Târg is a town in Ialomița County, Muntenia, Romania. The town administers three villages: Fierbinții de Jos, Fierbinții de Sus, and Grecii de Jos.

The town is located in the western part of the county, bordering on Ilfov County. It is 27.6 km (17.1 mi) from Urziceni and 44.8 km (27.8 mi) from Bucharest.

The Fierbinți-Târg train station serves the CFR Main Line 700, which connects Bucharest to Brăila, Galați and the border with Moldova at Giurgiulești.

Las Fierbinți, one of Romania's best known television series, is filmed in the town.

Historical population
| Year | Pop. | ±% |
|---|---|---|
| 2002 | 5,253 | — |
| 2011 | 4,896 | −6.8% |
| 2021 | 4,620 | −5.6% |
Source: Census data

== Natives ==
- Florin Cazan (born 1997), footballer
