= Las Fierbinți =

- Genre: Sitcom
- Written by: Mimi Brănescu; Bogdan Mirică
- Directed by: Dragoș Buliga; Constantin Popescu
- Starring: Gheorghe Ifrim; Mihai Bobonete; Constantin Diță; Adrian Văncică; Leonid Doni
- Composer: Mihai Mărgineanu
- Country of origin: Romania
- Original language: Romanian
- No. of seasons: 30
- No. of episodes: 677

Production
- Executive producers: Emilia Vlad; Andrei Boncea; Cristina Dobrițoiu
- Running time: 50 minutes

Original release
- Network: Pro TV
- Release: March 1, 2012 - present

Las Fierbinți is a Romanian sitcom that premiered on Pro TV on March 1, 2012, created by Mimi Brănescu, and directed by Dragoș Buliga and Constantin Popescu.

Set in a rural place Fierbinți, the series follows the social and romantic lives of the inhabitants from this village. The most important people are the mayor and the bartender.

== Cast and characters ==
=== Main characters ===
- Vasile (Gheorghe Ifrim) is the mayor of Fierbinți.
- Bobiță (Mihai Bobonete) is the owner of the rural bar.
- Giani (Constantin Diță) is the town's stupid, born in Fierbinți, but moved for a while to Italy for work. He returned to his native places. Giani and Bobiță are best friends.
- Dorel (Mihai Rait Dragomir) is Bobiță's brother.
- Robi (Leonid Doni) is the chief policeman of the village.
- Rață (Marius Chivu) is the taxi driver of the village.
- Gianina (Anca Dumitra) is the daughter of the previous mayor.
- Brânzoi (Ionuț Ciocia) is a local villager.
- Dalida (Ecaterina Țugulea) is the mayor's personal assistant.
- Celentano (Adrian Văncică) is the biggest boozer from Fierbinți.
- Firicel (Toma Cuzin) is Celentano's best friend.
- Ardiles (Mihai Mărgineanu) town's thief, a friend of Celentano's and Firicel's.
- Aspirina (Mirela Oprișor) is the village prostitute.

== Reception ==
The pilot episode of the series brought the best audiences for a Romanian TV show in the last 10 years. It had an 11.6 rating and 25.4 share. The first episode of season 11 reportedly brought an audience of 2.1 million viewers.

== Series overview ==
| Season | Episodes | Originally released | |
| Season | Episodes | First released | Last released |
|---|---|---|---|
| 1 | 14 | March 1, 2012 | May 31, 2012 |
| 2 | 12 | September 27, 2012 | December 20, 2012 |
| 3 | 13 | February 28, 2013 | May 30, 2013 |
| 4 | 12 | October 3, 2013 | November 28, 2013 |
| 5 | 13 | February 13, 2014 | May 22, 2014 |
| 6 | 14 | October 2, 2014 | December 24, 2014 |
| 7 | 24 | March 11, 2015 | May 28, 2015 |
| 8 | 17 | September 17, 2015 | December 25, 2015 |
| 9 | 12 | February 25, 2016 | May 12, 2016 |
| 10 | 13 | September 15, 2016 | December 22, 2016 |
| 11 | 29 | February 22, 2017 | June 1, 2017 |
| 12 | 27 | September 12, 2017 | December 24, 2017 |
| 13 | 28 | February 27, 2018 | June 1, 2018 |
| 14 | 27 | September 11, 2018 | December 24, 2018 |
| 15 | 51 | January 29, 2019 | May 23, 2019 |
| 16 | 27 | September 10, 2019 | December 24, 2019 |
| 17 | 15 | February 4, 2020 | March 23, 2020 |
| 18 | 33 | September 7, 2020 | December 31, 2020 |
| 19 | 34 | February 2, 2021 | May 27, 2021 |

== Episodes ==
=== Season 1 ===
| No. overall | No. in season | Title | Directed by | Written by | Original release date |
|---|---|---|---|---|---|
| 1 | 1 | "Pilot" | Dragoș Buliga | Bogdan Mirică | March 1, 2012 |
| 2 | 2 | "Alegerile" | Dragoș Buliga & Constantin Popescu | Mimi Brănescu | March 8, 2012 |
| 3 | 3 | "Falcao" | Dragoș Buliga & Constantin Popescu | Mimi Brănescu | March 15, 2012 |
| 4 | 4 | "Suedezele" | Dragoș Buliga & Constantin Popescu | Mimi Brănescu | March 22, 2012 |
| 5 | 5 | "În copac" | Dragoș Buliga & Constantin Popescu | Mimi Brănescu | March 29, 2012 |
| 6 | 6 | "Miss Fierbinți" | Dragoș Buliga & Constantin Popescu | Mimi Brănescu | April 5, 2012 |
| 7 | 7 | "Aspirina" | Dragoș Buliga & Constantin Popescu | Mimi Brănescu | April 12, 2012 |
| 8 | 8 | "Nunta" | Dragoș Buliga & Constantin Popescu | Mimi Brănescu | April 19, 2012 |
| 9 | 9 | "Prefectul" | Dragoș Buliga & Constantin Popescu | Mimi Brănescu | April 26, 2012 |
| 10 | 10 | "Digul" | Dragoș Buliga & Constantin Popescu | Mimi Brănescu | May 3, 2012 |
| 11 | 11 | "Sexolette" | Dragoș Buliga & Constantin Popescu | Mimi Brănescu | May 10, 2012 |
| 12 | 12 | "Fuoco" | Dragoș Buliga & Constantin Popescu | Mimi Brănescu | May 17, 2012 |
| 13 | 13 | "Ciupacapra" | Dragoș Buliga & Constantin Popescu | Mimi Brănescu | May 24, 2012 |
| 14 | 14 | "Recordul" | Dragoș Buliga & Constantin Popescu | Mimi Brănescu | May 31, 2012 |

=== Season 2 ===
| No. overall | No. in season | Title | Directed by | Written by | Original release date |
|---|---|---|---|---|---|
| 15 | 1 | "Nunta" | Dragoș Buliga | Mimi Brănescu | September 27, 2012 |
| 16 | 2 | "Codu lui Davinciu" | Dragoș Buliga | Mimi Brănescu | September 27, 2012 |
| 17 | 3 | "Comisarul european" | Dragoș Buliga | Mimi Brănescu | October 4, 2012 |
| 18 | 4 | "Dinamul" | Dragoș Buliga | Mimi Brănescu | October 11, 2012 |
| 19 | 5 | "Amigo" | Dragoș Buliga | Mimi Brănescu | October 18, 2012 |
| 20 | 6 | "Nimfele" | Dragoș Buliga | Mimi Brănescu | October 25, 2012 |
| 21 | 7 | "Tabloul" | Dragoș Buliga | Mimi Brănescu | November 1, 2012 |
| 22 | 8 | "Amantul" | Dragoș Buliga | Mimi Brănescu | November 15, 2012 |
| 23 | 9 | "6 din 49" | Dragoș Buliga | Mimi Brănescu | November 22, 2012 |
| 24 | 10 | "Visul" | Dragoș Buliga | Mimi Brănescu | November 29, 2012 |
| 25 | 11 | "America" | Dragoș Buliga | Mimi Brănescu | December 13, 2012 |
| 26 | 12 | "Moș Crăciun" | Dragoș Buliga | Mimi Brănescu | December 20, 2012 |

=== Season 3 ===
| No. overall | No. in season | Title | Directed by | Written by | Original release date |
|---|---|---|---|---|---|
| 27 | 1 | "Turcul" | Dragoș Buliga | Mimi Brănescu | February 28, 2013 |
| 28 | 2 | "Biblioteconomul" | Dragoș Buliga | Mimi Brănescu | March 7, 2013 |
| 29 | 3 | "Principele" | Dragoș Buliga | Mimi Brănescu | March 21, 2013 |
| 30 | 4 | "Berzele" | Dragoș Buliga | Mimi Brănescu | March 28, 2013 |
| 31 | 5 | "Detectorul de minciuni" | Dragoș Buliga | Mimi Brănescu | April 4, 2013 |
| 32 | 6 | "Statuia" | Dragoș Buliga | Mimi Brănescu | April 11, 2013 |
| 33 | 7 | "Botezul" | Dragoș Buliga | Mimi Brănescu | April 18, 2013 |
| 34 | 8 | "Baroneasa" | Dragoș Buliga | Mimi Brănescu | April 25, 2013 |
| 35 | 9 | "Ursul" | Dragoș Buliga | Mimi Brănescu | May 2, 2013 |
| 36 | 10 | "Gelu" | Dragoș Buliga | Mimi Brănescu | May 9, 2013 |
| 37 | 11 | "Asigurarea" | Dragoș Buliga | Mimi Brănescu | May 16, 2013 |
| 38 | 12 | "Autostrada" | Dragoș Buliga | Mimi Brănescu | May 23, 2013 |
| 39 | 13 | "Ziua lui Robi" | Dragoș Buliga | Mimi Brănescu | May 30, 2013 |

=== Season 4 ===
| No. overall | No. in season | Title | Directed by | Written by | Original release date |
|---|---|---|---|---|---|
| 40 | 1 | "Vinetele" | Dragoș Buliga | Mimi Brănescu | October 3, 2013 |
| 41 | 2 | "Aspirina e gravidă (1)" | Dragoș Buliga | Mimi Brănescu | October 10, 2013 |
| 42 | 3 | "Aspirina e gravidă (2)" | Dragoș Buliga | Mimi Brănescu | October 10, 2013 |
| 43 | 4 | "Dalida primăreasă (1)" | Dragoș Buliga | Mimi Brănescu | October 17, 2013 |
| 44 | 5 | "Dalida primăreasă (2)" | Dragoș Buliga | Mimi Brănescu | October 17, 2013 |
| 45 | 6 | "Giani și familia lui (1)" | Dragoș Buliga | Mimi Brănescu | October 24, 2013 |
| 46 | 7 | "Giani și familia lui (2)" | Dragoș Buliga | Mimi Brănescu | October 24, 2013 |
| 47 | 8 | "Tatuajul" | Dragoș Buliga | Mimi Brănescu | November 14, 2013 |
| 48 | 9 | "Rodion" | Dragoș Buliga | Mimi Brănescu | November 14, 2013 |
| 49 | 10 | "Partidul comunist" | Dragoș Buliga | Mimi Brănescu | November 21, 2013 |
| 50 | 11 | "Regele fitness-ului" | Dragoș Buliga | Mimi Brănescu | November 21, 2013 |
| 51 | 12 | "Getuța" | Dragoș Buliga | Mimi Brănescu | November 28, 2013 |

=== Season 5 ===
| No. overall | No. in season | Title | Directed by | Written by | Original release date |
|---|---|---|---|---|---|
| 52 | 1 | "Mafiotul" | Dragoș Buliga | Mimi Brănescu | February 13, 2014 |
| 53 | 2 | "Coloana infinitului" | Dragoș Buliga | Mimi Brănescu | February 20, 2014 |
| 54 | 3 | "Semaforul" | Dragoș Buliga | Mimi Brănescu | February 27, 2014 |
| 55 | 4 | "Împrumutul" | Dragoș Buliga | Mimi Brănescu | March 6, 2014 |
| 56 | 5 | "Concursul de dans" | Dragoș Buliga | Mimi Brănescu | March 13, 2014 |
| 57 | 6 | "Schimb de neveste" | Dragoș Buliga | Mimi Brănescu | March 20, 2014 |
| 58 | 7 | "Ardiles îndrăgostit (partea I)" | Dragoș Buliga | Mimi Brănescu | April 3, 2014 |
| 59 | 8 | "Ardiles îndrăgostit (partea II)" | Dragoș Buliga | Mimi Brănescu | April 10, 2014 |
| 60 | 9 | "Femeia care plânge" | Dragoș Buliga | Mimi Brănescu | April 24, 2014 |
| 61 | 10 | "Poker" | Dragoș Buliga | Mimi Brănescu | May 1, 2014 |
| 62 | 11 | "Giani se însoară" | Dragoș Buliga | Mimi Brănescu | May 8, 2014 |
| 63 | 12 | "Vasile e demis" | Dragoș Buliga | Mimi Brănescu | May 15, 2014 |
| 64 | 13 | "Artă abstractă" | Dragoș Buliga | Mimi Brănescu | May 22, 2014 |

=== Season 6 ===
| No. overall | No. in season | Title | Directed by | Written by | Original release date |
|---|---|---|---|---|---|
| 65 | 1 | "Hildegun" | Dragoș Buliga | Mimi Brănescu | October 2, 2014 |
| 66 | 2 | "Italianul" | Dragoș Buliga | Mimi Brănescu | October 2, 2014 |
| 67 | 3 | "Milionarul (1)" | Dragoș Buliga | Mimi Brănescu | October 9, 2014 |
| 68 | 4 | "Milionarul (2)" | Dragoș Buliga | Mimi Brănescu | October 9, 2014 |
| 69 | 5 | "Celentano îndrăgostit" | Dragoș Buliga | Mimi Brănescu | October 16, 2014 |
| 70 | 6 | "Swingerii" | Dragoș Buliga | Mimi Brănescu | October 16, 2014 |
| 71 | 7 | "Iluminati (1)" | Dragoș Buliga | Mimi Brănescu | October 23, 2014 |
| 72 | 8 | "Iluminati (2)" | Dragoș Buliga | Mimi Brănescu | October 23, 2014 |
| 73 | 9 | "Robi pleacă în Dubai" | Dragoș Buliga | Mimi Brănescu | October 30, 2014 |
| 74 | 10 | "Veganii" | Dragoș Buliga | Mimi Brănescu | November 6, 2014 |
| 75 | 11 | "Barul, Bancul si Escroaca (1)" | Dragoș Buliga | Mimi Brănescu | November 13, 2014 |
| 76 | 12 | "Barul, Bancul si Escroaca (2)" | Dragoș Buliga | Mimi Brănescu | November 13, 2014 |
| 77 | 13 | "Duelul Giani vs Robi" | Dragoș Buliga | Mimi Brănescu | November 20, 2014 |
| 78 | 14 | "Episod special de Crăciun" | Dragoș Buliga | Mimi Brănescu | December 24, 2014 |

=== Season 7 ===
| No. overall | No. in season | Title | Directed by | Written by | Original release date |
|---|---|---|---|---|---|
| 78 | 1 | "Minunea (1)" | Dragoș Buliga | Mimi Brănescu | March 11, 2015 |
| 79 | 2 | "Minunea (2)" | Dragoș Buliga | Mimi Brănescu | March 12, 2015 |
| 80 | 3 | "Clarvăzătoarea (1)" | Dragoș Buliga | Mimi Brănescu | March 18, 2015 |
| 81 | 4 | "Clarvăzătoarea (2)" | Dragoș Buliga | Mimi Brănescu | March 19, 2015 |
| 82 | 5 | "Dorel e "ghei" ? (1)" | Dragoș Buliga | Mimi Brănescu | March 25, 2015 |
| 83 | 6 | "Dorel e "ghei" ? (2)" | Dragoș Buliga | Mimi Brănescu | March 26, 2015 |
| 84 | 7 | "Stand-up (1)" | Dragoș Buliga | Mimi Brănescu | March 31, 2015 |
| 85 | 8 | "Stand-up (2)" | Dragoș Buliga | Mimi Brănescu | April 1, 2015 |
| 86 | 9 | "Crima (1)" | Dragoș Buliga | Mimi Brănescu | April 8, 2015 |
| 87 | 10 | "Crima (2)" | Dragoș Buliga | Mimi Brănescu | April 9, 2015 |
| 88 | 11 | "Vărul Aurel (1)" | Dragoș Buliga | Mimi Brănescu | April 15, 2015 |
| 89 | 12 | "Vărul Aurel (2)" | Dragoș Buliga | Mimi Brănescu | April 16, 2015 |
| 90 | 13 | "Giani milionar (1)" | Dragoș Buliga | Mimi Brănescu | April 22, 2015 |
| 91 | 14 | "Giani milionar (2)" | Dragoș Buliga | Mimi Brănescu | April 23, 2015 |
| 92 | 15 | "Gianina studentă (1)" | Dragoș Buliga | Mimi Brănescu | April 29, 2015 |
| 93 | 16 | "Gianina studentă (2)" | Dragoș Buliga | Mimi Brănescu | April 30, 2015 |
| 94 | 17 | "Tombola (1)" | Dragoș Buliga | Mimi Brănescu | May 6, 2015 |
| 95 | 18 | "Tombola (2)" | Dragoș Buliga | Mimi Brănescu | May 7, 2015 |
| 96 | 19 | "Efbiaiu' (1)" | Dragoș Buliga | Mimi Brănescu | May 13, 2015 |
| 97 | 20 | "Efbiaiu' (2)" | Dragoș Buliga | Mimi Brănescu | May 14, 2015 |
| 98 | 21 | "A șaptea artă (1)" | Dragoș Buliga | Mimi Brănescu | May 20, 2015 |
| 99 | 22 | "A șaptea artă (2)" | Dragoș Buliga | Mimi Brănescu | May 21, 2015 |
| 100 | 23 | "Vine Iohannis (1)" | Dragoș Buliga | Mimi Brănescu | May 26, 2015 |
| 101 | 24 | "Vine Iohannis (2)" | Dragoș Buliga | Mimi Brănescu | May 28, 2015 |

=== Season 8 ===
| No. overall | No. in season | Title | Directed by | Written by | Original release date |
|---|---|---|---|---|---|
| 102 | 1 | "Vampirul (1)" | Dragoș Buliga | Mimi Brănescu | September 17, 2015 |
| 103 | 2 | "Vampirul (2)" | Dragoș Buliga | Mimi Brănescu | September 17, 2015 |
| 104 | 3 | "Japonezii și Fausta (1)" | Dragoș Buliga | Mimi Brănescu | October 1, 2015 |
| 105 | 4 | "Japonezii și Fausta (2)" | Dragoș Buliga | Mimi Brănescu | October 1, 2015 |
| 106 | 5 | "Gianina profesoară (1)" | Dragoș Buliga | Mimi Brănescu | October 8, 2015 |
| 107 | 6 | "Gianina profesoară (2)" | Dragoș Buliga | Mimi Brănescu | October 8, 2015 |
| 108 | 7 | "Punctul GE (1)" | Dragoș Buliga | Mimi Brănescu | October 15, 2015 |
| 109 | 8 | "Punctul GE (2)" | Dragoș Buliga | Mimi Brănescu | October 15, 2015 |
| 110 | 9 | "TAXI Power (1)" | Dragoș Buliga | Mimi Brănescu | October 22, 2015 |
| 111 | 10 | "TAXI Power (2)" | Dragoș Buliga | Mimi Brănescu | October 22, 2015 |
| 112 | 11 | "Felix Tangoh (1)" | Dragoș Buliga | Mimi Brănescu | October 29, 2015 |
| 113 | 12 | "Felix Tangoh (2)" | Dragoș Buliga | Mimi Brănescu | October 29, 2015 |
| 114 | 13 | "Agro-golful (1)" | Dragoș Buliga | Mimi Brănescu | November 5, 2015 |
| 115 | 14 | "Agro-golful (2)" | Dragoș Buliga | Mimi Brănescu | November 5, 2015 |
| 116 | 15 | "Babele și Gigolo (1)" | Dragoș Buliga | Mimi Brănescu | November 12, 2015 |
| 117 | 16 | "Babele și Gigolo (2)" | Dragoș Buliga | Mimi Brănescu | November 12, 2015 |
| 118 | 17 | "De Crăciun" | Dragoș Buliga | Mimi Brănescu | December 25, 2015 |

=== Season 9 ===
| No. overall | No. in season | Title | Directed by | Written by | Original release date |
|---|---|---|---|---|---|
| 119 | 1 | "Robi Senzualu' (1)" | Dragoș Buliga | Mimi Brănescu | February 25, 2016 |
| 120 | 2 | "Robi Senzualu' (2)" | Dragoș Buliga | Mimi Brănescu | February 25, 2016 |
| 121 | 3 | "Dulapul Aspirinei (1)" | Dragoș Buliga | Mimi Brănescu | March 10, 2016 |
| 122 | 4 | "Dulapul Aspirinei (2)" | Dragoș Buliga | Mimi Brănescu | March 17, 2016 |
| 123 | 5 | "Colacao (1)" | Dragoș Buliga | Mimi Brănescu | March 24, 2016 |
| 124 | 6 | "Colacao (2)" | Dragoș Buliga | Mimi Brănescu | March 31, 2016 |
| 125 | 7 | "Calu' Lu' Dorel (1)" | Dragoș Buliga | Mimi Brănescu | April 7, 2016 |
| 126 | 8 | "Calu' Lu' Dorel (2)" | Dragoș Buliga | Mimi Brănescu | April 14, 2016 |
| 127 | 9 | "Cetățeanul de onoare (1)" | Dragoș Buliga | Mimi Brănescu | April 21, 2016 |
| 128 | 10 | "Cetățeanul de onoare (2)" | Dragoș Buliga | Mimi Brănescu | April 28, 2016 |
| 129 | 11 | "Ajutor social (1)" | Dragoș Buliga | Mimi Brănescu | May 5, 2016 |
| 130 | 12 | "Ajutor social (2)" | Dragoș Buliga | Mimi Brănescu | May 12, 2016 |

=== Season 10 ===
| No. overall | No. in season | Title | Directed by | Written by | Original release date |
|---|---|---|---|---|---|
| 131 | 1 | "Lia, stilul și comoara (1)" | Dragoș Buliga | Iulian Postelnicu | September 15, 2016 |
| 132 | 2 | "Lia, stilul și comoara (2)" | Dragoș Buliga | Iulian Postelnicu | September 22, 2016 |
| 133 | 3 | "Antrenorul (1)" | Dragoș Buliga | Dan Panaet | September 29, 2016 |
| 134 | 4 | "Antrenorul (2)" | Dragoș Buliga | Dan Panaet | October 6, 2016 |
| 135 | 5 | "Petrolul" | Dragoș Buliga | Dan Panaet | October 13, 2016 |
| 136 | 6 | "Harta spre rai" | Dragoș Buliga | Adrian Văncică | October 27, 2016 |
| 137 | 7 | "Femei, Femei (1)" | Dragoș Buliga | Adrian Văncică | November 3, 2016 |
| 138 | 8 | "Femei, Femei (2)" | Dragoș Buliga | Adrian Văncică | November 10, 2016 |
| 139 | 9 | "Sinucigașul" | Dragoș Buliga | Iulian Postelnicu | November 17, 2016 |
| 140 | 10 | "Marea Petrecere Națională" | Dragoș Buliga | Mihai Bobonete & Adrian Văncică | December 1, 2016 |
| 141 | 11 | "Angela și Sfântul (1)" | Dragoș Buliga | Iulian Postelnicu | December 8, 2016 |
| 142 | 12 | "Angela și Sfântul (2)" | Dragoș Buliga | Iulian Postelnicu | December 15, 2016 |
| 143 | 13 | "De Crăciun" | Dragoș Buliga | Mihai Bobonete & Adrian Văncică | December 22, 2016 |

=== Season 11 ===
| No. overall | No. in season | Title | Directed by | Written by | Original release date |
|---|---|---|---|---|---|
| 144 | 1 | "Bună, vrei o gumă? (1)" | Dragoș Buliga | Adrian Văncică | February 22, 2017 |
| 145 | 2 | "Bună, vrei o gumă? (2)" | Dragoș Buliga | Adrian Văncică | February 23, 2017 |
| 146 | 3 | "Inventatorii (1)" | Dragoș Buliga | Adrian Văncică | March 1, 2017 |
| 147 | 4 | "Inventatorii (2)" | Dragoș Buliga | Adrian Văncică | March 2, 2017 |
| 148 | 5 | "FIFI, dracul și Tatiana (1)" | Dragoș Buliga | Iulian Postelnicu | March 8, 2017 |
| 149 | 6 | "FIFI, dracul și Tatiana (2)" | Dragoș Buliga | Iulian Postelnicu | March 9, 2017 |
| 150 | 7 | "Capra, șpaga și frizerul (1)" | Dragoș Buliga | Iulian Postelnicu | March 15, 2017 |
| 151 | 8 | "Capra, șpaga și frizerul (2)" | Dragoș Buliga | Iulian Postelnicu | March 16, 2017 |
| 152 | 9 | "Ce este viața? (1)" | Dragoș Buliga | Adrian Văncică | March 22, 2017 |
| 153 | 10 | "Ce este viața? (2)" | Dragoș Buliga | Adrian Văncică | March 23, 2017 |
| 154 | 11 | "Teroriștii (1)" | Dragoș Buliga | Adrian Văncică | March 29, 2017 |
| 155 | 12 | "Teroriștii (2)" | Dragoș Buliga | Adrian Văncică | March 30, 2017 |
| 156 | 13 | "Laserul (1)" | Dragoș Buliga | Dan Panaet | April 5, 2017 |
| 157 | 14 | "Laserul (2)" | Dragoș Buliga | Dan Panaet | April 6, 2017 |
| 158 | 15 | "Picăturile" | Dragoș Buliga | Adrian Văncică | April 12, 2017 |
| 159 | 16 | "Magicianul" | Dragoș Buliga | Dan Panaet | April 13, 2017 |
| 160 | 17 | "Eroul și Thailanda (1)" | Dragoș Buliga | Adrian Văncică | April 19, 2017 |
| 161 | 18 | "Eroul și Thailanda (2)" | Dragoș Buliga | Adrian Văncică | April 20, 2017 |
| 162 | 19 | "Spionul (1)" | Dragoș Buliga | Dan Panaet | April 26, 2017 |
| 163 | 20 | "Spionul (2)" | Dragoș Buliga | Dan Panaet | April 27, 2017 |
| 164 | 21 | "Groparul (1)" | Dragoș Buliga | Adrian Văncică | May 3, 2017 |
| 165 | 22 | "Groparul (2)" | Dragoș Buliga | Adrian Văncică | May 4, 2017 |
| 166 | 23 | "Vulpea (1)" | Dragoș Buliga | Iulian Postelnicu | May 10, 2017 |
| 167 | 24 | "Vulpea (2)" | Dragoș Buliga | Iulian Postelnicu | May 11, 2017 |
| 168 | 25 | "America și Groapa Marianelor (1)" | Dragoș Buliga | Mihai Bobonete | May 17, 2017 |
| 169 | 26 | "America și Groapa Marianelor (2)" | Dragoș Buliga | Mihai Bobonete | May 18, 2017 |
| 170 | 27 | "Eforie 2000 (1)" | Dragoş Buliga | Iulian Postelnicu | May 24, 2017 |
| 171 | 28 | "Eforie 2000 (2)" | Dragoş Buliga | Iulian Postelnicu | May 25, 2017 |
| 172 | 29 | "Spaidăr Men" | Dragoş Buliga | Leonid Doni | June 1, 2017 |

=== Season 12 ===
| No. overall | No. in season | Title | Directed by | Written by | Original release date |
|---|---|---|---|---|---|
| 173 | 1 | "Sfârşitul Lumii" | Dragoș Buliga & Gabriel Achim | Dan Panaet | September 12, 2017 |
| 174 | 2 | "Luminița" | Dragoș Buliga & Gabriel Achim | Iulian Postelnicu | September 13, 2017 |
| 175 | 3 | "Porumbelul Păcii" | Dragoș Buliga & Gabriel Achim | Iulian Postelnicu | September 19, 2017 |
| 176 | 4 | "A Murit Rozina" | Dragoș Buliga & Gabriel Achim | Adrian Văncică | September 21, 2017 |
| 177 | 5 | "Cerşetorul" | Dragoș Buliga & Gabriel Achim | Mihai Radu | September 26, 2017 |
| 178 | 6 | "Piramida lui Keops" | Dragoș Buliga & Gabriel Achim | Leonid Doni | October 3, 2017 |
| 179 | 7 | "Colegul de armată" | Dragoș Buliga & Gabriel Achim | Leonid Doni | October 5, 2017 |
| 180 | 8 | "Varicela (1)" | Dragoș Buliga & Gabriel Achim | Adrian Văncică | October 10, 2017 |
| 181 | 9 | "Varicela (2)" | Dragoș Buliga & Gabriel Achim | Adrian Văncică | October 12, 2017 |
| 182 | 10 | "Fridăm" | Dragoș Buliga & Gabriel Achim | Leonid Doni & Iulian Postelnicu | October 17, 2017 |
| 183 | 11 | "Cosmonautul (1)" | Dragoș Buliga & Gabriel Achim | Adrian Văncică | October 24, 2017 |
| 184 | 12 | "Cosmonautul (2)" | Dragoș Buliga & Gabriel Achim | Adrian Văncică | October 26, 2017 |
| 185 | 13 | "Mama natură (1)" | Dragoș Buliga & Gabriel Achim | Adrian Văncică | October 30, 2017 |
| 186 | 14 | "Mama natură (2)" | Dragoș Buliga & Gabriel Achim | Adrian Văncică | November 2, 2017 |
| 187 | 15 | "Cursa" | Dragoș Buliga & Gabriel Achim | Leonid Doni & Iulian Postelnicu | November 7, 2017 |
| 188 | 16 | "Zsuzsanna Ziad" | Dragoș Buliga & Gabriel Achim | Leonid Doni & Iulian Postelnicu | November 14, 2017 |
| 189 | 17 | "Fălci" | Dragoș Buliga & Gabriel Achim | Leonid Doni & Iulian Postelnicu | November 16, 2017 |
| 190 | 18 | "Rețeaua" | Dragoș Buliga & Gabriel Achim | Adina Zota | November 21, 2017 |
| 191 | 19 | "Zacusca" | Dragoș Buliga & Gabriel Achim | Adrian Văncică | November 28, 2017 |
| 192 | 20 | "Ucenicii lui Celentano" | Dragoș Buliga & Gabriel Achim | Dan Panaet | November 30, 2017 |
| 193 | 21 | "Evaluarea" | Dragoș Buliga & Gabriel Achim | Leonid Doni & Iulian Postelnicu | December 5, 2017 |
| 194 | 22 | "Ceasul Biologic" | Dragoș Buliga & Gabriel Achim | Dragoș Mușat | December 7, 2017 |
| 195 | 23 | "Testul de inteligență (1)" | Dragoș Buliga & Gabriel Achim | Dan Panaet | December 11, 2017 |
| 196 | 24 | "Testul de inteligență (2)" | Dragoș Buliga & Gabriel Achim | Dan Panaet | December 12, 2017 |
| 197 | 25 | "Un Leu (1)" | Dragoș Buliga & Gabriel Achim | Adrian Văncică | December 13, 2017 |
| 198 | 26 | "Un Leu (2)" | Dragoș Buliga & Gabriel Achim | Adrian Văncică | December 13, 2017 |
| 199 | 27 | "Ajunul Crăciunului" | Dragoș Buliga & Gabriel Achim | Mimi Brănescu | December 24, 2017 |

=== Season 13 ===
| No. overall | No. in season | Title | Directed by | Written by | Original release date |
|---|---|---|---|---|---|
| 200 | 1 | "Cavalerii de Logan (1)" | Dragoș Buliga & Gabriel Achim | Mimi Brănescu | February 27, 2018 |
| 201 | 2 | "Cavalerii de Logan (2)" | Dragoș Buliga & Gabriel Achim | Mimi Brănescu | March 6, 2018 |
| 202 | 3 | "Impresarul" | Dragoș Buliga & Gabriel Achim | Mimi Brănescu | March 8, 2018 |
| 203 | 4 | "Papagalul" | Dragoș Buliga & Gabriel Achim | Mimi Brănescu | March 13, 2018 |
| 204 | 5 | "Pamela se întoarce" | Dragoș Buliga & Gabriel Achim | Mimi Brănescu | March 15, 2018 |
| 205 | 6 | "Hipsterii" | Dragoș Buliga & Gabriel Achim | Mimi Brănescu | March 20, 2018 |
| 206 | 7 | "Zombiu_Samuraiu_1979" | Dragoș Buliga & Gabriel Achim | Mimi Brănescu | March 22, 2018 |
| 207 | 8 | "Moțul Fără Dar (1)" | Dragoș Buliga & Gabriel Achim | Mimi Brănescu | March 27, 2018 |
| 208 | 9 | "Moțul Fără Dar (2)" | Dragoș Buliga & Gabriel Achim | Mimi Brănescu | March 29, 2018 |
| 209 | 10 | "Hoțul de Biciclete (1)" | Dragoș Buliga & Gabriel Achim | Mimi Brănescu | April 3, 2018 |
| 210 | 11 | "Hoțul de Biciclete (2)" | Dragoș Buliga & Gabriel Achim | Mimi Brănescu | April 5, 2018 |
| 211 | 12 | "Fengşui" | Dragoș Buliga & Gabriel Achim | Mimi Brănescu | April 10, 2018 |
| 212 | 13 | "Nisipurile de Aur" | Dragoș Buliga & Gabriel Achim | Mimi Brănescu | April 12, 2018 |
| 213 | 14 | "Vânătorul de Strigoi (1)" | Dragoș Buliga & Gabriel Achim | Mimi Brănescu | April 17, 2018 |
| 214 | 15 | "Vânătorul de Strigoi (2)" | Dragoș Buliga & Gabriel Achim | Mimi Brănescu | April 19, 2018 |
| 215 | 16 | "Goluța şi Maimuța (1)" | Dragoș Buliga & Gabriel Achim | Mimi Brănescu | April 24, 2018 |
| 216 | 17 | "Goluța şi Maimuța (2)" | Dragoș Buliga & Gabriel Achim | Mimi Brănescu | April 26, 2018 |
| 217 | 18 | "Cindarella (1)" | Dragoș Buliga & Gabriel Achim | Mimi Brănescu | May 1, 2018 |
| 218 | 19 | "Cindarella (2)" | Dragoș Buliga & Gabriel Achim | Mimi Brănescu | May 3, 2018 |
| 219 | 20 | "Alfredo (1)" | Dragoș Buliga & Gabriel Achim | Mimi Brănescu | May 8, 2018 |
| 220 | 21 | "Alfredo (2)" | Dragoș Buliga & Gabriel Achim | Mimi Brănescu | May 10, 2018 |
| 221 | 22 | "Full HD (1)" | Dragoș Buliga & Gabriel Achim | Mimi Brănescu | May 15, 2018 |
| 222 | 23 | "Full HD (2)" | Dragoș Buliga & Gabriel Achim | Mimi Brănescu | May 17, 2018 |
| 223 | 24 | "Şmecherezu' (1)" | Dragoș Buliga & Gabriel Achim | Mimi Brănescu | May 22, 2018 |
| 224 | 25 | "Şmecherezu' (2)" | Dragoș Buliga & Gabriel Achim | Mimi Brănescu | May 24, 2018 |
| 225 | 26 | "Bine, Bro! (1)" | Dragoș Buliga & Gabriel Achim | Mimi Brănescu | May 29, 2018 |
| 226 | 27 | "Bine, Bro! (2)" | Dragoș Buliga & Gabriel Achim | Mimi Brănescu | May 31, 2018 |
| 227 | 28 | "Numai aia după aia" | Dragoș Buliga & Gabriel Achim | Mimi Brănescu | June 1, 2018 |

=== Season 14 ===
| No. overall | No. in season | Title | Directed by | Written by | Original release date |
|---|---|---|---|---|---|
| 228 | 1 | "Criza după 40 (1)" | Dragoş Buliga & Gabriel Achim | Adrian Văncică & Bogdan Mureșanu | September 11, 2018 |
| 229 | 2 | "Criza după 40 (2)" | Dragoş Buliga & Gabriel Achim | Adrian Văncică | September 13, 2018 |
| 230 | 3 | "Ziua lui Brânzoi (1)" | Dragoş Buliga & Gabriel Achim | Mimi Brănescu | September 18, 2018 |
| 231 | 4 | "Ziua lui Brânzoi (2)" | Dragoş Buliga & Gabriel Achim | Mimi Brănescu | September 20, 2018 |
| 232 | 5 | "Tigrul şi pupăza (1)" | Dragoş Buliga & Gabriel Achim | Adrian Văncică | September 25, 2018 |
| 233 | 6 | "Tigrul şi pupăza (2)" | Dragoş Buliga & Gabriel Achim | Adrian Văncică | September 27, 2018 |
| 234 | 7 | "Buchetul de mireasă (1)" | Dragoş Buliga & Gabriel Achim | Mimi Brănescu | October 2, 2018 |
| 235 | 8 | "Buchetul de mireasă (2)" | Dragoş Buliga & Gabriel Achim | Mimi Brănescu | October 4, 2018 |
| 236 | 9 | "Carnetul de securist (1)" | Dragoş Buliga & Gabriel Achim | Mimi Brănescu | October 9, 2018 |
| 237 | 10 | "Carnetul de securist (2)" | Dragoş Buliga & Gabriel Achim | Mimi Brănescu | October 11, 2018 |
| 238 | 11 | "Robi și șpaga (1)" | Dragoş Buliga & Gabriel Achim | Mimi Brănescu | October 16, 2018 |
| 239 | 12 | "Robi și șpaga (2)" | Dragoş Buliga & Gabriel Achim | Mimi Brănescu | October 18, 2018 |
| 240 | 13 | "Stop Buling (1)" | Dragoş Buliga & Gabriel Achim | Mimi Brănescu | October 23, 2018 |
| 241 | 14 | "Stop Buling (2)" | Dragoş Buliga & Gabriel Achim | Mimi Brănescu | October 25, 2018 |
| 242 | 15 | "Dorel Milionarul (1)" | Dragoş Buliga & Gabriel Achim | Mimi Brănescu | October 30, 2018 |
| 243 | 16 | "Dorel Milionarul (2)" | Dragoş Buliga & Gabriel Achim | Mimi Brănescu | November 1, 2018 |
| 244 | 17 | "Gușterii lu` Rață (1)" | Dragoş Buliga & Gabriel Achim | Mimi Brănescu | November 6, 2018 |
| 245 | 18 | "Gușterii lu` Rață (2)" | Dragoş Buliga & Gabriel Achim | Mimi Brănescu | November 8, 2018 |
| 246 | 19 | "Vasile Misionarul (1)" | Dragoş Buliga & Gabriel Achim | Mimi Brănescu | November 13, 2018 |
| 247 | 20 | "Vasile Misionarul (2)" | Dragoş Buliga & Gabriel Achim | Mimi Brănescu | November 15, 2018 |
| 248 | 21 | "Cadoul" | Gabriel Achim & Dragoș Buliga | Leonid Doni | November 20, 2018 |
| 249 | 22 | "Ceasul rău, găina neagră!" | Gabriel Achim & Dragoș Buliga | Leonid Doni | November 22, 2018 |
| 250 | 23 | "Rață Finlandezu` (1)" | Gabriel Achim & Dragoș Buliga | Mimi Brănescu | November 27, 2018 |
| 251 | 24 | "Rață Finlandezu` (2)" | Gabriel Achim & Dragoș Buliga | Mimi Brănescu | November 29, 2018 |
| 252 | 25 | "Omega și Pehașu` (1)" | Gabriel Achim & Dragoș Buliga | Mimi Brănescu | December 4, 2018 |
| 253 | 26 | "Omega și Pehașu` (2)" | Gabriel Achim & Dragoș Buliga | Mimi Brănescu | December 6, 2018 |
| 254 | 27 | "Ediție Specială de Crăciun" | Gabriel Achim & Dragoș Buliga | Adrian Văncică | December 24, 2018 |

=== Season 15 ===
| No. overall | No. in season | Title | Directed by | Written by | Original release date |
|---|---|---|---|---|---|
| 255 | 1 | "Concediul (1)" | Gabriel Achim & Dragoș Buliga | Dan Panaet | January 29, 2019 |
| 256 | 2 | "Concediul (2)" | Gabriel Achim & Dragoș Buliga | Dan Panaet | January 30, 2019 |
| 257 | 3 | "Burebista" | Gabriel Achim & Dragoș Buliga | Leonid Doni | January 31, 2019 |
| 258 | 4 | "Moaștele lui Kamasutra (1)" | Gabriel Achim & Dragoș Buliga | Mihai Bobonete & Mihai Rait | February 5, 2019 |
| 259 | 5 | "Moaștele lui Kamasutra (2)" | Gabriel Achim & Dragoș Buliga | Mihai Bobonete & Mihai Rait | February 6, 2019 |
| 260 | 6 | "Cascadorii" | Gabriel Achim & Dragoș Buliga | Leonid Doni | February 7, 2019 |
| 261 | 7 | "Pensionarul (1)" | Gabriel Achim & Dragoș Buliga | Dan Panaet | February 12, 2019 |
| 262 | 8 | "Pensionarul (2)" | Gabriel Achim & Dragoș Buliga | Dan Panaet | February 13, 2019 |
| 263 | 9 | "Lecția de italiană" | Gabriel Achim & Dragoș Buliga | Dan Panaet | February 14, 2019 |
| 264 | 10 | "Floare de colț (1)" | Gabriel Achim & Dragoș Buliga | Adrian Văncică | February 19, 2019 |
| 265 | 11 | "Floare de colț (2)" | Gabriel Achim & Dragoș Buliga | Adrian Văncică | February 20, 2019 |
| 266 | 12 | "Floare de colț (3)" | Gabriel Achim & Dragoș Buliga | Adrian Văncică | February 21, 2019 |
| 267 | 13 | "Pistolarii (1)" | Gabriel Achim & Dragoș Buliga | Dan Panaet | February 26, 2019 |
| 268 | 14 | "Pistolarii (2)" | Gabriel Achim & Dragoș Buliga | Dan Panaet | February 27, 2019 |
| 269 | 15 | "Crema" | Gabriel Achim & Dragoș Buliga | Leonid Doni & Iulian Postelnicu | February 28, 2019 |
| 270 | 16 | "Visuri la cheie (1)" | Gabriel Achim & Dragoș Buliga | Leonid Doni & Iulian Postelnicu | March 5, 2019 |
| 271 | 17 | "Visuri la cheie (2)" | Gabriel Achim & Dragoș Buliga | Leonid Doni & Iulian Postelnicu | March 6, 2019 |
| 272 | 18 | "Șoarecii" | Gabriel Achim & Dragoș Buliga | Leonid Doni & Iulian Postelnicu | March 7, 2019 |
| 273 | 19 | "Mona, Pastorul și Diploma (1)" | Gabriel Achim & Dragoș Buliga | Adrian Văncică | March 12, 2019 |
| 274 | 20 | "Mona, Pastorul și Diploma (2)" | Gabriel Achim & Dragoș Buliga | Adrian Văncică | March 13, 2019 |
| 275 | 21 | "Trofeul" | Gabriel Achim & Dragoș Buliga | Leonid Doni & Iulian Postelnicu | March 14, 2019 |
| 276 | 22 | "Chelia (1)" | Gabriel Achim & Dragoș Buliga | Adrian Văncică | March 19, 2019 |
| 277 | 23 | "Chelia (2)" | Gabriel Achim & Dragoș Buliga | Adrian Văncică | March 20, 2019 |
| 278 | 24 | "Șmecherul" | Gabriel Achim & Dragoș Buliga | Leonid Doni & Iulian Postelnicu | March 21, 2019 |
| 279 | 25 | "Țara ciorapilor (1)" | Gabriel Achim & Dragoș Buliga | Adrian Văncică | March 26, 2019 |
| 280 | 26 | "Țara ciorapilor (2)" | Gabriel Achim & Dragoș Buliga | Adrian Văncică | March 27, 2019 |
| 281 | 27 | ""Ce face" băieții?" | Gabriel Achim & Dragoș Buliga | Adrian Văncică | March 28, 2019 |
| 282 | 28 | "Meciul (1)" | Gabriel Achim & Dragoș Buliga | Leonid Doni & Iulian Postelnicu | April 2, 2019 |
| 283 | 29 | "Meciul (2)" | Gabriel Achim & Dragoș Buliga | Leonid Doni & Iulian Postelnicu | April 3, 2019 |
| 284 | 30 | "Cavoul" | Gabriel Achim & Dragoș Buliga | Dan Panaet | April 4, 2019 |
| 285 | 31 | "Gianibal (1)" | Gabriel Achim & Dragoș Buliga | Dan Panaet | April 9, 2019 |
| 286 | 32 | "Gianibal (2)" | Gabriel Achim & Dragoș Buliga | Dan Panaet | April 10, 2019 |
| 287 | 33 | "Pianistul" | Gabriel Achim & Dragoș Buliga | Leonid Doni & Iulian Postelnicu | April 11, 2019 |
| 288 | 34 | "O clipă de eternitate (1)" | Gabriel Achim & Dragoș Buliga | Mimi Brănescu | April 16, 2019 |
| 289 | 35 | "O clipă de eternitate (2)" | Gabriel Achim & Dragoș Buliga | Mimi Brănescu | April 17, 2019 |
| 290 | 36 | "O clipă de eternitate (3)" | Gabriel Achim & Dragoș Buliga | Mimi Brănescu | April 18, 2019 |
| 291 | 37 | "Jaf armat (1)" | Gabriel Achim & Dragoș Buliga | Mihai Bobonete | April 23, 2019 |
| 292 | 38 | "Jaf armat (2)" | Gabriel Achim & Dragoș Buliga | Mihai Bobonete | April 24, 2019 |
| 293 | 39 | "Dalida se mărită" | Gabriel Achim & Dragoș Buliga | Mimi Brănescu | April 25, 2019 |
| 294 | 40 | "Virginul, usturoiul & cârnații (1)" | Gabriel Achim & Dragoș Buliga | Adrian Văncică | April 30, 2019 |
| 295 | 41 | "Virginul, usturoiul & cârnații (2)" | Gabriel Achim & Dragoș Buliga | Adrian Văncică | May 1, 2019 |
| 296 | 42 | "Parașutiștii" | Gabriel Achim & Dragoș Buliga | Leonid Doni & Iulian Postelnicu | May 2, 2019 |
| 297 | 43 | "Panoul electoral (1)" | Gabriel Achim & Dragoș Buliga | Mimi Brănescu | May 7, 2019 |
| 298 | 44 | "Panoul electoral (2)" | Gabriel Achim & Dragoș Buliga | Mimi Brănescu | May 8, 2019 |
| 299 | 45 | "Panoul electoral (3)" | Gabriel Achim & Dragoș Buliga | Mimi Brănescu | May 9, 2019 |
| 300 | 46 | "Parcul de distracții (1)" | Gabriel Achim & Dragoș Buliga | Dragoș Mușat | May 14, 2019 |
| 301 | 47 | "Parcul de distracții (2)" | Gabriel Achim & Dragoș Buliga | Dragoș Mușat | May 15, 2019 |
| 302 | 48 | "Miss Ialomița" | Gabriel Achim & Dragoș Buliga | Leonid Doni & Iulian Postelnicu | May 16, 2019 |
| 303 | 49 | "La cules de râme (1)" | Gabriel Achim & Dragoș Buliga | Mimi Brănescu | May 21, 2019 |
| 304 | 50 | "La cules de râme (2)" | Gabriel Achim & Dragoș Buliga | Mimi Brănescu | May 22, 2019 |
| 305 | 51 | "La cules de râme (3)" | Gabriel Achim & Dragoș Buliga | Mimi Brănescu | May 23, 2019 |

=== Season 16 ===
| No. overall | No. in season | Title | Directed by | Written by | Original release date |
|---|---|---|---|---|---|
| 306 | 1 | "Robi miliardarul (1)" | Gabriel Achim & Dragoș Buliga | Mimi Brănescu | September 10, 2019 |
| 307 | 2 | "Robi miliardarul (2)" | Gabriel Achim & Dragoș Buliga | Mimi Brănescu | September 12, 2019 |
| 308 | 3 | "Robi miliardarul (3)" | Gabriel Achim & Dragoș Buliga | Mimi Brănescu | September 17, 2019 |
| 309 | 4 | "Testamentul" | Gabriel Achim & Dragoș Buliga | Leonid Doni | September 19, 2019 |
| 310 | 5 | "Ce-ai făcut Bobiță (1)" | Gabriel Achim & Dragoș Buliga | Mimi Brănescu | September 24, 2019 |
| 311 | 6 | "Ce-ai făcut Bobiță (2)" | Gabriel Achim & Dragoș Buliga | Mimi Brănescu | September 26, 2019 |
| 312 | 7 | "Știu ce-ai făcut aseară (1)" | Gabriel Achim & Dragoș Buliga | Adrian Văncică | October 1, 2019 |
| 313 | 8 | "Știu ce-ai făcut aseară (2)" | Gabriel Achim & Dragoș Buliga | Adrian Văncică | October 3, 2019 |
| 314 | 9 | "Dragoste pe datorie" | Gabriel Achim & Dragoș Buliga | Leonid Doni | October 8, 2019 |
| 315 | 10 | "Manevra lui Vasile (1)" | Gabriel Achim & Dragoș Buliga | Mimi Brănescu | October 15, 2019 |
| 316 | 11 | "Manevra lui Vasile (2)" | Gabriel Achim & Dragoș Buliga | Mimi Brănescu | October 17, 2019 |
| 317 | 12 | "Motorul Economiei (1)" | Gabriel Achim & Dragoș Buliga | Adrian Văncică | October 22, 2019 |
| 318 | 13 | "Motorul Economiei (2)" | Gabriel Achim & Dragoș Buliga | Adrian Văncică | October 24, 2019 |
| 319 | 14 | "Cade Partidul (1)" | Gabriel Achim & Dragoș Buliga | Mimi Brănescu | October 29, 2019 |
| 320 | 15 | "Cade Partidul (2)" | Gabriel Achim & Dragoș Buliga | Mimi Brănescu | October 31, 2019 |
| 321 | 16 | "Sport, Plăcinte si Cultura (1)" | Gabriel Achim & Dragoș Buliga | Mimi Brănescu | November 5, 2019 |
| 322 | 17 | "Sport, Plăcinte si Cultura (2)" | Gabriel Achim & Dragoș Buliga | Mimi Brănescu | November 7, 2019 |
| 323 | 18 | "Îndrăgostitul" | Gabriel Achim & Dragoș Buliga | Leonid Doni | November 12, 2019 |
| 324 | 19 | "Rață, Cap de Piatră! (1)" | Gabriel Achim & Dragoș Buliga | Mimi Brănescu | November 19, 2019 |
| 325 | 20 | "Rață, Cap de Piatră! (2)" | Gabriel Achim & Dragoș Buliga | Mimi Brănescu | November 21, 2019 |
| 326 | 21 | "15 Bile Negre (1)" | Gabriel Achim & Dragoș Buliga | Mimi Brănescu | November 26, 2019 |
| 327 | 22 | "15 Bile Negre (2)" | Gabriel Achim & Dragoș Buliga | Mimi Brănescu | November 28, 2019 |
| 328 | 23 | "Inelul (1)" | Gabriel Achim & Dragoș Buliga | Adrian Văncică | December 3, 2019 |
| 329 | 24 | "Inelul (2)" | Gabriel Achim & Dragoș Buliga | Adrian Văncică | December 5, 2019 |
| 330 | 25 | "Magia Dalidei (1)" | Gabriel Achim & Dragoș Buliga | Mimi Brănescu | December 10, 2019 |
| 331 | 26 | "Magia Dalidei (2)" | Gabriel Achim & Dragoș Buliga | Mimi Brănescu | December 12, 2019 |
| 332 | 27 | "Episod de Craciun" | Gabriel Achim & Dragoș Buliga | Adrian Văncică | December 24, 2019 |

=== Season 17 ===
| No. overall | No. in season | Title | Directed by | Written by | Original release date |
|---|---|---|---|---|---|
| 333 | 1 | "Penelopa (1)" | Gabriel Achim & Dragoș Buliga | Mimi Brănescu | February 4, 2020 |
| 334 | 2 | "Penelopa (2)" | Gabriel Achim & Dragoș Buliga | Mimi Brănescu | February 6, 2020 |
| 335 | 3 | "Măseaua de Minte" | Gabriel Achim & Dragoș Buliga | Dan Chiriac | February 11, 2020 |
| 336 | 4 | "Copilul cu trei tați" | Gabriel Achim & Dragoș Buliga | Adrian Văncică | February 13, 2020 |
| 337 | 5 | "Parpalacul" | Gabriel Achim & Dragoș Buliga | Dan Chiriac | February 18, 2020 |
| 338 | 6 | "Helanca roșie" | Gabriel Achim & Dragoș Buliga | Dan Chiriac | February 20, 2020 |
| 339 | 7 | "Petrecerea lui Giani (1)" | Gabriel Achim & Dragoș Buliga | Adrian Văncică | February 25, 2020 |
| 340 | 8 | "Petrecerea lui Giani (2)" | Gabriel Achim & Dragoș Buliga | Adrian Văncică | February 27, 2020 |
| 341 | 9 | "Ohoo (1)" | Gabriel Achim & Dragoș Buliga | Adrian Văncică | March 3, 2020 |
| 342 | 10 | "Ohoo (2)" | Gabriel Achim & Dragoș Buliga | Adrian Văncică | March 5, 2020 |
| 343 | 11 | "Despina (1)" | Gabriel Achim & Dragoș Buliga | Dan Panaet | March 10, 2020 |
| 344 | 12 | "Despina (2)" | Gabriel Achim & Dragoș Buliga | Dan Panaet | March 12, 2020 |
| 345 | 13 | "Restaurantul Japonez (1)" | Gabriel Achim & Dragoș Buliga | Mimi Brănescu | March 17, 2020 |
| 346 | 14 | "Restaurantul Japonez (2)" | Gabriel Achim & Dragoș Buliga | Mimi Brănescu | March 19, 2020 |
| 347 | 15 | "Restaurantul Japonez (3)" | Gabriel Achim & Dragoș Buliga | Mimi Brănescu | March 23, 2020 |

=== Sezonul 18 ===
| No. overall | No. in season | Title | Directed by | Written by | Original release date |
|---|---|---|---|---|---|
| 349 | 1 | "Comisia de depresie (1)" | Gabriel Achim & Dragoș Buliga | Mimi Brănescu | September 7, 2020 |
| 350 | 2 | "Comisia de depresie (2)" | Gabriel Achim & Dragoș Buliga | Mimi Brănescu | September 8, 2020 |
| 351 | 3 | "Comisia de depresie (3)" | Gabriel Achim & Dragoș Buliga | Mimi Brănescu | September 10, 2020 |
| 352 | 4 | "Puf și lux (1)" | Gabriel Achim & Dragoș Buliga | Cătălin Babliuc | September 15, 2020 |
| 353 | 5 | "Puf și lux (2)" | Gabriel Achim & Dragoș Buliga | Cătălin Babliuc | September 17, 2020 |
| 354 | 6 | "Crima din Fierbinți" | Gabriel Achim & Dragoș Buliga | Adrian Văncică | September 22, 2020 |
| 355 | 7 | "Alegerile" | Gabriel Achim & Dragoș Buliga | Mimi Brănescu | September 24, 2020 |
| 356 | 8 | "Frate ca al meu (1)" | Gabriel Achim & Dragoș Buliga | Mimi Brănescu | September 29, 2020 |
| 357 | 9 | "Frate ca al meu (2)" | Gabriel Achim & Dragoș Buliga | Mimi Brănescu | October 1, 2020 |
| 358 | 10 | "Concurența" | Gabriel Achim & Dragoș Buliga | Leonid Doni | October 6, 2020 |
| 359 | 11 | "Abonatul nu răspunde (1)" | Gabriel Achim & Dragoș Buliga | Mimi Brănescu | October 8, 2020 |
| 360 | 12 | "Abonatul nu răspunde (2)" | Gabriel Achim & Dragoș Buliga | Mimi Brănescu | October 13, 2020 |
| 361 | 13 | "Abonatul nu răspunde (3)" | Gabriel Achim & Dragoș Buliga | Mimi Brănescu | October 15, 2020 |
| 362 | 14 | "Norocosul (1)" | Gabriel Achim & Dragoș Buliga | Adrian Văncică | October 20, 2020 |
| 363 | 15 | "Norocosul (2)" | Gabriel Achim & Dragoș Buliga | Adrian Văncică | October 22, 2020 |
| 364 | 16 | "Atenție la satelit (1)" | Gabriel Achim & Dragoș Buliga | Mimi Brănescu | October 27, 2020 |
| 365 | 17 | "Atenție la satelit (2)" | Gabriel Achim & Dragoș Buliga | Mimi Brănescu | October 29, 2020 |
| 366 | 18 | "Semeseurile (1)" | Gabriel Achim & Dragoș Buliga | Adrian Văncică | November 3, 2020 |
| 367 | 19 | "Semeseurile (2)" | Gabriel Achim & Dragoș Buliga | Adrian Văncică | November 5, 2020 |
| 368 | 20 | "Găina, școala și consola (1)" | Gabriel Achim & Dragoș Buliga | Mimi Brănescu | November 10, 2020 |
| 369 | 21 | "Găina, școala și consola (2)" | Gabriel Achim & Dragoș Buliga | Mimi Brănescu | November 12, 2020 |
| 370 | 22 | "Talabosul" | Gabriel Achim & Dragoș Buliga | Mihai Bobonete | November 17, 2020 |
| 371 | 23 | "Manevra" | Gabriel Achim & Dragoș Buliga | Adrian Văncică | November 19, 2020 |
| 372 | 24 | "Adio, mamă soacră (1)" | Gabriel Achim & Dragoș Buliga | Adrian Văncică | November 24, 2020 |
| 373 | 25 | "Adio, mamă soacră (2)" | Gabriel Achim & Dragoș Buliga | Adrian Văncică | November 26, 2020 |
| 374 | 26 | "Episod Special (1 Decembrie)" | Gabriel Achim & Dragoș Buliga | Adrian Văncică | December 1, 2020 |
| 375 | 27 | "Autostrada" | Gabriel Achim & Dragoș Buliga | Leonid Doni | December 3, 2020 |
| 376 | 28 | "Lecția de șmecherie (1)" | Gabriel Achim & Dragoș Buliga | Mimi Brănescu | December 8, 2020 |
| 377 | 29 | "Lecția de șmecherie (2)" | Gabriel Achim & Dragoș Buliga | Mimi Brănescu | December 10, 2020 |
| 378 | 30 | "Balaurul (1)" | Gabriel Achim & Dragoș Buliga | Adrian Văncică | December 15, 2020 |
| 379 | 31 | "Balaurul (2)" | Gabriel Achim & Dragoș Buliga | Adrian Văncică | December 17, 2020 |
| 380 | 32 | "Episod special de Crăciun" | Gabriel Achim & Dragoș Buliga | Adrian Văncică | December 24, 2020 |
| 381 | 33 | "Tradiții" | Gabriel Achim & Dragoș Buliga | Adrian Văncică | December 31, 2020 |

=== Sezonul 19 ===
| No. overall | No. in season | Title | Directed by | Written by | Original release date |
|---|---|---|---|---|---|
| 382 | 1 | "Poliția te veghează (1)" | Gabriel Achim & Dragoș Buliga | Mimi Brănescu | February 2, 2021 |
| 383 | 2 | "Poliția te veghează (2)" | Gabriel Achim & Dragoș Buliga | Mimi Brănescu | February 4, 2021 |
| 384 | 3 | "Cobza nu-i ca madolina (1)" | Gabriel Achim & Dragoș Buliga | Mimi Brănescu | February 9, 2021 |
| 385 | 4 | "Cobza nu-i ca madolina (2)" | Gabriel Achim & Dragoș Buliga | Mimi Brănescu | February 11, 2021 |
| 386 | 5 | "Istoria (1)" | Gabriel Achim & Dragoș Buliga | Adrian Văncică | February 16, 2021 |
| 387 | 6 | "Istoria (2)" | Gabriel Achim & Dragoș Buliga | Adrian Văncică | February 18, 2021 |
| 388 | 7 | "Supraviețuitorul (1)" | Gabriel Achim & Dragoș Buliga | Mimi Brănescu | February 23, 2021 |
| 389 | 8 | "Supraviețuitorul (2)" | Gabriel Achim & Dragoș Buliga | Mimi Brănescu | February 25, 2021 |
| 390 | 9 | "Papagalul (1)" | Gabriel Achim & Dragoș Buliga | Adrian Văncică | March 2, 2021 |
| 391 | 10 | "Papagalul (2)" | Gabriel Achim & Dragoș Buliga | Adrian Văncică | March 4, 2021 |
| 392 | 11 | "La păcănele (1)" | Gabriel Achim & Dragoș Buliga | Mimi Brănescu | March 9, 2021 |
| 393 | 12 | "La păcănele (2)" | Gabriel Achim & Dragoș Buliga | Mimi Brănescu | March 11, 2021 |
| 394 | 13 | "Taxiul (1)" | Gabriel Achim & Dragoș Buliga | Mimi Brănescu | March 16, 2021 |
| 395 | 14 | "Taxiul (2)" | Gabriel Achim & Dragoș Buliga | Mimi Brănescu | March 18, 2021 |
| 396 | 15 | "Piscina" | Gabriel Achim & Dragoș Buliga | Mimi Brănescu | March 23, 2021 |
| 397 | 16 | "Marele Boss" | Gabriel Achim & Dragoș Buliga | Mimi Brănescu | March 25, 2021 |
| 398 | 17 | "Rulota" | Gabriel Achim & Dragoș Buliga | Mimi Brănescu | March 30, 2021 |
| 399 | 18 | "Concursul" | Gabriel Achim & Dragoș Buliga | Mimi Brănescu | April 1, 2021 |
| 400 | 19 | "Ore suplimentare" | Gabriel Achim & Dragoș Buliga | Adrian Văncică | April 6, 2021 |
| 401 | 20 | "Hai la București" | Gabriel Achim & Dragoș Buliga | Adrian Văncică | April 8, 2021 |
| 402 | 21 | "Magia ciocanului" | Gabriel Achim & Dragoș Buliga | Adrian Văncică | April 13, 2021 |
| 403 | 22 | "Iutubării" | Gabriel Achim & Dragoș Buliga | Adrian Văncică | April 15, 2021 |
| 404 | 23 | "Dorințe ascunse (1)" | Gabriel Achim & Dragoș Buliga | Adrian Văncică | April 20, 2021 |
| 405 | 24 | "Dorințe ascunse (2)" | Gabriel Achim & Dragoș Buliga | Adrian Văncică | April 22, 2021 |
| 406 | 25 | "Plictiseala, gardul și inelul (1)" | Gabriel Achim & Dragoș Buliga | Adrian Văncică | April 27, 2021 |
| 407 | 26 | "Plictiseala, gardul și inelul (2)" | Gabriel Achim & Dragoș Buliga | Adrian Văncică | April 29, 2021 |
| 408 | 27 | "Bradul argintiu (1)" | Gabriel Achim & Dragoș Buliga | Adrian Văncică | May 4, 2021 |
| 409 | 28 | "Bradul argintiu (2)" | Gabriel Achim & Dragoș Buliga | Adrian Văncică | May 6, 2021 |
| 410 | 29 | "Fantoma (1)" | Gabriel Achim & Dragoș Buliga | Adrian Văncică | May 11, 2021 |
| 411 | 30 | "Fantoma (2)" | Gabriel Achim & Dragoș Buliga | Adrian Văncică | May 13, 2021 |
| 412 | 31 | "Casetofonul" | Gabriel Achim & Dragoș Buliga | Adrian Văncică | May 18, 2021 |
| 413 | 32 | "Europa digitală" | Gabriel Achim & Dragoș Buliga | Adrian Văncică | May 20, 2021 |
| 414 | 33 | "Cupa Fierbințiului" | Gabriel Achim & Dragoș Buliga | Adrian Văncică | May 25, 2021 |
| 415 | 34 | "Hoțul care n-a furat" | Gabriel Achim & Dragoș Buliga | Cătălin Babliuc | May 27, 2021 |
