= CSM Focșani (football) =

Romanian association men's football team

- Full name: Club Sportiv Municipal Focșani
- Nicknames: Focșănenii (The People from Focșani)
- Short name: Focșani
- Founded: 1953; 73 years ago as Spartac Focșani; 2002; 24 years ago as Unirea 2002 Focșani; 2007; 19 years ago as CSM Focșani; 2016; 10 years ago (refounded)
- Ground: Milcovul
- Capacity: 8,500
- Head coach: Elvis Ilaș
- League: Liga IV
- 2025–26: Liga IV, Vrancea County, 11th of 14

Club Sportiv Municipal Focșani, also known as CSM Focșani, or simply Focșani, is a Romanian football team based in Focșani, Vrancea County, which currently competes in Liga IV – Vrancea County, the fourth tier of Romanian football.

The team represents the men's football section of the multi-sport club CSM Focșani, which also include men's basketball, men's handball, athletics, volleyball, martial arts, judo, chess, tennis, table tennis, shooting sports and taekwondo sections.

The team was founded in 1953 as Spartac Focșani and, over its history, adopted various names such as Progresul, Rapid, Fructexport, Acord, Diplomatic, and — most popular among Romanian football fans — Unirea.

== History ==
The team was founded in 1953 as Spartac Focșani and initially competed in the Bârlad Regional Championship. In its debut season, under the guidance of coach Constantin Humis, Spartac won the Regional Championship but narrowly missed promotion, finishing 2nd in the Series I of the promotion play-off held at Ploiești.

However, with the expansion of the second division in the following season, four group winners and eight additional teams were promoted to Divizia B, including Spartac. Assigned to Series III, Spartac narrowly avoided relegation by finishing 10th out of thirteen teams, just three points above the relegation line.

In 1955, the team was rebranded as Progresul and had a promising start under the new name, finishing 4th in the Series II. However, the following season saw a drop to 10th place, under the leadership of Mihai Alexandrescu.

In 1957, the team adopted the name Unirea Focșani. This change did not immediately improve the team's performance, as Unirea finished 12th in the 1957–58 season and 13th the following season under coach Valentin Stănescu, narrowly avoiding relegation due to another expansion of the second division. In the 1959–60 season, competing in the Series I, Unirea ended in 11th place.

In 1960, the team was rebranded again, this time as Rapid Focșani, and achieved 10th-place finishes in both the 1960–61 and 1961–62 seasons. However, by the end of the 1962–63 season, the team finished 13th and was relegated to Divizia C after eight consecutive seasons in the second division.

The team went through several name changes in the following years. Under the name Fructexport from 1963 to 1966, finishes included 8th (1963–64), 4th (1964–65), and 5th (1965–66). The name Unirea was re-adopted until 1970, with the team finishing 5th (1966–67), 12th (1967–68), 2nd (1968–69), just three points behind Metalul Plopeni, and 13th (1969–70). Another rebranding as Automobilul followed from 1970 to 1972, finishing 13th (1970–71) and 4th (1971–72).

In 1972, the team returned to the name Unirea and, under coach Zoltan David, achieved a 4th-place finish in the 1972–73 season, followed by a 1st-place finish in the 1973–74 season, marking a return to the second division after an eleven-year absence.

However, the following three seasons in Divizia B proved challenging. Under Constantin Marinescu's guidance, Unirea had a mid-table 9th-place finish in the 1974–75 season, but the team’s performance began to decline. In the 1975–76 season, Marinescu was replaced by Gheorghe Făiniță after just eleven rounds. Unfortunately, Făiniță's impact was minimal; despite his efforts to stabilize the team, they struggled throughout the season, ultimately finishing 14th and narrowly avoiding relegation due to goal difference.

The situation deteriorated further in the following season. Făiniță was dismissed after only seven rounds and replaced by Mihai Macri. However, the team was unable to find consistent form, resulting in relegation to Divizia C after finishing 15th.

After relegation to the third division, the team was renamed Unirea IDSMSA Focșani, reflecting the sponsorship of the Intreprinderea de Dispozitive, Ștanțe, Matrițe și Scule Așchietoare (lit. ''Enterprise for Devices, Stamps, Molds, and Cutting Tools.''). Zoltan David was brought back as head coach, leading the team to a runner-up finish in the fourth Series IV of Divizia C in the 1977–78 season, seven points behind leaders Chimia Brazi. The team also had a strong run in the Cupa României, reaching the Round of 32 before being eliminated in a narrow 0–1 defeat to Argeș Pitești.

In the 1978–79 campaign, the group from Milcov made a determined push for promotion, overtaking CSU Galați and their local rivals Dinamo Focșani. The team clinched the top position in the third series and secured promotion to Divizia B. Coached by Vasile Stancu, the squad included players such as Paraschiv, Gheorghiu, Zaiț, Pastia, Galan, Anghel, Sima, Costea, Manolache, Chioveanu, Liciu, Ouatu, Oprișan, and Rusu.

After returning to Divizia B, Unirea quickly became a strong contender in the second division, achieving some of their best results during this period. In his first season back, the team, led by Vasile Stancu, secured a solid 4th place finish, one of their best finishes in Divizia B.

In 1980, Unirea Focșani merged with local rivals Dinamo CPL Focșani to strengthen the club financially and improve the quality of the team. Following the merger, the club was renamed Unirea Dinamo Focșani. Aristide Ghiță was appointed as the new head coach, with Gh. Cernat as his assistant. The team finished the 1980–81 season in 3rd place, repeating this result in the 1981–82 season. The squad included players such as Gheorghiu, Paraschiv, Negoi, Gheorghe, Anghel, Zaiț, Gaitan, Chioveanu, Radu, Pastia, Burleanu, Argăseală, Liciu, Brumaru, Ghica, Rusu, Manolache, Sima, Negoescu, and Drăgan.

Ghiță remained in charge for the 1982–83 season, leading Unirea Dinamo Focșani to an 11th-place finish. The following season, after a brief departure, he returned as head coach in the 1983–84 campaign, taking over from Stan Gheorghiu after twenty-three rounds and once again guiding the team to an 11th-place finish.

However, the 1984–85 season marked a downturn. Ghiță was replaced after thirteen rounds by Vasile Stancu, who lasted until the twenty-seventh round before making way for Cristian Cristea. The team finished last and was relegated to the third division. In the Cupa României, Unirea reached the Round of 32 but was eliminated after a 0–2 defeat to Sportul Studențesc.

In the 1985–86 season, Unirea Dinamo Focșani secured promotion back to Divizia B by winning Series II of Divizia C under the leadership of Cristian Costea. The team also performed well in the Cupa României, reaching the Round of 32 for the second consecutive time, where it lost 1–2 to Chimia Râmnicu Vâlcea.

Upon returning to Divizia B, the team, still coached by Costea, achieved a 6th-place finish in 1986–87 and improved to 5th the following season. In the 1988–89 season, Costea was replaced after four rounds by Dumitru Chiriță, who remained in charge until the twenty-eighth round, when Costea returned to the helm. The team went on to secure an impressive 3rd-place finish.

During its history CSM Focșani had a lot of ups and downs and also another two refounding moments, in 2002 and 2006, but the highest level achieved by the team was only Liga II.

The team was dissolved again in the summer of 2013, but only at senior level. In the summer of 2016, the senior team was refounded and enrolled in Liga IV Vrancea County under head coach Vasile Burgă, assisted by Adrian Toma. They won the 2016–17 season and secured promotion to Liga III after a promotion play-off, defeating Teiul Poiana Teiului, the Neamț County champions, 2–1 away and 3–2 at home. The squad included Lazăr, Apenciucesei, Tîrcă, Parlac, Beșa, Mihai, Manu, Negoiță, D. Popa, V. Ion, Negoescu, Lupu, Predoiu, Duca, Pasăre, R. Popa, I. Nistor, and Mitală.

In Liga III, CSM Focșani competed in Series I, finishing 10th in the 2017–18 season and 6th in 2018–19. During the 2019–20 campaign, head coach Vasile Burgă was replaced in August 2019 by technical director Marius Bratu, who took charge of the team, but after a poor run of results that left the side seven points behind the leaders, Bratu was in turn replaced by Alin Chița. The season was eventually interrupted due to the COVID-19 pandemic, with CSM Focșani sitting in 6th place when the competition was suspended.

Following a restructuring of Liga III into ten series for the 2020–21 season, CSM Focșani was placed in Series II and finished in 3rd place. In the summer of 2021, after initially starting preparations under Alin Chița, he was replaced by Marius Bratu, who led the team to finish 2nd in Series II both in the regular season and after the Series II play-off in the 2021–22 campaign, qualifying for the promotion play-offs, where it was eliminated in the first round by Dante Botoșani, 0–0 and 1–2 after extra time. During the 2022–23 season, after eight rounds, Bratu was replaced with Adrian Toma, who managed the side until the end of the campaign, with CSM Focșani ranking 5th in the regular season and 6th overall after the play-out of Series II.

The team began the 2023–24 season with Octavian Grigore as head coach, but he left two rounds before the first stage ended, with the team mathematically qualified for the play-off round of the series. Călin Moldovan was appointed as the new head coach and finished 2nd in the first stage of Series II, maintaining this position after the play-off round, thus qualifying for the promotion play-offs. In the first round, Focșănenii eliminated Bucovina Rădăuți (2–0 and 1–1) but lost in the second round to Metalul Buzău (2–1 and 0–2). CSM Focșani were given a second chance, alongside three other teams that lost in the second round. The team from Vrancea made a dramatic comeback, defeating Râmnicu Vâlcea 3–2 in the semi-final, with Zaharia scoring the decisive goal in extra time, before winning 2–0 against Dinamo București at Milcovul Stadium, securing a return to the second division after sixteen years of absence.

In the 2024–25 Liga II season, the team began under Călin Moldovan, but after being eliminated from the Cupa României in the play-off round by Liga I side Hermannstadt (0–3) and sitting third from bottom in the table after six rounds, he was dismissed, with assistant coach Rareș Forika taking over as interim for two rounds until Sorin Colceag was appointed head coach. Colceag’s spell, however, lasted only five matches before he resigned, and Alin Chița was then named head coach. Despite these managerial changes, results did not improve, and the team finished the regular season in 19th place and ended bottom of Group A in the play-out, suffering relegation.

After relegation, CSM Focșani was unable to participate in Liga III due to financial difficulties and instead joined the 2025–26 Liga IV – Vrancea County campaign, the fourth tier of the Romanian football league system, under head coach Elvis Ilaș.

== Ground ==
The team played its home matches at Tineretului Stadium until 1974, when it moved to Milcovul Stadium, a multi-use venue in Focșani, which has a capacity of 8,500 seats. The stadium's name comes from Milcov River and holds 8,500 people.

Chronology of names
Name	Period
Spartac Focșani	1953–1955
Progresul Focșani	1955–1957
Unirea Focșani	1957–1960
Rapid Focșani	1960–1963
Fructexport Focșani	1963–1966
Unirea Focșani	1966–1980
Unirea Dinamo Focșani	1980–1989
Unirea Focșani	1989–1993
Acord Focșani	1993–1997
Diplomatic Focșani	1997–2002
Unirea 2002 Focșani	2002–2007
CSM Focșani	2007–

== Honours ==
Liga III

- Winners (5): 1973–74, 1978–79, 1985–86, 1998–99, 2006–07
- Runners-up (4): 1968–69, 1977–78, 2021–22, 2023–24

Liga IV – Vrancea County

- Winners (1): 2016–17

Bârlad Regional Championship

- Winners (1): 1953

== Notable former players ==
The footballers enlisted below have had international cap(s) for their respective countries at junior and/or senior level and/or significant caps for CSM Focșani.

Romania

- (Romania) Mihai Barbu
- (Romania) Valentin Borș
- (Romania) Marius Bratu
- (Romania) Octavian Bucătaru
- (Romania) Cristian Ciobanu
- (Romania) Sorin Colceag
- (Romania) Ionuț Constantinescu
- (Romania) Ciprian Dinu
- (Romania) Răzvan Gorovei
- (Romania) Petrache Gurguiatu
- (Romania) Edward Iordănescu
- (Romania) Claudiu Juncănaru
- (Romania) Brian Lemac
- (Romania) Andrei Mărgăritescu
- (Romania) Constantin Năsturescu
- (Romania) Costel Orac
- (Romania) Răzvan Pădurețu
- (Romania) Sorin Săpunaru
- (Romania) Sorin Strătilă
- (Romania) Mădălin Predoiu
- (Romania) Narcis Răducan
- (Romania) Alexandru Zaharia

== Former managers ==
- (Romania) Constantin Humis (1953–1954)
- (Romania) Valentin Stănescu (1958–1959)
- (Romania) Zoltan David (1972–1974)
- (Romania) Constantin Marinescu (1974–1975)
- (Romania) Gheorghe Făiniță (1975–1976)
- (Romania) Mihai Macri (1976–1977)
- (Romania) Zoltan David (1977–1978)
- (Romania) Vasile Stancu (1978–1980)
- (Romania) Aristide Ghiță (1980–1983)
- (Romania) Stan Gheorghiu (1983–1984)
- (Romania) Aristide Ghiță (1984)
- (Romania) Vasile Stancu (1984–1985)
- (Romania) Cristian Cristea (1985)
- (Romania) Cristian Costea (1985–1988)
- (Romania) Dumitru Chiriță (1988–1989)
- (Romania) Costel Orac (1992–1994)
- (Romania) Ioan Sdrobiș (1999)
- (Romania) Aristide Ghiță (1999–2000)
- (Romania) Ionuț Chirilă (2002–2004)
- (Romania) Ionel Augustin (2004–2005)
- (Romania) Ionel Augustin (2007)
- (Romania) Gheorghe Mihali (2007–2008)
- (Romania) Adrian Toma (2011–2012)
- (Romania) Vasile Burgă (2016–2019)
- (Romania) Marius Bratu (2019)
- (Romania) Alin Chița (2019–2021)
- (Romania) Marius Bratu (2021–2022)
- (Romania) Adrian Toma (2022–2023)
- (Romania) Octavian Grigore (2023–2024)
- (Romania) Călin Moldovan (2024)
- (Romania) Sorin Colceag (2024)
- (Romania) Alin Chița (2024–2025)
- (Romania) Elvis Ilaș (2025–)

== League and Cup history ==
Season	Tier	Division	Place	Notes	Cupa României
2024–25	2	Liga II	19th	Relegated	Play-off round
2023–24	3	Liga III (Seria II)	2nd	Promoted	
2022–23	3	Liga III (Seria II)	6th		
2021–22	3	Liga III (Seria II)	2nd		
2020–21	3	Liga III (Seria II)	3rd		
2019–20	3	Liga III (Seria I)	5th		
2018–19	3	Liga III (Seria I)	6th		
2017–18	3	Liga III (Seria I)	10th		
2016–17	4	Liga IV (VN)	1st (C)	Promoted	
2012–13	3	Liga III (Seria II)	12th	Relegated	
2011–12	3	Liga III (Seria I)	12th		
2010–11	3	Liga III (Seria I)	13th		
2009–10	3	Liga III (Seria I)	11th		
2008–09	3	Liga III (Seria I)	4th		
2007–08	2	Liga II (Seria I)	16th	Relegated	
2006–07	3	Liga III (Seria I)	1st (C)	Promoted	

Season	Tier	Division	Place	Notes	Cupa României
2004–05	2	Divizia B (Seria I)	15th	Relegated	
2003–04	2	Divizia B (Seria I)	8th		
2002–03	2	Divizia B (Seria I)	10th		Round of 16
2001–02	2	Divizia B (Seria I)	11th		
2000–01	2	Divizia B (Seria I)	12th		
1999–00	2	Divizia B (Seria I)	13th		
1998–99	3	Divizia C (Seria I)	1st (C)	Promoted	Round of 32
1997–98	3	Divizia C (Seria I)	4th		Round of 32
1995–96	3	Divizia C (Seria I)	17th	Relegated	
1994–95	2	Divizia B (Seria I)	17th	Relegated	
1993–94	2	Divizia B (Seria I)	4th		
1992–93	2	Divizia B (Seria I)	6th		
1991–92	2	Divizia B (Seria I)	12th		
1990–91	2	Divizia B (Seria I)	9th		
1989–90	2	Divizia B (Seria I)	10th		
1988–89	2	Divizia B (Seria I)	3rd		
