= Valentin Dima =

Romanian footballer

Personal information
- Full name: Valentin Costin Dima
- Date of birth: 25 June 1989 (age 37)
- Place of birth: Bucharest, Romania
- Height: 1.69 m (5 ft 6 1/2 in)
- Position: Right-back

Youth career
- 2002–2009: Juventus București

Senior career*
Years	Team	Apps	(Gls)
2009–2011	Juventus București	44	(1)
2010–2012	Concordia Chiajna	14	(0)
2012	Olt Slatina	14	(0)
2013–2014	Concordia Chiajna	19	(0)
2014–2015	CSMS Iaşi	2	(0)
2015–2018	Daco-Getica București	43	(1)
2019–2020	Tunari		
- * Club domestic league appearances and goals as of 15 October 2020

Valentin Costin Dima (born 25 June 1989 in Bucharest) is a Romanian footballer.
