= Mădălin Stancu =

Romanian footballer

Personal information
- Full name: Mădălin Daniel Stancu
- Date of birth: 6 January 1992 (age 34)
- Place of birth: Timișoara, Romania
- Height: 1.76 m (5 ft 9 in)
- Position: Midfielder

Team information
- Current team: Dumbrăvița
- Number: 5

Senior career*
Years	Team	Apps	(Gls)
2011–2013	Caransebeș	?	(?)
2013–2014	Gloria Bistrița	18	(0)
2014–2015	Bihor Oradea	17	(0)
2015–2017	ASU Politehnica	28	(2)
2018–	Dumbrăvița	?	(?)
- * Club domestic league appearances and goals as of 16 January 2018

Mădălin Daniel Stancu (born 6 January 1992) is a Romanian professional footballer who plays as a midfielder for Liga III side ACS Dumbrăvița.
