= Alin Chița =

Romanian footballer and manager

Personal information
- Full name: Alin Nicolae Chița
- Date of birth: 5 September 1977 (age 49)
- Place of birth: Pitești, Romania
- Height: 1.86 m (6 ft 1 in)
- Position: Defender

Youth career
- –1997: Argeş Pitești

Senior career*
Years	Team	Apps	(Gls)
1997–2000	Dacia Pitești	44	(2)
2000–2001	Politehnica Timişoara	27	(5)
2001–2007	Argeş Pitești	173	(2)
2007–2009	UTA Arad	33	(0)
2009	Tianjin TEDA	7	(0)
2010	Juventus București	10	(2)
2010	Al-Faisaly	12	(2)
Total		316	(13)

Managerial career
- 2011: Juventus București
- 2012–2014: Mioveni (assistant)
- 2014: Dinamo București (assistant)
- 2015: Dinamo București (assistant)
- 2015: Voluntari (assistant)
- 2017: Național Sebiș
- 2018: Metaloglobus București
- 2018: Alexandria
- 2019–2021: CSM Focșani
- 2022–2023: Rapid București (assistant)
- 2023: Neftchi Baku (assistant)
- 2024: CFR Cluj (assistant)
- 2024: Mioveni
- 2024–2025: CSM Focșani
- * Club domestic league appearances and goals

Alin Nicolae Chița (born 5 September 1977) is a Romanian professional football manager and former player.

== Honours ==
Juventus București

- Liga III: 2009–10
