= Colentina Stadium =

Stadium in Bucharest, Romania

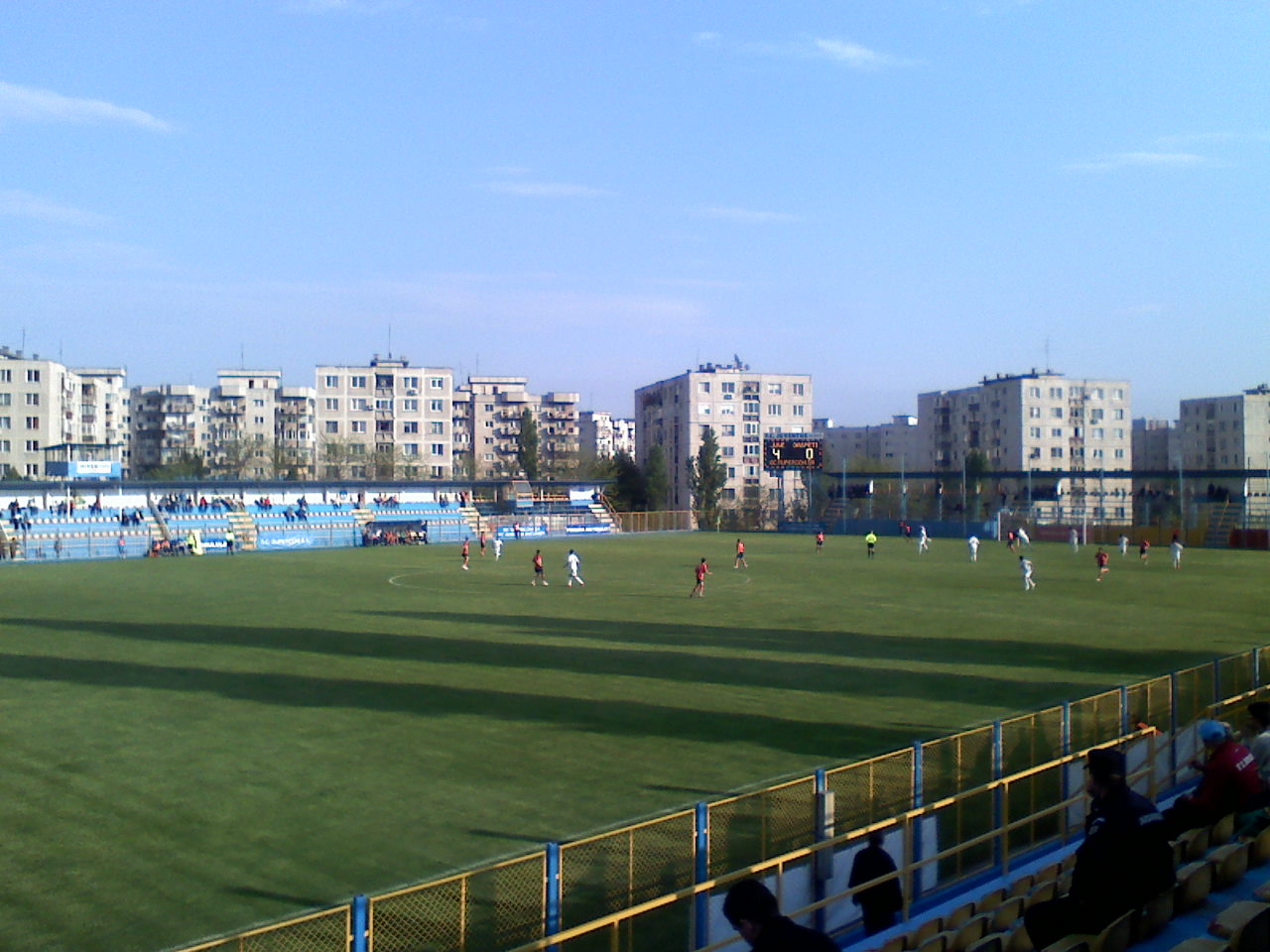
- The arena in 2009
- Interactive map of Colentina Stadium
- Former names: Stadionul Juventus (1992–2018)
- Address: Șos. Fundeni, nr. 243
- Location: Colentina, Romania
- Coordinates: 44°27′56.56″N 26°08′42.96″E
- Owner: Municipality of Sector 2
- Operator: Daco-Getica București
- Capacity: 6,000 seated
- Surface: Grass

Tenants
- Calculatorul București (1968–1992); Daco-Getica București (1992–present)

The Colentina Stadium is a multi-use stadium in Bucharest, Romania. It is the home ground of Daco-Getica București and holds 6,000 people, all seated.
