= Alexandru Zaharia (footballer, born 1990) =

Romanian footballer

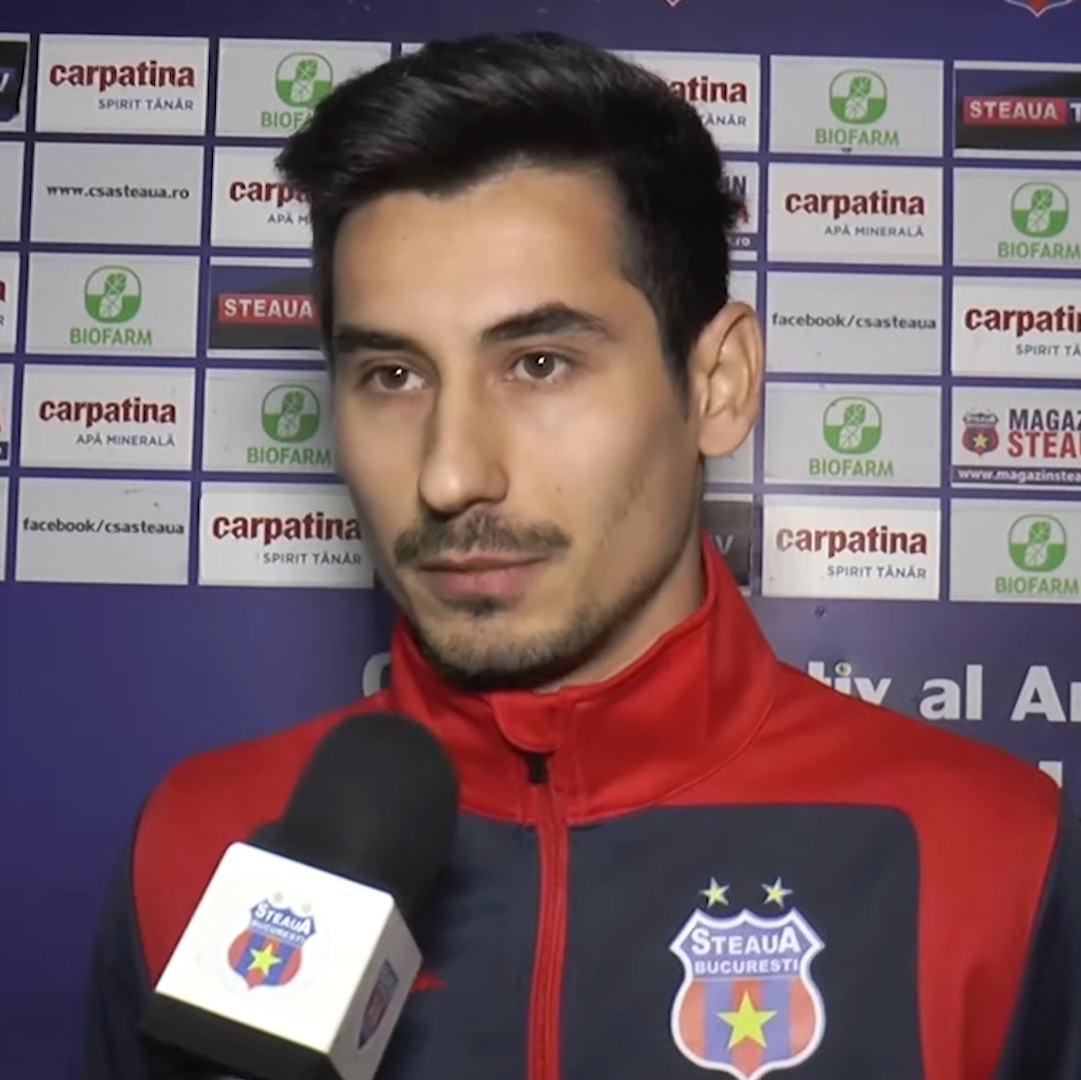
- Alexandru Zaharia in 2020

Personal information
- Full name: Alexandru Florian Zaharia
- Date of birth: 25 May 1990 (age 36)
- Place of birth: Bucharest, Romania
- Height: 1.70 m (5 ft 7 in)
- Position: Left winger

Youth career
- 1998–2010: Juventus București

Senior career*
Years	Team	Apps	(Gls)
2010–2011	Juventus București	42	(5)
2012	CS Turnu Severin	33	(4)
2013–2015	Oțelul Galați	22	(4)
2015–2017	Gaz Metan Mediaș	4	(1)
2017	Juventus București	26	(4)
2018–2019	Politehnica Iași	33	(1)
2019–2020	Petrolul Ploiești	10	(1)
2020–2022	CSA Steaua București	29	(4)
2022–2025	CSM Focșani	49	(9)
2025–2026	SCM Râmnicu Vâlcea	0	(0)
- * Club domestic league appearances and goals as of 14 December 2024

Alexandru Florian Zaharia (born 25 May 1990) is a Romanian professional footballer who plays as a left winger.

== Honours ==
Gaz Metan Mediaș

- Liga II: 2015–16

CSA Steaua București

- Liga III: 2020–21
- Liga IV – Bucharest: 2019–20
