= Dan Anghelescu =

Romanian football player (born 1958)

Personal information
- Full name: Dan Anghelescu
- Date of birth: 24 October 1958 (age 68)
- Place of birth: Bucharest, Romania

Managerial career
- Years: Team
- 1992–1995: Juventus București
- 1999–2000: US Chaouia
- 2000: MC Ouargla
- 2001–2003: Jendouba Sport
- 2003: ASAM
- 2003–2004: USM Blida
- 2004: USM El Harrach
- 2004–2005: USM Blida
- 2005–2006: NA Hussein Dey
- 2006–2007: ASFA Yennega
- 2007: Mouloudia Béjaïa
- 2008: Niger
- 2009–2010: AS Salé
- 2012–2013: US Chaouia
- 2013–2014: JSM Chéraga
- 2014: MO Constantine
- 2017: RC Kouba

Dan Anghelescu (born 24 October 1958) is a retired Romanian football player and currently coach. He lastly managed RC Kouba in the Algerian Ligue Professionnelle 2.

He has made a resume by promoting teams from inferior leaguers, and players, in Romania, before he decided to go to Africa and coach there, in 1999. He trained teams in Algeria, Tunisia, Burkina Faso and Niger.

He was manager of the Niger national football team between June and December 2008.

He led JSM Chéraga for the first time to the semifinals of the 2013–14 Algerian Cup.
