= 2019–20 Liga IV Teleorman =

Fourth tier Romanian football season

Liga IV Teleorman
- Season: 2019–20

The 2019–20 Liga IV Teleorman (Liga IV Fortuna Sports for sponsorship reasons) was the 52nd season of the Liga IV Teleorman, the fourth tier of the Romanian football league system. The season began on 30 August 2019 and was scheduled to end in June 2020, but was suspended in March because of the COVID-19 pandemic in Romania.

The season was ended officially on 20 July 2020 after AJF Teleorman (County Football Association) concluding that the teams could not meet the medical conditions imposed by the medical protocol. Unirea Țigănești was crowned as county champion.

== Team changes ==
=== To Liga IV Teleorman ===
Relegated from Liga III

- —

Promoted from Liga V Teleorman

- Inter Purani
- Steaua Spătărei
- Avântul Stejaru
- Cetatea Turnu Măgurele

=== From Liga IV Teleorman ===
Promoted to Liga III

- —

Relegated to Liga V Teleorman

- —

=== Other changes ===
- Unirea Brânceni, Dunărea Zimnicea and Inter Purani they withdrew because of financial problems.
- Unirea Moșteni and Atletic Orbeasca were spared from relegation

== League table ==
Pos	Team	Pld	W	D	L	GF	GA	GD	Pts	Qualification
1	Unirea Țigănești (C, Q)	18	16	1	1	61	15	+46	49	Qualification to promotion play-off
2	Ajax Botoroaga	18	15	0	3	82	22	+60	45	
3	Rapid Buzescu	18	15	0	3	78	18	+60	45	
4	Avântul Bragadiru	18	12	3	3	73	27	+46	39	
5	Astra Plosca	18	12	1	5	56	30	+26	37	
6	Voința Saelele 2017	18	9	2	7	69	38	+31	29	
7	Metalul Peretu	18	8	3	7	35	31	+4	27	
8	Steaua Spătărei	18	8	2	8	39	54	−15	26	
9	Atletic Orbeasca	18	7	0	11	50	74	−24	21	
10	Alexandria II	18	6	2	10	41	45	−4	20	
11	Unirea Moșteni	18	6	2	10	24	52	−28	20	
12	Drăgănești-Vlașca	18	4	3	11	28	63	−35	15	
13	Cetatea Turnu Măgurele	18	5	0	13	41	90	−49	15	
14	Victoria Lunca	18	4	1	13	26	61	−35	13	
15	Viitorul Butești	18	3	1	14	27	73	−46	10	
16	Avântul Stejaru	18	2	3	13	25	62	−37	9	

Updated to match(es) played on 7 March 2020. Source: AJF Teleorman
Rules for classification: 1) Points; 2) Head-to-head points; 3) Head-to-head goal difference; 4) Head-to-head goals scored; 5) Head-to-head away goals scored; 6) Goal difference; 7) Goals scored.
(C) Champions; (Q) Qualified for the phase indicated

== Promotion play-off ==
Champions of Liga IV – Teleorman County face champions of Liga IV – Olt County and Liga IV – Vâlcea County.

=== Region 5 (South–West) ===
==== Group B ====
Pos	Team	Pld	W	D	L	GF	GA	GD	Pts	Promotion or relegation
1	Petrolul Potcoava (OT) (C, P)	2	2	0	0	3	0	+3	6	Promotion to Liga III
2	Minerul Costești (VL) (Note: Minerul Costești performed COVID-19 tests that were not approved by Romanian Football Federation and lost by forfeit the match against Petrolul Potcoava.) (P)	2	1	0	1	0	3	−3	3	Possible promotion to Liga III
3	Unirea Țigănești (TR) (Note: As the season was suspended due to the COVID-19 pandemic, Teleorman County champion, Unirea Țigănești withdrew from the 2020–21 Liga III promotion play-off, due to the medical expenses needed to comply with the medical protocol.)	2	0	0	2	0	0	0	0	Expelled

Updated to match(es) played on 9 August 2020. Source: FRF (in Romanian)
Rules for classification: 1) Points; 2) Head-to-head points; 3) Head-to-head goal difference; 4) Head-to-head goals scored; 5) Head-to-head away goals scored; 6) Goal difference; 7) Goals scored 8) Penalty kicks.
(C) Champions; (P) Promoted
Notes:

1 August 2020	Petrolul Potcoava (OT)	3–0 (forfeit)	Minerul Costești (VL)	Bascov
17:30 EEST (UTC+3)				Stadium: Valea Ursului; Attendance: 0 Referee: Andrei Antonie (Bucharest)

5 August 2020	Unirea Țigănești (TR)	0–3 (forfeit)	Petrolul Potcoava (OT)	Bascov
17:30 EEST (UTC+3)				Stadium: Valea Ursului

9 August 2020	Minerul Costești (VL)	3–0 (forfeit)	Unirea Țigănești (TR)	Bascov
17:30 EEST (UTC+3)				Stadium: Valea Ursului

== See also ==
=== Main Leagues ===
- 2019–20 Liga I
- 2019–20 Liga II
- 2019–20 Liga III
- 2019–20 Liga IV

=== County Leagues (Liga IV series) ===
- 2019–20 Liga IV Alba
- 2019–20 Liga IV Arad
- 2019–20 Liga IV Argeș
- 2019–20 Liga IV Bacău
- 2019–20 Liga IV Bihor
- 2019–20 Liga IV Bistrița-Năsăud
- 2019–20 Liga IV Botoșani
- 2019–20 Liga IV Brăila
- 2019–20 Liga IV Brașov
- 2019–20 Liga IV Bucharest
- 2019–20 Liga IV Buzău
- 2019–20 Liga IV Călărași
- 2019–20 Liga IV Caraș-Severin
- 2019–20 Liga IV Cluj
- 2019–20 Liga IV Constanța
- 2019–20 Liga IV Covasna
- 2019–20 Liga IV Dâmbovița
- 2019–20 Liga IV Dolj
- 2019–20 Liga IV Galați
- 2019–20 Liga IV Giurgiu
- 2019–20 Liga IV Gorj
- 2019–20 Liga IV Harghita
- 2019–20 Liga IV Hunedoara
- 2019–20 Liga IV Ialomița
- 2019–20 Liga IV Iași
- 2019–20 Liga IV Ilfov
- 2019–20 Liga IV Maramureș
- 2019–20 Liga IV Mehedinți
- 2019–20 Liga IV Mureș
- 2019–20 Liga IV Neamț
- 2019–20 Liga IV Olt
- 2019–20 Liga IV Prahova
- 2019–20 Liga IV Sălaj
- 2019–20 Liga IV Satu Mare
- 2019–20 Liga IV Sibiu
- 2019–20 Liga IV Suceava
- 2019–20 Liga IV Timiș
- 2019–20 Liga IV Tulcea
- 2019–20 Liga IV Vâlcea
- 2019–20 Liga IV Vaslui
- 2019–20 Liga IV Vrancea
