= Merișani-Drăganu oil field =

Oil field in Argeș County, Romania

Merișani-Drăganu
- Country: Romania
- Region: Argeș County
- Offshore/onshore: onshore
- Operator: Petrom

Field history
- Discovery: 1967
- Start of development: 1967
- Start of production: 1968

Production
- Current production of oil: 800 barrels per day (~40,000 t/a)
- Estimated oil in place: 2.92 million tonnes (~ 3.3×10^{6} m^{3} or 21 million bbl)

The Merișani-Drăganu oil field is an oil field located in Merișani and Drăganu communes in Argeș County. It was discovered in 1967 and developed by Petrom. It began production in 1968 and produces oil. The total proven reserves of the Merișani-Drăganu oil field are around 21 million barrels (2.92 million tonnes), and production is centered on 800 barrels per day (130 m^{3}/d).
