= Bascov (river) =

- Location within Romania

Location
- Country: Romania
- Counties: Argeș County

Physical characteristics
- Mouth: Argeș
  - location: Bascov
  - coordinates: 44.8856°N 24.8535°E
- Length: 35 km (22 mi)
- Basin size: 90 km^{2} (35 sq mi)

Basin features
- Progression: Argeș→ Danube→ Black Sea
- Tributaries
  - right: Bascoveni, Certeli

The Bascov is a right tributary of the river Argeș in Romania. It discharges into the Argeș near Pitești. It flows through the villages Bunești, Bascovele, Negești, Ursoaia, Dumbrăvești, Drăganu-Olteni, Prislopu Mare, Valea Ursului, Brăileni, Uiasca and Bascov. Its length is 35 km (22 mi) and its basin size is 90 km^{2} (35 sq mi).
