= 2019–20 Liga IV =

78th season of the Liga IV, the fourth tier of the Romanian football league

Liga IV
- Season: 2019–20

The 2019–20 Liga IV was the 78th season of Liga IV and the 52nd since the 1968 administrative and territorial reorganization of the country, representing the fourth tier of the Romanian football league system. The champions of each county association played against one from a neighbouring county in a play-off for promotion to Liga III.

This had to be the third season when the counties were divided into seven regions, each consisting of six counties and the draw was made on 15 February 2019, with four months before the first matches.

In the spring of 2020, most of the county leagues were suspended due to the COVID-19 pandemic. On 11 May 2020, the Romanian Football Federation announced that the promotion format will be changed, especially due to the fact that no team (apart from the teams that were already excluded or dissolved) relegated from Liga III. The promotion play-off system was changed from 21 two-legged matches in 14 groups of 3 teams, the winners of the groups and the best 7 ranked runners-up will be promoted to the third tier, 14 teams instead of 21. The groups will be played on neutral ground.

== County leagues ==
North–East

- Bacău (BC)
- Botoșani (BT)
- Iași (IS)
- Neamț (NT)
- Suceava (SV)
- Vaslui (VS)

North–West

- Bihor (BH)
- Bistrița-Năsăud (BN)
- Cluj (CJ)
- Maramureș (MM)
- Satu Mare (SM)
- Sălaj (SJ)

Center

- Alba (AB)
- Brașov (BV)
- Covasna (CV)
- Harghita (HR)
- Mureș (MS)
- Sibiu (SB)

West

- Arad (AR)
- Caraș-Severin (CS)
- Gorj (GJ)
- Hunedoara (HD)
- Mehedinți (MH)
- Timiș (TM)

South–West

- Argeș (AG)
- Dâmbovița (DB)
- Dolj (DJ)
- Olt (OT)
- Teleorman (TR)
- Vâlcea (VL)

South

- Bucharest (B)
- Călărași (CL)
- Giurgiu (GR)
- Ialomița (IL)
- Ilfov (IF)
- Prahova (PH)

South–East

- Brăila (BR)
- Buzău (BZ)
- Constanța (CT)
- Galați (GL)
- Tulcea (TL)
- Vrancea (VN)

== Promotion play-off ==
The matches were played in 5, 9 and 11 August 2020.

=== Region 1 (North–East) ===
Group A

Pos	Team	Pld	W	D	L	GF	GA	GD	Pts	Promotion
1	Bradu Borca (NT) (P)	2	2	0	0	11	1	+10	6	Promotion to Liga III
2	Siretul Dolhasca (SV) (Q)	2	0	1	1	1	4	−3	1	Possible promotion to Liga III
3	Unirea Mircești (IS)	2	0	1	1	2	9	−7	1	

Source: FRF (in Romanian)
Rules for classification: 1) Points; 2) Head-to-head points; 3) Head-to-head goal difference; 4) Head-to-head goals scored; 5) Head-to-head away goals scored; 6) Goal difference; 7) Goals scored 8) Penalty kicks 8) Penalty kicks.
(P) Promoted; (Q) Qualified for the phase indicated

Results

1 August 2020	Unirea Mircești	1–8	Bradu Borca	Vaslui
17:30 EEST (UTC+3)	Șt. Florea 42'		Crengăniș 3', 34'; Onofraș 7', 23' (pen.), 32' (pen.); Talpan 20'; Gorea 44'; Guțu 51'	Stadium: Municipal; Attendance: 0 Referee: Sergiu Mavriche (Bacău)

5 August 2020	Siretul Dolhasca	1–1 (4–2 p)	Unirea Mircești	Vaslui
17:30 EEST (UTC+3)	Tofan 58'		Scrab 50'	Stadium: Municipal; Attendance: 0 Referee: Eduard Ioniță (Galați)

9 August 2020	Bradu Borca	3–0	Siretul Dolhasca	Vaslui
17:30 EEST (UTC+3)	Antim 9'; Crengăniş 38'; Onofraş (?)			Stadium: Municipal; Attendance: 0 Referee: Bogdan Dumitrache (Bucharest)

Group B

Pos	Team	Pld	W	D	L	GF	GA	GD	Pts	Promotion
1	Dante Botoșani (BT) (P)	2	2	0	0	4	1	+3	6	Promotion to Liga III
2	Sporting Juniorul Vaslui (VS) (P)	2	1	0	1	4	2	+2	3	Possible promotion to Liga III
3	Viitorul Curița (BC)	2	0	0	2	0	5	−5	0	

Source: FRF (in Romanian)
Rules for classification: 1) Points; 2) Head-to-head points; 3) Head-to-head goal difference; 4) Head-to-head goals scored; 5) Head-to-head away goals scored; 6) Goal difference; 7) Goals scored 8) Penalty kicks.
(P) Promoted

Results

1 August 2020	Sporting Juniorul Vaslui	1–2	Dante Botoșani	Pașcani
17:30 EEST (UTC+3)	Ailenei 37' (pen.)		Grăsanu 57' (pen.); Gheorghiciuc 68'	Stadium: CFR; Attendance: 0 Referee: Vlad Baban (Iași)

5 August 2020	Viitorul Curița	0–3	Sporting Juniorul Vaslui	Pașcani
17:30 EEST (UTC+3)			Ailenei 18' (pen.), 63'; Codreanu 20'	Stadium: CFR; Attendance: 0 Referee: Vasile Buzea (Bucharest)

9 August 2020	Dante Botoșani	2–0	Viitorul Curița	Pașcani
17:30 EEST (UTC+3)	Gheorghiciuc 50'; Orășanu 60' (pen.)			Stadium: CFR; Attendance: 0 Referee: Adrian Cojocaru (Galați)

=== Region 2 (North–West) ===
Group A

Pos	Team	Pld	W	D	L	GF	GA	GD	Pts	Promotion
1	Satu Mare (SM) (P)	2	1	1	0	3	1	+2	4	Promotion to Liga III
2	CA Oradea (BH) (P)	2	1	0	1	3	4	−1	3	Possible promotion to Liga III
3	Someșul Dej (CJ)	2	0	1	1	1	2	−1	1	

Source: FRF (in Romanian)
Rules for classification: 1) Points; 2) Head-to-head points; 3) Head-to-head goal difference; 4) Head-to-head goals scored; 5) Head-to-head away goals scored; 6) Goal difference; 7) Goals scored 8) Penalty kicks.
(P) Promoted

Results

1 August 2020	Satu Mare	0–0 (3–5 p)	Someșul Dej	Zalău
17:30 EEST (UTC+3)				Stadium: Municipal; Attendance: 0 Referee: Cristian Codrea (Baia Mare)

5 August 2020	CA Oradea	1–3	Satu Mare	Zalău
17:30 EEST (UTC+3)	Hosu 78'		Vădan 6'; Svarczkopf 53' (pen.); Nyilván 68'	Stadium: Municipal; Attendance: 0 Referee: Mircea Ardelean (Arad)

9 August 2020	Someșul Dej	1–2	CA Oradea	Zalău
17:30 EEST (UTC+3)	Sg. Costin 39'		Hosu 71'; Blăgea 85'	Stadium: Municipal; Attendance: 0 Referee: Florin Andrei (Târgu Mureș)

Group B

Pos	Team	Pld	W	D	L	GF	GA	GD	Pts	Promotion
1	Progresul Șomcuta Mare (MM) (P)	2	2	0	0	2	0	+2	6	Promotion to Liga III
2	Sportul Șimleu Silvaniei (SJ) (P)	2	1	0	1	0	2	−2	3	Possible promotion to Liga III
3	None (BN) (Note: As the season was suspended due to the COVID-19 pandemic, no team from Bistrița-Năsăud County expressed its interest to participate in the 2020–21 Liga III promotion play-off.)	2	0	0	2	0	0	0	0	

Source: FRF (in Romanian)
Rules for classification: 1) Points; 2) Head-to-head points; 3) Head-to-head goal difference; 4) Head-to-head goals scored; 5) Head-to-head away goals scored; 6) Goal difference; 7) Goals scored 8) Penalty kicks.
(P) Promoted
Notes:

Results

1 August 2020	None	0–3 (w/o)	Progresul Șomcuta Mare	Satu Mare
17:30 EEST (UTC+3)				Stadium: Daniel Prodan

5 August 2020	Sportul Șimleu Silvaniei	3–0 (w/o)	None	Satu Mare
17:30 EEST (UTC+3)				Stadium: Daniel Prodan

9 August 2020	Progresul Șomcuta Mare	2–0	Sportul Șimleu Silvaniei	Satu Mare
17:30 EEST (UTC+3)	Hauși 65'; Balmoș 74'			Stadium: Daniel Prodan; Attendance: 0 Referee: Florin Mazilu (Satu Mare)

=== Region 3 (Center) ===
Group A

Pos	Team	Pld	W	D	L	GF	GA	GD	Pts	Promotion
1	Unirea Ungheni (MS) (P)	2	2	0	0	8	1	+7	6	Promotion to Liga III
2	Măgura Cisnădie (SB) (P)	2	1	0	1	5	6	−1	3	Possible promotion to Liga III
3	Sepsi OSK II (CV)	2	0	0	2	0	6	−6	0	

Source: FRF (in Romanian)
Rules for classification: 1) Points; 2) Head-to-head points; 3) Head-to-head goal difference; 4) Head-to-head goals scored; 5) Head-to-head away goals scored; 6) Goal difference; 7) Goals scored 8) Penalty kicks.
(P) Promoted

Results

1 August 2020	Sepsi OSK II	0–2	Unirea Ungheni	Brașov
17:30 EEST (UTC+3)			Potor 47'; Iusan 85'	Stadium: Silviu Ploeșteanu; Attendance: 0 Referee: Marius Chițu (Târgoviște)

5 August 2020	Măgura Cisnădie	4–0	Sepsi OSK II	Brașov
17:30 EEST (UTC+3)	Stoia 5'; Bărculeț 8'; Armenean 60'; Dragomir 80'			Stadium: Silviu Ploeșteanu; Attendance: 0 Referee: Andrei Moroiță (Ploiești)

9 August 2020	Unirea Ungheni	6–1	Măgura Cisnădie	Brașov
17:30 EEST (UTC+3)				Stadium: Silviu Ploeșteanu; Attendance: 0 Referee: Andrei Antonie (Bucharest)

Group B

Pos	Team	Pld	W	D	L	GF	GA	GD	Pts	Promotion
1	Corona Brașov (BV) (P)	2	2	0	0	21	0	+21	6	Promotion to Liga III
2	Ocna Mureș (AB) (P)	2	1	0	1	9	6	+3	3	Possible promotion to Liga III
3	Gheorgheni (HR)	2	0	0	2	1	25	−24	0	

Source: FRF (in Romanian)
Rules for classification: 1) Points; 2) Head-to-head points; 3) Head-to-head goal difference; 4) Head-to-head goals scored; 5) Head-to-head away goals scored; 6) Goal difference; 7) Goals scored 8) Penalty kicks.
(P) Promoted

Results

1 August 2020	Corona Brașov	16–0	Gheorgheni	Ungheni
17:30 EEST (UTC+3)	Ad. Voicu 5', 36'; Roșu 9', 10'; Buga 12' (pen.), 32'; Forika 19'; Cristescu 45'; Damian 48', 54', 89', 90'; Manole 52', 77'; Alupoaie 72'; Constantinescu 82' (pen.)			Stadium: Central; Attendance: 0 Referee: Dan Dreve (Cluj-Napoca)

5 August 2020	Ocna Mureș	0–5	Corona Brașov	Ungheni
17:30 EEST (UTC+3)			Cristescu 19'; Damian 37', 52'; Ad. Voicu 70'; Ivan 82' (pen.)	Stadium: Central; Attendance: 0 Referee: Marius Omuț (Satu Mare)

9 August 2020	Gheorgheni	1–9	Ocna Mureș	Ungheni
17:30 EEST (UTC+3)	Szőcs 84'		Marcu 9', 90+1'; Chișu 13', 20' (pen.), 58'; Șumblea 40'; Csegöldi 43', 47', 80'	Stadium: Central; Attendance: 0 Referee: Rareș Vidican (Satu Mare)

=== Region 4 (West) ===
Group A

Pos	Team	Pld	W	D	L	GF	GA	GD	Pts	Promotion
1	Progresul Ezeriș (CS) (P)	2	1	1	0	4	1	+3	4	Promotion to Liga III
2	Știința Turceni (GJ) (Q)	2	1	0	1	3	4	−1	3	Possible promotion to Liga III
3	Victoria Zăbrani (AR)	2	0	1	1	2	4	−2	1	

Source: FRF (in Romanian)
Rules for classification: 1) Points; 2) Head-to-head points; 3) Head-to-head goal difference; 4) Head-to-head goals scored; 5) Head-to-head away goals scored; 6) Goal difference; 7) Goals scored 8) Penalty kicks.
(P) Promoted; (Q) Qualified for the phase indicated

Results

1 August 2020	Victoria Zăbrani	1–1 (1–2 p)	Progresul Ezeriș	Hunedoara
17:30 EEST (UTC+3)	Zele 74' (pen.)		Keda 50'	Stadium: Michael Klein; Attendance: 0 Referee: George Roman (Timișoara)

5 August 2020	Știința Turceni	3–1	Victoria Zăbrani	Hunedoara
17:30 EEST (UTC+3)	Simcea 29' (pen.), 88'; Șchiopu 90+1'		Topai 77'	Stadium: Michael Klein; Attendance: 0 Referee: Marius Chioran (Cluj-Napoca)

9 August 2020	Progresul Ezeriș	3–0	Știința Turceni	Hunedoara
17:30 EEST (UTC+3)	Rusnac 28'; Avramovici 53', 67'			Stadium: Michael Klein; Attendance: 0 Referee: Szabolcs Kovács (Carei)

Group B

Pos	Team	Pld	W	D	L	GF	GA	GD	Pts	Promotion
1	Avântul Periam (TM) (P)	2	2	0	0	3	0	+3	6	Promotion to Liga III
2	Jiul Petroșani (HD) (Note: Jiul Petroșani had a positive COVID-19 test inside its squad and lost by forfeit the match against Avântul Periam.) (P)	2	1	0	1	0	3	−3	3	Possible promotion to Liga III
3	Strehaia (MH) (Note: As the season was suspended due to the COVID-19 pandemic, Mehedinți County representative, Strehaia withdrew from the 2020–21 Liga III promotion play-off, due to the medical expenses needed to comply with the medical protocol.) (D)	2	0	0	2	0	0	0	0	Expelled

Source: FRF (in Romanian)
Rules for classification: 1) Points; 2) Head-to-head points; 3) Head-to-head goal difference; 4) Head-to-head goals scored; 5) Head-to-head away goals scored; 6) Goal difference; 7) Goals scored 8) Penalty kicks.
(D) Disqualified; (P) Promoted
Notes:

Results

1 August 2020	Strehaia	0–3 (w/o)	Avântul Periam	Lupac
17:30 EEST (UTC+3)				Stadium: Voința

5 August 2020	Jiul Petroșani	3–0 (w/o)	Strehaia	Lupac
17:30 EEST (UTC+3)				Stadium: Voința

9 August 2020	Avântul Periam	3–0 (w/o)	Jiul Petroșani	Lupac
17:30 EEST (UTC+3)				Stadium: Voința

=== Region 5 (South–West) ===
Group A

Pos	Team	Pld	W	D	L	GF	GA	GD	Pts	Promotion
1	Voința Budeasa (AG) (P)	2	2	0	0	7	0	+7	6	Promotion to Liga III
2	Roberto Ziduri (DB) (Q)	2	1	0	1	4	3	+1	3	Possible promotion to Liga III
3	Unirea Tricolor Dăbuleni (DJ)	2	0	0	2	0	8	−8	0	

Source: FRF (in Romanian)
Rules for classification: 1) Points; 2) Head-to-head points; 3) Head-to-head goal difference; 4) Head-to-head goals scored; 5) Head-to-head away goals scored; 6) Goal difference; 7) Goals scored 8) Penalty kicks.
(P) Promoted; (Q) Qualified for the phase indicated

Results

1 August 2020	Unirea Tricolor Dăbuleni	0–4	Voința Budeasa	Râmnicu Vâlcea
17:30 EEST (UTC+3)			Barbu; Marcu; Leca	Stadium: Municipal; Attendance: 0 Referee: Bogdan Dumitrache (Bucharest)

5 August 2020	Roberto Ziduri	4–0	Unirea Tricolor Dăbuleni	Râmnicu Vâlcea
17:30 EEST (UTC+3)	Niță 5'; Lețu 30'; Mirescu 44'; Costea 72'			Stadium: Municipal; Attendance: 0 Referee: Cătălin Buși (Rm. Vâlcea)

9 August 2020	Voința Budeasa	3–0	Roberto Ziduri	Râmnicu Vâlcea
17:30 EEST (UTC+3)	B. Stancu; Tameș; Marcu			Stadium: Municipal; Attendance: 0 Referee: Ionuț Coza (Cernica)

Group B

Pos	Team	Pld	W	D	L	GF	GA	GD	Pts	Promotion
1	Petrolul Potcoava (OT) (P)	2	2	0	0	3	0	+3	6	Promotion to Liga III
2	Minerul Costești (VL) (Note: Minerul Costești performed COVID-19 tests that were not approved by Romanian Football Federation and lost by forfeit the match against Petrolul Potcoava.) (Q)	2	1	0	1	0	3	−3	3	Possible promotion to Liga III
3	Unirea Țigănești (TR) (Note: As the season was suspended due to the COVID-19 pandemic, Teleorman County champion, Unirea Țigănești, withdrew from the promotion play-off, due to the medical expenses needed to comply with the medical protocol.) (D)	2	0	0	2	0	0	0	0	Expelled

Source: FRF (in Romanian)
Rules for classification: 1) Points; 2) Head-to-head points; 3) Head-to-head goal difference; 4) Head-to-head goals scored; 5) Head-to-head away goals scored; 6) Goal difference; 7) Goals scored 8) Penalty kicks.
(D) Disqualified; (P) Promoted; (Q) Qualified for the phase indicated
Notes:

Results

1 August 2020	Petrolul Potcoava	3–0 (w/o)	Minerul Costești	Bascov
17:30 EEST (UTC+3)				Stadium: Valea Ursului; Attendance: 0 Referee: Andrei Antonie (Bucharest)

5 August 2020	Unirea Țigănești	0–3 (w/o)	Petrolul Potcoava	Bascov
17:30 EEST (UTC+3)				Stadium: Valea Ursului

9 August 2020	Minerul Costești	3–0 (w/o)	Unirea Țigănești	Bascov
17:30 EEST (UTC+3)				Stadium: Valea Ursului

=== Region 6 (South) ===
Group A

Pos	Team	Pld	W	D	L	GF	GA	GD	Pts	Promotion
1	Oltenița (CL) (P)	2	1	1	0	3	2	+1	4	Promotion to Liga III
2	Plopeni (PH) (P)	2	1	1	0	3	2	+1	4	Possible promotion to Liga III
3	Viitorul Domnești (IF)	2	0	0	2	0	2	−2	0	

Source: FRF (in Romanian)
Rules for classification: 1) Points; 2) Head-to-head points; 3) Head-to-head goal difference; 4) Head-to-head goals scored; 5) Head-to-head away goals scored; 6) Goal difference; 7) Goals scored 8) Penalty kicks.
(P) Promoted

Results

1 August 2020	Oltenița	1–0	Viitorul Domnești	Buzău
17:30 EEST (UTC+3)	Alexa 29'			Stadium: Municipal; Attendance: 0 Referee: Andrei Baciu (Botoșani)

5 August 2020	Plopeni	2–2 (2–4 p)	Oltenița	Buzău
17:30 EEST (UTC+3)	Butufei 73'; Ciobanu 90+4'		Alexa 37'; Udrea 85'	Stadium: Municipal; Attendance: 0 Referee: Sorin Costreie (Buftea)

9 August 2020	Viitorul Domnești	0–1	Plopeni	Buzău
17:30 EEST (UTC+3)			Iancu 64'	Stadium: Municipal; Attendance: 0 Referee: Andrei Chivulete (Bucharest)

Group B

Pos	Team	Pld	W	D	L	GF	GA	GD	Pts	Promotion
1	Steaua București (B) (P)	2	2	0	0	14	1	+13	6	Promotion to Liga III
2	Bărăganul Ciulnița (IL) (Q)	2	1	0	1	3	6	−3	3	Possible promotion to Liga III
3	Argeșul Mihăilești (GR)	2	0	0	2	1	11	−10	0	

Source: FRF (in Romanian)
Rules for classification: 1) Points; 2) Head-to-head points; 3) Head-to-head goal difference; 4) Head-to-head goals scored; 5) Head-to-head away goals scored; 6) Goal difference; 7) Goals scored 8) Penalty kicks.
(P) Promoted; (Q) Qualified for the phase indicated

Results

1 August 2020	Steaua București	8–1	Argeșul Mihăilești	Modelu
17:30 EEST (UTC+3)	Morariu 2'; Bărbulescu 34'; Răsdan 53'; Băjenaru 55'; Antohi 62', 72'; Nițu 78'; Robu 90+2'		Rotaru 22'	Stadium: Vasile Enache; Attendance: 0 Referee: Adrian Illyeș (Ploiești)

5 August 2020	Bărăganul Ciulnița	0–6	Steaua București	Modelu
17:30 EEST (UTC+3)			Neagoe 15', 21'; Antohi 28'; Băjenaru 42', 44'; Enceanu 76'	Stadium: Vasile Enache; Attendance: 0 Referee: Florin Dan (Chirnogi)

9 August 2020	Argeșul Mihăilești	0–3 (forfeit)	Bărăganul Ciulnița	Modelu
17:30 EEST (UTC+3)				Stadium: Vasile Enache

=== Region 7 (South–East) ===
Group A

Pos	Team	Pld	W	D	L	GF	GA	GD	Pts	Promotion
1	Sportul Chiscani (BR) (P)	2	1	1	0	4	3	+1	4	Promotion to Liga III
2	Avântul Valea Mărului (GL) (P)	2	1	1	0	2	1	+1	4	Possible promotion to Liga III
3	Victoria Gugești (VN)	2	0	0	2	4	6	−2	0	

Source: FRF (in Romanian)
Rules for classification: 1) Points; 2) Head-to-head points; 3) Head-to-head goal difference; 4) Head-to-head goals scored; 5) Head-to-head away goals scored; 6) Goal difference; 7) Goals scored 8) Penalty kicks.
(P) Promoted

Results

1 August 2020	Victoria Gugești	1–2	Avântul Valea Mărului	Râmnicu Sărat
17:30 EEST (UTC+3)	Bălosu 83'		Ignat 29'; A. Frunză 74'	Stadium: Municipal; Attendance: 0 Referee: Claudiu Marcu (Constanța)

5 August 2020	Sportul Chiscani	4–3	Victoria Gugești	Râmnicu Sărat
17:30 EEST (UTC+3)	Pascu 13' (pen.); Simion 37'; Bolozan 47'; Pârlițeanu 58'; Mihăilă 39'; Apenciucesei 65'; D. Popa 72'			Stadium: Municipal; Attendance: 0 Referee: Mihai Amorăriței (Câmpina)

9 August 2020	Avântul Valea Mărului	0–0 (5–4 p)	Sportul Chiscani	Râmnicu Sărat
17:30 EEST (UTC+3)				Stadium: Municipal; Attendance: 0 Referee: Lucian Rusandu (Sf. Gheorghe)

Group B

Pos	Team	Pld	W	D	L	GF	GA	GD	Pts	Promotion
1	Gloria Albești (CT) (P)	2	1	1	0	0	0	0	4	Promotion to Liga III
2	Râmnicu Sărat (BZ) (P)	2	1	1	0	0	0	0	4	Possible promotion to Liga III
3	Pescărușul Sarichioi (TL) (Note: As the season was suspended due to the COVID-19 pandemic, Tulcea County champion, Pescărușul Sarichioi, withdrew from the promotion play-off, due to the medical expenses needed to comply with the medical protocol.) (D)	2	0	0	2	0	0	0	0	Expelled

Source: FRF (in Romanian)
Rules for classification: 1) Points; 2) Head-to-head points; 3) Head-to-head goal difference; 4) Head-to-head goals scored; 5) Head-to-head away goals scored; 6) Goal difference; 7) Goals scored 8) Penalty kicks.
(D) Disqualified; (P) Promoted
Notes:

Results

1 August 2020	Gloria Albești	0–0 (4–3 p)	Râmnicu Sărat	Galați
17:30 EEST (UTC+3)				Stadium: Oțelul; Attendance: 0 Referee: Ionuț Coza (Cernica)

5 August 2020	Pescărușul Sarichioi	0–3 (w/o)	Gloria Albești	Galați
17:30 EEST (UTC+3)				Stadium: Oțelul

9 August 2020	Râmnicu Sărat	3–0 (w/o)	Pescărușul Sarichioi	Galați
17:30 EEST (UTC+3)				Stadium: Oțelul

=== Possible promotion ===
At the end of the promotion tournament, a special table was made between 2nd places from the 14 groups. The first 7 teams in this table were also promoted in the Liga III.

Pos	Team	Pld	W	D	L	GF	GA	GD	Pts	Promotion
1	Plopeni (P)	2	1	1	0	3	2	+1	4	Promotion to Liga III
2	Avântul Valea Mărului (P)	2	1	1	0	2	1	+1	4	Promotion to Liga III
3	Râmnicu Sărat (P)	2	1	1	0	0	0	0	4	Promotion to Liga III
4	Ocna Mureș (P)	2	1	0	1	9	6	+3	3	Promotion to Liga III
5	Măgura Cisnădie (P)	2	1	0	1	5	6	−1	3	Promotion to Liga III
6	Sportul Șimleu Silvaniei (P)	2	1	0	1	0	2	−2	3	Promotion to Liga III
7	Bărăganul Ciulnița (Note: Bărăganul Ciulnița did not enrolled in Liga III.) (P)	2	1	0	1	0	6	−6	3	Promotion to Liga III
8	Sporting Juniorul Vaslui (Note: Sporting Juniorul Vaslui, CA Oradea, Jiul Petroșani and Minerul Costești were admitted to Liga III to fill the vacancy places.)	2	1	0	1	4	2	+2	3	
9	Roberto Ziduri	2	1	0	1	4	3	+1	3	
10	CA Oradea	2	1	0	1	3	4	−1	3	
11	Știința Turceni	2	1	0	1	3	4	−1	3	
12	Jiul Petroșani	2	1	0	1	0	3	−3	3	
13	Minerul Costești	2	1	0	1	0	3	−3	3	
14	Siretul Dolhasca	2	0	1	1	1	4	−3	1	

Source: FRF (in Romanian)
Rules for classification: 1) Points; 2) Fair-play (1 point for yellow card, 3 points for red cards).
(P) Promoted

== League standings ==
=== Alba County ===
Team changes from the previous season

- CS Ocna Mureș was relegated from Liga III.
- Performanța Ighiu (Series I winners) and CSU Alba Iulia (Series II winners) were promoted from Liga V Alba.
- Metalul Aiud (13th place) and Dacia Mihalț (14th place) were relegated to Liga V Alba.
- Inter Unirea was admitted upon request.
- Sportul Petrești withdrew due to financial problems.

Pos	Team	Pld	W	D	L	GF	GA	GD	Pts	Qualification or relegation
1	Ocna Mureș (C, Q)	16	14	2	0	72	14	+58	44	Qualification to promotion play-off
2	CSU Alba Iulia	16	12	3	1	43	13	+30	39	
3	Voința Stremț	16	10	2	4	52	21	+31	32	
4	Performanța Ighiu	15	10	1	4	40	15	+25	31	
5	Spicul Daia Romană	16	8	4	4	31	19	+12	28	
6	Inter Unirea	16	9	0	7	52	34	+18	27	
7	CIL Blaj	16	8	3	5	33	24	+9	27	
8	Olimpia Aiud	16	5	4	7	27	32	−5	19	
9	Viitorul Vama Seacă	16	6	1	9	29	41	−12	19	
10	Micești	16	6	1	9	25	42	−17	19	
11	Zlatna	16	5	1	10	33	43	−10	16	
12	Viitorul Sântimbru	15	4	3	8	30	27	+3	15	
13	Nicolae Linca Cergău	16	3	3	10	25	51	−26	12	
14	Energia Săsciori	16	2	5	9	23	44	−21	11	
15	Navobi Alba Iulia	16	0	1	15	18	113	−95	1	

Updated to match(es) played on 1 March 2020. Source:
Rules for classification: 1) Points; 2) Head-to-head points; 3) Head-to-head goal difference; 4) Head-to-head goals scored; 5) Head-to-head away goals scored; 6) Goal difference; 7) Goals scored.
(C) Champions; (Q) Qualified for the phase indicated

=== Arad County ===
Team changes from the previous season

- Progresul Pecica achieved promotion to Liga III.
- Speranța Turnu (14th place) and Victoria Nădlac (15th place) were relegated to Liga V Arad.
- CS Beliu (Series B winners) was promoted from Liga V Arad.
- Cetate Săvârșin and Semlecana Semlac (Liga V Arad Series A winners) withdrew due to financial problems.

Pos	Team	Pld	W	D	L	GF	GA	GD	Pts	Qualification or relegation
1	Victoria Zăbrani (C, Q)	15	13	1	1	40	6	+34	40	Qualification to promotion play-off
2	Frontiera Curtici	15	12	2	1	53	11	+42	38	
3	Păulișana Păuliș	15	8	4	3	33	25	+8	28	
4	Unirea Sântana	15	8	3	4	40	16	+24	27	
5	Ineu	15	8	2	5	35	26	+9	26	
6	Șoimii Șimand	15	8	1	6	38	36	+2	25	
7	Glogovăț	15	6	1	8	21	31	−10	19	
8	Victoria Felnac	15	5	3	7	23	25	−2	18	
9	Beliu	15	4	2	9	30	39	−9	14	
10	Socodor	15	4	0	11	26	38	−12	12	
11	Podgoria Pâncota	15	3	2	10	23	48	−25	11	
12	UTA Arad II	15	0	1	14	19	80	−61	1	

Updated to match(es) played on 23 November 2019. Source:
Rules for classification: 1) Points; 2) Head-to-head points; 3) Head-to-head goal difference; 4) Head-to-head goals scored; 5) Head-to-head away goals scored; 6) Goal difference; 7) Goals scored.
(C) Champions; (Q) Qualified for the phase indicated

=== Argeș County ===
Team changes from the previous season

- Viitorul Ștefănești (15th place) was relegated to Liga V Argeș.
- Vulturii Priboieni (Center I Series winners) and AS Rucăr (North Series winners) were promoted from Liga V Argeș.
- Star Sport Argeș (Center II Series winners) and Rapid Pitești (South Series winners) declined promotion from Liga V Argeș.
- AS Băiculești withdrew.
- AF Muscelul Câmpulung, FC Dănuț Coman, CS Recea and Aripi Pitești were admitted upon request.

Pos	Team	Pld	W	D	L	GF	GA	GD	Pts	Qualification or relegation
1	Voința Budeasa (C, Q)	22	20	1	1	97	16	+81	61	Qualification to promotion play-off
2	Real Bradu	22	20	0	2	81	17	+64	60	
3	Muscelul Câmpulung	20	17	2	1	92	12	+80	53	
4	Vulturii Priboieni	22	16	2	4	86	40	+46	50	
5	Mioveni II	21	12	4	5	84	51	+33	40	
6	Rucăr	22	13	0	9	78	39	+39	39	
7	Costești	22	12	3	7	45	54	−9	39	
8	Colibași	21	11	4	6	72	38	+34	37	
9	Poiana Lacului	22	11	4	7	65	58	+7	37	
10	Victoria Buzoești	22	10	5	7	50	42	+8	35	
11	Juventus Bascov	22	9	1	12	64	61	+3	28	
12	Sporting Pitești	22	7	3	12	44	52	−8	24	
13	Gloria Berevoești	22	8	0	14	38	74	−36	24	
14	Argeș Pitești II	22	7	2	13	61	70	−9	23	
15	Basarabi Curtea de Argeș	22	7	1	14	40	84	−44	22	
16	DLR Pitești	22	4	4	14	31	61	−30	16	
17	Suseni	22	5	1	16	42	94	−52	16	
18	Recea	22	5	0	17	37	78	−41	15	
19	Aripi Pitești	22	3	1	18	27	92	−65	10	
20	FC Dănuț Coman	22	2	0	20	31	132	−101	6	

Updated to match(es) played on 8 March 2020. Source:
Rules for classification: 1) Points; 2) Head-to-head points; 3) Head-to-head goal difference; 4) Head-to-head goals scored; 5) Head-to-head away goals scored; 6) Goal difference; 7) Goals scored.
(C) Champions; (Q) Qualified for the phase indicated

=== Bacău County ===
Team changes from the previous season

- CSM Bacău achieved promotion to Liga III.
- Atletico Junior Bacău, Lumina Itești, Viitorul Berești-Tazlău and Biruința Letea Veche Bacău withdrew.
- FCM Bacău, Rapid Bacău, Gauss Bacău, AS Căiuți and Bradul Mânăstirea Cașin were admitted upon request.
- Zorile Faraoani was renamed CS Faraoani.

Bacău Series

Pos	Team	Pld	W	D	L	GF	GA	GD	Pts	Qualification
1	Dinamo Bacău (Q)	15	14	0	1	70	10	+60	42	Qualification to championship final
2	FCM Bacău	15	13	1	1	71	13	+58	40	
3	Voința Gârleni	15	12	1	2	46	19	+27	37	
4	Filipești	15	8	3	4	59	29	+30	27	
5	Negri	15	8	0	7	34	34	0	24	
6	Viitorul Nicolae Bălcescu	15	7	2	6	46	34	+12	23	
7	Siretul Bacău	15	6	2	7	40	40	0	20	
8	Faraoani	15	4	2	9	22	50	−28	14	
9	Rapid Bacău	15	3	3	9	16	42	−26	12	
10	Flamura Roșie Sascut	15	3	2	10	21	57	−36	11	
11	Aripile Cleja	15	2	1	12	25	68	−43	7	
12	Gauss Bacău	15	1	1	13	17	71	−54	4	

Updated to match(es) played on 8 March 2020. Source:
Rules for classification: 1) Points; 2) Head-to-head points; 3) Head-to-head goal difference; 4) Head-to-head goals scored; 5) Head-to-head away goals scored; 6) Goal difference; 7) Goals scored.
(Q) Qualified for the phase indicated

Valea Trotușului Series

Pos	Team	Pld	W	D	L	GF	GA	GD	Pts	Qualification
1	Viitorul Curița (Q)	15	13	2	0	77	11	+66	41	Qualification to championship final
2	Voința Oituz	15	11	3	1	57	12	+45	36	
3	Moinești	15	9	3	3	53	27	+26	30	
4	Gloria Zemeș	15	9	2	4	51	34	+17	29	
5	Bârsănești	15	7	5	3	54	38	+16	26	
6	Uzu Dărmănești	15	8	1	6	39	32	+7	25	
7	Căiuți	15	5	2	8	34	52	−18	17	
8	Dofteana	15	5	1	9	33	55	−22	16	
9	Măgura Cașin	15	4	1	10	24	51	−27	13	
10	Viitorul Urechești	15	4	0	11	36	69	−33	12	
11	Vulturul Măgirești	15	3	2	10	36	51	−15	11	
12	Bradul Mânăstirea Cașin	15	0	2	13	18	80	−62	2	

Updated to match(es) played on 8 March 2020. Source:
Rules for classification: 1) Points; 2) Head-to-head points; 3) Head-to-head goal difference; 4) Head-to-head goals scored; 5) Head-to-head away goals scored; 6) Goal difference; 7) Goals scored.
(Q) Qualified for the phase indicated

Championship final

Team 1	Agg.	Team 2	1st leg	2nd leg
Dinamo Bacău	2–3	Viitorul Curița	1–0	1–3

19 July 2020	Viitorul Curița	0–1	Dinamo Bacău	Târgu Ocna
11:00 EEST (UTC+3)		Report	Lupu 90+3' (pen.)	Stadium: Orășenesc; Attendance: 0 Referee: Sergiu Mavriche (Bacău)

26 July 2020	Dinamo Bacău	1–3	Viitorul Curița	Săucești
11:00 EEST (UTC+3)	Boghian 44'	Report	Gîză 9'; Chiriac 57', 71'	Stadium: Siretul; Attendance: 0 Referee: Sergiu Mavriche (Bacău)

Viitorul Curița won the Liga IV Bacău County and qualified for the promotion play-off in Liga III.

=== Bihor County ===
Team changes from the previous season

- CSC Sânmartin achieved promotion to Liga III.
- Dacia Gepiu (16th place) was relegated to Liga V Bihor.
- CSC Sânmartin II (Series I winners) and Foresta Tileagd (Series I runners-up and promotion/relegation play-offs winners) were promoted from Liga V Bihor.
- Biharea Marmogranit Vașcău (Series II winners) and Unirea Roșia (Series II runners-up and promotion/relegation play-offs winners) declined promotion from Liga V Bihor.
- Bihorul Beiuș (13th place and promotion/relegation play-offs losers), Olimpia Salonta (14th place and promotion/relegation play-offs losers) and CS Săcueni (15th place) were spared from relegation.
- CS Săcueni was renamed Vulturii Săcueni.

Pos	Team	Pld	W	D	L	GF	GA	GD	Pts	Qualification
1	CA Oradea (C, Q)	15	15	0	0	69	6	+63	45	Qualification to promotion play-off
2	Viitorul Borș	16	12	2	2	60	20	+40	38	
3	Crișul Sântandrei	15	10	1	4	36	20	+16	31	
4	Ștei	15	10	1	4	31	16	+15	31	
5	Unirea Livada	15	9	1	5	28	19	+9	28	
6	Unirea Valea lui Mihai	15	9	0	6	37	33	+4	27	
7	Universitatea Oradea	15	7	2	6	32	21	+11	23	
8	Oșorhei	15	7	1	7	34	31	+3	22	
9	Diosig	15	6	1	8	30	45	−15	19	
10	Sânmartin II	15	5	1	9	22	34	−12	16	
11	Mădăras	15	5	1	9	23	47	−24	16	
12	Olimpia Salonta	15	4	1	10	22	34	−12	13	
13	Foresta Tileagd	15	3	4	8	26	43	−17	13	Spared from relegation
14	Bihorul Beiuș	16	4	1	11	25	53	−28	13	Spared from relegation
15	Vulturii Săcueni	15	3	1	11	16	44	−28	10	Spared from relegation
16	Crișul Aleșd	15	3	0	12	20	45	−25	9	Spared from relegation

Updated to match(es) played on 7 March 2020. Source:
Rules for classification: 1) Points; 2) Head-to-head points; 3) Head-to-head goal difference; 4) Head-to-head goals scored; 5) Head-to-head away goals scored; 6) Goal difference; 7) Goals scored.
(C) Champions; (Q) Qualified for the phase indicated

=== Bistrița-Năsăud County ===
Team changes from the previous season

- Săgeata Dumbrăvița (winners) was promoted from Liga V Bistrița-Năsăud.
- Voința Cetate withdrew.
- Academia Gloria Bistrița and Viitorul Lechința withdrew during the previous season.
- Progresul Tăure and Voința Mărișelu were admitted upon request.

South Series

Pos	Team	Pld	W	D	L	GF	GA	GD	Pts	Qualification
1	Progresul Năsăud	10	8	0	2	38	15	+23	24	Qualification to championship play-off
2	Atletico Monor	10	7	0	3	35	25	+10	21	Qualification to championship play-off
3	Voința Livezile	11	5	1	5	27	30	−3	16	Qualification to championship play-off
4	Progresul Tăure	10	4	2	4	27	27	0	14	Qualification to championship play-off
5	Voința Mărișelu	10	4	1	5	29	32	−3	13	Qualification to championship play-out
6	Săgeata Dumbrăvița	9	2	1	6	14	23	−9	7	Qualification to championship play-out
7	Real Teaca	10	2	1	7	13	31	−18	7	Qualification to championship play-out
8	Dumitra (Note: Dumitra withdrew after the first round and the result was canceled)	0	0	0	0	0	0	0	0	Withdrew

Updated to match(es) played on 24 November 2019. Source:
Rules for classification: 1) Points; 2) Head-to-head points; 3) Head-to-head goal difference; 4) Head-to-head goals scored; 5) Head-to-head away goals scored; 6) Goal difference; 7) Goals scored.
Notes:

North Series

Pos	Team	Pld	W	D	L	GF	GA	GD	Pts	Qualification
1	Silvicultorul Maieru	11	9	1	1	51	20	+31	28	Qualification to championship play-off
2	Heniu Leșu	11	9	0	2	42	22	+20	27	Qualification to championship play-off
3	Minerul Rodna	12	8	1	3	32	16	+16	25	Qualification to championship play-off
4	Someșul Feldru	12	6	0	6	33	37	−4	18	Qualification to championship play-off
5	Hebe Sângeorz-Băi	12	4	2	6	31	38	−7	14	Qualification to championship play-out
6	Eciro Forest Telciu	12	3	1	8	24	38	−14	10	Qualification to championship play-out
7	Someșul Rebrișoara	12	2	3	7	27	40	−13	9	Qualification to championship play-out
8	Spicul Salva	12	1	2	9	17	46	−29	5	Qualification to championship play-out

Updated to match(es) played on 24 November 2019. Source:
Rules for classification: 1) Points; 2) Head-to-head points; 3) Head-to-head goal difference; 4) Head-to-head goals scored; 5) Head-to-head away goals scored; 6) Goal difference; 7) Goals scored.

Championship play-off

As the season was abandoned and no team expressed interest in participating in the promotion play-off, no team was declared county champion.

=== Botoșani County ===
Team changes from the previous season

- Europa Hilișeu (13th place) and Viitorul Blândești (14th place) were relegated to Liga V Botoșani.
- Independentul Darabani (North Series winners) and Dante Botoșani (South Series winners) were promoted from Liga V Botoșani.

Pos	Team	Pld	W	D	L	GF	GA	GD	Pts	Qualification
1	Dante Botoșani (C, Q)	14	13	0	1	50	9	+41	39	Qualification to promotion play-off
2	Viitorul Albești	14	11	0	3	42	18	+24	33	
3	Independentul Darabani	14	9	1	4	54	25	+29	28	
4	Sportivul Trușești	14	8	0	6	27	27	0	24	
5	Bucecea	14	7	1	6	36	23	+13	22	
6	Unirea Săveni	14	5	4	5	29	36	−7	19	
7	TransDor Tudora	14	5	4	5	23	31	−8	19	
8	Voința Șendriceni	14	5	2	7	19	26	−7	17	
9	Inter Dorohoi	14	5	1	8	36	48	−12	16	
10	Unirea Curtești	14	4	3	7	38	38	0	15	
11	Prosport Vârfu Câmpului	14	4	2	8	27	41	−14	14	
12	Flacăra Văculești	14	4	2	8	23	51	−28	14	
13	Flacăra 1907 Flămânzi	14	4	1	9	40	56	−16	13	
14	Rapid Ungureni	14	3	1	10	36	51	−15	10	

Updated to match(es) played on 17 November 2019. Source:
Rules for classification: 1) Points; 2) Head-to-head points; 3) Head-to-head goal difference; 4) Head-to-head goals scored; 5) Head-to-head away goals scored; 6) Goal difference; 7) Goals scored.
(C) Champions; (Q) Qualified for the phase indicated

=== Brașov County ===
Team changes from the previous season

- Cetățenii Ghimbav (Brașov Series winners) was promoted from Liga V Brașov.
- Partizan Ileni (Făgăraș East Series winners) and Progresul Voivodeni (Făgăraș West Series winners) from Liga V Brașov declined promotion.
- Prietenii Rupea and Olimpic Voila were spared from relegation.
- Corona Brașov was admitted upon request.
- AFC Hărman withdrew from Liga III and enrolled upon request in Liga IV Brașov.

Pos	Team	Pld	W	D	L	GF	GA	GD	Pts	Qualification or relegation
1	Precizia Săcele (Q)	16	14	1	1	68	12	+56	43	Qualification to championship play-off
2	Corona Brașov (Q)	16	14	0	2	86	3	+83	42	Qualification to championship play-off
3	Colțea Brașov (Q)	16	13	1	2	46	9	+37	40	Qualification to championship play-off
4	Ciucaș Târlungeni	16	10	2	4	38	15	+23	32	
5	Codlea	15	10	1	4	39	20	+19	31	
6	Chimia Victoria	16	9	2	5	39	24	+15	29	
7	Olimpic Zărnești	16	8	3	5	32	21	+11	27	
8	Steagu Roșu Brașov	16	7	3	6	34	37	−3	24	
9	Hărman	15	7	1	7	35	22	+13	22	
10	Prejmer	16	7	1	8	34	33	+1	22	
11	Inter Cristian	16	6	4	6	24	28	−4	22	
12	Cetățenii Ghimbav	16	4	0	12	34	54	−20	12	
13	Cetatea Homorod	16	3	2	11	33	51	−18	11	
14	Aripile Brașov	16	2	2	12	21	59	−38	8	
15	Prietenii Rupea	16	1	1	14	10	56	−46	4	
16	Olimpic Voila	16	0	0	16	13	142	−129	0	
17	Carpați Berivoi (Note: Carpați Berivoi withdrew after 8 rounds and all its results were canceled.)	0	0	0	0	0	0	0	0	Withdrew

Updated to match(es) played on 7 March 2020. Source:
Rules for classification: 1) Points; 2) Head-to-head points; 3) Head-to-head goal difference; 4) Head-to-head goals scored; 5) Head-to-head away goals scored; 6) Goal difference; 7) Goals scored.
(Q) Qualified for the phase indicated
Notes:

Championship play-off

A championship play-off tournament between the best three teams (after 16 rounds) was played to decide the county champion and the team that will qualify for promotion play-off to Liga III. The teams started with all the records accumulated until the interruption of the regular season.

Pos	Team	Pld	W	D	L	GF	GA	GD	Pts	Qualification
1	Corona Brașov (C, Q)	18	16	0	2	91	4	+87	48	Qualification to promotion play-off
2	Colțea Brașov	18	14	1	3	53	11	+42	43	
3	Precizia Săcele (Note: Precizia Săcele was excluded from the play-off due to COVID-19 cases inside the squad.)	18	14	1	3	68	18	+50	43	

Rules for classification: 1) Points; 2) Points without rounding; 3) Head-to-head points; 4) Head-to-head goal difference; 5) Head-to-head goals scored; 6) Goal difference; 7) Goals scored;
(C) Champions; (Q) Qualified for the phase indicated
Notes:

Results

18 July 2020	Corona Brașov	2–1	Colțea Brașov	Brașov
17:30 EEST (UTC+3)	Damian 24'; C. Székely 36' (o.g.)	Report	Turcu 77'	Stadium: Silviu Ploieșteanu; Attendance: 0 Referee: Robert Mormeci (Brașov)

22 July 2020	Precizia Săcele	0–3 (w/o)	Corona Brașov	Brașov
17:30 EEST (UTC+3)		Report		Stadium: Silviu Ploieșteanu

26 July 2020	Colțea Brașov	3–0 (w/o)	Precizia Săcele	Brașov
17:30 EEST (UTC+3)		Report		Stadium: Silviu Ploieșteanu

=== Brăila County ===
Team changes from the previous season

- Viitorul Ianca achieved promotion to Liga III.
- Sportul Chiscani was relegated from Liga III.
- Dunărea Tichilești (9th place) was relegated to Liga V Brăila.
- Voința Plopu (Series III runners-up, 1st in the play-off), Dinamic Unirea (Series I winners, 3rd in the play-off) and Dacia Bertești (Series I runners-up, 5th in the play-off) were promoted from Liga V Brăila.
- FC Urleasca withdrew.
- Dacia Unirea Brăila II was admitted upon request.

Pos	Team	Pld	W	D	L	GF	GA	GD	Pts	Qualification
1	Victoria Traian (Q)	16	14	2	0	92	11	+81	44	Qualification to championship final
2	Sportul Chiscani (O)	15	14	1	0	78	7	+71	43	Qualification to championship final
3	Viitorul Însurăței	16	13	0	3	54	38	+16	39	
4	Comunal Cazasu	16	9	1	6	60	39	+21	28	
5	Viitorul Șuțești	15	9	0	6	52	20	+32	27	
6	Voința Vișani	15	8	0	7	41	26	+15	24	
7	Voința Plopu	15	6	0	9	34	59	−25	18	
8	Pandurii Tudor Vladimirescu	16	3	1	12	30	72	−42	10	
9	Dacia Unirea Brăila II	15	3	0	12	20	82	−62	9	
10	Dacia Bertești	15	2	1	12	19	70	−51	7	
11	Dinamic Unirea	16	1	0	15	21	77	−56	3	

Updated to match(es) played on 7 March 2020. Source:
Rules for classification: 1) Points; 2) Head-to-head points; 3) Head-to-head goal difference; 4) Head-to-head goals scored; 5) Head-to-head away goals scored; 6) Goal difference; 7) Goals scored.
(O) Play-off winners; (Q) Qualified for the phase indicated

Championship final

In order to determine the champion and the representative of the county to promotion play-off, a championship final was played between the first two teams in the league table.

Team 1	Agg.	Team 2	1st leg	2nd leg
Victoria Traian	2–4	Sportul Chiscani	1–4	1–0

22 July 2020	Victoria Traian	1–4	Sportul Chiscani	Traian
18:00 EEST (UTC+3)	A. Ion 83'	Report	Simion 31'; Pascu 45'; Crăciun 58'; Bolozan 90+5'	Stadium: Mircea Ceicu; Attendance: 0 Referee: Viorel Cojocaru (Galați)

25 July 2020	Sportul Chiscani	0–1	Victoria Traian	Chiscani
11:00 EEST (UTC+3)		Report	Moldoveanu 45'	Stadium: Comunal; Attendance: 0 Referee: Marius Marchidanu (Brăila)

Sportul Chiscani won the Liga IV Brăila County and qualified for the promotion play-off in Liga III.

=== Bucharest ===
Team changes from the previous season

- LPS Mircea Eliade (15th place; withdrew) and Vis de București (16th place; withdrew) were relegated to Liga V Bucharest.
- Power Team București (Series I winners), Rapid FNG București (Series II winners) and Sportivii București (Series II runners-up) were promoted from Liga V Bucharest.
- Tricolor București, Real Crângași București and Carmen București withdrew before the start of the season.
- Rapid București II and Electrica București were admitted upon request.

Pos	Team	Pld	W	D	L	GF	GA	GD	Pts	Qualification or relegation
1	Steaua București (C, Q)	18	18	0	0	156	5	+151	54	Qualification to promotion play-off
2	Rapid București II	18	15	2	1	65	17	+48	47	
3	Bucharest United	18	15	1	2	103	12	+91	46	
4	Progresul 2005 București	18	13	1	4	65	24	+41	40	
5	Asalt București	18	13	1	4	40	26	+14	40	
6	Metaloglobus București II	18	8	1	9	32	34	−2	25	
7	ACS FC Dinamo București	18	7	2	9	44	58	−14	23	
8	Comprest GIM București	18	7	2	9	29	51	−22	23	
9	Victoria București	18	7	2	9	45	69	−24	23	
10	Rapid FNG București	18	7	1	10	35	48	−13	22	
11	Sportivii București	18	7	1	10	36	60	−24	22	
12	Unirea Politehnica București	18	6	1	11	36	61	−25	19	
13	Power Team București	18	4	3	11	33	63	−30	15	
14	AFC Rapid București	18	4	3	11	26	60	−34	15	
15	Romprim București	18	2	1	15	22	70	−48	7	
16	Electrica București	18	0	0	18	11	120	−109	0	

Updated to match(es) played on 6 March 2020. Source:
Rules for classification: 1) Points; 2) Head-to-head points; 3) Head-to-head goal difference; 4) Head-to-head goals scored; 5) Head-to-head away goals scored; 6) Goal difference; 7) Goals scored.
(C) Champions; (Q) Qualified for the phase indicated

=== Buzău County ===
Team changes from the previous season

- CSM Râmnicu Sărat was relegated from Liga III.
- Liceul Teoretic "Ștefan Cel Mare" Râmnicu Sărat (14th place, promotion/relegation play-off losers) and Viitorul 08 Vernești (16th place) were relegated to Liga V Buzău.
- Fortius-Partizanul Merei (Series I winners), Gloria Vadu Pașii (Series II winners), Unirea Stâlpu (Series I runners-up, promotion/relegation play-off winners) and Voința Limpeziș (Series II runners-up, promotion/relegation play-off winners) were promoted from Liga V Buzău.
- AS Balta Albă withdrew.
- Recolta Blăjani (13th place, promotion/relegation play-off losers) and Săhăteni Vintileanca (15th place) were spared from relegation.
- Petrolul Viitorul Berca was renamed Viitorul Berca.

Pos	Team	Pld	W	D	L	GF	GA	GD	Pts	Qualification or relegation
1	Râmnicu Sărat (C, Q)	20	17	2	1	92	15	+77	53	Qualification to promotion play-off
2	Voința Lanurile	20	17	1	2	104	12	+92	52	
3	Team Săgeata	20	16	0	4	66	26	+40	48	
4	Gloria Vadu Pașii	20	13	1	6	60	35	+25	40	
5	Fortius-Partizanul Merei	20	13	2	5	59	27	+32	41	
6	Voința Limpeziș	20	11	2	7	74	45	+29	35	
7	Montana Pătârlagele	20	10	4	6	57	33	+24	34	
8	Avântul Zărnești	19	10	4	5	63	28	+35	34	
9	Recolta Sălcioara	20	9	4	7	57	37	+20	31	
10	Viitorul Berca	20	8	3	9	36	47	−11	27	
11	Unirea Stâlpu	20	7	3	10	48	69	−21	24	
12	Înfrățirea Zoița	20	5	4	11	37	43	−6	19	
13	Șoimii Siriu	18	6	0	12	33	83	−50	18	
14	Phoenix Poșta Câlnău	19	4	5	10	26	46	−20	17	
15	Locomotiva Buzău	20	3	3	14	25	80	−55	12	
16	Săhăteni Vintileanca	20	3	1	16	27	117	−90	10	
17	Diadema Gherăseni	20	2	3	15	25	87	−62	9	
18	Recolta Blăjani	20	2	2	16	32	91	−59	8	

Updated to match(es) played on 7 March 2020. Source:
Rules for classification: 1) Points; 2) Head-to-head points; 3) Head-to-head goal difference; 4) Head-to-head goals scored; 5) Head-to-head away goals scored; 6) Goal difference; 7) Goals scored.
(C) Champions; (Q) Qualified for the phase indicated

=== Caraș-Severin County ===
Team changes from the previous season

- Viitorul Caransebeș withdrew.
- Steaua Prigor, Magica Caransebeș, Ad Mediam Mehadia, Bistra Glimboca, Era S Comexim Caransebeș and Agmonia Zăvoi were admitted upon request.

Oravița Zone

Pos	Team	Pld	W	D	L	GF	GA	GD	Pts	Qualification or relegation
1	Progresul Ezeriș (Q)	13	13	0	0	50	11	+39	39	Qualification to championship play-off
2	Voința Lupac (Q)	12	11	0	1	88	7	+81	33	Qualification to championship play-off
3	Moldova Nouă	13	8	1	4	41	35	+6	25	
4	Metalul Bocșa	14	7	0	7	30	33	−3	21	
5	Anina	14	6	1	7	49	45	+4	19	
6	Oravița	13	4	2	7	51	27	+24	14	
7	Croația Clocotici (Note: Croația Clocotici withdrew after 11 rounds and lost all remaining matches with 0–3.)	16	4	0	12	22	45	−23	12	
8	Nera Bozovici	12	4	0	8	17	41	−24	12	
9	Steaua Prigor	13	1	0	12	19	123	−104	3	

Updated to match(es) played on 8 March 2020. Source:
Rules for classification: 1) Points; 2) Head-to-head points; 3) Head-to-head goal difference; 4) Head-to-head goals scored; 5) Head-to-head away goals scored; 6) Goal difference; 7) Goals scored.
(Q) Qualified for the phase indicated
Notes:

Caransebeș Zone

Pos	Team	Pld	W	D	L	GF	GA	GD	Pts	Qualification or relegation
1	Rapid Buchin (Q)	13	10	1	2	48	15	+33	31	Qualification to championship play-off
2	Șoimii Oțelu Roșu (Q)	12	8	3	1	43	16	+27	27	Qualification to championship play-off
3	Magica Caransebeș	12	9	0	3	35	18	+17	27	
4	Slatina-Timiș	13	8	1	4	51	26	+25	25	
5	Ad Mediam Mehadia	13	6	1	6	27	29	−2	19	
6	Bistra Glimboca	13	5	0	8	37	45	−8	15	
7	Foresta Armeniș	12	4	1	7	29	39	−10	13	
8	Era S Comexim Caransebeș	12	2	1	9	21	60	−39	7	
9	Agmonia Zăvoi	12	0	0	12	12	55	−43	0	

Updated to match(es) played on 8 March 2020. Source:
Rules for classification: 1) Points; 2) Head-to-head points; 3) Head-to-head goal difference; 4) Head-to-head goals scored; 5) Head-to-head away goals scored; 6) Goal difference; 7) Goals scored.
(Q) Qualified for the phase indicated

Championship play-off

The championship play-off was not played due to the COVID-19 pandemic. Progresul Ezeriș was designated the Liga IV Caraș-Severin County champion and qualified for the promotion play-off to Liga III.

=== Călărași County ===
Team changes from the previous season

- Mostiștea Ulmu achieved promotion to Liga III.
- CSM Oltenița was relegated from Liga III.
- Viitorul Dragoș Vodă (16th place), Zarea Cuza Vodă (17th place) and Viitorul Plătărești (18th place; withdrew) were relegated to Liga V Călărași.
- Vulturii Gălbinași (Series A winners) and Petrolul Ileana (Series B runners-up) were promoted from Liga V Călărași.
- Atletico Unirea (Series B winners) and Rapid Răzvani (Series A runners-up) declined promotion from Liga V Călărași.
- Conpet Ștefan Cel Mare was admitted to take the place of Atletico Unirea, having finished 3rd in Series B of Liga V Călărași.
- Victoria Lehliu (15th place) was spared from relegation.

Pos	Team	Pld	W	D	L	GF	GA	GD	Pts	Qualification or relegation
1	Venus Independența (C)	20	18	2	0	86	10	+76	56	Champion
2	Unirea Mânăstirea	20	14	2	4	72	23	+49	44	Ineligible for promotion
3	Oltenița (Q)	20	13	2	5	74	23	+51	41	Qualification to promotion play-off (Note: Oltenița qualified for the promotion play-off, as Venus Independența, the county champion, was ineligible for promotion, and Unirea Mânăstirea withdrew from the play-off.)
4	Partizan Crivăț	20	12	4	4	59	34	+25	40	
5	Roseți	20	11	2	7	70	40	+30	35	
6	Viitorul Curcani	20	11	2	7	54	39	+15	35	
7	Spicul Vâlcelele	20	11	2	7	44	36	+8	35	
8	Dunărea Ciocănești	20	11	1	8	53	27	+26	34	
9	Dunărea Grădiștea	20	10	2	8	54	43	+11	32	
10	Victoria Chirnogi	20	10	1	9	52	42	+10	31	
11	Victoria Lehliu	20	8	3	9	43	52	−9	27	
12	Progresul Fundulea	20	9	0	11	29	43	−14	27	
13	Steaua Radovanu	20	6	4	10	45	63	−18	22	
14	Tricolorul Jegălia	20	5	4	11	32	55	−23	19	
15	Unirea Dragalina	20	5	2	13	37	61	−24	17	
16	Petrolul Ileana	20	4	1	15	38	83	−45	13	
17	Vulturii Gălbinași	20	3	0	17	28	124	−96	9	
18	Conpet Ștefan Cel Mare	20	2	0	18	23	95	−72	6	

Updated to match(es) played on 8 March 2020. Source:
Rules for classification: 1) Points; 2) Head-to-head points; 3) Head-to-head goal difference; 4) Head-to-head goals scored; 5) Head-to-head away goals scored; 6) Goal difference; 7) Goals scored.
(C) Champions; (Q) Qualified for the phase indicated

=== Cluj County ===
Team changes from the previous season

- Viitorul Soporu de Câmpie (14th place) and Armenopolis Gherla (15th place) were relegated to Liga V Cluj.
- Viitorul Gârbău (Cluj Zone winners) was promoted from Liga V Cluj.
- Minerul 2016 Iara (Câmpia Turzii Zone Cluj winners), Someșul Cășeiu (Dej Zone winners), Progresul Nireș (Gherla Zone winners) and Gloria Cătina (Mociu Zone winners) declined promotion from Liga V Cluj.
- Unirea Dej II withdrew.
- Victoria Viișoara was admitted upon request.
- Supporter 2.0 Cluj-Napoca changed its name to Victoria Cluj before the championship play-off.

Pos	Team	Pld	W	D	L	GF	GA	GD	Pts	Qualification or relegation
1	Someșul Dej (Q)	15	13	1	1	46	7	+39	40	Qualification to championship play-off
2	Florești (Q)	15	12	2	1	66	12	+54	38	Qualification to championship play-off
3	Supporter 2.0 Cluj-Napoca (Q)	15	12	1	2	53	10	+43	37	Qualification to championship play-off
4	Vulturul Mintiu Gherlii	15	9	4	2	39	16	+23	31	
5	Unirea Iclod	15	10	0	5	34	17	+17	30	
6	Sporting Apahida	15	10	0	5	37	25	+12	30	
7	Arieșul Mihai Viteazu	15	9	0	6	35	20	+15	27	
8	Atletic Olimpia Gherla	15	6	1	8	22	22	0	19	
9	Victoria Viișoara	15	5	2	8	20	31	−11	17	
10	Câmpia Turzii	15	4	2	9	18	27	−9	14	
11	Someșul Gilău	15	3	0	12	23	47	−24	9	
12	Unirea Tritenii de Jos	15	2	1	12	14	75	−61	7	
13	Viitorul Gârbău	15	2	0	13	16	75	−59	6	Spared from relegation
14	CFR Dej	15	1	0	14	10	49	−39	3	Spared from relegation

Updated to match(es) played on 8 March 2020. Source:
Rules for classification: 1) Points; 2) Head-to-head points; 3) Head-to-head goal difference; 4) Head-to-head goals scored; 5) Head-to-head away goals scored; 6) Goal difference; 7) Goals scored.
(Q) Qualified for the phase indicated

Championship play-off

A championship play-off tournament between the top three teams (after 15 rounds) was held to decide the county champion and the team that would qualify for the promotion play-off to Liga III. The teams started with half of the points they had accumulated before the interruption.

Pos	Team	Pld	W	D	L	GF	GA	GD	Pts	Qualification
1	Someșul Dej (C, Q)	17	14	1	2	50	11	+39	23	Qualification to promotion play-off
2	Victoria Cluj	17	13	1	3	57	14	+43	22	
3	Florești	15	12	2	1	66	12	+54	19 (Note: Florești withdrew before the start of the play-off.)	

Source: AJF Cluj,(in Romanian)
Rules for classification: 1) Points; 2) Points without rounding; 3) Head-to-head points; 4) Head-to-head goal difference; 5) Head-to-head goals scored; 6) Goal difference; 7) Goals scored;
(C) Champions; (Q) Qualified for the phase indicated
Notes:

Results

21 July 2020	Someșul Dej	2–3	Victoria Cluj	Vad
18:00 EEST (UTC+3)	Colța 88'; S. Rus 89'	Report	V. Pop 5'; Hîmpea 43'; Petruș 55'	Stadium: Comunal; Attendance: 0 Referee: Marius Chiorean (Cluj-Napoca)

26 July 2020	Victoria Cluj	1–2	Someșul Dej	Cluj-Napoca
18:00 EEST (UTC+3)	Nistor 5'	Report	Colța 65'; D. Popa 90'	Stadium: Victoria Someșeni; Attendance: 0 Referee: Marius Chiorean (Cluj-Napoca)

=== Constanța County ===
Team changes from the previous season

- Poseidon Limanu-2 Mai achieved promotion to Liga III.
- Viitorul Pecineaga (runners-up) was promoted from Liga V Constanța.
- CS Peștera (winners) declined promotion from Liga V Constanța.
- FC Farul Constanța withdrew.
- Emaus Cernavodă was admitted upon request.
- Voința Valu lui Traian (18th place) was spared from relegation.

Pos	Team	Pld	W	D	L	GF	GA	GD	Pts	Qualification or relegation
1	Viitorul Fântânele	20	14	3	3	77	31	+46	45	Ineligible for promotion
2	Năvodari	20	14	3	3	65	23	+42	45	Ineligible for promotion
3	Gloria Albești (C, Q)	20	13	4	3	70	21	+49	43	Qualification to promotion play-off (Note: AJF Constanța intended to end the season with a play-off between the top four teams, but Viitorul Fântânele, CS Năvodari, and CS Agigea announced that they could not comply with the conditions imposed by the medical protocol. Following these decisions, the emergency committee of AJF Constanța declared Gloria Albești as the county champion and the representative of Constanța County at the promotion play-off to Liga III.)
4	Agigea	20	13	4	3	52	28	+24	43	
5	Cumpăna	20	11	5	4	45	29	+16	38	
6	Sparta Techirghiol	20	11	3	6	59	40	+19	36	
7	Lipnița-Carvăn	20	9	4	7	58	34	+24	31	
8	Portul Constanța	20	9	3	8	30	34	−4	30	
9	Farul Tuzla	20	8	5	7	38	34	+4	29	
10	Gloria Băneasa	20	8	3	9	52	46	+6	27	
11	Mihail Kogălniceanu	20	8	2	10	56	44	+12	26	
12	Ovidiu	20	7	5	8	46	35	+11	26	
13	Eforie	20	7	2	11	40	40	0	23	
14	Axiopolis Cernavodă II	20	7	1	12	32	42	−10	22	
15	Viitorul Pecineaga	20	6	0	14	45	79	−34	18	
16	Voința Valu lui Traian	20	5	2	13	28	91	−63	17	
17	Știința ACALAB Poarta Albă	20	4	3	13	27	45	−18	15	
18	Emaus Cernavodă	20	0	0	20	13	137	−124	0	

Updated to match(es) played on 7 March 2020. Source:
Rules for classification: 1) Points; 2) Head-to-head points; 3) Head-to-head goal difference; 4) Head-to-head goals scored; 5) Head-to-head away goals scored; 6) Goal difference; 7) Goals scored.
(C) Champions; (Q) Qualified for the phase indicated

=== Covasna County ===
Team changes from the previous season

- Stăruința Zagon achieved promotion to Liga III
- FC Ojdula (14th place) was relegated to Liga V Covasna.
- ACS Arcuș (winners) was promoted from Liga V Covasna.
- Spartacus Hăghig (runners-up) declined promotion from Liga V Covasna.
- Sepsi OSK Sfântu Gheorghe II was admitted upon request.

Pos	Team	Pld	W	D	L	GF	GA	GD	Pts	Qualification or relegation
1	Sepsi OSK Sfântu Gheorghe II (C, Q)	16	15	1	0	93	8	+85	46	Qualification to promotion play-off
2	Păpăuți	16	14	1	1	54	17	+37	43	
3	Prima Brăduț	16	13	0	3	52	18	+34	39	
4	Baraolt	16	12	2	2	44	14	+30	38	
5	Covasna	16	10	0	6	34	33	+1	30	
6	Nemere Ghelința	16	7	0	9	38	37	+1	21	
7	Cernat	16	5	3	8	29	32	−3	18	
8	Reci	16	5	2	9	33	44	−11	17	
9	Progresul Sita Buzăului	16	4	4	8	31	49	−18	16	
10	Perkö Sânzieni	16	4	3	9	30	38	−8	15	
11	Brețcu	16	3	3	10	21	71	−50	12	
12	Avântul Ilieni	16	3	2	11	23	43	−20	11	
13	Harghita Aita Mare	16	2	3	11	11	53	−42	9	
14	Arcuș	16	2	2	12	21	57	−36	8	

Updated to match(es) played on 1 December 2019. Source:
Rules for classification: 1) Points; 2) Head-to-head points; 3) Head-to-head goal difference; 4) Head-to-head goals scored; 5) Head-to-head away goals scored; 6) Goal difference; 7) Goals scored.
(C) Champions; (Q) Qualified for the phase indicated

=== Dâmbovița County ===
Team changes from the previous season

- Cetatea Târgoviște 1396 (North Series winners), Gaz Metan Finta (South Series winners) and Urban Titu (West Series winners) were promoted from Liga V Dâmbovița.
- Viitorul I.L. Caragiale (16th place), Petrolul Târgoviște (17th place; withdrew) and ACS Coada Izvorului (18th place; withdrew) were relegated to Liga V Dâmbovița.
- Unirea Răcari was replaced by Steagu Roșu Colacu.
- Voința Perșinari was replaced by Viitorul Răzvad.
- Cetatea Târgoviște 1396 was renamed Străjerii Târgoviște 1396 during the winter break.

Pos	Team	Pld	W	D	L	GF	GA	GD	Pts	Qualification or relegation
1	Roberto Ziduri (C, Q)	18	17	0	1	81	8	+73	51	Qualification to promotion play-off
2	Gloria Cornești	18	16	2	0	100	9	+91	50	
3	Recolta Gura Șuții	18	15	2	1	66	8	+58	47	
4	Străjerii Târgoviște 1396	18	11	2	5	58	28	+30	35	
5	Urban Titu	18	11	2	5	63	38	+25	35	
6	Fieni	18	9	4	5	54	36	+18	31	
7	Unirea Bucșani	18	10	1	7	43	40	+3	31	
8	Unirea Ungureni	18	8	3	7	46	41	+5	24 (Note: Unirea Ungureni and Olimpicii Ulmi deducted 3 points.)	
9	Brezoaele	18	6	1	11	60	68	−8	19	
10	Luceafărul Dragomirești	18	6	1	11	38	71	−33	19	
11	Olimpicii Ulmi	18	5	6	7	44	59	−15	18	
12	Steagu Roșu Colacu	18	5	3	10	30	64	−34	18	
13	Viitorul Răzvad	18	5	1	12	17	54	−37	16	
14	Progresul Mătăsaru	18	4	3	11	33	70	−37	15	
15	Unirea Colibași	18	4	2	12	42	64	−22	14	
16	Voința Vișina	18	3	5	10	25	56	−31	14	
17	Sportul Voinești	18	3	4	11	25	45	−20	13	
18	Gaz Metan Finta	18	2	2	14	21	87	−66	−1 (Note: Gaz Metan Finta deducted 9 points.)	

Updated to match(es) played on 8 March 2020. Source:
Rules for classification: 1) Points; 2) Head-to-head points; 3) Head-to-head goal difference; 4) Head-to-head goals scored; 5) Head-to-head away goals scored; 6) Goal difference; 7) Goals scored.
(C) Champions; (Q) Qualified for the phase indicated

=== Dolj County ===
Team changes from the previous season

- Tractorul Cetate achieved promotion to Liga III.
- Unirea Vela (14th place) was relegated to Liga V Dolj.
- Progresul Cerăt (Series I runners-up) (Note: Viitorul Giurgița, the Series I winners, was not eligible for promotion.) was promoted from Liga V Dolj.
- Progresul Castranova (Series II winners) and CS Sopot (Series III winners) declined promotion from Liga V Dolj.
- Flacăra Moțăței (13th place) was spared from relegation.
- Tractorul Cetate II, Tineretul Poiana Mare and Viitorul Măceșu de Sus were admitted upon request.
- Vânătorul Desa was renamed ACS Desa.

Pos	Team	Pld	W	D	L	GF	GA	GD	Pts	Qualification or relegation
1	Unirea Tricolor Dăbuleni (C, Q)	17	14	0	3	80	33	+47	42	Qualification to promotion play-off
2	Jiul Podari	17	13	2	2	66	25	+41	41	
3	Cârcea	17	13	1	3	70	21	+49	40	
4	Metropolitan Ișalnița	17	13	1	3	59	19	+40	40	
5	Știința Danubius Bechet	17	13	0	4	59	26	+33	39	
6	Unirea Amărăștii de Jos	17	11	2	4	41	23	+18	35	
7	Progresul Cerăt	17	10	1	6	56	39	+17	31	
8	Victoria Plenița	17	8	2	7	34	40	−6	26	
9	Desa	17	5	2	10	56	58	−2	17	
10	Tractorul Cetate II	17	5	2	10	44	55	−11	17	
11	Tineretul Poiana Mare	17	4	4	9	22	43	−21	16	
12	Progresul Segarcea	17	4	3	10	42	53	−11	15	
13	Viitorul Măceșu de Sus	17	4	3	10	33	47	−14	15	
14	Flacăra Moțăței	17	3	1	13	32	59	−27	10	
15	Recolta Ostroveni	17	2	4	11	30	60	−30	10	
16	Dunărea Calafat	17	0	0	17	5	128	−123	0	

Updated to match(es) played on 1 March 2020. Source:
Rules for classification: 1) Points; 2) Head-to-head points; 3) Head-to-head goal difference; 4) Head-to-head goals scored; 5) Head-to-head away goals scored; 6) Goal difference; 7) Goals scored.
(C) Champions; (Q) Qualified for the phase indicated

=== Galați County ===
Team changes from the previous season

- CSU Galați achieved promotion to Liga III.
- Avântul Valea Mărului (winners) was promoted from Liga V Galați.
- Mălina Smârdan (runners-up) declined promotion from Liga V Galați.
- Viitorul Costache Negri (13th place) and Juventus Toflea (14th place) were spared from relegation.

Pos	Team	Pld	W	D	L	GF	GA	GD	Pts	Qualification or relegation
1	Avântul Valea Mărului (C, Q)	14	13	1	0	65	12	+53	40	Qualification to promotion play-off
2	Zimbrul Slobozia Conachi	14	13	0	1	91	18	+73	39	
3	Gloria Ivești	14	8	3	3	48	19	+29	27	
4	Voința Cudalbi	14	8	2	4	36	24	+12	26	
5	Muncitorul Ghidigeni	14	8	0	6	65	21	+44	24	
6	Quantum Club Galați	14	7	3	4	41	23	+18	24	
7	Victoria Tecuci	14	8	0	6	43	35	+8	24	
8	Unirea Braniștea	14	7	2	5	39	23	+16	23	
9	Avântul Vânători	14	6	2	6	29	28	+1	20	
10	Agrostar Tulucești	14	5	1	8	32	33	−1	16	
11	Avântul Drăgănești	14	5	0	9	38	52	−14	15	
12	Viitorul Costache Negri	14	1	1	12	17	85	−68	4	
13	Juventus Toflea	14	1	0	13	12	107	−95	3	
14	Victoria Independența	14	0	1	13	13	89	−76	1	

Updated to match(es) played on 8 March 2020. Source:
Rules for classification: 1) Points; 2) Head-to-head points; 3) Head-to-head goal difference; 4) Head-to-head goals scored; 5) Head-to-head away goals scored; 6) Goal difference; 7) Goals scored.
(C) Champions; (Q) Qualified for the phase indicated

=== Giurgiu County ===
Team changes from the previous season

- Voința Daia (South Series winners) and Real Drăgăneasca (North Series winners) were promoted from Liga V Giurgiu.
- Unirea Joița (North Series 16th place; withdrew) was relegated to Liga V Giurgiu.
- Fortuna Herăști (South Series runners-up) and ACS Mihai Vodă (North Series runners-up) declined promotion from Liga V Giurgiu.
- CS Mihai Bravu withdrew.
- AS Podu Doamnei was spared from relegation.
- AS Prundu and Progresul Valea Dragului were admitted upon request.

South Series

Pos	Team	Pld	W	D	L	GF	GA	GD	Pts	Qualification or relegation
1	Victoria Adunații-Copăceni (Q)	18	15	1	2	107	22	+85	46	Qualification to championship final
2	Energia Remuș	18	14	3	1	50	12	+38	45	
3	Dunărea Giurgiu	18	13	3	2	57	21	+36	42	
4	Spicul Izvoru	18	13	1	4	83	23	+60	40	
5	Giganții Vărăști	18	11	3	4	71	32	+39	36	
6	Argeșul Hotarele	18	11	2	5	57	38	+19	35	
7	Voința Daia	18	9	2	7	46	39	+7	29	
8	Voința Slobozia	18	6	4	8	29	47	−18	22	
9	Dunărea Oinacu	18	6	1	11	28	30	−2	19	
10	Viitorul Vedea	18	5	4	9	36	49	−13	19	
11	Prundu	18	6	1	11	28	60	−32	19	
12	Real Colibași	18	5	2	11	28	54	−26	17	
13	Gloria Comana	18	5	1	12	23	74	−51	16	
14	Unirea Izvoarele	18	4	2	12	27	67	−40	14	
15	Progresul Valea Dragului	18	5	0	13	33	61	−28	12 (Note: Progresul Valea Dragului deducted 3 points.)	
16	Mihai Viteazul Călugăreni	18	1	0	17	10	84	−74	1 (Note: Mihai Viteazul Călugăreni deducted 2 points.)	

Updated to match(es) played on 7 March 2020. Source:
Rules for classification: 1) Points; 2) Head-to-head points; 3) Head-to-head goal difference; 4) Head-to-head goals scored; 5) Head-to-head away goals scored; 6) Goal difference; 7) Goals scored.
(Q) Qualified for the phase indicated
Notes:

North Series

Pos	Team	Pld	W	D	L	GF	GA	GD	Pts	Qualification or relegation
1	Argeșul Mihăilești (Q)	18	17	1	0	88	21	+67	52	Qualification to championship final
2	Singureni	18	14	2	2	86	24	+62	44	
3	Bolintin Malu Spart	18	14	1	3	79	24	+55	43	
4	Viitorul Tântava	18	13	1	4	46	22	+24	40	
5	Avântul Florești	18	10	1	7	53	37	+16	31	
6	Petrolul Roata de Jos	18	8	5	5	40	38	+2	29	
7	Bolintin-Deal	18	8	3	7	39	40	−1	27	
8	Maxima Hobaia	18	7	3	8	53	52	+1	24	
9	Rapid Clejani	18	6	3	9	37	42	−5	21	
10	Luceafărul Trestieni	18	6	3	9	40	49	−9	21	
11	Real Drăgăneasca	18	6	2	10	30	63	−33	20	
12	Zmeii Ogrezeni	18	5	3	10	29	52	−23	18	
13	Iepurești	18	3	3	12	33	57	−24	12	
14	Podu Doamnei	18	4	2	12	25	60	−35	12 (Note: Podu Doamnei deducted 2 points.)	
15	Silver Inter Zorile	18	3	1	14	32	59	−27	10	
16	Unirea Cosoba	18	2	2	14	22	92	−70	8	

Updated to match(es) played on 7 March 2020. Source:
Rules for classification: 1) Points; 2) Head-to-head points; 3) Head-to-head goal difference; 4) Head-to-head goals scored; 5) Head-to-head away goals scored; 6) Goal difference; 7) Goals scored.
(Q) Qualified for the phase indicated
Notes:

Championship final

25 July 2020	Argeșul Mihăilești	5–3 (a.e.t.)	Victoria Adunații-Copăceni	Izvoarele
10:30 EEST (UTC+3)	D. Fagu 19'; V. Bucă 65'; V. Bucă 93'; C. Păun 103'; V. Bucă 118'	Report	A. Torețoiu 43'; D. Rădăcină 73'; S. Nicolescu 110'	Stadium: Ion Mangeac; Attendance: 0 Referee: Iulian Marian Țene (Giurgiu)

Argeșul Mihăilești won the Liga IV Giurgiu County and qualified for the promotion play-off in Liga III.

=== Gorj County ===
Team changes from the previous season

- Gilortul Târgu Cărbunești achieved promotion to Liga III.
- Triumful Borăscu (winners) and Viitorul Plopșoru (runners-up) declined promotion from Liga V Gorj.
- Unirea Crușeț and Știința Hurezani withdrew.
- Știința Flacăra Roșia de Amaradia (15th place) and Petrolul Stoina (16th place) were spared from relegation.
- Dinamo Inter Stănești was admitted upon request.

Pos	Team	Pld	W	D	L	GF	GA	GD	Pts	Qualification or relegation
1	Știința Turceni (C, Q)	14	12	1	1	43	7	+36	37	Qualification to promotion play-off
2	Petrolul Bustuchin	14	10	2	2	66	12	+54	32	
3	Vulturii Fărcașești	14	9	4	1	46	12	+34	31	
4	Petrolul Țicleni	14	8	2	4	36	17	+19	26	
5	Avântul Baia de Fier	14	7	3	4	43	35	+8	24	
6	Jiul Rovinari	14	5	8	1	33	15	+18	23	
7	Novaci	14	7	2	5	28	22	+6	23	
8	Internațional Bălești	14	6	4	4	42	23	+19	22	
9	Parângul Bumbești-Jiu	14	3	3	8	26	45	−19	12	
10	Dinamo Inter Stănești	14	3	3	8	23	56	−33	12	
11	Viitorul Negomir	14	2	4	8	16	42	−26	10	
12	Minerul II Mătăsari	14	3	1	10	10	38	−28	10	
13	Știința Flacăra Roșia de Amaradia	14	1	3	10	19	65	−46	6	
14	Petrolul Stoina	14	1	2	11	16	58	−42	5	

Updated to match(es) played on 8 March 2020. Source:
Rules for classification: 1) Points; 2) Head-to-head points; 3) Head-to-head goal difference; 4) Head-to-head goals scored; 5) Head-to-head away goals scored; 6) Goal difference; 7) Goals scored.
(C) Champions; (Q) Qualified for the phase indicated

=== Harghita County ===
Team changes from the previous season

- Târnava Mare Betești (West Series 13th place) and Tartód Vârșag (West Series 14th place) were relegated to Liga V Harghita.
- AS Forțeni (Odorhei Zone winners), Reménység Mărtiniș (Odorhei Zone runners-up), MÜ Frumoasa (Ciuc Zone winners) and Ghimeș-Făget Lunca de Jos (Ciuc Zone runners-up) were promoted from Liga V Harghita.

West Series

Pos	Team	Pld	W	D	L	GF	GA	GD	Pts	Qualification or relegation
1	Sporting Odorheiu Secuiesc (C)	15	12	1	2	60	20	+40	37	Qualification to championship final
2	Farkaslaka Lupeni	15	9	3	3	29	19	+10	30	
3	Roseal Odorheiu Secuiesc	14	9	1	4	24	15	+9	28	
4	Forțeni	15	7	3	5	38	23	+15	24	
5	Unirea Lueta	15	6	4	5	28	23	+5	22	
6	Bradul Zetea	14	6	3	5	47	36	+11	21	
7	Agyagfalvi Lendület Lutița	15	6	3	6	33	30	+3	21	
8	Galambfalva Porumbenii Mari	15	6	2	7	28	26	+2	20	
9	Unirea Cristuru Secuiesc	14	5	4	5	22	25	−3	19	
10	Homorod Merești	14	6	1	7	27	35	−8	19	
11	Tineretul Morăreni	15	6	0	9	37	43	−6	18	
12	Metalul Vlăhița	13	4	1	8	21	43	−22	13	
13	Andycom Avrămești	13	3	2	8	21	44	−23	11	
14	Reménység Mărtiniș	15	1	2	12	21	54	−33	5	

Updated to match(es) played on 8 March 2020. Source:
Rules for classification: 1) Points; 2) Head-to-head points; 3) Head-to-head goal difference; 4) Head-to-head goals scored; 5) Head-to-head away goals scored; 6) Goal difference; 7) Goals scored.
(C) Champions

East Series

Pos	Team	Pld	W	D	L	GF	GA	GD	Pts	Qualification or relegation
1	Gheorgheni (C)	13	11	1	1	50	23	+27	34	Qualification to championship final
2	Ezüstfenyő Ciceu	13	10	0	3	38	19	+19	30	
3	Pro Mureșul Toplița	13	8	1	4	51	25	+26	25	
4	Sânsimion	13	7	2	4	34	33	+1	23	
5	Sândominic	13	7	1	5	44	34	+10	22	
6	Minerul Bălan	13	7	0	6	29	25	+4	21	
7	Bastya Lăzarea	13	5	1	7	30	31	−1	16	
8	Fișag Ciucsângeorgiu	13	5	1	7	19	27	−8	16	
9	MÜ Frumoasa	13	1	1	11	20	47	−27	4	
10	Ghimeș-Făget Lunca de Jos	13	0	0	13	19	70	−51	0	

Updated to match(es) played on 8 March 2020. Source:
Rules for classification: 1) Points; 2) Head-to-head points; 3) Head-to-head goal difference; 4) Head-to-head goals scored; 5) Head-to-head away goals scored; 6) Goal difference; 7) Goals scored.
(C) Champions

Championship final

The teams ranked first in the two series, Sporting Odorheiu Secuiesc and Gheorgheni, were declared county champions. Gheorgheni qualified for promotion play-off because the team from Odorheiu Secuiesc does not have C.I.S. (Sports Identity Certificate) issued by the Ministry of Youth and Sports required to play in Liga III.

=== Hunedoara County ===
Team changes from previous season

- Măgura Pui (winners) and Metalul Crișcior (runners-up) declined promotion from Liga V Hunedoara.
- Universitatea Petroșani withdrew.

Pos	Team	Pld	W	D	L	GF	GA	GD	Pts	Qualification or relegation (Note: Teams would have been split into two groups (championship play-off and championship play-out) after each had played 20 matches.)
1	Jiul Petroșani (C, Q)	17	14	0	3	71	12	+59	42	Qualification to promotion play-off
2	Gloria Geoagiu	17	12	4	1	63	22	+41	40	
3	Aurul Brad	16	11	2	3	51	20	+31	35	
4	Șoimul Băița	18	9	3	6	45	30	+15	30	
5	CSM Vulcan	17	8	5	4	49	19	+30	29	
6	Inter Petrila	16	9	2	5	34	15	+19	29	
7	Retezatul Hațeg	17	8	3	6	48	31	+17	27	
8	Cetate Deva II	17	4	2	11	17	74	−57	14	
9	Minerul Uricani	17	4	1	12	25	72	−47	13	
10	Dacia Orăștie	18	3	2	13	29	58	−29	11	
11	Victoria Călan	18	0	0	18	3	82	−79	0	

Updated to match(es) played on 8 March 2020. Source:
Rules for classification: 1) Points; 2) Head-to-head points; 3) Head-to-head goal difference; 4) Head-to-head goals scored; 5) Head-to-head away goals scored; 6) Goal difference; 7) Goals scored.
(C) Champions; (Q) Qualified for the phase indicated

=== Ialomița County ===
Team changes from the previous season

- Recolta Gheorghe Doja achieved promotion to Liga III.
- Voința Maia (16th place) was relegated to Liga V Ialomița.
- FC Orezu (Series I runners-up) (Note: Abatorul Slobozia II, the Series I winners, was not eligible for promotion.) and Înfrățirea Jilavele (Series II winners) were promoted from Liga V Ialomița.
- Spartacus Iazu was renamed AFC Iazu.
- Secunda Adâncata ceded its place to Avântul Rovine.

Pos	Team	Pld	W	D	L	GF	GA	GD	Pts	Qualification or relegation
1	Bărăganul Ciulnița (Q)	16	11	5	0	57	16	+41	38	Qualification to championship final
2	Victoria Țăndărei (Q)	16	12	2	2	45	18	+27	38	Qualification to championship final
3	Înfrățirea Jilavele	16	12	0	4	49	19	+30	36	
4	Amara	16	10	3	3	40	17	+23	33	
5	Victoria Munteni-Buzău	16	10	1	5	40	26	+14	31	
6	Viitorul Axintele	15	9	2	4	47	24	+23	29	
7	Urziceni	16	7	2	7	28	20	+8	23	
8	Abatorul Slobozia	16	7	2	7	36	36	0	23	
9	Avântul Rovine	16	6	3	7	32	31	+1	21	
10	Fetești	16	6	0	10	43	40	+3	18	
11	Iazu	15	5	0	10	30	56	−26	15	
12	Unirea Ion Roată	16	3	3	10	19	39	−20	12	
13	Recolta Bărcănești	16	3	1	12	21	74	−53	10	
14	Orezu	16	2	3	11	17	51	−34	9	Spared from relegation
15	Recolta Gheorghe Lazăr	16	2	1	13	25	62	−37	7	Spared from relegation
16	Unirea Grivița (Note: Unirea Grivița excluded in the first part of the season and all its results were canceled.) (D)	0	0	0	0	0	0	0	0	Expelled

Updated to match(es) played on 7 March 2020. Source:
Rules for classification: 1) Points; 2) Head-to-head points; 3) Head-to-head goal difference; 4) Head-to-head goals scored; 5) Head-to-head away goals scored; 6) Goal difference; 7) Goals scored.
(D) Disqualified; (Q) Qualified for the phase indicated
Notes:

Championship final

26 July 2020	Bărăganul Ciulnița	5–1	Victoria Țăndărei	Slobozia
17:00 EEST (UTC+3)	Cătălin Scurtu 20'; Cătălin Scurtu 21'; Cătălin Scurtu 76'; Dumitru Gheorghe 80'; Ștefan Matache 86'		Răzvan Anghelescu 22'	Stadium: 1 Mai

Bărăganul Ciulnița won the Liga IV Ialomița County and qualified for the promotion play-off in Liga III.

=== Iași County ===
Team changes from the previous season

- Gloria Românești (14th place), Poly 2014 Iași (15th place) and Știința Miroslava II (16th place; withdrew) were relegated to Liga V Iași.
- AS Țuțora (Series I runners-up and play-off winners (Note: Avântul Golăiești, the Series I winners, was not eligible for promotion. AS Țuțora, Series I runners-up, defeated AS Holboca 3–0, Series II runners-up, in the promotion play-off.)), Viitorul Târgu Frumos (Series II winners) and Biruința Miroslovești (Series III winners) were promoted from Liga V Iași.

Pos	Team	Pld	W	D	L	GF	GA	GD	Pts	Qualification or relegation
1	Unirea Mircești (C, Q)	17	16	1	0	88	8	+80	49	Qualification to promotion play-off
2	Victoria Lețcani	17	14	2	1	50	16	+34	44	
3	Moldova Cristești	17	11	1	5	47	21	+26	34	
4	Flacăra Erbiceni	17	10	4	3	43	23	+20	34	
5	Stejarul Bârnova	17	11	1	5	47	38	+9	34	
6	Unirea Ruginoasa	17	10	2	5	47	29	+18	32	
7	Viitorul Târgu Frumos	17	8	4	5	46	24	+22	28	
8	Biruința Miroslovești	17	6	5	6	32	34	−2	23	
9	Gloria Bălțați	17	6	3	8	37	44	−7	21	
10	Țuțora	17	7	0	10	24	46	−22	21	
11	Viitorul Hârlau	17	6	2	9	33	37	−4	20	
12	Stejarul Sinești	17	4	3	10	37	44	−7	15	
13	Unirea Scânteia	17	3	2	12	26	53	−27	11	
14	Ciurea	17	3	1	13	34	54	−20	10	
15	Progresul Deleni	17	3	1	13	21	63	−42	10	
16	Tomești	17	2	0	15	20	98	−78	6	

Updated to match(es) played on 8 December 2019. Source:
Rules for classification: 1) Points; 2) Head-to-head points; 3) Head-to-head goal difference; 4) Head-to-head goals scored; 5) Head-to-head away goals scored; 6) Goal difference; 7) Goals scored.
(C) Champions; (Q) Qualified for the phase indicated

=== Ilfov County ===
Team changes from the previous season

- Viitorul Domnești was relegated from Liga III.
- Viitorul Petrăchioaia (11th place) and Gloria Islaz (12th place) were relegated to Liga V Ilfov.
- CS Glina (winners), ACS Corbeanca (runners-up) and Voința Buftea (3rd place) were promoted from Liga V Ilfov.
- Athletico Floreasca and Unirea Dobroești withdrew.
- Vulturii Pasărea ceded its place to CS Brănești.

Pos	Team	Pld	W	D	L	GF	GA	GD	Pts	Qualification or relegation
1	Viitorul Domnești (C, Q)	11	11	0	0	49	6	+43	33	Qualification to promotion play-off
2	Corbeanca	11	9	1	1	31	19	+12	28	
3	Glina	11	8	0	3	36	23	+13	24	
4	Măgurele	11	5	1	5	27	20	+7	16	
5	Viitorul Pantelimon	11	4	3	4	33	29	+4	15	
6	Voluntari III	11	5	0	6	39	37	+2	15	
7	Brănești	11	5	0	6	36	34	+2	15	
8	Periș	11	5	0	6	25	32	−7	15	
9	Berceni	11	4	2	5	19	24	−5	14	
10	Ciorogârla	11	3	1	7	22	32	−10	10	
11	Viitorul Dragomirești-Vale	11	1	2	8	19	42	−23	5	
12	Voința Buftea	11	1	0	10	17	55	−38	3	

Updated to match(es) played on 17 November 2019. Source:
Rules for classification: 1) Points; 2) Head-to-head points; 3) Head-to-head goal difference; 4) Head-to-head goals scored; 5) Head-to-head away goals scored; 6) Goal difference; 7) Goals scored.
(C) Champions; (Q) Qualified for the phase indicated

=== Maramureș County ===
Teams changes from the previous season

- Faurul Făurești (Series I winners) and Gloria Sălsig (Series II winners) declined promotion from Liga V Maramureș.
- Comuna Satulung withdrew during the previous season.
- Luceafărul Strâmtura withdrew before the start of the previous season.
- Plimob Sighetu Marmației was excluded.
- Rapid Satu Nou de Sus, Minerul Baia Sprie and Carmen Satulung were admitted upon request.

South Series

Pos	Team	Pld	W	D	L	GF	GA	GD	Pts	Qualification or relegation
1	Progresul Șomcuta Mare (Q)	14	13	1	0	73	11	+62	40	Qualification to championship final
2	Lăpușul Târgu Lăpuș	14	11	0	3	42	21	+21	33	
3	Progresul Dumbrăvița	13	9	2	2	39	19	+20	29	
4	Seini	14	9	0	5	29	19	+10	27	
5	Minerul Baia Sprie	14	8	3	3	36	28	+8	27	
6	Unirea Șișești	14	5	4	5	40	33	+7	19	
7	Viitorul Ulmeni	14	6	1	7	39	34	+5	19	
8	Rapid Satu Nou de Sus	13	6	1	6	34	39	−5	19	
9	Fărcașa	14	5	1	8	26	25	+1	16	
10	Suciu de Sus	13	4	0	9	22	39	−17	12	
11	Nistru	14	2	2	10	22	57	−35	8	
12	Bradul Groșii Țibleșului	13	2	1	10	16	42	−26	7	
13	Carmen Satulung	14	0	2	12	16	67	−51	2	

Updated to match(es) played on 15 November 2019. Source:
Rules for classification: 1) Points; 2) Head-to-head points; 3) Head-to-head goal difference; 4) Head-to-head goals scored; 5) Head-to-head away goals scored; 6) Goal difference; 7) Goals scored.
(Q) Qualified for the phase indicated

North Series

Pos	Team	Pld	W	D	L	GF	GA	GD	Pts	Qualification or relegation
1	Sighetu Marmației (Q)	12	10	2	0	76	10	+66	32	Qualification to championship final
2	Recolta Săliștea de Sus	11	8	3	0	28	12	+16	27	
3	Avântul Bârsana	12	8	0	4	51	16	+35	24	
4	Bradul Vișeu de Sus	12	7	2	3	35	20	+15	23	
5	Zorile Moisei	12	6	3	3	34	14	+20	21	
6	Salina Ocna Șugatag	12	5	2	5	29	27	+2	17	
7	Remeți	12	5	0	7	30	41	−11	15	
8	Iza Dragomirești	12	4	2	6	31	41	−10	14	
9	Borșa	12	2	0	10	20	52	−32	6	
10	Metalul Bogdan Vodă	11	2	0	9	15	49	−34	6	
11	Foresta Câmpulung la Tisa	10	0	0	10	8	75	−67	0	

Updated to match(es) played on 17 November 2019. Source:
Rules for classification: 1) Points; 2) Head-to-head points; 3) Head-to-head goal difference; 4) Head-to-head goals scored; 5) Head-to-head away goals scored; 6) Goal difference; 7) Goals scored.
(Q) Qualified for the phase indicated

Championship final

24 July 2020	Progresul Șomcuta Mare	1–1 (6–5 p)	Sighetu Marmației	Baia Mare
17:00 EEST (UTC+3)	Gherghel 51'	Report	Gubics 44'	Stadium: Viorel Mateianu; Attendance: 0 Referee: Szabolcs Kovács (Carei)

Progresul Șomcuta Mare won the Liga IV Maramureș County and qualified for the promotion play-off in Liga III.

=== Mehedinți County ===
Teams changes from the previous season

- Dunărea Pristol (12th place) was relegated to Liga V Mehedinți.
- Inter Crăguiești (winners) and Viitorul Florești (runners-up) declined promotion from Liga V Mehedinți.
- Decebal Eșelnița withdrew.
- AS Turnu Severin was spared from relegation.
- Unirea Gârla Mare, and Cerna Baia de Aramă were admitted upon request.

Pos	Team	Pld	W	D	L	GF	GA	GD	Pts	Qualification or relegation
1	Recolta Dănceu (C)	11	10	0	1	44	9	+35	30	Ineligible for promotion
2	Strehaia (Q)	11	9	0	2	50	6	+44	27	Qualification to promotion play-off (Note: Strehaia qualify for promotion play-off as Recolta Dănceu, the county champion, was ineligible for promotion.)
3	Inter Salcia	11	9	0	2	24	9	+15	27	
4	Obârșia de Câmp	11	7	1	3	18	15	+3	22	
5	Viitorul Șimian	11	7	0	4	24	15	+9	21	
6	Pandurii Cerneți	11	6	1	4	35	27	+8	19	
7	Turnu Severin	11	5	1	5	24	18	+6	16	
8	Victoria Vânju Mare	11	3	2	6	18	25	−7	11	
9	Dierna Orșova	11	2	0	9	11	23	−12	6	
10	Viitorul Cujmir	11	2	0	9	10	41	−31	6	
11	Unirea Gârla Mare	11	2	0	9	12	47	−35	6	
12	Cerna Baia de Aramă	11	1	1	9	7	42	−35	1 (Note: Cerna Baia de Aramă deducted 3 points.)	

Updated to match(es) played on 17 November 2019. Source:
Rules for classification: 1) Points; 2) Head-to-head points; 3) Head-to-head goal difference; 4) Head-to-head goals scored; 5) Head-to-head away goals scored; 6) Goal difference; 7) Goals scored.
(C) Champions; (Q) Qualified for the phase indicated

=== Mureș County ===
Team changes from the previous season

- CSM Târgu Mureș achieved promotion to Liga III.
- CS Iernut was relegated from Liga III.
- Gaz Metan Daneș (14th place) was relegated to Liga V Mureș.
- Viitorul Aluniș (winners) declined promotion from Liga V Mureș.
- Mureșul Chirileu, Inter Sânger and Târnava Mică Sângeorgiu de Pădure were enrolled upon request.

Pos	Team	Pld	W	D	L	GF	GA	GD	Pts	Qualification or relegation
1	Unirea Ungheni (C, Q)	15	13	0	2	84	10	+74	39	Qualification to promotion play-off
2	Mureșul Rușii-Munți	15	10	2	3	56	23	+33	32	
3	Târnava Mică Sângeorgiu de Pădure	14	10	2	2	42	15	+27	32	
4	Mureșul Luduș	15	10	1	4	62	24	+38	31	
5	Sighișoara	15	8	2	5	30	22	+8	26	
6	Sovata	15	8	2	5	34	32	+2	26	
7	Iernut	15	8	1	6	42	21	+21	25	
8	Rază de Soare Acățari	15	7	1	7	31	33	−2	22	
9	Mureșul Chirileu	15	6	1	8	34	44	−10	19	
10	Atletic Târgu Mureș	15	6	1	8	32	42	−10	19	
11	Inter Sânger	15	5	2	8	29	41	−12	17	
12	Sâncrai Nazna	15	4	3	8	21	55	−34	15	
13	Miercurea Nirajului	14	3	0	11	22	60	−38	9	
14	Sărmașu	15	2	2	11	16	69	−53	8	
15	Viitorul Ungheni	15	2	0	13	19	62	−43	6	
16	Mureșul Cuci (Note: Mureșul Cuci withdrew from the championship after the 1st round.) (D)	1	0	0	1	1	2	−1	0	Withdrew

Updated to match(es) played on 7 March 2020. Source:
Rules for classification: 1) Points; 2) Head-to-head points; 3) Head-to-head goal difference; 4) Head-to-head goals scored; 5) Head-to-head away goals scored; 6) Goal difference; 7) Goals scored.
(C) Champions; (D) Disqualified; (Q) Qualified for the phase indicated

=== Neamț County ===
Team changes from the previous season

- Ozana Târgu Neamț achieved promotion to Liga III.
- Bravo Bodești, Vulturul Costișa, Zorile Urecheni, Ozana Timișești, Voința Dochia, Stejarul Țibucani, Viitorul Podoleni, ASF Girov, Flacăra Brusturi, AS Grumăzești, Voința Valea Ursului, Voința Bozieni, WST Oniceni, Stejarul Stănița and Siretul Doljești were promoted from Liga V Neamț.
- Moldova Pildești, Unirea Trifești, Cetatea Gâdinți and Voința Ion Creangă were admitted upon request.

Series A

Pos	Team	Pld	W	D	L	GF	GA	GD	Pts	Qualification or relegation
1	Bradu Borca (Q)	12	12	0	0	78	9	+69	36	Qualification to championship final
2	Speranța Răucești	13	12	0	1	63	11	+52	36	
3	Bravo Bodești	13	10	1	2	42	21	+21	31	
4	Ozana Timișești	13	7	1	5	44	27	+17	22	
5	Energia Pângărați	13	5	3	5	26	35	−9	18	
6	Stejarul Țibucani	13	5	2	6	36	32	+4	17	
7	Zorile Urecheni	13	5	1	7	33	37	−4	16	
8	Flacăra Brusturi	13	3	2	8	24	52	−28	11	
9	Grumăzești	13	3	2	8	16	48	−32	11	
10	Viitorul Podoleni	12	3	1	8	22	42	−20	10	
11	Voința Dochia	13	3	0	10	20	55	−35	9	
12	Girov	13	2	1	10	17	52	−35	7	

Updated to match(es) played on 8 March 2020. Source:
Rules for classification: 1) Points; 2) Head-to-head points; 3) Head-to-head goal difference; 4) Head-to-head goals scored; 5) Head-to-head away goals scored; 6) Goal difference; 7) Goals scored.
(Q) Qualified for the phase indicated

Series B

Pos	Team	Pld	W	D	L	GF	GA	GD	Pts	Qualification or relegation
1	Victoria Horia (Q)	13	13	0	0	61	8	+53	39	Qualification to championship final
2	Moldova Cordun	13	11	1	1	79	13	+66	34	
3	Voința Valea Ursului	13	11	0	2	63	22	+41	33	
4	Voința Ion Creangă	13	8	1	4	37	27	+10	25	
5	Voința Bozieni	13	6	1	6	36	32	+4	19	
6	Vulturul Costișa	13	6	1	6	35	32	+3	19	
7	Unirea Trifești	13	5	1	7	21	40	−19	16	
8	Stejarul Stănița	13	5	0	8	26	41	−15	15	
9	WST Oniceni	13	3	2	8	23	38	−15	11	
10	Siretul Doljești	13	2	3	8	18	41	−23	9	
11	Cetatea Gâdinți	13	2	1	10	22	66	−44	7	
12	Moldova Pildești	13	0	1	12	19	80	−61	1	

Updated to match(es) played on 8 March 2020. Source:
Rules for classification: 1) Points; 2) Head-to-head points; 3) Head-to-head goal difference; 4) Head-to-head goals scored; 5) Head-to-head away goals scored; 6) Goal difference; 7) Goals scored.
(Q) Qualified for the phase indicated

Championship final

On 23 July 2020, Victoria Horia announced that it cannot comply with the conditions imposed by the medical protocol imposed by the FRF.

26 July 2020	Bradu Borca	w/o	Victoria Horia	Piatra Neamț
11:00 EEST (UTC+3)		Report		Stadium: Ceahlăul

Bradu Borca won the Liga IV Neamț County and qualified for the promotion play-off in Liga III.

=== Olt County ===
Team changes from the previous season

- CSM Slatina achieved promotion to Liga III.
- Academica Balș (15th place), Avântul Coteana (17th place) and Victoria Dobrun (18th place) were relegated to Liga V Olt.
- Valea Oltului Cilieni (Series IV winners) was promoted from Liga V Olt.
- Avântul Oporelu (Series I winners), Viitorul Leotești (Series II winners) and Șoimii Drăghiceni (Series III winners) declined promotion from Liga V Olt.
- Vedea Văleni Nicolae Titulescu withdrew during the previous season.
- Recolta Stoicănești was spared from relegation.
- Știința Cioflanu was admitted upon request.
- Vedița Colonești merged with Atletic Bradu and took Atletic Bradu’s place in Liga III.

Pos	Team	Pld	W	D	L	GF	GA	GD	Pts	Qualification or relegation
1	Petrolul Potcoava (C, Q)	16	15	1	0	46	13	+33	46	Qualification to promotion play-off
2	Oltul Curtișoara	16	14	0	2	65	12	+53	42	
3	Unirea Radomirești	16	9	1	6	38	28	+10	28	
4	Viitorul Osica de Jos	16	8	4	4	37	35	+2	28	
5	Voința Schitu	16	9	1	6	36	34	+2	28	
6	Viitorul Grădinile	16	8	2	6	31	25	+6	26	
7	Oltul Slătioara	16	8	1	7	38	23	+15	25	
8	Voința Băbiciu	15	7	4	4	35	21	+14	25	
9	Oltețul Osica	15	8	0	7	29	29	0	24	
10	Recolta Stoicănești	15	6	1	8	24	20	+4	19	
11	Viitorul Rusănești	16	4	2	10	44	50	−6	14	
12	Valea Oltului Cilieni	16	4	0	12	25	49	−24	12	
13	Știința Cioflanu	16	3	2	11	30	60	−30	11	
14	Viitorul Băleasa	15	2	2	11	17	48	−31	8	
15	Olt Scornicești	16	2	1	13	20	68	−48	7	

Updated to match(es) played on 8 March 2020. Source:
Rules for classification: 1) Points; 2) Head-to-head points; 3) Head-to-head goal difference; 4) Head-to-head goals scored; 5) Head-to-head away goals scored; 6) Goal difference; 7) Goals scored.
(C) Champions; (Q) Qualified for the phase indicated

=== Prahova County ===
Team changes from the previous season

- CS Blejoi achieved promotion to Liga III.
- CS Ceptura (16th place) was relegated to Liga V Prahova.
- Petrolul Băicoi (winners) and CS Brazi Negoiești (runners-up) were promoted from Liga V Prahova.

Pos	Team	Pld	W	D	L	GF	GA	GD	Pts	Qualification or relegation
1	Plopeni (C, Q)	16	13	3	0	58	15	+43	42	Qualification to promotion play-off
2	Tricolorul Breaza	16	13	0	3	40	22	+18	39	
3	Petrolistul Boldești	16	12	2	2	48	11	+37	38	
4	Bănești-Urleta	16	11	2	3	52	27	+25	35	
5	Petrolul 95 Ploiești	16	10	1	5	43	26	+17	31	
6	Teleajenul Vălenii de Munte	16	9	3	4	36	20	+16	30	
7	Cornu	16	7	5	4	38	27	+11	26	
8	Păulești	16	8	2	6	28	19	+9	26	
9	Brazi Negoiești	16	7	0	9	23	33	−10	21	
10	Unirea Urlați	16	6	1	9	32	39	−7	19	
11	Brebu	16	6	1	9	23	34	−11	19	
12	Avântul Măneciu	16	5	0	11	31	45	−14	15	
13	Petrolul Băicoi	16	4	2	10	27	55	−28	14	
14	Mănești 2013 Coada Izvorului	16	1	3	12	19	49	−30	6	
15	Strejnic	16	1	2	13	16	54	−38	5	
16	Tinerețea Izvoarele	16	0	3	13	9	47	−38	3	

Updated to match(es) played on 8 March 2020. Source:
Rules for classification: 1) Points; 2) Head-to-head points; 3) Head-to-head goal difference; 4) Head-to-head goals scored; 5) Head-to-head away goals scored; 6) Goal difference; 7) Goals scored.
(C) Champions; (Q) Qualified for the phase indicated

=== Satu Mare County ===
Team changes from the previous season

- Unirea Tășnad was relegated from Liga III.
- Egri Sasok Agriș (Series A 12th place) and Atletic Craidorolț (Series B 12th place) were relegated to Liga V Satu Mare.
- Olimpia MCMXXI Satu Mare (Series A winners) and Voința Turț (Series B winners) were promoted from Liga V Satu Mare.

Pos	Team	Pld	W	D	L	GF	GA	GD	Pts	Qualification or relegation
1	Talna Orașu Nou	12	11	0	1	63	15	+48	33	Qualification to championship play-off
2	Olimpia MCMXXI Satu Mare	12	10	1	1	72	16	+56	31	Qualification to championship play-off
3	Energia Negrești-Oaș	12	9	1	2	42	12	+30	28	
4	Turul Micula	12	8	2	2	45	28	+17	26	
5	Speranța Halmeu	12	6	1	5	26	36	−10	19	
6	Dacia Medieșu Aurit	11	6	0	5	23	22	+1	18	
7	Voința Turț	12	5	1	6	25	24	+1	16	
8	Victoria Apa	12	5	1	6	20	24	−4	16	
9	Voința Lazuri	12	2	2	8	14	40	−26	8	
10	Sportul Botiz	12	2	2	8	17	47	−30	8	
11	Livada	12	1	1	10	12	48	−36	4	
12	Venus Dumbrava	11	0	0	11	9	56	−47	0	

Updated to match(es) played on 8 March 2020. Source:
Rules for classification: 1) Points; 2) Head-to-head points; 3) Head-to-head goal difference; 4) Head-to-head goals scored; 5) Head-to-head away goals scored; 6) Goal difference; 7) Goals scored.

Series B (Someș Zone)

Pos	Team	Pld	W	D	L	GF	GA	GD	Pts	Qualification or relegation
1	Recolta Dorolț	11	11	0	0	67	7	+60	33	Qualification to championship play-off
2	Crasna Moftinu Mic	10	9	0	1	33	10	+23	27	Qualification to championship play-off
3	Unirea Păulești	11	9	0	2	35	19	+16	27	
4	Unirea Tășnad	11	6	2	3	40	14	+26	20	
5	Voința Doba	11	5	1	5	19	22	−3	16	
6	Someșul Oar	11	4	2	5	24	41	−17	14	
7	Luceafărul Decebal	11	3	3	5	19	22	−3	12	
8	Știința Beltiug	11	2	2	7	19	47	−28	8	
9	Cetate Ardud	11	2	2	7	13	41	−28	8	
10	Voința Babța	11	1	2	8	16	36	−20	5	
11	Viitorul Vetiș	11	0	2	9	11	37	−26	2	
12	Someșul Odoreu (Note: Someșul Odoreu withdrew before the start of the season.) (R)	0	0	0	0	0	0	0	0	Expelled

Updated to match(es) played on 8 March 2020. Source:
Rules for classification: 1) Points; 2) Head-to-head points; 3) Head-to-head goal difference; 4) Head-to-head goals scored; 5) Head-to-head away goals scored; 6) Goal difference; 7) Goals scored.
(R) Relegated
Notes:

Series C (Crasna Zone)

Pos	Team	Pld	W	D	L	GF	GA	GD	Pts	Qualification or relegation
1	Satu Mare	16	15	1	0	87	5	+82	46	Qualification to championship play-off
2	Victoria Carei	16	15	1	0	82	4	+78	46	Qualification to championship play-off
3	Căpleni	16	12	1	3	52	18	+34	37	
4	Stăruința Berveni	16	10	0	6	40	30	+10	30	
5	Recolta Sanislău	16	8	0	8	39	40	−1	24	
6	Fortuna Căpleni	16	7	3	6	22	46	−24	24	
7	Viitorul Lucăceni	16	6	2	8	26	35	−9	20	
8	Schwaben Kalmandi Cămin	15	6	2	7	22	33	−11	20	
9	Schamagosch Ciumești	15	5	2	8	23	41	−18	17	
10	Frohlich Foieni	14	4	3	7	26	33	−7	15	
11	Real Andrid	16	4	2	10	18	46	−28	14	
12	Victoria Tiream	16	3	4	9	14	33	−19	13	
13	Ghenci	16	2	1	13	19	60	−41	7	
14	Unirea Pișcolt	16	1	2	13	12	58	−46	5	

Updated to match(es) played on 8 March 2020. Source:
Rules for classification: 1) Points; 2) Head-to-head points; 3) Head-to-head goal difference; 4) Head-to-head goals scored; 5) Head-to-head away goals scored; 6) Goal difference; 7) Goals scored.

Championship play-off

On 2 June 2020, AJF Satu Mare (County Football Association) announced that a promotion play-off tournament between the first two ranked teams in each zones will be played to decide the county champion. The season was ended officially on 24 July 2020 when AJF Satu Mare concluded that the teams cannot comply with the conditions imposed by the medical protocol and decided to declare CSM Satu Mare the county champion and the team that qualify to promotion play-off in Liga III.

=== Sălaj County ===
Team changes from the previous season

- Unirea Mirșid achieved promotion to Liga III.
- Flacăra Halmășd (13th place; withdrew) and CS Crasna (14th place; withdrew) were relegated to Liga V Sălaj.
- Luceafărul Bălan (East Series winners) and Sporting Zalău (West Series winners) declined promotion from Liga V Sălaj.
- Steaua Cosniciu was renamed AS Cosniciu.

Pos	Team	Pld	W	D	L	GF	GA	GD	Pts	Qualification or relegation
1	Sportul Șimleu Silvaniei (C, Q)	13	11	1	1	60	9	+51	34	Qualification to promotion play-off
2	Rapid Jibou	13	11	1	1	55	14	+41	34	
3	Dumbrava Gâlgău Almașului	12	9	0	3	45	16	+29	27	
4	Chieșd	12	7	2	3	27	19	+8	23	
5	Barcău Nușfalău	13	5	5	3	28	18	+10	20	
6	Cosniciu	12	4	3	5	30	34	−4	15	
7	Ardealul Crișeni	13	4	2	7	19	37	−18	14	
8	Someșul Someș-Odorhei	13	4	1	8	23	39	−16	13	
9	Silvania Cehu Silvaniei	13	3	0	10	15	40	−25	9	
10	Olimpic Bocșa	13	2	2	9	17	54	−37	8	
11	Ileanda	13	1	1	11	18	57	−39	4	

Updated to match(es) played on 8 March 2020. Source:
Rules for classification: 1) Points; 2) Head-to-head points; 3) Head-to-head goal difference; 4) Head-to-head goals scored; 5) Head-to-head away goals scored; 6) Goal difference; 7) Goals scored.
(C) Champions; (Q) Qualified for the phase indicated

=== Sibiu County ===
Team changes from the previous season

- Viitorul Șelimbăr achieved promotion to Liga III.
- Vulturul Poplaca (West Series winners) and Fraternitas Tălmaciu (East Series winners) were promoted from Liga V Sibiu.
- Viitorul Ațel (Mediaș Series winners) declined promotion from Liga V Sibiu.
- AS Copșa Mică and Interstar Sibiu withdrew.
- FC Tălmaciu (13th place) and ASA Sibiu (14th place) were spared from relegation.
- FC Avrig withdrew from Liga III and was enrolled in Liga IV due to financial reasons.
- Viitorul Șelimbăr II, Athletic Șura Mare and Leii Șura Mică were enrolled upon request.

Pos	Team	Pld	W	D	L	GF	GA	GD	Pts	Qualification or relegation
1	Măgura Cisnădie (Q)	18	17	0	1	108	8	+100	51	Qualification to championship play-off (Note: AJF Sibiu (County Football Association) announced that a promotion play-off tournament between the first three ranked teams will be played to decide the county champion and the team that will qualify for the promotion play-off in Liga III. After FC Avrig decided to withdraw, the season was ended on 26 July after a play-off match between Măgura Cisnădie and Păltiniș Rășinari.)
2	Avrig	18	16	1	1	79	8	+71	49	
3	Păltiniș Rășinari (Q)	17	16	0	1	82	13	+69	48	Qualification to championship play-off
4	Unirea Miercurea Sibiului	18	14	0	4	67	30	+37	42	
5	Viitorul Șelimbăr II	18	12	1	5	59	21	+38	37	
6	Spicul Șeica Mare	18	11	0	7	54	53	+1	33	
7	Progresul Terezian Sibiu	18	10	1	7	32	24	+8	31	
8	Tălmaciu	18	9	3	6	35	34	+1	30	
9	Bradu	18	9	2	7	43	37	+6	29	
10	Agnita	18	5	4	9	31	49	−18	19	
11	Sparta Mediaș	18	6	0	12	47	71	−24	18	
12	Leii Șura Mică	18	4	1	13	28	49	−21	13	
13	Voința Sibiu	18	3	2	13	32	58	−26	11	
14	Vulturul Poplaca	18	3	0	15	35	100	−65	9	
15	Fraternitas Tălmaciu	18	4	2	12	26	56	−30	8 (Note: Fraternitas Tălmaciu deducted 6 points.)	
16	Athletic Șura Mare	18	2	2	14	17	65	−48	8	
17	ASA Sibiu	17	1	1	15	16	115	−99	4	

Updated to match(es) played on 8 March 2020. Source:
Rules for classification: 1) Points; 2) Head-to-head points; 3) Head-to-head goal difference; 4) Head-to-head goals scored; 5) Head-to-head away goals scored; 6) Goal difference; 7) Goals scored.
(Q) Qualified for the phase indicated
Notes:

Championship play-off

26 July 2020	Măgura Cisnădie	5–3	Păltiniș Rășinari	Avrig
17:30 EEST (UTC+3)	Bratima 7'; Dragomir 24'; Risti 49'; Gombar 56'; Stoia 58'	Report	Vintilă 66'; Aldea 89'; Chirilă 90'	Stadium: Orășenesc; Attendance: 0 Referee: Andrei Lucian Țiții (Șura Mică)

Măgura Cisnădie won the Liga IV Sibiu County and qualified for the promotion play-off in Liga III.

=== Suceava County ===
Team changes from the previous season

- Stejarul Cajvana (16th place) was relegated to Liga V Suceava.
- Concordia Grămești (Series I runners-up) was promoted from Liga V Suceava.
- Voința Zvoriștea (Series I winners) and Forestierul Frumosu (Series II winners) declined promotion from Liga V Suceava.
- Viitorul Verești and Vânătorul Dorna Cândrenilor withdrew.
- ASA Rarău Câmpulung Moldovenesc (14th place) and Sporting Poieni Solca (15th place) were spared from relegation.

Pos	Team	Pld	W	D	L	GF	GA	GD	Pts	Qualification or relegation
1	Siretul Dolhasca (C, Q)	15	12	3	0	44	12	+32	39	Qualification to promotion play-off
2	Juniorul Suceava	15	9	4	2	47	18	+29	31	
3	Viitorul Liteni	15	10	1	4	40	24	+16	31	
4	Pojorâta	15	9	2	4	56	34	+22	29	
5	Șomuzul Preutești	15	8	4	3	39	26	+13	28	
6	ASA Rarău Câmpulung Moldovenesc	15	9	1	5	28	22	+6	28	
7	Moldova Drăgușeni	15	7	1	7	47	35	+12	22	
8	Progresul Frătăuții Vechi	15	7	0	8	27	32	−5	21	
9	Victoria Vatra Moldoviței	15	5	3	7	28	30	−2	18	
10	LPS Suceava	15	5	0	10	29	46	−17	15	
11	Concordia Grămești	15	4	1	10	23	50	−27	13	
12	Recolta Fântânele	15	2	3	10	12	34	−22	9	
13	Zimbrul Siret	15	1	5	9	10	33	−23	8	
14	Sporting Poieni Solca	15	2	2	11	20	54	−34	8	

Updated to match(es) played on 8 March 2020. Source:
Rules for classification: 1) Points; 2) Head-to-head points; 3) Head-to-head goal difference; 4) Head-to-head goals scored; 5) Head-to-head away goals scored; 6) Goal difference; 7) Goals scored.
(C) Champions; (Q) Qualified for the phase indicated

=== Teleorman County ===
Team changes from the previous season

- Steaua Spătărei (Series II winners) and Avântul Stejaru (Series I runners-up and play-off winners (Note: Avântul Stejaru defeated CS Vitănești 2–1, the runner-up of Series II, in the promotion play-off.)) were promoted from Liga V Teleorman.
- Inter Purani (Series I winners) declined promotion from Liga V Teleorman.
- Unirea Brânceni and Dunărea Zimnicea withdrew.
- Unirea Moșteni (14th place) and Atletic Orbeasca (15th place) were spared from relegation.
- Cetatea Turnu Măgurele was admitted upon request.

Pos	Team	Pld	W	D	L	GF	GA	GD	Pts	Qualification or relegation
1	Unirea Țigănești (C, Q)	18	16	1	1	61	15	+46	49	Qualification to promotion play-off
2	Ajax Botoroaga	18	15	0	3	82	22	+60	45	
3	Rapid Buzescu	18	15	0	3	78	18	+60	45	
4	Avântul Bragadiru	18	12	3	3	73	27	+46	39	
5	Astra Plosca	18	12	1	5	56	30	+26	37	
6	Voința Saelele 2017	18	9	2	7	69	38	+31	29	
7	Metalul Peretu	18	8	3	7	35	31	+4	27	
8	Steaua Spătărei	18	8	2	8	39	54	−15	26	
9	Atletic Orbeasca	18	7	0	11	50	74	−24	21	
10	Alexandria II	18	6	2	10	41	45	−4	20	
11	Unirea Moșteni	18	6	2	10	24	52	−28	20	
12	Drăgănești-Vlașca	18	4	3	11	28	63	−35	15	
13	Cetatea Turnu Măgurele	18	5	0	13	41	90	−49	15	
14	Victoria Lunca	18	4	1	13	26	61	−35	13	
15	Viitorul Butești	18	3	1	14	27	73	−46	10	
16	Avântul Stejaru	18	2	3	13	25	62	−37	9	

Updated to match(es) played on 7 March 2020. Source:
Rules for classification: 1) Points; 2) Head-to-head points; 3) Head-to-head goal difference; 4) Head-to-head goals scored; 5) Head-to-head away goals scored; 6) Goal difference; 7) Goals scored.
(C) Champions; (Q) Qualified for the phase indicated

=== Timiș County ===
Team changes from the previous season

- Fortuna Becicherecu Mic achieved promotion to Liga III.
- CSM Lugoj and Millenium Giarmata were relegated from Liga III.
- Flacăra Parța (15th place), CSO Făget (16th place), FC Bazoșu Vechi (17th place), and CSM Lugoj II (18th place) were relegated to Liga V Timiș.
- UVT Timișoara (Series I winners), Rapid Săcălaz (Series II winners), and Phoenix Buziaș (Series III winners) were promoted from Liga V Timiș.
- ACS Carani Murani was renamed ACS Carani.

Pos	Team	Pld	W	D	L	GF	GA	GD	Pts	Qualification or relegation
1	Avântul Periam (C, Q)	18	13	1	4	53	29	+24	40	Qualification to promotion play-off
2	Timișul Șag	18	12	2	4	35	15	+20	38	
3	UVT Timișoara	18	11	3	4	52	24	+28	36	
4	Carani	18	9	6	3	41	24	+17	33	
5	Phoenix Buziaș	18	10	3	5	37	20	+17	33	
6	Lugoj	18	8	5	5	38	24	+14	29	
7	Dudeștii Noi	18	8	5	5	36	29	+7	29	
8	Unirea Tomnatic	18	7	6	5	33	31	+2	27	
9	Pobeda Stár Bišnov	18	8	3	7	28	31	−3	27	
10	Cocoșul Orțișoara	18	7	5	6	35	31	+4	26	
11	Unirea Sânnicolau Mare	18	6	5	7	37	38	−1	23	
12	Deta	18	5	6	7	25	29	−4	21	
13	Voința Mașloc	18	6	2	10	33	44	−11	20	
14	Millenium Giarmata	18	4	5	9	31	43	−12	17	
15	Rapid Săcălaz	18	3	7	8	17	34	−17	16	
16	Progresul Ciacova	18	3	4	11	22	48	−26	13	
17	Seceani	18	3	3	12	26	55	−29	12	
18	Peciu Nou	18	2	3	13	23	53	−30	9	

Updated to match(es) played on 7 March 2020. Source:
Rules for classification: 1) Points; 2) Head-to-head points; 3) Head-to-head goal difference; 4) Head-to-head goals scored; 5) Head-to-head away goals scored; 6) Goal difference; 7) Goals scored.
(C) Champions; (Q) Qualified for the phase indicated

=== Tulcea County ===
Team changes from the previous season

- Sarica Niculițel, Egreta Sabangia, Ceres Min Ceamurlia de Jos and AS Dăeni withdrew.
- Viitorul Murighiol, Viitorul Horia, Progresul Isaccea and Triumf Cerna were admitted upon request.

Pos	Team	Pld	W	D	L	GF	GA	GD	Pts	Qualification or relegation
1	Pescărușul Sarichioi (C, Q)	9	9	0	0	54	10	+44	27	Qualification to promotion play-off
2	Flacăra Mihail Kogălniceanu	9	7	1	1	51	12	+39	22	
3	Granitul Babadag	9	6	0	3	33	28	+5	18	
4	Șoimii Topolog	9	5	2	2	39	17	+22	17	
5	Viitorul Murighiol	9	5	1	3	25	13	+12	16	
6	Național Somova	9	3	2	4	22	27	−5	11	
7	Viitorul Horia	9	3	0	6	20	25	−5	9	
8	Progresul Isaccea	9	1	3	5	18	56	−38	6	
9	Triumf Cerna	9	1	1	7	22	63	−41	4	
10	Beroe Ostrov	9	0	0	9	11	44	−33	0	

Updated to match(es) played on 17 November 2019. Source:
Rules for classification: 1) Points; 2) Head-to-head points; 3) Head-to-head goal difference; 4) Head-to-head goals scored; 5) Head-to-head away goals scored; 6) Goal difference; 7) Goals scored.
(C) Champions; (Q) Qualified for the phase indicated

=== Vaslui County ===
Team changes from the previous season

- Hușana Huși achieved promotion to Liga III.
- Unirea Negrești (Series I winners, Group A play-off winners) and FC Crețești (Series III winners, Group B play-off winners) were promoted from Liga V Vaslui.
- Viitorul Vetrișoaia (Series III 3rd place, Group B play-off runners-up) was promoted from Liga V Vaslui via the promotion/relegation play-offs.
- ACS Moara Domnească (10th place, play-off losers) and Juventus Fălciu (11th place, play-off losers) were relegated to Liga V Vaslui.
- Sporting Bârlad was spared from relegation.
- Sporting Juniorul Vaslui was admitted upon request.
- Unirea Negrești was renamed CSO Negrești.

Pos	Team	Pld	W	D	L	GF	GA	GD	Pts	Qualification or relegation
1	Sporting Juniorul Vaslui (C, Q)	13	13	0	0	104	2	+102	39	Qualification to promotion play-off
2	Vaslui	13	11	0	2	64	13	+51	33	
3	Rapid Brodoc	13	8	0	5	36	23	+13	24	
4	Gârceni	13	7	0	6	33	26	+7	21	
5	Vulturești	13	6	3	4	28	31	−3	21	
6	Sporting Bârlad	12	6	1	5	26	27	−1	19	
7	Atletic Bârlad	12	4	3	5	15	25	−10	15	
8	Crețești	13	4	3	6	24	66	−42	15	
9	Vitis Șuletea	13	3	4	6	19	43	−24	13	
10	Racova Pușcași	13	4	0	9	14	33	−19	12	
11	Negrești	13	3	2	8	23	43	−20	11	
12	Viitorul Vetrișoaia	13	3	0	10	21	54	−33	9	
13	Flacăra Muntenii de Sus	12	2	2	8	22	43	−21	8	

Updated to match(es) played on 8 March 2020. Source:
Rules for classification: 1) Points; 2) Head-to-head points; 3) Head-to-head goal difference; 4) Head-to-head goals scored; 5) Head-to-head away goals scored; 6) Goal difference; 7) Goals scored.
(C) Champions; (Q) Qualified for the phase indicated

=== Vâlcea County ===
Team changes from the previous season

- Viitorul Dăești achieved promotion to Liga III.
- Oltețul Alunu (11th place) and AS Mihăești (12th place) were relegated to Liga V Vâlcea.
- AS Băile Olănești (North Series winners) and Oltul Ionești (South Series winners) were promoted from Liga V Vâlcea.
- Viitorul Valea Mare (South Series runners-up and promotion/relegation play-offs winners) declined promotion from Liga V Vâlcea.
- DCM Râmnicu Vâlcea and AS Râmnicu Vâlcea withdrew.
- AFC Băbeni was spared from relegation.
- FC Păușești Otăsău, Viitorul Budești and Oltul Drăgoești were admitted upon request.

Pos	Team	Pld	W	D	L	GF	GA	GD	Pts	Qualification or relegation
1	Minerul Costești (C, Q)	19	18	0	1	99	26	+73	54	Qualification to promotion play-off
2	Cozia Călimănești	19	13	3	3	72	40	+32	42	
3	Băbeni	19	12	4	3	75	41	+34	40	
4	Chimia 1973 Râmnicu Vâlcea	19	12	2	5	75	48	+27	38	
5	Păușești Otăsău	19	12	0	7	84	59	+25	36	
6	Oltul Drăgoești	19	9	2	8	48	44	+4	29	
7	Unirea Tomșani	19	7	4	8	57	64	−7	25	
8	Viitorul Budești	19	6	0	13	43	89	−46	18	
9	Băile Olănești	19	5	2	12	53	66	−13	17	
10	Oltul Ionești	19	5	0	14	33	61	−28	15	
11	Orlești	19	3	2	14	27	77	−50	11	Spared from relegation
12	Stejarul Vlădești	19	2	1	16	39	90	−51	7	Spared from relegation

Updated to match(es) played on 7 March 2019. Source:
Rules for classification: 1) Points; 2) Head-to-head points; 3) Head-to-head goal difference; 4) Head-to-head goals scored; 5) Head-to-head away goals scored; 6) Goal difference; 7) Goals scored.
(C) Champions; (Q) Qualified for the phase indicated

=== Vrancea County ===
Team changes from the previous season

- FCM Adjud, Mausoleul Mărășești, Voința Cârligele and Voința Răstoaca withdrew.
- Voința Slobozia Ciorăști, Unirea Milcovul, Național Golești and Siretul Suraia were admitted upon request.

Group A

Pos	Team	Pld	W	D	L	GF	GA	GD	Pts	Qualification
1	Sportul Ciorăști	10	10	0	0	44	9	+35	30	Qualification to championship play-off
2	Voința Slobozia Ciorăști	10	5	1	4	23	25	−2	16	Qualification to championship play-off
3	Unirea Milcovul	10	4	0	6	22	23	−1	12	
4	Tractorul Nănești	10	3	1	6	20	27	−7	10	
5	Victoria Zimbrul Bordeasca	10	3	1	6	13	28	−15	10	
6	Dinamo Tătăranu	10	2	3	5	13	23	−10	9	

Rules for classification: 1) Points; 2) Head-to-head points; 3) Head-to-head goal difference; 4) Head-to-head goals scored; 5) Head-to-head away goals scored; 6) Goal difference; 7) Goals scored.

Group B

Pos	Team	Pld	W	D	L	GF	GA	GD	Pts	Qualification
1	Victoria Gugești	8	7	1	0	38	3	+35	22	Qualification to championship play-off
2	Săgeata Biliești	8	4	2	2	16	17	−1	14	Ineligible for promotion (Note: Săgeata Biliești was not allowed to participate in the championship play-off, as it did not have a junior team registered in the championship.)
3	Național Golești	8	2	3	3	10	17	−7	9	Qualification to championship play-off
4	Dumbrăveni	8	1	3	4	10	13	−3	6	Qualification to championship play-off
5	Siretul Suraia	8	1	1	6	9	33	−24	4	

Rules for classification: 1) Points; 2) Head-to-head points; 3) Head-to-head goal difference; 4) Head-to-head goals scored; 5) Head-to-head away goals scored; 6) Goal difference; 7) Goals scored.
Notes:

Group C

Pos	Team	Pld	W	D	L	GF	GA	GD	Pts	Qualification
1	Panciu	8	7	1	0	35	3	+32	22	Qualification to championship play-off
2	Homocea	8	4	1	3	16	21	−5	13	Qualification to championship play-off
3	Unirea Țifești	8	3	3	2	25	14	+11	12	Qualification to championship play-off
4	Jariștea	8	2	1	5	14	26	−12	7	
5	Trotușul Ruginești	8	0	2	6	8	34	−26	2	

Rules for classification: 1) Points; 2) Head-to-head points; 3) Head-to-head goal difference; 4) Head-to-head goals scored; 5) Head-to-head away goals scored; 6) Goal difference; 7) Goals scored.

Championship play-off

Pos	Team	Pld	W	D	L	GF	GA	GD	Pts	Qualification
1	Sportul Ciorăști	2	2	0	0	9	2	+7	6	Ineligible for promotion
2	Victoria Gugești (Q)	2	2	0	0	8	1	+7	6	Qualification to promotion play-off (Note: AJF Vrancea concluded on 7 July 2020 that no team could meet the medical conditions for matches at this level and ended the season without awarding the title of county champion. Victoria Gugești was designated the representative of Vrancea County in the promotion play-off to Liga III, being the only team that announced that it can comply with the conditions imposed by the medical protocol.)
3	Panciu	2	1	1	0	4	3	+1	4	
4	Unirea Țifești	2	0	1	1	4	5	−1	1	
5	Dumbrăveni	2	0	1	1	4	6	−2	1	
6	Național Golești	2	0	1	1	3	6	−3	1	
7	Homocea	2	0	1	1	1	5	−4	1	
8	Voința Slobozia Ciorăști	2	0	1	1	2	7	−5	1	

Updated to match(es) played on 8 March 2020. Source:
Rules for classification: 1) Points; 2) Head-to-head points; 3) Head-to-head goal difference; 4) Head-to-head goals scored; 5) Head-to-head away goals scored; 6) Goal difference; 7) Goals scored.
(Q) Qualified for the phase indicated

== See also ==
- 2019–20 Liga I
- 2019–20 Liga II
- 2019–20 Liga III
- 2019–20 Cupa României
