= Drăganu =

- Commune
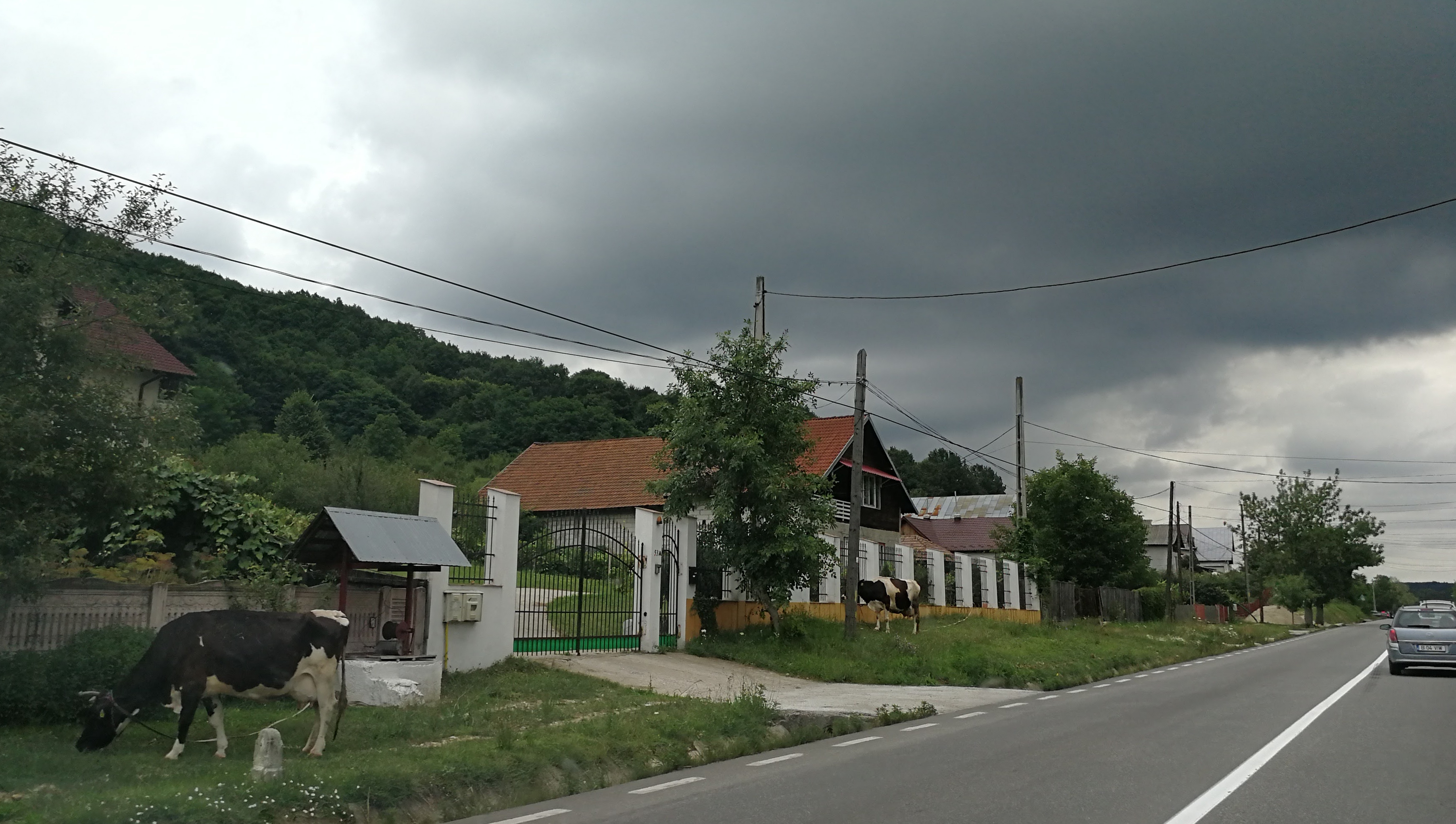
- Prislopu Mare

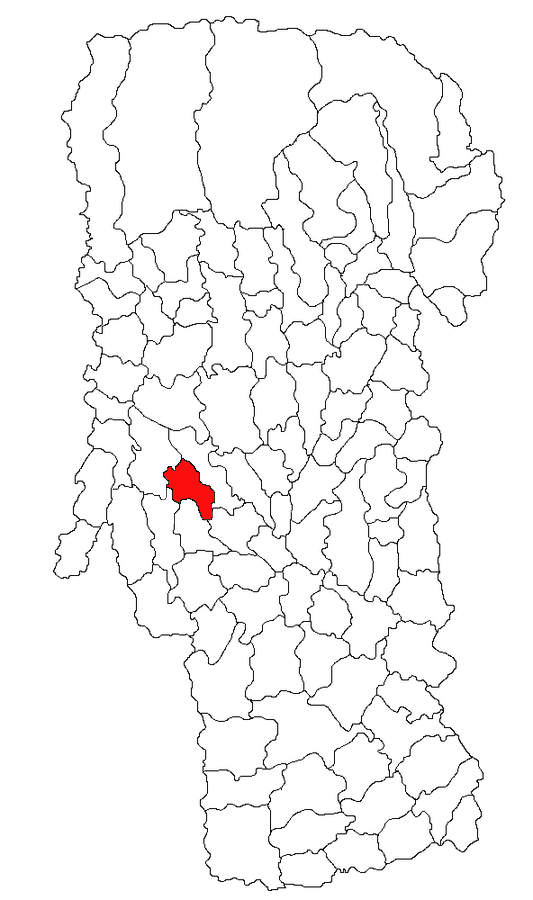
- Location in Argeș County

- Location in Romania
- Coordinates: 44°55′34″N 24°42′39″E
- Country: Romania
- County: Argeș

Government
  - Mayor (2024–2028): Claudiu Lucian Stan (PSD)
- Area: 35.23 km^{2} (13.60 sq mi)
- Elevation: 370 m (1,210 ft)
- Population (2021-12-01): 1,972
  - Density: 55.98/km^{2} (145.0/sq mi)
- Time zone: UTC+02:00 (EET)
  - Summer (DST): UTC+03:00 (EEST)
- Postal code: 117380
- Area code: +(40) 248
- Vehicle reg.: AG
- Website: www.cjarges.ro/en/web/draganu/

Drăganu is a commune in Argeș County, Muntenia, Romania. It is composed of four villages: Băcești, Drăganu-Olteni (the commune centre), Dumbrăvești, and Prislopu Mare.
