= Bascov =

- Commune
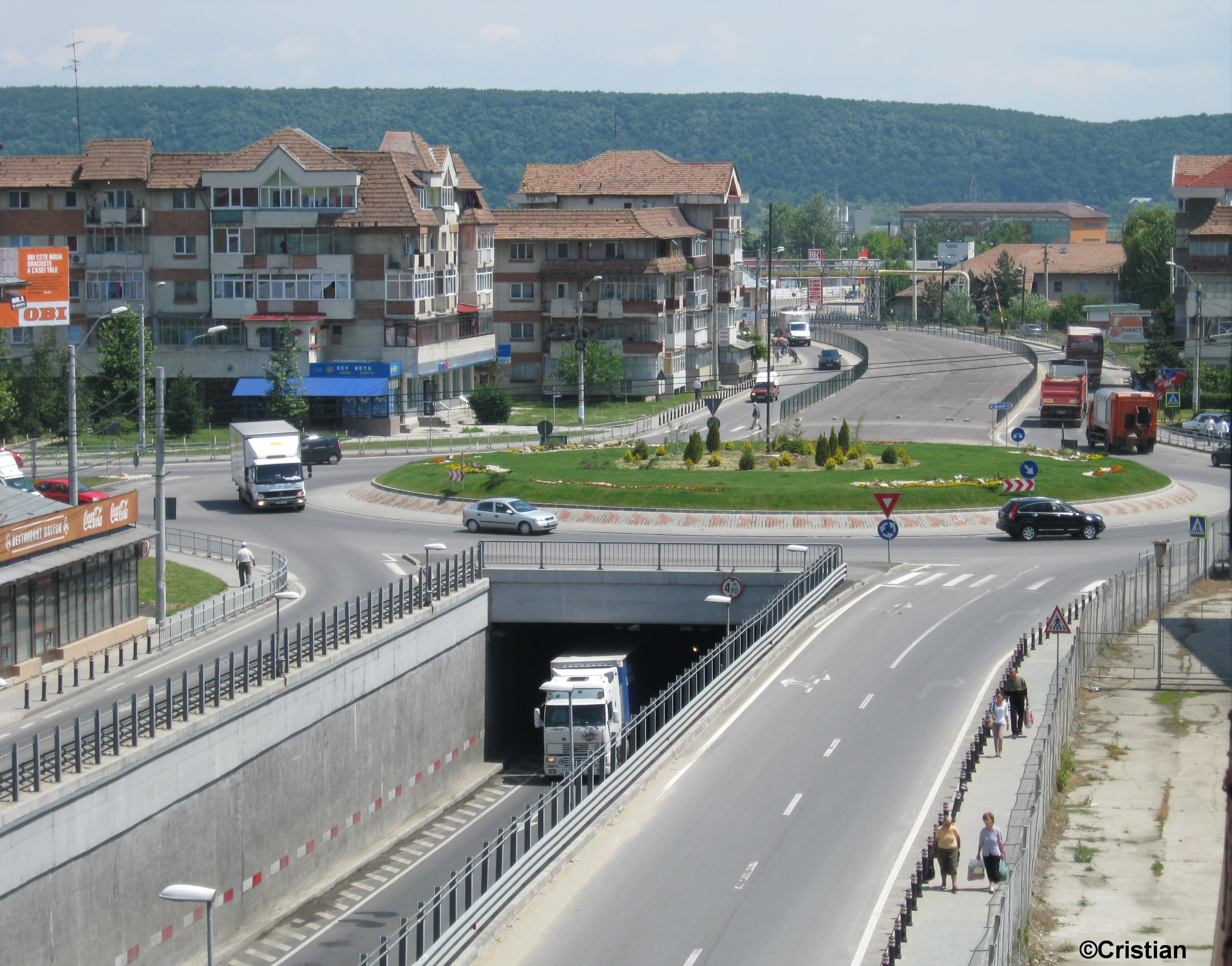
- Downtown Bascov

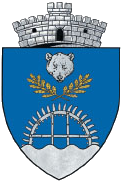
- Coat of arms

- Location in Romania
- Coordinates: 44°54′N 24°49′E
- Country: Romania
- County: Argeș

Government
  - Mayor (2020–2024): Gheorghe Stancu (PSD)
- Elevation: 423 m (1,388 ft)
- Population (2021-12-01): 11,151
- Time zone: UTC+02:00 (EET)
  - Summer (DST): UTC+03:00 (EEST)
- Postal code: 117045
- Area code: 0248
- Vehicle reg.: AG
- Website: www.primariabascov.ro

Bascov is a commune in Argeș County, Muntenia, Romania. It is composed of eight villages: Bascov, Brăileni, Glâmbocu, Mica, Prislopu Mic, Schiau, Uiasca, and Valea Ursului.

Historical population
Year	Pop.	±%
2002	8,876	—
2011	10,218	+15.1%
2021	11,151	+9.1%
Source: Census data

The commune lies on the Getic Plateau, an area of foothills leading up to the Southern Carpathians. It is located 7 km (4.3 mi) northwest of Pitești, on the river Bascov, as it discharges into the Argeș.

The Liga III football club ACS Unirea Bascov is located here.

A massacre took place in Bascov in August 2022, when five members of the same family were killed by a relative.
