= 2020–21 Liga IV =

79th season of Romanian football league

Liga IV
- Season: 2020–21

The 2020–21 Liga IV was the 79th season of Liga IV and the 53rd since the 1968 administrative and territorial reorganization of the country, representing the fourth tier of the Romanian football league system. The champions of each county association played against one from a neighbouring county in a play-off for promotion to Liga III.

The season was initially postponed due to the high costs generated by COVID-19 pandemic, but on 7 April 2021, the Romanian Football Federation approved a new protocol for the amateur leagues, with lower costs. The county associations had only a month to play a blitzkrieg season, but only 24 leagues (out of 42) had a competition and announced a champion in time, three other county associations (Călărași, Giurgiu and Vrancea) organized a competition, but which ended after the deadline imposed by the FRF.

The promotion play-off was played in two rounds. First round was played between 6 winners of Liga IV (chosen randomly), consisting of 3 matches played on neutral ground. The second round was played as a promotion/relegation play-off, between last two teams of each 2020–21 Liga III series (2X10) and the county leagues winners.

== County leagues ==
North–East

- Bacău (BC)
- Botoșani (BT)
- Iași (IS)
- Neamț (NT)
- Suceava (SV)
- Vaslui (VS)

North–West

- Bihor (BH)
- Bistrița-Năsăud (BN)
- Cluj (CJ)
- Maramureș (MM)
- Satu Mare (SM)
- Sălaj (SJ)

Center

- Alba (AB)
- Brașov (BV)
- Covasna (CV)
- Harghita (HR)
- Mureș (MS)
- Sibiu (SB)

West

- Arad (AR)
- Caraș-Severin (CS)
- Gorj (GJ)
- Hunedoara (HD)
- Mehedinți (MH)
- Timiș (TM)

South–West

- Argeș (AG)
- Dâmbovița (DB)
- Dolj (DJ)
- Olt (OT)
- Teleorman (TR)
- Vâlcea (VL)

South

- Bucharest (B)
- Călărași (CL)
- Giurgiu (GR)
- Ialomița (IL)
- Ilfov (IF)
- Prahova (PH)

South–East

- Brăila (BR)
- Buzău (BZ)
- Constanța (CT)
- Galați (GL)
- Tulcea (TL)
- Vrancea (VN)

== Preliminary round ==
Team 1	Score	Team 2
Viitorul Cluj (CJ)	2–2	(BC) Dinamo Bacău
Avrig (SB)	0–4	(PH) Petrolul 95 Ploiești
Victoria Carei (SM)	0–3	(AG) Real Bradu

12 May 2021	Viitorul Cluj (CJ)	2–2 (a.e.t.) (3–4 p)	Dinamo Bacău (BC)	Odorheiu Secuiesc
17:00 EEST (UTC+3)	Fărăgău 25' (pen.); Pintea 44'	Report	Patriche 28'; Brăescu 69'	Stadium: Municipal; Attendance: 0 Referee: Valentin Naidin (Turnu Măgurele)
	Penalties
	Râză (penalty scored); Pintea (penalty scored); Duda (penalty scored)		Tofan (penalty scored); Patriche (penalty scored); Furtună (penalty scored); Juncu (penalty scored)

12 May 2021	Avrig (SB)	0–4	Petrolul 95 Ploiești (PH)	Brașov
17:00 EEST (UTC+3)		Report	G. Dumitru 7'; Ţînţaru 59'; Dr. Dumitru 87', 90+4'	Stadium: ICIM; Attendance: 0 Referee: Octavian Ciucanu (Brașov)

12 May 2021	Victoria Carei' (SM)	0–3	Real Bradu (AG)	Mediaș
17:00 EEST (UTC+3)		Report	Năstăsie 15'; Păvăluță 86'; Păun 90+2'	Stadium: Gaz Metan; Attendance: 0 Referee: Dragoș Lunca (Cluj-Napoca)

== Promotion/relegation play-off ==
Team 1	Agg.	Team 2	1st leg	2nd leg
Region 1				
Dinamo Bacău (BC)	w/o	(L3) Bradu Borca	w/o	w/o
Pașcani (L3)	7–1	(VS) Vaslui	2–1	5–0
Odorheiu Secuiesc (L3)	4–1	(SV) Viitorul Liteni	2–0	2–1
Region 2				
Team Săgeata (BZ)	2–5	(L3) Avântul Valea Mărului	1–3	1–2
Sportul Chiscani (L3)	w/o	(CT) Ovidiu	w/o	w/o
Făurei (L3)	2–2	(IL) Fetești	2–2	0–0
Region 3				
Oltenița (L3)	4–4	(PH) Petrolul 95 Ploiești	0–3	4–1
Rapid Buzescu (TR)	0–5	(L3) Recolta Gheorghe Doja	0–3	0–2
Academica Clinceni II (L3)	3–3	(IF) Viitorul Domnești	1–1	2–2
Region 4				
Balotești (L3)	0–6	(AG) Real Bradu	0–2	0–4
Concordia Chiajna II (L3)	6–2	(BV) Codlea	3–1	3–1
Băbeni (VL)	3–11	(L3) Kids Tâmpa Brașov	3–4	0–7
Region 5				
Universitatea Craiova II (L3)	1–3	(CS) Voința Lupac	1–0	0–3
Dunărea Calafat (DJ)	1–4	(L3) Progresul Ezeriș	1–1	0–3
Viitorul Șimian (MH)	5–5	(L3) Minerul Costești	2–1	3–4
Region 6				
Industria Galda (L3)	1–2	(TM) Pobeda Stár Bišnov	0–0	1–2
Hermannstadt II (L3)	4–5	(AR) Frontiera Curtici	1–2	3–3
Aurul Brad (HD)	5–3	(L3) Fortuna Becicherecu Mic	3–1	2–2
Region 7				
Rapid Jibou (SJ)	4–7	(L3) Luceafărul Oradea	1–1	3–6
Ocna Mureș (L3)	8–4	(MS) Iernut	3–0	5–4
Progresul Șomcuta Mare (L3)	6–2	(MM) Sighetu Marmației	3–1	3–1

== League standings ==
=== Arad County ===
A total of nine teams from the previous season participated in this short tournament, while Podgoria Pâncota, CS Beliu, and CS Glogovăț announced that they could not comply with the conditions imposed by the medical protocol.

Pos	Team	Pld	W	D	L	GF	GA	GD	Pts	Qualification
1	Frontiera Curtici (C, Q)	8	6	1	1	17	8	+9	19	Qualification to promotion play-off
2	Socodor	8	5	2	1	20	13	+7	17	
3	Ineu	8	5	1	2	11	5	+6	16	
4	Unirea Sântana	8	4	1	3	20	10	+10	13	
5	Șoimii Șimand	8	3	3	2	15	12	+3	12	
6	Victoria Felnac	8	3	2	3	17	11	+6	11	
7	Păulișana Păuliș	8	2	1	5	17	16	+1	7	
8	Victoria Zăbrani	8	2	1	5	10	12	−2	7	
9	UTA Arad II	8	0	0	8	4	44	−40	0	

Rules for classification: 1) Points; 2) Head-to-head points; 3) Head-to-head goal difference; 4) Head-to-head goals scored; 5) Head-to-head away goals scored; 6) Goal difference; 7) Goals scored.
(C) Champions; (Q) Qualified for the phase indicated

Results

Home \ Away	FRO	SOC	INE	SÂN	ȘIM	FEL	PĂU	ZBR	UTA
Frontiera Curtici			2–1		4–1		4–2		
Socodor	2–1			3–2		4–1		4–1	
Ineu		3–0			0–0		1–0		
Unirea Sântana	1–2		3–1			3–0		1–1	
Șoimii Șimand		1–1		3–2		0–0		2–4	6–1
Victoria Felnac	1–1		0–1				3–0	2–1	10–1
Păulișana Păuliș		3–3		0–2	0–2				11–1
Victoria Zăbrani	0–1		0–1				0–1		3–0
UTA Arad II	0–2	1–3	0–3	0–6					

Source: AJF Arad
Legend: Blue = home team win; Yellow = draw; Red = away team win.

=== Argeș County ===
Voința Budeasa achieved promotion to Liga III, while nine other teams from the previous season participated in this short tournament, along with Energia Stolnici, the Liga V Argeș South Series leader at the moment of the interruption in March 2020. Muscelul Câmpulung was renamed Inter Câmpulung.

Group A

Pos	Team	Pld	W	D	L	GF	GA	GD	Pts	Qualification
1	Real Bradu (Q)	4	4	0	0	19	4	+15	12	Qualification to championship play-off
2	Recea (Q)	4	2	1	1	9	12	−3	7	Qualification to championship play-off
3	Energia Stolnici	4	2	0	2	13	8	+5	6	
4	Victoria Buzoești	4	1	1	2	5	9	−4	4	
5	Suseni	4	0	0	4	4	17	−13	0	

Rules for classification: 1) Points; 2) Head-to-head points; 3) Head-to-head goal difference; 4) Head-to-head goals scored; 5) Head-to-head away goals scored; 6) Goal difference; 7) Goals scored.
(Q) Qualified for the phase indicated

Results

Home \ Away	BRA	CSR	ENE	VIC	SUS
Real Bradu		7–1			5–0
Recea			3–1		3–2
Energia Stolnici	1–3			3–0	
Victoria Buzoești	2–4	2–2			
Suseni			2–8	0–1	

Source: AJF Argeș
Legend: Blue = home team win; Yellow = draw; Red = away team win.

Group B

Pos	Team	Pld	W	D	L	GF	GA	GD	Pts	Qualification
1	Poiana Lacului (Q)	4	2	1	1	12	9	+3	7	Qualification to championship play-off
2	Gloria Berevoești (Q)	4	2	1	1	5	4	+1	7	Qualification to championship play-off
3	Inter Câmpulung	4	1	2	1	7	7	0	5	
4	Vulturii Priboieni	4	1	1	2	9	9	0	4	
5	Juventus Bascov	4	1	1	2	11	15	−4	4	

Rules for classification: 1) Points; 2) Head-to-head points; 3) Head-to-head goal difference; 4) Head-to-head goals scored; 5) Head-to-head away goals scored; 6) Goal difference; 7) Goals scored.
(Q) Qualified for the phase indicated

Results

Home \ Away	POI	GLB	INT	PRI	JUV
Poiana Lacului		2–1		5–2	
Gloria Berevoești			0–0		2–1
Inter Câmpulung	2–1			1–1	
Vulturii Priboieni		1–2			5–1
Juventus Bascov	4–4		5–4		

Source: AJF Argeș
Legend: Blue = home team win; Yellow = draw; Red = away team win.

Championship play-off
Semi-finals

Team 1	Score	Team 2
Real Bradu	3–0	Gloria Berevoești
Recea	0–5	Poiana Lacului

Final

Team 1	Agg.	Team 2	1st leg	2nd leg
Real Bradu	10–0	Poiana Lacului	5–0	5–0

Real Bradu won the Liga IV Argeș County and qualified for the promotion play-off to Liga III.

=== Bacău County ===
A total of four teams from the previous season participated in this short tournament.

Pos	Team	Pld	W	D	L	GF	GA	GD	Pts	Qualification
1	Dinamo Bacău (Q)	6	6	0	0	26	2	+24	18	Qualification to championship final
2	Viitorul Curița (Q)	6	4	0	2	17	5	+12	12	Qualification to championship final
3	Faraoani	6	2	0	4	6	16	−10	6	
4	Gauss Bacău	6	0	0	6	3	29	−26	0	

Rules for classification: 1) Points; 2) Head-to-head points; 3) Head-to-head goal difference; 4) Head-to-head goals scored; 5) Head-to-head away goals scored; 6) Goal difference; 7) Goals scored.
(Q) Qualified for the phase indicated

Results

Home \ Away	DIN	CUR	FAR	GAU
Dinamo Bacău		2–1	6–0	8–1
Viitorul Curița	0–2		5–0	5–0
Faraoani	0–3	0–1		3–0
Gauss Bacău	0–5	1–5	1–3	

Source: AJF Bacău
Legend: Blue = home team win; Yellow = draw; Red = away team win.

Championship final

Team 1	Score	Team 2
Dinamo Bacău	1–1 (a.e.t.) (5–4 p)	Viitorul Curița

Dinamo Bacău won the Liga IV Bacău and qualified for the promotion play-off to Liga III.

=== Brașov County ===
Corona Brașov achieved promotion to Liga III, while a total of five other teams from the previous season participated in this short tournament.

Pos	Team	Pld	W	D	L	GF	GA	GD	Pts	Qualification
1	Codlea	6	4	2	0	17	4	+13	14	Qualification to championship play-off
2	Steagu Roșu Brașov	6	3	1	2	7	7	0	10	Qualification to championship play-off
3	Olimpic Zărnești	6	2	1	3	10	10	0	7	Qualification to championship play-off
4	Colțea Brașov	6	0	2	4	6	19	−13	2	Qualification to championship play-off
5	Precizia Săcele (Note: Precizia Săcele withdrew from the championship and all its results were canceled.) (D)	0	0	0	0	0	0	0	0	Withdrew

Rules for classification: 1) Points; 2) Head-to-head points; 3) Head-to-head goal difference; 4) Head-to-head goals scored; 5) Head-to-head away goals scored; 6) Goal difference; 7) Goals scored.
(D) Disqualified
Notes:

Results

Home \ Away	COD	STE	ZĂR	COL	PRE
Codlea		1–1	2–1	7–0	~~1–2~~
Steagu Roșu Brașov	0–3		0–2	2–0	~~0–4~~
Olimpic Zărnești	1–3	0–1		4–2	~~0–0~~
Colțea Brașov	1–1	1–3	2–2		~~27 April~~
Precizia Săcele	~~23 April~~	~~1–0~~	~~2–1~~	~~3–1~~	

Source: AJF Brașov
Legend: Blue = home team win; Yellow = draw; Red = away team win.

Championship play-off

Pos	Team	Pld	W	D	L	GF	GA	GD	Pts	Qualification
1	Codlea (C, Q)	3	2	0	1	20	6	+14	20	Qualification to promotion play-off
2	Steagu Roșu Brașov	3	2	0	1	12	12	0	16	
3	Olimpic Zărnești	3	2	0	1	17	12	+5	13	
4	Colțea Brașov	3	0	0	3	8	27	−19	2	

Rules for classification: 1) Points; 2) Head-to-head points; 3) Head-to-head goal difference; 4) Head-to-head goals scored; 5) Head-to-head away goals scored; 6) Goal difference; 7) Goals scored.
(C) Champions; (Q) Qualified for the phase indicated

Results

Home \ Away	COD	STE	ZĂR	COL
Codlea		2–0		1–0
Steagu Roșu Brașov			2–1	3–2
Olimpic Zărnești	2–0			
Colțea Brașov			1–4	

Source: AJF Brașov
Legend: Blue = home team win; Yellow = draw; Red = away team win.

=== Buzău County ===
CSM Râmnicu Sărat achieved promotion to Liga III, while a total of four other teams from the previous season participated in this short tournament. Gloria Vadu Pașii was renamed CS Vadu Pașii.

Pos	Team	Pld	W	D	L	GF	GA	GD	Pts	Qualification
1	Team Săgeata (Q)	6	5	0	1	12	7	+5	15	Qualification to championship final
2	Vadu Pașii (Q)	6	4	0	2	12	10	+2	12	Qualification to championship final
3	Voința Lanurile	6	3	0	3	10	7	+3	9	
4	Viitorul Berca	6	0	0	6	8	18	−10	0	

Rules for classification: 1) Points; 2) Head-to-head points; 3) Head-to-head goal difference; 4) Head-to-head goals scored; 5) Head-to-head away goals scored; 6) Goal difference; 7) Goals scored.
(Q) Qualified for the phase indicated

Results

Home \ Away	TSG	VDP	VLN	VBE
Team Săgeata		1–2	2–1	5–4
Vadu Pașii	0–1		1–4	5–3
Voința Lanurile	0–1	1–2		2–0
Viitorul Berca	0–2	0–2	1–2	

Source: AJF Buzău
Legend: Blue = home team win; Yellow = draw; Red = away team win.

Championship final

The match took place on 8 May 2021 at Petrolul Stadium in Berca.

Team 1	Score	Team 2
Team Săgeata	1–0	Vadu Pașii

Team Săgeata won the Liga IV Buzău and qualified for the promotion play-off to Liga III.

=== Caraș-Severin County ===
Progresul Ezeriș achieved promotion to Liga III, while a total of four other teams from the previous season participated in this short tournament.

Pos	Team	Pld	W	D	L	GF	GA	GD	Pts	Qualification
1	Voința Lupac (Q)	6	5	0	1	20	7	+13	15	Qualification to championship final
2	Nera Bozovici (Q)	6	4	1	1	13	9	+4	13	Qualification to championship final
3	Slatina-Timiș	6	1	1	4	10	13	−3	4	
4	Oravița	6	1	0	5	8	22	−14	3	

Rules for classification: 1) Points; 2) Head-to-head points; 3) Head-to-head goal difference; 4) Head-to-head goals scored; 5) Head-to-head away goals scored; 6) Goal difference; 7) Goals scored.
(Q) Qualified for the phase indicated

Results

Home \ Away	VLP	NER	SLT	ORA
Voința Lupac		6–0	2–0	4–1
Nera Bozovici	5–1		3–0	2–0
Slatina-Timiș	0–2	1–1		7–2
Oravița	1–5	1–2	3–2	

Source: AJF Caraș-Severin
Legend: Blue = home team win; Yellow = draw; Red = away team win.

Championship final

The championship final was played on 8 May 2021 at Voința Stadium in Lupac.

Team 1	Score	Team 2
Voința Lupac	4–0	Nera Bozovici

Voința Lupac won the Liga IV Caraș-Severin and qualified for the promotion play-off to Liga III.

=== Călărași County ===
CSM Oltenița achieved promotion to Liga III, while six teams from the previous season, along with two teams from Liga V Călărași, Rapid Ulmeni and Progresul Perișoru, participated in this short tournament. However, the competition ended after the deadline set by the FRF, and the Călărași County winner did not participate in the promotion play-off.

Pos	Team	Pld	W	D	L	GF	GA	GD	Pts	Qualification
1	Venus Independența (C)	7	5	1	1	19	9	+10	16	Champions
2	Roseți	7	5	1	1	21	9	+12	16	
3	Dunărea Ciocănești	7	4	1	2	24	9	+15	13	
4	Rapid Ulmeni	7	3	0	4	18	13	+5	9	
5	Unirea Mânăstirea	7	2	3	2	7	10	−3	9	
6	Dunărea Grădiștea	7	1	4	2	12	19	−7	7	
7	Progresul Perișoru	7	1	2	4	10	21	−11	5	
8	Conpet Ștefan Cel Mare	7	1	0	6	7	28	−21	3	

Rules for classification: 1) Points; 2) Head-to-head points; 3) Head-to-head goal difference; 4) Head-to-head goals scored; 5) Head-to-head away goals scored; 6) Goal difference; 7) Goals scored.
(C) Champions

Results

Home \ Away	VEN	ROS	DCI	RUL	UMÂ	DGR	PRP	CON
Venus Independența			3–2				4–1	5–0
Roseți	1–2		2–1		2–0		7–0	
Dunărea Ciocănești				3–1		6–1		8–1
Rapid Ulmeni	1–2	1–2			0–1			8–2
Unirea Mânăstirea	3–2		1–1			2–2	0–0	
Dunărea Grădiștea	1–1	4–4		0–3				1–0
Progresul Perișoru			0–3	3–4		3–3		
Conpet Ștefan Cel Mare		1–3			3–0		0–3	

Source: AJF Călărași
Legend: Blue = home team win; Yellow = draw; Red = away team win.

=== Cluj County ===
Someșul Dej took Voința Budeasa’s Liga III place, with only four teams participating in this short tournament, Victoria Cluj from the previous season, AMEFA Cluj and Academia Florești from Liga V Cluj, while Viitorul Cluj formed its senior team.

Pos	Team	Pld	W	D	L	GF	GA	GD	Pts	Qualification
1	Viitorul Cluj (C, Q)	7	5	1	1	46	5	+41	16	Qualification to promotion play-off
2	Victoria Cluj	7	5	1	1	42	12	+30	16	
3	Academia Florești	7	2	1	4	16	38	−22	7	
4	AMEFA Cluj	7	0	1	6	8	57	−49	1	

Rules for classification: 1) Points; 2) Head-to-head points; 3) Head-to-head goal difference; 4) Head-to-head goals scored; 5) Head-to-head away goals scored; 6) Goal difference; 7) Goals scored.
(C) Champions; (Q) Qualified for the phase indicated

Results

Home \ Away	VIC	VCL	AFF	AMF	VIC	VCL	AFF	AMF
Viitorul Cluj		3–10	10–0	15–0		3–2		
Victoria Cluj	1–0		7–3	11–1				
Academia Florești	0–5	2–9		3–3				
AMEFA Cluj	0–10	0–10	3–5				1–3	

Source: AJF Cluj
Legend: Blue = home team win; Yellow = draw; Red = away team win.

=== Constanța County ===
Gloria Albești achieved promotion to Liga III, while four teams from the previous season participated in this short tournament.

Pos	Team	Pld	W	D	L	GF	GA	GD	Pts	Qualification
1	Ovidiu	6	4	2	0	13	8	+5	14	Qualification to championship final
2	Eforie	6	2	4	0	15	9	+6	10	Qualification to championship final
3	Năvodari	6	1	2	3	11	13	−2	5	Qualification to third place match
4	Mihail Kogălniceanu	6	1	0	5	12	21	−9	3	Qualification to third place match

Rules for classification: 1) Points; 2) Head-to-head points; 3) Head-to-head goal difference; 4) Head-to-head goals scored; 5) Head-to-head away goals scored; 6) Goal difference; 7) Goals scored.

Results

Home \ Away	OVI	EFO	NĂV	MKO
Ovidiu		1–1	2–1	3–2
Eforie	1–1		3–3	4–2
Năvodari	1–2	1–1		2–3
Mihail Kogălniceanu	2–4	1–5	2–3	

Legend: Blue = home team win; Yellow = draw; Red = away team win.

Championship play-off
Third place match

Team 1	Score	Team 2
Năvodari	5–3	Mihail Kogălniceanu

Championship final

Team 1	Score	Team 2
Ovidiu	w/o	Eforie

Ovidiu won the Liga IV Constanța and qualified for the promotion play-off to Liga III.

=== Dolj County ===
Only four teams participated in this short tournament, Dunărea Calafat from the previous season, alongside Fulgerul Maglavit, Spicul Unirea from Liga V Dolj, and the newly formed Știința Calafat.

Pos	Team	Pld	W	D	L	GF	GA	GD	Pts	Qualification
1	Dunărea Calafat	6	6	0	0	21	5	+16	18	Qualification to championship final
2	Fulgerul Maglavit	6	3	0	3	23	9	+14	9	Qualification to championship final
3	Spicul Unirea	6	3	0	3	14	13	+1	9	Qualification to third place match
4	Știința Calafat	6	0	0	6	2	33	−31	0	Qualification to third place match

Rules for classification: 1) Points; 2) Head-to-head points; 3) Head-to-head goal difference; 4) Head-to-head goals scored; 5) Head-to-head away goals scored; 6) Goal difference; 7) Goals scored.

Results

Home \ Away	DUN	FUL	SPI	ȘTI
Dunărea Calafat		4–1	8–4	3–0
Fulgerul Maglavit	0–1		1–2	12–1
Spicul Unirea	0–1	1–2		5–1
Știința Calafat	0–4	0–7	0–2	

Source: AJF Dolj
Legend: Blue = home team win; Yellow = draw; Red = away team win.

Championship play-off
Third place match

Team 1	Score	Team 2
Știința Calafat	3–4	Spicul Unirea

Championship final

Team 1	Score	Team 2
Dunărea Calafat	5–1	Fulgerul Maglavit

Dunărea Calafat won the Liga IV Dolj and qualified for the promotion play-off to Liga III.

=== Giurgiu County ===
The Liga IV Giurgiu short tournament featured eight teams divided into two zones of four, with the top two from each group qualifying for the championship play-off, which consisted of semi-finals and a final. However, the competition ended after the deadline set by the Romanian Football Federation, and the Giurgiu County winner did not take part in the promotion play-off.

Zone I

Pos	Team	Pld	W	D	L	GF	GA	GD	Pts	Qualification
1	Dunărea Giurgiu (Q)	3	3	0	0	12	4	+8	9	Qualification to championship play-off
2	Spicul Izvoru (Q)	3	1	0	2	12	9	+3	3	Qualification to championship play-off
3	Viitorul Vedea	3	1	0	2	7	9	−2	3	
4	Voința Slobozia	3	1	0	2	6	15	−9	3	

Rules for classification: 1) Points; 2) Head-to-head points; 3) Head-to-head goal difference; 4) Head-to-head goals scored; 5) Head-to-head away goals scored; 6) Goal difference; 7) Goals scored.
(Q) Qualified for the phase indicated

Zone II

Pos	Team	Pld	W	D	L	GF	GA	GD	Pts	Qualification
1	Victoria Adunații-Copăceni (Q)	3	3	0	0	17	4	+13	9	Qualification to championship play-off
2	Maxima Hobaia (Q)	3	2	0	1	12	7	+5	6	Qualification to championship play-off
3	Dunărea Oinacu	3	1	0	2	4	13	−9	3	
4	Real Colibași	3	0	0	3	3	12	−9	0	

Rules for classification: 1) Points; 2) Head-to-head points; 3) Head-to-head goal difference; 4) Head-to-head goals scored; 5) Head-to-head away goals scored; 6) Goal difference; 7) Goals scored.
(Q) Qualified for the phase indicated

Championship play-off

All matches were held at Dunărea-Port Stadium in Giurgiu, with the semi-finals on 12 June 2021 and the final on 20 June 2021.

Semi-finals

Team 1	Score	Team 2
Dunărea Giurgiu	1–1 (4–5 p)	Maxima Hobaia
Victoria Adunații-Copăceni	6–1	Spicul Izvoru

Final

Team 1	Score	Team 2
Victoria Adunații-Copăceni	4–1	Maxima Hobaia

Victoria Adunații-Copăceni won the Liga IV Giurgiu.

=== Hunedoara County ===
The Liga IV Hunedoara County was played in a single round-robin regular season with ten teams, followed by a Final Four and 5–7 and 8–10 place play-offs, all contested in a single round-robin format, with teams starting with half of their regular season points, rounded up, and no other records carried over.

Team changes from the previous season

- Jiul Petroșani achieved promotion to Liga III.
- Cetate Deva II was renamed CSM Deva II.

Pos	Team	Pld	W	D	L	GF	GA	GD	Pts	Qualification
1	Aurul Brad	9	7	2	0	31	8	+23	23	Qualification to final four
2	Retezatul Hațeg	9	7	1	1	22	9	+13	22	Qualification to final four
3	Gloria Geoagiu	9	5	2	2	20	8	+12	17	Qualification to final four
4	Inter Petrila	9	5	1	3	28	12	+16	16	Qualification to final four
5	Dacia Orăștie	9	4	3	2	16	13	+3	15	Qualification to 5–7 place play-off
6	Mihai Viteazu Vulcan	9	3	2	4	14	14	0	11	Qualification to 5–7 place play-off
7	Deva II	9	2	3	4	10	12	−2	9	Qualification to 5–7 place play-off
8	Șoimul Băița	9	3	0	6	14	26	−12	9	Qualification to 8–10 place play-off
9	Minerul Uricani	9	0	2	7	6	27	−21	2	Qualification to 8–10 place play-off
10	Victoria Călan	9	0	2	7	4	36	−32	2	Qualification to 8–10 place play-off

Rules for classification: 1) Points; 2) Head-to-head points; 3) Head-to-head goal difference; 4) Head-to-head goals scored; 5) Head-to-head away goals scored; 6) Goal difference; 7) Goals scored.

Final four

The teams started the final four play-off with half of the points accumulated in the regular season.

Pos	Team	Pld	W	D	L	GF	GA	GD	Pts	Qualification
1	Aurul Brad (C, Q)	3	3	0	0	5	1	+4	21	Qualification to promotion play-off
2	Retezatul Hațeg	3	2	0	1	5	3	+2	17	
3	Gloria Geoagiu	3	1	0	2	5	7	−2	12	
4	Inter Petrila	3	0	0	3	2	6	−4	8	

Rules for classification: 1) Points; 2) Head-to-head points; 3) Head-to-head goal difference; 4) Head-to-head goals scored; 5) Head-to-head away goals scored; 6) Goal difference; 7) Goals scored.
(C) Champions; (Q) Qualified for the phase indicated

5–7 place play-off

The teams started the play-off with half of the points accumulated in the regular season.

Pos	Team	Pld	W	D	L	GF	GA	GD	Pts
5	Mihai Viteazu Vulcan	2	2	0	0	5	1	+4	12
6	Dacia Orăștie	2	0	0	2	2	4	−2	8
7	Deva II	2	1	0	1	2	4	−2	8

Rules for classification: 1) Points; 2) Head-to-head points; 3) Head-to-head goal difference; 4) Head-to-head goals scored; 5) Head-to-head away goals scored; 6) Goal difference; 7) Goals scored.

8–10 place play-off

The teams started the play-off with half of the points accumulated in the regular season.

Pos	Team	Pld	W	D	L	GF	GA	GD	Pts
8	Șoimul Băița	2	2	0	0	10	2	+8	11
9	Minerul Uricani	2	1	0	1	2	5	−3	4
10	Victoria Călan	2	0	0	2	2	7	−5	1

Rules for classification: 1) Points; 2) Head-to-head points; 3) Head-to-head goal difference; 4) Head-to-head goals scored; 5) Head-to-head away goals scored; 6) Goal difference; 7) Goals scored.

=== Ialomița County ===
Only five teams from the previous season participated in this short tournament, played over two legs (home and away).

Pos	Team	Pld	W	D	L	GF	GA	GD	Pts	Qualification
1	Fetești (C, Q)	8	7	0	1	23	9	+14	21	Qualification to promotion play-off
2	Victoria Țăndărei	8	4	0	4	17	20	−3	12	
3	Victoria Munteni-Buzău	8	4	0	4	20	24	−4	12	
4	Bărăganul Ciulnița	8	3	0	5	23	24	−1	9	
5	Abatorul Slobozia	8	2	0	6	17	23	−6	6	

Rules for classification: 1) Points; 2) Head-to-head points; 3) Head-to-head goal difference; 4) Head-to-head goals scored; 5) Head-to-head away goals scored; 6) Goal difference; 7) Goals scored.
(C) Champions; (Q) Qualified for the phase indicated

Results

Home \ Away	FET	VȚĂ	VMB	BĂR	ASL
Fetești		5–1	1–0	5–3	2–1
Victoria Țăndărei	1–5		4–2	1–2	1–0
Victoria Munteni-Buzău	2–0	2–1		6–4	5–3
Bărăganul Ciulnița	0–1	3–5	6–0		1–3
Abatorul Slobozia	1–4	1–3	5–3	3–4	

Source: AJF Ialomița
Legend: Blue = home team win; Yellow = draw; Red = away team win.

=== Ilfov County ===
Only four teams participated in this short tournament, three from the previous season and Voința Crevedia, the Liga V Ilfov leader at the moment of the interruption in March 2020.

Pos	Team	Pld	W	D	L	GF	GA	GD	Pts	Qualification
1	Viitorul Domnești (Q)	6	6	0	0	33	5	+28	18	Qualification to championship final
2	Voința Crevedia (Q)	6	4	0	2	24	12	+12	12	Qualification to championship final
3	Brănești	5	1	0	4	9	26	−17	3	
4	Măgurele	5	0	0	5	7	30	−23	0	

Rules for classification: 1) Points; 2) Head-to-head points; 3) Head-to-head goal difference; 4) Head-to-head goals scored; 5) Head-to-head away goals scored; 6) Goal difference; 7) Goals scored.
(Q) Qualified for the phase indicated

Results

Home \ Away	VDM	VCR	BRĂ	MĂG
Viitorul Domnești		2–1	7–0	5–2
Voința Crevedia	1–4		5–2	8–0
Brănești	0–7	3–4		~~7 April~~
Măgurele	1–8	1–5	3–4	

Source: AJF Ilfov
Legend: Blue = home team win; Yellow = draw; Red = away team win.

Championship final

The championship final was played between the leader and the runner-up of the regular season. If the match ended in a draw, the higher-seeded team was declared the winner.

Team 1	Score	Team 2
Viitorul Domnești	5–0	Voința Crevedia

Viitorul Domnești won the Liga IV Ilfov and qualified for the promotion play-off to Liga III.

=== Maramureș County ===
Progresul Șomcuta Mare achieved promotion to Liga III, while only four teams from the previous season announced that they could comply with the conditions imposed by the medical protocol.

Pos	Team	Pld	W	D	L	GF	GA	GD	Pts	Qualification
1	Sighetu Marmației	6	4	1	1	17	6	+11	13	Qualification to championship final
2	Lăpușul Târgu Lăpuș	6	3	1	2	18	7	+11	10	Qualification to championship final
3	Avântul Bârsana	6	3	1	2	12	14	−2	10	
4	Salina Ocna Șugatag	6	0	1	5	6	26	−20	1	

Rules for classification: 1) Points; 2) Head-to-head points; 3) Head-to-head goal difference; 4) Head-to-head goals scored; 5) Head-to-head away goals scored; 6) Goal difference; 7) Goals scored.

Results

Home \ Away	SIG	LĂP	BÂR	SAL
Sighetu Marmației		1–1	1–3	6–2
Lăpușul Târgu Lăpuș	0–2		4–1	7–1
Avântul Bârsana	0–5	2–1		1–1
Salina Ocna Șugatag	0–2	0–5	2–5	

Source: AJF Maramureș
Legend: Blue = home team win; Yellow = draw; Red = away team win.

Championship final

The match took place on 28 April 2021 at Municipal Stadium in Sighetu Marmației.

Team 1	Score	Team 2
Sighetu Marmației	3–0	Lăpușul Târgu Lăpuș

Sighetu Marmației won the Liga IV Maramureș and qualified for the promotion play-off to Liga III.

=== Mehedinți County ===
Only two teams from the previous season, Viitorul Șimian and Pandurii Cerneți, along with two from Liga V Mehedinți, AS Noapteșa and Avântul Bistrița, announced that they could comply with the conditions imposed by the medical protocol.

Pos	Team	Pld	W	D	L	GF	GA	GD	Pts	Qualification
1	Pandurii Cerneți	6	5	1	0	24	9	+15	16	Qualification to championship final
2	Viitorul Șimian	6	4	1	1	35	9	+26	13	Qualification to championship final
3	Noapteșa	6	1	0	5	14	34	−20	3	Qualification to third place match
4	Avântul Bistrița	6	1	0	5	16	37	−21	3	Qualification to third place match

Rules for classification: 1) Points; 2) Head-to-head points; 3) Head-to-head goal difference; 4) Head-to-head goals scored; 5) Head-to-head away goals scored; 6) Goal difference; 7) Goals scored.

Results

Home \ Away	PCE	ȘIM	NOA	AVB
Pandurii Cerneți		2–1	3–0	5–2
Viitorul Șimian	2–2		6–1	8–1
Noapteșa	2–4	3–10		6–3
Avântul Bistrița	2–8	0–8	8–2	

Source: AJF Mehedinți
Legend: Blue = home team win; Yellow = draw; Red = away team win.

Championship play-off
Third place match

Team 1	Score	Team 2
Noapteșa	5–0	Avântul Bistrița

Championship final

Team 1	Score	Team 2
Viitorul Șimian	4–0	Pandurii Cerneți

Viitorul Șimian won the Liga IV Mehedinți and qualified for the promotion play-off to Liga III.

=== Mureș County ===
Unirea Ungheni achieved promotion to Liga III, while only twelve teams, eight from the previous season and four new sides, Kinder Sângeorgiu de Mureș, Înfrățirea Valea Izvoarelor, MSE 1898 Târgu Mureș and Viitorul Târnăveni, announced that they could comply with the conditions imposed by the medical protocol.

Series I

Pos	Team	Pld	W	D	L	GF	GA	GD	Pts	Qualification
1	Iernut (Q)	5	5	0	0	17	7	+10	15	Qualification to championship play-off
2	Kinder Sângeorgiu de Mureș (Q)	5	3	0	2	16	9	+7	9	Qualification to championship play-off
3	Inter Sânger	5	3	0	2	13	9	+4	9	
4	Mureșul Chirileu	5	2	0	3	9	16	−7	6	
5	Mureșul Luduș	5	1	1	3	8	10	−2	4	
6	Înfrățirea Valea Izvoarelor	5	0	1	4	10	22	−12	1	

Rules for classification: 1) Points; 2) Head-to-head points; 3) Head-to-head goal difference; 4) Head-to-head goals scored; 5) Head-to-head away goals scored; 6) Goal difference; 7) Goals scored.
(Q) Qualified for the phase indicated

Results

Home \ Away	IER	KIN	SÂN	CHI	LUD	ÎNF
Iernut		3–0	4–1	3–2		
Kinder Sângeorgiu de Mureș					3–2	6–0
Inter Sânger		4–3				3–1
Mureșul Chirileu		0–4	0–5		3–2	
Mureșul Luduș	0–1		1–0			
Înfrățirea Valea Izvoarelor	4–6			2–4	3–3	

Source: AJF Mureș
Legend: Blue = home team win; Yellow = draw; Red = away team win.

Series II

Pos	Team	Pld	W	D	L	GF	GA	GD	Pts	Qualification
1	MSE 1898 Târgu Mureș (Q)	5	4	1	0	29	7	+22	13	Qualification to championship play-off
2	Mureșul Rușii-Munți (Q)	5	4	1	0	16	4	+12	13	Qualification to championship play-off
3	Sighișoara	5	3	0	2	13	9	+4	9	
4	Târnava Mică Sângeorgiu de Pădure	5	2	0	3	12	15	−3	6	
5	Viitorul Târnăveni	5	1	0	4	4	25	−21	3	
6	Atletic Târgu Mureș	5	0	0	5	3	17	−14	0	

Rules for classification: 1) Points; 2) Head-to-head points; 3) Head-to-head goal difference; 4) Head-to-head goals scored; 5) Head-to-head away goals scored; 6) Goal difference; 7) Goals scored.
(Q) Qualified for the phase indicated

Results

Home \ Away	MSE	MRM	SIG	SGP	VTV	ATL
MSE 1898 Târgu Mureș			3–0	8–0	10–1	5–3
Mureșul Rușii-Munți	3–3		5–1			
Sighișoara				5–1	4–0	
Târnava Mică Sângeorgiu de Pădure		0–2			8–0	3–0
Viitorul Târnăveni		0–3				
Atletic Târgu Mureș		0–3	0–3		0–3	

Source: AJF Mureș
Legend: Blue = home team win; Yellow = draw; Red = away team win.

Championship play-off
Semi-finals

The semi-final matches were played on 5 May 2021 at neutral venues, Central Stadium in Sovata and the Weekend Sports Complex in Târgu Mureș.

Team 1	Score	Team 2
MSE 1898 Târgu Mureș	1–2	Kinder Sângeorgiu de Mureș
Iernut	3–1	Mureșul Rușii-Munți

Final

The match took place on 8 May 2021 at Central Stadium in Gornești.

Team 1	Score	Team 2
Kinder Sângeorgiu de Mureș	2–3	Iernut

Iernut won the Liga IV Mureș County and qualified for the promotion play-off to Liga III.

=== Prahova County ===
CSO Plopeni achieved promotion to Liga III, while only four teams from the previous season announced that they could comply with the conditions imposed by the medical protocol.

Pos	Team	Pld	W	D	L	GF	GA	GD	Pts	Qualification
1	Petrolul 95 Ploiești	6	4	1	1	13	5	+8	13	Qualification to championship final
2	Petrolul Băicoi	6	2	2	2	10	9	+1	8	Qualification to championship final
3	Tricolorul Breaza	6	2	2	2	10	12	−2	8	
4	Bănești-Urleta	6	0	3	3	8	15	−7	3	

Rules for classification: 1) Points; 2) Head-to-head points; 3) Head-to-head goal difference; 4) Head-to-head goals scored; 5) Head-to-head away goals scored; 6) Goal difference; 7) Goals scored.

Results

Home \ Away	P95	PBĂ	TRI	BĂN
Petrolul 95 Ploiești		3–1	2–3	2–1
Petrolul Băicoi	0–0		4–1	1–0
Tricolorul Breaza	0–1	2–1		2–2
Bănești-Urleta	0–5	3–3	2–2	

Source: AJF Prahova
Legend: Blue = home team win; Yellow = draw; Red = away team win.

Championship final

The championship final was played between the leader and the runner-up of the regular season. If the match ended in a draw, the higher-seeded team was declared the winner.

Team 1	Score	Team 2
Petrolul 95 Ploiești	6–0	Petrolul Băicoi

Petrolul 95 Ploiești won the Liga IV Prahova County and qualified for the promotion play-off to Liga III.

=== Satu Mare County ===
CSM Satu Mare achieved promotion to Liga III, while only twelve teams from the previous season announced that they could comply with the conditions imposed by the medical protocol.

Series A

Pos	Team	Pld	W	D	L	GF	GA	GD	Pts	Qualification
1	Recolta Dorolț (Q)	5	3	2	0	8	4	+4	11	Qualification to championship play-off
2	Olimpia MCMXXI Satu Mare (Q)	5	3	1	1	12	5	+7	10	Qualification to championship play-off
3	Unirea Păulești	5	3	0	2	11	3	+8	9	
4	Știința Beltiug	5	1	2	2	6	9	−3	5	
5	Talna Orașu Nou	5	1	1	3	10	9	+1	4	
6	Energia Negrești-Oaș	5	1	0	4	6	23	−17	3	

Rules for classification: 1) Points; 2) Head-to-head points; 3) Head-to-head goal difference; 4) Head-to-head goals scored; 5) Head-to-head away goals scored; 6) Goal difference; 7) Goals scored.
(Q) Qualified for the phase indicated

Results

Home \ Away	RDO	OLI	UPL	ȘTI	TAL	ENO
Recolta Dorolț				2–2	2–0	
Olimpia MCMXXI Satu Mare	0–0				3–1	5–1
Unirea Păulești	0–1	0–2				7–0
Știința Beltiug		3–2	0–2			
Talna Orașu Nou			0–2	1–1		8–1
Energia Negrești-Oaș	2–3			2–0		

Legend: Blue = home team win; Yellow = draw; Red = away team win.

Series B

Pos	Team	Pld	W	D	L	GF	GA	GD	Pts	Qualification
1	Victoria Carei (Q)	5	4	0	1	13	7	+6	12	Qualification to championship play-off
2	Viitorul Vetiș	5	3	1	1	25	13	+12	10	Ineligible for promotion
3	Unirea Tășnad (Q)	5	2	2	1	9	6	+3	8	Qualification to championship play-off
4	Turul Micula	5	2	1	2	12	11	+1	7	
5	Crasna Moftinu Mic	5	1	1	3	5	11	−6	4	
6	Recolta Sanislău	5	0	1	4	3	19	−16	1	

Rules for classification: 1) Points; 2) Head-to-head points; 3) Head-to-head goal difference; 4) Head-to-head goals scored; 5) Head-to-head away goals scored; 6) Goal difference; 7) Goals scored.
(Q) Qualified for the phase indicated

Results

Home \ Away	VIC	VVT	UNI	TUR	CRA	RSA
Victoria Carei		5–1			3–0	
Viitorul Vetiș				7–2		10–1
Unirea Tășnad	1–2	3–3		2–1		
Turul Micula	5–1				0–0	4–1
Crasna Moftinu Mic		2–4	0–3			
Recolta Sanislău	0–2		0–0		1–3	

Legend: Blue = home team win; Yellow = draw; Red = away team win.

Championship play-off
Semi-finals

The matches were played on 4 May 2021 at neutral venues, Comunal Stadium in Dorolț and Daniel Prodan Stadium in Satu Mare.

Team 1	Score	Team 2
Victoria Carei	2–2 (6–5 p)	Olimpia MCMXXI Satu Mare
Unirea Tășnad	3–3 (15–14 p)	Recolta Dorolț

Final

The match was played on 7 May 2021 at Daniel Prodan Stadium in Satu Mare.

Team 1	Score	Team 2
Victoria Carei	4–1	Unirea Tășnad

Victoria Carei won the Liga IV Satu Mare County and qualified for the promotion play-off to Liga III.

=== Sălaj County ===
Sportul Șimleu Silvaniei achieved promotion to Liga III, while only three teams from the previous season and one from Liga V Sălaj, Juniorii Ip, announced that they could comply with the conditions imposed by the medical protocol.

Pos	Team	Pld	W	D	L	GF	GA	GD	Pts	Qualification
1	Rapid Jibou	7	6	0	1	30	6	+24	18	Qualification to championship final
2	Chieșd	7	3	1	3	14	20	−6	10	Qualification to championship final
3	Juniorii Ip	6	2	2	2	12	18	−6	8	
4	Someșul Someș-Odorhei	6	0	1	5	7	19	−12	1	

Rules for classification: 1) Points; 2) Head-to-head points; 3) Head-to-head goal difference; 4) Head-to-head goals scored; 5) Head-to-head away goals scored; 6) Goal difference; 7) Goals scored.

Results

Home \ Away	JIB	CHI	JIP	SOM
Rapid Jibou		6–1	8–0	1–0
Chieșd	0–3		3–3	2–0
Juniorii Ip	2–1	1–2		4–2
Someșul Someș-Odorhei	1–6	2–4	2–2	

Source: AJF Sălaj
Legend: Blue = home team win; Yellow = draw; Red = away team win.

Championship final

The championship final was played between the leader and the runner-up of the regular season. If the match ended in a draw, the higher-seeded team was declared the winner.

Team 1	Score	Team 2
Rapid Jibou	5–2	Chieșd

Rapid Jibou won the Liga IV Sălaj County and qualified for the promotion play-off to Liga III.

=== Sibiu County ===
Măgura Cisnădie achieved promotion to Liga III, while only five teams, one from the previous season, FC Avrig, and the four new entries, Alma Sibiu, Inter Sibiu, Interstar Sibiu, and Quantum/Cuantic Arsenal Sibiu, announced that they could comply with the conditions imposed by the medical protocol.

Pos	Team	Pld	W	D	L	GF	GA	GD	Pts	Qualification
1	Avrig (C, Q)	8	7	1	0	26	4	+22	22	Qualification to promotion play-off
2	Inter Sibiu	8	5	2	1	33	11	+22	17	
3	Quantum/Cuantic Arsenal Sibiu	8	2	2	4	12	22	−10	8	
4	Alma Sibiu	8	2	1	5	7	17	−10	7	
5	Interstar Sibiu	8	0	2	6	6	30	−24	2	

Rules for classification: 1) Points; 2) Head-to-head points; 3) Head-to-head goal difference; 4) Head-to-head goals scored; 5) Head-to-head away goals scored; 6) Goal difference; 7) Goals scored.
(C) Champions; (Q) Qualified for the phase indicated

Results

Home \ Away	AVR	INT	ARS	ALM	ISS
Avrig		5–2	3–0	3–0	5–1
Inter Sibiu	1–1		8–1	3–0	9–0
Quantum/Cuantic Arsenal Sibiu	0–3	2–2		1–3	3–3
Alma Sibiu	0–3	1–3	0–3		1–1
Interstar Sibiu	0–3	1–5	0–2	0–2	

Source: AJF Sibiu
Legend: Blue = home team win; Yellow = draw; Red = away team win.

=== Suceava County ===
Eight teams from the previous season announced that they could comply with the conditions imposed by the medical protocol.

Group A

Pos	Team	Pld	W	D	L	GF	GA	GD	Pts	Qualification
1	Viitorul Liteni (Q)	6	5	1	0	16	3	+13	16	Qualification to championship final
2	Juniorul Suceava	6	4	1	1	17	5	+12	13	
3	Progresul Frătăuții Vechi	6	2	0	4	8	16	−8	6	
4	Siretul Dolhasca	6	0	0	6	1	18	−17	0	

Rules for classification: 1) Points; 2) Head-to-head points; 3) Head-to-head goal difference; 4) Head-to-head goals scored; 5) Head-to-head away goals scored; 6) Goal difference; 7) Goals scored.
(Q) Qualified for the phase indicated

Results

Home \ Away	LIT	JUN	PFV	DOL
Viitorul Liteni		4–0	3–1	3–0
Juniorul Suceava	1–1		6–0	3–0
Progresul Frătăuții Vechi	1–2	0–4		3–1
Siretul Dolhasca	0–3	0–3	0–3	

Legend: Blue = home team win; Yellow = draw; Red = away team win.

Group B

Pos	Team	Pld	W	D	L	GF	GA	GD	Pts	Qualification
1	LPS Suceava (Q)	6	4	2	0	21	4	+17	14	Qualification to championship final
2	Moldova Drăgușeni	6	4	1	1	17	6	+11	13	
3	Zimbrul Siret	6	2	1	3	6	9	−3	7	
4	Recolta Fântânele	6	0	0	6	3	28	−25	0	

Rules for classification: 1) Points; 2) Head-to-head points; 3) Head-to-head goal difference; 4) Head-to-head goals scored; 5) Head-to-head away goals scored; 6) Goal difference; 7) Goals scored.
(Q) Qualified for the phase indicated

Results

Home \ Away	LPS	DRĂ	SIR	FÂN
LPS Suceava		2–2	0–0	9–0
Moldova Drăgușeni	2–3		4–0	5–0
Zimbrul Siret	0–1	0–2		3–0
Recolta Fântânele	0–6	1–2	2–3	

Legend: Blue = home team win; Yellow = draw; Red = away team win.

Championship final

Team 1	Score	Team 2
Viitorul Liteni	1–0	LPS Suceava

Viitorul Liteni won the Liga IV Suceava County and qualified for the promotion play-off to Liga III.

=== Teleorman County ===
Only four teams from the previous season announced that they could comply with the conditions imposed by the medical protocol.

Pos	Team	Pld	W	D	L	GF	GA	GD	Pts	Qualification
1	Rapid Buzescu	6	4	2	0	20	6	+14	14	Qualification to championship final
2	Ajax Botoroaga	6	4	1	1	21	6	+15	13	Qualification to championship final
3	Alexandria II	6	2	1	3	15	15	0	7	
4	Viitorul Butești	6	0	0	6	6	35	−29	0	

Rules for classification: 1) Points; 2) Head-to-head points; 3) Head-to-head goal difference; 4) Head-to-head goals scored; 5) Head-to-head away goals scored; 6) Goal difference; 7) Goals scored.

Results

Home \ Away	RBZ	AJX	AL2	VBT
Rapid Buzescu		2–1	6–0	8–3
Ajax Botoroaga	1–1		7–0	5–0
Alexandria II	0–0	1–2		8–0
Viitorul Butești	1–3	2–5	0–6	

Source: AJF Teleorman
Legend: Blue = home team win; Yellow = draw; Red = away team win.

Championship final

The championship final was played between the leader and the runner-up of the regular season. If the match ended in a draw, the higher-seeded team was declared the winner.

Team 1	Score	Team 2
Rapid Buzescu	2–2	Ajax Botoroaga

Rapid Buzescu won the Liga IV Teleorman County and qualified for the promotion play-off to Liga III.

=== Timiș County ===
Avântul Periam achieved promotion to Liga III, while only seven teams from the previous season and two promoted sides from Liga V Timiș, CS Comloșu Mare (Series I winners) and Avântul Topolovățu Mare (Series III winners), participated in this short tournament.

Pos	Team	Pld	W	D	L	GF	GA	GD	Pts	Qualification
1	Pobeda Stár Bišnov (C, Q)	8	7	0	1	13	5	+8	21	Qualification to promotion play-off
2	Peciu Nou	8	6	1	1	22	9	+13	19	
3	Phoenix Buziaș	8	5	1	2	17	11	+6	16	
4	Comloșu Mare	8	5	0	3	15	10	+5	15	
5	UVT Timișoara	8	3	1	4	17	11	+6	10	
6	Unirea Sânnicolau Mare	8	3	1	4	15	19	−4	10	
7	Timișul Șag	8	2	2	4	10	11	−1	8	
8	Avântul Topolovățu Mare	8	1	1	6	11	27	−16	4	
9	Dudeștii Noi	8	0	1	7	5	22	−17	1	

Rules for classification: 1) Points; 2) Head-to-head points; 3) Head-to-head goal difference; 4) Head-to-head goals scored; 5) Head-to-head away goals scored; 6) Goal difference; 7) Goals scored.
(C) Champions; (Q) Qualified for the phase indicated

Results

Home \ Away	POB	PEC	PHO	COM	UVT	SÂN	ȘAG	TOP	DUD
Pobeda Stár Bišnov			1–0	0–1		2–1	2–1		
Peciu Nou	0–1			1–0		8–1	2–1		
Phoenix Buziaș		3–3			3–2			3–0	3–1
Comloșu Mare			1–2			1–3		6–2	2–0
UVT Timișoara	0–1	2–3		0–1			1–1		
Unirea Sânnicolau Mare			1–3		0–4			5–0	3–0
Timișul Șag			2–0	2–3		1–1			1–0
Avântul Topolovățu Mare	2–3	0–2			2–4		2–1		
Dudeștii Noi	0–3	1–3			0–4			3–3	

Source: AJF Timiș
Legend: Blue = home team win; Yellow = draw; Red = away team win.

=== Vaslui County ===
Sporting Juniorul Vaslui was admitted to Liga III to fill the vacant places, while only five teams from the previous season announced that they could comply with the conditions imposed by the medical protocol.

Pos	Team	Pld	W	D	L	GF	GA	GD	Pts	Qualification (Note: The team ranked last after 4 rounds were eliminated.)
1	Vaslui (C, Q)	7	5	2	0	27	5	+22	17	Qualification to promotion play-off
2	Rapid Brodoc	7	4	3	0	23	6	+17	15	
3	Gârceni	7	3	1	3	19	15	+4	10	
4	Vulturești	7	1	0	6	10	33	−23	3	
5	Viitorul Vetrișoaia (E)	4	0	0	4	5	25	−20	0	Eliminated

Rules for classification: 1) Points; 2) Head-to-head points; 3) Head-to-head goal difference; 4) Head-to-head goals scored; 5) Head-to-head away goals scored; 6) Goal difference; 7) Goals scored.
(C) Champions; (E) Eliminated; (Q) Qualified for the phase indicated
Notes:

Results

Home \ Away	VAS	RAP	GÂR	VUL	VET
Vaslui		1–1	1–0	12–1	7–1
Rapid Brodoc	1–1		3–1	6–1	6–0
Gârceni	0–2	2–2		3–1	
Vulturești	1–3	0–4	3–4		
Viitorul Vetrișoaia			3–9	1–3	

Source: AJF Vaslui
Legend: Blue = home team win; Yellow = draw; Red = away team win.

=== Vâlcea County ===
Minerul Costești was admitted to Liga III to fill the vacant places, while only three teams from the previous season and one from Liga V Vâlcea, CS Mădulari, announced that they could not comply with the conditions imposed by the medical protocol.

Pos	Team	Pld	W	D	L	GF	GA	GD	Pts	Qualification
1	Băbeni	6	4	2	0	12	5	+7	14	Qualification to championship final
2	Păușești Otăsău	6	3	1	2	15	9	+6	10	Qualification to championship final
3	Mădulari	6	3	1	2	11	10	+1	10	
4	Chimia 1973 Râmnicu Vâlcea	6	0	0	6	5	19	−14	0	

Rules for classification: 1) Points; 2) Head-to-head points; 3) Head-to-head goal difference; 4) Head-to-head goals scored; 5) Head-to-head away goals scored; 6) Goal difference; 7) Goals scored.

Results

Home \ Away	BĂB	PĂU	MĂD	CHI
Băbeni		3–1	2–1	2–0
Păușești Otăsău	1–1		4–1	6–2
Mădulari	1–1	2–1		4–2
Chimia 1973 Râmnicu Vâlcea	1–3	0–2	0–2	

Source: AJF Vâlcea
Legend: Blue = home team win; Yellow = draw; Red = away team win.

Championship final

The championship final was played between the leader and the runner-up of the regular season. If the match ended in a draw, the higher-seeded team was declared the winner.

Team 1	Score	Team 2
Băbeni	2–1	Păușești Otăsău

Băbeni won the Liga IV Vâlcea County and qualified for the promotion play-off to Liga III.

=== Vrancea County ===
Only four teams from the previous season, along with two new teams, Inizio Focșani and Prosport Focșani, announced that they could not comply with the conditions imposed by the medical protocol. However, the competition ended after the deadline set by the FRF, and the Vrancea County winner did not participate in the promotion play-off.

Pos	Team	Pld	W	D	L	GF	GA	GD	Pts	Qualification
1	Dumbrăveni	5	4	1	0	17	8	+9	13	Qualification to championship final
2	Inizio Focșani	5	3	1	1	12	3	+9	10	Qualification to championship final
3	Siretul Suraia	5	2	2	1	9	9	0	8	Qualification to third place match
4	Panciu	5	2	1	2	21	11	+10	7	Qualification to third place match
5	Tractorul Nănești	5	1	1	3	14	13	+1	4	
6	Prosport Focșani	5	0	0	5	4	33	−29	0	

Rules for classification: 1) Points; 2) Head-to-head points; 3) Head-to-head goal difference; 4) Head-to-head goals scored; 5) Head-to-head away goals scored; 6) Goal difference; 7) Goals scored.

Results

Home \ Away	DBV	INF	SSU	PAN	TRN	PRF
Dumbrăveni		2–1		3–3	2–1	
Inizio Focșani				3–0		6–0
Siretul Suraia	1–5	1–1		2–1		3–0
Panciu					7–2	10–1
Tractorul Nănești		0–1	2–2			9–1
Prosport Focșani	2–5					

Source: AJF Vrancea
Legend: Blue = home team win; Yellow = draw; Red = away team win.

Championship play-off
Third place match

The match for third place was played on 13 June 2021 at the Măgura Stadium in Jariștea.

Team 1	Score	Team 2
Siretul Suraia	5–3	Panciu

Championship final

The championship final was played on 13 June 2021 at the Comunal Stadium in Gugești.

Team 1	Score	Team 2
Dumbrăveni	2–3	Inizio Focșani

Inizio Focșani won the Liga IV Vrancea County.

== See also ==
- 2020–21 Liga I
- 2020–21 Liga II
- 2020–21 Liga III
- 2020–21 Cupa României
