= 2020–21 Liga III =

Third tier Romanian football league

Liga III
- Season: 2020–21
- Promoted: Dacia Unirea Brăila; Steaua București; Corona Brașov; Viitorul Șelimbăr; Unirea Dej
- Relegated: Bradu Borca; Făurei; Balotești; Universitatea Craiova II; Hermannstadt II; Minerul Costești; Fortuna Becicherecu Mic; Industria Galda

The 2020–21 Liga III was the 65th season of Liga III, the third tier of the Romanian football league system. The season began in September 2020 and ended in May 2021.

The format was changed from five series of 16 teams to ten series of 10 teams, following the suspension of relegation in the previous season due to the COVID-19 pandemic. Each series was played in a double round-robin format. At the end of the regular season, a promotion play-off system was introduced in two rounds, in which the top two teams from each series qualified and competed in paired groups (1–2, 3–4, 5–6, 7–8, 9–10) to determine the five teams promoted to Liga II. The bottom two teams from each series, together with the lowest-ranked eighth-placed team overall, qualified for promotion/relegation play-offs against the winners of the Liga IV county championships that were partially held.

== Team changes ==
Promoted to Liga II

- Aerostar Bacău – ended a one-year stay.
- FCU 1948 Craiova – ended a two-year stay.
- Unirea Slobozia – ended a five-year stay.
- Slatina – ended a one-year stay.
- Comuna Recea – ended a five-year stay.

Relegated from Liga II

- Sportul Snagov and Daco-Getica București were dissolved during the winter break of the previous season and excluded by the Romanian Football Federation before the start of the new season.

Promoted from Liga IV

- Bradu Borca – debut.
- Dante Botoșani – debut.
- Satu Mare – debut.
- Progresul Șomcuta Mare – after eighteen years of absence.
- Unirea Ungheni – after eight years of absence.
- Corona Brașov – after eight years of absence.
- Progresul Ezeriș – debut.
- Avântul Periam – debut.
- Petrolul Potcoava – debut.
- Oltenița – after one year of absence.
- Steaua București – debut.
- Sportul Chiscani – after one year of absence.
- Gloria Albești – debut.
- Plopeni – after eight years of absence.
- Avântul Valea Mărului – after two years of absence.
- Râmnicu Sărat – after one year of absence.
- Ocna Mureș – after one year of absence.
- Măgura Cisnădie– after four years of absence.
- Sportul Șimleu Silvaniei– after eleven years of absence.

Relegated to Liga IV

- Botoșani II – ended a two-year stay.
- CSU Galați – ended a one-year stay.
- Poseidon Limanu-2 Mai – ended a one-year stay.
- Medgidia – ended a two-year stay.
- Tractorul Cetate – ended a one-year stay.
- Național Sebiș – ended a twelve-year stay.
- CFR Cluj II – ended a three-year stay.

Other changes

- The promoted side Voința Budeasa and Bărăganul Ciulnița withdrew.
- Minerul Costești, Sporting Juniorul Vaslui, CA Oradea, Sepsi OSK Sfântu Gheorghe II and Someșul Dej made their debut, while Jiul Petroșani returned after eight years of absence, all being admitted to Liga III to fill vacant places after failing to secure promotion in the previous season.
- Viitorul Constanța II, Dinamo București II, Rapid București II, Concordia Chiajna II, Academica Clinceni II, Gaz Metan Mediaș II, Hermannstadt II and Kids Tâmpa Brașov were enrolled in Liga III upon request.
- Hușana Huși, Bacău, Pașcani, Axiopolis Cernavodă, Dacia Unirea Brăila, FCSB II, Recolta Gheorghe Doja, Pucioasa, Astra II, Balotești, Sporting Roșiori, Cetate Deva, Filiași, Poli Timișoara, Gilortul Târgu Cărbunești, Unirea Alba Iulia, Industria Galda, Odorheiu Secuiesc and Zalău were spared from relegation due to the interruption of the 2019–20 season, as a result of the COVID-19 pandemic.
- Cetate Deva was renamed CSM Deva.
- Metalurgistul Cugir was renamed CSO Cugir.

== League tables ==
=== Seria I ===
Pos	Team	Pld	W	D	L	GF	GA	GD	Pts	Promotion or relegation	BUC	FOR	CEA	MIR	HUȘ	DNT	ȘOM	SVS	BRA	PAȘ
1	Bucovina Rădăuți (C, Q)	18	12	3	3	36	15	+21	39	Qualification to promotion play-off		1–1	1–0	2–0	1–0	1–1	2–2	2–0	2–0	6–0
2	Foresta Suceava (Q)	18	11	3	4	31	10	+21	36	Qualification to promotion play-off	3–0		0–1	1–2	3–0	4–0	1–0	4–0	2–0	4–0
3	Ceahlăul Piatra Neamț	18	11	1	6	30	19	+11	34		1–2	0–1		1–0	3–0	2–1	3–0	0–3	4–1	5–0
4	Știința Miroslava	18	10	3	5	41	20	+21	33		2–1	0–1	4–0		2–3	3–3	2–2	4–1	3–0	4–0
5	Hușana Huși	18	9	2	7	24	19	+5	29		1–2	0–0	3–1	0–2		1–0	1–1	0–1	5–0	3–0
6	Dante Botoșani	18	8	2	8	26	27	−1	26		1–3	2–0	0–3	1–3	0–2		2–0	2–1	2–0	4–0
7	Șomuz Fălticeni	18	7	4	7	23	21	+2	25		1–2	3–2	0–1	3–0	1–2	0–1		1–0	3–1	2–1
8	Sporting Juniorul Vaslui	18	6	2	10	21	28	−7	20		2–1	0–1	2–3	0–6	0–1	1–2	0–0		1–1	3–0
9	Bradu Borca (R)	18	2	3	13	12	41	−29	9	Qualification to relegation play-out	0–3	1–3	1–1	0–3	0–1	3–1	0–2	0–2		2–1
10	Pașcani (O)	18	1	3	14	7	51	−44	6	Qualification to relegation play-out	0–4	0–0	0–1	1–1	2–1	0–3	0–2	0–4	2–2	

Source: FRF (in Romanian), Soccerway
Legend: Blue = home team win; Yellow = draw; Red = away team win.
Rules for classification: 1) Points; 2) Head-to-head points; 3) Head-to-head goal difference; 4) Head-to-head goals scored; 5) Head-to-head away goals scored; 6) Goal difference; 7) Goals scored.
(C) Champions; (O) Play-off winners; (Q) Qualified for the phase indicated; (R) Relegated

=== Seria II ===
Pos	Team	Pld	W	D	L	GF	GA	GD	Pts	Promotion or relegation	OȚE	DUB	FOC	RMS	VIA	LIE	CSM	AVM	SPO	FĂU
1	Oțelul Galați (C, Q)	18	13	2	3	54	13	+41	41	Qualification to promotion play-off		1–2	1–1	3–1	3–1	1–0	4–0	2–0	7–0	11–0
2	Dacia Unirea Brăila (Q)	18	12	2	4	56	19	+37	38	Qualification to promotion play-off	3–2		1–3	2–2	1–2	4–0	1–1	4–0	8–1	5–1
3	Focșani	18	10	6	2	41	19	+22	36		1–1	2–4		2–2	4–1	3–2	1–1	0–1	6–0	4–1
4	Râmnicu Sărat	18	10	3	5	29	23	+6	33		1–0	2–1	0–2		1–2	3–1	3–0	2–0	2–1	3–1
5	Viitorul Ianca	18	8	5	5	40	24	+16	29		0–1	0–4	0–1	1–1		4–2	2–0	5–2	11–0	6–1
6	Sporting Liești	18	8	3	7	31	27	+4	27		0–2	2–1	1–2	5–0	1–1		2–0	1–0	3–0	2–2
7	Bacău	18	5	4	9	16	29	−13	19		1–3	0–3	2–2	1–2	0–2	0–0		2–1	1–0	3–0
8	Avântul Valea Mărului (Note: Avântul Valea Mărului qualified for the relegation play-out as the worst ranked 8th place from all the 10 series.) (O)	18	4	1	13	12	33	−21	13	Qualification to relegation play-out	0–6	0–3	0–2	0–1	0–0	1–2	2–0		0–1	2–0
9	Sportul Chiscani (O)	18	2	2	14	9	66	−57	8 (Note: Sportul Chiscani–Făurei 1–1; Făurei–Sportul Chiscani 0–1)	Qualification to relegation play-out	0–3	0–6	0–4	0–3	1–1	2–5	1–3	0–2		1–1
10	Făurei (Note: Făurei were deducted 2 points) (R)	18	2	4	12	15	50	−35	8	Qualification to relegation play-out	2–3	0–3	1–1	1–0	1–1	1–2	0–1	2–1	0–1	

Source: FRF (in Romanian), Soccerway
Legend: Blue = home team win; Yellow = draw; Red = away team win.
Rules for classification: 1) Points; 2) Head-to-head points; 3) Head-to-head goal difference; 4) Head-to-head goals scored; 5) Head-to-head away goals scored; 6) Goal difference; 7) Goals scored.
(C) Champions; (O) Play-off winners; (Q) Qualified for the phase indicated; (R) Relegated

=== Seria III ===
Pos	Team	Pld	W	D	L	GF	GA	GD	Pts	Promotion or relegation	AFU	MOS	POP	AXI	FCV	AGR	MOD	GLA	RGD	OLT
1	Afumați (C, Q)	18	14	3	1	44	10	+34	45	Qualification to promotion play-off		0–2	1–0	4–0	1–1	4–0	1–0	2–1	1–1	5–0
2	Mostiștea Ulmu (Note: Mostiștea Ulmu were deducted 2 points.) (Q)	18	12	5	1	37	10	+27	39	Qualification to promotion play-off	0–1		2–0	3–3	1–0	2–0	3–0	4–0	3–0	6–1
3	Popești-Leordeni	18	8	5	5	27	20	+7	29 (Note: 1.Popești-Leordeni 10pts. 2.Axiopolis Cernavodă 5pts. 3.Viitorul II Constanța 2pts. (Table of head-to-head matches))		0–1	2–2		2–2	3–0	2–1	3–1	1–0	2–0	2–2
4	Axiopolis Cernavodă	18	8	5	5	46	33	+13	29		1–3	0–0	0–1		3–1	6–2	1–2	6–1	2–2	4–2
5	Viitorul Constanța II	18	8	5	5	42	28	+14	29		1–1	0–0	0–3	1–1		7–4	1–0	3–1	6–0	7–1
6	Agricola Borcea	18	7	2	9	37	40	−3	23		0–1	1–2	3–2	2–4	1–1		3–1	2–0	0–0	6–0
7	Înainte Modelu	18	6	1	11	30	30	0	19 (Note: Gloria Albești–Înainte Modelu 1–5; Înainte Modelu–Gloria Albești 0–1)		1–3	0–1	3–1	1–2	2–3	2–4		0–1	5–0	4–1
8	Gloria Albești	18	6	1	11	24	38	−14	19		0–4	0–1	1–1	4–3	2–3	2–0	1–5		0–1	5–2
9	Recolta Gheorghe Doja (O)	18	3	5	10	15	43	−28	14	Qualification to relegation play-out	0–4	1–1	0–1	2–7	2–0	1–4	1–1	0–1		4–1
10	Oltenița (O)	18	1	2	15	23	73	−50	5	Qualification to relegation play-out	2–7	1–4	1–1	0–1	2–7	3–4	0–2	0–4	4–0	

Source: FRF (in Romanian), Soccerway
Legend: Blue = home team win; Yellow = draw; Red = away team win.
Rules for classification: 1) Points; 2) Head-to-head points; 3) Head-to-head goal difference; 4) Head-to-head goals scored; 5) Head-to-head away goals scored; 6) Goal difference; 7) Goals scored.
(C) Champions; (O) Play-off winners; (Q) Qualified for the phase indicated

=== Seria IV ===
Pos	Team	Pld	W	D	L	GF	GA	GD	Pts	Promotion or relegation	STE	FCS	PRS	MBZ	TUN	VOL	DIN	RAP	CON	BAL
1	Steaua București (C, Q)	18	15	3	0	48	8	+40	48	Qualification to promotion play-off		1–1	4–1	5–0	0–0	1–0	4–0	2–0	2–0	5–1
2	FCSB II (Q)	18	12	3	3	42	20	+22	39	Qualification to promotion play-off	1–2		3–1	4–2	2–1	1–1	2–1	4–1	6–0	2–0
3	Progresul Spartac București	18	12	1	5	39	18	+21	37		0–2	4–0		3–0	1–2	3–1	5–1	3–1	2–2	7–0
4	Metalul Buzău	18	7	6	5	27	24	+3	27		2–2	1–1	1–0		0–1	2–0	4–1	2–1	3–0	3–0
5	Tunari	18	7	5	6	16	12	+4	26		0–1	0–2	0–1	0–0		0–0	0–1	1–0	5–1	3–0
6	Voluntari II	18	7	4	7	24	25	−1	25		0–3	1–4	0–1	2–1	0–0		3–3	2–1	4–1	3–0
7	Dinamo București II	18	7	3	8	34	34	0	24		1–3	3–2	1–2	2–2	2–0	1–2		3–2	5–0	5–1
8	Rapid București II	18	5	2	11	21	30	−9	17		0–1	0–3	0–2	1–1	1–1	2–1	1–0		0–1	4–2
9	Concordia Chiajna II (O)	18	2	4	12	16	45	−29	10	Qualification to relegation play-out	0–5	0–2	0–1	1–1	0–1	1–3	1–1	1–2		6–1
10	Balotești (R)	18	0	1	17	8	59	−51	1	Qualification to relegation play-out	1–5	1–2	0–2	0–2	0–1	0–1	0–3	0–4	1–1	

Source: FRF (in Romanian), Soccerway
Legend: Blue = home team win; Yellow = draw; Red = away team win.
Rules for classification: 1) Points; 2) Head-to-head points; 3) Head-to-head goal difference; 4) Head-to-head goals scored; 5) Head-to-head away goals scored; 6) Goal difference; 7) Goals scored.
(C) Champions; (O) Play-off winners; (Q) Qualified for the phase indicated; (R) Relegated

=== Seria V ===
Pos	Team	Pld	W	D	L	GF	GA	GD	Pts	Promotion or relegation	COR	SRB	BLJ	OCR	AST	KSE	PLO	OSK	ODO	KTB
1	Corona Brașov (C, P)	18	14	4	0	41	11	+30	46	Qualification to promotion play-off		2–1	3–0	3–1	2–1	5–1	1–0	2–0	1–0	6–1
2	SR Brașov (Q)	18	7	7	4	36	26	+10	28	Qualification to promotion play-off	1–1		2–2	3–0	2–2	1–1	2–1	1–2	1–2	4–0
3	Blejoi	18	8	3	7	30	33	−3	27		1–4	1–4		2–0	2–1	1–4	3–2	1–2	1–2	4–2
4	Olimpic Cetate Râșnov	18	7	3	8	26	26	0	24 (Note: 1.Olimpic Cetate Râșnov 17pts. 2.Astra II 15pts. 3.KSE Târgu Secuiesc 13pts. 4.Plopeni 10pts. 5.Sepsi OSK Sfântu Gheorghe II 5pts. (Table of head-to-head matches))		1–1	1–2	3–2		5–1	0–0	4–2	3–1	0–1	2–0
5	Astra II	18	7	3	8	29	26	+3	24		0–1	2–2	0–2	0–1		3–0	5–1	2–1	0–0	1–2
6	KSE Târgu Secuiesc	18	7	3	8	23	34	−11	24		1–3	2–3	1–3	1–4	1–4		1–0	3–0	2–1	1–0
7	Plopeni	18	7	3	8	26	24	+2	24		1–1	1–2	0–0	2–0	1–0	0–2		3–2	2–0	6–0
8	Sepsi OSK Sfântu Gheorghe II	18	7	3	8	30	28	+2	24		0–3	1–1	2–3	0–0	1–2	6–0	0–0		6–2	2–0
9	Odorheiu Secuiesc (O)	18	6	5	7	26	23	+3	23	Qualification to relegation play-out	1–1	2–2	1–1	3–0	1–2	0–0	0–1	2–3		5–0
10	Kids Tâmpa Brașov (O)	18	3	0	15	12	48	−36	9	Qualification to relegation play-out	0–1	3–2	0–1	2–1	1–3	0–2	1–3	0–1	0–3	

Source: FRF (in Romanian), Soccerway
Legend: Blue = home team win; Yellow = draw; Red = away team win.
Rules for classification: 1) Points; 2) Head-to-head points; 3) Head-to-head goal difference; 4) Head-to-head goals scored; 5) Head-to-head away goals scored; 6) Goal difference; 7) Goals scored.
(C) Champions; (O) Play-off winners; (P) Promoted; (Q) Qualified for the phase indicated

=== Seria VI ===
Pos	Team	Pld	W	D	L	GF	GA	GD	Pts	Promotion or relegation	VED	FIL	ROȘ	BAS	ALX	PUC	FLA	PET	UCV	ACA
1	Vedița Colonești (C, Q)	18	11	4	3	36	16	+20	37	Qualification to promotion play-off		0–0	2–0	2–2	1–0	1–0	0–0	3–1	4–2	7–0
2	Filiași (Q)	18	11	2	5	35	17	+18	35	Qualification to promotion play-off	1–2		2–0	2–0	1–2	1–0	2–1	5–0	2–1	7–0
3	Sporting Roșiori	18	9	4	5	28	20	+8	31		2–1	3–2		3–1	1–1	0–2	0–0	1–0	3–2	5–1
4	Unirea Bascov	18	9	3	6	33	25	+8	30 (Note: Alexandria–Unirea Bascov 0–2; Unirea Bascov–Alexandria 2–1)		2–1	1–2	3–0		2–1	5–3	2–3	1–1	2–3	2–0
5	Alexandria	18	8	6	4	31	17	+14	30		1–0	0–1	2–0	0–2		2–1	7–0	0–0	1–1	5–2
6	Pucioasa	18	7	7	4	26	21	+5	28		1–1	1–1	1–1	2–1	0–0		2–2	2–2	2–1	2–0
7	Flacăra Moreni	18	5	7	6	25	31	−6	22		2–3	3–1	0–0	1–1	2–2	1–3		1–1	4–2	2–0
8	Petrolul Potcoava	18	4	6	8	18	32	−14	18		0–3	2–1	0–4	0–1	0–3	0–1	2–0		2–2	3–1
9	Universitatea Craiova II (R)	18	2	3	13	28	40	−12	9	Qualification to relegation play-out	0–2	0–1	0–2	1–2	2–3	2–2	1–2	2–3		6–1
10	Academica Clinceni II (O)	18	2	2	14	14	55	−41	8	Qualification to relegation play-out	2–3	1–3	0–3	0–3	1–1	0–1	2–1	1–1	2–0	

Source: FRF (in Romanian), Soccerway
Legend: Blue = home team win; Yellow = draw; Red = away team win.
Rules for classification: 1) Points; 2) Head-to-head points; 3) Head-to-head goal difference; 4) Head-to-head goals scored; 5) Head-to-head away goals scored; 6) Goal difference; 7) Goals scored.
(C) Champions; (O) Play-off winners; (Q) Qualified for the phase indicated; (R) Relegated

=== Seria VII ===
Pos	Team	Pld	W	D	L	GF	GA	GD	Pts	Promotion or relegation	ȘEL	MĂG	VID	GAZ	DEV	GIL	HOR	JIU	HER	MIN
1	Viitorul Șelimbăr (C, P)	18	16	2	0	43	8	+35	50	Qualification to promotion play-off		3–1	2–0	1–0	1–1	3–2	3–0	1–0	1–0	7–0
2	Măgura Cisnădie (Q)	18	10	3	5	29	19	+10	33	Qualification to promotion play-off	0–1		4–2	2–2	2–0	2–2	1–0	0–0	2–1	0–1
3	Viitorul Dăești	18	8	3	7	35	32	+3	27		1–3	0–1		2–1	0–0	1–1	4–0	4–1	3–2	4–1
4	Gaz Metan Mediaș II	18	7	5	6	33	24	+9	26 (Note: 1.Gaz Metan Mediaș II 6pts. 2.CSM Deva 6pts. 3.Gilortul Târgu Cărbunești 6pts. (Table of head-to-head matches))		1–1	0–1	3–2		3–2	6–0	0–4	7–1	2–0	1–1
5	Deva	18	7	5	6	27	23	+4	26		1–2	3–0	1–2	3–1		1–0	1–1	2–0	2–1	3–0
6	Gilortul Târgu Cărbunești	18	7	5	6	29	31	−2	26		0–4	4–0	5–2	2–1	3–1		2–1	0–0	0–0	1–0
7	Flacăra Horezu	18	5	5	8	39	36	+3	20		1–3	0–3	3–1	1–3	3–3	3–3		3–0	8–0	5–1
8	Jiul Petroșani	18	4	7	7	18	29	−11	19		0–1	0–1	2–2	0–0	3–1	2–1	2–2		2–0	2–1
9	Hermannstadt II (R)	18	4	3	11	23	39	−16	15	Qualification to relegation play-out	0–4	0–1	2–3	0–1	1–1	3–1	4–2	1–1		4–3
10	Minerul Costești (R)	18	1	4	13	16	51	−35	7	Qualification to relegation play-out	0–2	0–8	0–2	1–1	0–1	1–2	2–2	2–2	2–4	

Source: FRF (in Romanian), Soccerway
Legend: Blue = home team win; Yellow = draw; Red = away team win.
Rules for classification: 1) Points; 2) Head-to-head points; 3) Head-to-head goal difference; 4) Head-to-head goals scored; 5) Head-to-head away goals scored; 6) Goal difference; 7) Goals scored.
(C) Champions; (P) Promoted; (Q) Qualified for the phase indicated; (R) Relegated

=== Seria VIII ===
Pos	Team	Pld	W	D	L	GF	GA	GD	Pts	Promotion or relegation	LIP	CRI	DUM	PRO	GHI	ACS	PER	GLT	EZR	FOR
1	Șoimii Lipova (C, Q)	18	12	5	1	37	12	+25	41	Qualification to promotion play-off		1–1	1–0	1–0	1–1	2–1	0–1	3–1	2–1	7–0
2	Crișul Chișineu-Criș (Q)	18	10	6	2	41	17	+24	36	Qualification to promotion play-off	1–1		2–1	1–1	2–1	1–0	2–1	2–0	0–3	8–2
3	Dumbrăvița	18	10	1	7	35	16	+19	31		1–2	2–1		2–1	0–1	0–1	0–1	9–1	2–0	3–0
4	Progresul Pecica	18	9	3	6	29	17	+12	30		0–1	1–1	0–1		1–0	0–2	2–0	0–1	2–0	2–0
5	Ghiroda	18	8	4	6	27	23	+4	28		1–2	2–2	1–0	2–6		0–2	4–1	0–1	4–3	2–0
6	Poli Timișoara	18	8	2	8	23	20	+3	26		0–1	0–2	0–2	0–3	1–4		7–0	2–1	2–0	3–2
7	Avântul Periam	18	6	6	6	22	28	−6	24		1–1	1–4	1–1	1–2	1–1	1–1		1–1	1–1	4–1
8	Gloria Lunca-Teuz Cermei	18	6	3	9	20	32	−12	21		1–1	0–0	2–3	1–3	0–1	1–0	0–2		1–2	3–0
9	Progresul Ezeriș (O)	18	4	3	11	17	32	−15	15	Qualification to relegation play-out	0–3	0–3	0–5	0–0	0–2	0–0	0–2	2–3		3–0
10	Fortuna Becicherecu Mic (R)	18	0	1	17	11	65	−54	1	Qualification to relegation play-out	1–7	0–8	1–3	3–5	0–0	0–1	0–2	1–2	0–2	

Source: FRF (in Romanian), Soccerway
Legend: Blue = home team win; Yellow = draw; Red = away team win.
Rules for classification: 1) Points; 2) Head-to-head points; 3) Head-to-head goal difference; 4) Head-to-head goals scored; 5) Head-to-head away goals scored; 6) Goal difference; 7) Goals scored.
(C) Champions; (O) Play-off winners; (Q) Qualified for the phase indicated; (R) Relegated

=== Seria IX ===
Pos	Team	Pld	W	D	L	GF	GA	GD	Pts	Promotion or relegation	CUG	UDJ	AVÂ	SAT	UNG	HUN	UNI	SSP	OCN	IND
1	Cugir (C, Q)	18	13	2	3	36	15	+21	41 (Note: Unirea Dej–Cugir 1–0; Cugir–Unirea Dej 1–0)	Qualification to promotion play-off		1–0	4–1	2–1	1–0	0–1	1–0	3–3	2–0	2–0
2	Unirea Dej (P)	18	13	2	3	42	22	+20	41	Qualification to promotion play-off	1–0		3–3	3–1	2–1	2–1	3–1	3–3	3–1	2–0
3	Avântul Reghin	18	9	4	5	36	25	+11	31		1–2	1–2		0–0	5–0	2–1	0–0	1–2	5–4	0–0
4	Sticla Arieșul Turda	18	7	5	6	32	25	+7	26		0–1	2–1	1–2		3–3	0–0	3–3	1–2	4–1	3–1
5	Unirea Ungheni	18	7	3	8	24	29	−5	24		1–0	1–3	1–2	0–3		2–1	2–3	2–1	2–1	2–0
6	Hunedoara	18	6	5	7	19	21	−2	23 (Note: Hunedoara–Unirea Alba Iulia 1–1; Unirea Alba Iulia–Hunedoara 0–1)		3–3	2–4	1–0	0–1	0–0		1–1	1–1	1–0	2–1
7	Unirea Alba Iulia	18	6	5	7	26	30	−4	23		1–4	3–1	1–4	2–1	2–3	0–1		1–1	2–1	0–0
8	Sănătatea Cluj	18	5	6	7	29	36	−7	21		0–1	0–3	1–2	3–3	1–4	2–1	1–3		1–0	3–4
9	Ocna Mureș (O)	18	5	1	12	24	39	−15	16	Qualification to relegation play-out	1–5	1–3	1–4	0–2	1–0	2–1	2–1	2–2		3–0
10	Industria Galda (R)	18	1	3	14	12	38	−26	6	Qualification to relegation play-out	1–4	0–3	1–3	1–3	0–0	0–1	1–2	1–2	1–3	

Source: FRF (in Romanian), Soccerway
Legend: Blue = home team win; Yellow = draw; Red = away team win.
Rules for classification: 1) Points; 2) Head-to-head points; 3) Head-to-head goal difference; 4) Head-to-head goals scored; 5) Head-to-head away goals scored; 6) Goal difference; 7) Goals scored.
(C) Champions; (O) Play-off winners; (P) Promoted; (Q) Qualified for the phase indicated; (R) Relegated

=== Seria X ===
Pos	Team	Pld	W	D	L	GF	GA	GD	Pts	Promotion or relegation	MIN	ZAL	GLO	CAO	CSC	SIL	SOM	STM	PRO	LUC
1	Minaur Baia Mare (C, Q)	18	11	4	3	41	22	+19	37	Qualification to promotion play-off		2–1	2–1	4–1	4–1	4–2	3–2	4–0	0–2	5–1
2	Zalău (Q)	18	11	3	4	38	22	+16	36	Qualification to promotion play-off	3–3		2–1	3–0	0–3	4–2	1–0	2–1	4–0	1–0
3	Gloria Bistrița	18	8	5	5	28	27	+1	29		0–0	0–4		1–1	2–0	3–1	5–3	2–1	0–0	2–0
4	CA Oradea	18	8	3	7	30	22	+8	27		2–1	1–1	2–3		1–0	4–0	1–0	3–0	8–1	0–1
5	Sânmartin	18	7	5	6	28	27	+1	26 (Note: Sportul Șimleu Silvaniei–Sânmartin 1–2; Sânmartin–Sportul Șimleu Silvaniei 1–1)		4–2	1–2	0–1	1–0		1–1	2–1	2–2	3–1	2–1
6	Sportul Șimleu Silvaniei	18	7	5	6	27	34	−7	26		0–0	1–0	1–1	1–1	2–2		3–2	2–1	2–1	2–1
7	Someșul Dej	18	8	1	9	32	27	+5	25		0–2	2–1	1–2	2–0	4–2	2–3		5–0	2–0	2–0
8	Satu Mare	18	5	4	9	26	33	−7	19 (Note: Satu Mare–Progresul Șomcuta Mare 4–1; Progresul Șomcuta Mare–Satu Mare 1–1)		1–1	3–3	4–2	1–0	0–1	2–0	0–1		4–1	5–0
9	Progresul Șomcuta Mare (O)	18	5	4	9	28	39	−11	19	Qualification to relegation play-out	1–3	1–2	5–2	2–4	1–1	4–1	0–0	1–1		4–2
10	Luceafărul Oradea (O)	18	2	2	14	15	40	−25	8	Qualification to relegation play-out	0–1	1–4	0–0	0–1	2–2	1–3	2–3	3–0	0–3	

Source: FRF (in Romanian), Soccerway
Legend: Blue = home team win; Yellow = draw; Red = away team win.
Rules for classification: 1) Points; 2) Head-to-head points; 3) Head-to-head goal difference; 4) Head-to-head goals scored; 5) Head-to-head away goals scored; 6) Goal difference; 7) Goals scored.
(C) Champions; (O) Play-off winners; (Q) Qualified for the phase indicated

== Promotion play-offs ==
=== First round ===
The first round of the promotion play-offs was played over two legs between the top two teams from each series, paired (1–2, 3–4, 5–6, 7–8, 9–10). The winners qualified for the second round.

Team 1	Agg.	Team 2	1st leg	2nd leg
Bucovina Rădăuți	2–4	Dacia Unirea Brăila	2–0	0–4
Oțelul Galați	3–0	Foresta Suceava	3–0	0–0
Afumați	4–2	FCSB II	0–1	4–1
Mostiștea Ulmu	0–4	Steaua București	0–2	0–2
Corona Brașov	5–0	Filiași	1–0	4–0
SR Brașov	1–2	Vedița Colonești	0–1	1–1
Crișul Chișineu-Criș	2–4	Viitorul Șelimbăr	0–2	2–2
Măgura Cisnădie	3–2	Șoimii Lipova	2–1	1–1
Zalău	5–0	Cugir	3–0	2–0
Minaur Baia Mare	1–3	Unirea Dej	0–0	1–3

7 May 2021	Corona Brașov	1–0	Filiași	Brașov
18:00 EEST (UTC+3)	Cristescu 73'	Report		Stadium: Silviu Ploeșteanu; Attendance: 0 Referee: Robert Avram (Pitești)

8 May 2021	Mostiștea Ulmu	0–2	Steaua București	Bucharest
11:30 EEST (UTC+3)		Report	Acasandrei 10' (o.g.); Pacionel 47' (pen.)	Stadium: Voința; Attendance: 0 Referee: Eduard Ioniță (Galați)

8 May 2021	SR Brașov	0–1	Vedița Colonești	Brașov
14:00 EEST (UTC+3)		Report	Ruță 74' (pen.)	Stadium: Silviu Ploeșteanu; Attendance: 0 Referee: Bogdan Dumitrache (Bucharest)

8 May 2021	Bucovina Rădăuți	2–0	Dacia Unirea Brăila	Rădăuți
18:00 EEST (UTC+3)	Florescu 23'; Stoian 31'	Report		Stadium: Municipal; Attendance: 0 Referee: Sergiu Mavriche (Bacău)

8 May 2021	Oțelul Galați	3–0	Foresta Suceava	Galați
18:00 EEST (UTC+3)	Neagu 57'; Cârjan 64'; Stoian 67' (pen.)	Report		Stadium: Oțelul; Attendance: 0 Referee: Vlad Baban (Iași)

8 May 2021	Crișul Chișineu-Criș	0–2	Viitorul Șelimbăr	Chișineu-Criș
18:00 EEST (UTC+3)		Report	A. Roșu 56'; Vișa 84'	Stadium: Crișul; Attendance: 0 Referee: Sorin Vădana (Cluj-Napoca)

8 May 2021	Măgura Cisnădie	2–1	Șoimii Lipova	Cisnădie
18:00 EEST (UTC+3)	Bărculeț 32'; Al. Ban 65'	Report	Salhi 68'	Stadium: Măgura; Attendance: 0 Referee: Cristian Georgescu (Bucharest)

8 May 2021	Zalău	3–0 (forfeit)	Cugir	Zalău
18:00 EEST (UTC+3)	Stanciu 39'; Forna 48'	Report		Stadium: Municipal; Attendance: 0 Referee: Ovidiu Mazilu (Satu Mare)

8 May 2021	Minaur Baia Mare	0–0	Unirea Dej	Baia Mare
18:00 EEST (UTC+3)		Report		Stadium: Viorel Mateianu; Attendance: 0 Referee: George Roman (Timișoara)

9 May 2021	Afumați	0–1	FCSB II	Afumați
11:45 EEST (UTC+3)		Report	Al. Stan 35'	Stadium: Comunal; Attendance: 0 Referee: George Găman (Craiova)

15 May 2021	Steaua București	2–0	Mostiștea Ulmu	Bucharest
11:30 EEST (UTC+3)	Pacionel 66' (pen.); Mihalache 90+4'			Stadium: Steaua 5 Attendance: 0 Referee: Florin Andrei (Târgu Mureș)

15 May 2021	Dacia Unirea Brăila	4–0	Bucovina Rădăuți	Însurăței
17:30 EEST (UTC+3)	Stănescu 59'; V. Robu 75'; Apostolache 84'; P. Petre 87'	Report		Stadium: Orășenesc; Attendance: 0 Referee: Claudiu Marcu (Constanța)

15 May 2021	Foresta Suceava	0–0	Oțelul Galați	Suceava
17:30 EEST (UTC+3)		Report		Stadium: Areni; Attendance: 0 Referee: Bogdan Dumitrache (Bucharest)

15 May 2021	Filiași	0–4	Corona Brașov	Filiași
17:30 EEST (UTC+3)		Report	Linguraru 71'; Drăgoi 76'; Nicolau 82'; Aszalos 89'	Stadium: Orășenesc; Attendance: 0 Referee: Sorin Costreie (Buftea)

15 May 2021	Vedița Colonești	1–1	SR Brașov	Colonești
17:30 EEST (UTC+3)	Dalu 72'	Report	Savu 5'	Stadium: Mircea Stan; Attendance: 0 Referee: Adrian Illyeș (Bucharest)

15 May 2021	Viitorul Șelimbăr	2–2	Crișul Chișineu-Criș	Avrig
17:30 EEST (UTC+3)	Monea 21'; Cîrstean 27'	Report	Budur 40'; Suslak 70' (pen.)	Stadium: Orășenesc; Attendance: 0 Referee: Cristian Codrea (Baia Mare)

15 May 2021	Șoimii Lipova	1–1	Măgura Cisnădie	Arad
17:30 EEST (UTC+3)	Filimon 35'	Report	Condrea 67'	Stadium: Sânnicolau Mic; Attendance: 0 Referee: Andrei Moroiță (Ploiești)

15 May 2021	Cugir	0–2	Zalău	Cugir
17:30 EEST (UTC+3)		Report	Stanciu 42'; Sg. Pop 44'	Stadium: Arena Cugir; Attendance: 0 Referee: Mircea Ardelean (Arad)

15 May 2021	Unirea Dej	3–1	Minaur Baia Mare	Dej
17:30 EEST (UTC+3)	Serediuc 32'; Al. Blaj 54'; Frăsineanu 88'	Report	Hațiegan 44'	Stadium: Unirea; Attendance: 0 Referee: Szabolcs Kovács (Carei)

16 May 2021	FCSB II	1–4	Afumați	Bucharest
11:30 EEST (UTC+3)	Chirițoiu 74'	Report	Stângă 14' (pen.); Tudorache 37', 52', 55'	Stadium: ARCOM; Attendance: 0 Referee: Viorel Flueran (Craiova)

=== Second round ===
The second round of the promotion play-offs was played over two legs between the teams qualified from the first round, with the winners promoted to Liga II.

Team 1	Agg.	Team 2	1st leg	2nd leg
Oțelul Galați	1–2	Dacia Unirea Brăila	1–1	0–1
Steaua București	4–1	Afumați	2–0	2–1
Vedița Colonești	1–3	Corona Brașov	1–2	0–1
Măgura Cisnădie	1–3	Viitorul Șelimbăr	0–2	1–1
Unirea Dej	1–1	Zalău	0–0	1–1

22 May 2021	Oțelul Galați	1–1	Dacia Unirea Brăila	Galați
13:30 EEST (UTC+3)	Răducan 37'	Report	Neagu 49' (o.g.)	Stadium: Oțelul; Attendance: 1,000; Referee: Robert Avram (Pitești)

22 May 2021	Steaua București	2–0	Afumați	Bucharest
17:30 EEST (UTC+3)	Al. Zaharia 6'; Chipirliu 28'	Report		Stadium: Steaua 5 Attendance: 500; Referee: Marcel Bîrsan (Bucharest)

22 May 2021	Vedița Colonești	1–2	Corona Brașov	Colonești
18:00 EEST (UTC+3)	Dalu 90+3' (pen.)	Report	Cîrstian 25'; Boția 68' (pen.)	Stadium: Mircea Stan; Attendance: 100; Referee: Claudiu Marcu (Constanța)

22 May 2021	Măgura Cisnădie	0–2	Viitorul Șelimbăr	Cisnădie
18:00 EEST (UTC+3)		Report	Cîrstean 68'; Roșu 70'	Stadium: Măgura; Attendance: 1,000; Referee: Vladimir Nagy (Măhăceni)

22 May 2021	Unirea Dej	0–0	Zalău	Dej
18:00 EEST (UTC+3)		Report		Stadium: Unirea; Attendance: 1,500; Referee: Andrei Moroiță (Ploiești)

29 May 2021	Corona Brașov	1–0	Vedița Colonești	Brașov
17:30 EEST (UTC+3)	Roșu 73'	Report		Stadium: Silviu Ploeșteanu; Attendance: 500; Referee: Szabolcs Kovács (Carei)

29 May 2021	Viitorul Șelimbăr	1–1	Măgura Cisnădie	Avrig
17:30 EEST (UTC+3)	Curtean 5'	Report	Stelea 15'	Stadium: Central; Attendance: 250; Referee: Viorel Flueran (Craiova)

29 May 2021	Zalău	1–1	Unirea Dej	Zalău
17:30 EEST (UTC+3)	Onicaș 60'	Report	Cătinean 90+6'	Stadium: Municipal; Attendance: 1,500; Referee: Rareș Vidican (Satu Mare)

30 May 2021	Dacia Unirea Brăila	1–0	Oțelul Galați	Însurăței
17:30 EEST (UTC+3)	Ioniță 86'	Report		Stadium: Orășenesc; Attendance: 1,000; Referee: Claudiu Marcu (Constanța)

30 May 2021	Afumați	1–2	Steaua București	Afumați
17:30 EEST (UTC+3)	Ad. Popa 45'	Report	Călințaru 3'; Pacionel 90' (pen.)	Stadium: Comunal; Attendance: 200; Referee: Iulian Călin (Ștefănești)

== See also ==
- 2020–21 Liga I
- 2020–21 Liga II
- 2020–21 Liga IV
- 2020–21 Cupa României
