= ACS Recolta Gheorghe Doja =

Romanian football club

Recolta Gheorghe Doja
- Full name: Asociația Club Sportiv Recolta Gheorghe Doja
- Nickname: Ialomițenii (The People from Ialomița)
- Short name: Recolta Doja
- Founded: 2002; 24 years ago
- Ground: Comunal
- Capacity: 700
- Owner: Gheorghe Doja Commune
- Chairman: Andrei Magdiel
- Manager: Mirel Condei
- League: Liga III
- 2025–26: Liga III, Seria III, 7th
- Website: https://acsrecoltagheorghedoja.com
Home colours	Away colours

Asociația Club Sportiv Recolta Gheorghe Doja, commonly known as Recolta Gheorghe Doja, is a Romanian football club based in the commune of Gheorghe Doja, Ialomița County, that currently competes in Liga III, the third tier of the Romanian football.

== History ==
Recolta Gheorghe Doja was founded in 2002 and initially competed in the second tier of the Ialomița county championships, the fifth level of the Romanian football league system. Recolta achieved its first-ever promotion to Liga III at the end of the 2018–19 season. Coached by Grigore Țuican, Ialomițenii won the county championship and the promotion play-off against Viitorul Pantelimon (2–0 at home, 0–0 away), the Ilfov County winners.

Recolta debuted in Liga III in the 2019–20 season with Cătălin Leșeanu appointed as head coach, struggling during its first campaign at this level and sitting in last place in Series III with just two points at the winter break. However, the suspension of the competition in March 2020 due to the COVID-19 pandemic ultimately spared the Ialomița side from relegation.

Marius Milea took charge as head coach for the 2020–21 season, leading Recolta to a 9th-place finish in Series III, qualifying for a promotion/relegation play-off against Rapid Buzescu, the winners of Liga IV – Teleorman County, a tie that Recolta won on aggregate after two legs (3–0 away, 2–0 at home).

The 2021–22 campaign began with Milea on the bench, but he left after two matchdays to take over Dunărea Călărași. He was replaced by Adrian Cristea, who guided Recolta to an 8th-place finish in the regular season and 7th place after the play-out stage of Series III.

During the 2022–23 campaign, Cristea was dismissed in March 2023 after sixteen rounds and replaced by Ion Ionescu, who led Recolta to a 6th-place finish in the regular season. He was then replaced at the end of April by assistant coach Valentin Toma, who remained in charge for the rest of the campaign, with Recolta finishing 8th overall after the play-out stage of Series III and avoiding relegation after being ranked first in the special table of the 8th-placed teams across the ten Liga III series.

In July 2023, Mirel Condei was named head coach for the 2023–24 campaign, leading Recolta to a 5th-place finish overall after the regular season and play-out stage of Series III. In the following 2024–25 season, the team improved further, finishing 2nd at the end of the regular season, qualifying for the play-off stage of Series III, and eventually finishing 4th overall.

== Honours ==
Liga IV – Ialomița County

- Winners (1): 2018–19
- Runners-up (2): 2016–17, 2017–18

== Ground ==
Recolta Gheorghe Doja plays its home matches at the Comunal Stadium in Gheorghe Doja, which has a capacity of 700.

== Former managers ==
- (Romania) Grigore Țuican (2018–2019)
- (Romania) Cătălin Leșeanu (2019–2020)
- (Romania) Marius Milea (2020–2021)
- (Romania) Adrian Cristea (2021–2023)
- (Romania) Ion Ionescu (2023)
- (Romania) Valentin Toma (2023)
- (Romania) Mirel Condei (2023–)
