= Cosmin Stoian =

Romanian footballer

Personal information
- Full name: Cosmin Valentin Stoian
- Date of birth: 8 January 1995 (age 31)
- Place of birth: Galați, Romania
- Height: 1.89 m (6 ft 2 in)
- Positions: Midfielder; forward

Team information
- Current team: Unirea Braniștea
- Number: 26

Youth career
- LPS Galați
- Oțelul Galați

Senior career*
Years	Team	Apps	(Gls)
2012–2014	Oțelul II Galați	0	(0)
2014–2015	Oțelul Galați	24	(0)
2016	Delta Dobrogea Tulcea	23	(5)
2016–2017	Metalosport Galați	0	(0)
2017–2021	Oțelul Galați	62	(14)
2021–	Unirea Braniștea	0	(0)
- * Club domestic league appearances and goals as of 11:15, 7 October 2021 (UTC)

Cosmin Valentin Stoian (born 8 January 1995) is a Romanian professional footballer who plays as a midfielder or forward for Unirea Braniștea.

== Honours ==
Oțelul Galați

- Liga III: 2020–21
