= 2022–23 Liga III =

Third tier Romanian football league

Liga III
- Season: 2022–23
- All statistics correct as of 14 June 2022.

The 2022–23 Liga III was the 67th season of Liga III, the third tier of the Romanian football league system. The season will begin in August 2022 and is scheduled to end in June 2023.

This season is the third consecutive with a format that will include 100 teams (10x10). The format was changed two seasons ago, due to the financial problems generated by the COVID-19 pandemic. The difference this season is that a play-off and play-out was introduced between the regular season and the promotion play-offs.

== Team changes ==
Promoted from 2021–22 Liga IV	Relegated from 2021–22 Liga II	Promoted to 2022–23 Liga II	Relegated to 2022–23 Liga IV
Viitorul Darabani (after 3 years of absence); Rapid Brodoc (debut); Sighetu Marmației (after 6 years of absence); Victoria Carei (after 15 years of absence); MSE Târgu Mureș (after 3 years of absence); Olimpic Zărnești (after 18 years of absence); Universitatea Alba Iulia (debut); Phoenix Buziaș (debut); Ineu (after 6 years of absence); Retezatul Hațeg (after 12 years of absence); Cozia Călimănești (after 30 years of absence); Dunărea Turris Turnu Măgurele (after 10 years of absence); Rucăr (debut); Amara (debut); Păulești (debut); CS FC Dinamo București (debut); Voința Limpeziș (debut); Unirea Braniștea (debut); Gloria Băneasa (debut)	Dunărea Călărași (after 7 years of absence); Dacia Unirea Brăila (after 1 year of absence); Astra Giurgiu (after 14 years of absence)	Oțelul Galați (ended 5-year stay); Progresul Spartac București (ended 5-year stay); CSM Slatina (ended 1-year stay); Dumbrăvița (ended 4-year stay); Minaur Baia Mare (ended 4-year stay)	Hușana Huși (ended 3-year stay); Rapid II București (ended 2-year stay); Academica II Clinceni (ended 2-year stay); Hermannstadt II (ended 2-year stay); Progresul Șomcuta Mare (ended 2-year stay); Frontiera Curtici (ended 1-year stay); Dinamo II București (ended 2-year stay); Fetești (ended 1-year stay); Făurei (ended 4-year stay); Sticla Arieșul Turda (ended 4-year stay); Viitorul II Târgu Jiu (ended 1-year stay); Argeș II Pitești (ended 1-year stay); Sportul Chiscani (ended 2-year stay); Pașcani (ended 32-year stay); Oltenița (ended 2-year stay); Luceafărul Oradea (ended 3-year stay); Poli Timișoara (ended 3-year stay)

=== Teams excluded by Romanian Football Federation ===
Academica Clinceni and Gaz Metan Mediaş relegated to Liga II at the end of the 2021–22 Liga I season. On 20 June 2022, Academica and on 27 June 2022, Gaz Metan was relegated directly to Liga III, by the Romanian Football Federation, which denied a second tier licence to Academica and Gaz Metan, due to important financial problems and unpaid debts to current and former players and managers.

Academica Clinceni II, the second team of Academica Clinceni, which was a Liga III member, was automatically relegated to Liga IV, as an indirect result of the first team relegation to the third tier.

On 8 August 2022, Academica Clinceni and Gaz Metan Mediaş were both excluded from all the competitions organized by the Romanian Football Federation, due to financial problems.

=== Withdrawn teams ===
Pandurii Târgu Jiu, Sporting Vaslui, Rapid II București, Hușana Huși, Speranța Răucești and Silvicultorul Maieru withdrew from the competition, before the start of the season.

=== Teams spared from relegation ===
Politehnica Timișoara and Unirea Constanța was spared from relegation to 2022–23 Liga III season, due to the decision to relegate Academica Clinceni and Gaz Metan Mediaş, decision that vacanted places in the 2022–23 Liga II season.

Aurul Brad was spared from relegation to 2022–23 Liga IV season, due to the decision to relegate Academica II Clinceni, decision that vacanted a place in the 2022–23 Liga III season.

CSM Bacău, Unirea Alba Iulia, Progresul Ezeriș, Flacăra Horezu, Kids Tâmpa Brașov and Minerul Costești were spared from relegation to 2022–23 Liga IV season, due to the exclusion of Academica Clinceni and Gaz Metan Mediaş and the withdrawn of Rapid II București, Hușana Huși, Speranța Răucești and Silvicultorul Maieru.

=== Other changes ===
Club Atletic Oradea enrolled in the 2022–23 Liga IV as the result of the broke up between the former associate members, the private part (owner of the Club Atletic Oradea and CAO-NAC brands) and the public part. The public part made a new entity (FC Bihor Oradea), that took the Liga III place, vacanted by Club Atletic Oradea.

CS Hunedoara officially bought FC Corvinul Hunedoara brand and was renamed as Corvinul Hunedoara. Due to merge between CS Hunedoara and the FC Corvinul brand, CS Hunedoara became the official successor of FC Corvinul.

Dunărea Turris Turnu Măgurele was renamed as Cetatea Turnu Măgurele.

CS Rucăr was moved from Rucăr to Câmpulung and was renamed as Muscelul Câmpulung Elite.

== League map ==
Locations of Liga III clubs by series
Seria I Seria II Seria III Seria IV Seria V Seria VI Seria VII Seria VIII Seria IX Seria X
Locations of Liga III clubs from Bucharest and the vicinity
Seria III Seria IV

== Regular season ==
=== Seria I ===
Pos	Team	Pld	W	D	L	GF	GA	GD	Pts	Promotion or relegation
1	Foresta Suceava	18	13	3	2	37	10	+27	42	Qualification to Play-Off round
2	Bucovina Rădăuți	18	12	1	5	39	18	+21	37	Qualification to Play-Off round
3	Ceahlăul Piatra Neamț	18	10	3	5	42	23	+19	33	Qualification to Play-Off round
4	CSM Bacău	18	9	6	3	33	21	+12	33	Qualification to Play-Off round
5	Știința Miroslava	18	9	2	7	26	19	+7	29	Qualification to Play-Out round
6	Șomuz Fălticeni	18	8	3	7	28	19	+9	27	Qualification to Play-Out round
7	Viitorul Darabani	18	5	1	12	18	41	−23	16	Qualification to Play-Out round
8	Rapid Brodoc	18	4	2	12	19	38	−19	14	Qualification to Play-Out round
9	Miercurea Ciuc II	18	2	4	12	9	36	−27	10	Qualification to Play-Out round
10	Dante Botoșani	18	5	1	12	13	39	−26	6 (Note: Dante Botoșani deducted 10 points. Subsequently was excluded from the competition and sanctioned with relegation to the last competitive category.)	Qualification to Play-Out round

Source: FRF (in Romanian), Soccerway
Rules for classification: 1) Points; 2) Head-to-head points; 3) Head-to-head goal difference; 4) Head-to-head goals scored;
5) Head-to-head away goals scored; 6) Goal difference; 7) Goals scored; 8)Play-off.

=== Seria II ===
Pos	Team	Pld	W	D	L	GF	GA	GD	Pts	Promotion or relegation
1	Râmnicu Sărat	18	14	3	1	39	7	+32	45	Qualification to Play-Off round
2	Metalul Buzău	18	13	2	3	46	10	+36	41	Qualification to Play-Off round
3	Unirea Braniștea	18	12	1	5	29	15	+14	37	Qualification to Play-Off round
4	Aerostar Bacău	18	10	4	4	50	21	+29	34	Qualification to Play-Off round
5	Focșani	18	9	4	5	40	17	+23	31	Qualification to Play-Out round
6	Sporting Liești	18	8	3	7	34	28	+6	27	Qualification to Play-Out round
7	Viitorul Ianca	18	5	4	9	22	37	−15	19	Qualification to Play-Out round
8	Dinamo Bacău	18	5	1	12	29	42	−13	16	Qualification to Play-Out round
9	Voința Limpeziș	18	1	2	15	20	65	−45	5	Qualification to Play-Out round
10	Dacia Unirea Brăila	18	0	2	16	8	75	−67	2	Qualification to Play-Out round

Source: FRF (in Romanian), Soccerway
Rules for classification: 1) Points; 2) Head-to-head points; 3) Head-to-head goal difference; 4) Head-to-head goals scored;
5) Head-to-head away goals scored; 6) Goal difference; 7) Goals scored; 8)Play-off.

=== Seria III ===
Pos	Team	Pld	W	D	L	GF	GA	GD	Pts	Promotion or relegation
1	Afumați	18	15	0	3	53	15	+38	45	Qualification to Play-Off round
2	Farul Constanța II	18	8	7	3	39	20	+19	31	Qualification to Play-Off round
3	Înainte Modelu	18	8	6	4	24	23	+1	30	Qualification to Play-Off round
4	Gloria Albești	18	9	2	7	48	32	+16	29	Qualification to Play-Off round
5	Gloria Băneasa	18	8	4	6	41	34	+7	28	Qualification to Play-Out round
6	Recolta Gheorghe Doja	18	7	4	7	39	33	+6	25	Qualification to Play-Out round
7	Dunărea Călărași	18	6	6	6	36	23	+13	24	Qualification to Play-Out round
8	Voluntari II	18	4	6	8	26	35	−9	18	Qualification to Play-Out round
9	Agricola Borcea	18	5	0	13	32	52	−20	15	Qualification to Play-Out round
10	Amara	18	2	1	15	12	83	−71	7	Qualification to Play-Out round

Source: FRF (in Romanian), Soccerway
Rules for classification: 1) Points; 2) Head-to-head points; 3) Head-to-head goal difference; 4) Head-to-head goals scored;
5) Head-to-head away goals scored; 6) Goal difference; 7) Goals scored; 8)Play-off.

=== Seria IV ===
Pos	Team	Pld	W	D	L	GF	GA	GD	Pts	Promotion or relegation
1	Tunari	16	13	1	2	43	10	+33	40	Qualification to Play-Off round
2	Popești-Leordeni	16	10	3	3	29	16	+13	33	Qualification to Play-Off round
3	Flacăra Moreni	16	7	2	7	21	24	−3	23	Qualification to Play-Off round
4	Real Bradu	16	6	4	6	22	36	−14	22 (Note: Real Bradu–CS Dinamo București 3–2; CS Dinamo București–Real Bradu 2–2)	Qualification to Play-Off round
5	CS Dinamo București	16	6	4	6	35	31	+4	22	Qualification to Play-Out round
6	Unirea Bascov	16	5	3	8	20	27	−7	18	Qualification to Play-Out round
7	FCSB II	16	4	5	7	32	35	−3	17	Qualification to Play-Out round
8	Pucioasa	16	3	6	7	18	22	−4	15	Qualification to Play-Out round
9	Muscelul Câmpulung Elite	16	2	4	10	11	30	−19	10	Qualification to Play-Out round
10	Astra Giurgiu	0	0	0	0	0	0	0	0 (Note: Astra Giurgiu withdrew in the first part of the season and all its results were canceled.)	Excluded

Source: FRF (in Romanian), Soccerway
Rules for classification: 1) Points; 2) Head-to-head points; 3) Head-to-head goal difference; 4) Head-to-head goals scored;
5) Head-to-head away goals scored; 6) Goal difference; 7) Goals scored; 8)Play-off.

=== Seria V ===
Pos	Team	Pld	W	D	L	GF	GA	GD	Pts	Promotion or relegation
1	Blejoi	18	13	3	2	54	19	+35	42	Qualification to Play-Off round
2	Plopeni	18	9	5	4	18	10	+8	32	Qualification to Play-Off round
3	Olimpic Cetate Râșnov	18	9	3	6	27	19	+8	30	Qualification to Play-Off round
4	SR Brașov	18	9	3	6	26	22	+4	30	Qualification to Play-Off round
5	Odorheiu Secuiesc	18	7	4	7	31	20	+11	25	Qualification to Play-Out round
6	Păulești	18	7	3	8	21	33	−12	24	Qualification to Play-Out round
7	Sepsi OSK II	18	5	4	9	25	39	−14	19	Qualification to Play-Out round
8	Kids Tâmpa Brașov	18	5	3	10	22	31	−9	18	Qualification to Play-Out round
9	Olimpic Zărnești	18	4	4	10	27	40	−13	16	Qualification to Play-Out round
10	KSE Târgu Secuiesc	18	4	4	10	15	33	−18	16	Qualification to Play-Out round

Source: FRF (in Romanian), Soccerway
Rules for classification: 1) Points; 2) Head-to-head points; 3) Head-to-head goal difference; 4) Head-to-head goals scored;
5) Head-to-head away goals scored; 6) Goal difference; 7) Goals scored; 8)Play-off.

=== Seria VI ===
Pos	Team	Pld	W	D	L	GF	GA	GD	Pts	Promotion or relegation
1	Alexandria	18	13	1	4	31	8	+23	40	Qualification to Play-Off round
2	Sporting Roșiori	18	10	2	6	37	22	+15	32	Qualification to Play-Off round
3	Flacăra Horezu	18	9	5	4	27	19	+8	32	Qualification to Play-Off round
4	Viitorul Dăești	18	8	6	4	27	15	+12	30	Qualification to Play-Off round
5	Cetatea Turnu Măgurele	18	8	4	6	26	28	−2	28	Qualification to Play-Out round
6	Cozia Călimănești	18	5	7	6	21	24	−3	22	Qualification to Play-Out round
7	Petrolul Potcoava	18	6	4	8	14	20	−6	22	Qualification to Play-Out round
8	Universitatea II Craiova	18	5	4	9	21	21	0	19	Qualification to Play-Out round
9	Vedița Colonești	18	4	3	11	14	33	−19	15	Qualification to Play-Out round
10	Minerul Costești	18	3	2	13	10	38	−28	11	Qualification to Play-Out round

Source: FRF (in Romanian), Soccerway
Rules for classification: 1) Points; 2) Head-to-head points; 3) Head-to-head goal difference; 4) Head-to-head goals scored;
5) Head-to-head away goals scored; 6) Goal difference; 7) Goals scored; 8)Play-off.

=== Seria VII ===
Pos	Team	Pld	W	D	L	GF	GA	GD	Pts	Promotion or relegation
1	Deva	18	14	4	0	62	9	+53	46	Qualification to Play-Off round
2	Filiași	18	12	1	5	45	28	+17	37	Qualification to Play-Off round
3	Gilortul Târgu Cărbunești	18	11	3	4	31	23	+8	36	Qualification to Play-Off round
4	Viitorul Șimian	18	11	1	6	49	29	+20	34	Qualification to Play-Off round
5	Jiul Petroșani	18	8	4	6	31	21	+10	28	Qualification to Play-Out round
6	Voința Lupac	18	8	3	7	30	23	+7	27	Qualification to Play-Out round
7	Aurul Brad	18	4	2	12	27	56	−29	14	Qualification to Play-Out round
8	Retezatul Hațeg	18	3	4	11	23	34	−11	13	Qualification to Play-Out round
9	Viitorul Târgu Jiu II	18	3	2	13	19	62	−43	11	Qualification to Play-Out round
10	Progresul Ezeriș	18	2	4	12	11	43	−32	10	Qualification to Play-Out round

Source: FRF (in Romanian), Soccerway
Rules for classification: 1) Points; 2) Head-to-head points; 3) Head-to-head goal difference; 4) Head-to-head goals scored;
5) Head-to-head away goals scored; 6) Goal difference; 7) Goals scored; 8)Play-off.

=== Seria VIII ===
Pos	Team	Pld	W	D	L	GF	GA	GD	Pts	Promotion or relegation
1	Reșița	18	13	3	2	43	9	+34	42	Qualification to Play-Off round
2	Șoimii Lipova	18	12	3	3	36	13	+23	39	Qualification to Play-Off round
3	Ghiroda	18	11	3	4	33	18	+15	36	Qualification to Play-Off round
4	Crișul Chișineu-Criș	18	7	7	4	26	19	+7	28	Qualification to Play-Off round
5	Progresul Pecica	18	6	5	7	33	32	+1	23	Qualification to Play-Out round
6	Pobeda Stár Bišnov	18	7	2	9	24	38	−14	23	Qualification to Play-Out round
7	Phoenix Buziaș	18	4	7	7	24	28	−4	19	Qualification to Play-Out round
8	Avântul Periam	18	4	4	10	23	48	−25	16	Qualification to Play-Out round
9	ACB Ineu	18	2	6	10	16	32	−16	12	Qualification to Play-Out round
10	Gloria Lunca-Teuz Cermei	18	2	4	12	13	34	−21	10	Qualification to Play-Out round

Source: FRF (in Romanian), Soccerway
Rules for classification: 1) Points; 2) Head-to-head points; 3) Head-to-head goal difference; 4) Head-to-head goals scored;
5) Head-to-head away goals scored; 6) Goal difference; 7) Goals scored; 8)Play-off.

=== Seria IX ===
Pos	Team	Pld	W	D	L	GF	GA	GD	Pts	Promotion or relegation
1	Corvinul Hunedoara	18	17	1	0	61	9	+52	52	Qualification to Play-Off round
2	Unirea Ungheni	18	10	2	6	34	26	+8	32	Qualification to Play-Off round
3	Metalurgistul Cugir	18	9	4	5	28	21	+7	31	Qualification to Play-Off round
4	Unirea Alba Iulia	18	9	3	6	33	26	+7	30	Qualification to Play-Off round
5	MSE Târgu Mureș	18	7	3	8	31	31	0	24	Qualification to Play-Out round
6	Avântul Reghin	18	6	6	6	21	26	−5	24	Qualification to Play-Out round
7	Universitatea Alba Iulia	18	5	6	7	17	22	−5	21	Qualification to Play-Out round
8	Viitorul Cluj	18	4	4	10	18	29	−11	16	Qualification to Play-Out round
9	Sănătatea Cluj	18	4	2	12	35	54	−19	14	Qualification to Play-Out round
10	Ocna Mureș	18	2	3	13	22	56	−34	9	Qualification to Play-Out round

Source: FRF (in Romanian), Soccerway
Rules for classification: 1) Points; 2) Head-to-head points; 3) Head-to-head goal difference; 4) Head-to-head goals scored;
5) Head-to-head away goals scored; 6) Goal difference; 7) Goals scored; 8)Play-off.

=== Seria X ===
Pos	Team	Pld	W	D	L	GF	GA	GD	Pts	Promotion or relegation
1	Bihor Oradea	18	13	1	4	39	24	+15	40	Qualification to Play-Off round
2	Satu Mare	18	12	2	4	35	17	+18	38 (Note: Gloria–Satu Mare 1–0; Satu Mare–Gloria 1–0)	Qualification to Play-Off round
3	Gloria Bistrița-Năsăud	18	12	2	4	29	12	+17	38	Qualification to Play-Off round
4	Lotus Băile Felix	18	7	6	5	27	24	+3	27 (Note: Zalău–Lotus 0–1; Lotus–Zalău 0–0)	Qualification to Play-Off round
5	Zalău	18	8	3	7	24	20	+4	27	Qualification to Play-Out round
6	Minerul Ocna Dej	18	6	3	9	22	27	−5	21	Qualification to Play-Out round
7	Sighetu Marmației	18	5	5	8	25	34	−9	20	Qualification to Play-Out round
8	CFR II Cluj	18	4	4	10	16	29	−13	16	Qualification to Play-Out round
9	Victoria Carei	18	4	2	12	15	31	−16	14	Qualification to Play-Out round
10	Sportul Șimleu Silvaniei	18	3	4	11	14	28	−14	11 (Note: Sportul Șimleu Silvaniei were deducted 2 points due to financial debts to former players.)	Qualification to Play-Out round

Source: FRF (in Romanian), Soccerway
Rules for classification: 1) Points; 2) Head-to-head points; 3) Head-to-head goal difference; 4) Head-to-head goals scored;
5) Head-to-head away goals scored; 6) Goal difference; 7) Goals scored; 8)Play-off.

== Play-off round ==
=== Seria I ===
Pos	Team	Pld	W	D	L	GF	GA	GD	Pts	Promotion or relegation
1	Foresta Suceava (C, Q)	9	3	4	2	10	9	+1	55	Qualification to Promotion play-offs
2	Ceahlăul Piatra Neamț (Q)	9	4	4	1	15	14	+1	49	Qualification to Promotion play-offs
3	CSM Bacău	9	3	3	3	11	10	+1	45	
4	Bucovina Rădăuți	9	2	1	6	11	14	−3	44	

Source: FRF (in Romanian)
Rules for classification: 1) Points; 2) Points in the regular season; 3) Head-to-head points; 4) Head-to-head goal difference; 5) Head-to-head goals scored;
6) Head-to-head away goals scored; 7) Goal difference (regular season + play off); 8) Goals scored (regular season + play off); 9) Play-off.
(C) Champions; (Q) Qualified for the phase indicated

=== Seria II ===
Pos	Team	Pld	W	D	L	GF	GA	GD	Pts	Promotion or relegation
1	Metalul Buzău (C, Q)	9	5	2	2	14	10	+4	58	Qualification to Promotion play-offs
2	Râmnicu Sărat (Q)	9	3	2	4	11	11	0	56	Qualification to Promotion play-offs
3	Unirea Braniștea	9	5	2	2	9	7	+2	54	
4	Aerostar Bacău	9	2	0	7	9	15	−6	40	

Source: FRF (in Romanian)
Rules for classification: 1) Points; 2) Points in the regular season; 3) Head-to-head points; 4) Head-to-head goal difference; 5) Head-to-head goals scored;
6) Head-to-head away goals scored; 7) Goal difference (regular season + play off); 8) Goals scored (regular season + play off); 9) Play-off.
(C) Champions; (Q) Qualified for the phase indicated

=== Seria III ===
Pos	Team	Pld	W	D	L	GF	GA	GD	Pts	Promotion or relegation
1	Afumați (C, Q)	9	8	0	1	29	2	+27	69	Qualification to Promotion play-offs
2	Farul Constanța II (Q)	9	5	1	3	28	10	+18	47	Qualification to Promotion play-offs
3	Gloria Albești	9	3	1	5	9	26	−17	39	
4	Înainte Modelu	9	1	0	8	4	32	−28	33	

Source: FRF (in Romanian)
Rules for classification: 1) Points; 2) Points in the regular season; 3) Head-to-head points; 4) Head-to-head goal difference; 5) Head-to-head goals scored;
6) Head-to-head away goals scored; 7) Goal difference (regular season + play off); 8) Goals scored (regular season + play off); 9) Play-off.
(C) Champions; (Q) Qualified for the phase indicated

=== Seria IV ===
Pos	Team	Pld	W	D	L	GF	GA	GD	Pts	Promotion or relegation
1	Tunari (C, Q)	9	6	1	2	30	13	+17	59	Qualification to Promotion play-offs
2	Popești-Leordeni (Q)	9	5	2	2	21	14	+7	50	Qualification to Promotion play-offs
3	Flacăra Moreni	9	4	1	4	11	16	−5	36	
4	Real Bradu	9	1	0	8	6	25	−19	25	

Source: FRF (in Romanian)
Rules for classification: 1) Points; 2) Points in the regular season; 3) Head-to-head points; 4) Head-to-head goal difference; 5) Head-to-head goals scored;
6) Head-to-head away goals scored; 7) Goal difference (regular season + play off); 8) Goals scored (regular season + play off); 9) Play-off.
(C) Champions; (Q) Qualified for the phase indicated

=== Seria V ===
Pos	Team	Pld	W	D	L	GF	GA	GD	Pts	Promotion or relegation
1	Blejoi (C, Q)	9	5	2	2	18	14	+4	59	Qualification to Promotion play-offs
2	Plopeni (Q)	9	3	4	2	9	6	+3	45	Qualification to Promotion play-offs
3	SR Brașov	9	1	6	2	11	13	−2	39	
4	Olimpic Cetate Râșnov	9	1	4	4	11	16	−5	37	

Source: FRF (in Romanian)
Rules for classification: 1) Points; 2) Points in the regular season; 3) Head-to-head points; 4) Head-to-head goal difference; 5) Head-to-head goals scored;
6) Head-to-head away goals scored; 7) Goal difference (regular season + play off); 8) Goals scored (regular season + play off); 9) Play-off.
(C) Champions; (Q) Qualified for the phase indicated

=== Seria VI ===
Pos	Team	Pld	W	D	L	GF	GA	GD	Pts	Promotion or relegation
1	Alexandria (C, Q)	9	8	0	1	29	9	+20	64	Qualification to Promotion play-offs
2	Viitorul Dăești (Q)	9	6	0	3	18	10	+8	48	Qualification to Promotion play-offs
3	Sporting Roșiori	9	4	0	5	16	23	−7	44	
4	Flacăra Horezu	9	0	0	9	6	27	−21	32	

Source: FRF (in Romanian)
Rules for classification: 1) Points; 2) Points in the regular season; 3) Head-to-head points; 4) Head-to-head goal difference; 5) Head-to-head goals scored;
6) Head-to-head away goals scored; 7) Goal difference (regular season + play off); 8) Goals scored (regular season + play off); 9) Play-off.
(C) Champions; (Q) Qualified for the phase indicated

=== Seria VII ===
Pos	Team	Pld	W	D	L	GF	GA	GD	Pts	Promotion or relegation
1	Deva (C, Q)	9	3	2	4	17	15	+2	57	Qualification to Promotion play-offs
2	Filiași (Q)	9	5	2	2	15	12	+3	54	Qualification to Promotion play-offs
3	Gilortul Târgu Cărbunești	9	4	1	4	11	14	−3	49	
4	Viitorul Șimian	9	3	1	5	10	12	−2	44	

Source: FRF (in Romanian)
Rules for classification: 1) Points; 2) Points in the regular season; 3) Head-to-head points; 4) Head-to-head goal difference; 5) Head-to-head goals scored;
6) Head-to-head away goals scored; 7) Goal difference (regular season + play off); 8) Goals scored (regular season + play off); 9) Play-off.
(C) Champions; (Q) Qualified for the phase indicated

=== Seria VIII ===
Pos	Team	Pld	W	D	L	GF	GA	GD	Pts	Promotion or relegation
1	Reșița (C, Q)	9	6	1	2	16	3	+13	61	Qualification to Promotion play-offs
2	Șoimii Lipova (Q)	9	4	3	2	10	9	+1	54	Qualification to Promotion play-offs
3	Ghiroda	9	4	1	4	15	12	+3	49	
4	Crișul Chișineu-Criș	9	1	1	7	9	26	−17	42	

Source: FRF (in Romanian)
Rules for classification: 1) Points; 2) Points in the regular season; 3) Head-to-head points; 4) Head-to-head goal difference; 5) Head-to-head goals scored;
6) Head-to-head away goals scored; 7) Goal difference (regular season + play off); 8) Goals scored (regular season + play off); 9) Play-off.
(C) Champions; (Q) Qualified for the phase indicated

=== Seria IX ===
Pos	Team	Pld	W	D	L	GF	GA	GD	Pts	Promotion or relegation
1	Corvinul Hunedoara (C, Q)	9	8	1	0	26	7	+19	77	Qualification to Promotion play-offs
2	Unirea Ungheni (Q)	9	3	1	5	12	16	−4	42	Qualification to Promotion play-offs
3	Unirea Alba Iulia	9	3	2	4	12	18	−6	41	
4	Metalurgistul Cugir	9	1	2	6	8	17	−9	36	

Source: FRF (in Romanian)
Rules for classification: 1) Points; 2) Points in the regular season; 3) Head-to-head points; 4) Head-to-head goal difference; 5) Head-to-head goals scored;
6) Head-to-head away goals scored; 7) Goal difference (regular season + play off); 8) Goals scored (regular season + play off); 9) Play-off.
(C) Champions; (Q) Qualified for the phase indicated

=== Seria X ===
Pos	Team	Pld	W	D	L	GF	GA	GD	Pts	Promotion or relegation
1	Bihor Oradea (C, Q)	9	7	0	2	21	10	+11	61	Qualification to Promotion play-offs
2	Gloria Bistrița-Năsăud (Q)	9	5	3	1	15	9	+6	56	Qualification to Promotion play-offs
3	Satu Mare	9	2	1	6	7	16	−9	45	
4	Lotus Băile Felix	9	1	2	6	9	17	−8	32	

Source: FRF (in Romanian)
Rules for classification: 1) Points; 2) Points in the regular season; 3) Head-to-head points; 4) Head-to-head goal difference; 5) Head-to-head goals scored;
6) Head-to-head away goals scored; 7) Goal difference (regular season + play off); 8) Goals scored (regular season + play off); 9) Play-off.
(C) Champions; (Q) Qualified for the phase indicated

== Play-out round ==
=== Seria I ===
Pos	Team	Pld	W	D	L	GF	GA	GD	Pts	Qualification or relegation
5	Știința Miroslava	8	4	2	2	14	13	+1	43	
6	Șomuz Fălticeni	8	2	3	3	9	10	−1	36	
7	Rapid Brodoc	8	5	2	1	17	7	+10	31	
8	Viitorul Darabani (O)	8	3	2	3	8	10	−2	27	Possible relegation to Liga IV
9	Csíkszereda II (R)	8	1	1	6	5	13	−8	14	Relegation to Liga IV
10	Dante Botoșani (Note: Dante Botoșani was excluded from the competition and sanctioned with relegation to the last competitive category.) (D)	0	0	0	0	0	0	0	0	Excluded

Source: FRF (in Romanian)
Rules for classification: 1) Points; 2) Points in the regular season; 3) Head-to-head points; 4) Head-to-head goal difference; 5) Head-to-head goals scored;
6) Head-to-head away goals scored; 7) Goal difference (regular season + play out); 8) Goals scored (regular season + play out); 9) Play-off.
(D) Disqualified; (O) Play-off winners; (R) Relegated

=== Seria II ===
Pos	Team	Pld	W	D	L	GF	GA	GD	Pts	Qualification or relegation
5	Sporting Liești	10	7	1	2	21	10	+11	49	
6	Focșani	10	5	1	4	23	9	+14	47	
7	Viitorul Ianca	10	6	2	2	30	14	+16	39	
8	Dinamo Bacău (R)	10	4	1	5	25	21	+4	29	Possible relegation to Liga IV
9	Voința Limpeziș (R)	10	4	1	5	19	20	−1	18	Relegation to Liga IV
10	Dacia Unirea Brăila (R)	10	1	0	9	10	54	−44	5	Relegation to Liga IV

Source: FRF (in Romanian)
Rules for classification: 1) Points; 2) Points in the regular season; 3) Head-to-head points; 4) Head-to-head goal difference; 5) Head-to-head goals scored;
6) Head-to-head away goals scored; 7) Goal difference (regular season + play out); 8) Goals scored (regular season + play out); 9) Play-off.
(R) Relegated

=== Seria III ===
Pos	Team	Pld	W	D	L	GF	GA	GD	Pts	Qualification or relegation
5	Dunărea Călărași	10	5	3	2	20	12	+8	42	
6	Gloria Băneasa	10	4	2	4	18	20	−2	42	
7	Voluntari II	10	6	3	1	27	12	+15	39	
8	Recolta Gheorghe Doja (O)	10	3	3	4	18	21	−3	37	Possible relegation to Liga IV
9	Agricola Borcea (R)	10	5	2	3	32	13	+19	32	Relegation to Liga IV
10	Amara (R)	10	0	1	9	3	40	−37	8	Relegation to Liga IV

Source: FRF (in Romanian)
Rules for classification: 1) Points; 2) Points in the regular season; 3) Head-to-head points; 4) Head-to-head goal difference; 5) Head-to-head goals scored;
6) Head-to-head away goals scored; 7) Goal difference (regular season + play out); 8) Goals scored (regular season + play out); 9) Play-off.
(O) Play-off winners; (R) Relegated

=== Seria IV ===
Pos	Team	Pld	W	D	L	GF	GA	GD	Pts	Qualification or relegation
5	Unirea Bascov	8	4	3	1	12	8	+4	33	
6	CS Dinamo București	8	3	1	4	12	13	−1	32	
7	Pucioasa	8	3	1	4	10	10	0	25	
8	Muscelul Câmpulung Elite (O)	8	6	0	2	13	8	+5	25 (Note: Muscelul Câmpulung Elite deducted 3 points.)	Possible relegation to Liga IV
9	FCSB II (R)	8	1	1	6	7	15	−8	21	Relegation to Liga IV
10	Astra Giurgiu (Note: Astra Giurgiu was excluded in the first part of the season and all its results were canceled.) (D)	0	0	0	0	0	0	0	0	Excluded

Source: FRF (in Romanian)
Rules for classification: 1) Points; 2) Points in the regular season; 3) Head-to-head points; 4) Head-to-head goal difference; 5) Head-to-head goals scored;
6) Head-to-head away goals scored; 7) Goal difference (regular season + play out); 8) Goals scored (regular season + play out); 9) Play-off.
(D) Disqualified; (O) Play-off winners; (R) Relegated

=== Seria V ===
Pos	Team	Pld	W	D	L	GF	GA	GD	Pts	Qualification or relegation
5	Odorheiu Secuiesc	10	7	1	2	28	8	+20	48	
6	Păulești	10	5	2	3	17	24	−7	41	
7	Sepsi OSK II	10	5	1	4	26	15	+11	35	
8	Olimpic Zărnești (O)	10	4	3	3	23	18	+5	31	Possible relegation to Liga IV
9	Kids Tâmpa Brașov (R)	10	3	1	6	14	24	−10	28	Relegation to Liga IV
10	KSE Târgu Secuiesc (R)	10	1	2	7	13	32	−19	21	Relegation to Liga IV

Source: FRF (in Romanian)
Rules for classification: 1) Points; 2) Points in the regular season; 3) Head-to-head points; 4) Head-to-head goal difference; 5) Head-to-head goals scored;
6) Head-to-head away goals scored; 7) Goal difference (regular season + play out); 8) Goals scored (regular season + play out); 9) Play-off.
(O) Play-off winners; (R) Relegated

=== Seria VI ===
Pos	Team	Pld	W	D	L	GF	GA	GD	Pts	Qualification or relegation
5	Cetatea Turnu Măgurele	10	3	3	4	14	12	+2	40	
6	Universitatea Craiova II	10	4	4	2	26	18	+8	35	
7	Petrolul Potcoava	10	2	5	3	11	17	−6	33	
8	Cozia Călimănești (O)	10	2	4	4	13	18	−5	32	Possible relegation to Liga IV
9	Vedița Colonești (R)	10	5	1	4	14	16	−2	31	Relegation to Liga IV
10	Minerul Costești (R)	10	4	3	3	19	16	+3	26	Relegation to Liga IV

Source: FRF (in Romanian)
Rules for classification: 1) Points; 2) Points in the regular season; 3) Head-to-head points; 4) Head-to-head goal difference; 5) Head-to-head goals scored;
6) Head-to-head away goals scored; 7) Goal difference (regular season + play out); 8) Goals scored (regular season + play out); 9) Play-off.
(O) Play-off winners; (R) Relegated

=== Seria VII ===
Pos	Team	Pld	W	D	L	GF	GA	GD	Pts	Qualification or relegation
5	Voința Lupac	10	7	0	3	31	14	+17	48	
6	Jiul Petroșani	10	2	1	7	8	15	−7	35	
7	Viitorul Târgu Jiu II	10	7	0	3	22	14	+8	32	
8	Retezatul Hațeg (O)	10	6	0	4	17	14	+3	31	Possible relegation to Liga IV
9	Aurul Brad (R)	10	5	1	4	16	17	−1	30	Relegation to Liga IV
10	Progresul Ezeriș (R)	10	1	2	7	13	33	−20	15	Relegation to Liga IV

Source: FRF (in Romanian)
Rules for classification: 1) Points; 2) Points in the regular season; 3) Head-to-head points; 4) Head-to-head goal difference; 5) Head-to-head goals scored;
6) Head-to-head away goals scored; 7) Goal difference (regular season + play out); 8) Goals scored (regular season + play out); 9) Play-off.
(O) Play-off winners; (R) Relegated

=== Seria VIII ===
Pos	Team	Pld	W	D	L	GF	GA	GD	Pts	Qualification or relegation
5	Progresul Pecica	10	8	0	2	29	13	+16	47	
6	Phoenix Buziaș	10	8	1	1	30	10	+20	44	
7	Avântul Periam	10	5	0	5	21	19	+2	31	
8	Pobeda Stár Bišnov (R)	10	1	2	7	8	33	−25	28	Possible relegation to Liga IV
9	ACB Ineu (R)	10	4	1	5	18	20	−2	25	Relegation to Liga IV
10	Gloria Lunca-Teuz Cermei (R)	10	2	0	8	12	23	−11	16	Relegation to Liga IV

Source: FRF (in Romanian)
Rules for classification: 1) Points; 2) Points in the regular season; 3) Head-to-head points; 4) Head-to-head goal difference; 5) Head-to-head goals scored;
6) Head-to-head away goals scored; 7) Goal difference (regular season + play out); 8) Goals scored (regular season + play out); 9) Play-off.
(R) Relegated

=== Seria IX ===
Pos	Team	Pld	W	D	L	GF	GA	GD	Pts	Qualification or relegation
5	Universitatea Alba Iulia	10	5	2	3	15	12	+3	38	
6	MSE Târgu Mureș	10	3	4	3	16	15	+1	37	
7	Avântul Reghin	10	4	1	5	10	14	−4	37	
8	Viitorul Cluj (O)	10	4	3	3	13	10	+3	31	Possible relegation to Liga IV
9	Sănătatea Cluj (R)	10	4	1	5	20	17	+3	27	Relegation to Liga IV
10	Ocna Mureș (R)	10	4	1	5	17	23	−6	22	Relegation to Liga IV

Source: FRF (in Romanian)
Rules for classification: 1) Points; 2) Points in the regular season; 3) Head-to-head points; 4) Head-to-head goal difference; 5) Head-to-head goals scored;
6) Head-to-head away goals scored; 7) Goal difference (regular season + play out); 8) Goals scored (regular season + play out); 9) Play-off.
(O) Play-off winners; (R) Relegated

=== Seria X ===
Pos	Team	Pld	W	D	L	GF	GA	GD	Pts	Qualification or relegation
5	Zalău	10	8	1	1	22	4	+18	52	
6	Minerul Ocna Dej	10	5	1	4	11	11	0	37	
7	Sighetu Marmației	10	4	2	4	11	6	+5	34	
8	Victoria Carei (O)	10	5	1	4	15	19	−4	30	Possible relegation to Liga IV
9	CFR II Cluj (R)	10	3	3	4	12	12	0	28	Relegation to Liga IV
10	Sportul Șimleu Silvaniei (R)	10	1	0	9	5	24	−19	14	Relegation to Liga IV

Source: FRF (in Romanian)
Rules for classification: 1) Points; 2) Points in the regular season; 3) Head-to-head points; 4) Head-to-head goal difference; 5) Head-to-head goals scored;
6) Head-to-head away goals scored; 7) Goal difference (regular season + play out); 8) Goals scored (regular season + play out); 9) Play-off.
(O) Play-off winners; (R) Relegated

== Promotion play-offs ==
The promotion play-offs are disputed between the first two teams from each of the ten play-off round series. Only the best five teams will be promoted to 2023–24 Liga II.

=== First round ===
Team 1	Agg.	Team 2	1st leg	2nd leg
Râmnicu Sărat	1–3	Foresta Suceava	1–1	0–2
Ceahlăul Piatra Neamț	3–2	Metalul Buzău	1–1	2–1
Popești-Leordeni	3–2	Afumați	2–1	1–1
Farul Constanța II	3–5	Tunari	3–1	0–4
Viitorul Dăești	9–6	Blejoi	3–4	6–2
Plopeni	0–2	Alexandria	0–1	0–1
Șoimii Lipova	2–3	Deva	0–1	2–2
Filiași	2–7	Reșița	2–2	0–5
Gloria Bistrița-Năsăud	2–4	Corvinul Hunedoara	1–2	1–2
Unirea Ungheni	4–3	Bihor Oradea	1–1	3–2

=== Second round ===
Team 1	Agg.	Team 2	1st leg	2nd leg
Foresta Suceava	0–2	Ceahlăul Piatra Neamț	0–0	0–2
Popești-Leordeni	3–4	Tunari	2–1	1–3
Viitorul Dăești	1–6	Alexandria	0–2	1–4
Deva	4–6	Reșița	2–3	2–3
Unirea Ungheni	1–6	Corvinul Hunedoara	0–2	1–4

== Possible relegation ==
At the end of the season, a special table was made between 8th places from the 10 series. The last team in this table, with the lowest coefficient points per game, was also relegated in the 2023–24 Liga IV.

Pos	Team	Pld	W	D	L	GF	GA	GD	Pts	PPG	Relegation
1	Recolta Gheorghe Doja	28	10	7	11	57	54	+3	37	1.32	
2	Muscelul Câmpulung Elite	24	8	4	12	24	38	−14	28	1.17	
3	Cozia Călimănești	28	7	11	10	34	42	−8	32	1.14	
4	Olimpic Zărnești	28	8	7	13	50	58	−8	31	1.11	
5	Retezatul Hațeg	28	9	4	15	40	48	−8	31	1.11	
6	Viitorul Cluj	28	8	7	13	31	39	−8	31	1.11	
7	Victoria Carei	28	9	3	16	30	50	−20	30	1.07	
8	Dinamo Bacău	28	9	2	17	54	63	−9	29	1.04	
9	Viitorul Darabani	26	8	3	15	26	51	−25	27	1.04	
10	Pobeda Stár Bišnov (R)	24	5	9	10	32	61	−29	24	1.00	Relegation to Liga IV

Source: FRF (in Romanian)
(R) Relegated
