= Stadionul Central (Avrig) =

Stadium

- Interactive map of Stadionul Central
- Address: Str. Stadionului
- Location: Avrig, Romania
- Coordinates: 45°43′47.6″N 24°23′06.6″E
- Owner: Town of Avrig
- Operator: FC Avrig
- Capacity: 1,000 seated
- Surface: Grass

Construction
- Opened: 2013
- Architect: Conlan Grup

Tenants
- FC Avrig (2013–present); 1599 Șelimbăr (2020–2022)

Stadionul Central is a multi-purpose stadium in Avrig, Romania. It is currently used mostly for football matches, is the home ground of FC Avrig. The stadium was opened in 2013 and has a capacity of 1,000 seats.
