= Raul Stanciu =

Romanian footballer (born 2007)

Personal information
- Full name: Raul Alexandru Stanciu
- Date of birth: 26 March 2007 (age 19)
- Place of birth: Arad, Romania
- Height: 1.84 m (6 ft 0 in)
- Position: Winger

Team information
- Current team: Rapid Bucureşti
- Number: 98

Youth career
- –2021: ACS Socodor
- 2021–2022: Atletico Arad
- 2024–2025: Lecce

Senior career*
Years	Team	Apps	(Gls)
2022–2023	Progresul Pecica		
2023–2024	UTA Arad	5	(0)
2025–	Rapid Bucureşti	0	(0)
2025–2026	→ Tunari (loan)	12	(1)

International career^{‡}
2023	Romania U17	3	(0)
2024–2025	Romania U18	9	(1)
2025–	Romania U19	2	(0)
- * Club domestic league appearances and goals as of 22 February 2026 ‡ National team caps and goals as of 15 November 2025

Raul Alexandru Stanciu (born 26 March 2007) is a Romanian professional footballer who plays as a winger for Liga I club Rapid Bucureşti.

== Club career ==
=== UTA Arad ===
He made his Liga I debut for UTA Arad against Universitatea Craiova on 18 August 2023. He debuted at 16 years and 5 months, at that time being the youngest debutant for UTA Arad in Liga I.

== Career statistics ==
As of match played 22 February 2026

Appearances and goals by club, season and competition
Club	Season	League			Cupa României		Europe		Other		Total	
Club	Season	Division	Apps	Goals	Apps	Goals	Apps	Goals	Apps	Goals	Apps	Goals
Progresul Pecica	2022–23	Liga III	?	?	?	?	—		—		?	?
UTA Arad	2023–24	Liga I	4	0	4	0	—		—		8	0
UTA Arad	2024–25	Liga I	1	0	0	0	—		—		1	0
UTA Arad	Total		5	0	4	0	—		—		9	0
Rapid Bucureşti	2025–26	Liga I	0	0	—		—		—		0	0
Rapid Bucureşti	2026–27	Liga I	0	0	0	0	—		—		0	0
Rapid Bucureşti	Total		0	0	0	0	—		—		0	0
Tunari (loan)	2025–26	Liga II	12	1	—		—		—		12	1
Career total			17	1	4	0	—		—		21	1
