= CS Gloria Albești =

Romanian football club

Gloria Albești
- Full name: Clubul Sportiv Gloria Albești
- Short name: Gloria Albești
- Founded: 1974; 52 years ago
- Ground: Central
- Capacity: 1,000
- Owner: Albești Commune
- League: Liga IV
- 2025–26: Liga IV, Constanța County, 12th of 16
Home colours	Away colours

Clubul Sportiv Gloria Albești, commonly known as Gloria Albești, is Romanian football club based in Albești, Constanța County and currently playing in the Liga IV – Constanța County, the fourth tier of Romanian football.

== History ==
Gloria Albești was founded in 1974 and initially played in the Mangalia City Championship, the fifth tier of Romanian football and the second at the county level. Over the next forty-six years, the club competed consistently in the Constanța County Championships.

Gloria earned promotion to the third division at the end of the 2019–20 season, being declared county champions and selected as the representative of Constanța County for the Liga III promotion play-off to Liga III. They were the only team among the top four that met the requirements of the medical protocol after the season was suspended in March 2020 due to the COVID-19 pandemic in Romania. Since the winner of Liga IV – Tulcea County, Pescărușul Sarichioi, did not participate in the play-off, Gloria Albești faced CSM Râmnicu Sărat, the winner of Liga IV – Buzău County, in a decisive match. The game ended 0–0, with Gloria winning 4–3 on penalties at Oțelul Stadium in Galați. The team, led by Ionel Melenco, included players such as David Gârniță, Rareș Micu, Răzvan Arteni, Ilie Ionuț (cpt.), Adelin Cristea, Alexandru Boț, Cornel Ciobanu, Adrian Moga, Ciprian Loloț, Mihai Zugravu, Vasile Șicu, Marian Canțur, Valentin Găiceanu, Daniel Simion, Tănase Halep and Marius Busuioc.

The 2020–21 season marked Gloria’s debut in Liga III. After a disappointing first half of the season, Ionel Melenco was dismissed and replaced by Vasile Enache, who guided the team to an 8th place finish.

In the following season, the team from the small South-East Romanian commune narrowly missed out on qualification for the play-off in the last round but finished first in the play-out, securing 5th place in the overall Series II ranking. In the 2022–23 campaign, Gloria ranked 4th in the regular season and finished 3rd after the Series III play-off round. However, the team withdrew from Liga III at the end of the season.

For 2023–24, Gloria was enrolled in the South Series of Liga V – Constanța County, the fifth tier of the Romanian football league system, where it finished in 3rd place and earned promotion to Liga IV – Constanța County at the end of the 2024–25 season, winning the series.

== Honours ==
Liga IV – Constanța County

- Winners (1): 2019–20

Liga V – Constanța County

- Winners (1): 2024–25

== League and Cup history ==
Season	Tier	Division	Place	Notes	Cupa României
2024–25	5	Liga V (CT) (South Series)	1st (C)	Promoted	
2023–24	5	Liga V (CT) (South Series)	3rd		First round
2022–23	3	Liga III (Seria III)	3rd	Withdrew	First round
2021–22	3	Liga III (Seria III)	5th		First round
2020–21	3	Liga III (Seria III)	8th		

Season	Tier	Division	Place	Notes	Cupa României
2019–20	4	Liga IV (CT)	1st (C)	Promoted	
2018–19	4	Liga IV (CT)	4th		
2017–18	4	Liga IV (CT)	9th		
2016–17	4	Liga IV (CT)	7th		
2015–16	5	Liga V (CT)	3rd	Promoted	
