= ACS Progresul Ezeriș =

Romanian football club

Progresul Ezeriș
- Full name: Asociația Club Sportiv Progresul Ezeriș
- Short name: Ezeriș
- Founded: 2015; 10 years ago
- Ground: Gloria
- Capacity: 4,300
- Owner: Ezeriș Commune
- League: not active at senior level
- 2022–23: Liga III, Seria VII, 10th (relegated)

Asociația Club Sportiv Progresul Ezeriș, commonly known as Progresul Ezeriș, is a Romanian football club based in Ezeriș, Caraș-Severin County, currently playing in Liga IV – Caraș-Severin County, the fourth tier of the Romanian football league system, following their relegation from the Liga III at the end of the 2022–23 season.

== History ==
Progresul Ezeriș was founded in the summer of 2015 at the initiative of Cristian Șodâncă supported by Ioan Rusu, the mayor of Ezeriș commune. The club was enrolled in Liga V – Caraș-Severin County, the fifth tier of the Romanian football and played its home matches on Arsenal and Gloria stadiums from Reșița.

In their first season, with Cristian Șodâncă as head coach and with some experienced players such as Alin Gurici, Dumitru Irizoiu, Alex Pintea, Păunel Secula, Alin Man and Claudiu Balaci, Progresul finished 3rd in the Reșița Zone.

The next season, Progresul narrowly missed the promotion, after was ranked 3rd in the regular season, the team coached by Robert Nosal, finished 2nd in the Reșița Zone play-off at 3 points behind Steaua Dunării Pojejena.

Progresul obtained the promotion at the end of the 2017–18 season, after dominating the Reșița Zone series finishing first in both the regular season and play-offs with just one defeat in 24 matches. The squad coached by Cristian Șodâncă was composed of: Alex Varga, Alin Bobină, Alexandru Rusnac, Flavius Duman, Răzvan Ciurea, Păunel Secula, Denis Guțu, Horea Marișescu, Patrick Măduță, Iosif Budai, Marian Pisoi, Radu Bălăuroiu, Alin Man, Cosmin Roșu, Viorel Drăgoi, Adrian Dumitru, Gabriel Vamanu, Alexandru Leonte, Alex Pintea, Dorian Dragocea, Andrei Gîjiu, Alexandru Gîjiu, Dorin Hranisavlevici, Darius Coucuzel, Claudiu Icob, Stelian Bresteanu.

The club appointed Adrian Enășescu as head coach and, after a 7th place in the 2018–19 season, Progresul Ezeriș earned the promotion to Liga III at the end of the 2019–20 season. Progresul was declared county champion, after the season was curtailed due to the COVID-19 pandemic in Romania, being in first place in the Oravița Zone and the team with the most points in both series of the Liga IV – Caraș-Severin County, and promoted after won the promotion play-off group played against Știința Turceni, the winner of Liga IV – Gorj County and Victoria Zăbrani, the winner of Liga IV – Arad County.

== Honours ==
Liga IV – Caraș-Severin County

- Winners (1): 2019–20

Liga V – Caraș-Severin County

- Winners (1): 2017–18
- Runners-up (1): 2016–17

== League history ==
Season	Tier	Division	Place	Notes	Cupa României
2022–23	3	Liga III (Seria VII)	10th	Relegated	
2021–22	3	Liga III (Seria VII)	9th		
2020–21	3	Liga III (Seria VII)	9th		
2019–20	4	Liga IV (CS) (Oravița Zone)	1st (C)	Promoted	

Season	Tier	Division	Place	Notes	Cupa României
2018–19	4	Liga IV (CS)	7th		
2017–18	5	Liga V (CS) (Reșița Zone)	1st (C)	Promoted	
2016–17	5	Liga V (CS) (Reșița Zone)	2nd		
2015–16	5	Liga V (CS) (Reșița Zone)	3rd		
