= CSA =

CSA, csa, or Csa may refer to:

== Art, entertainment, and media ==
- Canadian Screen Awards, the annual awards ceremony by the Academy of Canadian Cinema & Television
- Commission on Superhuman Activities, a fictional agency in Marvel Comics
- Crime Syndicate of America, DC Comics supervillains
- C.S.A.: The Confederate States of America, an 2004 alternative history mockumentary film

== Businesses and organizations ==
=== Businesses ===
- Connectivity Standards Alliance, formerly known as the Zigbee Alliance
- Cambridge Scientific Abstracts, a provider of online databases
- CSA Mine, Cobar, New South Wales, Australia

=== Education ===
- Central Student Association, the University of Guelph, Ontario, Canada
- Civil Services Academy Lahore, Pakistan
- Colegio San Agustin (disambiguation), several Catholic schools
- College Student Alliance, a provincial advocacy organization in Ontario, Canada
- Crescent School of Architecture, Tamil Nadu, India

=== Governmental and political organizations ===
- CSA Group, formerly known as the Canadian Standards Association
- Campaign for a Scottish Assembly, an association of Scottish political parties and civic groups established in 1989
- Canadian Securities Administrators, an organization of provincial and territorial securities regulators
- Canadian Space Agency, the national space agency of Canada
- Central Statistical Agency, of Ethiopia
- Chief of Staff of the United States Army
- Child Support Agency, United Kingdom
- Child Support Agency (Australia)
- Northern Ireland Child Support Agency
- Community Strong Australia, an Australian political party
- Compatriots of South Africa, a South African political party
- Compliance, Safety, and Accountability, an American driver safety program of the Federal Motor Carrier Safety Administration
- Confederate States of America, an unrecognized breakaway republic 1861–1865
- Conseil supérieur de l'audiovisuel, a French broadcast content monitoring agency
- Conservation South Africa, the South African affiliate of Conservation International
- The Covenant, the Sword, and the Arm of the Lord, a 1970s-1980s American far-right anti-government militia
- Cyber Security Agency, Singapore

=== Professional and trade organizations ===
- Autonomous Trade Unions Centre (Central des Syndicats Autonomes), in Benin
- California Society of Anesthesiologists, United States
- CarSharing Association, a federation of carsharing organizations
- Casting Society of America, a professional association of casting directors
- Civil Service Alliance, a former British trade union federation
- Civil Service Association, in Trinidad and Tobago
- Chemical Abstracts Service, a division of the American Chemical Society
- Cloud Security Alliance, promoting cloud computing security
- Council of School Supervisors & Administrators, a New York City-based trade union
- Czech Society of Actuaries

=== Other organizations ===
- Canadian Snowbird Association, for travelling Canadians
- Certified Senders Alliance, a German whitelist for bulk email senders
- Chinese Islamic Association

== Science and technology ==
=== Mathematics and computing ===
- Cartan subalgebra
- Central simple algebra
- Client SMTP Authorization
- Common Scrambling Algorithm
- Intel Communication Streaming Architecture

=== Medicine and psychology ===
- Cationic steroid antibiotics, or ceragenins
- Central sleep apnea, a sleep disorder
- CernySmith Assessment, a psychological stress questionnaire
- Clinical Skills Assessment, now USMLE Step 2 Clinical Skills
- Cockayne syndrome A or ERCC8, a gene whose mutation causes Cockayne syndrome
- Cognitive styles analysis, a computerized measure of cognitive styles
- Ciclosporin A (CsA), an immunosuppressant drug

=== Other uses in science and technology ===
- Csa, the Köppen classification of hot-summer Mediterranean climate
- CSA keyboard, the keyboard layout used in Canada
- Camphorsulfonic acid
- Cardioid subwoofer array
- Carry-save adder or Carry-skip adder, digital circuits
- Chemical safety assessment
- Chief Scientific Adviser (disambiguation), several uses
- Complex segregation analysis, in genetic epidemiology
- Chemical Shift Anisotropy, the orientation dependence of chemical shift

== Sports ==
- Canadian Soccer Association, the governing body of soccer in Canada
- Cano Sport Academy, a football club in Equatorial Guinea
- Centro Sportivo Alagoano, a football club in Brazil
- Competition Stableford Adjustment, a golf scoring adjustment
- Cricket South Africa, the governing body of cricket in South Africa

== Transportation ==
- Czech Airlines, abbreviated as ČSA (ICAO airline code: CSA)
- Czech Sport Aircraft, an aircraft manufacturer
- Common Support Aircraft, a former U.S. Navy concept

== Other uses ==
- Child sexual abuse, a form of child abuse
- Commission sharing agreement, in financial services
- Corporate sociopolitical activism, a firm's public demonstration of support or opposition
- Community-supported agriculture, an alternative socioeconomic model of agriculture and food distribution
- Combined statistical area, defined by the U.S. Office of Management and Budget
- Confederate States of America, an unrecognized state in North America (1861–1865)
  - Confederate States Army, the land warfare force of the Confederate States
- Controlled Substances Act, a United States drug-regulating law
- Credit Support Annex, a legal document regulating collateral for derivative transactions
- Chiltepec Chinantec language, an ISO 639-3 code
