= WORK-IX =

Internet exchange point in Germany

- Full name: Deutscher Commercial Internet Exchange
- Abbreviation: DE-CIX
- Founded: 2002
- Location: Hamburg, Germany
- Website: www.work-ix.net
- Members: 34
- Peak: 3.5 Gbit/s
- Daily (avg.): 1.3 Gbit/s

WORK-IX is an Internet Exchange Point situated in Hamburg (Germany).

Founded in 2002 by Hamburg ISP n@work, it enjoyed some growth, mainly with other regional players and content delivery networks.

In 2007, DE-CIX acquired WORK-IX and took over operations. It continues to provide interconnections for regional traffic. It is open to both eco members and the general public.
