= Călin Târnăvean =

Romanian footballer

Personal information
- Date of birth: 3 January 1984 (age 42)
- Place of birth: Târgu Mureș, Romania
- Height: 1.81 m (5 ft 11 1/2 in)
- Position: Striker

Senior career*
Years	Team	Apps	(Gls)
2004–2005	ASA Târgu Mureş	22	(8)
2005–2009	Gloria Bistriţa	29	(5)
2008–2009	→ FCM Târgu Mureş (loan)	20	(3)
2009–2010	Mureşul Deva	12	(2)
2010–2011	FCM Târgu Mureş	3	(1)
- * Club domestic league appearances and goals

Călin Târnăvean (born 3 January 1984) is a Romanian former footballer.

== See also ==
- Football in Romania
