= CS Silvania Șimleu Silvaniei =

Romanian football club

Sportul Șimleu Silvaniei
- Full name: Club Sportiv Silvania; Șimleu Silvaniei
- Nickname(s): Șimleuanii (The People from Șimleu); Alb-albaștrii (The White and Blues); Echipa de sub Măgură (The Team below Măgura Hill)
- Short name: Silvania
- Founded: 1960; 65 years ago Măgura Șimleu Silvaniei; 12 March 2007; 18 years ago Sportul Șimleu Silvaniei
- Ground: Măgura
- Capacity: 1,537
- Owner: Șimleu Silvaniei Municipality
- League: not active at senior level
- 2022–23: Liga III, Seria X, 10th (relegated)
Home colours	Away colours

Club Sportiv Silvania Șimleu Silvaniei, commonly known as Silvania Șimleu Silvaniei, or simply as Șimleu Silvaniei, is a Romanian professional football club based in Șimleu Silvaniei, Sălaj County. The team was established for the first time in the early 1960s, under the name of Măgura Șimleu Silvaniei.

The club was renamed as Silvania Șimleu Silvaniei in the mid 2000s and reached its best performance and played at the level of Liga II, before it was dissolved in 2011. In the summer of 2011, Sportul Șimleu was re-activated and enrolled in the 5th tier, then in 2012 was enrolled in the 4th tier struggling for years to promote again in the national divisions. Finally, Sportul Șimleu Silvaniei promoted in the Liga III at the end of the 2020–21 season.

== History ==
=== Mobila, the team of the furniture factory (1960–2007) ===
Silvania Șimleu Silvaniei was established in the early 1960s under the name of Măgura Șimleu Silvaniei, Măgura being the hill under which the town of Șimleu Silvaniei is located. Măgura was a well known team at county level, level which it managed to win at the end of the 1960s, even twice (1969–70 and 1970–71). 1971–72 was the first one spent by Măgura at the level of Divizia C, but the results were disappointing and the team based in Șimleu Silvaniei was ranked the last, relegating back in the county championship. It was a period of reinvention for the local football, Măgura merged with another team from Șimleu Silvaniei, Metal-Lemn (team financially supported by the local factory), then changed its name in Mobila Șimleu Silvaniei.

During the 1970s, the team of Șimleu Silvaniei was spending its time between the third tier and the fourth tier, in a continuous reorganization and reinvention that led to numerous name changing, from Măgura and Mobila to Gloria, Viitorul, Izolatorul or Izomat. The white and blues found some constancy after 1990, when financially supported by the local furniture factory and under the name of Mobila Șimleu Silvaniei was a regular presence at the level of third division.

=== The surprising FC Silvania (2007–2011) ===
FC Silvania crest, used between 2008 and 2011.

Silvania Șimleu Silvaniei was founded on 12 March 2007, under the name of Sportul Șimleu Silvaniei, in order to continue the football legacy from Șimleu Silvaniei, after the dissolution of the former team Mobila Șimleu Silvaniei. After only one year, the club’s management decided to merge with Liga III side Flacăra Halmășd, a club that had previously acquired its third-tier spot from Someșul Satu Mare.

The club was renamed as FC Silvania Șimleu Silvaniei and was coached by Mircea Bolba between June 2008 and October 2008, benefiting from the services of a lot of young talented players. "The team below Măgura Hill" it wasn't placed between the teams who were in cards for the promotion to Liga II, everyone thinking of FC Baia Mare, CFR II Cluj or CSM Sebeș, but carried away by the enthusiasm specific to young players and working with dedication and professionalism, the boys succeeded to finish the 2008–09 season on the 2nd position.

Occupying the 2nd place, the team was granted the right to participate at a promotion play-off to the Liga II. in this tournament șimleuanii met FC Caracal and CS Ineu winning both matches, 3–0 and 2–0. By doing this, the club promoted for the first time in its short history to the Liga II.

In the first year of Liga II, FC Silvania started with Dacian Nastai as the head coach and the team performed above expectations, especially in the first part of the season. At one point they were in the top 6 of the table, and have achieved promising results against teams such as Dacia Mioveni, UTA Arad or FCM Târgu Mureș. In the second half of the season the team didn't maintain its previous form and after a highly controversial match against FC Baia Mare they were penalised for violent conduct and were deducted three points by the Romanian Football Federation, besides losing the match 3–0 by decision. The team was finally ranked 11th, easily avoiding relegation.

In July 2010, FC Silvania appointed former CFR Cluj player Adrian Anca as the new general manager of the team and also constructions were started to modernize the Măgura Stadium for the start of the next season. Unfortunately the start of the new season didn't go according to plans and on 25 October 2010, Adrian Anca was sacked and was replaced by former Luceafărul Oradea manager Florin Farcaș. Unfortunately, before the start of the second half of the 2010–11 Liga II season the club was dissolved, thus ending a short but beautiful history.

=== A new beginning (2011–present) ===
CS Sportul crest, used between 2008 and 2011.

After the dissolution of FC Silvania, the football squad moved back on the old entity, Sportul Șimleu Silvaniei, entity that was enrolled in the Liga V – Sălaj County (5th and the last division). After only one year, the team based in Șimleu Silvaniei received a wild card and entered directly in the Liga IV Sălaj, where it struggled for years to promote back in the national division. Sportul won its league at the end of the 2013–14 season, but lost 3–5 the promotion play-off against CSC Sânmartin, Bihor County champions.

Sportul Șimleu finally promoted at the end of the 2020–21 season, even that it lost again its promotion play-off, this time 0–2 against Progresul Șomcuta Mare, Maramureș County champions.

In the summer of 2023 the club was re-organized again, now as CS Silvania Șimleu Silvaniei.

== Ground ==
Silvania Șimleu Silvaniei plays its home matches on the Măgura Stadium in Șimleu Silvaniei, with a capacity of 1,537 seats.

== Honours ==
=== Leagues ===
- Liga III
  - Runners-up (1): 2008–09
- Liga IV – Sălaj County
  - Winners (10): 1969–70, 1970–71, 1974–75, 1977–78, 1983–84, 1986–87, 1994–95, 2002–03, 2013–14, 2019–20
  - Runners-up (1): 1972–73
- Liga V – Sălaj County
  - Runners-up (1): 2011–12

== Chronology of names ==
Name	Period
Măgura Șimleu Silvaniei	1960–1974
Mobila Șimleu Silvaniei	1974–1975
Gloria Șimleu Silvaniei	1975–1977
Viitorul Șimleu Silvaniei	1977–1979
Izolatorul Șimleu Silvaniei	1979–1982
Izolatorul Armătura Șimleu Silvaniei	1982–1984
Gloria Armătura Șimleu Silvaniei	1984–1985
Izolatorul Armătura Șimleu Silvaniei	1985–1986
Izomat Șimleu Silvaniei	1986–1989
Mobila Șimleu Silvaniei	1989–2007
Sportul Șimleu Silvaniei	2007–2008
Silvania Șimleu Silvaniei	2008–2011
Sportul Șimleu Silvaniei	2011–2023
Silvania Șimleu Silvaniei	2023–present

== League history ==
Season	Tier	Division	Place	Notes	Cupa României
2022–23	3	Liga III (Seria X)	10th	Relegated	
2021–22	3	Liga III (Seria X)	6th		
2020–21	3	Liga III (Seria X)	6th		
2019–20	4	Liga IV (SJ)	1st (C)	Promoted	Preliminary Rounds
2018–19	4	Liga IV (SJ)	4th		
2017–18	4	Liga IV (SJ)	5th		
2016–17	4	Liga IV (SJ)	7th		

Season	Tier	Division	Place	Notes	Cupa României
2015–16	4	Liga IV (SJ)	13th		
2014–15	4	Liga IV (SJ)	4th		
2013–14	4	Liga IV (SJ)	1st (C)	Promoted	Preliminary Rounds
2012–13	4	Liga IV (SJ)	7th		
2011–12	5	Liga V (SJ)	2nd		
2010–11	2	Liga II (Seria II)	15th	Relegated	Round of 32
2009–10	2	Liga II (Seria II)	11th		
2008–09	3	Liga III (Seria VI)	2nd	Promoted	

== Former managers ==
- (Romania) Mircea Bolba (2008)
- (Romania) Adrian Anca (2010)
- (Romania) Marius Baciu (2011)
- (Romania) Dănuț Șomcherechi (2022–2023)
