= Stadionul Măgura (Șimleu Silvaniei) =

Romanian sports stadium

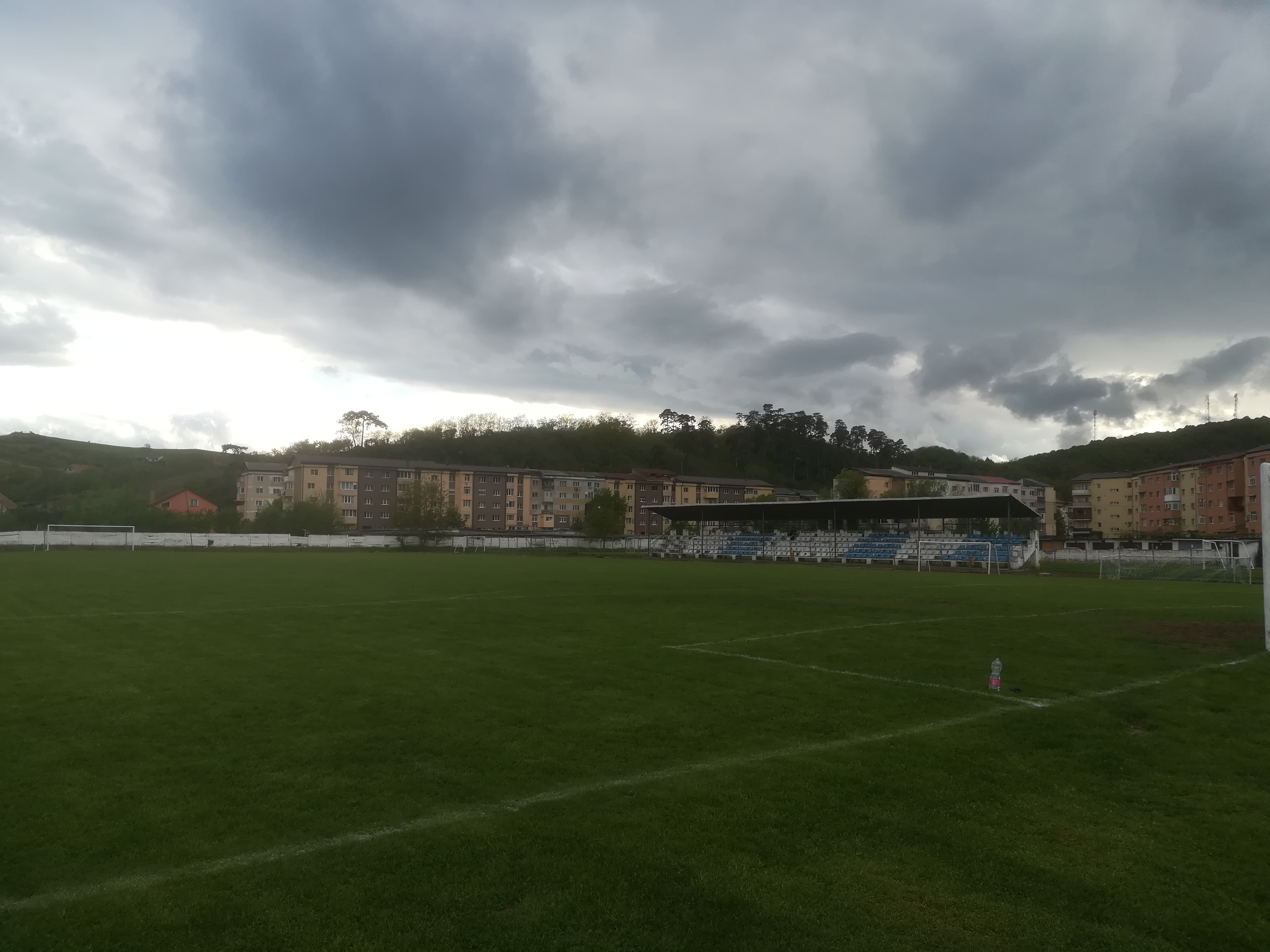
- Interactive map of Stadionul Măgura
- Location: Șimleu Silvaniei, Romania
- Coordinates: 47°13′35″N 22°47′52″E
- Owner: Municipality of Șimleu Silvaniei
- Operator: Silvania Șimleu Silvaniei
- Capacity: 1,537
- Surface: Grass

Tenants
- Mobila Șimleu Silvaniei; Silvania Șimleu Silvaniei (2007–Present)

Măgura Stadium is a multi-use stadium in Șimleu Silvaniei. It is the home ground of Silvania Șimleu Silvaniei. It holds 1,537 people all on seats.

== See also ==
- CS Silvania Șimleu Silvaniei
- Football in Romania
