= Ceragenix Pharmaceuticals =

American pharmaceutical company

Ceragenix Pharmaceuticals logo

Ceragenix Pharmaceuticals, Inc. is a biopharmaceutical company headquartered in Denver, Colorado that develops prescription therapies based on a platform of proprietary surface active technologies—skin Barrier Repair Technology (BRT) and Cerageninis, a new class of broad spectrum anti-infectives. The company discovers, develops and commercializes anti-infective drugs based on its proprietary class of compounds, Ceragenins. Active against a range of gram positive and gram negative bacteria, these agents are being developed as anti-infective medical device coatings and as therapeutics for antibiotic-resistant organisms.

== Products ==
Ceragenix developed EpiCeram, a topical non-steroidal skin care cream based on the research of Peter Elias for the treatment of atopic dermatitis (eczema).

Ceragenix's second platform technology addresses multidrug resistant bacterial and viral infections. The anti-infective technology is based on the research of Dr. Paul B. Savage, Professor and Associate Chair of Departments of Chemistry and Biochemistry at Brigham Young University (BYU, Provo, Utah). These compounds are aminosterols that mimic the activity of the naturally occurring antimicrobial peptides which form part of the human immune system and early line of defense against bacterial, viruses, fungi and certain cancers. The Ceragenins have been the subject of in vitro analysis and have demonstrated a range of action against methicillin-resistant Staphylococcus aureus (MRSA), vancomycin-resistant Staphylococcus aureus (VRSA), tobramycin-resistant Pseudomonas aeruginosa (PATR), Escherichia coli, vaccinia virus, HIV, and Bacillus anthracis (anthrax) among others. The compounds work by breaching the outer membranes of their targets. The compounds are positively charged and are electrostatically attracted to the negatively charged phospholipids that tend to distinguish prokaryotic from eukaryotic cells.
