= Certified Senders Alliance =

- Founded: 2005
- Headquarters: Cologne, Germany
- Website: www.certified-senders.org

The Certified Senders Alliance is an email whitelist service provided by eco and the German Dialogmarketing Association (Deutscher Dialogmarketing Verband).

The CSA whitelist is a positive list for email bulk senders. With ISPs and email-providers participating in the whitelist, solicited email does not need to enter the ISPs' spamfilter any longer - the chances of false positives (legitimate email erroneously tagged as spam) are reduced. Bulk email senders can apply for certification for the whitelist. They have to comply with the admission criteria, such as Closed-loop authentication, providing Masthead, revocation and unsubscribe functions, a clear identity, having sole technological control of the servers used to send emails and more.

Applicants have to submit samples of their services, which prove that the CSA criteria have been implemented. They also have to pay a fee. Applications are reviewed by a certification committee. To date, more than 100 providers participate in the whitelist.

The CSA cooperates with eco's complaints office, where internet users can report breaches of the CSA criteria. The CSA frequently discloses, if members have breached the CSA criteria, or where excluded from the whitelist. Among the providers who have joined the CSA whitelist are: AOL, Arcor, Freenet, Host Europe Group, Microsoft, Vodafone Deutschland and Pironet, and the United Internet companies GMX, 1&1 Internet and web.de as well as Yahoo and Yandex.

Once a year, the CSA holds its congress "CSA Summit" where current legal requirements regarding email marketing are discussed, such as the General Data Protection Regulation as well as technical challenges and trends.
