= Child Maintenance and Enforcement Division =

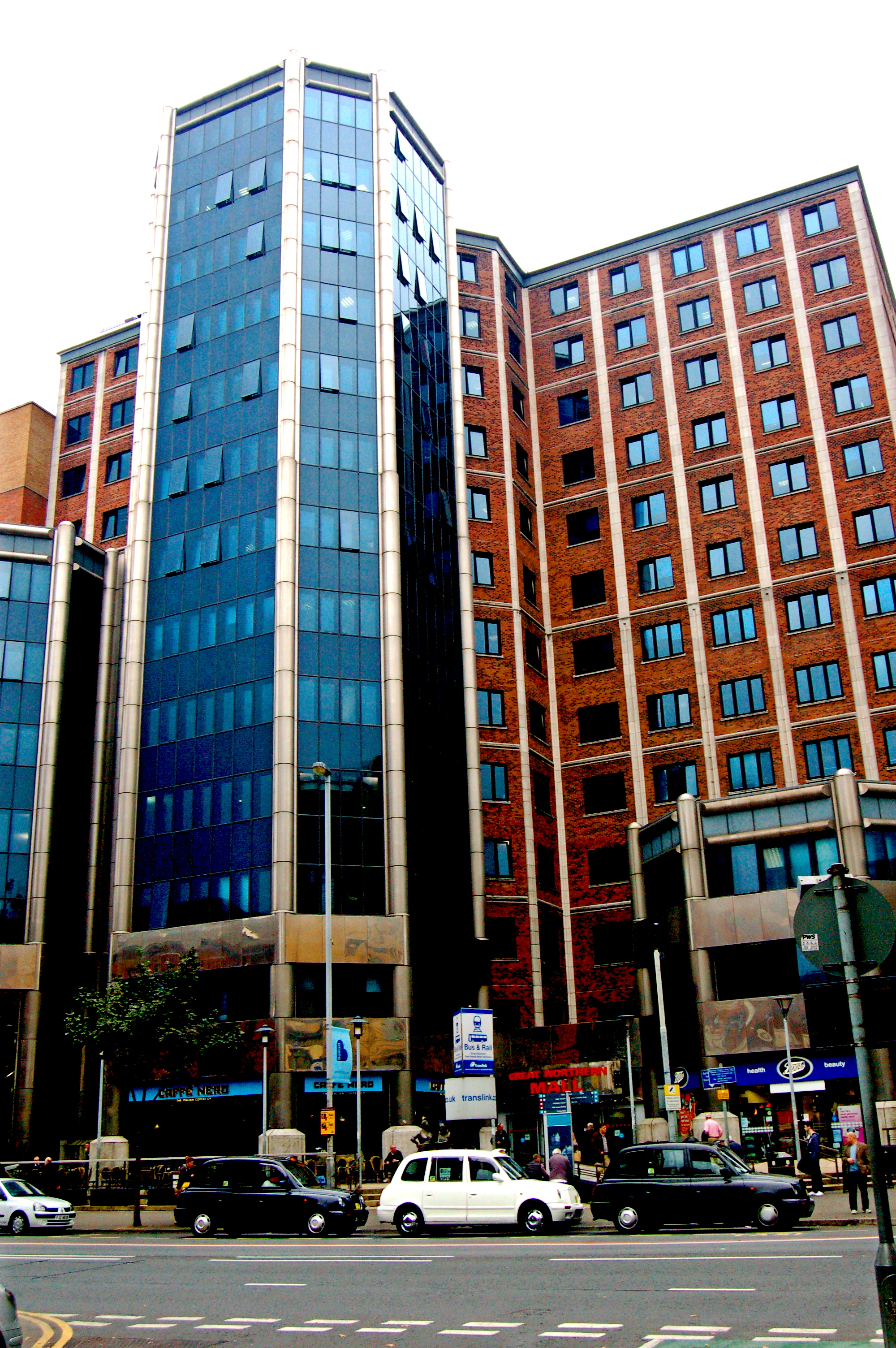
The Great Northern Tower, home of the Child Maintenance and Enforcement Division

The Child Maintenance and Enforcement Division (CMED), part of the Northern Ireland Department for Social Development, ensures that parents not living with their children continue to give them financial support. The agency began operating on 1 April 2008, replacing the Northern Ireland Child Support Agency which, according to Secretary of State for Work and Pensions John Hutton MP, was not working and needed to be replaced by a "smaller, more focused" body.

It aims to be simpler and more streamlined than its predecessor, to have a tougher enforcement system as well as to encourage parents to work out the payments on their own.

Its responsibilities will include the management of existing cases, the development and implementation of a new scheme, providing support and advice for parents involved in the scheme, the care of transitioning cases between schemes, and decommissioning the original CSA.

CMED is based at Great Northern Tower in Belfast city centre but also maintains a regional office in Omagh.
