= EpiCeram =

Topical non-steroidal skin cream

EpiCeram (EpiCeram Skin Barrier Emulsion) is a topical non-steroidal skin cream available and marketed within the United States. Based on the research of Peter M. Elias, it is made up of a ratio of 3 parts ceramides, 1 part free fatty acids, and 1 part cholesterol with a controlled release mechanism. It is designed to treat atopic dermatitis, a type of eczema.

EpiCeram was originally patented in June 1993, but its patent ultimately expired in July 2014. As a result, generic equivalents of the 3:1:1 formula are available globally, including Ceradan Skin Barrier Repair Cream in Southeast Asia, and Dr. Different 311 Moisturizer in South Korea. A similar competitor product with an active delivery agent, CeraVe moisturizer, is available over-the-counter in North America.

Ceragenix obtained marketing clearance from the U.S. Food and Drug Administration in April 2006. This prescription medical device works as a moisturizer and barrier cream. In the US, it requires prescription and was launched in October 2008 by Promius Pharma. EpiCeram was acquired by PuraCap Pharmaceutical LLC in 2010. As of January 2025, EpiCeram is exclusively marketed in the United States.

EpiCeram obtained Health Canada medical device license in September 2009 and was distributed by Pediapharm. It was sold under prescription in Canada as a Class II medical device until October 2018, when Health Canada revoked EpiCeram's authorization for sale in Canada.
