= Snowbird (person) =

Person who migrates from colder north to warmer south in Winter

A snowbird is a person who migrates from the colder northern parts of North America to warmer southern locales, typically during the winter. The southern locales include the Sun Belt and Hawaii in the United States, as well as Mexico and the Caribbean. Snowbirds used to primarily be retired or older, but are increasingly of all ages.

Conversely, a sunbird is one who leaves warmer locales in the summer, migrating to cooler locales such as higher elevations or higher latitude regions.

== Profile ==
Snowbirds are typically retirees who wish to avoid the snow and cold temperatures of northern winter, but maintain ties with family and friends by staying there the rest of the year. In recent years, younger people with jobs tied to seasonal tourists often migrate southward, following the tourist season, to southern resorts. Some are also business owners who have a second home in a warmer location or whose business can be easily moved from place to place. Many families in the United States often spend their Christmas holiday time (up to 2 weeks) at beach resorts in Florida, California, Hawaii, and Puerto Rico. Some are people who suffer from seasonal affective disorder who wish to enjoy the longer daylight hours in the southern latitudes in winter. Some snowbirds bring their homes with them, as campers (mounted on bus or truck frames) or as boats following the East Coast Intracoastal Waterway southward.

== RVers ==
A significant portion of the snowbird community is made up of recreational vehicle users (RVers). Many own a motorhome for the sole purpose of traveling south in the winter. Often they go to the same location every year and consider the other RVers that do the same a "second family". Many RV parks label themselves "snowbird friendly" and get the majority of their income from the influx of RVing snowbirds. Several areas in Florida and Arizona have large RV communities that appear and disappear seasonally. Quartzsite, Arizona, has been labeled "white city", because from a bird's-eye view all the motorhomes cover the landscape in white and then in the summer are gone. While historically Florida and Arizona have been the top RV snowbird locations, other southern U.S. states are experiencing a boom from snowbirds enjoying desert and tropical climates.

== Legal status ==
Many American snowbirds also declare permanent residency in low- or no-tax income tax states such as Florida rather than pay income taxes in the states they originally resided in full-time. By contrast, Canadian snowbirds usually retain residency in Canada in order to retain health benefits. Due to the implementation of the Patient Protection and Affordable Care Act there are now additional implications for Canadian snowbirds in the United States.

== See also ==
- Auto Train – a popular Amtrak train route for snowbirds during the winter months
- Canadian Snowbird Association
- Canadians of convenience
- Coachella Valley – a major destination in the desert of California for snowbirds and part-time residents from Canada and the Pacific Northwest
- Prior Smith – host of Canada Calling, a longtime syndicated radio broadcast for Canadian snowbirds in the U.S. and Bahamas
- RV lifestyle
- Seasonal human migration
- Summer house
