= 2020–21 Cupa României preliminary round =

2020-21 Cupa României
Cupa României Timișoreana

Tournament details
- Country: Romania

The 2020–21 Cupa României preliminary rounds make up the qualifying competition to decide which teams take part in the main competition from first round . This is the 83rd season of the most prestigious football cup competition of Romania.

The qualifying rounds took place between August 2019 and June 2020.

== First round ==
=== Alba ===
These matches played on 25 August 2019. First-round results: Alba

Tie no	Home team (tier)	Score	Away team (tier)
1.	AS Limbenii Limba (5)	7–2	CS Cuprirom Abrud (5)
2.	AS Pănade (5)	0–3	AS Viitorul Biia (5)
3.	AFC Lopadea Nouă (5)	2–2 (1–3 p)	AS Șoimii Ciumbrud (5)
4.	ACS Crăciunel (5)	?–?	AS Dacia Mihalț (5)
5.	CS Gloria Cricău 2019 (5)	5–0	CS Voința Teiuș (5)
6.	AFC Viitorul Răhău (5)	2–2 (3–4 p)	AS Hidromecanica Șugag (5)
7.	CS Progresul Fărău (5)	0–3	ACS Băgău (5)
8.	AS Euro Șpring (5)	6–2	AS Inter Ciugud (5)
9.	AS Sportul Livezile (5)	4–2	AS Mureșul Gâmbaș (5)
10.	AS Voința Beldiu (5)	1–1 (3–5 p)	CS Rapid CFR Teiuș (5)
11.	CS Spicul Bucerdea (5)	1–8	AS Târnavele Tiur (5)
12.	AS Gaz Metan Valea Lungă (5)	3–2	AS Tineretul Șona (5)

- CS Arieșul Apuseni Baia de Arieș qualified direct in 2nd Round.

=== Arad ===
These matches played on 10 and 11 August 2019. First-round results: Arad

Tie no	Home team (tier)	Score	Away team (tier)
1.	CS Voinţa Mailat (6A)	1–3	ACS Olimpia Bujac (5A)
2.	AS Victoria Berechiu (6B)	5–7	ACS Villa Gurba 1213 (5B)
3.	CS Progresul Dieci (6B)	3–2	ACS Cetatea Dezna (5B)
4.	FC Spicul Olari (5B)	1–4	FC Sîntana 2016 (5B)
5.	CS Academia Brosovszky Arad (5A)	6–0	ACS Aqua Vest Arad (5A)
6.	CS Șoimii Livada (5A)	2–3	ACS Podgoria Șiria (5B)
7.	CS Unirea Gurahonţ (5B)	2–5	AS Crişul Alb Buteni (5B)
8.	CS Viitorul Șepreuș (5B)	7–1	CS Viitorul Satu Nou (5B)
9.	CS Mureșana Mândruloc (6A)	1–18	CS Podgoria Ghioroc (5B)
10.	AS Sporting Șagu (6A)	2–0	CS Aluniș (5A)
11.	CS Recolta Apateu (6B)	1–2	CS Olimpia Bocsig (5B)
12.	FC Zimandu Nou (5B)	1–6	CS Avântul Târnova (5B)
13.	CS Unirea Șeitin (5A)	2–1	CS Gloria Secusigiu (5A)
14.	AS Voința Zărand (6A)	5–4	CSC Victoria Seleuș (5B)
15.	ACS Voința Sintea Mare (6B)	4–1	AS Flacăra Țipar (5B)
16.	ACS Viitorul Arad (5A)	7–4	AS Înfrățirea Iratoșu (5A)
17.	CS Dorobanți (6A)	2–5	CS Viitorul Pereg (5A)
18.	CS Foresta Oil Sânpetru German (5A)	3–4	ACS Mureșul Zădăreni (5A)
19.	CS Luceafărul Munar (5A)	0–5	CS Semlecana Semlac (5A)
20.	CS Voința Macea (5A)	3–1	FC Frontiera Pilu (5B)

=== Argeș ===
These matches played on 19 September 2019. First-round results: Argeș

Tie no	Home team (tier)	Score	Away team (tier)
1.	ACS Miroşi (5-South)	11–0	AS Căldăraru (5-South)
2.	AS Popești (5-South)	1–4	AS Izvoru (5-South)
3.	AS Viitorul Ștefan cel Mare (5-South)	3–2	ACS Slobozia 2018 (5-South)
4.	AS Viitorul Bîrla (5-South)	2–1	AS Unirea Hârseşti (5-South)
5.	ACS Energia Stolnici (5-South)	4–0	AS Speranța Cornățel (5-South)
6.	CS Albota 2012 (5-Center)	4–5	ACS Lunca Corbului 2000 (5-South)
7.	ACS Speed Academy Pitești (5-Center)	1–3	ACS Oarja (5-Center)
8.	AS Rătești (5-South)	1–0	CSC Căteasca (5-Center)
9.	AS Flacăra Leordeni (5-Center)	4–1	AS Stejarii Beleți Negrești (5-Center)
10.	AS Unirea Călinești (5-Center)	5–5 (6–7 p)	CS Dacia Ștefănești (5-Center)
11.	AS Unirea Tricolor Șerbănești (5-South)	1–3	ACS Steaua Negrași (5-South)
12.	AS Rapid Davidești (5-Center)	5–2	AS Micești 2002 (5-Center)
13.	ACS Vulturii Vulturești (5-North)	3–4	AS Voința Țițești (5-North)
14.	AS Drăganu (5-Center)	1–0	AS Musăteşti (5-Center)
15.	FC Star Sport Argeș SA (5-Center)	6–1	AS Deportivo Mălureni (5-Center)
16.	AS Ciofrângeni (5-Center)	1–2	AS Șoimii Tigveni (5-Center)
17.	CS Domnești (5-North)	3–2	ACS FC Corbi (5-North)
18.	AS Inter Aninoasa (5-North)	1–3	AS Partizanul Vlădești (5-North)
19.	AS Godeni (5-North)	6–2	AS Schitu Golești (5-North)
20.	AS Contabilitate Stoenești (5-North)	2–1	AS Cetățeni (5-North)
21.	AS Petrolul Hîrtiești (5-North)	2–1	AS Flacăra Boteni (5-North)
22.	AS Dragoslavele (5-North)	0–2	AS Cimentul Valea Mare Pravăț (5-North)
23.	AS Lerești (5-North)	6–0	AS Unirea Bughea de Jos (5-North)

=== Bacău ===
These matches played on 22–23 February 2020. First-round results: Bacău

Tie no	Home team (tier)	Score	Away team (tier)
1.	AS Flamura Roșie Sascut (4-Bacău)	3–0 w/o^{1}	ACS Gauss Bacău (4-Bacău)
2.	AS Bradul Mănăstirea Cașin (4-Valea Trotușului)	2–4	CS UZU Dărmăneşti (4-Valea Trotușului)
3.	AS Căiuți (4-Valea Trotușului)	4–2	AS Măgura Cașin (4-Valea Trotușului)
4.	AS Rapid Bacău (4-Bacău)	1–2	CSM Moinești (4-Valea Trotușului)
5.	AS Viitorul Urechești (4-Valea Trotușului)	0–3	AS Bârsănești (4-Valea Trotușului)
6.	AS Siretul Bacău (4-Bacău)	2–0	AS Negri (4-Bacău)

- Note 1 - (result decided at the "green table" - the players of the team from Bacău did not have the medical visa applied on the identification cards).
- Did not play in this round: FC Dinamo Bacău, AS Voinţa Gârleni, AS Filipești, AFCS Viitorul Curița, AS Voința Oituz, AS Vulturul Măgirești.
- Qualified direct in 2nd Round: CS Faraoani, ACS Viitorul Nicolae Bălcescu, ACS Gloria Zemeș.

=== Bihor ===
These matches played on 10–11 August 2019. First-round results: Bihor

Tie no	Home team (tier)	Score	Away team (tier)
1.	ACS Toldy Sânnicolau de Munte (5-Serie 1)	0–3 w/o	CS Voinţa Cheresig (5-Serie 1)
2.	AS Gloria Beiuș (5-Serie 2)	3–1	CS Gloria Căbeşti (5-Serie 2)
3.	Victoria Avram Iancu (5-Serie 2)	1–2	ACS Voința Ciumeghiu (5-Serie 2)
4.	Inter Aştileu (5-Serie 1)	0–5	AS Vadu Crișului (5-Serie 1)
5.	FC Minerul Şuncuiuş (5-Serie 1)	1–0	CSC Viitorul Bratca (5-Serie 1)
6.	ACS Viitorul Batăr (5-Serie 2)	4–2	ACS Victoria Tulca (5-Serie 2)
7.	Izvorul Cociuba Mare (5-Serie 2)	3–0	Vulturul Dobreşti (5-Serie 2)

- From 5th League, Serie 1 qualified direct in 2nd Round: Voinţa Suplac, Cetatea Biharia, ACS CAO 1910 Oradea, Locadin Ţeţchea, ACS Slovan Valea Cerului.
- From 5th League, Serie 2 qualified direct in 2nd Round: Unirea Roşia, AS Zorile Buntești, Biharea Marmogranit Vaşcău, Viitorul Tărian, Vida Pomezeu.

=== Bistrița-Năsăud ===
These matches played on 5 April 2020. First-round results: Bistrița-Năsăud

Tie no	Home team (tier)	Score	Away team (tier)
1.	Bye	–	CS Silvicultorul Maieru (4-North)
2.	AS Someșul Reteag (5)	–	ACS Hebe Sîngeorz Băi (4-North)
3.	Bye	–	ACS Heniu Leşu (4-North)
4.	AS Archiud (5)	–	ACS Voinţa Mărişelu (4-South)
5.	AS Venus Negrileşti (5)	–	ASFC Real Teaca (4-South)
6.	Bye	–	AS Unirea Bozieș (5)
7.	Bye	–	CS Minerul Rodna (4-North)
8.	AS Vulturul Arcalia (5)	–	AS Progresul Taure (4-South)
9.	AS Unirea Urmeniș (5)	–	AS Săgeata Dumbrăviţa (4-South)
10.	AS Voința Dipșa (5)	–	CS Someşul Rebrişoara (4-North)
11.	Bye	–	AS Voinţa Livezile (4-South)
12.	Bye	–	AS Someşul Feldru 1954 (4-North)
13.	AS Voinţa Matei (5)	–	AS Spicul Salva (4-North)
14.	Bye	–	CS Progresul Năsăud (4-South)
15.	Bye	–	ACS Atletico Monor (4-South)
16.	AS Unirea Ciceu Giurgeşti (5)	–	ACS Eciro Forest Telciu (4-North)

=== Botoșani ===
These matches played on 3 November 2019. First-round results: Botoșani

Tie no	Home team (tier)	Score	Away team (tier)
1.	CS Prutul Mitoc (5-North)	1–4	Azurii 92 Mileanca (5-North)
2.	ACS Sporting Dărăbani (5-North)	1–4	AS Real Hudești (5-North)
3.	FC Dobârceni (5-South)	4–3	ACS Unirea Stăuceni (5-South)
4.	AS Nord Star Pomârla (5-North)	4–2	Speranța Dumbrăvița (4-North)
5.	AS Columna Roma (5-South)	2–0	AS Luceafărul Vorona (5-South)
6.	Victoria Hlipiceni (5-South)	3–0	FC Suliţa (5-South)
7.	FC Viitorul Borzești (5-South)	5–1	CS Vorniceni (5-North)
8.	FC Viitorul Gorbăneşti (5-South)	3–0	Spicul Iacobeni (5-South)

=== Brașov ===
==== Brașov zone ====
These matches is preliminary rounds for matches with teams from 4th League and was played on 25 August 2019. First-round results: Brașov zone

Tie no	Home team (tier)	Score	Away team (tier)
1.	AS Vulcan 2008 (5-Brașov)	4–0	ASAC Internațional Brașov (5-Brașov)
2.	ACS Hălchiu (5-Brașov)	2–6	AS Bucegi Moieciu (5-Brașov)
3.	ACS Hoghiz (5-Brașov)	2–3	AS Cetatea Apaţa 2001 (5-Brașov)
4.	FC Energia Unirea Feldioara (5-Brașov)	3–0	AS Recolta Budila (5-Brașov)

==== Făgăraș zone ====
These matches is preliminary rounds for matches with teams from 4th League and was played on 25 August 2019. First-round results: Făgăraș zone East Serie

Tie no	Home team (tier)	Score	Away team (tier)
1.	AS Luceafărul Mărgineni (5-Făgăraș-East)	1–3	ACS Partizan Ileni (5-Făgăraș-East)
2.	AS Clăbucet Nord Sebeș (5-Făgăraș-East)	11–3	AS Șercăiana Șercaia (5-Făgăraș-East)
3.	AS Mândra (5-Făgăraș-East)	1–2	AS Poiana Mărului (5-Făgăraș-East)
4.	AS Bradul Şinca (5-Făgăraș-East)	3–0	AS Transilvania Felmer (5-Făgăraș-East)
5.	AS Dacia Copăcel (5-Făgăraș-East)	2–12	ACS Unirea Făgăraș (5-Făgăraș-East)

These matches is preliminary rounds for matches with teams from 4th League and was played on 25 and 28 August 2019. First-round results: Făgăraș zone West Serie

Tie no	Home team (tier)	Score	Away team (tier)
1.	AS Beclereana Beclean (5-Făgăraș-West)	–	Bye
2.	AS Ileni (5-Făgăraș-West)	Postponed	AS Progresul Voivodeni (5-Făgăraș-West)
3.	AS Săgeata Drăguş (5-Făgăraș-West)	5–3	AS Cetatea Breaza (5-Făgăraș-West)
4.	AS Viitorul Recea (5-Făgăraș-West)	4–3	AS Olimpia Săsciori (5-Făgăraș-West)
5.	AS Spartanii Pojorta (5-Făgăraș-West)	1–4	ACS Voinţa Hurez (5-Făgăraș-West)
6.	ASC Viştea Mare (5-Făgăraș-West)	3–3 (a.e.t.) (7–6 p)	AS Carpaţi Ucea (5-Făgăraș-West)
7.	AS Benelux Cincu (5-Făgăraș-West)	1–2 (a.e.t.)	FS Voila (5-Făgăraș-West)

=== Brăila ===
These matches played on 17 and 18 August 2019. First-round results: Brăila

Tie no	Home team (tier)	Score	Away team (tier)
1.	AS Avântul Mircea Vodă (5-Serie II)	1–3	AS Victoria Deduleşti (5-Serie II)
2.	FC Tufeşti (5-Serie I)	4–1	AS Stanriz Stăncuța (5-Serie I)
3.	ACS Comunal Cazasu II (5-Serie I)	3–0	AFC Urleasca (5-Serie I)
4.	AS Voința Racovița (5-Serie II)	4–2	ACS Unirea Gradiștea (5-Serie II)
5.	ACS Dunărea Tichilești (5-Serie I)	1–4	ACS Romgal Romanu (5-Serie I)
6.	ACS Gloria Movila Miresii (5-Serie I)	3–2	ACS Speranța Măxineni (5-Serie I)
7.	CS Victoria Traian II (5-Serie I)	11–3	AS Siretul Vădeni (5-Serie I)
8.	CS Dunărea Gropeni (5-Serie I)	4–6	AS Tricolorul Lanurile (5-Serie I)
9.	ACS Bordei Verde (5-Serie II)	2–3	AS Tractorul Viziru (5-Serie II)
10.	AS Viitorul Cireşu (5-Serie II)	3–0	AS Ulmu (5-Serie II)
11.	ACS Daous Dava 2018 Brăila (5-Serie I)	4–3	FC Dinamo Măxineni (5-Serie I)
12.	FC Voinţa Surdila Găiseanca (5-Serie II)	3–0	AS Spicul Zăvoaia (5-Serie II)
13.	AS Spicul Râmnicelu (5-Serie I)	1–2	AS Înfrățirea Gemenele (5-Serie I)
14.	AS Jirlău (5-Serie II)	1–2	AS Voinţa Făurei Sat (5-Serie II)
15.	AS Comagrim Dudești (5-Serie II)	0–4	AFC Viitorul Galbenu (5-Serie II)

=== Bucharest ===
These matches played on 17 September 2019. First-round results: Bucharest

Tie no	Home team (tier)	Score	Away team (tier)
1.	CSA Steaua București (4)	–	Bye
2.	ACS Sport Team (5-Serie 2)	2–4	ACS Tracțiunea (5-Serie 1)
3.	ACS Electrica (4)	1–5	AFC Rapid (4)
4.	ACS Ajax Noua Generație (5-Serie 1)	0–13	AFC Asalt (4)
5.	CS Aspol București (5-Serie 2)	2–6	ACS Unirea Politehnica (4)
6.	ACS Viitorul Bucureștii Noi (5-Serie 1)	3–6	AS Romprim (4)
7.	CS Inter Galaxy (5-Serie 2)	5–0	AFC Atletico București 2003 (5-Serie 1)
8.	CS FC Dinamo (4)	–	Bye
9.	CS Milanneto (5-Serie 1)	0–3	ACS Bucharest United (4)
10.	ACS Royal Borussia București (5-Serie 1)	2–5	ACS Sportivii București (4)
11.	AS FC Progresul București (5-Serie 2)	0–3	ACS Power Team (4)
12.	AS Venus București (5-Serie 1)	0–7	AFC Comprest GIM București (4)
13.	AS Metropolitan Estudiantes Fotbal Club (5-Serie 1)	3–10	ACS Victoria București (4)
14.	ACS Team Școala Mea (5-Serie 2)	3–2	ACS Rapid Frumoşii Nebuni ai Giuleştiului (4)
15.	AS Benfica Nova Geração (5-Serie 2)	2–7	ACS VK Soccer (5-Serie 1)
16.	Bye	–	CS Progresul București 2005 (4)

=== Buzău ===
These matches played on 1 September 2019. First-round results: Buzău

Tie no	Home team (tier)	Score	Away team (tier)
1.	AS Flamura Racovițeni (5-Serie 3)	1–7	AS Victoria Boboc (5-Serie 1)
2.	CS Viitorul 08 Verneşti (5-Serie 3)	0–4	AS Unirea Zoreşti (5-Serie 1)
3.	AS Voința Limpeziș (5-Serie 2)	2–3	AS Energia Clondiru (5-Serie 1)
4.	ASFC Glodeanu Siliștea (5-Serie 2)	1–3	AS Olimpia Pogoanele (5-Serie 2)
5.	AS Avântul Zărneşti (5-Serie 3)	2–6	AS Progresul Beceni (5-Serie 1)
6.	ACS Viitorul Bucureștii Noi (5-Serie 1)	3–6	AS Romprim (4)
7.	AS Viitorul Ştiubei (5-Serie 3)	4–0	AS Viitorul Valea Râmnicului (5-Serie 3)
8.	AS Avântul Murgeşti (5-Serie 3)	4–0	AS Victoria Grebănu (5-Serie 3)
9.	AS Viitorul Ruşeţu (5-Serie 2)	1–4	ACS Victoria Padina (5-Serie 2)
10.	AS Luceafărul Maxenu (5-Serie 2)	3–0	AS Tricolorul Gălbinaşi (5-Serie 2)
11.	AS Liceul Teoretic "Ştefan cel Mare" Râmnicu Sărat (5-Serie 3)	3–0	AS Voinţa Cochirleanca (5-Serie 3)
12.	AS Viticultorul Podgoria (5-Serie 3)	3–1	AS Vulturul Topliceni (5-Serie 3)
13.	AS Viitorul Tisău (5-Serie 1)	5–3	CS Carpați Nehoiu (5-Serie 1)
14.	AS Ştiinţa Cernăteşti (5-Serie 1)	3–2	AS Unirea Mărăcineni (5-Serie 2)
15.	AS Luceafărul CA Rosetti (5-Serie 2)	4–3	AS Pescăruşul Luciu (5-Serie 2)

=== Caraș-Severin ===
These matches played on 8 September 2019. First-round results: Caraș-Severin

Tie no	Home team (tier)	Score	Away team (tier)
1.	ACS Comorîşte (5)	Not played	ACS Viitorul Vrani (5)
2.	AS Voința Șoșdea (5)	7–3	ASFC Ramna 2000 (5)
3.	AS Granitul Surduc (5)	3–2	AS Recolta Rafnic (5)
4.	ACS Ciclova Română (5)	2–3	AS Voința Răcășdia (5)
5.	AS Intersport Măureni (5)	2–1	AS Șoimii Gherteniș (5)
6.	ACS 1955 Minerul Dognecea (5)	1–0	AS Banatul Ocna de Fier (5)

=== Călărași ===
These matches played on 27 and 28 July 2019. First-round results: Călărași

Tie no	Home team (tier)	Score	Away team (tier)
1.	AS Șoimii Unirea (5-Serie B)	1–8	AFC Atletico Unirea (5-Serie B)
2.	ACS Înainte Modelu II (5-Serie B)	3–5	AS Gâldău (5-Serie B)
3.	AFC Progresul Perișoru (5-Serie B)	2–1	AS Conpet 2006 Ștefan Cel Mare (4)
4.	ACS Zarea Cuza Vodă (5-Serie B)	0–3*	ACS Viitorul Dichiseni 2012 (5-Serie B)
5.	AS Viitorul Dragalina (5-Serie B)	1–0	AFC Viitorul Dragoș Vodă 2019 (5-Serie B)
6.	AS Speranța Dâlga (5-Serie B)	2–8	AS Avântul Dor Mărunt (5-Serie B)
7.	AS Atletico Nicolae Bălcescu (5-Serie B)	3–2	AS Dinamo Sărulești (5-Serie B)
8.	AFC Voința Chiselet (5-Serie A)	0–3	AS Unirea Spanțov (5-Serie A)
9.	AFC Viitorul Dorobanțu 2019 (5-Serie A)	3–0*	AS Avântul Luica (5-Serie A)
10.	AS Colinele Argeșului Mitreni (5-Serie A)	3–0*	AS Rapid Ulmeni (5-Serie A)
11.	AS Viitorul Sohatu (5-Serie A)	1–7	AFC Șoimii Progresu (5-Serie A)
12.	CS Budești (5-Serie A)	3–5	AS Lumina Frumușani (5-Serie A)
13.	Rapid Răzvani (5-Serie A)	0–3*	AS Vulturii Gălbinași (4)

- ACS Zarea Cuza Vodă (5-Serie B) walkover.
- AS Avântul Luica (5-Serie A) walkover.
- AS Rapid Ulmeni (5-Serie A) walkover.
- Rapid Răzvani (5-Serie A) walkover.

=== Cluj ===
==== Cluj zone ====
These matches is preliminary rounds for matches with teams from 4th League and was played on 18 and 19 September 2019. First-round results: Cluj zone

Tie no	Home team (tier)	Score	Away team (tier)
1.	AS Borșa (5-Cluj zone)	2–3	ACS Speranța Jucu (5-Cluj zone)
2.	AS Acvila Sânpaul (5-Cluj zone)	0–3 Awarded	AFC Progresul Vlaha (5-Cluj zone)
3.	A. Chinteni 2019 (5-Cluj zone)	3–1	AS Voința 2011 Pata (5-Cluj zone)
4.	AS Avântul Bradu 1970 Luna de Sus (5-Cluj zone)	4–1	ACS Academia de Fotbal Florești (5-Cluj zone)
5.	FC Someşul II Gilău (5-Cluj zone)	1–3	ACS Aghireșu (5-Cluj zone)
6.	AS AMEFA Cluj Napoca (5-Cluj zone)	1–0	AS Inter Dezmir (5-Cluj zone)
7.	AS Voința Sâncraiu (5-Cluj zone)	0–6	AS Viitorul Poieni (5-Cluj zone)

=== Dej zone ===
These matches is preliminary rounds for matches with teams from 4th League and was played on 24 and 25 August 2019. First-round results: Dej zone

Tie no	Home team (tier)	Score	Away team (tier)
1.	AS Energia Mănăstirea (5-Dej zone)	4–6	AS Viitorul Jichisu de Jos (5-Dej zone)
1.	AS Știința Câțcău (5-Dej zone)	3–3 (10–11 p)	AS Viitorul Răzbuneni (5-Dej zone)
3.	AS Someșul Cășeiu (5-Dej zone)	6–2	AS Minerul Ocna Dej (5-Dej zone)
4.	AS Cetatea Unguraș (5-Dej zone)	2–2 (6–7 p)	AS Progresul Cuzdrioara (5-Dej zone)
5.	ACS FC Someşul 2 Dej (5-Dej zone)	6–0	ACS Măgura Strâmbu (5-Dej zone)

=== Mociu zone ===
These matches is preliminary rounds for matches with teams from 4th League and was played on 4 August 2019. First-round results: Mociu zone

Tie no	Home team (tier)	Score	Away team (tier)
1.	ACS Lucefărul Ghiriș (5-Mociu zone)	5–4	AS Gloria Berchieşu (5-Mociu zone)
2.	AS Unirea Cămărașu (5-Mociu zone)	2–4	AS Viitorul Dezmir (5-Mociu zone)
3.	AS Meteor Mociu (5-Mociu zone)	4–1	AS SUDINOX Vișea (5-Mociu zone)
4.	ASF Înfrățirea Căianu (5-Mociu zone)	5–4	ACS Unirea Geaca (5-Mociu zone)
5.	ACS Gloria Cătina (5-Mociu zone)	8–4	AS Unirea 2 Gădălin (5-Mociu zone)
6.	ACS Viitorul 2014 Soporu de Câmpie (5-Mociu zone)	2–2 (6–5 p)	ACS Speranța Rromi 2016 Mociu (5-Mociu zone)

== Second round ==
=== Alba ===
These matches played on 22 September 2019. Second Round Results: Alba

Tie no	Home team (tier)	Score	Away team (tier)
1.	ACS Crăciunel (5)	8–2	AS Viitorul Biia (5)
2.	AS Târnavele Tiur (5)	1–2	AS Gaz Metan Valea Lungă (5)
3.	AS Șoimii Ciumbrud (5)	2–5	ACS Băgău (5)
4.	CS Arieșul Apuseni Baia de Arieș (5)	1–2	AS Sportul Livezile (5)
5.	AS Euro Șpring (5)	0–4	AS Limbenii Limba (5)
6.	ACS Gloria Cricău 2019 (5)	4–2	CS Rapid CFR Teiuș (5)

- AS Hidromecanica Șugag qualified direct in 3rd Round.

=== Arad ===
These matches played on 28 August 2019. Second Round Results: Arad

Tie no	Home team (tier)	Score	Away team (tier)
1.	AS Voința Zărand (6A)	2–4	CS Victoria Felnac (4)
2.	AS Crişul Alb Buteni (5B)	3–6	CS Beliu (4)
3.	CS Unirea Șeitin (5A)	2–5	CS Glogovăț 2013 (4)
4.	ACS Villa Gurba 1213 (5B)	2–8	CS Ineu (4)
5.	CS Viitorul Șepreuș (5B)	2–8	CS Frontiera Curtici 2004 (4)
6.	ACS Voința Sintea Mare (6B)	1–6	CS Socodor (4)
7.	CS Viitorul Pereg (5A)	7–6	ACS Mureșul Zădăreni (5A)
8.	CS Voința Macea (5A)	3–8	CS Păulișana Păuliș (4)
9.	ACS Viitorul Arad (5A)	0–2	CS Victoria Zăbrani (4)
10.	ACS Olimpia Bujac (5A)	2–3	CS Podgoria Ghioroc (5B)
11.	CS Progresul Dieci (6B)	0–3	CS Șoimii Șimand (4)
12.	FC Sîntana 2016 (5B)	2–4	CS Podgoria Pâncota (4)
13.	CS Olimpia Bocsig (5B)	6–1	CS Semlecana Semlac (5A)
14.	ACS Podgoria Șiria (5B)	0–6	CS Unirea Sântana (4)
15.	CS Academia Brosovszky Arad (5A)	3–0	CS Speranța Turnu (4)
16.	AS Sporting Șagu (6A)	1–2	CS Avântul Târnova (5B)

=== Argeș ===
These matches played on 17 October 2019. Second Round Results: Argeș

Tie no	Home team (tier)	Score	Away team (tier)
1.	ACS Miroşi (5-South)	1–1 (6–5 p)	AS Viitorul Bîrla (5-South)
2.	AS Izvoru (5-South)	11–1	AS Viitorul Ștefan cel Mare (5-South)
3.	ACS Lunca Corbului 2000 (5-South)	3–6	ACS Energia Stolnici (5-South)
4.	AS Rătești (5-South)	1–4	AS Flacăra Leordeni (5-Center)
5.	CS Dacia Ștefănești (5-Center)	1–2	AS Drăganu (5-Center)
6.	AS Rapid Davidești (5-Center)	5–4	AS Petrolul Hîrtiești (5-North)
7.	AS Voința Țițești (5-North)	2–3	AS Partizanul Vlădești (5-North)
8.	CS Domnești (5-North)	2–2 (a.e.t.) (3–4 p)	AS Godeni (5-North)
9.	AS Contabilitate Stoenești (5-North)	0–7	AS Cimentul Valea Mare Pravăț (5-North)

- ACS Oarja (5-Center) is qualified direct in Third Round.
- ACS Steaua Negrași (5-South) is qualified direct in Third Round.
- FC Star Sport Argeș SA (5-Center) is qualified direct in Third Round.
- AS Șoimii Tigveni (5-Center) is qualified direct in Third Round.
- AS Lerești (5-North) is qualified direct in Third Round.

=== Bacău ===
These matches played on 29 February-1 March 2020. Second Round Results: Bacău

Tie no	Home team (tier)	Score	Away team (tier)
1.	AS Căiuți (4-Valea Trotușului)	3–0 w/o	AS Voinţa Oituz (4-Valea Trotușului)
2.	AS Flamura Roșie Sascut (4-Bacău)	0–3	AS Voinţa Gărleni (4-Bacău)
3.	CS Zorile Faraoani (4-Bacău)	2–3	ACS Viitorul Nicolae Bălcescu (4-Bacău)
4.	AS Bărsăneşti (4-Valea Trotușului)	1–6	FC Dinamo Bacău (4-Bacău)
5.	ACS Gloria Zemeş (4-Valea Trotușului)	2–1	AS Vulturul Măgireşti (4-Valea Trotușului)
6.	CSM Moineşti (4-Valea Trotușului)	2–3	CS UZU Dărmăneşti (4-Valea Trotușului)
7.	AS Siretul Bacău (4-Bacău)	2–1	AS Filipeşti (4-Bacău)

- AS Voinţa Oituz did not show up at the match.
- AFCS Viitorul Curiţa qualified direct in 3rd Round.

=== Bihor ===
These matches played on 15–18 August 2019. Second Round Results: Bihor

Tie no	Home team (tier)	Score	Away team (tier)
1.	Izvorul Cociuba Mare (5-Serie 2)	1–5	FC Universitatea Oradea (4)
2.	Voinţa Suplac (5-Serie 1)	3–1	CS Unirea Valea lui Mihai (4)
3.	Cetatea Biharia (5-Serie 1)	1–5	CS Viitorul Borş (4)
4.	ACS Slovan Valea Cerului (5-Serie 1)	1–4	CS Săcueni (4)
5.	AS Vadu Crișului (5-Serie 1)	2–1	CS Foresta Tileagd (4)
6.	Minerul Şuncuiuş (5-Serie 1)	6–5	Crişul Aleşd (4)
7.	ACS Voința Ciumeghiu (5-Serie 2)	1–2	CSM Olimpia Salonta (4)
8.	AS Gloria Beiuș (5-Serie 2)	3–2	CS Oșorhei (4)
9.	Voinţa Cheresig (5-Serie 1)	0–6	CSC Crişul Sântandrei (4)
10.	Locadin Ţeţchea (5-Serie 1)	1–14	Club Atletic Oradea (4)
11.	Biharea Marmogranit Vaşcău (5-Serie 2)	0–6	CSO Ştei (4)
12.	AS Zorile Buntești (5-Serie 2)	2–1	CS Bihorul Beiuş (4)
13.	Viitorul Tărian (5-Serie 2)	1–3	CS Diosig Bihardiószeg (4)
14.	Partizanul Sânnicolau Român (5-Serie 2)	1–4	Unirea Embrak Livada (4)
15.	Vida Pomezeu (5-Serie 2)	2–1	Unirea Roşia (5-Serie 2)
16.	ACS Viitorul Batăr (5-Serie 2)	1–4	CS Mădăras (4)

=== Botoșani ===
These matches played on 17 November 2019. Second Round Results: Botoșani

Tie no	Home team (tier)	Score	Away team (tier)
1.	AS Nord Star Pomârla (5-North)	4–1	AS Real Hudești (5-North)
2.	AS Columna Roma (5-South)	5–2	FC Dobârceni (5-South)
3.	FC Viitorul Gorbăneşti (5-South)	2–2 (a.e.t.) (4–5 p)	Victoria Hlipiceni (5-South)
4.	FC Viitorul Borzești (5-South)	2–3	Azurii 92 Mileanca (5-North)

=== Brașov ===
==== Brașov zone ====
These matches is preliminary rounds for matches with teams from 4th League and was played on 1 September 2019. Second Round Results: Brașov zone

Tie no	Home team (tier)	Score	Away team (tier)
1.	AS Cetatea Apaţa 2001 (5-Brașov)	4–3	AS Bucegi Moieciu (5-Brașov)
2.	AS Vulcan 2008 (5-Brașov)	2–0	FC Energia Unirea Feldioara (5-Brașov)

==== Făgăraș zone ====
These matches is preliminary rounds for matches with teams from 4th League and was played on 4 and 5 September 2019. Second Round Results: Făgăraș zone East Serie

Tie no	Home team (tier)	Score	Away team (tier)
1.	AS Poiana Mărului (5-Făgăraș-East)	–	Bye
2.	AS Clăbucet Nord Sebeș (5-Făgăraș-East)	1–4	AS Bradul Şinca (5-Făgăraș-East)
3.	ACS Partizan Ileni (5-Făgăraș-East)	4–1	ACS Unirea Făgăraș (5-Făgăraș-East)

These matches is preliminary rounds for matches with teams from 4th League and was played on 4 September 2019. Second Round Results: Făgăraș zone West Serie

Tie no	Home team (tier)	Score	Away team (tier)
1.	AS Săgeata Drăguş (5-Făgăraș-West)	–	Bye
2.	AS Ileni (5-Făgăraș-West)	0–0 (a.e.t.) (7–6 p)	AS Beclereana Beclean (5-Făgăraș-West)
3.	ASC Viştea Mare (5-Făgăraș-West)	2–1 (a.e.t.)	AS Viitorul Recea (5-Făgăraș-West)
4.	ACS Voinţa Hurez (5-Făgăraș-West)	0–3	FS Voila (5-Făgăraș-West)

=== Brăila ===
These matches played on 24 and 25 August 2019. Second Round Results: Brăila

Tie no	Home team (tier)	Score	Away team (tier)
1.	FC Voinţa Surdila Găiseanca (5-Serie II)	3–1	AS Victoria Deduleşti (5-Serie II)
2.	AS Viitorul Cireşu (5-Serie II)	2–0	AS Voinţa Bărăganul (5-Serie II)
3.	ACS Romgal Romanu (5-Serie I)	4–5	AS Înfrățirea Gemenele (5-Serie I)
4.	AFC Viitorul Galbenu (5-Serie II)	6–2	AS Voinţa Făurei Sat (5-Serie II)
5.	AS Tricolorul Lanurile (5-Serie I)	3–1	FC Tufeşti (5-Serie I)
6.	AS Tractorul Viziru (5-Serie II)	2–1	CS Victoria Traian II (5-Serie I)
7.	ACS Comunal Cazasu II (5-Serie I)	4–3	ACS Daous Dava 2018 Brăila (5-Serie I)
8.	ACS Gloria Movila Miresii (5-Serie I)	5–1	AS Voința Racovița (5-Serie II)

=== Bucharest ===
These matches played on 15 October 2019. Second Round Results: Bucharest

Tie no	Home team (tier)	Score	Away team (tier)
1.	CSA Steaua București (4)	24–0	ACS Tracțiunea (5-Serie 1)
2.	AFC Rapid (4)	1–2	AFC Asalt (4)
3.	ACS Unirea Politehnica (4)	4–2	AS Romprim (4)
4.	CS Inter Galaxy (5-Serie 2)	4–1	CS FC Dinamo (4)
5.	ACS Bucharest United (4)	13–0	ACS Sportivii București (4)
6.	ACS Power Team (4)	2–0	AFC Comprest GIM București (4)
7.	ACS Victoria București (4)	9–2	ACS Team Școala Mea (5-Serie 2)
8.	ACS VK Soccer (5-Serie 1)	2–9	CS Progresul București 2005 (4)

=== Buzău ===
These matches played on 24, 25 and 27 September 2019. Second Round Results: Buzău

Tie no	Home team (tier)	Score	Away team (tier)
1.	AS Liceul Teoretic "Ştefan cel Mare" Râmnicu Sărat (5-Serie 3)	2–6	CSM Râmnicu Sărat (4)
2.	AS Victoria Boboc (5-Serie 2)	2–4	CS Voinţa Lanurile (4)
3.	AS Unirea Zoreşti (5-Serie 1)	4–2	AS Săhăteni Vintileanca (4)
4.	AS Energia Clondiru (5-Serie 1)	0–5	AS Voința Limpeziș (4)
5.	AS Olimpia Pogoanele (5-Serie 2)	3–1	AS Unirea Stîlpu (4)
6.	AS Progresul Beceni (5-Serie 1)	2–1	ASFC Viitorul Berca (4)
7.	AS Viitorul Ştiubei (5-Serie 3)	3–5	AS Recolta Sălcioara (4)
8.	AS Avântul Murgeşti (5-Serie 3)	3–0	AS Înfrățirea Zoița (4)
9.	ACS Victoria Padina (5-Serie 2)	1–0	AS Diadema Gherăseni (4)
10.	AS Luceafărul Maxenu (5-Serie 2)	1–4	AS Gloria Vadu Paşii (4)
11.	AS Viticultorul Podgoria (5-Serie 3)	1–6	AS Avântul Zărnești (4)
12.	AS Viitorul Tisău (5-Serie 1)	3–0	AS Fortius-Partizanul Merei (4)
13.	AS Ştiinţa Cernăteşti (5-Serie 1)	1–4	ACS Locomotiva Buzău (4)
14.	AS Recolta Blăjani (4)	0–3 w/o	AS Phoenix Poșta Câlnău (4)
15.	AS Șoimii Siriu (4)	2–7	ACS Montana Pătârlagele (4)
16.	AS Luceafărul CA Rosetti (5-Serie 2)	4–6	ACS Team Săgeata (4)

=== Caraș-Severin ===
These matches played on 9 October 2019. Second Round Results: Caraș-Severin

Tie no	Home team (tier)	Score	Away team (tier)
1.	ACS 1955 Minerul Dognecea (5)	11–1	AS Voința Șoșdea (5)
2.	AS Granitul Surduc (5)	0–8	AS Intersport Măureni (5)
3.	ACS Comorîşte (5)	4–0	CSO Anina (4-Oravița zone)
4.	AS Voința Răcășdia (5)	3–0	ACS Nera Bozovici (4-Oravița zone)
5.	AS Era S Comexim Caransebeş (4-Caransebeş zone)	3–5	AS Foresta Armeniş (4-Caransebeş zone)
6.	AS Agmonia Zăvoi (4-Caransebeş zone)	3–7	FCS Bistra Glimboca (4-Caransebeş zone)
7.	AS AD Mediam Mehadia (4-Caransebeş zone)	5–1	AS Steaua 2018 Prigor (4-Caransebeş zone)
8.	AS Magica Caransebeş (4-Caransebeş zone)	5–4	AS Şoimii Oţelu Roşu 2015 (4-Caransebeş zone)

=== Călărași ===
These matches played on 18 and 25 September 2019. Second Round Results: Călărași

Tie no	Home team (tier)	Score	Away team (tier)
1.	AS Colinele Argeșului Mitreni (5-Serie A)	0–3*	CSM Oltenița (4)
2.	AS Avântul Dor Mărunt (5-Serie B)	0–3*	CS Venus Independenţa (4)
3.	ACS Viitorul Dichiseni 2012 (5-Serie B)	6–3	ACS Tricolorul Jegălia (4)
4.	AS Viitorul Dragalina (5-Serie B)	3–4	AFC Progresul Fundulea (4)
5.	AFC Progresul Perișoru (5-Serie B)	0–5	ACS Dunărea Grădiștea (4)
6.	AFC Atletico Unirea (5-Serie B)	3–4	AFC Dunărea Ciocănești (4)
7.	AS Petrolul Ileana (4)	3–2	FC Victoria Lehliu (4)
8.	AS Gâldău (5-Serie B)	4–2	AS Unirea Dragalina (4)
9.	AFC Viitorul Dorobanțu 2019 (5-Serie A)	1–2	AFC Unirea Mânăstirea (4)
10.	AS Lumina Frumușani (4)	0–3*	CS Viitorul Curcani (4)
11.	AS Unirea Spanțov (5-Serie A)	2–6	CS Victoria Chirnogi (4)
12.	AS Vulturii Gălbinași (4)	3–0	FC 2006 Partizan Crivăț (4)
13.	AFC Șoimii Progresu (5-Serie A)	3–0*	AFC Steaua Radovanu (4)
14.	AS Atletico Nicolae Bălcescu	2–3	AS Spicul Vâlcelele (4)

- AS Colinele Argeșului Mitreni (5-Serie A)) walkover.
- AS Avântul Dor Mărunt (5-Serie B) walkover.
- AS Lumina Frumușani (4) walkover.
- AFC Steaua Radovanu (4) walkover.

== Third round ==
=== Alba ===
These matches played on 16 October 2019. Third Round Results: Alba

Tie no	Home team (tier)	Score	Away team (tier)
1.	AS Hidromecanica Șugag (5)	4–4 (3–1 p)	AS Energia Săsciori (4)
2.	ACS Gloria 2019 Cricău (5)	1–3	ACS Performanța Ighiu (4)
3.	ACS Crăciunel (5)	2–5	AS Gaz Metan Valea Lungă (5)
4.	ACS Băgău (5)	3–2	CS Inter Unirea (4)
5.	AS Sportul Livezile (5)	0–5	CS Universitatea Alba Iulia (4)
6.	AS Limbenii Limba (5)	1–2	CS Navobi Alba Iulia (4)

=== Arad ===
These matches played on 18 September 2019. Third Round Results: Arad

Tie no	Home team (tier)	Score	Away team (tier)
1.	CS Academia Brosovszky Arad (5A)	0–3	CS Frontiera Curtici 2004 (4)
2.	CS Avântul Târnova (5B)	2–7	CS Păulișana Păuliș (4)
3.	CS Victoria Felnac (4)	0–4	CS Ineu (4)
4.	CS Podgoria Ghioroc (5B)	3–4	CS Șoimii Șimand (4)
5.	CS Beliu (4)	2–1	CS Victoria Zăbrani (4)
6.	CS Podgoria Pâncota (4)	0–1	CS Glogovăț 2013 (4)
7.	CS Olimpia Bocsig (5B)	0–4	CS Unirea Sântana (4)
8.	CS Viitorul Pereg (5A)	0–2	CS Socodor (4)

=== Argeș ===
These matches played on 17 October 2019. Third Round Results: Argeș

Tie no	Home team (tier)	Score	Away team (tier)
1.	ACS Miroşi (5-South)	2–8	ACS Recea (4)
2.	AS Izvoru (5-South)	2–3	ACS Victoria Buzoiești (4)
3.	ACS Energia Stolnici (5-South)	3–1	ACS Costeşti (4)
4.	AS Flacăra Leordeni (5-Center)	3–3 (a.e.t.) (4–5 p)	ACS Vulturii Priboieni 2017 (4)
5.	AS Drăganu (5-Center)	2–4	AS Juventus Bascov (4)
6.	AS Rapid Davidești (5-Center)	1–5	AS Colibași (4)
7.	AS Partizanul Vlădești (5-North)	5–3	ACS Gloria Berevoești (4)
8.	AS Godeni (5-North)	1–3	ACS Voinţa Budeasa (4)
9.	AS Cimentul Valea Mare Pravăț (5-North)	3–0 w/o	CS Rucar (4)
10.	ACS Oarja (5-Center)	2–0	CS DLR Piteşti (4)
11.	ACS Steaua Negrași (5-South)	9–2	CSC Suseni (4)
12.	FC Star Sport Argeș SA (5-Center)	1–3	CS Sporting Piteşti (4)
13.	AS Șoimii Tigveni (5-Center)	3–0	ACS Basarabi Curtea de Argeș (4)
14.	AS Lerești (5-North)	2–1	ACS Muscelul Câmpulung (4)
15.	AS FC Aripi Piteşti 2017 (4)	0–8	CS Real Bradu (4)
16.	ACS FC Dănuţ Coman (4)	2–7	ACS Poiana Lacului (4)

- CS Rucar did not present the players' cards.

=== Bihor ===
These matches played on 4 September 2019. Third Round Results: Bihor

Tie no	Home team (tier)	Score	Away team (tier)
1.	AS Zorile Buntești (5-Serie 2)	6–4	CSO Ştei (4)
2.	AS Gloria Beiuș (5-Serie 2)	6–0	CSM Olimpia Salonta (4)
3.	CS Mădăras (4)	4–7	Unirea Embrak Livada (4)
4.	CS Diosig Bihardiószeg (4)	1–4	CSC Crişul Sântandrei (4)
5.	Voinţa Suplac (5-Serie 1)	2–4	CS Săcueni (4)
6.	AS Vadu Crișului (5-Serie 1)	0–1	CS Viitorul Borş (4)
7.	Minerul Şuncuiuş (5-Serie 1)	0–2	Club Atletic Oradea (4)
8.	Vida Pomezeu (5-Serie 2)	1–2	FC Universitatea Oradea (4)

=== Botoșani ===
These matches played on 23 November and 1 December 2019. Third Round Results: Botoșani

Tie no	Home team (tier)	Score	Away team (tier)
1.	AS Nord Star Pomârla (5-North)	4–1	Azurii 92 Mileanca (5-North)
2.	AS Columna Roma (5-South)	3–0	Victoria Hlipiceni (5-South)

=== Brașov ===
==== Brașov zone ====
These matches is preliminary rounds for matches with teams from 4th League and was played on 2 October 2019. Third Round Results: Brașov zone

Tie no	Home team (tier)	Score	Away team (tier)
1.	AS Cetatea Apaţa 2001 (5-Brașov)	2–1	AS Vulcan 2008 (5-Brașov)

==== Făgăraș zone ====
These matches is preliminary rounds for matches with teams from 4th League and was played on 19 September 2019. Third Round Results: Făgăraș zone East Serie

Tie no	Home team (tier)	Score	Away team (tier)
1.	AS Bradul Şinca (5-Făgăraș-East)	–	Bye
2.	ACS Partizan Ileni (5-Făgăraș-East)	3–3 (a.e.t.) (3–5 p)	AS Poiana Mărului (5-Făgăraș-East)

These matches is preliminary rounds for matches with teams from 4th League and was played on 18 September 2019. Third Round Results: Făgăraș zone West Serie

Tie no	Home team (tier)	Score	Away team (tier)
1.	AS Săgeata Drăguş (5-Făgăraș-West)	2–1	ASC Viştea Mare (5-Făgăraș-West)
2.	AS Ileni (5-Făgăraș-West)	0–3	FS Voila (5-Făgăraș-West)

=== Brăila ===
These matches will be played in 2020. Third Round Results: Brăila

Tie no	Home team (tier)	Score	Away team (tier)
1.	ACS Gloria Movila Miresii (5-Serie I)	–	ACS Comunal Cazasu II (5-Serie I)
2.	FC Voinţa Surdila Găiseanca (5-Serie II)	–	AFC Viitorul Galbenu (5-Serie II)
3.	AS Viitorul Cireşu (5-Serie II)	–	AS Tractorul Viziru (5-Serie II)

=== Bucharest ===
These matches played on 3 December 2019. Third Round Results: Bucharest

Tie no	Home team (tier)	Score	Away team (tier)
1.	CSA Steaua București (4)	9–0	AFC Asalt (4)
2.	CS Inter Galaxy (5-Serie 2)	2–5	ACS Unirea Politehnica (4)
3.	ACS Power Team (4)	0–3	ACS Bucharest United (4)
4.	CS Progresul București 2005 (4)	13–2	ACS Victoria București (4)

=== Buzău ===
These matches were played in 2020. Third Round Results: Buzău

Tie no	Home team (tier)	Score	Away team (tier)
1.	AS Phoenix Poșta Câlnău (4)	–	AS Recolta Sălcioara (4)
2.	AS Unirea Zoreşti (5-Serie 1)	–	AS Avântul Zărnești (4)
3.	AS Olimpia Pogoanele (5-Serie 2)	–	AS Gloria Vadu Paşii (4)
4.	AS Progresul Beceni (5-Serie 1)	–	ACS Montana Pătârlagele (4)
5.	AS Avântul Murgeşti (5-Serie 3)	–	CS Voința Lanurile (4)
6.	ACS Victoria Padina (5-Serie 2)	–	AS Voința Limpeziș (4)
7.	AS Viitorul Tisău (5-Serie 1)	–	ACS Team Săgeata (4)
8.	ACS Locomotiva Buzău (4)	–	CSM Râmnicu Sărat (4)

=== Caraș-Severin ===
These matches played on 6 November 2019 and 8 March 2020. Third Round Results: Caraș-Severin

Tie no	Home team (tier)	Score	Away team (tier)
1.	AS Intersport Măureni (5)	7–4	AS Metalul Bocşa (4-Oravița zone)
2.	ACS Comorîşte (5)	7–1	AS Croaţia Clocotici (4-Oravița zone)
3.	FCS Bistra Glimboca (4-Caransebeş zone)	1–2	ACS Rapid Buchin (4-Caransebeş zone)
4.	AS Foresta Armeniş (4-Caransebeş zone)	0–3	AS AD Mediam Mehadia (4-Caransebeş zone)
5.	AS Magica Caransebeş (4-Caransebeş zone)	2–7	ACS 2017 Slatina-Timiş (4-Caransebeş zone)
6.	ACS 1955 Minerul Dognecea (5)	2–4	AFC Voinţa Lupac (4-Oravița zone)
7.	CS Oravița (4-Oravița zone)	3–1	CS Moldova Nouă (4-Oravița zone)
8.	AS Voința Răcășdia (5)	0–5	ACS Progresul Ezeriș (4-Oravița zone)

=== Călărași ===
These matches played on 7 December 2019. Third Round Results: Călărași

Tie no	Home team (tier)	Score	Away team (tier)
1.	AS Vulturii Gălbinași (4)	0–10	CSM Oltenița (4)
2.	ACS Zarea Cuza Vodă (5-Serie B)	0–3	CS Venus Independenţa (4)
3.	AFC Progresul Fundulea (4)	0–3	AFC Dunărea Ciocănești (4)
4.	AS Petrolul Ileana (4)	6–2	ACS Dunărea Grădiștea (4)
5.	AS Gâldău (5-Serie B)	4–8	ACS Roseți (4)
6.	CS Viitorul Curcani (4)	0–3	AFC Unirea Mânăstirea (4)
7.	AFC Șoimii Progresu (5-Serie A)	4–1	CS Victoria Chirnogi (4)
8.	ACS Viitorul Dichiseni 2012 (5-Serie B)	2–1	AS Spicul Vâlcelele (4)

== Fourth round ==
=== Alba ===
These matches played in 2020. Fourth Round Results: Alba

Tie no	Home team (tier)	Score	Away team (tier)
1.	CS Navobi Alba Iulia (4)	–	CS Zlatna (4)
2.	ACS Nicolae Linca Cergău (4)	–	AS Viitorul Vama Seacă (4)
3.	ACS Spicul Daia Română (4)	–	FC Micești (4)
4.	ACS Băgău (5)	–	AS Voința Stremț (4)
5.	CS Universitatea Alba Iulia (4)	–	CS Olimpia Aiud (4)
6.	ACS Performanta Ighiu (4)	–	ACS Viitorul Sântimbru (4)
7.	AS Gaz Metan Valea Lungă (5)	–	CS CIL Blaj (4)
8.	AS Hidromecanica Șugag (5)	–	CS Ocna Mureș (4)

=== Argeș ===
These matches played in 2020. Fourth Round Results: Argeș

Tie no	Home team (tier)	Score	Away team (tier)
1.	ACS Recea (4)	?–?	ACS Poiana Lacului (4)
2.	ACS Energia Stolnici (5-South)	?–?	ACS Victoria Buzoiești (4)
3.	AS Lerești (5-North)	?–?	ACS Vulturii Priboieni 2017 (4)
4.	ACS Oarja (5-Center)	?–?	AS Juventus Bascov (4)
5.	AS Cimentul Valea Mare Pravăț (5-North)	?–?	AS Colibași (4)
6.	AS Partizanul Vlădești (5-North)	?–?	CS Sporting Piteşti (4)
7.	AS Șoimii Tigveni (5-Center)	?–?	ACS Voinţa Budeasa (4)
8.	ACS Steaua Negrași (5-South)	?–?	CS Real Bradu (4)

=== Bihor ===
These matches played on 25 September 2019. Fourth Round Results: Bihor

Tie no	Home team (tier)	Score	Away team (tier)
1.	AS Zorile Buntești (5-Serie 2)	1–4	Club Atletic Oradea (4)
2.	AS Gloria Beiuș (5-Serie 2)	0–3	CSC Crişul Sântandrei (4)
3.	CS Săcueni (4)	1–2	CS Viitorul Borş (4)
4.	FC Universitatea Oradea (4)	3–1	Unirea Embrak Livada (4)

=== Botoșani ===
These matches played in 2020. Fourth Round Results: Botoșani

Tie no	Home team (tier)	Score	Away team (tier)
1.	AS Nord Star Pomârla (5-North)	–	ACS Inter Dorohoi (4)
2.	AS Columna Roma (5-South)	–	AS Flacăra 1907 Flămânzi (4)
3.	Independentul Darabani (4)	–	AS Unirea Săveni (4)
4.	CS Dante Botoșani (4)	–	ACS Transdor Tudora (4)
5.	Voința Șendriceni (4)	–	ACS Rapid Ungureni (4)
6.	AS Flacăra Văculeşti (4)	–	ACS Unirea Curteşti (4)
7.	AS Sportivul Truşeşti (4)	–	AFC Viitorul Albeşti (4)
8.	AS Prosport Vârfu Câmpului (4)	–	AS 2000 Bucecea (4)

=== Brașov ===
==== Făgăraș zone ====
These matches is preliminary rounds for matches with teams from 4th League and was played on 10 October 2019. Fourth Round Results: Făgăraș zone East Serie

Tie no	Home team (tier)	Score	Away team (tier)
1.	AS Bradul Şinca (5-Făgăraș-East)	4–1	AS Poiana Mărului (5-Făgăraș-East)

These matches is preliminary rounds for matches with teams from 4th League and was played on 9 October 2019. Fourth Round Results: Făgăraș zone West Serie

Tie no	Home team (tier)	Score	Away team (tier)
1.	AS Săgeata Drăguş (5-Făgăraș-West)	2–2 (a.e.t.) (3–5 p)	FS Voila (5-Făgăraș-West)

=== Călărași ===
These matches will be played in 2020. Fourth Round Results: Călărași

Tie no	Home team (tier)	Score	Away team (tier)
1.	ACS Viitorul Dichiseni 2012 (5-Serie B)	–	CSM Oltenița (4)
2.	AS Petrolul Ileana (4)	–	AFC Unirea Mânăstirea (4)
3.	AFC Șoimii Progresu (5-Serie A)	–	AFC Dunărea Ciocănești (4)
4.	ACS Roseți (4)	–	CS Venus Independenţa (4)

== Fifth round ==
=== Brașov ===
Also was one preliminary tour with teams and was played on 23 October 2019. Preliminary Tour Results: Brașov & Făgăraș zone vs 4th League

Tie no	Home team (tier)	Score	Away team (tier)
1.	AS Cetatea Apaţa 2001 (5-Brașov)	3–0	AS Aripile Braşov (4)
2.	AS Bradul Şinca (5-Făgăraș-East)	5–1	AS Cetatea Homorod (4)
3.	FS Voila (5-Făgăraș-West)	4–0	AS Olimpic Voila (4)

Fifth Round will take place in 2020. Fifth Round Results: Brașov

Tie no	Home team (tier)	Score	Away team (tier)
1.	ACS Prejmer (4)	–	AS Cetățenii Ghimbav (4)
2.	FS Voila (5-Făgăraș-West)	–	AS Cetatea Apaţa 2001 (5-Brașov)
3.	ACSM Codlea (4)	–	CSM Corona Brașov (4)
4.	CS Inter Cristian (4)	–	FC Precizia Săcele (4)
5.	CS Chimia Oraşul Victoria (4)	–	ASC Olimpic Zărneşti (4)
6.	CS Colțea Brașov (4)	–	AFC Hărman (4)
7.	AS Prietenii Rupea (4)	–	AS Bradul Şinca (5-Făgăraș-East)
8.	ACS Steagul Roşu Braşov (4)	–	ASC Ciucaş Tărlungeni (4)
