= Prior Smith =

Canadian broadcaster (born 1944)

- Born: 1944 (age 80–81); Toronto, Ontario, Canada
- Occupation: broadcaster

Prior Smith (born 1944) is a retired Canadian broadcaster who owned and operated the network radio program Canada Calling and, for 35 years, produced the Canadian syndicated radio show "Grapeline".

== Broadcasting career ==
Born in Toronto, Ontario, Smith began his career in radio broadcasting with brief stints as a news reporter/announcer at CKLY-Lindsay, Ontario, (1966) CHYR Leamington/Windsor, Ontario (1967) and CJSS Cornwall, Ontario (1968) before moving to CJAD Montreal, Quebec in 1968. After one year at CJAD he moved to the legendary CFRB in Toronto in 1969. He worked as a general assignment news reporter/newscaster for the next 18 years.

While working in news at CFRB, Smith branched into radio network syndication creating and distributing a number of national radio programs, the most prominent of which was Grapeline featuring hockey commentator Don Cherry and sports broadcaster Brian Williams. The program, the longest running nationally syndicated radio show in Canadian history, started in the fall of 1984 and concluded in the spring of 2019.

Also during his time at CFRB, Smith created a syndicated radio news program to serve traveling and vacationing Canadians across the southern United States.

== Canada Calling ==
Canada Calling was a daily radio newscast prepared in southern Ontario throughout the winter months. It was available on demand online at http://www.canadacalling.com and syndicated to a network of radio stations across the U.S. Sunbelt and the Bahamas, which served the more than three million Canadian vacationers who travel south each winter.

The original program was created by CBC sports and news announcer Dave Price. It was launched January 4, 1954 on stations in Miami Beach and Tampa.

Price would retire in the mid-1970s, selling the operations to Canadian broadcast executive Finlay MacDonald.

In 1977, Smith formed his own network and his coverage of the market quickly expanded to include all of Florida, The Bahamas, Arizona, southern California and south Texas. For a brief period the two networks competed for audience before Price's original service ceased operations. Smith never missed a day hosting the daily newscast for the past 48 years and carried on the Canada Calling tradition through 2025, its 71st winter broadcast season.

Canada Calling's decades on air throughout Florida was honored by the Florida Association of Broadcasters at its annual convention in Miami Beach June 26, 2013 with Prior Smith in attendance representing the longest running radio show in Florida history.
