= United Arab Emirates Internet Exchange =

Internet exchange point in United Arab Emirates

UAE-IX
- Full name: United Arab Emirates Internet Exchange
- Abbreviation: UAE-IX
- Founded: 2012
- Location: United Arab Emirates, Dubai
- Website: uae-ix.net
- Members: 82
- Peak in: 207.6 Gbit/s
- Peak out: 196.5 Gbit/s
- Daily in (avg.): 160.2 Gbit/s
- Daily out (avg.): 153.4 Gbit/s

UAE-IX is a carrier- and data center-neutral internet exchange point (IXP) situated in Dubai (UAE). It interconnects global networks, network operators and content providers in the GCC region. Founded in 2012, UAE-IX is built on a fully redundant switching platform located in two data centers in Dubai, Datamena and Equinix. Initiated by the UAE’s Telecommunication Regulatory Authority (TRA) and fully managed by DE-CIX, UAE-IX delivers a local alternative for regional traffic exchange, localizing Internet content.

== Peering ==
Since inception in 2012, UAE-IX is the biggest Internet Exchange in Middle East and North Africa region in term of number of participating networks and volume of traffic.($) There are over 10 carriers who could provide connectivity to the Internet Exchange. It is also possible to get connected at the exchange through 4 partners who can provide connectivity without the need of physically being present at the Exchange (remote-peering).

Initially UAE-IX provided two options to get connected, with a Gigabit Ethernet (1 Gbit/s) or 10 Gigabit Ethernet (10 Gbit/s) port. With 80 regional and global customers connected to UAE-IX, the internet exchange exceeded 100 Gbit/s peak traffic in September 2018 and an additional port option for 100 Gigabit Ethernet (100 Gbit/s) was added.

== Location and regulation ==
UAE-IX is located at DATAMENA, a data center in the Dubai Production City, formerly known as International Media Production Zone (IMPZ), and the Equinix data centre in Dubai. UAE-IX uses a redundant network switches.

UAE-IX is supported by the Telecommunications Regulatory Authority (UAE) of the United Arab Emirates (UAE) and has emerged among the biggest internet exchange point (IXP) in the Middle East and North Africa (MENA) region.

== See also ==
- List of Internet exchange points
