= Eco - Association of the Internet Industry =

German Internet industry association

eco – Verband der Internetwirtschaft
- eco – Verband der Internetwirtschaft e.V
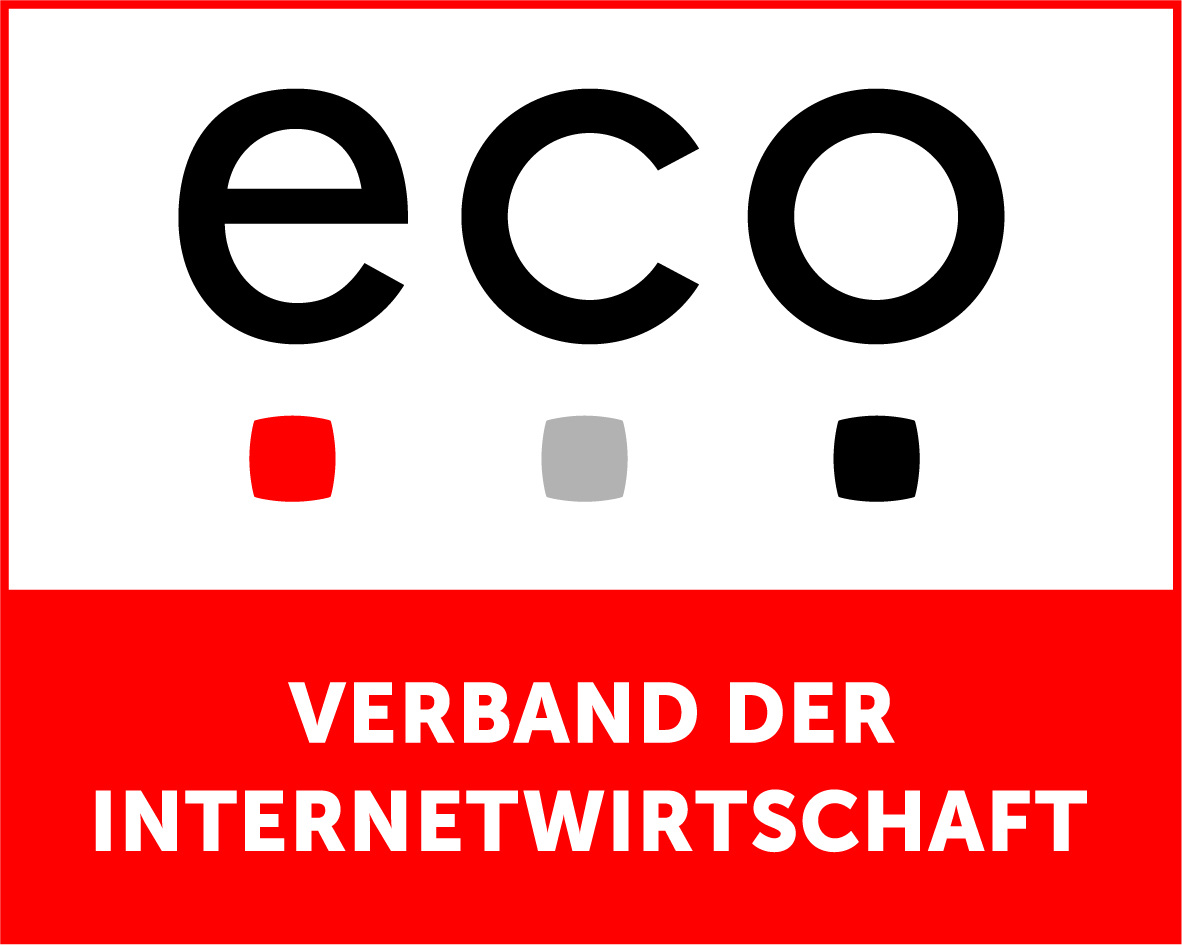
- Abbreviation: eco
- Formation: 26 June 1995
- Type: trade association, advocacy group
- Legal status: registered association; Registered lobbyist with the Bundestag and European Commission
- Purpose: representing the interests of its members
- Headquarters: Lichtstrasse 43h
- Location: Cologne, Germany
- Region served: Germany, Europe
- Members: c. 1,100 companies (2021)
- Chief executive (German: Vorstands-Vorsitzender): Oliver J. Süme
- Main organ: Board of directors (German: Präsidium)
- Subsidiaries: DE-CIX
- Staff: c. 70 (2021)
- Website: international.eco.de

eco – Verband der Internetwirtschaft e.V (transl. Association of the Internet industry) is the German Internet trade association and advocacy group.

The association defines itself as a special interest group (German: "Interessenvertretung") of Internet oriented businesses, and has the goal of promoting technologies, shaping framework conditions and representing the interests of its members towards policy makers and in national and international committees. With more than 1,100 member companies across 70 countries, eco is the largest Internet industry association in Europe, as of 2021.

eco is focused principally on the German Internet industry, and since 1997 has been active in lobbying for Internet legislation, establishing legal precedents on Internet-related issues, and operating the DE-CIX Internet exchange points, which are among the largest in the world.

== History ==
Founded on June 26, 1995 in Bonn, the name "eco" was chosen as an abbreviation of "electronic commerce." Its first task was the organisation and management of DE-CIX, which it undertook in the same year. eco's political work began in 1997 when it assisted in the formulation of the Information and Telecommunication Services Act.

== DE-CIX ==
eco is the organizational parent of DE-CIX, the "German Commercial Internet Exchanges"). The first and largest of the DE-CIX exchanges is the one which eco established in Frankfurt in 1995. As of 2022, DE-CIX Frankfurt is the largest Internet exchange in the world by volume of bandwidth, producing an average of 7 terabits per second, and third-largest by number of participating networks, after Sao Paulo and Jakarta. And As of 2022, DE-CIX maintains 29 IXPs throughout Europe, Asia, and North America.

== Political lobbying ==
The group is registered as a political lobbying group by the German Bundestag and the transparency register of the European Commission and Parliament. The European transparency register states the amount of eco's influencing work that focuses on EU policy makers was equivalent to the work of two full-time lobbyists (Note: one full-time and four ¼-time lobbyists) in 2019, for which eco paid between €50,000 and €99,999.

== Anti-spam congresses ==
eco has hosted annual German Anti-Spam Congresses since 2003, which have been integrated into the German "Internet Security Days" since 2011.

== Cloud computing ==
The establishment of EuroCloud Deutschland_eco e. V. took place in 2009. EuroCloud Germany_eco e. V. is an association of the cloud computing industry in Germany and part of the European EuroCloud network with the StarAudit.

== Cyber defense ==
The Advanced Cyber Defense Center (ACDC) is a center in which 28 partners from 14 European countries, coordinated by eco and funded by the European Union, jointly improve the security of networks and systems against botnets and malware. It opened in 2013. Another eco office was opened in Brussels in 2016. The center operates five principle projects:

- A centralized clearing house, acting as a single point of contact for data storage and analysis.
- A support center, delivering structured information to stakeholders and affected end users
- An analytic function focusing on the detection and mitigation of infected websites.
- An analytic function focusing on the detection of botnets and network anomalies
- The development of tools for identification and removal of malware from end user devices.

== Awards ==
eco annually presents the eco Internet Awards to companies which have made important contributions to the German Internet industry, and publishes numerous white-papers and industry reports.

== See also ==
- DE-CIX, a daughter company

== Sources ==
- Edwards, David (25 November 2020). "Internet industry group ECO reveals best practices for green data centres". Robotics and Automation News.
- Krischenowski, Dirk (23 June 2007). ".berlin TLD Awarded the German Internet Award 2007". CircleID.
- "Internet Exchange Point Directory". Packet Clearing House. 2021. Archived from the original on 24 June 2021.
- eco (2021). "Members@eco". eco.de. eco e.V.
- "VR 6973 – eco - Verband der Internetwirtschaft e.V.", Vereinsregister (Public Association Register), Amtsgericht Bonn, 1995
- "VR 14478 – eco - Verband der Internetwirtschaft e.V.", Vereinsregister (Public Association Register), Amtsgericht Köln, 28 April 2004
- "no.1989, eco -Verband der Internetwirtschaft e.V." (PDF), Bundestag lobby register, Bundestag, 2021
- "483354220663-40, eco - Verband der Internetwirtschaft", Transparency register of the European Commission, European Commission, 2021
