= DE-CIX =

Internet exchange point in Germany

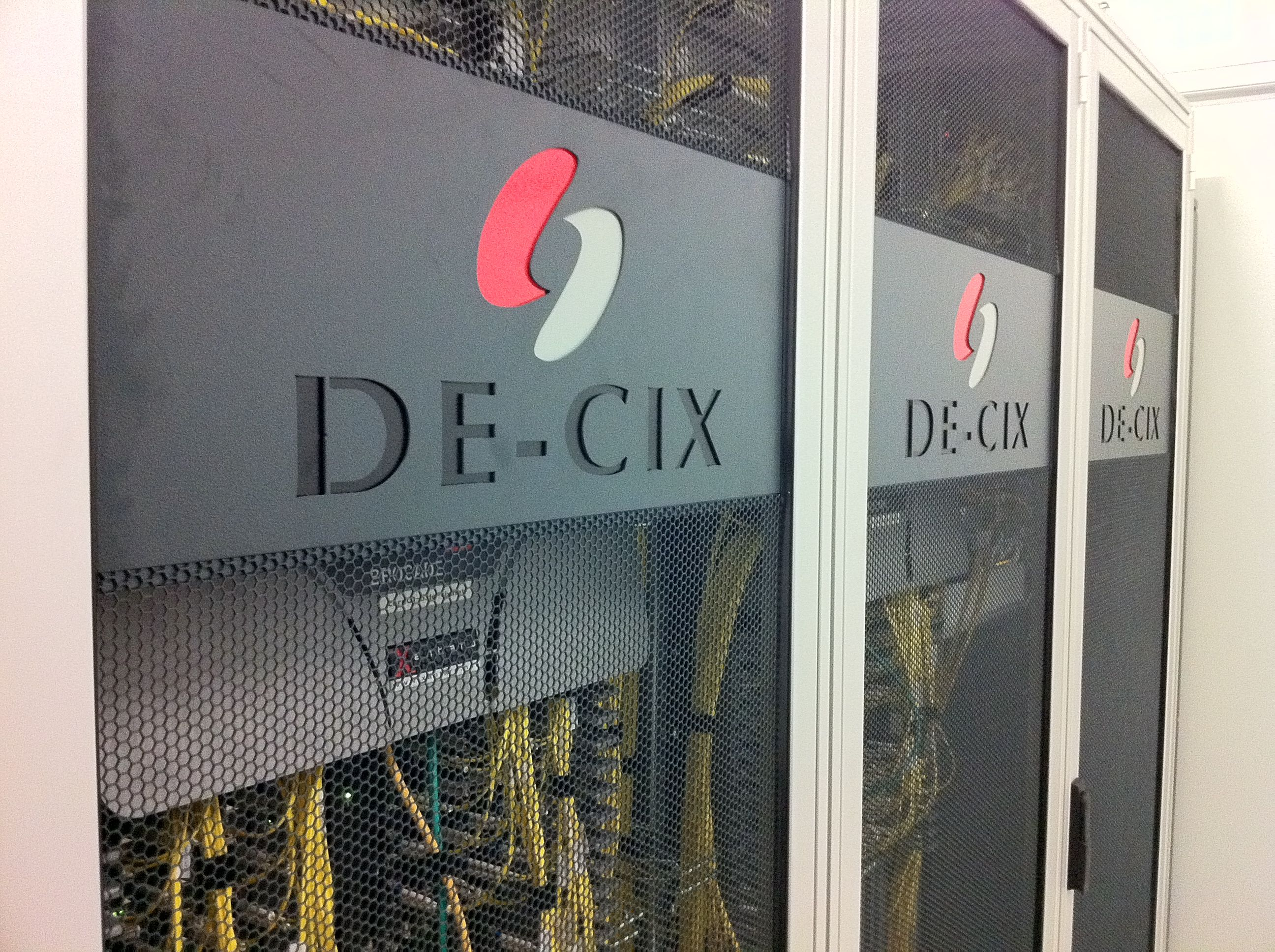
- Full name: DE-CIX
- Founded: 1995
- Location: Cologne, Germany
- Website: www.de-cix.net
- Members: 4,600+
- Ports: 110
- Peak: 21.47 Tbit/s
- Daily (avg.): 12.17 Tbit/s

DE-CIX (Deutsche Commercial Internet Exchange) is an operator of carrier- and data-center-neutral Internet exchanges (IXs), with operations in Europe, North and South America, Africa, the Middle East, India and Southeast Asia.

DE-CIX is accessible from data centers in over 600 cities worldwide and connects thousands of network operators (carriers), Internet service providers (ISPs), content providers, and corporate networks from more than 100 countries. In terms of data throughput, DE-CIX Frankfurt is one of the largest Internet exchanges in the world. All national and international DE-CIX activities and companies are consolidated under the umbrella of DE-CIX Group AG. DE-CIX employs over 250 people from more than 35 countries worldwide.

The DE-CIX Internet exchange point (IXP) situated in Frankfurt, Germany, is one of the largest IXPs worldwide, with throughput of 19.6 terabits per second (Tbit/s) in July 2026. In addition to DE-CIX in Frankfurt, DE-CIX operates IXPs in over 60 locations around the globe, with five further IXs exchanging peak traffic in excess of 1 Tbit/s, these being DE-CIX New York, DE-CIX Madrid, DE-CIX Mumbai, DE-CIX Dallas, and UAE-IX powered by DE-CIX with DE-CIX Mumbai becoming the largest IXP in the Asia-Pacific according to PeeringDB in 2021.

DE-CIX operates Internet exchanges worldwide and offers its customers various interconnection services. Its core business is the provision of comprehensive peering options. Peering allows DE-CIX customers to use the company's data center and carrier-neutral infrastructure to set up comprehensive data exchange and traffic between their networks and the networks of other peering partners (also known as "peers") connected to DE-CIX for a monthly fee. Peering is an alternative to IP transit, where network operators route their data traffic through the network of a larger provider for a fee and on an individual basis depending on the destination. In addition to Internet exchanges specializing in peering, DE-CIX has also been operating Cloud Exchanges at many of its global locations since 2013, enabling DE-CIX customers to connect to over 50 cloud service providers.

== Global locations and partner IXs ==
The DE-CIX global IXs (including presence in partner IXs) include:

Europe: Amsterdam, Athens, Barcelona, Berlin (powered by BCIX), Bucharest (powered by InterLAN), Düsseldorf, Frankfurt, Hamburg, Istanbul, Klagenfurt, Leipzig, Lisbon, Madrid, Marseille, Munich, Palermo, Prague (powered by NIX.CZ), Ruhr-CIX powered by DE-CIX, Sofia (powered by BIX.BG), Villach and Warsaw (powered by ATMAN)

Nordics: Copenhagen, Esbjerg, Helsinki, Kristiansand, Oslo, Stockholm

Africa: Kinshasa (DRC), Lagos (Nigeria)

North America: Chicago, Dallas, Houston, New York City, Phoenix, Richmond, and Seattle

South America: Rio de Janeiro, Sao Paulo

GCC: Aqaba IX powered by DE-CIX in Jordan, UAE-IX powered by DE-CIX in Dubai), IRAQ-IXP powered by DE-CIX, and Doha-IX powered by DE-CIX, SmartHub-IX powered by DE-CIX

India: Bengaluru, Chennai, Delhi, Hyderabad, Mumbai, and Kolkata

Central Asia: Karachi

Southeast Asia: Singapore, Kuala Lumpur, Jakarta, Johor Bahru, Bandar Seri Begawan (Borneo-IX powered by DE-CIX), Penang, Manila (powered by GetaFIX), Osaka and Toyko

== Executive board ==
Ivo Ivanov (CEO), Thomas King (CTO), Christian Reuter (CSO) and Alexander Hüsch (CFO) are responsible for the global business as DE-CIX's executive board. Felix Höger, Klaus Landefeld, Rudolf van Megen and Harald A. Summa comprise the supervisory board of DE-CIX Group AG. In addition, Harald A. Summa was the managing director of DE-CIX Group AG from 1996 to 2022 and chair of the executive board from 2017 to 2022.

== History ==
DE-CIX was founded in 1995 by three Internet service providers (ISPs): Hamburg-based MAZ, EUnet from Dortmund and XLink from Karlsruhe. Back then, German Internet traffic was still exchanged in the United States. To improve latency and reduce costs for backhaul connectivity, these ISPs decided to establish an Internet exchange in the back room of a postal office in Gutleutviertel in Frankfurt, and were the first to connect their networks in Frankfurt at DE-CIX.

DE-CIX was originally managed by Electronic Commerce Forum, now known as eco - Association of the Internet Industry. Other providers joined and made DE-CIX and Frankfurt the hotspot for the German internet. In 1998, DE-CIX moved its switching hardware to the Interxion data center in Frankfurt.

By 2000, DE-CIX had become Germany's largest Internet exchange and was ranked as one of the larger Internet exchanges in Europe. DE-CIX added its second switching site at the Interxion campus in 2001 and a third site in close proximity to its original roots at the TelecityGroup data center in 2004.

Until 2006, Cisco switches supported the growth in customers and traffic. DE-CIX extended its reach to additional data centers, introducing Force10 and Brocade switches and scaling the platform to over 700 10-Gigabit ports. Over the years, DE-CIX has attracted networks from all over the world, especially from Eastern Europe, leading to an annual traffic growth rate of up to 100 percent per year.

In 2012, DE-CIX began its international expansion with the establishment of its first Internet exchange outside of Germany, UAE-IX powered by DE-CIX, in partnership with du/datamena in Dubai. Following this, in 2014, DE-CIX established its first Internet exchange in North America with the launch of DE-CIX New York. Further expansions followed in close succession, in Southern Europe in 2016, in India in 2018 with Mumbai-IX powered by DE-CIX, later to become DE-CIX Mumbai, and in 2021 in Southeast Asia.

In 2013, DE-CIX introduced DE-CIX Apollon, its new Ethernet-based platform. The platform utilizes the ADVA Optical Networking FSP 3000 and Infinera CloudExpress 2 gear for the optical backbone, and Nokia’s 7950 XRS series and Nokia’s 7750 SR-s series for the IP network. The optical backbone has a total capacity of 48 terabits per second across a mesh-network topology and provides transport speeds of up to eight terabits per second per fiber. DE-CIX Apollon utilizes DWDM equipment and is built on a switching layer supported by Nokia (former Alcatel-Lucent) service routers, which support up to 1440x100 Gigabit Ethernet ports or up to 288x400 Gigabit Ethernet ports.

In 2017, DE-CIX began to develop interconnection services for the enterprise sector, beginning with the introduction of DirectCLOUD, a service that enables customers to access cloud service providers. In 2022, the DirectCLOUD service enabled connectivity to more than 50 cloud service providers, including specialized local CSPs and global hyperscalers. Other interconnection services specifically designed for the needs of enterprises include: the Microsoft Azure Peering Service, Closed User Groups, and InterconnectionFLEX.

In 2019, DE-CIX was one of 3 IX operators to jointly develop the IX-API, which provides the basis for the automation of interconnection services over IXPs. In 2021, DE-CIX received a patent for its security service “Blackholing Advanced”, which enables innovative filtering mechanisms in the protection of networks against DDoS attacks.

DE-CIX experienced massive growth during the Covid-19 pandemic, regularly breaking traffic throughput records. DE-CIX Frankfurt, for example, exceeded 9 tbit/s peak traffic for the first time in March 2020, and 10 tbit/s in November of the same year.

In September 2022, a data throughput of 13.65 terabits per second was achieved at DE-CIX Frankfurt for the first time. According to its Annual Report 2021, DE-CIX had a connected customer capacity of over 96.2 Tbit/s at the end of 2021.

Traffic at DE-CIX locations, particularly in Frankfurt, continued to increase in the following years. New peak traffic records frequently coincided with major live sporting events that attracted large streaming audiences, including UEFA Champions League matches. The most recent peak traffic record at DE-CIX Frankfurt was reached on the evening of 10 November 2026 (corresponding to the preload of Grand Theft Auto VI), amounting to 22.30 Tbit/s.

By August 2026, more than 4,600 network operators (carriers), ISPs, content providers, corporate networks and other organizations from more than 100 countries were connected to DE-CIX, including major carriers, content and Internet service providers, and numerous enterprise customers. As of the same date, the company operates over 60 IXs on five continents, and its interconnection services are accessible from data centers in over 600 cities worldwide.

== Interception and monitoring by intelligence services ==
The Federal Intelligence Service (BND) has intercepted DE-CIX traffic since 2009, when the German Chancellery put pressure on DE-CIX to cooperate with the BND. The BND mirrors the daily traffic via DE-CIX and evaluates it.

The DE-CIX node in New York is operated by DE-CIX North America Inc., a subsidiary of the German company, and is subject to US law. The DE-CIX node UAE-IX in Dubai must also "comply with the local legal regulations on the transfer of data.

== See also ==
- List of Internet exchange points
- List of Internet exchange points by size
