= Complex segregation analysis =

Complex segregation analysis (CSA) is a technique within genetic epidemiology to determine whether there is evidence that a major gene underlies the distribution of a given phenotypic trait. CSA also provides evidence to whether the implicated trait is inherited in a Mendelian dominant, recessive, or codominant manner.

== Purpose of CSA ==
CSA is often a preliminary step in genetic epidemiology. The purpose of CSA is to provide initial evidence that a single gene has a major effect on a particular phenotypic trait. Only phenotypic information, not genotypic information, is required for CSA. CSA can provide evidence, but not definitively prove a trait is under the control of a single gene. Evidence from CSA studies can be used to justify which phenotypes might be appropriate for more in-depth studies such as linkage analysis.

== Study design and data analysis ==
CSA requires phenotypic information on family members in a pedigree. A variety of models with different parameters and assumptions about the nature of the inheritance of the trait are fit to the data. CSA studies may include non-genetic models which assume the trait has no genetic component and is only determined by environmental factors, models which include environmental components as well as multi-gene heritability components, and models which include environment, multi-gene heritability, and a single major gene to best fit the data. CSA software uses a maximum likelihood estimator to assign the best fitting coefficients to each component in all models. Nested models are then tested for their goodness of fit starting at the most complex. If two models are found to fit equally well, the more complex model is rejected in favor of the simpler model. If the best fitting model includes a single major gene component, there is evidence that the trait of interest is under Mendelian control.

== Examples of publications using CSA ==
- Schumacher MC, Hasstedt SJ, Hunt SC, Williams RR, Elbein SC (1992). "Major gene effect for insulin levels in familial NIDDM pedigrees". Diabetes. 41 (4): 416–23. doi:10.2337/diabetes.41.4.416. PMID 1607068.
- Pairitz G, Davignon J, Mailloux H, Sing CF (1988). "Sources of interindividual variation in the quantitative levels of apolipoprotein B in pedigrees ascertained through a lipid clinic". American Journal of Human Genetics. 43 (3): 311–21. PMC 1715383. PMID 3414686.

== See also ==
- Genetic epidemiology
- Genetic segregation
