= Canadian Snowbird Association =

Canadian not-for-profit organization

- Abbreviation: CSA
- Formation: 1992 Lakeland, Florida, United States
- Type: Not-for-profit organization
- Purpose: The CSA is dedicated to defending and improving the rights and privileges of travelling Canadians.
- Headquarters: Toronto, Ontario, Canada
- Members: 110,000 (2017)
- Main organ: Board of Directors
- Website: www.snowbirds.org

The Canadian Snowbird Association (CSA; French: Association canadienne des « snowbirds ») is a not-for-profit organization that advocates for Canadians who travel to warmer climates during the winter (also known as snowbirds).

Founded in 1992 in Lakeland, Florida, the CSA was formed to oppose the reduction of payments by several Canadian provinces for out-of-country emergency medical care under the Canada Health Act (Sec. 11(1)(b)(ii)).

The CSA works with various government bodies within Canada and the U.S. to advocate on behalf of its members.

In 2017, the Canadian Snowbird Association (CSA) was approximated to have 110,000 members across Canada.

== Advocacy ==
According to the Canadian Snowbird Association, its advocacy efforts are informed by the following principles:

- To act upon and create a beneficial environment for members by promoting and protecting their interests and rights;
- To act in anticipation of possible changes in existing programs and services that may have adverse effects;
- To act in response to needs for new and appropriate services and programs.

The lobbying initiatives of the CSA are financed by the donations made by the membership.

=== Canada ===
In 1993, the government of New Brunswick proposed to reduce the amount of time that residents could spend outside of the province while maintaining their provincial health coverage from six months to 90 days. As a result of the advocacy work of the CSA, the New Brunswick government eventually shelved the proposal and maintained the existing six-month residency requirement.

Two years later, in 1995, the CSA worked with the Ontario government in order to restore the out-of-country emergency care in-patient rate of $400 per day. Under Premier Bob Rae, the Ontario government had reduced the reimbursement rate for emergency in-patient care from $400 per day to $100 per day. Similarly, in 1999, the CSA again worked with the Ontario government to increase the length of time that residents could be outside of the province, from six to seven months, and still retain health coverage under the Ontario Health Insurance Plan (OHIP). This increase was made in conjunction with another policy change which allowed beneficiaries of the Ontario Drug Benefit Program (ODB) to receive up to a 200-day supply of prescription medication for travel purposes.

In 2007, in an attempt to put pressure on the provincial and territorial governments to begin complying with the portability section of the Canada Health Act, then federal Minister of Health Tony Clement wrote a letter to every Minister of Health, reminding them of their obligations under the Canada Health Act.

The Canadian Snowbird Association also worked to introduce mail-in ballots, in Ontario, for eligible electors who are outside of the province during a provincial election. Since 2002, the CSA had recommended to the Ontario government that the Election Act be amended to include an absentee ballot option for temporarily absent residents. In 2010, An Act to Amend the Election Act and the Election Finances Act was passed in the Ontario legislature, which made the necessary changes to allow Ontario residents to vote by mail-in ballot during a general election.

The CSA has also worked with governments in Western Canada in order to secure more travel-friendly policies for long-term vacationing residents. In 2012, the CSA was instrumental in urging the Saskatchewan government to allow residents to get up to six months of prescription drugs processed at one time through the Saskatchewan Drug Plan. Prior to this change, drug plan beneficiaries had to submit two separate receipts for two three-month supplies. This reduction in red tape has resulted in less upfront costs and hassle for travelling residents of Saskatchewan.

At the federal level, the CSA recommended that the Canadian government introduce a Canadian passport with a 10-year validity period. In 2013, Ottawa implemented this recommendation.

Also in 2013, the Canadian Snowbird Association worked in partnership with the government of British Columbia to increase the amount of time that permanent residents can be out-of-country from six to seven months, while still maintaining their provincial health coverage. Later in the same year, the CSA effectively petitioned both the Manitoba and Alberta governments to extend the length of time that residents could temporarily reside outside of Canada to a maximum of 7 months in a 12-month period.

During the following year (2014), both the province of New Brunswick and Nova Scotia made similar changes to their travel-health policies. In May 2014, due to the efforts of the CSA, the New Brunswick government increased the amount of time that Medicare beneficiaries could temporarily remain outside of the province, from six to seven months, while retaining their eligibility for continued health coverage. Months later, the government of Nova Scotia announced a similar change which was made effective on August 1, 2014. In conjunction with the increase in out-of-province health coverage, the Nova Scotia Family and Seniors' Pharmacare Programs was also amended to allow for a 270-day prescription medication supply maximum for vacation purposes. Under previous policy, beneficiaries could obtain up to a 180-day supply of medication at the discretion of their physician and pharmacist. This amendment to policy was also implemented on August 1, 2014.

=== United States ===
In 2003, a proposed rule which sought to reduce the amount of time that Canadian tourists could spend physically present in the United States from six months to 30 days was rescinded after the CSA appeared before the U.S. House Small Business Committee on Capitol Hill. Florida Governor Jeb Bush mentioned the CSA in his press release, recognizing the efforts of the association in the successful withdrawal of the planned legislative changes.

At the state level, the CSA has engaged with the Florida government on the issue of property tax. The state of Florida employs a two-tier tax system which treats residents and non-residents differently. In 2006, the Canadian Snowbird Association appeared before the Florida Property Tax Reform Committee to present the association's position on proposed property tax reform.

In 2013, the state of Florida passed legislation which required foreign drivers to obtain an International Driving Permit in order to operate a motor vehicle. The CSA worked with government representatives at the state level, and the Florida Legislature repealed the requirement when it reconvened. In response to member feedback, in 2012 and 2013, the CSA lobbied the U.S. Congress to increase the amount of time that Canadian retirees could spend in the United States from six to eight months. As a result of CSA lobbying efforts, the "Canadian Retiree Visa" or "Snowbird Visa" was included in multiple bills in both the Senate and House of Representatives.

One of the bills, the JOLT Act, was attached to the comprehensive immigration reform bill which was approved by the Senate on June 27, 2013 with a final vote of 68 to 32. The JOLT Act has been referred to the Subcommittee on Immigration and Border Security in the U.S. House of Representatives.
