= Northern Ireland Child Support Agency =

Defunct Northern Irish government body

The Northern Ireland Child Support Agency (CSA) was the government body responsible for the calculation, enforcement and collection of Child Maintenance in Northern Ireland. The CSA was an executive agency of the Department for Social Development in Northern Ireland. Its role was to ensure that appropriate maintenance is paid for children whose parents live apart.

It was superseded by the Child Maintenance and Enforcement Division of the Department for Social Development on 1 April 2008.
