= Ceragenin =

Class of antimicrobial compounds

Ceragenins, or cationic steroid antimicrobials (CSAs), are synthetically-produced, small-molecule chemical compounds consisting of a sterol backbone with amino acids and other chemical groups attached to them. These compounds have a net positive charge that is electrostatically attracted to the negative-charged cell membranes of certain viruses, fungi and bacteria. CSAs have a high binding affinity for such membranes (including Lipid A) and are able to rapidly disrupt the target membranes leading to rapid cell death. While CSAs have a mechanism of action that is also seen in antimicrobial peptides, which form part of the body's innate immune system, they avoid many of the difficulties associated with their use as medicines.

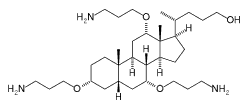
CSA-8, member of Ceragenin family

Ceragenins were discovered by Paul B. Savage of Brigham Young University's Department of Chemistry and Biochemistry. In data previously presented by Savage and other researchers, CSAs were shown to have broad-spectrum antibacterial activity. Derya Unutmaz, Associate Professor of Microbiology and Immunology at the Vanderbilt University School of Medicine, tested several CSAs in his laboratory for their ability to kill HIV directly. Unutmaz said in 2006 "We have some preliminary but very exciting results. But we would like to formally show this before making any claims that would cause unwanted hype."

On February 6, 2006, researchers including Savage announced, before peer review, that a ceragenin compound, CSA-54, appeared to inactivate HIV.

In 2023, Savage and his collaborators found that some ceragenins inhibit replication of coronaviruses, including SARS-CoV-2, through the stimulation of cytokine production.
