= Football in Romania =

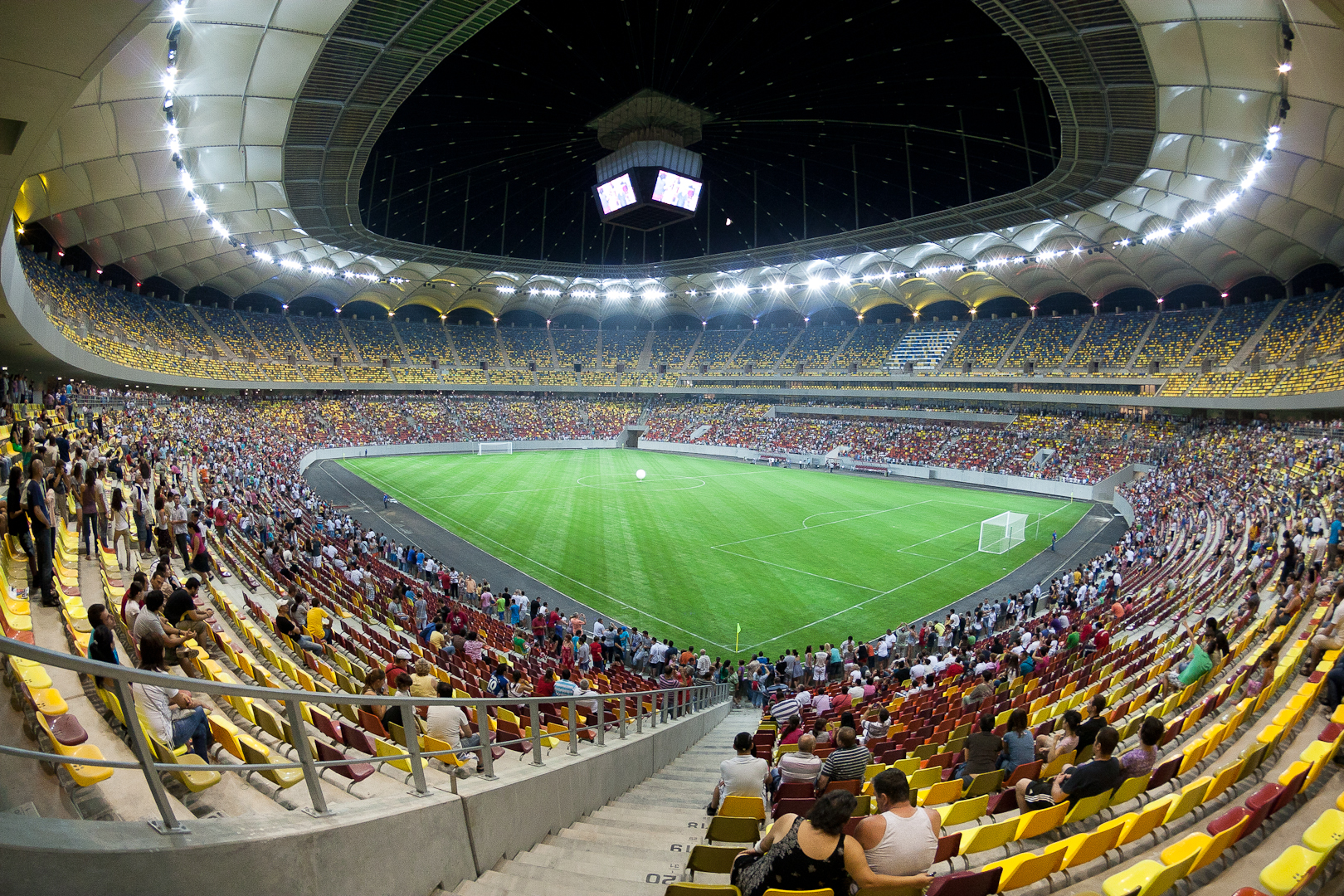
- Arena Națională in the capital Bucharest, used by FCSB and also the Romania national football team
- Country: Romania
- Governing body: Romanian Football Federation
- National team: Men's national team
- First played: 1909; 117 years ago

National competitions
- FIFA World Cup; UEFA European Championship; UEFA Nations League

Club competitions
- List: League: Liga I Liga I (women's football) Liga II Liga III Liga IV Cups: Cupa României Cupa României (women's football) Supercupa României

International competitions
- FIFA Club World Cup; UEFA Champions League; UEFA Women's Champions League; UEFA Europa League; UEFA Europa Conference League; UEFA Super Cup

Football is the most popular sport in Romania. The Romanian Football Federation (Romanian: Federaţia Română de Fotbal or FRF), a member of UEFA, is the sport's national governing body.

== History ==
=== The pre-war period ===
The Bucharest architect Gheorghe Radu Stănculescu discovered in a document from the archives of the British Navy that English sailors were playing football in the Danube area in 1865. This detail emerges from a document from the archives of the British Navy. It is a report by the commander of the military ship HMS "Cockatrice", marine lieutenant Gillson, addressed to Admiral Lord Paget, commander of the Mediterranean Fleet of the "Royal Navy". In his report dated 26 January 1866 (see facsimiles), Lieutenant Gillson disclosed that he had ordered "the vessel's usual anchorage to be changed to another place, where she was now exposed to the breezes, and near which was a field which served as an excellent recreation ground for cricket, quoits and football".

Another article from the press of the time from 1888 mentioned that in Arad, "a group of young people was hitting the ball". In 1890, the dentist Iuliu Weiner brought to Arad - from London, where he had studied in England - the first rules of the game written on paper, as well as the first "real" soccer ball on the territory of today's Romania. (Until then, the balls were "improvised"). Weiner promotes the new game, demonstrating its practice on the field in front of the current Arada high school no. 1.

On 25 June 1899, in Timișoara, the first football match on the current territory of Romania was organised on the Velocitas field, between students of the 6th and 7th grades of the Piarist High School, under the leadership of Professor Karl Müller. This was the first football match that respected the rules of the game from that period, although football had been played in Bucharest since 1885, in the area of the "Bolta Rece" restaurant (in the area where the Arc de Triomphe is located today). On 26 April 1902, in Timișoara, young people from the Iosefin neighbourhood founded the Timișoara Football Club, later the Timișoara Athletic Club. It was the first exclusive football club founded on today's territory of Romania. But the first interclub football match took place on August 20, 1902, on the field at Pădurea Verde, in front of 100 spectators. FC Timișoara lost to Reuniunea de Sport Lugoj with a score of 2-3.

In Cluj, as early as 1875, sports tournaments of the city's multi-sport clubs were organised. Football was not allowed within the city limits, so the games took place on the meadow to the east (today Nicolae Titulescu Boulevard). Since 1900, football matches have also taken place within these events, with the winners receiving silver medals and the finalists bronze. From the 1907-1908 season, the first official matches on the territory of our country took place in Cluj, within the second Hungarian league, followed the following season in Arad.

The first official football match in the Kingdom of Romania was played in 1907 near Kiseleff Street, Bucharest on an improvised pitch. The Romanians just watched. The competitors were English and German, employed in the textile or oil industry in Bucharest, Ploiesti or Câmpina. The chronicle of that game, published in the extraordinary magazine "From the world of sports", is considered a birth certificate for Romanian football.

The first domestic football competition was the ASAR Cup (Association of Athletic Societies of Romania), founded in October 1909. It included three clubs: Colentina and Olimpia from Bucharest (which won the title), and United from Ploiesti.

=== The interwar period ===
The first national championship Division A with all the reunited territories was in the 1921-22 season, and the most successful Romanian teams from the interwar period are Venus Bucharest, with seven titles, Chinezul Timișoara with six (consecutive) titles and Ripensia Timișoara with four. Since 1934, the Romanian Cup has also been held, the first winner being Ripensia Timișoara. Also in that season, the B division was established, followed two years later by the C division. In 1930 and 1934, the Romanian national team participated in the world championships.

At the end of the 30s, the Romanian teams make their debut in the European cups, a resounding victory achieved by Ripensia defeating AC Milan 3-0.

=== The post-war period ===
After the war, teams like UTA Arad, FC Argeș Pitești and the University of Craiova win the championship and qualify for the upper stages of European competitions.

The most famous football club in Romania is Steaua București, which in 1986 was the first team from Eastern Europe and the only one from Romania to win the European Champions Cup. Also, in 1989 he played another European Champions Cup final. It is the club with the most titles, 25, and the most Romanian Cups, 21. Steaua also managed to equal the performance of Chinese Timișoara, winning the title 6 times in a row between 1992-98.

Stele's rivals, Dinamo Bucharest, won 18 titles and 13 cups, and played a semi-final of the European Champions Cup in 1984, and in 1990 the semi -final of the UEFA Cup Winners' Cup.

Under the management of Walter Zenga, Steaua qualified for the UEFA Cup groups in the 2004–05 season, with Zenga qualifying a Romanian team in the "European Spring" for the first time since 1993 (when Steaua also reached the quarter-finals of the Cup Winners' Cup ). Since 2006, League I is composed of 18 teams, of which the last 4 are relegated. This year the championship changed its name from Division A to League I. In the 2005-2006 season, Steaua București and Rapid Bucharest reached the quarter-finals of the 2006 UEFA Cup. Steaua reached the semi-finals of the UEFA Cup, being eliminated on the edge of Middlesbrough FC and qualified three times in a row in the groups of the Champions League. Among the outstanding matches in the League are those with Dynamo Kyiv, score 4-1 and with Lyon, 1-1.

At the start of the 2006–07 season, the competition was forced to change its name from Division A to League I due to a trademark dispute over the name. In the new format, Dinamo Bucharest won its 18th title in history, 16th in a row for teams from Bucharest. CFR Cluj opened the way for a decade of dominance in the province, teams like Unirea Urziceni, Oțelul Galați, Astra Giurgiu or Viitorul Constanța won the title for the first time in history. Unirea Urziceni accumulated 8 points, a record for Romania in the league groups. CFR Clujwas the most prolific club in the last two decades, winning 8 championships, 4 cups and 2 super cups. CFR Cluj also produced some records, 10 points in the Champions League groups, 12 points in the Europa League groups and 10 points in the Conference League groups and a premiere, it was the first club from the province to win the Romanian Super Cup.

Among the most important players in the domestic championship in recent history are Ionel Danciulescu with the most appearances (515) and Eric de Oliveira foreign player with the most goals scored in League I (66).

== National championship ==
Professional league football began in Romania as Divizia A in 1909. The name of the top-flight league was changed to Liga I before the 2006–07 season. Currently, domestic play is organised in a four tier league system comprising Liga I, Liga II, Liga III, and various county leagues.

=== SuperLiga României ===
The country's top-flight division is SuperLiga României. The league contains 16 teams, with the champion going into the first qualify round in the UEFA Champions League. The runner-up starts in the second qualify round in the UEFA Conference League, where the 3rd also enters the first qualify round.Steaua București is the most successful club in the history of Liga I, having won 27 league championships and being runner-up 12 times. Dinamo București is the only other club with sustained success in Liga I, having won 18 titles.Steaua București doesn't have anything in common with FCSB, there're two different clubs with no association.The two clubs at the bottom of the league table are relegated to Liga II and the 13th and 14th placed teams plays in the relegation playoffs against the 3rd and 4th placed teams from Liga II.

=== Lower divisions ===
Liga II is the second division on the Romanian football pyramid and it has 20 teams. The first and second place teams are promoted while the third and fourth placed teams will have to play a play-off with the teams that finished 13th respectively 14th in Liga I.After the regular season, the top six teams advance to the promotion group, while the other 14 are allocated to two groups of seven, specifically termed the relegation groups. The team finishing 7th and 6th in these relegation groups faces relegation to the third division, while the teams that have finished 5th in each group participate in a playoff to determine who stays clear of relegation.

Liga III contains 100 teams. In Phase I, there's a regular season with 10 series, each consisting of 10 teams playing home and away matches, totaling 18 rounds or 18 matches for each team. Phase II is named the championship part, where each series features a play-off among the top four and a play-out among the remaining six teams. After Phase II concludes, we move to the final part of the championship. In Phase III, only the top two teams from the play-offs, totaling 20 teams, will participate. Two promotion rounds will take place. After Phase II concludes, we move to the final part of the championship. In Phase III, only the top two teams from the play-offs, totaling 20 teams, will participate. Two promotion rounds will take place. The five winners of the final round will earn promotion to the Liga II.

=== Cup competitions ===
In addition to league, there are three major cup competitions: the Cupa României, open to all Romanian professional football clubs, the Supercupa României, which matches the champions of Liga I and the winners of the Cupa României, and the Cupa Ligii(defunct). In case the same team achieves the double by winning both the Liga I and Cupa României, the Supercupa is disputed between that club and the league's runner-up.

== Qualification for European competitions ==
Competition	Round	Who Qualifies
UEFA Champions League	First Qualifying Round	Liga I Champion
UEFA Europa League	First Qualifying Round	Winner of the Cupa României
UEFA Europa Conference League
UEFA Europa Conference League	Second Qualifying Round	Liga I Runner-up
UEFA Europa Conference League	Second Qualifying Round	Liga I Third placed club from play-off/Winner of the play-out/Runner-up of the play-out

== Romania national football team ==
The Romania national football team played its first match in 1922 and is one of only four national teams to have taken part in the first three World Cups, the other three being Brazil, France, and Belgium. Overall, they have played in seven World Cups, most recently in 1998. They have also competed in four European Championships, most recently in 2016. The team's most successful period was in the 1990s when, led by Gheorghe Hagi, they reached the quarterfinals of the 1994 World Cup. They also reached the last 16 of the 1998 World Cup, and the quarter-finals of Euro 2000.

=== World Cup squads ===
- 1930 FIFA World Cup
- 1934 FIFA World Cup
- 1938 FIFA World Cup
- 1970 FIFA World Cup
- 1990 FIFA World Cup
- 1994 FIFA World Cup
- 1998 FIFA World Cup

=== European Champions squads ===
- UEFA Euro 1984
- UEFA Euro 1996
- UEFA Euro 2000
- UEFA Euro 2008
- UEFA Euro 2016
- UEFA Euro 2024

== Domestic football ==
Many old, traditional teams in the first division have experienced financial difficulties, eventually leading to relegation and even dissolution, such as Politehnica Timișoara, Universitatea Cluj, Universitatea Craiova, Rapid București, Petrolul Ploieşti, FC Brașov, FC Argeş, Oţelul Galaţi, Ceahlăul Piatra Neamţ, Politehnica Iaşi and Pandurii Târgu Jiu. They were replaced by teams with less tradition in the first level of the Romanian league system, such as Botoşani, Concordia Chiajna, Dunărea Călărași, Hermannstadt Sibiu, Juventus București, Viitorul Constanța, Sepsi Sfântu Gheorghe or Voluntari.

Dissolved traditional teams were usually re-founded by supporters' associations or by municipalities. The fact that they bore similar names and colors to the original teams made neutral fans call them "clones". Some of these teams later re-gained the record and official name of the original ones.

The country's most successful team, Steaua București, kept the stadium and history of the team while the clone lost the right to use the name and changed it to FC FCSB.

A number of modern stadiums have been built in the country, with the most notable examples being Steaua StadiumGhencea, Cluj Arena, Ilie Oană Stadium, Stadionul Ion Oblemenco, Stadionul Tudor Vladimirescu and Stadionul Francisc von Neuman.

== Largest Romanian football stadiums ==
Overall rank	Stadium	Capacity	City	Club	Open
1	Arena Națională	55,634	Bucharest	Romania national Football team, FCSB	2011
2	Stadionul Dan Păltinișanu	32,972	Timișoara	ASU Politehnica Timișoara, Ripensia Timișoara	1960
3	Stadionul Iftimie Ilisei	32,700	Medgidia	CS Medgidia	1983
4	Stadionul Steaua	31,254	Bucharest	Steaua București	2021
5	Stadionul Ion Oblemenco	30,983	Craiova	CS Universitatea Craiova	2017
6	Cluj Arena	30,201	Cluj-Napoca	Universitatea Cluj	2011

== See also ==
- Romanian Professional Football League
- Sport in Romania
- Match fixing in Romanian football
- Romanian Football Federation
- Romania national football team
- Romania national football team players
- Romania national under-21 football team
- Romania national under-19 football team
- Romania national under-17 football team
- Romania women's national football team
- Romanian football league system
- List of football stadiums in Romania

== Attendances ==
The average attendance per top-flight football league season and the club with the highest average attendance:

Season	League average	Best club	Best club average
2024–25	6,532	FCSB	15,657
2023–24	7,258	FCSB	19,903
2022–23	5,532	FCSB	15,485
2021–22	—	—	—
2020–21	—	—	—
2019–20	3,566	Universitatea Craiova	13,064
2018–19	3,425	Universitatea Craiova	14,833
2017–18	3,567	FCSB	11,888
2016–17	2,950	Steaua București	9,389
2015–16	3,345	Steaua București	9,158
2014–15	3,630	Petrolul Ploieşti	5,971
2013–14	3,709	Petrolul Ploieşti	10,000
2012–13	5,184	Steaua București	21,099
2011–12	4,855	Steaua București	15,751
2010–11	5,022	Politehnica Timișoara	11,059
2009–10	4,902	CFR Cluj	9,451
2008–09	6,044	Politehnica Timișoara	13,956
2007–08	5,349	Politehnica Timișoara	12,118
2006–07	5,417	Politehnica Timișoara	11,912
2005–06	5,629	Politehnica Timișoara	14,667
2004–05	6,564	Politehnica Timișoara	18,000
2003–04	7,237	Politehnica Timișoara	23,267
2002–03	7,263	Politehnica Timișoara	21,733
2001–02	5,734	Universitatea Craiova	8,978
2000–01	6,778	Steaua București	12,400
1999–2000	5,783	Universitatea Craiova	14,529
1998–99	5,727	Rapid	9,971
1997–98	6,108	CSM Reşiţa	11,235
1996–97	6,885	Jiul Petroşani	12,471
1995–96	4,796	Rapid	8,824
1994–95	5,817	Universitatea Craiova	9,765
1993–94	5,458	Rapid	9,118
1992–93	6,299	Rapid	11,941
1991–92	6,241	Dacia Unirea Brăila	10,882
1990–91	7,574	Dacia Unirea Brăila	16,294
1989–90	9,744	Universitatea Craiova	23,267
1988–89	10,607	Universitatea Craiova	20,588
1987–88	11,534	Politehnica Timișoara	21,412
1986–87	11,712	Steaua București	21,118
1985–86	12,162	Steaua București	26,765
1984–85	13,062	Rapid	20,706
1983–84	10,714	Universitatea Craiova	22,353
1982–83	11,575	Universitatea Craiova	21,882
1981–82	12,123	Universitatea Craiova	22,529
1980–81	12,192	Universitatea Craiova	21,882
1979–80	12,511	Universitatea Craiova	19,059
1978–79	13,073	Politehnica Timișoara	18,882
1977–78	13,288	Universitatea Craiova	22,118
1976–77	14,623	Universitatea Craiova	26,824
1975–76	12,273	Universitatea Craiova	24,765
1974–75	14,603	Universitatea Craiova	31,176
1973–74	12,979	Universitatea Craiova	26,400
1972–73	11,323	Universitatea Craiova	20,800
1971–72	11,555	Steaua București	19,000
1970–71	10,703	Rapid	17,067
