= Fortuna Becicherecu Mic =

Fortuna Becicherecu Mic may refer to:

- ACS Fortuna Becicherecu Mic, a men's football club in Becicherecu Mic, Romania.
- ACS Fortuna Becicherecu Mic (women), a women's football club in Becicherecu Mic, Romania.
