= CSM Târgu Mureș (football) =

Romanian football club

- Full name: Clubul Sportiv Municipal; Târgu Mureș
- Nickname: Mureșenii (The Mureș Men)
- Short name: Târgu Mureș
- Founded: 2018
- Dissolved: 2019
- Ground: Trans-Sil
- Capacity: 8,200
Home colours	Away colours

Clubul Sportiv Municipal Târgu Mureș, commonly known as CSM Târgu Mureș, or simply Târgu Mureș, was a Romanian professional football club based in Târgu Mureș, Mureș County.

The team was founded in the summer of 2018 as the football section of CSM Târgu Mureș, in order to continue the tradition of former ASA Târgu Mureș (2013), but the project disbanded after only one year of activity.

== History ==
Târgu Mureș' football history began in 1944 with CS Târgu Mureș and continued with ASA Târgu Mureș (1962) and ASA 2013 Târgu Mureș. All three teams played multiple seasons in the Liga I; their best results are finishing as runners-up in the first league (ASA 1962 in the 1974–75 season and ASA 2013 in the 2014–15 season).

CSM Târgu Mureș was founded in the summer of 2018 as the football section of CSM Târgu Mureș, a multi-sport club established on 19 December 2017, following the bankruptcy of ASA 2013 Târgu Mureș.

== Ground ==
The club played its home matches at Trans-Sil Stadium in Târgu Mureș, with a capacity of 8,200 seats.

== Honours ==
Liga IV – Mureș County

- Winners (1): 2018–19

== League history ==
Season	Tier	Division	Place	Cupa României
2018–19	4	Liga IV (MS)	1st (C)	
