= 2018–19 Liga IV =

77th season of the Liga IV, the fourth tier of the Romanian football league

Liga IV
- Season: 2018–19

The 2018–19 Liga IV was the 77th season of Liga IV and the 51st since the 1968 administrative and territorial reorganization of the country, representing the fourth tier of the Romanian football league system. The champions of each county association played against one from a neighbouring county in a play-off for promotion to Liga III.

This is the second season when the counties were divided into seven regions, each consisting of six counties and the draw was made on 15 February 2019, with four months before the first matches.

== County leagues ==
North–East

- Bacău (BC)
- Botoșani (BT)
- Iași (IS)
- Neamț (NT)
- Suceava (SV)
- Vaslui (VS)

North–West

- Bihor (BH)
- Bistrița-Năsăud (BN)
- Cluj (CJ)
- Maramureș (MM)
- Satu Mare (SM)
- Sălaj (SJ)

Center

- Alba (AB)
- Brașov (BV)
- Covasna (CV)
- Harghita (HR)
- Mureș (MS)
- Sibiu (SB)

West

- Arad (AR)
- Caraș-Severin (CS)
- Gorj (GJ)
- Hunedoara (HD)
- Mehedinți (MH)
- Timiș (TM)

South–West

- Argeș (AG)
- Dâmbovița (DB)
- Dolj (DJ)
- Olt (OT)
- Teleorman (TR)
- Vâlcea (VL)

South

- Bucharest (B)
- Călărași (CL)
- Giurgiu (GR)
- Ialomița (IL)
- Ilfov (IF)
- Prahova (PH)

South–East

- Brăila (BR)
- Buzău (BZ)
- Constanța (CT)
- Galați (GL)
- Tulcea (TL)
- Vrancea (VN)

== Promotion play-off ==
The matches were played on 15 and 22 June 2019.

Team 1	Agg.	Team 2	1st leg	2nd leg
Region 1 (North-East)				
Bacău (BC)	6–1	(BT) Viitorul Albești	5–0	1–1
Viitorul Liteni (SV)	3–5	(NT) Ozana Târgu Neamț	1–4	2–1
Hușana Huși (VS)	w/o	(IS) Moldova Cristești	w/o	w/o
Region 2 (North-West)				
Viitorul Ulmeni (MM)	2–4	(SJ) Unirea Mirșid	2–2	0–2
Satu Mare (SM)	6–1	(BN) Minerul Rodna	5–0	1–1
Florești (CJ)	0–4	(BH) Sânmartin	0–2	0–2
Region 3 (Center)				
Gheorgheni (HR)	3–5	(SB) Viitorul Șelimbăr	2–3	1–2
Stăruința Zagon (CV)	4–4	(BV) Olimpic Zărnești	2–1	2–3
Târgu Mureș (MS)	9–2	(AB) Sportul Petrești	6–0	3–2
Region 4 (West)				
Voința Lupac (CS)	1–8	(TM) Fortuna Becicherecu Mic	0–2	1–6
Progresul Pecica (AR)	3–1	(HD) Retezatul Hațeg	2–1	1–0
Strehaia (MH)	2–4	(GJ) Gilortul Târgu Cărbunești	2–1	0–3
Region 5 (South-West)				
Real Bradu (AG)	1–5	(VL) Viitorul Dăești	1–2	0–3
Unirea Brânceni (TR)	0–1	(DJ) Tractorul Cetate	0–0	0–1
Slatina (OT)	4–1	(DB) Gloria Cornești	2–0	2–1
Region 6 (South)				
Mostiștea Ulmu (CL)	5–4	(B) Carmen București	3–3	2–1
Recolta Gheorghe Doja (IL)	2–0	(IF) Viitorul Pantelimon	2–0	0–0
Mihai Bravu (GR)	1–9	(PH) Blejoi	0–3	1–6
Region 7 (South-East)				
CSU Galați (GL)	5–1	(BZ) Team Săgeata	2–1	3–0
Viitorul Ianca (BR)	8–1	(VN) Mausoleul Mărășești	5–1	3–0 (w/o)
Pescărușul Sarichioi (TL)	2–8	(CT) Poseidon Limanu	1–2	1–6

== League standings ==
=== Alba County ===
Team changes from the previous season

- CS Ocna Mureș achieved promotion to Liga III.
- Nicolae Linca Cergău (Series II winners) was promoted from Liga V Alba.
- Industria Galda II (Series I winners) declined promotion from Liga V Alba.
- Rapid CFR Teiuș (15th place) and Arieșul Apuseni (16th place) were relegated to Liga V Alba.
- Transalpina Șugag, Euro Șpring, Cuprirom Abrud and Fortuna Lunca Mureșului withdrew.
- AFC Micești, Navobi Alba Iulia, Dacia Mihalț and Viitorul Vama Seacă were admitted upon request.
- Viitorul Spicul Daia Romană was renamed Spicul Daia Romană.

Pos	Team	Pld	W	D	L	GF	GA	GD	Pts	Qualification or relegation
1	Sportul Petrești (C, Q)	26	20	3	3	96	23	+73	63	Qualification to promotion play-off
2	Voința Stremț	26	18	3	5	79	30	+49	57	
3	CIL Blaj	26	16	6	4	67	27	+40	54	
4	Zlatna	26	15	7	4	81	33	+48	52	
5	Olimpia Aiud	26	13	8	5	57	22	+35	47	
6	Viitorul Sântimbru	26	12	10	4	56	28	+28	46	
7	Micești	26	10	4	12	57	58	−1	34	
8	Viitorul Vama Seacă	26	9	6	11	39	47	−8	33	
9	Spicul Daia Romană	26	9	4	13	46	53	−7	31	
10	Nicolae Linca Cergău	26	10	1	15	54	92	−38	31	
11	Energia Săsciori	26	7	4	15	33	61	−28	25	
12	Navobi Alba Iulia	26	7	2	17	33	85	−52	23	
13	Metalul Aiud (R)	26	4	4	18	26	74	−48	16	Relegation to Liga V Alba
14	Dacia Mihalț (R)	26	1	0	25	21	112	−91	3	Relegation to Liga V Alba

Rules for classification: 1) Points; 2) Head-to-head points; 3) Head-to-head goal difference; 4) Head-to-head goals scored; 5) Head-to-head away goals scored; 6) Goal difference; 7) Goals scored.
(C) Champions; (Q) Qualified for the phase indicated; (R) Relegated

=== Arad County ===
Team changes from the previous season

- Crișul Chișineu-Criș achieved promotion to Liga III.
- Speranța Turnu (Series A winners) and Podgoria Pâncota (Series B winners) were promoted from Liga V Arad.
- Voința Mailat withdrew.
- Frontiera Curtici (14th place) and Victoria Nădlac (15th place) were spared from relegation.

Pos	Team	Pld	W	D	L	GF	GA	GD	Pts	Qualification or relegation
1	Progresul Pecica (C, Q)	28	25	2	1	110	15	+95	77	Qualification to promotion play-off
2	Unirea Sântana	28	19	6	3	92	29	+63	63	
3	Frontiera Curtici	28	17	5	6	60	29	+31	56	
4	Victoria Zăbrani	28	16	2	10	78	38	+40	50	
5	Socodor	28	15	1	12	68	55	+13	46	
6	UTA Arad II	28	13	6	9	76	49	+27	45	
7	Păulișana Păuliș	28	12	6	10	67	51	+16	42	
8	Podgoria Pâncota	28	13	3	12	64	54	+10	42	
9	Glogovăț	28	13	2	13	62	62	0	41	
10	Ineu	28	12	3	13	62	52	+10	39	
11	Șoimii Șimand	28	12	3	13	54	51	+3	39	
12	Victoria Felnac	28	9	2	17	36	67	−31	29	
13	Cetate Săvârșin	28	8	1	19	51	109	−58	25	
14	Speranța Turnu (R)	28	2	2	24	28	131	−103	8	Relegation to Liga V Arad
15	Victoria Nădlac (R)	28	1	2	25	13	129	−116	5	Relegation to Liga V Arad

Rules for classification: 1) Points; 2) Head-to-head points; 3) Head-to-head goal difference; 4) Head-to-head goals scored; 5) Head-to-head away goals scored; 6) Goal difference; 7) Goals scored.
(C) Champions; (Q) Qualified for the phase indicated; (R) Relegated

=== Argeș County ===
Team changes from the previous season

- Unirea Bascov achieved promotion to Liga III.
- Voința Budeasa (Series Center winners) was promoted from Liga V Argeș.
- Rapid Davidești (Series North winners) and ACS Lunca Corbului (Series South winners) declined promotion from Liga V Argeș.
- Atletic Bradu II (13th place; withdrew) and AS Micești (15th place) were relegated to Liga V Argeș
- CS Albota and Inter Câmpulung withdrew.
- Olimpia Suseni (16th place) was spared from relegation, subsequently was renamed CSC Suseni.
- AS Băiculești and ACS Costești were admitted upon request.
- CS Mioveni III was replaced by CS Mioveni II, which withdrew from Liga III.

Pos	Team	Pld	W	D	L	GF	GA	GD	Pts	Qualification or relegation
1	Real Bradu (C, Q)	28	21	5	2	124	29	+95	68	Qualification to promotion play-off
2	Voința Budeasa	28	21	4	3	101	37	+64	67	
3	Colibași	28	17	3	8	87	56	+31	54	
4	Victoria Buzoiești	28	16	5	7	63	36	+27	53	
5	Poiana Lacului	28	15	5	8	92	50	+42	50 (Note: Poiana Lacului–Băiculești 5–2; Băiculești –Poiana Lacului 3–3)	
6	Băiculești	28	15	5	8	92	60	+32	50	
7	Sporting Pitești	28	15	4	9	72	56	+16	49	
8	DLR Pitești	28	13	8	7	72	56	+16	47	
9	Mioveni II	28	13	2	13	92	84	+8	41	
10	Gloria Berevoești	28	11	3	14	56	65	−9	36	
11	Suseni	28	9	1	18	55	95	−40	28	
12	Costești	28	7	6	15	49	84	−35	27	
13	Basarabi Curtea de Argeș	27	5	0	22	31	94	−63	15 (Note: Basarabi Curtea de Argeș–Juventus Bascov 11–1; Juventus Bascov –Basarabi Curtea de Argeș 3–0)	
14	Juventus Victoria 1992 Bascov	28	4	3	21	40	129	−89	15	
15	Viitorul Ștefănești (R)	27	0	0	27	21	116	−95	0	Relegation to Liga V Argeș

Rules for classification: 1) Points; 2) Head-to-head points; 3) Head-to-head goal difference; 4) Head-to-head goals scored; 5) Head-to-head away goals scored; 6) Goal difference; 7) Goals scored.
(C) Champions; (Q) Qualified for the phase indicated; (R) Relegated

=== Bacău County ===
Team changes from the previous season

- Gauss Bacău achieved promotion to Liga III.
- CSȘM Bacău was renamed CSM Bacău.
- Lumina Itești, Zorile Faraoani, Atletico Junior Bacău, Biruința Letea Veche Bacău, AS Bârsănești, Viitorul Urechești and Viitorul Berești-Tazlău were admitted to Liga IV Bacău as Liga V Bacău County was disbanded.

Bacău Series

Pos	Team	Pld	W	D	L	GF	GA	GD	Pts	Qualification or relegation
1	CSM Bacău (Q)	22	21	0	1	74	8	+66	63	Qualification to championship play-off
2	Dinamo Bacău (Q)	22	15	3	4	65	23	+42	48	Qualification to championship play-off
3	Voința Gârleni	22	14	4	4	70	23	+47	46	Ineligible for promotion
4	Filipești	22	12	3	7	65	41	+24	39	Ineligible for promotion
5	Negri	22	12	2	8	48	41	+7	38	Ineligible for promotion
6	Zorile Faraoani	22	10	4	8	43	34	+9	34	Ineligible for promotion
7	Viitorul Nicolae Bălcescu (Q)	22	9	3	10	36	49	−13	30	Qualification to championship play-off
8	Atletico Junior Bacău	21	8	1	12	42	49	−7	25	
9	Lumina Itești	22	6	1	15	36	71	−35	19	
10	Siretul Bacău	22	5	3	14	30	67	−37	18	
11	Aripile Cleja	22	4	3	15	36	80	−44	15	
12	Biruința Letea Veche Bacău	21	1	1	19	10	69	−59	4	

Rules for classification: 1) Points; 2) Head-to-head points; 3) Head-to-head goal difference; 4) Head-to-head goals scored; 5) Head-to-head away goals scored; 6) Goal difference; 7) Goals scored.
(Q) Qualified for the phase indicated

Valea Trotușului Series

Pos	Team	Pld	W	D	L	GF	GA	GD	Pts	Qualification or relegation
1	Viitorul Curița (Q)	22	21	1	0	153	13	+140	64	Qualification to championship play-off
2	Voința Oituz	22	18	0	4	83	27	+56	54	Ineligible for promotion
3	Vulturul Măgirești	22	15	1	6	75	35	+40	46	Ineligible for promotion
4	Uzu Dărmănești (Q)	22	13	2	7	66	37	+29	41	Qualification to championship play-off
5	Moinești (Q)	22	13	1	8	48	35	+13	40	Qualification to championship play-off
6	Măgura Cașin	22	12	2	8	67	50	+17	38	
7	Gloria Zemeș	22	11	2	9	54	42	+12	35	
8	Dofteana	22	7	1	14	34	80	−46	22	
9	Bârsănești	22	6	1	15	35	70	−35	19	
10	Viitorul Urechești	22	6	0	16	46	81	−35	18	
11	Viitorul Berești-Tazlău	22	2	1	19	18	114	−96	7	
12	Flamura Roșie Sascut	22	1	2	19	16	111	−95	5	

Rules for classification: 1) Points; 2) Head-to-head points; 3) Head-to-head goal difference; 4) Head-to-head goals scored; 5) Head-to-head away goals scored; 6) Goal difference; 7) Goals scored.
(Q) Qualified for the phase indicated

Championship play-off

The teams start the play-off with the points earned during the regular season, excluding results against the last two teams.

Pos	Team	Pld	W	D	L	GF	GA	GD	Pts	Qualification
1	CSM Bacău (C, Q)	10	9	0	1	104	14	+90	78	Qualification to promotion play-off
2	Viitorul Curița	10	8	1	1	150	20	+130	77	
3	Dinamo Bacău	9	3	1	5	72	47	+25	46	
4	Uzu Dărmănești	9	4	0	5	67	51	+16	41	
5	Moinești	10	4	0	6	43	67	−24	40	
6	Viitorul Nicolae Bălcescu	10	0	0	10	28	74	−46	18	

Rules for classification: 1) Points; 2) Head-to-head points; 3) Head-to-head goal difference; 4) Head-to-head goals scored; 5) Head-to-head away goals scored; 6) Goal difference; 7) Goals scored.
(C) Champions; (Q) Qualified for the phase indicated

=== Bihor County ===
Team changes from the previous season

- Biharea Vașcău (16th place) was relegated to Liga V Bihor.
- CA Oradea (Series I winners) was promoted from Liga V Bihor.
- Unirea Oșorhei (Series II winners) declined promotion from Liga V Bihor.
- Olimpia Salonta (15th place) was spared from relegation.

Pos	Team	Pld	W	D	L	GF	GA	GD	Pts	Qualification or relegation
1	Sânmartin (C, Q)	28	24	4	0	102	22	+80	76	Qualification to promotion play-off
2	CA Oradea	28	20	3	5	84	26	+58	63	
3	Viitorul Borș	28	15	4	9	72	36	+36	49	
4	Oșorhei	28	13	6	9	57	51	+6	45	
5	Crișul Sântandrei	28	13	5	10	56	50	+6	44	
6	Diosig	28	13	4	11	59	55	+4	43	
7	Unirea Valea lui Mihai	28	12	6	10	46	58	−12	42	
8	Unirea Livada	28	11	7	10	48	41	+7	40	
9	Universitatea Oradea	28	9	6	13	45	46	−1	33	
10	Crișul Aleșd	28	10	2	16	55	91	−36	32	
11	Ștei	28	8	6	14	40	52	−12	30 (Note: Ștei–Mădăras 2–0; Mădăras–Ștei 2–2)	
12	Mădăras	28	9	3	16	42	75	−33	30	
13	Bihorul Beiuș (R)	28	6	6	16	24	63	−39	24	Qualification for relegation play-out
14	Olimpia Salonta (R)	28	7	2	19	28	58	−30	23	Qualification for relegation play-out
15	Săcueni (R)	28	5	6	17	36	70	−34	21	Relegation to Liga V Bihor
16	Dacia Gepiu (R)	0	0	0	0	0	0	0	0 (Note: Dacia Gepiu withdrew after 10 rounds and all its results were canceled.)	Expelled

Rules for classification: Rules for classification: 1) Points 2) Head-to-head points; 3) Head-to-head goal difference; 4) Head-to-head goals scored; 5) Head-to-head away goals scored; 6) Goal difference; 7) Goals scored.
(C) Champions; (Q) Qualified for the phase indicated; (R) Relegated
Notes:

Relegation play-out

The teams from the 13th and 14th places of the Liga IV - Bihor County faced the 2nd place teams from the two series of the Liga V – Bihor County.

Team 1	Agg.	Team 2	1st leg	2nd leg
Bihorul Beiuș	2–3	Foresta Tileagd	2–2	0–1
Olimpia Salonta	3–5	Unirea Roșia	0–3	3–2

=== Bistrița-Năsăud County ===
Team changes from the previous season

- Dinamo Uriu (13th place; withdrew) and Luceafărul Șieu (15th place; withdrew) were relegated to Liga V Bistrița-Năsăud.
- Someșul Feldru (3rd in Series I, play-off winners), Someșul Rebrișoara (2nd in Series I, play-off runners-up) and Real Teaca (3rd in Series II, 3rd in the play-off) were promoted from Liga V Bistrița-Năsăud.
- Voința Livezile was spared from relegation.

South Series

Pos	Team	Pld	W	D	L	GF	GA	GD	Pts	Qualification
1	Progresul Năsăud	12	9	2	1	42	11	+31	29 (Note: Dumitra–Progresul Năsăud 1–1; Progresul Năsăud –Dumitra 0–0)	Qualification to championship play-off
2	Dumitra	12	9	2	1	40	9	+31	29	Qualification to championship play-off
3	Atletico Monor	12	9	0	3	32	18	+14	27	Qualification to championship play-off
4	Voința Livezile	12	4	1	7	35	27	+8	13	Qualification to championship play-off
5	Real Teaca	12	4	0	8	18	34	−16	12	Qualification to championship play-out
6	Viitorul Lechința	12	3	1	8	14	36	−22	10 (Note: Viitorul Lechința withdrew after 2 rounds before the end of the regular season and lost all remaining matches with 0–3.)	Qualification to championship play-out
7	Voința Cetate	12	0	2	10	8	54	−46	2	Qualification to championship play-out
8	Academia Gloria Bistrița (D)	0	0	0	0	0	0	0	0 (Note: Academia Gloria Bistrița withdrew from championship before the start of the season.)	Withdrew

Rules for classification: 1) Points; 2) Head-to-head points; 3) Head-to-head goal difference; 4) Head-to-head goals scored; 5) Head-to-head away goals scored; 6) Goal difference; 7) Goals scored.
(D) Disqualified
Notes:

North Series

Pos	Team	Pld	W	D	L	GF	GA	GD	Pts	Qualification
1	Minerul Rodna	14	11	2	1	54	19	+35	35	Qualification to championship play-off
2	Silvicultorul Maieru	14	10	0	4	41	33	+8	30	Qualification to championship play-off
3	Heniu Leșu	14	8	2	4	57	30	+27	26	Qualification to championship play-off
4	Hebe Sângeorz-Băi	14	7	3	4	35	23	+12	24	Qualification to championship play-off
5	Eciro Forest Telciu	13	4	3	6	18	24	−6	15	Qualification to championship play-out
6	Someșul Feldru	14	4	2	8	29	33	−4	14	Qualification to championship play-out
7	Someșul Rebrișoara	13	3	1	9	29	40	−11	10	Qualification to championship play-out
8	Spicul Salva	14	1	1	12	19	80	−61	4	Qualification to championship play-out

Rules for classification: 1) Points; 2) Head-to-head points; 3) Head-to-head goal difference; 4) Head-to-head goals scored; 5) Head-to-head away goals scored; 6) Goal difference; 7) Goals scored.

Championship play-off

Pos	Team	Pld	W	D	L	GF	GA	GD	Pts	Qualification
1	Minerul Rodna (C, Q)	14	9	3	2	45	18	+27	30	Qualification to promotion play-off
2	Dumitra	14	8	4	2	31	16	+15	28	
3	Progresul Năsăud	14	8	3	3	34	17	+17	27	
4	Silvicultorul Maieru	14	7	2	5	34	40	−6	23	
5	Atletico Monor	13	6	1	6	25	35	−10	19	
6	Heniu Leșu	14	3	2	9	27	39	−12	11	
7	Voința Livezile	14	3	1	10	33	47	−14	10	
8	Hebe Sângeorz-Băi	13	2	2	9	19	36	−17	8	

Rules for classification: 1) Points; 2) Head-to-head points; 3) Head-to-head goal difference; 4) Head-to-head goals scored; 5) Head-to-head away goals scored; 6) Goal difference; 7) Goals scored.
(C) Champions; (Q) Qualified for the phase indicated

Championship play-out

Pos	Team	Pld	W	D	L	GF	GA	GD	Pts	Relegation
9	Someșul Rebrișoara	10	9	0	1	43	12	+31	27	
10	Eciro Forest Telciu	10	8	1	1	43	13	+30	25	
11	Someșul Feldru	10	3	2	5	26	21	+5	11	
12	Real Teaca	10	3	1	6	23	34	−11	10	
13	Voința Cetate	10	3	0	7	18	40	−22	9	
14	Spicul Salva	10	2	0	8	20	53	−33	6	
15	Viitorul Lechința (D)	0	0	0	0	0	0	0	0 (Note: Viitorul Lechința withdrew after 2 rounds before the end of the regular season.)	Relegation to Liga V Bistrița-Năsăud

Rules for classification: 1) Points; 2) Head-to-head points; 3) Head-to-head goal difference; 4) Head-to-head goals scored; 5) Head-to-head away goals scored; 6) Goal difference; 7) Goals scored.
(D) Disqualified

=== Botoșani County ===
Team changes from the previous season

- Viitorul Costești (14th place; excluded) was relegated to Liga V Botoșani.
- Inter Dorohoi (North Series winners) was promoted from Liga V Botoșani.
- FCM Dorohoi 2017 MCV (Liga V Botoșani South Series winners) was replaced by Flacăra Văculești.
- Avântul Albești was renamed Viitorul Albești.
- Bucovina Rogojești withdrew.
- Viitorul Blândești (13th place) was spared from relegation.

Pos	Team	Pld	W	D	L	GF	GA	GD	Pts	Qualification or relegation
1	Viitorul Albești (C, Q)	24	20	1	3	74	29	+45	61	Qualification to promotion play-off
2	Inter Dorohoi	24	17	5	2	74	22	+52	56	
3	TransDor Tudora	24	15	4	5	82	33	+49	49	
4	Unirea Curtești	24	15	1	8	71	42	+29	46	
5	Bucecea	24	12	3	9	53	42	+11	39	
6	Unirea Săveni	24	10	2	12	49	46	+3	32 (Note: Unirea Săveni–Rapid Ungureni 2–2; Rapid Ungureni-Unirea Săveni 4–5)	
7	Rapid Ungureni	24	10	2	12	49	57	−8	32	
8	Flacăra 1907 Flămânzi	24	9	0	15	47	75	−28	27 (Note: Prosport Vârfu Câmpului–Flacăra 1907 Flămânzi 6–2; Flacăra 1907 Flămânzi-Prosport Vârfu Câmpului 7–2)	
9	Prosport Vârfu Câmpului	24	8	3	13	42	72	−30	27	
10	Voința Șendriceni	24	7	3	14	34	40	−6	24	
11	Sportivul Trușești	24	7	1	16	46	81	−35	22 (Note: Sportivul Trușești–Flacăra Văculești 3–0; Flacăra Văculești-Sportivul Trușești 3–4)	
12	Flacăra Văculești	24	7	1	16	27	68	−41	22	
13	Europa Hilișeu (R)	24	5	2	17	53	94	−41	17	Relegation to Liga V Botoșani
14	Viitorul Blândești (D)	0	0	0	0	0	0	0	0 (Note: Viitorul Blândești withdrew from the championship after 3 rounds and all its results were canceled.)	Withdrew

Rules for classification: 1) Points; 2) Head-to-head points; 3) Head-to-head goal difference; 4) Head-to-head goals scored; 5) Head-to-head away goals scored; 6) Goal difference; 7) Goals scored.
(C) Champions; (D) Disqualified; (Q) Qualified for the phase indicated; (R) Relegated

=== Brașov County ===
Team changes from the previous season

- SR Brașov achieved promotion to Liga III.
- Voința Hurez (15th place) was relegated to Liga V Brașov.
- ACS Prejmer (Brașov Series winners) was promoted from Liga V Brașov.
- Luceafărul Mărgineni (Făgăraș East Series winners) and Progresul Voivodeni (Făgăraș West Series winners) declined promotion from Liga V Brașov.
- Prietenii Rupea (15th place) was spared from relegation due to the withdrawal of Avântul Dumbrăvița.
- Inter Tărlungeni was renamed Ciucaș Tărlungeni.

Pos	Team	Pld	W	D	L	GF	GA	GD	Pts	Qualification or relegation
1	Olimpic Zărnești (Q)	26	23	2	1	121	14	+107	71	Qualification to promotion play-off
2	Precizia Săcele	26	20	0	6	83	25	+58	60	
3	Ciucaș Tărlungeni	26	15	6	5	50	20	+30	51	
4	Codlea	26	16	2	8	70	46	+24	50	
5	Colțea Brașov	26	14	5	7	77	41	+36	47	
6	Inter Cristian	26	14	2	10	95	44	+51	44	
7	Steagu Roșu Brașov	26	14	1	11	54	40	+14	43	
8	Cetatea Homorod	26	13	2	11	73	62	+11	41	
9	Prejmer	26	12	1	13	72	58	+14	37	
10	Chimia Victoria	26	10	5	11	47	49	−2	35	
11	Aripile Brașov	26	7	4	15	53	74	−21	25	
12	Carpați Berivoi	26	5	1	20	38	92	−54	16	
13	Prietenii Rupea (R)	26	2	3	21	25	85	−60	9	Relegation to Liga V Brașov
14	Olimpic Voila (R)	26	0	0	26	15	223	−208	0	Relegation to Liga V Brașov

Rules for classification: 1) Points; 2) Head-to-head points; 3) Head-to-head goal difference; 4) Head-to-head goals scored; 5) Head-to-head away goals scored; 6) Goal difference; 7) Goals scored.
(Q) Qualified for the phase indicated; (R) Relegated

=== Brăila County ===
Team changes from the previous season

- Victoria Traian was relegated from Liga III.
- Gloria Movila Miresii (9th place) and Dacia Unirea Brăila II (10th place) were relegated to Liga V Brăila.
- FC Urleasca (Series I winners) was promoted from Liga V Brăila.
- Viitorul Cireșu (Series II winners) declined promotion from Liga V Brăila.

Pos	Team	Pld	W	D	L	GF	GA	GD	Pts	Qualification
1	Viitorul Ianca	16	15	1	0	59	6	+53	46	Qualification to championship play-off
2	Victoria Traian	16	10	4	2	52	23	+29	34	Qualification to championship play-off
3	Viitorul Șuțești	16	8	3	5	44	31	+13	27	Qualification to championship play-off
4	Voința Vișani	16	8	3	5	35	35	0	27	Qualification to championship play-off
5	Urleasca	16	6	5	5	36	36	0	23	Qualification to championship play-off
6	Cazasu	16	5	4	7	37	36	+1	19	Qualification to championship play-out
7	Pandurii Tudor Vladimirescu	16	3	3	10	31	51	−20	12	Qualification to championship play-out
8	Viitorul Însurăței	16	2	3	11	29	51	−22	9	Qualification to championship play-out
9	Dunărea Tichilești	16	2	0	14	25	79	−54	6	Qualification to championship play-out

Rules for classification: 1) Points; 2) Head-to-head points; 3) Head-to-head goal difference; 4) Head-to-head goals scored; 5) Head-to-head away goals scored; 6) Goal difference; 7) Goals scored.

Championship play-off

The championship play-off was contested in a double round-robin tournament between the five highest-ranked teams from the regular season. The teams started with half of the points accumulated in the first stage of the season.

Pos	Team	Pld	W	D	L	GF	GA	GD	Pts	Qualification
1	Viitorul Ianca (C, Q)	8	5	0	3	18	11	+7	38	Qualification to promotion play-off
2	Victoria Traian	8	6	0	2	24	16	+8	35	
3	Voința Vișani	8	3	1	4	17	18	−1	24	
4	Urleasca	8	3	1	4	11	19	−8	22	
5	Viitorul Șuțești	8	2	0	6	19	25	−6	20	

Rules for classification: 1) Points; 2) Head-to-head points; 3) Head-to-head goal difference; 4) Head-to-head goals scored; 5) Head-to-head away goals scored; 6) Goal difference; 7) Goals scored.
(C) Champions; (Q) Qualified for the phase indicated

Championship play-out

The championship play-out was contested in a double round-robin tournament between the four lowest-ranked teams from the regular season. The teams started with half of the points accumulated in the first stage of the season.

Pos	Team	Pld	W	D	L	GF	GA	GD	Pts	Relegation
6	Viitorul Însurăței	6	6	0	0	33	12	+21	23	
7	Cazasu	6	2	0	4	18	21	−3	16	
8	Pandurii Tudor Vladimirescu	6	2	0	4	19	24	−5	12	
9	Dunărea Tichilești (R)	6	2	0	4	8	21	−13	9	Relegation to Liga V Brăila

Rules for classification: 1) Points; 2) Head-to-head points; 3) Head-to-head goal difference; 4) Head-to-head goals scored; 5) Head-to-head away goals scored; 6) Goal difference; 7) Goals scored.
(R) Relegated

=== Bucharest ===
The Liga IV Bucharest was played in a double round-robin format featuring sixteen teams, followed by a championship play-off contested in a single round-robin format between the top four teams of the regular season. Based on their positions in the regular season, the teams will start the play-off with the following points: 1st place – 3 points, 2nd place – 2 points, 3rd place – 1 point, and 4th place – 0 points.

Team changes from the previous season

- Academia Rapid București achieved promotion to Liga III.
- Venus București (15th place) and Sportul Studențesc București (16th place; withdrew) were relegated to Liga V Bucharest.
- LPS Mircea Eliade (winners), Unirea Politehnica București (3rd place) and Vis de București (4th place) were promoted from Liga V Bucharest.
- Atletico București (runners-up) declined promotion from Liga V Bucharest.
- Termo București and Progresul Spartac București II withdrew.
- Bucharest United and Real Crângași București were admitted upon request.

Pos	Team	Pld	W	D	L	GF	GA	GD	Pts	Qualification or relegation
1	Steaua București	30	28	1	1	191	6	+185	85	Qualification to championship play-off
2	Carmen București	30	26	1	3	148	18	+130	79	Qualification to championship play-off
3	Progresul 2005 București	30	25	0	5	151	28	+123	75	Qualification to championship play-off
4	ACS FC Dinamo București	30	23	3	4	118	29	+89	72	Qualification to championship play-off
5	Bucharest United	30	20	2	8	99	41	+58	62	
6	Comprest GIM București	30	16	3	11	63	56	+7	51	
7	Asalt București	30	16	2	12	54	59	−5	50	
8	Victoria București	30	14	2	14	55	74	−19	44	
9	Unirea Politehnica București	30	10	2	18	61	100	−39	32	
10	Metaloglobus București II	30	9	3	18	45	94	−49	30	
11	AFC Rapid București	30	9	3	18	38	90	−52	30	
12	Romprim București	30	9	0	21	44	90	−46	27	
13	Tricolor București	30	8	0	22	35	90	−55	24	
14	Real Crângași București	30	7	1	22	33	164	−131	22	
15	LPS Mircea Eliade București (Note: LPS Mircea Eliade București withdrew after 15 rounds and lost all remaining matches with 0–3.)	29	4	0	25	27	121	−94	12	Relegation to Liga V Bucharest
16	Vis de București (Note: Vis de București withdrew after 19 rounds and lost all remaining matches with 0–3.)	29	3	1	25	18	120	−102	10	Relegation to Liga V Bucharest

Rules for classification: 1) Points; 2) Head-to-head points; 3) Head-to-head goal difference; 4) Head-to-head goals scored; 5) Head-to-head away goals scored; 6) Goal difference; 7) Goals scored.
Notes:

Championship play-off

All matches were played at Regie Stadium in Bucharest on 27 and 30 May, and 2 June 2019.

Pos	Team	Pld	W	D	L	GF	GA	GD	Pts	Qualification
1	Carmen București (C, Q)	3	3	0	0	9	3	+6	11	Qualification to promotion play-off
2	Steaua București	3	2	0	1	7	2	+5	9	
3	Progresul 2005 București	3	0	1	2	2	6	−4	2	
4	ACS FC Dinamo București	3	0	1	2	4	11	−7	1	

Rules for classification: 1) Points; 2) Head-to-head points; 3) Head-to-head goal difference; 4) Head-to-head goals scored; 5) Head-to-head away goals scored; 6) Goal difference; 7) Goals scored.
(C) Champions; (Q) Qualified for the phase indicated

=== Buzău County ===
Team changes from the previous season

- Gloria Buzău achieved promotion to Liga III.
- Victoria Boboc (16th place) was relegated to Liga V Buzău.
- Recolta Blăjani (Series I winners), Phoenix Poșta Câlnău (Series II winners) and AS Vintileanca (Series I 3rd place and promotion/relegation play-off winners) were promoted from Liga V Buzău.
- Șoimii Siriu (15th place) was spared from relegation due to the withdrawal of Tricolorul Gălbinași.
- Olimpia Râmnicu Sărat II ceded its place to LT "Ștefan Cel Mare" Râmnicu Sărat.
- Petrolul Berca was renamed Petrolul Viitorul Berca.
- AS Vintileanca was renamed AS Săhăteni Vintileanca.

Pos	Team	Pld	W	D	L	GF	GA	GD	Pts	Qualification or relegation
1	Team Săgeata (C, Q)	30	29	1	0	154	19	+135	88	Qualification to promotion play-off
2	Voința Lanurile	30	27	0	3	141	33	+108	81	
3	Avântul Zărnești	30	21	2	7	113	47	+66	65	
4	Montana Pătârlagele	30	18	5	7	80	42	+38	59	
5	Înfrățirea Zoița	30	18	2	10	75	43	+32	56	
6	Recolta Sălcioara	30	16	5	9	69	52	+17	53	
7	Phoenix Poșta Câlnău	30	15	3	12	72	52	+20	48	
8	Petrolul Viitorul Berca	30	12	3	15	72	70	+2	39	
9	Locomotiva Buzău	30	10	5	15	67	81	−14	35	
10	Diadema Gherăseni	30	9	2	19	54	95	−41	29	
11	Șoimii Siriu	30	9	2	19	60	137	−77	29	
12	Balta Albă	30	7	6	17	51	82	−31	27	
13	Recolta Blăjani (R)	30	7	4	19	56	88	−32	25	Qualification to relegation play-offs
14	LT "Ștefan Cel Mare" Râmnicu Sărat (R)	30	7	3	20	59	131	−72	24	Qualification to relegation play-offs
15	Săhăteni Vintileanca (R)	30	6	3	21	48	121	−73	21	Relegation to Liga V Buzău
16	Viitorul 08 Vernești (R)	30	3	6	21	39	117	−78	15	Relegation to Liga V Buzău

Rules for classification: 1) Points; 2) Head-to-head points; 3) Head-to-head goal difference; 4) Head-to-head goals scored; 5) Head-to-head away goals scored; 6) Goal difference; 7) Goals scored.
(C) Champions; (Q) Qualified for the phase indicated; (R) Relegated

Relegation play-offs

The 13th and 14th-placed teams of Liga IV Buzău faces the 2nd-placed teams in the two series of Liga V Buzău.

Team 1	Score	Team 2
Voința Limpeziș	6–4	Recolta Blăjani
Unirea Stâlpu	3–2	LT "Ștefan Cel Mare" Râmnicu Sărat

=== Caraș-Severin County ===
Team changes from the previous season

- Steaua Dunării Pojejena (12th place) and Agmonia Zăvoi (13th place; withdrew) were relegated to Liga V Caraș-Severin.
- Progresul Ezeriș (Reșița Zone winners) and ACS 2017 Slatina-Timiș (Caransebeș Zone winners) were promoted from Liga V Caraș-Severin.
- AS Berzasca withdrew.
- Șoimii Oțelu Roșu was admitted upon request.

Pos	Team	Pld	W	D	L	GF	GA	GD	Pts	Qualification or relegation
1	Voința Lupac (C, Q)	24	21	3	0	114	26	+88	66	Qualification to promotion play-off
2	Viitorul Caransebeș	24	21	2	1	100	19	+81	65	
3	Oravița	24	16	2	6	114	53	+61	50	
4	Rapid Buchin	24	13	3	8	78	47	+31	42	
5	Croația Clocotici	24	13	2	9	71	46	+25	41	
6	Moldova Nouă	24	13	0	11	66	68	−2	39	
7	Progresul Ezeriș	24	10	3	11	60	46	+14	33	
8	Metalul Bocșa	24	10	3	11	47	41	+6	33	
9	Slatina-Timiș	24	7	5	12	71	90	−19	26	
10	Șoimii Oțelu Roșu	24	8	0	16	59	79	−20	24	
11	Nera Bozovici	24	4	3	17	39	89	−50	15	
12	Foresta Armeniș	24	2	4	18	36	135	−99	10	
13	Anina	24	3	0	21	37	153	−116	9	

Rules for classification: 1) Points; 2) Head-to-head points; 3) Head-to-head goal difference; 4) Head-to-head goals scored; 5) Head-to-head away goals scored; 6) Goal difference; 7) Goals scored.
(C) Champions; (Q) Qualified for the phase indicated

=== Călărași County ===
Team changes from the previous season

- Viitorul Plătărești (Series A winners) and Victoria Dragoș Vodă (Series B winners) were promoted from Liga V Călărași.
- Unirea Dragalina (15th place) and Progresul Fundulea (16th place) were spared from relegation.

Pos	Team	Pld	W	D	L	GF	GA	GD	Pts	Qualification or relegation
1	Mostiștea Ulmu (C, Q)	32	28	3	1	144	12	+132	87	Qualification to promotion play-off
2	Dunărea Ciocănești	32	19	7	6	79	41	+38	64	
3	Unirea Mânăstirea	32	18	8	6	90	52	+38	62	
4	Venus Independența	32	18	2	12	92	44	+48	56	
5	Tricolorul Jegălia	32	14	9	9	57	44	+13	51	
6	Dunărea Grădiștea	32	15	5	12	56	59	−3	50	
7	Partizan Crivăț	32	15	3	14	71	72	−1	48 (Note: Victoria Chirnogi–Partizan Crivăț 2–3; Partizan Crivăț–Victoria Chirnogi 4–1)	
8	Victoria Chirnogi	32	15	3	14	77	72	+5	48	
9	Roseți	32	12	10	10	84	57	+27	46	
10	Progresul Fundulea	32	13	6	13	44	56	−12	45	
11	Steaua Radovanu	32	13	2	17	67	78	−11	41 (Note: Spicul Vâlcelele–Steaua Radovanu 4–1; Steaua Radovanu–Spicul Vâlcelele 3–0)	
12	Spicul Vâlcelele	32	12	5	15	58	77	−19	41	
13	Viitorul Curcani	32	11	7	14	53	71	−18	40	
14	Unirea Dragalina	32	10	5	17	49	92	−43	35 (Note: Victoria Lehliu–Unirea Dragalina 0–3; Unirea Dragalina–Victoria Lehliu 1–0)	
15	Victoria Lehliu (R)	32	11	2	19	50	78	−28	35	Relegation to Liga V Călărași
16	Victoria Dragoș Vodă (R)	32	5	4	23	27	98	−71	19	Relegation to Liga V Călărași
17	Zarea Cuza Vodă (R)	32	2	1	29	23	118	−95	7	Relegation to Liga V Călărași
18	Viitorul Plătărești (R)	0	0	0	0	0	0	0	0 (Note: Viitorul Plătărești withdrew after 4 rounds and all its results were canceled.)	Withdrew

Rules for classification: 1) Points; 2) Head-to-head points; 3) Head-to-head goal difference; 4) Head-to-head goals scored; 5) Head-to-head away goals scored; 6) Goal difference; 7) Goals scored.
(C) Champions; (Q) Qualified for the phase indicated; (R) Relegated

=== Cluj County ===
Team changes from the previous season

- Sticla Arieșul Turda achieved promotion to Liga III.
- Viitorul Feleacu (15th place) and Viitorul Mihai Georgescu Cluj-Napoca (16th place) were relegated to Liga V Cluj.
- Viitorul Soporu de Câmpie (Câmpia Turzii Zone winners) and Vicențiu Dej (Dej Zone runners-up) were promoted from Liga V Cluj.
- Viitorul Poieni (Cluj Zone winners), FC Bonțida (Gherla Zone winners) and Luceafărul Ghirișu Român (Mociu Zone winners) declined promotion from Liga V Cluj.
- Universitatea Cluj II and Viile Dejului withdrew.
- Supporter 2.0 Cluj-Napoca and Unirea Dej II were admitted upon request.
- Vicențiu Dej was renamed Someșul Dej.

Pos	Team	Pld	W	D	L	GF	GA	GD	Pts	Qualification or relegation
1	Florești (C, Q)	28	24	3	1	115	24	+91	75	Qualification to promotion play-off
2	Someșul Dej	28	23	2	3	112	24	+88	71	
3	Unirea Iclod	28	20	1	7	80	34	+46	61	
4	Câmpia Turzii	28	18	2	8	70	47	+23	56	
5	Sporting Apahida	28	18	0	10	81	46	+35	54	
6	Arieșul Mihai Viteazu	28	15	6	7	70	49	+21	51	
7	Atletic Olimpia Gherla	28	15	2	11	60	47	+13	47	
8	Unirea Tritenii de Jos	28	11	3	14	39	50	−11	36	
9	Someșul Gilău	28	11	3	14	54	73	−19	36	
10	Vulturul Mintiu Gherlii	28	9	6	13	62	54	+8	33	
11	Unirea Dej II	28	9	2	17	45	59	−14	29	
12	Supporter 2.0 Cluj-Napoca	28	8	3	17	58	124	−66	27	
13	CFR Dej	28	5	2	21	44	91	−47	17	
14	Viitorul Soporu de Câmpie (R)	28	4	3	21	39	99	−60	15	Relegation to Liga V Cluj
15	Armenopolis Gherla (R)	28	1	0	27	9	117	−108	3	Relegation to Liga V Cluj

Rules for classification: 1) Points; 2) Head-to-head points; 3) Head-to-head goal difference; 4) Head-to-head goals scored; 5) Head-to-head away goals scored; 6) Goal difference; 7) Goals scored.
(C) Champions; (Q) Qualified for the phase indicated; (R) Relegated

=== Constanța County ===
Team changes from the previous season

- CS Medgidia achieved promotion to Liga III.
- Unirea Topraisar (15th place) was relegated to Liga V Constanța.
- Poseidon Limanu-2 Mai (winners) and Axiopolis Cernavodă II (3rd place) were promoted from Liga V Constanța.
- CS Peștera (runners-up) declined promotion from Liga V Constanța.
- Voința Valu lui Traian (16th place) was spared from relegation.
- CS Cumpăna and FC Farul Constanța were admitted upon request.

Pos	Team	Pld	W	D	L	GF	GA	GD	Pts	Qualification or relegation
1	Poseidon Limanu-2 Mai (C, Q)	34	25	5	4	100	39	+61	80	Qualification to promotion play-off
2	Viitorul Fântânele	34	25	2	7	99	46	+53	77	
3	Năvodari	34	22	7	5	104	39	+65	73	
4	Gloria Albești	34	22	6	6	99	43	+56	72	
5	Lipnița-Carvăn	34	21	3	10	95	65	+30	66	
6	Agigea	34	19	7	8	94	51	+43	64	
7	Gloria Băneasa	34	20	3	11	95	68	+27	63	
8	Cumpăna	34	18	6	10	72	45	+27	60	
9	Sparta Techirghiol	34	15	6	13	77	82	−5	51	
10	FC Farul Constanța	34	15	4	15	91	65	+26	49	
11	Eforie	34	12	7	15	51	56	−5	43	
12	Ovidiu	34	12	4	18	57	74	−17	40	
13	Axiopolis Cernavodă II	34	11	4	19	63	68	−5	37	
14	Farul Tuzla	34	9	3	22	61	81	−20	30	
15	Portul Constanța	34	7	6	21	40	100	−60	27	
16	Știința ACALAB Poarta Albă	34	7	4	23	62	120	−58	25	
17	Mihail Kogălniceanu (R)	34	5	3	26	48	126	−78	18	Relegation to Liga V Constanța
18	Voința Valu lui Traian (R)	34	1	0	33	33	173	−140	3	Relegation to Liga V Constanța

Rules for classification: 1) Points; 2) Head-to-head points; 3) Head-to-head goal difference; 4) Head-to-head goals scored; 5) Head-to-head away goals scored; 6) Goal difference; 7) Goals scored.
(C) Champions; (Q) Qualified for the phase indicated; (R) Relegated

=== Covasna County ===
Team changes from the previous season

- BSE Belin (15th place) and Venus Ozun (16th place; withdrew) were relegated to Liga V Covasna.
- Progresul Sita Buzăului (winners) was promoted from Liga V Covasna.
- Oltul Coșeni (runners-up) declined promotion from Liga V Covasna.
- Dozsa Dalnic withdrew.

Pos	Team	Pld	W	D	L	GF	GA	GD	Pts	Qualification or relegation
1	Stăruința Zagon (C, Q)	26	21	3	2	123	14	+109	66	Qualification to promotion play-off
2	Păpăuți	26	21	1	4	72	14	+58	64	
3	Baraolt	26	16	4	6	98	41	+57	52	
4	Prima Brăduț	26	13	6	7	65	35	+30	45	
5	Nemere Ghelința	26	11	7	8	54	43	+11	40	
6	Covasna	26	12	3	11	47	50	−3	39	
7	Perkö Sânzieni	26	11	5	10	50	43	+7	38	
8	Reci	26	9	5	12	43	47	−4	32	
9	Harghita Aita Mare	26	9	2	15	38	71	−33	29	
10	Avântul Ilieni	26	8	3	15	41	62	−21	27	
11	Progresul Sita Buzăului	26	7	5	14	64	96	−32	26	
12	Cernat	26	6	6	14	46	81	−35	24	
13	Brețcu	26	6	5	15	27	90	−63	23	
14	Ojdula (R)	26	3	3	20	25	106	−81	12	Relegation to Liga V Covasna

Rules for classification: 1) Points; 2) Head-to-head points; 3) Head-to-head goal difference; 4) Head-to-head goals scored; 5) Head-to-head away goals scored; 6) Goal difference; 7) Goals scored.
(C) Champions; (Q) Qualified for the phase indicated; (R) Relegated

=== Dâmbovița County ===
Team changes from the previous season

- Sportul Voinești (North Series winners), Unirea Răcari (South Series winners) and Voința Vișina (West Series winners) were promoted from Liga V Dâmbovița.
- Spic de Grâu Ghimpați (16th place), Flacăra Zăvoiu (17th place) and Bradul Moroeni (18th place) were relegated to Liga V Dâmbovița.

Pos	Team	Pld	W	D	L	GF	GA	GD	Pts	Qualification or relegation
1	Gloria Cornești (C, Q)	34	29	4	1	180	34	+146	91	Qualification to promotion play-off
2	Recolta Gura Șuții	34	28	5	1	136	33	+103	89	
3	Unirea Răcari	34	26	2	6	113	36	+77	80	
4	Roberto Ziduri	34	20	6	8	110	67	+43	66	
5	Brezoaele	34	18	8	8	115	65	+50	62	
6	Unirea Ungureni	34	16	4	14	84	90	−6	52	
7	Olimpicii Ulmi	34	16	3	15	82	70	+12	51	
8	Fieni	34	16	2	16	83	72	+11	50	
9	Voința Perșinari	34	16	1	17	94	102	−8	49	
10	Progresul Mătăsaru	34	14	4	16	84	108	−24	46	
11	Sportul Voinești	34	14	2	18	84	120	−36	44	
12	Voința Vișina	34	13	3	18	76	101	−25	42	
13	Unirea Colibași	34	13	1	20	85	104	−19	40	
14	Unirea Bucșani	34	13	4	17	76	101	−25	40 (Note: Unirea Bucșani and Viitorul I.L. Caragiale deducted 3 points.)	
15	Luceafărul Dragomirești	34	11	2	21	66	127	−61	35	
16	Viitorul I.L. Caragiale (R)	34	7	5	22	57	135	−78	23	Relegation to Liga V Dâmbovița
17	Petrolul Târgoviște (R)	33	3	4	26	22	88	−66	13 (Note: Petrolul Târgoviște and Coada Izvorului withdrew and lost all matches from the second part of the season with 0–3.)	Relegation to Liga V Dâmbovița
18	Coada Izvorului (R)	33	1	2	30	21	115	−94	5	Relegation to Liga V Dâmbovița

Rules for classification: 1) Points; 2) Head-to-head points; 3) Head-to-head goal difference; 4) Head-to-head goals scored; 5) Head-to-head away goals scored; 6) Goal difference; 7) Goals scored.
(C) Champions; (Q) Qualified for the phase indicated; (R) Relegated

=== Dolj County ===
Team changes from the previous season

- FCU 1948 Craiova achieved promotion to Liga III.
- Progresul Băilești (10th place; withdrew) and Ajax Dobrotești (14th place) were relegated to Liga V Dolj.
- Vânătorul Desa (Series I winners) and Unirea Amărăștii de Jos (Series III winners) were promoted from Liga V Dolj.
- Viitorul Giurgița (Series II winners) and Viitorul Coțofenii din Dos (Series IV winners) declined promotion from Liga V Dolj.
- Unirea Vela was admitted upon request.
- Viitorul Cârcea was renamed CS Cârcea.

Pos	Team	Pld	W	D	L	GF	GA	GD	Pts	Qualification or relegation
1	Dunărea Calafat	26	18	4	4	69	34	+35	58	Qualification for championship play-off
2	Tractorul Cetate	26	16	6	4	77	37	+40	54	Qualification for championship play-off
3	Cârcea	26	17	1	8	86	38	+48	52	Qualification for championship play-off
4	Metropolitan Ișalnița	26	15	4	7	73	46	+27	49 (Note: Știința Danubius Bechet–Metropolitan Ișalnița 2–4; Metropolitan Ișalnița–Știința Danubius Bechet 1–3)	Qualification for championship play-off
5	Știința Danubius Bechet	26	15	4	7	77	51	+26	49	Qualification for championship play-off
6	Unirea Tricolor Dăbuleni	26	15	3	8	68	41	+27	48 (Note: Unirea Tricolor Dăbuleni–Jiul Podari 2–0; Jiul Podari–Unirea Tricolor Dăbuleni 3–1)	Qualification for championship play-off
7	Jiul Podari	26	14	6	6	72	38	+34	48	
8	Vânătorul Desa	26	10	6	10	58	53	+5	36	
9	Unirea Amărăștii de Jos	26	9	5	12	50	60	−10	32	
10	Victoria Plenița	26	9	3	14	54	68	−14	30	
11	Progresul Segarcea	26	9	0	17	52	80	−28	27	
12	Recolta Ostroveni	26	8	1	17	49	85	−36	25	
13	Flacăra Moțăței (R)	26	2	4	20	33	93	−60	10	Relegation to Liga V Dolj
14	Unirea Vela (R)	26	1	1	24	13	107	−94	4 (Note: Unirea Vela withdrew after 23 rounds.)	Relegation to Liga V Dolj

Rules for classification: 1) Points; 2) Head-to-head points; 3) Head-to-head goal difference; 4) Head-to-head goals scored; 5) Head-to-head away goals scored; 6) Goal difference; 7) Goals scored.
(R) Relegated
Notes:

Championship play-off

The championship play-off was contested between the top six teams of the regular season. The teams started the play-off with the points accumulated in the regular season, but only from matches against the other qualified teams.

Pos	Team	Pld	W	D	L	GF	GA	GD	Pts	Qualification
1	Tractorul Cetate (C, Q)	20	12	4	4	47	28	+19	40	Qualification for promotion play-off
2	Dunărea Calafat	20	12	3	5	45	33	+12	39	
3	Metropolitan Ișalnița	20	9	4	7	47	46	+1	31	
4	Cârcea	20	9	1	10	57	46	+11	28	
5	Știința Danubius Bechet	20	7	2	11	37	54	−17	23	
6	Unirea Tricolor Dăbuleni	20	2	4	14	35	61	−26	10	

Rules for classification: 1) Points; 2) Head-to-head points; 3) Head-to-head goal difference; 4) Head-to-head goals scored; 5) Head-to-head away goals scored; 6) Goal difference; 7) Goals scored.
(C) Champions; (Q) Qualified for the phase indicated

=== Galați County ===
Team changes from the previous season

- Voința Cudalbi (winners) was promoted from Liga V Galați.
- Mălina Smârdan (runners-up) declined promotion from Liga V Galați.
- Viitorul Umbrărești withdrew.
- Juventus Toflea (13th place) was spared from relegation.
- Victoria Tecuci was admitted upon request.

Pos	Team	Pld	W	D	L	GF	GA	GD	Pts	Qualification or relegation
1	CSU Galați (C, Q)	26	24	2	0	131	13	+118	74	Qualification to promotion play-off
2	Zimbrul Slobozia Conachi	26	21	5	0	137	35	+102	68	
3	Gloria Ivești	26	19	3	4	81	33	+48	60	
4	Unirea Braniștea	26	15	2	9	72	53	+19	47	
5	Muncitorul Ghidigeni	26	13	3	10	81	63	+18	42	
6	Quantum Club Galați	26	13	1	12	57	61	−4	40	
7	Victoria Tecuci	26	11	6	9	55	57	−2	39	
8	Victoria Independența	26	9	4	13	48	71	−23	31	
9	Voința Cudalbi	26	9	3	14	56	66	−10	30	
10	Avântul Vânători	26	7	6	13	44	65	−21	27	
11	Agrostar Tulucești	26	6	3	17	49	94	−45	21	
12	Avântul Drăgănești	26	6	2	18	53	95	−42	20	
13	Viitorul Costache Negri (R)	26	5	2	19	46	102	−56	17	Relegation to Liga V Galați
14	Juventus Toflea (R)	26	3	0	23	27	129	−102	9	Relegation to Liga V Galați

Rules for classification: 1) Points; 2) Head-to-head points; 3) Head-to-head goal difference; 4) Head-to-head goals scored; 5) Head-to-head away goals scored; 6) Goal difference; 7) Goals scored.
(C) Champions; (Q) Qualified for the phase indicated; (R) Relegated

=== Giurgiu County ===
Team changes from the previous season

- Maxima Hobaia (North Series winners) and Rapid Clejani (North Series runners-up) were promoted from Liga V Giurgiu
- Săbărelul Ciocoveni (South Series winners) and AS Scărișoara (South Series runners-up) declined promotion from Liga V Giurgiu.
- Progresul Valea Dragului AS Prundu, Olimpia Mârșa and Voința Podișor withdrew during the previous season.
- Pro Giurgiu, Unirea Frătești and Unirea Vânătorii Mici withdrew.
- Argeșul Hotarele, Gloria Comana and AS Podu Doamnei were admitted upon request.

South Series

Pos	Team	Pld	W	D	L	GF	GA	GD	Pts	Qualification
1	Mihai Bravu (Q)	26	24	1	1	116	14	+102	73	Qualification to championship play-offs
2	Energia Remuș (Q)	26	19	5	2	104	30	+74	62	Qualification to championship play-offs
3	Giganții Vărăști	26	17	3	6	100	60	+40	54	
4	Victoria Adunații-Copăceni	26	14	7	5	92	50	+42	49	
5	Argeșul Hotarele	26	14	5	7	66	55	+11	47	
6	Dunărea Giurgiu	26	12	4	10	67	47	+20	40	
7	Unirea Izvoarele	26	9	5	12	59	74	−15	32	
8	Voința Slobozia	26	9	3	14	59	91	−32	30	
9	Spicul Izvoru	26	7	8	11	58	48	+10	29	
10	Dunărea Oinacu	26	7	7	12	39	46	−7	28	
11	Real Colibași	26	7	2	17	64	100	−36	23 (Note: Following the decision of the Disciplinary Commission of 25.09.2018, the teams Gloria Comana and Real Colibași were penalized with losing the game by double forfeit.)	
12	Viitorul Vedea	26	5	6	15	33	86	−53	21	
13	Gloria Comana	26	5	1	20	31	105	−74	16	
14	Mihai Viteazul Călugăreni	26	3	1	22	23	111	−88	10	

Rules for classification: 1) Points; 2) Head-to-head points; 3) Head-to-head goal difference; 4) Head-to-head goals scored; 5) Head-to-head away goals scored; 6) Goal difference; 7) Goals scored.
(Q) Qualified for the phase indicated
Notes:

North Series

Pos	Team	Pld	W	D	L	GF	GA	GD	Pts	Qualification
1	Argeșul Mihăilești (Q)	28	24	1	3	128	36	+92	73	Qualification to championship play-offs
2	Singureni (Q)	28	21	3	4	111	46	+65	66	Qualification to championship play-offs
3	Bolintin Malu Spart	28	21	1	6	82	34	+48	64	
4	Avântul Florești	28	15	4	9	74	48	+26	49	
5	Bolintin-Deal	28	16	2	10	81	57	+24	50	
6	Maxima Hobaia	28	11	5	12	73	90	−17	38	
7	Luceafărul Trestieni	28	10	3	15	69	85	−16	33	
8	Viitorul Tântava	28	10	3	15	61	92	−31	33	
9	Zmeii Ogrezeni	28	9	4	15	68	77	−9	31	
10	Petrolul Roata de Jos	28	9	3	16	67	80	−13	30	
11	Iepurești	28	7	9	12	46	64	−18	30	
12	Unirea Cosoba	28	9	1	18	40	65	−25	28	
13	Silver Inter Zorile	28	9	1	18	58	89	−31	28	
14	Rapid Clejani	28	8	3	17	49	88	−39	27	
15	Podu Doamnei (R)	28	8	3	17	35	91	−56	27	Relegation to Liga V Giurgiu
16	Unirea Joița (D)	0	0	0	0	0	0	0	0 (Note: Unirea Joița withdrew after 8 rounds and all its results were canceled.)	Withdrew

Rules for classification: 1) Points; 2) Head-to-head points; 3) Head-to-head goal difference; 4) Head-to-head goals scored; 5) Head-to-head away goals scored; 6) Goal difference; 7) Goals scored.
(D) Disqualified; (Q) Qualified for the phase indicated; (R) Relegated
Notes:

Championship play-offs

The championship play-offs were contested between the two best-ranked teams in each series of the regular season. All matches were played at Ion Mangeac Stadium in Izvoarele: the semi-finals on 4 and 5 June, and the final on 8 June 2019.

Semi-finals

Team 1	Score	Team 2
Mihai Bravu	1–0	Singureni
Argeșul Mihăilești	1–1 (a.e.t.) (5–3 p)	Energia Remuș

Final

Team 1	Score	Team 2
Mihai Bravu	0–0 (4–2 p)	Argeșul Mihăilești

Mihai Bravu won the Liga IV Giurgiu County and qualified for the promotion play-off in Liga III.

=== Gorj County ===
Team changes from previous season

- Internațional Bălești was relegated from Liga III.
- AS Aninoasa (winners) and Gilortul Bengești (runners-up) declined promotion from Liga V Gorj.
- Energetica Tismana and AS Stejari withdrew.
- Știința Hurezani (15th place) and Petrolul Stoina (16th place) were spared from relegation.
- Știința Flacăra Roșia de Amaradia was admitted upon request.

Pos	Team	Pld	W	D	L	GF	GA	GD	Pts	Qualification or relegation
1	Gilortul Târgu Cărbunești (C, Q)	30	23	3	4	73	20	+53	72	Qualification to promotion play-off
2	Știința Turceni	30	22	4	4	106	24	+82	70	
3	Petrolul Bustuchin	30	22	3	5	102	30	+72	69	
4	Vulturii Fărcășești	30	20	5	5	122	34	+88	65	
5	Petrolul Țicleni	30	19	4	7	86	36	+50	61	
6	Jiul Rovinari	30	16	9	5	67	25	+42	57	
7	Unirea Crușeț	30	17	5	8	75	47	+28	56	
8	Internațional Bălești	30	16	5	9	90	55	+35	53	
9	Novaci	30	10	7	13	80	64	+16	37	
10	Știința Hurezani	30	10	3	17	61	93	−32	33	
11	Parângul Bumbești-Jiu	30	10	1	19	55	71	−16	31	
12	Viitorul Negomir	30	8	2	20	49	115	−66	26	
13	Avântul Baia de Fier	30	6	5	19	42	89	−47	23	
14	Minerul II Mătăsari	30	4	4	22	40	90	−50	16	
15	Știința Flacăra Roșia de Amaradia (R)	30	3	2	25	28	190	−162	11	Relegation to Liga V Gorj
16	Petrolul Stoina (R)	30	3	0	27	20	113	−93	9	Relegation to Liga V Gorj

Rules for classification: 1) Points; 2) Head-to-head points; 3) Head-to-head goal difference; 4) Head-to-head goals scored; 5) Head-to-head away goals scored; 6) Goal difference; 7) Goals scored.
(C) Champions; (Q) Qualified for the phase indicated; (R) Relegated

=== Harghita County ===
The Liga IV Harghita County was contested by twenty-two teams divided into two series, the West Series with 14 teams, played in a double round-robin format, and the East Series with 8 teams, played in a double round-robin regular season followed by play-off and play-out rounds in which teams started with half of their points accumulated during the regular season. The winners of each series qualified for the championship final.

Team changes from previous season

- AS Tulgheș was excluded during the previous season.
- Unirea Lueta, Sporting Odorheiu Secuiesc, Farkaslaka Lupeni, Tineretul Morăreni, Metalul Vlăhița, Andycom Avrămești, Galambfalva Porumbenii Mari, Tartód Vârșag, Agyagfalvi Lendület Lutița, Bradul Zetea, and Târnava Mare Betești from the Odorhei Zone, as well as Ezüstfenyő Ciceu, ACS Sânsimion, Fișag Ciucsângeorgiu, and ACS Sândominic from the Ciuc Zone, were all promoted from Liga V Harghita.

West Series

Pos	Team	Pld	W	D	L	GF	GA	GD	Pts	Qualification or relegation
1	Galambfalva Porumbenii Mari (Q)	26	19	2	5	66	36	+30	59	Qualification to championship final
2	Unirea Cristuru Secuiesc	26	17	3	6	92	40	+52	54	
3	Unirea Lueta	26	17	2	7	59	37	+22	53	
4	Roseal Odorheiu Secuiesc	26	13	6	7	49	28	+21	45	
5	Farkaslaka Lupeni	26	13	3	10	64	46	+18	42	
6	Tineretul Morăreni	26	12	4	10	60	61	−1	40	
7	Sporting Odorheiu Secuiesc	26	11	5	10	66	76	−10	38	
8	Bradul Zetea	26	11	3	12	42	45	−3	36	
9	Homorod Merești	26	10	3	13	65	72	−7	33	
10	Agyagfalvi Lendület Lutița	26	8	8	10	55	50	+5	32	
11	Metalul Vlăhița	26	10	2	14	53	64	−11	32	
12	Andycom Avrămești	26	6	3	17	49	83	−34	21	
13	Târnava Mare Betești (R)	26	5	5	16	34	67	−33	20	Relegation to Liga V Harghita
14	Tartód Vârşag (R)	26	4	3	19	37	86	−49	15	Relegation to Liga V Harghita

Rules for classification: 1) Points; 2) Head-to-head points; 3) Head-to-head goal difference; 4) Head-to-head goals scored; 5) Head-to-head away goals scored; 6) Goal difference; 7) Goals scored.
(Q) Qualified for the phase indicated; (R) Relegated

East Series

Pos	Team	Pld	W	D	L	GF	GA	GD	Pts	Qualification
1	Gheorgheni	14	11	0	3	57	21	+36	33	Qualification to East Series play-off
2	Sânsimion	14	9	2	3	34	21	+13	29	Qualification to East Series play-off
3	Pro Mureșul Toplița	14	9	1	4	40	28	+12	28	Qualification to East Series play-off
4	Minerul Bălan	14	7	2	5	28	26	+2	23	Qualification to East Series play-off
5	Sândominic	14	6	4	4	46	25	+21	22	Qualification to East Series play-off
6	Ezüstfenyő Ciceu	14	4	2	8	25	49	−24	14	Qualification to East Series play-out
7	Bastya Lăzarea	14	2	2	10	26	52	−26	8	Qualification to East Series play-out
8	Fișag Ciucsângeorgiu	14	1	1	12	13	47	−34	4	Qualification to East Series play-out

Rules for classification: 1) Points; 2) Head-to-head points; 3) Head-to-head goal difference; 4) Head-to-head goals scored; 5) Head-to-head away goals scored; 6) Goal difference; 7) Goals scored.

East Series play-off

Pos	Team	Pld	W	D	L	GF	GA	GD	Pts	Qualification
1	Gheorgheni (Q)	8	7	1	0	37	14	+23	39	Qualification to championship final
2	Sânsimion	8	3	1	4	20	23	−3	25	
3	Pro Mureșul Toplița	8	3	1	4	14	21	−7	24	
4	Sândominic	8	3	0	5	16	27	−11	20	
5	Minerul Bălan	8	2	1	5	10	12	−2	19	

Rules for classification: 1) Points; 2) Head-to-head points; 3) Head-to-head goal difference; 4) Head-to-head goals scored; 5) Head-to-head away goals scored; 6) Goal difference; 7) Goals scored.
(Q) Qualified for the phase indicated

East Series play-out

Pos	Team	Pld	W	D	L	GF	GA	GD	Pts	Qualification
6	Ezüstfenyő Ciceu	4	1	2	1	7	8	−1	12	
7	Bastya Lăzarea	4	2	1	1	12	6	+6	11	
8	Fișag Ciucsângeorgiu (R)	4	1	1	2	9	14	−5	6	Relegation to Liga V Harghita

Rules for classification: 1) Points; 2) Head-to-head points; 3) Head-to-head goal difference; 4) Head-to-head goals scored; 5) Head-to-head away goals scored; 6) Goal difference; 7) Goals scored.
(R) Relegated

Championship final

Team 1	Agg.	Team 2	1st leg	2nd leg
Gheorgheni	8–1	Galambfalva Porumbenii Mari	6–0	2–1

Gheorgheni won the Liga IV Harghita County and qualified for the promotion play-off in Liga III.

=== Hunedoara County ===
Team changes from the previous season

- CS Hunedoara achieved promotion to Liga III.
- Măgura Pui (winners) and Zarandu Crișcior (runners-up) declined promotion from Liga V Hunedoara .
- Hercules Lupeni and Aurul Certej withdrew.
- Universitatea Petroșani (14th place) and Cetate Deva II (15th place) were spared from relegation.

Pos	Team	Pld	W	D	L	GF	GA	GD	Pts	Qualification or relegation
1	Retezatul Hațeg (C, Q)	22	17	3	2	83	31	+52	54	Qualification to promotion play-off
2	Inter Petrila	22	15	4	3	85	21	+64	49	
3	Vulcan	22	14	5	3	65	18	+47	47 (Note: Aurul–Vulcan 0–0; Vulcan–Aurul 2–0)	
4	Aurul Brad	22	14	5	3	57	28	+29	47	
5	Gloria Geoagiu	22	13	5	4	73	23	+50	44	
6	Șoimul Băița	22	12	4	6	58	30	+28	40	
7	Dacia Orăștie	22	10	3	9	42	42	0	33	
8	Minerul Uricani	22	5	4	13	28	49	−21	19	
9	Jiul Petroșani	22	4	3	15	33	61	−28	15	
10	Cetate Deva II	22	4	2	16	24	90	−66	14	
11	Universitatea Petroșani	22	2	1	19	16	89	−73	7	
12	Victoria Călan	22	1	3	18	15	97	−82	6	

Rules for classification: 1) Points; 2) Head-to-head points; 3) Head-to-head goal difference; 4) Head-to-head goals scored; 5) Head-to-head away goals scored; 6) Goal difference; 7) Goals scored.
(C) Champions; (Q) Qualified for the phase indicated

=== Ialomița County ===
Team changes from the previous season

- Spicul Colilia (16th place) was relegated to Liga V Ialomița.
- Unirea Grivița (Series I winners) was promoted from Liga V Ialomița.
- Olimpia Rădulești and Unirea Scânteia withdrew and were replaced by Recolta Bărcănești and Voința Maia.
- Rapid Fetești was renamed CSM Fetești and bought the place of newly promoted Fulgerul Fierbinți (Series II winners).

Pos	Team	Pld	W	D	L	GF	GA	GD	Pts	Qualification or relegation
1	Recolta Gheorghe Doja (C, Q)	30	23	4	3	108	27	+81	73	Qualification to promotion play-off
2	Victoria Munteni-Buzău	30	21	2	7	98	38	+60	65 (Note: Victoria Munteni-Buzău–Bărăganul Ciulnița 2–3; Bărăganul Ciulnița–Victoria Munteni-Buzău 2–4)	
3	Bărăganul Ciulnița	30	21	2	7	127	52	+75	65	
4	Secunda Adâncata	30	18	5	7	91	42	+49	59	
5	Urziceni	30	16	5	9	86	31	+55	53 (Note: Victoria Țăndărei–Urziceni 2–0; Urziceni–Victoria Țăndărei 5–2)	
6	Victoria Țăndărei	30	17	2	11	81	57	+24	53	
7	Viitorul Axintele	30	16	3	11	92	63	+29	51	
8	Abatorul Slobozia	30	16	2	12	79	50	+29	50	
9	Fetești	30	13	3	14	48	47	+1	42	
10	Spartacus Iazu	30	12	5	13	93	88	+5	41	
11	Amara	30	10	1	19	61	117	−56	31	
12	Unirea Ion Roată	30	9	2	19	33	98	−65	29	
13	Recolta Gheorghe Lazăr	30	7	5	18	69	103	−34	26	
14	Unirea Grivița	30	7	4	19	44	102	−58	25	
15	Recolta Bărcănești	30	7	0	23	45	117	−72	21	Spared from relegation (Note: Recolta Bărcănești was spared from relegation due to the promotion of Recolta Gheorghe Doja in Liga III.)
16	Voința Maia (R)	30	4	1	25	47	170	−123	13	Relegation to Liga V Ialomița

Rules for classification: 1) Points; 2) Head-to-head points; 3) Head-to-head goal difference; 4) Head-to-head goals scored; 5) Head-to-head away goals scored; 6) Goal difference; 7) Goals scored.
(C) Champions; (Q) Qualified for the phase indicated; (R) Relegated

=== Iași County ===
Team changes from the previous season

- Viitorul Lungani (14th place), Voința Moțca (15th place) and Gloria Balș (16th place) were relegated to Liga V Iași.
- Poly 2014 Iași (Series II winners) and Progresul Deleni (Series III winners) were promoted from Liga V Iași.
- Avântul Golăiești (Series I winners) declined promotion from Liga V Iași.
- Steaua Magică Iași withdrew.
- Știința Miroslava II and Gloria Românești were admitted upon request.

Pos	Team	Pld	W	D	L	GF	GA	GD	Pts	Qualification or relegation
1	Moldova Cristești (C, Q)	28	21	4	3	76	32	+44	67	Qualification to promotion play-off
2	Unirea Mircești	28	20	6	2	100	27	+73	66 (Note: Unirea Mircești–Flacăra Erbiceni 3–3; Flacăra Erbiceni–Unirea Mircești 1–1.)	
3	Flacăra Erbiceni	28	20	6	2	72	26	+46	66	
4	Unirea Ruginoasa	28	17	5	6	78	33	+45	56	
5	Stejarul Bârnova	28	13	3	12	67	65	+2	42	
6	Stejarul Sinești	28	12	2	14	72	68	+4	38 (Note: Victoria Lețcani–Stejarul Sinești 3–7; Stejarul Sinești–Victoria Lețcani 4–2.)	
7	Victoria Lețcani	28	12	2	14	74	62	+12	38	
8	Gloria Bălțați	28	12	1	15	52	42	+10	37	
9	Tomești	28	11	3	14	54	58	−4	36	
10	Viitorul Hârlau	28	10	5	13	45	56	−11	35	
11	Progresul Deleni	28	10	4	14	55	53	+2	34	
12	Ciurea	28	10	3	15	57	73	−16	33	
13	Unirea Scânteia	28	9	4	15	42	73	−31	31	
14	Gloria Românești (R)	28	4	6	18	41	76	−35	18	Relegation to Liga V Iași
15	Poly 2014 Iași (R)	28	2	0	26	26	167	−141	6	Relegation to Liga V Iași
16	Știința Miroslava II (Note: Știința Miroslava II withdrew in the first part of the season and all its results were canceled.) (D)	0	0	0	0	0	0	0	0	Withdrew

Rules for classification: 1) Points; 2) Head-to-head points; 3) Head-to-head goal difference; 4) Head-to-head goals scored; 5) Head-to-head away goals scored; 6) Goal difference; 7) Goals scored.
(C) Champions; (D) Disqualified; (Q) Qualified for the phase indicated; (R) Relegated

=== Ilfov County ===
Team changes from the previous season

- CSO Bragadiru was relegated from Liga III.
- Voința Buftea (9th place, Series I), Metalplast Jilava (10th place, Series I), Viitorul Domnești II (11th place, Series I), Speranța Săbăreni (8th place, Series II), Gloria Buriaș (9th place, Series II), Viitorul Găneasa (10th place, Series II), Frăția București (11th place, Series II) and CS Dărăști (12th place, Series II; excluded) were relegated to Liga V Ilfov.
- ACS Cornetu and Pescărușul Grădiștea withdrew.
- Viitorul Berceni was renamed CS Berceni.

Pos	Team	Pld	W	D	L	GF	GA	GD	Pts	Qualification or relegation
1	Viitorul Pantelimon (C, Q)	22	13	4	5	65	37	+28	43 (Note: Măgurele–Viitorul Pantelimon 1–1; Viitorul Pantelimon–Măgurele 4–0)	Qualification to promotion play-off
2	Măgurele	22	13	4	5	60	32	+28	43	
3	Viitorul Dragomirești-Vale	22	12	6	4	63	35	+28	42	
4	Ciorogârla	22	12	5	5	56	37	+19	41	
5	Periș	22	10	4	8	54	45	+9	34	
6	Vulturii Pasărea	22	10	3	9	68	64	+4	33	
7	Voluntari III	22	8	6	8	66	66	0	30 (Note: Voluntari III–Unirea Dobroești 5–3; Unirea Dobroești–Voluntari III 3–2)	
8	Unirea Dobroești	22	8	6	8	57	47	+10	30	
9	Athletico Floreasca	22	9	1	12	64	60	+4	28	
10	Berceni	22	7	3	12	50	56	−6	24	
11	Viitorul Petrăchioaia (R)	22	6	4	12	40	48	−8	22	Relegation to Liga V Ilfov
12	Gloria Islaz (R)	22	0	2	20	18	134	−116	2	Relegation to Liga V Ilfov

Rules for classification: 1) Points; 2) Head-to-head points; 3) Head-to-head goal difference; 4) Head-to-head goals scored; 5) Head-to-head away goals scored; 6) Goal difference; 7) Goals scored.
(C) Champions; (Q) Qualified for the phase indicated; (R) Relegated

=== Maramureș County ===
Team changes from the previous season

- Minaur Baia Mare achieved promotion to Liga III.
- Viitorul Culcea-Săcălășeni (Series I winners) and ACS Satu Nou de Jos (Series II winners) declined promotion from Liga V Maramureș.
- Foresta Câmpulung la Tisa withdrew.
- AS Nistru was admitted upon request.
- Luceafărul Strâmtura withdrew before the start of the season.

South Series

Pos	Team	Pld	W	D	L	GF	GA	GD	Pts	Qualification or relegation
1	Viitorul Ulmeni (Q)	18	17	0	1	102	16	+86	51	Qualification to championship final
2	Progresul Șomcuta Mare	18	16	0	2	92	12	+80	48	
3	Lăpușul Târgu Lăpuș	18	9	4	5	75	37	+38	31	
4	Unirea Șișești	18	10	0	8	48	48	0	30	
5	Suciu de Sus	18	8	2	8	38	46	−8	26	
6	Fărcașa	18	6	5	7	31	37	−6	23	
7	Bradul Groșii Țibleșului	18	5	4	9	34	56	−22	19	
8	Progresul Dumbrăvița	18	3	5	10	29	59	−30	14	
9	Nistru	18	3	1	14	33	111	−78	10	
10	Seini	18	2	1	15	15	75	−60	7	
11	Comuna Satulung (D)	0	0	0	0	0	0	0	0 (Note: Comuna Satulung withdrew.)	Withdrew

Rules for classification: 1) Points; 2) Head-to-head points; 3) Head-to-head goal difference; 4) Head-to-head goals scored; 5) Head-to-head away goals scored; 6) Goal difference; 7) Goals scored.
(D) Disqualified; (Q) Qualified for the phase indicated
Notes:

North Series

Pos	Team	Pld	W	D	L	GF	GA	GD	Pts	Qualification or relegation
1	Avântul Bârsana (Q)	16	16	0	0	75	19	+56	48	Qualification to championship final
2	Plimob Sighetu Marmației	16	10	1	5	56	34	+22	31	
3	Recolta Săliștea de Sus	16	10	0	6	55	39	+16	30	
4	Zorile Moisei	16	9	1	6	50	36	+14	28	
5	Iza Dragomirești	16	7	1	8	48	42	+6	22	
6	Bradul Vișeu de Sus	16	7	0	9	27	40	−13	21	
7	Remeți	16	4	0	12	25	44	−19	12	
8	Salina Ocna Șugatag	16	3	3	10	30	58	−28	12	
9	Metalul Bogdan Vodă	16	3	0	13	19	73	−54	9	
10	Luceafărul Strâmtura (D)	0	0	0	0	0	0	0	0 (Note: Luceafărul Strâmtura withdrew before the start of the season.)	Withdrew

Rules for classification: 1) Points; 2) Head-to-head points; 3) Head-to-head goal difference; 4) Head-to-head goals scored; 5) Head-to-head away goals scored; 6) Goal difference; 7) Goals scored.
(D) Disqualified; (Q) Qualified for the phase indicated
Notes:

Championship final

The matches were played on 25 May and 1 June 2019.

Team 1	Agg.	Team 2	1st leg	2nd leg
Avântul Bârsana	2–8	Viitorul Ulmeni	1–3	1–5

Viitorul Ulmeni won the Liga IV Maramureș County and qualified for the promotion play-off in Liga III.

=== Mehedinți County ===
Team changes from the previous season

- AS Corcova (10th place; withdrew) was relegated to Liga V Mehedinți.
- Știința Broșteni (winners) and Inter Crăguiești (runners-up) declined promotion from Liga V Mehedinți.
- Pandurii Cerneți, AS Obârșia de Câmp and AS Turnu Severin were admitted upon request.
- Real Vânju Mare was renamed Victoria Vânju Mare.

Pos	Team	Pld	W	D	L	GF	GA	GD	Pts	Qualification or relegation
1	Strehaia (C, Q)	22	19	1	2	67	9	+58	58	Qualification to promotion play-off
2	Viitorul Șimian	22	18	3	1	73	8	+65	57	
3	Recolta Dănceu	22	17	2	3	69	24	+45	53	
4	Pandurii Cerneți	22	14	3	5	57	37	+20	45	
5	Dierna Orșova	22	11	1	10	38	38	0	34	
6	Decebal Eșelnița	22	8	2	12	36	32	+4	26	
7	Victoria Vânju Mare	22	8	2	12	32	57	−25	26	
8	Inter Salcia	22	8	0	14	43	43	0	24	
9	Obârșia de Câmp	22	6	1	15	27	43	−16	19	
10	Viitorul Cujmir	22	3	5	14	35	106	−71	14	
11	Turnu Severin	22	3	4	15	32	72	−40	13	
12	Dunărea Pristol	22	3	2	17	18	64	−46	11	

Rules for classification: 1) Points; 2) Head-to-head points; 3) Head-to-head goal difference; 4) Head-to-head goals scored; 5) Head-to-head away goals scored; 6) Goal difference; 7) Goals scored.
(C) Champions; (Q) Qualified for the phase indicated

=== Mureș County ===
Team changes from the previous season

- MSE 08 Târgu Mureș achieved promotion to Liga III.
- Avântul Miheșu de Câmpie (15th place) was relegated to Liga V Mureș.
- Nyarad Eremitu (North Series winners), Farel Roteni (Center Series winners) and CS Iernut II (South Series winners) declined promotion from Liga V Mureș.
- Gaz Metan Târgu Mureș and Unirea Tricolor Târnăveni withdrew.
- CSM Târgu Mureș, Unirea Ungheni and CSM Sighișoara were admitted upon request.
- Mureșul Nazna was renamed Sâncrai Nazna.

Pos	Team	Pld	W	D	L	GF	GA	GD	Pts	Qualification or relegation
1	Târgu Mureș (C, Q)	26	26	0	0	179	16	+163	78	Qualification to promotion play-off
2	Mureșul Luduș	26	20	4	2	104	30	+74	64	
3	Unirea Ungheni	26	17	7	2	127	31	+96	58	
4	Mureșul Rușii-Munți	26	14	4	8	90	54	+36	46	
5	Sovata	26	12	5	9	55	55	0	41	
6	Rază de Soare Acățari	26	12	5	9	49	53	−4	41	
7	Atletic Târgu Mureș	26	10	6	10	81	72	+9	36	
8	Sighișoara	26	9	6	11	70	58	+12	33	
9	Mureșul Cuci	26	8	3	15	55	97	−42	27	
10	Sâncrai Nazna	26	7	5	14	49	81	−32	26	
11	Viitorul Ungheni	26	8	1	17	52	96	−44	25	
12	Miercurea Nirajului	26	6	4	16	51	79	−28	22	
13	Sărmașu	26	6	4	16	35	112	−77	22	
14	Gaz Metan Daneș (R)	26	0	0	26	21	184	−163	0	Relegation to Liga V Mureș

Rules for classification: 1) Points; 2) Head-to-head points; 3) Head-to-head goal difference; 4) Head-to-head goals scored; 5) Head-to-head away goals scored; 6) Goal difference; 7) Goals scored.
(C) Champions; (Q) Qualified for the phase indicated; (R) Relegated

=== Neamț County ===
Team changes from the previous season

- Ceahlăul Piatra Neamț achieved promotion to Liga III.
- Zimbrul Vânători-Neamț, Voința Ion Creangă, Cimentul Bicaz and Steel Man Târgu Neamț withdrew.
- Energia Pângărați and Ozana Târgu Neamț were admitted upon request.

Pos	Team	Pld	W	D	L	GF	GA	GD	Pts	Qualification or relegation
1	Speranța Răucești	20	13	4	3	78	25	+53	43	Qualification to championship play-off
2	Bradu Borca	20	14	4	2	109	36	+73	46	Qualification to championship play-off
3	Ozana Târgu Neamț	20	12	5	3	58	21	+37	41	Qualification to championship play-off
4	Victoria Horia	20	8	3	9	51	45	+6	27	Qualification to championship play-off
5	Moldova Cordun	20	5	0	15	45	84	−39	15	
6	Energia Pângărați	20	0	0	20	15	145	−130	0	

Rules for classification: 1) Points; 2) Head-to-head points; 3) Head-to-head goal difference; 4) Head-to-head goals scored; 5) Head-to-head away goals scored; 6) Goal difference; 7) Goals scored.

Championship play-off

The championship play-off was played in a double round-robin format between the best four teams of the regular season. The teams started with half of the points accumulated during the regular season.

Pos	Team	Pld	W	D	L	GF	GA	GD	Pts	Qualification
1	Ozana Târgu Neamț (C, Q)	6	5	0	1	18	5	+13	36	Qualification to promotion play-off
2	Bradu Borca	6	3	0	3	12	10	+2	31	
3	Speranța Răucești	6	2	1	3	7	12	−5	29	
4	Victoria Horia	6	1	1	4	7	17	−10	18	

Rules for classification: 1) Points; 2) Head-to-head points; 3) Head-to-head goal difference; 4) Head-to-head goals scored; 5) Head-to-head away goals scored; 6) Goal difference; 7) Goals scored.
(C) Champions; (Q) Qualified for the phase indicated

=== Olt County ===
Team changes from the previous season

- Avântul Oporelu (Series I winners), Viitorul Leotești (Series II winners), Victoria Cezieni (Series III winners) and Dunărea Corabia (Series IV winners) declined promotion from Liga V Olt.
- CSM Slatina, Unirea Radomirești, Oltul Slătioara, Viitorul Băleasa, Academica Balș and Victoria Dobrun were admitted upon request.

Pos	Team	Pld	W	D	L	GF	GA	GD	Pts	Qualification or relegation
1	Slatina (C, Q)	34	34	0	0	175	12	+163	102	Qualification to promotion play-off
2	Oltul Curtișoara	34	26	2	6	120	37	+83	80	
3	Petrolul Potcoava	34	26	2	6	129	40	+89	80	
4	Unirea Radomirești	34	23	4	7	100	45	+55	73	
5	Voința Băbiciu	34	22	6	6	88	39	+49	72	
6	Oltețul Osica	34	21	3	10	85	53	+32	66	
7	Oltul Slătioara	34	16	8	10	96	61	+35	56	
8	Viitorul Osica de Jos	34	17	2	15	81	67	+14	53	
9	Viitorul Grădinile	34	15	8	11	76	74	+2	53	
10	Viitorul Rusănești	34	17	2	15	83	87	−4	53	
11	Vedița Colonești	34	16	0	18	86	77	+9	48	
12	Viitorul Băleasa	34	11	4	19	63	111	−48	37	
13	Voința Schitu	34	11	3	20	67	113	−46	36	
14	Olt Scornicești	34	7	2	25	50	140	−90	23	
15	Academica Balș (R)	34	6	1	27	37	108	−71	19 (Note: The matches Academica Balș–Victoria Dobrun and Victoria Dobrun–Avântul Coteana have been approved with a double forfeit.)	Relegation to Liga V Olt
16	Recolta Stoicănești (R)	34	5	0	29	36	140	−104	15	Relegation to Liga V Olt
17	Avântul Coteana (R)	34	3	1	30	22	122	−100	10	Relegation to Liga V Olt
18	Victoria Dobrun (R)	34	3	0	31	16	102	−86	9	Relegation to Liga V Olt
19	Vedea Văleni Nicolae Titulescu (D)	0	0	0	0	0	0	0	0 (Note: Vedea Văleni Nicolae Titulescu withdrew from championship after 14 rounds and all its results were canceled.)	Withdrew

Rules for classification: 1) Points; 2) Head-to-head points; 3) Head-to-head goal difference; 4) Head-to-head goals scored; 5) Head-to-head away goals scored; 6) Goal difference; 7) Goals scored.
(C) Champions; (D) Disqualified; (Q) Qualified for the phase indicated; (R) Relegated

=== Prahova County ===
Team changes from the previous season

- Unirea Teleajen Ploiești (15th place) and Măgura Slănic (16th place; withdrew) were relegated to Liga V Prahova.
- Tinerețea Izvoarele (winners) and AS Strejnic (runners-up) were promoted from Liga V Prahova.

Pos	Team	Pld	W	D	L	GF	GA	GD	Pts	Qualification or relegation
1	Blejoi (C, Q)	30	25	3	2	95	17	+78	78	Qualification to promotion play-off
2	Bănești-Urleta	30	19	7	4	92	31	+61	64	
3	Petrolistul Boldești	30	18	7	5	74	31	+43	61	
4	Cornu	30	19	4	7	71	41	+30	61	
5	Plopeni	30	18	5	7	85	24	+61	59	
6	Tricolorul Breaza	30	15	3	12	58	51	+7	48	
7	Brebu	30	13	8	9	57	47	+10	47	
8	Teleajenul Vălenii de Munte	30	14	5	11	44	37	+7	47	
9	Mănești 2013 Coada Izvorului	30	12	6	12	63	70	−7	42	
10	Păulești	30	12	3	15	56	50	+6	39	
11	Avântul Măneciu	30	11	2	17	45	62	−17	35	
12	Petrolul 95 Ploiești	30	9	2	19	40	76	−36	29	
13	Tinerețea Izvoarele	30	8	5	17	41	90	−49	29	
14	Unirea Urlați	30	7	6	17	39	54	−15	27	
15	Strejnic (Note: Strejnic was spared from relegation due to the promotion of Blejoi in Liga III.)	30	5	4	21	26	78	−52	19	Spared from relegation
16	Ceptura (Note: Ceptura withdrew from the championship and lost all matches from the second part of the season with 0–3.) (R)	30	0	0	30	15	142	−127	0	Relegation to Liga V Prahova

Rules for classification: 1) Points; 2) Head-to-head points; 3) Head-to-head goal difference; 4) Head-to-head goals scored; 5) Head-to-head away goals scored; 6) Goal difference; 7) Goals scored.
(C) Champions; (Q) Qualified for the phase indicated; (R) Relegated

=== Satu Mare County ===
Team changes from the previous season

- Twenty-eight teams were promoted as Liga IV Satu Mare was expanded to thirty-nine teams, divided into three series based on geographical criteria. However, only thirty-seven teams remained after FC Certeze and Dari Lipău withdrew.

Series A (Tur-Talna Zone)

Pos	Team	Pld	W	D	L	GF	GA	GD	Pts	Qualification or relegation
1	Talna Orașu Nou (Q)	22	19	3	0	120	19	+101	60	Qualification to final four
2	Energia Negrești-Oaș (Q)	22	20	0	2	95	21	+74	60	Qualification to play-in round
3	Turul Micula	22	14	1	7	69	36	+33	43	
4	Speranța Halmeu	22	13	3	6	65	42	+23	42	
5	Victoria Apa	22	10	3	9	59	35	+24	33	
6	Livada	22	9	3	10	31	44	−13	30	
7	Dacia Medieșu Aurit	21	8	4	9	36	45	−9	28	
8	Venus Dumbrava	22	7	3	12	45	67	−22	24	
9	Someșul Odoreu	22	7	1	14	39	71	−32	22	
10	Voința Lazuri	22	6	2	14	32	56	−24	20	
11	Sportul Botiz	21	4	2	15	29	84	−55	14	
12	Egri Sasok Agriș	22	1	1	20	18	118	−100	4	

Rules for classification: 1) Points; 2) Head-to-head points; 3) Head-to-head goal difference; 4) Head-to-head goals scored; 5) Head-to-head away goals scored; 6) Goal difference; 7) Goals scored.
(Q) Qualified for the phase indicated

Series B (Someș Zone)

Pos	Team	Pld	W	D	L	GF	GA	GD	Pts	Qualification or relegation
1	Satu Mare (Q)	22	22	0	0	108	4	+104	66	Qualification to final four
2	Știința Beltiug (Q)	22	16	1	5	81	29	+52	49	Qualification to play-in round
3	Crasna Moftinu Mic	22	15	2	5	76	27	+49	47	
4	Recolta Dorolț	22	14	2	6	87	30	+57	44	
5	Luceafărul Decebal	21	14	1	6	60	51	+9	43	
6	Voința Babța	21	13	1	7	64	55	+9	40	
7	Unirea Păulești	22	8	1	13	53	70	−17	25	
8	Someșul Oar	22	7	3	12	39	83	−44	24	
9	Cetate Ardud	22	7	1	14	44	60	−16	22	
10	Viitorul Vetiș	22	4	1	17	30	90	−60	13	
11	Voința Doba	22	3	1	18	26	103	−77	10	
12	Atletic Craidorolț	22	1	0	21	9	75	−66	3	

Rules for classification: 1) Points; 2) Head-to-head points; 3) Head-to-head goal difference; 4) Head-to-head goals scored; 5) Head-to-head away goals scored; 6) Goal difference; 7) Goals scored.
(Q) Qualified for the phase indicated

Series C (Crasna Zone)

Pos	Team	Pld	W	D	L	GF	GA	GD	Pts	Qualification or relegation
1	Căpleni (Q)	24	21	0	3	85	24	+61	63	Qualification to final four
2	Victoria Carei (Q)	24	20	1	3	83	16	+67	61	Qualification to play-in round
3	Fortuna Căpleni	24	16	2	6	55	26	+29	50	
4	Schamagosch Ciumești	24	16	1	7	52	42	+10	49	
5	Frohlich Foieni	24	12	2	10	39	36	+3	38	
6	Real Andrid	24	11	4	9	50	47	+3	37	
7	Recolta Sanislău	23	8	5	10	41	47	−6	29	
8	Schwaben Kalmandi Cămin	24	8	4	12	42	47	−5	28	
9	Unirea Pișcolt	24	7	3	14	44	52	−8	24	
10	Ghenci	24	6	4	14	36	66	−30	22	
11	Viitorul Lucăceni	24	6	3	15	31	73	−42	21	
12	Stăruința Berveni	23	5	5	13	31	61	−30	20	
13	Victoria Tiream	24	2	0	22	27	79	−52	6	

Rules for classification: 1) Points; 2) Head-to-head points; 3) Head-to-head goal difference; 4) Head-to-head goals scored; 5) Head-to-head away goals scored; 6) Goal difference; 7) Goals scored.
(Q) Qualified for the phase indicated

Play-in round

In the play-in round, the teams that finished in 2nd place in the three series competed. All matches were played at Daniel Prodan Stadium in Satu Mare on 27, 28, and 29 May 2019.

Pos	Team	Pld	W	D	L	GF	GA	GD	Pts	Qualification	BEL	CAR	ENO
1	Știința Beltiug (Q)	2	2	0	0	6	1	+5	6	Qualification to final four			1–5
2	Victoria Carei	2	1	0	1	2	1	+1	3		1–0		
3	Energia Negrești-Oaș	2	0	0	2	1	7	−6	0			0–2	

Legend: Blue = home team win; Yellow = draw; Red = away team win.
Rules for classification: 1) Points; 2) Head-to-head points; 3) Head-to-head goal difference; 4) Head-to-head goals scored; 5) Head-to-head away goals scored; 6) Goal difference; 7) Goals scored 8) Penalty kicks 8) Penalty kicks.
(Q) Qualified for the phase indicated

Final four
Semi-final

Team 1	Agg.	Team 2	1st leg	2nd leg
Talna Orașu Nou	4–3	Știința Beltiug	3–1	1–2
Satu Mare	9–0	Căpleni	8–0	1–0

Final

Team 1	Agg.	Team 2	1st leg	2nd leg
Talna Orașu Nou	2–4	Satu Mare	0–3	2–1

Satu Mare won the Liga IV Satu Mare County and qualified for the promotion play-off to Liga III.

=== Sălaj County ===
Team changes from the previous season

- CS Hida (14th place) was relegated to Liga V Sălaj.
- Someșul Someș-Odorhei (East Series winners) and Steaua Cosniciu (West Series runners-up) (Note: Voința Derșida, the West Series winners, declined promotion.) were promoted from Liga V Sălaj.
- Cetatea Buciumi withdrew.
- AS Chieșd (13th place) was spared from relegation.
- Benfica Ileanda was renamed AS Ileanda.
- Real Crișeni was renamed Ardealul Crișeni.

Pos	Team	Pld	W	D	L	GF	GA	GD	Pts	Qualification or relegation
1	Unirea Mirșid (C, Q)	24	21	1	2	92	22	+70	64	Qualification to promotion play-off
2	Dumbrava Gâlgău Almașului	24	20	1	3	105	28	+77	61	
3	Rapid Jibou	24	18	3	3	72	27	+45	57	
4	Sportul Șimleu Silvaniei	24	13	6	5	63	35	+28	45	
5	Barcău Nușfalău	24	12	5	7	65	55	+10	41	
6	Silvania Cehu Silvaniei	24	10	6	8	40	41	−1	36	
7	Someșul Someș-Odorhei	24	11	1	12	55	56	−1	34	
8	Ardealul Crișeni	24	8	2	14	39	61	−22	26	
9	Olimpic Bocșa	24	7	2	15	50	82	−32	23	
10	Chieșd	24	6	3	15	47	77	−30	21	
11	Ileanda	24	3	9	12	32	60	−28	18	
12	Steaua Cosniciu	24	6	0	18	28	73	−45	18	
13	Flacara Halmășd (Note: Flacăra Halmășd withdrew after 16 rounds and lost all remaining matches with 0–3.)	24	1	1	22	14	85	−71	4	
14	Crasna (D)	0	0	0	0	0	0	0	0 (Note: Crasna withdrew after 3 rounds and all its results were canceled.)	Withdrew

Rules for classification: 1) Points; 2) Head-to-head points; 3) Head-to-head goal difference; 4) Head-to-head goals scored; 5) Head-to-head away goals scored; 6) Goal difference; 7) Goals scored.
(C) Champions; (D) Disqualified; (Q) Qualified for the phase indicated

=== Sibiu County ===
Team changes from the previous season}

- Athletic Șura Mare (14th place) was relegated to Liga V Sibiu.
- FC Avrig II (Sibiu East Series winners), Gloria Loamneș (Sibiu West Series winners) and Dacia Ațel (Mediaș Series winners) declined promotion from Liga V Sibiu.
- FC Tălmaciu (12th place) and ASA Sibiu (13th place) were spared from relegation.
- Interstar Sibiu was admitted upon request.

Pos	Team	Pld	W	D	L	GF	GA	GD	Pts	Qualification or relegation
1	Viitorul Șelimbăr (C, Q)	26	24	2	0	124	11	+113	74	Qualification to promotion play-off
2	Măgura Cisnădie	26	21	3	2	127	24	+103	66	
3	Păltiniș Rășinari	26	19	3	4	107	39	+68	60	
4	Unirea Miercurea Sibiului	26	17	3	6	65	32	+33	54	
5	Sparta Mediaș	26	14	4	8	67	38	+29	46	
6	Progresul Terezian Sibiu	26	13	5	8	61	40	+21	44	
7	Voința Sibiu	26	10	2	14	54	78	−24	32	
8	Agnita	26	9	4	13	49	53	−4	31	
9	Copșa Mică	26	10	1	15	72	105	−33	31	
10	Bradu	26	7	3	16	50	73	−23	24	
11	Interstar Sibiu	26	7	2	17	36	66	−30	23	
12	Spicul Șeica Mare (Note: Spicul Șeica Mare was spared from relegation due to the promotion of Viitorul Șelimbăr in Liga III.)	26	6	2	18	45	110	−65	20	Spared from relegation
13	Tălmaciu (R)	26	5	1	20	35	75	−40	16	Relegation to Liga V Sibiu
14	ASA Sibiu (R)	26	2	1	23	27	175	−148	7	Relegation to Liga V Sibiu

Rules for classification: 1) Points; 2) Head-to-head points; 3) Head-to-head goal difference; 4) Head-to-head goals scored; 5) Head-to-head away goals scored; 6) Goal difference; 7) Goals scored.
(C) Champions; (Q) Qualified for the phase indicated; (R) Relegated

=== Suceava County ===
Team changes from the previous season

- Șomuz Fălticeni achieved promotion to Liga III.
- CS Gura Humorului (13th place) was relegated to Liga V Suceava.
- Viitorul Verești (East Series winners) and Vânătorul Dorna Cândrenilor (West Series winners) were promoted from Liga V Suceava.
- Foresta Suceava II withdrew.
- Recolta Fântânele (14th place) was spared from relegation.
- LPS Suceava, ASA Rarău Câmpulung Moldovenesc and Sporting Poieni Solca were admitted upon request.

Pos	Team	Pld	W	D	L	GF	GA	GD	Pts	Qualification or relegation
1	Viitorul Liteni (C, Q)	30	23	3	4	105	44	+61	72	Qualification to promotion play-off
2	Pojorâta	30	22	3	5	103	32	+71	69	
3	Juniorul Suceava	30	16	11	3	73	26	+47	59	
4	Progresul Frătăuții Vechi	30	18	4	8	85	51	+34	58	
5	Șomuzul Preutești	30	15	9	6	62	43	+19	54	
6	Siretul Dolhasca	30	16	4	10	98	47	+51	52	
7	Victoria Vatra Moldoviței	30	12	7	11	47	50	−3	43	
8	Viitorul Verești	30	11	9	10	77	69	+8	42	
9	Moldova Drăgușeni	30	13	3	14	65	57	+8	42	
10	LPS Suceava	30	10	7	13	58	64	−6	37	
11	Recolta Fântânele	30	10	3	17	61	69	−8	33	
12	Vânătorul Dorna Cândrenilor	30	8	5	17	41	90	−49	29	
13	Zimbrul Siret	30	8	4	18	32	60	−28	28	
14	ASA Rarău Câmpulung Moldovenesc (R)	30	7	4	19	44	82	−38	22 (Note: ASA Rarău Câmpulung Moldovenesc were deducted 3 points.)	Relegation to Liga V Suceava
15	Sporting Poieni Solca (R)	30	5	3	22	51	116	−65	18	Relegation to Liga V Suceava
16	Stejarul Cajvana (R)	30	5	3	22	59	161	−102	18	Relegation to Liga V Suceava

Rules for classification: 1) Points; 2) Head-to-head points; 3) Head-to-head goal difference; 4) Head-to-head goals scored; 5) Head-to-head away goals scored; 6) Goal difference; 7) Goals scored.
(C) Champions; (Q) Qualified for the phase indicated; (R) Relegated

=== Teleorman County ===
Team changes from the previous season

- Tineretul Siliștea (14th place), Unirea Petrolul Videle (15th place) and Viață Nouă Olteni (16th place; withdrew) were relegated to Liga V Teleorman.
- Victoria Lunca (Series II winners) and Voința Saelele 2017 (Series II runners-up and promotion play-off winners) (Note: Voința Saelele 2017 defeated Flacăra Călinești 2–1, the runners-up of Series I, in the promotion play-off.) were promoted from Liga V Teleorman.
- Avântul Stejarul (Series I winners) declined promotion from Liga V Teleorman.
- ASC Seaca and CS Nanov withdrew.
- Unirea Moșteni and Unirea Brânceni were admitted upon request.

Pos	Team	Pld	W	D	L	GF	GA	GD	Pts	Qualification or relegation
1	Unirea Brânceni (C, Q)	28	23	2	3	129	31	+98	71	Qualification to promotion play-off
2	Rapid Buzescu	28	21	3	4	99	33	+66	66	
3	Unirea Țigănești	28	17	7	4	68	31	+37	58	
4	Ajax Botoroaga	28	17	5	6	94	40	+54	56	
5	Astra Plosca	28	12	5	11	66	62	+4	41	
6	Drăgănești-Vlașca	28	10	8	10	58	56	+2	38	
7	Avântul Bragadiru	28	11	5	12	77	78	−1	38	
8	Dunărea Zimnicea	28	12	2	14	49	68	−19	38	
9	Voința Saelele 2017	28	12	5	11	72	48	+24	37 (Note: Voința Saelele 2017 and Atletic Orbeasca were deducted 4 points.)	
10	Metalul Peretu	28	11	3	14	44	62	−18	36	
11	Victoria Lunca	28	9	5	14	59	92	−33	32	
12	Alexandria II	28	9	4	15	42	54	−12	31	
13	Viitorul Butești	28	9	1	18	45	95	−50	28	
14	Unirea Moșteni (R)	28	6	3	19	47	109	−62	21	Relegation to Liga V Teleorman
15	Atletic Orbeasca (R)	28	1	2	25	32	122	−90	1	Relegation to Liga V Teleorman

Rules for classification: 1) Points; 2) Head-to-head points; 3) Head-to-head goal difference; 4) Head-to-head goals scored; 5) Head-to-head away goals scored; 6) Goal difference; 7) Goals scored.
(C) Champions; (Q) Qualified for the phase indicated; (R) Relegated

=== Timiș County ===
Team changes from the previous season

- ACS Dumbrăvița achieved promotion to Liga III.
- Voința Biled (17th place) and Progresul Gătaia (18th place) were relegated to Liga V Timiș.
- Fortuna Becicherecu Mic (Series I winners), Flacăra Parța (Series II winners) and CSC Dudeștii Noi (Series III winners) were promoted from Liga V Timiș.
- Pobeda Dudeștii Vechi was renamed Pobeda Stár Bišnov.

Pos	Team	Pld	W	D	L	GF	GA	GD	Pts	Qualification or relegation
1	Fortuna Becicherecu Mic (C, Q)	32	26	5	1	93	17	+76	83	Qualification to promotion play-off
2	Carani Murani	32	23	5	4	90	42	+48	74	
3	Avântul Periam	32	17	8	7	84	48	+36	59	
4	Pobeda Stár Bišnov	32	18	5	9	68	37	+31	59	
5	Dudeștii Noi	32	18	3	11	48	34	+14	57	
6	Unirea Tomnatic	32	17	6	9	69	46	+23	57	
7	Unirea Sânnicolau Mare	32	13	8	11	59	49	+10	47	
8	Progresul Ciacova	32	13	7	12	53	49	+4	46	
9	Seceani	32	12	6	14	58	67	−9	42	
10	Deta	32	11	5	16	68	71	−3	38	
11	Peciu Nou	32	11	5	16	41	54	−13	38	
12	Timișul Șag	32	10	7	15	53	68	−15	37	
13	Voința Mașloc	32	9	7	16	45	70	−25	34	
14	Cocoșul Orțișoara	32	9	6	17	59	65	−6	33	
15	Flacăra Parța (R)	32	7	7	18	41	77	−36	28	Relegation to Liga V Timiș
16	Făget (R)	32	5	3	24	35	100	−65	18	Relegation to Liga V Timiș
17	Bazoșu Vechi (R)	32	4	5	23	24	94	−70	17	Relegation to Liga V Timiș
18	Lugoj II (D)	0	0	0	0	0	0	0	0 (Note: Lugoj II withdrew after 7 rounds and all its results were canceled.)	Withdrew

Rules for classification: 1) Points; 2) Head-to-head points; 3) Head-to-head goal difference; 4) Head-to-head goals scored; 5) Head-to-head away goals scored; 6) Goal difference; 7) Goals scored.
(C) Champions; (D) Disqualified; (Q) Qualified for the phase indicated; (R) Relegated

=== Tulcea County ===
The Liga IV Tulcea County was played in a double round-robin format, with the top four teams qualifying for the championship play-off, which was contested in a double round-robin format. Each team started the play-off with half of the points accumulated during the first stage of the season.

Team changes from the previous season

- Laguna Ceamurlia de Jos was renamed Ceres Min Ceamurlia de Jos.
- Arrubium Măcin, Luceafărul Slava Cercheză, Triumf Cerna, Săgeata Stejaru, Delta Aegyssus Tulcea and Gloria Agighiol withdrew.

Pos	Team	Pld	W	D	L	GF	GA	GD	Pts	Qualification or relegation
1	Pescărușul Sarichioi	18	17	1	0	119	18	+101	52	Qualification to championship play-off
2	Flacăra Mihail Kogălniceanu	18	14	2	2	89	15	+74	44	Qualification to championship play-off
3	Granitul Babadag	18	12	2	4	73	29	+44	38	Qualification to championship play-off
4	Șoimii Topolog	18	11	1	6	83	34	+49	34	Qualification to championship play-off
5	Național Somova	18	8	2	8	32	68	−36	26	
6	Sarica Niculițel	18	7	2	9	48	43	+5	23	
7	Egreta Sabangia	18	6	3	9	26	66	−40	21	
8	Ceres Min Ceamurlia de Jos	18	5	0	13	34	90	−56	15	
9	Beroe Ostrov	18	2	2	14	17	96	−79	8	
10	Dăeni	18	0	1	17	12	74	−62	1	

Rules for classification: 1) Points; 2) Head-to-head points; 3) Head-to-head goal difference; 4) Head-to-head goals scored; 5) Head-to-head away goals scored; 6) Goal difference; 7) Goals scored.

Championship play-off

Pos	Team	Pld	W	D	L	GF	GA	GD	Pts	Qualification
1	Pescărușul Sarichioi (C, Q)	6	5	0	1	30	12	+18	41	Qualification to promotion play-off
2	Flacăra Mihail Kogălniceanu	6	4	0	2	24	18	+6	34	
3	Șoimii Topolog	6	3	0	3	17	16	+1	26	
4	Granitul Babadag	6	0	0	6	9	34	−25	19	

Rules for classification: 1) Points; 2) Head-to-head points; 3) Head-to-head goal difference; 4) Head-to-head goals scored; 5) Head-to-head away goals scored; 6) Goal difference; 7) Goals scored.
(C) Champions; (Q) Qualified for the phase indicated

=== Vaslui County ===
Team changes from the previous season

- Star Tătărani (10th place and losers of the promotion/relegation play-offs), Multim Perieni (11th place and losers of the promotion/relegation play-offs), and FDR Tutova (12th place; withdrew) were relegated to Liga V Vaslui.
- FC Vulturești (Series I winners and play-off winners), Rapid Brodoc (Series I runners-up and play-off runners-up), and ACS Moara Domnească (Series II runners-up, 3rd place in the play-off, and winners of the promotion/relegation play-offs) were promoted from Liga V Vaslui.
- FC Vaslui ceded its place to CSM Vaslui.

Pos	Team	Pld	W	D	L	GF	GA	GD	Pts	Qualification
1	Vaslui	22	17	4	1	95	13	+82	55	Qualification to championship play-off
2	Hușana Huși	22	16	4	2	70	12	+58	52	Qualification to championship play-off
3	Flacara Muntenii de Sus	22	15	2	5	65	24	+41	47	Qualification to championship play-off
4	Racova Pușcași	22	15	2	5	52	37	+15	47	Qualification to championship play-off
5	Atletic Bârlad	22	11	2	9	55	50	+5	35	Qualification to championship play-off
6	Rapid Brodoc	22	10	2	10	45	50	−5	32	Qualification to championship play-off
7	Vulturești	22	10	0	12	58	46	+12	30	Qualification to championship play-off
8	Gârceni	22	9	3	10	31	42	−11	30	Qualification to championship play-off
9	Sporting Bârlad (R)	22	5	4	13	24	59	−35	19	Qualification to relegation play-out
10	Vitis Șuletea (O)	22	5	3	14	23	60	−37	18	Qualification to relegation play-out
11	Juventus Fălciu (R)	22	3	2	17	25	58	−33	11	Qualification to relegation play-out
12	Moara Domnească (R)	22	2	0	20	23	115	−92	6	Qualification to relegation play-out

Rules for classification: 1) Points; 2) Head-to-head points; 3) Head-to-head goal difference; 4) Head-to-head goals scored; 5) Head-to-head away goals scored; 6) Goal difference; 7) Goals scored.
(O) Play-off winners; (R) Relegated

Relegation play-out

Team 1	Agg.	Team 2	1st leg	2nd leg
Moara Domnească	4–6	Sporting Bârlad	2–2	2–4
Juventus Fălciu	2–4	Vitis Șuletea	0–3	2–1

Moara Domnească and Juventus Fălciu were relegated to Liga V Vaslui.

Team 1	Agg.	Team 2	1st leg	2nd leg
Vitis Șuletea	5–4	Sporting Bârlad	2–3	3–1

Sporting Bârlad relegated to Liga V Vaslui.

Championship play-off
Quarter-finals

Team 1	Agg.	Team 2	1st leg	2nd leg
Gârceni	2–6	Vaslui	1–4	1–2
Vulturești	1–13	Hușana Huși	1–5	0–8
Rapid Brodoc	4–6	Racova Pușcași	2–3	2–3
Atletic Bârlad	0–7	Flacara Muntenii de Sus	0–4	0–3

Semi-finals

Team 1	Agg.	Team 2	1st leg	2nd leg
Flacara Muntenii de Sus	3–4	Vaslui	1–2	2–2
Vulturești	4–6	Hușana Huși	4–3	0–3

Final

Team 1	Agg.	Team 2	1st leg	2nd leg
Hușana Huși	1–0	Vaslui	1–0	0–0

Hușana Huși won the Liga IV Vaslui County and qualified for the promotion play-off in Liga III.

=== Vâlcea County ===
Team changes from the previous season

- Flacăra Horezu achieved promotion to Liga III.
- CS Mădulari (9th place and promotion/relegation play-off losers), Oltețul Bălcești (11th place), and Lotru Brezoi (12th place) were relegated to Liga V Vâlcea.
- Chimia 1973 Râmnicu Vâlcea (East Series winners) and AS Râmnicu Vâlcea (East Series 3rd place and promotion/relegation play-off winners) were promoted from Liga V Vâlcea.
- Viitorul Valea Mare (West Series winners) declined promotion from Liga V Vâlcea.
- SCM Râmnicu Vâlcea withdrew.
- Voința Orlești was renamed CSC Orlești.
- AS Mihăești, DCM Râmnicu Vâlcea, and Stejarul Vlădești were admitted upon request.

Pos	Team	Pld	W	D	L	GF	GA	GD	Pts	Qualification or relegation (Note: Teams are split into two groups (play-off and play-out) after each have played 22 matches.)
1	Viitorul Dăești (C, Q)	32	30	0	2	129	26	+103	90	Qualification for promotion play-off
2	Minerul Costești	32	27	2	3	134	30	+104	83	
3	Cozia Călimănești	32	13	8	11	64	43	+21	47	
4	Unirea Tomșani	32	13	4	15	73	100	−27	43	
5	Stejarul Vlădești	32	13	2	17	71	93	−22	41	
6	Chimia 1973 Râmnicu Vâlcea	32	11	4	17	61	89	−28	37	
7	DCM Râmnicu Vâlcea	32	16	5	11	76	60	+16	53	
8	AS Râmnicu Vâlcea	32	13	2	17	82	92	−10	41	
9	Băbeni (R)	32	11	6	15	91	117	−26	39	Qualification for the relegation play-offs
10	Orlești (O)	32	9	2	21	59	103	−44	29	Qualification for the relegation play-offs
11	Oltețul Alunu (R)	32	8	3	21	61	95	−34	27	Relegation to Liga V Vâlcea
12	Mihăești (R)	32	6	6	20	60	113	−53	24	Relegation to Liga V Vâlcea

Rules for classification: 1) Points; 2) Head-to-head points; 3) Head-to-head goal difference; 4) Head-to-head goals scored; 5) Head-to-head away goals scored; 6) Goal difference; 7) Goals scored.
(C) Champions; (O) Play-off winners; (Q) Qualified for the phase indicated; (R) Relegated
Notes:

Promotion/relegation play-offs

The 9th- and 10th-placed teams of Liga IV Vâlcea face the 2nd-placed teams in the two series of Liga V Vâlcea.

Team 1	Score	Team 2
Viitorul Valea Mare	1–0	Băbeni
Păușești Otăsău	2–3	Orlești

=== Vrancea County ===
Team changes from the previous season

- Flacăra Urechești, Podgoria Cotești, Național Golești, Unirea Milcovul and Gloria Răcoasa withdrew.
- Trotușul Ruginești, Victoria Zimbrul Bordeasca, Voința Răstoaca were admitted upon request.

Group A

Pos	Team	Pld	W	D	L	GF	GA	GD	Pts	Qualification
1	Mausoleul Mărășești (Q)	10	8	0	2	37	13	+24	24	Qualification to championship play-off
2	Panciu (Q)	10	5	1	4	30	14	+16	16	Qualification to championship play-off
3	Adjud	10	4	2	4	23	28	−5	14	Possible qualification to championship play-off
4	Jariștea	10	4	1	5	16	28	−12	13	
5	Trotușul Ruginești	10	3	2	5	19	24	−5	11	
6	Homocea	10	2	2	6	17	35	−18	8	

Rules for classification: 1) Points; 2) Head-to-head points; 3) Head-to-head goal difference; 4) Head-to-head goals scored; 5) Head-to-head away goals scored; 6) Goal difference; 7) Goals scored.
(Q) Qualified for the phase indicated

Group B

Pos	Team	Pld	W	D	L	GF	GA	GD	Pts	Qualification
1	Sportul Ciorăști (Q)	8	5	0	3	43	10	+33	15	Qualification to championship play-off
2	Voința Cârligele (Q)	8	5	0	3	26	12	+14	15	Qualification to championship play-off
3	Tractorul Nănești	8	5	0	3	20	26	−6	15	Possible qualification to championship play-off
4	Victoria Zimbrul Bordeasca	8	3	0	5	12	37	−25	9	
5	Dinamo Tătăranu	8	2	0	6	11	27	−16	6	

Rules for classification: 1) Points; 2) Head-to-head points; 3) Head-to-head goal difference; 4) Head-to-head goals scored; 5) Head-to-head away goals scored; 6) Goal difference; 7) Goals scored.
(Q) Qualified for the phase indicated

Group C

Pos	Team	Pld	W	D	L	GF	GA	GD	Pts	Qualification
1	Victoria Gugești (Q)	8	8	0	0	24	6	+18	24	Qualification to championship play-off
2	Unirea Țifești (Q)	8	4	0	4	14	15	−1	12	Qualification to championship play-off
3	Voința Răstoaca	8	4	0	4	25	20	+5	12	Possible qualification to championship play-off
4	Dumbrăveni	8	2	1	5	10	18	−8	7	
5	Săgeata Biliești	8	1	1	6	12	26	−14	4	

Rules for classification: 1) Points; 2) Head-to-head points; 3) Head-to-head goal difference; 4) Head-to-head goals scored; 5) Head-to-head away goals scored; 6) Goal difference; 7) Goals scored.
(Q) Qualified for the phase indicated

Possible qualification to championship play-off

At the end of the regular season, a special table was created for the 3rd-placed teams from the three series. The best two teams in this table qualified for the championship play-off. In this ranking, only the points earned against the first and second-placed teams in their respective series were taken into account.

Pos	Team	Pld	W	D	L	GF	GA	GD	Pts	Qualification
1	Tractorul Nănești (Q)	4	2	0	2	6	16	−10	6	Qualification to championship play-off
2	Adjud (Q)	4	1	0	3	6	18	−12	3	Qualification to championship play-off
3	Voința Răstoaca	4	0	0	4	4	11	−7	0	

Rules for classification: 1) Points; 2) Head-to-head points; 3) Head-to-head goal difference; 4) Head-to-head goals scored; 5) Head-to-head away goals scored; 6) Goal difference; 7) Goals scored.
(Q) Qualified for the phase indicated

Championship play-off

The championship play-off was contested by the top eight teams from the regular season in a double round-robin format.

Pos	Team	Pld	W	D	L	GF	GA	GD	Pts	Qualification
1	Mausoleul Mărășești (C, Q)	14	11	1	2	29	10	+19	34	Qualification to promotion play-off
2	Panciu	14	9	2	3	37	16	+21	29	
3	Sportul Ciorăști	14	8	4	2	36	23	+13	28	
4	Unirea Țifești	14	8	1	5	26	24	+2	25	
5	Victoria Gugești	14	5	3	6	39	36	+3	18	
6	Voința Cârligele	14	4	2	8	27	34	−7	14	
7	Tractorul Nănești	14	4	1	9	21	35	−14	13	
8	Adjud	14	0	0	14	5	42	−37	0 (Note: Adjud withdrew after 4 rounds and lost all its remaining matches with 0–3.)	

Rules for classification: 1) Points; 2) Head-to-head points; 3) Head-to-head goal difference; 4) Head-to-head goals scored; 5) Head-to-head away goals scored; 6) Goal difference; 7) Goals scored.
(C) Champions; (Q) Qualified for the phase indicated

== See also ==
- 2018–19 Liga I
- 2018–19 Liga II
- 2018–19 Liga III
- 2018–19 Cupa României
