= Stadionul Comunal (Becicherecu Mic) =

Multi-purpose stadium in Romania

- Interactive map of Stadionul Comunal
- Address: DN6
- Location: Becicherecu Mic, Romania
- Coordinates: 45°50′04.6″N 21°02′05.4″E
- Owner: Commune of Becicherecu Mic
- Operator: Fortuna Becicherecu Mic
- Capacity: 900 (700 seated)
- Surface: Grass

Construction
- Opened: 2000s

Tenants
- Nuova Mama Mia (2002–2015); Fortuna Becicherecu Mic (2016–present); Fortuna Becicherecu Mic (W) (2016–present)

Stadionul Comunal is a multi-purpose stadium in Becicherecu Mic, Romania. It is currently used mostly for football matches and is the home ground of Fortuna Becicherecu Mic, respectively Fortuna Becicherecu Mic (women). The stadium was opened in the early 2000s, has a capacity of 900 people (700 on seats) and in the past was the home ground of another local team, Nuova Mama Mia.
