= CSM Vaslui (football) =

Romanian football club

- Full name: Clubul Sportiv Municipal Vaslui
- Nickname: Vasluienii (The Vaslui People)
- Short name: CSM, Vaslui
- Founded: 2018; 8 years ago
- Ground: Municipal
- Capacity: 9,240
- Owner: Vaslui Municipality
- Chairman: Bogdan Cristea
- Manager: Sorin Sava
- League: Liga III
- 2025–26: Liga III, Seria I, 5th
- Website: https://csmvaslui.ro/
Home colours	Away colours

Clubul Sportiv Municipal Vaslui, commonly known as CSM Vaslui, or simply as Vaslui, is a Romanian football team based in Vaslui, Vaslui County, currently playing in the Liga III. The team represents the football section of the multi-sport club CSM Vaslui, which also include basketball, athletics and handball sections.

== History ==
CSM Vaslui was established in the summer of 2018 as a multi-sport club to continue the football tradition in Vaslui after the dissolution of FC Vaslui. The football section was enrolled directly in the Liga IV – Vaslui County, the fourth tier of the Romanian football league system.

In the first season, coached by Cristian Ungureanu, the team's goal was promotion to Liga III, but the City Hall team, after finished 1st in the regular season, lost the county league final with Hușana Huși 0–1 on aggregate.

The next season, CSM Vaslui, with Remus Mustățea as head coach, missed again the promotion, as finished second at 6 points behind Sporting Juniorul Vaslui, after the season was frozen in March 2020 due to the COVID-19 pandemic in Romania.

CSM Vaslui, coached by Ionuț Chiochiu, won the 2020–21 season of Liga IV – Vaslui County, that was played, due to the high costs generated by the coronavirus pandemic, in a short tournament with just five teams, qualifying for the promotion/relegation play-off, but lost in front of Liga III side CSM Pașcani (1–2 at Pașcani and 0–5 at Vaslui).

In order to distance itself and avoid any confusion with the FC Vaslui brand, from which it took over the place in the fourth league and, in order not to have to pay its debts, the team financially supported by the Vaslui City Hall was reorganized and started again from the fifth league.

Winning the Series I and the promotion play-off of the 2021–22 Liga V – Vaslui County, "Vasluienii" returned after one season to Liga IV.

In the following season, with Gabriel Crăciun as player-coach, assisted by Adrian Racovițan and with players such as Florinel Petrariu, Ionuț Codreanu, Ciprian Petruț, Sergiu Gîrdea, Marius Bîrsan, Nicolae Olaru, Adrian Neniță, Sorin Jitaru, Valerică Joc, Robert Chirilă, Vasile Buhăescu, Robert Rusu, Sebastian Țârțârău (cpt.), Andrei Covăcel, Bogdan Cernat among others, CSM Vaslui won the Liga IV – Vaslui County and the promotion play-off against Moldova Cristești, the winner of Liga IV – Iași County (3–1 at Vaslui and 4–2 at Cristești), promoted for the first time to Liga III.

== Honours ==
Liga IV – Vaslui County

- Winners (2): 2020–21, 2022–23
- Runners-up (2): 2018–19, 2019–20

Liga V – Vaslui County

- Winners (1): 2021–22

Cupa României – Vaslui County

- Winners (4): 2018–19, 2019–20, 2020–21, 2021–22

== League history ==
Season	Tier	Division	Place	Notes	Cupa României
2025–26	3	Liga III (Seria I)	TBD		
2024–25	3	Liga III (Seria I)	5th		
2023–24	3	Liga III (Seria I)	6th		
2022–23	4	Liga IV (VS)	1st (C)	Promoted	Regional phase
2021–22	5	Liga V (VS)	1st (C)	Promoted	First round
2020–21	4	Liga IV (VS)	1st (C)		First round
2019–20	4	Liga IV (VS)	2nd		First round
2018–19	4	Liga IV (VS)	2nd		

== Players ==
=== First team squad ===
As of 10 September 2024

Note: Flags indicate national team as defined under FIFA eligibility rules; some limited exceptions apply. Players may hold more than one non-FIFA nationality.

No.	Pos.	Nation	Player
1	GK	ROU	Mihai Tătaru
2	MF	ROU	Alin Sclifos
3	FW	ROU	Eduard Ponea
4	MF	ROU	Călin Nicolau
5	FW	ROU	Albert Cuculescu
7	FW	ROU	Gabriel Cosovăț
8	MF	ROU	Octavian Cracea
9	FW	ROU	Florin Rusu
10	FW	ROU	Sebastian Țârțârău (Vice-Captain)
11	FW	ROU	Florin Burghele
12	GK	ROU	Alexandru Dohotariu
14	FW	ROU	Raul Darie
15	MF	ROU	Alexandru Hrib (on loan from Poli Iași)

No.	Pos.	Nation	Player
17	MF	ROU	Gabriel Cuzuc
18	DF	ROU	Bogdan Baciu
19	DF	ROU	Cristian Sonea
21	FW	ROU	Vasile Buhăescu (Captain)
22	MF	ROU	Vlad Mocanu
24	DF	ROU	Paul Deleanu
28	DF	ROU	Denis Ciaun
30	DF	ROU	Cosmin Tofan
44	MF	ROU	Cristian Turcu
55	MF	ROU	Rareș Scocîlcă (on loan from U Cluj)
98	GK	ROU	Rareș Hăulică
99	GK	ROU	Nicolas Căușanu

=== Out on loan ===
Note: Flags indicate national team as defined under FIFA eligibility rules; some limited exceptions apply. Players may hold more than one non-FIFA nationality.

No. / Pos. / Nation / Player	No. / Pos. / Nation / Player

== Club officials ==
=== Board of directors ===
Role	Name
Owner	(Romania) Vaslui Municipality
President	(Romania) Bogdan Cristea

=== Current technical staff ===
Role	Name
Manager	(Romania) Sorin Sava
Assistant manager	(Romania) Gabriel Crăciun	(Romania) Costinel Botez
Goalkeeping coach	(Romania) Mihai Tătaru
