= CSC Becicherecu Mic =

Romanian football club

- Full name: Clubul Sportiv Comunal; Becicherecu Mic
- Nicknames: Alb-Roșii (The White and Reds); Fortuna
- Founded: 2016; 10 years ago
- Ground: Comunal
- Capacity: 900 (700 seated)
- Owner: Becicherecu Mic Commune
- Chairman: Bogdan Sulea
- Manager: Alexandru Miron
- League: Liga V
- 2025–26: Liga V, Seria II, Timiș County, 12th
- Website: fortunabecicherec.ro
Home colours	Away colours	Third colours

Clubul Sportiv Comunal Becicherecu Mic, commonly known as CSC Becicherecu Mic, or simply as Becicherecu Mic, is a Romanian football club based in Becicherecu Mic, Timiș County. The team was founded in 2016 and is currently playing in the Liga III, third tier of the Romanian football system, after promoting at the end of the 2018–19 season.

Starting with the summer of 2020, Fortuna entered in a collaboration with ASU Politehnica Timișoara, basically becoming its unofficial satellite or second team.

== History ==
CSC Becicherecu Mic was founded in the summer of 2016 under the name of Fortuna Becicherecu Mic, in the moment when CS Nuova Mama Mia Becicherecu Mic moved from Becicherecu Mic to Timișoara, then Jimbolia. The new entity was formed and also took over the women's team of Nuova Mama Mia, including all of the players and staff, the equipment and the sports facilities under the name of ACS Fortuna Becicherecu Mic, thus insuring the continuity of the team under a new name. For this reason, the Romanian Football Federation allowed the women's team to keep its place in the second-tier league, even though a third tier was created in 2016. On the other side, the men's team had to take it all over again, starting with the lowest league in Timiș County, Liga VI. However, in these difficult conditions, the "white and reds" managed three successive promotions.

The first season of Liga III, they finished 3rd, their best performance to date. The following two seasons they finished 10th. The last season the series had only 10 teams so the 10th position meant relegation.

== Honours ==
=== Leagues ===
Liga IV – Timiș County

- Winners (1): 2018–19

Liga V – Timiș County

- Winners (1): 2017–18

Liga VI – Timiș County

- Winners (2): 2016–17, 2023–24

=== Cups ===
Cupa României – Timiș County

- Winners (1): 2017–18

== League history ==
Season	Tier	Division	Place	Notes	Cupa României
2023–24	6	Liga VI (TM)	1st (C)	Promoted	Preliminary rounds
2022–23	6	Liga VI (TM)	6th		Preliminary rounds
2021–22	4	Liga IV (TM)	17th	Relegated	First round
2020–21	3	Liga III (Seria VIII)	10th	Relegated	First round

Season	Tier	Division	Place	Notes	Cupa României
2019–20	3	Liga III (Seria IV)	10th		
2018–19	4	Liga IV (TM)	1st (C)	Promoted	First round
2017–18	5	Liga V (TM)	1st (C)	Promoted	
2016–17	6	Liga VI (TM)	1st (C)	Promoted	
