= 2017–18 CS Luceafărul Oradea season =

Luceafărul Oradea
2017–18 season
- Owner: Ioan Blidaru (1-5); Nicolae Sarcină (6-38)
- Chairman: Dumitru Ghilea (1-5); Lucia Vladimirescu (6-38)
- Manager: Cornel Țălnar (1–5); Cristian Dulca (6–25); Cristian Lupuț (23, 26–38)
- Stadium: Iuliu Bodola / Luceafărul
- Liga II: 8th
- Cupa României: Fourth Round
- Top goalscorer: League: Vlad Rusu (26); All: Vlad Rusu (26)
- Highest home attendance: 1,000 vs Dacia Unirea (23 August 2017)
- Lowest home attendance: 100 vs Olimpia (28 October 2017)
- Average home league attendance: 447
- Biggest win: 4-1 vs Balotești (21 April 2018); 4-1 vs Știința Miroslava (26 May 2018)
- Biggest defeat: 0-4 vs Hermannstadt (14 April 2018)
Home colours	Away colours	Third colours

The 2017–18 season was Luceafărul Oradea's 12th season in the Romanian football league system, and their 4th season in the Liga II. The club started the season with Ioan Blidaru as owner, Cornel Țălnar as coach and with Liga I promotion ambitions. After a very bad start and some tensions in the squad and leadership of the team Blidaru retired and the club was one step away from the dissolution. Shortly the team was bought by Nicolae Sarcină and saved from disappearance, but most of the players left the club and a squad reconstruction in the middle of the season was not easy, so Luceafărul has had oscillating evolutions.

== Players ==
=== First team squad ===
As of 9 March 2018

Note: Flags indicate national team as defined under FIFA eligibility rules; some limited exceptions apply. Players may hold more than one non-FIFA nationality.

No.	Pos.	Nation	Player
1	GK	ROU	Alin Goia
1	GK	ROU	Ionuț Poiană
2	DF	ROU	Lucian Asanache
2	MF	ROU	Marius Cioiu
2	DF	NED	Calvin Valies
3	DF	ROU	Daniel Ciobanu
5	DF	ROU	Cristian Oroş
6	DF	ROU	Andrei Tânc
7	DF	ROU	Adrian Balea
8	MF	ROU	Andrei Dragu
8	MF	ROU	Vasile Pop
9	FW	ROU	Marius Matei
9	FW	ROU	Vlad Rusu (Vice-Captain)
10	MF	ROU	Claudiu Codoban (Captain)
11	MF	ROU	Sergiu Neacșa (on loan from Hermannstadt)
12	GK	GRE	Giorgios Gakos
12	GK	ROU	Răzvan Began
12	GK	ROU	Alexandru Gudea
13	MF	ROU	Marius Feher (Vice-Captain)
14	MF	ROU	Alexandru Dulca
14	FW	ROU	Andrei Herghelegiu
15	MF	ROU	Denis Băban

No.	Pos.	Nation	Player
16	FW	ROU	Andrei Antohi
16	DF	ROU	Daniel Groza
17	MF	POR	Bruno Luz
18	MF	ROU	Florian Pârvu
18	DF	ROU	Alexandru Iacob
18	DF	ROU	Cătălin Toriște
19	DF	ROU	Andrei Cordoș
19	DF	ROU	Alin Mutu
20	MF	ROU	Alin Ţegle
21	MF	ROU	Adrian Bedea
21	DF	ROU	Răzvan Trif
22	DF	ROU	Ionuţ Ban
22	MF	ROU	Paul Păcurar
23	MF	ROU	Darius Covaci
23	FW	ROU	Andrei Ludușan
24	MF	ROU	Paul Chiş-Toie
25	DF	ROU	Alin Bărîcă (on loan from Astra)
28	MF	ROU	Darius Lukács
30	MF	ROU	Paul Chiorean
31	FW	ROU	Constantin Roșu (Vice-Captain)
33	MF	ROU	Iulian Cuc

=== Out on loan ===
Note: Flags indicate national team as defined under FIFA eligibility rules; some limited exceptions apply. Players may hold more than one non-FIFA nationality.

No. / Pos. / Nation / Player; — / DF / ROU / Flaviu Drăgan (at Crișul Chișineu-Criș)	No. / Pos. / Nation / Player

== Club Officials ==
=== Board of directors ===
Role	Name
Owner	(Romania) Nicolae Sarcină
President	(Romania) Lucia Vladimirescu
Vice-president	(Romania) Andrei Diaconescu
Executive Director	(Romania) Cristian Sabău
Sporting director	(Romania) Cristian Pirtea
Secretary	(Romania) Ana Buzatu
Press Officer	(Romania) Teodor Biriș

=== Current technical staff ===
Role	Name
Manager	(Romania) Cristian Lupuț
Assistant manager	(Romania) Viorel Domocoș
Goalkeeping coach	(Romania) Ioan Pap-Deac
Club Doctor	(Romania) Carmen Neagu-Morariu
Kinetotherapist	(Romania) Cristian Gurău

== Pre-season and friendlies ==
1 July 2017	Luceafărul Oradea (Romania)	5–0	(Romania) Mădăras	Sânmartin, Romania
18:00 UTC+3	Matei; Roșu; Groza	Report		Stadium: Luceafărul

8 July 2017	Spittal (Austria)	1–1	(Romania) Luceafărul Oradea	Mallnitz, Austria
17:00 UTC+2	Goal	Report	Codoban	Stadium: Mallnitz

10 July 2017	Lendorf (Austria)	1–8	(Romania) Luceafărul Oradea	Mallnitz, Austria
17:00 UTC+2	Goal	Report	Roșu 21', 51', 55'; Hergheligiu 65', 80'; Al.Iacob 26', 33'; Goge 72'	Stadium: Mallnitz

19 July 2017	Luceafărul Oradea (Romania)	3–1	(Romania) Unirea Livada	Sânmartin, Romania
18:00 UTC+3	Roșu 20'; Feher 55'; Codoban 65'	Report	Laslău 79'	Stadium: Luceafărul; Referee: Florin Marcu (Oradea)

22 July 2017	Luceafărul Oradea (Romania)	5–2	(Romania) Sânmartin	Sânmartin, Romania
10:00 UTC+3	Matei 9'; Codoban 17', 45+1'; Chiş-Toie 67'; Sas 90+1'	Report	Copil 12'; Meșter 84'	Stadium: Luceafărul

26 July 2017	Luceafărul Oradea (Romania)	3–0	(Romania) Unirea Livada	Sânmartin, Romania
18:00 UTC+3	Codoban 3' (pen.); Al.Iacob 22'; Matei 67'	Report		Stadium: Luceafărul

28 July 2017	Luceafărul Oradea (Romania)	0–0	(Romania) Universitatea Cluj	Sânmartin, Romania
11:30 UTC+3		Report		Stadium: Luceafărul

24 January 2018	Balmazújváros (Hungary)	0–1	(Romania) Luceafărul Oradea	Balmazújváros, Hungary
16:00 UTC+2		Report	Antohi 55'	Stadium: Városi Sportpálya II

27 January 2018	Luceafărul Oradea (Romania)	3–1	(Romania) Dacia Gepiu	Sânmartin, Romania
11:00 UTC+2	V.Rusu; Codoban	Report	Dobrescu	Stadium: Luceafărul

3 February 2018	Luceafărul Oradea (Romania)	2–1	(Romania) Dumbrăvița	Sânmartin, Romania
11:00 UTC+2	V.Pop; Codoban	Report	Goal	Stadium: Luceafărul II

9 February 2018	Luceafărul Oradea (Romania)	1–1	(Romania) Sănătatea Cluj	Sânmartin, Romania
11:00 UTC+2	Al.Dulca	Report	Goal	Stadium: Luceafărul II

13 February 2018	Universitatea Cluj (Romania)	3–3	(Romania) Luceafărul Oradea	Cluj-Napoca, Romania
13:00 UTC+2	Ursu 5'; Greu 57'; Giurgiu 59' (pen.)	Report	V.Rusu 10', 45', 52'	Stadium: Iuliu Hațieganu; Attendance: 100; Referee: Horațiu Feșnic (Cluj-Napoca)

17 February 2018	Unirea Tășnad (Romania)	3–2	(Romania) Luceafărul Oradea	Tășnad, Romania
11:00 UTC+2	Nemeș 7'; Faur 21'; Ciul 45'	Report	Neacșa 64'; Feher 90'	Stadium: Unirea; Attendance: 50

22 February 2018	Șirineasa (Romania)	1–1	(Romania) Luceafărul Oradea	Petroșani, Romania
11:00 UTC+2	Frățilescu	Report	Obekop	Stadium: Jiul II

23 February 2018	Șirineasa (Romania)	0–1	(Romania) Luceafărul Oradea	Petroșani, Romania
11:00 UTC+2		Report	Codoban	Stadium: Jiul II

3 March 2018	CFR Cluj (Romania)	9–0	(Romania) Luceafărul Oradea	Cluj-Napoca, Romania
11:00 UTC+2	Culio (pen.); Costache; Păun; Mailat (pen.); Ioniță; A.Mureşan; L.Rus; Baldé	Report		Stadium: Dr. Constantin Rădulescu; Attendance: 100; Referee: Horațiu Feșnic (Cluj-Napoca)

== Competitions ==
=== League table ===
Pos	Team	Pld	W	D	L	GF	GA	GD	Pts
6	Academica Clinceni	38	16	10	12	63	54	+9	58
7	ASU Politehnica Timișoara (Note: ASU Politehnica Timișoara were deducted 3 points because the team withdrew from the pitch in the match played on 24 April 2018 against UTA Arad. Also it lost the match by forfeit.)	38	18	6	14	55	43	+12	57
8	Luceafărul Oradea	38	15	8	15	65	59	+6	53
9	Mioveni	38	14	10	14	54	46	+8	52
10	Sportul Snagov	38	14	9	15	51	37	+14	51

Source: FRF (in Romanian)
Rules for classification: 1st points; 2nd head-to-head points; 3rd head-to-head goal difference; 4th head-to-head goals scored; 5th head-to-head away goals scored; 6th goal difference; 7th number of goals scored.

=== Result round by round ===
Round	1	2	3	4	5	6	7	8	9	10	11	12	13	14	15	16	17	18	19	20	21	22	23	24	25	26	27	28	29	30	31	32	33	34	35	36	37	38
Ground	H	H	A	H	A	H	A	H	A	H	A	H	A	H	A	H	A	H	A	A	A	H	A	H	A	H	A	H	A	H	A	H	A	H	A	H	A	H
Result	D	L	L	L	L	W	L	D	L	D	D	L	L	W	W	W	L	D	L	W	D	W	D	W	L	W	W	L	L	W	L	L	W	W	D	W	W	W
Position	9	14	14	16	18	17	18	18	19	19	19	20	20	19	18	17	18	17	16	13	14	13	11	12	13	11	10	11	12	10	11	13	12	12	13	11	9	8

Updated to match(es) played on 2 June 2018. Source: frfotbal.ro
A = Away; H = Home; W = Win; D = Draw; L = Loss

=== Results ===
5 August 2017 1	Luceafărul Oradea	1–1	Sportul Snagov	Oradea
11:00 UTC+3	Matei 36'	Report	Al.Rusu 85'	Stadium: Iuliu Bodola; Attendance: 300; Referee: Vladimir Nagy (Aiud)

12 August 2017 2	Luceafărul Oradea	1–2	Ripensia Timișoara	Oradea
11:00 UTC+3	Hergheligiu 51'	Report	Dumiter 67'; Bobină 75'	Stadium: Iuliu Bodola; Attendance: 500; Referee: Cristian Codrea (Baia Mare)

18 August 2017 3	Târgu Mureș	3–2	Luceafărul Oradea	Târgu Mureș
18:30 UTC+3	Al.Stoica 2'; Iacob 37'; Panait 73'	Report	Goge 34'; Bedea 90+4'	Stadium: Trans-Sil; Attendance: 500; Referee: Sergiu Popa (Aiud)

23 August 2017 4	Luceafărul Oradea	3–4	Dacia Unirea Brăila	Oradea
18:00 UTC+3	Hergheligiu 20', 30'; Goge 77'	Report	Ghiocel 62'; Niță 64'; G.Mihai 67'; Frunză 74'	Stadium: Iuliu Bodola; Attendance: 1,000; Referee: Mircea Ardelean (Arad)

26 August 2017 5	Argeș Pitești	3–0 (forfait)	Luceafărul Oradea	Pitești
11:00 UTC+3		Report		Stadium: Nicolae Dobrin

2 September 2017 6	Luceafărul Oradea	2–1	Chindia Târgoviște	Oradea
11:00 UTC+3	Codoban 24' (pen.); Bedea 42'	Report	L.Mihai 25'	Stadium: Iuliu Bodola; Attendance: 900; Referee: Dorin Voina (Reșița)

9 September 2017 7	Metaloglobus București	1–0	Luceafărul Oradea	Bucharest
11:00 UTC+3	Mutu 60' (o.g.)	Report		Stadium: Metaloglobus; Attendance: 150; Referee: Iuliana Demetrescu (Rm.Vâlcea)

16 September 2017 8	Luceafărul Oradea	2–1	Academica Clinceni	Oradea
11:00 UTC+3	Antohi 55'	Report	Deaconescu 69'	Stadium: Iuliu Bodola; Attendance: 650; Referee: Vladimir Nagy (Aiud)

23 September 2017 9	Mioveni	3–2	Luceafărul Oradea	Mioveni
11:00 UTC+3	Rădescu 35', 75', 90'	Report	V.Rusu 27', 50'	Stadium: Orășenesc; Attendance: 1,000; Referee: Ionuț Iugulescu (Târgoviște)

30 September 2017 10	Luceafărul Oradea	0–0	Hermannstadt	Oradea
11:00 UTC+3		Report		Stadium: Iuliu Bodola; Attendance: 500; Referee: Nicolae Botaș (Timișoara)

7 October 2017 11	Balotești	2–2	Luceafărul Oradea	Balotești
11:00 UTC+3	Hurdubei 5'; Neagu 46'	Report	Codoban 69'; V.Rusu 82'	Stadium: Central; Attendance: 50; Referee: Cristian Georgescu (Bucharest)

14 October 2017 12	Luceafărul Oradea	1–2	Afumați	Sânmartin
11:00 UTC+3	Codoban 14'	Report	Zaharia 28'; Tudorache 81'	Stadium: Luceafărul; Attendance: 350; Referee: Florin Mazilu (Satu Mare)

21 October 2017 13	Dunărea Călărași	1–0	Luceafărul Oradea	Călărași
11:00 UTC+3	Kanda 90'	Report		Stadium: Ion Comșa; Attendance: 1,500; Referee: Cristian Dumitrică (Craiova)

28 October 2017 14	Luceafărul Oradea	2–1	Olimpia Satu Mare	Sânmartin
11:00 UTC+3	Antohi 48'; V.Rusu 62'	Report	V.Pop 34'	Stadium: Luceafărul; Attendance: 100; Referee: Cristian Codrea (Baia Mare)

4 November 2017 15	UTA Arad	2–3	Luceafărul Oradea	Șiria
11:00 UTC+2	Hlistei 65' (pen.); Curtuiuș 75'	Report	V.Rusu 45', 62'; Codoban 59'	Stadium: Otto Greffner; Attendance: 300; Referee: Cătălin Buși (Rm.Vâlcea)

8 November 2017 16	Luceafărul Oradea	3–1	Pandurii Târgu Jiu	Sânmartin
14:00 UTC+2	B.Luz 4'; Antohi 31'; V.Rusu 71'	Report	Dodoi 28'	Stadium: Luceafărul; Attendance: 300; Referee: Ovidiu Oprea (Ploiești)

12 November 2017 17	ASU Politehnica Timișoara	2–0	Luceafărul Oradea	Timișoara
14:00 UTC+2	Sorescu 10'; I.Plămadă 84'	Report		Stadium: Știința; Attendance: 500; Referee: Robert Avram (Pitești)

18 November 2017 18	Luceafărul Oradea	1–1	Știința Miroslava	Sânmartin
11:00 UTC+2	V.Rusu 31'	Report	Corban 71'	Stadium: Luceafărul; Attendance: 150; Referee: Marius Chioran (Cluj-Napoca)

25 November 2017 19	Foresta Suceava	3–0	Luceafărul Oradea	Suceava
11:00 UTC+2	Matei 4', 47'; Bosînceanu 51'	Report		Stadium: Areni; Attendance: 500; Referee: Bogdan Anghelinei (Galați)

2 December 2017 20	Sportul Snagov	0–3	Luceafărul Oradea	Ghermănești
11:00 UTC+2		Report	Tânc 32'; V.Rusu 37'; Codoban 79'	Stadium: Voința; Attendance: 50; Referee: Ionuț Iugulescu (Târgoviște)

9 December 2017 21	Ripensia Timișoara	4–4	Luceafărul Oradea	Timișoara
11:00 UTC+2	Ndiaye 3', 30', 48'; Neamțu 90+3'	Report	V.Rusu 1', 25', 70' (pen.); Trif 81'	Stadium: Ciarda Roșie; Attendance: 100; Referee: Paul Unimatan (Zalău)

24 February 2018 22	Luceafărul Oradea	3–0 (forfait)	Târgu Mureș	Sânmartin
11:00 UTC+2		Report		Stadium: Luceafărul

28 March 2018 23	Dacia Unirea Brăila	1–1	Luceafărul Oradea	Brăila
15:00 UTC+2	Anghelina 44'	Report	Oroș 61'	Stadium: Municipal; Attendance: 200; Referee: Ovidiu Oprea (Ploiești)

10 March 2018 24	Luceafărul Oradea	3–2	Argeș Pitești	Sânmartin
11:00 UTC+2	V.Rusu 37', 87'; Al.Dulca 90'	Report	Buhăescu 3'; Oroș 28' (o.g.)	Stadium: Luceafărul; Attendance: 400; Referee: Sergiu Popa (Aiud)

18 March 2018 25	Chindia Târgoviște	2–1	Luceafărul Oradea	Târgoviște
13:00 UTC+2	L.Mihai 75'; Neguț 84'	Report	V.Rusu 48' (pen.)	Stadium: Eugen Popescu; Attendance: 300; Referee: Dan Dreve (Cluj-Napoca)

24 March 2018 26	Luceafărul Oradea	2–0	Metaloglobus București	Sânmartin
11:00 UTC+2	Tânc 70'; V.Rusu 84'	Report		Stadium: Luceafărul; Attendance: 200; Referee: Vladimir Nagy (Aiud)

31 March 2018 27	Academica Clinceni	1–2	Luceafărul Oradea	Clinceni
11:00 UTC+3	Al.Popescu 90+2'	Report	Tânc 43'; Neacșa 61'	Stadium: Clinceni; Attendance: 100; Referee: Mihai Amorăriței (Câmpina)

6 April 2018 28	Luceafărul Oradea	0–1	Mioveni	Sânmartin
11:00 UTC+3		Report	Burnea 45'	Stadium: Luceafărul; Attendance: 300; Referee: Viorel Flueran (Craiova)

14 April 2018 29	Hermannstadt	4–0	Luceafărul Oradea	Sibiu
11:00 UTC+3	Petrescu 19'; Crișan 25'; Blănaru 80', 88'	Report		Stadium: Municipal; Attendance: 2,500; Referee: Mircea Ardelean (Arad)

21 April 2018 30	Luceafărul Oradea	4–1	Balotești	Sânmartin
11:00 UTC+3	V.Rusu 22', 67'; Al.Dulca 31'; Țegle 51'	Report	C.Mihai 62'	Stadium: Luceafărul; Attendance: 350; Referee: Cristian Codrea (Baia Mare)

25 April 2018 31	Afumați	2–1	Luceafărul Oradea	Afumați
11:00 UTC+3	Patriche 48'; Zaharia 75'	Report	Olariu 87' (o.g.)	Stadium: Comunal; Attendance: 100; Referee: Florin Dan (Chirnogi)

29 April 2018 32	Luceafărul Oradea	1–2	Dunărea Călărași	Sânmartin
11:00 UTC+3	V.Rusu 58' (pen.)	Report	V.Alexandru 4' (pen.); Kanda 78'	Stadium: Luceafărul; Attendance: 600; Referee: Robert Avram (Pitești)

5 May 2018 33	Olimpia Satu Mare	0–3 (forfait)	Luceafărul Oradea	Satu Mare
11:00 UTC+3		Report		Stadium: Daniel Prodan

12 May 2018 34	Luceafărul Oradea	3–2	UTA Arad	Sânmartin
11:00 UTC+3	Țegle 3'; V.Rusu 63' (pen.), 83' (pen.)	Report	Feher 40' (o.g.); D.Popa 65'	Stadium: Luceafărul; Attendance: 400; Referee: Florin Andrei (Târgu Mureș)

16 May 2018 35	Pandurii Târgu Jiu	1–1	Luceafărul Oradea	Motru
18:00 UTC+3	Tudoran 88'	Report	V.Rusu 54' (pen.)	Stadium: Minerul; Attendance: 250; Referee: Nicolae Botaș (Timișoara)

20 May 2018 36	Luceafărul Oradea	2–1	ASU Politehnica Timișoara	Sânmartin
11:00 UTC+3	Feher 69'; V.Rusu 73'	Report	Sorescu 4'	Stadium: Luceafărul; Attendance: 600; Referee: Florin Mazilu (Satu Mare)

26 May 2018 37	Știința Miroslava	1–4	Luceafărul Oradea	Uricani
11:00 UTC+3	Căruță 60'	Report	V.Rusu 5', 26' (pen.), 72'; B.Luz 57'	Stadium: Comunal; Attendance: 200; Referee: Robert Dumitru (Sfântu Gheorghe)

1 June 2018 38	Luceafărul Oradea	3–0 (forfait)	Foresta Suceava	Sânmartin
11:00 UTC+3		Report		Stadium: Luceafărul

=== Cupa României ===
3 October 2017 Fourth Round	Sănătatea Cluj	3–1	Luceafărul Oradea	Cluj-Napoca
14:30 UTC+3	Ceaca 10'; Lupu 32'; Vitan 72'	Report	Trif 17'	Stadium: Clujana; Attendance: 100; Referee: Szabolcs Kovács (Carei)

== See also ==
- 2017–18 Cupa României
- Liga II
