= 2018–19 CS Luceafărul Oradea season =

Luceafărul Oradea
2018–19 season
- Owner: Nicolae Sarcină
- Chairman: Lucia Vladimirescu
- Manager: Cristian Lupuț
- Stadium: Luceafărul
- Liga II: 8th
- Cupa României: Round of 32
- Top goalscorer: League: Vasile Pop (15); All: Vasile Pop (16)
- Highest home attendance: 1,200 vs Astra (27 September 2018)
- Lowest home attendance: 50 vs Clinceni (22 September 2018)
- Average home league attendance: 285
- Biggest win: 6–0 vs Brăila (1 June 2019)
- Biggest defeat: 0–5 vs Farul (17 November 2018); 0–5 vs Clinceni (30 March 2019)
Home colours	Away colours	Third colours

The 2018–19 is Luceafărul Oradea's 13th season in the Romanian football league system, and their 5th season in the Liga II. Luceferii started the season with an almost entire new squad formed by only 11 players from the old one and a lot of young players. Cristian Lupuț was confirmed as the manager of the team for this season.

== Previous season positions ==
	Competition	Position
(Romania)	Liga II	8th
(Romania)	Cupa României	Fourth Round

== First-team squad ==
Last updated on 10 March 2019

Squad No.	Name	Nationality	Position(s)	Date of birth (age)
Goalkeepers
1	Ionuț Rus	(Romania)	GK	20 January 2000 (age 26)
12	Sebastian Moroz	(Romania)	GK	4 April 1998 (age 28)
95	Bogdan Moga	(Romania)	GK	14 May 1995 (age 31)
Defenders
2	Vlad Opriș	(Romania)	CB	9 September 1996 (age 30)
3	Alexandru Core	(Romania)	CB	12 December 2000 (age 25)
4	Alan Wanya	(Belgium)	RB / RM	6 May 1998 (age 28)
5	Cristian Oroș (captain)	(Romania)	CB	15 August 1984 (age 42)
14	Adrian Ciul	(Romania)	RB	28 January 1996 (age 30)
15	François Yabré	(Burkina Faso)	CB	10 May 1991 (age 35)
21	Kevin Moihedja	(France)	LB	19 February 1996 (age 30)
22	Flaviu Drăgan	(Romania)	RB	20 April 1997 (age 29)
23	Alexandru Băican	(Romania)	LB / CB	15 September 1998 (age 28)
Midfielders
6	Gabriel Preoteasa	(Romania)	CM	22 July 1996 (age 30)
7	Paul Mitrică	(Romania)	RM	22 August 1999 (age 27)
8	Alexandru Dulca	(Romania)	CM / AM / LM	30 July 1997 (age 29)
10	Paul Chiorean	(Romania)	CM	1 January 1997 (age 29)
16	Vasile Pop	(Romania)	LM / CF	4 November 1989 (age 37)
17	Patrick Peter	(Romania)	AM	26 June 2000 (age 26)
18	Lü Yuefeng	(China)	CM	13 November 1995 (age 30)
20	Vlad Prejmerean	(Romania)	CM	25 March 1998 (age 28)
24	Pavel Nemeș	(Romania)	CM	20 August 1997 (age 29)
25	Tudor Călin	(Romania)	CM	8 October 2000 (age 26)
Forwards
9	Daniel Paraschiv	(Romania)	CF / ST	24 April 1999 (age 27)
11	Constantin Roșu (vice-captain)	(Romania)	LW / CF	26 May 1990 (age 36)
13	Andrei Ludușan	(Romania)	CF / ST	15 May 1996 (age 30)
19	Bertrand Bebey	(Cameroon)	CF / ST	6 January 1991 (age 35)
26	Daniel Lăsconi	(Romania)	CF / ST	1 June 1995 (age 31)

== Transfers and loans ==
=== Transfers in ===
Entry date	Position	No.	Player	From club	Fee
30 June 2018	RB	22	(Romania) Flaviu Drăgan	(Romania) Crișul Chișineu-Criș	Loan return
1 July 2018	GK	12	(Romania) Ovidiu Jianu	(Romania) Pandurii Târgu Jiu	Free transfer
1 July 2018	GK	95	(Romania) Bogdan Moga	(Romania) Pandurii Târgu Jiu	Free transfer
1 July 2018	LB / CB	23	(Romania) Alexandru Băican	(Romania) CFR II Cluj	Free transfer
1 July 2018	CB		(Romania) Alexandru Core	(Romania) Atletic Târgu Mureș	Free transfer
1 July 2018	CB	2	(Romania) Ionuț Gruia	(Romania) Energeticianul	Loan
1 July 2018	CM		(Romania) Narcis Cîrlig	(Romania) Energeticianul	Loan
1 July 2018	RM	17	(Romania) Paul Mitrică	(Romania) AFC Hărman	Free transfer
1 July 2018	CM	20	(Romania) Vlad Prejmerean	(Romania) AFC Hărman	Free transfer
1 July 2018	RW / RB	18	(Romania) Răzvan Gunie	(Romania) Energeticianul	Loan
1 July 2018	CF / ST	19	(Romania) Daniel Paraschiv	(Romania) AFC Hărman	Free transfer
1 July 2018	CF / ST	15	(Romania) Sergiu Pop	(Romania) Crișul Aleșd	Free transfer
1 August 2018	GK	1	(Romania) Sebastian Moroz	(Romania) Unirea Tășnad	Free transfer
1 August 2018	CM	14	(Romania) Gabriel Preoteasa	(Romania) Dunărea Călărași	Free transfer
3 August 2018	CB	4	(Romania) Vlad Opriș	(Romania) Foresta Suceava	Free transfer
28 August 2018	CM	25	(Romania) Hery Kim	(Italy) Sassuolo	Free transfer
28 August 2018	AM	24	(Romania) Patrick Peter	(Romania) CNP Timișoara	Free transfer
28 August 2018	CF / ST	26	(Romania) Daniel Lăsconi	(Romania) Energeticianul	Loan
10 September 2018	CF / ST	9	(Romania) Cătălin Țîră	(Romania) Viitorul Constanța	Free transfer
20 September 2018	LB	21	(France) Kevin Moihedja	(France) La Flèche	Free transfer
10 January 2019	RB		(Romania) Adrian Ciul	(Romania) Unirea Tășnad	Free transfer
10 January 2019	CM		(Romania) Pavel Nemeș	(Romania) Unirea Tășnad	Free transfer
21 January 2019	RB / RM		(Belgium) Alan Wanya	Free agent	Free transfer
31 January 2019	CM		(China) Lü Yuefeng	(Romania) Dacia Unirea Brăila	Free transfer
13 February 2019	GK		(Romania) Ionuț Rus	(Romania) CFR Cluj	Loan
13 February 2019	CM		(Romania) Tudor Călin	(Romania) Sepsi Sfântu Gheorghe	Loan
14 February 2019	CB		(Burkina Faso) François Yabré	(Norway) Mjølner	Free transfer
19 February 2019	CF / ST		(Cameroon) Bertrand Bebey	(Romania) Dacia Unirea Brăila	Free transfer
Total					€0

=== Transfers out ===
Exit date	Position	No.	Player	To club	Fee
30 June 2018	CB	26	(Romania) Alin Bărîcă	(Romania) Astra Giurgiu	Loan return
30 June 2018	LB	21	(Romania) Răzvan Trif	(Romania) Gaz Metan Mediaș	Loan return
30 June 2018	AM	11	(Romania) Alexandru Neacșa	(Romania) Hermannstadt	Loan return
1 July 2018	RB	7	(Romania) Adrian Balea	(Germany) SF Bundenthal	Free transfer
1 July 2018	CB	4	(Romania) Daniel Ciobanu	(Romania) Pandurii Târgu Jiu	Free transfer
1 July 2018	RB	2	(Netherlands) Calvin Valies	(Sweden) Syrianska	Free transfer
1 July 2018	CM	25	(Romania) Denis Băban	Free agent	Released
1 July 2018	CM	13	(Romania) Marius Feher	Free agent	Released
1 July 2018	LW	17	(Portugal) Bruno Luz	(Poland) Radomiak Radom	Free transfer
1 July 2018	CM	20	(Romania) Alin Țegle	(Romania) Universitatea Craiova	Free transfer
1 July 2018	CF / ST	9	(Romania) Vlad Rusu	(Romania) Energeticianul	Free transfer
9 July 2018	CB	19	(Romania) Alin Mutu	(Romania) ACS Poli Timișoara	Free transfer
17 July 2018	CF / SS	16	(Romania) Andrei Antohi	(Romania) Oțelul Galați	Free transfer
8 August 2018	GK	12	(Romania) Alexandru Gudea	(Romania) Minaur Baia Mare	Free transfer
1 September 2018	GK	1	(Romania) Alin Goia	Free agent	Released
1 September 2018	CM	24	(Romania) Paul Chiș-Toie	(Romania) Minaur Baia Mare	Free transfer
26 September 2018	CM	18	(Romania) Darius Lukács	Free agent	Released
6 November 2018	RB	18	(Romania) Cătălin Toriște	Free agent	Released
20 November 2018	AM	10	(Romania) Claudiu Codoban	(Romania) FC U Craiova	Free transfer
31 December 2018	CB	2	(Romania) Ionuț Gruia	(Romania) Energeticianul	Loan return
31 December 2018	CM		(Romania) Narcis Cîrlig	(Romania) Energeticianul	Loan return
31 December 2018	RW / RB	18	(Romania) Răzvan Gunie	(Romania) Energeticianul	Loan return
3 January 2019	CF / ST	9	(Romania) Cătălin Țîră	(Greece) Episkopi	Free transfer
10 January 2019	LB / LM	7	(Romania) Ionuț Ban	(Romania) Sânmartin	Free transfer
10 January 2019	CB	6	(Romania) Andrei Tânc	(Romania) Ripensia Timișoara	Free transfer
18 January 2019	CF / ST	15	(Romania) Sergiu Pop	(Romania) Sânmartin	Free transfer
7 February 2019	CM	25	(Romania) Hery Kim	(Romania) Pandurii Târgu Jiu	Free transfer
Total					€0

=== Loans out ===
Start date	End date	Position	No.	Player	To club	Fee
1 September 2018	30 June 2019	GK	12	(Romania) Ovidiu Jianu	(Romania) Șoimii Lipova	None

== Pre-season and friendlies ==
Win Draw Loss

7 July 2018 Friendly	Universitatea Cluj (Romania)	2–0	(Romania) Luceafărul Oradea	Cluj-Napoca, Romania
12:00 UTC+3	M.Coman 52'; Dumitrescu 87'	Report		Stadium: Iuliu Hațieganu; Attendance: 70

18 July 2018 Friendly	Füzesgyarmat (Hungary)	1–0	(Romania) Luceafărul Oradea	Füzesgyarmat, Hungary
18:00 UTC+3	D.Székely 70'	Report		Stadium: Lázár Gyula

21 July 2018 Friendly	Luceafărul Oradea (Romania)	3–2	(Romania) Ripensia Timișoara	Sânmartin, Romania
12:00 UTC+3	Ludușan 39'; V.Pop 45' (pen.); Codoban 56' (pen.)	Report	C.Toma 32'; Bădăuță 73'	Stadium: Luceafărul

25 July 2018 Friendly	Luceafărul Oradea (Romania)	5–0	(Romania) ASU Politehnica Timișoara	Sânmartin, Romania
18:15 UTC+3	V.Pop 39' (pen.), 58', 78', 80'; Prejmerean 53'	Report		Stadium: Luceafărul; Attendance: 50; Referee: Florin Marcu (Sânmartin)

28 July 2018 Friendly	Luceafărul Oradea (Romania)	1–1	(Romania) Unirea Tășnad	Sânmartin, Romania
11:00 UTC+3	Ludușan 16'	Report	C.Ene 70'	Stadium: Luceafărul

26 January 2019 Friendly	Debrecen (Hungary)	4–0	(Romania) Luceafărul Oradea	Debrecen, Hungary
13:00 EET (UTC+2)	Damásdi 5'; Szatmári 11'; Tabaković 61'; Takács 79'	Report		Stadium: Nagyerdei 2

6 February 2019 Friendly	Luceafărul Oradea (Romania)	3–1	(Romania) Cetate Deva	Sânmartin, Romania
13:00 EET (UTC+2)	V.Pop 15'; Ludușan 75'; Paraschiv 83'	Report	Muscă 65'	Stadium: Luceafărul 2 Referee: Andrei Pirtea (Oradea)

9 February 2019 Friendly	UTA Arad (Romania)	1–1	(Romania) Luceafărul Oradea	Arad, Romania
13:00 EET (UTC+2)	D.Popa 86'	Report	F.Drăgan 89'	Stadium: Motorul; Attendance: 100; Referee: Mircea Ardelean (Arad)

13 February 2019 Friendly	Luceafărul Oradea (Romania)	4–1	(Romania) Șoimii Lipova	Sânmartin, Romania
13:00 EET (UTC+2)	Oroș 70'; Prejmerean 76'; Ludușan 82'; V.Pop 90'	Report	Ciul 42' (o.g.)	Stadium: Luceafărul 2 Referee: Adrian Pal (Oradea)

16 February 2019 Friendly	Luceafărul Oradea (Romania)	3–0	(Romania) CA Oradea	Sânmartin, Romania
11:00 EET (UTC+2)	Al.Dulca 16'; Ludușan 22'; Mitrică 89' (pen.)	Report		Stadium: Luceafărul; Attendance: 50; Referee: Andrei Pirtea (Oradea)

== Competitions ==
Win Draw Loss

=== Overview ===
Competition	First match	Last match	Starting round	Final position	Record							
Competition	First match	Last match	Starting round	Final position	Pld	W	D	L	GF	GA	GD	Win %
Liga II	4 August 2018	1 June 2019	Matchday 1	8	38	14	10	14	57	59	−2	36.84
Cupa României	11 September 2018	27 September 2018	Fourth Round	Round of 32	2	1	0	1	5	6	−1	50.00
Total					40	15	10	15	62	65	−3	37.50

Last updated: 1 June 2019
Source: Competitions

=== Liga II ===
The Liga II fixture list was announced on 19 July 2018.

==== League table ====
Pos	Team	Pld	W	D	L	GF	GA	GD	Pts	Promotion or relegation
6	Argeș Pitești	38	20	8	10	54	33	+21	68	
7	Mioveni	38	18	7	13	63	41	+22	61	
8	Luceafărul Oradea (Note: Luceafărul Oradea withdrew from Liga II after the end of the season and was enrolled instead in the Liga III, a move made due to financial reasons.) (R)	38	14	10	14	57	59	−2	52	Relegation to Liga III
9	Metaloglobus București	38	14	7	17	43	56	−13	49	
10	ASU Politehnica Timișoara	38	13	9	16	39	38	+1	48	

Source: FRF (in Romanian), Soccerway
Rules for classification: 1) Points; 2) Head-to-head points; 3) Head-to-head goal difference; 4) Head-to-head goals scored; 5) Head-to-head away goals scored; 6) Goal difference; 7) Goals scored.
(R) Relegated

==== Results summary ====
Overall								Home						Away					
Pld	W	D	L	GF	GA	GD	Pts	W	D	L	GF	GA	GD	W	D	L	GF	GA	GD
38	14	10	14	57	59	−2	52	11	5	3	41	16	+25	3	5	11	16	43	−27

Last updated: 1 June 2019.

==== Position by round ====
Round	1	2	3	4	5	6	7	8	9	10	11	12	13	14	15	16	17	18	19	20	21	22	23	24	25	26	27	28	29	30	31	32	33	34	35	36	37	38
Ground	A	H	A	H	A	H	A	H	A	H	A	H	A	H	A	H	A	H	A	H	A	H	A	H	A	H	A	H	A	H	A	H	A	H	A	H	A	H
Result	L	D	D	W	L	L	L	W	L	D	L	W	L	W	L	W	L	D	D	W	L	D	D	L	W	W	L	L	W	W	D	D	D	W	W	W	L	W
Position	20	18	16	11	13	15	16	14	17	15	16	15	16	14	15	14	15	15	14	13	14	14	13	16	14	13	13	15	11	10	11	12	12	11	9	8	8	8

Updated to match(es) played on 1 June 2019. Source: frfotbal.ro
A = Away; H = Home; W = Win; D = Draw; L = Loss

==== Matches ====
Win Draw Loss

4 August 2018 1	Energeticianul	4–0	Luceafărul Oradea	Petroșani
11:00 EEST (UTC+3)	Neagu 27'; V.Rusu 30', 89', 90+1'	Report		Stadium: Jiul; Attendance: 400; Referee: Mircea Ardelean (Arad)

11 August 2018 2	Luceafărul Oradea	2–2	Ripensia Timișoara	Sânmartin
11:00 EEST (UTC+3)	V.Pop 35', 62' (pen.)	Report	Dumiter 11'; Monea 31'	Stadium: Luceafărul; Attendance: 100; Referee: Cristian Codrea (Baia Mare)

19 August 2018 3	ASU Politehnica Timișoara	0–0	Luceafărul Oradea	Timișoara
18:00 EEST (UTC+3)		Report		Stadium: Dan Păltinișanu; Attendance: 1,000; Referee: Ionela Pleșu (Craiova)

25 August 2018 4	Luceafărul Oradea	4–2	ACS Poli Timișoara	Sânmartin
11:00 EEST (UTC+3)	Codoban 11'; Ludușan 67'; Al.Dulca 77'; Mitrică 81'	Report	Codrea 48'; Drăghici 64' (pen.)	Stadium: Luceafărul; Attendance: 250; Referee: Marius Chioran (Cluj-Napoca)

3 September 2018 5	Universitatea Cluj	2–0	Luceafărul Oradea	Cluj-Napoca
18:00 EEST (UTC+3)	Hordouan 8'; Gavra 42'	Report		Stadium: Cluj Arena; Attendance: 3,034; Referee: Viorel Flueran (Craiova)

8 September 2018 6	Luceafărul Oradea	0–1	UTA Arad	Sânmartin
11:00 EEST (UTC+3)		Report	Cr.Matei 76'	Stadium: Luceafărul; Attendance: 300; Referee: Florin Mazilu (Satu Mare)

16 September 2018 7	Aerostar Bacău	3–1	Luceafărul Oradea	Bacău
11:00 EEST (UTC+3)	Hurdubei 11'; Buhăcianu 23'; Vraciu 36'	Report	Mitrică 45'	Stadium: Aerostar; Attendance: 300; Referee: Bogdan Anghelinei (Galați)

22 September 2018 8	Luceafărul Oradea	1–0	Academica Clinceni	Sânmartin
12:30 EEST (UTC+3)	Ludușan 85'	Report		Stadium: Luceafărul; Attendance: 50; Referee: Denis Haidiner (Hunedoara)

30 September 2018 9	Argeș Pitești	3–0	Luceafărul Oradea	Pitești
11:00 EEST (UTC+3)	Costin 28'; Vișa 69'; Buhăescu 74'	Report		Stadium: Nicolae Dobrin; Attendance: 300; Referee: Dan Dreve (Cluj-Napoca)

6 October 2018 10	Luceafărul Oradea	1–1	Sportul Snagov	Sânmartin
11:00 EEST (UTC+3)	V.Pop 29'	Report	Dănălache 77'	Stadium: Luceafărul; Attendance: 100; Referee: Omar Dumitrică (Craiova)

9 October 2018 11	Petrolul Ploiești	6–2	Luceafărul Oradea	Ploiești
19:30 EEST (UTC+3)	Chindriș 2'; Lumu 8'; Țigănașu 27', 54'; Oroș 63' (o.g.); Ștefănescu 75'	Report	Paraschiv 14', 34'	Stadium: Ilie Oană; Attendance: 3,000; Referee: Viorel Flueran (Craiova)

13 October 2018 12	Luceafărul Oradea	4–1	Balotești	Sânmartin
11:00 EEST (UTC+3)	Paraschiv 41', 52'; Codoban 69'; Al.Dulca 71'	Report	Al.Stoica 36'	Stadium: Luceafărul; Attendance: 80; Referee: Marius Chioran (Cluj-Napoca)

20 October 2018 13	Mioveni	2–1	Luceafărul Oradea	Mioveni
11:00 EEST (UTC+3)	Gunie 81' (o.g.); Burnea 85'	Report	Țîră 26'	Stadium: Orășenesc; Attendance: 500; Referee: Bogdan Anghelinei (Galați)

27 October 2018 14	Luceafărul Oradea	1–0	Pandurii Târgu Jiu	Sânmartin
14:00 EEST (UTC+3)	Codoban 80' (pen.)	Report		Stadium: Luceafărul; Attendance: 150; Referee: Cristian Codrea (Baia Mare)

3 November 2018 15	Daco-Getica București	3–1	Luceafărul Oradea	Bucharest
11:00 EET (UTC+2)	Nica 34'; A.Voicu 40'; Teuț 64'	Report	Codoban 71' (pen.)	Stadium: Colentina; Attendance: 400; Referee: Ovidiu Oprea (Ploiești)

10 November 2018 16	Luceafărul Oradea	3–0	Metaloglobus București	Sânmartin
11:00 EET (UTC+2)	D.Paraschiv 65'; Al.Dulca 74'; Opriș 89'	Report		Stadium: Luceafărul; Attendance: 70; Referee: Dan Dreve (Cluj-Napoca)

17 November 2018 17	Farul Constanța	5–0	Luceafărul Oradea	Constanța
11:00 EET (UTC+2)	Păun 14'; Twumasi 35', 45'; Fotescu 41'; Jallow 53'	Report		Stadium: Farul; Attendance: 200; Referee: Constantin Olaru (Rm. Vâlcea)

24 November 2018 18	Luceafărul Oradea	0–0	Chindia Târgoviște	Sânmartin
12:00 EET (UTC+2)		Report		Stadium: Luceafărul; Attendance: 100; Referee: Florin Mazilu (Satu Mare)

28 November 2018 19	Dacia Unirea Brăila	1–1	Luceafărul Oradea	Brăila
14:00 EET (UTC+2)	Yuefeng 90+2'	Report	Al.Dulca 72'	Stadium: Municipal; Attendance: 100; Referee: Claudiu Marcu (Constanța)

2 December 2018 20	Luceafărul Oradea	2–1	Energeticianul	Sânmartin
11:00 EET (UTC+2)	Ludușan 71'; V.Pop 79'	Report	M.Ioniță 90+2'	Stadium: Luceafărul; Attendance: 100; Referee: Andrei Țiții (Șura Mică)

8 December 2018 21	Ripensia Timișoara	2–0	Luceafărul Oradea	Timișoara
11:00 EET (UTC+2)	Bădăuță 25'; Hecsko 77'	Report		Stadium: Ciarda Roșie; Attendance: 60; Referee: Dorin Voina (Reșița)

23 February 2019 22	Luceafărul Oradea	0–0	ASU Politehnica Timișoara	Sânmartin
11:00 EET (UTC+2)		Report		Stadium: Luceafărul; Attendance: 250; Referee: Vladimir Nagy (Aiud)

2 March 2019 23	ACS Poli Timișoara	1–1	Luceafărul Oradea	Timișoara
11:00 EET (UTC+2)	Bădăuță 80'	Report	V.Pop 23'	Stadium: Electrica; Attendance: 300; Referee: Marius Chioran (Cluj-Napoca)

10 March 2019 24	Luceafărul Oradea	1–3	Universitatea Cluj	Sânmartin
13:00 EET (UTC+2)	V.Pop 10'	Report	D.Pîrvulescu 15', 68'; Gavra 84'	Stadium: Luceafărul; Attendance: 1,000; Referee: Sergiu Popa (Aiud)

16 March 2019 25	UTA Arad	0–3	Luceafărul Oradea	Arad
11:00 EET (UTC+2)		Report	V.Pop 22', 39' (pen.); Paraschiv 90+3'	Stadium: Motorul; Attendance: 500; Referee: Cristian Codrea (Baia Mare)

23 March 2019 26	Luceafărul Oradea	4–0	Aerostar Bacău	Sânmartin
11:00 EET (UTC+2)	Bebey 3'; V.Pop 6'; Al.Dulca 69', 90'	Report		Stadium: Luceafărul; Attendance: 100; Referee: Florin Mazilu (Satu Mare)

30 March 2019 27	Academica Clinceni	5–0	Luceafărul Oradea	Clinceni
11:00 EET (UTC+2)	Răuță 23'; R.Ion 42'; Pațurcă 70'; Buziuc 72', 90+2'	Report		Stadium: Clinceni; Attendance: 400; Referee: Eduard Ioniță (Galați)

6 April 2019 28	Luceafărul Oradea	1–2	Argeș Pitești	Sânmartin
11:00 EEST (UTC+3)	Yabré 69'	Report	Barbu 62'; Buhăescu 81'	Stadium: Luceafărul; Attendance: 100; Referee: Dorin Voina (Reșița)

10 April 2019 29	Sportul Snagov	2–4	Luceafărul Oradea	Ghermănești
17:00 EEST (UTC+3)	L.Ion 72'; Al.Ioniță 86'	Report	V.Pop 43' (pen.), 45'; Preoteasa 56'; Ludușan 89'	Stadium: Voința; Attendance: 300; Referee: Florin Dan (Chirnogi)

14 April 2019 30	Luceafărul Oradea	3–1	Petrolul Ploiești	Sânmartin
14:00 EEST (UTC+3)	V.Pop 25'; Paraschiv 29'; Preoteasa 78' (pen.)	Report		Stadium: Luceafărul; Attendance: 800; Referee: Iulian Călin (Ștefănești)

20 April 2019 31	Balotești	0–0	Luceafărul Oradea	Balotești
11:00 EEST (UTC+3)		Report		Stadium: Central; Attendance: 200; Referee: Dan Dreve (Cluj-Napoca)

26 April 2019 32	Luceafărul Oradea	2–2	Mioveni	Sânmartin
11:00 EEST (UTC+3)	Paraschiv 30'; V.Pop 57'	Report	Hergheligiu 8', 42' (pen.)	Stadium: Luceafărul; Attendance: 250; Referee: Mircea Ardelean (Arad)

4 May 2019 33	Pandurii Târgu Jiu	0–0	Luceafărul Oradea	Târgu Jiu
11:00 EEST (UTC+3)		Report		Stadium: Tudor Vladimirescu; Attendance: 500; Referee: Adrian Illyeș (Ploiești)

11 May 2019 34	Luceafărul Oradea	1–0	Daco-Getica București	Sânmartin
11:00 EEST (UTC+3)	D.Paraschiv 34'	Report		Stadium: Luceafărul; Attendance: 200; Referee: Omar Dumitrică (Craiova)

15 May 2019 35	Metaloglobus București	0–1	Luceafărul Oradea	Bucharest
11:00 EEST (UTC+3)		Report	Nemeș 77'	Stadium: Metaloglobus; Attendance: 300; Referee: Florin Andrei (Târgu Mureș)

18 May 2019 36	Luceafărul Oradea	5–0	Farul Constanța	Sânmartin
13:00 EEST (UTC+3)	D.Paraschiv 15'; Bebey 45+2'; V.Pop 64' (pen.); Preoteasa 86'; Oroș 90+3' (pen.)	Report		Stadium: Luceafărul; Attendance: 250; Referee: Dan Dreve (Cluj-Napoca)

25 May 2019 37	Chindia Târgoviște	4–1	Luceafărul Oradea	Târgoviște
14:00 EEST (UTC+3)	D.Florea 28'; L.Mihai 65'; Novac 89'; Cherchez 90+1'	Report	D.Paraschiv 17'	Stadium: Eugen Popescu; Attendance: 5,000; Referee: Horia Mladinovici (Bucharest)

1 June 2019 38	Luceafărul Oradea	6–0	Dacia Unirea Brăila	Sânmartin
13:00 EEST (UTC+3)	D.Paraschiv 8', 17' (pen.), 33'; V.Pop 10', 73'; Al.Dulca 89'	Report		Stadium: Luceafărul; Attendance: 150; Referee: Paul Unimătan (Zalău)

=== Cupa României ===
11 September 2018 Fourth Round	Gloria Lunca-Teuz Cermei	1–4	Luceafărul Oradea	Cermei
16:30 EEST (UTC+3)	Vlad 78'	Report	Ludușan 10'; Dulca 47'; Țîră 50'; Peter 73'	Stadium: Comunal-Central; Attendance: 200; Referee: Claudiu Gaitin (Timișoara)

27 September 2018 Round of 32	Luceafărul Oradea	1–5	Astra Giurgiu	Sânmartin
16:00 EEST (UTC+3)	V.Pop 79'	Report	Bègue 64'; Zoua 66'; V.Gheorghe 70', 80', 90'	Stadium: Luceafărul; Attendance: 1,200; Referee: Lucian Rusandu (Sfântu Gheorghe)

== Statistics ==
=== Appearances and goals ===
As of 1 June 2019

No.	Pos	Player	Liga II		Cupa României		Total	
No.	Pos	Player	Apps	Goals	Apps	Goals	Apps	Goals
16	LW	Vasile Pop	34	15	1	1	35	16
9	CF	Daniel Paraschiv	33	14	1	0	34	14
8	LM	Alexandru Dulca	32	9	2	1	34	10
5	CB	Cristian Oroș	33	1	1	0	34	1
7	RM	Paul Mitrică	30	1	1	0	31	1
20	CM	Vlad Prejmerean	31	0	0	0	31	0
95	GK	Bogdan Moga	29	0	1	0	30	0
13	CF	Andrei Ludușan	27	4	1	1	28	5
23	CB	Alexandru Băican	27	0	1	0	28	0
6	CM	Gabriel Preoteasa	24	3	1	0	25	3
21	LB	Kevin Moihedja	22	0	1	0	23	0
10	CM	Paul Chiorean	18	0	2	0	20	0
11	LW	Constantin Roșu	17	0	1	0	18	0
–	AM	Claudiu Codoban	15	4	2	0	17	4
–	RW	Răzvan Gunie	15	0	2	0	17	0
2	CB	Vlad Opriș	15	1	2	0	17	1
15	CB	François Yabré	15	1	0	0	15	1
19	CF	Bertrand Bebey	13	2	0	0	13	2
14	RB	Adrian Ciul	13	0	0	0	13	0
–	CF	Cătălin Țîră	10	1	2	1	12	2
18	CM	Lü Yuefeng	12	0	0	0	12	0
–	RB	Cătălin Toriște	7	0	0	0	7	0
24	CM	Pavel Nemeș	6	1	0	0	6	1
–	CF	Sergiu Pop	5	0	1	0	6	0
1	GK	Ionuț Rus	6	0	0	0	6	0
4	RB	Alan Wanya	6	0	0	0	6	0
17	AM	Patrick Peter	4	0	1	1	5	1
–	LB	Ionuț Ban	5	0	0	0	5	0
22	RB	Flavius Drăgan	4	0	1	0	5	0
–	CB	Andrei Tânc	5	0	0	0	5	0
–	CM	Darius Lukács	4	0	0	0	4	0
12	GK	Sebastian Moroz	3	0	1	0	4	0
3	CB	Alexandru Core	2	0	1	0	3	0
–	CB	Ionuț Gruia	2	0	1	0	3	0
26	CF	Daniel Lăsconi	3	0	0	0	3	0
25	CM	Tudor Călin	2	0	0	0	2	0
–	GK	Alin Goia	1	0	0	0	1	0
–	CM	Paul Chiș-Toie	0	0	0	0	0	0
–	CM	Narcis Cîrlig	0	0	0	0	0	0
–	CM	Hery Kim	0	0	0	0	0	0

=== Squad statistics ===
	Liga II	Cupa României	Home	Away	Total Stats
Games played	38	2	20	20	40
Games won	14	1	11	4	15
Games drawn	10	0	5	5	10
Games lost	14	1	4	11	15
Goals scored	57	5	42	20	62
Goals conceded	59	6	21	44	65
Goal difference	-2	-1	+21	-24	-3
Clean sheets	14	0	10	4	14
Goal by Substitute	7	2	5	4	9
Players used	37	0	–	–	37
Yellow cards	101	2	56	47	103
Red cards	6	0	3	3	6
Winning rate	36.84%	50.00%	55.00%	20.00%	37.50%

Last updated: 1 June 2019
Source: Competitive matches

=== Goalscorers ===
As of 1 June 2019

Rank	Position	Country	Name	Liga II	Cupa României	Total
1	LM / CF	(Romania)	Vasile Pop	15	1	16
2	CF / ST	(Romania)	Daniel Paraschiv	14	0	14
3	AM / LM	(Romania)	Alexandru Dulca	9	1	10
4	CF / ST	(Romania)	Andrei Ludușan	4	1	5
5	AM	(Romania)	Claudiu Codoban	4	0	4
6	CM	(Romania)	Gabriel Preoteasa	3	0	3
7	CF / ST	(Cameroon)	Bertrand Bebey	2	0	2
8	CF / ST	(Romania)	Cătălin Țîră	1	1	2
9	CB	(Romania)	Vlad Opriș	1	0	1
10	CB	(Romania)	Cristian Oroș	1	0	1
11	CB	(Burkina Faso)	François Yabré	1	0	1
12	RM	(Romania)	Paul Mitrică	1	0	1
13	CM	(Romania)	Pavel Nemeș	1	0	1
14	AM	(Romania)	Patrick Peter	0	1	1
Total				57	5	62

=== Goal minutes ===
	1'–15'	16'–30'	31'–HT	46'–60'	61'–75'	76'–FT	Extra time	Forfeit
Goals	9	9	10	5	14	15	0	0
Percentage	14.52%	14.52%	16.13%	8.06%	22.58%	24.19%	0%	0%

Last updated:1 June 2019 (UTC)
Source: Soccerway

=== Hat-tricks ===
Country	Player	Against	Result	Date	Competition
(Romania)	Daniel Paraschiv	Dacia Unirea Brăila	6–0	1 June 2019	Liga II

=== Clean sheets ===
As of 1 June 2019

Rank	Country	Name	Liga II	Cupa României	Total	Games played
1	(Romania)	Bogdan Moga	8	0	8	29.5
2	(Romania)	Ionuț Rus	5	0	5	6
3	(Romania)	Sebastian Moroz	1	0	1	4.5
4	(Romania)	Alin Goia	0	0	0	1
Total			14	0	14	40

=== Disciplinary record ===
As of 1 June 2019

Rank	Position	Country	Name	Liga II			Cupa României			Total		
Rank	Position	Country	Name	Yellow card	(yellow card) (yellow-red card)	Red card	Yellow card	(yellow card) (yellow-red card)	Red card	Yellow card	(yellow card) (yellow-red card)	Red card
1	CB	(Romania)	Vlad Opriș	8	1	0	1	0	0	9	1	0
2	RM	(Romania)	Paul Mitrică	8	1	0	0	0	0	8	1	0
3	CM	(Romania)	Paul Chiorean	6	0	0	1	0	0	7	0	0
4	GK	(Romania)	Bogdan Moga	6	1	0	0	0	0	6	1	0
5	CB	(Romania)	Cristian Oroș	6	0	0	0	0	0	6	0	0
6	LW	(Romania)	Vasile Pop	6	0	0	0	0	0	6	0	0
7	CM	(Romania)	Vlad Prejmerean	6	0	0	0	0	0	6	0	0
8	CM	(Romania)	Gabriel Preoteasa	6	0	0	0	0	0	6	0	0
9	CB	(Romania)	Alexandru Băican	5	0	0	0	0	0	5	0	0
10	LM	(Romania)	Alexandru Dulca	5	0	0	0	0	0	5	0	0
11	LW	(Romania)	Constantin Roșu	5	0	0	0	0	0	5	0	0
12	CB	(Burkina Faso)	François Yabré	4	1	0	0	0	0	4	1	0
13	RW	(Romania)	Răzvan Gunie	4	0	0	0	0	0	4	0	0
14	CF	(Romania)	Andrei Ludușan	4	0	0	0	0	0	4	0	0
15	LB	(France)	Kevin Moihedja	4	0	0	0	0	0	4	0	0
16	CB	(Romania)	Andrei Tânc	3	1	0	0	0	0	3	1	0
17	CM	(China)	Lü Yuefeng	3	0	0	0	0	0	3	0	0
18	LB	(Romania)	Ionuț Ban	2	0	0	0	0	0	2	0	0
19	GK	(Romania)	Ionuț Rus	2	0	0	0	0	0	2	0	0
20	CM	(Romania)	Pavel Nemeș	1	0	1	0	0	0	1	0	1
21	CM	(Romania)	Tudor Călin	1	0	0	0	0	0	1	0	0
22	RB	(Romania)	Adrian Ciul	1	0	0	0	0	0	1	0	0
23	AM	(Romania)	Claudiu Codoban	1	0	0	0	0	0	1	0	0
24	RB	(Romania)	Flavius Drăgan	1	0	0	0	0	0	1	0	0
25	CF	(Romania)	Daniel Paraschiv	1	0	0	0	0	0	1	0	0
26	CF	(Romania)	Sergiu Pop	1	0	0	0	0	0	1	0	0
27	RB	(Belgium)	Alan Wanya	1	0	0	0	0	0	1	0	0
Total				101	5	1	2	0	0	103	5	1

=== Attendances ===
As of 1 June 2019

	Matches	Attendances	Average	High	Low
Liga II	19	4,500	237	1,000	50
Cupa României	1	1,200	1,200	1,200	1,200
Total	20	5,700	285	1,200	50

== See also ==
- 2018–19 Liga II
- 2018–19 Cupa României
