= Ronto =

Ronto can refer to:

- ronto-, a metric prefix denoting a factor of 10^{−27}
- Rontó, the Hungarian name for Rontău village, Sânmartin Commune, Bihor County, Romania
- Toronto, a city in Canada
- ronto, a fictional animal in the Star Wars franchise
