= Tunari (disambiguation) =

Tunari may refer to several places in Romania:

- Tunari, a commune in Ilfov County
- Tunari, a village in Bezdead Commune, Dâmbovița County
- Tunari, a village in Botoroaga Commune, Teleorman County
- Tunarii Noi and Tunarii Vechi, villages in Poiana Mare Commune, Dolj County

and to:

- Tunari (Bolivia)
