= Deac =

Deac is a surname. Notable people with the surname include:

- Augustin Deac (1928–2004), Romanian author
- Bogdan-Daniel Deac (born 2001), Romanian chess grandmaster
- Ciprian Deac (born 1986), Romanian footballer
- Gabriel Deac (born 1995), Romanian footballer
- Ioan Pap-Deac (born 1969), Romanian footballer
