= Ioan Ciordaș =

Romanian lawyer and activist (1877-1919)

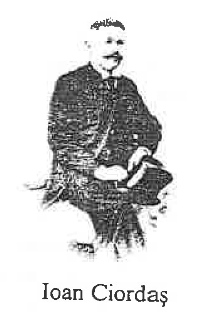
- Born: Ciurdariu; December 25, 1877
- Died: April 4, 1919
- Occupation(s): Lawyer and activist

Ioan Ciordaș (born Ciurdariu; December 25, 1877–April 4, 1919) was an Austro-Hungarian-born Romanian lawyer and activist.

Born in Betfia, Bihar County, (now Sânmartin, Bihor County), his father was a Greek-Catholic priest. He attended the Premonstratensian High School in Oradea, where the teachers changed his name to the more Hungarian-sounding Ciordaș. He then entered the law academy in the same city and finally Franz Joseph University in Cluj. The latter institution awarded him a doctorate of law in 1900. Settling in Beiuș in late 1899, Ciordaș began practicing law, taking over the office of Teodor Fâșie, then serving in the House of Representatives at Budapest. He was later hired in the office of Aurel Lazăr, handling cases in Beiuș, Oradea, Satu Mare, and Arad.

Ciordaș was deeply involved in patriotic and political activities as a member of the Romanian National Party (PNR) and of ASTRA. He was president of various cultural associations, including the Beiuș chapter of ASTRA, where in 1905 he helped re-found a choir. He founded a credit union in 1907. He ran in the 1906 Hungarian parliamentary election, but was defeated by a Hungarian candidate. The latter soon resigned, but was replaced by Vasile Lucaciu, as Ciordaș was on maneuvers with the Austro-Hungarian Army. In 1907, he organized a protest at Beiuș against the Magyarizing Apponyi laws. In 1913, he prevented the local Romanian girls’ school from shutting down by using credit union funds to pay the teachers’ salaries.

In autumn 1914, early in World War I, Ciordaș was drafted into the army and ordered to help set up military hospitals in Bihar County. In late 1918, as the Austro-Hungarian Empire collapsed, he took part in the Oradea meeting of the PNR executive that declared the Romanians’ self-determination. On November 4, 1918, he was named president of the Romanian National Council in Beiuș and member of the Oradea council. He was tasked with organizing a national guard and sent as a delegate to the Great National Assembly of Alba Iulia. Afterwards, he was elected to the Great Romanian National Council.

On the night of April 3/4, 1919, against the backdrop of the Hungarian–Romanian War, he and Nicolae Bolcaș were detained in Beiuș by Hungarian guards and taken to Lunca, where they were mutilated, murdered, and thrown into a ditch near a stream. They were found with eyes gouged out, their skulls cracked, a mixture of brains, bones, hair and blood in the head area. Ciordaș was buried with military honors on April 25. News of his assassination reached the temporary capital of Sibiu slowly: several days after the fact, the Directing Council named him Prefect of Bihor County; he would have been the first Romanian officer-holder. He left a wife and two children.

Beiuș has a bronze monument and a memorial plaque in memory of Bolcaș and Ciordaș, while a street and a high school bear the latter's name.
