= Mihai Eminescu National College (Oradea) =

- Colegiul Național "Mihai Eminescu" Oradea

Location
- Strada Episcop Roman Ciorogariu, Nr. 18; Oradea, Bihor County; Romania
- Coordinates: 47.0610°N 21.9309°E

Information
- Type: Public
- Established: December 2, 1699; 326 years ago
- Principal: Livia Cătălina Muntean
- Grades: first to twelfth grade
- Enrollment: c. 1600
- Website: eminescuoradea.ro

Mihai Eminescu National College (Romanian: Colegiul Național "Mihai Eminescu" Oradea) is a high school located at 18 Episcop Roman Ciorogariu Street, Oradea, Bihor County, Romania. It is named after Mihai Eminescu, the national poet, and is one of the most prestigious schools in Bihor County.

== History ==
The school was founded as an institution on 2 December 1699. From 1717 the institution worked as a Jesuit school, and from 1874 as a archigymnasium with the language of Latin teaching, gardianshiped by the Order of Canons Premonstratens. At this archigymnasium (in German Obergymnasium) was also the first Chair of Romanian language in Oradea, which was held by teachers: Alexandru Roman, Dionisie Grasscuţiu and Constantin Pavel. Another brilliant professor of the Oradea Archgymnasium was Károly Irén József, who established the telegraphic connection between Oradea and Sânmartin inside the school building. He also brought in Oradea the first Röntgen apparatus and contributed to the project elaboration for the tram line into the city. In the location of this school, functioned for a while the Academy of Law, which enjoyed the presence of famous names among its teachers: Iosif Vulcan, Emanuil Gojdu, Aurel Lazăr, and others. In the interwar period, functioned the Romanian-Hungarian Commercial High School also until 1924 the Faculty of Law. In 1959, through the unification of the Hungarian Classic Mixed High School with "Oltea Doamna" Romanian High School for Girls, was founded the High School of Philology and History which in 1990 it has become the "Mihai Eminescu" Theoretical High School. Since the school year 1999-2000, the school has been named "Mihai Eminescu" National College, a name that, even better, marks the status of a representative school in Bihor County. Throughout the years, the school has been visited by outstanding cultural personalities such as Mircea Zaciu, Augustin Buzura, Eugen Simion, Eugen Uricaru, Ana Blandiana, Nicolae Manolescu. The College also received the visit of Takayuki Ando, Minister of Education, Science and Culture of Japan.
