= Comunal Stadium (Diosig) =

Multi-use stadium in Diosig, Romania

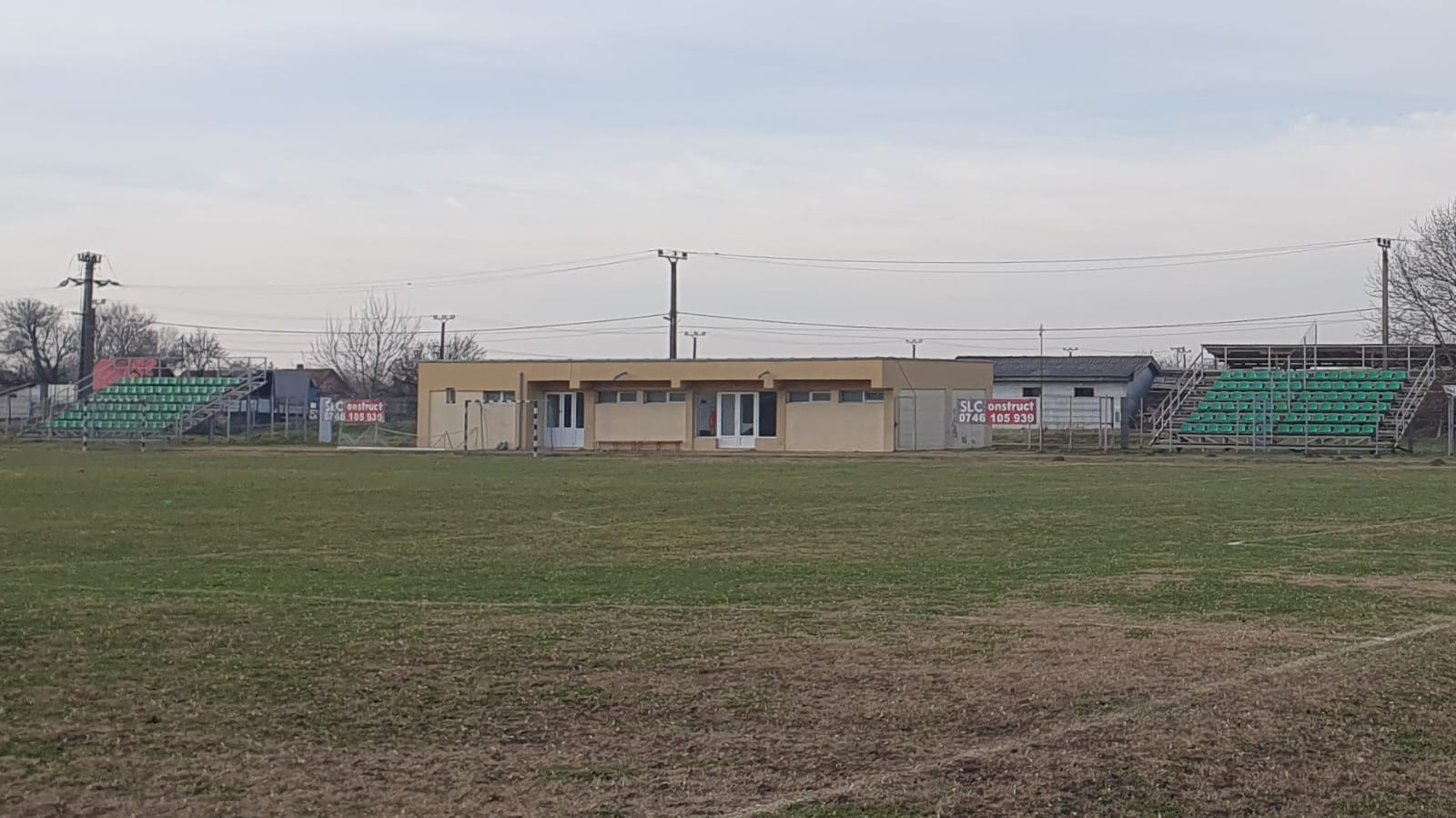
- Interactive map of Comunal Stadium
- Address: str. 23 August
- Location: Diosig, Romania
- Coordinates: 47°17′45.6″N 22°00′24.2″E
- Owner: Commune of Diosig
- Operator: Diosig Bihardiószeg
- Capacity: 1,000 (168 seated)
- Surface: Grass

Construction
- Opened: 1970
- Renovated: 2014–2015

Tenant
- Diosig Bihardiószeg (1970–present)

The Comunal Stadium is a multi-use stadium in Diosig, Romania. It is used mostly for football matches, is the home ground of CS Diosig Bihardiószeg and holds 1,000 people (168 on seats).
