= CS Diosig Bihardiószeg =

Romanian football club

Diosig Bihardiószeg
- Full name: Club Sportiv Diosig Bihardiószeg
- Nicknames: Diosiganii (The People from Diosig); Echipa dintre vii (The Team Between the Vineyards); Alb-negrii (The White and Blacks)
- Short name: Diosig
- Founded: 1955 as Recolta Diosig; 2004 as Phoenix Diosig; 2014 as CS Diosig
- Dissolved: 2025
- Ground: Comunal
- Capacity: 1,000 (300 seated)
- 2024–25: Liga III, Seria X, 10th (relegated)
Home colours	Away colours

Club Sportiv Diosig Bihardiószeg, commonly known as CS Diosig or simply as Diosig, was a Romanian professional football club based in Diosig, Romania, originally founded in 1950s and re-founded during the early 2000s and 2010s.

== History ==
=== Recolta, the Cup and two decades of sleep (1970–2014) ===
CS Diosig Bihardiószeg was established in 1955, under the name of Recolta Diosig, but played only at the level of county leagues (4th and 5th tiers) for its entire existence, until 2024. The biggest performance of the team based in Diosig was during the 1977–78 Cupa României season, when diosiganii achieved the Round of 32, where they were eliminated by the top-flight club Farul Constanța, score 0–6. The presence in the Round of 32 (of the Romanian Cup) would remained the most important performance in the history of local football, for the next decades. The squad of Recolta Diosig was formed by the following players: Vasile Barbua, Ioan Țîrț (goalkeepers); Nagy Attila, Nagy László, Iosif Mile, Pap József, Kalmár József, Viorel Știube, Vasile Popa, Iosif Madar, Iosif Sav, Dorel Blaj, Szilágyi László, Varga Sándor, Iosif Nica, Mircea Faur, Iosif Tolodi, Bokor István; Grifaton Zsolt (manager), Erdei Károly (chairman).

After 1992 the football survived in Diosig mostly through the local youth groups, then in 2012 a senior squad was enrolled again, at the level of the 5th Division, under the name of Phoenix Diosig. Phoenix was in fact the phoenix club of former Recolta and the squad was formed only by young players, grown in the youth groups. Phoenix spent two seasons in the division but with bad results, ranking on the bottom of the table, then the club was re-organized again, under the current structure of CS Diosig, in 2014.

=== Revival. New ideals (2014–2025) ===
The 2014 re-organization of the club was a good move, because after only one season, CS Diosig promoted back to the 4th Division, at the end of a strong battle against Locadin Țețchea. The team that brought back Diosig in the 4th tier, after 23 years of absence was formed by the following players: Vlad Ghețe, Peter Sabău, Emanuel Man (goalkeepers); Szűcs Tibor (captain), Karácsonyi Gergö, Florian Marc, Marcel Madar, Hegedüs Szabolcs, Gabriel Costea, Coriolan Hodișan, Bogdan Iambor, Gheorghe Vaida, Alin Maghiar, Flaviu Filimon, Petru Ciorba, Lolo Tibor, Mircea Onița, Cristian Morar, Sergiu Selegian, Emil Popa, Ramses Gado; Vigh Zoltán (manager), Marcel Madar (assistant), Sebastian Tamaș (chairman), Sztojka Dezsö (team manager). The good form of "the Team Between the Vineyards" was confirmed in the next seasons, when it was ranked 2nd (with the same number of points as the champion FC Hidișel) and 1st (at the end of the 2016–17 edition). Champion of Bihor County for the first time in its history, CS Diosig played a promotion play-off against Arad County champions, Șoimii Lipova, but lost 1–7 on aggregate.

After another 2nd place, at the end of 2022–23 season, CS Diosig started the 2023–24 season as the title favorite, despite some strong opponents, such as the tradionals Club Atletic Oradea and Bihorul Beiuș or "the dark horse" Foresta Tileagd. CS Diosig had a perfect run and lost only one game, in the last round of the season, against Club Atletic Oradea, but in the moment when diosiganii were sure for their spot in the promotion play-offs. "The white and blacks" secured the promotion to Liga III after an easy win against Maramureș County champion Academica Recea (9–0 on aggregate), promoting for the first time in the third tier, in the entire history of the club and of the football based in Diosig. This historical team of CS Diosig was formed by the following players: Eduard Beke, Jeremy Demeter (goalkeepers); Tibor Szűcs, Marcel Gal, Cosmin Letan, Laviniu Dărăban, Adrian Micaș, Adrian Popa, Claudiu Codoban, Raul Ember, Tobias Tamaș, Gabriel Costea, Florin Borțiș, Carlos Covaciu, Florin Pop, Sorin Ban, Raymond Lukács, Constantin Roșu, Cristian Cigan, Dănuț Borțiș; Mădălin Popa (manager), Constantin Sabău (chairman).

== Ground ==
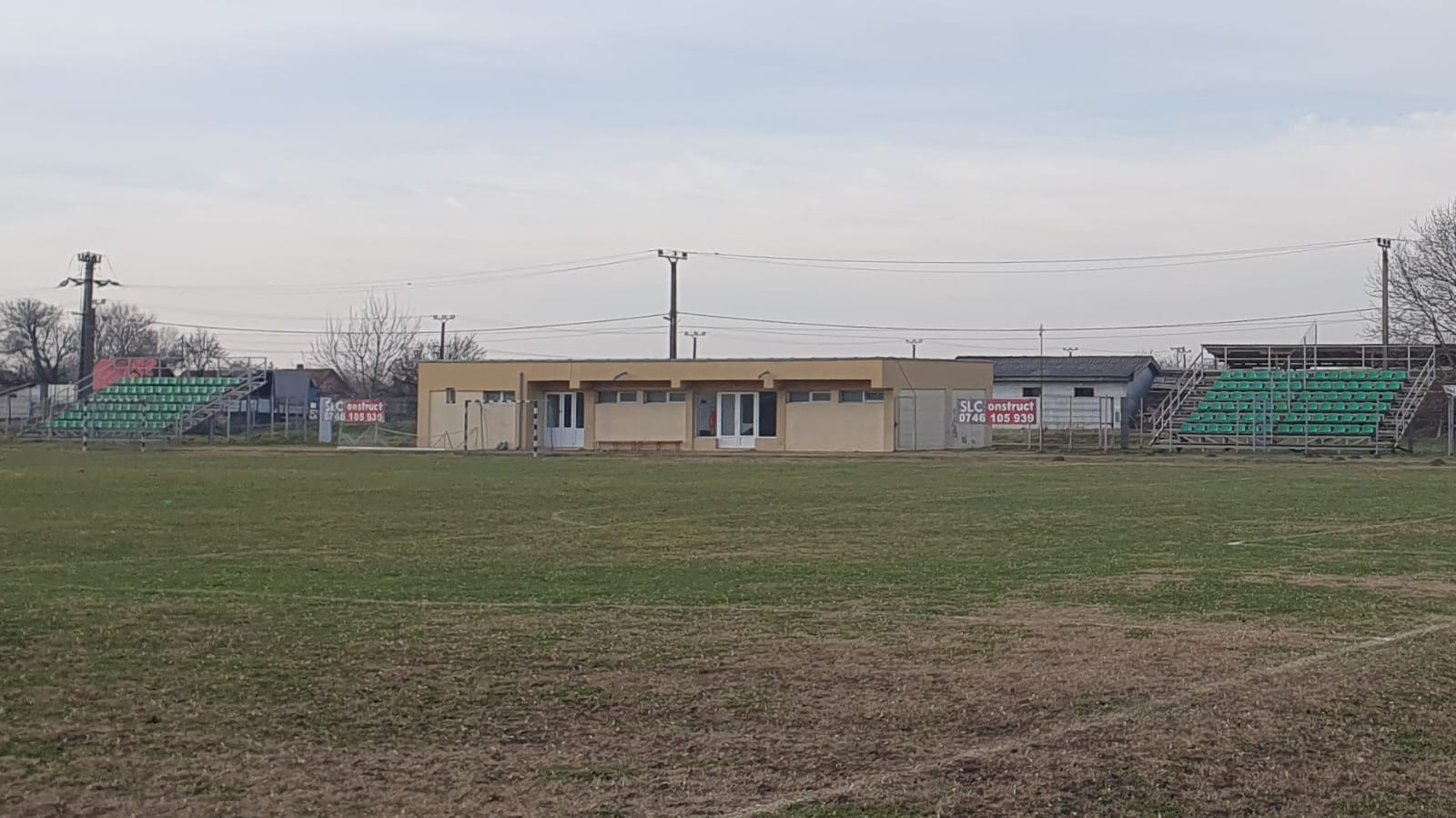
Comunal Stadium, current home ground of the club.

CS Diosig Bihardiószeg plays its home matches on Comunal Stadium in Diosig, with a capacity of 1,000 people (168 on seats) on the two existing stands.

== Honours ==
=== Leagues ===
Liga IV – Bihor County

- Winners (2): 2016–17, 2023–24
- Runners-up (1): 2015–16, 2022–23

==== Cups ====
Cupa României

- Round of 32 (1): 1977–78

Cupa României – Bihor County

- Winners (2): 2016–17, 2022–23

== League history ==
Season	Tier	Division	Place	Notes	Cupa României
2024–25	3	Liga III (Seria X)	10th	Relegated	

Season	Tier	Division	Place	Notes	Cupa României
2023–24	4	Liga IV (BH)	1st (C)	Promoted	
