= Iancu de Hunedoara National College =

- Colegiul Național "Iancu de Hunedoara"

Location
- Victoriei Street, Nr. 12; Hunedoara, Hunedoara County; Romania
- Coordinates: 45°45′03″N 22°54′16″E

Information
- Type: Public
- Established: 1953
- Headmaster: Florin Bucur
- Website: iancuhd.wordpress.com

Iancu de Hunedoara National College (Colegiul Național "Iancu de Hunedoara") is a high school located at 12 Victoriei Street, Hunedoara, Romania.

== Alumni ==
- Răzvan Lucescu (5–6th grades, 1980–1982)
- Alexandru Iacob (2007)
