= Alexandru Iacob =

Romanian footballer

Personal information
- Date of birth: 14 April 1989 (age 37)
- Place of birth: Hunedoara, Romania
- Height: 1.86 m (6 ft 1 in)
- Positions: Centre-back; defensive midfielder

Team information
- Current team: Budoni

Youth career
- –2006: Corvinul Hunedoara
- 2006–2007: Steaua București

Senior career*
| Years | Team | Apps | (Gls) |
| 2005–2006 | Corvinul Hunedoara | 41 | (1) |
| 2007–2011 | Steaua București | 2 | (0) |
| 2007–2011 | Steaua II București | 26 | (0) |
| 2007–2008 | → Gloria Buzău (loan) | 2 | (0) |
| 2010–2011 | → Victoria Brănești (loan) | 16 | (0) |
| 2011 | Oțelul Galați | 0 | (0) |
| 2012 | Viitorul Constanța | 8 | (0) |
| 2012–2013 | Delta Tulcea | 19 | (0) |
| 2013–2015 | Rapid București | 44 | (1) |
| 2015–2016 | Ethnikos Achna | 29 | (1) |
| 2016–2017 | Pafos | 22 | (2) |
| 2017 | Luceafărul Oradea | 3 | (0) |
| 2017–2020 | Rapid București | 58 | (11) |
| 2020–2022 | Mioveni | 50 | (0) |
| 2023 | Minaur Baia Mare | 6 | (0) |
| 2023–2024 | Metaloglobus București | 10 | (0) |
| 2024– | Budoni | 0 | (0) |

International career
| 2006 | Romania U17 | 6 | (0) |
| 2008 | Romania U19 | 1 | (0) |
- * Club domestic league appearances and goals as of 5 September 2024

Alexandru Iacob (born 14 April 1989) is a Romanian footballer who plays as a centre-back for Eccellenza Sardinia club Budoni.

== Career ==
Iacob attended the Iancu de Hunedoara National College in his native city, Hunedoara, graduating in 2007. He began his football career playing at Corvinul Hunedoara youngsters. In 2005, he moved to the senior team, where he played 41 games and scored a goal. Iacob is also the captain of the Romania under-17 national team. In 2007, he signed with Steaua București.

On 6 August 2009 played his first match in Steaua's shirt in the UEFA Europa League against Motherwell, Steaua won away with 3–1. In January 2010, Iacob was demoted to the B squad.

== Honours ==
Steaua II București

- Liga III: 2008–09

Rapid București

- Liga III: 2018–19
- Liga IV – Bucharest: 2017–18

== Notes ==
^1 The 2008–2009 Liga III appearances and goals made for Steaua II București are unavailable.
