= Lucian Goge =

Romanian footballer

Personal information
- Full name: Petre Lucian Goge
- Date of birth: 29 September 1991 (age 35)
- Place of birth: Poiana Mare, Romania
- Height: 1.77 m (5 ft 10 in)
- Positions: Left back; left midfielder

Team information
- Current team: Metaloglobus București
- Number: 29

Youth career
- 2004–2008: Școala de Fotbal Gheorghe Popescu

Senior career*
Years	Team	Apps	(Gls)
2008–2010	Râmnicu Vâlcea	55	(3)
2010–2011	Unirea Urziceni	9	(0)
2011	ALRO Slatina	8	(1)
2011–2012	FCM Târgu Mureș	5	(0)
2012–2013	ACS Poli Timișoara	14	(1)
2013–2014	FCU Craiova	18	(0)
2014–2015	Juventus București	24	(5)
2015–2016	CSMS Iași	0	(0)
2016–2017	Brașov	27	(3)
2017	Luceafărul Oradea	3	(2)
2017–2022	Rapid București	119	(43)
2022	Concordia Chiajna	2	(0)
2022–2023	Metaloglobus București	18	(0)
Total		302	(58)

International career^{‡}
2011	Romania U21	2	(0)
- * Club domestic league appearances and goals as of 1 May 2023 ‡ National team caps and goals as of 30 March 2011

Petre Lucian Goge (born 29 September 1991 in Poiana Mare), also known as Petre Goge or Lucian Goge, is a Romanian footballer who plays for Liga II club Metaloglobus București. Mainly a left back, he can also play as a left midfielder.

== Career statistics ==
=== Club ===
As of match played 19 September 2022

Appearances and goals by club, season and competition
Club	Season	League			National Cup (Note: Includes Cupa României)		Europe		Other		Total	
Club	Season	Division	Apps	Goals	Apps	Goals	Apps	Goals	Apps	Goals	Apps	Goals
Râmnicu Vâlcea	2008–09	Liga II	30	0	0	0	0	0	0	0	30	0
Râmnicu Vâlcea	2009–10	Liga II	25	3	0	0	0	0	0	0	25	3
Râmnicu Vâlcea	Total		55	0	0	0	0	0	0	0	55	3
Unirea Urziceni	2010–11	Liga I	9	0	1	0	0	0	0	0	10	0
Unirea Urziceni	Total		9	0	1	0	0	0	0	0	10	0
ALRO Slatina	2010–11	Liga II	8	1	0	0	0	0	0	0	8	1
ALRO Slatina	Total		8	1	0	0	0	0	0	0	8	1
FCM Târgu Mureș	2011–12	Liga I	5	0	2	0	0	0	0	0	7	0
FCM Târgu Mureș	Total		5	0	2	0	0	0	0	0	7	0
ACS Poli Timișoara	2012–13	Liga II	14	1	0	0	0	0	0	0	14	1
ACS Poli Timișoara	Total		14	1	0	0	0	0	0	0	14	1
FCU Craiova	2013–14	Liga II	18	0	1	0	0	0	0	0	19	0
FCU Craiova	Total		18	0	1	0	0	0	0	0	19	0
Juventus București	2014–15	Liga III	24	5	0	0	0	0	0	0	24	5
Juventus București	Total		24	5	0	0	0	0	0	0	24	5
CSMS Iași	2015–16	Liga I	0	0	1	0	0	0	0	0	1	0
CSMS Iași	Total		0	0	1	0	0	0	0	0	1	0
Brașov	2016–17	Liga II	27	3	0	0	0	0	0	0	27	3
Brașov	Total		27	3	0	0	0	0	0	0	27	3
Luceafărul Oradea	2017–18	Liga II	3	2	0	0	0	0	0	0	3	2
Luceafărul Oradea	Total		3	2	0	0	0	0	0	0	3	2
Rapid București	2017–18	Liga IV	32	29	5	6	0	0	0	0	37	35
Rapid București	2018–19	Liga III	27	9	5	1	0	0	0	0	32	10
Rapid București	2019–20	Liga II	21	2	3	0	0	0	0	0	24	2
Rapid București	2020–21	Liga II	23	1	1	0	0	0	0	0	24	1
Rapid București	2021–22	Liga I	16	2	1	0	0	0	0	0	17	2
Rapid București	Total		119	43	15	7	0	0	0	0	134	50
Concordia Chiajna	2022–23	Liga II	2	0	0	0	0	0	0	0	2	0
Concordia Chiajna	Total		2	0	0	0	0	0	0	0	2	0
Metaloglobus București	2022–23	Liga II	2	0	0	0	0	0	0	0	2	0
Metaloglobus București	Total		2	0	0	0	0	0	0	0	2	0
Career Total			286	55	20	7	0	0	0	0	306	62

== Honours ==
Rapid București

- Liga III: 2018–19
- Liga IV – Bucharest: 2017–18
