= Alin Zaharia =

Romanian footballer

Personal information
- Full name: Alin Marian Zaharia
- Date of birth: 18 June 1987 (age 39)
- Place of birth: Bucharest, Romania
- Height: 1.82 m (5 ft 11 1/2 in)
- Position: Striker

Team information
- Current team: Afumați
- Number: 7

Senior career*
Years	Team	Apps	(Gls)
2010–2013	Afumați	?	(4)
2013–2014	Concordia Chiajna	15	(2)
2014–2015	Voluntari	4	(0)
2015–	Afumați	35	(10)
- * Club domestic league appearances and goals as of 3 June 2018

Alin Zaharia is a Romanian footballer who plays for CS Afumați in Liga II.

== Career ==
=== Afumați ===
Alin Zaharia started his career on 2010, at then-Liga IV side CS Afumați. In 2011, he earned with Afumați promotion in Liga III. On 29 August 2011, he scored 4 goals in a 5-1 victory against Dunărea Călăraşi. In 2011-2012 season, he was all Liga III series goal scorer. In 2012, he earned "Liga III The best Player of the Year" distinction, offered by Ilfov Sport.

=== Concordia Chiajna ===
In August 2013, Zaharia signed with Liga I side Concordia Chiajna. On 19 August, he scored a goal in the 3-0 victory against Universitatea Cluj. He scored again on 23 September, in 1-1 draw against Oțelul Galați.
