= Stadionul Luceafărul =

Multi-use stadium in Sânmartin, Romania

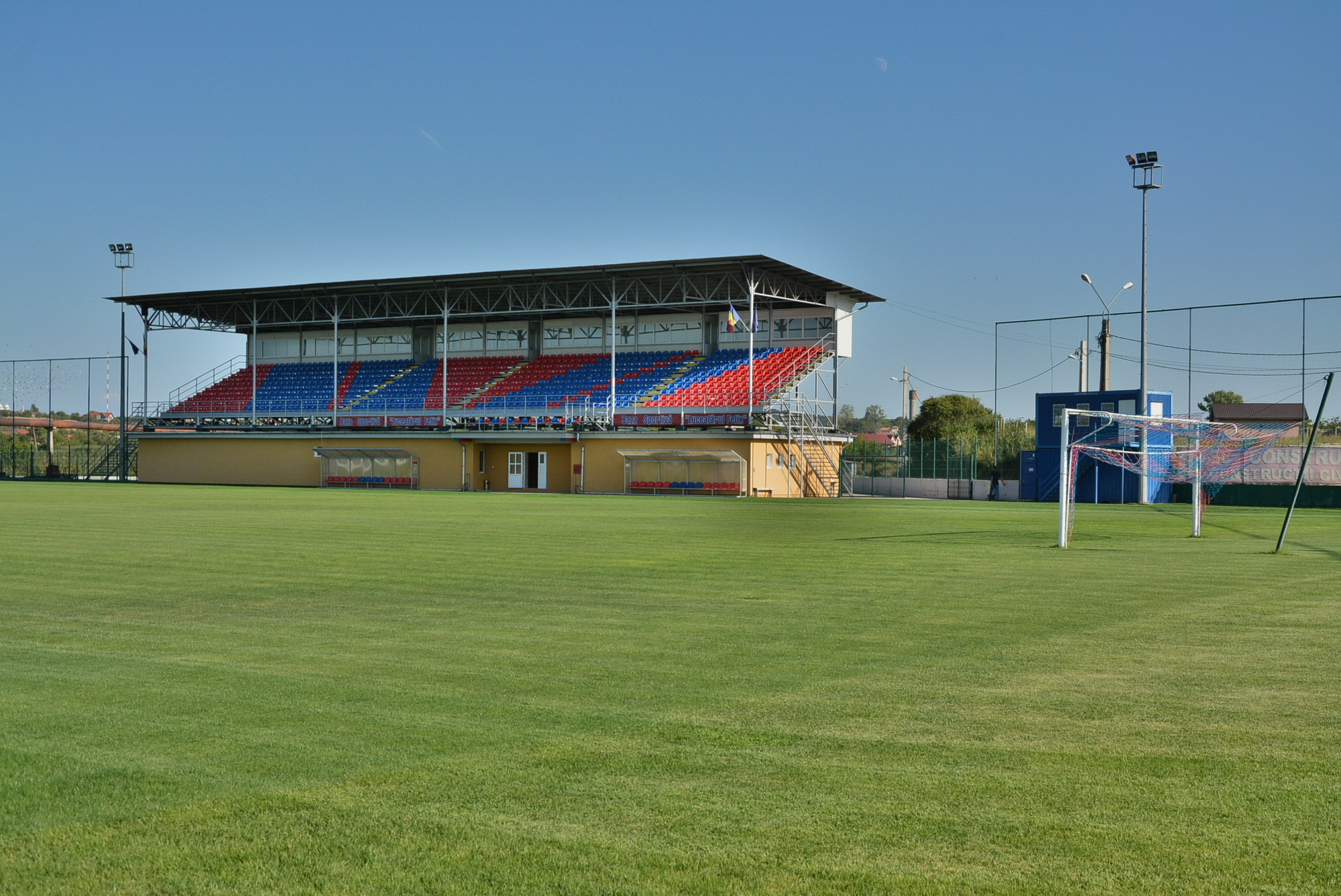
- Interactive map of Stadionul Luceafărul
- Address: Str. Stadionului
- Location: Sânmartin, Romania
- Coordinates: 47°00′26.7″N 21°58′40.6″E
- Owner: Luceafărul Oradea
- Operator: Luceafărul Oradea
- Capacity: 2,200 (1,500 seated)
- Surface: Grass
- Field size: 105 x 68m

Construction
- Groundbreaking: 2010
- Opened: 2011

Tenants
- Luceafărul Oradea (2011–present); Sânmartin (2013–2015)

Luceafărul Stadium is a multi-use stadium in Sânmartin, Romania. It is currently used mostly for football matches and is the home ground of Luceafărul Oradea. The stadium holds 2,200 people.

== Gallery ==
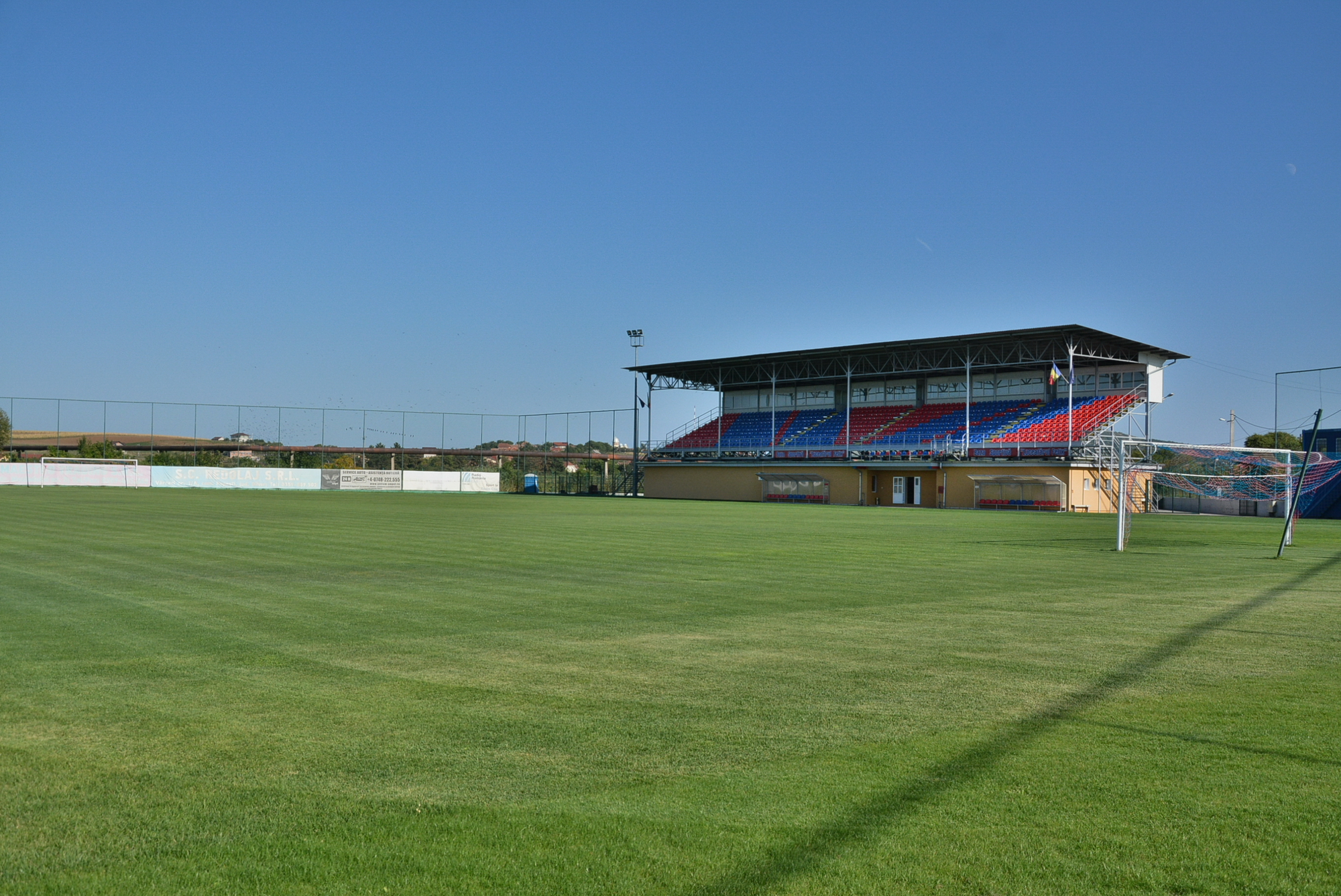
Main Stand from the opposite part

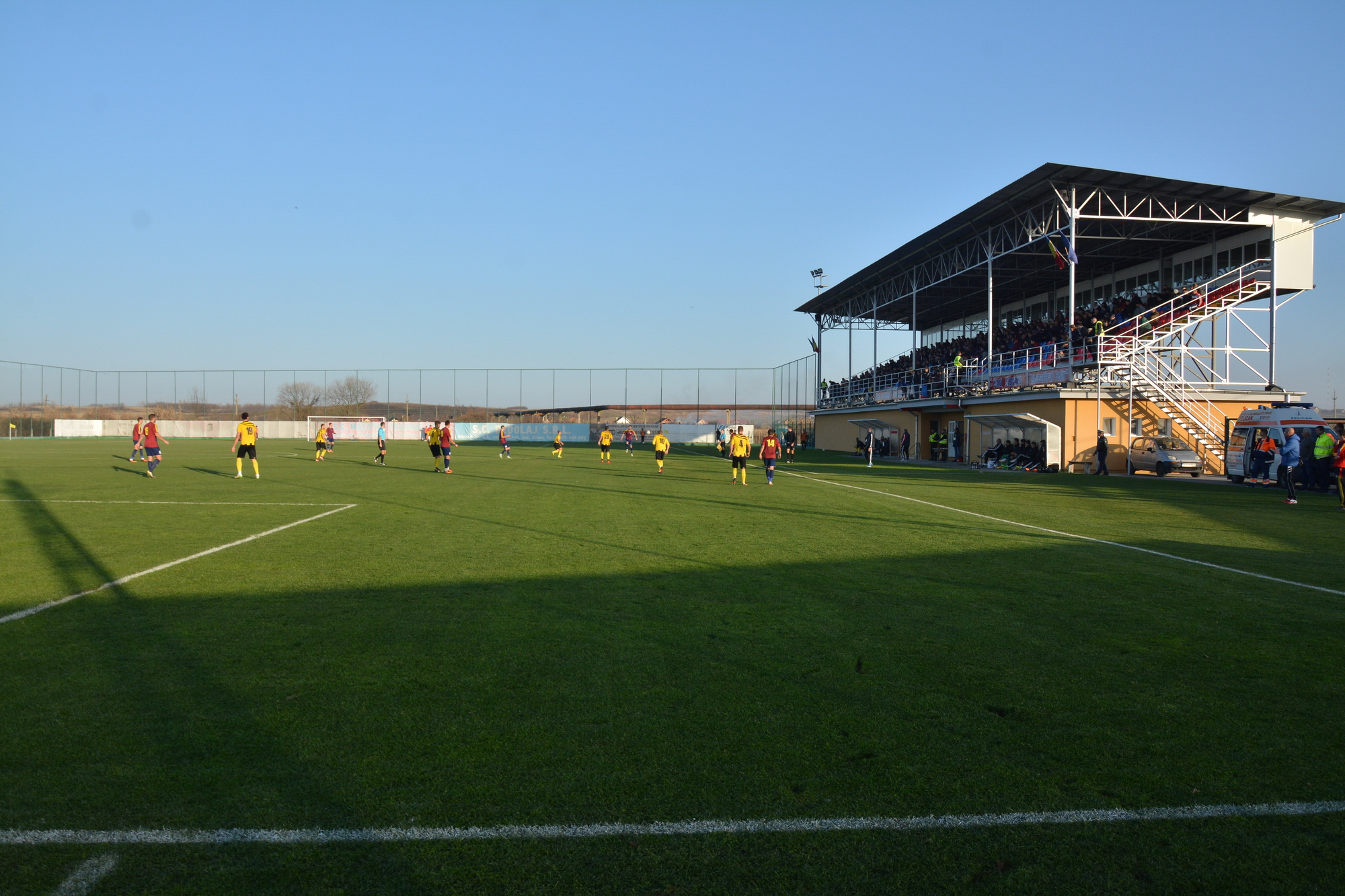
Stadium panorama from the West End
