= Andrei Tânc =

Romanian footballer

Andrei Tînc
Personal information
- Full name: Andrei Simion Tînc
- Date of birth: 3 July 1985 (age 41)
- Place of birth: Reșița, Romania
- Height: 1.88 m (6 ft 2 in)
- Position: Defender

Youth career
- –2005: CSM Reșița

Senior career*
| Years | Team | Apps | (Gls) |
| 2004–2008 | FCM Reșița | 55 | (2) |
| 2008–2009 | Arieșul Turda | 19 | (1) |
| 2009–2010 | Bihor Oradea | 24 | (1) |
| 2010–2011 | UTA Arad | 20 | (0) |
| 2011–2012 | Voința Sibiu | 16 | (0) |
| 2012–2013 | Bihor Oradea | 18 | (0) |
| 2013–2014 | Rapid București | 29 | (0) |
| 2015–2017 | CFR Cluj | 19 | (0) |
| 2017–2018 | Luceafărul Oradea | 31 | (3) |
| 2019–2020 | Ripensia Timișoara | 28 | (0) |
| 2020–2021 | Minaur Baia Mare | 13 | (2) |
| Total | | 272 | (9) |
- * Club domestic league appearances and goals

Andrei Simion Tînc (born 3 July 1985) is a Romanian former professional footballer who played as a defender.

== Honours ==
CFR Cluj

- Cupa României: 2015–16
- Supercupa României runner-up: 2016

Minaur Baia Mare

- Liga III: 2020–21
