= Marius Matei =

Romanian footballer

Personal information
- Date of birth: 1 February 1984 (age 42)
- Place of birth: Galați, Romania
- Height: 1.92 m (6 ft 4 in)
- Position: Forward

Team information
- Current team: Oțelul Galați (physiotherapist)

Youth career
- –2002: Dunărea Galați

Senior career*
Years	Team	Apps	(Gls)
2002–2004	Dunărea Galați	13	(8)
2004–2005	Dacia Unirea Brăila	28	(7)
2005–2007	Botoșani	52	(8)
2007–2008	Vaslui	22	(2)
2009	Botoșani	9	(5)
2009–2010	Oțelul Galați	6	(0)
2010	→ Botoșani (loan)	5	(1)
2010–2012	Botoșani	36	(11)
2012	Farul Constanța	11	(1)
2013	Olt Slatina	5	(1)
2013	Gloria Buzău	8	(0)
2014	Dunărea Galați	15	(2)
2014	Rapid CFR Suceava	14	(10)
2015	Voluntari	10	(4)
2015–2016	FC Brașov	29	(19)
2016	Foresta Suceava	17	(6)
2017	Luceafărul Oradea	12	(9)
2017–2018	Foresta Suceava	21	(12)
2018	Oțelul Galați	16	(4)
2019	Crișul Chișineu-Criș	13	(3)
2019–2020	Oțelul Galați	24	(20)
2021	Avântul Valea Mărului	8	(0)
Total		374	(133)

Managerial career
- 2025–: Oțelul Galați (physiotherapist)
- * Club domestic league appearances and goals

Marius Matei (born 1 February 1984) is a former Romanian professional footballer who played as a forward, currently physiotherapist at Liga I club Oțelul Galați.

== Honours ==
Dunărea Galați

- Divizia C: 2003–04

Vaslui

- UEFA Intertoto Cup: 2008

Voluntari

- Liga II: 2014–15
