= Ioan Pap-Deac =

Romanian footballer

Personal information
- Date of birth: 17 October 1969 (age 57)
- Place of birth: Derna, Romania
- Height: 1.91 m (6 ft 3 in)
- Position: Goalkeeper

Team information
- Current team: SCM Zalău (GK Coach)

Youth career
- Bihor Oradea

Senior career*
Years	Team	Apps	(Gls)
1989–1995	Bihor Oradea	70	(0)
1995–1997	Național București	19	(0)
1998	Olimpia Satu Mare	0	(0)
1998	Universitatea Cluj	9	(0)
1999	Unirea Dej	5	(0)
1999–2002	Baia Mare	59	(8)
2002–2004	Gloria Bistrița	1	(0)
Total		163	(8)

Managerial career
- 2006–2007: FC U Craiova (GK Coach)
- 2010: Bihor Oradea (GK Coach)
- 2010–2013: Luceafărul Oradea (GK Coach)
- 2014–2016: Luceafărul Oradea (GK Coach)
- 2016: Crișul Chișineu-Criș (GK Coach)
- 2016–2019: Luceafărul Oradea (GK Coach)
- 2019: Viitorul Târgu Jiu (GK Coach)
- 2020–2022: Luceafărul Oradea (GK Coach)
- 2023–2024: Victoria Carei (GK Coach)
- 2024–: SCM Zalău (GK Coach)
- * Club domestic league appearances and goals as of 14:55, 30 October 2024 (UTC)

Ioan Pap-Deac (born 17 October 1969) is a Romanian professional footballer who played as a goalkeeper.
