= Andrei Cordoș =

Romanian footballer

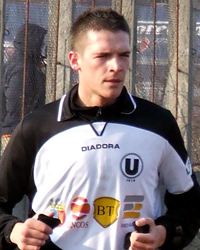
- Cordos in 2008

Personal information
- Full name: Andrei Alexandru Cordoș
- Date of birth: 6 June 1988 (age 38)
- Place of birth: Câmpia Turzii, Romania
- Height: 1.92 m (6 ft 4 in)
- Position: Centre-back

Youth career
- CRD Cluj

Senior career*
Years	Team	Apps	(Gls)
2005–2009	Universitatea Cluj	56	(2)
2009–2011	Frosinone	4	(0)
2010–2011	→ Târgu Mureș (loan)	18	(1)
2012	Târgu Mureș	12	(1)
2012–2014	Vaslui	23	(0)
2014	Dinamo București	13	(2)
2015	Pandurii Târgu Jiu	15	(2)
2015	Botoșani	11	(0)
2016–2017	Târgu Mureș	17	(0)
2017	Maziya	20	(2)
2017	Luceafărul Oradea	4	(0)
2017–2019	Universitatea Cluj	50	(4)
2019	Žalgiris	10	(1)
Total		253	(15)

International career
2007	Romania U19	3	(1)
2009	Romania U21	4	(0)
- * Club domestic league appearances and goals as of 30 November 2019

Andrei Alexandru Cordoș (born 6 June 1988) is a Romanian footballer who plays defender.

== Club career ==
Cordoș started to play football at CRD Cluj youth team. He moved to Universitatea Cluj and in 2006 he made his debut for the first team. He became one of the best defenders of Universitatea Cluj. The Romanian club had offers for Andrei Cordoș from Lazio and Steaua București but the club officials refused to sell him. In 2007 Cordoș helped Universitatea Cluj to promote to Liga I.

In summer 2019, Cordoș became a member of Lithuanian Žalgiris. After 2019 season he left Žalgiris. In 2019 A lyga he played 10 matches and scored one goal.

== National team ==
Cordoș played three times for the Romania national under-19 football team scoring one goal and four times for the Romania national under-21 football team.

== Honours ==
=== Club ===
Maziya

- Maldivian FA Charity Shield: 2017
