= Poiana Mare =

- Commune
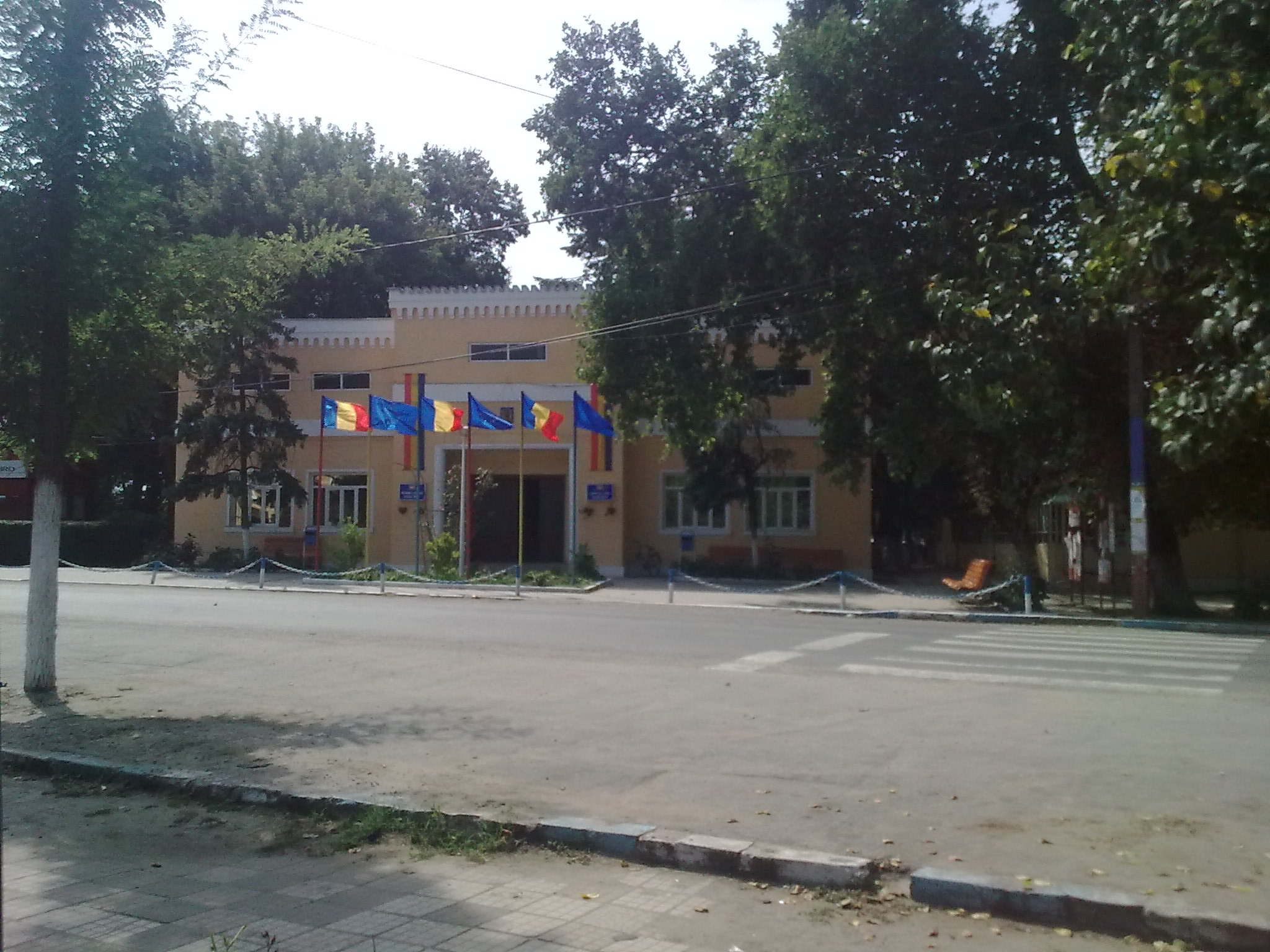
- Poiana Mare town hall

- Coat of arms

- Location in Romania
- Coordinates: 43°56′N 23°5′E
- Country: Romania
- County: Dolj

Government
  - Mayor (2020–2024): Viorel Oprescu (PNL)
- Area: 163.94 km^{2} (63.30 sq mi)
- Elevation: 42 m (138 ft)
- Population (2021-12-01): 9,047
  - Density: 55.18/km^{2} (142.9/sq mi)
- Time zone: UTC+02:00 (EET)
  - Summer (DST): UTC+03:00 (EEST)
- Postal code: 207470
- Area code: +(40) 251
- Vehicle reg.: DJ
- Website: www.poianamare.ro

Poiana Mare is a commune in Dolj County, Oltenia, Romania with a population of 9,047 as of 2021. It is composed of three villages: Poiana Mare, Tunarii Noi, and Tunarii Vechi.

== Geography ==
The commune is located at the southwestern extremity of Dolj County, 14 km (8.7 mi) southeast of Calafat, a port city on the Danube, and 85 km (53 mi) southwest of the county seat, Craiova.

Poiana Mare is crossed by the national road DN55A, which starts in the port town of Bechet, 82 km (51 mi) to the east, and ends in Calafat. The Poiana Mare train station serves the CFR Line 913, a 7 km (4.3 mi)-long railway that connects the commune to Golenți, a component village of Calafat.

== Demographics ==
Historical population
Year	Pop.	±%
2002	12,728	—
2011	10,740	−15.6%
2021	9,047	−15.8%
Source: Census data

At the 2021 census, the commune had 9,047 inhabitants; of those, 85.53% were Romanians and 4.23% Roma.

== Natives ==
- Petre Cănciulescu (1877–?), major general
- Lucian Goge (born 1991), footballer
- Gheorghe Nețoiu (born 1959), businessman and politician
