= Constantin Roșu =

Romanian footballer

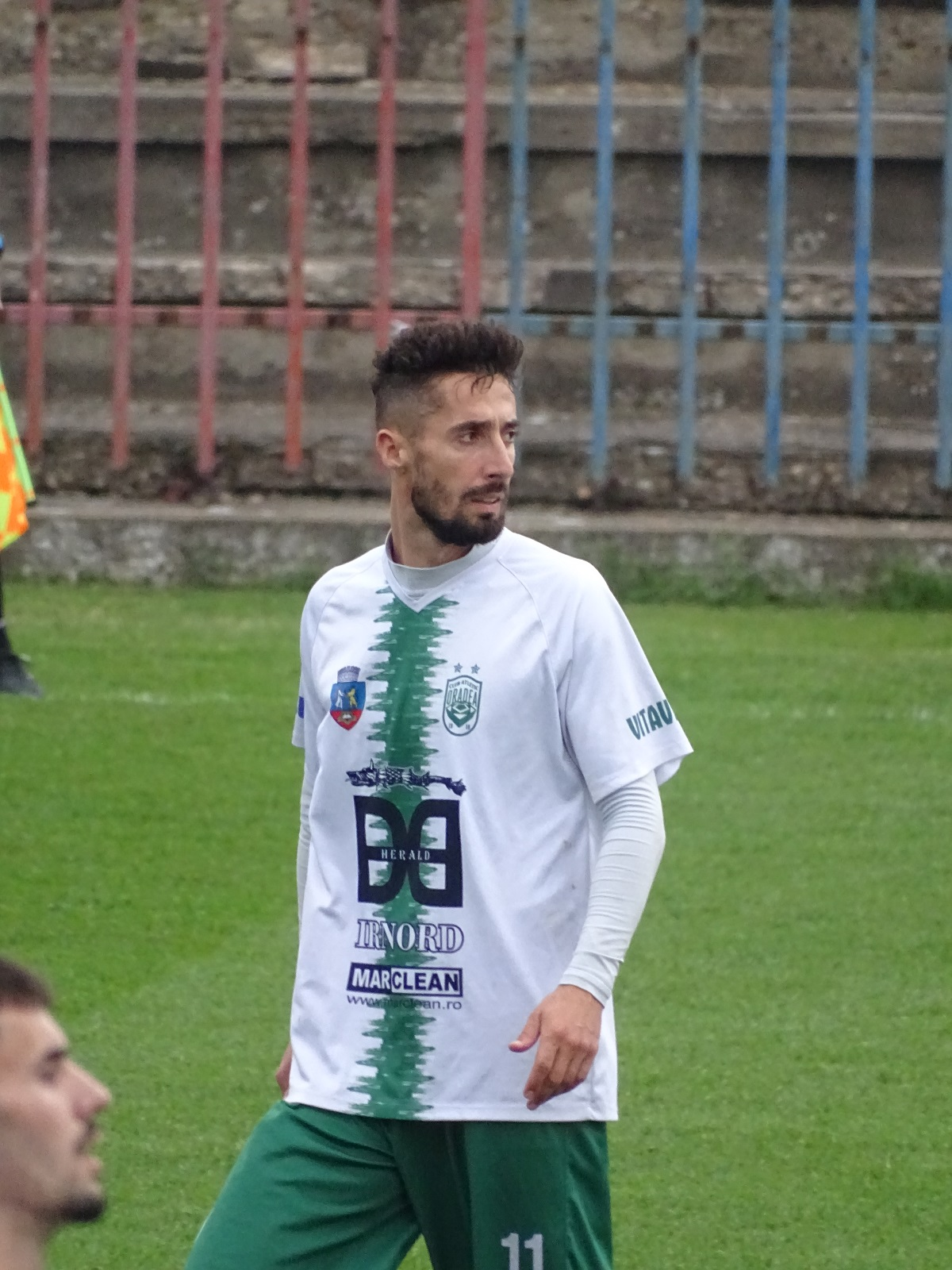
- Roșu playing for CAO (2020)

Personal information
- Full name: Constantin Virgil Roșu
- Date of birth: 26 May 1990 (age 36)
- Place of birth: Oradea, Romania
- Height: 1.76 m (5 ft 9 in)
- Positions: Right midfielder; forward

Team information
- Current team: Vadu Crișului
- Number: 18

Youth career
- 2001–2004: Juventus Oradea
- 2005–2009: Kinder Paleu

Senior career*
Years	Team	Apps	(Gls)
2010–2013	Luceafărul Oradea	41	(11)
2013–2014	Gloria Bistrița	19	(4)
2014–2015	Luceafărul Oradea	26	(51)
2015	Botoșani	2	(0)
2016–2019	Luceafărul Oradea	66	(14)
2019	Crișul Chișineu-Criș	13	(2)
2020	Sânmartin	1	(0)
2020–2022	CA Oradea	24	(1)
2022–2023	FC Bihor	2	(0)
2023–2025	Diosig Bihardiószeg	40	(15)
2025–2026	CA Oradea	23	(3)
2026–	Vadu Crișului	3	(1)
- * Club domestic league appearances and goals as of 16:35, 1 October 2026 (UTC)

Constantin Virgil Roșu (born 26 May 1990) is a Romanian professional footballer who plays as a right midfielder or forward for ACS Vadu Crișului. In his career, Roșu also played for teams such as Luceafărul Oradea, Gloria Bistrița, FC Botoșani, Diosig Bihardiószeg or CA Oradea, among others.

Constantin Roșu was born on May 26, 1990, in Oradea.

== Honours ==
Luceafărul Oradea

- Liga III: 2010–11, 2015–16
- Liga IV: 2014–15

Diosig Bihardiószeg

- Liga IV: 2023–24
