= Marius Feher =

Romanian professional footballer

Personal information
- Full name: Marius Ioan Feher
- Date of birth: 8 June 1989 (age 37)
- Place of birth: Bistrița, Romania
- Height: 1.80 m (5 ft 11 in)
- Position: Midfielder

Team information
- Current team: CS Florești

Youth career
- –2010: Gloria Bistrița

Senior career*
Years	Team	Apps	(Gls)
2010–2014	Gloria Bistrița	64	(12)
2010–2011	→ Unirea Dej (loan)	?	(?)
2014–2015	Metalul Reșița	43	(6)
2016–2018	Luceafărul Oradea	61	(2)
2019–	CS Florești	0	(0)
- * Club domestic league appearances and goals as of 21 February 2019

Marius Ioan Feher (born 8 June 1989) is a Romanian professional footballer who plays as a midfielder for CS Florești.
