= Cristian Lupuț =

Romanian footballer and manager

Personal information
- Full name: Cristian Ciprian Lupuț
- Date of birth: 2 September 1977 (age 49)
- Place of birth: Oradea, Romania
- Height: 1.85 m (6 ft 1 in)
- Position: Defender

Team information
- Current team: SCM Zalău (manager)

Youth career
- Viitorul Oradea

Senior career*
Years	Team	Apps	(Gls)
1997–1998	Olimpia Satu Mare	17	(0)
1998–2000	Național București	1	(0)
1999	→ Olimpia Satu Mare (loan)	29	(1)
2000	→ Cimentul Fieni (loan)	4	(0)
2001	Unirea Dej	?	(?)
2001–2004	Ceahlăul Piatra Neamț	62	(3)
2004–2006	Bihor Oradea	64	(7)
2007	Petrolul Ploiești	31	(0)
2008	Concordia Chiajna	11	(2)
2008–2010	FCM Târgu Mureș	49	(7)
2011	Arieșul Turda	11	(0)
2011–2012	Luceafărul Oradea	29	(2)
2013	Oșorhei	?	(?)
2014	FC Hidișelu de Sus	?	(?)
2014–2015	CS Mădăras	?	(?)
Total		308	(22)

Managerial career
- 2014–2016: CS Mădăras (player-manager)
- 2016: Luceafărul Oradea (assistant)
- 2017: Luceafărul Oradea
- 2017–2018: Luceafărul Oradea (assistant)
- 2018–2019: Luceafărul Oradea
- 2019–2020: Viitorul Târgu Jiu
- 2020: Aerostar Bacău
- 2021: Luceafărul Oradea
- 2021: Viitorul Târgu Jiu
- 2022–: SCM Zalău
- * Club domestic league appearances and goals as of 4 April 2021

Cristian Ciprian Lupuț (born 2 September 1977) is a Romanian former professional footballer and currently a manager. As a footballer, Lupuț played for teams such as: Olimpia Satu Mare, Ceahlăul Piatra Neamț, Bihor Oradea, Petrolul Ploiești or Târgu Mureș, among others. After retirement, he started to work as a football manager and since 2014 coached CS Mădăras, Luceafărul Oradea and Viitorul Târgu Jiu.
