= Claudiu Codoban =

Romanian professional footballer

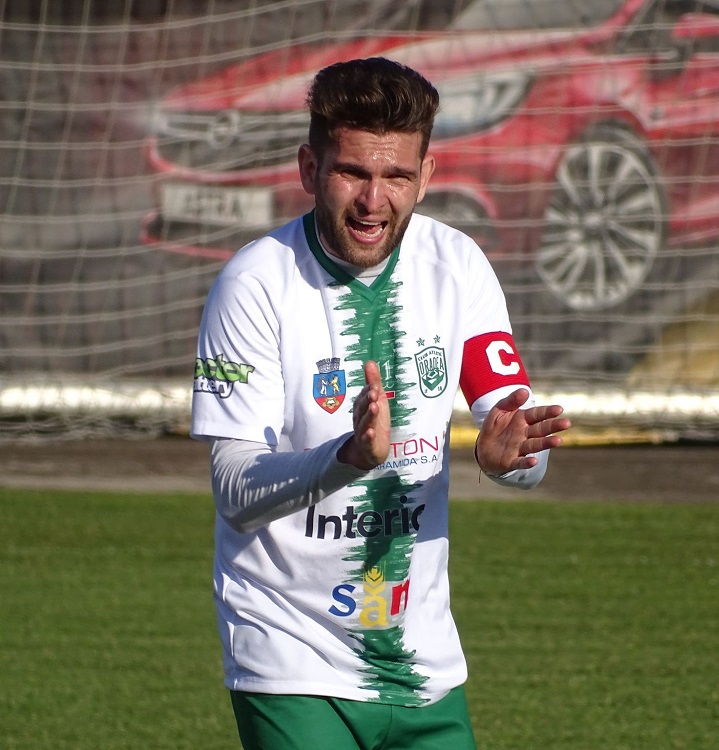
- Codoban playing for CAO (2021)

Personal information
- Date of birth: 8 April 1988 (age 38)
- Place of birth: Oradea, Romania
- Height: 1.82 m (6 ft 0 in)
- Position: Attacking midfielder

Team information
- Current team: Oșorhei
- Number: 19

Youth career
- 2000–2001: Bihor Oradea
- 2001–2006: Luceafărul Oradea

Senior career*
Years	Team	Apps	(Gls)
2006–2007	Luceafărul-Lotus Băile Felix		
2007–2008	Gloria Bistrița	4	(0)
2008–2009	Forex Brașov	6	(0)
2009–2010	Silvania Șimleu Silvaniei	12	(0)
2010–2012	Luceafărul Oradea	8	(0)
2012–2013	Buftea	12	(1)
2013–2015	Botoșani	38	(4)
2015	Brașov	16	(2)
2016	Baia Mare	16	(1)
2016	Brașov	1	(0)
2017–2018	Luceafărul Oradea	53	(10)
2018–2019	FC U Craiova	20	(1)
2020	Șoimii Lipova	10	(4)
2021	CA Oradea	8	(4)
2021–2022	Lotus Băile Felix	25	(11)
2022	→ Süderelbe (loan)	10	(6)
2023	Unirea Sântana	4	(1)
2023–2024	Diosig Bihardiószeg	24	(12)
2024–	Oșorhei	13	(3)
- * Club domestic league appearances and goals as of 15:02, 28 December 2024 (UTC)

Claudiu Codoban (born 8 April 1988) is a Romanian professional footballer who plays as an attacking midfielder for Liga IV side CS Oșorhei. In his career, Codoban also played for teams such as Luceafărul Oradea, Gloria Bistrița, FC Botoșani, FC Brașov, FCM Baia Mare, CA Oradea or FC U Craiova, among others.

== Honours ==
Luceafărul Oradea

- Liga III: 2010–11
