= Vlad Rusu =

Romanian footballer

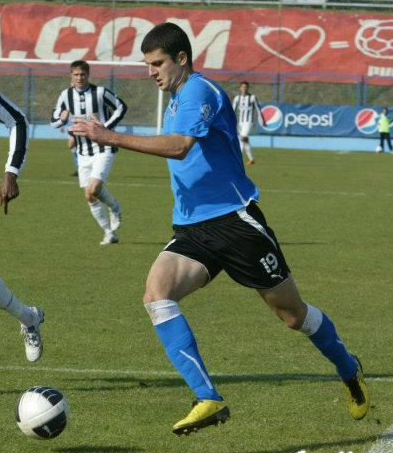

Personal information
- Date of birth: 22 June 1990 (age 36)
- Place of birth: Constanța, Romania
- Height: 1.91 m (6 ft 3 in)
- Position: Striker

Youth career
- 1997–2005: Palatul Copiilor Constanța
- 2005–2009: Steaua București

Senior career*
Years	Team	Apps	(Gls)
2008–2011	Steaua București	2	(0)
2008–2011	Steaua II București	46	(15)
2011–2014	Viitorul Constanța	45	(12)
2014	→ FC Clinceni (loan)	8	(6)
2014–2015	Academica Argeş	13	(5)
2015	Petrolul Ploiești	5	(1)
2016	Viitorul Constanța	8	(1)
2016–2017	Beerschot Wilrijk	24	(5)
2017–2018	Luceafărul Oradea	28	(26)
2018–2020	Viitorul Târgu Jiu	44	(16)
2020	Turris Turnu Măgurele	0	(0)
2021	Farul Constanța	2	(0)
2021–2022	Viitorul Târgu Jiu	5	(0)
- * Club domestic league appearances and goals as of 15:40, 23 June 2022 (UTC)

Vlad Rusu (born 22 June 1990, in Constanţa) is a Romanian former footballer who played as a striker.

== Club career ==
On 22 May 2009 Rusu played his first match in Steaua's shirt against FC Timișoara. In July 2009 was sent to the second team.

In June 2011, Rusu left Steaua II.
