= CS Luceafărul Oradea =

Romanian football club

Luceafărul Oradea
- Full name: Clubul Sportiv Luceafărul Oradea
- Nickname: Luceferii
- Short name: Luceafărul
- Founded: 2001; 25 years ago
- Ground: Luceafărul
- Capacity: 2,200
- Chairman: Lucia Vladimirescu
- League: not active at senior level
- 2022–23: Liga IV, Bihor County, 21st of 21
Home colours	Away colours	Third colours

Clubul Sportiv Luceafărul Oradea, commonly known as Luceafărul Oradea or simply as Luceafărul, is a Romanian professional football club from Oradea, Bihor County. The team currently plays in the Liga IV.

Founded in 2001, Luceafărul started as a youth academy for children who had no future at FC Bihor. The club played for the first time in Liga III in the 2006–07 season, after a merger with Lotus Băile Felix. They promoted to Liga II twice, in 2011 and 2016. Over time Luceferii has had several transformations, from the merger with Lotus to moving in Bacău and withdrawing in favor of FC Bihor, followed by a new reorganization.

== History ==
Chart of yearly table positions of Luceafărul in the national leagues since their first promotion in 2007 to the present.

=== First years and ascension (2001–2008) ===
Founded in 2001, at the initiative of several parents whose children had no future at FC Bihor, Luceafărul was grown by the former Prefect of Bihor County, Gavrilă Ghilea, also a former president of FC Bihor. For the first 5 seasons of its existence, Luceafărul have activated only at youth level, reaching the final stages of the championship at different youth groups for 3 times, but then the team from Oradea grew step by step and from the training of children they have reached a professional status in 2006 when Luceafărul merged with Lotus Băile Felix. After a first perfect season, they managed to promote to the Liga II. The miracle did not last long, because the lack of money led to the withdrawal of the team from the championship.

Luceferii started the 2007–08 season with a new head coach, Lucian Ciocan and after a new great season, Luceafărul Lotus earned the promotion to the Liga II, but subsequently they announced their withdrawal due to financial reasons. A group of businessmen from Bacău decided to form a new team to occupy the vacant spot. Thus, Știința Bacău was born after a merger.

=== Știința Bacău, a failed project (2008–2009) ===
FC Știința Bacău was probably one of the strangest football clubs in the history of the Romanian football. After Luceafărul Lotus disappeared, Știința was born, but after only a half of season, the club encountered serious financial problems. In February 2009 businessman Giani Nedelcu joined with Mircea Crainiciuc and re-founded back the club dissolved last summer, Luceafărul Lotus Băile Felix and took Știința's place in the championship. But until the end of the season, they continued to play under the name of Știința Bacău. In fact the club was a strange mix of influences from 3 different clubs, remains of Rocar București, Luceafărul Lotus and Știința Bacău. In fact, the club wanted to be a fresh alternative to the Bacău football problems, but it ended by being nothing but a team without supporters, tradition, with players transferred in the last moment and a poor management.

On 3 June 2009, Mircea Crainiciuc announced that the club withdrew from the 2008–09 Liga II championship for financial reasons. The club lost its remaining three matches by 0–3 forfeits and was relegated to Liga III.

Name	Period
Luceafărul Oradea	2001–2006
Luceafărul-Lotus Băile Felix	2006–2008
Luceafărul Oradea	2008–2011
Luceafărul Felix	2011–2013
Luceafărul Oradea	2013–present

=== Luceafărul reborn from ashes, several times (2008–present) ===
The old club was re-founded in the summer of 2008 as Luceafărul Oradea, its original name, and started from Liga IV–Bihor County, functioning in parallel with the old entity, called then Știința, for a season.

After two seasons the club promoted back to the Liga II, at the end of the 2010–11 Liga III season. A new head coach was hired in the summer of 2011, the Brașov born Călin Moldovan. On 9 December 2011 he was fired and replaced with Leontin Grozavu.

It finished 6th in the 2011–12 Liga II and 10th in the 2012–13 Liga II. In 2011, they also played a Round of 32 match in the Cupa României against Dinamo București, lost 0–1.

On 10 July 2013, it was announced that Luceafărul withdrew from the Liga II and would be enrolled in the Liga IV for the 2013–14 season. This movement has been accomplished in order to help FC Bihor, Oradea and Bihor County most important club, which was in serious financial and sporting problems at that time.

At the end of the 2014–15 Liga IV season, Luceafărul promoted back to Liga III after an impressive journey: 18 victories, 1 draw, no defeats, 177 goals scored and only 7 received. The goalscorer of the team was Constantin Roșu who scored 51 goals in 26 matches for the red and blues.

At the end of the 2015–16 Liga III season, Luceafărul promoted to Liga II, after a single Liga III season, in which they led and dominated their series almost all season.

Its first season after the promotion was an oscillating one for the red and blues. After a first part dominated by poor results and more coach changes, but with a round of 16 match played in the Cupa României against the defending Liga I champions, Astra Giurgiu, Luceafărul, with new important players in the squad like: Claudiu Codoban or Marius Matei, made a very good second part and finished on the 10th place, in the middle of the table.

2017–18 Liga II season has brought thoughts of promotion to Oradea, the owner of the club, Ioan Blidaru, desiring more than the second league and for this he set up Cornel Țălnar and Florentin Petre as coaches, and some experienced players were transferred, among them Andrei Hergheligiu, Andrei Cordoș or Petre Goge. But the start of the season was almost to kill the team from Oradea for the 4th time in its history. After four rounds Luceafărul had only one point, four rounds in which the team played three matches at home (1–1 against Sportul Snagov, 1–2 against Ripensia Timișoara and 3–4 against Dacia Unirea Brăila) and only one match away (2–3 against Târgu Mureș). But the real problem was that Sportul Snagov and Dacia Unirea Brăila were teams with organizational or financial problems, Ripensia was a new promoted and also the side with the smallest budget in the league and Târgu Mureș, despite it was a new relegated team, was threatened with bankruptcy, which was going to happen during the winter break.

The bubble broke after the match against Dacia Unirea Brăila, a match with a spectacular evolution of the score. Ioan Blidaru announced that he is withdrawing from the team and all the players and coaches are free agents, basically leading to the disbanding of the team. The news shocked the media, the supporters and all started to become truth when Luceafărul did not play at Pitești against FC Argeș. At the second default, the team would be excluded from the championship, but that another unexpected fact happened, Luceafărul and their stadium were bought through intermediaries by Nicolae Sarcină, a businessman from Gorj County, who was known for buying by the same procedure the Liga III club CS Șirineasa.

Then a very turbulent period followed, first of all there have been serious accusations that the former owner, Blidaru, have withdrawn because he suspected the players to be involved in the betting mafia, the confessions being made by the former coach Cornel Țălnar. After this scandal, Luceafărul tried to reborn, as he had done so many times, in the squad remained some local players and the new owner tried to complete the squad with players from its other controlled team, Șirineasa, also former international player, Cristian Dulca was named as the new coach. Rebuilding in the middle of the season proved to be extremely difficult and the results were left out, but the scandals have returned to the forefront. After buying CS Șirineasa, Sarcină moved the team from Șirineasa to Petroșani and the fact that he was from Gorj County not from Bihor County or even Transylvania has brought the first speculation that he plans to move the team to Târgu Jiu, Petroșani or Motru, even talking about a merger with the Liga III team or its abandonment in favor of Luceafărul and a Liga II spot, in any case, no option included Oradea and the team's stay in its hometown. However, although some rumors even had evidence, the ownership of the club has rejected any such attempt claiming that the team will remain in Oradea, it seemed like a new Știința Bacău episode might appear. After the bustle and the scandals have subsided, luceferii, despite having a small number of players, began to produce results, coming out of the relegation area before the winter break, Claudiu Codoban and Vlad Rusu, being the main weapons of the team near the Băile Felix.

After a good 2018–19 season, in which Luceafărul was ranked 8th, the ownership of the club decided to withdraw the team from the Liga II and to enroll it in the Liga III, move made in favor of ACS Energeticianul, which remained in the second division and also took the most important players and the entire technical staff of the club from Bihor County.

== Youth program ==
Born in 2001 as a substitute for FC Bihor, Luceafărul youth academy has over time given many chances to players denied by the local neighbor. Among the most important players that grew up at the team near the Băile Felix were: Claudiu Codoban, Claudiu Micovschi or Constantin Roșu.

== Grounds ==
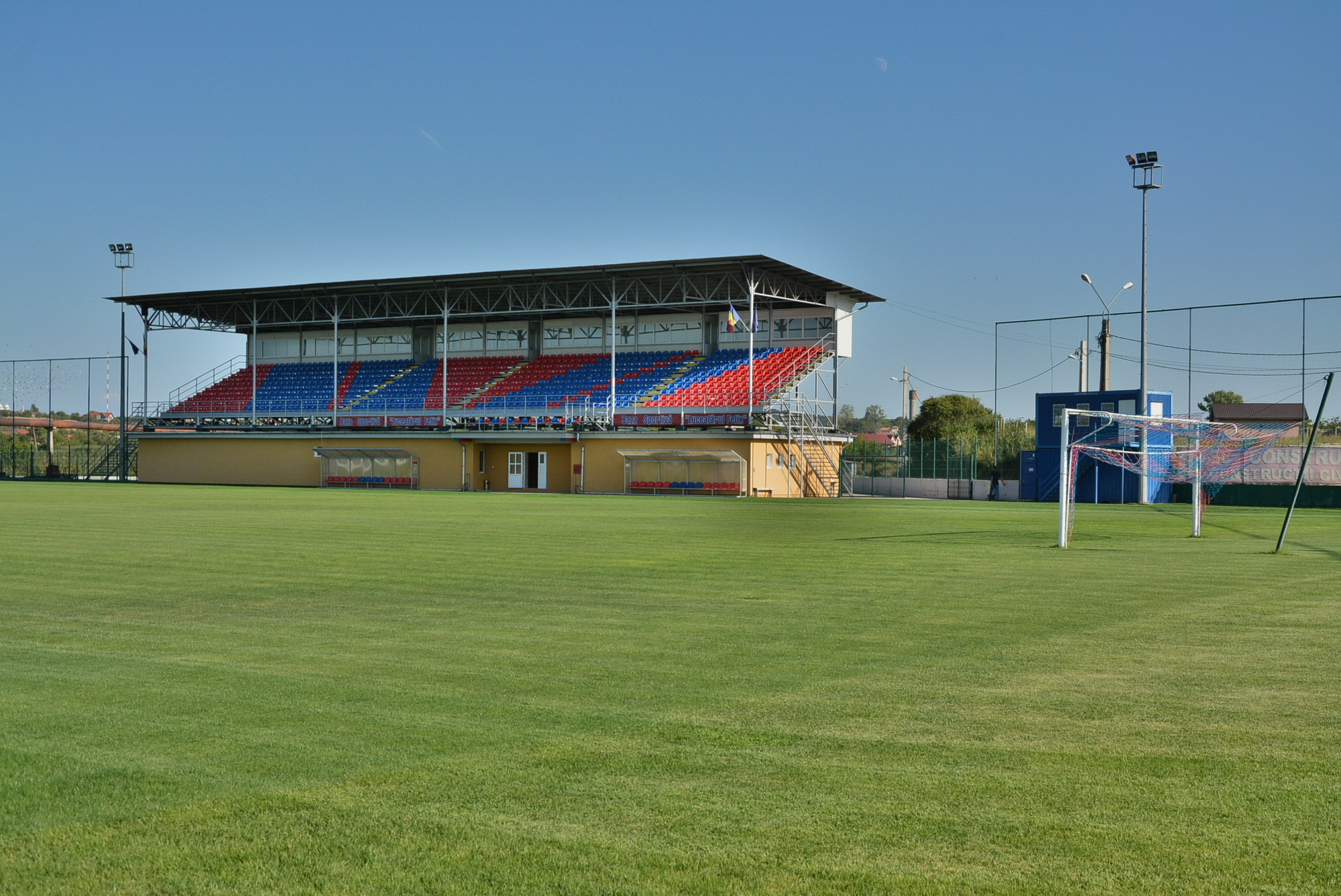
Stadionul Luceafărul

The club plays its home matches on Stadionul Luceafărul from Sânmartin, Bihor, with a capacity of 2,200 seats.

In April 2017 the club moved for its official matches from Stadionul Luceafărul to Stadionul Iuliu Bodola from Oradea a stadium with a capacity of 11,155, the biggest of Bihor County and with not so much activity after the dissolution of FC Bihor Oradea. In the summer of 2017 CA Oradea was re-founded and started to play its home matches on the same stadium, also the ownership of Luceafărul was changed and in October 2017 they decided to move the official matches back on their stadium, Stadionul Luceafărul.

== Support ==
Luceafărul Oradea has never had many supporters in Oradea, most of the public opting for much more familiar and successful FC Bihor. Over the time the club had sporadically an organized group of supporters, especially between 2011 and 2013, when the club was in the Liga II and important rivalries with FC Bihor were born. After 2016 promotion to the second league, corroborated with FC Bihor dissolution, Luceafărul tried to attract more of the supporters by its side and even played some matches on the Stadionul Iuliu Bodola, but all these efforts were not necessarily productive.

=== Rivalries ===
Luceafărul Oradea does not have many important rivalries, the only important one was born between 2011 and 2013, against FC Bihor, but the rivalry was far from being a bitter one, the two clubs working well together and Luceafărul even retired from the championship to enter into a partnership with its rival, in 2013.

== League history ==
Season	Tier	Division	Place	Notes	Cupa României
2023–25	Not active at seniors level				
2022–23	4	Liga IV (BH)	9th		First round
2021–22	3	Liga III (Seria X)	10th		First round
2020–21	3	Liga III (Seria X)	10th		Second round
2019–20	3	Liga III (Seria V)	5th		Third round
2018–19	2	Liga II	8th	Withdrew	Round of 32
2017–18	2	Liga II	8th		First round
2016–17	2	Liga II	10th		Round of 16
2015–16	3	Liga III (Seria V)	1st (C)	Promoted	
2014–15	4	Liga IV (BH)	1st (C)	Promoted	

Season	Tier	Division	Place	Notes	Cupa României
2013–14	4	Liga IV (BH)	12th		Fourth round
2012–13	2	Liga II (Seria II)	10th		Fourth round
2011–12	2	Liga II (Seria II)	6th		Third round
2010–11	3	Liga III (Seria V)	1st (C)	Promoted	Fourth round
2009–10	3	Liga III (Seria VI)	5th	Promoted	
2008–09	4	Liga IV (BH)	1st (C)	Promoted	
2007–08	3	Liga III (Seria VI)	1st (C)	Withdrew	
2006–07	3	Liga III (Seria VI)	2nd		
2005–06	4	Liga IV (BH)	7th		
2001–05	Not active at seniors level				

== Honours ==
- Liga III
  - Winners (3): 2007–08, 2010–11, 2015–16
  - Runners-up (1): 2006–07
- Liga IV – Bihor County
  - Winners (2): 2008–09, 2014–15

== Club Officials ==
=== Board of directors ===
Role	Name
President	(Romania) Lucia Vladimirescu
Vice-President	(Romania) Andrei Diaconescu
Secretary	(Romania) Ana Buzatu

=== Current technical staff ===
Role	Name
Manager	(Romania) Alin Popa

== Shirt sponsors and manufacturers ==
Period	Kit manufacturer	Period	Shirt partner
2001–2006	Joma	2001–2006	Primăria Bihor
2006–2009	(Italy) Zeus	2006–2009	(Romania) Construcții Bihor
2009–2010	(England) Mitre	2009–2010	None
2010–2011	(Spain) Joma	2010–2011	None
2011–2012	(Italy) Erreà	2011–2012	(Romania) Construcții Bihor
2012–2013	(United States) Nike	2012–2013	None
2013–2014	(Belgium) Patrick	2013–2014	None
2014–present	(Germany) Adidas	2014–present	None

== Notable former players ==
The footballers enlisted below have had international cap(s) for their respective countries at junior and/or senior level and/or more than 50 caps for CS Luceafărul Oradea.

Romania

- (Romania) Zeno Bundea
- (Romania) Cristian Cigan
- (Romania) Claudiu Codoban
- (Romania) Andrei Cordoș
- (Romania) Marius Feher
- (Romania) Alexandru Iacob
- (Romania) Andrei Hergheligiu

Burkina Faso

- (Burkina Faso) Salif Nogo

Romania

- (Romania) Claudiu Micovschi
- (Romania) Dorin Mihuț
- (Romania) Sergiu Moga
- (Romania) Cristian Oroș
- (Romania) Eduard Pap
- (Romania) Constantin Roșu

== Notable former managers ==
- (Romania) Adrian Matei (2009–2010)
- (Romania) Adrian Anca (2010)
- (Romania) Călin Moldovan (2011)
- (Romania) Leontin Grozavu (2012)
- (Romania) Călin Moldovan (2012–2013)
- (Romania) Zsolt Muzsnay (2014–2015)
- (Romania) Marius Popa (2016)
- (Romania) Erik Lincar (2016–2017)
- (Romania) Cristian Lupuț (2017)
- (Romania) Cornel Țălnar (2017)
- (Romania) Cristian Dulca (2017–2018)
- (Romania) Cristian Lupuț (2018–2019)
- (Romania) Ciprian Dianu (2020–2021)
- (Romania) Cristian Lupuț (2021)
- (Romania) Ciprian Dianu (2021)
