= Sânmartin, Bihor =

Sânmartin
- Commune
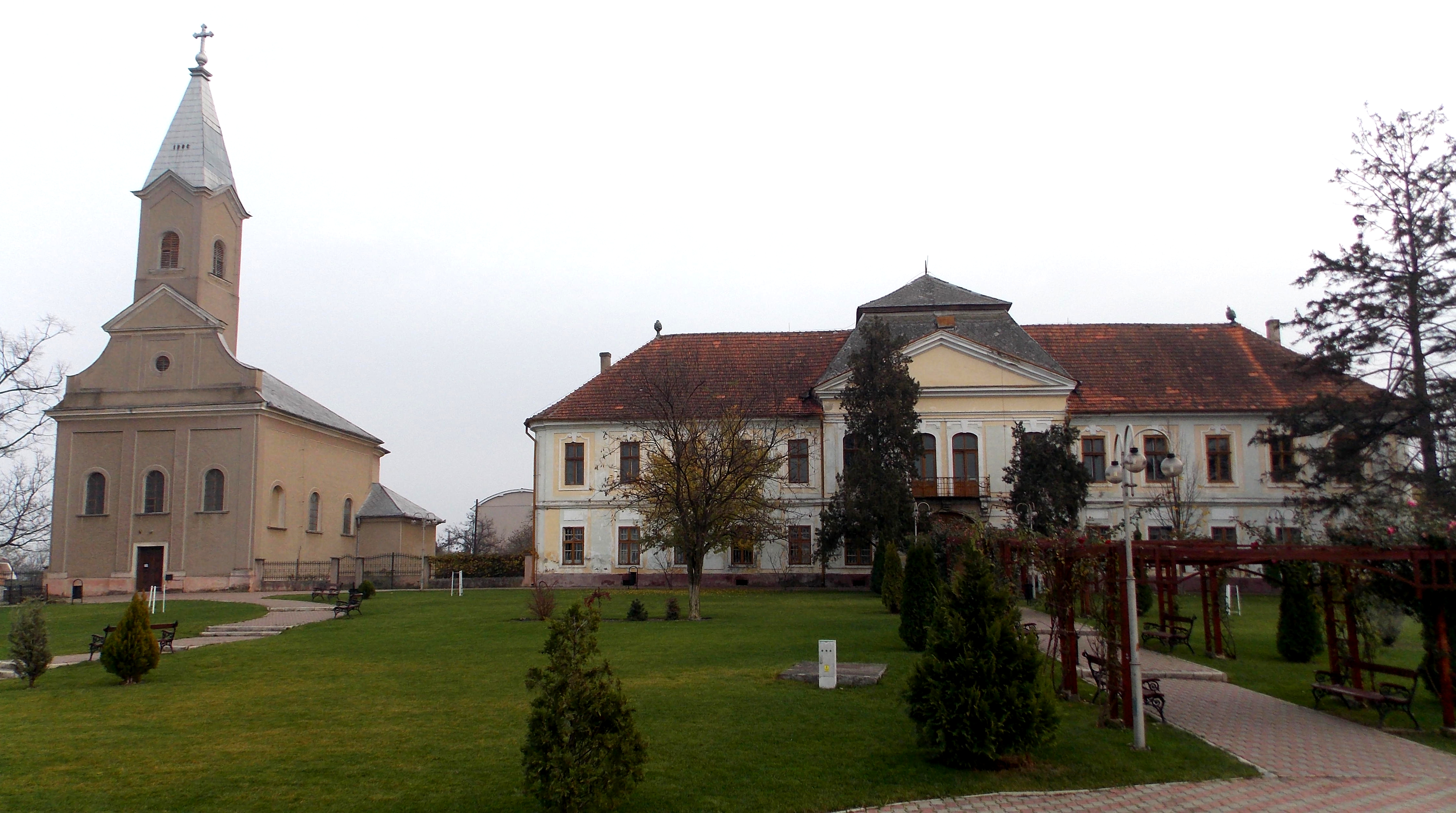
- Castle and church in Sânmartin

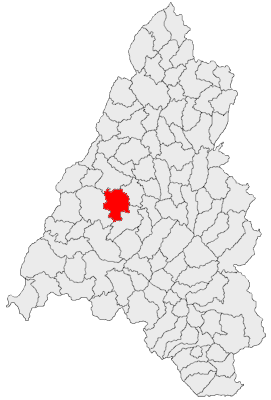
- Location in Bihor County

- Location in Romania
- Coordinates: 47.004°N 21.976°E
- Country: Romania
- County: Bihor

Government
  - Mayor (2020–2024): Cristian Laza (PSD)
- Area: 61.75 km^{2} (23.84 sq mi)
- Elevation: 155 m (509 ft)
- Population (2021-12-01): 12,448
  - Density: 201.6/km^{2} (522.1/sq mi)
- Time zone: UTC+02:00 (EET)
  - Summer (DST): UTC+03:00 (EEST)
- Postal code: 417495
- Area code: +(40) x59
- Vehicle reg.: BH
- Website: sanmartin.ro

Sânmartin (Hungarian: Váradszentmárton) is a commune in Bihor County, Crișana, Romania with a population of 12,448 people as of 2021. It is the site of two spas, Băile 1 Mai and Băile Felix.

== Villages ==
The commune is composed of six villages: Betfia (Betfia), Cihei (Váradcsehi), Cordău (Kardó), Haieu (Hájó), Rontău (Rontó), and Sânmartin.

=== Rontău ===
Rontău is a small village belonging to Sânmartin commune. The village is located close to the city of Oradea, the county seat. The village is usually considered to be part of Oradea, even though it is not a quarter or district of the urban proper, but is rather administered as part of the Sânmartin commune.

Rontău is about halfway between Oradea and Băile Felix. The village is accessible by train from Oradea and Băile Felix. It is also accessible by selected bus services from the above-mentioned places.

== Notable residents ==
- Ioan Ciordaș (1877–1919), Romanian lawyer and activist
- Zoltán Ozoray Schenker (1880–1966), Hungarian Olympic champion saber fencer
