= 2022–23 Liga II =

Liga II
- Season: 2022–23
- Champions: Politehnica Iași
- Promoted: Dinamo București; Oțelul Galați; Politehnica Iași

The 2022–23 Liga II (also known as Liga 2 Casa Pariurilor for sponsorship reasons) was the 83rd season of the Liga II, the second tier of the Romanian football league system, and the seventh consecutive season held in a single series. It began on 6 August 2022 and ended on 4 June 2023.

The competition format was maintained, consisting of two stages. In the first stage, each team played every other team once, followed by a six-team promotion play-off and a relegation play-out split into two groups of seven. In the second stage, the top two teams were promoted to Liga I, while the 3rd- and 4th-placed sides played two-legged play-offs against the 13th- and 14th-placed teams from Liga I. The bottom two teams in each group were relegated, and the 5th-placed teams met to decide the fifth relegation berth to Liga III.

== Teams ==
A total of twenty teams contested the league, including fourteen from the previous season, one relegated from Liga I, and five promoted from Liga III.

=== Team changes ===
To Liga II

Relegated from Liga I

- Dinamo București – debut.

Promoted from Liga III

- Oțelul Galați – after six years of absence.
- Progresul Spartac București – debut.
- Slatina – after one year of absence.
- Dumbrăvița – debut.
- Minaur Baia Mare – after six years of absence.

From Liga II

Promoted to Liga I

- Petrolul Ploiești – ended a four-year stay.
- Hermannstadt – ended a one-year stay.
- Universitatea Cluj – ended a four-year stay.

Relegated to Liga III

- Dunărea Călărași – ended a three-year stay.
- Dacia Unirea Brăila – ended a one-year stay.
- Astra Giurgiu – ended a one-year stay.

Other changes

- Academica Clinceni and Gaz Metan Mediaș relegated to Liga II at the end of the 2021–22 Liga I season. On 27 June 2022, Academica and Gaz Metan were relegated directly to Liga III, by the Romanian Football Federation, which denied a second tier licence for both clubs, due to important financial problems and unpaid debts to current and former players and managers.
- FC Buzău was renamed back as Gloria Buzău, due to brand rights.
- Due to Academica and Gaz Metan exclusion by the Romanian Football Federation, their places were occupied by Politehnica Timișoara and Unirea Constanța, best two ranked teams from the relegated five registered at the 2021–22 Liga II.

=== Stadiums and locations ===
Locations of the 2022–23 Liga II teams
Location of Bucharest and Ilfov teams.

Club	City	Stadium	Capacity
Concordia Chiajna	Chiajna	Concordia	5,123
CSC 1599 Șelimbăr	Șelimbăr	Municipal (Note: 1599 Șelimbăr was relocated to Municipal Stadium in Râmnicu Vâlcea, because Comunal Stadium in Șelimbăr is under renovations.)	12,000
CSC Dumbrăvița	Dumbrăvița	Ștefan Dobay	20,154
Csíkszereda Miercurea Ciuc	Miercurea Ciuc	Municipal	1,200
CSM Slatina	Slatina	1 Mai	10,000
FC Dinamo București	București	Marin Anastasovici (Note: Dinamo București was relocated to Marin Anastasovici Stadium in Giurgiu, because Dinamo Stadium in Bucharest is proposed for reconstruction.)	8,500
FC Brașov	Brașov	Silviu Ploeșteanu	8,800
Gloria Buzău	Buzău	Municipal	18,000
Metaloglobus București	Bucharest	Metaloglobus	1,000
Minaur Baia Mare	Baia Mare	Viorel Mateianu	8,000
Oțelul Galați	Galați	Oțelul	13,500
Politehnica Iași	Iași	Emil Alexandrescu	11,390
Politehnica Timișoara	Timișoara	Știința (Note: Politehnica Timișoara was relocated to Știința Stadium in Timișoara (normally its 2nd ground), because Dan Păltinișanu Stadium was closed and proposed for demolition.)	2,600
Progresul Spartac București	București	CNAF (Note: Progresul Spartac was relocated to CNAF Stadium in Buftea, because Progresul Spartac Stadium in Bucharest did not meet the standards for the second-tier.)	1,600
Ripensia Timișoara	Timișoara	Electrica	5,000
Steaua București	București	Steaua	31,254
Unirea Constanța	Constanța	Clinceni (Note: Unirea Constanța was relocated to Clinceni Stadium in Clinceni, due to an agreement to move the entire club from Constanța to Ilfov County.)	4,500
Unirea Dej	Dej	Unirea	6,000
Unirea Slobozia	Slobozia	1 Mai	6,000
Viitorul Pandurii Târgu Jiu	Târgu Jiu	Tudor Vladimirescu	12,518

=== Personnel and kits ===
Note: Flags indicate national team as has been defined under FIFA eligibility rules. Players and Managers may hold more than one non-FIFA nationality.

Team	Manager	Captain	Kit manufacturer	Shirt sponsor
1599 Șelimbăr	(Romania) Claudiu Niculescu	(Romania) Alexandru Dandea	Joma	—
Brașov	(Romania) Dan Alexa	(Croatia) Ivan Fuštar	Acerbis	—
Concordia Chiajna	(Romania) Eugen Trică	(Romania) Raul Palmeș	Joma	—
Csíkszereda Miercurea Ciuc	(Romania) Róbert Ilyés	(Romania) Attila Csürös	2Rule	Csíkszereda
Dinamo București	(Romania) Ovidiu Burcă	(Romania) Răzvan Patriche	Macron	888 Holdings
Dumbrăvița	(Romania) Cosmin Stan	(Romania) Costel Zurbagiu	Macron	Primăria Dumbrăvița
Gloria Buzău	(Romania) Adrian Mihalcea	(Romania) Relu Stoian	Beltona	Superbet
Metaloglobus București	(Romania) Eusebiu Tudor	(Romania) Daniel Lung	Jako	—
Minaur Baia Mare	(Romania) Mihai Iosif	(Romania) Ciprian Stanciu	Hummel	Primăria Baia Mare
Oțelul Galați	(Romania) Dorinel Munteanu	(Romania) Ionuț Neagu	Jako	Liberty
Politehnica Iași	(Romania) Leontin Grozavu	(Romania) Florin Plămadă	Givova	Municipiul Iași
Politehnica Timișoara	(Romania) Octavian Benga	(Romania) Denis Radu	Westiment	Unibet
Progresul Spartac București	(Romania) Andrei Erimia	(Romania) Eugen Lixandru	Nike	Kulterra
Ripensia Timișoara	(Romania) Iulian Muntean	(Romania) Gabriel Stoi	Cottontex	Almira, La Migdali, ILA
Slatina	(Romania) Daniel Oprescu	(Romania) Cătălin Doman	Macron	Primăria Slatina
Steaua București	(Romania) Daniel Oprița	(Romania) Adrian Popa	Adidas	Get's Bet
Unirea Constanța	(Romania) Dacian Nastai	(Romania) Mihai Udrea	Macron	CJ Ilfov
Unirea Dej	(Romania) Dragoș Militaru	(Romania) Florin Blaj	Hummel	Dendiarom
Unirea Slobozia	(Romania) Costel Enache	(Romania) Constantin Toma	Joma	CJ Ialomița
Viitorul Pandurii Târgu Jiu	(Romania) Călin Cojocaru	(Romania) Claudiu Dragu	Nike	Artego

=== Managerial changes ===
==== Pre-season ====
Team	Outgoing manager	Manner of departure	Date of vacancy	Incoming manager	Date of appointment
Dinamo București	(Czech Republic) Dušan Uhrin Jr.	End of contract	31 May 2022	(Romania) Ovidiu Burcă	21 July 2022
Politehnica Iași	(Romania) Costel Enache	End of contract	31 May 2022	(Romania) Claudiu Niculescu	7 June 2022
Viitorul Pandurii Târgu Jiu	(Romania) Alexandru Ciobanu	End of interim spell	31 May 2022	(Romania) Florin Stângă	5 July 2022
Unirea Slobozia	(Romania) Adrian Mihalcea	Signed by Chindia	31 May 2022	(Romania) Costel Enache	13 June 2022
Politehnica Timișoara	(Romania) Antonio Foale	End of interim spell	31 May 2022	(Romania) Bogdan Andone	21 June 2022
Brașov	(Romania) Călin Moldovan	End of contract	31 May 2022	(Romania) Dan Alexa	21 June 2022
Metaloglobus București	(Romania) Nicolae Grigore	End of contract	31 May 2022	(Romania) Eugen Trică	1 July 2022
Slatina	(Romania) Ovidiu Burcă	End of contract	30 June 2022	(Romania) Daniel Oprescu	1 July 2022
Unirea Constanța	(Romania) Leonard Strizu	End of contract	30 June 2022	(Romania) Dacian Nastai	1 July 2022

==== During the season ====
Team	Outgoing manager	Manner	Date of vacancy	Position in table		Replaced by	Date of appointment
Team	Outgoing manager	Manner	Date of vacancy	Round	Position	Replaced by	Date of appointment
Metaloglobus București	(Romania) Eugen Trică	Released	12 September 2022	6th	20th	(Romania) Florin Drăghici (interim)	13 September 2022
Metaloglobus București	(Romania) Florin Drăghici	End of interim spell	20 September 2022	7th	20th	(Romania) Eusebiu Tudor	20 September 2022
Concordia Chiajna	(Romania) Ianis Zicu	Mutual agreement	20 September 2022	7th	14th	(Romania) Eugen Trică	22 September 2022
Politehnica Timișoara	(Romania) Bogdan Andone	Released	23 September 2022	7th	18th	(Romania) Octavian Benga	27 September 2022
Gloria Buzău	(Romania) Cristian Pustai	Released	4 October 2022	8th	8th	(Romania) Adrian Mihalcea	5 October 2022
Politehnica Iași	(Romania) Claudiu Niculescu	Mutual agreement	10 October 2022	9th	5th	(Romania) Leontin Grozavu	14 October 2022
Minaur Baia Mare	(Romania) Ciprian Danciu	Released	17 October 2022	10th	16th	(Romania) Mihai Iosif	19 October 2022
1599 Șelimbăr	(Romania) Eugen Beza	Mutual agreement	4 November 2022	12th	10th	(Romania) Claudiu Niculescu	7 November 2022
Csíkszereda Miercurea Ciuc	(Romania) Francisc Dican	Released	30 November 2022	15th	6th	(Romania) Csaba László (interim) (Note: Although appointed as interim manager, Csaba László was not listed in the referees’ report, which instead named assistant coach Barna Bajkó.)	1 December 2022
Viitorul Pandurii Târgu Jiu	(Romania) Florin Stângă	Released	16 January 2023	16th	13th	(Romania) Călin Cojocaru	16 January 2023
Csíkszereda Miercurea Ciuc	(Romania) Csaba László	End of interim spell	24 January 2023	16th	7th	(Germany) Werner Burger	24 January 2023
Csíkszereda Miercurea Ciuc	(Germany) Werner Burger	Released	18 March 2023	19th	11th	(Romania) Róbert Ilyés	18 March 2023

== Regular season ==
=== League table ===
Pos	Team	Pld	W	D	L	GF	GA	GD	Pts	Promotion or relegation
1	Steaua București	19	12	4	3	37	18	+19	40	Qualification for Promotion play-off
2	Politehnica Iași	19	12	4	3	30	14	+16	40	Qualification for Promotion play-off
3	Oțelul Galați	19	10	6	3	21	12	+9	36	Qualification for Promotion play-off
4	Unirea Dej	19	8	8	3	30	25	+5	32	Qualification for Promotion play-off
5	Gloria Buzău	19	8	7	4	27	21	+6	31	Qualification for Promotion play-off
6	Dinamo București	19	9	4	6	27	18	+9	31	Qualification for Promotion play-off
7	Unirea Slobozia	19	8	7	4	30	17	+13	31	Qualification for Relegation play-out
8	Concordia Chiajna	19	9	2	8	22	17	+5	29	Qualification for Relegation play-out
9	Brașov	19	7	7	5	26	20	+6	28	Qualification for Relegation play-out
10	Slatina	19	6	9	4	18	11	+7	27	Qualification for Relegation play-out
11	Csíkszereda Miercurea Ciuc	19	7	5	7	25	18	+7	26	Qualification for Relegation play-out
12	Viitorul Pandurii Târgu Jiu	19	8	1	10	22	28	−6	25	Qualification for Relegation play-out
13	1599 Șelimbăr	19	6	6	7	19	22	−3	24	Qualification for Relegation play-out
14	Dumbrăvița	19	7	3	9	24	34	−10	24	Qualification for Relegation play-out
15	Metaloglobus București	19	6	3	10	18	22	−4	21	Qualification for Relegation play-out
16	Progresul Spartac București	19	3	8	8	17	28	−11	17	Qualification for Relegation play-out
17	Ripensia Timișoara	19	4	4	11	16	23	−7	16	Qualification for Relegation play-out
18	Minaur Baia Mare	19	3	7	9	18	29	−11	16	Qualification for Relegation play-out
19	Politehnica Timișoara	19	2	7	10	13	29	−16	13	Qualification for Relegation play-out
20	Unirea Constanța	19	4	0	15	15	49	−34	12	Qualification for Relegation play-out

Source: FRF (in Romanian)
Rules for classification: 1) Points; 2) Head-to-head points; 3) Head-to-head goal difference; 4) Head-to-head goals scored; 5)Goal difference; 6) Goals scored;

=== Results ===
Home \ Away	STE	IAȘ	OȚE	DEJ	GBZ	DIN	USZ	CON	BRA	SLA	CSI	VTJ	ȘEL	DUM	MET	PRS	RIP	MIN	PTM	UCT
Steaua București		2–1	1–0	2–0	1–1				0–1		0–4				1–1			3–0	3–1	5–0
Politehnica Iași					1–0	1–0		2–1			0–0	2–0	4–1		1–0	3–1		2–0		
Oțelul Galați		0–0			1–1			1–0	2–1		1–0	2–1			3–0			1–0	1–0	3–2
Unirea Dej		1–2	2–0		2–3			1–1	2–1		2–1				1–1			1–1	2–2	2–1
Gloria Buzău						2–1	3–1	0–1	1–1	1–1		3–1	1–0	2–1		0–0	1–0			
Dinamo București	1–2		1–3	2–3			1–0			0–0				4–1			1–0		1–1	6–0
Unirea Slobozia	2–2	0–0	1–0	1–1					2–2		0–1				1–0			3–0	0–0	3–0
Concordia Chiajna	0–1					0–1	1–0		0–1	0–3		2–0	0–1	2–2		2–0	2–1			
Brașov		2–2				0–2				0–0	1–1			4–0	1–0		1–0	1–0		5–2
Slatina	1–2	1–0	0–0	1–1			1–1				2–0						3–0		0–0	0–1
Csíkszereda Miercurea Ciuc					3–2	0–0		0–1				1–2	1–2	3–0	2–0	2–2		3–0		
Viitorul Pandurii Târgu Jiu	4–3			1–2		2–0	0–4		2–3	0–1			1–0	0–1		1–0	3–1			
1599 Șelimbăr	1–1		1–1	1–1		1–2	1–1		1–0	0–0				0–3			0–0		4–0	
Dumbrăvița	0–3	0–3	1–1	1–2			2–4			2–1							1–0		3–1	2–0
Metaloglobus București					1–3	1–2		2–1		0–1		0–0	2–0	1–0		3–0		0–1		
Progresul Spartac București	0–3		0–0	2–2		0–1	1–4		2–1	1–1			1–2	0–0			1–1			
Ripensia Timișoara	0–2	3–1	0–1	1–2			1–2				0–0				2–1				1–0	4–0
Minaur Baia Mare					1–1	1–1		0–1		2–1		1–2	3–0	3–4		2–2	1–1			
Politehnica Timișoara		1–3			1–1			2–4	0–0		2–1	0–1			1–2	0–1		1–1		1–0
Unirea Constanța		1–2			3–1			0–3			1–2	2–1	0–3		1–3	0–3		1–0		

Source: FRF
Legend: Blue = home team win; Yellow = draw; Red = away team win.

== Promotion play-off ==
A promotion play-off tournament between the best 6 teams (after 19 rounds) will be played to decide the two teams that will be promoted to Liga I, meanwhile the third-placed and fourth-placed teams would play another play-off match against the 13th-placed and 14th-placed teams from Liga I. The teams will start the promotion play-offs with all the points accumulated in the regular season.

=== Play-off table ===
Pos	Team	Pld	W	D	L	GF	GA	GD	Pts	Promotion or qualification
1	Politehnica Iași (C, P)	10	5	5	0	20	8	+12	60	Promotion to Liga I
2	Steaua București (Note: Steaua București is ineligible for promotion due to the club being owned by a governmental department/entity, all Liga I clubs are required to be privately owned.)	10	3	3	4	16	18	−2	52	
3	Oțelul Galați (P)	10	4	1	5	8	13	−5	49	Promotion to Liga I
4	Dinamo București (P)	10	4	3	3	16	12	+4	46	Qualification for play-offs
5	Gloria Buzău	10	2	5	3	9	11	−2	42	Qualification for play-offs
6	Unirea Dej	10	1	5	4	2	9	−7	40	

Source: FRF
Rules for classification: 1) Points; 2) Points in the regular season; 3) Head-to-head points; 4) Head-to-head goal difference; 5) Head-to-head goals scored; 6) Head-to-head away goals scored; 7) Goal difference (regular season + play off); 8) Goals scored (regular season + play off); 9) Play-off.
(C) Champions; (P) Promoted

=== Play-off results ===
Home \ Away	DIN	GBZ	OȚE	IAȘ	STE	DEJ
Dinamo București		1–1	3–0	1–3	3–0	0–0
Gloria Buzău	2–2		1–0	1–1	1–0	0–0
Oțelul Galați	0–2	1–0		1–2	3–2	1–0
Politehnica Iași	4–1	1–1	2–0		5–1	0–0
Steaua București	2–0	4–2	1–1	2–2		3–0
Unirea Dej	0–3	1–0	0–1	0–0	1–1	

Source: FRF
Legend: Blue = home team win; Yellow = draw; Red = away team win.

=== Positions by round ===
Team ╲ Round	19	20	21	22	23	24	25	26	27	28	29
Steaua București	1	1	2	2	1	2	2	2	2	2	2
Politehnica Iași	2	2	1	1	2	1	1	1	1	1	1
Oțelul Galați	3	3	3	3	3	3	3	3	3	3	3
Unirea Dej	4	6	6	6	6	6	6	6	5	6	6
Gloria Buzău	5	4	5	5	5	5	5	5	6	5	5
Dinamo București	6	5	4	4	4	4	4	4	4	4	4

Source: FRF

== Relegation play-out ==
A relegation play-out tournament between the last 14 ranked teams at the end of the regular season was played to decide the five teams that will be relegated to Liga III. Two play-out groups were made: the first group consisted of teams ranked 7, 10, 11, 14, 15, 18 and 19, and the second group consisted of teams ranked 8, 9, 12, 13, 16, 17 and 20, at the end of the regular season. The teams started the relegation play-out with all the points accumulated in the regular season. Two teams from each group were relegated to Liga III, while the 5th placed teams in both groups will meet in a tie to avoid relegation.

=== Group A ===
Table

Pos	Team	Pld	W	D	L	GF	GA	GD	Pts	Qualification or relegation
1	Csíkszereda Miercurea Ciuc	6	4	1	1	12	6	+6	39	
2	1599 Șelimbăr	6	4	0	2	9	7	+2	36	
3	Unirea Slobozia	6	0	3	3	7	11	−4	34	
4	Slatina	6	2	1	3	2	5	−3	34	
5	Metaloglobus București (O)	6	3	2	1	12	6	+6	32	Qualification for the relegation play-offs
6	Minaur Baia Mare (R)	6	1	3	2	3	4	−1	22	Relegation to Liga III
7	Politehnica Timișoara (R)	6	2	0	4	5	11	−6	19	Relegation to Liga III

Source: FRF
Rules for classification: 1) Points; 2) Points in the regular season; 3) Head-to-head points; 4) Head-to-head goal difference; 5) Head-to-head goals scored; 6) Head-to-head away goals scored; 7) Goal difference (regular season + play out); 8) Goals scored (regular season + play out); 9) Play-off.
(O) Play-off winners; (R) Relegated

Results

Home \ Away	CSI	SEL	USZ	SLA	MET	MIN	PTM
Csíkszereda Miercurea Ciuc			3–1	2–0	2–1		
1599 Șelimbăr	1–3			2–0	1–2		
Unirea Slobozia		2–3				0–0	1–2
Slatina			0–0			1–0	1–0
Metaloglobus București			3–3	1–0		0–0	
Minaur Baia Mare	1–1	0–1					2–1
Politehnica Timișoara	2–1	0–1			0–5		

Source: FRF
Legend: Blue = home team win; Yellow = draw; Red = away team win.

=== Group B ===
Table

Pos	Team	Pld	W	D	L	GF	GA	GD	Pts	Qualification or relegation
1	Brașov	6	5	1	0	23	5	+18	44	
2	Concordia Chiajna	6	3	1	2	8	6	+2	39	
3	Dumbrăvița	6	3	0	3	12	8	+4	33	
4	Viitorul Pandurii Târgu Jiu	6	2	1	3	10	11	−1	32	
5	Progresul Spartac București (R)	6	4	0	2	15	7	+8	29	Qualification for the relegation play-offs
6	Unirea Constanța (R)	6	2	0	4	5	27	−22	18	Relegation to Liga III
7	Ripensia Timișoara (R)	6	0	1	5	2	11	−9	17	Relegation to Liga III

Source: FRF
Rules for classification: 1) Points; 2) Points in the regular season; 3) Head-to-head points; 4) Head-to-head goal difference; 5) Head-to-head goals scored; 6) Head-to-head away goals scored; 7) Goal difference (regular season + play out); 8) Goals scored (regular season + play out); 9) Play-off.
(R) Relegated

Results

Home \ Away	BRA	CON	DUM	VTJ	PRS	UCT	RIP
Brașov		2–2		3–1		9–0	
Concordia Chiajna			3–1		1–0	0–1	
Dumbrăvița	1–2			4–0			2–0
Viitorul Pandurii Târgu Jiu		1–0			0–1	7–2	
Progresul Spartac București	1–4		3–2				1–0
Unirea Constanța			0–2		0–9		2–0
Ripensia Timișoara	0–3	1–2		1–1			

Source: FRF
Legend: Blue = home team win; Yellow = draw; Red = away team win.

== Liga II play-out ==
The 5th-placed teams of the Liga II relegation play-out groups face each other in order to determine the last relegated team to Liga III.

Team 1	Agg.	Team 2	1st leg	2nd leg
Metaloglobus București	1–1 (5–3 p)	Progresul Spartac București	1–1	0–0

First leg

13 May 2023	Metaloglobus București	1–1	Progresul Spartac București	Clinceni
11:00 EEST (UTC+3)	Dragoș Huiban 45+3'	Report	Andrei Grigore 34'	Stadium: Arena Clinceni; Attendance: 150; Referee: Iulian Călin (Ștefănești)

Second leg

20 May 2023	Progresul Spartac București	0–0 (3–5 p)	Metaloglobus București	Buftea
11:00 EEST (UTC+3)		Report		Stadium: CNAF Stadium; Referee: Bogdan Dumitrache (București)

== Season statistics ==
Regular season, promotion play-off and relegation play-out overall statistics

As of 21 May 2023

=== Top scorers ===
Rank	Player	Club	Regular	Play-off	Play-out	Total
1	(Romania) Bogdan Chipirliu	Steaua București	12	5	0	17
2	(Bulgaria) Milcho Angelov	Brașov	8	0	8	16
3	(Romania) Lóránt Kovács	Csíkszereda Miercurea Ciuc	8	0	2	10
3	(Romania) Claudiu Dragu	Viitorul Târgu Jiu	7	0	3	10
5	(Romania) Dragoș Huiban	Metaloglobus București	7	0	2	9
5	(Romania) Angelo Cocian	Unirea Dej	9	0	0	9
5	(Romania) Alexandru Pop	Unirea Dej	7	3	0	9
5	(England) Shayon Harrison	Politehnica Iași	5	4	0	9
5	(France) Lamine Ghezali	Dinamo Bucuresti	3	6	0	9
10	(Romania) Cătălin Hlistei	Politehnica Iași	6	2	0	8
10	(Moldova) Alexandru Boiciuc	Gloria Buzau	6	2	0	8
10	(Hungary) Richárd Jelena	Csíkszereda Miercurea Ciuc	5	0	3	8
10	(Romania) Adi Chică-Roșă	Brașov	3	0	5	8
10	(Bulgaria) Tsvetelin Chunchukov	Steaua București	5	4	0	8

=== Hat-tricks ===
As of 21 May 2023

Player	For	Against	Result	Date	Round
(Romania) Adi Chică-Roșă	Brașov	Unirea Constanța	9–0 (H)	14 April 2023	4 (Play-out)

== See also ==
- 2022–23 Liga I
- 2022–23 Liga III
- 2022–23 Liga IV
- 2022–23 Cupa României
