= 2021–22 Liga II =

Liga II
- Season: 2021–22
- Champions: Petrolul Ploiești
- Promoted: Petrolul Ploiești; Hermannstadt; Universitatea Cluj
- Relegated: Dunărea Călărași; Dacia Unirea Brăila; Astra Giurgiu
- Matches: 262
- Goals: 693 (2.65 per match)
- Biggest home win: FC Buzău 14–0 Unirea
- Biggest away win: Călărași 0–8 Slobozia
- Highest scoring: Buzău 14–0 Unirea
- Longest winning run: 12 matches: Petrolul Ploiești
- Longest unbeaten run: 12 matches: Petrolul Ploiești; Miercurea Ciuc
- Longest winless run: 21 matches: Dacia Unirea Brăila
- Longest losing run: 17 matches: Dacia Unirea Brăila
- Highest attendance: 22,000; U Cluj 1–2 Hermannstadt (10 May 2022)
- Lowest attendance: 0 (behind closed doors)
- All statistics correct as of 15 May 2022.

The 2021–22 Liga II (also known as Liga II Casa Pariurilor for sponsorship reasons) was the 82nd season of the Liga II, the second tier of the Romanian football league system, and the sixth consecutive season held in a single series. It began on 31 July 2021 and ended on 4 June 2022.

The competition format was maintained, consisting of two stages. In the first stage, each team played every other team once, followed by a six-team promotion play-off and a relegation play-out split into two groups of seven. In the second stage, the top two teams were promoted to Liga I, while the 3rd- and 4th-placed sides played two-legged play-offs against the 13th- and 14th-placed teams from Liga I. The bottom two teams in each group were relegated, and the 5th-placed teams met to decide the fifth relegation berth to Liga III.

== Teams ==
A total of twenty teams contested the league: twelve from the previous season, three relegated from Liga I, and five promoted from Liga III.

=== Team changes ===
To Liga II

Relegated from Liga I

- Astra Giurgiu – after twelve years in the top flight.
- Politehnica Iași – after nine years in the top flight.
- Hermannstadt – after three years in the top flight.

Promoted from Liga III

- Steaua București – debut.
- Dacia Unirea Brăila – after two years of absence.
- Corona Brașov – after nine years of absence.
- 1599 Șelimbăr – debut.
- Unirea Dej – after fourteen years of absence.

From Liga II

Promoted to Liga I

- FCU 1948 Craiova – ended a one-year stay.
- Rapid București – ended a two-year stay.
- Mioveni – ended a nine-year stay.

Relegated to Liga III

- Comuna Recea – ended a one-year stay.
- Reșița – ended a two-year stay.
- Slatina – ended a one-year stay.
- Pandurii Târgu Jiu – ended a four-year stay.
- Aerostar Bacău – ended a one-year stay.

Other changes

- Turris Turnu Măgurele withdrew during the last season and were subsequently dissolved.
- Viitorul Șelimbăr was renamed CSC 1599 Șelimbăr.
- ASU Politehnica Timișoara became SSU Politehnica Timișoara and was officially recognized as the legal successor of the former FC Politehnica Timișoara.
- ACS Dacia Unirea Brăila was renamed AFC Dacia Unirea Brăila.
- SCM Gloria Buzău was renamed back as FC Buzău, in order to obtain a Liga I licence, as SCM Gloria was a public entity, while FC Buzău operates as a public private partnership, a structure that is legally eligible for a top flight licence.
- In June 2021, Gheorghe Hagi (owner of Viitorul Constanța), chairman Gheorghe Popescu and Farul Constanța owner Ciprian Marica announced in a press conference that their two clubs have merged; second division club Farul Constanța therefore took Viitorul's place in the first league from the 2021–22 Liga I season.
- On 2 July 2021, Ciprian Marica former owner and currently a shareholder of Farul Constanța announced that the second division place was sold to a new established club, Unirea Constanța, club that will play its home matches in Techirghiol.
- Corona Brașov merged and then was absorbed by FC Brașov, club that was re-established as a new entity, but with the original "FC Brașov" brand, after four years of absence.

=== Stadiums and locations ===
Location of teams in 2021–22 Liga II.
Location of Bucharest teams.

Club	City	Stadium	Capacity
Astra Giurgiu	Giurgiu	Marin Anastasovici	8,500
Concordia Chiajna	Chiajna	Concordia	5,123
Csíkszereda Miercurea Ciuc	Miercurea Ciuc	Municipal	1,200
CSC 1599 Șelimbăr	Șelimbăr	Central (Note: 1599 Șelimbăr was relocated to the Central Stadium in Avrig, because Comunal Stadium in Șelimbăr is under renovations.)	1,000
Dacia Unirea Brăila	Brăila	Municipal	20,154
Dunărea Călărași	Călărași	Ion Comșa	10,400
FC Brașov	Brașov	Silviu Ploeșteanu	8,800
FC Buzău	Buzău	Municipal	18,000
FC Hermannstadt	Sibiu	Municipal	5,000
Metaloglobus București	Bucharest	Metaloglobus	1,000
Petrolul Ploiești	Ploiești	Ilie Oană	15,073
Politehnica Iași	Iași	Emil Alexandrescu	11,390
Politehnica Timișoara	Timișoara	Dan Păltinișanu	32,972
Ripensia Timișoara	Timișoara	Electrica	5,000
Steaua București	Bucharest	Steaua	31,254
Unirea Constanța	Constanța	Sparta	2,000
Unirea Dej	Dej	Unirea	6,000
Unirea Slobozia	Slobozia	1 Mai	6,000
Universitatea Cluj	Cluj-Napoca	Cluj Arena	30,201
Viitorul Pandurii Târgu Jiu	Târgu Jiu	Tudor Vladimirescu	12,518

=== Personnel and kits ===
Note: Flags indicate national team as has been defined under FIFA eligibility rules. Players and Managers may hold more than one non-FIFA nationality.

Team	Manager	Captain	Kit manufacturer	Shirt sponsor
1599 Șelimbăr	(Romania) Eugen Beza	(Romania) Alexandru Curtean	Joma	—
Astra Giurgiu	(Romania) George Șanțmare	(Romania) Gabriel Matei	Joma	Tinmar
Brașov	(Romania) Călin Moldovan	(Romania) Radu Leonte	Acerbis	Primăria Brașov
Buzău	(Romania) Cristian Pustai	(Romania) Ciprian Petre	Kelme	Superbet
Concordia Chiajna	(Romania) Ianis Zicu	(Romania) Andrei Marc	Joma	—
Csíkszereda Miercurea Ciuc	(Romania) Francisc Dican	(Romania) Attila Csürös	2Rule	Csíkszereda
Dacia Unirea Brăila	(Romania) Laurențiu Ivan	(Romania) Marius Moroianu	Acerbis	CJ Brăila, Al Dahra Agricultural
Dunărea Călărași	(Romania) Marius Păun	(Romania) Ionuț Țenea	Joma	Consiliul Județean Călărași
Hermannstadt	(Romania) Marius Măldărășanu	(Romania) Ionuț Stoica	Joma	—
Metaloglobus București	(Romania) Nicolae Grigore	(Romania) Ovidiu Herea	Jako	—
Petrolul Ploiești	(Romania) Nicolae Constantin	(Romania) Valentin Țicu	Joma	Veolia
Politehnica Iași	(Romania) Costel Enache	(Romania) Florin Plămadă	Givova	Municipiul Iași
Politehnica Timișoara	(Romania) Nicolae Croitoru	(Romania) Ioan Mera	Westiment	Unibet
Ripensia Timișoara	(Romania) Călin Mada	(Romania) Gabriel Stoi	Cottontex	Almira, La Migdali, ILA
Steaua București	(Romania) Daniel Oprița	(Romania) Horia Iancu	Adidas	Get's Bet, Porotherm, International Alexander Holding
Unirea Constanța	(Romania) Leonard Strizu	(Romania) Laurențiu Ardelean	Macron / Nike	—
Unirea Dej	(Romania) Dragoș Militaru	(Romania) Marius Cătinean	Joma / Hummel	—
Unirea Slobozia	(Romania) Adrian Mihalcea	(Romania) Constantin Toma	Joma	Consiliul Județean Ialomița
Universitatea Cluj	(Romania) Erik Lincar	(Romania) Costinel Gugu	Adidas	Superbet, De'Longhi, Irum
Viitorul Pandurii Târgu Jiu	(Romania) Alexandru Ciobanu	(Romania) Ciprian Rus	Nike	Artego, Hotel Brâncuși, Vitalact

=== Managerial changes ===
Team	Outgoing manager	Manner of departure	Date of vacancy	Position in table	Incoming manager	Date of appointment
Universitatea	(Romania) Costel Enache	Mutual agreement	10 May 2021	Pre-season	(Romania) Erik Lincar	11 May 2021
Petrolul	(Romania) Octavian Grigore	End of tenure as a caretaker	25 May 2021	Pre-season	(Romania) Nicolae Constantin	26 May 2021
Metaloglobus	(Romania) Gabriel Manu	End of contract	31 May 2021	Pre-season	(Romania) Nicolae Grigore	17 June 2021
Poli Iași	(Italy) Nicolò Napoli	End of contract	31 May 2021	Pre-season	(Romania) Costel Enache	20 June 2021
Poli Timișoara	(Romania) Dan Alexa	Mutual agreement	17 June 2021	Pre-season	(Romania) Dorin Toma	20 June 2021
Hermannstadt	(Romania) Eugen Beza	Mutual agreement	20 June 2021	Pre-season	(Romania) Marius Măldărășanu	21 June 2021
1599 Șelimbăr	(Romania) Florin Maxim	Resigned	24 June 2021	Pre-season	(Romania) Eugen Beza	28 June 2021
Dunărea	(Romania) Cristian Pustai	End of contract	30 June 2021	Pre-season	(Romania) Mirel Condei	1 July 2021
Buzău	(Romania) Ilie Stan	End of contract	30 June 2021	Pre-season	(Romania) Cristian Pustai	1 July 2021
Brașov	(Romania) Călin Moldovan	End of contract	30 June 2021	Pre-season	(Romania) Ilie Stan	1 July 2021
Astra	(Romania) Ionuț Badea	End of contract	30 June 2021	Pre-season	(Romania) Florin Stângă	1 July 2021
Unirea	(Romania) Ianis Zicu	Released	17 August 2021	19	(Romania) Dumitru Faitaș	18 August 2021
Dunărea	(Romania) Mirel Condei	Mutual agreement	10 September 2021	15	(Romania) Marius Milea	10 September 2021
Unirea	(Romania) Dumitru Faitaș	Mutual agreement	10 September 2021	19	(Romania) Leonard Strizu	10 September 2021
Viitorul	(Romania) Cristian Lupuț	Sacked	24 September 2021	16	(Romania) Eugen Trică	25 September 2021
Ripensia	(Romania) Cosmin Petruescu	Resigned	25 September 2021	12	(Romania) Călin Mada (caretaker)	25 September 2021
Poli Timișoara	(Romania) Dorin Toma	Mutual agreement	28 September 2021	14	(Romania) Antonio Foale (caretaker)	30 September 2021
Brașov	(Romania) Ilie Stan	Sacked	4 October 2021	15	(Romania) Andrei Șanta (caretaker)	5 October 2021
Poli Timișoara	(Romania) Antonio Foale (caretaker)	End of tenure as a caretaker	13 October 2021	13	(Romania) Nicolae Croitoru	13 October 2021
Ripensia	(Romania) Călin Mada (caretaker)	End of tenure as a caretaker	26 October 2021	10	(Romania) Florin Fabian	26 October 2021
Dunărea	(Romania) Marius Milea	Resigned	1 November 2021	18	(Romania) Vergilică Bogatu	1 November 2021
Viitorul	(Romania) Eugen Trică	Signed by FC U Craiova	9 November 2021	14	(Romania) Alexandru Ciobanu (caretaker)	11 November 2021
Dunărea	(Romania) Vergilică Bogatu	Resigned	16 November 2021	18	(Romania) Marius Păun	16 November 2021
Brașov	(Romania) Andrei Șanta (caretaker)	End of tenure as a caretaker	16 November 2021	16	(Romania) Călin Moldovan	17 November 2022
Viitorul	(Romania) Alexandru Ciobanu (caretaker)	End of tenure as a caretaker	23 November 2021	14	(Romania) Octavian Benga	23 November 2021
Dacia Unirea	(Romania) Florentin Petre	Sacked	15 December 2021	19	(Romania) Laurențiu Ivan	3 January 2022
Viitorul	(Romania) Octavian Benga	Mutual agreement	11 January 2022	15	(Romania) Eugen Trică	30 January 2022
Concordia	(Romania) Claudiu Niculescu	Sacked	1 March 2022	4	(Romania) Ianis Zicu	2 March 2022
Miercurea Ciuc	(Romania) Valentin Suciu	Sacked	14 March 2022	7	(Romania) Francisc Dican	15 March 2022
Ripensia	(Romania) Florin Fabian	Resigned	21 March 2022	12	(Romania) Călin Mada	23 March 2022
Astra	(Romania) Daniel Movilă	Resigned	15 April 2022	20	(Romania) George Șanțmare (caretaker)	15 April 2022
Viitorul	(Romania) Eugen Trică	Sacked	28 April 2022	12	(Romania) Alexandru Ciobanu (caretaker)	28 April 2022

== Regular season ==
=== League table ===
Pos	Team	Pld	W	D	L	GF	GA	GD	Pts	Promotion or relegation
1	Petrolul Ploiești	19	16	1	2	41	7	+34	49	Qualification to Promotion play-off
2	Universitatea Cluj	19	14	0	5	34	14	+20	42	Qualification to Promotion play-off
3	Hermannstadt	19	12	5	2	41	15	+26	41	Qualification to Promotion play-off
4	Steaua București	19	11	4	4	31	13	+18	37	Qualification to Promotion play-off
5	Concordia Chiajna	19	10	6	3	18	10	+8	36	Qualification to Promotion play-off
6	Unirea Slobozia	19	9	6	4	33	13	+20	33	Qualification to Promotion play-off
7	Csíkszereda Miercurea Ciuc	19	10	3	6	32	23	+9	33	Qualification to Relegation play-out
8	Buzău	19	9	5	5	43	14	+29	32	Qualification to Relegation play-out
9	Unirea Dej	19	8	4	7	17	16	+1	28	Qualification to Relegation play-out
10	Metaloglobus București	19	8	4	7	22	23	−1	28	Qualification to Relegation play-out
11	Politehnica Iași	19	7	4	8	25	21	+4	25	Qualification to Relegation play-out
12	Ripensia Timișoara	19	6	7	6	18	19	−1	25	Qualification to Relegation play-out
13	Viitorul Pandurii Târgu Jiu	19	6	6	7	16	20	−4	24	Qualification to Relegation play-out
14	1599 Șelimbăr	19	6	5	8	18	26	−8	23	Qualification to Relegation play-out
15	Politehnica Timișoara	19	6	3	10	19	27	−8	21	Qualification to Relegation play-out
16	Brașov	19	3	5	11	16	32	−16	14	Qualification to Relegation play-out
17	Unirea Constanța	19	3	2	14	18	54	−36	11	Qualification to Relegation play-out
18	Dunărea Călărași	19	1	4	14	12	50	−38	7	Qualification to Relegation play-out
19	Dacia Unirea Brăila	19	0	2	17	8	55	−47	2	Qualification to Relegation play-out
20	Astra Giurgiu (Note: Astra Giurgiu were deducted 20 points for unpaid debts.)	19	5	4	10	20	30	−10	−1	Qualification to Relegation play-out

Source: FRF (in Romanian), Soccerway (in English)
Rules for classification: 1) Points; 2) Head-to-head points; 3) Head-to-head goal difference; 4) Head-to-head goals scored; 5) Head-to-head away goals scored; 6) Goal difference; 7) Goals scored; 8)Play-off.

=== Results ===
Home \ Away	PET	UCJ	HER	STE	CON	USZ	CSI	BUZ	DEJ	MET	IAȘ	RIP	VTJ	ȘEL	PTM	BRA	UCT	DUN	DUB	AST
Petrolul Ploiești		0–0		2–0	1–0		2–0	0–0			2–0	2–0		3–0				4–1	4–0	
Universitatea Cluj					4–0	2–0			3–1	2–1			1–0		3–0	1–0	1–0	3–0		1–2
Hermannstadt	1–0	0–2		0–1			4–1	2–1			2–1	2–2		3–2				6–0	6–0	
Steaua București		0–1			0–0		1–0	1–0			3–1	2–0		0–0				3–0	5–2	1–1
Concordia Chiajna			0–0			1–1			1–0	2–1			0–0		0–0	2–1	2–0	0–0		2–1
Unirea Slobozia	0–2		0–1	1–1						1–1		1–0	2–0	2–0	1–0		2–0			
Csíkszereda Miercurea Ciuc		3–1			0–3	0–0		2–3	2–0		3–1		3–1			1–1				0–1
Buzău		0–1			0–1	1–1			1–0	4–1			1–1			1–0	14–0	3–0		4–1
Unirea Dej	1–3		1–1	2–1		0–2				1–0			1–0	3–0	2–0		2–1	0–0		
Metaloglobus București	1–0		1–1	1–3			1–1					0–1		1–0	4–1		1–4		2–1	
Politehnica Iași		2–0	0–1		0–1	3–1		0–1	0–0	0–1			1–3			1–1				3–1
Ripensia Timișoara		0–3			0–1		1–2	0–0	0–0		0–0					1–1		3–3	1–0	2–1
Viitorul Pandurii Târgu Jiu	0–3		1–1	0–2						0–0		0–0		1–0	2–1		2–1		1–0	
1599 Șelimbăr		4–2			1–0		0–3	2–1			0–0	0–2				2–1		1–0	3–1	1–1
Politehnica Timișoara	0–3		1–2	2–1			1–2	1–1			0–1	1–3		1–1					2–0	
Brașov	0–4		1–2	0–1		0–6			1–0	0–2			2–2		0–1		4–2	3–1		
Unirea Constanța	2–3		0–2	0–5			1–2		1–2		0–6	0–2		1–1	0–2				2–0	
Dunărea Călărași						0–8	0–2	0–3		0–1	2–3		0–2		1–3		1–1		3–1	
Dacia Unirea Brăila		0–3			0–2	0–3	1–5	0–7	0–1		0–2					0–0				1–1
Astra Giurgiu	1–2		0–5			1–1			0–2	1–2			1–0		0–2	2–0	2–3	3–0		

Source: FRF
Legend: Blue = home team win; Yellow = draw; Red = away team win.

== Promotion play-off ==
A promotion play-off tournament between the best 6 teams (after 19 rounds) will be played to decide the two teams that will be promoted to Liga I, meanwhile the third-placed and fourth-placed teams would play another play-off match against the 13th-placed and 14th-placed teams from Liga I. The teams will start the promotion play-offs with all the points accumulated in the regular season.

=== Play-off table ===
Pos	Team	Pld	W	D	L	GF	GA	GD	Pts	Qualification
1	Petrolul Ploiești (C, P)	10	3	5	2	9	7	+2	63	Promotion Liga I
2	Hermannstadt (P)	10	5	5	0	14	5	+9	61	Promotion Liga I
3	Universitatea Cluj (O, P)	10	4	3	3	13	9	+4	57	Qualification to play-offs
4	Steaua București (Note: Steaua Bucuresti is ineligible for promotion.)	10	3	4	3	10	10	0	50	
5	Concordia Chiajna	10	2	2	6	8	17	−9	44	Qualification to play-offs
6	Unirea Slobozia	10	1	5	4	6	12	−6	41	

Source: FRF
Rules for classification: 1) Points; 2) Points in the regular season; 3) Head-to-head points; 4) Head-to-head goal difference; 5) Head-to-head goals scored; 6) Head-to-head away goals scored; 7) Goal difference (regular season + play off); 8) Goals scored (regular season + play off); 9) Play-off.
(C) Champions; (O) Play-off winners; (P) Promoted

=== Results ===
Home \ Away	PET	HER	UCJ	STE	CON	USZ
Petrolul Ploiești		0–0	0–0	0–0	2–0	3–1
Hermannstadt	1–1		0–0	0–0	2–1	2–0
Universitatea Cluj	3–1	1–2		1–0	3–1	1–2
Steaua București	2–1	1–4	0–2		3–0	2–0
Concordia Chiajna	0–1	1–3	1–0	2–2		1–0
Unirea Slobozia	0–0	0–0	2–2	0–0	1–1	

Source: FRF
Legend: Blue = home team win; Yellow = draw; Red = away team win.

=== Positions by round ===
Team ╲ Round	19	20	21	22	23	24	25	26	27	28	29
Petrolul Ploiești	1	1	1	1	1	1	1	1	1	1	1
Universitatea Cluj	2	3	3	3	3	3	2	3	3	3	3
Hermannstadt	3	2	2	2	2	2	3	2	2	2	2
Steaua București	4	4	4	4	4	4	4	4	4	4	4
Concordia Chiajna	5	5	5	5	5	5	5	5	5	5	5
Unirea Slobozia	6	6	6	6	6	6	6	6	6	6	6

Source: FRF

== Relegation play-out ==
A relegation play-out tournament between the last 14 ranked teams at the end of the regular season was played to decide the five teams that will be relegated to Liga III. Two play-out groups were made: the first group consisted of teams ranked 7, 10, 11, 14, 15, 18 and 19, and the second group consisted of teams ranked 8, 9, 12, 13, 16, 17 and 20, at the end of the regular season. The teams started the relegation play-out with all the points accumulated in the regular season. Two teams from each group were relegated to Liga III, while the 5th placed teams in both groups will meet in a tie to avoid relegation.

=== Group A ===
Pos	Team	Pld	W	D	L	GF	GA	GD	Pts	Qualification or relegation	CSI	MET	SEL	IAS	PTM	DUN	DUB
1	Csíkszereda Miercurea Ciuc	6	5	0	1	22	6	+16	48					3–0	3–0		5–0
2	Metaloglobus București	6	2	3	1	11	7	+4	37		1–3		1–1	1–1			
3	1599 Șelimbăr	6	4	2	0	17	4	+13	37		3–2			0–0			6–0
4	Politehnica Iași	6	3	2	1	7	5	+2	36						3–1	2–0	1–0
5	Politehnica Timișoara (R)	6	2	1	3	10	11	−1	28	Qualification to relegation play-offs		1–1	1–2			3–0	
6	Dunărea Călărași (R)	6	0	0	6	2	20	−18	7	Relegation to Liga III	2–6	0–3	0–5				
7	Dacia Unirea Brăila (R)	6	1	0	5	4	20	−16	5	Relegation to Liga III		1–4			2–4	1–0	

Source: FRF
Legend: Blue = home team win; Yellow = draw; Red = away team win.
Rules for classification: 1) Points; 2) Points in the regular season; 3) Head-to-head points; 4) Head-to-head goal difference; 5) Head-to-head goals scored; 6) Head-to-head away goals scored; 7) Goal difference (regular season + play out); 8) Goals scored (regular season + play out); 9) Play-off.
(R) Relegated

=== Group B ===
Pos	Team	Pld	W	D	L	GF	GA	GD	Pts	Qualification or relegation	BUZ	DEJ	VTJ	RIP	BRA	UCT	AST
1	Buzău	6	4	0	2	14	10	+4	44				0–3			4–1	5–0
2	Unirea Dej	6	5	0	1	13	4	+9	43		3–0		1–2				1–0
3	Viitorul Pandurii Târgu Jiu	6	3	1	2	15	8	+7	34					0–2	1–2	3–3	
4	Ripensia Timișoara	6	2	0	4	7	11	−4	31		0–1	1–4			0–3		
5	Brașov (Note: Brașov were deducted 2 points for failure to pay a player's formation fee.) (O)	6	4	0	2	17	8	+9	24	Qualification to relegation play-offs	3–4	0–2					6–1
6	Unirea Constanța (R)	6	2	1	3	9	14	−5	18	Relegation to Liga III		1–2		2–1	0–3		
7	Astra Giurgiu (R)	6	0	0	6	3	23	−20	−1	Relegation to Liga III			0–6	1–3		1–2	

Updated to match(es) played on 7 May 2022. Source: FRF
Legend: Blue = home team win; Yellow = draw; Red = away team win.
Rules for classification: 1) Points; 2) Points in the regular season; 3) Head-to-head points; 4) Head-to-head goal difference; 5) Head-to-head goals scored; 6) Head-to-head away goals scored; 7) Goal difference (regular season + play out); 8) Goals scored (regular season + play out); 9) Play-off.
(O) Play-off winners; (R) Relegated

== Liga II play-out ==
The 5th-placed teams of the Liga II relegation play-out groups face each other in order to determine the last relegated team to Liga III.

Team 1	Agg.	Team 2	1st leg	2nd leg
Politehnica Timișoara	1–3	Brașov	1–2	0–1

First leg

14 May 2022	Politehnica Timișoara	1–2	Brașov	Timișoara
14:00 EEST (UTC+3)	Andrei 6'	Report	Negrean 53'; Piper 67'	Stadium: Știința; Referee: George Găman (Craiova)

Second leg

21 May 2022	Brașov	1–0	Politehnica Timișoara	Brașov
12:30	Angelov 71'	Report		Stadium: Silviu Ploeșteanu; Referee: Iulian Călin (Ştefăneşti)

== Season statistics ==
Regular season, promotion play-off and relegation play-out overall statistics

As of 15 May 2022

=== Top scorers ===
Rank	Player	Club	Regular	Play-off	Play-out	Total
1	(Romania) Adi Chică-Roșă	Buzău	12	–	3	15
1	(Romania) Bogdan Chipirliu	Steaua București	11	4	–	15
1	(Mali) Sory Ibrahim Diarra	Petrolul Ploiești	11	4	–	15
2	(Romania) Valentin Buhăcianu	Hermannstadt	11	1	–	12
2	(Guinea) Sekou Camara	Politehnica Iași	9	–	3	12
2	(Hungary) Richárd Jelena	Csíkszereda Miercurea Ciuc	7	–	5	12
3	(Romania) Lóránt Kovács	Csíkszereda Miercurea Ciuc	6	–	4	10
4	(Romania) Silviu Balaure	Hermannstadt	7	1	–	8
4	(Romania) Ovidiu Herea	Metaloglobus București	6	0	2	8
4	(Cameroon) Serges Ekollo	Buzău	6	–	2	8
5	(Romania) Cristian Ciobanu	Buzău	6	–	1	7
5	(Romania) Mircea Manole	Unirea Dej	6	–	1	7
5	(Romania) Albert Hofman	Universitatea Cluj	7	–	–	7
5	(Romania) Adrian Voicu	Concordia Chiajna	4	3	–	7
5	(Ghana) Baba Alhassan	Hermannstadt	3	4	–	7
5	(Romania) Denis Golda	Ripensia Timișoara	5	–	2	7
5	(Romania) Alin Cârstocea	Buzău	5	–	2	7
5	(Romania) Claudiu Herea	Metaloglobus București	4	–	3	7

=== Hat-tricks ===
As of 15 May 2022

Player	For	Against	Result	Date	Round
(Romania) Alexandru Pop	Unirea Dej	Șelimbăr	3–0 (H)	21 August 2021	4 (Regular season)
(Romania) Adi Chică-Roșă	Buzău	Unirea Constanța	14–0 (H)	28 August 2021	5 (Regular season)
(Romania) Cristian Ciobanu	Buzău	Unirea Constanța	14–0 (H)	28 August 2021	5 (Regular season)
(Cameroon) Serges Ekollo	Buzău	Unirea Constanța	14–0 (H)	28 August 2021	5 (Regular season)
(Mali) Sory Ibrahim Diarra^{4}	Petrolul Ploiești	Dacia Unirea Brăila	4–0 (H)	28 August 2021	5 (Regular season)
(Romania) Adi Chică-Roșă^{4}	Dacia Unirea Brăila	Buzău	0–7 (A)	16 October 2021	10 (Regular season)
(Romania) Valentin Buhăcianu	Hermannstadt	Șelimbăr	3–2 (H)	23 October 2021	11 (Regular season)
(Morocco) Zakaria El Azzouzi	Brașov	Unirea Constanța	4–2 (H)	4 December 2021	16 (Regular season)
(Romania) Alexandru Core	Astra Giurgiu	Viitorul Târgu Jiu	0–6 (A)	30 April 2022	6 (Play-out)
(Bulgaria) Milcho Angelov	Brașov	Astra Giurgiu	6–1 (H)	7 May 2022	7 (Play-out)

^{4} – Player scored four goals.

== See also ==
- 2021–22 Liga I
- 2021–22 Liga III
- 2021–22 Liga IV
- 2021–22 Cupa României
