= 2023–24 Liga III =

Liga III
- Season: 2023–24
- All statistics correct as of 24 June 2023.

The 2023–24 Liga III was the 68th season of Liga III, the third tier of the Romanian football league system. The season will begin in August 2023 and is scheduled to end in June 2024.

== Team changes ==
| Promoted from 2022–23 Liga IV | Relegated from 2022–23 Liga II | Promoted to 2023–24 Liga II | Relegated to 2023–24 Liga IV |
|---|---|---|---|
| Viitorul Curița (debut); Viitorul Liteni (after 17 years of absence); CSM Vaslui (debut); Olimpia MCMXXI Satu Mare (after 10 years of absence); Crișul Sântandrei (debut); Industria Galda (after 2 years of absence); Mediaș (debut); Ciucaș Tărlungeni (debut); Socodor (debut); Peciu Nou (debut); Turceni (after 9 years of absence); Râmnicu Vâlcea (after 18 years of absence); ARO Muscelul Câmpulung (after 7 years of absence); FC U Craiova 1948 II (after 18 years of absence); Progresul Fundulea (debut); Dunărea Giurgiu (after 18 years of absence); Tricolorul Breaza (after 14 years of absence); Hamangia Baia (after 10 years of absence); Viitorul Șuțești (debut); Axiopolis Cernavodă (after 2 years of absence) | FC Brașov (debut); Ripensia Timișoara (after 6 years of absence); Minaur Baia Mare (after 1 year of absence); Politehnica Timișoara (after 7 years of absence); Unirea Constanța (debut) | Ceahlăul Piatra Neamț (ended 5-year stay); Tunari (ended 14-year stay); Alexandria (ended 7-year stay); CSM Reșița (ended 2-year stay); Corvinul Hunedoara (ended 5-year stay) | Csíkszereda II (ended 1-year stay); Dante Botoșani (ended 3-year stay); Amara (ended 1-year stay); FCSB II (ended 7-year stay); Astra Giurgiu (ended 1-year stay); Minerul Costești (ended 3-years stay); Aurul Brad (ended 2-year stay); Progresul Ezeriș (ended 3-year stay); Pobeda Stár Bišnov (ended 2-years stay); Ocna Mureș (ended 3-years stay); CFR II Cluj (ended 2-year stay); Sportul Șimleu Silvaniei (ended 3-year stay) |

=== FC Brașov saga ===
FC Brașov had comfortably avoided relegation from Liga II last season, while Progresul Spartac were relegated after losing their last chance, the play-off against Metaloglobus. However FC Brașov did not have their finances in order and the FRF had no choice but to relegate them. FC Brașov appealed the decision, including at the court in Lausanne, but ultimately lost.

On 7 August 2023, FC Brașov was definitively relegated from Liga II by the Romanian Football Federation, with Progresul Spartac being readmitted to the Liga II.

Soon after leadership decided to disband the senior team of FC Brașov with the view to eventually merge with fellow city club SR Brașov, freeing up another spot in Liga III.

=== Teams spared from relegation ===
Progresul Spartac București was spared from relegation to 2023–24 Liga III season, due to the decision to relegate FC Brașov, decision that vacanted place in the 2022–23 Liga II season.

Sănătatea Cluj, ACB Ineu, KSE Târgu Secuiesc and Vedița Colonești were spared from relegation to 2023–24 Liga IV season.

=== Withdrawn teams ===
Real Bradu, Farul II Constanța, Retezatul Hațeg, Ripensia Timișoara, Viitorul Liteni, Unirea Constanța and Academica Recea withdrew from the competition, before the start of the season. Crișul Chișineu-Criș withdrew at the time of the draw due to a political decision. Gloria Albești also withdrew last minute.

=== Renamed teams and other changes ===
Dinamo Bacău merged with Academia FC Bacău to form FC Bacău.

CSM Satu Mare was renamed as CSM Olimpia Satu Mare.

Muscelul Câmpulung Elite was renamed as AFC Câmpulung Muscel 2022

=== Last minute changes ===
With the disbanding of FC Brașov, and the last minute withdrawals of Crișul Chișineu-Criș and Gloria Albești, the FRF decided to readmit some teams and reshuffle some of the series in order to better adhere to geographic criteria. As such Dacia Unirea Braila were readmitted, even though they had relegated after the last season, also LPS HD Clinceni (formerly known as Academica Clinceni) and Oltul Curtișoara were allowed to join Liga III, even though they had lost their respective promotion playoffs from Liga IV.

== League map ==
Locations of Liga III clubs by series
Seria I Seria II Seria III Seria IV Seria V Seria VI Seria VII Seria VIII Seria IX Seria X
Locations of Liga III clubs from Bucharest and the vicinity
Seria III Seria IV

== Regular season ==
=== Seria I ===
| Pos | Team | Pld | W | D | L | GF | GA | GD | Pts | Qualification |
|---|---|---|---|---|---|---|---|---|---|---|
| 1 | Bucovina Rădăuți | 16 | 9 | 5 | 2 | 26 | 12 | +14 | 32 | Qualification to Play-Off round |
| 2 | CSM Bacău | 16 | 10 | 1 | 5 | 25 | 14 | +11 | 31 | Qualification to Play-Off round |
| 3 | Știința Miroslava | 16 | 9 | 1 | 6 | 27 | 20 | +7 | 28 | Qualification to Play-Off round |
| 4 | FC Bacău | 16 | 7 | 3 | 6 | 25 | 19 | +6 | 24 | Qualification to Play-Off round |
| 5 | CSM Vaslui | 16 | 5 | 6 | 5 | 23 | 21 | +2 | 21 | Qualification to Play-Out round |
| 6 | Șomuz Fălticeni | 16 | 5 | 5 | 6 | 23 | 26 | −3 | 20 | Qualification to Play-Out round |
| 7 | Aerostar Bacău | 16 | 4 | 3 | 9 | 15 | 22 | −7 | 15 | Qualification to Play-Out round |
| 8 | Rapid Brodoc | 16 | 4 | 2 | 10 | 16 | 32 | −16 | 14 | Qualification to Play-Out round |
| 9 | Foresta Suceava (R) | 16 | 5 | 2 | 9 | 18 | 32 | −14 | 7 (Note: Foresta Suceava deducted 10 points. Subsequently it was excluded from Liga III, lost all matches from the second part with 0–3 and relegated to the last county football competition.) | Relegation to Liga V |
| 10 | Viitorul Darabani (D) | 0 | 0 | 0 | 0 | 0 | 0 | 0 | 0 (Note: Viitorul Darabani was excluded in the first part of the season and all its results were canceled.) | Excluded |

Source: FRF (in Romanian), Soccerway
Rules for classification: 1) Points; 2) Head-to-head points; 3) Head-to-head goal difference; 4) Head-to-head goals scored;
5) Head-to-head away goals scored; 6) Goal difference; 7) Goals scored; 8) Play-off.
(D) Disqualified; (R) Relegated

=== Seria II ===
| Pos | Team | Pld | W | D | L | GF | GA | GD | Pts | Qualification |
|---|---|---|---|---|---|---|---|---|---|---|
| 1 | Metalul Buzău | 18 | 16 | 1 | 1 | 66 | 6 | +60 | 49 | Qualification to Play-Off round |
| 2 | Focșani | 18 | 14 | 0 | 4 | 58 | 16 | +42 | 42 | Qualification to Play-Off round |
| 3 | Sporting Liești | 18 | 11 | 2 | 5 | 39 | 28 | +11 | 35 | Qualification to Play-Off round |
| 4 | Unirea Braniștea | 18 | 9 | 3 | 6 | 41 | 27 | +14 | 30 | Qualification to Play-Off round |
| 5 | Râmnicu Sărat | 18 | 9 | 2 | 7 | 47 | 34 | +13 | 29 | Qualification to Play-Out round |
| 6 | Dacia Unirea Brăila | 18 | 7 | 1 | 10 | 26 | 36 | −10 | 22 | Qualification to Play-Out round |
| 7 | Hamangia Baia | 18 | 6 | 1 | 11 | 23 | 72 | −49 | 19 | Qualification to Play-Out round |
| 8 | Voința Limpeziș | 18 | 4 | 3 | 11 | 24 | 47 | −23 | 15 | Qualification to Play-Out round |
| 9 | Viitorul Ianca | 18 | 4 | 2 | 12 | 23 | 37 | −14 | 14 | Qualification to Play-Out round |
| 10 | Viitorul Șuțești | 18 | 2 | 1 | 15 | 14 | 58 | −44 | 7 | Qualification to Play-Out round |

Source: FRF (in Romanian), Soccerway
Rules for classification: 1) Points; 2) Head-to-head points; 3) Head-to-head goal difference; 4) Head-to-head goals scored;
5) Head-to-head away goals scored; 6) Goal difference; 7) Goals scored; 8) Play-off.

=== Seria III ===
| Pos | Team | Pld | W | D | L | GF | GA | GD | Pts | Qualification |
|---|---|---|---|---|---|---|---|---|---|---|
| 1 | Afumați | 18 | 14 | 3 | 1 | 51 | 16 | +35 | 45 | Qualification to Play-Off round |
| 2 | Dunărea Călărași | 18 | 13 | 2 | 3 | 43 | 22 | +21 | 41 | Qualification to Play-Off round |
| 3 | Agricola Borcea | 18 | 10 | 4 | 4 | 37 | 24 | +13 | 34 | Qualification to Play-Off round |
| 4 | Clinceni | 18 | 10 | 2 | 6 | 41 | 33 | +8 | 32 | Qualification to Play-Off round |
| 5 | Recolta Gheorghe Doja | 18 | 7 | 3 | 8 | 38 | 42 | −4 | 24 | Qualification to Play-Out round |
| 6 | Gloria Băneasa | 18 | 6 | 2 | 10 | 29 | 37 | −8 | 20 | Qualification to Play-Out round |
| 7 | Axiopolis Cernavodă | 18 | 5 | 1 | 12 | 33 | 39 | −6 | 16 | Qualification to Play-Out round |
| 8 | Înainte Modelu | 18 | 5 | 1 | 12 | 24 | 37 | −13 | 16 | Qualification to Play-Out round |
| 9 | Progresul Fundulea | 18 | 4 | 3 | 11 | 11 | 37 | −26 | 15 | Qualification to Play-Out round |
| 10 | Voluntari II | 18 | 3 | 5 | 10 | 22 | 42 | −20 | 14 | Qualification to Play-Out round |

Source: FRF (in Romanian), Soccerway
Rules for classification: 1) Points; 2) Head-to-head points; 3) Head-to-head goal difference; 4) Head-to-head goals scored;
5) Head-to-head away goals scored; 6) Goal difference; 7) Goals scored; 8) Play-off.

=== Seria IV ===
| Pos | Team | Pld | W | D | L | GF | GA | GD | Pts | Qualification |
|---|---|---|---|---|---|---|---|---|---|---|
| 1 | CS Dinamo București | 18 | 13 | 2 | 3 | 41 | 14 | +27 | 41 | Qualification to Play-Off round |
| 2 | Popești-Leordeni | 18 | 10 | 7 | 1 | 29 | 16 | +13 | 37 | Qualification to Play-Off round |
| 3 | Blejoi | 18 | 10 | 3 | 5 | 35 | 25 | +10 | 33 | Qualification to Play-Off round |
| 4 | Dunărea Giurgiu | 18 | 9 | 2 | 7 | 30 | 29 | +1 | 29 | Qualification to Play-Off round |
| 5 | Pucioasa | 18 | 7 | 4 | 7 | 24 | 27 | −3 | 25 | Qualification to Play-Out round |
| 6 | Plopeni | 18 | 5 | 6 | 7 | 21 | 21 | 0 | 21 | Qualification to Play-Out round |
| 7 | Flacăra Moreni | 18 | 6 | 3 | 9 | 26 | 32 | −6 | 21 | Qualification to Play-Out round |
| 8 | ARO Muscelul Câmpulung | 18 | 3 | 7 | 8 | 15 | 20 | −5 | 16 | Qualification to Play-Out round |
| 9 | Tricolorul Breaza | 18 | 4 | 4 | 10 | 27 | 40 | −13 | 16 | Qualification to Play-Out round |
| 10 | Păulești | 18 | 2 | 4 | 12 | 21 | 45 | −24 | 10 | Qualification to Play-Out round |

Source: FRF (in Romanian), Soccerway
Rules for classification: 1) Points; 2) Head-to-head points; 3) Head-to-head goal difference; 4) Head-to-head goals scored;
5) Head-to-head away goals scored; 6) Goal difference; 7) Goals scored; 8) Play-off.

=== Seria V ===
| Pos | Team | Pld | W | D | L | GF | GA | GD | Pts | Qualification |
|---|---|---|---|---|---|---|---|---|---|---|
| 1 | Câmpulung Muscel | 18 | 13 | 3 | 2 | 41 | 12 | +29 | 42 | Qualification to Play-Off round |
| 2 | Olimpic Zărnești | 18 | 12 | 4 | 2 | 55 | 23 | +32 | 40 | Qualification to Play-Off round |
| 3 | Olimpic Cetate Râșnov | 18 | 11 | 4 | 3 | 38 | 19 | +19 | 37 | Qualification to Play-Off round |
| 4 | Kids Tâmpa Brașov | 18 | 9 | 6 | 3 | 27 | 15 | +12 | 33 | Qualification to Play-Off round |
| 5 | Odorheiu Secuiesc | 18 | 8 | 5 | 5 | 28 | 14 | +14 | 29 | Qualification to Play-Out round |
| 6 | KSE Târgu Secuiesc | 18 | 5 | 4 | 9 | 16 | 29 | −13 | 19 | Qualification to Play-Out round |
| 7 | Sepsi OSK II | 18 | 5 | 1 | 12 | 25 | 33 | −8 | 16 | Qualification to Play-Out round |
| 8 | Viitorul Curița | 18 | 4 | 4 | 10 | 26 | 36 | −10 | 16 | Qualification to Play-Out round |
| 9 | Ciucaș Tărlungeni | 18 | 3 | 4 | 11 | 17 | 46 | −29 | 13 | Qualification to Play-Out round |
| 10 | SR Brașov | 18 | 2 | 1 | 15 | 11 | 57 | −46 | 7 | Qualification to Play-Out round |

Source: FRF (in Romanian), Soccerway
Rules for classification: 1) Points; 2) Head-to-head points; 3) Head-to-head goal difference; 4) Head-to-head goals scored;
5) Head-to-head away goals scored; 6) Goal difference; 7) Goals scored; 8) Play-off.

=== Seria VI ===
| Pos | Team | Pld | W | D | L | GF | GA | GD | Pts | Qualification |
|---|---|---|---|---|---|---|---|---|---|---|
| 1 | Cetatea Turnu Măgurele | 18 | 11 | 4 | 3 | 39 | 13 | +26 | 37 | Qualification to Play-Off round |
| 2 | Râmnicu Vâlcea | 18 | 11 | 2 | 5 | 26 | 16 | +10 | 35 | Qualification to Play-Off round |
| 3 | Vedița Colonești | 18 | 10 | 3 | 5 | 31 | 18 | +13 | 33 | Qualification to Play-Off round |
| 4 | Viitorul Dăești | 18 | 9 | 5 | 4 | 34 | 28 | +6 | 32 | Qualification to Play-Off round |
| 5 | Flacăra Horezu | 18 | 8 | 2 | 8 | 29 | 27 | +2 | 26 | Qualification to Play-Out round |
| 6 | Sporting Roșiori | 18 | 8 | 2 | 8 | 32 | 27 | +5 | 24 (Note: Sporting Roșiori were deducted 2 points and was sanctioned with a transfer ban.) | Qualification to Play-Out round |
| 7 | Unirea Bascov | 18 | 5 | 5 | 8 | 15 | 20 | −5 | 20 | Qualification to Play-Out round |
| 8 | Oltul Curtișoara | 18 | 5 | 4 | 9 | 17 | 34 | −17 | 19 | Qualification to Play-Out round |
| 9 | Petrolul Potcoava | 18 | 4 | 4 | 10 | 17 | 28 | −11 | 16 | Qualification to Play-Out round |
| 10 | Cozia Călimănești | 18 | 2 | 3 | 13 | 12 | 41 | −29 | 9 | Qualification to Play-Out round |

Source: FRF (in Romanian), Soccerway
Rules for classification: 1) Points; 2) Head-to-head points; 3) Head-to-head goal difference; 4) Head-to-head goals scored;
5) Head-to-head away goals scored; 6) Goal difference; 7) Goals scored; 8) Play-off.

=== Seria VII ===
| Pos | Team | Pld | W | D | L | GF | GA | GD | Pts | Qualification |
|---|---|---|---|---|---|---|---|---|---|---|
| 1 | Ghiroda | 18 | 12 | 4 | 2 | 53 | 21 | +32 | 40 | Qualification to Play-Off round |
| 2 | Filiași | 18 | 12 | 2 | 4 | 50 | 20 | +30 | 38 | Qualification to Play-Off round |
| 3 | Deva | 18 | 9 | 7 | 2 | 44 | 19 | +25 | 34 | Qualification to Play-Off round |
| 4 | Viitorul Șimian | 18 | 10 | 4 | 4 | 48 | 29 | +19 | 34 | Qualification to Play-Off round |
| 5 | Universitatea Craiova II | 18 | 9 | 1 | 8 | 46 | 40 | +6 | 28 | Qualification to Play-Out round |
| 6 | Gilortul Târgu Cărbunești | 18 | 8 | 1 | 9 | 34 | 43 | −9 | 25 | Qualification to Play-Out round |
| 7 | Voința Lupac | 18 | 6 | 3 | 9 | 30 | 37 | −7 | 21 | Qualification to Play-Out round |
| 8 | Jiul Petroșani | 18 | 6 | 2 | 10 | 29 | 35 | −6 | 20 | Qualification to Play-Out round |
| 9 | FCU Craiova 1948 II | 18 | 3 | 2 | 13 | 22 | 59 | −37 | 11 | Qualification to Play-Out round |
| 10 | Turceni | 18 | 1 | 2 | 15 | 16 | 69 | −53 | 5 | Qualification to Play-Out round |

Source: FRF (in Romanian), Soccerway
Rules for classification: 1) Points; 2) Head-to-head points; 3) Head-to-head goal difference; 4) Head-to-head goals scored;
5) Head-to-head away goals scored; 6) Goal difference; 7) Goals scored; 8) Play-off.

=== Seria VIII ===
| Pos | Team | Pld | W | D | L | GF | GA | GD | Pts | Qualification |
|---|---|---|---|---|---|---|---|---|---|---|
| 1 | Bihor Oradea | 18 | 14 | 4 | 0 | 51 | 12 | +39 | 46 | Qualification to Play-Off round |
| 2 | Politehnica Timișoara | 18 | 12 | 3 | 3 | 40 | 14 | +26 | 39 | Qualification to Play-Off round |
| 3 | Peciu Nou | 18 | 11 | 3 | 4 | 37 | 20 | +17 | 36 | Qualification to Play-Off round |
| 4 | Phoenix Buziaș | 18 | 9 | 5 | 4 | 35 | 26 | +9 | 32 | Qualification to Play-Off round |
| 5 | Progresul Pecica | 18 | 9 | 4 | 5 | 36 | 24 | +12 | 31 | Qualification to Play-Out round |
| 6 | Șoimii Lipova | 18 | 7 | 2 | 9 | 30 | 40 | −10 | 23 | Qualification to Play-Out round |
| 7 | Avântul Periam | 18 | 6 | 1 | 11 | 24 | 38 | −14 | 19 | Qualification to Play-Out round |
| 8 | Gloria Lunca-Teuz Cermei | 18 | 3 | 3 | 12 | 15 | 32 | −17 | 12 | Qualification to Play-Out round |
| 9 | Socodor | 18 | 3 | 2 | 13 | 16 | 45 | −29 | 11 | Qualification to Play-Out round |
| 10 | ACB Ineu | 18 | 1 | 3 | 14 | 13 | 46 | −33 | 6 | Qualification to Play-Out round |

Source: FRF (in Romanian), Soccerway
Rules for classification: 1) Points; 2) Head-to-head points; 3) Head-to-head goal difference; 4) Head-to-head goals scored;
5) Head-to-head away goals scored; 6) Goal difference; 7) Goals scored; 8) Play-off.

=== Seria IX ===
| Pos | Team | Pld | W | D | L | GF | GA | GD | Pts | Qualification |
|---|---|---|---|---|---|---|---|---|---|---|
| 1 | Gloria Bistrița-Năsăud | 18 | 12 | 4 | 2 | 36 | 14 | +22 | 40 | Qualification to Play-Off round |
| 2 | Mediaș | 18 | 10 | 4 | 4 | 22 | 12 | +10 | 34 | Qualification to Play-Off round |
| 3 | Unirea Ungheni | 18 | 10 | 3 | 5 | 32 | 17 | +15 | 33 | Qualification to Play-Off round |
| 4 | Universitatea Alba Iulia | 18 | 9 | 4 | 5 | 31 | 15 | +16 | 31 | Qualification to Play-Off round |
| 5 | Unirea Alba Iulia | 18 | 8 | 5 | 5 | 28 | 25 | +3 | 29 | Qualification to Play-Out round |
| 6 | MSE Târgu Mureș | 18 | 7 | 4 | 7 | 30 | 26 | +4 | 25 | Qualification to Play-Out round |
| 7 | Metalurgistul Cugir | 18 | 7 | 3 | 8 | 25 | 33 | −8 | 24 | Qualification to Play-Out round |
| 8 | Avântul Reghin | 18 | 3 | 6 | 9 | 20 | 27 | −7 | 15 | Qualification to Play-Out round |
| 9 | Industria Galda | 18 | 1 | 7 | 10 | 20 | 45 | −25 | 10 | Qualification to Play-Out round |
| 10 | Viitorul Cluj | 18 | 1 | 4 | 13 | 9 | 39 | −30 | 7 | Qualification to Play-Out round |

Source: FRF (in Romanian), Soccerway
Rules for classification: 1) Points; 2) Head-to-head points; 3) Head-to-head goal difference; 4) Head-to-head goals scored;
5) Head-to-head away goals scored; 6) Goal difference; 7) Goals scored; 8) Play-off.

=== Seria X ===
| Pos | Team | Pld | W | D | L | GF | GA | GD | Pts | Qualification |
|---|---|---|---|---|---|---|---|---|---|---|
| 1 | Zalău | 18 | 12 | 5 | 1 | 33 | 14 | +19 | 41 | Qualification to Play-Off round |
| 2 | Olimpia Satu Mare | 18 | 9 | 6 | 3 | 31 | 19 | +12 | 33 | Qualification to Play-Off round |
| 3 | Crișul Sântandrei | 18 | 8 | 4 | 6 | 29 | 17 | +12 | 28 | Qualification to Play-Off round |
| 4 | Sighetu Marmației | 18 | 8 | 3 | 7 | 29 | 26 | +3 | 27 | Qualification to Play-Off round |
| 5 | Lotus Băile Felix | 18 | 7 | 6 | 5 | 19 | 17 | +2 | 27 | Qualification to Play-Out round |
| 6 | Victoria Carei | 18 | 7 | 3 | 8 | 23 | 30 | −7 | 24 | Qualification to Play-Out round |
| 7 | Sănătatea Cluj | 18 | 5 | 3 | 10 | 21 | 28 | −7 | 18 | Qualification to Play-Out round |
| 8 | Minerul Ocna Dej | 18 | 3 | 8 | 7 | 20 | 24 | −4 | 17 | Qualification to Play-Out round |
| 9 | Olimpia MCMXXI Satu Mare | 18 | 4 | 5 | 9 | 22 | 39 | −17 | 17 | Qualification to Play-Out round |
| 10 | Minaur Baia Mare | 18 | 3 | 5 | 10 | 18 | 31 | −13 | 14 | Qualification to Play-Out round |

Source: FRF (in Romanian), Soccerway
Rules for classification: 1) Points; 2) Head-to-head points; 3) Head-to-head goal difference; 4) Head-to-head goals scored;
5) Head-to-head away goals scored; 6) Goal difference; 7) Goals scored; 8) Play-off.

== Play-off round ==
=== Seria I ===
| Pos | Team | Pld | W | D | L | GF | GA | GD | Pts | Qualification |
|---|---|---|---|---|---|---|---|---|---|---|
| 1 | Bucovina Rădăuți (C, Q) | 9 | 2 | 5 | 2 | 10 | 11 | −1 | 43 | Qualification to promotion play-offs |
| 2 | FC Bacău (Q) | 9 | 5 | 3 | 1 | 10 | 3 | +7 | 42 | Qualification to promotion play-offs |
| 3 | CSM Bacău | 9 | 1 | 5 | 3 | 5 | 9 | −4 | 39 | |
| 4 | Știința Miroslava | 9 | 1 | 5 | 3 | 9 | 11 | −2 | 36 | |

Source: FRF (in Romanian)
Rules for classification: 1) Points; 2) Points in the regular season; 3) Head-to-head points; 4) Head-to-head goal difference; 5) Head-to-head goals scored;
6) Head-to-head away goals scored; 7) Goal difference (regular season + play off); 8) Goals scored (regular season + play off); 9) Play-off.
(C) Champions; (Q) Qualified for the phase indicated

=== Seria II ===
| Pos | Team | Pld | W | D | L | GF | GA | GD | Pts | Qualification |
|---|---|---|---|---|---|---|---|---|---|---|
| 1 | Metalul Buzău (C, Q) | 9 | 8 | 1 | 0 | 27 | 5 | +22 | 74 | Qualification to promotion play-offs |
| 2 | Focșani (Q) | 9 | 3 | 2 | 4 | 16 | 11 | +5 | 53 | Qualification to promotion play-offs |
| 3 | Unirea Braniștea | 9 | 2 | 4 | 3 | 10 | 16 | −6 | 40 | |
| 4 | Sporting Liești | 9 | 0 | 3 | 6 | 6 | 27 | −21 | 38 | |

Source: FRF (in Romanian)
Rules for classification: 1) Points; 2) Points in the regular season; 3) Head-to-head points; 4) Head-to-head goal difference; 5) Head-to-head goals scored;
6) Head-to-head away goals scored; 7) Goal difference (regular season + play off); 8) Goals scored (regular season + play off); 9) Play-off.
(C) Champions; (Q) Qualified for the phase indicated

=== Seria III ===
| Pos | Team | Pld | W | D | L | GF | GA | GD | Pts | Qualification |
|---|---|---|---|---|---|---|---|---|---|---|
| 1 | Afumați (C, Q) | 9 | 7 | 2 | 0 | 26 | 5 | +21 | 68 | Qualification to promotion play-offs |
| 2 | Dunărea Călărași (Q) | 9 | 3 | 2 | 4 | 10 | 12 | −2 | 52 | Qualification to promotion play-offs |
| 3 | Agricola Borcea | 9 | 3 | 2 | 4 | 9 | 16 | −7 | 45 | |
| 4 | Clinceni | 9 | 1 | 2 | 6 | 12 | 24 | −12 | 37 | |

Source: FRF (in Romanian)
Rules for classification: 1) Points; 2) Points in the regular season; 3) Head-to-head points; 4) Head-to-head goal difference; 5) Head-to-head goals scored;
6) Head-to-head away goals scored; 7) Goal difference (regular season + play off); 8) Goals scored (regular season + play off); 9) Play-off.
(C) Champions; (Q) Qualified for the phase indicated

=== Seria IV ===
| Pos | Team | Pld | W | D | L | GF | GA | GD | Pts | Qualification |
|---|---|---|---|---|---|---|---|---|---|---|
| 1 | CS Dinamo București (C, Q) | 9 | 6 | 0 | 3 | 20 | 13 | +7 | 59 | Qualification to promotion play-offs |
| 2 | Popești-Leordeni (Q) | 9 | 3 | 2 | 4 | 12 | 11 | +1 | 48 | Qualification to promotion play-offs |
| 3 | Blejoi | 9 | 4 | 2 | 3 | 18 | 18 | 0 | 47 | |
| 4 | Dunărea Giurgiu | 9 | 2 | 2 | 5 | 15 | 23 | −8 | 37 | |

Source: FRF (in Romanian)
Rules for classification: 1) Points; 2) Points in the regular season; 3) Head-to-head points; 4) Head-to-head goal difference; 5) Head-to-head goals scored;
6) Head-to-head away goals scored; 7) Goal difference (regular season + play off); 8) Goals scored (regular season + play off); 9) Play-off.
(C) Champions; (Q) Qualified for the phase indicated

=== Seria V ===
| Pos | Team | Pld | W | D | L | GF | GA | GD | Pts | Qualification |
|---|---|---|---|---|---|---|---|---|---|---|
| 1 | Câmpulung Muscel (C, Q) | 9 | 7 | 0 | 2 | 17 | 10 | +7 | 63 | Qualification to promotion play-offs |
| 2 | Olimpic Zărnești (Q) | 9 | 4 | 0 | 5 | 17 | 20 | −3 | 52 | Qualification to promotion play-offs |
| 3 | Olimpic Cetate Râșnov | 9 | 4 | 0 | 5 | 16 | 13 | +3 | 49 | |
| 4 | Kids Tâmpa Brașov | 9 | 3 | 0 | 6 | 12 | 19 | −7 | 42 | |

Source: FRF (in Romanian)
Rules for classification: 1) Points; 2) Points in the regular season; 3) Head-to-head points; 4) Head-to-head goal difference; 5) Head-to-head goals scored;
6) Head-to-head away goals scored; 7) Goal difference (regular season + play off); 8) Goals scored (regular season + play off); 9) Play-off.
(C) Champions; (Q) Qualified for the phase indicated

=== Seria VI ===
| Pos | Team | Pld | W | D | L | GF | GA | GD | Pts | Qualification |
|---|---|---|---|---|---|---|---|---|---|---|
| 1 | Râmnicu Vâlcea (C, Q) | 9 | 5 | 3 | 1 | 17 | 10 | +7 | 53 | Qualification to promotion play-offs |
| 2 | Vedița Colonești (Q) | 9 | 4 | 3 | 2 | 16 | 11 | +5 | 48 | Qualification to promotion play-offs |
| 3 | Cetatea Turnu Măgurele | 9 | 2 | 3 | 4 | 9 | 13 | −4 | 46 | |
| 4 | Viitorul Dăești | 9 | 2 | 1 | 6 | 9 | 17 | −8 | 39 | |

Source: FRF (in Romanian)
Rules for classification: 1) Points; 2) Points in the regular season; 3) Head-to-head points; 4) Head-to-head goal difference; 5) Head-to-head goals scored;
6) Head-to-head away goals scored; 7) Goal difference (regular season + play off); 8) Goals scored (regular season + play off); 9) Play-off.
(C) Champions; (Q) Qualified for the phase indicated

=== Seria VII ===
| Pos | Team | Pld | W | D | L | GF | GA | GD | Pts | Qualification |
|---|---|---|---|---|---|---|---|---|---|---|
| 1 | Ghiroda (C, Q) | 9 | 5 | 3 | 1 | 25 | 16 | +9 | 58 | Qualification to promotion play-offs |
| 2 | Filiași (Q) | 9 | 3 | 1 | 5 | 13 | 21 | −8 | 48 | Qualification to promotion play-offs |
| 3 | Deva | 9 | 3 | 4 | 2 | 19 | 17 | +2 | 47 | |
| 4 | Viitorul Șimian | 9 | 2 | 2 | 5 | 17 | 20 | −3 | 42 | |

Source: FRF (in Romanian)
Rules for classification: 1) Points; 2) Points in the regular season; 3) Head-to-head points; 4) Head-to-head goal difference; 5) Head-to-head goals scored;
6) Head-to-head away goals scored; 7) Goal difference (regular season + play off); 8) Goals scored (regular season + play off); 9) Play-off.
(C) Champions; (Q) Qualified for the phase indicated

=== Seria VIII ===
| Pos | Team | Pld | W | D | L | GF | GA | GD | Pts | Qualification |
|---|---|---|---|---|---|---|---|---|---|---|
| 1 | Bihor Oradea (C, Q) | 9 | 7 | 2 | 0 | 18 | 3 | +15 | 69 | Qualification to promotion play-offs |
| 2 | Politehnica Timișoara (Q) | 9 | 4 | 3 | 2 | 14 | 10 | +4 | 54 | Qualification to promotion play-offs |
| 3 | Peciu Nou | 9 | 2 | 1 | 6 | 7 | 14 | −7 | 43 | |
| 4 | Phoenix Buziaș | 9 | 1 | 2 | 6 | 9 | 21 | −12 | 37 | |

Source: FRF (in Romanian)
Rules for classification: 1) Points; 2) Points in the regular season; 3) Head-to-head points; 4) Head-to-head goal difference; 5) Head-to-head goals scored;
6) Head-to-head away goals scored; 7) Goal difference (regular season + play off); 8) Goals scored (regular season + play off); 9) Play-off.
(C) Champions; (Q) Qualified for the phase indicated

=== Seria IX ===
| Pos | Team | Pld | W | D | L | GF | GA | GD | Pts | Qualification |
|---|---|---|---|---|---|---|---|---|---|---|
| 1 | Gloria Bistrița-Năsăud (C, Q) | 9 | 5 | 3 | 1 | 19 | 7 | +12 | 58 | Qualification to promotion play-offs |
| 2 | Unirea Ungheni | 9 | 5 | 2 | 2 | 15 | 10 | +5 | 50 | Qualification to promotion play-offs |
| 3 | Mediaș | 9 | 2 | 1 | 6 | 9 | 15 | −6 | 41 | |
| 4 | Universitatea Alba Iulia | 9 | 3 | 0 | 6 | 11 | 22 | −11 | 40 | |

Source: FRF (in Romanian)
Rules for classification: 1) Points; 2) Points in the regular season; 3) Head-to-head points; 4) Head-to-head goal difference; 5) Head-to-head goals scored;
6) Head-to-head away goals scored; 7) Goal difference (regular season + play off); 8) Goals scored (regular season + play off); 9) Play-off.
(C) Champions; (Q) Qualified for the phase indicated

=== Seria X ===
| Pos | Team | Pld | W | D | L | GF | GA | GD | Pts | Qualification |
|---|---|---|---|---|---|---|---|---|---|---|
| 1 | Zalău (C, Q) | 9 | 4 | 3 | 2 | 19 | 11 | +8 | 56 | Qualification to promotion play-offs |
| 2 | Sighetu Marmației (Q) | 9 | 5 | 2 | 2 | 14 | 14 | 0 | 44 | Qualification to promotion play-offs |
| 3 | Olimpia Satu Mare | 9 | 2 | 3 | 4 | 12 | 14 | −2 | 42 | |
| 4 | Crișul Sântandrei | 9 | 3 | 0 | 6 | 8 | 14 | −6 | 37 | |

Source: FRF (in Romanian)
Rules for classification: 1) Points; 2) Points in the regular season; 3) Head-to-head points; 4) Head-to-head goal difference; 5) Head-to-head goals scored;
6) Head-to-head away goals scored; 7) Goal difference (regular season + play off); 8) Goals scored (regular season + play off); 9) Play-off.
(C) Champions; (Q) Qualified for the phase indicated

== Play-out round ==
=== Seria I ===
| Pos | Team | Pld | W | D | L | GF | GA | GD | Pts | Qualification or relegation |
|---|---|---|---|---|---|---|---|---|---|---|
| 5 | Șomuz Fălticeni | 6 | 5 | 1 | 0 | 17 | 3 | +14 | 36 | |
| 6 | CSM Vaslui | 6 | 4 | 1 | 1 | 16 | 3 | +13 | 34 | |
| 7 | Aerostar Bacău | 6 | 2 | 0 | 4 | 9 | 8 | +1 | 21 | |
| 8 | Rapid Brodoc | 6 | 0 | 0 | 6 | 1 | 29 | −28 | 14 | |
| 9 | Foresta Suceava (Note: Foresta Suceava and Viitorul Darabani were excluded in the first part of the season and sanctioned with relegation to the last competitive category.) (R) | 0 | 0 | 0 | 0 | 0 | 0 | 0 | 7 | Relegation to Liga IV |
| 10 | Viitorul Darabani (D) | 0 | 0 | 0 | 0 | 0 | 0 | 0 | 0 | Excluded |

Updated to match(es) played on 17 May 2024. Source: FRF (in Romanian)
Rules for classification: 1) Points; 2) Points in the regular season; 3) Head-to-head points; 4) Head-to-head goal difference; 5) Head-to-head goals scored;
6) Head-to-head away goals scored; 7) Goal difference (regular season + play out); 8) Goals scored (regular season + play out); 9) Play-off.
(D) Disqualified; (R) Relegated

=== Seria II ===
| Pos | Team | Pld | W | D | L | GF | GA | GD | Pts | Qualification or relegation |
|---|---|---|---|---|---|---|---|---|---|---|
| 5 | Râmnicu Sărat | 10 | 7 | 2 | 1 | 27 | 11 | +16 | 52 | |
| 6 | Dacia Unirea Brăila | 10 | 6 | 3 | 1 | 22 | 9 | +13 | 43 | |
| 7 | Viitorul Ianca | 10 | 5 | 2 | 3 | 19 | 11 | +8 | 31 | |
| 8 | Hamangia Baia | 10 | 3 | 1 | 6 | 14 | 28 | −14 | 29 | |
| 9 | Viitorul Șuțești (R) | 10 | 3 | 2 | 5 | 15 | 21 | −6 | 18 | Relegation to Liga IV |
| 10 | Voința Limpeziș (R) | 10 | 0 | 2 | 8 | 12 | 29 | −17 | 17 | Relegation to Liga IV |

Updated to match(es) played on 18 May 2024. Source: FRF (in Romanian)
Rules for classification: 1) Points; 2) Points in the regular season; 3) Head-to-head points; 4) Head-to-head goal difference; 5) Head-to-head goals scored;
6) Head-to-head away goals scored; 7) Goal difference (regular season + play out); 8) Goals scored (regular season + play out); 9) Play-off.
(R) Relegated

=== Seria III ===
| Pos | Team | Pld | W | D | L | GF | GA | GD | Pts | Qualification or relegation |
|---|---|---|---|---|---|---|---|---|---|---|
| 5 | Recolta Gheorghe Doja | 10 | 5 | 1 | 4 | 17 | 13 | +4 | 40 | |
| 6 | Gloria Băneasa | 10 | 6 | 1 | 3 | 12 | 10 | +2 | 39 | |
| 7 | Axiopolis Cernavodă | 10 | 5 | 3 | 2 | 19 | 15 | +4 | 34 | |
| 8 | Înainte Modelu | 10 | 3 | 3 | 4 | 12 | 15 | −3 | 28 | |
| 9 | Progresul Fundulea (R) | 10 | 2 | 3 | 5 | 10 | 14 | −4 | 24 | Relegation to Liga IV |
| 10 | Voluntari II (R) | 10 | 2 | 3 | 5 | 16 | 19 | −3 | 23 | Relegation to Liga IV |

Updated to match(es) played on 18 May 2024. Source: FRF (in Romanian)
Rules for classification: 1) Points; 2) Points in the regular season; 3) Head-to-head points; 4) Head-to-head goal difference; 5) Head-to-head goals scored;
6) Head-to-head away goals scored; 7) Goal difference (regular season + play out); 8) Goals scored (regular season + play out); 9) Play-off.
(R) Relegated

=== Seria IV ===
| Pos | Team | Pld | W | D | L | GF | GA | GD | Pts | Qualification or relegation |
|---|---|---|---|---|---|---|---|---|---|---|
| 5 | Pucioasa | 10 | 4 | 3 | 3 | 14 | 12 | +2 | 40 | |
| 6 | Flacăra Moreni | 10 | 6 | 0 | 4 | 11 | 9 | +2 | 39 | |
| 7 | Plopeni | 10 | 5 | 2 | 3 | 18 | 12 | +6 | 38 | |
| 8 | ARO Muscelul Câmpulung | 10 | 6 | 1 | 3 | 16 | 10 | +6 | 35 | |
| 9 | Tricolorul Breaza (R) | 10 | 5 | 2 | 3 | 15 | 13 | +2 | 33 | Relegation to Liga IV |
| 10 | Păulești (R) | 10 | 0 | 0 | 10 | 7 | 25 | −18 | 10 | Relegation to Liga IV |

Updated to match(es) played on 18 May 2024. Source: FRF (in Romanian)
Rules for classification: 1) Points; 2) Points in the regular season; 3) Head-to-head points; 4) Head-to-head goal difference; 5) Head-to-head goals scored;
6) Head-to-head away goals scored; 7) Goal difference (regular season + play out); 8) Goals scored (regular season + play out); 9) Play-off.
(R) Relegated

=== Seria V ===
| Pos | Team | Pld | W | D | L | GF | GA | GD | Pts | Qualification or relegation |
|---|---|---|---|---|---|---|---|---|---|---|
| 5 | Odorheiu Secuiesc | 10 | 6 | 0 | 4 | 24 | 17 | +7 | 47 | |
| 6 | Viitorul Curița | 10 | 4 | 3 | 3 | 14 | 12 | +2 | 31 | |
| 7 | Sepsi OSK II | 10 | 5 | 0 | 5 | 15 | 15 | 0 | 31 | |
| 8 | KSE Târgu Secuiesc | 10 | 3 | 2 | 5 | 12 | 13 | −1 | 30 | |
| 9 | SR Brașov (R) | 10 | 5 | 3 | 2 | 20 | 14 | +6 | 25 | Relegation to Liga IV |
| 10 | Ciucaș Tărlungeni (R) | 10 | 2 | 2 | 6 | 13 | 27 | −14 | 21 | Relegation to Liga IV |

Updated to match(es) played on 13 April 2024. Source: FRF (in Romanian)
Rules for classification: 1) Points; 2) Points in the regular season; 3) Head-to-head points; 4) Head-to-head goal difference; 5) Head-to-head goals scored;
6) Head-to-head away goals scored; 7) Goal difference (regular season + play out); 8) Goals scored (regular season + play out); 9) Play-off.
(R) Relegated

=== Seria VI ===
| Pos | Team | Pld | W | D | L | GF | GA | GD | Pts | Qualification or relegation |
|---|---|---|---|---|---|---|---|---|---|---|
| 5 | Unirea Bascov | 10 | 7 | 1 | 2 | 20 | 6 | +14 | 42 | |
| 6 | Sporting Roșiori | 10 | 5 | 1 | 4 | 18 | 14 | +4 | 40 | |
| 7 | Flacăra Horezu | 10 | 4 | 1 | 5 | 15 | 16 | −1 | 39 | |
| 8 | Oltul Curtișoara | 10 | 6 | 0 | 4 | 23 | 16 | +7 | 37 | |
| 9 | Petrolul Potcoava (R) | 10 | 5 | 1 | 4 | 15 | 18 | −3 | 32 | Relegation to Liga IV |
| 10 | Cozia Călimănești (R) | 10 | 1 | 0 | 9 | 5 | 26 | −21 | 12 | Relegation to Liga IV |

Updated to match(es) played on 13 April 2024. Source: FRF (in Romanian)
Rules for classification: 1) Points; 2) Points in the regular season; 3) Head-to-head points; 4) Head-to-head goal difference; 5) Head-to-head goals scored;
6) Head-to-head away goals scored; 7) Goal difference (regular season + play out); 8) Goals scored (regular season + play out); 9) Play-off.
(R) Relegated

=== Seria VII ===
| Pos | Team | Pld | W | D | L | GF | GA | GD | Pts | Qualification or relegation |
|---|---|---|---|---|---|---|---|---|---|---|
| 5 | Universitatea Craiova II | 10 | 8 | 0 | 2 | 40 | 15 | +25 | 52 | |
| 6 | Gilortul Târgu Cărbunești | 10 | 5 | 1 | 4 | 25 | 18 | +7 | 41 | |
| 7 | Voința Lupac | 10 | 3 | 3 | 4 | 17 | 28 | −11 | 33 | |
| 8 | Jiul Petroșani | 10 | 3 | 0 | 7 | 19 | 35 | −16 | 29 | |
| 9 | Turceni (R) | 10 | 5 | 2 | 3 | 16 | 19 | −3 | 22 | Relegation to Liga IV |
| 10 | FCU Craiova 1948 II (R) | 10 | 2 | 2 | 6 | 25 | 27 | −2 | 19 | Relegation to Liga IV |

Updated to match(es) played on 13 April 2024. Source: FRF (in Romanian)
Rules for classification: 1) Points; 2) Points in the regular season; 3) Head-to-head points; 4) Head-to-head goal difference; 5) Head-to-head goals scored;
6) Head-to-head away goals scored; 7) Goal difference (regular season + play out); 8) Goals scored (regular season + play out); 9) Play-off.
(R) Relegated

=== Seria VIII ===
| Pos | Team | Pld | W | D | L | GF | GA | GD | Pts | Qualification or relegation |
|---|---|---|---|---|---|---|---|---|---|---|
| 5 | Progresul Pecica | 10 | 8 | 0 | 2 | 30 | 10 | +20 | 55 | |
| 6 | Șoimii Lipova | 10 | 4 | 3 | 3 | 12 | 14 | −2 | 38 | |
| 7 | Avântul Periam | 10 | 5 | 3 | 2 | 18 | 12 | +6 | 37 | |
| 8 | Gloria Lunca-Teuz Cermei | 10 | 2 | 4 | 4 | 14 | 16 | −2 | 22 | |
| 9 | Socodor (R) | 10 | 2 | 3 | 5 | 11 | 23 | −12 | 20 | Relegation to Liga IV |
| 10 | ACB Ineu (R) | 10 | 1 | 3 | 6 | 12 | 22 | −10 | 12 | Relegation to Liga IV |

Updated to match(es) played on 13 April 2024. Source: FRF (in Romanian)
Rules for classification: 1) Points; 2) Points in the regular season; 3) Head-to-head points; 4) Head-to-head goal difference; 5) Head-to-head goals scored;
6) Head-to-head away goals scored; 7) Goal difference (regular season + play out); 8) Goals scored (regular season + play out); 9) Play-off.
(R) Relegated

=== Seria IX ===
| Pos | Team | Pld | W | D | L | GF | GA | GD | Pts | Qualification or relegation |
|---|---|---|---|---|---|---|---|---|---|---|
| 5 | Unirea Alba Iulia | 10 | 8 | 1 | 1 | 24 | 10 | +14 | 54 | |
| 6 | MSE Târgu Mureș | 10 | 6 | 1 | 3 | 23 | 11 | +12 | 44 | |
| 7 | Metalurgistul Cugir | 10 | 4 | 3 | 3 | 19 | 21 | −2 | 39 | |
| 8 | Avântul Reghin | 10 | 3 | 3 | 4 | 19 | 18 | +1 | 27 | |
| 9 | Viitorul Cluj (R) | 10 | 3 | 0 | 7 | 11 | 22 | −11 | 16 | Relegation to Liga IV |
| 10 | Industria Galda (R) | 10 | 1 | 2 | 7 | 9 | 23 | −14 | 15 | Relegation to Liga IV |

Updated to match(es) played on 13 April 2024. Source: FRF (in Romanian)
Rules for classification: 1) Points; 2) Points in the regular season; 3) Head-to-head points; 4) Head-to-head goal difference; 5) Head-to-head goals scored;
6) Head-to-head away goals scored; 7) Goal difference (regular season + play out); 8) Goals scored (regular season + play out); 9) Play-off.
(R) Relegated

=== Seria X ===
| Pos | Team | Pld | W | D | L | GF | GA | GD | Pts | Qualification or relegation |
|---|---|---|---|---|---|---|---|---|---|---|
| 5 | Victoria Carei | 10 | 4 | 4 | 2 | 20 | 17 | +3 | 40 | |
| 6 | Lotus Băile Felix | 10 | 3 | 4 | 3 | 15 | 14 | +1 | 40 | |
| 7 | Minaur Baia Mare | 10 | 7 | 3 | 0 | 24 | 9 | +15 | 38 | |
| 8 | Olimpia MCMXXI Satu Mare | 10 | 4 | 3 | 3 | 19 | 12 | +7 | 32 | |
| 9 | Sănătatea Cluj (R) | 10 | 4 | 2 | 4 | 20 | 16 | +4 | 32 | Relegation to Liga IV |
| 10 | Minerul Ocna Dej (R) | 10 | 0 | 0 | 10 | 0 | 30 | −30 | 17 | Relegation to Liga IV |

Updated to match(es) played on 13 April 2024. Source: FRF (in Romanian)
Rules for classification: 1) Points; 2) Points in the regular season; 3) Head-to-head points; 4) Head-to-head goal difference; 5) Head-to-head goals scored;
6) Head-to-head away goals scored; 7) Goal difference (regular season + play out); 8) Goals scored (regular season + play out); 9) Play-off.
(R) Relegated

== Promotion play-offs ==
The promotion play-offs are disputed between the first two teams from each of the ten play-off round series. Only the best five teams will be promoted to 2024–25 Liga II. To determine the sixth promoted, a mini-competition will be held, in which the best four of the five teams defeated in the finals of the playoffs will participate. The mini-competition will consist of semi-finals and a final (one game on the field of the first draw), the winner of the final advancing to Liga II, which goes from 20 to 22 participants.

=== First round ===
| Team 1 | Agg. | Team 2 | 1st leg | 2nd leg |
|---|---|---|---|---|
| Focșani | 3–1 | Bucovina Rădăuți | 2–0 | 1–1 |
| FC Bacău | 2–2 (3–4 p) | Metalul Buzău | 1–0 | 1–2 (a.e.t.) |
| Popești-Leordeni | 1–4 | Afumați | 0–1 | 1–3 |
| Dunărea Călărași | 1–4 | CS Dinamo București | 1–3 | 0–1 |
| Vedița Colonești | 1–2 | Câmpulung Muscel | 0–0 | 1–2 (a.e.t.) |
| Olimpic Zărnești | 0–7 | Râmnicu Vâlcea | 0–1 | 0–6 |
| Politehnica Timișoara | 1–2 | Ghiroda | 0–2 | 1–0 |
| Filiași | 1–2 | Bihor Oradea | 1–1 | 0–1 (a.e.t.) |
| Sighetu Marmației | 1–1 (3–5 p) | Gloria Bistrița-Năsăud | 0–0 | 1–1 (a.e.t.) |
| Unirea Ungheni | 4–1 | Zalău | 3–0 | 1–1 |

=== Second round ===
| Team 1 | Agg. | Team 2 | 1st leg | 2nd leg |
|---|---|---|---|---|
| CSM Focșani | 2–3 | Metalul Buzău | 2–1 | 0–2 |
| CS Afumați | 3–0 | CS Dinamo București | 1–0 | 2–0 |
| AFC Câmpulung Muscel | 2–1 | SCM Râmnicu Vâlcea | 2–1 | 0–0 |
| CSC Ghiroda | 2–5 | Bihor Oradea | 2–2 | 0–3 |
| Gloria Bistrița-Năsăud | 3–4 | Unirea Ungheni | 2–2 | 1–2 |

=== The sixth promoted team ===
| Team 1 | Score | Team 2 |
|---|---|---|
Semi-finals
| CS Dinamo București | 3–1 | CSC Ghiroda |
| CSM Focșani | 3–2 (a.e.t) | SCM Râmnicu Vâlcea |
Final
| CSM Focșani | 2–0 | CS Dinamo București |
