= FC Brașov =

FC Brașov may refer to:

- FC Brașov (1936), the original football club named FC Brașov, founded in 1936 and dissolved in 2017 from Brașov, Romania
- FC Brașov (2021), the current football club which is legally allowed to use FC Brașov's logo, brand and football records from Brașov, Romania
- SR Brașov, a fans-owned football club from Brașov, Romania
