= Lake Techirghiol =

Lake in Northern Dobruja, Romania

Lake Terchighiol
- Limanul Techirghiol (Romanian)
- Lacul Techirghiol (Romanian)
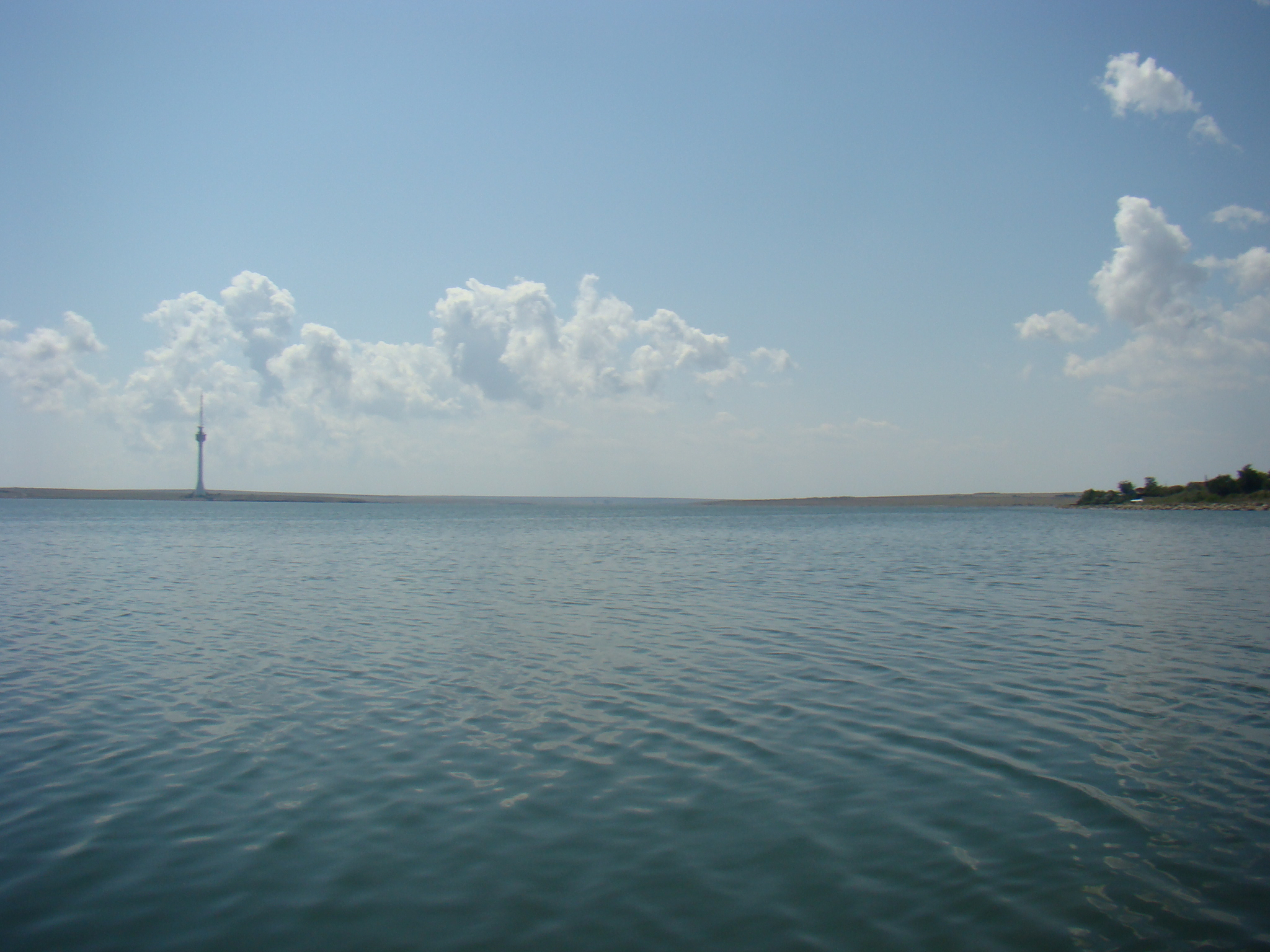
- Lake Techirghiol

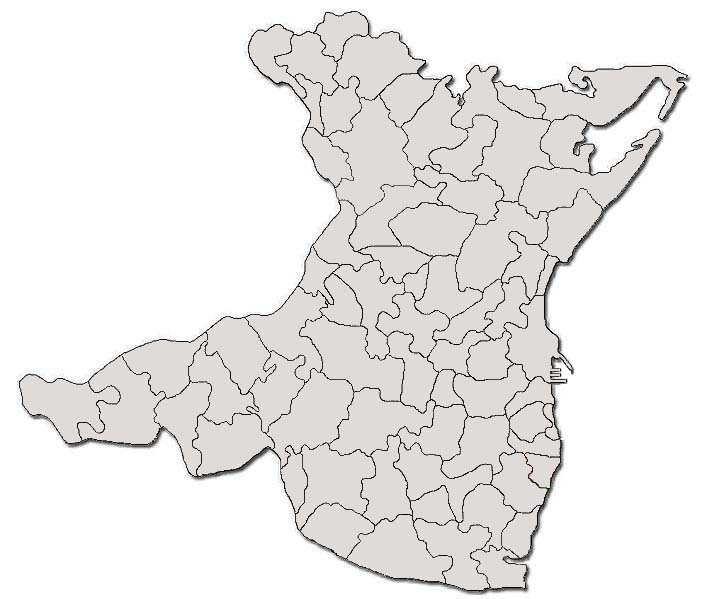
- Location within Constanţa County
- Location: Northern Dobruja
- Coordinates: 44°2′30″N 28°38′00″E
- Lake type: Brackish
- Basin countries: Romania
- Surface area: 11.6 km^{2} (4.5 sq mi)
- Max. depth: 9 m (30 ft)

Ramsar Wetland
- Designated: 23 March 2006
- Reference no.: 1610

Techirghiol (Romanian: Lacul Techirghiol or Limanul Techirghiol, i.e. Terchighiol liman) is a lake in Northern Dobruja, Romania, located by the towns of Eforie and Techirghiol, near a Ramsar site. It is separated from the Black Sea coast by a narrow strip of land on which the national road DN39 (part of European route E87) and the CFR Main Line 800 run, joining the port cities of Constanța and Mangalia.

== Etymology ==
The name of the lake comes from the Turkish Tekirgöl, meaning "Tekir's lake". The name also means (in Turkish) "Striped Lake" (tekir - striped, and göl - lake). This is because of the salinity of the lake; when the wind blows, white salt stripes appear on the surface of the lake.

== Legend of Tekir ==
The legend says that once upon a time a crippled and blind old man named Tekir, riding on the back of his donkey, reached the shore of this lake by mistake. The old man tried to get out of that smelly mud for hours on end, but his stubborn donkey didn't want to move at all, as if a mysterious force was not letting him out of the lake. It was with great wonder and joy that the old man realized, when getting out of the lake, that his eyes could see light again, and that his legs, which had stopped working a long time ago, began to obey him. As for his wise donkey — its bad wounds on the back had healed, and his body was younger than ever. When they heard of this, many people rushed to the shore of the lake, bathing and putting mud all over their bodies to be cured.

Tekir and his donkey are featured in a statue located in the center of the town of Techirghiol.
