= Adi Chică-Roșă =

Romanian footballer

Personal information
- Full name: Adi Marian Chică-Roșă
- Date of birth: 8 September 1998 (age 28)
- Place of birth: Botoșani, Romania
- Height: 1.85 m (6 ft 1 in)
- Position: Forward

Team information
- Current team: Voluntari
- Number: 29

Youth career
- –2017: Botoșani

Senior career*
Years	Team	Apps	(Gls)
2018	Viitorul Albești	9	(19)
2019	Botoșani II		
2020–2025	Botoșani	34	(7)
2020–2022	→ Gloria Buzău (loan)	41	(18)
2022–2023	→ FC Brașov (loan)	21	(8)
2023–2024	→ Gloria Buzău (loan)	25	(8)
2025–2026	Petrolul Ploiești	39	(4)
2026–	Voluntari	11	(0)
- * Club domestic league appearances and goals as of 2 November 2026

Adi Marian Chică-Roșă (born 8 September 1998) is a Romanian professional footballer who plays as a forward for Liga I club Voluntari.

== Honours ==
Individual

- Liga II top scorer: 2021–22 (joint with Bogdan Chipirliu and Sory Diarra – 15 goals)
