= Stadionul Sparta (Techirghiol) =

Multi-purpose stadium in Romania

- Interactive map of Stadionul Sparta
- Address: Str. 9 Mai
- Location: Techirghiol, Romania
- Coordinates: 44°03′05.2″N 28°35′49.5″E
- Owner: Town of Techirghiol
- Operator: Sparta Techirghiol
- Capacity: 2,000 seated
- Surface: Grass

Construction
- Opened: 1961
- Renovated: 2005–2008

Tenants
- Sparta Techirghiol (1961–present); Farul Constanța (2016–2018); Unirea Constanța (2021–2022)

Stadionul Sparta is a multi-purpose stadium in Techirghiol, Romania. It is currently used mostly for football matches and is the home ground of Sparta Techirghiol and Unirea Constanța. The stadium holds 2,000 people and was opened in 1961. Between 2005 and 2008 the stadium was renovated with an investment of 150,000€ assured by Breath Foundation and with the support of Sparta Rotterdam.
