= Bogdan Chipirliu =

Romanian professional footballer

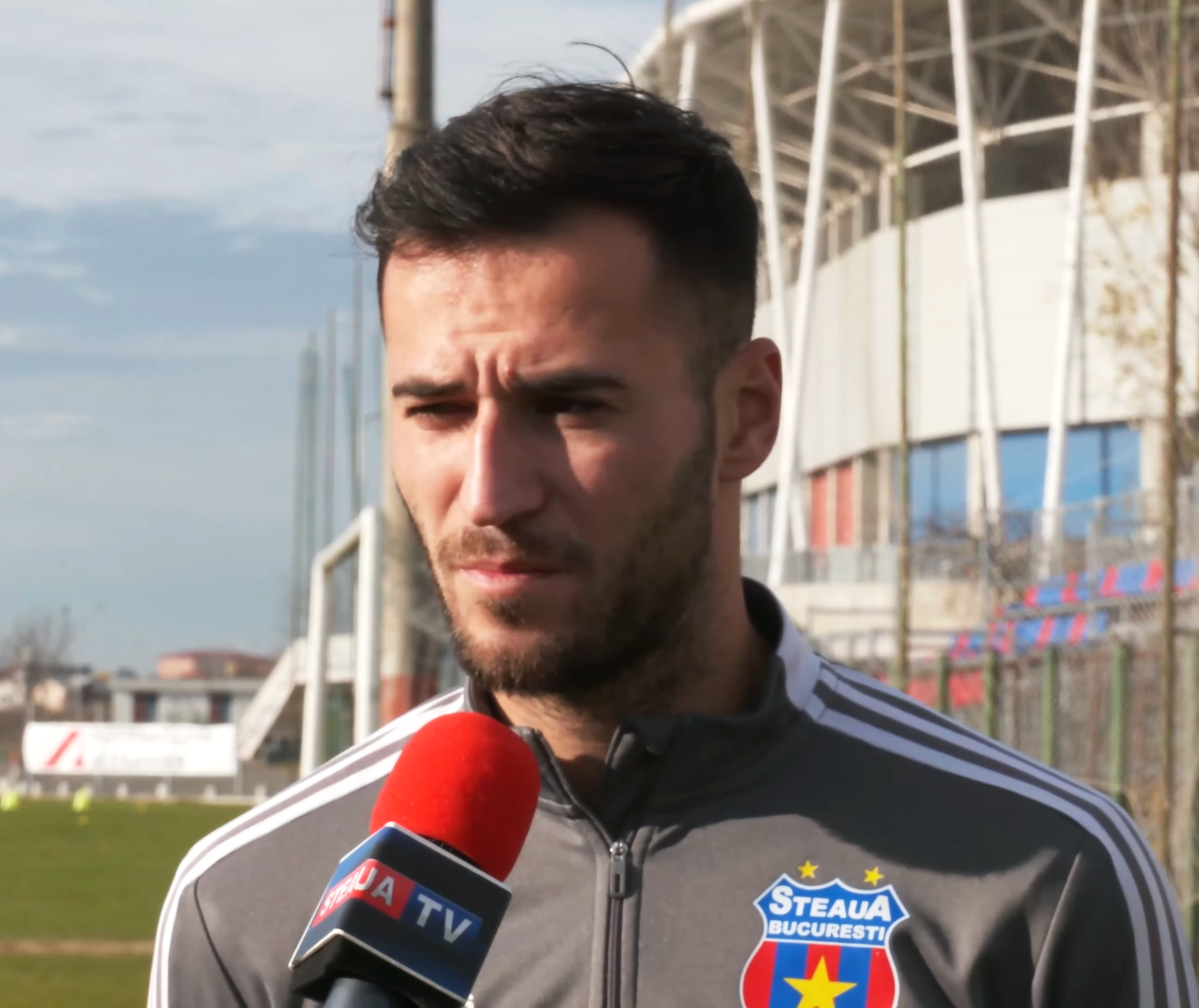
- Chipirliu with CSA Steaua București in 2021

Personal information
- Full name: Remus Bogdan Chipirliu
- Date of birth: 21 July 1992 (age 34)
- Place of birth: Galați, Romania
- Height: 1.87 m (6 ft 2 in)
- Position: Striker

Team information
- Current team: CSA Steaua București
- Number: 10

Youth career
- –2009: Oțelul Galați

Senior career*
Years	Team	Apps	(Gls)
2009–2013	Oțelul II Galați	47	(11)
2012–2016	Oțelul Galați	15	(1)
2013	→ Dunărea Galați (loan)	9	(3)
2014	→ Fortuna Poiana Câmpina (loan)	13	(4)
2015	→ ACS Poli Timişoara (loan)	0	(0)
2016–2017	Juventus București	28	(30)
2017–2018	Astra Giurgiu	5	(0)
2019–2020	Gloria Buzău	10	(3)
2020–	CSA Steaua București	153	(93)
- * Club domestic league appearances and goals as of 5 September 2026

Remus Bogdan Chipirliu (born 21 July 1992) is a Romanian professional footballer who plays as a striker for Liga II club CSA Steaua București.

== Honours ==
Fortuna Poiana Câmpina

- Liga III: 2013–14

ACS Poli Timişoara

- Liga II: 2014–15

Juventus București

- Liga II: 2016–17
- Liga III: 2015–16

Gloria Buzău

- Liga III: 2018–19

CSA Steaua București

- Liga III: 2020–21

Individuals

- Liga II top scorer: 2016–17 (30 goals), 2021–22 (joint with Adi Chică-Roșă and Sory Diarra – 15 goals), 2023–24 (joint with Marian Drăghiceanu – 14 goals), 2024–25 (15 goals)
