= Călin Ion Moldovan =

Romanian footballer and manager

Călin Moldovan
Personal information
- Full name: Călin Ion Moldovan
- Date of birth: 8 August 1967 (age 59)
- Place of birth: Brașov, Romania
- Height: 1.80 m (5 ft 11 in)
- Position: Midfielder

Team information
- Current team: CSM Focșani

Youth career
- Brașov

Senior career*
Years	Team	Apps	(Gls)
1994–1996	Brașov	38	(0)
1996–1997	Hapoel Tayibe	1	(0)
Total		38	(0)

Managerial career
- 2005–2007: Forex Brașov U19
- 2007–2008: Forex Brașov (assistant)
- 2008: Forex Brașov
- 2009: Arieșul Turda (assistant)
- 2009–2011: Forex Brașov
- 2011: Luceafărul Oradea
- 2012–2013: Luceafărul Oradea
- 2013: Corona Brașov U19
- 2013–2014: FC Zagon
- 2015: CSM Codlea
- 2015–2019: Metalurgistul Cugir
- 2019: AFC Hărman
- 2019–2021: Corona Brașov
- 2021–2022: FC Brașov
- 2022–2023: Inter Sibiu
- 2023–2024: KSE Târgu Secuiesc
- 2024: CSM Focșani
- * Club domestic league appearances and goals as of 19:37, 14 January 2024 (UTC)

Călin Ion Moldovan (born 8 August 1967) is a Romanian former professional footballer and currently a manager. As a footballer, he played in the Divizia A for his hometown club FC Brașov, during the 1990s. After retirement, Moldovan started his football manager career, leading second and third tier teams such as Forex Brașov, Luceafărul Oradea or Metalurgistul Cugir, among others.

In June 2024 he achieved one of the greatest successes of his career, when he was promoted with CSM Focșani from the Liga III to the Liga II.

== Honours ==
=== Manager ===
Corona Brașov

- Liga III: 2020–21
- Liga IV: 2019–20
