= FC Unirea Constanța =

Association football club in Romania

Unirea Constanța
- Full name: Asociația Fotbal Club; Unirea Constanța
- Nickname: Alb-albaștrii (The White and Blues)
- Short name: Unirea
- Founded: 2021
- Dissolved: 2023
- Ground: Clinceni
- Capacity: 4,500
Home colours	Away colours

Asociația Fotbal Club Unirea Constanța (Romanian pronunciation: [uˈnire̯a konˈstantsa]), commonly known as Unirea Constanța, was a Romanian professional football club.

Unirea was founded in the summer of 2021 by taking over Farul Constanța's berth in the second league; the move was approved after Farul left the spot open as a result of its merger with Liga I side Viitorul Constanța.

== History ==
Unirea Constanța was established in the summer of 2021 on the ashes of the former Farul Constanța entity, its berth in the league championship remaining unused after the merger between Farul and Viitorul Constanța. Unirea Constanța unveiled itself as "the team of the South Coast", with local businessman Altay Nuredin being the man who ensures the financing.

Unirea built its squad around former Farul players that did not enter the Liga I project, and started to play its matches in Techirghiol. It seems that the club's plan for the 2022 summer is to rename itself Marina Mangalia and subsequently move to Mangalia for its home matches, in order to be considered a successor club of Callatis Mangalia.

=== Association with FCSB (2021–2023) ===
During the first season of activity, after a series of disappointing results, the club was taken over by Vasile Geambazi, FCSB owner's nephew, and Unirea became the satellite of the Liga I team.

Mathematically relegated at the end of the season, but kept in the second tier of Romanian football due to the financial problems faced by Gaz Metan Medias and Academica Clinceni, Unirea Constanța moved to Clinceni, Ilfov County and started the rebranding process to become FCSB A Clinceni.

In the 2022–23 season, Unirea is coached by Dacian Nastai and the team's squad is almost exclusively made up of players on loan from FCSB II.

=== The fall of Unirea ===
After FCSB decided not to continue the Unirea Constanța project, the team's owner, Vasile Geambazi, announced that he wants to finish this season and that he is searching for young talents who wants to play for the rest of the season.

== Support ==
After the merger of the two teams, a group of supporters of the Farul Constanta chose to continue to support the team from the 2nd league, so the fans were divided into two camps.

== Grounds ==
Unirea Constanța played its home matches on Clinceni Stadium in Clinceni, Ilfov County, with a capacity of 4.500 seats, former home of Academica Clinceni. Formerly, Unirea played home matches in Techirghiol, Constanta County on Sparta Stadium.

== League history ==
Season	Tier	Division	Place	Cupa României
2022–23	2	Liga II	20th (R)	

Season	Tier	Division	Place	Cupa României
2021–22	2	Liga II	17th	
