= Leonard Strizu =

Romanian footballer (born 1967)

Personal information
- Full name: Leonard Mario Strizu
- Date of birth: 26 August 1967 (age 59)
- Place of birth: Timișoara, Romania
- Height: 1.72 m (5 ft 8 in)
- Positions: Forward; right winger

Senior career*
Years	Team	Apps	(Gls)
1985–1986	Rapid București	1	(0)
1986–1987	Unirea Urziceni		
1987–1990	Mecanică Fină București		
1990–1992	Sportul Studențesc București	23	(2)
1992–1993	Progresul București	27	(5)
1993–1994	Politehnica Timișoara	24	(10)
1994–1997	FC Brașov	62	(30)
1997–1998	Kayseri Erciyesspor	11	(2)
1998	Chindia Târgoviște	6	(1)
1998	FC Brașov	10	(7)
1999	Sakaryaspor	14	(6)
Total		178	(63)

Managerial career
- 2008–2010: Steaua II București
- 2010–2011: Steaua II București
- 2021–2022: Unirea Constanța
- 2022–2023: FCSB
- 2025–: Nanov
- * Club domestic league appearances and goals

Leonard Mario Strizu (born 26 August 1967) is a Romanian former professional footballer who played as a forward, who is currently in charge of Liga I club FCSB as a manager. After he retired from playing football, Strizu worked as a sports director at Steaua București, manager at Steaua București II and started his own business, a company that produces pickles. In September 2021, after ten years of inactivity, he was appointed manager at Liga II club, Unirea Constanța.

== Conviction ==
In 2005 Strizu was arrested for influence peddling. In 2007 he was sentenced to a three-year suspended sentence.

== Managerial statistics ==
As of match played 2 March 2023

Managerial record by team and tenure
Team	From	To	Record							
Team	From	To	P	W	D	L	GF	GA	GD	Win %
Steaua II București	1 July 2008	30 June 2010	64	32	18	14	96	52	+44	50.00
Steaua II București	3 November 2010	30 June 2011	21	4	5	12	20	33	−13	19.05
Unirea Constanța	4 September 2021	30 June 2022	20	5	3	12	27	47	−20	25.00
FCSB	30 November 2022	3 March 2023	13	10	1	2	26	11	+15	76.92
Total6			118	51	27	40	169	143	+26	43.22

== Honours ==
=== Player ===
Mecanică Fină București

- Divizia C: 1988–89

Politehnica Timișoara

- Divizia B: 1994–95

FC Brașov

- Divizia B: 1998–99

=== Manager ===
Steaua II București

- Liga III: 2008–09
