= Eugen Beza =

Romanian footballer (born 1978)

Personal information
- Date of birth: 1 July 1978 (age 48)
- Place of birth: Sibiu, Romania
- Height: 1.80 m (5 ft 11 in)
- Position: Midfielder

Youth career
- –1996: Inter Sibiu

Senior career*
Years	Team	Apps	(Gls)
1996–2000	Viromet Victoria		
2000	Inter Sibiu	14	(1)
2001–2002	Minaur Zlatna	24	(0)
2002–2003	Apulum Alba Iulia	5	(0)
2003–2005	FC Sibiu	27	(6)
2005–2006	Otopeni	26	(2)
2006	FCM Poiana Câmpina	15	(1)
2007–2008	Forex Brașov	47	(3)
2008–2009	SKA-Energia Khabarovsk	2	(0)
2010–2012	Voința Sibiu	74	(7)
2013–2016	Măgura Cisnădie		
2016	FC Avrig		
Total		234	(20)

Managerial career
- 2013–2016: Măgura Cisnădie (player/coach)
- 2016: FC Avrig (player/coach)
- 2016–2017: Hermannstadt (assistant)
- 2017: Hermannstadt
- 2017–2021: Hermannstadt (assistant)
- 2021: Hermannstadt
- 2021–2022: 1599 Șelimbăr
- 2023: Argeș Pitești (assistant)
- 2023: Argeș Pitești (caretaker)
- 2024–2025: SCM Râmnicu Vâlcea
- 2025–2026: 1599 Șelimbăr
- * Club domestic league appearances and goals

Eugen Beza (born 1 July 1978) is a Romanian professional football manager and former player.

== Honours ==
=== Player ===
Minaur Zlatna

- Divizia C: 2000–01

Apulum Alba Iulia

- Liga II: 2002–03

FC Sibiu

- Divizia C: 2003–04

Voința Sibiu

- Liga III: 2009–10

Măgura Cisnădie

- Liga IV – Sibiu County: 2013–14

=== Coach ===
Măgura Cisnădie

- Liga IV – Sibiu County: 2013–14

Hermannstadt

- Liga III: 2016–17

SCM Râmnicu Vâlcea

- Liga III: 2024–25
