= Francisc Dican =

Romanian footballer

Personal information
- Date of birth: 26 October 1967 (age 59)
- Place of birth: Borșa, Romania
- Height: 1.78 m (5 ft 10 in)
- Position: Midfielder

Youth career
- –1985: Maramureș Baia Mare

Senior career*
Years	Team	Apps	(Gls)
1985–1987	Maramureș Baia Mare		
1987–1988	Victoria București		
1990–1995	Universitatea Cluj	138	(27)
1995–1996	Gueugnon	19	(0)
1996–1999	Universitatea Cluj	23	(3)
1999–2001	Nyíregyháza Spartacus	40	(2)
2001	Universitatea Cluj	5	(0)
Total		225	(32)

Managerial career
- 2006: Universitatea Cluj
- 2006–2007: Universitatea Cluj (assistant)
- 2009–2010: Unirea Alba Iulia (assistant)
- 2010–2012: CFR Cluj (assistant)
- 2012: CFR Cluj (caretaker)
- 2012–2013: CFR Cluj (assistant)
- 2014: CFR Cluj (caretaker)
- 2015: CFR Cluj (assistant)
- 2015: CFR Cluj (caretaker)
- 2015: CFR Cluj
- 2016: Auxerre (assistant)
- 2017–2018: Dinamo București (assistant)
- 2018–2020: Chindia Târgoviște (assistant)
- 2020–2021: Petrolul Ploiești (assistant)
- 2021–2022: FK Csíkszereda (technical director)
- 2022: FK Csíkszereda
- 2022–2023: FK Csíkszereda (head of scouting)
- 2023–2024: Sănătatea Cluj
- 2024: CFR Cluj (assistant)
- 2024: Minaur Baia Mare
- 2024–2025: Politehnica Iași (assistant)
- 2025: Minaur Baia Mare
- * Club domestic league appearances and goals

Francisc Dican (born 26 October 1967) is a Romanian professional football manager and former player.

== Honours ==
Universitatea Cluj

- Divizia B: 1991–92
