= Techirghiol =

- Town
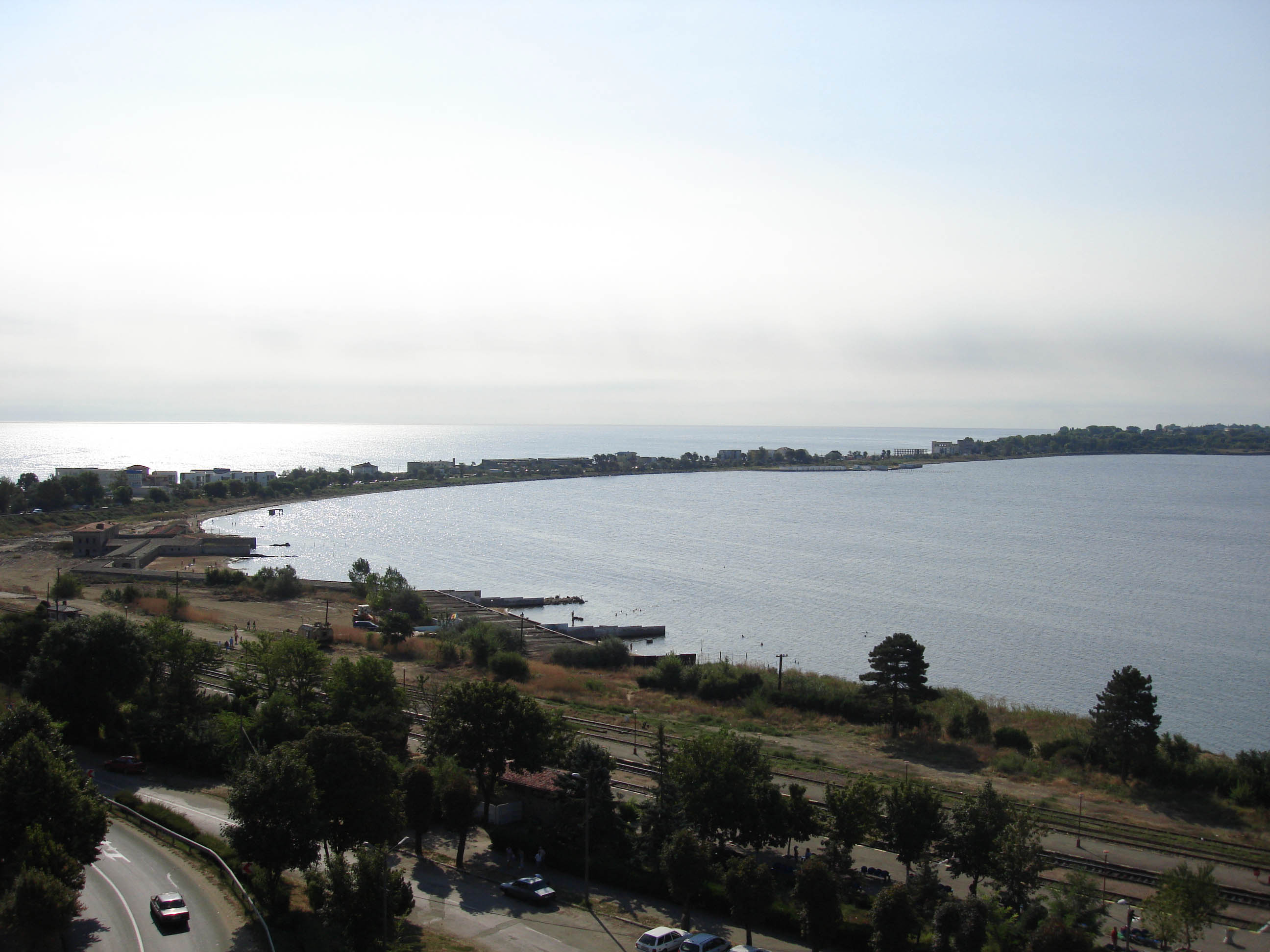

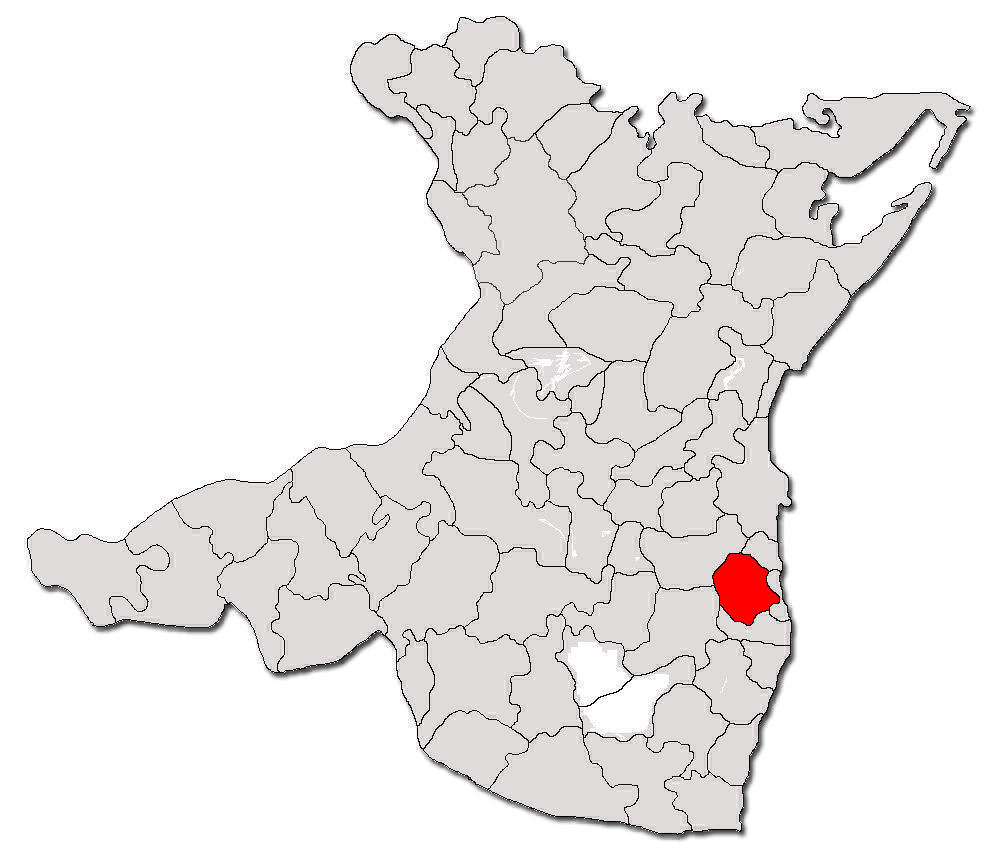
- Location in Constanța County

- Location in Romania
- Coordinates: 44°3′27″N 28°35′45″E
- Country: Romania
- County: Constanța

Government
  - Mayor (2024–2028): Iulian Constantin Soceanu (PNL)
- Area: 46.07 km^{2} (17.79 sq mi)
- Population (2021-12-01): 8,061
  - Density: 175.0/km^{2} (453.2/sq mi)
- Time zone: UTC+02:00 (EET)
  - Summer (DST): UTC+03:00 (EEST)
- Vehicle reg.: CT
- Website: www.primariatechirghiol.ro

Techirghiol (Romanian pronunciation: [ˈtekirɡjol], historical name: Tekirgöl) is a town in Constanța County, Northern Dobruja, Romania.

== Etymology ==
The name is derived from the Turkish Tekirgöl which means "the lake of Tekir". According to a legend, a blind and crippled old man named Tekir and his old donkey reached the shore of the lake by mistake. Trying to pull his stubborn animal out of the mud, Tekir was miraculously healed so he could see and walk normally again. Since then the lake has become famous for its healing properties.

Tekir and his donkey are featured in a statue located in the center of the town.

The name also means (in Turkish) "Striped Lake" (tekir - striped, and göl - lake). This is because of the salinity of the lake; when the wind blows, white salt stripes appear on the surface of the lake.

== Location ==
Town is in the south east extremity of Romania (Constanța County), situated on the north west shore of Lake Techirghiol (11.6 km^{2}), elevation 15–20 m, 18 km south of the municipality of Constanța and very close to the Black Sea (3 km).

In Techirghiol the winters are mild and the summers are warm, dominant being the clear skies (the sun shines for more than 2,400 hours every year).

== History ==
Human habitation in the region dates back to the Neolithic period. Archaeological research in 1924 indicated that the settlement of Techirghiol was part of the second phase of the Hamangia culture that began to emerge in the Dobruja region.

Techirghiol was first marked on the country's map in 1893, but developed steadily after 1912, establishing itself as a spa town.

In 1891, Hagi Pandele opened its doors, the first hotel and cold baths establishment in the town. In 1900 the extraction of therapeutic mud initiated and this led to the construction of many bathing establishments and hotels.

After World War I, in 1920, Techirghiol started to become a very popular tourist attraction due to its famous therapeutic mud. In 1931, the Heroes Monument was inaugurated in the “General I. Dragalina” Square, in memory of the soldiers who died in World War I.

Today, Techirghiol continues to be a sought-after destination for those seeking the healing benefits of its natural resources.

== Techirghiol Balneotherapy Center ==
The sapropelic mud from the Techirghiol Lake is the jewel of the resort. In 1924, at the Universal Exposition from Paris, the Techirghiol mud received the golden medal. Alphons Saligny was the first to study the therapeutic use of the mud; after this the Romanian Institute of Balneology approved it and during the 1930s the studies realized by Alphons Saligny and the Institute were the base for solid scientific proof regarding the therapeutic actions of the sapropelic mud of Techirghiol and the methodology of those treatments.

The sapropelic mud of Techirghiol is used warm for different kind of procedures:

- Wraps
- Cataplasm
- Water mixed, for baths in bathtubs
- Massage

== Places of interest ==
- Lake Techirghiol
- "Saint Mary" Monastery
- Techirghiol Balneotherapy Center
- Catholic Church dedicated to St. Conrad of Parzham
- Bronze Statue of Saint Pantelimon
- Romanian Nautical Club

== Demographics ==
Historical population
Year	Pop.	±%
1930	1,956	—
1948	2,136	+9.2%
1956	2,705	+26.6%
1966	4,643	+71.6%
1977	9,706	+109.0%
1992	6,872	−29.2%
2002	7,388	+7.5%
2011	6,845	−7.3%
2021	8,061	+17.8%
Source: Census data

At the 2021 census, Techirghiol had a population of 8,061. At the 2011 census, the town had 6,845 inhabitants; of those, 5,646 were Romanians (82.48%), 8 Hungarians (0.12%), 27 Roma (0.39%), 336 Turks (4.91%), 615 Tatars (8.98%), 6 Lipovans (0.09%), 17 Aromanians (0.25%), 184 others (2.69%), and 6 with undeclared ethnicity (0.09%).

== Notable natives ==
- Jean Constantin, Romanian actor
