= FC Brașov (2021) =

Brașov
- Full name: Asociația Clubul Sportiv Fotbal Club Brașov – Steagul Renaște
- Nicknames: Stegarii (The Flag-bearers); Galben-negrii (The Yellow-Blacks); Echipa de sub Tâmpa (The Tâmpa Team)
- Short name: Brașov
- Founded: 2021
- Dissolved: 2023
- Ground: Silviu Ploeșteanu
- Capacity: 8,800

Asociația Clubul Sportiv Fotbal Club Brașov – Steagul Renaște (Romanian pronunciation: [braˈʃov]), commonly known as FC Brașov or simply Brașov, was a Romanian professional football club based in Brașov, Brașov County, which existed between 2021 and 2023.

The club was founded in 2021 with the stated aim of succeeding the original FC Brașov, which had been dissolved in 2017. The new entity was allowed to use the historic club's brand and received support from the local authorities, but its sporting continuity was disputed. It was directly admitted to Liga II in place of Corona Brașov, a former rival of the original FC Brașov, and competed for only two seasons before ceasing activity in 2023.

The Silviu Ploeșteanu Stadium, with a capacity of 8,800 seats, served as the home ground of both the original club and the 2021–2023 entity.

== History ==
=== Foundation, collapse and dissolution (2021–2026) ===
The original FC Brașov, founded in 1936, went bankrupt in 2017 after several years of financial problems and insolvency.

In 2021, ACS FC Brașov Steagul Renaște was formed on the structure of ACS Scotch Club. The newly promoted Corona Brașov transferred its place in Liga II to the new club, while the Municipality of Brașov granted it the right to use the FC Brașov name, colours and sporting record.

The project was opposed by a section of the former FC Brașov support, which continued to back the fan-owned SR Brașov instead.

FC Brașov competed for two seasons in Liga II. In 2021–22, it avoided relegation after a play-out campaign and a relegation play-off, while in 2022–23 it finished seventh overall.

In the summer of 2023, the club failed to obtain the certification required to participate in the 2023–24 Liga II. Its appeal to the Court of Arbitration for Sport was rejected on 7 August 2023, confirming its exclusion from the competition.

The senior team did not enter Liga III and ceased competitive activity in 2023. The remaining junior teams were excluded from competitions organised by the Romanian Football Federation in February 2024.

The association entered insolvency in December 2024. On 26 February 2026, the Brașov Tribunal ordered the club into bankruptcy under the simplified procedure, ending any possibility of reorganisation and starting the liquidation process.

== Grounds ==
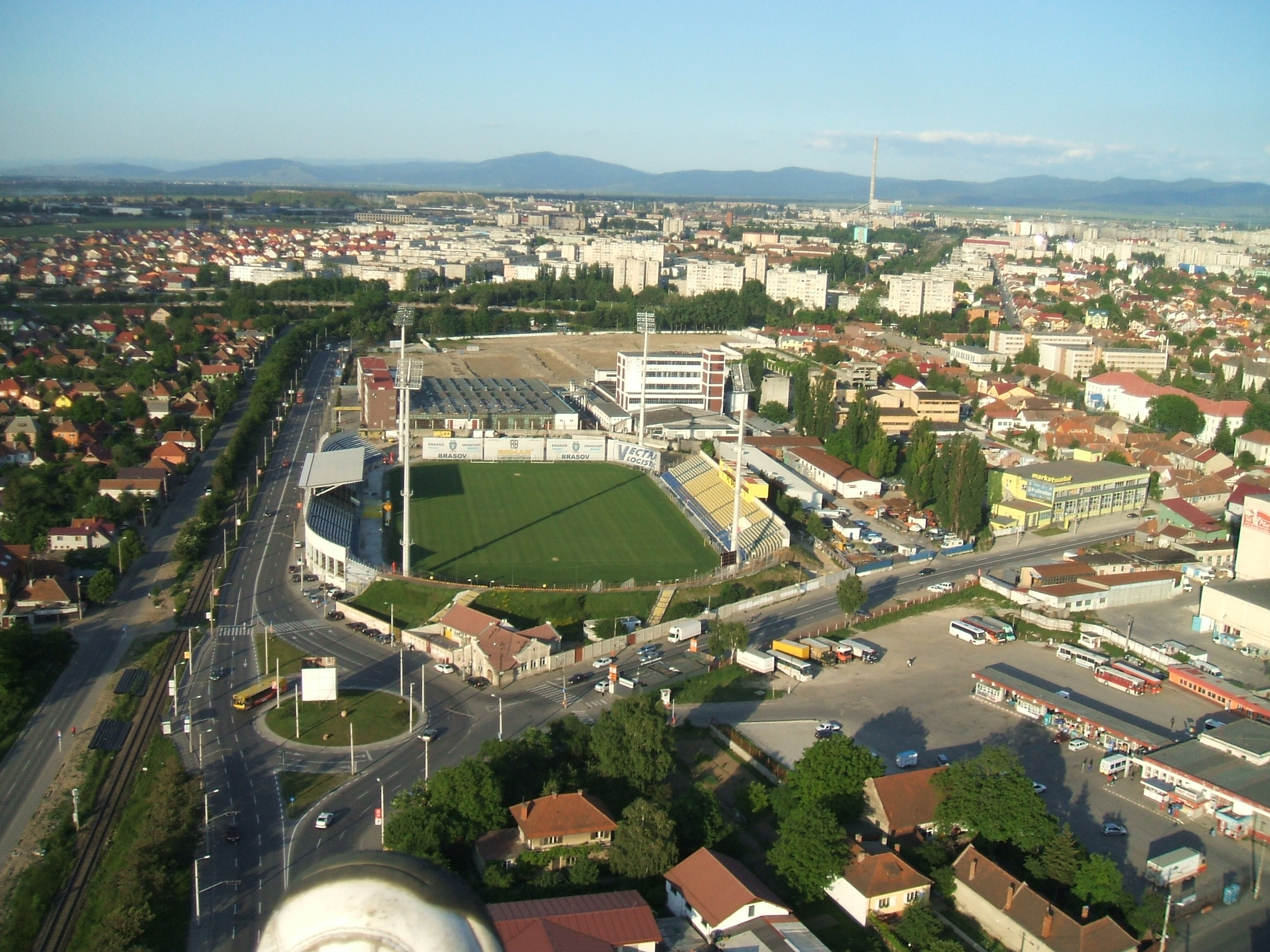
Stadionul Silviu Ploeșteanu.

FC Brașov plays its home matches at the Silviu Ploeșteanu Stadium in Brașov, with a capacity of 8,800 seats.

== Support ==
The Flag-Bearers League Supporters (FC Brașov fans) decided not to support the new team, a team that was considered by them to be only a "political vehicle". Instead of FC Brașov, they will continue to support SR Brașov, a club founded by them in 2017, like a phoenix club of FC Brașov (1936).

== League history ==
| Season | Tier | Division | Place | Cupa României |
|---|---|---|---|---|
| 2021–22 | 2 | Liga II | 16th (O) | Round 3 |
| 2022–23 | 2 | Liga II | 9th (R) | Play-off |
