= 2018–19 Liga II =

Liga II
- Season: 2018–19
- Country: Romania
- Teams: 20
- Promoted: Chindia Târgoviște; Academica Clinceni
- Relegated: Luceafărul Oradea; Aerostar Bacău; ACS Poli Timișoara; Balotești; Dacia Unirea Brăila
- Matches: 380
- Goals: 1,084 (2.85 per match)
- Top goalscorer: V. Buhăcianu (25) (Aerostar Bacău)
- Biggest home win: Aerostar 9–0 Brăila
- Biggest away win: Brăila 0–8 U Cluj
- Highest scoring: Aerostar 9–1 Metalo. Petrolul 9–1 Brăila
- Longest winning run: 9 matches: Chindia Târgoviște
- Longest unbeaten run: 19 matches: Universitatea Cluj
- Longest winless run: 16 matches: ACS Poli Timișoara; Dacia Unirea Brăila; Energeticianul
- Longest losing run: 9 matches: Dacia Unirea Brăila
- Highest attendance: 10,000; Petrolul 1–0 U Cluj (30 March 2019)
- Lowest attendance: 50; Oradea 1–0 Clinceni (22 September 2018); Snagov 2–0 Energetic. (3 November 2018); Balotești 1–1 Aerostar (28 November 2018); Metalo. 0–1 ASU Poli (28 November 2018); Snagov 1–0 Argeș (28 November 2018); Ripensia 1–0 Farul (28 November 2018); Ripensia 2–0 Brăila (1 December 2018); Balotești 0–2 Mioveni (23 February 2019); Argeș 2–1 Ripensia (10 May 2019); Brăila 0–6 Mioveni (15 May 2019)
- All statistics correct as of 1 June 2019.

The 2018–19 Liga II (also known as 2018–19 Liga II Casa Pariurilor) was the 79th season of the Liga II, the second tier of the Romanian football league system. The season began on 4 August 2018 and ended on 1 June 2019.

A total of 20 teams contested the league. It was the third Liga II season with a single series. The season was played in a round-robin tournament. The first two teams were promoted to Liga I at the end of the season and the third-placed team played a play-off match against the 12th-placed team from Liga I. The last five teams were relegated to Liga III.

== Team changes ==
=== To Liga II ===
Promoted from Liga III

- Aerostar Bacău
  (after 26 years of absence)
- Farul Constanța
  (after 2 years of absence)
- Petrolul Ploiești
  (after 7 years of absence)
- Șirineasa
  (debut)
- Universitatea Cluj
  (after 2 years of absence)

Relegated from Liga I

- ACS Poli Timișoara
  (after 3 years of absence)
- Juventus București
  (after 1 year of absence)

=== From Liga II ===
Relegated to Liga III

- Afumați
  (ended 2-year stay)
- Știința Miroslava
  (ended 1-year stay)
- Foresta Suceava
  (ended 6-year stay)
- Târgu Mureș
  (ended 1-year stay)
- Olimpia Satu Mare
  (ended 5-year stay)

Promoted to Liga I

- Dunărea Călărași
  (ended 2-year stay)
- Hermannstadt
  (ended 1-year stay)

=== Excluded teams ===
Afumați withdrew from Liga II after the end of the last season and was enrolled instead in the Liga III, a move made due to financial reasons.

=== Teams spared from relegation ===
Metaloglobus București was spared from relegation due to withdrawal of Afumați.

=== Renamed teams ===
Juventus București was renamed as Daco-Getica București after being summoned by Juventus Torino to remove the term "Juventus" from its name.

Șirineasa was renamed as Energeticianul.

== Stadiums by capacity ==
Club	City	Stadium	Capacity
Academica	Clinceni	Clinceni	2,800
ACS Poli	Timișoara	Electrica / Dan Păltinișanu	5,000 / 32,972
Aerostar	Bacău	Aerostar	1,500
Argeș	Pitești	Nicolae Dobrin	15,000
ASU Politehnica	Timișoara	Dan Păltinișanu / Știința	32,972 / 1,000
Balotești	Balotești	Central	3,780
Chindia	Târgoviște	Eugen Popescu	6,500
Dacia Unirea	Brăila	Municipal	20,154
Daco-Getica	Bucharest	Colentina	6,000
Energeticianul	Petroșani	Jiul	15,550
Farul	Constanța	Farul / Sparta	15,520 / 2,000
Luceafărul	Oradea	Luceafărul	2,200
Metaloglobus	Bucharest	Metaloglobus	1,000
Mioveni	Mioveni	Orășenesc	7,000
Pandurii	Târgu Jiu	Tudor Vladimirescu (second ground)	1,500
Petrolul	Ploiești	Ilie Oană	15,073
Ripensia	Timișoara	Ciarda Roșie / Dan Păltinișanu	1,000 / 32,972
Sportul	Snagov	Voința	2,000
Universitatea	Cluj-Napoca	Cluj Arena	30,201
UTA	Arad	Motorul	4,000

== Stadiums by locations ==
Location of teams in 2018–19 Liga II

== Personnel and kits ==
Note: Flags indicate national team as has been defined under FIFA eligibility rules. Players and Managers may hold more than one non-FIFA nationality.

Team	Manager	Captain	Kit manufacturer	Shirt sponsor
Academica Clinceni	(Romania) Ilie Poenaru	(Romania) Răzvan Patriche	Joma	Bel Profile, Nicmar Prima
ACS Poli Timișoara	(Romania) Valeriu Răchită	(Italy) Lorenzo Paramatti	Joma / Beltona	—
Aerostar Bacău	(Romania) Andrei Vatră	(Romania) Cătălin Vraciu	Nike	Aerostar S.A.
Argeș Pitești	(Romania) Augustin Eduard	(Romania) Raul Costin	Macron	Primăria Pitești
ASU Politehnica Timișoara	(Romania) Cosmin Petruescu	(Romania) Ioan Mera	Westiment / Macron	De Construct Ind
Balotești	(Romania) Ciprian Niță	(Romania) Bogdan Marciuc	Jako	Hotel Mirage
Chindia Târgoviște	(Romania) Viorel Moldovan	(Romania) Cristian Cherchez	Joma / Acerbis	Regata
Dacia Unirea Brăila	(Romania) Florentin Petre	(Netherlands) Adreano van den Driest	Joma	Rodbun, Comision Trade
Daco-Getica București	(Romania) Marius Baciu	(Romania) Cristian Bustea	Joma	Supercom
Energeticianul	(Romania) Viorel Tănase	(Romania) Daniel Lung	Joma / Luanvi	Vitalact, Succes
Farul Constanța	(Romania) Petre Grigoraș	(Romania) Raul Avram	Macron / Joma	—
Luceafărul Oradea	(Romania) Cristian Lupuț	(Romania) Cristian Oroș	Adidas	—
Metaloglobus București	(Romania) László Balint	(Romania) Ovidiu Herea	Jako	—
Mioveni	(Romania) Marius Stoica	(Brazil) Roberto Ayza	Joma	Primăria Mioveni
Pandurii Târgu Jiu	(Romania) Adrian Bogoi	(Romania) Denis Brînzan	Joma	—
Petrolul Ploiești	(Romania) Gheorghe Mulțescu	(Romania) Laurențiu Marinescu	Joma	Veolia
Ripensia Timișoara	(Romania) Alexandru Pelici	(Romania) Călin Toma	ILA	Almira
Sportul Snagov	(Romania) Eugen Trică	(Romania) Florin Ilie	Macron / Acerbis	Snagov Plaza
Universitatea Cluj	(Romania) Bogdan Lobonț	(Romania) Gabriel Giurgiu	Erima	IRUM, De'Longhi, Untold
UTA Arad	(Romania) Ionuț Popa	(Romania) Ciprian Rus	Saller	Primăria Arad

== Managerial changes ==
Team	Outgoing manager	Manner of departure	Date of vacancy	Position in table	Incoming manager	Date of appointment
ACS Poli	(Romania) Adrian Neaga	End of contract	30 June 2018	Pre-season	(Romania) Ionel Ganea	1 July 2018
ASU Politehnica	(Romania) Antonio Foale (caretaker)	End of tenure as a caretaker	30 June 2018	Pre-season	(Romania) Cosmin Petruescu	1 July 2018
Balotești	(Romania) Emil Stanca (caretaker)	End of tenure as a caretaker	30 June 2018	Pre-season	(Romania) Emil Ursu	1 July 2018
Chindia	(Romania) Nicolae Croitoru	End of contract	30 June 2018	Pre-season	(Romania) Viorel Moldovan	1 July 2018
Mioveni	(Romania) Iordan Eftimie (caretaker)	End of tenure as a caretaker	30 June 2018	Pre-season	(Romania) Iordan Eftimie	1 July 2018
Petrolul	(Romania) Romulus Ciobanu	End of contract	30 June 2018	Pre-season	(Romania) Leontin Grozavu	1 July 2018
Snagov	(Romania) Valeriu Răchită	End of contract	30 June 2018	Pre-season	(Romania) László Balint	1 July 2018
Dacia Unirea	(Romania) Alin Pânzaru	End of contract	30 June 2018	Pre-season	(Romania) Gheorghe Barbu	14 July 2018
Metaloglobus	(Romania) Alin Chița	End of contract	30 June 2018	Pre-season	(Romania) Bogdan Andone	20 July 2018
Farul	(Romania) Petre Grigoraș	Mutual agreement	2 July 2018	Pre-season	(Romania) Ion Barbu	20 July 2018
ACS Poli	(Romania) Ionel Ganea	Mutual agreement	20 August 2018	12	(Romania) Petre Vlătănescu (caretaker)	21 August 2018
Dacia Unirea	(Romania) Gheorghe Barbu	Mutual agreement	23 August 2018	15	(Romania) Dorin Romică (caretaker)	23 August 2018
ACS Poli	(Romania) Petre Vlătănescu (caretaker)	End of tenure as a caretaker	27 August 2018	15	(Romania) Ștefan Nanu	27 August 2018
Dacia Unirea	(Romania) Dorin Romică (caretaker)	End of tenure as a caretaker	27 August 2018	18	(Romania) Florentin Petre	27 August 2018
Ripensia	(Romania) Ciprian Urican	Mutual agreement	5 September 2018	15	(Romania) Radu Suciu (caretaker)	5 September 2018
Energeticianul	(Romania) Cristian Dulca	Mutual agreement	9 September 2018	9	(Romania) George Zima (caretaker)	11 September 2018
Balotești	(Romania) Emil Ursu	Resigned	10 September 2018	19	(Romania) Emil Stanca (caretaker)	10 September 2018
Balotești	(Romania) Emil Stanca (caretaker)	End of tenure as a caretaker	14 September 2018	19	(Romania) Ștefan Nofitovici	14 September 2018
Farul	(Romania) Ion Barbu	Resigned	15 September 2018	15	(Romania) Petre Grigoraș	21 September 2018
Energeticianul	(Romania) George Zima (caretaker)	End of tenure as a caretaker	26 September 2018	10	(Romania) Marin Tudorache	26 September 2018
Metaloglobus	(Romania) Bogdan Andone	Signed by Energeticianul	9 October 2018	12	(Romania) Gigel Coman (caretaker)	9 October 2018
Energeticianul	(Romania) Marin Tudorache	Mutual agreement	9 October 2018	9	(Romania) Bogdan Andone	9 October 2018
Petrolul	(Romania) Leontin Grozavu	Sacked	19 October 2018	6	(Romania) Octavian Grigore (caretaker)	19 October 2018
Universitatea	(Romania) Adrian Falub	Mutual agreement	19 October 2018	5	(Romania) Mircea Cojocaru (caretaker)	19 October 2018
Aerostar	(Romania) Cristian Popovici	Mutual agreement	20 October 2018	18	(Romania) Florin Bratu	20 October 2018
Metaloglobus	(Romania) Gigel Coman (caretaker)	End of tenure as a caretaker	27 October 2018	13	(Romania) Cristian Popovici	27 October 2018
Ripensia	(Romania) Radu Suciu (caretaker)	End of tenure as a caretaker	29 October 2018	16	(Romania) Iulian Muntean (caretaker)	30 October 2018
Ripensia	(Romania) Iulian Muntean (caretaker)	End of tenure as a caretaker	7 November 2018	17	(Romania) Alexandru Pelici	7 November 2018
Petrolul	(Romania) Octavian Grigore (caretaker)	End of tenure as a caretaker	29 November 2018	4	(Romania) Mugurel Cornățeanu (caretaker)	29 November 2018
Universitatea	(Romania) Mircea Cojocaru (caretaker)	End of tenure as a caretaker	7 December 2018	5	(Romania) Bogdan Lobonț	7 December 2018
ACS Poli	(Romania) Ștefan Nanu	Mutual agreement	13 December 2018	20	(Romania) Valeriu Răchită	13 December 2018
Petrolul	(Romania) Mugurel Cornățeanu (caretaker)	End of tenure as a caretaker	19 December 2018	3	(Romania) Mugurel Cornățeanu	19 December 2018
Mioveni	(Romania) Iordan Eftimie	Mutual agreement	8 January 2019	7	(Romania) Daniel Oprița	8 January 2019
Balotești	(Romania) Ștefan Nofitovici	Signed by Mioveni (assistant)	10 January 2019	18	(Romania) Gheorghe Mihali	25 January 2019
Energeticianul	(Romania) Bogdan Andone	Signed by FCSB (assistant)	10 January 2019	8	(Romania) George Zima (caretaker)	13 January 2018
Metaloglobus	(Romania) Cristian Popovici	Mutual agreement	14 January 2019	16	(Romania) László Balint	17 January 2019
Snagov	(Romania) László Balint	Signed by Metaloglobus	16 January 2018	1	(Romania) Eugen Trică	20 January 2018
Energeticianul	(Romania) George Zima (caretaker)	End of tenure as a caretaker	21 February 2019	8	(Romania) George Zima	21 February 2019
Argeș	(Romania) Emil Săndoi	Resigned	23 March 2019	6	(Romania) Augustin Eduard	26 March 2019
Petrolul	(Romania) Mugurel Cornățeanu	Mutual agreement	25 March 2019	5	(Romania) Gheorghe Mulțescu	25 March 2019
Balotești	(Romania) Gheorghe Mihali	Sacked	8 April 2019	18	(Romania) Ciprian Niță	8 April 2019
Energeticianul	(Romania) George Zima	Released	12 April 2019	13	(Romania) Emil Szolomajer (caretaker)	12 April 2019
Energeticianul	(Romania) Emil Szolomajer (caretaker)	End of tenure as a caretaker	15 April 2019	14	(Romania) Viorel Tănase	15 April 2019
Aerostar	(Romania) Florin Bratu	Released	5 May 2019	17	(Romania) Andrei Vatră (caretaker)	6 May 2019
Mioveni	(Romania) Daniel Oprița	Sacked	10 May 2019	7	(Romania) Marius Stoica (caretaker)	13 May 2019

== League table ==
Pos	Team	Pld	W	D	L	GF	GA	GD	Pts	Promotion or relegation
1	Chindia Târgoviște (C, P)	38	27	7	4	79	33	+46	88	Promotion to Liga I
2	Academica Clinceni (P)	38	28	3	7	77	24	+53	87	Promotion to Liga I
3	Universitatea Cluj	38	25	7	6	85	26	+59	82	Qualification to promotion play-off
4	Petrolul Ploiești	38	24	5	9	77	38	+39	77	
5	Sportul Snagov	38	21	7	10	56	37	+19	70	
6	Argeș Pitești	38	20	8	10	54	33	+21	68	
7	Mioveni	38	18	7	13	63	41	+22	61	
8	Luceafărul Oradea (Note: Luceafărul Oradea withdrew from Liga II after the end of the season and was enrolled instead in the Liga III, a move made due to financial reasons.) (R)	38	14	10	14	57	59	−2	52	Relegation to Liga III
9	Metaloglobus București	38	14	7	17	43	56	−13	49	
10	ASU Politehnica Timișoara	38	13	9	16	39	38	+1	48	
11	Daco-Getica București	38	11	14	13	54	55	−1	47 (Note: Head-to-head points: Daco-Getica București 10 pts, Ripensia Timișoara 9 pts, UTA Arad 8pts, Farul Constanța 3 pts)	
12	Ripensia Timișoara	38	12	11	15	44	54	−10	47	
13	UTA Arad	38	13	8	17	55	64	−9	47	
14	Farul Constanța	38	14	5	19	46	60	−14	47	
15	Pandurii Târgu Jiu	38	12	8	18	57	65	−8	44	
16	Energeticianul	38	9	12	17	46	55	−9	39	
17	Aerostar Bacău (R)	38	11	5	22	60	68	−8	38	Relegation to Liga III
18	ACS Poli Timișoara (R)	38	7	8	23	31	67	−36	29	Relegation to Liga III
19	Balotești (R)	38	6	6	26	31	88	−57	24	Relegation to Liga III
20	Dacia Unirea Brăila (R)	38	4	7	27	30	123	−93	19	Relegation to Liga III

Source: FRF (in Romanian), Soccerway
Rules for classification: 1) Points; 2) Head-to-head points; 3) Head-to-head goal difference; 4) Head-to-head goals scored; 5) Head-to-head away goals scored; 6) Goal difference; 7) Goals scored.
(C) Champions; (P) Promoted; (R) Relegated

== Season results ==
Home \ Away	ACA	ACS	AER	ARG	ASU	BAL	CHI	DUB	DGB	ENE	FAR	LUC	MET	MIO	PAN	PET	RIP	SNA	UCJ	UTA
Academica Clinceni		1–0	2–1	2–1	2–0	4–0	0–1	7–0	5–0	3–1	1–0	5–0	1–0	2–1	4–1	2–1	1–1	0–1	0–0	2–0
ACS Poli Timișoara	1–3		1–2	1–0	1–2	3–1	1–3	2–2	0–0	1–1	3–0	1–1	1–0	1–4	1–1	0–1	1–0	1–2	0–3	0–3
Aerostar Bacău	0–3	1–0		1–0	1–2	7–2	0–2	9–0	2–1	1–1	2–2	3–1	9–1	0–3	0–1	0–2	2–0	0–2	1–2	1–0
Argeș Pitești	1–0	5–0	2–1		0–0	2–0	0–1	4–1	1–1	0–0	0–1	3–0	2–0	2–0	3–1	3–0	2–1	3–2	2–1	2–1
ASU Politehnica Timișoara	2–2	0–1	1–2	2–3		4–3	0–1	4–0	1–1	0–0	1–0	0–0	2–0	1–0	1–1	3–0	0–1	1–2	1–0	1–3
Balotești	1–3	2–0	1–1	4–0	1–0		1–4	2–2	1–1	1–4	0–1	0–0	0–3	0–2	2–1	0–3	0–2	0–0	0–2	1–3
Chindia Târgoviște	1–0	1–0	3–2	1–1	2–1	6–0		3–0	4–2	2–2	5–1	4–1	2–1	0–2	2–1	0–0	4–2	4–1	2–1	4–2
Dacia Unirea Brăila	0–2	2–0	3–3	0–2	0–2	1–0	0–1		2–1	3–1	0–2	1–1	2–2	0–6	0–4	2–3	1–2	0–3	0–8	0–0
Daco-Getica București	0–2	3–1	3–0	1–0	1–1	1–2	2–2	5–2		0–0	3–0	3–1	1–1	1–0	2–2	1–2	1–1	1–3	2–6	2–0
Energeticianul	0–1	3–0	4–3	0–0	2–1	3–0	0–2	4–0	2–1		0–1	4–0	2–1	0–0	1–2	0–3	2–3	3–3	0–2	2–2
Farul Constanța	1–4	4–1	2–1	3–1	1–1	2–0	1–0	2–0	0–0	1–0		5–0	1–2	0–3	2–0	0–3	1–1	1–2	0–3	1–1
Luceafărul Oradea	1–0	4–2	4–0	1–2	0–0	4–1	0–0	6–0	1–0	2–1	5–0		3–0	2–2	1–0	3–1	2–2	1–1	1–3	0–1
Metaloglobus București	0–1	1–0	1–1	1–0	0–1	1–0	0–0	2–2	2–3	3–0	2–1	0–1		2–0	6–0	1–0	1–1	1–0	0–1	3–0
Mioveni	2–1	1–1	2–0	0–1	1–0	3–0	1–4	4–0	2–1	2–1	0–2	2–1	5–0		2–2	1–2	4–1	0–4	1–1	3–0
Pandurii Târgu Jiu	0–2	1–1	2–0	1–1	1–0	4–0	0–2	5–2	0–2	2–0	5–3	0–0	1–2	2–0		0–2	5–2	2–0	1–5	1–2
Petrolul Ploiești	2–3	1–0	5–0	1–2	2–0	5–1	2–0	9–1	1–3	2–0	2–1	6–2	1–1	0–0	2–1		1–0	0–0	1–0	2–2
Ripensia Timișoara	0–3	2–3	1–0	1–1	0–1	2–1	0–2	2–0	1–1	1–1	1–0	2–0	0–1	1–1	2–1	0–2		1–2	1–1	1–0
Sportul Snagov	0–2	0–0	1–0	1–0	2–0	4–1	0–1	1–0	2–1	2–0	1–0	2–4	3–0	2–0	3–2	0–1	1–1		0–0	2–1
Universitatea Cluj	3–0	4–0	3–2	0–0	1–0	0–0	3–1	6–1	1–1	3–0	2–1	2–0	2–0	1–2	2–0	3–2	2–3	1–0		3–0
UTA Arad	0–1	2–1	2–1	1–2	0–2	0–2	2–2	3–0	1–1	1–1	4–2	0–3	6–1	2–1	3–3	2–4	2–1	3–1	0–4	

Source: Liga 2
Legend: Blue = home team win; Yellow = draw; Red = away team win.

== Liga I play-off ==
The 12th-placed team of the Liga I faces the 3rd-placed team of the Liga II.

Team 1	Agg.	Team 2	1st leg	2nd leg
Hermannstadt	2–1	Universitatea Cluj	2–0	0–1

9 June 2019	Universitatea Cluj	0–2	Hermannstadt	Cluj-Napoca
18:00 EEST (UTC+3)		Report	Petrescu 79'; Tsoumou 80'	Stadium: Cluj Arena; Attendance: 25,664; Referee: Andrei Chivulete (Bucharest)

12 June 2019	Hermannstadt	0–1	Universitatea Cluj	Sibiu
18:00 EEST (UTC+3)		Report	Goga 64'	Stadium: Municipal; Attendance: 4,500; Referee: Marius Avram (Bucharest)

== Season statistics ==
=== Top scorers ===
Updated to matches played on 1 June 2019.

Rank	Player	Club	Goals
1	(Romania) Valentin Buhăcianu	Aerostar Bacău	25
2	(Romania) Cristian Gavra	Universitatea Cluj	22
3	(Romania) Dorin Goga	Universitatea Cluj	19
4	(Romania) Vasile Buhăescu	Argeș Pitești	17
4	(Romania) Cristian Cherchez	Chindia Târgoviște	17
4	(Romania) Ciprian Rus	UTA Arad	17
7	(Romania) Liviu Mihai	Chindia Târgoviște	16
7	(Romania) Daniel Pîrvulescu	Pandurii Târgu Jiu (12) / Universitatea Cluj (4)	16
7	(Romania) Cătălin Vraciu	Aerostar Bacău	16
10	(Romania) Valentin Balint	Mioveni	15
10	(Romania) Vasile Pop	Luceafărul Oradea	15

=== Clean sheets ===
Updated to matches played on 1 June 2019.

Rank	Player	Club	Clean sheets
1	(Romania) Cosmin Dur-Bozoancă	Universitatea Cluj	20
2	(Romania) Mihai Aioani	Chindia Târgoviște	16
3	(Romania) Florin Iacob	Sportul Snagov (9) / Metaloglobus București (6)	15
4	(Romania) Andrei Ureche	Argeș Pitești (7) / Academica Clinceni (5)	12
4	(Romania) Octavian Vâlceanu	Academica Clinceni	12
6	(Romania) Rareș Murariu	ASU Politehnica Timișoara	11
7	(Romania) Raul Avram	Dacia Unirea Brăila (2) / Farul Constanța (8)	10
8	(Romania) Árpád Tordai	Petrolul Ploiești	9
9	(Romania) Mihai Cotolan	Pandurii Târgu Jiu	8
9	(Romania) Cezar Lungu	Petrolul Ploiești	8
9	(Romania) Bogdan Moga	Luceafărul Oradea	8

^{*}Only goalkeepers who played all 90 minutes of a match are taken into consideration.

=== Attendances ===
Pos	Team	Total	High	Low	Average	Change
1	Petrolul Ploiești	73,000	10,000	1,000	3,842	n/a^{5}
2	Universitatea Cluj	67,691	7,500	600	3,563	n/a^{5}
3	Chindia Târgoviște	49,100	6,600	800	2,584	+39.9%
4	Argeș Pitești	24,250	4,000	50	1,276	−16.8%
5	ASU Politehnica Timișoara	24,150	4,000	250	1,271	+28.8%
6	UTA Arad	21,400	3,000	250	1,126	+181.5%
7	Farul Constanța	15,500	2,000	200	861	n/a^{5;1}
8	Mioveni	14,900	6,000	200	784	+27.9%
9	Pandurii Târgu Jiu	11,250	1,200	100	592	+104.8%
10	Aerostar Bacău	9,840	1,400	90	518	n/a^{5}
11	Daco-Getica București	7,300	1,000	200	384	−40.8%^{4}
12	Academica Clinceni	6,550	750	50	345	+182.8%
13	Dacia Unirea Brăila	5,850	700	50	308	−12.7%
14	Metaloglobus București	5,850	1,500	50	308	+182.6%
15	Ripensia Timișoara	5,730	2,500	50	302	+2.0%
16	Sportul Snagov	5,400	800	50	284	+163.0%^{2}
17	Energeticianul	4,920	500	70	259	n/a^{5}
18	ACS Poli Timișoara	4,690	800	70	247	−88.1%^{4}
19	Luceafărul Oradea	4,500	1,000	50	237	−47.0%
20	Balotești	4,050	500	50	213	+53.2%^{2}
	League total	365,921	10,000	50	965	+39.7%

Updated to games played on 1 June 2019
Source: League attendance: Liga II 2018/2019
Notes:
1: Farul Constanța played five matches out of their stadium until it was renovated to meet Liga II standards.
2: Balotești and Sportul Snagov played one match, respectively two matches out of their stadiums.
4: ACS Poli Timișoara and Daco-Getica București played last season in the Liga I.
5: Aerostar Bacău, Energeticianul, Farul Constanța, Petrolul Ploiești and Universitatea Cluj played last season in the Liga III.
