= Adelin Pîrcălabu =

Romanian footballer

Personal information
- Full name: Adelin Shiva Pîrcălabu
- Date of birth: 1 May 1996 (age 30)
- Place of birth: Târgu Jiu, Romania
- Height: 1.81 m (5 ft 11 in)
- Position: Midfielder

Team information
- Current team: Târgu Jiu
- Number: 7

Youth career
- –2014: Pandurii Târgu Jiu

Senior career*
Years	Team	Apps	(Gls)
2016–2017	Pandurii Târgu Jiu	19	(0)
2017–2019	Voluntari	25	(0)
2019–2021	SCM Gloria Buzău	16	(0)
2021–2023	Viitorul Târgu Jiu	27	(1)
2024	Gilortul Târgu Cărbunești	13	(4)
2024–	Târgu Jiu	0	(0)
- * Club domestic league appearances and goals as of 16:52, 28 December 2024 (UTC)

Adelin Shiva Pîrcălabu (born 1 May 1996) is a Romanian professional footballer who plays as a midfielder for Liga IV club CSM Târgu Jiu.

== Honours ==
Voluntari

- Supercupa României: 2017

Târgu Jiu

- Liga IV – Gorj County: 2024–25
- Cupa României – Gorj County: 2024–25
