= Lü Yuefeng =

Chinese footballer (born 1995)

Lü Yuefeng 吕悦枫
Personal information
- Full name: Lü Yuefeng
- Date of birth: 13 November 1995 (age 30)
- Place of birth: Wuhan, Hubei, China
- Height: 1.76 m (5 ft 9 in)
- Position: Midfielder

Team information
- Current team: Ganzhou Ruishi
- Number: 21

Youth career
- –2011: Dalian Yiteng
- 2012–2014: Dalian Aerbin

Senior career*
Years	Team	Apps	(Gls)
2014–2017	Zhejiang Yiteng	3	(0)
2017–2019	CFR II Cluj	0	(0)
2018–2019	→ Dacia Unirea Brăila (loan)	20	(3)
2019	→ Luceafărul Oradea (loan)	12	(0)
2019–2020	Pandurii Târgu Jiu	16	(1)
2020	Zhejiang Yiteng	1	(0)
2021–2023	Dandong Tengyue	61	(6)
2024	Hunan Billows	22	(1)
2025–	Ganzhou Ruishi	24	(2)
- * Club domestic league appearances and goals as of 31 December 2020

Lü Yuefeng (Chinese: 吕悦枫; pinyin: Lǚ Yuèfēng; born 13 November 1995) is a Chinese professional footballer who plays for China League Two side Ganzhou Ruishi as a midfielder.

== Club career ==
Lü started his professional football career in 2014 when he joined Chinese Super League side Harbin Yiteng. He made his senior debut on 15 April 2015, in a 1–0 FA Cup away loss to Anhui Litian. On 21 June 2015, he made his league debut in a 2–2 draw with Wuhan Zall, coming on as a substitute for Li Xin in the 86th minute.

On 3 September 2017, Lü moved abroad to Romanian first division side CFR Cluj where he was assigned to the reserve team who were allowed to participate in the Liga III division. He would go on to be loaned out to second-tier club Dacia Unirea Brăila for the 2018–19 Liga II season.

On 24 July 2020, Lü returned to Zhejiang Yiteng.

== Career statistics ==
31 December 2020.

Appearances and goals by club, season and competition
Club	Season	League			National Cup		Continental		Other		Total	
Club	Season	Division	Apps	Goals	Apps	Goals	Apps	Goals	Apps	Goals	Apps	Goals
Harbin Yiteng	2014	Chinese Super League	0	0	0	0	-		-		0	0
Harbin Yiteng	2015	China League One	1	0	1	0	-		-		2	0
Harbin Yiteng	2016	China League One	2	0	1	0	-		-		3	0
Harbin Yiteng	2017	China League One	0	0	0	0	-		-		0	0
Harbin Yiteng	Total		3	0	2	0	0	0	0	0	5	0
CFR II Cluj	2017–18	Liga III	0	0	-		-		-		0	0
Dacia Unirea Brăila (loan)	2018–19	Liga II	20	3	0	0	-		-		20	3
Luceafărul Oradea (loan)	2018–19	Liga II	12	0	0	0	-		-		12	0
Pandurii Târgu Jiu	2019–20	Liga II	16	1	0	0	-		-		16	1
Zhejiang Yiteng	2020	China League Two	1	0	-		-		-		1	0
Career total			52	4	2	0	0	0	0	0	54	4
