= Daniel Paraschiv =

Romanian footballer (born 1999)

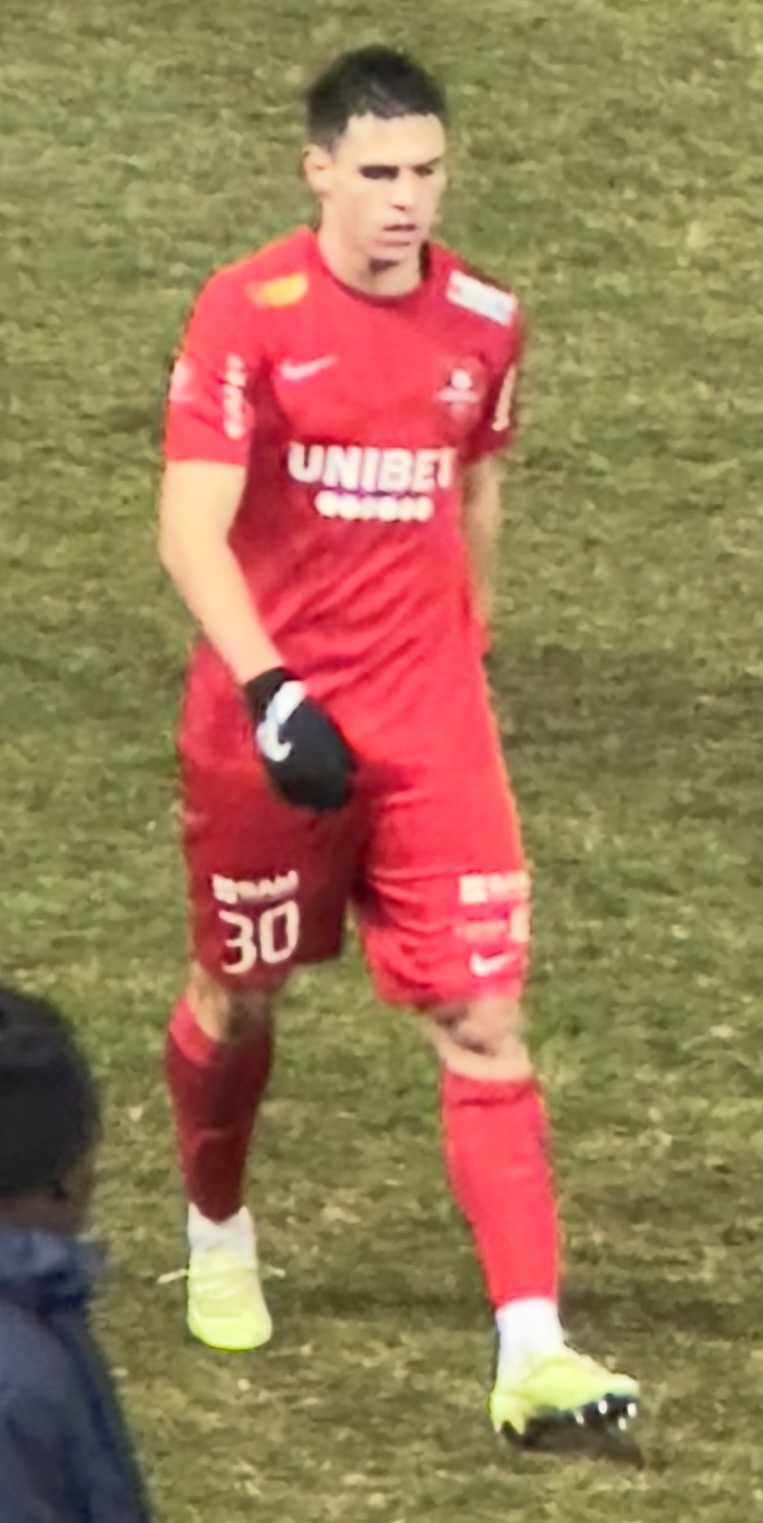
- Paraschiv with Hermannstadt in 2023

Personal information
- Full name: George Daniel Paraschiv
- Date of birth: 24 April 1999 (age 27)
- Place of birth: Brașov, Romania
- Height: 1.85 m (6 ft 1 in)
- Position: Forward

Team information
- Current team: Bnei Sakhnin
- Number: 9

Youth career
- 2005–2017: FC Brașov
- 2015–2016: → Precizia Săcele (loan)

Senior career*
Years	Team	Apps	(Gls)
2017	Viitorul Ghimbav		
2018	AFC Hărman		
2018–2020	Luceafărul Oradea (Note: The statistics for the 2019–20 Liga III season are unavailable.)	33	(14)
2020–2021	Viitorul Târgu Jiu	26	(10)
2021–2022	CFR Cluj	0	(0)
2021	→ Voluntari (loan)	10	(0)
2022	→ Hermannstadt (loan)	13	(6)
2022–2024	Hermannstadt	77	(25)
2024–2026	Oviedo	28	(3)
2025–2026	→ Cultural Leonesa (loan)	7	(0)
2026	→ Rapid București (loan)	18	(4)
2026–	Bnei Sakhnin	7	(0)

International career^{‡}
2022	Romania	1	(1)
- * Club domestic league appearances and goals as of 7 November 2026 ‡ National team caps and goals as of 20 November 2022

George Daniel Paraschiv (born 24 April 1999) is a Romanian professional footballer who plays as a forward for Israeli Premier League club Bnei Sakhnin.

== Club career ==
=== Early career ===
Paraschiv emerged from his hometown club FC Brașov's youth system, where he played until it folded in 2017. That year, he made his senior debut with Viitorul Ghimbav in the third division. He also had a stint at AFC Hărman before joining Liga II side Luceafărul Oradea for the 2018–19 season, amassing 33 appearances and scoring 14 goals in the league.

In the summer of 2019, Paraschiv moved to fellow Liga II team Viitorul Târgu Jiu, though he only featured in two matches during his initial season in Oltenia. He regained his form in the 2020–21 season, scoring 13 goals from 29 matches across all competitions.

=== CFR Cluj ===
Liga I club CFR Cluj announced the signing of Paraschiv on 11 June 2021, but the following month he was loaned out to Voluntari, also in the top flight. He recorded his Liga I debut on 19 July, in a 2–3 away loss to Dinamo București.

Paraschiv netted his only Voluntari goal on 21 September 2021, in a 4–1 defeat of Șomuz Fălticeni in the Cupa României. On 10 January 2022, he returned to the second division on loan at Hermannstadt, where he scored six goals in 13 appearances and helped the team secure promotion to Liga I.

=== Hermannstadt ===
In June 2022, Paraschiv signed a three-year contract to join Hermannstadt on a permanent basis. He scored his first Liga I goal on 15 July, in a 3–0 success over Mioveni. By the end of the year, Paraschiv netted eight more times, including goals against title contenders FCSB, Universitatea Craiova, and CFR Cluj, respectively.

In February 2023, Ukrainian Premier League club Dynamo Kyiv bid €1.2 million for the transfer of Paraschiv, which Hermannstadt accepted. However, Paraschiv rejected the move because of the ongoing Russian invasion of Ukraine.

Paraschiv scored 14 league goals in the 2022–23 season, and added eleven more in the following campaign.

=== Oviedo ===
On 13 July 2024, Paraschiv agreed to a three-year contract with Segunda División club Real Oviedo. The deal was reportedly worth €750,000 plus 25% interest on any future transfer.

Paraschiv scored his first goal on his seventh league appearance for Oviedo, a 4–1 home win over Mirandés on 22 October 2024.

==== Loan to Cultural Leonesa ====
On 1 August 2025, Paraschiv was loaned to Cultural Leonesa in the second division, for one year.

==== Loan to Rapid Bucureşti ====
On 5 January 2026, Paraschiv was loaned to Romanian club Rapid Bucureşti until the summer of 2026, with an option to buy.

== International career ==
Paraschiv made his debut for the Romania national team on 20 November 2022, coming on as a 70th-minute substitute for George Pușcaș in a 5–0 friendly thrashing of Moldova. After only one minute, he scored his side's fourth goal by converting a penalty kick.

== Personal life ==
Paraschiv's parents and brother were born in the Republic of Moldova.

== Career statistics ==
=== Club ===
As of 7 November 2026

Appearances and goals by club, season and competition
Club	Season	League			National cup (Note: Includes Cupa României, Copa del Rey)		Europe		Other		Total	
Club	Season	Division	Apps	Goals	Apps	Goals	Apps	Goals	Apps	Goals	Apps	Goals
Viitorul Ghimbav	2017–18	Liga III					—		—			
AFC Hărman	2017–18	Liga III					—		—			
Luceafărul Oradea	2018–19	Liga II	33	14	1	0	—		—		34	14
Luceafărul Oradea	2019–20	Liga III					—		—			
Luceafărul Oradea	Total		33	14	1	0	0	0	0	0	34	14
Viitorul Târgu Jiu	2019–20	Liga II	2	1	—		—		—		2	1
Viitorul Târgu Jiu	2020–21	Liga II	24	9	4	2	—		—		28	11
Viitorul Târgu Jiu	Total		26	10	4	2	0	0	0	0	30	12
Voluntari (loan)	2021–22	Liga I	10	0	2	1	—		—		12	1
Hermannstadt (loan)	2021–22	Liga II	13	6	—		—		—		13	6
Hermannstadt	2022–23	Liga I	39	14	2	0	—		—		41	14
Hermannstadt	2023–24	Liga I	38	11	3	0	—		—		41	11
Hermannstadt	Total		77	25	5	0	0	0	0	0	82	25
Oviedo	2024–25	Segunda División	28	3	1	0	—		2 (Note: Appearances in Segunda División promotion play-offs)	0	31	3
Cultural Leonesa (loan)	2025–26	Segunda División	7	0	3	1	—		—		10	1
Rapid București (loan)	2025–26	Liga I	18	4	1	0	—		—		19	4
Bnei Sakhnin	2026–27	Israeli Premier League	7	0	0	0	—		—		7	0
Career total			219	62	17	4	0	0	2	0	238	66

=== International ===
As of match played 20 November 2022

Appearances and goals by national team and year
National team	Year	Apps	Goals
Romania	2022	1	1
Total		1	1

Scores and results list Romania's goal tally first, score column indicates score after each Paraschiv goal.

List of international goals scored by Daniel Paraschiv
No.	Date	Venue	Opponent	Score	Result	Competition
1.	20 November 2022	Zimbru Stadium, Chișinău, Moldova	Moldova	4–0	5–0	Friendly
