= CSM Târgu Jiu (football) =

Association football club in Târgu Jiu

- Full name: Clubul Sportiv Municipal Târgu Jiu
- Nicknames: Alb-albaștrii (The White and Blues); Gorjenii (The Gorj County People)
- Short name: CSM
- Founded: 2024; 2 years ago
- Ground: Constantina Diță-Tomescu
- Capacity: 12,518
- Owner: Târgu Jiu Municipality
- Chairman: Robert Bălăeț
- Manager: Mario Găman
- League: Liga III
- 2025–26: Liga III, Seria VI, 7th
- Website: https://csmtargujiu.ro
Home colours	Away colours	Third colours

Clubul Sportiv Municipal Târgu Jiu, commonly known as CSM Târgu Jiu, is a Romanian football team from Târgu Jiu, Gorj County, currently competes in Liga IV – Gorj County, the fourth level of the Romanian football. The team represents the football section of the multi-sport club CSM Târgu Jiu, which also include basketball, handball, and athletics.

== History ==
=== Football tradition in Târgu Jiu ===
Football in Târgu Jiu has a long tradition, closely associated with Pandurii Târgu Jiu, the city's most prominent football club. Founded in 1962, Pandurii gradually rose through the Romanian football league system and became a regular presence in Liga I, the country's top division. The club's greatest domestic achievement came in the 2012–13 season, when it finished as runners-up, earning qualification for European competition. In the following campaign, Pandurii reached the group stage of the 2013–14 UEFA Europa League.

Pandurii later entered a prolonged period of financial and administrative instability, which contributed to its relegation from Liga I and subsequent decline through the lower divisions. The club eventually entered bankruptcy proceedings in 2022, bringing an end to the activity of the historic senior team. In the following years, football in Târgu Jiu continued through other projects, most notably ACS Viitorul Târgu Jiu and, later, CSM Târgu Jiu. The latter established a senior football team in 2024 and quickly became the city's main representative side. After competing in Liga IV Gorj, CSM Târgu Jiu won the county championship in the 2024–25 season and secured promotion to Liga III by defeating CSM Lugoj 1–0 on aggregate in the promotion play-off, following a 0–0 draw away and a 1–0 home victory. The promotion marked the return of a team from Târgu Jiu to the national divisions after the disappearance of Pandurii and established CSM as the city's leading senior football club.

CSM Târgu Jiu competed in Liga III in the 2025–26 season and retained its place in the third tier for the following campaign. By the summer of 2026, the club had consolidated its position as the main football representative of Târgu Jiu. In the 2026–27 Cupa României, CSM entered the national phase in the first round and defeated Vulturii Fărcășești before progressing through the competition to the third round.

=== The Founding of CSM Târgu Jiu ===
After the dissolution of Pandurii, the community and local authorities desired to have a football club. To do so, CSM Târgu Jiu was founded.

The new club was established with the goal of to promoting local sports and providing opportunities for young players to develop their talents and continue their careers at a competitive level. The football team of CSM Târgu Jiu has played in local competitions.

=== Early years and progress (2024-present) ===
In the 2024–25 season, one year after its founding, CSM Târgu Jiu competed in Liga IV – Gorj County, winning all of its league matches under coach Mario Găman and the county championship. The team won in the county phase of the Cupa României, defeating Minerul Motru on penalties to complete a domestic double. Promotion to Liga III was secured after a 1–0 home win against CSM Lugoj in the play-off second leg, with Bebeto Lupuleț scoring the decisive goal on 29 June 2025. This marked the club’s entry into professional football.

== Awards and Honours ==
=== Leagues ===
Liga IV – Gorj County

- Winners (1): 2024–25

=== Cups ===
Cupa României – Gorj County

- Winners (1): 2024–25

Gorj Supercup

- Winners (1): 2025

== Players ==
=== First team squad ===
As of 1 September 2024

Note: Flags indicate national team as defined under FIFA eligibility rules; some limited exceptions apply. Players may hold more than one non-FIFA nationality.

No.	Pos.	Nation	Player
1	GK	ROU	Alexandru Oprița
2	DF	ROU	Elis Detculescu
3	DF	ROU	Lucian Marina
4	DF	ROU	Mihai Miculicean
5	DF	ROU	Antonio Surcel
6	DF	ROU	Ionuț Purdescu
7	MF	ROU	Adelin Pîrcălabu (Captain)
8	MF	ROU	Tudor Pătrășcoiu
9	FW	ROU	Mihnea Tutunaru
10	FW	ROU	Bebeto Lupuleț
11	MF	ROU	Albert Cărămidaru
12	GK	ROU	Ionuț Buță
14	MF	ROU	Ionuț Budilică
15	DF	ROU	Alexandru Lăpădat

No.	Pos.	Nation	Player
16	FW	ROU	Andrei Trancău
17	MF	ROU	Mario Țambu
18	DF	ROU	Eduard Trăistaru
19	DF	ROU	Sebastian Popescu
20	MF	ROU	Albert Filip
23	MF	ROU	Marian Habet
24	DF	ROU	Andrei Poenaru
25	MF	ROU	Gheorghe Ciortan
27	MF	ROU	Dragoș Blaj
28	DF	ROU	Robert Stancu
30	MF	ROU	Ovidiu Rasoveanu
82	MF	ROU	Andrei Rasoveanu
98	DF	ROU	Fabian Bărănescu

== Club officials ==
=== Board of directors ===
Role	Role
Owner	(Romania) Târgu Jiu Municipality
President	(Romania) Robert Bălăeț
Sporting director	(Romania) Alin Poenaru
Press Officer	(Romania) Cristi Constantinescu

=== Current technical staff ===
Role	Role
Manager	(Romania) Mario Găman
Assistant coaches	(Romania) Dan Staicu (Romania) Sorin Vintilescu (Romania) Florin Popete
Goalkeeping coach	(Romania) Dorin Hîrsu
Masseur	(Romania) Titi Balaci
Delegate	(Romania) Cristian Mihuț

== League history ==
See also Pandurii League history

Season	Tier	Division	Place	Notes	Cupa României
2026–27	3	Liga III	TBD		Third round
2025–26	3	Liga III (Series VI)	7th		
2024–25	4	Liga IV (GJ)	1st (C)	Promoted	(winners of county phase)
