= Valentin Buhăcianu =

Romanian professional footballer

Personal information
- Date of birth: 28 October 1993 (age 33)
- Place of birth: Vatra Dornei, Romania
- Height: 1.82 m (6 ft 0 in)
- Position: Forward

Youth career
- –2012: Dorna Vatra Dornei

Senior career*
Years	Team	Apps	(Gls)
2012–2013	Dorna Vatra Dornei		
2013–2016	Bucovina Pojorâta	30	(11)
2016–2017	Atletico Vaslui	15	(16)
2017–2018	Știința Miroslava	23	(5)
2018–2019	Aerostar Bacău	37	(25)
2019–2021	UTA Arad	58	(16)
2021–2023	Hermannstadt	41	(13)
2023–2025	Argeș Pitești	36	(4)
2025	→ AFC Câmpulung Muscel (loan)	0	(0)
2026	Șoimii Gura Humorului	0	(0)
- * Club domestic league appearances and goals as of 14 December 2024

Valentin Buhăcianu (born 28 October 1993) is a Romanian professional footballer who plays as a forward.

== Honours ==
Bucovina Pojorâta

- Liga III: 2014–15

UTA Arad

- Liga II: 2019–20

FC Argeş Piteşti

- Liga II: 2024–25

Individual

- Liga II top scorer: 2018–19 (25 goals)
