= Daniel Lung =

Romanian footballer

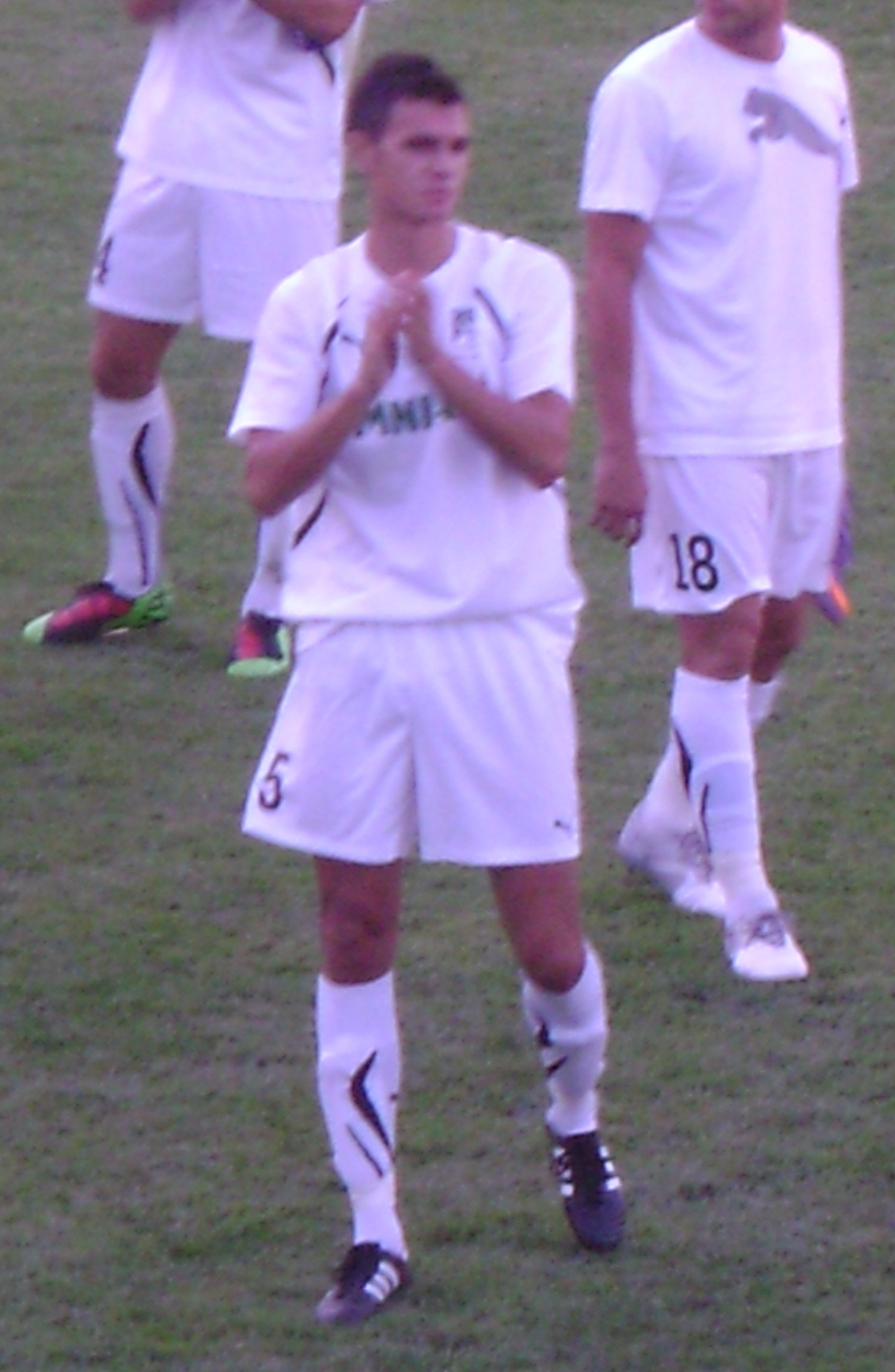

Personal information
- Full name: Daniel Cristian Lung
- Date of birth: 3 October 1987 (age 39)
- Place of birth: Satu Mare, Romania
- Height: 1.87 m (6 ft 2 in)
- Position: Centre back

Team information
- Current team: CS Dinamo București (team manager)

Youth career
- 1997–2005: Olimpia Satu Mare

Senior career*
Years	Team	Apps	(Gls)
2005–2006	Olimpia Satu Mare	5	(0)
2006–2013	Sportul Studențesc	131	(5)
2013–2014	Rapid București	30	(2)
2015–2016	Concordia Chiajna	3	(0)
2016	Academica Clinceni	11	(0)
2016–2017	Foresta Suceava	28	(1)
2017	Pandurii Târgu Jiu	19	(1)
2018–2019	Energeticianul	25	(0)
2019–2024	Metaloglobus București	60	(2)
Total		312	(11)

Managerial career
- 2024–: CS Dinamo București (team manager)
- * Club domestic league appearances and goals

Daniel Cristian Lung (born 3 Oct 1987) is a Romanian former professional footballer who played as a centre back, currently team manager at Liga II club CS Dinamo București.

== Honours ==
Șirineasa

- Liga III: 2017–18
