= Andrei Ludușan =

Romanian footballer

Personal information
- Full name: Ioan Andrei Ludușan
- Date of birth: 15 May 1996 (age 30)
- Place of birth: Târgu Mureș, Romania
- Height: 1.84 m (6 ft 0 in)
- Position: Forward

Youth career
- 2006–2011: Kinder Târgu Mureș
- 2011–2014: Gheorghe Hagi Academy
- 2013: → Steaua București (loan)
- 2014: Bihor Oradea

Senior career*
Years	Team	Apps	(Gls)
2014–2015	Bihor Oradea	6	(0)
2015–2017	Râmnicu Vâlcea	25	(5)
2016–2017	→ Olimpia Satu Mare (loan)	19	(2)
2017	CS Iernut	5	(1)
2018–2020	Luceafărul Oradea	31	(4)
2020–2021	Viitorul Târgu Jiu	9	(2)

International career^{‡}
2012–2013	Romania U-17	3	(1)
2015	Romania U-19	0	(0)
- * Club domestic league appearances and goals as of 8 December 2020 ‡ National team caps and goals as of 4 October 2015

Ioan Andrei Ludușan (born 15 May 1996) is a Romanian professional footballer who plays as a forward. Ludușan played in his career for other Liga II clubs such as: CSM Râmnicu Vâlcea, Olimpia Satu Mare or Luceafărul Oradea, among others.
