= Robert Bălăeț =

Romanian footballer (born 1974)

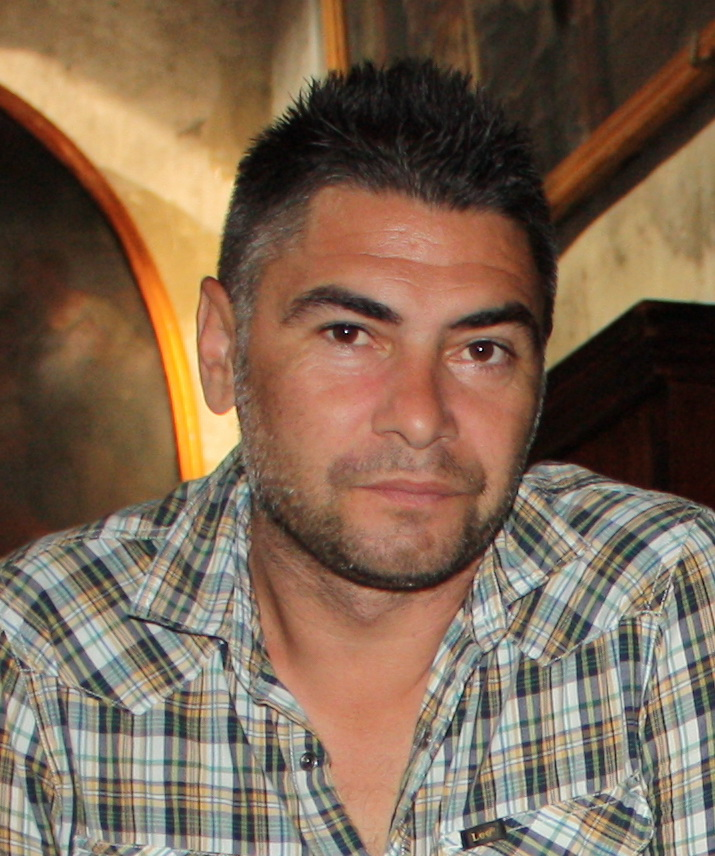

Personal information
- Date of birth: 18 November 1974 (age 51)
- Place of birth: Târgu Jiu, Romania
- Height: 1.86 m (6 ft 1 in)
- Position: Goalkeeper

Team information
- Current team: Târgu Jiu (chairman)

Senior career*
Years	Team	Apps	(Gls)
1993–2001	Petrolul Ţicleni	?	(?)
2001–2007	Pandurii Târgu Jiu	39	(1)
2008	→ Minerul Mehedinţi (loan)	?	(?)
2008–2009	Pandurii Târgu Jiu	3	(0)
- * Club domestic league appearances and goals as of 20 January 2018

Robert Bălăeț (born 18 November 1974) is a Romanian retired footballer who played as a goalkeeper.

After retiring from his career as a professional footballer, he worked as a sports director at CS Pandurii Lignitul Târgu Jiu between 2009 and 2015 and for another half year in 2017.

He is currently the director of the CSM Târgu Jiu, a position he has held since 20 March 2019.
