= Stadionul Cristinel Răducan =

Romanian stadium

- Interactive map of Stadionul Cristinel Răducan
- Address: Str. Castanilor
- Location: Târgu Cărbunești, Romania
- Coordinates: 44°57′45.5″N 23°31′02.4″E
- Owner: Town of Târgu Cărbunești
- Operator: Gilortul Târgu Cărbunești
- Capacity: 1,000 seated
- Surface: Grass

Construction
- Opened: 1970s
- Expanded: 2020

Tenant
- Gilortul Târgu Cărbunești (1976–present)

Stadionul Cristinel Răducan is a multi-purpose stadium in Târgu Cărbunești, Romania. It is currently used mostly for football matches, is the home ground of Gilortul Târgu Cărbunești and has a capacity of 1,000 seats.
