= Bogdan Moga =

Romanian footballer

Personal information
- Full name: Bogdan Mihai Moga
- Date of birth: 14 May 1995 (age 31)
- Place of birth: Târgu Mureș, Romania
- Height: 1.92 m (6 ft 4 in)
- Position: Goalkeeper

Team information
- Current team: MSE Târgu Mureș
- Number: 1

Youth career
- LPS Târgu Mureș
- ASA Târgu Mureș

Senior career*
Years	Team	Apps	(Gls)
2014–2017	ASA Târgu Mureș	17	(0)
2018	Pandurii Târgu Jiu	10	(0)
2018–2019	Luceafărul Oradea	29	(0)
2019–2021	Viitorul Târgu Jiu	20	(0)
2022–2023	FK Csíkszereda	2	(0)
2023	Minerul Ocna Dej	1	(0)
2024	Gloria Bistrița	1	(0)
2024–	MSE Târgu Mureș	0	(0)
- * Club domestic league appearances and goals as of 13:46, 8 November 2024 (UTC)

Bogdan Mihai Moga (born 14 May 1995) is a Romanian professional footballer who plays as a goalkeeper for MSE Târgu Mureș.

== Honours ==
ASA Târgu Mureș

- Romanian Supercup (1): 2015
