= Cojani =

Cojani may refer to:

- Cojani, a village in the Romanian town of Târgu Cărbunești
- Kozani, a Greek city known in Aromanian as Cojani
