= Samuel Falowo =

Nigerian footballer (born 2006)

Personal information
- Full name: Samuel Akinbola Falowo
- Date of birth: 1 October 2006 (age 20)
- Place of birth: Brooklyn, New York City
- Height: 1.75 m (5 ft 9 in)
- Position: Defensive midfielder

Team information
- Current team: CS Oasul 1969
- Number: 8

Youth career
- 2023-2024: Barca Residency
- 2024-2025: Rochester New York FC

Senior career*
Years	Team	Apps	(Gls)
2025	New York Braveheart		
2025-2026	CS Oașul 1969	24	
- * Club domestic league appearances and goals

Samuel Falowo (born 1 October 2006) is a professional footballer who plays as a defensive midfielder for CS Oașul 1969 in the Romanian 4th division. Born in United States of America, he desires to play for the Nigeria national team.

== Early life and education ==
Samuel Falowo was born on October 1, 2006, in Brooklyn, New York, USA, to Nigerian parents of Yoruba origin. He attended Barcelona Residency Academy in casa grande, Arizona.

== Career ==
Samuel Falowo made his senior debut in 2025, playing as a Central defensive midfielder for CS Oașul 1969 of the Romanian lower Division.
