= Ionuț Mihălăchioaie =

Romanian footballer

Personal information
- Date of birth: 31 January 1991 (age 35)
- Place of birth: Bacău, Romania
- Height: 1.77 m (5 ft 9 1/2 in)
- Position: Right back

Senior career*
Years	Team	Apps	(Gls)
2007–2012	FCM Bacău	96	(4)
2012–2013	Politehnica Iași	8	(1)
2013–2016	SC Bacău	81	(1)
2016–2017	Foresta Suceava	13	(1)
2017–2020	Aerostar Bacău	60	(0)

International career^{‡}
2010	Romania U-19		
- * Club domestic league appearances and goals as of 31 August 2020 ‡ National team caps and goals as of 25 January 2011

Ionuț Mihălăchioaie (born 31 January 1991) is a Romanian footballer, who plays as a right back.
