= Emil Szolomajer =

Romanian footballer

Personal information
- Full name: Emil Attila Szolomajer
- Date of birth: 24 January 1974 (age 52)
- Place of birth: Sighetu Marmației, Romania
- Height: 1.87 m (6 ft 1 1/2 in)
- Position: Goalkeeper

Youth career
- Maramureș Baia Mare

Senior career*
Years	Team	Apps	(Gls)
1994–2001	Baia Mare	89	(0)
2001–2003	Oașul Negrești	13	(0)
2003–2004	CSM Reșița	13	(0)
2004–2005	Auxerre Lugoj	?	(?)
2005–2010	Universitatea Cluj	51	(0)
2007–2008	→ Arieşul Turda (loan)	4	(0)
2008	Mechel Câmpia Turzii	10	(0)
2009	Seso Iara	?	(?)
Total		231	(0)

Managerial career
- 2013–2014: Universitatea Cluj (GK Coach)
- 2014: Rapid București (GK Coach)
- 2015–2016: Dunărea Călărași (GK Coach)
- 2016: Voluntari (GK Coach)
- 2017: Târgu Mureș (assistant)
- 2018: Șirineasa (GK Coach)
- 2018–2019: Poli Timișoara (GK Coach)
- 2019: Energeticianul (GK Coach)
- 2019: Energeticianul (caretaker)
- 2019: Energeticianul (GK Coach)
- * Club domestic league appearances and goals as of 15 April 2019

Emil Attila Szolomajer (born 24 January 1974) is a Romanian former football goalkeeper. In his career Szolomajer played for teams such as Baia Mare, CSM Reșița, and Universitatea Cluj. After retirement he started to work as a goalkeeping coach.

== Trivia ==
In Liga I, Szolomajer played 10 games for FC Baia Mare during the 1994–95 season, one of them as a substitute. In those 10 games, the opponents scored 40 goals against FC Baia Mare.
