= Florin Popete =

Romanian footballer

Personal information
- Full name: Florin Laurențiu Popete
- Date of birth: 27 December 1977 (age 48)
- Place of birth: Târgu-Jiu, România
- Height: 1.77 m (5 ft 10 in)
- Position: Right back

Team information
- Current team: Târgu Jiu (assistant)

Youth career
- Pandurii Târgu Jiu

Senior career*
Years	Team	Apps	(Gls)
1999–2001	Pandurii Târgu Jiu	25	(4)
2001–2003	Farul Constanța	37	(1)
2003–2010	Pandurii Târgu Jiu	172	(8)
2010	→ Târgu Mureş (loan)	3	(0)
2011	Pandurii Târgu Jiu	12	(0)
2011–2013	Pandurii II Târgu Jiu		
2019	Gilortul Târgu Cărbunești	7	(1)
2020–2021	Gilortul Târgu Cărbunești	1	(0)
Total		257	(14)

Managerial career
- 2014–2019: Pandurii Târgu Jiu (youth)
- 2020–2021: Gilortul Târgu Cărbunești
- 2021–2022: Pandurii Târgu Jiu (U19)
- 2022–2024: Târgu Jiu (U19)
- 2024–: Târgu Jiu (assistant)
- * Club domestic league appearances and goals as of 16:54, 28 December 2024 (UTC)

Florin Laurențiu Popete (born 27 December 1977) is a Romanian former professional football player who played as a right back for teams such as Pandurii Târgu Jiu, Farul Constanța or Gilortul Târgu Cărbunești, among others. Popete played almost all his career for the team from his hometown, Pandurii Târgu Jiu. After retirement, he started to work as a manager for Pandurii Târgu Jiu Football Academy.

== Honours ==
Pandurii Târgu Jiu

- Divizia C: 1999–2000
- Liga II: 2004–05

Gilortul Târgu Cărbunești

- Liga IV – Gorj County: 2018–19
