= Robert Vancea =

Romanian footballer

Personal information
- Full name: Robert Dumitru Vancea
- Date of birth: 28 September 1976 (age 50)
- Place of birth: Craiova, Romania
- Height: 1.79 m (5 ft 10 in)
- Position: Midfielder

Youth career
- Universitatea Craiova
- FC U Craiova

Senior career*
Years	Team	Apps	(Gls)
1994–1999	FC U Craiova	61	(1)
1995	→ Electroputere Craiova (loan)	6	(0)
1996–1997	→ Constructorul Craiova (loan)		
1999	JEF United Ichihara	12	(0)
2000	FC U Craiova	6	(0)
2000–2003	Extensiv Craiova	55	(1)
2003–2004	Poli AEK Timișoara	18	(0)
2004–2009	Pandurii Târgu Jiu	121	(3)
Total		279	(5)
- * Club domestic league appearances and goals as of 30 April 2019

Robert Dumitru Vancea (born 28 September 1976) is a Romanian former professional footballer who played as a midfielder for teams such as: FC U Craiova, JEF United Chiba, Extensiv Craiova and Pandurii Târgu Jiu, among others.

== Club statistics ==
Club performance			League		Cup		League Cup		Total	
Season	Club	League	Apps	Goals	Apps	Goals	Apps	Goals	Apps	Goals
Japan			League		Emperor's Cup		J.League Cup		Total	
1999	JEF United Ichihara	J1 League	12	0	1	0	0	0	13	0
Total			12	0	1	0	0	0	13	0

== Honours ==
=== Player ===
FC Universitatea Craiova

- Cupa României: Runner-up 1997–98

Pandurii Târgu Jiu

- Divizia B: Winner 2004–05
