= Vasile Lucian Pop =

Romanian footballer

Vasile Pop
Personal information
- Full name: Vasile Lucian Pop
- Date of birth: 4 November 1989 (age 37)
- Place of birth: Cluj-Napoca, Romania
- Height: 1.75 m (5 ft 9 in)
- Positions: Midfielder; forward

Team information
- Current team: Oașul Negrești (player-coach)
- Number: 10

Youth career
- Universitatea Cluj

Senior career*
Years	Team	Apps	(Gls)
2010–2012	Universitatea Cluj	0	(0)
2010–2011	→ Silvania Șimleu (loan)	7	(0)
2011–2012	→ FCMU Baia Mare (loan)	38	(4)
2013	Gloria Bistrița	4	(0)
2013	Allerheiligen	4	(0)
2013–2016	Baia Mare	30	(9)
2016–2017	Olimpia Satu Mare	34	(16)
2018–2019	Luceafărul Oradea	43	(15)
2019–2020	Viitorul Târgu Jiu	20	(5)
2020–2021	Minaur Baia Mare	16	(10)
2021–	Oașul Negrești	0	(0)

Managerial career
- 2021–2022: Energia Negrești
- 2023–: Oașul Negrești
- * Club domestic league appearances and goals as of 30 April 2021

Vasile Lucian Pop (born 4 November 1989) is a Romanian professional footballer who plays as a midfielder or forward for Oașul Negrești-Oaș in the Liga IV.

== Honours ==
Minaur Baia Mare

- Liga III: 2020–21
