= CS Gilortul Târgu Cărbunești =

Romanian football club

Gilortul Târgu Cărbunești
- Full name: Clubul Sportiv Gilortul; Târgu Cărbunești
- Nickname: Alb-albaștrii (The White-Blues)
- Short name: Gilortul
- Founded: 1 March 1976; 50 years ago
- Ground: Cristinel Răducan
- Capacity: 800
- Owner: Târgu Cărbunești Town
- Chairman: Alin Sandu
- Manager: Alexandru Avrămescu (caretaker)
- League: Liga IV
- 2025–26: Liga III, Seria VI, 12th (relegated)
Home colours	Away colours	Third colours

Clubul Sportiv Gilortul Târgu Cărbunești, commonly known as Gilortul Târgu Cărbunești, is a Romanian professional football club from Târgu Cărbunești, Gorj County, currently competes in the Liga IV, the 4th tier of the Romanian football.

== History ==
In the 1997–98 season, Gilortul, led from the bench by Cristinel Răducan, won the Divizia D – Gorj County, but lost the promotion play-off against Șoimii Pâncota, the winner of Divizia D – Arad County, 1–2 at Cetate Stadium in Deva. The squad was composed amongst others by Dan Nițu – Sârbulescu, Udrescu, Mihai Constantinescu, Nicolae, Gheorghe Bujor, Vâlceanu, Silviu Sporiș, Udrea, Dumitru Mogoșanu, Ionuț Zorlescu, Brănescu, Luță and N.Bilan.

Gilortul promoted to Divizia C at the end of the next season, after won again the county championship. The coach Cornel Tigveanu had at his disposal the following players: Sorin Bunea, Badalea, Sârbulescu, Gheorghe Bujor, Valentin Belu, Silviu Sporiș, Udrea, Ion Cănăvoiu, Vasile Luță, Ovidiu Aniniș, Constantin Luță, Ciortea, Daniel Stanciu, Eugen Coteț, Mitrofan, Brănescu and Florea. Also, the team managed to win the county phase of the Romanian Cup, defeating Vox Târgu Jiu 4–0 in the final.

Gilortul was reformed in the 2011–12 season in Liga V – Gorj County, the fifth tier of Romanian football league system and the second at the county level, earning promotion under coach Ion Rădulescu after finishing first in the East Series. In the 2012–13 season, the team performed strongly under Rădulescu, who left after the 19th round and was replaced by assistants Constantin Munteanu and Ciprian Dudău, finishing the season in 2nd place.

In the 2013–14 season, Gilortul, led by Sergiu Găman, won the Liga IV – Gorj County title but lost the promotion play-off to Liga III against Minerul Mehedinți, the Mehedinți County champions, 0–2 after extra time at 1 Mai Stadium in Slatina.

Gilortul, under Marius Ionel, captured the Gorj County championship for a second consecutive season but again fell short in the promotion play-off, losing 2–8 away and 1–3 at home to Cetate Deva, the Hunedoara County champions.

Led by Mihai Dinu, Gilortul won the 2015–16 season but missed promotion to the third division for the third consecutive time, losing the play-off to Hermannstadt, the Sibiu County champions. After a narrow 0–1 defeat at the Municipal Stadium in Sibiu, the white-and-blues suffered a heavy 1–5 loss at home in Târgu Cărbunești.

In 2016–17, Gilortul finished 3rd under Mihai Dinu, and in 2017–18 ended the season in 5th place under player-coach Alexandru Avrămescu.

Promotion to Liga III finally came at the end of 2018–19 under coach Octavian Iordache, winning the county title and the play-off against CS Strehaia, the Mehedinți County champions, overturning a 1–2 away defeat with a 3–0 home victory. The squad that earned promotion included Novabilschi, Buzurin, Dolcescu, Dăianu, Manole, Cocioabă, Almăjanu, Cârstoiu, Avrămescu (captain), Dumitru, Popete, Codin, Meliță, Mihăilescu, and Purece.

== Honours ==
Liga IV – Gorj County

- Winners (8): 1990–91, 1997–98, 1998–99, 2004–05, 2013–14, 2014–15, 2015–16, 2018–19
- Runners-up (1): 2012–13

Liga V – Gorj County

- Winners (1): 2011–12

Cupa României – Gorj County

- Winners (3): 1998–99, 2013–14, 2014–15
- Runners-up (1): 2012–13

== Players ==
=== First team squad ===
As of 10 September 2024

Note: Flags indicate national team as defined under FIFA eligibility rules; some limited exceptions apply. Players may hold more than one non-FIFA nationality.

No.	Pos.	Nation	Player
1	GK	ROU	Mihai Iuțalîm
3	DF	MDA	Cristian Martin
4	DF	ROU	Robert Dănescu
5	DF	ROU	Ionuț Mitrache
6	DF	ROU	Leonard Gheorghe
7	MF	ROU	Constantin Roncea
8	MF	ROU	Alexandru Avrămescu (Captain)
9	FW	ROU	Ionuț Gîlcescu
10	MF	ROU	Răzvan Vespe
11	MF	ROU	Dragoș Săulescu
12	GK	ROU	Luis Spînu

No.	Pos.	Nation	Player
15	DF	CMR	Ulrich Siewe
17	MF	ROU	Bogdan Oprișa (Vice-Captain)
18	MF	ROU	Eric Popescu
20	MF	ROU	Rareș Brujan
21	MF	ROU	Marius Miruță
26	MF	ROU	Patrick Rădulescu (on loan from CSU Craiova)
30	MF	ROU	Mario Urlan
80	MF	ROU	Paolo Viespe
90	MF	ROU	Andrei Lazăr
97	DF	ROU	Florin Marica
99	MF	ROU	Denis Bucur

=== Out on loan ===
Note: Flags indicate national team as defined under FIFA eligibility rules; some limited exceptions apply. Players may hold more than one non-FIFA nationality.

No. / Pos. / Nation / Player	No. / Pos. / Nation / Player}

== Club officials ==
=== Board of directors ===
Role	Role
Owner	(Romania) Târgu Cărbunești Town
President	(Romania) Alin Sandu
Vice-president	(Romania) Florin Haiducescu
Sporting director	(Romania) Mihai Dinu
Delegate	(Romania) Irinel Poșircă

=== Current technical staff ===
Role	Role
Manager	(Romania) Alexandru Avrămescu
Assistant manager	(Romania) Ionuț Gîlcescu
Club Doctor	(Romania) Mariana Tomulescu

== League and Cup history ==
Season	Tier	Division	Place	Notes	Cupa României
2025–26	3	Liga III (Seria VI)	TBD		
2024–25	3	Liga III (Seria VIII)	9th	Spared from (R)	Second round
2023–24	3	Liga III (Seria VII)	6th		First round
2022–23	3	Liga III (Seria VII)	3rd		Second round
2021–22	3	Liga III (Seria VII)	6th		Second round
2020–21	3	Liga III (Seria VII)	6th		First round
2019–20	3	Liga III (Seria IV)	16th		
2018–19	4	Liga IV (GJ)	1st (C)	Promoted	
2017–18	4	Liga IV (GJ)	5th		
2016–17	4	Liga IV (GJ)	3rd		

Season	Tier	Division	Place	Notes	Cupa României
2015–16	4	Liga IV (GJ)	1st (C)		First round
2014–15	4	Liga IV (GJ)	1st (C)		First round
2013–14	4	Liga IV (GJ)	1st (C)		
2012–13	4	Liga IV (GJ)	2nd		
2005–06	3	Divizia C (Seria VI)	12th	Relegated	
2004–05	4	Divizia D (GJ)	1st (C)	Promoted	
2002–03	2	Divizia B (Seria II)	15th	Relegated	
2001–02	3	Divizia C (Seria V)	2nd	Promoted	
2000–01	3	Divizia C (Seria V)	3rd		
1999–00	3	Divizia C (Seria V)	16th		
