= Gheorghe Poenaru =

Romanian footballer and manager

Personal information
- Date of birth: 1 November 1956 (age 70)
- Place of birth: Poiana, Romania
- Position: Midfielder

Senior career*
Years	Team	Apps	(Gls)
1972–1980	Partizanul Bacău		
1976–1977	→ Aripile Bacău (loan)		
1980–1982	Borzești		
1980–1992	Aripile Bacău		

Managerial career
- 1990–1992: Aripile Bacău
- 1992–1999: Petrolul Moinești
- 1999: FCM Bacău (caretaker)
- 1999–2001: FCM Bacău
- 2001: Petrolul Moinești
- 2002: FCM Bacău
- 2002–2003: Ceahlăul Piatra Neamț
- 2003: FC Onești
- 2003–2005: Laminorul Roman
- 2005–2006: CFR Pașcani
- 2007–2008: Jiul Petroșani
- 2008–2012: FCM Bacău
- 2012–2013: Petrotub Roman
- 2014–2016: SC Bacău (technical director)
- * Club domestic league appearances and goals

Gheorghe Poenaru (born 1 November 1956) is a Romanian former footballer and manager. As a footballer, Poenaru played mainly as a midfielder for Divizia B and Divizia C teams such as Partizanul Bacău, Aripile Bacău or CSM Borzești, all clubs based in his home county, Bacău.

Poenaru retired in 1992, and started his managerial career in 1990, as a player-manager at Aripile Bacău. Subsequently, he was one of the most important managers in the history of Petrolul Moinești, team which he promoted at the level of the second tier and maintained it there for next years. As a result, in 1999 he was promoted as manager of Divizia A club, FCM Bacău, club at which he spent most of his career as a manager. In the top-flight Poenaru also managed Ceahlăul Piatra Neamț and Jiul Petroșani; in the second tier FC Onești and Laminorul Roman. Jiul was the only team outside Moldavia that had Poenaru under contract.

Between 2014 and 2016, Poenaru was the technical director of SC Bacău. After SC Bacău relegation from Liga II, Poenaru retired from the manager career, also having some health problems related to the heart.

== Honours ==
=== Player ===
Partizanul Bacău

- Divizia D – Bacău County: Winner (1) 1973–74

Aripile Bacău

- Divizia D – Bacău County: Winner (1) 1976–77
- Divizia C: Winner (2) 1984–85, 1987–88

Borzești

- Divizia C: Winner (1) 1981–82

=== Manager ===
Petroul Moinești

- Divizia C: Winner (1) 1995–96
