= CS Aerostar Bacău =

Romanian football club

Aerostar Bacău
- Full name: Clubul Sportiv Aerostar Bacău
- Nicknames: Aviatorii (The Airmen); Galben-albaștrii (Yellow and Blues)
- Short name: Aerostar
- Founded: 1956; 70 years ago as Victoria Bacău; 1995; 31 years ago as Aerostar Bacău
- Ground: Aerostar
- Capacity: 1,500
- Owner: Aerostar SA
- General manager: Remus Pozînărea
- Manager: Andrei Întuneric
- League: Liga III
- 2025–26: Liga III, Seria I, 9th
- Website: http://cs.aerostar.ro/
Home colours	Away colours	Third colours

Clubul Sportiv Aerostar Bacău, commonly known as Aerostar Bacău or simply as Aerostar, is a Romanian professional football club from the city of Bacău, Bacău County, currently playing in the Liga III.

Founded in 1956 as Victoria Bacău, "the yellow and blues" are known as the team of the city's aeronautical manufacturing company. After the fall of communism, the country has undergone a series administrative changes, and in the early 1990s the company changed its name to Aerostar, a name which was also adopted by the football club. During the 1993–94 season, the club encountered serious financial problems that led to the exclusion from the Divizia C championship and bankruptcy. In the summer of 1995, the side was refounded with the same name of Aerostar Bacău and enrolled in the fourth division.

== History ==
Chart of yearly table positions of Aerostar Bacău in the national leagues.

=== First years, Aripile and the ascension (1956–1992) ===
The club was founded in 1956 as Victoria Bacău operating around the aircraft company from Bacău and played in the Bacău Regional and County championships.

Renamed as Aripile Bacău in 1973, the club promoted for the first time in Divizia C at the end of the 1976–77 season, winning the Bacău County championship and the promotion play-off against Rapid Panciu 3–2 on aggregate, being assigned to the second series. The team obtained only a 14th place out of 16 in the first season and a 15th place at the end of the second, being relegated to the fourth tier of the Romanian football league system. After one season of absence Aripile promoted back to Divizia C and changed its name in Victoria IRA Bacău.

As Victoria IRA, the results started to appear: 1980–81 – 6th and 1981–82 – 5th. In the summer of 1982 the club ownership decided to change the team's name back to the old one, Aripile Bacău. A fantastic season followed, in which Aripile fought for promotion until the last rounds, finishing 2nd, at 5 points behind the local rival, Partizanul Bacău and two points over another team from Bacău County, Petrolul Moinești. In the next season the Airmen were even closer to the goal of promotion, being separated from the leader, FEPA 74 Bârlad, by only one point.

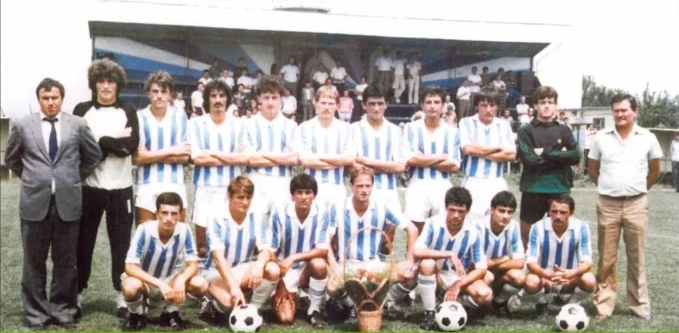
Aripile Bacău 1985 squad.

Finally, the Yellow and Blues achieved their first promotion to Divizia B at the end of the 1984–85 season, finishing in 1st place ahead of Mecanica Vaslui. Coached by Mircea Nedelcu, the squad comprised Iliuță, Frunză, Poenaru, Ciudin, Cătineanu, Chiriac, Gh. Munteanu, David, Nițoi, Florian, Moldoveanu, Chitic, Grigoraș (25 goals), Scînteie, Cotan, and Dragomir.

The first season in the Divizia B was ended with a well-deserved salvation from relegation after a tough battle with teams such as: Metalul Plopeni, Dunărea Călărași or Chimia Fălticeni. At the end of the season the club changed again its name, this time in Aripile Victoria Bacău, a mix between the two previous names: Aripile Bacău and Victoria IRA Bacău. The club relegated at the end of the season as the first one placed below the red line, at only one point from the first safe place, occupied by CS Botoșani.

Back in the third tier, the Airmen turned out to be a very good team, finishing with nine points over the same Mecanica Vaslui, a team that also lost the promotion battle in front of Aripile, back in 1985. The team coached by Mircea Nedelcu was composed of Iliuță, Ionică, Poenaru, Cărpuci, Pitica, Ciudin, Alistar, Gh. Munteanu, Ghioane, D. Manea, Ursică, Bărbieru, Urdaru, Manase, Florian, Popa, Trofin, Bondor, Bîșcă, Grigoraș (22 goals), and Firici.

In the summer of 1988, with the occasion of promotion, Aripile Victoria became again just Aripile and finished on the 13th place, at only one point from the relegation zone where were the old rivals from Metalul Plopeni and FEPA 74. The next season, 1989–90 was the best in the history of the club which achieved an unexpected 8th place, being situated over teams such as: Foresta Fălticeni, Poiana Câmpina or Ceahlăul Piatra Neamț, among others. After the Romanian Revolution of 1990 the aeronautical company and implicitly the team have been affected by disorganization from the leadership of public institutions and followed two disappointing rankings: 1990–91 – 13th and 1991–92 – 16th, the last result meaning also the relegation to the third division.

=== Aerostar, a classic of Liga III (1992–present) ===
A notable event occurred in the summer of 1992, when the club changed its name in Aerostar Bacău, change that was in fact a normal move, after the parent company also changed its name in Aerostar SA. At the end of the 1992–93 season the yellow and blues finished only 4th, after Constructorul Iași, Mureșul Toplița and Harghita Odorheiu Secuiesc and nothing announced at the time the disaster that will destroy the club during the 1993–94 season, when due to financial problems the club was excluded from Divizia C, being subsequently dissolved. After one year of inactivity the club was refounded with the same name of Aerostar Bacău, in the summer of 1995. "The Airmen" were enrolled in the Divizia D, having in the lead also a new president, in the person of Doru Damaschin. But the return of Aerostar in the national football was difficult compared to other clubs, after five tough years spent at the county level, the team from Bacău promoted back to Divizia C at the end of the 1998–99 season.

Returned to the third tier, Aerostar never relegated again, but also has failed to promote in the second league for the next 18 years. In this period the club obtained better or less good results: 2nd (2007–08), 3rd (1999–2000, 2003–04, 2004–05), 4th (2005–06, 2014–15, 2016–17), 5th (2006–07), 6th (2011–12), 7th (2001–02, 2008–09, 2015–16), 9th (2000–01, 2002–03, 2012–13), 10th (2010–11), 11th (2013–14) and 12th (2009–10).

In the summer of 2017 due to the lack of strong football clubs in the city fact owed to the dissolution of the most important club, FCM Bacău, in the summer of 2014, the relegation of SC Bacău at the end of the 2016–17 season and also to the disappearance of other clubs such as Letea, Pambac or Willy, Aerostar has also received financial support from the Municipality of Bacău in order to reach the promotion to the second tier. Cristian Popovici was chosen to be the new manager of the team and important players such as: Ionuț Mihălăchioaie and Cătălin Vraciu signed contracts with "the Airmen". The promotion battle was a very tough one and went to the last rounds when Aerostar won 1–0 against Oțelul Galați and assured its promotion in front of "the Steelworkers" and in front of FK Miercurea Ciuc. Therefore, Aerostar promoted back to Liga II after 26 years of absence and 18 years after its return in the Liga III, in 1999. This promotion came as a mouth of oxygen for the football from Bacău and Bacău County at a time when Aerostar has come to be the only team that represent the city and the county in the first three leagues and at a time when the Municipal Stadium has become a ruin.

Chronology of names
Period	Name
1956–1973	Victoria Bacău
1973–1980	Aripile Bacău
1980–1982	Victoria IRA Bacău
1982–1986	Aripile Bacău
1986–1988	Aripile Victoria Bacău
1988–1992	Aripile Bacău
1992–present	Aerostar Bacău

== Honours ==
Liga III

- Winners (4): 1984–85, 1987–88, 2017–18, 2019–20
- Runners-up (3): 1982–83, 1983–84, 2007–08

Liga IV – Bacău County

- Winners (3): 1976–77, 1979–80, 1998–99

== Players ==
=== First team squad ===
As of 10 September 2024

Note: Flags indicate national team as defined under FIFA eligibility rules; some limited exceptions apply. Players may hold more than one non-FIFA nationality.

No.	Pos.	Nation	Player
1	GK	ROU	Ovidiu Mocanu
3	MF	ROU	Cătălin Aeroaiei
6	DF	ROU	Mario Ganea
7	MF	ROU	Vasile Padovei
8	MF	ROU	Andrei Juncu
9	FW	ROU	Alexandru Băisan
10	MF	ROU	Marius Matei
11	MF	ROU	Nicolas Constantinescu
13	FW	ROU	Alexandru Cătău
16	MF	ROU	Vlăduț Bălășel
17	MF	ROU	George Paveliuc

No.	Pos.	Nation	Player
18	MF	ROU	Ianis Huiban
19	MF	ROU	Robert Necula
20	DF	ROU	Marius Telcean
21	DF	ROU	Antonio Acatrinei
22	DF	ROU	Marian Prențu (Captain)
23	DF	ROU	Alexandru Benchea
26	DF	ROU	Răzvan Tilibașa
29	DF	ROU	Tudor Antohi
30	GK	ROU	Andrei Tancău
33	MF	ROU	Alexandru Savin
77	MF	ROU	Alessandro Bobârnac

=== Out on loan ===
Note: Flags indicate national team as defined under FIFA eligibility rules; some limited exceptions apply. Players may hold more than one non-FIFA nationality.

No. / Pos. / Nation / Player	No. / Pos. / Nation / Player

== Club officials ==
=== Board of directors ===
Role	Name
Owner	(Romania) Aerostar SA
President	(Romania) Doru Damaschin
General manager	(Romania) Remus Pozînărea
Sporting director	(Romania) Valerian Voicu
Youth Center Manager	(Romania) Eusebiu Nica
Secretary	(Romania) Dan Flenchea

=== Current technical staff ===
Role	Name
Manager	(Romania) Andrei Întuneric
Assistant manager	(Romania) Andrei Vatră
Goalkeeping coach	(Romania) Adrian Iosub
Club Doctor	(Romania) Marius Kovács
Physiotherapist	(Romania) Constantin Sdrobiș
Masseur	(Romania) Florin Metanie

== League and Cup history ==
Season	Tier	Division	Place	Notes	Cupa României
2025–26	3	Liga III (Seria I)	TBD		
2024–25	3	Liga III (Seria II)	4th		
2023–24	3	Liga III (Seria I)	7th		
2022–23	3	Liga III (Seria II)	4th		
2021–22	3	Liga III (Seria II)	3rd		
2020–21	2	Liga II	20th	Relegated	Third Round
2019–20	3	Liga III (Seria I)	1st (C)	Promoted	Fourth Round
2018–19	2	Liga II	17th	Relegated	Fourth Round
2017–18	3	Liga III (Seria I)	1st (C)	Promoted	Round of 32
2016–17	3	Liga III (Seria I)	4th		Fourth Round
2015–16	3	Liga III (Seria I)	7th		Third Round
2014–15	3	Liga III (Seria I)	4th		Round of 32
2013–14	3	Liga III (Seria I)	11th		Second Round
2012–13	3	Liga III (Seria I)	9th		Third Round
2011–12	3	Liga III (Seria I)	6th		First Round
2010–11	3	Liga III (Seria I)	10th		First Round
2009–10	3	Liga III (Seria I)	12th		First Round

Season	Tier	Division	Place	Notes	Cupa României
2008–09	3	Liga III (Seria I)	7th		
2007–08	3	Liga III (Seria I)	2nd		
2006–07	3	Liga III (Seria I)	5th		
2005–06	3	Divizia C (Seria I)	4th		
2004–05	3	Divizia C (Seria I)	3rd		
2003–04	3	Divizia C (Seria II)	3rd		
2002–03	3	Divizia C (Seria I)	9th		
2001–02	3	Divizia C (Seria I)	7th		
2000–01	3	Divizia C (Seria II)	9th		
1999–00	3	Divizia C (Seria I)	3rd		
1993–94	3	Divizia C (Seria I)	20th	Relegated	
1992–93	3	Divizia C (Seria I)	4th		
1991–92	2	Divizia B (Seria III)	16th	Relegated	
1990–91	2	Divizia B (Seria I)	13th		
1989–90	2	Divizia B (Seria I)	8th		
1988–89	2	Divizia B (Seria I)	13th		

== Notable former players ==
- (Romania) Petre Grigoraș
- (Romania) Gheorghe Poenaru
- (Romania) Daniel Scînteie

== Notable former managers ==
- (Romania) Gheorghe Poenaru (1990–1992)
- (Romania) Cristian Popovici (2002–2004)
- (Romania) Costel Câmpeanu (2005–2006)
- (Romania) Constantin Ilie (2015)
- (Romania) Cristian Popovici (2017–2018)
- (Romania) Florin Bratu (2018–2019)
- (Romania) Cristian Lupuț (2020)
