= Constantina Diță-Tomescu Stadium =

Romanian stadium

Constantina Diță Stadium
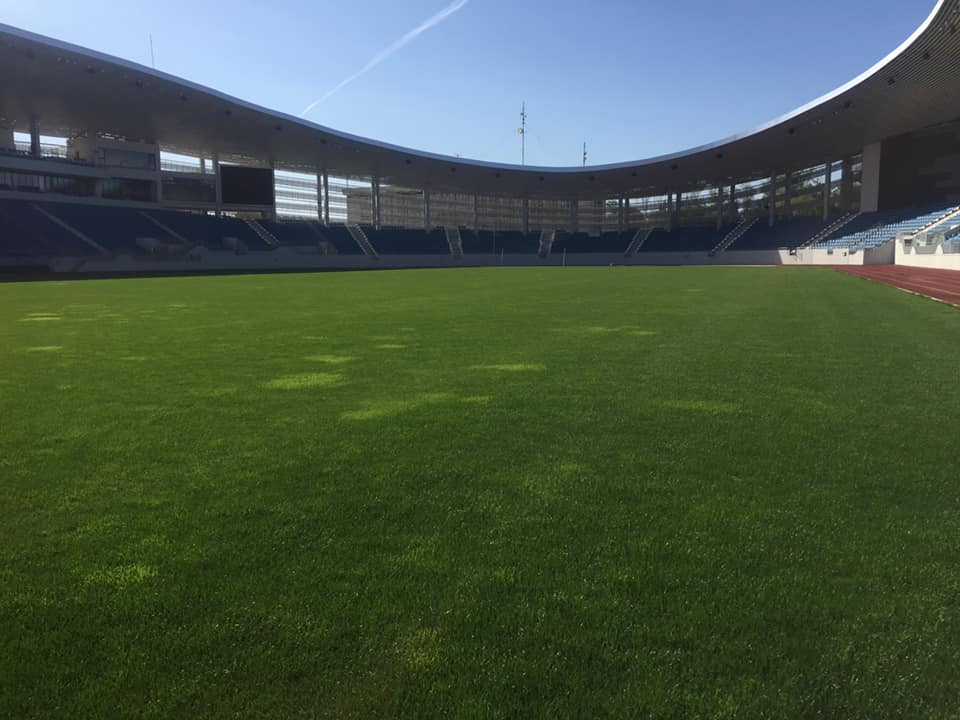
- UEFA
- Interactive map of Constantina Diță Stadium
- Address: 6 Constantin Brâncuși Blvd
- Location: Târgu Jiu, Romania
- Coordinates: 45°02′37.10″N 23°16′12.20″E
- Owner: Municipality of Târgu Jiu
- Operator: CSM Târgu Jiu
- Capacity: 12,518
- Surface: Grass

Construction
- Opened: 25 October 2019
- Cost: €28,000,000
- Main contractor: ACI Cluj

Tenants
- Pandurii Târgu Jiu (2019–2022); Viitorul Pandurii Târgu Jiu (2019–2024); CSM Târgu Jiu (2024–present)

The Constantina Diță-Tomescu Municipal Stadium is a multi-purpose stadium in Târgu Jiu, Romania. It serves as the home ground of CSM Târgu Jiu. The facility can also be used for a variety of other activities such as track and field and concerts.

The stadium replaced the former Stadionul Tudor Vladimirescu, being named after Wallachian hero Tudor Vladimirescu.

It was opened on 25 October 2019 when Gorj County native Constantina Diță cut the ribbon on new stadium.

In December 2022, the municipality of Târgu Jiu made the decision to rename the stadium, choosing the best performing athlete of the city in the last 100 years - Constantina Diță.

== See also ==
- List of football stadiums in Romania
