= 2017–18 Liga III =

Liga III
- Season: 2017–18
- Promoted: Aerostar Bacău; Farul Constanța; Petrolul Ploiești; Șirineasa; Universitatea Cluj
- Relegated: Sportul Chiscani; CSM Pașcani; CS Iernut; Viitorul Domnești; Internaţional Băleşti; Delta Dobrogea Tulcea; Unirea Dej; Avântul Valea Mărului; Victoria Traian; Urban Titu; NMM Becicherecu Mic; Viitorul Ghimbav; Metalosport Galați
- Matches played: 967
- Goals scored: 3,348 (3.46 per match)
- Top goalscorer: Cătălin Vraciu (29) (Aerostar Bacău)
- Biggest home win: KSE 17-0 Metalosport
- Biggest away win: Metalosport 0-11 Liești
- Highest scoring: KSE 17-0 Metalosport; Național 16-1 NMM
- Longest winning run: 12 matches: Universitatea Cluj
- Longest unbeaten run: 28 matches: Șirineasa
- Longest winless run: 27 matches: Metalosport Galați
- Longest losing run: 27 matches: Metalosport Galați
- All statistics correct as of 27 May 2018.

The 2017–18 Liga III is the 62nd season of the Liga III, the third tier of the Romanian football league system. The season began on 25 August 2017 and ended on 27 May 2018.

== Team changes ==
=== To Liga III ===
Promoted from Liga IV

- ACS Ghiroda
- Agricola Borcea
- Bucovina Rădăuți
- CSM Focșani
- Farul Constanța
- FC Avrig
- Internațional Bălești
- KSE Târgu Secuiesc
- Metalul Buzău
- Oțelul Galați
- Petrolul Ploiești
- Progresul Spartac București
- Sănătatea Darabani
- Șoimii Lipova
- Unirea Tășnad
- Universitatea Cluj
- Victoria Traian
- Viitorul Ghimbav
- Voința Saelele

Relegated from Liga II

- —

=== From Liga III ===
Relegated to Liga IV

- Atletico Vaslui
- SC Bacău
- Petrolistul Boldești
- Arsenal Malu
- CS Podari
- UTA II Arad
- ASA II Târgu Mureș
- CS Oşorhei
- Recolta Dorolț
- FC Bistrița

Promoted to Liga II

- Știința Miroslava
- Metaloglobus București
- SCM Pitești
- Ripensia Timișoara
- Hermannstadt

=== Teams spared from relegation ===
Metalul Reșița was spared from relegation to Liga III due to withdrawal of Brașov from Liga II.

Sportul Chiscani, Urban Titu, CS Șirineasa and Nuova Mama Mia Becicherecu Mic were spared from relegation to Liga IV due to lack of teams in Liga III.

=== Excluded teams ===
After the end of the last season, Râmnicu Vâlcea, Unirea Tărlungeni, Berceni, Șoimii Pâncota were dissolved.

Dinamo II București, Pandurii II Târgu Jiu and Poli II Timișoara withdrew and then were dissolved.

FC Milcov, Șurianu Sebeș, Viitorul Ulmeni, FC Zalău, Unirea Jucu and Viitorul II Constanța withdrew from Liga III.

=== Other teams ===
Hermannstadt enrolled in Liga III its second team.

CFR II Cluj, CFR Cluj's second team was also enrolled in Liga III.

CNP Timișoara received the permission to enroll in Liga III, due to the excellent results recorded in the youth championships.

=== Renamed teams ===
Voința Saelele was moved from Saelele to Turnu Măgurele and renamed as Voința Turnu Măgurele.

Olimpia Râmnicu Sărat was renamed as CSM Râmnicu Sărat.

== League tables ==
=== Seria I ===
Pos	Team	Pld	W	D	L	GF	GA	GD	Pts	Promotion or relegation
1	Aerostar Bacău (C, P)	28	21	5	2	80	20	+60	68	Promotion to Liga II
2	Miercurea Ciuc	28	20	6	2	74	25	+49	66	
3	Oțelul Galați	28	17	9	2	55	15	+40	60	
4	Roman	28	14	4	10	60	41	+19	46	
5	Bucovina Rădăuți	28	13	6	9	41	24	+17	45	
6	Olimpic Cetate Râșnov	28	12	8	8	41	28	+13	44 (Note: 1. OLI 10P.; 2. HĂR 4P.; 3. LIE 3P.)	
7	Hărman	28	13	5	10	55	31	+24	44	
8	Sporting Liești	28	13	5	10	48	35	+13	44	
9	KSE Târgu Secuiesc	28	12	6	10	69	45	+24	42	
10	Focșani	28	11	8	9	47	36	+11	41	
11	Odorheiu Secuiesc	28	10	3	15	39	48	−9	33	
12	Sănătatea Darabani (O)	28	8	6	14	41	52	−11	30	Possible relegation to Liga IV
13	Pașcani (R)	28	6	2	20	30	75	−45	20	Relegation to Liga IV
14	Avântul Valea Mărului (Note: Avântul Valea Mărului withdrew from the championship during the winter break and lost all the matches from the second part with 0-3.) (R)	27	2	1	24	26	79	−53	7	Relegation to Liga IV
15	Metalosport Galați (Note: Metalosport Galați were deducted 12 points for unpaid debts, was excluded from the championship and lost all the matches from the second part by forfeit.) (R)	27	0	0	27	2	154	−152	−12	Relegation to Liga IV

Source: FRF (in Romanian)
Rules for classification: 1st points; 2nd head-to-head points; 3rd head-to-head goal difference; 4th head-to-head goals scored; 5th head-to-head away goals scored; 6th goal difference; 7th number of goals scored
(C) Champions; (O) Play-off winners; (P) Promoted; (R) Relegated

=== Seria II ===
Pos	Team	Pld	W	D	L	GF	GA	GD	Pts	Promotion or relegation
1	Farul Constanța (C, P)	26	21	4	1	93	26	+67	67	Promotion to Liga II
2	Progresul Spartac București	26	19	5	2	77	28	+49	62	
3	Unirea Slobozia	26	18	3	5	93	36	+57	57	
4	Axiopolis Cernavodă	26	16	4	6	65	27	+38	52	
5	Metalul Buzău	26	15	5	6	47	25	+22	50	
6	Steaua II București	26	14	5	7	75	38	+37	47	
7	Voluntari II	26	12	7	7	59	33	+26	43	
8	Înainte Modelu	26	13	1	12	70	57	+13	40	
9	Râmnicu Sărat	26	9	4	13	34	56	−22	31	
10	Oltenița	26	4	9	13	37	58	−21	21	
11	Agricola Borcea	26	5	3	18	42	79	−37	18 (Note: SPO-AGR 0-2; AGR-SPO 3-1)	
12	Sportul Chiscani (R)	26	5	3	18	22	80	−58	18	Possible relegation to Liga IV
13	Delta Dobrogea Tulcea (R)	26	3	1	22	28	97	−69	10	Relegation to Liga IV
14	Victoria Traian (R)	26	1	0	25	17	119	−102	3	Relegation to Liga IV

Source: FRF (in Romanian)
Rules for classification: 1st points; 2nd head-to-head points; 3rd head-to-head goal difference; 4th head-to-head goals scored; 5th head-to-head away goals scored; 6th goal difference; 7th number of goals scored
(C) Champions; (P) Promoted; (R) Relegated

=== Seria III ===
Pos	Team	Pld	W	D	L	GF	GA	GD	Pts	Promotion or relegation
1	Petrolul Ploiești (C, P)	24	19	3	2	57	18	+39	60	Promotion to Liga II
2	Alexandria	24	17	5	2	59	16	+43	56 (Note: ALX-VOI 1-1; VOI-ALX 2-2)	
3	Voința Turnu Măgurele	24	17	5	2	51	15	+36	56	
4	Astra II	24	12	6	6	33	18	+15	42	
5	Popești-Leordeni	24	11	2	11	47	38	+9	35	
6	Flacăra Moreni	24	10	3	11	39	38	+1	33	
7	Tunari	24	9	5	10	38	30	+8	32	
8	Atletic Bradu	24	7	5	12	28	46	−18	26	
9	Concordia II Chiajna	24	7	4	13	33	41	−8	25	
10	Aninoasa	24	5	5	14	30	47	−17	20 (Note: 1. ANI 10P.; 2. MIO 4P.; 3. SRO 3P.)	
11	Mioveni II	24	6	2	16	21	53	−32	20	
12	Sporting Roșiori (O)	24	6	2	16	24	42	−18	20	Possible relegation to Liga IV
13	Viitorul Domnești (R)	24	5	3	16	25	83	−58	18	Relegation to Liga IV
14	Urban Titu (Note: Urban Titu withdrew from the championship after round 5 and all their results were canceled.) (R)	0	0	0	0	0	0	0	0	Relegation to Liga IV

Source: FRF (in Romanian)
Rules for classification: 1st points; 2nd head-to-head points; 3rd head-to-head goal difference; 4th head-to-head goals scored; 5th head-to-head away goals scored; 6th goal difference; 7th number of goals scored
(C) Champions; (O) Play-off winners; (P) Promoted; (R) Relegated

=== Seria IV ===
Pos	Team	Pld	W	D	L	GF	GA	GD	Pts	Promotion or relegation
1	Șirineasa (C, P)	26	20	6	0	70	14	+56	66	Promotion to Liga II
2	CSMȘ Reșița	26	17	6	3	64	18	+46	57	
3	Național Sebiș	26	17	5	4	67	22	+45	56	
4	Lugoj	26	16	5	5	61	33	+28	53	
5	CS U II Craiova	26	13	3	10	55	34	+21	42	
6	Șoimii Lipova	26	10	7	9	41	38	+3	37	
7	Filiași	26	9	9	8	36	30	+6	36	
8	Cetate Deva	26	8	8	10	44	38	+6	32 (Note: CET-GHI 2-0; GHI-CET 1-1)	
9	Ghiroda	26	9	5	12	40	41	−1	32	
10	Gloria Lunca-Teuz Cermei	26	7	7	12	44	56	−12	28	
11	Hermannstadt II	26	7	6	13	42	61	−19	27	
12	Millenium Giarmata (O)	26	7	5	14	45	58	−13	26	Possible relegation to Liga IV
13	Internaţional Bălești (R)	26	3	4	19	19	63	−44	13	Relegation to Liga IV
14	Nuova Mama Mia Becicherecu Mic (Note: Nuova Mama Mia Becicherecu Mic were deducted 16 points for unpaid debts.) (R)	26	0	2	24	8	130	−122	−14	Relegation to Liga IV
—	CNP Timișoara (Note: CNP Timișoara is the squad of the National Training Center of the Romanian Football Federation and is not eligible to be promoted to the Liga II or relegated to the Liga IV. The team's results don't count in the final standings.)	28	11	2	15	41	61	−20	35	Not eligible to be promoted or relegated

Source: FRF (in Romanian)
Rules for classification: 1st points; 2nd head-to-head points; 3rd head-to-head goal difference; 4th head-to-head goals scored; 5th head-to-head away goals scored; 6th goal difference; 7th number of goals scored
(C) Champions; (O) Play-off winners; (P) Promoted; (R) Relegated

=== Seria V ===
Pos	Team	Pld	W	D	L	GF	GA	GD	Pts	Promotion or relegation
1	Universitatea Cluj (C, P)	28	24	2	2	88	16	+72	74	Promotion to Liga II
2	Comuna Recea	28	17	5	6	56	25	+31	56	
3	Performanța Ighiu	28	16	6	6	56	32	+24	54	
4	Metalurgistul Cugir	28	15	6	7	47	30	+17	51	
5	Industria Galda	28	15	5	8	47	37	+10	50	
6	Unirea Alba Iulia	28	14	6	8	45	34	+11	48	
7	Sănătatea Cluj	28	12	9	7	49	25	+24	45	
8	CFR Cluj-Napoca II	28	13	5	10	53	36	+17	44	
9	Unirea Tășnad	28	12	4	12	40	48	−8	40	
10	Avântul Reghin	28	10	5	13	36	43	−7	35	
11	Avrig	28	8	9	11	37	42	−5	33	
12	Gaz Metan II Mediaș (O)	28	6	5	17	28	60	−32	23	Possible relegation to Liga IV
13	Iernut (R)	28	4	7	17	39	73	−34	19	Relegation to Liga IV
14	Unirea Dej (R)	28	5	2	21	21	55	−34	17	Relegation to Liga IV
15	Viitorul Ghimbav (Note: Viitorul Ghimbav withdrew from the championship during the winter break and lost all the matches from the second part with 0-3.) (R)	28	1	0	27	15	101	−86	3	Relegation to Liga IV

Source: FRF (in Romanian)
Rules for classification: 1st points; 2nd head-to-head points; 3rd head-to-head goal difference; 4th head-to-head goals scored; 5th head-to-head away goals scored; 6th goal difference; 7th number of goals scored
(C) Champions; (O) Play-off winners; (P) Promoted; (R) Relegated

== Possible relegation ==
At the end of the championship a special table will be made between 12th places from the 5 series. The last team in this table will relegate also in Liga IV. In this table 12th place teams are included without the points obtained against teams that relegated in their series.

Pos	Team	Pld	W	D	L	GF	GA	GD	Pts	Relegation
1	Millenium Giarmata	22	5	4	13	38	55	−17	19	
2	Sporting Roșiori	22	5	2	15	18	35	−17	17	
3	Sănătatea Darabani	22	4	4	14	25	49	−24	16	
4	Gaz Metan II Mediaș	22	2	5	15	15	52	−37	11	
5	Sportul Chiscani (R)	22	2	3	17	13	72	−59	9	Relegation to Liga IV

Source: FRF (in Romanian)
Rules for classification: 1st points; 2nd head-to-head points; 3rd head-to-head goal difference; 4th head-to-head goals scored; 5th head-to-head away goals scored; 6th goal difference; 7th number of goals scored
(R) Relegated
