= Cătălin Vraciu =

Romanian footballer

Personal information
- Full name: Cătălin Ciprian Vraciu
- Date of birth: 21 January 1989 (age 37)
- Place of birth: Bacău, Romania
- Height: 1.85 m (6 ft 1 in)
- Positions: Forward; midfielder

Youth career
- 1999–2006: FCM Bacău

Senior career*
Years	Team	Apps	(Gls)
2006–2012	FCM Bacău	128	(39)
2012–2014	Botoșani	36	(7)
2014	→ Dunărea Galați (loan)	17	(1)
2014–2016	SC Bacău	59	(30)
2016	Poli Timișoara	5	(0)
2017	Poli II Timișoara	2	(1)
2017	Foresta Suceava	13	(4)
2017–2023	Aerostar Bacău	140	(95)
2023–2024	FC Bacău	19	(5)
Total		419	(182)
- * Club domestic league appearances and goals as of 13:11, 31 December 2024 (UTC)

Cătălin Ciprian Vraciu (born 21 January 1989) is a Romanian former footballer who played as a forward or midfielder for teams such as FCM Bacău, FC Botoșani, SC Bacău, Aerostar Bacău or FC Bacău, among others.

== Club career ==
He made his debut on the professional league level in the Liga I for Botoșani on 21 July 2013 as a starter in a game against CFR Cluj.

== Honours ==
FCM Bacău

- Liga III: 2010–11

FC Botoșani

- Liga II: 2012–13

Aerostar Bacău

- Liga III: 2017–18, 2019–20
