= Târgu Cărbunești =

- Town
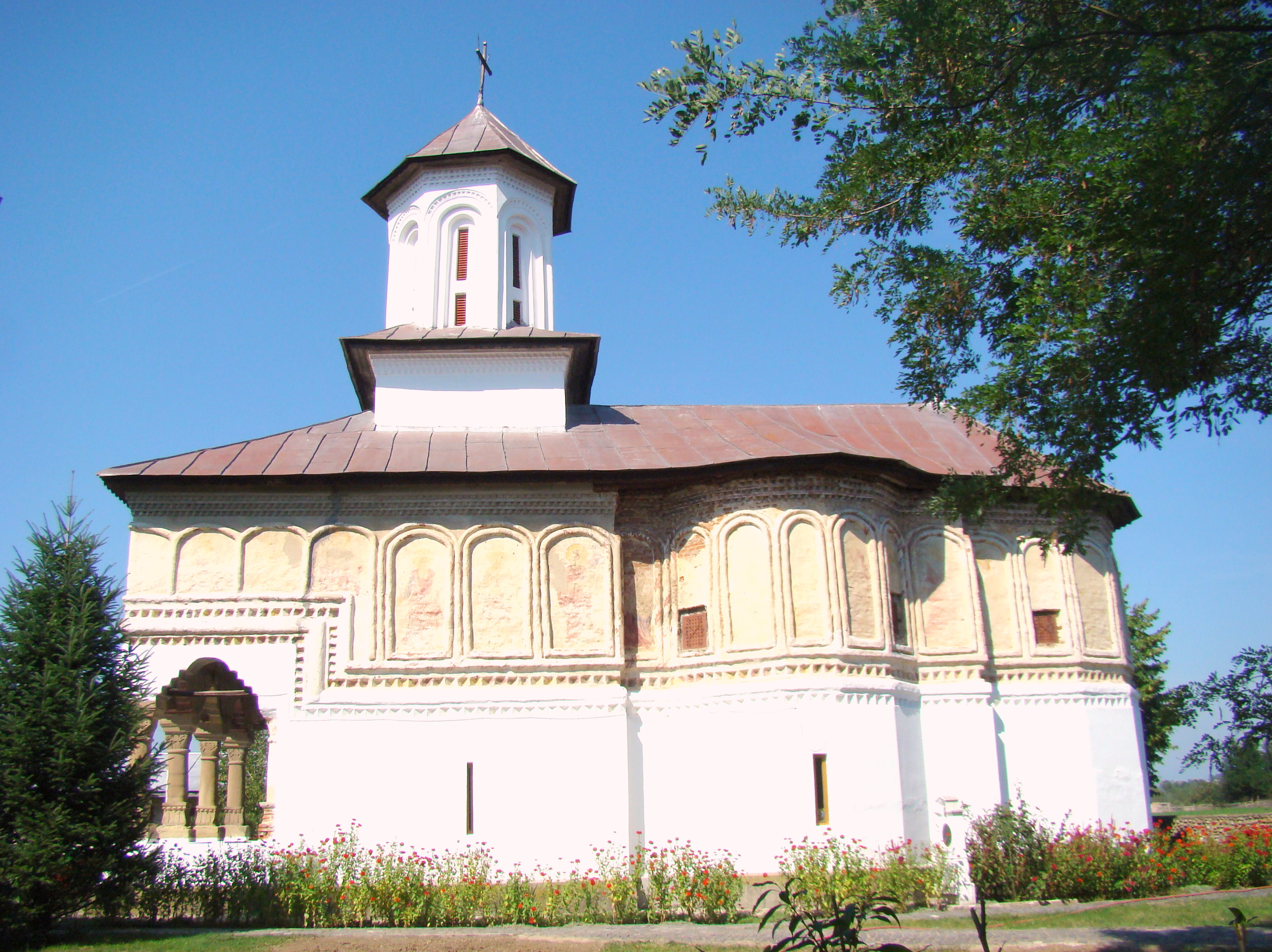
- Cămărășeasca Monastery

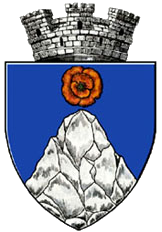
- Coat of arms

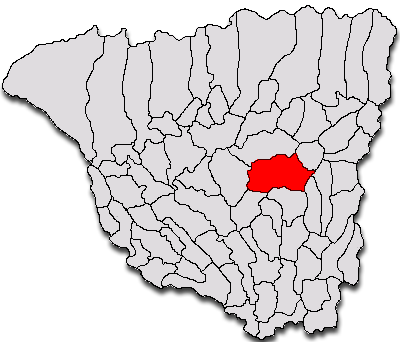
- Location in Gorj County

- Location in Romania
- Coordinates: 44°57′30″N 23°30′23″E
- Country: Romania
- County: Gorj

Government
  - Mayor (2024–2028): Dănuț Birău (PSD)
- Area: 137 km^{2} (53 sq mi)
- Elevation: 200 m (660 ft)
- Population (2021-12-01): 7,616
  - Density: 55.6/km^{2} (144/sq mi)
- Time zone: UTC+02:00 (EET)
  - Summer (DST): UTC+03:00 (EEST)
- Postal code: 215500
- Area code: +(40) 0253
- Vehicle reg.: GJ
- Website: www.primariacarbunesti.ro

Târgu Cărbunești is a town in Gorj County, Oltenia, Romania with a population of 7,616 as of 2021. It lies in the south-eastern part of the county and administers ten villages: Blahnița de Jos, Cărbunești-Sat, Cojani, Crețești, Curteana, Floreșteni, Măceșu, Pojogeni, Rogojeni, and Ștefănești.

Historical population
Year	Pop.	±%
1977	7,519	—
1992	9,281	+23.4%
2002	9,338	+0.6%
2011	7,897	−15.4%
2021	7,616	−3.6%
Source: Census data

== Natives ==
- Cristian Albeanu (born 1971), footballer
- Florin Cioabă, (1954–2013), Pentecostal minister and self-proclaimed King of the Gypsies
- Radu Pietreanu (born 1964), actor, scenarist, and singer
- Ion Sburlea (born 1971), footballer
- Lidia Șimon (born 1973), long-distance runner
