= ACS Viitorul Târgu Jiu =

Romanian football club

Viitorul Târgu Jiu
- Full name: Asociația Clubul Sportiv; Viitorul Pandurii Târgu Jiu
- Short name: Viitorul Pandurii
- Founded: 17 July 1998; 28 years ago as AS Șirineasa
- Dissolved: 15 October 2024; 23 months ago
- Ground: Stadionul Comunal / Constantina Diță-Tomescu
- Capacity: 1,000 / 12,518

Asociația Clubul Sportiv Viitorul Pandurii Târgu Jiu, commonly known as Viitorul Pandurii Târgu Jiu or Viitorul Târgu Jiu, was a Romanian football club from Târgu Jiu, Gorj County.

Established in 1998, the team was known as Șirineasa and ACS Energeticianul, before moving to Târgu Jiu in the summer of 2019 and renaming as Viitorul Pandurii Târgu Jiu. It was dissolved in October 2024.

== History ==
Viitorul Pandurii Târgu Jiu was founded in 1998 as AS Șirineasa and played for almost all its history at the county level, Liga IV and Liga V. At the end of the 2015–16 Liga IV season, the team was crowned the champion of Vâlcea County and went to the promotion play-off match where they defeated Dolj County champions, Tractorul Cetate, 5–4 on an aggregate and promoted to Liga III for the first time in the history of the club.

The first Liga III season was a very difficult one, with financial problems and the weak number of players leading the team to the relegation area until the winter break. In the winter transfer period, CS Șirineasa transferred an entire team from the newly disbanded CSM Râmnicu Vâlcea, but the team did not find its rhythm, finishing in 13th place and relegated to Liga IV after only one season.

In the summer of 2017, the club received an invitation from the Romanian Football Federation to continue in Liga III due to lack of teams. The club accepted and was later taken over by the businessman, Nicolae Sarcină. Originally from Gorj County, he was planning to move the team to Târgu Jiu, following to play on the newly built Tudor Vladimirescu Stadium, within this idea the club changed its name from a legal point of view to ACS Energeticianul, shortly before the start of the season, but too late for a change in the Romanian Football Federation records, playing practically in the 2017–18 season with two names CS Șirineasa and ACS Energeticianul, fact that attracted a lot of complaints from the other competitors in the championship. The completion of the stadium construction was delayed and Șirineasa was in the situation of not having where to play, so the team moved to Petroșani, hometown of the new club president, Alin Zgripcea, taking advantage of the disastrous situation of local club Jiul Petroșani and the football void in the city. Șirineasa started to play in black and white, Jiul colors, with the promise that at the end of the season the club will merge with Jiul Petroșani, taking its brand and record, the club basically being in the incredible situation of having three identities, two legally and a third one, from an ideological point of view. With important investments, former Romanian international Cristian Dulca as a coach and well-known players such as: Mihai Mincă, Daniel Lung, Florin Costea or Cătălin Țîră, the team dominated Seria IV of the Liga III and promoted with and advance of 9 points over CSMȘ Reșița, the main pursuer, promoting for the first time in its history in the Liga II.

At the end of the season, Petroșani Municipality refused to pass the Jiul Stadium into the property of Șirineasa and even asking for a rent to use the sports base. Dissatisfied with the fact that they are not helped by the municipality and complaining that in the summer of 2017, they renovated the sports base from their own sources (the stadium being in the dereliction for over 10 years), the club officials of Șirineasa decided to move the team from Petroșani to Târgu Jiu.

ACS Energeticianul 2018–19 crest

On 29 June 2018, it was announced officially that the club will be named ACS Energeticianul also in the Romanian Football Federation records starting with the 2018–19 season. After one week, the club officials met with representatives of the municipality of Petroșani finally reaching an agreement to use Jiul Stadium in 2018–19, the club canceling its move.

=== 2019–2024 ===
On 30 June 2019, Luceafărul Oradea withdrew from Liga II in favor of Energeticianul, which was saved from relegation, as it was the first team relegated at the end of the last season. Most important players and the entire technical staff was moved from Luceafărul to Energeticianul. It was also announced that the club was moved again, this time from Petroșani to Târgu Jiu and renamed as Viitorul Pandurii Târgu Jiu, also changing its colors from white and black to white and blue.

On 15 October 2024, after nine rounds of the 2024–25 season, the club was withdrawn from competition and dissolved after filing for bankruptcy.

== Grounds ==
=== Stadionul Municipal ===
From the summer until the early November 2019, Viitorul Pandurii Târgu Jiu played its home matches on Municipal Stadium in Drobeta-Turnu Severin, with a capacity of 20,054 seats. Municipal Stadium was used as temporary home ground, until Tudor Vladimirescu Stadium, in Târgu Jiu, was opened.

=== Stadionul Tudor Vladimirescu ===
Since 9 November 2019, Viitorul Pandurii Târgu Jiu played its home matches on Tudor Vladimirescu Stadium in Târgu Jiu, with a capacity of 12,518 seats. The arena was opened in November 2019 in order to replace the former stadium, and is also the home ground of Pandurii Târgu Jiu and FC U Craiova 1948.

== Honours ==
- Liga III
  - Winners (1): 2017–18
- Liga IV – Vâlcea County
  - Winners (1): 2015–16

== League history ==
Season	Tier	League	Pos.	Cupa României
2024–25	2	Liga II	22nd (R)	Third Round
2023–24	2	Liga II	16th	Third Round
2022–23	2	Liga II	12th	Fourth Round
2021–22	2	Liga II	13th	Fourth Round
2020–21	2	Liga II	8th	Semi-finals
2019–20	2	Liga II	10th	Third Round
2018–19	2	Liga II	16th	Round of 32
2017–18	3	Liga III (Seria IV)	1st (C, P)	Fourth Round
2016–17	3	Liga III (Seria III)	13th	County Phase
2015–16	4	Liga IV (VL)	1st (C, P)	County Phase
