= CS Pandurii Târgu Jiu =

Association football club in Târgu Jiu

Pandurii Târgu Jiu
- Full name: Clubul Sportiv Pandurii Lignitul Târgu Jiu
- Nicknames: Alb-albaștrii (The White and Blues); Minerii (The Miners); Gorjenii (The Gorj County People)
- Short name: Pandurii
- Founded: 1 February 1962; 64 years ago
- Dissolved: 20 October 2022; 4 years ago
- Ground: Tudor Vladimirescu
- Capacity: 12,518
- Website: www.panduriics.ro
Home colours	Away colours

Clubul Sportiv Pandurii Lignitul Târgu Jiu (Romanian pronunciation: [ˌklubul sporˈtiv panˈdurij liɡˈnitul ˌtɨrɡu ˈʒiw]), commonly known as Pandurii Târgu Jiu or simply Pandurii, was a Romanian football club based in Târgu Jiu, Gorj County, which last competed in the Liga IV.

Founded in 1962 following the merger of Flacăra-Unirea Târgu Jiu and CIL Târgu Jiu, the team's best performances were finishing as Liga I runners-up in the 2012–13 season and playing a League Cup final in 2015. Gorjenii qualified for the first time for a European competition in the 2013–14 campaign, when they reached the group stages of the UEFA Europa League.

The colours of Pandurii Târgu Jiu were white and blue, and they played their home games at the Tudor Vladimirescu Stadium, which has a seating capacity of 12,518.

== History ==
Chart of the yearly league positions of Pandurii Târgu Jiu in the Romanian football league system.

=== Founding and lower divisions (1962–2005) ===
Pandurii Târgu Jiu was founded in August 1962, after the merger of the two big rivals from the town, Flacăra-Unirea Târgu Jiu and CIL Târgu-Jiu. The club entered the fourth division of Romanian football, with a strong objective, to promote immediately in the third division. And the target was reached, Pandurii gaining the promotion to Divizia C in June 1963. Their first game in this division was played on 1 September 1963, against Siderurgistul Hunedoara. Pandurii won by a big margin, 6–0, goals scored by Chițu (12'), Nelu Băloi (35'), Melinte (53', 80') and Vasilescu (83', 85').

In the first years, Pandurii finished constantly in the first half of the standings, so the club decided to attack a promotion to Divizia B. In the 1976–77 season, with a young team and with Titus Ozon as coach, the dream came true. Pandurii dominated the competition, climbed from the first stages on top of the standings and won the promotion to the second division. But this level was a much bigger hat to wear for Pandurii, who relegated the next season back to Divizia C.

The following years, the team changed frequently the division, promoting to Divizia B and relegating after a few years. They played in Divizia B between 1979 and 1983 then between 1986 and 1991. After a decade in Divizia C, in 2000 the team promoted again in the second league, and in 2004 finished second, behind Sportul Studențesc.

=== Beginning years in the top league (2005–2011) ===
The performance from the last seasons was an incentive for the management who decided to push for the first presence of Pandurii in Divizia A. With Emil Săndoi as coach, and with a young group of players like Tiberiu Lung and Sorin Vintilescu but also with some experienced players like, Florin Popete, Robert Vancea and Romulus Buia, the team won the promotion.

It was difficult to maintain its position in Divizia A, and Pandurii finished their first season in the 15th place, right below the relegation line. But the Romanian Football Federation decided at the end of the season not to give Sportul Studențesc their licence for the following year, and kept instead the first team under the line, Pandurii. With the bullet dodged, the management decided to enforce the team, so the relegation shouldn't be a problem.

Alexandru Păcurar, Ciprian Vasilache and Liviu Mihai were brought, and the team finished 11th in the 2006–07 season. They kept their position at the middle of the table for the next seasons.

In 2010, they finished below the line but avoided the relegation after the withdrawal of Internațional Curtea de Argeș, team that ended tenth but the owner decided to disband the club. With a lot of players from Internațional Curtea de Argeș like Vlad Chiricheș, Mihai Pintilii, and Dan Nistor, Pandurii were 13th the following season.

=== Ascent and first European participation (2011–2013) ===
Period	Name
1963–1965	Pandurii Târgu Jiu
1965–1970	Victoria Târgu Jiu
1970–1973	Pandurii Târgu Jiu
1973–1975	Cimentul Târgu Jiu
1975–1976	Cimentul Victoria Târgu Jiu
1976–1985	Pandurii Târgu Jiu
1985–1988	Gloria Pandurii Târgu Jiu
1988–2022	Pandurii Târgu Jiu

In the 2011–12 season the team reached the highest place in history, finishing seventh. For a while, they were fifth and the fans hoped for Europa League.

The following season saw Pandurii finishing as Liga I runners-up for the first time ever, qualifying for the 2013–14 UEFA Europa League, the club's first ever European participation. After defeating Levadia Tallinn, Hapoel Tel Aviv and Braga, Pandurii entered the Group stage, being drawn into Group E with F.C. Paços de Ferreira, FC Dnipro and ACF Fiorentina.

=== Achieving performance (2013–2017) ===
On 10 March 2015, with Edward Iordănescu as coach Pandurii defeated FC Dinamo București in the semi-finals of the new established competition Cupa Ligii, to qualify for their first ever cup final. On their way to play the final they beat one of the Romanian giants FC Petrolul Ploiești at Ilie Oană Stadium. In the final FC Steaua București beat Pandurii at Arena Națională stadium but with a controversial penalty in the beginning of the match.

In the 2015–16, season of Liga I Pandurii had many achievements along the season with the same coach and players like UEFA Europa League winner Cristian Săpunaru, Dan Nistor, Ioan Hora and Mihai Răduț and Narcis Răducan as president. In April 2015 they became the first team to win a match in Liga I with the new play-off, play-out system. On 6 February 2016, they secured both a place in the competition play-offs and a place in a European competition next year with a victory with ASA 2013 Târgu Mureș. During this season they had the most matches without a defeat, about 10 games. At the end of the season, Pandurii finished on the podium as third-place qualifying for the second time in UEFA Europa League, but this time in the third qualifying round.

=== Back to the lower leagues (2017–2022) ===
Although the team had a fairly good start for the season 2016–17, with players like Lucian Sânmărtean or George Țucudean coming at the club, and playing in the summer against Maccabi Tel Aviv F.C. in Europa League, problems occurred in the second half of the season. The main sponsor started having problems and for this reason they did not fund the team anymore. Many players have left the team so the young players from the second team were brought to the first team along with other players from elsewhere. Unfortunately after 12 seasons in Liga 1 Pandurii relegated for the first time since the 2005 promotion but fought to avoid it until the last round.

For the 2017–18 Liga II, Pandurii has been prepared with some players promoted from the second team or from the youth teams and moved to Motru until the new stadium was completed in 2019.

In the wake of the 2020–21 Liga II season, Pandurii relegated in Liga III for the first time after 21 years.

== Ground ==
The club play its matches at the new Tudor Vladimirescu Stadium, opened in 2019.

== Honours ==
=== Domestic ===
Honour		Season(s)
Liga I	Runners-up	2012–13
Liga I	Third place	2015–16
Liga II	Winners	2004–05
Liga II	Runners-up	2003–04
Liga III	Winners	1976–77, 1978–79, 1985–86, 1999–2000
Liga III	Runners-up	1975–76, 1983–84
Liga IV – Gorj County	Winners	1962–63
Cupa Ligii	Runners-up	2014–15

=== Youth ===
Honour		Season(s)
Cupa României U17	Winners	2015–16
Supercupa României U17	Runners-up	2016

== Rankings ==
This is the UEFA club's coefficient as of 1 November 2018:

Pos.	Team	Points
304	(Romania) Universitatea Craiova	3.190
305	(Romania) Dinamo București	3.190
306	(Romania) Pandurii Târgu Jiu	3.190
307	(Romania) Politehnica Iași	3.190
308	(Romania) Târgu Mureș	3.190

== Records and statistics ==
=== Domestic ===
- Liga I seasons: 12
- Liga I play-offs seasons: 1
- Liga I longest unbeaten run: 10 (2015–16)
- Place 30 out of 98 teams in Liga I all-time table
- Cupa României best result: Semi-finals (2006–07)
- Cupa Ligii seasons: 3
- The most successful team from Gorj County

=== League history ===
Season	Tier	Division	Place	Cupa României
2021–22	3	Liga III (Seria VII)	4th	Third Round
2020–21	2	Liga II	19th (R)	Third Round
2019–20	2	Liga II	19th	Third Round
2018–19	2	Liga II	15th	Fourth Round
2017–18	2	Liga II	14th	Fourth Round
2016–17	1	Liga I	13th (R)	Round of 16
2015–16	1	Liga I	3rd	Round of 16
2014–15	1	Liga I	9th	Quarter-finals
2013–14	1	Liga I	7th	Quarter-finals
2012–13	1	Liga I	2nd	Round of 16
2011–12	1	Liga I	7th	Quarter-finals
2010–11	1	Liga I	13th	Round of 16
2009–10	1	Liga I	15th	Round of 32
2008–09	1	Liga I	11th	Quarter-finals
2007–08	1	Liga I	12th	Quarter-finals
2006–07	1	Liga I	11th	Semi-finals
2005–06	1	Divizia A	15th	Round of 16
2004–05	2	Divizia B (Seria II)	1st (C, P)	Round of 32
2003–04	2	Divizia B (Seria II)	2nd	Round of 32
2002–03	2	Divizia B (Seria II)	12th	Preliminary round
2001–02	2	Divizia B (Seria II)	9th	Preliminary round
2000–01	2	Divizia B (Seria II)	6th	Round of 32
1999–00	3	Divizia C (Seria V)	1st (C, P)	Round of 32
1998–99	3	Divizia C (Seria III)	5th	
1997–98	3	Divizia C (Seria III)	7th	
1996–97	4	Divizia D (Gorj County)	—	
1995–96	4	Divizia D (Gorj County)	—	
1994–95	4	Divizia D (Gorj County)	—	
1993–94	4	Divizia D (Gorj County)	—	
1992–93	4	Divizia D (Gorj County)	—	
1991–92	3	Divizia C (Seria IX)	11th (R)	
1990–91	2	Divizia B (Seria II)	16th (R)	
1989–90	2	Divizia B (Seria II)	14th	
1988–89	2	Divizia B (Seria II)	5th	Round of 32
1987–88	2	Divizia B (Seria II)	3rd	Round of 32
1986–87	2	Divizia B (Seria II)	13th	
1985–86	3	Divizia C (Seria VII)	1st (C, P)	
1984–85	3	Divizia C (Seria VII)	3rd	
1983–84	3	Divizia C (Seria VII)	2nd	
1982–83	2	Divizia B (Seria II)	15th (R)	
1981–82	2	Divizia B (Seria II)	13th	
1980–81	2	Divizia B (Seria II)	8th	
1979–80	2	Divizia B (Seria II)	13th	
1978–79	3	Divizia C (Seria VII)	1st (C, P)	
1977–78	2	Divizia B (Seria II)	17th (R)	
1976–77	3	Divizia C (Seria VII)	1st (C, P)	
1975–76	3	Divizia C (Seria VII)	2nd	
1974–75	3	Divizia C (Seria VII)	5th	
1973–74	3	Divizia C (Seria VII)	8th	
1972–73	3	Divizia C (Seria VII)	7th	
1971–72	3	Divizia C (Seria VII)	6th	
1970–71	3	Divizia C (Seria V)	9th	
1969–70	3	Divizia C (Seria V)	8th	
1968–69	3	Divizia C (Seria V)	11th	
1967–68	3	Divizia C (West Series)	11th	Round of 32
1966–67	3	Divizia C (West Series)	7th	
1965–66	3	Divizia C (West Series)	3rd	
1964–65	3	Divizia C (West Series)	10th	
1963–64	3	Divizia C (West Series)	3rd	
1962–63	4	Regional Championship (Oltenia Region)	1st (C, P)	

== European record ==
- UEFA Europa League seasons: 2
- UEFA Europa League best result: Group Stages (2013–14)
- UEFA Europa League biggest win: 4–0 vs. Levadia Tallinn (2013–14)

=== European Cups history ===
Notes

- 1Q: First qualifying round
- 2Q: Second qualifying round
- 3Q: Third qualifying round
- PO: Play-off round

Season	Competition	Round	Opponent	Home	Away	Aggregate
2013–14	UEFA Europa League	2Q	(Estonia) Levadia Tallinn	4–0	0–0	4–0
2013–14	UEFA Europa League	3Q	(Israel) Hapoel Tel Aviv	1–1	2–1	3–2
2013–14	UEFA Europa League	PO	(Portugal) Braga	0–1	2–0 (aet)	2–1
2013–14	UEFA Europa League	Group E	(Italy) Fiorentina	1–2	0–3	4th
2013–14	UEFA Europa League	Group E	(Ukraine) Dnipro Dnipropetrovsk	0–1	1–4	4th
2013–14	UEFA Europa League	Group E	(Portugal) Paços de Ferreira	0–0	1–1	4th
2016–17	UEFA Europa League	3Q	(Israel) Maccabi Tel Aviv	1–3	1–2	2–5

=== European cups all-time statistics ===
As of August 2016.

Competition	S	P	W	D	L	GF	GA	GD
UEFA Europa League	2	14	3	4	7	14	19	−5
Total	2	14	3	3	8	14	19	−5

== Notable former players ==
The footballers enlisted below have had international cap(s) for their respective countries at junior and/or senior level and/or more than 100 caps for CS Pandurii Târgu Jiu.

Romania

- (Romania) Paul Anton
- (Romania) Alin Chibulcutean
- (Romania) Vlad Chiricheș
- (Romania) Liviu Ciobotariu
- (Romania) Constantin Grecu
- (Romania) Ovidiu Herea
- (Romania) Ioan Hora
- (Romania) Alexandru Maxim
- (Romania) Dan Nistor
- (Romania) Daniel Orac
- (Romania) Mihai Pintilii
- (Romania) Victor Pițurcă
- (Romania) Marian Pleașcă

Romania

- (Romania) Florin Popete
- (Romania) Mihai Răduț
- (Romania) Adrian Ropotan
- (Romania) Adrian Rusu
- (Romania) Lucian Sânmărtean
- (Romania) Cristian Săpunaru
- (Romania) Răzvan Stanca
- (Romania) Iulian Ștefan
- (Romania) George Țucudean
- (Romania) Bogdan Ungurușan
- (Romania) Robert Vancea
- (Romania) Claudiu Voiculeț

Andorra

- (Andorra) Eric de las Heras

Bosnia and Herzegovina

- (Bosnia and Herzegovina) Adnan Gušo
- (Bosnia and Herzegovina) Stojan Vranješ

Brazil

- (Brazil) Cardoso

Congo

- (Republic of the Congo) Armel Disney

Cyprus

- (Cyprus) Paraskevas Christou

Czech Republic

- (Czech Republic) Lukáš Droppa

Ivory Coast

- (Ivory Coast) Constant Djakpa
- (Ivory Coast) Ousmane Viera

Lithuania

- (Lithuania) Deivydas Matulevičius

Nigeria

- (Nigeria) Christian Obodo

Portugal

- (Portugal) Pedro Mingote
- (Portugal) Vasco Fernandes

Slovenia

- (Slovenia) Jaka Štromajer

== Notable former managers ==
- (Romania) Ilie Balaci
- (Romania) Sorin Cârțu
- (Romania) Petre Grigoraș
- (Romania) Marin Ion
- (Romania) Edward Iordănescu
- (Romania) Eugen Neagoe
- (Romania) Titus Ozon
- (Romania) Emil Săndoi
