= 2016–17 Liga II =

Liga II
- Season: 2016–17
- Country: Romania
- Teams: 20
- Champions: Juventus București
- Promoted: Juventus București; Sepsi OSK
- Relegated: Metalul Reșița; Râmnicu Vâlcea; Unirea Tărlungeni; Berceni; Șoimii Pâncota
- Matches: 306
- Goals: 860 (2.81 per match)
- Top goalscorer: Bogdan Chipirliu (30) (Juventus București)
- Biggest home win: Olimpia 7-0 Brăila
- Biggest away win: Clinceni 0-7 Juventus
- Highest scoring: ASU Poli 3-4 Chindia; Rm. Vâlcea 5-2 Metalul; Sepsi 6-1 Foresta; Clinceni 0-7 Juventus; Afumați 5-2 Metalul; Olimpia 7-0 Brăila
- Longest winning run: 8 matches: Juventus București
- Longest unbeaten run: 9 matches: Brașov
- Longest winless run: 32 matches: Unirea Tărlungeni
- Longest losing run: 18 matches: Unirea Tărlungeni
- Highest attendance: 10,000; ASU Poli 0–3 UTA (21 May 2017)
- Lowest attendance: 40; Clinceni 1–4 Mioveni (29 October 2016)
- All statistics correct as of 3 June 2017.

The 2016–17 Liga II was the 77th season of the Liga II, the second tier of the Romanian football league system. The season began on 6 August 2016.

A total of 20 teams contested the league. It was the first Liga II season with a single series. The season was played in a round-robin tournament. The first two teams promoted to Liga I at the end of the season and the third-placed team played a play-off match against the 12th-placed team from Liga I. The last five teams relegated to Liga III.

== Team changes ==
=== To Liga II ===
Promoted from Liga III

- Sepsi OSK
- Juventus București
- Afumați
- ASU Politehnica Timișoara
- Luceafărul Oradea

Relegated from Liga I

- —

=== From Liga II ===
Relegated to Liga III

- Gloria Buzău
- Universitatea Cluj
- Bucovina Pojorâta
- Ceahlăul Piatra Neamț
- Oțelul Galați
- Bihor Oradea
- Dorohoi
- Caransebeș

Promoted to Liga I

- Gaz Metan Mediaș

=== Excluded teams ===
After the end of the last season, Petrolul Ploiești was dissolved.

On 21 July 2016 Rapid București was excluded from Liga I after the club went into dissolution. Their place was taken by Poli Timișoara.

Farul Constanța withdrew from Liga II due to financial difficulties and enrolled in Liga III.

SC Bacău withdrew from Liga II due to financial difficulties and enrolled in Liga III.

Baia Mare withdrew from the championship due to financial difficulties.

=== Teams spared from relegation ===
Foresta Suceava, Unirea Tărlungeni and Metalul Reșița were spared from relegation due to lack of teams.

=== Renamed teams ===
Rapid CFR Suceava was renamed as Foresta Suceava.

=== Moved teams ===
ACS Berceni moved from Berceni to Buftea.

Unirea Tărlungeni was moved from Tărlungeni to Ștefăneștii de Jos and took all the players and the staff of CS Ștefănești which was dissolved.

Metalul Reșița was moved from Reșița to Snagov and took all the players and the staff of Voința Snagov which was dissolved.

Șoimii Pâncota was moved from Pâncota to Șiria.

== Stadiums by capacity ==
Club	City	Stadium	Capacity
Academica	Clinceni	Clinceni	2,800
Afumați	Afumați	Comunal	3,000
ASU Politehnica	Timișoara	Știința / Dan Păltinișanu	1,000 / 32,972
Balotești	Balotești	Central	3,780
Berceni	Berceni	CNAF / Orășenesc	1,600 / 1,500
Brașov	Brașov	Silviu Ploeșteanu	8,800
Chindia	Târgoviște	Eugen Popescu	6,500
Dacia Unirea	Brăila	Municipal	20,154
Dunărea	Călărași	Ion Comșa	10,400
Foresta	Suceava	Areni	7,000
Juventus	Bucharest	Juventus	6,000
Luceafărul	Oradea	Luceafărul / Iuliu Bodola	2,200 / 11,155
Metalul	Snagov	Voința	2,000
Mioveni	Mioveni	Orășenesc	7,000
Olimpia	Satu Mare	Olimpia	18,000
Râmnicu Vâlcea	Râmnicu Vâlcea	Municipal	12,000
Sepsi	Sfântu Gheorghe	Municipal	5,000
Șoimii	Șiria	Otto Greffner	1,100
Unirea	Ștefănești	Dumitru Mătărău	1,200
UTA	Arad	Motorul / Otto Greffner	2,000 / 1,380

== Stadiums by locations ==
Location of teams in 2016–17 Liga II

== Personnel and kits ==
Note: Flags indicate national team as has been defined under FIFA eligibility rules. Players and Managers may hold more than one non-FIFA nationality.

Team	Manager	Captain	Kit manufacturer	Shirt sponsor
Academica Clinceni	(Romania) Erik Lincar	(Romania) Florin Matache	Joma	Salerm Cosmetics
Afumați	(Romania) Vasile Neagu	(Romania) Răzvan Patriche	Nike	—
ASU Politehnica	(Romania) Sorin Brîndescu	(Romania) Cristian Gălan	Westiment	Alexandrion
Balotești	(Romania) Augustin Călin	(Romania) Ionuț Sandu	Joma	—
Berceni	—	—	—	—
Brașov	(Romania) Cornel Țălnar	(Romania) Florin Iacob	Acerbis	Maurer Imobiliare
Chindia Târgoviște	(Romania) Nicolae Croitoru	(Romania) Dragoș Pătru	Joma	Regata
Dacia Unirea Brăila	(Romania) Alin Pânzaru	(Romania) Laurențiu Ivan	Joma	Comision Trade
Dunărea Călărași	(Romania) Adrian Mihalcea	(Romania) Cezar Lungu	Jako	Condorul, Prosol
Foresta Suceava	(Romania) Marius Lup	(Romania) Daniel Lung	Givova	Primăria Suceava
Juventus București	(Romania) Daniel Oprița	(Romania) Valentin Bărbulescu	Joma	—
Luceafărul Oradea	(Romania) Alexandru Kiss	(Romania) Constantin Roșu	Adidas	—
Metalul Reșița	(Romania) Mihai Stoica	(Romania) Cristian Munteanu	Nike	—
Mioveni	(Romania) Iordan Eftimie	(Brazil) Roberto Ayza	Legea	Primăria Mioveni
Olimpia Satu Mare	(Romania) Bogdan Andone	(Romania) Cosmin Iuhas	Joma	Consiliul Judeţean Satu Mare
Râmnicu Vâlcea	—	—	—	—
Sepsi OSK	(Romania) Valentin Suciu	(Romania) Attila Hadnagy	Adidas	Gyermelyi
Șoimii Pâncota	—	—	—	—
Unirea Tărlungeni	—	—	—	—
UTA Arad	(Romania) Laurențiu Roșu	(Romania) Alin Gligor	Saller	Pletl

== Managerial changes ==
Team	Outgoing manager	Manner of departure	Date of vacancy	Position in table	Incoming manager	Date of appointment
Luceafărul	(Romania) Marius Popa (caretaker)	End of tenure as a caretaker	31 May 2016	Pre-season	(Romania) Florin Farcaș	9 June 2016
Unirea Tărlungeni	(Romania) Daniel Bona	Mutual agreement	17 June 2016	Pre-season	(Romania) Laurențiu Tudor	2 August 2016
Râmnicu Vâlcea	(Romania) Adrian Dulcea	Mutual agreement	26 June 2016	Pre-season	(Romania) Ionel Gane	27 June 2016
Mioveni	(Romania) Iordan Eftimie	Mutual agreement	26 June 2016	Pre-season	(Romania) Alexandru Pelici	27 June 2016
Foresta Suceava	(Romania) Daniel Bălan	End of contract	2 July 2016	Pre-season	(Romania) Adrian Iencsi	2 July 2016
Brașov	(Romania) Adrian Szabo	End of contract	3 July 2016	Pre-season	(Romania) Cornel Țălnar	25 July 2016
Olimpia Satu Mare	(Romania) Mircea Bolba	Resigned	25 July 2016	Pre-season	(Romania) Bogdan Andone	28 July 2016
Metalul Reșița	(Romania) Carol Gurgu	Mutual agreement	5 August 2016	Pre-season	(Romania) George Dumitru	5 August 2016
Șoimii Pâncota	(Romania) Zsolt Muzsnay	End of contract	5 August 2016	Pre-season	(Romania) Călin Petrică (caretaker)	5 August 2016
Berceni	(Romania) Răzvan Rotaru	Mutual agreement	5 August 2016	Pre-season	(Romania) Marcel Abăluță	5 August 2016
Foresta Suceava	(Romania) Adrian Iencsi	Mutual agreement	16 August 2016	17	(Romania) Cristian Popovici	17 August 2016
Luceafărul	(Romania) Florin Farcaș	Resigned	27 August 2016	16	(Romania) Erik Lincar	29 August 2016
Metalul Reșița	(Romania) George Dumitru	Mutual agreement	8 September 2016	18	(Romania) Mihai Stoica	9 September 2016
Academica	(Romania) Mugur Bolohan	Resigned	27 September 2016	15	(Romania) Adrian Ene (caretaker)	28 September 2016
Șoimii Pâncota	(Romania) Călin Petrică (caretaker)	End of tenure as a caretaker	28 September 2016	20	(Serbia) Nikola Jovanić	29 September 2016
UTA Arad	(Romania) Roland Nagy	Sacked	9 October 2016	8	(Romania) Laurențiu Roșu	10 October 2016
Șoimii Pâncota	(Serbia) Nikola Jovanić	Resigned	11 October 2016	20	(Romania) Călin Petrică (caretaker)	11 October 2016
Berceni	(Romania) Marcel Abăluță	Mutual agreement	13 October 2016	19	(Romania) Mugur Bolohan	14 October 2016
Șoimii Pâncota	(Romania) Călin Petrică (caretaker)	The team was dissolved.	28 October 2016	20	—	—
Unirea Tărlungeni	(Romania) Laurențiu Tudor	Mutual agreement	31 October 2016	16	(Romania) Adrian Matei	1 November 2016
Luceafărul	(Romania) Erik Lincar	Resigned	8 November 2016	11	(Romania) Cristian Lupuț (caretaker)	9 November 2016
Berceni	(Romania) Mugur Bolohan	The team was dissolved.	13 November 2016	19	—	—
Râmnicu Vâlcea	(Romania) Ionel Gane	Mutual agreement	8 December 2016	14	(Romania) Adrian Dulcea (caretaker)	9 December 2016
Balotești	(Romania) Cornel Nica	Mutual agreement	22 December 2016	16	(Romania) Augustin Călin	27 February 2017
Unirea Tărlungeni	(Romania) Adrian Matei	Mutual agreement	28 December 2016	17	—	—
Luceafărul	(Romania) Cristian Lupuț (caretaker)	End of tenure as a caretaker	31 December 2016	8	(Romania) Cristian Lupuț	9 January 2017
Academica	(Romania) Adrian Ene (caretaker)	End of tenure as a caretaker	31 December 2016	13	(Romania) Adrian Ene	20 January 2017
Râmnicu Vâlcea	(Romania) Adrian Dulcea (caretaker)	Signed by Atletic Bradu	13 January 2017	14	—	—
Luceafărul	(Romania) Cristian Lupuț	Mutual agreement	14 March 2017	9	(Romania) Alexandru Kiss	14 March 2017
Foresta Suceava	(Romania) Cristian Popovici	Mutual agreement	29 March 2017	11	(Romania) Marius Lup (caretaker)	30 March 2017
Mioveni	(Romania) Alexandru Pelici	Sacked	28 April 2017	5	(Romania) Iordan Eftimie	28 April 2017
Academica	(Romania) Adrian Ene	Mutual agreement	11 May 2017	14	(Romania) Erik Lincar	11 May 2017

== League table ==
Pos	Team	Pld	W	D	L	GF	GA	GD	Pts	Promotion or relegation
1	Juventus București (C, P)	34	27	3	4	77	18	+59	84	Promotion to Liga I
2	Sepsi OSK (P)	34	21	8	5	62	29	+33	71	Promotion to Liga I
3	UTA Arad	34	20	6	8	64	32	+32	66	Qualification to promotion play-off
4	Mioveni	34	17	8	9	51	30	+21	59	
5	Chindia Târgoviște	34	18	4	12	57	37	+20	58	
6	Brașov (D, R)	34	15	11	8	49	35	+14	56 (Note: 1. BRA 7P.; 2. DUN 7P.; 3. AFU 3P.)	Relegation to Liga III
7	Dunărea Călărași	34	16	8	10	52	40	+12	56	
8	Afumați	34	17	5	12	56	36	+20	56	
9	Olimpia Satu Mare	34	16	6	12	53	34	+19	54	
10	Luceafărul Oradea	34	14	5	15	48	38	+10	47	
11	Dacia Unirea Brăila	34	14	4	16	37	56	−19	46	
12	Foresta Suceava	34	12	5	17	49	69	−20	41	
13	Balotești	34	11	7	16	44	56	−12	40	
14	Academica Clinceni	34	11	6	17	47	69	−22	39	
15	ASU Politehnica Timișoara	34	10	8	16	48	59	−11	38	
16	Metalul Reșița	34	6	3	25	35	77	−42	21	
17	Râmnicu Vâlcea (Note: CSM Râmnicu Vâlcea withdrew from the championship during the winter break and lost all matches from the second part of the championship by forfeit.) (D, R)	33	4	6	23	16	67	−51	18	Disqualified
18	Unirea Tărlungeni (Note: Unirea Tărlungeni were deducted 10 points and withdrew from the championship during the winter break and lost all matches from the second part of the championship by forfeit.) (D, R)	33	2	5	26	15	78	−63	1	Disqualified
19	Berceni (Note: ACS Berceni withdrew from the championship in the first part of the season and all their results were canceled.) (D, R)	0	0	0	0	0	0	0	0	Disqualified
20	Șoimii Pâncota (Note: Șoimii Pâncota was excluded from the championship for unpaid debts and all their results were canceled.) (D, R)	0	0	0	0	0	0	0	0	Disqualified

Source: FRF (in Romanian)
Rules for classification: 1st points; 2nd head-to-head points; 3rd head-to-head goal difference; 4th head-to-head goals scored; 5th head-to-head away goals scored; 6th goal difference; 7th number of goals scored.
(C) Champions; (D) Disqualified; (P) Promoted; (R) Relegated

== Season results ==
Home \ Away	ACA	AFU	ASU	BAL	BRA	CHI	DUB	DUN	FOR	JUV	LUC	SNA	MIO	OLI	RMV	SPS	UNI	UTA
Academica Clinceni		1–0	2–2	1–1	2–1	0–2	3–1	1–4	3–3	0–7	1–3	2–3	1–4	1–0	2–1	1–2	3–0	0–6
Afumați	3–2		2–0	1–0	2–1	2–1	1–1	1–2	6–0	1–3	0–0	5–2	1–2	3–0	3–1	1–1	2–2	0–0
ASU Politehnica Timișoara	0–1	2–1		4–1	1–1	3–4	1–1	4–1	2–3	2–1	1–3	2–0	1–2	1–1	3–0	0–1	2–0	0–3
Balotești	1–3	0–1	3–2		2–2	3–2	1–1	0–3	2–0	0–2	2–1	3–1	1–1	1–0	1–1	0–2	3–0	2–4
Brașov	0–2	2–0	2–0	4–2		2–0	1–2	3–0	2–1	1–0	1–1	2–0	0–0	1–2	3–0	1–1	3–0	3–2
Chindia Târgoviște	3–1	1–0	2–0	1–0	4–0		2–0	5–0	2–1	0–0	2–1	4–0	0–2	1–0	3–0	1–1	3–0	0–3
Dacia Unirea Brăila	1–0	1–5	4–1	1–1	1–0	0–2		2–1	4–1	0–3	1–0	2–1	1–0	0–1	0–1	0–1	2–0	2–1
Dunărea Călărași	0–0	1–0	2–3	2–1	1–1	3–1	1–2		3–0	1–2	3–2	3–0	0–0	2–0	1–0	0–0	1–0	1–0
Foresta Suceava	2–0	0–2	2–2	4–1	0–0	3–1	4–0	1–1		1–2	2–0	2–1	2–1	0–4	3–0	2–4	3–0	0–2
Juventus București	3–0	2–0	5–0	3–1	2–1	2–1	1–0	1–0	5–1		2–1	3–0	4–1	1–0	0–0	3–1	6–0	1–2
Luceafărul Oradea	1–2	1–0	4–1	0–1	1–2	2–0	4–1	1–1	2–0	0–1		3–1	2–1	2–2	3–0	1–2	3–0	0–1
Sportul Snagov	1–1	1–2	0–2	2–1	1–1	0–2	3–0	0–4	1–2	1–2	1–3		0–0	4–0	3–0	0–1	3–0	0–1
Mioveni	3–2	1–3	3–0	3–0	0–1	2–0	2–0	2–2	2–2	1–0	1–2	5–1		1–0	1–0	2–0	1–0	0–2
Olimpia Satu Mare	3–2	0–1	1–1	2–1	1–1	1–0	7–0	2–2	3–0	1–3	1–0	5–0	1–0		3–0	3–0	3–0	3–0
Râmnicu Vâlcea	0–3	0–3	0–0	0–3	1–1	0–3	0–3	0–3	0–2	0–3	3–0	5–2	0–3	0–0		0–1	1–0	0–3
Sepsi OSK	3–0	3–0	2–1	0–0	2–3	2–1	3–0	3–0	6–1	0–0	1–0	3–2	1–1	3–1	3–0		3–0	4–1
Unirea Tărlungeni	2–2	0–3	0–3	1–3	0–0	1–1	0–3	0–3	4–1	0–3	0–1	2–0	0–3	0–2		1–1		2–4
UTA Arad	3–2	2–1	1–1	1–2	1–2	2–2	3–0	2–0	1–0	0–1	0–0	4–0	0–0	2–0	2–2	2–1	3–0	

Source: Liga 2
Legend: Blue = home team win; Yellow = draw; Red = away team win.

== Liga I play-off ==
The 12th-placed team of the Liga I faced the 3rd-placed team of the Liga II.

Team 1	Agg.	Team 2	1st leg	2nd leg
ACS Poli Timișoara	5–2	UTA Arad	2–1	3–1

12 June 2017	ACS Poli Timișoara	2–1	UTA Arad	Timișoara
20:30	Pedro Henrique 22'; Cânu 25'		Strătilă 52'	Stadium: Dan Păltinișanu; Attendance: 12,000; Referee: George Găman (Craiova)

15 June 2017	UTA Arad	1–3	ACS Poli Timișoara	Șiria
17:30	Curtuiuș 5'		Bărbuț 17'; Drăghici 21'; Pedro Henrique 88'	Stadium: Otto Greffner; Attendance: 4,000; Referee: Radu Petrescu (Bucharest)

Notes:

- ACS Poli Timișoara qualified for 2017–18 Liga I and UTA Arad qualified for 2017–18 Liga II.

== Season statistics ==
=== Top scorers ===
Updated to matches played on 3 June 2017.

Rank	Player	Club	Goals
1	(Romania) Bogdan Chipirliu	Juventus București	30
2	(Romania) Attila Hadnagy	Sepsi OSK	28
2	(Romania) Adrian Petre	UTA Arad	28
4	(Romania) Cristian Cherchez	Chindia Târgoviște	19
4	(Romania) Marian Vlada	Afumați	19
6	(Romania) Marius Matei	Foresta Suceava (9) / Luceafărul Oradea (9)	18
7	(Romania) Claudiu Herea	Balotești	17
8	(Romania) Ștefan Blănaru	ASU Politehnica Timișoara	16

=== Clean sheets ===
Updated to matches played on 3 June 2017.

Rank	Player	Club	Clean sheets^{*}
1	(Romania) Bogdan Miron	UTA Arad	16
2	(Romania) Relu Stoian	Juventus București	15
3	(Romania) Roland Niczuly	Sepsi OSK	13
4	(Romania) Teodor Meilă	Chindia Târgoviște	12
5	(Romania) Iulian Anca-Trip	Olimpia Satu Mare	11
5	(Romania) Flavius Croitoru	Mioveni	11

^{*}Only goalkeepers who played all 90 minutes of a match are taken into consideration.

== Attendances ==
Pos	Team	Total	High	Low	Average	Change
1	Chindia Târgoviște	34,050	4,000	250	2,003	n/a
2	Sepsi OSK	27,700	4,000	700	1,847	n/a
3	Foresta Suceava	27,250	4,100	300	1,603	n/a
4	ASU Politehnica Timișoara	26,050	11,800	400	1,532	n/a
5	Brașov	13,800	2,900	300	920	n/a
6	UTA Arad	13,900	1,900	300	818	n/a^{1}
7	Râmnicu Vâlcea	6,450	1,200	150	645	n/a
8	Mioveni	11,600	2,000	200	644	n/a
9	Olimpia Satu Mare	8,400	1,200	150	560	n/a
10	Juventus București	10,500	1,500	150	553	n/a
11	Luceafărul Oradea	6,900	800	200	460	n/a
12	Dunărea Călărași	6,780	1,000	120	399	n/a
13	Dacia Unirea Brăila	6,370	1,200	70	354	n/a
14	Balotești	4,630	700	100	257	n/a^{3}
15	Afumați	4,310	750	50	227	n/a
16	Metalul Reșița	2,610	600	50	174	n/a^{2}
17	Academica Clinceni	2,160	400	40	127	n/a
18	Șoimii Pâncota	590	400	40	118	n/a^{2}
19	Unirea Tărlungeni	1,080	150	50	108	n/a^{2}
20	Berceni	750	180	50	107	n/a^{2}
	League total	215,880	11,800	40	673	n/a

Updated to games played on 3 June 2017
Source: League matches: Liga II 2016/2017
Notes:
1: UTA Arad played all matches out of its stadium, which is under construction.
2: Berceni, Metalul Reșița, Șoimii Pâncota and Unirea Tărlungeni were moved from their settlements and played all matches out of their stadiums.
