= 2017–18 Liga II =

Liga II
- Season: 2017–18
- Country: Romania
- Teams: 20
- Promoted: Dunărea Călărași; Hermannstadt
- Relegated: Afumați; Știința Miroslava; Foresta Suceava; Târgu Mureș; Olimpia Satu Mare
- Matches: 379
- Goals: 1,095 (2.89 per match)
- Top goalscorer: Vlad Rusu (26) (Luceafărul Oradea)
- Biggest home win: Ripensia 16-0 Foresta
- Biggest away win: Foresta 0-11 Snagov
- Highest scoring: Ripensia 16-0 Foresta
- Longest winning run: 13 matches: Dunărea Călărași
- Longest unbeaten run: 34 matches: Hermannstadt
- Longest winless run: 21 matches: Olimpia Satu Mare
- Longest losing run: 21 matches: Olimpia Satu Mare
- Highest attendance: 8,000; ASU Poli 2–1 UTA (15 October 2017)
- Lowest attendance: 20; Clinceni 2–1 Brăila (7 October 2017)
- All statistics correct as of 2 June 2018.

The 2017–18 Liga II (also known as 2017–18 Liga II Casa Pariurilor) was the 78th season of the Liga II, the second tier of the Romanian football league system. The season began on 5 August 2017 and ended on 2 June 2018.

A total of 20 teams contested the league. It was the second Liga II season with a single series. The season was played in a round-robin tournament. The first two teams promoted to Liga I at the end of the season and the third-placed team played a play-off match against the 12th-placed team from Liga I. The last five teams relegated to Liga III.

== Team changes ==
=== To Liga II ===
Promoted from Liga III

- Știința Miroslava
  (debut)
- Metaloglobus București
  (debut)
- SCM Pitești
  (after 4 years of absence)
- Ripensia Timișoara
  (after 70 years of absence)
- Hermannstadt
  (debut)

Relegated from Liga I

- Pandurii Târgu Jiu
  (ended 12-year stay in the top flight)
- Târgu Mureș
  (ended 4-year stay in the top flight)

=== From Liga II ===
Relegated to Liga III

- Râmnicu Vâlcea
  (ended 12-year stay)
- Unirea Tărlungeni
  (ended 4-year stay)
- Berceni
  (ended 4-year stay)
- Șoimii Pâncota
  (ended 3-year stay)

Promoted to Liga I

- Juventus București
  (ended 1-year stay)
- Sepsi Sfântu Gheorghe
  (ended 1-year stay)

=== Excluded teams ===
After the end of last season, Brașov was dissolved.

=== Teams spared from relegation ===
Metalul Reșița was spared from relegation due to withdrawal of Brașov.

=== Renamed teams ===
SCM Pitești bought FC Argeș brand and was renamed as Argeș Pitești.

Metalul Reșița was renamed as Sportul Snagov at one year after its movement to Snagov.

== Stadiums by capacity ==
Club	City	Stadium	Capacity
Academica	Clinceni	Clinceni	2,800
Afumați	Afumați	Comunal	3,000
Argeș	Pitești	Nicolae Dobrin	15,000
ASU Politehnica	Timișoara	Știința / Dan Păltinișanu	1,000 / 32,972
Balotești	Balotești	Central	3,780
Chindia	Târgoviște	Eugen Popescu	6,500
Dacia Unirea	Brăila	Municipal	20,154
Dunărea	Călărași	Ion Comșa	10,400
Foresta	Suceava	Areni	7,000
Hermannstadt	Sibiu	Municipal	14,200
Luceafărul	Oradea	Luceafărul / Iuliu Bodola	2,200 / 11,155
Metaloglobus	București	Metaloglobus	1,000
Mioveni	Mioveni	Orășenesc	7,000
Olimpia	Satu Mare	Daniel Prodan	18,000
Pandurii	Târgu Jiu	Minerul	5,000
Ripensia	Timișoara	Ciarda Roșie	1,000
Sportul	Snagov	Voinţa / Dumitru Mătărău	2,000 / 1,200
Știința	Miroslava	Comunal / Emil Alexandrescu	1,000 / 11,390
Târgu Mureș	Târgu Mureș	Trans-Sil	8,200
UTA	Arad	Otto Greffner	2,000

== Stadiums by locations ==
Location of teams in 2017–18 Liga II

== Personnel and kits ==
Note: Flags indicate national team as has been defined under FIFA eligibility rules. Players and Managers may hold more than one non-FIFA nationality.

Team	Manager	Captain	Kit manufacturer	Shirt sponsor
Academica Clinceni	(Romania) Ilie Poenaru	(Romania) Costin Gheorghe	Joma	—
Afumați	(Romania) Vasile Neagu	(Romania) Răzvan Patriche	Nike	—
Argeș Pitești	(Romania) Emil Săndoi	(Romania) Raul Costin	Macron	Primăria Pitești
ASU Politehnica Timișoara	(Romania) Antonio Foale	(Romania) Ioan Mera	Westiment	De Construct Ind
Balotești	(Romania) Emil Stanca	(Romania) Lucian Ion	Jako	—
Chindia Târgoviște	(Romania) Nicolae Croitoru	(Romania) Cristian Cherchez	Joma	Regata
Dacia Unirea Brăila	(Romania) Alin Pânzaru	(Romania) Sorin Frunză	Joma	Comision Trade
Dunărea Călărași	(Romania) Dan Alexa	(Romania) Cezar Lungu	Jako	Condorul
Foresta Suceava	(Romania) Florentin Petre	(Romania) Marius Matei	Macron	Primăria Suceava
Hermannstadt	(Romania) Alexandru Pelici	(Romania) Răzvan Dâlbea	Andu	Primăria Sibiu
Luceafărul Oradea	(Romania) Cristian Lupuț	(Romania) Claudiu Codoban	Adidas	—
Metaloglobus București	(Romania) Alin Chița	(Romania) Ștefan Stângă	Jako	—
Mioveni	(Romania) Iordan Eftimie	(Brazil) Roberto Ayza	Joma	Primăria Mioveni
Olimpia Satu Mare	—	—	—	—
Pandurii Târgu Jiu	(Romania) Adrian Bogoi	(Romania) Răzvan Stanca	Luanvi / Nike	CEO, Artego
Ripensia Timișoara	(Romania) Ciprian Urican	(Romania) Adrian Popa	ILA	Labormed Alvogen
Sportul Snagov	(Romania) Valeriu Răchită	(Romania) Alexandru Radu	Givova / Macron	AD Garage
Știința Miroslava	(Romania) Romeo Butnaru	(Romania) Ciprian Milea	Givova / Joma	Primăria Miroslava
Târgu Mureș	—	—	—	—
UTA Arad	(Romania) Ionuț Popa	(Romania) Marius Curtuiuș	Saller	Pletl

== Managerial changes ==
Team	Outgoing manager	Manner of departure	Date of vacancy	Position in table	Incoming manager	Date of appointment
Hermannstadt	(Romania) Eugen Beza	No PRO licence	31 May 2017	Pre-season	(Romania) Alexandru Pelici	1 June 2017
Argeș	(Romania) Nicolae Dică	Signed by FCSB	31 May 2017	Pre-season	(Romania) Iordan Eftimie	1 July 2017
Pandurii	(Romania) Flavius Stoican	Signed by CSM Poli Iași	8 June 2017	Pre-season	(Romania) Mihai Teja	3 August 2017
Foresta	(Romania) Marius Lup (caretaker)	End of tenure as a caretaker	30 June 2017	Pre-season	(Romania) Florin Cristescu	3 August 2017
Olimpia	(Romania) Bogdan Andone	Signed by ASU Politehnica	30 June 2017	Pre-season	(Romania) Tibor Selymes	1 July 2017
ASU Politehnica	(Romania) Sorin Brîndescu	Mutual agreement	30 June 2017	Pre-season	(Romania) Bogdan Andone	1 July 2017
Mioveni	(Romania) Iordan Eftimie	Signed by Argeș Pitești	30 June 2017	Pre-season	(Romania) Florin Marin	1 July 2017
Târgu Mureș	(Romania) Ionel Ganea	End of contract	30 June 2017	Pre-season	(Romania) László Balint	1 July 2017
Luceafărul	(Romania) Alexandru Kiss	End of contract	30 June 2017	Pre-season	(Romania) Cornel Țălnar	1 July 2017
UTA Arad	(Romania) Laurențiu Roșu	End of contract	30 June 2017	Pre-season	(Romania) Adrian Mihalcea	1 July 2017
Dunărea	(Romania) Adrian Mihalcea	Signed by UTA Arad	30 June 2017	Pre-season	(Romania) Adrian Iencsi	1 July 2017
Snagov	(Romania) Mihai Stoica	End of contract	30 June 2017	Pre-season	(Romania) Valeriu Răchită	1 July 2017
Balotești	(Romania) Augustin Călin	Mutual agreement	20 July 2017	Pre-season	(Romania) Cornel Nica	4 August 2017
Pandurii	(Romania) Mihai Teja	Murual agreement	8 August 2017	12	(Romania) Adrian Iencsi	8 August 2017
Dunărea	(Romania) Adrian Iencsi	Signed by Pandurii	8 August 2017	17	(Romania) Mirel Condei (caretaker)	9 August 2017
Balotești	(Romania) Cornel Nica	Sacked	13 August 2017	18	(Romania) Laurențiu Diniță	14 August 2017
Dunărea Călărași	(Romania) Mirel Condei (caretaker)	End of tenure as a caretaker	22 August 2017	17	(Romania) Dan Alexa	22 August 2017
Foresta	(Romania) Florin Cristescu	Mutual agreement	31 August 2017	20	(Portugal) Nuno Pedro	1 September 2017
Luceafărul	(Romania) Cornel Țălnar	Sacked	31 August 2017	18	(Romania) Cristian Dulca	1 September 2017
UTA Arad	(Romania) Adrian Mihalcea	Mutual agreement	4 September 2017	9	(Romania) Adrian Falub	6 September 2017
Mioveni	(Romania) Florin Marin	Resigned	5 September 2017	12	(Romania) Adrian Mihalcea	7 September 2017
Târgu Mureș	(Romania) László Balint	Mutual agreement	5 September 2017	3	(Romania) Carol Fekete (caretaker)	9 September 2017
Olimpia	(Romania) Tibor Selymes	Resigned	18 September 2017	16	(Romania) Zoltan Ritli	18 September 2017
Târgu Mureș	(Romania) Carol Fekete (caretaker)	End of tenure as a caretaker	20 September 2017	3	(Romania) Marius Popescu	20 September 2017
UTA Arad	(Romania) Adrian Falub	Mutual agreement	21 September 2017	13	(Romania) Cristian Todea	21 September 2017
Mioveni	(Romania) Adrian Mihalcea	Signed by Romania	23 September 2017	7	(Romania) Gheorghe Mihali	24 September 2017
Pandurii	(Romania) Adrian Iencsi	Sacked	30 September 2017	13	(Romania) Marcel Ploaie (caretaker)	30 September 2017
Miroslava	(Romania) Cristian Ungureanu	Sacked	10 October 2017	17	(Romania) Adrian Kerezsy	11 October 2017
Foresta	(Portugal) Nuno Pedro	Mutual agreement	20 October 2017	19	(Romania) Marius Lup (caretaker)	20 October 2017
Foresta	(Romania) Marius Lup (caretaker)	End of tenure as caretaker	23 October 2017	19	(Romania) Florentin Petre	23 October 2017
Ripensia	(Romania) Remus Steop	Resigned	23 October 2017	10	(Romania) Radu Suciu (caretaker)	24 October 2017
Balotești	(Romania) Laurențiu Diniță	Resigned	26 October 2017	18	(Romania) Emil Stanca (caretaker)	26 October 2017
Argeș	(Romania) Iordan Eftimie	Sacked	6 November 2017	10	(Romania) Augustin Eduard (caretaker)	6 November 2017
Pandurii	(Romania) Marcel Ploaie (caretaker)	End of tenure as caretaker	6 November 2017	16	(Romania) Adrian Bogoi	6 November 2017
Mioveni	(Romania) Gheorghe Mihali	Sacked	6 November 2017	8	(Romania) Mihai Olteanu (caretaker)	6 November 2017
Mioveni	(Romania) Mihai Olteanu (caretaker)	End of tenure as caretaker	14 November 2017	8	(Romania) Laurențiu Roșu	14 November 2017
Balotești	(Romania) Emil Stanca (caretaker)	End of tenure as a caretaker	28 November 2017	18	(Romania) Augustin Călin	28 November 2017
Ripensia	(Romania) Radu Suciu (caretaker)	End of tenure as a caretaker	10 December 2017	11	(Romania) Paul Codrea	13 December 2017
Argeș	(Romania) Augustin Eduard (caretaker)	End of tenure as a caretaker	10 December 2017	7	(Romania) Emil Săndoi	5 January 2018
Academica	(Romania) Erik Lincar	Signed by Juventus București	13 December 2017	6	(Romania) Ilie Poenaru	30 December 2017
Metaloglobus	(Romania) Bogdan Vintilă	Mutual agreement	15 December 2017	15	(Romania) Alin Chița	5 January 2018
Târgu Mureș	(Romania) Marius Popescu	Mutual agreement	10 January 2018	8	—	—
Olimpia	(Romania) Zoltan Ritli	Mutual agreement	30 January 2018	20	—	—
ASU Politehnica	(Romania) Bogdan Andone	Resigned	14 March 2018	7	(Romania) Antonio Foale (caretaker)	16 March 2018
Luceafărul	(Romania) Cristian Dulca	Signed by Șirineasa	20 March 2018	13	(Romania) Cristian Lupuț	20 March 2018
Ripensia	(Romania) Paul Codrea	Mutual agreement	25 March 2018	13	(Romania) Radu Suciu (caretaker)	25 March 2018
Ripensia	(Romania) Radu Suciu (caretaker)	Mutual agreement	7 April 2018	12	(Romania) Ciprian Urican	7 April 2018
Mioveni	(Romania) Laurențiu Roșu	Sacked	26 April 2018	8	(Romania) Iordan Eftimie (caretaker)	26 April 2018
UTA Arad	(Romania) Cristian Todea	Mutual agreement	26 April 2018	10	(Romania) Ionuț Popa	26 April 2018
Miroslava	(Romania) Adrian Kerezsy	Sacked	16 May 2018	17	(Romania) Romeo Butnaru (caretaker)	18 May 2018
Balotești	(Romania) Augustin Călin	Mutual agreement	16 May 2018	9	(Romania) Emil Stanca (caretaker)	17 May 2018

== League table ==
Pos	Team	Pld	W	D	L	GF	GA	GD	Pts	Promotion or relegation
1	Dunărea Călărași (C, P)	38	29	6	3	75	24	+51	93	Promotion to Liga I
2	Hermannstadt (P)	38	27	10	1	66	13	+53	91	Promotion to Liga I
3	Chindia Târgoviște	38	21	12	5	71	28	+43	75	Qualification to promotion play-off
4	Argeș Pitești	38	20	8	10	61	35	+26	68 (Note: ARG-AFU 2-1; AFU-ARG 1-1)	
5	Afumați (Note: Afumați withdrew from Liga II after the end of the season and was enrolled instead in the Liga III, a move made due to financial reasons.) (D, R)	38	20	8	10	53	32	+21	68	Withdrew
6	Academica Clinceni	38	16	10	12	63	54	+9	58	
7	ASU Politehnica Timișoara (Note: ASU Politehnica Timișoara were deducted 3 points because the team withdrew from the pitch in the match played on 24 April 2018 against UTA Arad. Also it lost the match by forfeit.)	38	18	6	14	55	43	+12	57	
8	Luceafărul Oradea	38	15	8	15	65	59	+6	53	
9	Mioveni	38	14	10	14	54	46	+8	52	
10	Sportul Snagov	38	14	9	15	51	37	+14	51	
11	Ripensia Timișoara	38	13	9	16	72	58	+14	48	
12	UTA Arad	38	12	11	15	60	55	+5	47 (Note: UTA-BAL 2-2; BAL-UTA 2-2)	
13	Balotești	38	13	8	17	54	74	−20	47	
14	Pandurii Târgu Jiu	38	9	15	14	49	57	−8	42	
15	Dacia Unirea Brăila	38	11	8	19	70	72	−2	41 (Note: DUB-MET 2-1; MET-DUB 0-1)	
16	Metaloglobus București	38	11	8	19	38	55	−17	41	
17	Știința Miroslava (R)	38	10	7	21	44	73	−29	37	Relegation to Liga III
18	Foresta Suceava (R)	38	10	3	25	35	106	−71	33	Relegation to Liga III
19	Târgu Mureș (Note: Târgu Mureș went bankrupt during the winter break and lost all matches from the second part by forfeit.) (D, R)	37	9	4	24	38	85	−47	31	Withdrew
20	Olimpia Satu Mare (Note: Olimpia Satu Mare were deducted 70 points for unpaid debts, withdrew from the championship during the winter break and lost all the matches from the second part by forfeit.) (D, R)	37	6	2	29	19	87	−68	−50	Withdrew

Source: FRF (in Romanian)
Rules for classification: 1st points; 2nd head-to-head points; 3rd head-to-head goal difference; 4th head-to-head goals scored; 5th head-to-head away goals scored; 6th goal difference; 7th number of goals scored.
(C) Champions; (D) Disqualified; (P) Promoted; (R) Relegated

== Season results ==
Home \ Away	ACA	AFU	ARG	ASU	BAL	CHI	DUB	DUN	FOR	HER	LUC	MET	MIO	OLI	PAN	RIP	SNA	MIR	TGM	UTA
Academica Clinceni		0–2	2–4	2–3	5–2	0–2	2–1	4–1	2–0	0–1	1–2	4–1	3–1	3–0	3–1	2–1	2–1	0–0	3–0	0–3
Afumați	1–0		1–1	2–1	4–1	0–0	2–0	0–1	3–0	0–1	2–1	2–1	2–1	3–0	2–1	2–0	1–1	1–1	3–0	2–0
Argeș Pitești	1–1	2–1		2–0	2–3	0–0	1–0	2–0	0–2	0–0	3–0	3–0	0–1	2–1	0–0	2–1	1–0	3–0	1–2	1–0
ASU Politehnica Timișoara	2–2	2–1	2–1		2–2	1–2	2–1	0–1	2–0	0–1	2–0	0–2	1–0	3–0	1–1	2–1	1–0	1–0	3–0	2–1
Balotești	1–4	0–0	1–0	2–1		0–0	2–1	1–2	3–1	0–3	2–2	2–0	0–3	2–0	0–2	3–1	1–0	1–2	2–6	2–2
Chindia Târgoviște	1–0	2–1	2–4	2–0	4–1		2–0	2–2	6–0	1–1	2–1	3–0	3–0	3–0	1–0	1–0	1–0	2–0	3–0	0–1
Dacia Unirea Brăila	5–2	1–2	3–1	2–3	2–2	1–0		1–1	9–1	0–6	1–1	2–1	2–2	3–0	1–1	2–2	0–1	1–4	3–0	3–4
Dunărea Călărași	4–0	2–1	2–1	2–0	2–1	0–0	2–0		3–1	0–0	1–0	1–0	1–1	5–1	3–1	3–1	2–0	6–0	3–0	2–1
Foresta Suceava	0–1	0–1	0–2	2–2	2–1	1–1	1–0	0–2		0–3	3–0	1–1	2–0	3–0	3–2	1–2	0–11	2–3	0–6	2–3
Hermannstadt	2–0	0–0	1–0	1–0	3–0	0–0	3–2	2–1	2–0		4–0	0–0	2–1	3–0	1–0	2–0	2–0	1–0	3–0	2–0
Luceafărul Oradea	1–1	1–2	3–2	2–1	4–1	2–1	3–4	1–2	3–0	0–0		2–0	0–1	2–1	3–1	1–2	1–1	1–1	3–0	3–2
Metaloglobus București	0–0	0–3	1–1	0–5	5–1	1–1	0–1	0–2	2–1	0–3	1–0		2–1	0–1	2–3	2–1	2–1	1–2	4–0	0–0
Mioveni	1–1	4–0	0–0	1–1	3–1	2–2	0–1	1–3	2–0	1–1	3–2	0–1		3–0	0–4	1–2	2–2	5–1	2–1	1–1
Olimpia Satu Mare	1–1	0–2	0–3	0–2	0–3	1–3	3–2	0–3	2–0	2–0	0–3	0–3	0–3		0–3	1–1	0–3	0–3		1–0
Pandurii Târgu Jiu	1–2	1–1	1–5	1–1	1–1	3–3	3–3	0–3	0–1	1–3	1–1	1–0	2–1	0–1		1–1	1–1	1–0	3–0	1–1
Ripensia Timișoara	3–3	2–1	1–1	0–2	1–2	2–3	2–1	1–1	16–0	0–1	4–4	4–1	0–1	3–0	1–2		2–0	3–0	3–2	1–1
Sportul Snagov	1–1	2–0	1–2	1–0	1–0	1–2	3–1	0–1	2–0	0–2	0–3	2–0	0–1	2–0	0–0	1–1		1–0	3–0	0–0
Știința Miroslava	1–2	0–0	2–3	2–1	1–2	0–9	4–4	0–1	0–1	1–3	1–4	1–1	1–0	2–1	1–1	3–0	2–3		3–0	1–2
Târgu Mureș	1–1	0–1	0–3	0–3	0–3	0–0	2–1	0–3	0–3	2–2	3–2	0–3	0–3	4–2	4–1	0–3	1–1	2–1		0–3
UTA Arad	1–3	2–1	0–1	3–0	2–2	2–1	1–5	0–1	8–1	1–1	2–3	0–0	1–1	3–0	2–2	2–3	1–4	3–0	1–2	

Source: Liga 2
Legend: Blue = home team win; Yellow = draw; Red = away team win.

== Promotion/relegation play-offs ==
The 12th-placed team of the Liga I faces the 3rd-placed team of the Liga II.

Team 1	Agg.	Team 2	1st leg	2nd leg
Voluntari	1–1 (3–0 p)	Chindia Târgoviște	1–0	0–1 (a.e.t.)

9 June 2018	Voluntari	1–0	Chindia Târgoviște	Voluntari
19:00	I.Balaur 79'			Stadium: Anghel Iordănescu; Attendance: 1,200; Referee: Radu Petrescu (Bucharest)

13 June 2018	Chindia Târgoviște	1–0 (a.e.t.)	Voluntari	Târgoviște
17:30	D.Ciobotariu 68'			Stadium: Eugen Popescu; Attendance: 5,000; Referee: István Kovács (Carei)

Notes:

- Voluntari qualified for 2018–19 Liga I and Chindia Târgoviște qualified for 2018–19 Liga II.

== Season statistics ==
=== Top scorers ===
Updated to matches played on 2 June 2018.

Rank	Player	Club	Goals
1	(Romania) Vlad Rusu	Luceafărul Oradea	26
2	(Romania) Valentin Alexandru	Dunărea Călărași	24
3	(Senegal) Mediop Ndiaye	Ripensia Timișoara	19
4	(Romania) Bogdan Rusu	Hermannstadt	18
5	(Romania) Valentin Ghenovici	Metaloglobus București	16
6	(Romania) Cristian Cherchez	Chindia Târgoviște	15
7	(Romania) Marius Matei	Luceafărul Oradea (1) / Foresta Suceava (13)	14
7	(Romania) Deian Sorescu	ASU Politehnica Timișoara	14
9	(Romania) Cosmin Năstăsie	Mioveni	13
9	(Romania) Alexandru Pop	Dacia Unirea Brăila	13

=== Clean sheets ===
Updated to matches played on 2 June 2018.

Rank	Player	Club	Clean sheets^{*}
1	(Romania) Cătălin Căbuz	Hermannstadt	20
2	(Romania) Cezar Lungu	Dunărea Călărași	17
3	(Romania) Iustin Popescu	Chindia Târgoviște	14
4	(Romania) Andrei Marinescu	Afumați	12
5	(Romania) Cosmin Dur-Bozoancă	ASU Politehnica Timișoara	9
6	(Romania) Flavius Croitoru	Mioveni	8
6	(Romania) Robert Geantă	Metaloglobus București	8
8	(Romania) Octavian Popescu	Argeș Pitești	7
9	(Romania) Iulian Anca-Trip	Sportul Snagov	6
9	(Romania) Răzvan Began	Luceafărul Oradea (0) / Foresta Suceava (6)	6
9	(Romania) Nicușor Grecu	Argeș Pitești	6
9	(Romania) Toma Niga	Academica Clinceni (2) / Hermannstadt (4)	6

^{*}Only goalkeepers who played all 90 minutes of a match are taken into consideration.

== Attendance ==
Pos	Team	Total	High	Low	Average	Change
1	Hermannstadt	47,700	5,000	1,000	2,806	n/a^{6}
2	Argeș Pitești	34,200	7,000	300	1,900	n/a^{6}
3	Chindia Târgoviște	31,400	5,000	200	1,847	−7.8%
4	Dunărea Călărași	29,150	3,000	150	1,534	+284.5%
5	ASU Politehnica Timișoara	17,765	8,000	300	987	−35.6%
6	Foresta Suceava	15,800	2,000	200	878	−45.2%
7	Mioveni	11,650	3,500	100	613	−4.8%
8	Luceafărul Oradea	7,600	1,000	100	447	−2.8%
9	UTA Arad	7,200	800	100	400	−51.1%^{1}
10	Olimpia Satu Mare	3,550	850	50	355	−36.6%
11	Dacia Unirea Brăila	6,000	1,000	100	353	−0.3%
12	Ripensia Timișoara	5,325	800	100	296	n/a^{6}
13	Pandurii Târgu Jiu	5,200	600	150	289	−54.0%^{1;5}
14	Târgu Mureș	3,000	500	50	273	−79.3%^{5}
15	Știința Miroslava	3,664	644	60	193	n/a^{6;2}
16	Balotești	2,650	300	50	139	−45.9%^{3}
17	Academica Clinceni	2,200	600	20	122	−3.9%
18	Metaloglobus București	2,080	225	50	109	n/a^{6}
19	Sportul Snagov	1,940	400	50	108	−37.9%^{4}
20	Afumați	1,690	300	50	99	−56.4%
	League total	239,764	8,000	20	691	+2.7%

Updated to games played on 2 June 2018
Source: League matches: Liga II 2017/2018
Notes:
1: UTA Arad and Pandurii Târgu Jiu played all matches out of their stadiums, which are under construction.
2: Știința Miroslava played three matches out of their stadium until it was renovated to meet Liga II standards.
3: Balotești played four matches out of their stadium.
4: Sportul Snagov played nine matches out of their stadium, which is under renovations.
5: Pandurii Târgu Jiu and Târgu Mureș played last season in the Liga I.
6: Argeș Pitești, Hermannstadt, Metaloglobus București, Ripensia Timișoara and Știința Miroslava played last season in the Liga III.
