= Robert Asăvoaei =

Romanian footballer

Personal information
- Full name: Robert Gabriel Asăvoaei
- Date of birth: 2 October 1998 (age 28)
- Place of birth: Iași, Romania
- Height: 1.71 m (5 ft 7 in)
- Positions: Attacking midfielder; winger

Team information
- Current team: Dante Botoșani
- Number: 97

Youth career
- –2016: Politehnica Iași

Senior career*
Years	Team	Apps	(Gls)
2017–2018	Politehnica Iași	1	(0)
2017–2018	→ Știința Miroslava (loan)	18	(3)
2018–2019	SCM Gloria Buzău	6	(3)
2019	Ozana Târgu Neamț	15	(1)
2020–2021	Știința Miroslava	17	(7)
2021–2022	Politehnica Iași	13	(2)
2022–	Dante Botoșani	0	(0)
- * Club domestic league appearances and goals as of 11:44, 22 June 2022 (UTC)

Robert Gabriel Asăvoaei (born 2 October 1998) is a Romanian professional footballer who plays as an attacking midfielder for Dante Botoșani.

== Club career ==
=== Politehnica Iași ===
Asăvoaei made his debut at senior level for Politehnica Iași, on 5 June 2017, in a 1–1 draw against Târgu Mureș.

For the second part of the 2017–18 season Politehnica loaned the young Asăvoaei to Liga II club Știința Miroslava, in order for him to get more playing time.

Asăvoaei is known for scoring a scorpion kick in November 2020, while playing for Știința Miroslava.

== Honours ==
SCM Gloria Buzău

- Liga III: 2018–19
