= Imilian Șerbănică =

Romanian footballer

Personal information
- Date of birth: 24 July 1956 (age 70)
- Place of birth: Bucharest, Romania
- Position: Midfielder

Team information
- Current team: Academica Clinceni (youth center manager)

Youth career
- Sportul Studențesc

Senior career*
| Years | Team | Apps | (Gls) |
| 1974–1976 | Autobuzul București | | (3) |
| 1976–1977 | Politehnica Iași | 22 | (1) |
| 1977–1987 | Sportul Studențesc | 204 | (3) |
| 1986 | → Brașov (loan) | 30 | (3) |
| 1987–1988 | UTA Arad | 25 | (1) |
| 1988–1989 | Brașov | | |
| Total | | 281 | (11) |

Managerial career
- 1997: Sportul Studențesc
- 1998: Sportul Studențesc
- 1998–2001: Fulgerul Bragadiru
- 2003–2005: Callatis Mangalia
- 2005–2006: Dacia Unirea Brăila
- 2006–2007: Dunărea Giurgiu
- 2007–2008: Poiana Câmpina
- 2010–2011: Astra II Giurgiu
- 2011: Astra II Giurgiu (assistant)
- 2011–2012: Astra II Giurgiu
- 2012: Inter Clinceni
- 2012: Râmnicu Vâlcea
- 2013–2014: Inter Clinceni
- 2018–2022: Academica Clinceni (youth center manager)
- 2021: Academica Clinceni (assistant)
- * Club domestic league appearances and goals as of 14 November 2019

Imilian Șerbănică (born 24 July 1956) is a Romanian former professional footballer who played as a midfielder for teams such as Autobuzul București, Sportul Studențesc or FCM Brașov, among others. After retirement, Șerbănică started his football manager career and led from the technical bench, teams such as Sportul Studențesc, Fulgerul Bragadiru, Callatis Mangalia or Dunărea Giurgiu, currently being the youth center manager of Liga I side Academica Clinceni.

== Honours ==
=== Player ===
Sportul Studențesc

- Cupa României: Runner-up 1978–79
- Balkans Cup: 1979–80
- Balkans Cup: Runner-up 1976

=== Manager ===
Fulgerul Bragadiru

- Divizia C: 1999–2000
