= Constantin Giurescu =

Constantin Giurescu may refer to:

- Constantin Giurescu (historian) (1875–1918), Romanian historian, titular member of the Romanian Academy
- Constantin C. Giurescu (1901–1977), Romanian historian, member of the Romanian Academy, and professor at the University of Bucharest
- Constantin Giurescu (football manager) (born 1981), Romanian football manager
