= Adrian Ilie (footballer, born 1981) =

Romanian footballer

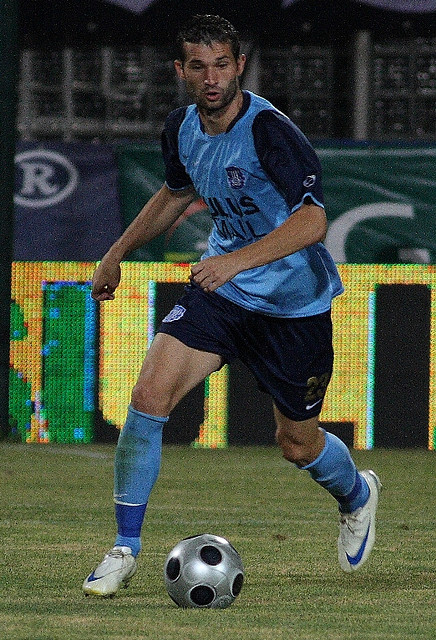

Personal information
- Full name: Adrian Ilie
- Date of birth: 26 November 1981 (age 44)
- Place of birth: Iaşi, Romania
- Height: 1.77 m (5 ft 9 1/2 in)
- Position: Centre back

Senior career*
Years	Team	Apps	(Gls)
2002–2006	Politehnica Iaşi	71	(1)
2006–2007	Politehnica Timișoara	2	(0)
2006–2007	→ Jiul Petroşani (loan)	11	(0)
2007	→ Politehnica Iaşi (loan)	20	(0)
2008–2010	Politehnica Iaşi	30	(0)
2010–2011	Zakho FC		
2015	Știința Miroslava		
2015	Rapid Dumeşti		
2016	Știința Miroslava		
2017–2021	Bradu Borca	177	(4)
- * Club domestic league appearances and goals as of 1 October 2017

Adrian Ilie (born 26 November 1981 in Iaşi) is a Romanian football player. He plays as a central defender, but can also play as a defensive midfielder or as a left back.

Ilie started football in his home town, working his way up from the Politehnica Iaşi youth and before his transfer to Timișoara in winter 2006 he had only played for the Iași based team.

He did not manage to hold down a first team spot though and has been subsequently sent on loan.
