= CS Știința Miroslava =

Romanian football club

Știința Miroslava
- Full name: Clubul Sportiv Știința Miroslava
- Nickname: Alb-albaștrii (The White-Blues)
- Short name: Știința
- Founded: 2009; 17 years ago
- Ground: Comunal
- Capacity: 500 (seated)
- Owner: Miroslava Commune
- General manager: Mugurel Ilisei
- Head coach: Liviu Petrache
- League: Liga IV
- 2025–26: Liga III, Seria I, 6th (administrative relegation)
- Website: http://stiintamiroslava.ro/
Home colours	Away colours

Clubul Sportiv Știința Miroslava, commonly known as Știința Miroslava or simply Miroslava, is a Romanian football club based in Miroslava, Iași County. Founded in 2009, it currently plays in Liga IV, the fourth tier of Romanian football.

== History ==
Știința Miroslava was founded in 2009 at the initiative of Dan Niță, mayor of Miroslava commune within the Iași metropolitan area, and was enrolled in Liga V – Iași County, the fifth tier of the Romanian football league system and the second at county level. Under the guidance of coach Corneliu Costăchescu, the team earned promotion to the fourth tier at the end of the 2009–10 season, after winning Series I.

Costăchescu led Știința to a 2nd-place finish in their first season in Liga IV – Iași County. In January 2012 he was replaced by Florin Croitoru, under whom the team again finished as runners-up in the 2011–12 campaign, both times behind Rapid Dumești. However, since the team from Dumești did not have the right to promote, Știința played the promotion play-off against Microbuzul Botoșani, winning 3–1 on neutral ground at Tineretului Stadium in Gura Humorului and earning promotion to Liga III for the first time. The squad was composed of Bărgan, Dulcianu, Avădanei, Ghiarasim, Tăcuțanu, Miron, Ionescu, Lenghen, Ciubotariu, Talanca, Palaghia, H. Popa, Chiper, Grigoriu, Pricop, Apetri, Cruceanu, Barbu, Dumitriu, Ipate, Cotovanu and Acatrinei.

In Liga III, Știința Miroslava was assigned to Series I. The debut was tough, and after the first half of the season the team was in a relegation spot. Florin Croitoru was replaced by Cristian Ungureanu during the winter break, but the White-Blues eventually finished 10th in 2012–13 and was relegated.. However, they were spared from relegation due to the withdrawal of other teams. In the 2013–14 season they finished 4th in the regular season and 3rd at the end of the second stage.

In the 2014–15 campaign, Știința came close to promotion, finishing 2nd, just two points behind Bucovina Pojorâta after losing 1–2 away in the final round. The squad included, among others, Bârlădeanu, Avram, Sărițanu, Baciu, Sacrieru, Tăcuțanu, Ilie, Maxim, Tudorache, Munteanu, Azaharioaei, Șchiopu, Gheorghiu, Lipovanu, Botezatu, Talpan, Ghiarasim, Tofan, and Petrea.

The 2015–16 season was another very good one for the Miroslava team, which won all its home matches without conceding a single goal and finished 3rd under the leadership of Daniel Munteanu, after Ungureanu left the team in January.

The 2016–17 Liga III season was highly competitive in Series I. Munteanu was sacked at the end of October with Știința in 7th place, and Cristian Ungureanu took over as head coach after a short interim by Irinel Ionescu, guiding the team on a strong run back into promotion contention. With only one round remaining, Csíkszereda Miercurea Ciuc led the championship with 63 points, followed by AFC Hărman with 62 points and Știința with 61. Știința played away at Miercurea Ciuc and won 1–0, but also needed AFC Hărman not to win against CSM Pașcani, another team from Iași County at the bottom of the table. AFC Hărman led 1–0 until the 90+1st minute, when Jan Turiță, Pașcani's goalkeeper, scored to make it 1–1, securing promotion for Miroslava to Liga II for the first time in the club’s short history. The squad included Anton, Țintea, Drăgan, Moisi, Cerneuțanu, Dulcianu, Tăcuțanu, Maxim, Sărițanu, Huțanu, Taciuc, Săvoaia, Munteanu, Chelaru, Tanană, Agrigoroaei, Chelaru, Chiriac, Izmană, Botezatu, Crengăniș, Văleanu, Al. Marin, Ambrosie, Nemțanu, and Sandu.

The debut in the second division was challenging for Știința, as the team played its first three matches at Emil Alexandrescu Stadium while the stadium from Uricani was under renovation, and even suffered a heavy 0–9 defeat against Chindia Târgoviște. Ungureanu was sacked after eleven rounds and replaced by Adrian Kereszy, who led the team through the 2017–18 campaign. However, following modest results, he left the team, which was then guided by youth coach Romeo Butnaru in the final three rounds, and the team was relegated one round before the end of the season after a 1–4 home defeat to Luceafărul Oradea, finishing in 17th place.

Former Moldovan national team player Viorel Frunză took charge for the 2018–19 Liga III season, leading the team to a 4th-place finish in Series I and to the Fourth Round of the Cupa României, where it lost 0–2 to Bucovina Rădăuți. The squad included Turiță, Bîlbă, Tăcuțanu, Bucur, Vlădeanu, Agrigoroaei, Milea, Bordeianu, Săvoaia, Iovu, Sandu, Chirilă, Dodan, Nemțanu, Al. Marin, Botezatu, Cerneuțanu, and Gorovei.

Știința started the 2019–20 season with Florin Croitoru and Laurențiu Sinescu on the bench, but both were replaced after three rounds by Cristian Popovici. The season was suspended in March 2020 due to the COVID-19 pandemic, with Știința placed 7th in Series I at the time of the interruption. In the Cupa României, the team was eliminated in the Second Round after a 2–3 defeat to Unirea Mircești.

Cristian Popovici continued in charge during the 2020–21 season, leading Miroslava to a 4th-place finish in Series I of Liga III. In the Cupa României, Știința reached the Third Round, where they were eliminated following a 1–2 loss to Hușana Huși. The squad included, among others, Turiță, Daniliuc, Vlădeanu, Corduneanu, Croitoriu, Bacanamwo, Nemțanu, Asăvoaei, Benchea, Asofiei, Săvoaia, Florean, Unghianu, Martinescu, I. Popescu, Pipoș, E. Sandu, Viorică, R. Costin, I. Munteanu, R. Alexandru, Bordeianu, and Obananaya.

The 2021–22 campaign began with Popovici as head coach, but he was dismissed after five rounds due to poor results in Series I of Liga III and another elimination by Hușana Huși, 1–2, in the Third Round of the Cupa României. The team was then led by interim coach Denis Crețu until the winter break, when Daniel Stoica was appointed head coach. He guided Știința to an 8th-place finish in the regular season, but was dismissed after four rounds of the relegation play-out, with Liviu Petrache taking charge for the final matches and ultimately finishing 8th.

The former Romanian national team player Tibor Selymes was appointed head coach for the 2022–23 season, leading Știința Miroslava to a 5th-place finish after the regular and play-out stages of Series I. The team also reached the Third Round of the Cupa României, but lost 1–3 to Politehnica Iași.

In the 2023–24 campaign, Selymes led the team to a 3rd-place finish after the regular season, but was dismissed after four rounds of the Series I play-off. The team was then led for the last five matches by assistant coach Cosmin Popescu, assisted by goalkeeping coach Benone Dohot, eventually finishing in 4th place.

Although Dorian Marin was announced as head coach in July 2024, he became technical director when Cristian Popovici returned as head coach for the 2024–25 campaign, leading Știința to a runners-up finish after both the regular and the play-off stages of Series I, qualifying for the promotion play-offs. However, the White-Blues were eliminated in the first round by Unirea Braniștea, losing 1–2 at home and 3–4 away in the second leg, played in Galați. The squad included, among others, Feșteu, Ababei, Ngong Charm, Țimbalariu, Mbengue, D. Petrișor, Cozma, Granja, Saizu, Mihăeș, Unghianu, Bogleș, Olăeru, Ungurenașu, Niamțu, João Makanda, Nemțanu, Takoutsing Fotsing, Finica, and Șovea.

Popovici departed Știința in September after three rounds of the 2025–26 campaign and was replaced by Romeo Butnaru, who led the White-Blues until October. After a brief interim period with technical director Dorian Marin, Liviu Petrache was appointed head coach.

== Honours ==
Liga III:

- Winners (1): 2016–17
- Runners-up (2): 2014–15, 2024–25

Liga IV – Iași County

- Runners-up (2): 2010–11, 2011–12

Liga V – Iași County

- Winners (1): 2009–10

== Players ==
=== First team squad ===
As of 10 September 2024

Note: Flags indicate national team as defined under FIFA eligibility rules; some limited exceptions apply. Players may hold more than one non-FIFA nationality.

No.	Pos.	Nation	Player
1	GK	ROU	Matei Manea
2	DF	ROU	Cosmin Ciuclea
3	DF	ROU	Dragoș Ungurenașu (on loan from Poli Iași)
4	DF	ROU	Victor Petrișor
5	DF	CMR	Kevin Kuang
6	MF	CMR	Ojong Beyang
7	FW	ROU	Cosmin Nemțanu
8	DF	ROU	Enrichi Finica
9	FW	ROU	André Cozma
10	MF	ROU	Petru Corobuță
11	MF	ROU	Giani Unghianu
13	FW	ROU	Tiberiu Șovea
14	MF	COL	Ronald Granja

No.	Pos.	Nation	Player
16	DF	ROU	Lorenzo Lupu
17	MF	ROU	Robert Niamțu
23	DF	ROU	Cosmin Saizu
25	DF	ROU	Vasilică Mihăeș (Captain)
33	GK	ROU	Ștefan Ceaușu
71	MF	CMR	Desmond Ngong
77	MF	ROU	Marian Țîmbalariu
80	DF	ROU	David Petrișor
91	DF	ROU	Iulian Iurașcu
93	MF	ROU	Rareș Achiței
95	GK	ROU	David Feșteu
96	MF	ROU	Mattia Bogleş
99	MF	ROU	Diego Fărcaș (on loan from Poli Iași)

=== Out on loan ===
Note: Flags indicate national team as defined under FIFA eligibility rules; some limited exceptions apply. Players may hold more than one non-FIFA nationality.

No. / Pos. / Nation / Player	No. / Pos. / Nation / Player

== Club officials ==
=== Board of directors ===
Role	Name
Owner	(Romania) Miroslava Commune
President	(Romania) Alexandru Vieru
Vice-Presidents	(Romania) Marius Deliu (Romania) Gheorghiță Iftimie
General manager	(Romania) Mugurel Ilisei
Sporting director	(Romania) Cătălin Popa
Youth Center Manager	(Romania) Liviu Petrache
Responsible for order and safety	(Romania) Constantin Stoica

=== Current technical staff ===
Role	Name
Technical director	(Romania) Dorian Marin
Head coach	(Romania) Liviu Petrache
Assistant coaches	(Romania) Andrei Hergheligiu (Romania) Vasilică Mihăeș
Goalkeeping coach	(Romania) Cristian Blaga
Fitness coach	(Romania) Denis Timofte
Masseur	(Romania) Constantin Vieriu
Video analyst	(Romania) Emi Isac
Club Doctors	(Romania) Valeriu Chirica (Romania) Petre Crivoi (Romania) Constantin Daradici

== Former managers ==
- (Romania) Corneliu Costăchescu (2009–2011)
- (Romania) Florin Croitoru (2012)
- (Romania) Cristian Ungureanu (2012–2015)
- (Romania) Daniel Munteanu (2016)
- (Romania) Cristian Ungureanu (2016–2017)
- (Romania) Adrian Kereszy (2017–2018)
- (Romania) Romeo Butnaru (2018)
- (Moldova) Viorel Frunză (2018–2019)
- (Romania) Florin Croitoru (2019)
- (Romania) Cristian Popovici (2019–2021)
- (Romania) Denis Crețu (2021) interim
- (Romania) Daniel Stoica (2022)
- (Romania) Tibor Selymes (2022–2024)
- (Romania) Cosmin Popescu (2024) interim
- (Romania) Cristian Popovici (2024–2025)
- (Romania) Romeo Butnaru (2025)
- (Romania) Liviu Petrache (2025–)

== League and Cup history ==
Season	Tier	Division	Place	Notes	Cupa României
2025–26	3	Liga III (Seria I)	TBD		Second Round
2024–25	3	Liga III (Seria I)	2nd		First Round
2023–24	3	Liga III (Seria I)	4th		First Round
2022–23	3	Liga III (Seria I)	5th		Third Round
2021–22	3	Liga III (Seria I)	8th		Third Round
2020–21	3	Liga III (Seria I)	4th		Third Round
2019–20	3	Liga III (Seria I)	7th		Second Round
2018–19	3	Liga III (Seria I)	4th		Fourth Round
2017–18	2	Liga II	17th	Relegated	Round of 32

Season	Tier	Division	Place	Notes	Cupa României
2016–17	3	Liga III (Seria I)	1st (C)	Promoted	Fourth Round
2015–16	3	Liga III (Seria I)	3rd		
2014–15	3	Liga III (Seria I)	2nd		
2013–14	3	Liga III (Seria I)	3rd		
2012–13	3	Liga III (Seria I)	10th		
2011–12	4	Liga IV (IS)	2nd	Promoted	
2010–11	4	Liga IV (IS)	2nd		
2009–10	5	Liga V (IS)	1st (C)	Promoted	
