= Stadionul Orășenesc (Buftea) =

Football stadium in Buftea, Romania

Coordinates: 44°33′59″N 25°57′6″E

Stadionul Orăşenesc
- Interactive map of Stadionul Orăşenesc
- Location: Buftea, Romania
- Owner: Buftea Municipality
- Operator: Voința Buftea
- Capacity: 1,500
- Surface: Grass

Construction
- Renovated: 2005–2007

Tenants
- CS Buftea (2007–2013); Voința Buftea (2014–Present); Berceni (2016)

Stadionul Orăşenesc is a multi-use stadium in Buftea, Romania. It is currently used mostly for football matches and is the home ground of Voința Buftea. The stadium holds 1,500 people.
