= Mario Pipoș =

Romanian professional footballer

Personal information
- Full name: Mario Rafaelo Pipoș
- Date of birth: 2 February 2001 (age 25)
- Place of birth: Romania
- Height: 1.80 m (5 ft 11 in)
- Position: Forward

Youth career
- 2007–2014: Politehnica Iași
- 2014–2018: Sporting Vaslui

Senior career*
Years	Team	Apps	(Gls)
2018–2022	Sporting Vaslui	2	(0)
2018–2019	→ Politehnica Iași (loan)	3	(0)
2019–2020	→ Foresta Suceava (loan)	8	(0)
2020–2021	→ Știința Miroslava (loan)	4	(0)
- * Club domestic league appearances and goals as of 07:01, 21 June 2022 (UTC)

Mario Rafaelo Pipoș (born 2 February 2001) is a Romanian professional footballer who plays as a forward.

== Club career ==
In the summer of 2018, Pipoș moved to Liga I club Politehnica Iași. On 6 April 2019, he made his professional debut by coming in as a substitute in a 1–0 away victory against Hermannstadt.
