= Enrichi Finica =

Footballer (born 2002)

Eric Finica
Personal information
- Full name: Enrichi Finica
- Date of birth: 19 July 2002 (age 24)
- Place of birth: Chișinău, Moldova
- Height: 1.77 m (5 ft 10 in)
- Position: Left-back

Team information
- Current team: Știința Miroslava
- Number: 8

Youth career
- –2018: FC Juniorul București
- 2018–2019: Torino

Senior career*
Years	Team	Apps	(Gls)
2019–2024	Rapid București	17	(0)
2021	→ Unirea Constanța (loan)	3	(0)
2022–2023	→ Politehnica Iași (loan)	20	(1)
2023–2024	→ Alexandria (loan)	4	(0)
2024–	Știința Miroslava	0	(0)

International career^{‡}
2020	Moldova U19	1	(0)
2022–2023	Romania U20	3	(0)
- * Club domestic league appearances and goals as of 14:00, 12 November 2024 (UTC) ‡ National team caps and goals as of 27 March 2023

Enrichi Finica (born 19 July 2002), also known as Eric Finica, is a Romanian professional footballer who plays as a left-back for Liga III club Știința Miroslava.

== Club career ==
Finica made his debut on 16 May 2022 for Rapid București in Liga I match against CS Mioveni.

== Honours ==
Politehnica Iași

- Liga II: 2022–23
