= SCM Dunărea Giurgiu =

Romanian football club

Dunărea
- Full name: Sport Club Municipal; Dunărea Giurgiu
- Nicknames: Giurgiuvenii (The People from Giurgiu); Acvilele albastre (The Blue Eagles); Alb-albaștrii (The White and Blues); Gruparea de la Dunăre (The Danube Group)
- Short name: Dunărea Giurgiu
- Founded: 1948; 78 years ago 2013; 13 years ago (refounded)
- Ground: Marin Anastasovici
- Capacity: 8,500
- Owner: Giurgiu Municipality
- Chairman: Mirel Marin
- Head coach: Bogdan Vintilă
- League: Liga III
- 2025–26: Liga III, Seria V, 8th
Home colours	Away colours

Sport Club Municipal Dunărea Giurgiu, commonly known as SCM Dunărea Giurgiu or Dunărea Giurgiu, is a Romanian professional football club based in the city of Giurgiu, Giurgiu County and currently playing in the Liga III, the 3rd tier of the Romanian football league system.

The team was founded in 1948 and until the summer of 2010 it was known as FC Dunărea Giurgiu. Then it was renamed Astra II after it was bought by Ioan Niculae, owner of Liga I squad FC Astra Giurgiu. In the summer of 2012 the club was dissolved after its owner decided to cut back on expenses. Then the club was refounded in the summer of 2013 as CSM Dunărea Giurgiu.

== History ==
Founded in 1948, with players from Dragaje and Acvila, two small clubs from Giurgiu, Dunărea played for several years in the districts and regional championships.

In the 1960–61 season, led by Lucian Mititelu, Dunărea won the Bucharest Regional Championship and qualified for promotion play-offs in the second division, but lost the promotion finishing in the 3rd place behind CFR Arad and Carpați Sinaia, in a series in who also played Flacăra Roșie București, Muscelul IMS Câmpulung and Dinamo Craiova. Also, Dunărea reached the first round proper of the Romanian Cup, but lost in front of Progresul București 0–4. The squad of Dunărea during the championship and the play-offs matches was composed of: Manole, Gheorghiu, Drăgănescu, Nemțescu, Iorgulescu, Ghiță, Pană, Albu, IIiuță, Stan, Nicu, Rotărescu, Năsturescu, Nania, Grozea, Negrilă and Vasile Ene.

In the summer of 1963, the club merged with Victoria Giurgiu, newly promoted to Divizia C, and played in the South Series of the third tier, finishing 2nd in the 1963–64 season and 3rd in the 1964–65 season. The two clubs separated in 1965, and the shipyard team was renamed Dunărea, continuing to compete in the third division, where it finished 5th in 1965–66 and 4th in 1966–67.

After five consecutive seasons in the third tier, Dunărea managed to promote for the first time to Divizia B at the end of the 1967–68 season, winning the South Series after a strong battle with Progresul Brăila. Led by Gheorghe Gîrlea for most of the season and by Nicolae Nemțescu towards the end, the Dunărea squad included Penescu, Piticu, Ghibănescu, Iacob, Lungu, Cristache, Ghiță, Cojocaru, State, D. Ion, Borțea, Grădinaru, Nania, Mustață, Trăistaru, Anghel, Constantin, E. Ilie, Clepcea, C. Sandu, Budurincă, Marin, Mănăilă, P. Nicolae, and Țigănilă.

In the second division, Dunărea successively occupied 12th in 1968–69 season, and during the same campaign the team also reached the Round of 32 in the Cupa României, drawing 2–2 after extra time at home against Rapid București but being eliminated because the regulations stated that, in case of a draw, the away team advanced. This was followed by 13th in 1969–70, 6th in 1970–71, 11th in 1971–72, and 12th in 1972–73, before being relegated at the end of the 1973–74 season after finishing 16th in Series II.

Dunărea spent only one season in the third division, earning a quick promotion by winning Series V of the 1974–75 Divizia C under coach Tinel Popescu. Renamed FCM Giurgiu (Fotbal Club Muncitoresc, “Workers’ Football Club”), the team had a solid 1975–76 season, finishing 6th, followed by 10th in 1976–77, and 11th in 1977–78 with Viorel Popescu as head coach, who was replaced by Ștefan Roman the following season when the team ranked 10th, and last place in 1979–80, which resulted in relegation at the end of the season.

Dunărea achieved promotion to Divizia B after a twenty-five-year absence at the end of the 2004–05 season, topping Series III of Divizia C. The team was led by head coach Marcel Ploaie, with Ciprian Ulea as assistant coach, and included Ene, G. Barbu, Rusu, Tănase, Câțu, Manea, Peicu, Fodor, Matei, Ruse, Vasile, Mulțescu, Cr. Ion, Cojenel, Gheorghe, Sandu, Nistorache, Ioniță, Zamfir, and Lascarache.

The team was refounded in the summer of 2013 under the multisport club Sport Club Municipal Dunărea Giurgiu and competed under the leadership of former player Constantin Sandu in the South Series of Liga IV – Giurgiu County, finishing 2nd in the 2013–14 season and losing 0–2 in the championship semifinals to Petrolul Roata Cartojani. In the following seasons, Dunărea ranked 4th in 2014–15 and 1st in 2015–16, with Marcel Abăluță as head coach, but was eliminated in the semifinals after a 1–1 draw and a 5–6 penalty loss to Avântul Florești.

In the 2016–17 season, the team finished 2nd and, after defeating Petrolul Roata de Jos 2–1 in the semifinals, Dunărea won the county title by beating CS Mihai Bravu 2–0 in the final, qualifying for the promotion play-off to Liga III, where they lost 2–3 on aggregate (2–2 at home and 0–1 away) to Agricola Borcea, the Călărași County champions.

Dunărea Giurgiu appointed Andrei Nemțescu as head coach in July 2022 for the 2022–23 season. Under his leadership, the team finished first in the South Series, qualifying for the championship play-offs, where they defeated Singureni 2–0 in the semifinals and Viitorul Tântava 2–0 in the final, winning the Giurgiu County Liga IV title. They secured promotion to Liga III after the play-off against Bărăganul Ciulnița, the Ialomița County champions, with a 1–1 away draw and a 6–1 home victory. The squad included, among others, Stancu, Mitrea, Calea, Blaga, Popescu, Lungu, Matache, Cazaciuc, Florescu, Țangulea, Mizdrescu, Diceanu, Bălțat, G. Gheorghe, Arpetin, Constantinescu, and Pasăre.

In the 2023–24 Liga III season, Dunărea finished 4th in both the regular season and the play-off round of Series IV, while in the 2024–25 season they ranked 6th in the regular season and 9th in the play-out round, being spared from relegation due to the withdrawal of other teams and appointing Bogdan Vintilă as the new head coach.

== Honours ==
Liga III

- Winners (3): 1967–68, 1974–75, 2004–05
- Runners-up (3): 1963–64, 2002–03, 2003–04

Liga IV – Giurgiu County

- Winners (4): 1992–93, 1993–94, 2016–17, 2022–23
- Runners-up (1): 2021–22

== Players ==
=== First team squad ===
As of 10 September 2024

Note: Flags indicate national team as defined under FIFA eligibility rules; some limited exceptions apply. Players may hold more than one non-FIFA nationality.

No.	Pos.	Nation	Player
1	GK	ROU	Octavian Stanciu (Captain)
2	DF	ROU	Andrei Mitrea
3	DF	ROU	Tiberiu Cazacu
4	DF	ROU	Cristian Lobonț
5	MF	ROU	David Anghel
6	MF	ROU	David Leon
7	MF	ROU	Marinel Blaga (Vice-Captain)
8	MF	ROU	Adrian Radu
9	FW	ROU	Andrei Bălțat
10	MF	ROU	Răzvan Mizdrescu
11	MF	ROU	Vlad Șerbănescu
12	GK	GUI	Amadou Camara
13	MF	ROU	Răzvan Anghel
14	MF	ROU	Luigi Zamfir
15	MF	ROU	Cristian Ungureanu

No.	Pos.	Nation	Player
16	MF	ROU	Daniel Gheorghe
17	MF	ROU	Marius Costache
19	FW	ROU	Mario Văduva
20	MF	ROU	Mihai Coșeru
21	MF	ROU	Tudor Chiriac
23	DF	CMR	Aboubacar Campaore
24	FW	ROU	Ionuț Pitulice
25	DF	ROU	Adrian Bălăceanu
30	MF	ROU	Denis Pașcu
33	FW	ROU	Daniel Dicianu (on loan from Rapid)
34	MF	ROU	Octavian Zlate
77	MF	ROU	Sorin Mănăilă
88	FW	ROU	Tony Constantin
98	GK	ROU	Luca Urucu

=== Out on loan ===
Note: Flags indicate national team as defined under FIFA eligibility rules; some limited exceptions apply. Players may hold more than one non-FIFA nationality.

No. / Pos. / Nation / Player	No. / Pos. / Nation / Player

== Club Officials ==
=== Board of directors ===
Role	Name
Owner	(Romania) Giurgiu Municipality
President	(Romania) Mirel Marin
Organizer of Competitions	(Romania) Daniel Ignat
Delegate	(Romania) Marius Marinescu

=== Current technical staff ===
Role	Name
Head coach	(Romania) Bogdan Vintilă
Assistant coach	(Romania) Dan-Bogdan Constantin
Goalkeeping coach	(Romania) Cătălin Florin Naipeanu

== Former managers ==
- (Romania) Valentin Stănescu (1955–1958)
- (Romania) Constantin Marinescu (1965–1967)
- (Romania) Constantin Marinescu (1969–1971)
- (Romania) Octavian Popescu (1972–1973)
- (Romania) Ștefan Onisie (1975–1977)
- (Romania) Marcel Ploaie (2004–2006)
- (Romania) Imilian Șerbănică (2006–2007)
- (Romania) John Ene (2007–2008)
- (Romania) Marin Barbu (2008–2010)
- (Romania) Emil Ursu (2010)
- (Romania) Imilian Șerbănică (2010–2011)
- (Romania) Vasile Cosarek (2012)
- (Romania) Ioan Tătăran (2012)
- (Romania) Marcel Abăluță (2015–2016)
- (Romania) Andrei Nemțescu (2022–2025)
- (Romania) Bogdan Vintilă (2025–)

== League and Cup history ==
Season	Tier	Division	Place	Notes	Cupa României
2025–26	3	Liga III (Seria V)	TBD		
2024–25	3	Liga III (Seria IV)	9th	Spared (R)	Third Round
2023–24	3	Liga III (Seria IV)	4th		
2022–23	4	Liga IV (GR) (South Series)	1st (C)	Promoted	
2021–22	4	Liga IV (GR) (South Series)	2nd	Final	
2020–21	4	Liga IV (GR) (Zone I)	1st	Semi-finals	
2019–20	4	Liga IV (GR) (South Series)	3rd		
2018–19	4	Liga IV (GR) (South Series)	6th		
2017–18	4	Liga IV (GR) (South Series)	2nd	Semi-finals	
2016–17	4	Liga IV (GR) (South Series)	2nd (C)		
2015–16	4	Liga IV (GR) (South Series)	1st	Semi-finals	
2014–15	4	Liga IV (GR) (South Series)	4th		
2013–14	4	Liga IV (GR) (South Series)	2nd	Semi-finals	
2012–13	2	Liga II (Seria I)	16th	Dissolved	
2011–12	2	Liga II (Seria I)	11th		Round of 16
2010–11	2	Liga II (Seria I)	9th		Round of 32
2009–10	2	Liga II (Seria I)	9th		Round of 32
2008–09	2	Liga II (Seria I)	11th		

Season	Tier	Division	Place	Notes	Cupa României
2007–08	2	Liga II (Seria I)	7th		
2006–07	2	Liga II (Seria I)	9th		
2005–06	2	Divizia B (Seria II)	5th		
2004–05	3	Divizia C (Seria III)	1st (C)	Promoted	
2003–04	3	Divizia C (Seria III)	2nd		
2002–03	3	Divizia C (Seria III)	4th		
2001–02	3	Divizia C (Seria IV)	5th		
2000–01	3	Divizia C (Seria IV)	7th		
1999–00	3	Divizia C (Seria III)	7th		
1998–99	3	Divizia C (Seria II)	10th		
1997–98	3	Divizia C (Seria II)	16th		
1996–97	3	Divizia C (Seria II)	9th		
1995–96	3	Divizia C (Seria II)	6th		
1994–95	4	Divizia D (GR)	1st (C)	Promoted	
1993–94	4	Divizia D (GR)	1st (C)		
1991–92	3	Divizia C (Seria VI)	12th	Relegated	
1990–91	3	Divizia C (Seria V)	13th		
1989–90	3	Divizia C (Seria V)	9th		
