= Cosmin Saizu =

Romanian professional footballer

Personal information
- Full name: Cosmin Gabriel Saizu
- Date of birth: 8 March 2003 (age 23)
- Place of birth: Iași, Romania
- Height: 1.93 m (6 ft 4 in)
- Position: Defender

Team information
- Current team: Știința Miroslava
- Number: 23

Youth career
- Politehnica Iași

Senior career*
Years	Team	Apps	(Gls)
2020–2022	Politehnica Iași		
2021–2022	→ Știința Miroslava (loan)	5	(0)
2022–	Știința Miroslava	51	(0)
- * Club domestic league appearances and goals as of 14:05, 12 November 2024 (UTC)

Cosmin Saizu (born 8 March 2003) is a Romanian professional footballer who plays as a defender for Știința Miroslava. He made his Liga I debut on 7 November 2020, in a match between FC Voluntari and Politehnica Iași, won by Voluntari, score 4–0.
