= John Ene =

Romanian footballer (1971–2023)

Personal information
- Full name: John Adrian Ene
- Date of birth: 1 January 1971
- Place of birth: Dragomirești-Vale, Romania
- Date of death: 22 March 2023 (aged 52)
- Height: 1.78 m (5 ft 10 in)
- Position: Goalkeeper

Team information
- Current team: Academica Clinceni (GK Coach)

Youth career
- –1989: Steaua București

Senior career*
Years	Team	Apps	(Gls)
1989–1991	Ceahlăul Piatra Neamț		
1991–1996	Brașov	74	(0)
1997–2002	Tractorul Brașov		
2003	Lushnja	4	(0)
2003–2007	Dunărea Giurgiu	73	(0)
2012	Dunărea Oinacu	4	(0)
Total		155	(0)

Managerial career
- 2004–2007: Dunărea Giurgiu (GK Coach)
- 2007–2008: Dunărea Giurgiu
- 2008–2010: Dunărea Giurgiu (GK Coach)
- 2010: Astra Ploiești (GK Coach)
- 2010–2012: Astra II Giurgiu (GK Coach)
- 2012–2015: Inter Clinceni (GK Coach)
- 2015–2016: Academica Clinceni (GK Coach)
- 2016–2017: Academica Clinceni
- 2017–2022: Academica Clinceni (GK Coach)
- 2021: → Academica Clinceni (caretaker)
- 2022: → Academica Clinceni (caretaker)
- * Club domestic league appearances and goals

John Adrian Ene (1 January 1971 – 22 March 2023) was a Romanian football player and coach. As a goalkeeper, Ene played in the top-flight for FC Brașov and in the second tier for Dunărea Giurgiu. After retirement, he worked as a goalkeeping coach or manager for teams such as Dunărea Giurgiu, Astra Ploiești or Academica Clinceni.

== Career ==
Ene was goalkeeping coach at Liga IV side Academica Clinceni.

== Death ==
Ene died on 22 March 2023, aged 52, after suffering a heart attack.
