= Irinel Ionescu =

Romanian footballer

Personal information
- Full name: Irinel Ioan Ionescu
- Date of birth: 25 December 1978 (age 47)
- Place of birth: Iași, Romania
- Height: 1.84 m (6 ft 0 in)
- Position: Centre back

Youth career
- 1988–1996: Politehnica Iași

Senior career*
Years	Team	Apps	(Gls)
1996–2007	Politehnica Iași	165	(8)
2001–2002	→ Metalul Plopeni (loan)	40	(0)
2007–2008	Focșani	24	(0)
2008–2009	Cetatea Suceava	5	(0)
2009–2010	Rapid Dumești		
2015–2016	Flacăra Erbiceni		
Total		234	(8)

Managerial career
- 2013–2015: Știința Miroslava (assistant)
- 2015–2016: Flacăra Erbiceni
- 2016: Știința Miroslava (caretaker)
- 2017: Știința Miroslava (assistant)
- 2017–2019: Știința Miroslava (youth)
- 2020–: Sportul Iași (youth)
- * Club domestic league appearances and goals as of 24 April 2020

Irinel Ioan Ionescu (born 25 December 1978) is a Romanian former footballer who played as a centre back mainly for Politehnica Iași, but also for teams such as Metalul Plopeni, CSM Focșani or Cetatea Suceava, among others.

After retirement, Ionescu started a career as a football manager and worked for Știința Miroslava and Flacăra Erbiceni.

== Honours ==
=== Player ===
Politehnica Iași

- Divizia B: Winner (1) 2003–04

Rapid Dumești

- Liga IV – Iași County: Winner (1) 2009–10

Flacăra Erbiceni

- Liga V – Iași County: Winner (1) 2015–16

=== Manager ===
Flacăra Erbiceni

- Liga V – Iași County: Winner (1) 2015–16

Știința Miroslava

- Liga III: Winner (1) 2016–17
