= Joël Bacanamwo =

Belgian footballer (born 1998)

Personal information
- Date of birth: 23 May 1998 (age 28)
- Place of birth: Brussels, Belgium
- Height: 1.75 m (5 ft 9 in)
- Position: Defender

Youth career
- KVK Tienen
- Sint-Truidense

Senior career*
Years	Team	Apps	(Gls)
2018–2019	Tubize	6	(0)
2020–2021	Știința Miroslava	13	(0)
2022	RRC Stockay-Warfusée	12	(0)
2022–	Solières Sport	14	(1)

International career
2019–	Burundi	3	(0)
- * Club domestic league appearances and goals as of 30 April 2021

Joël Bacanamwo (born 23 May 1998) is a Burundian footballer, who plays as a defender. Born in Belgium, Bacanamwo represents the Burundi national football team internationally.

== Career ==
Bacanamwo started playing football at the age of 7. At the age of 10, he joined K.V.K. Tienen-Hageland. He later joined Sint-Truidense at the age of 15. In November 2018, he signed his first professional contract with A.F.C. Tubize.

== International career ==
Bacanamwo was born in Brussels, Belgium, on 23 May 1998 to Burundian parents who had fled from the outbreak of civil war in Burundi in 1993. He grew up in Brussels until he was 6 years old before his family moved to Landen.

Bacanamwo represented the Burundi national football team in a 1-1 2022 FIFA World Cup qualification tie with Tanzania on 4 September 2019.
