= Ciprian Milea =

Romanian footballer

Personal information
- Full name: Ciprian Ștefan Milea
- Date of birth: 12 July 1984 (age 42)
- Place of birth: Galați, Romania
- Height: 1.77 m (5 ft 10 in)
- Position: Attacking midfielder

Team information
- Current team: Știința Miroslava
- Number: 25

Senior career*
Years	Team	Apps	(Gls)
2004–2007	Dunărea Galați	85	(17)
2007–2010	Politehnica Iași	53	(2)
2011	Oțelul Galați	0	(0)
2011	Petrolul Ploiești	4	(0)
2012–2013	CSMS Iași	43	(7)
2013–2015	Oțelul Galați	34	(1)
2015–2016	Farul Constanţa	26	(1)
2016–2017	Metalosport Galați	?	(?)
2017	Farul Constanța	26	(1)
2018–	Știința Miroslava	13	(0)
- * Club domestic league appearances and goals as of 12 January 2019

Ciprian Ștefan Milea (born 12 July 1984) is a Romanian footballer who plays as a midfielder for Știința Miroslava.
