= Bogdan Vintilă =

Romanian footballer and manager

Personal information
- Full name: Bogdan Argeș Vintilă
- Date of birth: 27 February 1972 (age 54)
- Place of birth: Bucharest, Romania
- Height: 1.86 m (6 ft 1 in)
- Position: Goalkeeper

Youth career
- 1978–1990: Metalul București
- 1990–1993: Steaua București

Senior career*
Years	Team	Apps	(Gls)
1993–1995	Argeș Pitești	64	(0)
1995–1996	Rapid București	13	(0)
1996–1999	Argeș Pitești	105	(0)
2000–2003	Naţional București	95	(0)
2003–2004	Bursaspor	12	(0)
2005–2007	Argeș Pitești	42	(0)
2007–2009	Concordia Chiajna	38	(0)
Total		369	(0)

International career
1990–1993	Romania U21	20	(0)
2002	Romania	5	(0)

Managerial career
- 2010: Concordia Chiajna
- 2010–2011: Galatasaray (assistant)
- 2012–2013: Viitorul Constanța (assistant)
- 2013–2014: Viitorul Constanța
- 2014: Viitorul Constanța (caretaker)
- 2014–2015: Romania U17
- 2015: Voluntari
- 2016–2017: Metaloglobus București
- 2018: Astra Giurgiu (assistant)
- 2019–2020: FCSB
- 2020–2021: FCSB II
- 2022–2023: Concordia Chiajna (youth center manager)
- 2023: Argeș Pitești
- 2025–2026: Dunărea Giurgiu
- * Club domestic league appearances and goals

Bogdan Argeș Vintilă (born 27 February 1972) is a Romanian professional football manager and former player who last managed Liga III club Dunărea Giurgiu.

== Playing statistics ==
Appearances and goals by national team and year
National team	Year	Apps	Goals
Romania	2002	5	0
Total		5	0

== Managerial statistics ==
As of match played 3 June 2023

Team	From	To	Record							
Team	From	To	G	W	D	L	GF	GA	GD	Win %
(Romania) Concordia Chiajna	1 September 2010	23 October 2010	2	1	1	0	3	1	+2	50.00
(Romania) Viitorul Constanța	12 September 2013	27 June 2014	32	12	8	12	31	44	−13	37.50
(Romania) Viitorul Constanța (caretaker)	21 August 2014	15 September 2014	3	1	1	1	3	2	+1	33.33
Romania U17	21 November 2014	3 April 2015	3	0	0	3	1	7	−6	0.00
(Romania) Voluntari	1 July 2015	14 August 2015	6	0	4	2	3	8	−5	0.00
(Romania) Metaloglobus București	12 July 2016	15 December 2017	49	24	8	17	68	61	+7	48.98
(Romania) FCSB	23 August 2019	15 July 2020	33	18	7	8	51	31	+20	54.55
(Romania) FCSB II	15 July 2020	30 June 2021	20	13	3	4	44	24	+20	65.00
(Romania) Argeș Pitești	15 March 2023	20 June 2023	12	4	1	7	15	20	−5	33.33
(Romania) Dunărea Giurgiu	21 July 2025	Present	0	0	0	0	0	0	+0	—
Total			160	73	33	54	219	198	+21	45.63

== Honours ==
Argeș Pitești

- Divizia B: 1993–94

Național București

- Cupa României runner-up: 2002–03
