= Comunal Stadium (Uricani) =

Multi-use stadium in Uricani, Romania

Uricani Stadium
- Știința
- Interactive map of Uricani Stadium
- Address: Centura Iași
- Location: Uricani, Romania
- Coordinates: 47°09′38.9″N 27°29′5.9″E
- Owner: Commune of Miroslava
- Operator: Știința Miroslava
- Capacity: 500 (seated)
- Surface: Grass

Construction
- Opened: 2009

Tenant
- Știința Miroslava (2009–present)

The Uricani Stadium is a multi-use stadium in Uricani, Romania. It is used mostly for football matches and is the home ground of Știința Miroslava. The stadium has a seating capacity of 500 people.
