= Mihai Olteanu =

Romanian footballer

Personal information
- Full name: Mihai Olteanu
- Date of birth: 14 April 1980 (age 46)
- Place of birth: Piteşti, Romania
- Height: 1.89 m (6 ft 2 1/2 in)
- Position: Defender

Team information
- Current team: Mioveni (assistant)

Youth career
- 1990–2002: CSS Aripi Piteşti

Senior career*
Years	Team	Apps	(Gls)
2002–2003	Forestierul Stâlpeni	?	(?)
2003–2014	Mioveni	286	(16)

Managerial career
- 2014–: Mioveni (assistant)
- 2017: Mioveni (caretaker)
- * Club domestic league appearances and goals as of 10 January 2019

Mihai Olteanu (born 14 April 1980 in Piteşti) is a former Romanian footballer., he played all his career for CS Mioveni.
