= Cristian Popovici =

Romanian footballer and manager

Personal information
- Full name: Cristian Daniel Popovici
- Date of birth: 13 February 1968 (age 58)
- Place of birth: Bacău, Romania
- Position: Defender

Team information
- Current team: Știința Miroslava (head coach)

Senior career*
Years	Team	Apps	(Gls)
1993–2002	FCM Bacău		

Managerial career
- 2002–2004: Aerostar Bacău
- 2004–2007: FCM Bacău
- 2008: FCM Bacău
- 2010–2011: Botoșani
- 2011: SC Bacau
- 2012: Dinamo II București
- 2012: FCM Bacău
- 2012–2013: Botoșani
- 2014–2016: SC Bacău
- 2016–2017: Foresta Suceava
- 2017–2018: Aerostar Bacău
- 2018–2019: Metaloglobus București
- 2019–2021: Știința Miroslava
- 2021–2022: Dante Botoșani
- 2022–2024: CSM Bacău
- 2024–: Știința Miroslava
- * Club domestic league appearances and goals

Cristian Popovici (born 13 February 1968) is a Romanian former professional footballer and currently a manager. As a footballer Popovici played nine years for FCM Bacău, being an important member of the team that beat Steaua București with 5-1 right on the Steaua Stadium and also had appearances in European competitions as UEFA Cup or UEFA Intertoto Cup. After retirement, Popovici started his football manager career, being well known for coaching especially teams from Bacău and Moldavia such as: Aerostar Bacău, FCM Bacău, SC Bacau, FC Botoșani or Foresta Suceava, the only interruptions consisting of two short spells at Dinamo II București and Metaloglobus București.

== Honours ==
=== Player ===
FCM Bacău

- Divizia B: Winner 1994–95

=== Manager ===
FC Botoșani

- Liga II: Winner 2012–13

Aerostar Bacău

- Liga III: Winner 2017–18
