= Constantin Giurescu (football manager) =

Romanian footballer

Personal information
- Date of birth: 16 August 1981 (age 45)
- Place of birth: Bucharest, Romania

Managerial career
- Years: Team
- 2007–2022: Sport Team București (youth coach)
- 2022: Academica Clinceni

Constantin Giurescu (born 16 August 1981) is a Romanian football manager who was most recently in charge of Academica Clinceni. Giurescu is known in Romania for his contribution in the youth sector as the founder, manager and vice-president of Sport Team Bucharest Academy.
