= Miroslava, Iași =

Miroslava
- Commune
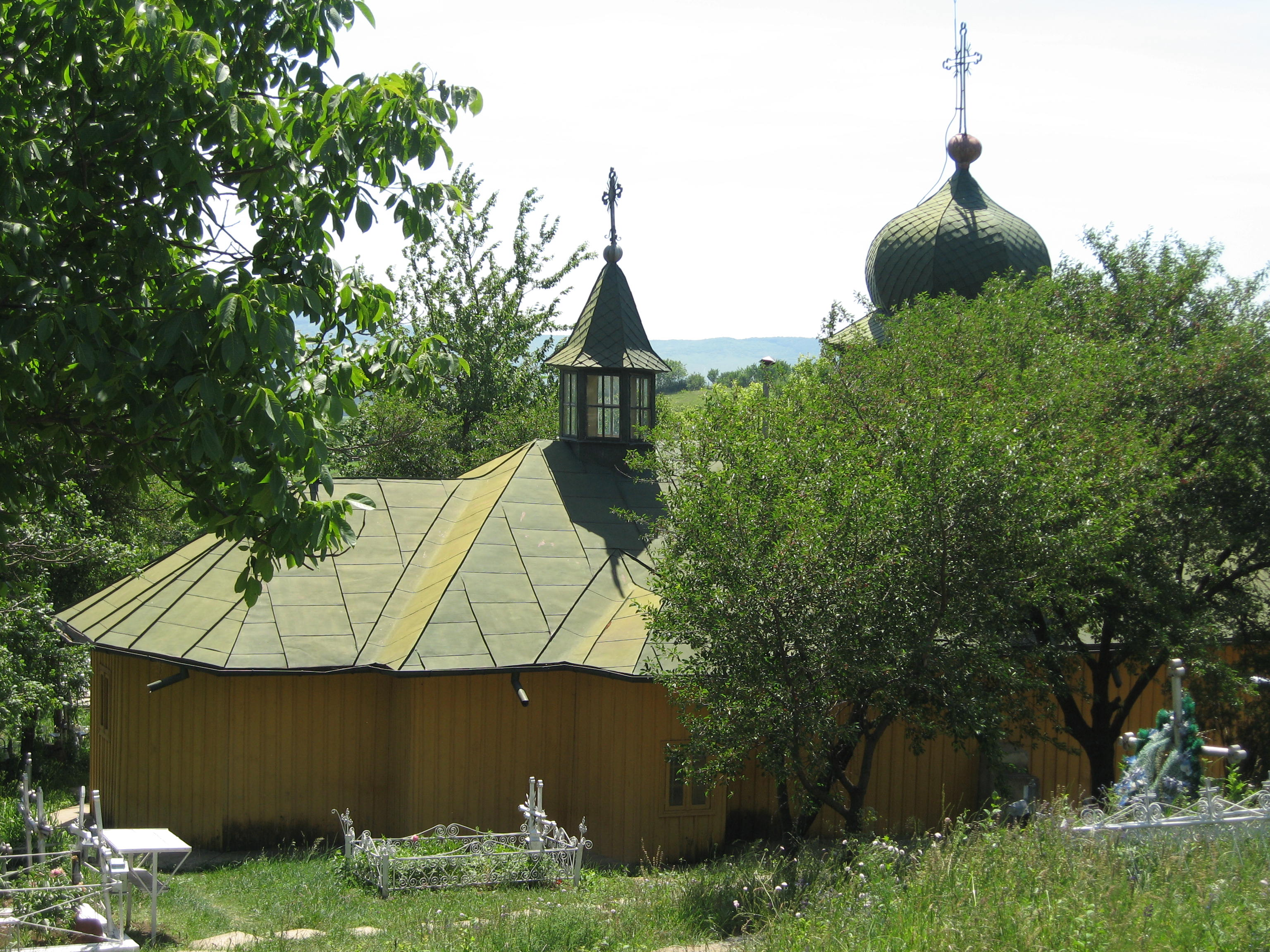
- Wooden church in Ciurbești

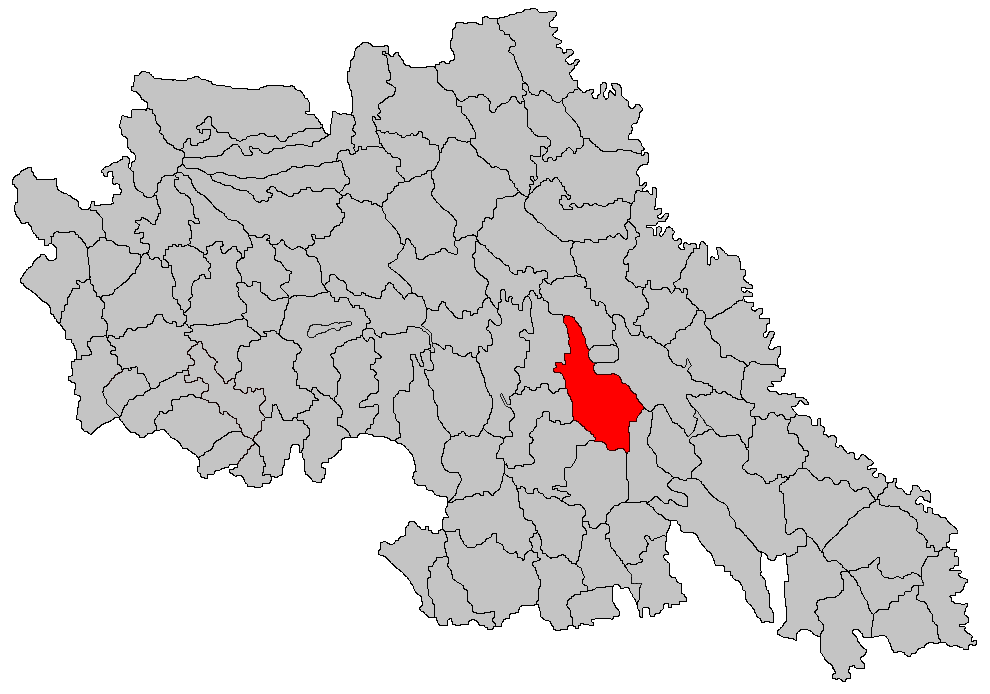
- Location in Iași County

- Location in Romania
- Coordinates: 47°9′N 27°31′E
- Country: Romania
- County: Iași

Government
  - Mayor (2020–2024): Dan Niță (PNL)
- Area: 82.57 km^{2} (31.88 sq mi)
- Elevation: 133 m (436 ft)
- Population (2021-12-01): 28,534
  - Density: 345.6/km^{2} (895.0/sq mi)
- Time zone: UTC+02:00 (EET)
  - Summer (DST): UTC+03:00 (EEST)
- Postal code: 707305
- Area code: +(40) 232
- Vehicle reg.: IS
- Website: www.primariamiroslava.ro

Miroslava is a commune in Iași County, Western Moldavia, Romania, part of the Iași metropolitan area. It is composed of thirteen villages: Balciu, Brătuleni, Ciurbești, Cornești, Dancaș, Găureni, Horpaz, Miroslava, Proselnici, Uricani, Valea Adâncă, Valea Ursului, and Vorovești.

The commune is situated in the Jijia Plain, at an altitude of 133 m (436 ft), on the banks of the river Valea Locii. It is located in the central part of the county, 7 km (4.3 mi) west of the county seat, Iași, on county road DJ248A.

== Uricani transmitter ==
At Uricani, there is a mediumwave transmitter, which transmits on 1053 kHz with a power of 1000 kW. It is one of the most powerful transmitters in Romania and uses two guyed masts insulated against ground with a height of 165 metres as antenna.

== Sport ==
The football club CS Știința Miroslava is based in the commune. Its home ground is the Comunal Stadium in Uricani.

== Natives ==
- Dimitrie Anghel (1872–1914), poet
