= Marcel Abăluță =

Romanian footballer

Personal information
- Full name: Marcel Cristian Abăluță
- Date of birth: 13 February 1971 (age 55)
- Place of birth: Bucharest, Romania
- Height: 1.78 m (5 ft 10 in)
- Position: Midfielder

Team information
- Current team: Cetatea Turnu Măgurele (manager)

Youth career
- Steaua București

Senior career*
Years	Team	Apps	(Gls)
1989–1990	Steaua București	4	(0)
1990–1992	Steaua Mizil		
1993–1996	Petrolul Ploiești	103	(9)
1996	Argeș Pitești	20	(2)
1997–2003	Farul Constanța	147	(9)
2003–2004	Callatis Mangalia	10	(0)
Total		284+	(20+)

Managerial career
- 2010: Phoenix Ulmu
- 2013–2014: Academica Clinceni (assistant)
- 2014: Academica Clinceni (caretaker)
- 2015–2016: Dunărea Giurgiu
- 2016: Berceni
- 2017: Voința Turnu Măgurele (assistant)
- 2017–2019: Daco-Getica București (assistant)
- 2019–2020: FCSB (assistant)
- 2021: Focșani (assistant)
- 2022: Tunari
- 2023: Înainte Modelu
- 2024–: Cetatea Turnu Măgurele
- * Club domestic league appearances and goals as of 11:54, 13 January 2024 (UTC)

Marcel Cristian Abăluță (born 13 February 1971) is a Romanian former professional footballer who played as a midfielder for teams such as Steaua București, Petrolul Ploiești and Farul Constanța, among others.

== Honours ==
Petrolul Ploiești

- Cupa României: 1994–95
