= Stadionul Otto Greffner =

Romanian stadium

- Interactive map of Stadionul Otto Greffner
- Address: Str. Mihai Eminescu
- Location: Șiria, Romania
- Coordinates: 46°15′59.9″N 21°38′5.9″E
- Owner: Commune of Șiria
- Operator: Șiriana Șiria
- Capacity: 2,000
- Surface: Grass

Construction
- Opened: 2011
- Renovated: 2017, 2018

Tenants
- Șiriana Șiria (2011–present); Şoimii Pâncota (2016); UTA Arad (2017–2018)

Stadionul Otto Greffner is a multi-use stadium in Șiria, Romania. It is used mostly for football matches and is the home ground of Șiriana Șiria. In the past, for a short period, it was also the home ground of UTA Arad and the now-defunct Şoimii Pâncota. The stadium holds 2,000 people. For the Liga I play-off between UTA Arad and ACS Poli Timișoara mobile stands are used to increase the stadium capacity.
