= ACS Inter Ilfov =

Romanian football club

Inter Ilfov
- Full name: Asociația Club Sportiv Inter Ilfov
- Nicknames: Ilfovenii (The People from Ilfov County)
- Short name: Inter
- Founded: 2005; 21 years ago as CS Buftea; 2022; 4 years ago as LPS HD Clinceni
- Ground: Clinceni
- Capacity: 4,500
- Manager: Valentin Bădoi
- League: Liga III
- 2025–26: Liga III, 8th (play-off)
- Website: https://interilfov.com/
Home colours	Away colours

Asociația Club Sportiv Inter Ilfov, commonly known as Inter Ilfov, is a Romanian association football club based in Clinceni, Ilfov County. It competes in Liga III, the third tier of the Romanian football league system.

Football represented by the club's page has involved two separate legal entities. The first was founded in 2005 as CS Buftea and later played as FC Clinceni, Academica Argeș and Academica Clinceni, before ceasing activity in 2022. A new organisation, LPS HD Clinceni, was established that year and continued senior football in Clinceni. The current club states that it is not the administrative or official successor of Academica Clinceni.

LPS HD Clinceni won the Ilfov County championship in 2022–23 and entered Liga III later that year after the Romanian Football Federation awarded it a vacant place. The club began using the name Inter Ilfov in 2024, while the legal change from Asociația Club Sportiv L.P.S.HD. Clinceni to Asociația Club Sportiv Inter Ilfov was recorded by the FRF on 24 June 2026.

== History ==
=== CS Buftea (2005–2013) ===
The former club was founded in 2005 as CS Buftea, following a merger between a fourth-tier team from Buftea and Cimentul Fieni. It entered Divizia C in Cimentul's place and finished sixth in Series III in its first season.

Buftea finished third in 2006–07 and second in 2007–08. It then won a promotion play-off group at Stadionul Poiana in Câmpina, ahead of Juventus București and Aerostar Bacău, and reached Liga II for the first time.

Names used
Name	Period
First entity
CS Buftea	2005–2009
ACS Buftea	2009–2013
FC Clinceni	2013–2014
Academica Argeș	2014–2015
Academica Clinceni	2015–2022
Current entity
LPS HD Clinceni	2022–2026
Inter Ilfov	2026–present

For its first Liga II season, Buftea worked with Politehnica Timișoara, receiving several players on loan, including Cristian Zimmermann, Ioan Mera, Adrian Popa, Cristian Scutaru, Artur Pătraș and Mircea Axente. The arrangement ended during the winter break, when most of the loaned players left for Gloria Buzău.

Buftea finished the 2008–09 Liga II season in thirteenth place. In July 2009, the club transferred its Liga II place to Săgeata Stejaru for €500,000 and continued in Liga III in Săgeata's former place. The team was subsequently renamed ACS Buftea.

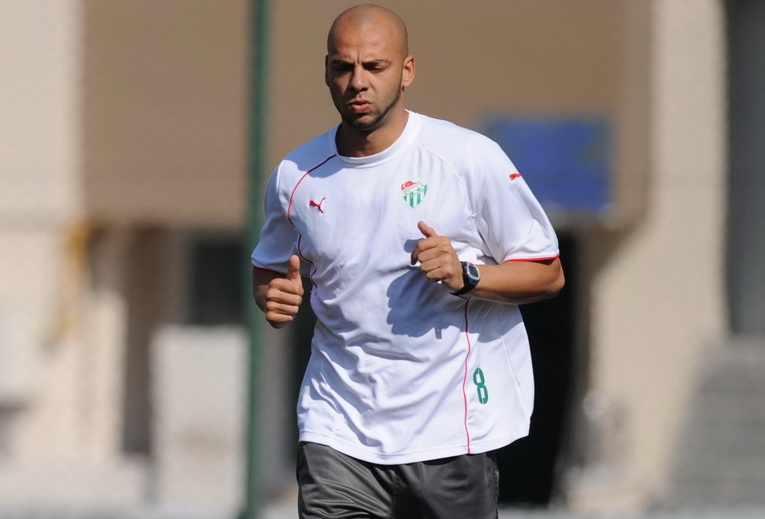
Giani Kiriță, player-manager of ACS Buftea in 2012.

After fifth and eighth-place finishes in Liga III, ACS Buftea won Series III in 2011–12, finishing level on points with Viitorul Domnești and earning promotion.

The club again encountered financial problems before the 2012–13 season. During uncertainty over its ownership, a team made up largely of youth players lost 0–31 to ACS Berceni in the Cupa României. Buftea nevertheless completed the Liga II season and finished sixth.

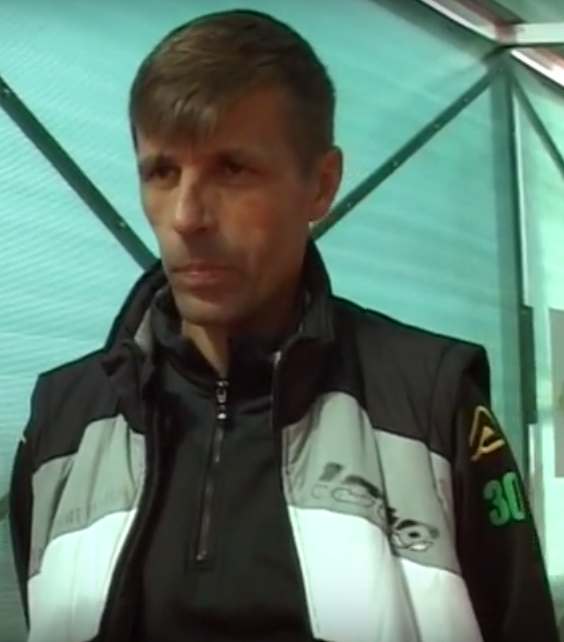
Valentin Bădoi, manager of ACS Buftea and FC Clinceni between 2012 and 2014, and Inter Ilfov head coach since 2026.

=== Clinceni and Pitești (2013–2017) ===
In August 2013, the club was taken over by the authorities of Clinceni and renamed FC Clinceni. Several players from the existing Inter Clinceni team joined the Liga II squad, while Valentin Bădoi remained head coach.

Logo used by FC Clinceni in 2013–14.

The following summer, businessman Constantin Moroianu acquired the club and moved it to Pitești. It was renamed Academica Argeș and played in white and purple under head coach Marius Baciu. Academica finished second in its 2014–15 Liga II group behind FC Voluntari, after which Moroianu withdrew and the club returned to Clinceni.

The team became Academica Clinceni in 2015. László Balint was appointed head coach, with former player Bogdan Apostu as general manager.

=== Academica Clinceni (2017–2022) ===
In 2017, Clinceni's local authorities again became involved in the club. Sorin Paraschiv was appointed general manager and Erik Lincar head coach. Academica also began working with FCSB, which sent several young players to Clinceni on loan.

Lincar was replaced by Ilie Poenaru during the 2017–18 season. Under Poenaru, Academica finished second in the 2018–19 Liga II and was promoted to Liga I for the first time. Clinceni, with a population of around 5,000 at the time, became the smallest locality to field a team in Romania's top division.

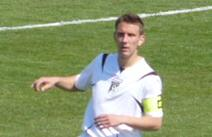
Răzvan Patriche, captain during Academica's promotion to Liga I.

Academica finished tenth in its first Liga I season. In 2020–21, it qualified for the championship play-off and ended the season in fifth place, the best league result in the club's history.

Financial problems worsened during 2021–22. The team finished fifteenth, was relegated and subsequently ceased senior activity. Plans announced in the summer of 2022 instead led to the creation of a new organisation in Clinceni.

=== LPS HD Clinceni and Inter Ilfov (2022–present) ===
LPS HD Clinceni was formed in 2022 and entered Liga IV Ilfov for the 2022–23 season. The name used the initials of former Romania goalkeeper Helmuth Duckadam. The club describes itself as a new entity and not the administrative or official successor of Academica Clinceni.

LPS HD won the Ilfov County championship in its first season. In the promotion play-off against Progresul Fundulea, it lost 0–1 at home and 1–4 away. On 24 August 2023, the FRF nevertheless admitted LPS HD Clinceni to Liga III to fill a vacant place in Series III.

The team finished fourth in Series III in 2023–24. During the summer of 2024 it began competing publicly as Inter Ilfov. Inter finished sixth in its series in 2024–25.

In 2025–26, Inter finished fourth in the regular season of Series V, with 39 points from 20 matches. The team recorded twelve wins, three draws and five defeats, scoring 44 goals, and qualified for the promotion play-off. Inter finished eighth after the play-off.

The FRF formally recorded the change of legal name from Asociația Club Sportiv L.P.S.HD. Clinceni to Asociația Club Sportiv Inter Ilfov on 24 June 2026. In July, Valentin Bădoi became head coach, with Vasile Constantin as assistant and Florin Andreescu as goalkeeping coach.

Inter was placed in Series V of the 2026–27 Liga III, together with Oxigen București, Omega Sport, Cetatea Turnu Măgurele, FCSB II, CSM Alexandria, Progresul Spartac, Progresul Mogoșoaia, Academia de Fotbal Dunărea 1948, Axi Arena, Dinamo II and Voluntari II.

In the 2026–27 Cupa României, Inter was eliminated in the first round after losing 0–3 away to Progresul Mogoșoaia on 29 July 2026.

== Youth program ==
Inter Ilfov operates youth teams from under-9 to under-19 level and also has a women's football section.

In 2024–25, the under-15 and under-16 teams both finished second in their national championships, while the under-19 team placed fifth. The club's under-10 side won the Spring Cup tournament held at the Clinceni sports complex.

Several players from the under-17 and under-19 teams were promoted to the senior squad during preparations for the 2026–27 season.

== Ground ==
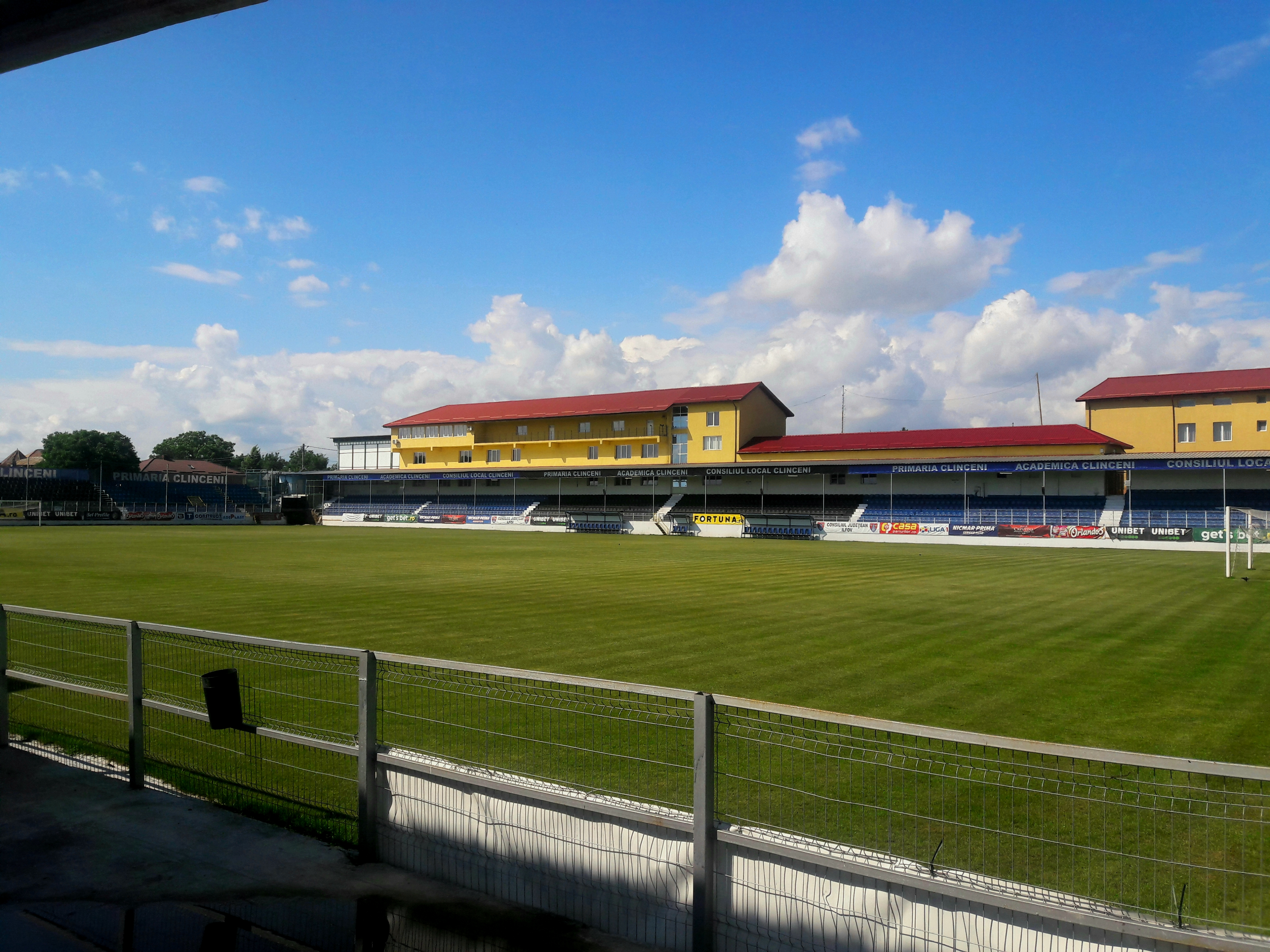
Clinceni Stadium

Both the former Academica and the current Inter Ilfov have used Stadionul Clinceni as their main home ground. The stadium is located in Clinceni and has approximately 4,500 seats.

The ground opened in 2011 as part of a larger sports complex containing several football pitches. It was initially used by the former Inter Clinceni and became the home of the Liga II club after its move from Buftea in 2013.

Academica did not use Clinceni Stadium during the 2014–15 season, when the team was based in Pitești. After returning to Clinceni in 2015, the stadium again became its home ground.

Renovation work began in 2018 as Academica challenged for promotion to Liga I. The project included improvements to the pitch, an increase in seating capacity and the installation of floodlights. The complex also contains a secondary ground which has been used for training and competitive matches.

LPS HD Clinceni and later Inter Ilfov continued to use the complex after 2022.

== Honours ==
=== First entity ===
Liga II

- Runners-up (2): 2014–15, 2018–19

Liga III

- Winners (1): 2011–12
- Runners-up (1): 2007–08

=== Current entity ===
Liga IV – Ilfov County

- Winners (1): 2022–23

== Players ==
=== First-team squad ===
As of 2 September 2026

No.	Player	No.	Player
1	(Romania) David Dumitrescu	12	(Romania) Octavian Oancea
83	(Romania) Denis Andreescu	82	(Romania) Mihnea Boroș
2	(Romania) Laurențiu Corbu	23	(Romania) Andrei Răuță
96	(Romania) Ionuț Nadolu	99	(Romania) Ștefan Ustinescu
4	(Romania) Alexandru Mateescu	15	(Romania) Patrik Roșu
19	(Romania) Carlos Spătaru	21	(Romania) Mihai Manole
11	(Romania) Eduard Cotea	5	(Romania) Andrei Paliu
18	(Romania) David Ciocan	3	(Romania) Eduard Feraru
6	(Romania) Alexandru Marin	14	(Romania) Davide Bledea
10	(Romania) Ionuț Catrina	8	(Romania) Robert Barbu
17	(Romania) Radu Vălușescu	16	(Romania) Alexandru Ionică
20	(Romania) Marius Discălicău	7	(Romania) Alexandru Potecea
9	(Romania) Bogdan Tănase	77	(Romania) Andrei Zătreanu

== Club officials ==
=== Technical staff ===
Role	Name
Head coach	(Romania) Valentin Bădoi
Assistant coach	(Romania) Vasile Constantin
Goalkeeping coach	(Romania) Florin Andreescu

== League and Cup history ==
Season	Tier	Division	Place	Notes	Cupa României
LPS HD Clinceni / Inter Ilfov
2026–27	3	Liga III (Series V)	Ongoing		First round
2025–26	3	Liga III (Series V)	8th	Promotion play-off	Third round
2024–25	3	Liga III (Series IV)	6th		
2023–24	3	Liga III (Series III)	4th	Promotion play-off	
2022–23	4	Liga IV (IF)	1st (C)	Lost promotion play-off; admitted to Liga III	
CS Buftea / Academica Clinceni
2021–22	1	Liga I	15th (R)	Relegated; senior activity ceased	Round of 32
2020–21	1	Liga I	5th	Championship play-off	Round of 32
2019–20	1	Liga I	10th		Quarter-finals
2018–19	2	Liga II	2nd (P)	Promoted	Round of 32
2017–18	2	Liga II	6th		Round of 32
2016–17	2	Liga II	14th		Round of 32
2015–16	2	Liga II (Series I)	6th		Round of 32
2014–15	2	Liga II (Series I)	2nd		Fifth round
2013–14	2	Liga II (Series I)	4th		Fifth round
2012–13	2	Liga II (Series I)	6th		
2011–12	3	Liga III (Series III)	1st (C, P)	Promoted	
2010–11	3	Liga III (Series II)	8th		
2009–10	3	Liga III (Series III)	5th		
2008–09	2	Liga II (Series I)	13th	Transferred Liga II place	
2007–08	3	Liga III (Series III)	2nd (P)	Promoted via play-off	
2006–07	3	Liga III (Series III)	3rd		
2005–06	3	Divizia C (Series III)	6th		

== Notable former players ==
The following players represented the former CS Buftea / Academica Clinceni entity and either played international football or had a significant spell at the club.

- (Romania) Andrei Antohi
- (Romania) Mircea Axente
- (Romania) Mihai Butean
- (Romania) Costin Gheorghe
- (Armenia) Arman Karamyan
- (Armenia) Artavazd Karamyan
- (Romania) Giani Kiriță
- (Romania) Cezar Lungu
- (Moldova) Artur Pătraș
- (Romania) Bogdan Pătrașcu
- (Romania) Adrian Popa
- (Romania) Cornel Predescu
- (Moldova) Ion Prodan
- (Romania) Cristian Pulhac
- (Romania) Cristian Scutaru
- (Romania) Stelian Stancu
- (Romania) Florin Ștefan
- (Romania) Andrei Vițelaru

== Managers ==
=== First entity ===
- (Romania) Marin Radu (2007–2008)
- (Romania) Lavi Hrib (2009–2011)
- (Romania) Ionel Augustin (2011)
- (Romania) Lavi Hrib (2011–2012)
- (Romania) Giani Kiriță (2012)
- (Romania) Costel Pană (2012)
- (Romania) Emil Ursu (2012)
- (Romania) Valentin Bădoi (2012–2014)
- (Romania) Marcel Abăluță (2014, caretaker)
- (Romania) Marius Baciu (2014–2015)
- (Romania) László Balint (2015–2016)
- (Romania) Mugur Bolohan (2016)
- (Romania) John Ene (2016–2017)
- (Romania) Erik Lincar (2017)
- (Romania) Ilie Poenaru (2018–2021)
- (Romania) Ionuț Chirilă (2021)
- (Romania) John Ene (2021, caretaker)
- (Romania) Adrian Falub (2021–2022)
- (Romania) John Ene (2022, caretaker)

=== Current entity ===
- (Romania) Constantin Giurescu (2022)
- (Romania) Florin Stângă (2022)
- (Romania) Mirel Bolboașă (2023–2024)
- (Romania) Paul Pîrvulescu (2024–2026)
- (Romania) Valentin Bădoi (2026–present)
