= Alexandru Kiss =

Romanian footballer (born 1959)

Personal information
- Full name: Alexandru Petru Kiss
- Date of birth: 11 June 1959 (age 67)
- Place of birth: Săcueni, Romania
- Height: 1.88 m (6 ft 2 in)
- Position: Defender

Senior career*
Years	Team	Apps	(Gls)
1976–1987	Bihor Oradea	195	(16)
1987–1994	Stăruința Săcueni		
Total		195	(16)

Managerial career
- 1995–2000: Viitorul Oradea (youth center)
- 2000–2001: Bihor Oradea (assistant)
- 2001–2002: Minerul Șuncuiuș
- 2002–2003: Unirea Valea lui Mihai
- 2003–2005: Bihor Oradea (youth center)
- 2005–2006: Bihor Oradea (assistant)
- 2006: Bihor Oradea
- 2008–2009: Cetatea Biharia
- 2010: Viitorul Popești
- 2010: Luceafărul Oradea
- 2011–2014: Kinder Paleu (assistant)
- 2014–2017: Luceafărul Oradea (assistant)
- 2017: Luceafărul Oradea
- 2017: Luceafărul Oradea (assistant)
- 2018–2024: Vulturii Săcueni
- * Club domestic league appearances and goals as of 21:08, 11 January 2025 (UTC)

Alexandru Petru Kiss (born 11 April 1959) is a Romanian of Hungarian ethnicity former professional footballer and currently a football manager. Kiss played almost its entire career for FC Bihor Oradea, club for which appeared in 195 matches and scored 16 goals (106 matches and 5 goals in Divizia A).

After retirement he started his football coach career in the youth center of Viitorul Oradea, then was the manager of various fourth tier teams such as Vulturii Săcueni, Minerul Șuncuiuș, Unirea Valea lui Mihai or Cetatea Biharia, among others. At the level of Liga II he was the manager of FC Bihor Oradea and Luceafărul Oradea, but for short periods of time, in generally serving as assistant coach for Zsolt Muzsnay, Marin Ion or Cornel Țălnar, among others.

== Honours ==
Bihor Oradea

- Divizia B: 1981–82
