= Turris Turnu Măgurele =

Turris Turnu Măgurele may refer to:

- CS Dunărea Turris Turnu Măgurele, a dissolved football club in Turnu Măgurele, Romania
- AFC Turris-Oltul Turnu Măgurele, a football club in Turnu Măgurele, Romania
