= Cosmin =

Cosmin is a masculine Romanian given name of Greek origin. Notable people with the name include:

- Cosmin Băcilă (born 1983), Romanian footballer
- Cosmin Bărcăuan (born 1978), Romanian footballer
- Cosmin Bodea (born 1973), Romanian footballer and manager
- Cosmin Chetroiu (born 1987), Romanian luger
- Cosmin Ciocoteală (born 1997), Romanian footballer
- Cosmin Contra (born 1975), Romanian footballer and manager
- Cosmin Frăsinescu (born 1985), Romanian footballer
- Cosmin Gârleanu (born 1989), Romanian footballer
- Cosmin Gherman (born 1984), Romanian futsal player
- Cosmin Hănceanu (born 1986), Romanian fencer
- Cosmin Mărginean (born 1978), Romanian footballer
- Cosmin Matei (born 1991), Romanian footballer
- Cosmin Moți (born 1984), Romanian footballer
- Cosmin Muj (born 1988), Romanian aerobic gymnast
- Cosmin Năstăsie (born 1983), Romanian footballer
- Cosmin Olăroiu (born 1969), Romanian footballer and manager
- Cosmin Paşca, Romanian sprint canoeist
- Cosmin Pașcovici (born 1978), Romanian footballer
- Cosmin Iulian Plesescu (born 2004), Romanian rower
- Cosmin Alin Popescu (born 1974), Romanian rector of the Banat University of Agricultural Sciences and Veterinary Medicine (USABTM)
- Cosmin Radu (born 1981), Romanian water polo player
- Cosmin Rațiu (born 1979), Romanian rugby union player
- Cosmin Tilincă (born 1980), Romanian footballer
- Cosmin Vancea (born 1984), Romanian footballer
- Cosmin Vâtcă (born 1982), Romanian footballer

== See also ==
- Cozmin Gușă (born 1970), Romanian politician
