= CSL Nanov =

- Full name: Clubul Sportiv Local Nanov
- Short name: Nanov
- Founded: 2022
- Ground: Comunal
- Capacity: 1,000
- Owner: Nanov Local Council
- Chairman: Cezar Ghibirdic
- Head coach: Leonard Strizu
- League: Liga IV
- 2025–26: Liga III, Seria V, 11th (relegated)

Clubul Sportiv Local Nanov, commonly known as CSL Nanov or simply as Nanov, is a Romanian football club based in Nanov, Teleorman County, that competes in Liga III, the third tier of the Romanian football league system.

== History ==
CSL Nanov was founded in 2022, taking the place of newly promoted Viitorul Piatra in Liga IV – Teleorman County, the fourth tier of Romanian football and the top level at the county stage, and finished the 2022–23 season in 5th place.

In the 2023–24 season, with Ovidiu Herea as head coach and several experienced players such as Alin Buleică and Sorin Bușu, CSL Nanov won the Teleorman County championship and qualified for the promotion play-off to Liga IIII, where they lost to Liga IV – Argeș County winner Speed Academy Pitești after defeats of 0–5 away and 1–2 at home.

In the 2024–25 season, Nanov once again won Liga IV – Teleorman County and again lost the promotion play-off, this time against FC Păușești-Otăsău, the Vâlcea County champion, after a 2–1 home win and a 0–3 away defeat. The squad, led by Herea, included players such as Dragoș Balauru, Claudiu Herea, Sorin Bușu, Alin Buleică, Valentin Ghenovici, Alexandru Chiriceanu and Cosmin Ciocoteală.

However, Nanov was later admitted to Liga III following the withdrawal of other teams, and Marian Botea was appointed as the new head coach for the 2025–26 campaign. However, following poor results, he was sacked after twelve rounds, and Leonard Strizu took over the position.

== Honours ==
Liga IV – Teleorman County

- Winners (2): 2023–24, 2024–25

Cupa României – Teleorman County

- Winners (2): 2023–23, 2024–25

== League and cup history ==
Season	Tier	Division	Place	Notes	Cupa României
2025–26	3	Liga III (Seria V)	TBD		
2024–25	4	Liga IV (TR)	1st (C)	Promoted	
2023–24	4	Liga IV (TR)	1st (C)		
2022–23	4	Liga IV (TR)	5th		

== Former managers ==
- (Romania) Ovidiu Herea (2023–2025)
- (Romania) Marian Botea (2025)
- (Romania) Leonard Strizu (2025–)
