= Valentin Bădoi =

Romanian footballer

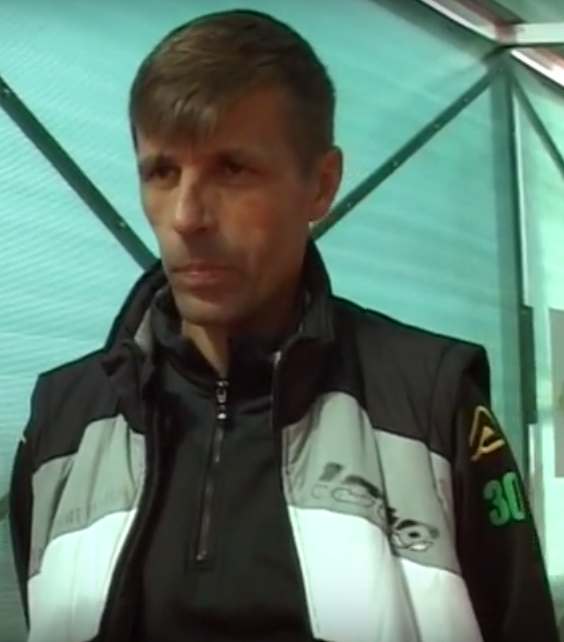

Personal information
- Full name: Valentin Emanoil Bădoi
- Date of birth: 16 December 1975 (age 50)
- Place of birth: Turnu Măgurele, Romania
- Height: 1.82 m (6 ft 0 in)
- Position: Right back

Youth career
- Chimia Turnu Măgurele

Senior career*
Years	Team	Apps	(Gls)
1996–2000	Chimia Turnu Măgurele		
1997–1998	→ Rulmentul Alexandria (loan)		
2000–2002	FCM Bacău	59	(13)
2002–2007	Rapid București	151	(23)
2007	Steaua București	10	(0)
2008–2009	Politehnica Timişoara	45	(3)
2009–2010	Universitatea Craiova	15	(0)
2010	FC Brașov	11	(0)
2011–2012	Viitorul Domnești		
2012	Conpet Ploiești		
2014–2016	Sporting Turnu Măgurele		
2016–2017	Voința Crevedia		
Total		291	(39)

International career
2005–2007	Romania	10	(0)

Managerial career
- 2012–2014: Clinceni
- 2014–2016: Sporting Turnu Măgurele (player/coach)
- 2016: Academica Clinceni (assistant)
- 2016–2017: Voința Crevedia (player/coach)
- 2018–2019: Carmen București
- 2020: Comuna Recea (assistant)
- 2021–2023: Petrolul Ploiești (assistant)
- 2023–2024: Cetatea Turnu Măgurele
- 2024–2025: Gloria Buzău (assistant)
- 2025: Petrolul II Ploiești (assistant)
- 2025: Petrolul II Ploiești
- * Club domestic league appearances and goals

Valentin Emanoil Bădoi (born 16 December 1975) is a Romanian professional football manager and former player.

== International career ==
Valentin Bădoi played 10 games for Romania, making his debut under coach Victor Pițurcă on 9 February 2005, when he came as a substitute and replaced Mirel Rădoi in the 81st minute of a friendly match, which ended 2–2 against Slovakia. His following two games were a 2–0 home victory against Czech Republic and a 1–0 away victory against Finland at the 2006 World Cup qualifiers. Bădoi's last appearance for the national team was on 16 August 2006 in a friendly against Cyprus which ended with a 2–0 victory.

== Career statistics ==
=== International ===
National team	Year	Apps	Goals
Romania
Romania	2005	5	0
Romania	2006	5	0
Total		10	0

== Honours ==
=== Player ===
Rulmentul Alexandria

- Divizia C: 1997–98

Rapid București

- Divizia A: 2002–03
- Cupa României: 2005–06, 2006–07
- Supercupa României: 2002, 2003

Politehnica Timișoara

- Cupa României runner-up: 2009

Sporting Turnu Măgurele

- Liga IV – Teleorman County: 2014–15

=== Coach ===
Clinceni

- Liga III: 2011–12

Sporting Turnu Măgurele

- Liga IV – Teleorman County: 2014–15

Carmen București

- Liga IV – Bucharest: 2018–19
