= 2008–09 Liga IV =

67th season of the Liga IV, the fourth tier of the Romanian football league

Liga IV
- Season: 2008–09

The 2008–09 Liga IV was the 67th season of the Liga IV, the fourth tier of the Romanian football league system. The champions of each county association play against one from a neighboring county in a play-off match played on a neutral venue. The winners of the play-off matches promoted to Liga III.

== County leagues ==
- Alba (AB)
- Arad (AR)
- Argeș (AG)
- Bacău (BC)
- Bihor (BH)
- Bistrița-Năsăud (BN)
- Botoșani (BT)
- Brașov (BV)
- Brăila (BR)
- Bucharest (B)
- Buzău (BZ)
- Caraș-Severin (CS)
- Călărași (CL)
- Cluj (CJ)
- Constanța (CT)
- Covasna (CV)
- Dâmbovița (DB)
- Dolj (DJ)
- Galați (GL)
- Giurgiu (GR)
- Gorj (GJ)
- Harghita (HR)
- Hunedoara (HD)
- Ialomița (IL)
- Iași (IS)
- Ilfov (IF)
- Maramureș (MM)
- Mehedinți (MH)
- Mureș (MS)
- Neamț (NT)
- Olt (OT)
- Prahova (PH)
- Satu Mare (SM)
- Sălaj (SJ)
- Sibiu (SB)
- Suceava (SV)
- Teleorman (TR)
- Timiș (TM)
- Tulcea (TL)
- Vaslui (VS)
- Vâlcea (VL)
- Vrancea (VN)

== Promotion play-off ==
The matches were played on 17 June 2009.

Team 1	Score	Team 2
Gura Humorului (SV)	2–0	(BT) Roma
Rapid Dumești (IS)	0–1	(VS) Vaslui II
Voința Pângărați (NT)	1–3	(MS) Miercurea Nirajului
Mesagerul Bacău (BC)	0–0 (3–5 p)	(VN) Dumitrești
Partizanul Merei (BZ)	0–0 (5–4 p)	(GL) Dunărea Galați II
Viitorul Ianca (BR)	3–0 (Note: The FRF Discipline Commission decided that the result of the match Viitorul Ianca - Stăruința Baia 1–2 would be approved with 3–0. The team from Baia used four players without the right to play.)	(TL) Stăruința Baia
Abatorul Slobozia (IL)	2–3	(CT) Oil Terminal Constanța
Viscofil Popești Leordeni (IF)	4–2	(CL) Phoenix Ulmu
Comprest GIM București (B)	2–1	(TR) Alexandria
Progresul Gorgota (DB)	2–1	(GR) Viitorul Toporu
Albota (AG)	3–2	(DJ) Avântul Bârca
Agromec Șimian (MH)	0–2	(GJ) Ralbex Turcinești
Ghecon Lăpușata (VL)	2–1	(OT) Sportul Vișina Noua
Inter Cristian (BV)	1–4	(HR) Petrolul Teleajen Ploiești
Voința Livezile (BN)	2–1	(MM) Someșul Ulmeni
Turul Micula (SM)	2–1	(SJ) Silvania Șimleu Silvaniei II
Luceafărul Oradea (BH)	2–1	(CJ) Arieșul Turda II
Berzobis Berzovia (CS)	0–0 (8–9 p)	(AB) Minaur Zlatna
Recaș (TM)	7–0	(AR) Partizan Satu Mare
Roseal Odorheiu Secuiesc (HR)	5–2 (a.e.t.)	(CV) Zagon
Voința Sibiu (SB)	2–0	(HD) Retezatul Hațeg

== Leagues standings ==
=== Alba County ===
Pos	Team	Pld	W	D	L	GF	GA	GD	Pts	Qualification or relegation
1	Minaur Zlatna (C, Q)	28	23	3	2	75	9	+66	72	Qualification to promotion play-off
2	Ocna Mureș	28	17	4	7	76	38	+38	55	
3	Mureșul Oarda de Jos	28	17	2	9	64	39	+25	53	
4	Viitorul Sântimbru	28	13	6	9	45	53	−8	45	
5	Performanța Ighiu	28	13	3	12	51	48	+3	42	
6	Balomir Acmariu	28	12	5	11	59	44	+15	41	
7	Cugir	28	12	4	12	65	43	+22	40	
8	Olimpia Aiud	28	12	4	12	46	58	−12	40	
9	Metalul Aiud	28	11	6	11	38	41	−3	39	
10	Rapid CFR Teiuș	28	11	4	13	50	56	−6	37	
11	Viitorul Unirea	28	9	8	11	39	45	−6	35	
12	Industria Galda	28	9	6	13	33	41	−8	33	
13	Cuprirom Abrud	28	10	2	16	40	67	−27	32	
14	CIL Blaj (Note: CIL Blaj was spared from relegation due to the promotion of Minaur Zlatna to Liga III.)	28	9	2	17	34	57	−23	29	Spared from relegation
15	Șoimii Ciumbrud (R)	28	2	1	25	24	100	−76	7	Relegation to Liga V Alba
16	Real Alba Iulia (Note: Real Alba Iulia withdrew after 10 rounds and all its results were canceled.) (D)	0	0	0	0	0	0	0	0	Withdrew

Rules for classification: 1) Points; 2) Head-to-head points; 3) Head-to-head goal difference; 4) Head-to-head goals scored; 5) Head-to-head away goals scored; 6) Goal difference; 7) Goals scored.
(C) Champions; (D) Disqualified; (Q) Qualified for the phase indicated; (R) Relegated

=== Arad County ===
Pos	Team	Pld	W	D	L	GF	GA	GD	Pts	Qualification or relegation
1	Partizan Satu Mare (C, Q)	34	28	1	5	126	40	+86	85	Qualification for promotion play-off
2	Frontiera Curtici	34	25	4	5	88	37	+51	79	
3	Șoimii CNM Pâncota	34	22	3	9	82	52	+30	69	
4	Unirea Sântana	34	21	3	10	78	51	+27	66	
5	Voința Mailat	34	20	2	12	61	38	+23	62	
6	Șoimii Lipova	34	15	8	11	71	48	+23	53	
7	Crișul Chișineu-Criș	34	16	3	15	62	59	+3	51	
8	Progresul Pecica	34	14	8	12	64	60	+4	50	
9	Avântul Târnova	34	14	7	13	59	51	+8	49	
10	Dorobanți	34	14	6	14	49	54	−5	48	
11	Aqua Vest Arad	34	13	3	18	59	72	−13	42	
12	Păulișana Păuliș	34	13	2	19	73	94	−21	41	
13	Vladimirescu	34	12	3	19	62	84	−22	39	
14	Unirea Șeitin	34	11	2	21	62	90	−28	35	
15	Sânleani	34	11	1	22	51	62	−11	34	
16	Victoria Nădlac (R)	34	8	6	20	43	76	−33	30	Relegation to Liga V Arad
17	Înfrățirea Iratoșu (R)	34	9	2	23	47	88	−41	29	Relegation to Liga V Arad
18	Regal Horia (R)	34	7	2	25	35	116	−81	23	Relegation to Liga V Arad

Rules for classification: 1) Points; 2) Head-to-head points; 3) Head-to-head goal difference; 4) Head-to-head goals scored; 5) Head-to-head away goals scored; 6) Goal difference; 7) Goals scored.
(C) Champions; (Q) Qualified for the phase indicated; (R) Relegated

=== Bacău County ===
Pos	Team	Pld	W	D	L	GF	GA	GD	Pts	Qualification or relegation
1	Mesagerul Bacău (C, Q)	34	25	2	7	106	24	+82	77	Qualification to promotion play-off
2	Aerostar Bacău II	34	21	4	9	89	42	+47	67	
3	Mărgineni	34	21	1	12	98	45	+53	64	
4	Siretul Prăjești	34	20	1	13	80	55	+25	61	
5	Onești	34	17	3	14	86	78	+8	54	
6	Athletic Dărmănești	34	17	2	15	90	61	+29	53	
7	Înfrățirea Ghimeș	34	16	4	14	82	67	+15	52	
8	Clipa VIO Bacău	34	16	4	14	57	69	−12	52	
9	Willy Bacău II	34	15	3	16	92	83	+9	48	
10	Sportul Răcăciuni	34	14	6	14	67	63	+4	48	
11	Inter Onești	34	15	1	18	82	90	−8	46	
12	Negri	34	13	5	16	71	72	−1	44	
13	Buhuși	34	14	2	18	58	72	−14	44	
14	Măgura Târgu Ocna	34	12	3	19	49	68	−19	39	
15	Voința Podul Turcului (O)	34	12	3	19	51	89	−38	39	Qualification to relegation play-out
16	Hemeiuși (R)	34	9	2	23	58	91	−33	29	Qualification to relegation play-out
17	Flamura Roșie Sascut (R)	34	9	2	23	37	75	−38	29	Relegation to Liga V Bacău
18	Recolta Ardeoani (Note: Recolta Ardeoani was excluded from the championship and lost all remaining matches with 0–3.) (R)	34	5	1	28	41	150	−109	16	Relegation to Liga V Bacău

Rules for classification: 1) Points; 2) Head-to-head points; 3) Head-to-head goal difference; 4) Head-to-head goals scored; 5) Head-to-head away goals scored; 6) Goal difference; 7) Goals scored.
(C) Champions; (O) Play-off winners; (Q) Qualified for the phase indicated; (R) Relegated
Notes:

Relegation play-out

The teams on the 12th and 13th places in Liga IV Bacău face the teams on the 2nd place in the two series of the Liga V Bacău. All matches were played on 7 and 8 July 2009 at Letea Stadium in Bacău.

Team 1	Score	Team 2
Hemeiuși	0–3	Bradul Mânăstirea Cașin
Voința Podul Turcului	1–0	Itești

=== Bihor County ===
Pos	Team	Pld	W	D	L	GF	GA	GD	Pts	Qualification or relegation
1	Luceafărul Oradea (C, Q)	30	27	2	1	123	17	+106	83	Qualification for promotion play-off
2	Unirea Valea lui Mihai	30	25	1	4	107	17	+90	76	
3	Izvorul Cociuba Mare	30	23	2	5	111	47	+64	71	
4	Bioland Paleu	30	22	2	6	95	24	+71	68	
5	Crișul Aleșd	30	17	3	10	80	52	+28	54	
6	Stăruința Săcuieni	30	12	7	11	52	51	+1	43	
7	Oțelul Ștei	30	12	6	12	50	55	−5	42	
8	Frontiera Oradea	30	11	5	14	49	65	−16	38	
9	Victoria Avram Iancu	30	12	2	16	50	77	−27	38	
10	Tricolorul Alparea	30	11	4	15	50	63	−13	37	
11	Cetatea Biharia	30	11	1	18	54	68	−14	34	
12	Locadin Țețchea	30	9	5	16	47	72	−25	32	
13	Biharea Vașcău	30	9	2	19	33	86	−53	29	
14	Nova Cordău (R)	30	6	2	22	39	108	−69	20	Relegation to Liga V Bihor
15	Granitul Nucet (R)	30	6	2	22	40	101	−61	14 (Note: Granitul Nucet deducted 6 points.)	Relegation to Liga V Bihor
16	Vulturul Dobrești (R)	30	3	2	25	26	103	−77	11	Relegation to Liga V Bihor

Rules for classification: 1) Points; 2) Head-to-head points; 3) Head-to-head goal difference; 4) Head-to-head goals scored; 5) Head-to-head away goals scored; 6) Goal difference; 7) Goals scored.
(C) Champions; (Q) Qualified for the phase indicated; (R) Relegated

=== Botoșani County ===
Pos	Team	Pld	W	D	L	GF	GA	GD	Pts	Qualification or relegation
1	Roma (C, Q)	26	24	1	1	120	18	+102	73	Qualification to promotion play-off
2	Vorona	26	19	3	4	105	50	+55	60	
3	Avântul Albești	26	16	3	7	64	36	+28	51	
4	Darabani	26	15	4	7	68	36	+32	49	
5	Bucecea	26	12	3	11	54	43	+11	39	
6	Prosport Vârfu Câmpului	26	12	2	12	60	61	−1	38	
7	Bucovina Rogojești	26	12	2	12	58	75	−17	38	
8	Unirea Săveni	26	12	1	13	63	63	0	37	
9	Dorohoi	26	11	3	12	55	57	−2	36	
10	Rapid Ungureni	26	11	2	13	61	67	−6	35	
11	Nord Star Pomârla (O)	26	10	3	13	62	52	+10	33	Qualification to relegation play-off
12	Sulița (R)	26	6	4	16	41	75	−34	22	Qualification to relegation play-off
13	Prutul Rădăuți-Prut (R)	26	3	1	22	40	147	−107	10	Relegation to Liga V Botoșani
14	Itrom Trakt Tudor Vladimirescu (Note: Itrom Trakt Tudor Vladimirescu withdrew from championship and lost all the matches from the second part of the season with 0–3.) (R)	26	3	0	23	21	92	−71	9	Relegation to Liga V Botoșani

Rules for classification: 1) Points; 2) Head-to-head points; 3) Head-to-head goal difference; 4) Head-to-head goals scored; 5) Head-to-head away goals scored; 6) Goal difference; 7) Goals scored.
(C) Champions; (O) Play-off winners; (Q) Qualified for the phase indicated; (R) Relegated
Notes:

Relegation play-off

The 11th and 12th-placed teams of the Liga IV faces the 2nd placed teams from the two series of Liga V Botoșani.

Team 1	Score	Team 2
Nord Star Pomârla	4–2	Spicul Iacobeni
Sulița	–	Păltiniș

=== Bucharest ===
Series I

Pos	Team	Pld	W	D	L	GF	GA	GD	Pts	Qualification or relegation
1	Comprest GIM București (Q)	26	20	3	3	78	18	+60	63	Qualification to championship play-off
2	Spic de Grâu București (Q)	26	20	3	3	98	22	+76	63	Qualification to championship play-off
3	Sportul Studențesc București II (Q)	26	19	2	5	74	19	+55	59	Qualification to championship play-off
4	Dinamo București III	26	17	3	6	68	40	+28	54	
5	Chitila	26	17	1	8	64	24	+40	52	
6	Concordia Chiajna II	26	13	2	11	43	24	+19	41	
7	Inter Voluntari	26	11	6	9	25	22	+3	39	
8	Termo București	26	12	2	12	40	35	+5	38	
9	Tracțiunea Cristexim Chitila	29	11	4	14	28	42	−14	37	
10	Progresul București II	26	6	7	13	22	52	−30	25	
11	Aversa București	26	6	3	17	22	49	−27	21	
12	Progresul Cernica	26	3	2	21	14	82	−68	11	
13	Rocar ANEFS București	26	2	3	21	20	82	−62	9	
14	Pantelimon	26	2	2	22	18	112	−94	8	

Rules for classification: 1) Points; 2) Head-to-head points; 3) Head-to-head goal difference; 4) Head-to-head goals scored; 5) Head-to-head away goals scored; 6) Goal difference; 7) Goals scored.
(Q) Qualified for the phase indicated

Series II

Pos	Team	Pld	W	D	L	GF	GA	GD	Pts	Qualification or relegation
1	Mogoșoaia (Q)	34	28	0	6	123	24	+99	84	Qualification to championship play-off
2	Romprim București (Q)	34	25	6	3	137	53	+84	81	Qualification to championship play-off
3	Poli Timișoara (Q)	34	25	2	7	115	27	+88	77	Qualification to championship play-off
4	Metaloglobus București	34	24	3	7	110	28	+82	75	
5	Frăția București	34	21	3	10	104	41	+63	66	
6	Coresi București	34	21	1	12	102	59	+43	64	
7	Forex București	34	18	3	13	64	57	+7	57	
8	Atleticos București	34	16	4	14	72	65	+7	52	
9	Petrolul București	34	17	1	16	65	72	−7	52	
10	Sportul Studențesc București	34	16	3	15	60	60	0	51	
11	Cautis București	34	15	2	17	65	86	−21	47	
12	Voluntari	34	14	4	16	52	56	−4	46	
13	Voința Temerari București	34	13	3	18	65	99	−34	42	
14	Marius Lăcătuș București	34	9	2	23	60	114	−54	29	
15	LSM București	34	7	2	25	56	89	−33	23	
16	Concordia Roșu 2008	34	5	5	24	41	122	−81	20	
17	Măgurele	34	5	2	27	37	108	−71	17	
18	Zamsport București	34	0	2	32	18	183	−165	2	

Rules for classification: 1) Points; 2) Head-to-head points; 3) Head-to-head goal difference; 4) Head-to-head goals scored; 5) Head-to-head away goals scored; 6) Goal difference; 7) Goals scored.
(Q) Qualified for the phase indicated

Championship play-off

All matches were played at Romprim Stadium in București on 2, 5 and 9 June 2009.

Group 1

Pos	Team	Pld	W	D	L	GF	GA	GD	Pts	Qualification	ROM	SGB	SPO
1	Romprim București (Q)	2	2	0	0	5	2	+3	6	Qualification to final			3–2
2	Spic de Grâu București	2	1	0	1	3	3	0	3		0–2		
3	Sportul Studențesc București II	2	0	0	2	3	6	−3	0			1–3	

Legend: Blue = home team win; Yellow = draw; Red = away team win.
Rules for classification: 1) Points; 2) Head-to-head points; 3) Head-to-head goal difference; 4) Head-to-head goals scored; 5) Head-to-head away goals scored; 6) Goal difference; 7) Goals scored.
(Q) Qualified for the phase indicated

Group 2

Pos	Team	Pld	W	D	L	GF	GA	GD	Pts	Qualification	COM	MOG	PTI
1	Comprest GIM București (Q)	2	1	1	0	7	3	+4	4 (Note: Mogoșoaia–Comprest GIM București 2–2 (2–3 p).)	Qualification to final			5–1
2	Mogoșoaia	2	1	1	0	8	3	+5	4		2–2		
3	Poli Timișoara	2	0	0	2	2	11	−9	0			1–6	

Legend: Blue = home team win; Yellow = draw; Red = away team win.
Rules for classification: 1) Points; 2) Head-to-head points; 3) Head-to-head goal difference; 4) Head-to-head goals scored; 5) Head-to-head away goals scored; 6) Goal difference; 7) Goals scored.
(Q) Qualified for the phase indicated
Notes:

Final

The championship final was played on 11 June 2009 at Dinamo Stadium in București.

Team 1	Score	Team 2
Comprest GIM București	3–2	Romprim București

Comprest GIM București won the Liga IV Bucharest and qualify to promotion play-off in Liga III.

=== Caraș-Severin County ===
Pos	Team	Pld	W	D	L	GF	GA	GD	Pts	Qualification or relegation
1	Berzobis Berzovia (C, Q)	30	24	4	2	91	22	+69	76	Qualification to promotion play-off
2	Muncitorul Reșița	30	20	6	4	78	38	+40	66	
3	Voința Lupac	30	18	6	6	81	31	+50	60	
4	Moldo-Forest Moldova Nouă	30	19	2	9	80	34	+46	59	
5	Gloria Reșița	30	19	1	10	72	32	+40	58	
6	Minerul Anina	30	17	4	9	62	35	+27	55	
7	Scorilo Caransebeș	30	16	3	11	82	39	+43	51	
8	Berzasca	30	15	5	10	81	50	+31	50	
9	Metalul Bocșa	30	13	3	14	69	51	+18	42	
10	Nera Bozovici	30	11	4	15	46	60	−14	37	
11	AHercules Băile Herculane	30	9	3	18	40	75	−35	30	
12	Metalul Oțelu Roșu	30	8	4	18	58	75	−17	28	
13	Oravița	30	7	3	20	38	117	−79	24	
14	Bistra Glimboca	30	8	0	22	36	87	−51	24	
15	AMinerul Dognecea (R)	30	6	1	23	36	115	−79	19	Relegation to Liga V Caraș-Severin
16	Timișul Slatina-Timiș (R)	30	4	3	23	37	126	−89	15	Relegation to Liga V Caraș-Severin

Rules for classification: 1) Points; 2) Head-to-head points; 3) Head-to-head goal difference; 4) Head-to-head goals scored; 5) Head-to-head away goals scored; 6) Goal difference; 7) Goals scored.
(C) Champions; (Q) Qualified for the phase indicated; (R) Relegated

=== Călărași County ===
East Series

Pos	Team	Pld	W	D	L	GF	GA	GD	Pts	Qualification or relegation
1	Phoenix Ulmu	26	22	2	2	102	13	+89	68	Qualification to championship play-off
2	Venus Independența	26	20	2	4	79	25	+54	62	Qualification to championship play-off
3	Victoria Lehliu	26	17	2	7	75	30	+45	53	Qualification to championship play-off
4	Spicul Roseți	26	16	5	5	69	23	+46	53	Qualification to championship play-off
5	Steaua Lehliu	26	14	6	6	60	31	+29	48	
6	Dunărea Ciocănești	26	13	5	8	56	57	−1	44	
7	Dunărea Grădiștea	26	12	5	9	58	41	+17	41	
8	Unirea Dragalina	26	10	3	13	45	57	−12	33	
9	Agricola Borcea	26	7	5	14	38	44	−6	26	
10	Rapid Gălățui	26	8	1	17	51	67	−16	25	
11	Avântul Dor Mărunt	26	7	3	16	44	72	−28	24	
12	Avântul Pietroiu	26	7	0	19	35	104	−69	21	
13	Conpet Ștefan cel Mare	26	6	2	18	31	90	−59	20	Relegation to Liga V Călărași
14	Speranța Plumbuit (Note: Speranța Plumbuita excluded during the season.)	26	2	1	23	24	113	−89	7	Relegation to Liga V Călărași

Rules for classification: 1) Points; 2) Head-to-head points; 3) Head-to-head goal difference; 4) Head-to-head goals scored; 5) Head-to-head away goals scored; 6) Goal difference; 7) Goals scored.
Notes:

West Series

Pos	Team	Pld	W	D	L	GF	GA	GD	Pts	Qualification or relegation
1	Curcani	26	18	6	2	58	17	+41	60	Qualification to championship play-off
2	Voința Nana	26	16	4	6	58	25	+33	52	Qualification to championship play-off
3	Gălbinași	26	16	3	7	70	37	+33	51	Qualification to championship play-off
4	Progresul Fundulea	26	16	2	8	77	38	+39	50	Qualification to championship play-off
5	Gloria Fundeni	26	14	1	11	72	46	+26	43	
6	Fortuna Tămădău	26	14	1	11	63	48	+15	43	
7	Steaua Radovanu	26	11	6	9	52	48	+4	39	
8	Rapid Ulmeni	26	12	3	11	67	64	+3	39	
9	Victoria Chirnogi	26	11	2	13	57	64	−7	35	
10	Budești	26	9	2	15	39	66	−27	29	
11	Dinamo Sărulești	26	8	3	15	48	57	−9	27	
12	Unirea Spanțov	26	8	2	16	48	84	−36	26	
13	Viitorul Șoldanu	26	7	1	18	37	84	−47	22	Relegation to Liga V Călărași
14	Gloria Valea Argovei (Note: Gloria Valea Argovei withdrew during the season.)	26	3	0	23	16	84	−68	9	Relegation to Liga V Călărași

Rules for classification: 1) Points; 2) Head-to-head points; 3) Head-to-head goal difference; 4) Head-to-head goals scored; 5) Head-to-head away goals scored; 6) Goal difference; 7) Goals scored.
Notes:

Championship play-off

Pos	Team	Pld	W	D	L	GF	GA	GD	Pts	Qualification
1	Phoenix Ulmu (C, Q)	10	8	1	1	18	4	+14	25	Qualification to promotion play-off
2	Victoria Lehliu	10	6	0	4	19	15	+4	18	
3	Venus Independența	10	5	1	4	14	12	+2	16	
4	Spicul Roseți	10	4	2	4	15	12	+3	14	
5	Gălbinași	10	4	1	5	11	16	−5	13	
6	Curcani	10	3	3	4	9	12	−3	12	
7	Progresul Fundulea	10	3	1	6	10	19	−9	10	
8	Voința Nana	10	2	1	7	8	15	−7	7	

Rules for classification: 1) Points; 2) Head-to-head points; 3) Head-to-head goal difference; 4) Head-to-head goals scored; 5) Head-to-head away goals scored; 6) Goal difference; 7) Goals scored.
(C) Champions; (Q) Qualified for the phase indicated

=== Cluj County ===
Pos	Team	Pld	W	D	L	GF	GA	GD	Pts	Qualification or relegation (Note: Teams are split into two groups (Play-off and Play-out) after each have played 20 matches.)
1	Arieșul Turda II (C, Q)	26	22	2	2	93	19	+74	68	Qualification to promotion play-off
2	Universitatea Cluj II	26	18	1	7	82	33	+49	55	
3	Vlădeasa Huedin	26	17	1	8	84	32	+52	52	
4	Vulturii Vultureni	26	16	2	8	71	43	+28	50	
5	Seso II Iara	26	16	2	8	78	60	+18	50	
6	Leii Tritenii de Jos	26	10	5	11	66	64	+2	35	
7	Știința 2004 Cluj-Napoca	26	9	2	15	72	73	−1	29	
8	CFR Dej	26	8	2	16	52	75	−23	26	
9	Minerul Ocna Dej	26	8	1	17	46	93	−47	25	
10	Unirea Tritenii de Jos	26	6	3	17	49	99	−50	21	
11	Ivansuc Cluj-Napoca (R)	26	2	1	23	37	139	−102	7	Relegation to Liga V Cluj

Rules for classification: 1) Points; 2) Head-to-head points; 3) Head-to-head goal difference; 4) Head-to-head goals scored; 5) Head-to-head away goals scored; 6) Goal difference; 7) Goals scored.
(C) Champions; (Q) Qualified for the phase indicated; (R) Relegated

=== Covasna County ===
Pos	Team	Pld	W	D	L	GF	GA	GD	Pts	Qualification or relegation
1	Zagon (C, Q)	30	25	5	0	124	17	+107	80	Qualification to promotion play-off
2	Baraolt	30	22	6	2	95	25	+70	72	
3	Stăruința Bodoc	30	19	3	8	116	34	+82	60	
4	Ojdula	30	17	7	6	72	39	+33	58	
5	Prima Brăduț	30	17	3	10	91	45	+46	54	
6	Perkő Sânzieni	30	13	9	8	65	42	+23	48	
7	Viitorul Sfântu Gheorghe	30	14	5	11	60	45	+15	47	
8	Nemere Ghelința	30	12	3	15	43	50	−7	39	
9	Progresul Sita Buzăului	30	10	3	17	56	96	−40	33	
10	Dozsa Dalnic	30	9	5	16	65	92	−27	32	
11	KSE Târgu Secuiesc	30	9	2	19	56	70	−14	29	
12	BSE Belin	30	8	4	18	39	75	−36	28	
13	Avântul Ilieni	30	9	1	20	42	128	−86	28	
14	Spartacus Hăghig	30	7	6	17	51	98	−47	27	
15	Cernat (R)	30	8	3	19	49	89	−40	27	Relegation to Liga V Covasna
16	Catalina (R)	30	8	1	21	41	120	−79	25	Relegation to Liga V Covasna

Rules for classification: 1) Points; 2) Head-to-head points; 3) Head-to-head goal difference; 4) Head-to-head goals scored; 5) Head-to-head away goals scored; 6) Goal difference; 7) Goals scored.
(C) Champions; (Q) Qualified for the phase indicated; (R) Relegated

=== Galați County ===
Pos	Team	Pld	W	D	L	GF	GA	GD	Pts	Qualification or relegation
1	Dunărea Galați II (Q)	18	15	1	2	54	21	+33	46	Qualification to championship play-off
2	Foresta Șendreni (Q)	18	13	1	4	49	25	+24	40	Qualification to championship play-off
3	Gloria Ivești (Q)	18	11	2	5	51	24	+27	35	Qualification to championship play-off
4	Sporting Tecuci (Q)	18	11	1	6	57	31	+26	34	Qualification to championship play-off
5	Muncitorul Ghidigeni	18	8	2	8	37	30	+7	26	
6	Bujorii Târgu Bujor	18	9	1	8	49	52	−3	26 (Note: Bujorii Târgu Bujor deducted 2 points.)	
7	Avântul Vânatori	18	7	2	9	30	45	−15	23	
8	Mălina Smârdan	18	4	5	9	29	53	−24	17	
9	Frontiera Galați	18	3	1	14	20	48	−28	10	
10	Unirea Hanu Conachi	18	1	0	17	6	53	−47	3	
11	Argintul Corod (Note: Argintul Corod, Avântul Liești, Imperfect Braniștea and Unirea Bolonia Tulucești withdrew in the first part of the season and all their results were canceled.) (D)	0	0	0	0	0	0	0	0	Withdrew
12	Avântul Liești (D)	0	0	0	0	0	0	0	0	Withdrew
13	Imperfect Braniștea (D)	0	0	0	0	0	0	0	0	Withdrew
14	Unirea Bolonia Tulucești (D)	0	0	0	0	0	0	0	0	Withdrew

Rules for classification: 1) Points; 2) Head-to-head points; 3) Head-to-head goal difference; 4) Head-to-head goals scored; 5) Head-to-head away goals scored; 6) Goal difference; 7) Goals scored.
(D) Disqualified; (Q) Qualified for the phase indicated
Notes:

Championship play-off

Pos	Team	Pld	W	D	L	GF	GA	GD	Pts	Qualification
1	Dunărea Galați II (C, Q)	6	3	1	2	70	34	+36	56	Qualification to promotion play-off
2	Foresta Șendreni	5	3	0	2	60	37	+23	49	
3	Gloria Ivești	6	3	1	2	71	36	+35	45	
4	Sporting Tecuci	5	0	2	3	64	48	+16	2	

Rules for classification: 1) Points; 2) Head-to-head points; 3) Head-to-head goal difference; 4) Head-to-head goals scored; 5) Head-to-head away goals scored; 6) Goal difference; 7) Goals scored.
(C) Champions; (Q) Qualified for the phase indicated

=== Harghita County ===
Pos	Team	Pld	W	D	L	GF	GA	GD	Pts	Qualification or relegation
1	Roseal Odorheiu Secuiesc (C, Q)	24	22	1	1	107	16	+91	67	Qualification to promotion play-off
2	Metalul Vlăhița	24	21	1	2	96	23	+73	64	
3	ASA Miercurea Ciuc Bălan	24	20	0	4	132	31	+101	60	
4	Ciceu	24	12	3	9	64	56	+8	39	
5	Csillag Lunca de Jos	24	11	3	10	51	68	−17	36	
6	Praid	24	11	2	11	56	51	+5	35	
7	Străduința Mihăileni	24	9	6	9	39	39	0	33	
8	Știința Sărmaș	24	9	2	13	57	97	−40	29	
9	CSȘ Start 2000 Miercurea Ciuc	24	8	2	14	75	66	+9	26	
10	Viitorul Gheorgheni	24	8	2	14	54	59	−5	26	
11	Unirea Cristuru Secuiesc	24	4	4	16	33	78	−45	16	
12	Știința Toplița	24	2	6	16	35	96	−61	12	
13	Homorod Merești	24	2	2	20	26	145	−119	8	

Rules for classification: 1) Points; 2) Head-to-head points; 3) Head-to-head goal difference; 4) Head-to-head goals scored; 5) Head-to-head away goals scored; 6) Goal difference; 7) Goals scored.
(C) Champions; (Q) Qualified for the phase indicated

=== Hunedoara County ===
Pos	Team	Pld	W	D	L	GF	GA	GD	Pts	Qualification or relegation
1	Retezatul Hațeg (C, Q)	28	23	0	5	87	33	+54	69	Qualification to promotion play-off
2	Aurul Brad	28	19	4	5	57	23	+34	61	
3	Minerul Uricani	28	17	6	5	54	27	+27	57	
4	Zarandul Crișcior	28	15	5	8	53	32	+21	50	
5	Inter Petrila	28	14	6	8	56	28	+28	48	
6	Aurul Certej	28	14	4	10	70	42	+28	46	
7	Dacia Orăștie II (Note: Dacia Orăștie II, Matei Corvin Hunedoara and Universitatea Petroșani withdrew in the second part of the season and lost all the remaining matches with 0–3.)	28	13	3	12	51	48	+3	42	
8	Minerul Aninoasa	28	13	3	12	47	44	+3	42	
9	Gloria Geoagiu	28	11	4	13	52	48	+4	37	
10	Metalul Crișcior	28	10	7	11	38	37	+1	37	
11	Victoria Călan	28	10	4	14	47	56	−9	34	
12	Agrocompany Băcia	28	8	3	17	47	90	−43	27	
13	Minerul Teliuc	28	6	3	19	27	64	−37	21	
14	Matei Corvin Hunedoara	28	7	0	21	21	75	−54	21	
15	Universitatea Petroșani	28	1	2	25	12	84	−72	5	

Rules for classification: 1) Points; 2) Head-to-head points; 3) Head-to-head goal difference; 4) Head-to-head goals scored; 5) Head-to-head away goals scored; 6) Goal difference; 7) Goals scored.
(C) Champions; (Q) Qualified for the phase indicated

=== Ilfov County ===
Championship play-off

The championship play-off was played in a single round-robin tournament between the best four teams of the regular season.

Pos	Team	Pld	W	D	L	GF	GA	GD	Pts	Qualification
1	Viscofil Popești-Leordeni (C, Q)	3	2	1	0	5	3	+2	7 (Note: Viscofil Popești-Leordeni–Lindab Ștefănești 2–2 (3–5 p).)	Qualification for promotion play-off
2	Corbeanca	3	1	1	1	3	3	0	4 (Note: Corbeanca–Domnești 0–0 (9–8 p).)	
3	Domnești	3	1	1	1	3	3	0	4	
4	Lindab Ștefănești	3	0	1	2	5	7	−2	1	

Rules for classification: 1) Points; 2) Head-to-head points; 3) Head-to-head goal difference; 4) Head-to-head goals scored; 5) Head-to-head away goals scored; 6) Goal difference; 7) Goals scored.
(C) Champions; (Q) Qualified for the phase indicated
Notes:

Results

Home \ Away	COR	DOM	LȘT	VPL
Corbeanca		0–0	2–1	
Domnești				0–1
Lindab Ștefănești		2–3		
Viscofil Popești-Leordeni	2–1		2–2	

Source: liga2.prosport.ro
Legend: Blue = home team win; Yellow = draw; Red = away team win.

=== Maramureș County ===
North Series

Pos	Team	Pld	W	D	L	GF	GA	GD	Pts	Qualification or relegation
1	Marmația Sighetu Marmației II (Note: Marmația Sighetu Marmației II as second team was not eligible for promotion because their first team played at the next level.)	22	19	2	1	137	30	+107	59	Ineligible for promotion
2	Borșa (Q)	22	17	4	1	87	28	+59	55	Qualification to championship final
3	Tisa Sighetu Marmației	22	12	5	5	64	34	+30	41	
4	Foresta Câmpulung la Tisa	22	12	4	6	45	37	+8	40	
5	Salina Ocna Șugatag	22	11	3	8	69	49	+20	36	
6	Zorile Moisei	22	8	5	9	46	45	+1	29	
7	Minerul Cavnic	22	9	1	12	28	50	−22	28	
8	Brișca Sarasău	22	6	2	14	33	92	−59	20	
9	Iza Dragomirești	22	5	3	14	48	70	−22	18	
10	Bradul Vișeu de Sus	22	5	3	14	47	78	−31	18	
11	Rozalina Rozavlea	22	6	0	16	45	112	−67	18	
12	Recolta Săliștea de Sus	22	4	4	14	31	57	−26	16	

Rules for classification: 1) Points; 2) Head-to-head points; 3) Head-to-head goal difference; 4) Head-to-head goals scored; 5) Head-to-head away goals scored; 6) Goal difference; 7) Goals scored.
(Q) Qualified for the phase indicated
Notes:

South Series

Pos	Team	Pld	W	D	L	GF	GA	GD	Pts	Qualification or relegation
1	Someșul Ulmeni (Q)	28	26	1	1	160	18	+142	79	Qualification to championship final
2	Spicul Ardusat	28	24	2	2	122	40	+82	74	
3	Spicul Mocira	28	20	3	5	107	51	+56	63	
4	Progresul Șomcuta Mare	28	14	8	6	67	42	+25	50	
5	Baia Mare II	28	13	5	10	73	57	+16	44	
6	Arsenal Baia Mare	28	13	4	11	48	47	+1	43	
7	Vectrix Satulung	28	12	6	10	60	65	−5	42	
8	Gloria Renel Baia Mare	28	11	2	15	77	99	−22	35	
9	Unirea Șișești	28	9	5	14	60	90	−30	32	
10	Lăpușul Târgu Lăpuș	28	8	4	16	55	84	−29	28	
11	Independența Baia Mare	28	7	4	17	40	79	−39	25	
12	Moeller Fărcașa	28	7	3	18	36	71	−35	24	
13	Minerul Băița	28	6	6	16	51	94	−43	24	
14	Dinamo Hideaga	28	6	2	20	30	84	−54	20	
15	Asten Tăuții-Măgherăuș	28	5	3	20	51	104	−53	18	

Rules for classification: 1) Points; 2) Head-to-head points; 3) Head-to-head goal difference; 4) Head-to-head goals scored; 5) Head-to-head away goals scored; 6) Goal difference; 7) Goals scored.
(Q) Qualified for the phase indicated

Championship final

The championship final was played on 4 June 2009 at Viorel Mateianu Stadium in Baia Mare.

Team 1	Score	Team 2
Someșul Ulmeni	6–1	Borșa

Someșul Ulmeni won the Liga IV Maramureș County and qualify to promotion play-off in Liga III.

=== Mureș County ===
Pos	Team	Pld	W	D	L	GF	GA	GD	Pts	Qualification
1	Miercurea Nirajului	18	14	2	2	51	15	+36	44	Qualification to play-off
2	Gaz Metan Daneș	18	12	2	4	52	24	+28	38	Qualification to play-off
3	Lacul Ursu Mobila Sovata	18	11	3	4	47	17	+30	36	Qualification to play-off
4	Mureșul Rușii-Munți	18	10	5	3	51	26	+25	35	Qualification to play-off
5	Mureșul Luduș	18	11	1	6	46	30	+16	34	Qualification to play-off
6	Avântul Miheșu de Câmpie	18	7	1	10	28	41	−13	22	Qualification to play-out
7	Iernut	18	5	4	9	25	41	−16	19	Qualification to play-out
8	Acățari	18	4	3	11	26	44	−18	15	Qualification to play-out
9	Corunca	18	1	4	13	18	56	−38	7	Qualification to play-out
10	Viitorul 2002 Târnăveni	18	1	3	14	19	69	−50	6	Qualification to play-out

Rules for classification: 1) Points; 2) Head-to-head points; 3) Head-to-head goal difference; 4) Head-to-head goals scored; 5) Head-to-head away goals scored; 6) Goal difference; 7) Goals scored.

Championship play-off

Pos	Team	Pld	W	D	L	GF	GA	GD	Pts	Qualification
1	Miercurea Nirajului (C, Q)	16	9	3	4	24	16	+8	30	Qualification to promotion play-off
2	Gaz Metan Daneș	16	7	2	7	31	29	+2	23	
3	Lacul Ursu Mobila Sovata	16	5	5	6	25	26	−1	20	
4	Mureșul Luduș	16	5	3	8	24	31	−7	18	
5	Mureșul Rușii-Munți	16	6	3	7	22	24	−2	15 (Note: Mureșul Rușii-Munți deducted 6 points.)	

Rules for classification: 1) Points; 2) Head-to-head points; 3) Head-to-head goal difference; 4) Head-to-head goals scored; 5) Head-to-head away goals scored; 6) Goal difference; 7) Goals scored.
(C) Champions; (Q) Qualified for the phase indicated
Notes:

Championship play-out

Pos	Team	Pld	W	D	L	GF	GA	GD	Pts
6	Acățari	16	11	4	1	43	19	+24	37
7	Iernut	16	9	3	4	36	24	+12	30
8	Avântul Miheșu de Câmpie	16	9	1	6	38	35	+3	28
9	Viitorul 2002 Târnăveni	16	3	2	11	26	40	−14	11
10	Corunca	16	2	2	12	17	42	−25	8

Rules for classification: 1) Points; 2) Head-to-head points; 3) Head-to-head goal difference; 4) Head-to-head goals scored; 5) Head-to-head away goals scored; 6) Goal difference; 7) Goals scored.

=== Neamț County ===
Pos	Team	Pld	W	D	L	GF	GA	GD	Pts	Qualification or relegation
1	Voința Pângărați (C, Q)	30	26	3	1	109	20	+89	81	Qualification to promotion play-off
2	Voința Ion Creangă	30	25	1	4	124	37	+87	76	
3	Dolira Grințieș	30	22	1	7	89	40	+49	67	
4	Victoria Horia	30	19	3	8	81	43	+38	60	
5	Bradul Roznov	30	19	2	9	101	46	+55	59	
6	Biruința Gherăiești	30	16	5	9	92	51	+41	53	
7	Spicul Tămășeni	30	14	4	12	71	78	−7	46	
8	Energia Girov	30	14	3	13	60	71	−11	45	
9	Vulturul Zănești	30	13	4	13	65	71	−6	43	
10	Speranța Răucești	30	13	1	16	78	84	−6	40	
11	Viitorul Podoleni	30	12	3	15	63	72	−9	39	
12	Viitorul Ruginoasa	30	11	0	19	57	93	−36	33	
13	Bradul Borca	30	7	1	22	51	101	−50	22	
14	Olimpic Simionești	30	4	2	24	48	124	−76	14	
15	Stânca Ștefan cel Mare	30	4	2	24	51	137	−86	14	
16	Olimpia Gârcina	30	3	1	26	35	107	−72	10	

Rules for classification: 1) Points; 2) Head-to-head points; 3) Head-to-head goal difference; 4) Head-to-head goals scored; 5) Head-to-head away goals scored; 6) Goal difference; 7) Goals scored.
(C) Champions; (Q) Qualified for the phase indicated

=== Prahova County ===
Pos	Team	Pld	W	D	L	GF	GA	GD	Pts	Qualification or relegation
1	Petrolul Teleajen Ploiești (C, Q)	34	26	6	2	132	14	+118	84	Qualification to promotion play-off
2	Petrolul Ploiești II	34	23	8	3	69	22	+47	77	
3	Intersport Plopeni	34	22	8	4	92	34	+58	74	
4	Avântul Măneciu	34	21	6	7	103	48	+55	69	
5	Petrolul 95 Ploiești	34	18	7	9	77	52	+25	61	
6	Bănești-Urleta	34	15	6	13	74	61	+13	51	
7	Caraimanul Bușteni	34	14	7	13	69	66	+3	49	
8	Cheile Doftanei Brebu	34	14	5	15	57	51	+6	47	
9	Unirea Câmpina	34	14	5	15	58	53	+5	47	
10	Brazi	34	11	10	13	59	63	−4	43	
11	Gloria Vâlcănești	34	13	4	17	63	74	−11	43	
12	Ceptura	34	12	5	17	70	81	−11	41	
13	Voința Bălțești	34	10	6	18	58	102	−44	36	
14	Unirea Brebu	34	8	9	17	52	75	−23	33	
15	Progresul Aluniș (Note: Progresul Aluniș was spared from relegation due to the promotion of Petrolul Teleajen Ploiești to Liga III.)	34	10	3	21	46	100	−54	33	Spared from relegation
16	Florești (R)	34	7	7	20	44	91	−47	28	Relegation to Liga V Prahova
17	Vălenii de Munte (R)	34	7	6	21	29	79	−50	27	Relegation to Liga V Prahova
18	Recolta Dumbrava (Note: Recolta Dumbrava withdrew from championship and lost all the remaining matches with 0–3.) (R)	34	6	2	26	31	117	−86	20	Relegation to Liga V Prahova

Rules for classification: 1) Points; 2) Head-to-head points; 3) Head-to-head goal difference; 4) Head-to-head goals scored; 5) Head-to-head away goals scored; 6) Goal difference; 7) Goals scored.
(C) Champions; (Q) Qualified for the phase indicated; (R) Relegated

=== Satu Mare County ===
Championship final

The championship final was played on 6 June 2009 at Olimpia Stadium in Satu Mare.

Team 1	Score	Team 2
Turul Micula	2–1	Victoria Carei

Turul Micula won the Liga IV Satu Mare County and qualify to promotion play-off in Liga III.

=== Suceava County ===
Pos	Team	Pld	W	D	L	GF	GA	GD	Pts	Qualification or relegation
1	Gura Humorului (C, Q)	28	23	2	3	79	17	+62	71	Qualification to promotion play-off
2	Bucovina Rădăuți	28	17	5	6	65	33	+32	56	
3	Dorna Vatra Dornei	28	16	3	9	84	30	+54	51	
4	Unirea Boroaia	28	13	5	10	51	43	+8	44	
5	Cetatea II Arbore	28	13	2	13	55	48	+7	41	
6	Bradul Putna	28	11	6	11	47	35	+12	39	
7	Viitorul Liteni	28	11	5	12	53	47	+6	38	
8	Nicu Gane Fălticeni	28	10	7	11	45	44	+1	37	
9	Steaua Dumbrăveni	28	11	3	14	55	61	−6	36	
10	Florconstruct Pătrăuți	28	11	3	14	58	75	−17	36	
11	Minerul Iacobeni	28	11	3	14	53	83	−30	36	
12	Foresta Moldovița	28	10	6	12	54	61	−7	36	
13	Avântul Frasin	28	11	2	15	50	58	−8	35	
14	Rapid CFR II Mihoveni (R)	28	10	4	14	50	85	−35	34	Relegation to Liga V Suceava
15	Bradul Vama (R)	28	2	4	22	21	95	−74	10	Relegation to Liga V Suceava
16	Bucovina Bădeuți (Note: Bucovina Bădeuți withdrew from the championship after 12 rounds and all its results were canceled.) (D)	0	0	0	0	0	0	0	0	Expelled

Rules for classification: 1) Points; 2) Head-to-head points; 3) Head-to-head goal difference; 4) Head-to-head goals scored; 5) Head-to-head away goals scored; 6) Goal difference; 7) Goals scored.
(C) Champions; (D) Disqualified; (Q) Qualified for the phase indicated; (R) Relegated

=== Teleorman County ===
Pos	Team	Pld	W	D	L	GF	GA	GD	Pts	Qualification or relegation
1	Alexandria (C, Q)	28	23	4	1	119	15	+104	73	Qualification to promotion play-off
2	Voința Saelele	29	18	4	7	83	35	+48	58	
3	Sporting Roșiori	29	16	5	8	70	39	+31	53	
4	Viață Nouă Olteni	30	14	9	7	72	43	+29	51	
5	Steaua Spătărei	29	15	2	12	55	64	−9	47	
6	Metalul Peretu	29	15	1	13	69	44	+25	46	
7	Unirea Țigănești	29	12	7	10	56	43	+13	43	
8	Flacăra Talpa	27	12	5	10	71	53	+18	41	
9	Dunărea Zimnicea	27	12	5	10	50	40	+10	41	
10	Spicpo Poroschia	29	11	3	15	56	93	−37	36	
11	Rapid Buzescu	28	11	2	15	62	71	−9	35	
12	Turris Turnu Măgurele	28	10	3	15	44	60	−16	33	
13	Iorom Moșteni	27	10	2	15	66	93	−27	32	
14	Foraj Videle	28	8	2	18	45	77	−32	26	
15	Șoimii Scrioaștea (R)	28	2	2	24	23	143	−120	8	Relegation to Liga V Teleorman
16	Mara Alexandria (Note: Mara Alexandria withdrew from the championship.) (D)	9	0	0	9	7	35	−28	0	Withdrew

Rules for classification: 1) Points; 2) Head-to-head points; 3) Head-to-head goal difference; 4) Head-to-head goals scored; 5) Head-to-head away goals scored; 6) Goal difference; 7) Goals scored.
(C) Champions; (D) Disqualified; (Q) Qualified for the phase indicated; (R) Relegated

=== Timiș County ===
Pos	Team	Pld	W	D	L	GF	GA	GD	Pts	Qualification or relegation
1	Recaș (C, Q)	30	23	5	2	108	21	+87	74	Qualification to promotion play-off
2	Chișoda	30	21	4	5	99	30	+69	67	
3	Textila Timișoara	30	15	7	8	56	36	+20	52	
4	Millenium Giarmata	30	15	6	9	56	35	+21	51	
5	Coșteiu	30	16	3	11	56	50	+6	51	
6	Politehnica 2002 Timișoara	30	15	2	13	58	46	+12	47	
7	Peciu Nou	30	13	5	12	57	55	+2	44	
8	Timișul Șag	30	13	4	13	54	50	+4	43	
9	Pobeda Dudeștii Vechi	30	13	3	14	55	61	−6	42	
10	Unirea Cerneteaz	30	12	4	14	56	69	−13	40	
11	Marcel Băban Jimbolia	30	11	5	14	39	52	−13	38	
12	Auto Timișoara	30	11	3	16	52	68	−16	36	
13	Bega Belinț	29	9	5	15	51	70	−19	32	
14	Top Alumino Timișoara	29	8	7	14	35	48	−13	31	
15	Real Dragșina (R)	30	8	3	19	33	77	−44	27	Relegation to Liga V Timiș
16	CFR Timișoara II (R)	30	2	2	26	29	126	−97	8	Relegation to Liga V Timiș

Rules for classification: 1) Points; 2) Head-to-head points; 3) Head-to-head goal difference; 4) Head-to-head goals scored; 5) Head-to-head away goals scored; 6) Goal difference; 7) Goals scored.
(C) Champions; (Q) Qualified for the phase indicated; (R) Relegated

=== Vâlcea County ===
Pos	Team	Pld	W	D	L	GF	GA	GD	Pts	Qualification or relegation
1	Ghecon Lăpușata (C, Q)	34	27	3	4	125	23	+102	84	Qualification to promotion play-off
2	Dinamo Râmnicu Vâlcea	34	25	5	4	107	46	+61	80	
3	Minerul Berbești	34	21	6	7	98	38	+60	69	
4	Drăgășani	34	21	6	7	77	41	+36	69	
5	Șirineasa	34	18	5	11	71	45	+26	59	
6	Sportul Râmnicu Vâlcea	34	19	2	13	88	69	+19	59	
7	Râmnicu Vâlcea II	34	18	3	13	106	81	+25	57	
8	Mihăești	34	17	6	11	83	55	+28	57	
9	Flacăra Horezu	34	16	6	12	85	65	+20	54	
10	Posada Perișani	34	16	2	16	73	93	−20	50	
11	Cozia Călimănești	34	14	5	15	69	62	+7	47	
12	Lotru Brezoi	34	11	8	15	52	63	−11	41	
13	Vartex Râmnicu Vâlcea	34	10	7	17	65	92	−27	37	
14	Damila Măciuca	34	11	4	19	66	88	−22	37	
15	Conexin Runcu (Note: Conexin Runcu was spared from relegation due to the promotion of Ghecon Lăpușata to Liga III.)	34	9	5	20	41	90	−49	32	Spared from relegation
16	Oltețul Zătreni (R)	34	7	5	22	41	83	−42	26	Relegation to Liga V Vâlcea
17	Inter Râmnicu Vâlcea (R)	34	3	3	28	41	123	−82	12	Relegation to Liga V Vâlcea
18	Victoria Frâncești (R)	34	2	1	31	26	160	−134	7	Relegation to Liga V Vâlcea

Rules for classification: 1) Points; 2) Head-to-head points; 3) Head-to-head goal difference; 4) Head-to-head goals scored; 5) Head-to-head away goals scored; 6) Goal difference; 7) Goals scored.
(C) Champions; (Q) Qualified for the phase indicated; (R) Relegated

=== Vrancea County ===
Championship final

Team 1	Score	Team 2
Dumitrești	1–1 (6–4 p)	Flacăra Urechești

Dumitrești won the Liga IV Vrancea County and qualify to promotion play-off in Liga III.

== See also ==
- 2008–09 Liga I
- 2008–09 Liga II
- 2008–09 Liga III
- 2008–09 Cupa României
