= Turnu Măgurele Municipal Stadium =

Multi-use stadium in Turnu Măgurele, Romania

- Interactive map of Turnu Măgurele Municipal Stadium
- Address: Șos. Alexandriei
- Location: Turnu Măgurele, Romania
- Coordinates: 43°45′36.48″N 24°52′38.79″E
- Owner: Municipality of Turnu Măgurele
- Operator: Cetatea Turnu Măgurele; CSM Alexandria
- Capacity: 2,000 seated
- Surface: grass

Construction
- Opened: 1960
- Renovated: 2015, 2017–2018

Tenants
- Cetatea Turnu Măgurele (1962–2013, 2021–present); Sporting Turnu Măgurele (2014–2016); Turris-Oltul (2018–2021); Alexandria (2023–present)

The Turnu Măgurele Municipal Stadium is a multi-use stadium in Turnu Măgurele, Romania. It is used mostly for football matches and is the home ground of Cetatea Turnu Măgurele and temporary of CSM Alexandria. The stadium holds 2,000 people. Between 2017 and 2018 the stadium was completely renovated with an investment of 3 million€.
