= Liga IV Teleorman =

Fourth tier Romanian football league

- Founded: 1968
- Country: Romania
- Level on pyramid: 4
- Promotion to: Liga III
- Relegation to: Liga V Teleorman
- Domestic cup: Cupa României – County phase
- Current champions: Astra Plosca (1st title) (2025–26)
- Most championships: Alexandria and Dunărea Turris Turnu Măgurele (5 titles each)
- Website: frf-ajf.ro/teleorman
- Current: 2025–26 Liga IV Teleorman

Liga IV Teleorman (known as Liga IV Fortuna Sports for sponsorship reasons) is one of the regional football divisions of Liga IV, the fourth tier of the Romanian football league system, for clubs based in Teleorman County, and is organized by AJF Teleorman – Asociația Județeană de Fotbal (lit. 'County Football Association').

It is contested by a variable number of teams, depending on the number of teams relegated from Liga III, the number of teams promoted from Liga V Teleorman, and the teams that withdraw or enter the competition. The winner may or may not be promoted to Liga III, depending on the result of a promotion play-off contested against the winner of a neighboring county series.

== History ==
In 1968, following the new administrative and territorial reorganization of the country, each county established its own football championship, integrating teams from the former regional championships, as well as those that had previously competed in town and rayon level competitions. The freshly formed Teleorman County Championship was placed under the authority of the newly created Consiliul Județean pentru Educație Fizică și Sport (lit. 'County Council for Physical Education and Sports') in Teleorman County.

Since then, the structure and organization of Liga IV Teleorman, as with many other county championships, have undergone numerous changes. Between 1968 and 1992, the main county competition was known as the County Championship. From 1992 to 1997, it was renamed Divizia C – County Phase, followed by Divizia D starting in 1997, and since 2006 it has been known as Liga IV.

== Promotion ==
The champions of each county association play against one another in a play-off to earn promotion to Liga III. Geographical criteria are taken into consideration when the play-offs are drawn. In total, there are 41 county champions plus the Bucharest municipal champion.

== List of Champions ==
=== Teleorman Regional Championship ===
Ed.	Season	Winners
1	1951	Spartac Turnu Măgurele
2	1952	Dinamo Turnu Măgurele

=== Teleorman County Championship ===
Ed.	Season	Winners
1	1968–69	CFR Roșiori
2	1969–70	CFR Roșiori
3	1970–71	Sporting Roșiori
4	1971–72	Teleormanul Troianu
5	1972–73	Cetatea Turnu Măgurele
6	1973–74	Textila Roșiori
7	1974–75	Metalul Alexandria
8	1975–76	Petrolul Videle
9	1976–77	Textila Roșiori
10	1977–78	Dinamo Alexandria
11	1978–79	Textila Roșiori
12	1979–80	Cetatea Turnu Măgurele
13	1980–81	Dunărea Zimnicea
14	1981–82	TCIF Buzescu
15	1982–83	Textila Roșiori
16	1983–84	Metalul Alexandria
17	1984–85	Cetatea Turnu Măgurele
18	1985–86	Cetatea Turnu Măgurele
19	1986–87	Laminorul Zimnicea
20	1987–88	Petrolul Poeni
21	1988–89	Dunărea Zimnicea
22	1989–90	Rulmentul Alexandria
23	1990–91	Petrolul Videle
24	1991–92	Metalul Alexandria
Divizia C – County phase
25	1992–93	Petrolul Videle
26	1993–94	Rulmentul Alexandria
27	1994–95	Spicpo Poroschia
28	1995–96	Spicpo Poroschia
29	1996–97	Rulmentul Alexandria
Divizia D
30	1997–98	Electro-Turris Turnu Măgurele
31	1998–99	ROVA Roșiori
32	1999–00	Robema Roșiori
33	2000–01	Dunărea Zimnicea
34	2001–02	Turris Turnu Măgurele
35	2002–03	Foraj Videle
36	2003–04	Voința Saelele
37	2004–05	Prima Guard Alexandria
38	2005–06	Florea Voicilă Alexandria

Ed.	Season	Winners
Liga IV
39	2006–07	Turris Turnu Măgurele
40	2007–08	Petrolul Videle
41	2008–09	Alexandria
42	2009–10	Dunărea Turris Turnu Măgurele
43	2010–11	Viață Nouă Olteni
44	2011–12	Pamimai Videle
45	2012–13	Sporting Roșiori
46	2013–14	Sporting Roșiori
47	2014–15	Sporting Turnu Măgurele
48	2015–16	Alexandria
49	2016–17	Voința Saelele
50	2017–18	Rapid Buzescu
51	2018–19	Unirea Brânceni
52	2019–20	Unirea Țigănești
53	2020–21	Rapid Buzescu
54	2021–22	Dunărea Turris Turnu Măgurele
55	2022–23	Rapid Buzescu
56	2023–24	Nanov
57	2024–25	Nanov
58	2025–26	Astra Plosca

== See also ==
=== Main Leagues ===
- Liga I
- Liga II
- Liga III
- Liga IV

=== County Leagues (Liga IV series) ===
North–East

- Liga IV Bacău
- Liga IV Botoșani
- Liga IV Iași
- Liga IV Neamț
- Liga IV Suceava
- Liga IV Vaslui

North–West

- Liga IV Bihor
- Liga IV Bistrița-Năsăud
- Liga IV Cluj
- Liga IV Maramureș
- Liga IV Satu Mare
- Liga IV Sălaj

Center

- Liga IV Alba
- Liga IV Brașov
- Liga IV Covasna
- Liga IV Harghita
- Liga IV Mureș
- Liga IV Sibiu

West

- Liga IV Arad
- Liga IV Caraș-Severin
- Liga IV Gorj
- Liga IV Hunedoara
- Liga IV Mehedinți
- Liga IV Timiș

South–West

- Liga IV Argeș
- Liga IV Dâmbovița
- Liga IV Dolj
- Liga IV Olt
- Liga IV Teleorman
- Liga IV Vâlcea

South

- Liga IV Bucharest
- Liga IV Călărași
- Liga IV Giurgiu
- Liga IV Ialomița
- Liga IV Ilfov
- Liga IV Prahova

South–East

- Liga IV Brăila
- Liga IV Buzău
- Liga IV Constanța
- Liga IV Galați
- Liga IV Tulcea
- Liga IV Vrancea
