= 2020–21 Cupa României =

Cupa României 2020–21
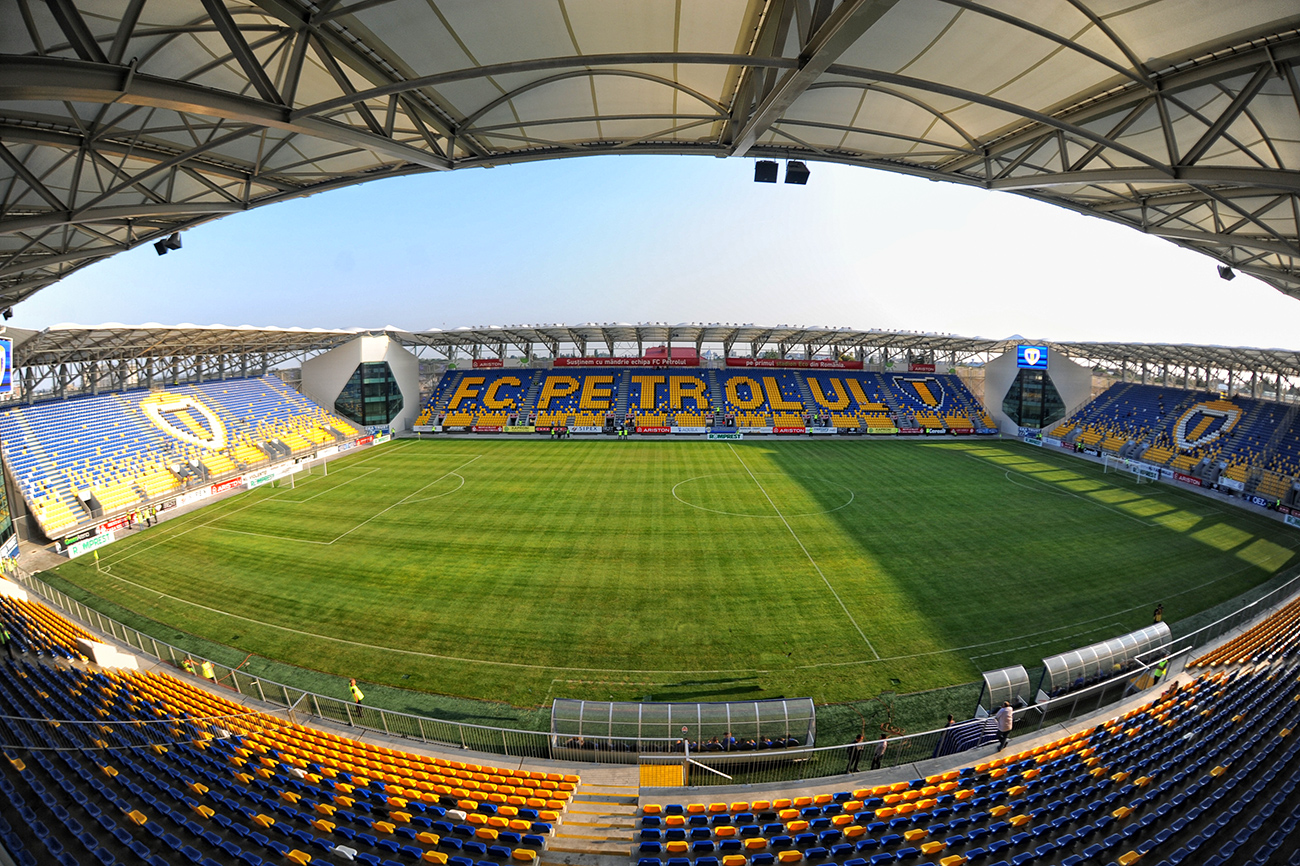

Tournament details
- Country: Romania
- Teams: 145

Final positions
- Champions: Universitatea Craiova
- Runners-up: Astra Giurgiu

The 2020–21 Cupa României was the 83rd season of the annual Romanian primary football knockout tournament. The winner qualified for the second qualifying round of the 2021–22 UEFA Europa Conference League. Times up to 26 October 2020 and from 29 March 2021 are EEST (UTC+3). Times between 27 October 2020 and 28 March 2021 are EET (UTC+2).

== Participating clubs ==
The following 128 teams qualified for the competition:

2019–20 Liga I all clubs (14)	2019–20 Liga II; Without dissolved clubs (18)	2019–20 Liga III; Without second teams and some dissolved clubs (72)
CFR Cluj; Universitatea Craiova; Astra Giurgiu; Botoșani; FCSB; Gaz Metan Mediaș; Viitorul Constanța; Hermannstadt; Sepsi OSK; Academica Clinceni; Voluntari; Politehnica Iași; Dinamo București; Chindia Târgoviște	UTA Arad; Argeș Pitești; Mioveni; Petrolul Ploiești; Turris Turnu Măgurele; Rapid București; Metaloglobus București; SCM Gloria Buzău; Farul Constanța; Viitorul Târgu Jiu; ASU Politehnica Timișoara; Dunărea Călărași; Ripensia Timișoara; Universitatea Cluj; CSM Reșița; Concordia Chiajna; Miercurea Ciuc; Pandurii Târgu Jiu	Aerostar Bacău; Unirea Slobozia; CSM Slatina; FC U Craiova; Comuna Recea; Progresul Spartac București; Mostiștea Ulmu; Minaur Baia Mare; Foresta Suceava; Șoimii Lipova; Ceahlăul Piatra Neamț; Afumați; Flacăra Moreni; Crișul Chișineu-Criș; Viitorul Șelimbăr; Bucovina Rădăuți; Tunari; Alexandria; Flacăra Horezu; Cugir; Focșani; Înainte Modelu; Progresul Pecica; Luceafărul Oradea; Oțelul Galați; Popești-Leordeni; Vedița Colonești; Dumbrăvița; Sânmartin; Știința Miroslava; Viitorul Ianca; Unirea Bascov; Hunedoara; 1. FC Gloria; Ozana Târgu Neamț; Făurei; Blejoi; Ghiroda; Avântul Reghin; Șomuz Fălticeni; Agricola Borcea; Olimpic Cetate Râșnov; Gloria Lunca-Teuz Cermei; Sticla Arieșul Turda; Sporting Liești; Poseidon Limanu-2 Mai; Fortuna Becicherecu Mic; Unirea Dej; KSE Târgu Secuiesc; Metalul Buzău; SR Brașov; SR Brașov; Viitorul Dăești; Sănătatea Cluj; Hușana Huși; Medgidia; Pucioasa; Deva; Unirea Alba Iulia; Axiopolis Cernavodă; Filiași; Dacia Unirea Brăila; Balotești; Poli Timișoara; Industria Galda; CSM Bacău; Odorheiu Secuiesc; Pașcani; Recolta Gheorghe Doja; Sporting Roșiori; Gilortul Târgu Cărbunești; SCM Zalău
24 out of 42 representatives of regional associations^{1}
Universitatea Alba Iulia (Alba); None (Arad); None (Argeș); Viitorul Curița (Bacău); None (Bihor); None (Bistrița-Năsăud); Dante Botoșani (Botoșani); Olimpic Zărnești (Brașov); Victoria Traian (Brăila); CSA Steaua București (Bucharest); Râmnicu Sărat (Buzău); None (Caraș-Severin); Oltenița (Călărași); Arieşul Mihai Viteazu (Cluj)	Victoria Cumpăna (Constanța); None (Covasna); Gloria Cornești (Dâmbovița); None (Dolj); None (Galați); Dunărea Giurgiu (Giurgiu); Jiul Rovinari (Gorj); None (Harghita); Jiul Petroșani (Hunedoara); Înfrățirea Jilavele (Ialomița); None (Iași); None (Ilfov); Sighetu Marmației (Maramureș); None (Mehedinți)	Unirea Ungheni (Mureș); None (Neamț); None (Olt); None (Prahova); Olimpia MCMXXI (Satu Mare); Sportul Şimleu Silvaniei (Sălaj); None (Sibiu); None (Suceava); None (Teleorman); Pobeda Star Bisnov (Timiș); Flacăra Mihail Kogălniceanu (Tulcea); CSM Vaslui (Vaslui); Minerul Costești (Vâlcea); Victoria Gugești (Vrancea)

== Round and draw dates ==
Round	Draw date	First match date
First Round	26 August 2020	9 September 2020
Second Round	16 September 2020	22 September 2020
Third Round	30 September 2020	6 October 2020
Fourth Round	12 October 2020	20 October 2020
Round of 32	9 November 2020	27 November 2020
Round of 16	12 January 2021	9 February 2021
Quarter-finals	15 February 2021	2 March 2021
Semi-finals	16 March 2021	13 April 2021
Final	-	22 May 2021

== Preliminary rounds ==
The first rounds, and any preliminaries, are organised by the Regional Leagues.

== First round ==
All matches were played on 9 September 2020.

Team 1	Score	Team 2
9 September 2020
Minerul Costești (3)	0–5	Viitorul Dăești (3)
Jiul Rovinari (4)	w/o	Filiași (3)
Jiul Petroșani (3)	w/o	Gilortul Târgu Cărbunești (3)
Deva (3)	0–1	Ghiroda (3)
Pobeda Star Bisnov (4)	4–2	Fortuna Becicherecu Mic (3)
Poli Timișoara (3)	2–2 (a.e.t.) (2–4 p)	Gloria Lunca-Teuz Cermei (3)
Sportul Șimleu Silvaniei (3)	1–1 (a.e.t.) (7–6 p)	SCM Zalău (3)
Universitatea Alba Iulia (4)	1–1 (a.e.t.) (2–4 p)	Unirea Alba Iulia (3)
Sănătatea Cluj (3)	1–1 (a.e.t.) (1–3 p)	Unirea Dej (3)
Arieșul Mihai Viteazu (4)	w/o	Industria Galda (3)
Unirea Ungheni (3)	4–1	Sticla Arieșul Turda (3)
Odorheiu Secuiesc (3)	2–0	Avântul Reghin (3)
KSE Târgu Secuiesc (3)	1–1 (a.e.t.) (3–5 p)	SR Brașov (3)
Olimpic Zărnești (4)	1–0	Olimpic Cetate Râșnov (3)
Gloria Cornești (4)	w/o	Pucioasa (3)
Dunărea Giurgiu (4)	1–7	Sporting Roșiori (3)
Steaua București (3)	6–0	Balotești (3)
Oltenița (3)	w/o	Agricola Borcea (3)
Înfrățirea Jilavele (4)	1–3	Recolta Gheorghe Doja (3)
Râmnicu Sărat (3)	1–2	Metalul Buzău (3)
Victoria Cumpăna (4)	w/o	Poseidon Limanu-2 Mai (3)
Medgidia (3)	w/o	Axiopolis Cernavodă (3)
Flacăra Mihail Kogălniceanu (4)	0–4	Dacia Unirea Brăila (3)
Victoria Traian (4)	w/o	Făurei (3)
CSM Vaslui (4)	0–5	Hușana Huși (3)
Victoria Gugești (4)	0–4	Sporting Liești (3)
Viitorul Curița (4)	w/o	CSM Bacău (3)
Pașcani (3)	w/o	Ozana Târgu Neamț (3)
Dante Botoșani (3)	0–3	Șomuz Fălticeni (3)
Olimpia MCMXXI (4)	0–1	Sighetu Marmației (4)

== Second round ==
All matches were played on 22 September 2020.

Team 1	Score	Team 2
22 September 2020
Unirea Dej (3)	7–0	1. FC Gloria (3)
Sighetu Marmației (4)	1–2	Sportul Șimleu Silvaniei (3)
Sânmartin (3)	2–2 (a.e.t.) (6–5 p)	Luceafărul Oradea (3)
Crișul Chișineu-Criș (3)	0–2	Șoimii Lipova (3)
Gloria Lunca-Teuz Cermei (3)	3–1	Progresul Pecica (3)
Pobeda Star Bisnov (4)	0–1 (a.e.t.)	Dumbrăvița (3)
Ghiroda (3)	4–1	Hunedoara (3)
Unirea Ungheni (3)	0–1	Odorheiu Secuiesc (3)
Industria Galda (3)	w/o	Unirea Alba Iulia (3)
Cugir (3)	3–4	Viitorul Șelimbăr (3)
Viitorul Dăești (3)	5–0	Flacăra Horezu (3)
Sporting Roșiori (3)	w/o	Alexandria (3)
Unirea Bascov (3)	w/o	Vedița Colonești (3)
Olimpic Zărnești (4)	w/o	SR Brașov (3)
Pucioasa (3)	2–1	Flacăra Moreni (3)
Metalul Buzău (3)	2–2 (a.e.t.) (5–4 p)	Blejoi (3)
Steaua București (3)	0–1	Popești-Leordeni (3)
Tunari (3)	0–3	Afumați (3)
Agricola Borcea (3)	3–1	Înainte Modelu (3)
Victoria Cumpăna (4)	w/o	Axiopolis Cernavodă (3)
Recolta Gheorghe Doja (3)	2–3	Făurei (3)
Dacia Unirea Brăila (3)	4–1	Viitorul Ianca (3)
Oțelul Galați (3)	0–1	Focșani (3)
Hușana Huși (3)	2–1	Sporting Liești (3)
CSM Bacău (3)	0–4	Ceahlăul Piatra Neamț (3)
Pașcani (3)	0–2 (a.e.t.)	Știința Miroslava (3)
Șomuz Fălticeni (3)	w/o	Bucovina Rădăuți (3)

== Third round ==
The matches were played on 6,7 and 8 October 2020.

Team 1	Score	Team 2
6 October 2020
Odorheiu Secuiesc (3)	0–2	Miercurea Ciuc (2)
Alexandria (3)	0–3	Slatina (2)
Ghiroda (3)	4–2	Dumbrăvița (3)
Popești-Leordeni (3)	0–1	Progresul Spartac București (3)
Gloria Lunca-Teuz Cermei (3)	w/o	Șoimii Lipova (3)
7 October 2020
FC U Craiova (2)	1–1 (a.e.t.) (5–3 p)	CSM Reșița (2)
Mostiștea Ulmu (3)	3–1	Unirea Slobozia (2)
Afumați (3)	2–3	Concordia Chiajna (2)
Axiopolis Cernavodă (3)	6–3	Agricola Borcea (3)
Dacia Unirea Brăila (3)	4–0	Făurei (3)
Metalul Buzău (3)	0–2	Focșani (3)
Hușana Huși (3)	2–1	Știința Miroslava (3)
Șomuz Fălticeni (3)	2–0	Foresta Suceava (3)
Pucioasa (3)	1–1 (a.e.t.) (2–4 p)	SR Brașov (3)
Viitorul Dăești (3)	2–2 (a.e.t.) (4–3 p)	Vedița Colonești (3)
Sportul Șimleu Silvaniei (3)	1–2	Sânmartin (3)
Ceahlăul Piatra Neamț (3)	w/o	Aerostar Bacău (2)
Minaur Baia Mare (3)	0–2	Comuna Recea (2)
8 October 2020
Filiași (3)	2–0	Pandurii Târgu Jiu (2)
Unirea Dej (3)	0–2	Universitatea Cluj (2)

== Fourth round ==
The matches were played on 20 and 21 October 2020.

Team 1	Score	Team 2
20 October 2020
Slatina (2)	0–0 (a.e.t.) (2–4 p)	Turris-Oltul Turnu Măgurele (2)
Progresul Spartac București (3)	3–2 (a.e.t.)	Rapid București (2)
Șoimii Lipova (3)	0–1	Ripensia Timişoara (2)
Filiași (3)	0–4	FC U Craiova (2)
Viitorul Șelimbăr (3)	0–3	Universitatea Cluj (2)
21 October 2020
SR Brașov (3)	0–1 (a.e.t.)	Miercurea Ciuc (2)
Ghiroda (3)	3–4 (a.e.t.)	Politehnica Timişoara (2)
Mostiștea Ulmu (3)	1–2	Dunărea Călăraşi (2)
Concordia Chiajna (2)	1–0	Mioveni (2)
Axiopolis Cernavodă (3)	1–1 (a.e.t.) (3–5 p)	Farul Constanța (2)
Dacia Unirea Brăila (3)	1–2	Gloria Buzău (2)
Hușana Huși (3)	1–0	Focșani (3)
Șomuz Fălticeni (3)	0–4	Ceahlăul Piatra Neamț (3)
Viitorul Dăești (3)	1–2 (a.e.t.)	Viitorul Târgu Jiu (2)
Sânmartin (3)	4–3	Comuna Recea (2)
Metaloglobus București (2)	1–2 (a.e.t.)	Petrolul Ploiești (2)

== Round of 32 ==
The matches were played on 27, 28, 29 and 30 November 2020.

Team 1	Score	Team 2
27 November 2020
Chindia Târgoviște (1)	1–1 (a.e.t.) (4–2 p)	Hermannstadt (1)
Progresul Spartac București (3)	0–5	Universitatea Craiova (1)
28 November 2020
Turris-Oltul Turnu Măgurele (2)	1–0	Sepsi OSK (1)
Sânmartin (3)	0–1	Dunărea Călăraşi (2)
FC U Craiova (2)	1–3	Politehnica Timișoara (2)
Farul Constanța (2)	2–1	Academica Clinceni (1)
Concordia Chiajna (2)	0–2	Botoșani (1)
Viitorul Târgu Jiu (2)	1–0	Argeș Pitești (1)
Ceahlăul Piatra Neamț (3)	1–2	Petrolul Ploiești (2)
Dinamo București (1)	3–0	Viitorul Constanța (1)
29 November 2020
Ripensia Timişoara (2)	1–5	Astra Giurgiu (1)
Hușana Huși (3)	2–8	Universitatea Cluj (2)
Voluntari (1)	0–6	Gaz Metan Mediaș (1)
Politehnica Iași (1)	1–0	CFR Cluj (1)
30 November 2020
Miercurea Ciuc (2)	0–2	UTA Arad (1)
Gloria Buzău (2)	0–3	FCSB (1)

== Round of 16 ==
The matches were played on 9, 10 and 11 February 2021.

Team 1	Score	Team 2
9 February 2021
Dunărea Călăraşi (2)	3–0	Turris-Oltul Turnu Măgurele (2)
Petrolul Ploiești (2)	3–0	Politehnica Iași (1)
10 February 2021
Farul Constanța (2)	0–3	Chindia Târgoviște (1)
Universitatea Cluj (2)	2–1	UTA Arad (1)
Dinamo București (1)	1–0	FCSB (1)
11 February 2021
Viitorul Târgu Jiu (2)	1–0	Gaz Metan Mediaș (1)
Politehnica Timișoara (2)	1–2	Astra Giurgiu (1)
Botoșani (1)	0–1	Universitatea Craiova (1)

== Quarter-finals ==
The matches were played on 2, 3 and 4 March 2021.

Team 1	Score	Team 2
Chindia Târgoviște (1)	0–1	Universitatea Craiova (1)
Petrolul Ploiești (2)	0–3	Astra Giurgiu (1)
Universitatea Cluj (2)	1–3	Viitorul Târgu Jiu (2)
Dunărea Călăraşi (2)	1–3	Dinamo București (1)

== Semi-finals ==
The semi-final matches are played in a two-legged system. The first legs were played 13 and 14 April 2021 and the second legs were played on 11 May 2021.

Team 1	Agg.	Team 2	1st leg	2nd leg
Astra Giurgiu (1)	1–1 (5–4 p)	Dinamo București (1)	1–0	0–1 (a.e.t.)
Universitatea Craiova (1)	5–2	Viitorul Târgu Jiu (2)	3–0	2–2

== Final ==
22 May 2021	Astra Giurgiu	2–3 (a.e.t.)	Universitatea Craiova	Ploiești
20:30 EET (UTC+3)	Valerică Găman 17'; Yann Boé-Kane 93'		Andrei Ivan 14'; Dan Nistor 100'; Vladimir Screciu 113'	Stadium: Ilie Oană Stadium; Attendance: 1,500; Referee: Horațiu Feșnic

Cupa României 2020–21 winners

8th title
