= Eugen Anghel =

Romanian footballer

Personal information
- Full name: Eugen Cătălin Anghel
- Date of birth: 3 December 1973 (age 52)
- Place of birth: Pitești, Romania
- Height: 1.89 m (6 ft 2 in)
- Position: Goalkeeper

Team information
- Current team: Universitatea Cluj (GK coach)

Youth career
- –1993: CSȘ Aripi Pitești

Senior career*
Years	Team	Apps	(Gls)
1993–1994	Rocar București	23	(0)
1994–1995	ARO Câmpulung		
1995–1997	Gloria Bistrița	1	(0)
1997–1999	Rulmentul Alexandria (Note: The statistics for the 1997–98 Divizia C season are unavailable.)	31	(1)
1999–2000	Ceahlăul Piatra Neamț	12	(0)
2000–2001	Gloria Bistrița	1	(0)
2001–2002	Rapid București	6	(0)
2001–2002	Electromagnetica București	1	(0)
2002–2006	Gloria Bistrița	2	(0)
2005–2006	Gloria II Bistrița	28	(0)
Total		105	(1)

Managerial career
- 2013–2014: SCM Pitești (GK coach)
- 2014–2021: Romania U21 (GK coach)
- 2021–2022: FC U Craiova (GK coach)
- 2022–2023: Argeș Pitești (GK coach)
- 2024–2025: FC U Craiova (GK coach)
- 2025: SCM Râmnicu Vâlcea (GK coach)
- 2025–: Universitatea Cluj (GK coach)
- * Club domestic league appearances and goals

Eugen Cătălin Anghel (born 3 December 1973) is a Romanian former professional footballer who played as a goalkeeper, currently goalkeeping coach at Liga I club Universitatea Cluj.

== Honours ==
ARO Câmpulung

- Divizia C: 1994–95

Gloria Bistrița

- Cupa României runner-up: 1995–96

Rulmentul Alexandria

- Divizia C: 1997–98

Rapid București

- Cupa României: 2001–02
