= Florea Voicilă =

Romanian footballer

Personal information
- Date of birth: 1 January 1954 (age 72)
- Place of birth: Mârzănești, Romania
- Position: Forward

Senior career*
Years	Team	Apps	(Gls)
1967–1970	Recolta Mârzănești		
1971–1974	Automatica Alexandria		
1974	Rapid București	2	(0)
1975–1986	Automatica Alexandria		
1987	Chimia Râmnicu Vâlcea		
1987	Rova Roșiori		
1988–1998	Rulmentul Alexandria		

International career
1976	Romania U23	2	(0)
1978	Romania	2	(0)

Managerial career
- Rulmentul Alexandria
- Unirea Alexandria
- CS Nanov
- FCM Alexandria
- Unirea Țigănești
- * Club domestic league appearances and goals

Florea Voicilă (born 1 January 1954) is a Romanian politician, former football forward and manager. He spent most of his playing career in the Romanian lower leagues, with only two short spells in the first league at Rapid București and Chimia Râmnicu Vâlcea, scoring about 465 goals throughout his career. After he retired from playing football, Voicilă worked as a manager in the Romanian lower leagues, president at FCM Alexandria and as a local councilor of Alexandria. His sons Dănuț Narcis and Ionuț Florin were also footballers, the first one managed to play in the first league, being also a manager in the Romanian lower leagues and the second one played only in the Romanian lower leagues.

== International career ==
Florea Voicilă played two friendly games at international level for Romania, earning his caps while playing in the second division for Automatica Alexandria. He made his debut under coach Ștefan Kovács when he came as a substitute and replaced Mihai Zamfir in the 83rd minute of a 2–1 loss against Greece. He also played in a 1–1 against Israel, when he came, as a substitute and replaced Nicolae Dobrin in the 56th minute.

== Political career ==
Since 2004, Voicilă has been a local councillor in Alexandria, representing the Social Democratic Party.

== Honours ==
=== Player ===
Rulmentul Alexandria

- Divizia C: 1973–74, 1997–98
