= Romulus Ciobanu =

Romanian footballer (born 1977)

Personal information
- Full name: Romulus Marius Ciobanu
- Date of birth: 18 June 1977 (age 49)
- Place of birth: Pucioasa, Romania
- Position: Midfielder

Youth career
- 1997–1998: FCU Craiova

Senior career*
Years	Team	Apps	(Gls)
1998–2000	Cimentul Fieni		
2001–2002	Drobeta-Turnu Severin		
2002–2003	Metalul Plopeni		
2003–2004	Zimbru Chișinău		
2004–2005	Politehnica Timișoara	8	(0)
2005	FC Vaslui		
2005–2006	Astra Ploiești		
2005–2006	Juventus București		
2006–2007	Astra Ploiești		

Managerial career
- 2007–2008: Viitorul Pucioasa
- 2008–2009: FCM Alexandria
- 2009–2010: Intersport Plopeni
- 2010–2011: FC Caransebeș
- 2012: CS Ștefănești
- 2014–2017: FCM Alexandria
- 2017–2018: Petrolul Ploieşti
- 2019: Pucioasa
- 2019–2021: Sporting Roșiori
- * Club domestic league appearances and goals

Romulus Ciobanu (born 18 June 1977) is a Romanian former footballer who played as a midfielder. He is currently a coach.

== Career ==
Ciobanu was born in Pucioasa, Dâmbovița County. He began his youth career at Universitatea Craiova and made his debut at Cimentul Fieni, a team with which in 1998 he also managed to promote in Divizia B.

After Cimentul Fieni he moved to Drobeta-Turnu Severin, a team with whom he also promoted in Divizia B.

He made his debut in the Divizia A at 27 years old for Politehnica Timișoara where he played in the 2004–05 season.
