= Gigel Ene =

Romanian footballer

Personal information
- Full name: Gigel Bogdan Ene
- Date of birth: 4 September 1982 (age 44)
- Place of birth: București, Romania
- Height: 1.79 m (5 ft 10 1/2 in)
- Position: Midfielder

Senior career*
Years	Team	Apps	(Gls)
2002–2004	Rulmentul Alexandria	44	(10)
2004–2006	Rapid II București	51	(10)
2006	Rapid București	0	(0)
2006	Ceahlăul Piatra Neamț	10	(3)
2006–2007	Otopeni	28	(8)
2007–2010	FC Snagov	57	(16)
2010–2011	Gloria Bistrița	6	(0)
2011–2012	Râmnicu Vâlcea	15	(0)
2012	Juventus București	?	(?)
Total		211	(47)
- * Club domestic league appearances and goals as of 16 February 2016 ‡ National team caps and goals as of 3 March 2010

Gigel Bogdan Ene (born 4 September 1982) is a Romanian former professional soccer player.
