= Florin Olteanu (footballer) =

Romanian footballer

Personal information
- Date of birth: 30 June 1981 (age 45)
- Place of birth: Alexandria, Romania
- Height: 1.85 m (6 ft 1 in)
- Position: Goalkeeper

Team information
- Current team: Cetatea Turnu Măgurele
- Number: 81

Youth career
- 1996–1999: CSȘ Alexandria

Senior career*
Years	Team	Apps	(Gls)
1999	Rulmentul Alexanria		
2000–2001	Astra Ploiești	0	(0)
2000–2001	→ Metalul Plopeni	6	(0)
2003–2005	Petrolul Ploiești	22	(0)
2005–2009	Astra Ploiești	3	(0)
2007	→ Jiul Petroșani (loan)	19	(0)
2008–2009	→ Unirea Alba Iulia (loan)	5	(0)
2009	→ FC Snagov (loan)	14	(0)
2009–2010	Săgeata Stejaru	34	(0)
2010–2013	Săgeata Năvodari	36	(0)
2013–2015	Unirea Brânceni		
2015–2021	Alexandria	106	(0)
2022–	Cetatea Turnu Măgurele	12	(0)

Managerial career
- 2022–: Cetatea Turnu Măgurele (GK Coach)
- * Club domestic league appearances and goals as of 20:24, 22 December 2024 (UTC)

Florin Olteanu (born 30 June 1981) is a Romanian footballer who plays as a goalkeeper for Liga III side Cetatea Turnu Măgurele. In his career Olteanu also played for teams such as Astra Ploiești, Petrolul Ploiești, Jiul Petroșani, Unirea Alba Iulia, Săgeata Stejaru or Săgeata Năvodari, among others.
