= Liviu Floricel =

Romanian footballer

Personal information
- Full name: Liviu Marius Floricel
- Date of birth: 30 July 1987 (age 39)
- Place of birth: Roșiorii de Vede, Romania
- Height: 1.89 m (6 ft 2 in)
- Position: Defender

Team information
- Current team: Astra Plosca (manager)

Youth career
- ROVA Roșiori

Senior career*
Years	Team	Apps	(Gls)
2004–2005	Internațional	6	(0)
2005	ROVA Roșiori	22	(5)
2005–2010	Ceahlăul Piatra Neamț	22	(0)
2008–2009	→ Știința Bacău (loan)	5	(1)
2010	→ Poiana Câmpina (loan)	7	(0)
2010–2012	Callatis Mangalia	24	(2)
2012	→ Petrolul Videle	9	(0)
2012–2013	Alexandria	27	(1)
2013	→ Voluntari (loan)	10	(0)
2013–2016	Sporting Roşiori	56	(11)
2017–2018	Alexandria	36	(17)
2018–2019	Sporting Roșiori	16	(15)
2020–2021	Flacăra Moreni	9	(1)
Total		249	(53)

Managerial career
- 2021–: Astra Plosca
- * Club domestic league appearances and goals as of 09:06, 2 November 2021 (UTC)

Liviu Marius Floricel (born 30 July 1987) is a Romanian former footballer who played as a defender for teams such as ROVA Roșiori, Ceahlăul Piatra Neamț, Callatis Mangalia, FCM Alexandria, Sporting Roşiori or Flacăra Moreni, among others. He is currently the manager of Liga IV side Astra Plosca.
