= 2018–19 Liga III =

Liga III
- Season: 2018–19
- Country: Romania
- Teams: 80
- Promoted: SCM Gloria Buzău; Rapid București; Turris Turnu Măgurele; CSMȘ Reșița; Miercurea Ciuc
- Relegated: Unirea Tășnad; Sportul Chiscani; Millenium Giarmata; Oltenița; MSE Târgu Mureș; Râmnicu Sărat; Hermannstadt II; Lugoj; Gaz Metan II Mediaș; Sănătatea Darabani; Iernut; Ocna Mureș; Viitorul Domnești; Delta Dobrogea Tulcea; Roman; Bragadiru
- Matches: 1,140
- Goals: 3,689 (3.24 per match)
- Biggest home win: Recea 10–0 MSE
- Biggest away win: Axiopolis 1–9 Rapid
- Highest scoring: CSU II 10–1 Domnești; Rapid 10–1 Făurei
- Longest winning run: 17 matches: SCM Gloria Buzău
- Longest unbeaten run: 27 matches: SCM Gloria Buzău
- Longest winless run: 30 matches: Viitorul Domnești
- Longest losing run: 28 matches: Delta Dobrogea Tulcea
- All statistics correct as of 26 May 2019.

The 2018–19 Liga III was the 63rd season of Liga III, the third tier of the Romanian football league system. The season began on 24 August 2018 and ended on 25 May 2019.

== Team changes ==
=== To Liga III ===
Promoted from Liga IV

- 1. FC Gloria
  (debut)
- Bragadiru
  (debut)
- Ceahlăul Piatra Neamț
  (after 38 years of absence)
- Crișul Chișineu-Criș
  (after 26 years of absence)
- Dumbrăvița
  (debut)
- Făurei
  (after 12 years of absence)
- FC U Craiova
  (debut)
- Flacăra Horezu
  (after 17 years of absence)
- SCM Gloria Buzău
  (debut)
- Hunedoara
  (after 2 years of absence)
- Medgidia
  (after 8 years of absence)
- Minaur Baia Mare
  (after 3 years of absence)
- MSE Târgu Mureș
  (debut)
- Ocna Mureș
  (after 11 years of absence)
- Rapid București
  (debut)
- SR Brașov
  (debut)
- Sticla Arieșul Turda
  (after 4 years of absence)
- Șomuz Fălticeni
  (debut)
- Unirea Bascov
  (debut)

Relegated from Liga II

- Afumați
  (after 2 years of absence)
- Știința Miroslava
  (after 1 year of absence)
- Foresta Suceava
  (after 6 years of absence)

=== From Liga III ===
Relegated to Liga IV

- Internațional Bălești
  (ended 1-year stay)
- Avântul Valea Mărului
  (ended 2-year stay)
- Victoria Traian
  (ended 1-year stay)
- Urban Titu
  (ended 11-year stay)
- Nuova Mama Mia Becicherecu Mic
  (ended 5-year stay)
- Viitorul Ghimbav
  (ended 1-year stay)
- Metalosport Galați
  (ended 4-year stay)

Promoted to Liga II

- Aerostar Bacău
  (ended 19-year stay)
- Farul Constanța
  (ended 1-year stay)
- Petrolul Ploiești
  (ended 1-year stay)
- Șirineasa
  (ended 2-year stay)
- Universitatea Cluj
  (ended 1-year stay)

=== Excluded teams ===
After the end of the previous season, Târgu Mureș and Olimpia Satu Mare were dissolved.

Concordia II Chiajna and Mioveni II withdrew from Liga III.

Venus Independența withdrew due to financial problems.

Performanța Ighiu withdrew due to financial problems.

Gauss Bacău withdrew due to financial problems.

=== Teams spared from relegation ===
Metaloglobus București was spared from relegation to Liga III due to withdrawal of Afumați.

Sportul Chiscani, Pașcani, Iernut, Viitorul Domnești, Delta Dobrogea Tulcea and Unirea Dej and were spared from relegation to Liga IV due to lack of teams in the Liga III.

=== Other teams ===
Afumați withdrew from Liga II after the end of the last season and was enrolled instead in the Liga III, a move made due to financial reasons.

Reserve team of FC Botoșani was enrolled in the championship instead of Gauss Bacău which withdrew due to financial problems.

=== Renamed teams ===
ACS Dumitra moved from Dumitra to Bistrița and changed the club's name to 1. FC Gloria. The club would like to be considered the successor of ACF Gloria Bistrița, but it does not own its brand and record yet.

FC Aninoasa moved from Aninoasa to Pucioasa and changed its name to FC Pucioasa.

FCM Alexandria was renamed as CSM Alexandria.

ACS Ghiroda was renamed as CSC Ghiroda.

Voința Turnu Măgurele was renamed as Turris-Oltul Turnu Măgurele.

== League tables ==
=== Seria I ===
Pos	Team	Pld	W	D	L	GF	GA	GD	Pts	Promotion or relegation
1	SCM Gloria Buzău (C, P)	28	23	4	1	77	17	+60	73	Promotion to Liga II
2	Bucovina Rădăuți	28	18	3	7	51	19	+32	57	
3	Oțelul Galați	28	17	5	6	48	29	+19	56	
4	Știința Miroslava	28	16	2	10	43	32	+11	50	
5	Foresta Suceava	28	14	7	7	50	39	+11	49	
6	Focșani	28	13	7	8	39	26	+13	46	
7	Metalul Buzău	28	13	6	9	47	34	+13	45	
8	Sporting Liești	28	12	4	12	41	36	+5	40	
9	KSE Târgu Secuiesc	28	11	4	13	46	51	−5	37	
10	Ceahlăul Piatra Neamț	28	10	5	13	35	34	+1	35	
11	Șomuz Fălticeni	28	8	5	15	28	54	−26	29	
12	Botoșani II (O)	28	8	4	16	29	45	−16	28	Possible relegation to Liga IV
13	Pașcani (R)	28	7	4	17	33	51	−18	25	Relegation to Liga IV
14	Râmnicu Sărat (R)	28	4	6	18	22	51	−29	18	Relegation to Liga IV
15	Sănătatea Darabani (R)	28	2	2	24	21	92	−71	8	Relegation to Liga IV
16	Roman (Note: Roman withdrew from the championship after 10 rounds and all the results were canceled.) (D)	0	0	0	0	0	0	0	0	Expelled

Source: FRF (in Romanian), Soccerway
Rules for classification: 1) Points; 2) Head-to-head points; 3) Head-to-head goal difference; 4) Head-to-head goals scored; 5) Head-to-head away goals scored; 6) Goal difference; 7) Goals scored.
(C) Champions; (D) Disqualified; (O) Play-off winners; (P) Promoted; (R) Relegated

=== Seria II ===
Pos	Team	Pld	W	D	L	GF	GA	GD	Pts	Promotion or relegation
1	Rapid București (C, P)	28	24	3	1	97	18	+79	75	Promotion to Liga II
2	Afumați	28	20	4	4	76	26	+50	64	
3	Progresul Spartac București	28	19	3	6	64	26	+38	60 (Note: Unirea Slobozia–Progresul Spartac București 3–2; Progresul Spartac București–Unirea Slobozia 2–0)	
4	Unirea Slobozia	28	19	3	6	68	35	+33	60	
5	Popești-Leordeni	28	15	3	10	55	39	+16	48	
6	Tunari	28	11	10	7	57	31	+26	43	
7	Înainte Modelu	28	11	3	14	45	54	−9	36	
8	Făurei	28	10	5	13	35	59	−24	35	
9	Axiopolis Cernavodă	28	8	9	11	36	51	−15	33	
10	Medgidia	28	9	5	14	33	60	−27	32	
11	FCSB II	28	9	3	16	52	61	−9	30 (Note: Agricola Borcea–FCSB II 5–3; FCSB II–Agricola Borcea 2–0)	
12	Agricola Borcea (R)	28	9	3	16	47	84	−37	30	Possible relegation to Liga IV
13	Sportul Chiscani (R)	28	8	4	16	51	66	−15	28	Relegation to Liga IV
14	Oltenița (R)	28	6	6	16	31	61	−30	24	Relegation to Liga IV
15	Delta Dobrogea Tulcea (Note: Delta Dobrogea Tulcea were deducted 80 points for unpaid debts, withdrew during the winter break and lost all matches from the second part by forfeit.) (R)	28	0	0	28	4	80	−76	−80	Relegation to Liga IV
16	Bragadiru (Note: Bragadiru withdrew from the championship after six rounds and all the results were canceled.) (D)	0	0	0	0	0	0	0	0	Expelled

Source: FRF (in Romanian), Soccerway
Rules for classification: 1) Points; 2) Head-to-head points; 3) Head-to-head goal difference; 4) Head-to-head goals scored; 5) Head-to-head away goals scored; 6) Goal difference; 7) Goals scored.
(C) Champions; (D) Disqualified; (P) Promoted; (R) Relegated

=== Seria III ===
Pos	Team	Pld	W	D	L	GF	GA	GD	Pts	Promotion or relegation
1	Turris Turnu Măgurele (C, P)	30	23	5	2	87	15	+72	74	Promotion to Liga II
2	FC U Craiova	30	19	5	6	70	25	+45	62	
3	Flacăra Horezu	30	16	9	5	43	22	+21	57	
4	Alexandria	30	15	5	10	55	36	+19	50	
5	Filiași	30	15	4	11	50	47	+3	49	
6	Pucioasa	30	13	6	11	59	40	+19	45	
7	CS U II Craiova	30	11	10	9	50	39	+11	43 (Note: SR Brașov–CS U II Craiova 2–4; CS U II Craiova–SR Brașov 2–0)	
8	SR Brașov	30	12	7	11	48	34	+14	43	
9	Unirea Bascov	30	11	8	11	52	45	+7	41	
10	Voluntari II	30	11	7	12	39	44	−5	40 (Note: 1.Voluntari II 7P. 2.Flacăra Moreni 6P. 3.Astra II 4P. (Table of head-to-head matches))	
11	Flacăra Moreni	30	12	4	14	38	48	−10	40	
12	Astra II (O)	30	11	7	12	47	51	−4	40	Possible relegation to Liga IV
13	Atletic Bradu (R)	30	10	3	17	49	63	−14	33	Relegation to Liga IV
14	Sporting Roșiori (R)	30	7	9	14	36	58	−22	30	Relegation to Liga IV
15	Hermannstadt II (R)	30	5	6	19	35	78	−43	21	Relegation to Liga IV
16	Viitorul Domnești (R)	30	0	3	27	16	129	−113	3	Relegation to Liga IV

Source: FRF (in Romanian), Soccerway
Rules for classification: 1) Points; 2) Head-to-head points; 3) Head-to-head goal difference; 4) Head-to-head goals scored; 5) Head-to-head away goals scored; 6) Goal difference; 7) Goals scored.
(C) Champions; (O) Play-off winners; (P) Promoted; (R) Relegated

=== Seria IV ===
Pos	Team	Pld	W	D	L	GF	GA	GD	Pts	Promotion or relegation
1	CSMȘ Reșița (C, P)	30	19	5	6	60	27	+33	62	Promotion to Liga II
2	Șoimii Lipova	30	18	6	6	70	42	+28	60	
3	Dumbrăvița	30	18	4	8	60	43	+17	58	
4	Gloria Lunca-Teuz Cermei	30	17	2	11	56	48	+8	53 (Note: Metalurgistul Cugir–Gloria Lunca-Teuz Cermei 2–3; Gloria Lunca-Teuz Cermei–Metalurgistul Cugir 1–1)	
5	Metalurgistul Cugir	30	15	8	7	59	46	+13	53	
6	Național Sebiș	30	13	11	6	57	44	+13	50	
7	Crișul Chișineu-Criș	30	13	10	7	55	31	+24	49	
8	Avrig	30	13	4	13	38	43	−5	43	
9	Hunedoara	30	12	6	12	53	51	+2	42	
10	Industria Galda	30	13	2	15	50	43	+7	41	
11	Ghiroda	30	12	3	15	57	52	+5	39	
12	Unirea Alba Iulia (O)	30	9	11	10	37	42	−5	38	Possible relegation to Liga IV
13	Cetate Deva (R)	30	10	5	15	36	49	−13	35	Relegation to Liga IV
14	Millenium Giarmata (R)	30	8	5	17	45	64	−19	29	Relegation to Liga IV
15	Lugoj (R)	30	2	6	22	29	77	−48	12	Relegation to Liga IV
16	Ocna Mureș (R)	30	2	4	24	28	88	−60	10	Relegation to Liga IV

Source: FRF (in Romanian), Soccerway
Rules for classification: 1) Points; 2) Head-to-head points; 3) Head-to-head goal difference; 4) Head-to-head goals scored; 5) Head-to-head away goals scored; 6) Goal difference; 7) Goals scored.
(C) Champions; (O) Play-off winners; (P) Promoted; (R) Relegated

=== Seria V ===
Pos	Team	Pld	W	D	L	GF	GA	GD	Pts	Promotion or relegation
1	Miercurea Ciuc (C, P)	30	22	5	3	80	18	+62	71	Promotion to Liga II
2	Comuna Recea	30	20	3	7	85	34	+51	63	
3	Minaur Baia Mare	30	16	9	5	46	22	+24	57	
4	Olimpic Cetate Râșnov	30	17	4	9	39	30	+9	55	
5	Sănătatea Cluj	30	16	5	9	52	32	+20	53	
6	Avântul Reghin	30	15	7	8	46	31	+15	52	
7	Sticla Arieșul Turda	30	14	8	8	50	35	+15	50	
8	CFR Cluj-Napoca II	30	13	7	10	62	46	+16	46	
9	1. FC Gloria	30	12	7	11	46	44	+2	43	
10	Odorheiu Secuiesc	30	11	5	14	41	40	+1	38	
11	Unirea Dej	30	9	9	12	42	41	+1	36	
12	Hărman (O)	30	9	8	13	42	43	−1	35	Possible relegation to Liga IV
13	Unirea Tășnad (R)	30	8	6	16	47	67	−20	30	Relegation to Liga IV
14	MSE Târgu Mureș (R)	30	6	4	20	26	86	−60	22	Relegation to Liga IV
15	Gaz Metan II Mediaș (R)	30	3	3	24	26	81	−55	12	Relegation to Liga IV
16	Iernut (R)	30	3	2	25	34	114	−80	11	Relegation to Liga IV

Source: FRF (in Romanian), Soccerway
Rules for classification: 1) Points; 2) Head-to-head points; 3) Head-to-head goal difference; 4) Head-to-head goals scored; 5) Head-to-head away goals scored; 6) Goal difference; 7) Goals scored.
(C) Champions; (O) Play-off winners; (P) Promoted; (R) Relegated

== Possible relegation ==
At the end of the season, a special table was made between 12th places from the 5 series. The last team in this table was also relegated in the Liga IV. In this table, 12th place teams are included without the points obtained against teams that relegated in their series.

Pos	Team	Pld	W	D	L	GF	GA	GD	Pts	Relegation
1	Astra II	22	6	4	12	22	41	−19	22	
2	Hărman	22	4	8	10	24	34	−10	20	
3	Unirea Alba Iulia	22	4	8	10	22	37	−15	20	
4	Botoșani II	22	5	3	14	17	41	−24	18	
5	Agricola Borcea (R)	22	5	3	14	33	74	−41	18	Relegation to Liga IV

Source: FRF (in Romanian)
Rules for classification: 1) Points; 2) Goal difference; 3) Goals scored.
(R) Relegated
