= Eduard Liviu Bartales =

Romanian footballer

Personal information
- Full name: Eduard Liviu Bartales
- Date of birth: 15 May 1954
- Place of birth: Bucharest, Romania
- Date of death: 28 November 2013 (aged 59)
- Place of death: Bucharest, Romania
- Position: Forward

Youth career
- Progresul București

Senior career*
Years	Team	Apps	(Gls)
1973–1978	Rapid București (Note: Only statistics for the 1973–74 Divizia A season are available.)	21	(0)
1976–1977	→ Chimia Râmnicu Vâlcea (loan)		
- Gloria Reșița
- FEPA 74 Bârlad
- Chimia Turnu Măgurele
- * Club domestic league appearances and goals

Eduard Liviu Bartales (Italian: Bartelli; 15 May 1954 – 28 November 2013) was a Romanian footballer who played as a forward. (Note: Eduard Liviu Bartales at WorldFootball.net)

His father was an Italian named Nicola Bartelli who settled in Romania, but the Communist authorities made him change his name to Nicolae Bartales, in order to "sound more Romanian". Eduard Liviu Bartales died on 28 November 2013, aged 59, in Bucharest, Romania. His funeral took place on 1 December at the Cimitirul Străuleşti.

== Honours ==
Rapid București

- Divizia B: 1974–75
- Cupa României: 1974–75
