= CSM Alexandria =

Romanian football club

- Full name: Club Sportiv Municipal Alexandria
- Nicknames: Alexăndrenii (The Alexandria People); Teleormănenii (The Teleorman People); Rulmentul (The Bearing)
- Short name: Alexandria
- Founded: 1948; 78 years ago as Unirea Alexandria
- Ground: Comunal (Buzescu) (temporary)
- Capacity: 500
- Owner: Alexandria Municipality
- Chairman: Bogdan Ciobanu
- Manager: Sorin Albeanu
- League: Liga III
- 2025–26: Liga III, Seria V, 6th
- Website: https://csmalexandria.ro/
Home colours	Away colours

Club Sportiv Municipal Alexandria, commonly known as CSM Alexandria or simply as Alexandria, is a Romanian professional football club based in Alexandria, Teleorman County, currently competes in Liga III, the third tier of Romanian football.

The men’s football team of CSM Alexandria, part of the multi-sport club that also includes a women's football team and a women's basketball team, was founded in 1948 and has gone through several names over time, including Unirea, Progresul, Comerțul, Automatica, Rulmentul, FC Alexandria, and FCM Alexandria, and it is considered one of the most important football clubs in Teleorman County, having spent seventeen seasons in the Romanian second division between 1962 and 2024. Its best performance came in the 1981–82 season, when it ranked 3rd in Series II of Divizia B.

The team’s most notable players include Florea Voicilă, who represented the Romanian national team while playing in the second division for Alexandria, and Florică Mitroi. It also developed players such as Dan Balauru, Valentin Badea, and Basarab Panduru, who went on to play at the highest level, with Panduru even representing Romania internationally.

== History ==
The team was founded in 1948 under the name Unirea Alexandria and played in the Bucharest Regional Championship. The team was renamed Progresul Alexandria in the summer of 1961 and promoted to Divizia B at the end of the 1961–62 season winning the Regional Championship and the Series II of the promotion play-off held at Piatra Neamț.

Progresul lasted only one season in the second division, finishing in 12th place and being relegated to the newly formed Divizia C. The team played the following two seasons in the South Series of the third division, finishing 11th in the 1963–64 season and 14th in the 1964–65 season, which led to their relegation to the regional championship.

Renamed Comerțul Alexandria, the team returned to Divizia C after three seasons in the regional championship, finishing 1st in the West Series of the 1967–68 season.

In the following seasons, Comerțul played in Series IV of the third division, finishing 3rd in the 1968–69 season, 2nd in the 1969–70 season, just four points behind Autobuzul București, 6th in the 1970–71 season, and 8th in Series VI in the 1971–72 season. The team was then renamed Automatica, being taken over by the Întreprinderea de Panouri și Tablouri Electrice (lit. 'Electrical Panels and Switchboards Enterprise'), and continued to compete in Series VI of Divizia C, finishing 4th in the 1972–73 season and 1st in the 1973–74 season, which earned them promotion to the second division after eleven years of absence.

In the 1974–75 season, Automatica, coached by former Romanian national football team player Cornel Popa, finished 14th in Series II, tied on points with Flacăra Moreni. The team remained in the second division after winning the relegation tie-breaker match 1–0 held in Oradea, with a goal scored by Florea Voicilă.

The team started the 1975–76 campaign with former Rapid București player Viorel Kraus as head coach, but he left during the winter break for a board official position at Sportul Studențesc. Renamed Unirea Alexandria mid-season, the team finished in 12th place in Series II, with Constantin Marinescu as head coach in the second part of the season.

In the following two seasons, the team finished 4th in 1976–77 under coach I. Ceavdaridis in the first part of the season and Gheorghe Dungu in the second. Dungu was replaced by Virgil Blujdea in January 1978, who led the team to a 9th-place finish in the 1977–78 season.

In 1978, Întreprinderea Rulmentul (lit. 'Bearing Enterprise') took over the team, renaming it Rulmentul Alexandria. Under the leadership of Petre Gavrilă, the team finished 4th in 1978–79, 5th in 1979–80, and barely avoided relegation in 1980–81, finishing 13th, just one point above the relegation line.

"We haven't forgotten that in '82/ You took us through Paradise/ After Rapid, you were also/ In 3rd place, and it wasn't a dream"

— quatrain of the late Dr. Jean Sardu.

In the 1981–82 season, Rulmentul ranked 3rd in the Series II of Divizia B, behind promoted Petrolul Ploiești and Rapid București. It was the peak moment of Teleorman football until then, the team being coached by former international Nicolae Lupescu. Florea Voicilă shone in the team, a striker with exceptional qualities, who managed the performance of catching two selections for the national team even though he was part of a second division team.

Alexăndrenii finished 6th in the 1982–83 season, 11th in 1983–84, and 16th in 1984–85, resulting in relegation to the third division after eleven consecutive years in Divizia B. After relegation, the team was renamed Automatica, with the Electrical Panels and Switchboards Enterprise providing financial support once again, and went on to finish as runners-up in Series VI in the 1985–86 and 1987–88 seasons, and 3rd in 1986–87.

Returned to the second tier, Rulmentul ranked 15th in Series I of the 2002–03 season but was spared from relegation due to Bucovina Suceava's exclusion. The following year, the team finished 11th in Series II under player-coach Viorel Ion. In the 2004–05 season, Rulmentul was relegated to the third division after finishing last in Series II, and dropped further to the fourth division at the end of the next season, once again finishing bottom of its series.

Chronology of names
Name	Period
Unirea Alexandria	1948–1961
Progresul Alexandria	1961–1967
Comerțul Alexandria	1967–1972
Automatica Alexandria	1972–1976
Unirea Alexandria	1976–1978
Rulmentul Alexandria	1978–1981
Unirea Alexandria	1981–1985
Automatica Alexandria	1985–1988
Unirea Alexandria	1988–1990
Rulmentul Alexandria	1990–1991
Unirea Alexandria	1991–1996
FC Alexandria	1996–1997
Rulmentul Alexandria	1997–2008
FCM Alexandria	2008–2018
CSM Alexandria	2018–present

In the 2008–09 season, Alexandria won Liga IV – Teleorman County but lost the promotion play-off for Liga III, 1–2 against Comprest București. In spite of the defeat, the club managed to promote by administrative decision; the Romanian Football Federation announced that FCM Alexandria would play in Series IV of the 2009–10 Liga III season, where it finished mid-table in 8th place, with Romulus Ciobanu taking charge in the second half of the campaign.

In the following three seasons, Alexandria competed in Series III. Ciobanu left the team after five rounds in 2010–11 and was replaced by Alexandru Gheorghe, who led the team to a 14th-place finish out of 16, avoiding relegation due to the withdrawal of other teams, and a 9th-place finish in 2011–12. The 2012–13 season ended in 11th place under the guidance of three coaches during the campaign, Alexandru Gheorghe, Marian Botea, and Sorin Albeanu, which resulted in relegation to the fourth division.

Following the relegation, Mircea Cristescu was appointed head coach and guided the team to a 2nd-place finish in the 2013–14 season of Liga IV – Teleorman County, ten points behind Sporting Roșiori.

The failure to achieve promotion led to Cristescu’s dismissal, with Gabriel Lungu taking over for the 2014–15 season. However, Lungu was sacked after a 0–1 defeat in the 8th round against Sporting Turnu Măgurele, the main contender for promotion, and Romulus Ciobanu was appointed head coach. Under Ciobanu, the Alexăndrenii finished as runners-up, eight points behind their rivals from Turnu Măgurele.

With Ciobanu in charge, FCM Alexandria returned to the third tier by winning the 2015–16 Liga IV –Teleorman County season and the promotion play-off against Andrias Andrășești (3–1 at home and 1–1 away), champions of Liga IV – Ialomița County. The squad included, among others, Fl. Olteanu, Penescu, Al. Olteanu, Bârsănel, Pârjolea, Fl. Radu, Preda, Dragu, Brânceanu, Ov. Gheorghe, Sitaru, Căpățână, Desculțu, Mândru, and Barbălată.

In Liga III, Alexandria competed in Series III in the 2016–17 season, finishing in 3rd place. Ciobanu left in November 2017 for the main promotion rival Petrolul Ploiești and was replaced by Marius Stoica. In April 2018, after a 1–4 defeat against their rival, Stoica was dismissed and replaced by Marian Botea, who led the team to finish as runners-up, four points behind them. The squad included among others Olteanu, Sîrbu, Floricel, Ciocoteală, Barbălată, Vîlcică, Boșoteanu, Desculțu, Fl. Radu, Căpățînă, Calofir, Vîrtej, Călin, Terci and Mitran.

In 2018, Fotbal Club Municipal Alexandria was integrated into the multi-sport structure and changed its name to Club Sportiv Municipal Alexandria. The team began the 2018–19 campaign with Alin Chița as head coach, but he was dismissed in October 2018. Sorin Albeanu took over on an interim basis until March 2019, when Alin Pânzaru was appointed, and the team ended the season in 4th place in Series II. Under Pânzaru, Alexandria finished 4th in Series III in 2019–20, a season interrupted in March 2020 due to the COVID-19 pandemic. Laurențiu Diniță was named head coach for the 2020–21 season, but in November he was replaced by Sorin Albeanu, who guided the team to a 5th-place finish in Series VI.

The 2021–22 campaign began under Mugurel Cornățeanu, but he was replaced after five rounds due to poor results by Sorin Albeanu, who remained in charge until the winter break. Cristian Dănălache then took over in January 2022 and led the team to finish 3rd in both the regular season and the play-off round of Series VI.

Ștefan Odoarabă was appointed head coach for the 2022–23 season and guided Alexandria to finish 1st in both the regular season and the play-off round of Series VI, qualifying for the promotion play-offs where it defeated CSO Plopeni 2–0 on aggregate and Viitorul Dăești 6–1 on aggregate over two legs, thus securing a return to the second league after an eighteen-year absence. Alexandria also reached the group stage of Cupa României, where it finished last in Group C after a 0–4 defeat against Universitatea Cluj, a 2–2 draw with Farul Constanța, and a 0–4 loss to Dumbrăvița. The squad included Cristică, Dohotariu, Nicola, Defta, Ed. Sîrbu, Vl. Georgescu, Vlad, Teodorescu, Ciocoteală, Lupoaică, I. Voicu, M. Stancu, Chiriceanu, Iakabfi, L. Ana, Dobrică, Jerdea, C. Neagu, Cioablă, Lătărețu, and Sultana.

In the 2023–24 Liga II season, Ștefan Odoarabă was dismissed after seven rounds, under his tenure Alexandria qualified for the Cupa României group stage. He was replaced by Alin Pânzaru, who remained in charge until the 15th round. In the Cupa României, Alexandria competed in Group B, recording a 1–3 defeat against CFR Cluj, a 2–1 win over Botoșani, and a 1–3 loss to Steaua București, finishing 5th and being eliminated. In December, Eugen Trică took over the team, leading it to a 19th-place finish in the regular season but leaving after the first play-out match, with Sorin Albeanu managing the team until the end of the campaign, as Alexandria finished last in Group B of the play-out round and was relegated.

== Honours ==
Liga III

- Winners (4): 1973–74, 1997–98, 2001–02, 2022–23
- Runners-up (6): 1969–70, 1985–86, 1987–88, 1988–89, 1990–91, 2017–18

Liga IV – Teleorman County

- Winners (3): 1996–97, 2008–09, 2015–16
- Runners-up (2): 2013–14, 2014–15

Bucharest Regional Championship:

- Winners (2): 1961–62, 1967–68

== Players ==
=== First team squad ===
As of 10 September 2024

Note: Flags indicate national team as defined under FIFA eligibility rules; some limited exceptions apply. Players may hold more than one non-FIFA nationality.

No.	Pos.	Nation	Player
1	GK	ROU	Mario Alexe
2	DF	ROU	Marius Radu
3	DF	ROU	Robert Barfă
5	DF	ROU	Vladimir Georgescu (Vice-Captain)
6	MF	ROU	David Stăiculescu
7	MF	ROU	Nicușor Brîncoveanu (on loan from Buzău)
8	MF	ROU	Alexandru Ciocan
10	MF	ROU	Mario Răducan
11	FW	ROU	Denis Golda
12	GK	ROU	Iosif Cristică (Captain)

No.	Pos.	Nation	Player
14	MF	ROU	Andi Neaga (on loan from Rapid)
15	DF	ROU	Andrei Bobaru
17	MF	ROU	Vlad Danale
18	MF	ROU	Sabin Iakabfi
22	MF	ROU	Claudiu Bumbănac (on loan from FCSB)
23	MF	ROU	Vasile Constantin
25	DF	ROU	Petruș Pintilie
26	MF	ROU	Alexandru Crivac
32	GK	ROU	Iannis Pletea (on loan from CSA Steaua)
33	DF	ROU	Marius Ciobanu

=== Out on loan ===
Note: Flags indicate national team as defined under FIFA eligibility rules; some limited exceptions apply. Players may hold more than one non-FIFA nationality.

No. / Pos. / Nation / Player	No. / Pos. / Nation / Player

== Club officials ==
=== Board of directors ===
Role	Name
Owner	(Romania) Alexandria Municipality
President	(Romania) Șerban Slăbescu
Executive President	(Romania) Bogdan Ciobanu
Sporting director	(Romania) Constantin Miruță
Technical director	(Romania) Marin Mitran

=== Current technical staff ===
Role	Name
Manager	(Romania) Sorin Albeanu
Assistant coach	(Romania) Cristian Pîrjolea
Goalkeeping coach	(Romania) Marian Ioana

== Notable former players ==
Romania

- (Romania) Eugen Anghel
- (Romania) Valentin Badea
- (Romania) Dan Balauru
- (Romania) Valentin Bădoi
- (Romania) Cosmin Ciocoteală
- (Romania) Gigel Ene
- (Romania) Viorel Ion
- (Romania) Gheorghe Mihăiță
- (Romania) Cosmin Neagu
- (Romania) Florin Olteanu
- (Romania) Constantin Pană
- (Romania) Ilie Radu
- (Romania) Constantin Stănici
- (Romania) Bogdan Vișan
- (Romania) Dănuț Voicilă
- (Romania) Florea Voicilă
- (Romania) Ionuț Voicu

== Former managers ==
- (Romania) Gheorghe Dungu (1963–1964)
- (Romania) Cornel Popa (1974–1975)
- (Romania) Viorel Kraus (1975)
- (Romania) Constantin Marinescu (1976)
- (Romania) I. Ceavdaridis (1976)
- (Romania) Gheorghe Dungu (1976–1977)
- (Romania) Virgil Blujdea (1978)
- (Romania) Petre Gavrilă (1978–1981)
- (Romania) Viorel Ion (2003–2004)
- (Romania) Romulus Ciobanu (2008–2009)
- (Romania) Emil Ursu (2011)
- (Romania) Romulus Ciobanu (2014–2017)
- (Romania) Alin Chița (2018)
- (Romania) Alin Pânzaru (2019)
- (Romania) Laurențiu Diniță (2020)
- (Romania) Eugen Trică (2023–2024)
- (Romania) Nicolae Lupescu
- (Romania) Gabriel Raksi
- (Romania) Florea Voicilă

== League and Cup history ==
Season	Tier	Division	Place	Notes	Cupa României
2025–26	3	Liga III (Seria V)	TBD		First Round
2024–25	3	Liga III (Seria IV)	4th		Play-off Round
2023–24	2	Liga II	19th	Relegated	Group Stage
2022–23	3	Liga III (Seria VI)	1st (C)	Promoted	Group Stage
2021–22	3	Liga III (Seria VI)	3rd		Second Round
2020–21	3	Liga III (Seria VI)	5th		Third Round
2019–20	3	Liga III (Seria III)	4th		Third Round
2018–19	3	Liga III (Seria II)	4th		Third Round
2017–18	3	Liga III (Seria III)	2nd		Fourth Round
2016–17	3	Liga III (Seria III)	3rd		
2015–16	4	Liga IV (TR)	1st (C)	Promoted	
2014–15	4	Liga IV (TR)	2nd		
2013–14	4	Liga IV (TR)	2nd		
2012–13	3	Liga III (Seria III)	11th	Relegated	
2011–12	3	Liga III (Seria III)	9th		
2010–11	3	Liga III (Seria III)	14th		
2009–10	3	Liga III (Seria IV)	8th		

Season	Tier	Division	Place	Notes	Cupa României
2008–09	4	Liga IV (TR)	1st (C)	Promoted	
2005–06	3	Divizia C (Seria IV)	14th	Relegated	
2004–05	2	Divizia B (Seria II)	16th	Relegated	
2003–04	2	Divizia B (Seria II)	11th		
2002–03	2	Divizia B (Seria I)	15th		
2001–02	3	Divizia C (Seria IV)	1st (C)	Promoted	
2000–01	3	Divizia C (Seria IV)	5th		
1999–00	3	Divizia C (Seria III)	14th		
1998–99	2	Divizia B (Seria I)	16th	Relegated	
1997–98	3	Divizia C (Seria III)	1st (C)	Promoted	
1996–97	3	Divizia C (Seria III)	17th		
1995–96	3	Divizia C (Seria III)	20th		
1994–95	3	Divizia C (Seria III)	7th		
1993–94	3	Divizia C (Seria III)	14th		
1992–93	3	Divizia C (Seria III)	16th		
1991–92	3	Divizia C (Seria VII)	4th		
1990–91	3	Divizia C (Seria VII)	2nd		
1989–90	3	Divizia C (Seria VI)	4th		
