= Cosmin Ciocoteală =

Romanian footballer

Personal information
- Full name: Cosmin Marian Ciocoteală
- Date of birth: 21 July 1997 (age 29)
- Place of birth: Drobeta-Turnu Severin, Romania
- Height: 1.80 m (5 ft 11 in)
- Position: Midfielder

Youth career
- –2012: CSS Turnu Severin
- 2012–2014: ȘF "Gică Popescu"
- 2014–2015: Universitatea Craiova

Senior career*
Years	Team	Apps	(Gls)
2015	Universitatea Craiova	1	(0)
2016	Universitatea II Craiova	7	(0)
2017–2022	Alexandria	104	(6)
2023	Steaua București	5	(0)
2023–2024	Cetatea Turnu Măgurele	14	(2)
- * Club domestic league appearances and goals as of 16:18, 16 January 2024 (UTC)

Cosmin Marian Ciocoteală (born 21 July 1997) is a Romanian professional footballer who plays as a midfielder for Cetatea Turnu Măgurele. In his career, Ciocoteală also played for CS Universitatea Craiova, CSM Alexandria or CSA Steaua București.
