= AFC Turris-Oltul Turnu Măgurele =

Romanian football club

Turris Turnu Măgurele
- Full name: Fotbal Club Turris-Oltul; Turnu Măgurele
- Nickname(s): Turnenii (The People from Turnu Măgurele)
- Short name: Turris
- Founded: 1965 (as Voința Saelele)
- Dissolved: 2021
- Ground: Municipal
- Capacity: 2,000
Home colours	Away colours

AFC Turris-Oltul Turnu Măgurele, commonly known as Turris Turnu Măgurele, or simply Turris, was a Romanian professional football club based in Turnu Măgurele, Teleorman County.

The team was founded as Voința Saelele in 1965 and was originally based in Saelele, Teleorman County. The club played only at amateur level, Liga IV and Liga V, until 2017 when it won Liga IV – Teleorman County and the promotion play-off against CS Strehaia ensuring its first Liga III presence. In the summer of the same year the club was moved from Saelele to Turnu Măgurele and changed its name in Voința Turnu Măgurele, then in the summer of 2018 in Turris-Oltul Turnu Măgurele. The club was dissolved in January 2021.

== History ==
AFC Turris-Oltul Turnu Măgurele was founded in 1965 as Voința Saelele and played for almost all its history at county level, Liga IV and Liga V. Voința won for the first time Divizia D at the end of the 2003–04 season, but withdrew from the third tier before the start of the new campaign, selling its place to Petrolul Videle. At the end of 2016–17 Liga IV season, the team was crowned the champion of Teleorman County and went to the promotion play-off match where they defeated Mehedinți County champions, CS Strehaia, 12–2 on aggregate and promoted to Liga III for the first time in the history of the club.

In the summer of 2017 Voința changed its ownership and moved its headquarters from Saelele to Turnu Măgurele, also changing its name from Voința Saelele to Voința Turnu Măgurele. After a strong campaign of transfers and rebranding, Voința has set as its goal a promotion to Liga II, but finally was ranked only 3rd, after Petrolul Ploiești and FCM Alexandria. In the summer of 2018 the club moved also its home ground to Turnu Măgurele and was renamed again, this time as Turris-Oltul Turnu Măgurele, a name much closer to the football past of the city, this being actually the first name used by the old football club, Dunărea Turris Turnu Măgurele.

Turris-Oltul was the third football team in the history of Turnu Măgurele, after Dunărea Turris and Sporting.

At the end of the 2018–19 season, Turris-Oltul Turnu Măgurele promoted to Liga II for the first time in its history, after winning the third series of the Liga III, being ranked ahead teams such as FC U Craiova, CSM Alexandria or SR Brașov.

Turris-Oltul Turnu Măgurele was dissolved in January 2021, after owner Valentin Dragnea, son of former President of the Chamber of Deputies of Romania, Liviu Dragnea, stopped his financing of the club.

== Grounds ==
=== Stadionul Comunal ===
Between 1965 and 2018, when the club was known as Voința Saelele or Voința Turnu Măgurele, played its home matches on Comunal Stadium, from Saelele, Teleorman County with a capacity of 1,000.

=== Stadionul Municipal ===
From 2018 Turris-Oltul played its home matches on Municipal Stadium, with a capacity of 2,000 people. Between 2017 and 2018 the stadium was completely renovated with an investment of €3 million.

== Chronology of names ==
Name	Period
Voința Saelele	1965–2017
Voința Turnu Măgurele	2017–2018
Turris-Oltul Turnu Măgurele	2018–2021

== Honours ==
- Liga III:
  - Winners (1): 2018–19
- Liga IV – Teleorman County
  - Winners (2): 2003–04, 2016–17
  - Runners-up (1): 2008–09
- Cupa României – Teleorman County
  - Runners-up (1): 2016–17

== League history ==
Season	Tier	Division	Place	Cupa României
2020–21	2	Liga II	21st (R)	Round of 16
2019–20	2	Liga II	4th	Round of 32
2018–19	3	Liga III (Seria III)	1st (C, P)	Round of 16
2017–18	3	Liga III (Seria III)	3rd	
2016–17	4	Liga IV (TR)	1st (C, P)	
2015–16	4	Liga IV (TR)	8th	

Season	Tier	Division	Place	Cupa României
2014–15	4	Liga IV (TR)	4th	
2013–14	4	Liga IV (TR)	7th	
2012–13	4	Liga IV (TR)	10th	
2011–12	4	Liga IV (TR)	4th	
2010–11	4	Liga IV (TR)	3rd	
2009–10	4	Liga IV (TR)	8th	
