= ACS Sporting Turnu Măgurele =

Sporting Turnu Măgurele
- Full name: ACS Sporting Turnu Măgurele
- Nicknames: Galben-Verzii (The Yellow and Greens)
- Founded: 2014
- Dissolved: 2016
- Ground: Municipal
- Capacity: 3,000
Home colours	Away colours

ACS Sporting Turnu Măgurele was a Romanian football club based in Turnu Măgurele, Teleorman County.

== History ==
Sporting was founded in the summer of 2014, by Italian businessman Valter Raffini, the owner of Eurosiloz Company, to continue the football legacy of Turnu Măgurele, after the bankruptcy of Dunărea Turris Turnu Măgurele in 2013.

In the summer of 2016 the club withdrew from Liga III and then was dissolved.

== Honours ==
Liga IV – Teleorman County

- Winners (1): 2014–15

== Former managers ==
- (Romania) Valentin Bădoi (2014–2016)
- (Romania) Adrian Iencsi (2016)
