= CSM Cetatea Turnu Măgurele =

Romanian association football club

Cetatea Turnu Măgurele
- Full name: Clubul Sportiv Municipal Cetatea Turnu Măgurele
- Nicknames: Leuții; Turnenii (People of Turnu Măgurele); Teleormănenii (People of Teleorman County); Dunărenii (Danube People); Chimiștii (The Chemists)
- Short name: Cetatea
- Founded: 1962; 64 years ago as Chimia Turnu Măgurele; 2021; 5 years ago (refounded) as Dunărea Turris Turnu Măguele
- Ground: Municipal
- Capacity: 2,000
- Owner: Turnu Măgurele Municipality
- Chairman: Ionuț Babadac
- Manager: Rodin Voinea
- League: Liga III
- 2025–26: Liga III, Seria III, 4th
| Home colours | Away colours |

Clubul Sportiv Municipal Cetatea Turnu Măgurele, commonly known as Cetatea Turnu Măgurele, or simply Cetatea, is a Romanian football club based in Turnu Măgurele, Teleorman County, founded in 1962 and refounded in 2021.

The team was established in 1962 under the name of Chimia Turnu Măgurele and until 1990 was financially sustained by the local chemical plant. After the Romanian Revolution, the club was in an almost constant battle for surviving, changing its name, as well as the ownership for a few times.

After 20 years of struggling, in which the club was balancing between the third tier (Liga III) and fourth tier (Liga IV), in 2010 it entered on a "sloppy road", with finances cut several times and last moment avoidance from bankruptcy. Finally, the club was dissolved in 2013, when its owners, Mihai Ionescu and Municipality of Turnu Măgurele refused to continue the financing. Since then, the football legacy of Turnu Măgurele was continued initially by Sporting Turnu Măgurele, then by Turris-Oltul Turnu Măgurele, both private entities. The "new Turris" achieved again the second tier in 2019, first presence of the town at that level since 1984, when Chimia represented the town near the Danube.

In the summer of 2021, after the dissolution of Turris-Oltul Turnu Măgurele, the Municipality of Turnu Măgurele revived the old club, CS Dunărea Turris Turnu Măgurele and enrolled the team in the Liga IV.

== History ==
=== First years and ascension (1962–1992) ===
After times in which many teams were established in the town of Turnu Măgurele (notable among them Oltul Turnu Măgurele and Dinamo Turnu Măgurele), in 1962, it was decided to found a main team, moment when Chimia Turnu Măgurele was founded (football club that was established in partnership with the town's chemical plant, according to the communist habit of linking the teams with the most important industries in the local area).

After a few years in the Regional Championship, at the end of the 1966–67 season, the first promotion to Divizia C was achieved. In the first season, Chimia was ranked 6th, then 9th (1968–69) and again 6th at the end of the 1969–70 edition. In 1970, Chimia started to climb to the top positions of the league table, 3rd (1970–71 and 1971–72), then 5th (1972–73) and finally ended as runners-up at the end of the 1973–74 season. After that second place, the management understood that Chimia was ready to promote from this division, and therefore, after setting up a good squad in the 1974–75 season, the first promotion to Divizia B was obtained, a historical promotion that was celebrated by the entire town. The squad that achieved the promotion in 1975 was managed by Gheorghe Fusulan and composed of the following players: Cojoacă, Zîmbrea, Zavera, Șcheau, Dragole, Pîrvu, Stoichiță, Domnișoru, Solomon, Meiroșu, Sardu, Radu, Rusu, Ceangîru, Roatămoale, Ciotec, Dumitru Chioțea, Cărbunaru, Popa, Dobre and Penuș.

The first season in the Divizia B (1976–77), ended with a 9th place, followed by a 12th place in the next season, then a 10th place (1977–78) and a 14th place (1978–79), with a dramatic avoidance of relegation at that time. This last-round surviving was in fact the sign that the squad was not on a good road and the relegation came next season (1979–80), when Chimia was ranked only 17th.

Back in the Divizia C, turnenii were decided to came back in the second tier as fast as possible and after three seasons they achieved a new promotion in the Divizia B. 1983 squad of Chimia was managed by Gheorghe Costinescu and included the following footballers: Zariosu, Titirică, Ștefan, Potîng, Doncea, Văduva, Cristea, Bogheci, Bădăluță, Vlădescu, Bastardu, Zaharia, Iliescu, B. Nica, Ionescu, I. Nica, Huțan, Neațu, Dimirache, Chivu, Cîrjan, Ceatean, Bartales, C. Zamfir, Cochiță, Dumitrache and Cărbunaru. After only one season in the antechamber of the Romanian top-fligh, the team near the Danube relegated again, this time as the weakest team, occupying the last place.

After relegation, Chimia Turnu Măgurele played constantly at the level of the third tier and was ranked 8th (1984–85), 4th (1985–86, 1986–87 and 1990–91) 5th (1987–88), 14th (1988–89), 11th (1989–90) and 12th (1991–92). After this last ranking, the team based in Turnu Măgurele was relegated to Divizia D, for the first time in the last 25 years.

=== The struggle (1992–2010) ===
During the 1990s, Chimia played mostly at the level of the fourth tier, also changing its name from Chimia Turnu Măgurele to Electro-Turris Turnu Măgurele. At the end of the 1997–98 season, teleormănenii achieved a new promotion to Divizia C, after they were crowned as champions of Teleorman County and subsequently won a promotion play-off.

After three seasons with no notable results and a new name changing, this time from Electro-Turris Turnu Măgurele to Turris Turnu Măgurele, the team relegated again in the County Leagues (4th tier). In the Divizia D, Turris spent only one season as it became the county champion and then won the promotion play-off to Divizia C. This team is also remembered as the "record team" since in addition to the title of county champion and the title of promoted team, after the promotion play-offs, it also collected the victory in the preliminary round (County Round) of the Romanian Cup.

In the next four seasons spent at the level of the third tier, in which the team obtained following rankings: 12th (2002–03), 4th (2003–04), 9th (2004–05) and 13th (2005–06), it relegated again. After one season in the Liga IV, Turris promoted again, but relegated after only one season, confirming its status of the last 20 years, as a team on the border between third and fourth tier.

In the next two seasons of Liga IV, the team added to its name, the denomination Dunărea (Danube in Romanian), but after a very weak 2008–09 season, in which the club from Southern Romania was ranked 12th, it won again the fourth division, after a difficult battle against Metalul Peretu. After winning the county stage, Turris won the promotion play-off to Liga III against the winner of the Dolj County League, CS Sopot, score 2–1, then promoting for another time in the third division. The promotion party, however, was initially ruined by CS Sopot's appeal for an alleged irregularity of membership of a Turris player, an appeal initially accepted, but then rejected by the disciplinary commission of the FRF which confirmed the promotion to Liga III of Turris.

=== The last years and the carousel of financing (2010–2013) ===
For Dunărea Turris, the summer of 2010 was a "very hot one" as the old investors were unable to find more funds to support the team that was risking the bankruptcy. When everything seemed lost, however, Mihai Ionescu, a businessman from Turnu Măgurele, bought the club and signed new players, as well as a new manager, in the person of Daniel Sava.

On 14 September 2010, Mihai Ionescu fired Daniel Sava after only one point in three games and replaced him with Dumitru Bolborea. With this change in the technical staff, the team managed to get out from the bottom of the table and finished the championship on the 11th place.

The second season in the Liga III, under the ownership of Ionescu, began with the official goal of finishing on the promotion spot and in the first five rounds of the championship the team managed to stay in the lead, followed by CS Buftea and Conpet Ploiești. Before the winter break the situation changed dramatically bad in the relationship between Ionescu and the mayor of the town and during the second part of the season Dunărea went down to the middle of the table. Subsequently, Mihai Ionescu announced the withdrawal of the team from the Liga III. The 2012–13 season was the last one for Dunărea Turris Turnu Măgurele, abandoned by local authorities and its investors, the club was disbanded after a disastrous season.

=== A fresh new start (2021–present) ===
In the summer of 2021, after the dissolution of Turris-Oltul Turnu Măgurele, the Municipality of Turnu Măgurele revived the old club, CS Dunărea Turris Turnu Măgurele and enrolled the team in the Liga IV.

Costin Lazăr, former player of Sportul Studențesc, Rapid București or PAOK, among others, was appointed as head coach for 2021–22 season and Dunărea won the Liga IV Teleorman County qualifying for promotion play-off in Liga III.

In the summer of 2022, along with the promotion in the third tier of Romanian football system, the team coached by Costin Lazăr formalized the change of name to CSM Cetatea Turnu Magurele.

== Honours ==
=== Leagues ===
Liga III

- Winners (2): 1974–75, 1982–83
- Runners-up (1): 1973–74

Liga IV – Teleorman County

- Winners (5): 1997–98, 2001–02, 2006–07, 2009–10, 2021–22

=== Cups ===
Cupa României – Regional Phase (South-West)

- Winners (1): 2022–23

== Players ==
=== First team squad ===
As of 10 September 2024

Note: Flags indicate national team as defined under FIFA eligibility rules; some limited exceptions apply. Players may hold more than one non-FIFA nationality.

| No. | Pos. | Nation | Player |
|---|---|---|---|
| 1 | GK | ROU | Darius Văduva |
| 2 | DF | ROU | Mario Sîrbu |
| 3 | DF | SEN | Jean Mendy (on loan from CSU Craiova) |
| 4 | DF | ROU | Cristian Niță |
| 5 | MF | ROU | Mihai Manole (Vice-Captain) |
| 6 | MF | ROU | Bogdan Călin |
| 7 | FW | ROU | Ianis Nițu |
| 8 | MF | NGA | Oscar Ezejiofor |
| 9 | FW | ROU | Dragoș Popa |
| 10 | MF | ROU | George Tudoran |
| 11 | MF | ROU | Daniel Dumitrescu |

| No. | Pos. | Nation | Player |
|---|---|---|---|
| 12 | GK | ROU | Matei Vancea |
| 14 | FW | ROU | Alexandru Bădulescu |
| 16 | MF | ROU | Vlad Marica |
| 18 | MF | ROU | Eduard Stoica |
| 19 | FW | ROU | Eduard Constantin |
| 21 | MF | ROU | Ionuț Bînță |
| 22 | MF | NGA | Sunday Adejo |
| 25 | DF | ROU | Cătălin Defta |
| 30 | DF | ROU | Camal Moumbagna |
| 81 | GK | ROU | Florin Olteanu (Captain) |

=== Out on loan ===
Note: Flags indicate national team as defined under FIFA eligibility rules; some limited exceptions apply. Players may hold more than one non-FIFA nationality.

| No. / Pos. / Nation / Player | No. / Pos. / Nation / Player |

== Club officials ==
=== Board of directors ===
| Role | Name |
|---|---|
| Owner | (Romania) Turnu Măgurele Municipality |
| President | (Romania) Ionuț Babadac |

=== Current technical staff ===
| Role | Name |
|---|---|
| Manager | (Romania) Rodin Voinea |
| Assistant coach | (Romania) Adrian Chiriță |
| Goalkeeping coach | (Romania) Florin Olteanu |

== League history ==
| Season | Tier | Division | Place | Notes | Cupa României |
|---|---|---|---|---|---|
| 2025–26 | 3 | Liga III (Seria V) | TBD | | |
| 2024–25 | 3 | Liga III (Seria IV) | 7th | | |
| 2023–24 | 3 | Liga III (Seria VI) | 3rd | | |
| 2022–23 | 3 | Liga III (Seria VI) | 5th | | |
| 2021–22 | 4 | Liga IV (TR) | 1st (C) | Promoted | |
| 2013–21 | Not active | | | | |
| 2012–13 | 4 | Liga IV (TR) | 14th | Relegated | |
| 2011–12 | 3 | Liga III (Seria III) | 12th | Relegated | |
| 2010–11 | 3 | Liga III (Seria IV) | 11th | | |
| 2009–10 | 4 | Liga IV (TR) | 1st (C) | Promoted | |
| 2008–09 | 4 | Liga IV (TR) | 12th | | |
| 2007–08 | 3 | Liga III (Seria IV) | 16th | Relegated | |
| 2006–07 | 4 | Liga IV (TR) | 1st (C) | Promoted | |
| 2005–06 | 3 | Divizia C (Seria IV) | 13th | Relegated | |
| 2004–05 | 3 | Divizia C (Seria III) | 9th | | |
| 2003–04 | 3 | Divizia C (Seria V) | 4th | | |
| 2002–03 | 3 | Divizia C (Seria IV) | 12th | | |
| 2001–02 | 4 | Divizia D (TR) | 1st (C) | Promoted | |
| 2000–01 | 3 | Divizia C (Seria IV) | 14th | Relegated | |
| 1999–00 | 3 | Divizia C (Seria III) | 6th | | |
| 1998–99 | 3 | Divizia C (Seria II) | 9th | | |
| 1997–98 | 4 | Divizia D (TR) | 1st (C) | Promoted | |
| 1991–92 | 3 | Divizia C (Seria VII) | 12th | Relegated | |

| Season | Tier | Division | Place | Notes | Cupa României |
|---|---|---|---|---|---|
| 1990–91 | 3 | Divizia C (Seria VII) | 4th | | |
| 1989–90 | 3 | Divizia C (Seria VI) | 11th | | |
| 1988–89 | 3 | Divizia C (Seria V) | 14th | | |
| 1987–88 | 3 | Divizia C (Seria VI) | 5th | | |
| 1986–87 | 3 | Divizia C (Seria VI) | 4th | | |
| 1985–86 | 3 | Divizia C (Seria VI) | 4th | | |
| 1984–85 | 3 | Divizia C (Seria VI) | 8th | | |
| 1983–84 | 2 | Divizia B (Seria II) | 18th | Relegated | |
| 1982–83 | 3 | Divizia C (Seria VI) | 1st (C) | Promoted | |
| 1981–82 | 3 | Divizia C (Seria VI) | 3rd | | |
| 1980–81 | 3 | Divizia C (Seria V) | 3rd | | |
| 1979–80 | 2 | Divizia B (Seria II) | 17th | Relegated | |
| 1978–79 | 2 | Divizia B (Seria II) | 14th | | |
| 1977–78 | 2 | Divizia B (Seria II) | 10th | | |
| 1976–77 | 2 | Divizia B (Seria II) | 12th | | |
| 1975–76 | 2 | Divizia B (Seria II) | 10th | | |
| 1974–75 | 3 | Divizia C (Seria VI) | 1st (C) | Promoted | |
| 1973–74 | 3 | Divizia C (Seria VI) | 2nd | | |
| 1972–73 | 3 | Divizia C (Seria VI) | 5th | | |
| 1971–72 | 3 | Divizia C (Seria VI) | 3rd | | |
| 1970–71 | 3 | Divizia C (Seria IV) | 3rd | | |
| 1969–70 | 3 | Divizia C (Seria IV) | 6th | | |
| 1968–69 | 3 | Divizia C (Seria IV) | 9th | | |
| 1967–68 | 3 | Divizia C (Seria South) | 6th | | |
