= Constantin Anghelache Stadium =

Romanian stadium

- Interactive map of Constantin Anghelache Stadium
- Former names: Letea Stadium (1970–2012)
- Address: Str. Letea, nr. 46
- Location: Bacău, Romania
- Coordinates: 46°32′22.5″N 26°55′27.1″E
- Owner: Municipality of Bacău
- Capacity: 2,000 seated
- Surface: Grass

Construction
- Opened: 1970s
- Renovated: 2012

Tenants
- FCM Bacău II (1970–2009); Gauss Bacău (2006–2017); Dinamo Bacău (2017–2023); CSM Bacău (2018–2020, 2022–2025)

The Constantin Anghelache Stadium, known until 2012 as Letea Stadium, is a multi-purpose stadium in Bacău, Romania. Since 27 September 2012, the stadium is named Stadionul Constantin Anghelache in the honor of the former coach who founded the High School of Football Bacău, which was the first football high school with a football program from Romania and also coached children and juniors, teaching and forming generations of players from Bacău, 67 of them reaching the senior or junior national teams of Romania. It is currently used mostly for football matches and is the home ground of Liga III sides Dinamo Bacău and CSM Bacău. Opened in the early 1970s the stadium was for most of its existence the home ground of Letea Bacău, team that would become second team of FCM Bacău in the early 2000s. Between 2006 and 2017 the stadium was also used by Gauss Bacău, team known in the past also as Mesagerul Bacău or SC Bacău. The stadium holds 2,000 people.
