= Daniel Spiridon =

Romanian footballer

Personal information
- Full name: Daniel Octavian Spiridon
- Date of birth: 29 March 1984 (age 42)
- Place of birth: Vaslui, Romania
- Height: 1.84 m (6 ft 0 in)
- Position: Midfielder

Youth career
- FCM Bacău

Senior career*
Years	Team	Apps	(Gls)
2001–2002	FCM Bacău II		
2002–2010	FCM Bacău	40	(6)
2010–2011	Botoșani	21	(2)
2011–2012	SC Bacău		
2012–2015	CF Brăila	54	(3)
Total		115	(11)
- * Club domestic league appearances and goals as of 3 December 2019

Daniel Octavian Spiridon (born 29 March 1984) is a Romanian former professional footballer who played as a midfielder for FCM Bacău, FC Botoșani, SC Bacău and CF Brăila.
