= SC Bacău =

SC Bacău can refer to two Romanian football teams.

- FCM Bacău – named SC Bacău between 1970–1990.
- ACS Gauss Bacău – named SC Bacău between 2010–2017.
