= CSM Bacău (football) =

Romanian football club

- Full name: Clubul Sportiv Municipal Bacău
- Nicknames: CSMeii (The CSMs); Băcăuanii (The People from Bacău)
- Short name: CSM
- Founded: 2016 as CSSM Bacău
- Dissolved: 2025
- Ground: Constantin Anghelache
- Capacity: 2,000
- 2024–25: Liga III, Seria I, 3rd (withdrew)
- Website: http://csmbacau.ro/fotbal/
| Home colours | Away colours |

Clubul Sportiv Municipal Bacău, commonly known as CSM Bacău, was a Romanian professional football club based in Bacău, Bacău County. This team represents the football section of the multi-sport club CSM Bacău, which also include handball, volleyball, athletics, boxing, swimming, tennis, archery, weightlifting, Greco-Roman wrestling, badminton and equestrian sports.

CSM Bacău was established on 28 December 2010 and is fully supported by the Municipality of Bacău. The football section of CSM was established only in 2016 and after three seasons spent in the amateur football (Liga IV and Liga V), managed to promote in the Liga III, where is now an active member.

== History ==
CSM Bacău was founded in 2016, as the football section of the local multi-sport club, which was established on 28 December 2010. CSM is the third project of the Municipality of Bacău which involves the creation of a competitive football team.

The first and the most successful project was FCM Bacău, club that was strongly supported financially in the 1990s and early 2000s, when Dumitru Sechelariu was the Mayor of Bacău. FCM had notable results in the top-flight of the Romanian football and players such as Cristian Ciocoiu, Andrei Cristea, Florin Lovin or Vlad Munteanu made their debut at senior level in the squad of "the Mad Bulls".

In 2010, Romeo Stavarache, the new Mayor of Bacău, decided that FCM, which was further owned by Sechelariu it can no longer be financially supported, not even at the level of the second or third league and decided to financially support Mesagerul Bacău, also changing its name in SC Bacău (a former name of FCM Bacău) and its colors from white and black in white and red. SC Bacău reached Liga II in 2013 and remained at this level until 2016, when it was relegated due to financial problems. SC Bacău was no longer supported by the municipality after mayor Stavarache had legal problems and the club was bought by Cristian Postolache, a local businessman.

In 2016, the new administration of Bacău, led by mayor Cosmin Necula decided the establishment of a football section at the municipality's club, CSM, thus filling the vacancy left by SC Bacău in the multi-sport club organization chart.

Football section of CSM Bacău was enrolled in the Liga V, promoted after only one season in the Liga IV. With Gheorghe Penoff, the former player of SC Bacău, as coach, Băcăuanii won 2018–19 Liga IV Bacău and promotion play-off against champions of Botoșani County, Viitorul Albești (5–0 at Bacău and 1–1 at Albești), and since 2019 is an active member of Liga III.

== Ground ==
Between 2016 and 2020, CSM Bacău played its home matches on Constantin Anghelache Stadium in Bacău, Bacău County. Opened in the early 1970s and formerly known as Letea Stadium, the arena has a capacity of 2,000 seats and was for most of its existence the home ground of Letea Bacău, team that would become second team of FCM Bacău in the early 2000s. Between 2006 and 2017 the stadium was also used by Gauss Bacău, team known in the past also as Mesagerul Bacău or SC Bacău.

Since 2020, CSM Bacău moved for its home matches on Letea Veche Stadium, in Letea Veche, near Bacău, with a capacity of 1,500 people.

== Honours ==
Liga IV – Bacău County

- Winners (1): 2018–19

Liga V – Bacău County

- Winners (1): 2016–17

== League history ==
| Season | Tier | Division | Place | Cupa României |
|---|---|---|---|---|
| 2024–25 | 3 | Liga III (Seria I) | 3rd (R) | |
| 2023–24 | 3 | Liga III (Seria I) | 3rd | |
| 2022–23 | 3 | Liga III (Seria I) | 3rd | |
| 2021–22 | 3 | Liga III (Seria I) | 9th | First Round |
| 2020–21 | 3 | Liga III (Seria II) | 7th | |

| Season | Tier | Division | Place | Cupa României |
|---|---|---|---|---|
| 2019–20 | 3 | Liga III (Seria I) | 15th | |
| 2018–19 | 4 | Liga IV (BC) | 1st (C, P) | |
| 2017–18 | 4 | Liga IV (BC) | 3rd | |
| 2016–17 | 5 | Liga V (BC) | 1st (C, P) | |
