= AFC Atletico Vaslui =

Atletico Vaslui
- Full name: Asociația Fotbal Club; Atletico Vaslui
- Nicknames: Vasluienii (The Vaslui People)
- Short name: Atletico
- Founded: 2014
- Dissolved: 2017
- Ground: Municipal
- Capacity: 9,240
- 2016–17: Liga III, Seria I, 11th (relegated)
Home colours	Away colours	Third colours

Atletico Vaslui was a Romanian football club based in Vaslui, Vaslui County.

== History ==
After the dissolution of FC Vaslui in 2014, two teams were founded in the largest city of Vaslui County, FC Vaslui 2002, a club which continue the history of FC Vaslui and Atletico Vaslui. In the summer of 2014 the team was enrolled in Liga IV – Vaslui County.

After only one season Atletico Vaslui won Liga IV and went to the promotion play-off against SC Bacău II, the second team of SC Bacău and champions of Liga IV – Bacău County. SC Bacău II withdrew from the promotion play-off due to financial reasons and Atletico promoted by forfeit.

2015–16 Liga III season, Atletico's first season in Liga III, showed that the young club was financial, tactical and physical unprepared for this level and finished on 11th place, saved from relegation only by other teams withdrawals.

In the 2016–17 Liga III the club started with a different team and budget and after half of the season they were on 3rd place, with good chances of promotion. During the winter break the team had big financial problems and was on the brink of withdrew, but with one week before the resuming of the championship, the club found financial support to continue. With a few rounds before the end of season the club was excluded from Liga III due to financial problems and subsequently dissolved.

== Honours ==
Liga IV – Vaslui County

- Winners (1): 2014–15

== Former managers ==
- (Romania) Constantin Ilie (2016)
