= 2016–17 Liga III =

Liga III
- Season: 2016–17
- Promoted: Știința Miroslava; Metaloglobus București; SCM Pitești; Ripensia Timișoara; Hermannstadt
- Relegated: Atletico Vaslui; Sportul Chiscani; SC Bacău; Petrolistul Boldești; Arsenal Malu; CS Șirineasa; Urban Titu; CS Podari; UTA II Arad; NMM Becicherecu Mic; ASA II Târgu Mureș; CS Oşorhei; Recolta Dorolț; FC Bistrița
- Matches played: 951
- Goals scored: 3,027 (3.18 per match)
- Top goalscorer: Mediop Ndiaye (21) (Ripensia Timișoara)
- Biggest home win: Înainte 14-1 Arsenal M.
- Biggest away win: Pașcani 1-7 Atletico V. Arsenal M. 0-6 SC Popești; Arsenal M. 0-6 Domnești
- Highest scoring: Înainte 14-1 Arsenal M.
- Longest winning run: 9 matches: SCM Pitești
- Longest unbeaten run: 28 matches: SCM Pitești
- Longest winless run: 26 matches: Arsenal Malu
- Longest losing run: 26 matches: Arsenal Malu
- All statistics correct as of 26 May 2017.

The 2016–17 Liga III is the 61st season of the Liga III, the third tier of the Romanian football league system. The season began on 2 September.

== Team changes ==
=== To Liga III ===
Promoted from Liga IV

- Arsenal Malu
- Avântul Valea Mărului
- Axiopolis Cernavodă
- Cetate Râșnov
- CS Şirineasa
- CSMȘ Reșiţa
- FC Bistrița
- FC Hermannstadt
- FCM Alexandria
- Flacăra Moreni
- Gloria Lunca-Teuz Cermei
- Mureșul Vințu de Jos
- Petrolul Berca
- Recolta Dorolț
- Ripensia Timișoara
- Sportul Chiscani
- Viitorul Ulmeni

Relegated from Liga II —

=== From Liga III ===
Relegated to Liga IV

- Bucovina Rădăuți
- FC Zagon
- Cetatea Târgu Neamț
- Callatis Mangalia
- Inter Olt Slatina
- CSM Sighetu Marmaţiei
- Luceafărul Bălan

Promoted to Liga II

- Sepsi Sfântu Gheorghe
- Juventus București
- Afumați
- ASU Politehnica Timișoara
- Luceafărul Oradea

=== Teams spared from relegation ===
Foresta Suceava, Unirea Tărlungeni and Metalul Reșița were spared from relegation to Liga III due to lack of teams in Liga II.

=== Excluded teams ===
After the end of the last season, Bucovina Pojorâta, Dorohoi, Caransebeș and Muscelul Câmpulung were dissolved. Oțelul Galați, Universitatea Cluj and Bihor Oradea were also dissolved, but refounded in the middle of 2016 and enrolled in Liga IV respectively Liga V.

Farul Constanța dropped out from the Liga II due to financial difficulties and enrolled in Liga III, but then were excluded from Liga III also.

Ceahlăul Piatra Neamț and Gloria Buzău were relegated to Liga V, because the teams were excluded during the 2015–16 Liga II season.

CS Panciu and FC Hunedoara were excluded from Liga III.

Măgura Cisnădie and Inter Dorohoi withdrew from Liga III.

Sporting Turnu Măgurele and Minerul Motru withdrew from Liga III and dissolved their senior teams, but remain with their youth centers.

CS Ineu withdrew from Liga III and enrolled in Liga IV due to financial difficulties.

Unirea Tărlungeni was moved from Tărlungeni to Ștefăneștii de Jos and took all the players and the staff from CS Ștefănești. CS Ștefănești was dissolved.

Metalul Reșița was moved from Reșița to Snagov and took all the players and the staff of Voința Snagov which was dissolved.

Argeș 1953 Pitești, CS Păulești, Mureșul Vințu de Jos, Petrolul Berca, Siretul Lespezi and Voința Ion Creangă declined participation in Liga III due to lack of funds.

=== Other teams ===
SC Bacău withdrew from Liga II due to financial difficulties and enrolled in Liga III.

ACS Poli Timișoara, ASA Târgu Mureș, Astra Giurgiu, CS Mioveni, Gaz Metan Mediaș, Steaua București and UTA Arad enrolled in Liga III their second teams.

Unirea Alba Iulia received the permission to enroll in Liga III, due to the excellent results recorded in the youth championships.

=== Renamed teams ===
Petrotub Roman was renamed as CSM Roman.

Gloria Popești-Leordeni was renamed as SC Popești-Leordeni.

== League tables ==
=== Seria I ===
Pos	Team	Pld	W	D	L	GF	GA	GD	Pts	Promotion or relegation
1	Știința Miroslava (C, P)	28	20	4	4	65	31	+34	64	Promotion to Liga II
2	Hărman	28	19	6	3	63	19	+44	63 (Note: HĂR 1-1 FKM; FKM 1-1 HĂR)	
3	Miercurea Ciuc	28	19	6	3	61	18	+43	63	
4	Aerostar Bacău	28	14	6	8	47	29	+18	48	
5	Avântul Valea Mărului	28	13	4	11	49	53	−4	43	
6	Roman	28	12	4	12	48	50	−2	40	
7	Olimpic Cetate Râșnov	28	11	5	12	33	31	+2	38 (Note: OCT 0-1 SPO; SPO 0-1 OCT)	
8	Sporting Liești	28	11	5	12	40	38	+2	38	
9	Olimpia Râmnicu Sărat	28	10	4	14	33	35	−2	34	
10	Metalosport Galați	28	8	6	14	25	41	−16	30	
11	Atletico Vaslui (Note: Atletico Vaslui was excluded from the championship and lost all matches from the second part of the championship by forfeit.) (R)	27	9	2	16	35	53	−18	29 (Note: The match between SC Bacău and Atletico Vaslui was declared double forfeit because SC Bacău used a suspended player at the time of the match and Atletico Vaslui was subsequently excluded.)	Relegation to Liga IV
12	Odorheiu Secuiesc	28	8	4	16	27	63	−36	28	
13	Pașcani (O)	28	6	5	17	41	65	−24	23	Possible relegation to Liga IV
14	Sportul Chiscani (R)	28	4	4	20	26	67	−41	16	Relegation to Liga IV
15	SC Bacău (Note: SC Bacău were deducted 60 points for unpaid debts.) (R)	27	10	5	12	48	48	0	−25	Relegation to Liga IV

Source: FRF (in Romanian)
Rules for classification: 1st points; 2nd head-to-head points; 3rd head-to-head goal difference; 4th head-to-head goals scored; 5th head-to-head away goals scored; 6th goal difference; 7th number of goals scored
(C) Champions; (O) Play-off winners; (P) Promoted; (R) Relegated

=== Seria II ===
Pos	Team	Pld	W	D	L	GF	GA	GD	Pts	Promotion or relegation
1	Metaloglobus București (C, P)	26	19	3	4	50	27	+23	60	Promotion to Liga II
2	Viitorul Domnești	26	16	1	9	50	28	+22	49	
3	Tunari	26	13	7	6	39	28	+11	46	
4	Viitorul II Constanța	26	13	5	8	52	33	+19	44	
5	Unirea Slobozia	26	12	5	9	49	36	+13	41	
6	Popești-Leordeni	26	11	6	9	40	37	+3	39 (Note: GPL 2-1 DEL; DEL 2-2 GPL)	
7	Delta Dobrogea Tulcea (Note: Delta Dobrogea Tulcea were deducted 2 points for unpaid debts.)	26	12	5	9	52	48	+4	39	
8	Dinamo II București	26	10	8	8	42	32	+10	38	
9	Oltenița	26	10	5	11	41	39	+2	35 (Note: AST 1-1 OLT; OLT 1-1 AST)	
10	Astra II	26	10	5	11	37	36	+1	35	
11	Axiopolis Cernavodă	26	9	7	10	49	47	+2	34	
12	Înainte Modelu (O)	26	7	8	11	60	55	+5	29	Possible relegation to Liga IV
13	Petrolistul Boldești (R)	26	7	1	18	34	59	−25	22	Relegation to Liga IV
14	Arsenal Malu (Note: Arsenal Malu withdrew from the championship during the winter break and lost all matches from the second part of the championship by forfeit.) (R)	26	0	0	26	10	100	−90	0	Relegation to Liga IV

Source: FRF (in Romanian)
Rules for classification: 1st points; 2nd head-to-head points; 3rd head-to-head goal difference; 4th head-to-head goals scored; 5th head-to-head away goals scored; 6th goal difference; 7th number of goals scored
(C) Champions; (O) Play-off winners; (P) Promoted; (R) Relegated

=== Seria III ===
Pos	Team	Pld	W	D	L	GF	GA	GD	Pts	Promotion or relegation
1	SCM Pitești (C, P)	28	22	6	0	72	15	+57	72	Promotion to Liga II
2	Atletic Bradu	28	14	5	9	52	44	+8	47	
3	Alexandria	28	13	6	9	35	28	+7	45	
4	Voluntari II	28	12	8	8	47	38	+9	44	
5	Flacăra Moreni	28	11	10	7	41	29	+12	43	
6	Concordia II Chiajna	28	11	7	10	46	44	+2	40 (Note: CON 0-0 SRO; SRO 2-2 CON)	
7	Sporting Roșiori	28	11	7	10	36	36	0	40	
8	FCSB II	28	10	8	10	42	43	−1	38 (Note: STE 1-0 MIO; MIO 2-2 STE)	
9	Mioveni II	28	10	8	10	38	39	−1	38	
10	Filiași	28	9	10	9	38	33	+5	37	
11	CS U II Craiova	28	10	6	12	42	42	0	36	
12	Aninoasa (O)	28	8	10	10	33	37	−4	34	Possible relegation to Liga IV
13	Şirineasa (R)	28	8	3	17	26	49	−23	27	Relegation to Liga IV
14	Urban Titu (R)	28	5	8	15	29	51	−22	23	Relegation to Liga IV
15	Podari (Note: CS Podari withdrew from the championship and lost all the matches from the second part of the championship by forfeit.) (R)	28	3	4	21	16	65	−49	13	Relegation to Liga IV

Source: FRF (in Romanian)
Rules for classification: 1st points; 2nd head-to-head points; 3rd head-to-head goal difference; 4th head-to-head goals scored; 5th head-to-head away goals scored; 6th goal difference; 7th number of goals scored
(C) Champions; (O) Play-off winners; (P) Promoted; (R) Relegated

=== Seria IV ===
Pos	Team	Pld	W	D	L	GF	GA	GD	Pts	Promotion or relegation
1	Ripensia Timișoara (C, P)	26	16	7	3	69	30	+39	55	Promotion to Liga II
2	CSMȘ Reșița	26	17	3	6	50	19	+31	54	
3	Lugoj	26	15	6	5	42	27	+15	51	
4	Naţional Sebiş	26	15	2	9	43	30	+13	47	
5	Industria Galda	26	13	7	6	41	28	+13	46 (Note: CET 1-3 IND; IND 1-0 CET)	
6	Cetate Deva	26	16	1	9	43	36	+7	49	
7	Performanţa Ighiu	26	11	9	6	44	32	+12	42	
8	Gloria Lunca-Teuz Cermei	26	7	7	12	27	37	−10	28	
9	Poli II Timişoara	26	8	3	15	40	62	−22	27 (Note: PAN 1-2 ACS; ACS 4-0 PAN)	
10	Pandurii II Târgu Jiu	26	8	3	15	31	40	−9	27	
11	Unirea Alba Iulia	26	7	5	14	29	38	−9	26	
12	Millenium Giarmata (O)	26	6	6	14	28	47	−19	24	Possible relegation to Liga IV
13	UTA II Arad (R)	26	5	4	17	22	44	−22	19	Relegation to Liga IV
14	Nuova Mama Mia Becicherecu Mic (R)	26	5	3	18	21	60	−39	18	Relegation to Liga IV

Source: FRF (in Romanian)
Rules for classification: 1st points; 2nd head-to-head points; 3rd head-to-head goal difference; 4th head-to-head goals scored; 5th head-to-head away goals scored; 6th goal difference; 7th number of goals scored
(C) Champions; (O) Play-off winners; (P) Promoted; (R) Relegated

=== Seria V ===
Pos	Team	Pld	W	D	L	GF	GA	GD	Pts	Promotion or relegation
1	Hermannstadt (C, P)	28	21	4	3	64	23	+41	67	Promotion to Liga II
2	Metalurgistul Cugir	28	17	4	7	62	27	+35	55	
3	Sănătatea Cluj	28	15	8	5	42	21	+21	53 (Note: UNJ 1-1 SĂN; SĂN 0-0 UNJ)	
4	Unirea Jucu	28	16	5	7	64	30	+34	53	
5	Comuna Recea	28	14	8	6	50	32	+18	50	
6	FC Zalău	28	15	4	9	41	24	+17	49	
7	Avântul Reghin	28	14	4	10	46	29	+17	46 (Note: AVÂ 3-1 GAZ; GAZ 1-1 AVÂ)	
8	Gaz Metan II Mediaș	28	13	7	8	60	48	+12	46	
9	Unirea Dej	28	10	8	10	44	38	+6	38	
10	Viitorul Ulmeni	28	8	9	11	39	47	−8	33	
11	Iernut	28	9	2	17	45	68	−23	29	
12	Târgu Mureș II (R)	28	8	3	17	31	65	−34	27	Possible relegation to Liga IV
13	Oșorhei (R)	28	7	2	19	32	54	−22	23	Relegation to Liga IV
14	Recolta Dorolț (R)	28	5	2	21	28	71	−43	17	Relegation to Liga IV
15	FC Bistrița (Note: FC Bistrița was excluded from the championship and lost all the matches from the second part of the championship by forfeit.) (R)	28	2	2	24	13	84	−71	8	Relegation to Liga IV

Source: FRF (in Romanian)
Rules for classification: 1st points; 2nd head-to-head points; 3rd head-to-head goal difference; 4th head-to-head goals scored; 5th head-to-head away goals scored; 6th goal difference; 7th number of goals scored
(C) Champions; (P) Promoted; (R) Relegated

== Possible relegation ==
At the end of the championship a special table will be made between 12th places from the 5 series. The last team in this table will relegate also in Liga IV. In this table 12th place teams are included without the points obtained against teams that relegated in their series.

Pos	Team	Pld	W	D	L	GF	GA	GD	Pts	Relegation
1	Aninoasa	22	4	9	9	23	36	−13	21	
2	Înainte Modelu	22	3	8	11	34	49	−15	17	
3	Millenium Giarmata	22	4	5	13	22	42	−20	17	
4	CSM Paşcani	22	4	3	15	31	50	−19	15	
5	Târgu Mureș II (R)	22	4	3	15	20	58	−38	15	Relegation to Liga IV

Source: FRF (in Romanian)
Rules for classification: 1st points; 2nd head-to-head points; 3rd head-to-head goal difference; 4th head-to-head goals scored; 5th head-to-head away goals scored; 6th goal difference; 7th number of goals scored
(R) Relegated
