= 2017–18 Liga IV =

Liga IV
- Season: 2017–18

The 2017–18 Liga IV was the 76th season of Liga IV and the 50th since the 1968 administrative and territorial reorganization of the country, representing the fourth tier of the Romanian football league system. The champions of each county association played against one from a neighbouring county in a play-off for promotion to Liga III.

From this season the counties were divided into 7 regions, each consisting of 6 counties and the draw was made on 28 February 2018, with three months and a half before the first matches.

== County leagues ==
North–East

- Bacău (BC)
- Botoșani (BT)
- Iași (IS)
- Neamț (NT)
- Suceava (SV)
- Vaslui (VS)

North–West

- Bihor (BH)
- Bistrița-Năsăud (BN)
- Cluj (CJ)
- Maramureș (MM)
- Satu Mare (SM)
- Sălaj (SJ)

Center

- Alba (AB)
- Brașov (BV)
- Covasna (CV)
- Harghita (HR)
- Mureș (MS)
- Sibiu (SB)

West

- Arad (AR)
- Caraș-Severin (CS)
- Gorj (GJ)
- Hunedoara (HD)
- Mehedinți (MH)
- Timiș (TM)

South–West

- Argeș (AG)
- Dâmbovița (DB)
- Dolj (DJ)
- Olt (OT)
- Teleorman (TR)
- Vâlcea (VL)

South

- Bucharest (B)
- Călărași (CL)
- Giurgiu (GR)
- Ialomița (IL)
- Ilfov (IF)
- Prahova (PH)

South–East

- Brăila (BR)
- Buzău (BZ)
- Constanța (CT)
- Galați (GL)
- Tulcea (TL)
- Vrancea (VN)

== Promotion play-off ==
The matches were played on 16, 23 and 30 June 2018.

Team 1	Agg.	Team 2	1st leg	2nd leg
Region 1 (North-East)				
Avântul Albești (BT)	0–2	(BC) Gauss Bacău	0–1	0–1
Victoria Lețcani (IS)	w/o	(NT) Ceahlăul Piatra Neamț	w/o	w/o
Șomuz Fălticeni (SV)	6–0	(VS) Flacăra Muntenii de Sus	5–0	1–0
Region 2 (North-West)				
Minaur Baia Mare (MM)	2–0	(BH) Sânmartin	0–0	2–0
Sticla Arieșul Turda (CJ)	10–2	(SJ) Unirea Mirșid	6–0	4–2
Dumitra (BN)	w/o	(SM) Energia Negrești-Oaș	w/o	w/o
Region 3 (Center)				
SR Brașov (BV)	3–0	(CV) Nemere Ghelința	1–0	2–0
Ocna Mureș (AB)	w/o	(HR) Unirea Cristuru Secuiesc	w/o	w/o
MSE 08 Târgu Mureș (MS)	3–3	(SB) Păltiniș Rășinari	2–0	1–3
Region 4 (West)				
Hunedoara (HD)	2–2	(CS) Voința Lupac	0–1	2–1
Crișul Chișineu-Criș (AR)	7–0	(GJ) Petrolul Bustuchin	4–0	3–0 (w/o)
Dumbrăvița (TM)	11–0	(MH) Viitorul Șimian	5–0	6–0
Region 5 (South-West)				
Flacăra Horezu (VL)	9–0	(TR) Rapid Buzescu	8–0	1–0
Unirea Bascov (AG)	3–1	(OT) Vedița Colonești	2–1	1–0
Gloria Cornești (DB)	w/o	(DJ) FCU 1948 Craiova	w/o	w/o
Region 6 (South)				
Abatorul Slobozia (IL)	3–5	(IF) Bragadiru	1–1	2–4
Singureni (GR)	1–17	(B) Rapid București	0–7	1–10
Venus Independența (CL)	6–2	(PH) Blejoi	5–1	1–1
Region 7 (South-East)				
Sportul Ciorăști (VN)	2–5	(CT) Medgidia	2–2	0–3
Pescărușul Sarichioi (TL)	1–8	(BZ) Gloria Buzău	0–3	1–5
CSU Galați (GL)	4–7	(BR) Făurei	0–4	4–3

== League standings ==
=== Alba County ===
Team changes from the previous season

- Șurianu Sebeș achieved promotion to Liga III.
- Vointa Stremț (Series I winners), Arieșul Apuseni Baia de Arieș (Series II winners) and Cuprirom Abrud (Series III winners) were promoted from Liga V Alba.
- Gaz Metan Valea Lungă (16th place) was relegated to Liga V Alba.
- Inter Ciugud and Dalia Sport Daia Romană withdrew.
- Fortuna Lunca Mureșului (13th place) was spared from relegation.
- CS Zlatna, Euro Șpring and Metalul Aiud were admitted upon request.

Pos	Team	Pld	W	D	L	GF	GA	GD	Pts	Qualification or relegation
1	Ocna Mureș (C, Q)	30	21	6	3	82	33	+49	69	Qualification to promotion play-off
2	Sportul Petrești	30	21	4	5	81	20	+61	67	
3	Transalpina Șugag	30	19	3	8	85	40	+45	60	
4	Viitorul Sântimbru	30	17	6	7	57	31	+26	57	
5	Euro Șpring	30	18	1	11	56	37	+19	55	
6	Viitorul Spicul Daia Romană	30	16	4	10	60	41	+19	52	
7	Zlatna	30	16	4	10	67	56	+11	52	
8	CIL Blaj	30	14	7	9	52	39	+13	49	
9	Olimpia Aiud	30	14	3	13	57	51	+6	45	
10	Fortuna Lunca Mureșului	30	13	6	11	52	49	+3	45	
11	Metalul Aiud	30	11	7	12	48	67	−19	40	
12	Energia Săsciori	30	9	7	14	49	65	−16	34	
13	Voința Stremț	30	7	3	20	50	75	−25	24	
14	Cuprirom Abrud	30	5	6	19	43	98	−55	21	
15	Rapid CFR Teiuș (R)	29	2	3	24	23	82	−59	9 (Note: Rapid CFR Teiuș and Arieșul Apuseni withdrew from the championship during the winter break and lost all matches from the second half with 0–3.)	Relegation to Liga V Alba
16	Arieșul Apuseni Baia de Arieș (R)	29	0	2	27	16	94	−78	2	Relegation to Liga V Alba

Rules for classification: 1) Points; 2) Head-to-head points; 3) Head-to-head goal difference; 4) Head-to-head goals scored; 5) Head-to-head away goals scored; 6) Goal difference; 7) Goals scored.
(C) Champions; (Q) Qualified for the phase indicated; (R) Relegated

=== Arad County ===
Team changes from the previous season

- Șoimii Lipova achieved promotion to Liga III.
- UTA Arad II was relegated from Liga III.
- Victoria Nădlac (Series I winners) was promoted from Liga V Arad.
- Crișul Alb Buteni (Series II winners) declined promotion from Liga V Arad.
- UTA Arad III (15th place) and CS Dorobanți (16th place) were relegated to Liga V Arad.

Pos	Team	Pld	W	D	L	GF	GA	GD	Pts	Qualification or relegation
1	Crișul Chișineu-Criș (C, Q)	28	26	1	1	133	10	+123	79	Qualification to promotion play-off
2	Unirea Sântana	28	19	5	4	91	32	+59	62	
3	Victoria Zăbrani	28	16	7	5	82	33	+49	55	
4	Ineu	28	16	4	8	78	43	+35	52	
5	Progresul Pecica	28	14	8	6	66	29	+37	50	
6	Păulișana Păuliș	28	12	9	7	64	53	+11	45	
7	Socodor	28	11	6	11	59	53	+6	39	
8	Glogovăț	28	11	5	12	40	41	−1	38	
9	Voința Mailat	28	9	6	13	56	77	−21	33	
10	Victoria Felnac	28	9	5	14	38	60	−22	32	
11	Șoimii Șimand	28	8	4	16	67	88	−21	28	
12	UTA Arad II	28	6	4	18	69	97	−28	22	
13	Cetate Săvârșin	28	6	2	20	42	125	−83	20	
14	Frontiera Curtici (R)	28	5	3	20	43	87	−44	18	Relegation to Liga V Arad
15	Victoria Nădlac (R)	28	6	3	19	34	134	−100	18 (Note: Victoria Nădlac deducted 3 points.)	Relegation to Liga V Arad

Rules for classification: 1) Points; 2) Head-to-head points; 3) Head-to-head goal difference; 4) Head-to-head goals scored; 5) Head-to-head away goals scored; 6) Goal difference; 7) Goals scored.
(C) Champions; (Q) Qualified for the phase indicated; (R) Relegated

=== Argeș County ===
Team changes from the previous season

- Young Boys Slobozia (14th place; excluded) was relegated to Liga V Argeș.
- AS Colibași (Center Series winners) and CS Mioveni III (North Series winners) were promoted from Liga V Argeș.
- AS Miroși (South Series winners) declined promotion from Liga V Argeș.
- Vulturii Priboieni, Steaua Roșie Slobozia and Rucăr withdrew.
- Olimpia Suseni (15th place) and AS Micești (16th place) were spared from relegation.
- Real Bradu and Inter Câmpulung were admitted upon request.

Pos	Team	Pld	W	D	L	GF	GA	GD	Pts	Qualification or relegation
1	Unirea Bascov (C, Q)	30	30	0	0	184	15	+169	90	Qualification to promotion play-off
2	Victoria Buzoiești	30	19	3	8	70	41	+29	60	
3	Mioveni III	30	18	3	9	99	58	+41	57	
4	Albota	30	17	2	11	94	69	+25	53	
5	Gloria Berevoești	30	14	5	11	65	53	+12	47	
6	Poiana Lacului	30	14	4	12	95	85	+10	46	
7	Sporting Pitești	30	14	3	13	102	68	+34	45 (Note: DLR Pitești–Sporting Pitești 1–4; Sporting Pitești –DLR Pitești 3–1.)	
8	DLR Pitești	30	14	3	13	84	82	+2	45	
9	Inter Câmpulung	30	12	3	15	46	71	−25	39	
10	Colibași	30	12	2	16	69	88	−19	38	
11	Basarabi Curtea de Argeș	30	10	5	15	69	89	−20	35 (Note: Basarabi Curtea de Argeș–Viitorul Ștefănești 1–2; Viitorul Ștefănești –Basarabi Curtea de Argeș 0–5.)	
12	Viitorul Ștefănești	30	11	2	17	50	83	−33	35	
13	Atletic Bradu II (R)	30	10	1	19	55	85	−30	31 (Note: Atletic Bradu II withdrew from the championship after 18 rounds and lost all the remaining matches with 0–3.)	Relegation to Liga V Argeș
14	Real Bradu	30	10	0	20	66	147	−81	30	
15	Micești (R)	30	9	1	20	58	90	−32	28	Relegation to Liga V Argeș
16	Olimpia Suseni (R)	30	7	1	22	52	134	−82	22	Relegation to Liga V Argeș

Rules for classification: 1) Points; 2) Head-to-head points; 3) Head-to-head goal difference; 4) Head-to-head goals scored; 5) Head-to-head away goals scored; 6) Goal difference; 7) Goals scored.
(C) Champions; (Q) Qualified for the phase indicated; (R) Relegated

=== Bacău County ===
Team changes from the previous season

- SC Bacău was relegated from Liga III. It was subsequently renamed Gauss Bacău.
- AS Târgu Ocna (15th place) was relegated to Liga V Bacău.
- CSȘM Bacău (winners) and Uzu Dărmănești (runners-up) were promoted from Liga V Bacău.
- Biruința Letea Veche Bacău withdrew.
- Flamura Roșie Sascut (16th place) was spared from relegation.
- Dinamo Bacău was admitted upon request.

Pos	Team	Pld	W	D	L	GF	GA	GD	Pts	Qualification or relegation
1	Gauss Bacău (C, Q)	34	32	2	0	230	30	+200	98	Qualification to promotion play-off
2	Viitorul Curița	34	29	3	2	208	22	+186	90	
3	CSȘM Bacău	34	22	3	9	113	46	+67	69	
4	Vulturul Măgirești	34	22	2	10	113	77	+36	68	
5	Voința Gârleni	34	21	3	10	86	49	+37	66	
6	Filipești	34	18	3	13	91	76	+15	57	
7	Dinamo Bacău	34	18	2	14	92	78	+14	56	
8	Uzu Dărmănești	34	16	7	11	82	74	+8	55 (Note: Uzu Dărmănești–Voința Oituz 2–0; Voința Oituz –Uzu Dărmănești 1–0.)	
9	Voința Oituz	34	17	4	13	61	63	−2	55	
10	Gloria Zemeș	34	17	3	14	94	94	0	54	
11	Moinești	34	16	3	15	69	73	−4	51	
12	Viitorul Nicolae Bălcescu	34	15	3	16	69	76	−7	48	
13	Negri	34	10	4	20	66	111	−45	34	
14	Măgura Cașin	34	9	3	22	70	124	−54	30	
15	Dofteana	34	5	4	25	43	168	−125	19	
16	Aripile Cleja	34	5	2	27	51	156	−105	17	
17	Siretul Bacău	34	4	2	28	37	137	−100	14	
18	Flamura Roșie Sascut	34	2	3	29	29	150	−121	9	

Rules for classification: 1) Points; 2) Head-to-head points; 3) Head-to-head goal difference; 4) Head-to-head goals scored; 5) Head-to-head away goals scored; 6) Goal difference; 7) Goals scored.
(C) Champions; (Q) Qualified for the phase indicated

=== Bihor County ===
Team changes from the previous season

- CS Oșorhei was relegated from Liga III.
- FC Paleu (14th place; withdrew), Padișul Bihorul Gurani (15th place; withdrew)) and Locadin Țețchea (16th place; withdrew)) were relegated to Liga V Bihor.
- Dacia Gepiu (Series II winners) was promoted from Liga V Bihor.
- FC Bihor Legenda 1902 (Series I winners) was promoted from Liga V Bihor but withdrew before the start of the season and was subsequently dissolved.
- CS Săcueni (Series I runners-up) and Biharea Vașcău (Series II runners-up) from Liga V Bihor were admitted to fill the vacancies.
- CS Oșorhei II was demoted as the reserve team following the relegation of the first team, CS Oșorhei, from Liga III.

Pos	Team	Pld	W	D	L	GF	GA	GD	Pts	Qualification or relegation
1	Sânmartin (C, Q)	30	24	4	2	97	23	+74	76	Qualification for promotion play-off
2	Crișul Sântandrei	30	17	6	7	58	32	+26	57	
3	Unirea Livada	30	16	5	9	70	36	+34	53 (Note: Unirea Livada–Universitatea Oradea 1–1; Universitatea Oradea–Unirea Livada 2–4.)	
4	Universitatea Oradea	30	16	5	9	70	45	+25	53	
5	Dacia Gepiu	30	16	4	10	75	61	+14	52	
6	Diosig	30	14	5	11	50	48	+2	47	
7	Oșorhei	30	13	5	12	69	53	+16	44	
8	Bihorul Beiuș	30	13	4	13	40	52	−12	43	
9	Crișul Aleșd	30	13	3	14	67	75	−8	42	
10	Viitorul Borș	30	12	4	14	67	64	+3	40	
11	Unirea Valea lui Mihai	30	12	2	16	58	67	−9	38	
12	Săcueni	30	12	1	17	50	73	−23	37	
13	Mădăras	30	11	2	17	65	72	−7	35	
14	Ștei	30	10	4	16	39	59	−20	34	
15	Olimpia Salonta (R)	30	8	2	20	52	81	−29	26	Relegation to Liga V Bihor
16	Biharea Vașcău (R)	30	4	2	24	42	128	−86	14	Relegation to Liga V Bihor

Rules for classification: Rules for classification: 1) Points 2) Head-to-head points; 3) Head-to-head goal difference; 4) Head-to-head goals scored; 5) Head-to-head away goals scored; 6) Goal difference; 7) Goals scored.
(C) Champions; (Q) Qualified for the phase indicated; (R) Relegated

=== Bistrița-Năsăud County ===
Team changes from the previous season

- Progresul Tăure (14th place) was relegated to Liga V Bistrița-Năsăud.
- Dinamo Uriu (Series II winners) was promoted from Liga V Bistrița-Năsăud.
- AFC Budac (Series I winners) declined promotion from Liga V Bistrița-Năsăud.
- Viitorul Lechința (15th place) was spared from relegation.

Pos	Team	Pld	W	D	L	GF	GA	GD	Pts	Qualification or relegation
1	Dumitra (C, Q)	28	27	0	1	155	22	+133	81	Qualification to promotion play-off
2	Progresul Năsăud	28	22	3	3	107	32	+75	69	
3	Atletico Monor	28	21	2	5	115	54	+61	65	
4	Heniu Leșu	28	18	2	8	114	46	+68	56	
5	Minerul Rodna	28	16	4	8	84	51	+33	52	
6	Voința Cetate	28	13	1	14	94	99	−5	40	
7	Eciro Forest Telciu	28	12	2	14	53	65	−12	38	
8	Academia Gloria Bistrița	28	11	4	13	70	81	−11	37	
9	Spicul Salva	28	11	4	13	62	85	−23	37	
10	Silvicultorul Maieru	28	12	0	16	92	116	−24	36	
11	Viitorul Lechința	28	10	2	16	68	106	−38	32	
12	Hebe Sângeorz-Băi	28	9	3	16	47	96	−49	30	
13	Dinamo Uriu (R)	26	3	4	19	30	76	−46	13 (Note: Dinamo Uriu withdrew after 16 rounds and lost all remaining matches with 0–3.)	Relegation to Liga V Bistrița-Năsăud
14	Voința Livezile (R)	26	2	3	21	20	92	−72	9 (Note: Voința Livezile and Luceafarul Șieu withdrew after 15 rounds and lost all remaining matches with 0–3.)	Relegation to Liga V Bistrița-Năsăud
15	Luceafărul Șieu (R)	26	2	2	22	19	109	−90	8	Relegation to Liga V Bistrița-Năsăud

Rules for classification: 1) Points; 2) Head-to-head points; 3) Head-to-head goal difference; 4) Head-to-head goals scored; 5) Head-to-head away goals scored; 6) Goal difference; 7) Goals scored.
(C) Champions; (Q) Qualified for the phase indicated; (R) Relegated

=== Botoșani County ===
Team changes from the previous season

- Sănătatea Darabani achieved promotion to Liga III.
- Arsenal Havârna (North Series winners) and FC Ripiceni (South Series winners) declined promotion from Liga V Botoșani.
- Luceafărul Mihai Eminescu, Progresul Ștefănești and Flacăra Vlăsinești withdrew during the previous season.
- Viitorul Dersca and Victoria Hlipiceni withdrew.
- AS 2000 Bucecea, Unirea Săveni, Viitorul Costești and Unirea Curtești were admitted upon request.

Pos	Team	Pld	W	D	L	GF	GA	GD	Pts	Qualification or relegation
1	Avântul Albești (C, Q)	24	22	1	1	83	24	+59	67	Qualification to promotion play-off
2	TransDor Tudora (Note: TransDor Tudora deducted 3 points.)	24	17	3	4	82	34	+48	51 (Note: TransDor Tudora–Prosport Vârfu Câmpului 5–1; Prosport Vârfu Câmpului–TransDor Tudora 0–1.)	
3	Prosport Vârfu Câmpului	24	16	3	5	63	31	+32	51	
4	Bucovina Rogojești	24	12	4	8	67	48	+19	40	
5	Sportivul Trușești	24	12	3	9	76	56	+20	39	
6	Unirea Săveni	24	8	7	9	45	44	+1	31 (Note: Unirea Săveni–Unirea Curtești 5–1; Unirea Curtești–Unirea Săveni 2–2.)	
7	Unirea Curtești	24	9	4	11	62	64	−2	31	
8	Bucecea	24	8	4	12	39	71	−32	28	
9	Rapid Ungureni	24	7	6	11	66	63	+3	27	
10	Europa Hilișeu	24	5	5	14	47	75	−28	20 (Note: Europa Hilișeu–Flacăra 1907 Flămânzi 7–1; Flacăra 1907 Flămânzi–Europa Hilișeu 3–2.)	
11	Flacăra 1907 Flămânzi	24	6	2	16	54	96	−42	20	
12	Voința Șendriceni	24	5	4	15	29	63	−34	19	
13	Viitorul Blândești (R)	24	5	2	17	34	78	−44	17	Relegation to Liga V Botoșani
14	Viitorul Costești (D)	0	0	0	0	0	0	0	0 (Note: Viitorul Costești withdrew from the championship and all its results were canceled.)	Excluded

Rules for classification: 1) Points; 2) Head-to-head points; 3) Head-to-head goal difference; 4) Head-to-head goals scored; 5) Head-to-head away goals scored; 6) Goal difference; 7) Goals scored.
(C) Champions; (D) Disqualified; (Q) Qualified for the phase indicated; (R) Relegated

=== Brașov County ===
Team changes from the previous season

- Viitorul Ghimbav achieved promotion to Liga III.
- Avântul Dumbrăvița (Brașov Series winners) was promoted from Liga V Brașov.
- Oltul Făgăraș (West Făgăraș Series winners) and Luceafărul Mărgineni (East Făgăraș Series winners) declined promotion from Liga V Brașov.
- ACS Hălchiu 2013 withdrew.
- Colțea Brașov, Inter Tărlungeni, SR Brașov and Voința Hurez were admitted upon request.
- ASF Zărnești was renamed Olimpic Zărnești.
- Cetatea Rupea-Homorod was renamed Cetatea Homorod.

Pos	Team	Pld	W	D	L	GF	GA	GD	Pts	Qualification or relegation
1	SR Brașov (C, Q)	30	27	3	0	177	13	+164	84	Qualification to promotion play-off
2	Olimpic Zărnești	30	25	1	4	142	19	+123	76	
3	Precizia Săcele	30	23	4	3	150	30	+120	73	
4	Inter Tărlungeni	30	20	5	5	79	18	+61	65	
5	Inter Cristian	30	19	4	7	115	42	+73	61	
6	Chimia Victoria	30	19	0	11	71	56	+15	57	
7	Steagu Roșu Brașov	30	11	5	14	70	67	+3	38	
8	Aripile Brașov	30	11	4	15	58	77	−19	37	
9	Codlea	30	11	3	16	52	73	−21	36	
10	Colțea Brașov	30	10	4	16	56	67	−11	34	
11	Carpați Berivoi	30	10	1	19	53	134	−81	31	
12	Cetatea Homorod	30	7	5	18	40	106	−66	26	
13	Avântul Dumbrăvița	30	7	2	21	41	104	−63	23	
14	Olimpic Voila (Note: Olimpic Voila was spared from relegation due to the promotion of SR Brașov in Liga III.)	30	6	2	22	38	125	−87	20	Spared from relegation
15	Voința Hurez (R)	30	6	1	23	37	182	−145	19	Relegation to Liga V Brașov
16	Prietenii Rupea (R)	30	5	2	23	46	112	−66	17	Relegation to Liga V Brașov

Rules for classification: 1) Points; 2) Head-to-head points; 3) Head-to-head goal difference; 4) Head-to-head goals scored; 5) Head-to-head away goals scored; 6) Goal difference; 7) Goals scored.
(C) Champions; (Q) Qualified for the phase indicated; (R) Relegated

=== Brăila County ===
Team changes from the previous season

- Victoria Traian achieved promotion to Liga III.
- FC Urleasca (Series I winners), Tricolorul Lanurile (Series II winners) and Viitorul Cireșu (Series III) declined promotion from Liga V Brăila.
- Victoria Cazasu was renamed CSC Cazasu.

Pos	Team	Pld	W	D	L	GF	GA	GD	Pts	Qualification
1	Viitorul Ianca	18	14	3	1	69	8	+61	45	Qualification to championship play-off
2	Făurei	18	13	3	2	81	16	+65	42	Qualification to championship play-off
3	Cazasu	18	13	1	4	64	26	+38	40	Qualification to championship play-off
4	Voința Vișani	18	11	2	5	68	30	+38	35	Qualification to championship play-off
5	Viitorul Șuțești	18	11	1	6	63	32	+31	34	Qualification to championship play-off
6	Pandurii Tudor Vladimirescu	18	7	2	9	52	43	+9	23	Qualification to championship play-out
7	Viitorul Însurăței	18	6	2	10	39	45	−6	20	Qualification to championship play-out
8	Dunărea Tichilești	18	3	2	13	34	95	−61	11	Qualification to championship play-out
9	Gloria Movila Miresii	18	2	1	15	16	82	−66	7	Qualification to championship play-out
10	Dacia Unirea Brăila II	18	1	1	16	21	130	−109	4	Qualification to championship play-out

Rules for classification: 1) Points; 2) Head-to-head points; 3) Head-to-head goal difference; 4) Head-to-head goals scored; 5) Head-to-head away goals scored; 6) Goal difference; 7) Goals scored.

Championship play-off

The teams started the championship play-off with half of the points accumulated in the regular season.

Pos	Team	Pld	W	D	L	GF	GA	GD	Pts	Qualification
1	Făurei (C, Q)	8	7	1	0	26	5	+21	43	Qualification to promotion play-off
2	Viitorul Ianca	8	4	1	3	20	13	+7	36	
3	Cazasu	8	2	1	5	11	33	−22	27	
4	Voința Vișani	8	2	2	4	23	20	+3	26	
5	Viitorul Șuțești	8	2	1	5	12	21	−9	24	

Rules for classification: 1) Points; 2) Head-to-head points; 3) Head-to-head goal difference; 4) Head-to-head goals scored; 5) Head-to-head away goals scored; 6) Goal difference; 7) Goals scored.
(C) Champions; (Q) Qualified for the phase indicated

Championship play-out

The teams started the championship play-out with half of the points accumulated in the regular season.

Pos	Team	Pld	W	D	L	GF	GA	GD	Pts	Relegation
6	Pandurii Tudor Vladimirescu	8	6	2	0	28	11	+17	32	
7	Dunărea Tichilești	8	5	1	2	36	15	+21	22	
8	Viitorul Însurăței	8	4	0	4	19	38	−19	22	
9	Gloria Movila Miresii (R)	8	3	1	4	16	17	−1	14	Relegation to Liga V Brăila
10	Dacia Unirea Brăila II (R)	8	0	0	8	12	30	−18	2	Relegation to Liga V Brăila

Rules for classification: 1) Points; 2) Head-to-head points; 3) Head-to-head goal difference; 4) Head-to-head goals scored; 5) Head-to-head away goals scored; 6) Goal difference; 7) Goals scored.
(R) Relegated

=== Bucharest ===
Team changes from the previous season

- Progresul Spartac București achieved promotion to Liga III.
- Frăția București (16th place; withdrew) was relegated to Liga V Bucharest.
- Progresul Spartac București II (Series I winners) and Mișcarea Feroviară CFR București (Series II runners-up) were promoted from Liga V Bucharest.
- AFC Rapid București (Series II winners) and Asalt București (Series II runners-up) were promoted from Liga V Bucharest.
- Regal Sport Club Ferdinand I, Progresul București, Olimpic București, Electroaparataj București and Electrica București withdrew.
- Steaua București, Carmen București and ACS FC Dinamo București were admitted upon request.
- Romprim București (15th place) was spared from relegation.
- Mișcarea Feroviară CFR București was renamed Academia Rapid București.

Pos	Team	Pld	W	D	L	GF	GA	GD	Pts	Qualification or relegation
1	Academia Rapid București (Q)	28	25	2	1	154	12	+142	77	Qualification to championship play-off
2	Steaua București (Q)	28	23	4	1	154	9	+145	73	Qualification to championship play-off
3	Tricolor București (Q)	28	21	1	6	101	55	+46	64	Qualification to championship play-off
4	ACS FC Dinamo București (Q)	28	18	4	6	77	45	+32	58	Qualification to championship play-off
5	Carmen București	28	18	1	9	88	42	+46	55	
6	Asalt București	28	17	2	9	105	53	+52	53	
7	Comprest GIM București	28	14	4	10	80	46	+34	46	
8	AFC Rapid București	28	13	2	13	80	65	+15	41	
9	Metaloglobus București II	28	10	2	16	59	63	−4	32	
10	Victoria București	28	8	2	18	55	114	−59	26	
11	Termo București	28	7	4	17	57	112	−55	25	
12	Progresul Spartac București II	28	6	2	20	50	83	−33	20	
13	Progresul 2005 București	28	6	2	20	71	162	−91	17 (Note: Progresul 2005 București deducted 3 points.)	
14	Romprim București	28	3	4	21	54	144	−90	13	
15	Venus București (R)	28	3	0	25	34	214	−180	9	Relegation to Liga V Bucharest
16	Sportul Studențesc București (R)	0	0	0	0	0	0	0	0 (Note: Sportul Studențesc București withdrew before the start of the championship.)	Withdrew

Rules for classification: 1) Points; 2) Head-to-head points; 3) Head-to-head goal difference; 4) Head-to-head goals scored; 5) Head-to-head away goals scored; 6) Goal difference; 7) Goals scored.
(Q) Qualified for the phase indicated; (R) Relegated
Notes:

Championship play-off

The championship play-off played in a single round-robin tournament between the best four teams of the regular season. The teams started the play-off with the following points: 1st place – 3 points, 2nd place – 2 points, 3rd place – 1 point, 4th place – 0 points.

Pos	Team	Pld	W	D	L	GF	GA	GD	Pts	Qualification
1	Academia Rapid București (C, Q)	3	3	0	0	10	0	+10	12	Qualification to promotion play-off
2	Steaua București	3	1	1	1	7	3	+4	6	
3	ACS FC Dinamo București	3	0	2	1	3	7	−4	2	
4	Tricolor București	3	0	1	2	2	12	−10	2	

Rules for classification: 1) Points; 2) Head-to-head points; 3) Head-to-head goal difference; 4) Head-to-head goals scored; 5) Head-to-head away goals scored; 6) Goal difference; 7) Goals scored.
(C) Champions; (Q) Qualified for the phase indicated

=== Buzău County ===
Team changes from the previous season

- Metalul Buzău achieved promotion to Liga III.
- Gloria Vadu Pașii (15th place) and Șoimii Costești (16th place) were relegated to Liga V Buzău.
- FC Buzău (Series I winners), AS Balta Albă (Series II winners) were promoted from Liga V Buzău.
- Pescărușul Luciu (Series II runners-up and promotion/relegation play-off winners) ceded its place to Olimpia Râmnicu Sărat II.
- FC Buzău was renamed SCM Gloria Buzău.

Pos	Team	Pld	W	D	L	GF	GA	GD	Pts	Qualification or relegation
1	Gloria Buzău (C, Q)	30	25	5	0	144	13	+131	80	Qualification to promotion play-off
2	Team Săgeata	30	23	6	1	94	20	+74	75	
3	Voința Lanurile	30	22	4	4	107	34	+73	70	
4	Locomotiva Buzău	29	17	5	7	96	52	+44	56	
5	Montana Pătârlagele	30	16	6	8	85	52	+33	54	
6	Balta Albă	30	14	4	12	68	59	+9	46	
7	Recolta Sălcioara	30	13	6	11	53	52	+1	45 (Note: Avântul Zărnești–Recolta Sălcioara 3–1; Recolta Sălcioara–Avântul Zărnești 3–0)	
8	Avântul Zărnești	30	14	3	13	94	79	+15	45	
9	Tricolorul Gălbinași	30	12	3	15	72	86	−14	39	
10	Înfrățirea Zoița	30	10	4	16	56	72	−16	34	
11	Petrolul Berca	30	9	4	17	62	110	−48	31	
12	Diadema Gherăseni	29	8	4	17	47	100	−53	28	
13	Viitorul 08 Vernești	30	7	4	19	54	104	−50	25 (Note: Olimpia Râmnicu Sărat II–Viitorul 08 Vernești 3–2; Viitorul 08 Vernești–Olimpia Râmnicu Sărat II 5–2)	
14	Olimpia Râmnicu Sărat II (O)	30	8	1	21	54	100	−46	25	Qualification to relegation play-off
15	Șoimii Siriu (R)	30	6	5	19	65	128	−63	23	Qualification to relegation play-off
16	Victoria Boboc (R)	30	3	0	27	16	106	−90	9	Relegation to Liga V Buzău

Rules for classification: 1) Points; 2) Head-to-head points; 3) Head-to-head goal difference; 4) Head-to-head goals scored; 5) Head-to-head away goals scored; 6) Goal difference; 7) Goals scored.
(C) Champions; (O) Play-off winners; (Q) Qualified for the phase indicated; (R) Relegated
Notes:

Relegation play-off

The 14th and 15th-placed teams of Liga IV Buzău faces the 2nd-placed teams in the two series of Liga V Buzău.

Team 1	Score	Team 2
Olimpia Râmnicu Sărat II	4–3	Pescărușul Luciu
Săhăteni Vintileanca	1–0	Șoimii Siriu

=== Caraș-Severin County ===
Team changes from the previous season

- Recolta Rafnic (13th place) was relegated to Liga V Caraș-Severin.
- Foresta Armeniș (Caransebeș Zone winners) and Steaua Dunării Pojejena (Reșița Zone winners) were promoted from Liga V Caraș-Severin.
- Muncitorul Reșița and Ad Mediam Mehadia withdrew.
- Croația Clocotici was admitted upon request.
- Minerul Anina was renamed CSO Anina.

Pos	Team	Pld	W	D	L	GF	GA	GD	Pts	Qualification or relegation
1	Voința Lupac (C, Q)	22	21	1	0	113	8	+105	64	Qualification to promotion play-off
2	Viitorul Caransebeș	22	18	1	3	121	26	+95	55	
3	Oravița	22	12	3	7	57	45	+12	39	
4	Moldova Nouă	22	10	5	7	49	41	+8	35	
5	Croația Clocotici	22	9	4	9	58	66	−8	31	
6	Metalul Bocșa	22	9	2	11	47	60	−13	29	
7	Anina	22	9	1	12	38	81	−43	28	
8	Rapid Buchin	22	8	3	11	51	56	−5	27	
9	Nera Bozovici	22	8	2	12	44	78	−34	26	
10	Berzasca	22	7	3	12	41	52	−11	24	
11	Foresta Armeniș	22	4	1	17	41	96	−55	13	
12	Steaua Dunării Pojejena (R)	22	3	2	17	17	68	−51	11 (Note: Steaua Dunării Pojejena withdrew and lost all the remaining matches with 0–3.)	Relegation to Liga V Caraș-Severin
13	Agmonia Zăvoi (R)	0	0	0	0	0	0	0	0 (Note: Agmonia Zăvoi withdrew from the championship and all its results were canceled.)	Excluded

Rules for classification: 1) Points; 2) Head-to-head points; 3) Head-to-head goal difference; 4) Head-to-head goals scored; 5) Head-to-head away goals scored; 6) Goal difference; 7) Goals scored.
(C) Champions; (Q) Qualified for the phase indicated; (R) Relegated

=== Călărași County ===
Team changes from the previous season

- Agricola Borcea achieved promotion to Liga III.
- Dinamo Sărulești (14th place), Rapid Ulmeni (15th place) and Conpet Ștefan Cel Mare (16th place) were relegated to Liga V Călărași.
- Partizan Crivăț (winners) and Mostiștea Ulmu (runners-up) were promoted from the Series A of Liga V Călărași.
- Zarea Cuza Vodă (winners) and Tricolorul Jegălia (runners-up) were promoted from the Series B of Liga V Călărași.

Pos	Team	Pld	W	D	L	GF	GA	GD	Pts	Qualification or relegation
1	Venus Independența (C, Q)	30	28	2	0	136	29	+107	86	Qualification to promotion play-off
2	Dunărea Ciocănești	30	25	2	3	106	36	+70	77	
3	Mostiștea Ulmu	30	22	4	4	126	27	+99	70	
4	Victoria Chirnogi	30	19	3	8	99	47	+52	60	
5	Roseți	30	17	4	9	84	66	+18	55	
6	Unirea Mânăstirea	30	16	2	12	85	57	+28	50	
7	Tricolorul Jegălia	30	11	3	16	58	68	−10	36 (Note: Tricolorul Jegălia–Dunărea Grădiștea 1–2; Dunărea Grădiștea–Tricolorul Jegălia 2–4)	
8	Dunărea Grădiștea	30	10	6	14	63	72	−9	36	
9	Victoria Lehliu	30	11	2	17	91	82	+9	35	
10	Steaua Radovanu	30	9	4	17	45	80	−35	31 (Note: Steaua Radovanu–Zarea Cuza Vodă 1–2; Zarea Cuza Vodă–Steaua Radovanu 1–3)	
11	Zarea Cuza Vodă	30	9	4	17	54	99	−45	31	
12	Spicul Vâlcelele	30	9	2	19	65	108	−43	29	
13	Partizan Crivăț	30	8	3	19	54	123	−69	27	
14	Viitorul Curcani	30	8	2	20	47	99	−52	26 (Note: Unirea Dragalina–Viitorul Curcani 3–2; Viitorul Curcani–Unirea Dragalina 2–1)	
15	Unirea Dragalina	30	8	2	20	43	110	−67	26	Spared from relegation
16	Progresul Fundulea	30	6	3	21	43	96	−53	21	Spared from relegation

Rules for classification: 1) Points; 2) Head-to-head points; 3) Head-to-head goal difference; 4) Head-to-head goals scored; 5) Head-to-head away goals scored; 6) Goal difference; 7) Goals scored.
(C) Champions; (Q) Qualified for the phase indicated

=== Cluj County ===
Team changes from the previous season

- Alb-Negru al Studenților Clujeni achieved promotion to Liga III.
- Viitorul Feleacu (Cluj Zone winners) and Unirea Iclod (Gherla Zone winners) were promoted from Liga V Cluj.
- Liga V Cluj winners Șoimii Câmpia Turzii (Câmpia Turzii Zone), Progresul Nireș (Dej Zone) and Gloria Cătina (Mociu Zone) declined promotion from Liga V Cluj.
- Ardealul Cluj and Unirea Florești withdrew.
- Universitatea Cluj II and Unirea Sporting Apahida were admitted upon request.
- Industria Sârmei Câmpia Turzii was renamed CSM Câmpia Turzii.

Pos	Team	Pld	W	D	L	GF	GA	GD	Pts	Qualification or relegation
1	Sticla Arieșul Turda (C, Q)	30	27	3	0	175	22	+153	84	Qualification for the promotion play-off
2	Florești	30	21	6	3	103	32	+71	69	
3	Atletic Olimpia Gherla	30	20	4	6	83	25	+58	64	
4	Unirea Tritenii de Jos	30	19	3	8	85	52	+33	60	
5	Arieșul Mihai Viteazu	30	18	4	8	97	48	+49	58	
6	Unirea Iclod	30	18	2	10	108	47	+61	56	
7	Universitatea Cluj II	30	17	4	9	114	52	+62	55	
8	Sporting Apahida	30	16	6	8	62	44	+18	54	
9	Câmpia Turzii	30	13	2	15	74	71	+3	41	
10	Vulturul Mintiu Gherlii	30	12	2	16	67	100	−33	38	
11	Viile Dejului	30	7	5	18	51	103	−52	26	
12	Someșul Gilău	30	6	7	17	66	97	−31	25	
13	Armenopolis Gherla	30	5	8	17	61	100	−39	23	
14	CFR Dej	30	4	5	21	35	132	−97	17	
15	Viitorul Feleacu (R)	30	3	4	23	58	162	−104	13	Relegation to Liga V Cluj
16	Viitorul Mihai Georgescu Cluj-Napoca (R)	30	0	3	27	17	169	−152	3 (Note: Viitorul Mihai Georgescu Cluj-Napoca withdrew after 22 rounds and lost all the remaining matches with 0–3.)	Withdrew

Rules for classification: 1) Points; 2) Head-to-head points; 3) Head-to-head goal difference; 4) Head-to-head goals scored; 5) Head-to-head away goals scored; 6) Goal difference; 7) Goals scored.
(C) Champions; (Q) Qualified for the phase indicated; (R) Relegated

=== Constanța County ===
Team changes from the previous season

- Farul Constanța achieved promotion to Liga III.
- CFR Constanța (18th place) was relegated to Liga V Constanța.
- CS Lipnița Carvăn (winners) and CS Agigea (3rd place) were promoted from Liga V Constanța.
- Litoral 22 Corbu (runners-up) declined promotion from Liga V Constanța.
- Victoria Mihai Viteazu and Avântul Comana withdrew.
- Voința Valu lui Traian (17th place) was spared from relegation.

Pos	Team	Pld	W	D	L	GF	GA	GD	Pts	Qualification or relegation
1	Medgidia (C, Q)	30	27	2	1	143	28	+115	83	Qualification to promotion play-off
2	Viitorul Fântânele	30	25	3	2	124	39	+85	78	
3	Năvodari	30	22	2	6	108	32	+76	68	
4	Gloria Băneasa	29	17	4	8	102	51	+51	55	
5	Ovidiu	30	16	2	12	79	77	+2	50	
6	Sparta Techirghiol	30	14	4	12	92	69	+23	46	
7	Agigea	30	14	3	13	62	60	+2	45 (Note: Agigea–Mihail Kogălniceanu 5–0; Mihail Kogălniceanu–Agigea 1–1.)	
8	Mihail Kogălniceanu	30	14	3	13	84	93	−9	45	
9	Gloria Albești	30	14	1	15	71	71	0	43	
10	Lipnița Carvăn	30	13	2	15	90	96	−6	41	
11	Eforie	30	10	7	13	77	82	−5	37	
12	Portul Constanța	29	10	5	14	73	69	+4	35	
13	Farul Tuzla	30	10	3	17	73	79	−6	33	
14	Știința ACALAB Poarta Albă	30	5	5	20	50	103	−53	20	
15	Unirea Topraisar (R)	30	3	1	26	31	142	−111	10	Relegation to Liga V Constanța
16	Voința Valu lui Traian (R)	30	1	1	28	30	198	−168	4	Relegation to Liga V Constanța

Rules for classification: 1) Points; 2) Head-to-head points; 3) Head-to-head goal difference; 4) Head-to-head goals scored; 5) Head-to-head away goals scored; 6) Goal difference; 7) Goals scored.
(C) Champions; (Q) Qualified for the phase indicated; (R) Relegated

=== Covasna County ===
Team changes from the previous season

- KSE Târgu Secuiesc achieved promotion to Liga III.
- Oltul Chilieni (16th place) was relegated to Liga V Covasna.
- Stăruința Zagon (winners) and Dozsa Dalnic (runners-up) were promoted from Liga V Covasna.

Pos	Team	Pld	W	D	L	GF	GA	GD	Pts	Qualification or relegation
1	Nemere Ghelința (C, Q)	28	22	4	2	94	23	+71	70	Qualification to promotion play-off
2	Păpăuți	28	20	5	3	73	28	+45	65	
3	Stăruința Zagon	28	19	5	4	90	29	+61	62	
4	Harghita Aita Mare	28	18	4	6	71	34	+37	58	
5	Prima Brăduț	28	17	6	5	77	28	+49	57	
6	Baraolt	28	12	2	14	56	64	−8	38	
7	Avântul Ilieni	28	11	4	13	49	57	−8	37	
8	Cernat	28	10	5	13	48	78	−30	35	
9	Dozsa Dalnic	28	9	6	13	56	69	−13	33	
10	Covasna	28	8	7	13	49	51	−2	31	
11	Reci	28	6	9	13	40	63	−23	27	
12	Perkö Sânzieni	28	6	5	17	34	69	−35	23	
13	Ojdula	28	7	1	20	40	69	−29	22	
14	Brețcu	28	6	2	20	38	93	−55	20	
15	BSE Belin (R)	28	6	1	21	42	102	−60	19	Relegation to Liga V Covasna
16	Venus Ozun (D)	0	0	0	0	0	0	0	0 (Note: Venus Ozun withdrew in the first half of the season and all its results were canceled.)	Withdrew

Rules for classification: 1) Points; 2) Head-to-head points; 3) Head-to-head goal difference; 4) Head-to-head goals scored; 5) Head-to-head away goals scored; 6) Goal difference; 7) Goals scored.
(C) Champions; (D) Disqualified; (Q) Qualified for the phase indicated; (R) Relegated

=== Dâmbovița County ===
Team changes from the previous season

- CS Petrești (16th place), Gaz Metan Finta (17th place; withdrew) and Libertatea Urziceanca (18th place; withdrew) were relegated to Liga V Dâmbovița.
- Unirea Colibasi (North Series winners), Unirea Bucșani (South Series winners) and Roberto Ziduri (West Series winners) were promoted from Liga V Dâmbovița.
- Dentaș Tărtășești and PAS Pucioasa withdrew.
- Olimpicii Ulmi and ACS Coada Izvorului were admitted upon request.
- Atletic Fieni was renamed CSM Fieni.

Pos	Team	Pld	W	D	L	GF	GA	GD	Pts	Qualification or relegation
1	Gloria Cornești (C, Q)	34	31	2	1	189	30	+159	95	Qualification to promotion play-off
2	Recolta Gura Șuții	34	30	1	3	134	38	+96	91	
3	Unirea Ungureni	34	24	2	8	101	51	+50	74	
4	Roberto Ziduri	34	21	4	9	97	70	+27	67	
5	Voința Perșinari	34	18	4	12	107	69	+38	58	
6	Unirea Bucșani	34	18	3	13	115	70	+45	57	
7	Olimpicii Ulmi	34	17	2	15	112	70	+42	53	
8	Fieni	34	15	6	13	97	92	+5	51	
9	Brezoaele	34	14	2	18	90	91	−1	44	
10	Unirea Colibași	34	12	4	18	67	76	−9	40	
11	Luceafărul Dragomirești	34	12	4	18	82	101	−19	40	
12	Petrolul Târgoviște	34	12	2	20	72	92	−20	38	
13	Coada Izvorului	34	11	5	18	72	113	−41	38	
14	Progresul Mătăsaru	34	11	2	21	71	121	−50	35	
15	Viitorul I.L. Caragiale	34	11	2	21	48	106	−58	35	
16	Spic de Grâu Ghimpați (R)	34	11	0	23	66	95	−29	33	Relegation to Liga V Dâmbovița
17	Flacăra Zăvoiu (R)	34	8	2	24	63	151	−88	26	Relegation to Liga V Dâmbovița
18	Bradul Moroeni (R)	34	5	3	26	43	190	−147	18	Relegation to Liga V Dâmbovița

Rules for classification: 1) Points; 2) Head-to-head points; 3) Head-to-head goal difference; 4) Head-to-head goals scored; 5) Head-to-head away goals scored; 6) Goal difference; 7) Goals scored.
(C) Champions; (Q) Qualified for the phase indicated; (R) Relegated

=== Dolj County ===
Team changes from the previous season

- Știința Malu Mare (11th place) was relegated to Liga V Dolj.
- Flacăra Moțăței (Series I winners) was promoted from Liga V Dolj.
- Gloria Catane (Series II winners), Progresul Castranova (Series III winners), Victoria Știința Celaru (Series IV winners) and Voința Belcin (Series V winners) declined promotion from Liga V Dolj .
- Luceafărul Craiova (12th place) withdrew during the previous season.
- Unirea Leamna and Arena Bulls Preajba withdrew.
- FCU 1948 Craiova, Unirea Tricolor Dăbuleni, Jiul Podari, Progresul Băilești and Victoria Plenița were admitted upon request.

Pos	Team	Pld	W	D	L	GF	GA	GD	Pts	Qualification or relegation
1	FCU 1948 Craiova	26	26	0	0	145	21	+124	78	Qualification to championship play-off
2	Jiul Podari	26	19	3	4	72	32	+40	60	Qualification to championship play-off
3	Dunărea Calafat	26	17	4	5	73	32	+41	55	Qualification to championship play-off
4	Știința Danubius Bechet	26	17	2	7	63	46	+17	53	Qualification to championship play-off
5	Viitorul Cârcea	26	15	4	7	82	54	+28	49	Qualification to League cup
6	Metropolitan Ișalnița	26	14	1	11	67	54	+13	43	Qualification to League cup
7	Tractorul Cetate	26	11	3	12	61	69	−8	36	Qualification to League cup
8	Progresul Segarcea	26	11	2	13	70	68	+2	35	Qualification to League cup
9	Unirea Tricolor Dăbuleni	26	9	3	14	63	79	−16	30	Qualification to League cup
10	Progresul Băilești (R)	26	7	4	15	34	49	−15	25 (Note: Progresul Băilești withdrew after 17 rounds and lost all the remaining matches with 0–3.)	Relegation to Liga V Dolj
11	Flacăra Moțăței	26	7	1	18	36	76	−40	22	Qualification to League cup
12	Victoria Plenița	26	6	1	19	45	93	−48	19	Qualification to League cup
13	Recolta Ostroveni	26	6	1	19	52	104	−52	19	Qualification to League cup
14	Ajax Dobrotești (R)	26	2	1	23	20	106	−86	7	Relegation to Liga V Dolj

Rules for classification: 1) Points; 2) Head-to-head points; 3) Head-to-head goal difference; 4) Head-to-head goals scored; 5) Head-to-head away goals scored; 6) Goal difference; 7) Goals scored.
(R) Relegated
Notes:

Championship play-off

At the end of the regular season, the first four teams played a championship play-off, with the winners crowned as county champions and qualified for the promotion play-off to Liga III. The teams started the play-off with the number of points they had gained in the regular season only against the other qualified teams.

Pos	Team	Pld	W	D	L	GF	GA	GD	Pts	Qualification or relegation
1	FCU 1948 Craiova (C, Q)	12	12	0	0	54	7	+47	36	Qualification for promotion play-off
2	Dunărea Calafat	12	4	1	7	17	27	−10	13	
3	Jiul Podari	12	3	2	7	19	28	−9	11	
4	Știința Danubius Bechet	12	2	3	7	15	43	−28	9	

Rules for classification: 1) Points; 2) Head-to-head points; 3) Head-to-head goal difference; 4) Head-to-head goals scored; 5) Head-to-head away goals scored; 6) Goal difference; 7) Goals scored.
(C) Champions; (Q) Qualified for the phase indicated

League Cup

The teams which were ranked 5th to 12th places in the regular season played in the League Cup to establish the final standings. In the League Cup, each tie was played on a home-and-away two-legged basis. If tied on aggregate, the away goals rule was used.

First round

First Leg: 5 and 6 May. Second Leg: 11 and 12 May.

Team 1	Agg.	Team 2	1st leg	2nd leg
Recolta Ostroveni	2–11	Viitorul Cârcea	2–5	0–9
Unirea Tricolor Dăbuleni	9–3	Progresul Segarcea	7–2	2–1
Flacăra Moțăței	0–7	Tractorul Cetate	0–4	0–3
Victoria Plenița	1–5	Metropolitan Ișalnița	1–4	0–1

Second round

First Leg: 19 May. Second Leg: 26 May.

5-8 places

Team 1	Agg.	Team 2	1st leg	2nd leg
Unirea Tricolor Dăbuleni	2–8	Viitorul Cârcea	1–1	1–6
Tractorul Cetate	4–4	Metropolitan Ișalnița	4–3	0–1

9-12 places

Team 1	Agg.	Team 2	1st leg	2nd leg
Recolta Ostroveni	5–9	Progresul Segarcea	4–4	1–5
Victoria Plenița	7–6	Flacăra Moțăței	5–3	2–3

Third round

First Leg: 2 June. Second Leg: 8 and 10 June.

5-6 places

Team 1	Agg.	Team 2	1st leg	2nd leg
Metropolitan Ișalnița	2–5	Viitorul Cârcea	1–2	1–3

7-8 places

Team 1	Agg.	Team 2	1st leg	2nd leg
Unirea Tricolor Dăbuleni	16–6	Tractorul Cetate	8–1	8–5

9-10 places

Team 1	Agg.	Team 2	1st leg	2nd leg
Progresul Segarcea	8–7	Victoria Plenița	5–3	3–4

11-12 places

Team 1	Agg.	Team 2	1st leg	2nd leg
Recolta Ostroveni	6–4	Flacăra Moțăței	6–1	0–3

=== Galați County ===
Team changes from the previous season

- Oțelul Galați achieved promotion to Liga III.
- CSȘ Tecuci (13th place) and Bujorii Târgu Bujor (14th place) were relegated to Liga V Galați.
- Mălina Smârdan (winners) and Unirea Conachi (runners-up) declined promotion from Liga V Galați.
- Siretul Piscu withdrew.
- CSU Galați, Viitorul Umbrărești and Agrostar Tulucești were admitted upon request.

Pos	Team	Pld	W	D	L	GF	GA	GD	Pts	Qualification or relegation
1	CSU Galați (C, Q)	24	21	1	2	116	16	+100	64	Qualification to promotion play-off
2	Zimbrul Slobozia Conachi	24	20	1	3	131	32	+99	61	
3	Gloria Ivești	24	18	2	4	71	18	+53	56	
4	Unirea Braniștea	24	16	4	4	71	38	+33	52	
5	Agrostar Tulucești	24	13	2	9	64	58	+6	41	
6	Viitorul Umbrărești	24	9	4	11	59	56	+3	31	
7	Victoria Independența	24	8	4	12	37	80	−43	28	
8	Muncitorul Ghidigeni	24	8	2	14	55	65	−10	26	
9	Quantum Club Galați	24	8	2	14	46	73	−27	26	
10	Avântul Drăgănești	24	6	2	16	38	74	−36	20	
11	Avântul Vânători	24	6	2	16	39	92	−53	20	
12	Viitorul Costache Negri	24	6	0	18	44	100	−56	18	
13	Juventus Toflea	24	3	2	19	39	108	−69	11	Relegation to Liga V Galați

Rules for classification: 1) Points; 2) Head-to-head points; 3) Head-to-head goal difference; 4) Head-to-head goals scored; 5) Head-to-head away goals scored; 6) Goal difference; 7) Goals scored.
(C) Champions; (Q) Qualified for the phase indicated

=== Giurgiu County ===
Team changes from the previous season

- Energia Remuș (South Series winners) and Pro Giurgiu (South Series runners-up) were promoted from Liga V Giurgiu.
- Unirea Cosoba (North Series winners) and AS Iepurești (North Series runners-up) were promoted Liga V Giurgiu.
- Unirea Frătești (South Series 13th place), MV Călugăreni (South Series 14th place), Argeșul Mihăilești (North Series 13th place) and Olimpia Mârșa (North Series 14th place) were spared from relegation.
- Voința Toporu withdrew.

South Series

Pos	Team	Pld	W	D	L	GF	GA	GD	Pts	Qualification or relegation
1	Energia Remuș (Q)	26	23	1	2	108	34	+74	70	Qualification to championship play-off
2	Dunărea Giurgiu (Q)	26	22	2	2	137	29	+108	68	Qualification to championship play-off
3	Mihai Bravu	26	17	3	6	91	49	+42	54	
4	Victoria Adunații-Copăceni	26	17	2	7	98	43	+55	53	
5	Giganții Vărăști	26	16	1	9	80	59	+21	49	
6	Pro Giurgiu	26	13	3	10	68	52	+16	42	
7	Real Colibași	26	13	2	11	65	76	−11	41	
8	Spicul Izvoru	26	10	3	13	50	77	−27	33	
9	Unirea Izvoarele	26	10	2	14	57	77	−20	32	
10	Voința Slobozia	26	8	2	16	52	78	−26	26	
11	Dunărea Oinacu	26	7	3	16	41	65	−24	24	
12	Viitorul Vedea	26	7	2	17	51	102	−51	23	
13	Unirea Frătești	26	3	1	22	52	122	−70	10	
14	MV Călugăreni	26	2	1	23	26	113	−87	2 (Note: MV Călugăreni deducted 5 points.)	
15	Progresul Valea Dragului (D)	0	0	0	0	0	0	0	0 (Note: Progresul Valea Dragului withdrew after 6 rounds and all its results were canceled.)	Withdrew
16	Prundu (D)	0	0	0	0	0	0	0	0 (Note: Prundu withdrew after 2 rounds and all its results were canceled.)	Withdrew

Rules for classification: 1) Points; 2) Head-to-head points; 3) Head-to-head goal difference; 4) Head-to-head goals scored; 5) Head-to-head away goals scored; 6) Goal difference; 7) Goals scored.
(D) Disqualified; (Q) Qualified for the phase indicated
Notes:

North Series

Pos	Team	Pld	W	D	L	GF	GA	GD	Pts	Qualification or relegation
1	Argeșul Mihăilești (Q)	26	22	1	3	113	24	+89	67	Qualification to championship play-off
2	Singureni (Q)	26	20	5	1	109	32	+77	65	Qualification to championship play-off
3	Avântul Florești	26	20	1	5	72	30	+42	61	
4	Bolintin Malu Spart	26	18	4	4	82	33	+49	58	
5	Unirea Vânătorii Mici	26	14	3	9	59	45	+14	45	
6	Bolintin-Deal	26	12	3	11	68	79	−11	39	
7	Petrolul Roata de Jos	26	10	2	14	52	62	−10	32	
8	Unirea Cosoba	26	8	6	12	32	56	−24	30	
9	Iepurești	26	10	0	16	49	85	−36	30	
10	Zmeii Ogrezeni	26	9	1	16	61	74	−13	28	
11	Silver Inter Zorile	26	6	2	18	64	101	−37	17 (Note: Silver Inter Zorile deducted 3 points.)	
12	Luceafărul Trestieni	26	4	4	18	51	81	−30	16	
13	Unirea Joița	26	6	3	17	40	85	−45	16 (Note: Unirea Joița deducted 5 points.)	
14	Viitorul Tântava	26	4	3	19	37	102	−65	15	
15	Olimpia Mârșa (D)	0	0	0	0	0	0	0	0 (Note: Olimpia Mârșa withdrew after 7 rounds and all its results were canceled.)	Withdrew
16	Voința Podișor (D)	0	0	0	0	0	0	0	0 (Note: Voința Podișor withdrew after 5 rounds and all its results were canceled.)	Withdrew

Rules for classification: 1) Points; 2) Head-to-head points; 3) Head-to-head goal difference; 4) Head-to-head goals scored; 5) Head-to-head away goals scored; 6) Goal difference; 7) Goals scored.
(D) Disqualified; (Q) Qualified for the phase indicated
Notes:

Championship play-off

The championship play-off was played between the two highest-ranked teams from each series of the regular season. All matches took place at Comunal Stadium in Bolintin-Deal on 5 and 7 June 2018 for the semi-finals, and on 10 June 2018 for the final.

Semi-finals

Team 1	Score	Team 2
Energia Remuș	1–3	Singureni
Argeșul Mihăilești	4–3	Dunărea Giurgiu

Final

Team 1	Score	Team 2
Singureni	3–1	Argeșul Mihăilești

Singureni won the Liga IV Giurgiu County and qualified for the promotion play-off in Liga III.

=== Gorj County ===
Team changes from the previous season

- Internațional Bălești achieved promotion to Liga III.
- Viitorul Plopșoru (winners) and Triumful Borăscu (runners-up) declined promotion from Liga V Gorj.
- Viitorul Negomir was spared from relegation.
- Avântul Baia de Fier was admitted upon request.

Pos	Team	Pld	W	D	L	GF	GA	GD	Pts	Qualification or relegation
1	Petrolul Bustuchin (C, Q)	30	28	2	0	128	9	+119	86	Qualification to promotion play-off
2	Știința Turceni	30	24	3	3	121	23	+98	75	
3	Vulturii Fărcășești	30	19	3	8	79	62	+17	60	
4	Petrolul Țicleni	30	17	5	8	71	43	+28	56	
5	Gilortul Târgu Cărbunești	30	16	5	9	88	50	+38	53	
6	Jiul Rovinari	30	15	8	7	66	41	+25	53	
7	Parângul Bumbești-Jiu	30	16	4	10	80	57	+23	52	
8	Novaci	30	15	4	11	61	41	+20	49	
9	Unirea Crușeț	30	12	4	14	64	63	+1	40	
10	Minerul Mătăsari II	30	11	4	15	47	83	−36	37	
11	Energetica Tismana	30	8	2	20	47	81	−34	26	
12	Stejari	30	7	4	19	41	103	−62	25	
13	Avântul Baia de Fier	30	7	3	20	41	93	−52	24	
14	Viitorul Negomir	30	7	2	21	47	108	−61	23	
15	Știința Hurezani (R)	30	4	5	21	51	109	−58	17	Relegation to Liga V Gorj
16	Petrolul Stoina (R)	30	3	4	23	33	99	−66	13	Relegation to Liga V Gorj

Rules for classification: 1) Points; 2) Head-to-head points; 3) Head-to-head goal difference; 4) Head-to-head goals scored; 5) Head-to-head away goals scored; 6) Goal difference; 7) Goals scored.
(C) Champions; (Q) Qualified for the phase indicated; (R) Relegated

=== Harghita County ===
Team changes from the previous season

- Farkaslaka Lupeni (Odorhei Zone winners) and Ezüstfenyő Ciceu (Ciuc Zone winners) declined promotion from Liga V Harghita.
- Csíkszereda Miercurea Ciuc II, MÜ Frumoasa and Délhegy Ciumani withdrew.
- CS Gheorgheni was admitted upon request.

Pos	Team	Pld	W	D	L	GF	GA	GD	Pts	Qualification or relegation
1	Unirea Cristuru Secuiesc (C, Q)	24	19	1	4	89	25	+64	58	Qualification to promotion play-off
2	Minerul Bălan	24	16	2	6	66	32	+34	50	
3	Pro Mureșul Toplița	24	14	1	9	78	42	+36	43	
4	Gheorgheni	24	10	1	13	56	74	−18	31	
5	Roseal Odorheiu Secuiesc	24	7	5	12	41	75	−34	26	
6	Homorod Merești	24	5	3	16	37	77	−40	18	
7	Bastya Lăzarea	24	4	5	15	36	78	−42	17	
8	Tulgheș (D)	0	0	0	0	0	0	0	0	Excluded

Rules for classification: 1) Points; 2) Head-to-head points; 3) Head-to-head goal difference; 4) Head-to-head goals scored; 5) Head-to-head away goals scored; 6) Goal difference; 7) Goals scored.
(C) Champions; (D) Disqualified; (Q) Qualified for the phase indicated

=== Hunedoara County ===
Team changes from the previous season

- Dacia Orăștie (winners) was promoted from Liga V Hunedoara.
- Măgura Pui (runners-up) declined promotion from Liga V Hunedoara.
- Metalul Crișcior withdrew.
- Gloria Geoagiu, Cetate Deva II and CSM Vulcan were admitted upon request.

Pos	Team	Pld	W	D	L	GF	GA	GD	Pts	Qualification or relegation
1	Hunedoara (C, Q)	28	25	2	1	141	18	+123	77	Qualification to promotion play-off
2	Inter Petrila	28	21	2	5	112	28	+84	65	
3	Victoria Călan	28	18	3	7	57	47	+10	57	
4	Șoimul Băița	28	15	9	4	73	31	+42	54	
5	Gloria Geoagiu	28	16	2	10	63	31	+32	50	
6	Hercules Lupeni	28	14	6	8	93	40	+53	48	
7	Aurul Brad	28	13	4	11	64	47	+17	43	
8	Dacia Orăștie	28	13	2	13	61	56	+5	41 (Note: Dacia–Vulcan 4–0; Vulcan–Dacia 2–0.)	
9	CSM Vulcan	28	12	5	11	46	48	−2	41	
10	Retezatul Hațeg	28	13	1	14	61	74	−13	40	
11	Aurul Certej	28	9	4	15	46	80	−34	31	
12	Jiul Petroșani	28	6	4	18	33	85	−52	22	
13	Minerul Uricani	28	5	1	22	29	125	−96	16	
14	Universitatea Petroșani (R)	28	4	2	22	25	96	−71	14	Relegation to Liga V Hunedoara
15	Cetate Deva II (R)	28	1	3	24	24	122	−98	6	Relegation to Liga V Hunedoara

Rules for classification: 1) Points; 2) Head-to-head points; 3) Head-to-head goal difference; 4) Head-to-head goals scored; 5) Head-to-head away goals scored; 6) Goal difference; 7) Goals scored.
(C) Champions; (Q) Qualified for the phase indicated; (R) Relegated

=== Ialomița County ===
Team changes from the previous season

- Recolta Bărcănești (13th place), Voința Maia (14th place), FC Traian (15th place) and Fulgerul Fierbinți (16th place) were relegated to Liga V Ialomița.
- Spartacus Iazu (Series I winners), Olimpia Rădulești (Series II winners), Unirea Scânteia (Series I runners-up) and FC Urziceni (Series II runners-up) were promoted from Liga V Ialomița.

Pos	Team	Pld	W	D	L	GF	GA	GD	Pts	Qualification or relegation
1	Abatorul Slobozia (C, Q)	30	25	1	4	123	27	+96	76	Qualification to promotion play-off
2	Recolta Gheorghe Doja	30	23	3	4	115	49	+66	72	
3	Viitorul Axintele	30	18	7	5	91	44	+47	61	
4	Victoria Munteni-Buzău	30	18	4	8	79	48	+31	58	
5	Urziceni	30	15	5	10	75	45	+30	50	
6	Bărăganul Ciulnița	30	14	6	10	78	60	+18	48	
7	Recolta Gheorghe Lazăr	30	14	4	12	75	85	−10	46	
8	Victoria Țăndărei	30	14	2	14	59	56	+3	44	
9	Secunda Adâncata	30	13	4	13	65	55	+10	43	
10	Unirea Ion Roată	30	14	3	13	87	76	+11	42 (Note: Unirea Ion Roată deducted 3 points.)	
11	Amara	30	10	9	11	63	61	+2	38 (Note: Amara deducted 1 point.)	
12	Spartacus Iazu	30	9	3	18	83	107	−24	30	
13	Olimpia Rădulești (O)	30	9	1	20	66	115	−49	22 (Note: Olimpia Rădulești and Spicul Colilia were deducted 6 points.)	Qualification to relegation play-out
14	Rapid Fetești (R)	30	6	3	21	34	81	−47	21 (Note: Rapid Fetești withdrew after 15 rounds, lost all matches in the second half 0–3, and was relegated.)	Relegation to Liga V Ialomița
15	Unirea Scânteia (O)	30	5	3	22	72	154	−82	18	Qualification to relegation play-out
16	Spicul Colilia (R)	30	3	2	25	48	150	−102	5	Relegation to Liga V Ialomița

Rules for classification: 1) Points; 2) Head-to-head points; 3) Head-to-head goal difference; 4) Head-to-head goals scored; 5) Head-to-head away goals scored; 6) Goal difference; 7) Goals scored.
(C) Champions; (O) Play-off winners; (Q) Qualified for the phase indicated; (R) Relegated
Notes:

Relegation play-out

The 13th and 15th-placed teams of the Liga IV faces the 2nd placed teams from the two series of Liga V Ialomița.

Team 1	Score	Team 2
Unirea Scânteia	3–1	Agronomia Bucu
Olimpia Rădulești	3–2	Voința Maia

=== Iași County ===
Team changes from the previous season

- Olimpia Popricani (14th place) and Venus Butea (16th place; withdrew) were relegated to Liga V Iași.
- Victoria Lețcani (Series II winners) and Moldova Cristești (Series III runners-up and promotion play-offs winners) (Note: Moldova Cristești won the runners-up promotion play-off, after 3–2 vs. Prutul Prisăcani and 1–1 vs. Gloria Românești (final table: Moldova 4 pts, 4–3; Gloria Românești 2 pts, 2–2; Prutul Prisăcani 1 pt, 3–4).) were promoted from Liga V Iași.
- Avântul Golăiești (Series I winners) and Biruința Miroslovești (Series III winners) declined promotion from Liga V Iași.
- Gloria Balș (13th place) and Voința Moțca (15th place) were spared from relegation.

Pos	Team	Pld	W	D	L	GF	GA	GD	Pts	Qualification or relegation
1	Victoria Lețcani (C, Q)	30	27	2	1	114	22	+92	83	Qualification to promotion play-off
2	Unirea Mircești	30	24	4	2	112	15	+97	76	
3	Unirea Ruginoasa	30	21	7	2	95	29	+66	70	
4	Flacăra Erbiceni	30	18	6	6	81	48	+33	60	
5	Unirea Scânteia	30	14	3	13	53	61	−8	45	
6	Tomești	30	14	2	14	49	46	+3	44	
7	Steaua Magică Iași	30	13	4	13	58	56	+2	43	
8	Gloria Bălțați	30	13	3	14	58	56	+2	42	
9	Stejarul Sinești	30	11	6	13	49	55	−6	39 (Note: Viitorul Hârlau–Stejarul Sinești 2–0; Stejarul Sinești–Viitorul Hârlau 2–0.)	
10	Viitorul Hârlau	30	12	3	15	45	54	−9	39	
11	Moldova Cristești	30	11	5	14	64	64	0	38	
12	Stejarul Bârnova	30	11	4	15	62	79	−17	37	
13	Ciurea	30	10	2	18	57	89	−32	32	
14	Viitorul Lungani (R)	30	6	4	20	30	80	−50	22	Relegation to Liga V Iași
15	Voința Moțca (R)	30	4	1	25	35	119	−84	13	Relegation to Liga V Iași
16	Gloria Balș (R)	30	2	2	26	16	105	−89	8	Relegation to Liga V Iași

Rules for classification: 1) Points; 2) Head-to-head points; 3) Head-to-head goal difference; 4) Head-to-head goals scored; 5) Head-to-head away goals scored; 6) Goal difference; 7) Goals scored.
(C) Champions; (Q) Qualified for the phase indicated; (R) Relegated

=== Ilfov County ===
Team changes from the previous season

- Sportul Ciorogârla was renamed CS Ciorogârla.
- CS Măgurele was reinstated after having withdrawn in the previous season.
- Unirea Dobroești and Frăția București were admitted upon request.
- FC Chitila, CS Glina, FC 1 Decembrie, Victoria Tânganu, Codrii Vlăsiei Moara Vlăsiei, Voința Crevedia and Voința Crevedia II withdrew.

Series I

Pos	Team	Pld	W	D	L	GF	GA	GD	Pts	Qualification or relegation
1	Bragadiru (Q)	20	16	4	0	79	22	+57	52	Qualification to championship final
2	Voluntari III	20	15	2	3	86	28	+58	47	
3	Viitorul Berceni	20	14	1	5	65	46	+19	43	
4	Athletico Floreasca	20	13	2	5	79	39	+40	41	
5	Ciorogârla	20	9	4	7	40	41	−1	31	
6	Periș	20	8	1	11	52	50	+2	25 (Note: Unirea Dobroești–Periș 0–3; Periș–Unirea Dobroești 7–1.)	
7	Unirea Dobroești	20	7	4	9	47	54	−7	25	
8	Măgurele	20	4	4	12	45	72	−27	16	
9	Voința Buftea (R)	20	4	2	14	37	78	−41	14	Relegation to Liga V Ilfov
10	Metalplast Jilava (R)	20	3	3	14	35	73	−38	12	Relegation to Liga V Ilfov
11	Viitorul Domnești II (R)	20	3	1	16	27	89	−62	10	Relegation to Liga V Ilfov

Rules for classification: 1) Points; 2) Head-to-head points; 3) Head-to-head goal difference; 4) Head-to-head goals scored; 5) Head-to-head away goals scored; 6) Goal difference; 7) Goals scored.
(Q) Qualified for the phase indicated; (R) Relegated
Notes:

Series II

Pos	Team	Pld	W	D	L	GF	GA	GD	Pts	Qualification or relegation
1	Viitorul Pantelimon (Q)	20	15	4	1	61	23	+38	49	Qualification to championship final
2	Cornetu	20	15	2	3	58	16	+42	47	
3	Viitorul Dragomirești-Vale	20	15	1	4	89	42	+47	46	
4	Pescărușul Grădiștea	20	13	2	5	86	40	+46	41	
5	Vulturii Pasărea	20	11	2	7	66	46	+20	35	
6	Viitorul Petrăchioaia	20	10	0	10	41	43	−2	30	
7	Gloria Islaz	20	8	2	10	60	65	−5	26	
8	Speranța Săbăreni (R)	20	6	1	13	36	56	−20	19	Relegation to Liga V Ilfov
9	Gloria Buriaș (R)	20	3	2	15	37	96	−59	11	Relegation to Liga V Ilfov
10	Viitorul Găneasa (R)	20	3	0	17	41	99	−58	9	Relegation to Liga V Ilfov
11	Frăția București (R)	20	2	2	16	21	70	−49	8	Relegation to Liga V Ilfov
12	Dărăști (D)	0	0	0	0	0	0	0	0 (Note: Dărăști did not show up in the first two rounds and was excluded from the championship.)	Excluded

Rules for classification: 1) Points; 2) Head-to-head points; 3) Head-to-head goal difference; 4) Head-to-head goals scored; 5) Head-to-head away goals scored; 6) Goal difference; 7) Goals scored.
(D) Disqualified; (Q) Qualified for the phase indicated; (R) Relegated
Notes:

Championship final

Team 1	Agg.	Team 2	1st leg	2nd leg
Viitorul Pantelimon	0–6	Bragadiru	0–1	0–5

Bragadiru won the Liga IV Ilfov County and qualified for the promotion play-off in Liga III.

=== Maramureș County ===
Team changes from the previous season

- Viitorul Ulmeni withdrew from Liga III and joined Liga IV Maramureș.
- Viitorul Culcea-Săcălășeni (Series I winners) and Rapid Satu Nou de Sus (Series II winners) declined promotion from Liga V Maramureș.
- CSO Borșa, Gloria Chechiș and Minerul Cavnic withdrew.
- Minaur Baia Mare, Luceafărul Strâmtura, Bradul Groșii Țibleșului and FC Suciu de Sus were admitted upon request.

South Series

Pos	Team	Pld	W	D	L	GF	GA	GD	Pts	Qualification
1	Minaur Baia Mare (Q)	20	18	1	1	106	10	+96	55	Qualification to championship final
2	Fărcașa	20	15	2	3	64	33	+31	47	
3	Lăpușul Târgu Lăpuș	20	14	4	2	84	16	+68	46	
4	Progresul Șomcuta Mare	20	13	4	3	77	38	+39	43	
5	Viitorul Ulmeni	20	9	1	10	37	48	−11	28	
6	Progresul Dumbrăvița	20	7	3	10	39	47	−8	24	
7	Suciu de Sus	20	7	2	11	35	51	−16	23	
8	Bradul Groșii Țibleșului	20	6	1	13	36	56	−20	19	
9	Unirea Șișești	20	5	1	14	26	69	−43	16	
10	Comuna Satulung	20	4	1	15	27	79	−52	13	
11	Seini	20	2	0	18	21	105	−84	6	

Rules for classification: 1) Points; 2) Head-to-head points; 3) Head-to-head goal difference; 4) Head-to-head goals scored; 5) Head-to-head away goals scored; 6) Goal difference; 7) Goals scored.
(Q) Qualified for the phase indicated

North Series

Pos	Team	Pld	W	D	L	GF	GA	GD	Pts	Qualification
1	Bradul Vișeu de Sus (Q)	20	17	3	0	90	11	+79	54	Qualification to championship final
2	Recolta Săliștea de Sus	20	14	1	5	80	45	+35	43	
3	Avântul Bârsana	20	13	2	5	104	50	+54	41	
4	Zorile Moisei	20	11	6	3	48	28	+20	39	
5	Plimob Sighetu Marmației	20	12	2	6	63	49	+14	38	
6	Remeți	20	6	5	9	42	54	−12	23	
7	Foresta Câmpulung la Tisa	20	6	3	11	37	62	−25	21	
8	Metalul Bogdan Vodă	20	5	5	10	34	58	−24	20	
9	Iza Dragomirești	20	4	5	11	46	65	−19	17	
10	Salina Ocna Șugatag	20	4	4	12	33	53	−20	16	
11	Luceafărul Strâmtura	20	0	0	20	17	119	−102	0	

Rules for classification: 1) Points; 2) Head-to-head points; 3) Head-to-head goal difference; 4) Head-to-head goals scored; 5) Head-to-head away goals scored; 6) Goal difference; 7) Goals scored.
(Q) Qualified for the phase indicated

Championship final

The matches were played on 10 and 16 June 2018.

Team 1	Agg.	Team 2	1st leg	2nd leg
Bradul Vișeu de Sus	0–11	Minaur Baia Mare	0–4	0–7

Minaur Baia Mare won the Liga IV Maramureș County and qualified for the promotion play-off in Liga III.

=== Mehedinți County ===
Team changes from the previous season

- Real Vânju Mare (runners-up) was promoted from Liga V Mehedinți.
- Dunărea Hinova (winners) declined promotion from Liga V Mehedinți.
- FC Drobeta 2013 withdrew.
- Decebal Eșelnița and Inter Salcia were admitted upon request.

Pos	Team	Pld	W	D	L	GF	GA	GD	Pts	Qualification or relegation
1	Recolta Dănceu	18	16	1	1	81	21	+60	49	Qualification to championship play-off
2	Viitorul Șimian	18	16	0	2	72	14	+58	48	Qualification to championship play-off
3	Strehaia	18	14	2	2	63	18	+45	44	Qualification to championship play-off
4	Dierna Orșova	18	10	1	7	48	35	+13	31	Qualification to championship play-off
5	Viitorul Cujmir	18	9	1	8	45	39	+6	28	Qualification to championship play-out
6	Dunărea Pristol	18	6	3	9	31	44	−13	21	Qualification to championship play-out
7	Real Vânju Mare	18	5	1	12	23	52	−29	16	Qualification to championship play-out
8	Inter Salcia	18	3	2	13	20	74	−54	11	Qualification to championship play-out
9	Decebal Eșelnița	18	2	4	12	26	73	−47	10	Qualification to championship play-out
10	Corcova (D)	18	1	1	16	12	51	−39	4 (Note: Corcova was excluded from the championship after ten rounds and lost all remaining matches with 0–3.)	Excluded

Rules for classification: 1) Points; 2) Head-to-head points; 3) Head-to-head goal difference; 4) Head-to-head goals scored; 5) Head-to-head away goals scored; 6) Goal difference; 7) Goals scored.
(D) Disqualified
Notes:

Championship play-off

Pos	Team	Pld	W	D	L	GF	GA	GD	Pts	Qualification
1	Viitorul Șimian (C, Q)	6	3	3	0	20	5	+15	36	Qualification to promotion play-off
2	Recolta Dănceu	6	3	1	2	11	10	+1	35	
3	Strehaia	6	3	2	1	8	6	+2	33	
4	Dierna Orșova	6	0	0	6	4	22	−18	16	

Rules for classification: 1) Points; 2) Head-to-head points; 3) Head-to-head goal difference; 4) Head-to-head goals scored; 5) Head-to-head away goals scored; 6) Goal difference; 7) Goals scored.
(C) Champions; (Q) Qualified for the phase indicated

Championship play-out

Pos	Team	Pld	W	D	L	GF	GA	GD	Pts
5	Real Vânju Mare	8	5	1	2	27	17	+10	24
6	Viitorul Cujmir	8	3	0	5	15	25	−10	23
7	Dunărea Pristol	8	3	1	4	22	21	+1	21
8	Inter Salcia	8	4	0	4	18	17	+1	18
9	Decebal Eșelnița	8	4	0	4	20	22	−2	17

Rules for classification: 1) Points; 2) Head-to-head points; 3) Head-to-head goal difference; 4) Head-to-head goals scored; 5) Head-to-head away goals scored; 6) Goal difference; 7) Goals scored.

=== Mureș County ===
Team changes from the previous season

- Viitorul Aluniș (North Series winners), Farel Roteni (Central Series winners) and Real Valea Largă (South Series winners) declined promotion from Liga V Mureș.
- Juvenes Târgu Mureș and Târnava Mică Sângeorgiu de Pădure withdrew.
- Rază de Soare Acățari was spared from relegation.
- Unirea Tricolor Târnăveni was admitted upon request.
- Avântul Miheșu de Câmpie, which had withdrawn during the previous season, was readmitted.
- Lacul Ursu Mobila Sovata was renamed ACS Sovata.

Pos	Team	Pld	W	D	L	GF	GA	GD	Pts	Qualification or relegation
1	MSE 08 Târgu Mureș (C, Q)	28	23	4	1	139	27	+112	73	Qualification to promotion play-off
2	Mureșul Luduș	28	22	3	3	94	26	+68	69	
3	Mureșul Rușii-Munți	28	22	2	4	108	32	+76	68	
4	Sovata	28	20	2	6	82	44	+38	62	
5	Atletic Târgu Mureș	28	14	5	9	81	45	+36	47	
6	Gaz Metan Târgu Mureș	28	14	5	9	68	52	+16	47	
7	Miercurea Nirajului	28	13	4	11	76	59	+17	43	
8	Viitorul Ungheni	28	11	5	12	79	80	−1	38	
9	Rază de Soare Acățari	28	9	6	13	46	51	−5	33	
10	Unirea Tricolor Târnăveni	28	9	4	15	59	87	−28	31	
11	Mureșul Nazna	28	7	3	18	45	96	−51	24	
12	Mureșul Cuci	28	7	2	19	57	103	−46	23	
13	Sărmașu	28	5	4	19	42	113	−71	19	
14	Gaz Metan Daneș	28	4	3	21	37	129	−92	15	
15	Avântul Miheșu de Câmpie (R)	28	4	0	24	22	91	−69	12	Relegation to Liga V Mureș

Rules for classification: 1) Points; 2) Head-to-head points; 3) Head-to-head goal difference; 4) Head-to-head goals scored; 5) Head-to-head away goals scored; 6) Goal difference; 7) Goals scored.
(C) Champions; (Q) Qualified for the phase indicated; (R) Relegated

=== Neamț County ===
Team changes from the previous season

- Tineretul Cândești (11th place; withdrew), Unirea Tămășeni (12th place; withdrew), Voința Dobreni (13th place; withdrew), Zimbrul Pâncești (15th place; withdrew) and LPS Roman (16th place; withdrew) were relegated to Liga V Neamț.
- Ceahlăul Piatra Neamț (Series II winners) was promoted from Liga V Neamț.
- Siretul Doljești (Series I winners) declined promotion from Liga V Neamț.
- Teiul Poiana Teiului, Bradul Roznov, Vulturul Costișa, and LPS Piatra Neamț withdrew.

Pos	Team	Pld	W	D	L	GF	GA	GD	Pts	Qualification
1	Ceahlăul Piatra Neamț	16	14	1	1	66	11	+55	43	Qualification to championship play-off
2	Bradu Borca	16	11	3	2	43	21	+22	36	Qualification to championship play-off
3	Cimentul Bicaz	16	10	1	5	47	27	+20	31	Qualification to championship play-off
4	Victoria Horia	16	9	3	4	28	21	+7	30 (Note: Speranța Răucești–Victoria Horia 0–2; Victoria Horia –Speranța Răucești 1–0.)	Qualification to championship play-off
5	Speranța Răucești	16	10	0	6	36	28	+8	30	
6	Voința Ion Creangă	16	6	0	10	34	33	+1	18	
7	Moldova Cordun	16	4	3	9	30	64	−34	15	
8	Steel Man Târgu Neamț	15	1	1	13	8	47	−39	4 (Note: Steel Man Târgu Neamț withdrew after the second half and was awarded 0–3 losses for all remaining matches.)	
9	Zimbrul Vânători-Neamț	15	0	0	15	8	48	−40	0 (Note: Zimbrul Vânători-Neamț withdrew after the first half and was awarded 0–3 losses for all remaining matches.)	

Rules for classification: 1) Points; 2) Head-to-head points; 3) Head-to-head goal difference; 4) Head-to-head goals scored; 5) Head-to-head away goals scored; 6) Goal difference; 7) Goals scored.
Notes:

Championship play-off

The championship play-off was played in a double round-robin format between the best four teams of the regular season. The teams started with half of the points accumulated during the regular season.

Pos	Team	Pld	W	D	L	GF	GA	GD	Pts	Qualification
1	Ceahlăul Piatra Neamț (C, Q)	6	4	1	1	14	3	+11	35	Qualification to promotion play-off
2	Bradu Borca	6	4	2	0	12	7	+5	32	
3	Cimentul Bicaz	6	1	0	5	11	18	−7	19	
4	Victoria Horia	6	1	1	4	10	19	−9	19	

Rules for classification: 1) Points; 2) Head-to-head points; 3) Head-to-head goal difference; 4) Head-to-head goals scored; 5) Head-to-head away goals scored; 6) Goal difference; 7) Goals scored.
(C) Champions; (Q) Qualified for the phase indicated

=== Olt County ===
Team changes from the previous season

- AS Milcov achieved promotion to Liga III.
- Victoria Dobrun (16th place; withdrew) was relegated to Liga V Olt.
- Juventus Slatina, CSȘ Slatina and Romanați Caracal withdrew.
- Viitorul Osica de Jos was admitted upon request.
- Recolta Stoicănești was readmitted after withdrawing during the previous season.
- Avântul Oporelu (Series I winners), AS Voineasa (Series II winners), Valea Oltului Ipotești (Series III winners), Victoria Cezieni (Series IV winners), and Oltul Izbiceni (Series V winners) declined promotion from Liga V Olt.

Pos	Team	Pld	W	D	L	GF	GA	GD	Pts	Qualification or relegation
1	Vedița Colonești (C, Q)	22	20	0	2	103	21	+82	60	Qualification to promotion play-off
2	Petrolul Potcoava	22	15	1	6	67	30	+37	46	
3	Oltul Curtișoara	22	13	3	6	49	25	+24	42	
4	Voința Băbiciu	22	12	3	7	50	27	+23	39	
5	Viitorul Grădinile	22	13	0	9	55	54	+1	39	
6	Vedea Văleni Nicolae Titulescu	22	11	4	7	75	38	+37	37	
7	Oltețul Osica	22	8	2	12	36	70	−34	26	
8	Viitorul Osica de Jos	22	8	1	13	47	61	−14	25	
9	Viitorul Rusănești	22	7	2	13	34	56	−22	23	
10	Olt Scornicești	22	7	1	14	42	69	−27	22	
11	Recolta Stoicănești	22	3	5	14	28	73	−45	14	
12	Avântul Coteana	22	3	2	17	19	81	−62	11	

Rules for classification: 1) Points; 2) Head-to-head points; 3) Head-to-head goal difference; 4) Head-to-head goals scored; 5) Head-to-head away goals scored; 6) Goal difference; 7) Goals scored.
(C) Champions; (Q) Qualified for the phase indicated

=== Prahova County ===
Team changes from the previous season

- Petrolul Ploiești achieved promotion to Liga III.
- Petrolistul Boldești was relegated from Liga III.
- Unirea Cocorăștii Colț (16th place) was relegated to Liga V Prahova.
- Măgura Trestioara (runners-up) was promoted from Liga V Prahova.
- Real Rio Cocoșești (Liga V Prahova winners) ceded its place to Petrolul 95 Ploiești.
- Petrolul Băicoi and Tufeni Băicoi withdrew.
- Măgura Trestioara merged with CSO Slănic to form Măgura Slănic.

Pos	Team	Pld	W	D	L	GF	GA	GD	Pts	Qualification or relegation
1	Blejoi (C, Q)	30	26	3	1	107	21	+86	81	Qualification to promotion play-off
2	Păulești	30	22	4	4	92	27	+65	70	
3	Bănești-Urleta	30	19	4	7	78	41	+37	61	
4	Petrolistul Boldești	30	18	6	6	74	32	+42	60	
5	Teleajenul Vălenii de Munte	30	17	3	10	62	43	+19	54	
6	Cornu	30	15	6	9	65	52	+13	51	
7	Avântul Măneciu	30	15	5	10	71	50	+21	50	
8	Tricolorul Breaza	30	14	6	10	60	42	+18	48	
9	Plopeni	30	13	3	14	49	50	−1	42	
10	Unirea Urlați	30	12	3	15	41	53	−12	39	
11	Petrolul 95 Ploiești	30	10	4	16	45	66	−21	34	
12	Brebu	30	8	5	17	43	72	−29	29	
13	Mănești 2013 Coada Izvorului	30	6	4	20	40	76	−36	22	
14	Ceptura	30	7	1	22	45	111	−66	22	
15	Unirea Teleajen Ploiești (R)	30	6	3	21	39	102	−63	21	Relegation to Liga V Prahova
16	Măgura Slănic (R)	30	1	2	27	12	85	−73	5 (Note: Măgura Slănic withdrew after 15 rounds and lost all matches from the second half of the season 0–3.)	Relegation to Liga V Prahova

Rules for classification: 1) Points; 2) Head-to-head points; 3) Head-to-head goal difference; 4) Head-to-head goals scored; 5) Head-to-head away goals scored; 6) Goal difference; 7) Goals scored.
(C) Champions; (Q) Qualified for the phase indicated; (R) Relegated

=== Satu Mare County ===
Team changes from the previous season

- Unirea Tășnad achieved promotion to Liga III.
- Recolta Dorolț was relegated from Liga III.
- Victoria Apa (11th place) and Viitorul Vetiș (12th place) were relegated to Liga V Satu Mare.
- Dari Lipău (Series A winners) and Voinţa Babța (Series B winners) were promoted from Liga V Satu Mare.
- Luceafărul Decebal withdrew.
- FC Certeze was admitted upon request.
- Recolta Dorolț II was demoted as the second team after its first team was relegated from Liga III.

Pos	Team	Pld	W	D	L	GF	GA	GD	Pts	Qualification or relegation
1	Energia Negrești-Oaș (C, Q)	20	15	3	2	52	19	+33	48	Qualification to promotion play-off
2	Crasna Moftinu Mic	20	14	5	1	50	13	+37	47	
3	Știința Beltiug	20	14	2	4	59	35	+24	44	
4	Talna Orașu Nou	20	12	1	7	58	28	+30	37	
5	Victoria Carei	20	10	2	8	40	29	+11	32	
6	Recolta Dorolț	20	8	6	6	42	26	+16	30	
7	Turul Micula	20	7	7	6	53	35	+18	28	
8	Voința Babța	20	8	2	10	49	48	+1	26	
9	Voința Doba	20	4	1	15	33	75	−42	13	
10	Certeze	20	2	2	16	18	82	−64	8	
11	Dari Lipău	20	0	1	19	10	74	−64	1	

Rules for classification: 1) Points; 2) Head-to-head points; 3) Head-to-head goal difference; 4) Head-to-head goals scored; 5) Head-to-head away goals scored; 6) Goal difference; 7) Goals scored.
(C) Champions; (Q) Qualified for the phase indicated

=== Sălaj County ===
Team changes from the previous season

- Inter Pericei (15th place) and Gloria Bobota (16th place; withdrew) were relegated to Liga V Sălaj.
- Olimpia Rus (East Series winners) and Unirea Hereclean (West Series runners-up) declined promotion from Liga V Sălaj.

Pos	Team	Pld	W	D	L	GF	GA	GD	Pts	Qualification or relegation
1	Unirea Mirșid (C, Q)	26	23	1	2	144	27	+117	70	Qualification to promotion play-off
2	Rapid Jibou	26	23	0	3	137	33	+104	69	
3	Dumbrava Gâlgău Almașului	26	22	2	2	132	24	+108	68	
4	Barcău Nușfalău	26	16	2	8	114	51	+63	50	
5	Sportul Șimleu Silvaniei	26	14	3	9	91	53	+38	45	
6	Real Crișeni	26	14	0	12	73	53	+20	42	
7	Crasna	26	10	5	11	57	77	−20	35	
8	Olimpic Bocșa	26	11	1	14	68	95	−27	34	
9	Cetatea Buciumi	26	6	5	15	54	67	−13	23	
10	Benfica Ileanda	26	5	8	13	44	85	−41	23	
11	Silvania Cehu Silvaniei	26	6	4	16	48	102	−54	22	
12	Flacara Halmâșd	26	6	4	16	41	102	−61	22	
13	Chieșd (R)	26	6	1	19	44	125	−81	19	Relegation to Liga V Sălaj
14	Hida (R)	26	1	2	23	31	184	−153	5	Relegation to Liga V Sălaj

Rules for classification: 1) Points; 2) Head-to-head points; 3) Head-to-head goal difference; 4) Head-to-head goals scored; 5) Head-to-head away goals scored; 6) Goal difference; 7) Goals scored.
(C) Champions; (Q) Qualified for the phase indicated; (R) Relegated

=== Sibiu County ===
Team changes from the previous season

- FC Avrig achieved promotion to Liga III.
- FC Hermannstadt II was enrolled upon request in Liga III.
- Sion Săliște (14th place) and Continental Sibiu (15th place) were relegated to Liga V Sibiu.
- Spicul Șeica Mare (Sibiu Series I winners) and AS Copșa Mică (Mediaș Series I winners) were promoted from Liga V Sibiu.
- Corsav Veștem (Sibiu Series II winners) and Stăruința Laslea (Mediaș Series II winners) declined promotion Liga V Sibiu.
- AS Bradu was admitted upon request.

Pos	Team	Pld	W	D	L	GF	GA	GD	Pts	Qualification or relegation
1	Păltiniș Rășinari (C, Q)	26	24	1	1	114	27	+87	73	Qualification to promotion play-off
2	Viitorul Șelimbăr	26	21	3	2	100	19	+81	66	
3	Unirea Miercurea Sibiului	26	15	6	5	76	38	+38	51	
4	Măgura Cisnădie	26	14	5	7	69	34	+35	47	
5	Sparta Mediaș	26	14	1	11	78	65	+13	43	
6	Agnita	26	13	2	11	59	53	+6	41	
7	Progresul Terezian Sibiu	26	11	3	12	67	73	−6	36	
8	Voința Sibiu	26	11	2	13	59	76	−17	35	
9	Bradu	26	10	3	13	56	66	−10	33	
10	Spicul Șeica Mare	26	10	2	14	52	61	−9	32	
11	Copșa Mică	26	7	6	13	59	78	−19	27	
12	Tălmaciu (R)	26	4	5	17	38	71	−33	17	Relegation to Liga V Sibiu
13	ASA Sibiu (R)	26	5	0	21	49	136	−87	15	Relegation to Liga V Sibiu
14	Athletic Șura Mare (R)	26	3	1	22	43	122	−79	10	Relegation to Liga V Sibiu

Rules for classification: 1) Points; 2) Head-to-head points; 3) Head-to-head goal difference; 4) Head-to-head goals scored; 5) Head-to-head away goals scored; 6) Goal difference; 7) Goals scored.
(C) Champions; (Q) Qualified for the phase indicated; (R) Relegated

=== Suceava County ===
Team changes from the previous season

- Bucovina Rădăuți achieved promotion to Liga III
- Bradul Putna (13th place) and Avântul Volovăț (14th place) were relegated to Liga V Suceava.
- Releul Mihoveni (Series I winners), Voința Zvoriștea (Series II winners) and Dorna Vatra Dornei (Series III winners) declined promotion from Liga V Suceava.
- Forestierul Frumosu withdrew.
- Siretul Dolhasca, Juniorul Suceava, Zimbrul Siret and FC Pojorâta were admitted upon request.

Pos	Team	Pld	W	D	L	GF	GA	GD	Pts	Qualification or relegation
1	Șomuz Fălticeni (C, Q)	26	21	2	3	107	21	+86	65	Qualification to promotion play-off
2	Viitorul Liteni	26	19	2	5	80	29	+51	59	
3	Progresul Frătăuții Vechi	26	17	2	7	67	23	+44	53	
4	Siretul Dolhasca	26	16	3	7	74	45	+29	51	
5	Juniorul Suceava	26	14	6	6	61	34	+27	48	
6	Zimbrul Siret	26	11	5	10	42	47	−5	38	
7	Victoria Vatra Moldoviței	26	11	5	10	46	53	−7	38	
8	Șomuzul Preutești	26	11	4	11	56	51	+5	37	
9	Pojorâta	26	10	2	14	56	54	+2	32	
10	Moldova Drăgușeni	26	9	4	13	52	47	+5	31	
11	Foresta Suceava II	26	8	1	17	36	67	−31	25	
12	Stejarul Cajvana	26	7	1	18	43	80	−37	22	
13	Gura Humorului (R)	26	3	4	19	24	76	−52	13	Relegation to Liga V Suceava
14	Recolta Fântânele (R)	26	4	1	21	28	145	−117	13	Relegation to Liga V Suceava

Rules for classification: 1) Points; 2) Head-to-head points; 3) Head-to-head goal difference; 4) Head-to-head goals scored; 5) Head-to-head away goals scored; 6) Goal difference; 7) Goals scored.
(C) Champions; (Q) Qualified for the phase indicated; (R) Relegated

=== Teleorman County ===
Team changes from the previous season

- Voința Saelele achieved promotion to Liga III.
- Unirea Brânceni (9th place; withdrew) was relegated to Liga V Teleorman.
- FCM Alexandria II (Series I runners-up) (Note: Avântul Stejaru, the winners of Series I, was not eligible for promotion.) and Viitorul Butești (Series I 3rd place and promotion play-off winners) (Note: Viitorul Butești defeated Victoria Lunca 2–1, the runners-up of Series II, in the promotion play-off.) were promoted from Liga V Teleorman.
- Gloria Frumoasa (Liga V Teleorman Series II winners) gave up its spot to Dunărea Zimnicea.
- CS Nanov (15th place) was spared from relegation.

Pos	Team	Pld	W	D	L	GF	GA	GD	Pts	Qualification or relegation
1	Rapid Buzescu (C, Q)	28	24	3	1	136	23	+113	75	Qualification to promotion play-off
2	Astra Plosca	28	19	4	5	73	34	+39	61	
3	Dunărea Zimnicea	28	16	7	5	78	43	+35	55	
4	Metalul Peretu	28	16	5	7	76	52	+24	53	
5	Atletic Orbeasca	28	14	7	7	89	57	+32	49	
6	Drăgănești-Vlașca	28	14	5	9	65	49	+16	47	
7	Ajax Botoroaga	28	14	6	8	91	56	+35	44 (Note: Ajax Botoroaga, Seaca and Unirea Petrolul Videle were deducted 4 points.)	
8	Unirea Țigănești	28	13	3	12	83	51	+32	42	
9	Alexandria II	28	12	3	13	71	78	−7	39	
10	Seaca	28	12	5	11	79	72	+7	37	
11	Avântul Bragadiru	28	9	2	17	69	79	−10	29	
12	Nanov	28	8	3	17	47	95	−48	27	
13	Viitorul Butești	28	5	3	20	48	118	−70	18	
14	Tineretul Siliștea (R)	28	1	5	22	36	111	−75	8	Relegation to Liga V Teleorman
15	Unirea Petrolul Videle (R)	28	2	1	25	54	177	−123	3	Relegation to Liga V Teleorman
16	Viață Nouă Olteni (Note: Viață Nouă Olteni withdrew from the championship before the start of the season.) (R)	0	0	0	0	0	0	0	0	Withdrew

Rules for classification: 1) Points; 2) Head-to-head points; 3) Head-to-head goal difference; 4) Head-to-head goals scored; 5) Head-to-head away goals scored; 6) Goal difference; 7) Goals scored.
(C) Champions; (Q) Qualified for the phase indicated; (R) Relegated

=== Timiș County ===
Team changes from the previous season

- CS Ghiroda achieved promotion to Liga III.
- Unirea Tomnatic (Series I winners), ASO Deta (Series II winners) and FC Bazoșu Vechi (Series III winners) were promoted from Liga V Timiș.
- Unirea Banloc (17th place) and Marcel Băban Jimbolia (18th place; withdrew) were relegated to Liga V Timiș.
- AS Murani was renamed ACS Carani Murani.
- Arsenal Flacăra Făget was renamed CSO Făget.

Pos	Team	Pld	W	D	L	GF	GA	GD	Pts	Qualification or relegation
1	Dumbrăvița (C, Q)	34	28	5	1	125	25	+100	89	Qualification to promotion play-off
2	Timișul Șag	34	20	3	11	71	51	+20	63	
3	Deta	34	18	7	9	87	53	+34	61	
4	Unirea Sânnicolau Mare	34	17	7	10	67	39	+28	58	
5	Pobeda Dudeștii Vechi	34	18	4	12	82	66	+16	58	
6	Cocoșul Orțișoara	34	13	9	12	66	52	+14	48	
7	Voința Mașloc	34	13	8	13	59	63	−4	47	
8	Unirea Tomnatic	34	13	7	14	70	66	+4	46	
9	Progresul Ciacova	34	13	6	15	48	63	−15	45	
10	Peciu Nou	34	11	10	13	68	77	−9	43	
11	Seceani	34	11	9	14	58	87	−29	42	
12	Avântul Periam	34	13	2	19	55	70	−15	41	
13	Bazoșu Vechi	34	10	10	14	71	75	−4	40	
14	Lugoj II	34	12	4	18	68	87	−19	40	
15	Carani Murani	34	11	7	16	74	106	−32	40	
16	Făget (Note: Făget was spared from relegation due to the promotion of Dumbrăvița in Liga III.)	34	9	6	19	58	86	−28	33	Spared from relegation
17	Voința Biled (R)	34	8	8	18	63	99	−36	32	Relegation to Liga V Timiș
18	Progresul Gătaia (R)	34	7	10	17	54	79	−25	31	Relegation to Liga V Timiș

Rules for classification: 1) Points; 2) Head-to-head points; 3) Head-to-head goal difference; 4) Head-to-head goals scored; 5) Head-to-head away goals scored; 6) Goal difference; 7) Goals scored.
(C) Champions; (Q) Qualified for the phase indicated; (R) Relegated

=== Tulcea County ===
Team changes from the previous season

- Izbânda Mihail Kogălniceanu was renamed Flacăra Mihail Kogălniceanu.
- Racheta Dăeni was renamed AS Dăeni.
- Săgeata Stejaru was admitted upon request.
- Delta Stars Tulcea, Hamangia Baia, Heracleea Enisala, Viitorul Frecăței, Triumful Turda and Tractorul Horia withdrew.

Series A

Pos	Team	Pld	W	D	L	GF	GA	GD	Pts	Qualification or relegation
1	Șoimii Topolog	12	8	3	1	53	25	+28	27	Qualification to championship play-off
2	Arrubium Măcin	12	7	1	4	48	24	+24	22	Qualification to championship play-off
3	Luceafărul Slava Cercheză	12	6	2	4	34	24	+10	20	Qualification to championship play-off
4	Triumf Cerna	12	6	1	5	39	25	+14	19	Qualification to championship play-off
5	Beroe Ostrov	12	4	1	7	13	52	−39	13	
6	Național Somova	12	3	3	6	22	38	−16	12	
7	Sarica Niculițel	12	2	1	9	31	52	−21	7	
8	Dăeni (Note: Dăeni withdrew in the first half and all its results were canceled.) (D)	0	0	0	0	0	0	0	0	Withdrew

Rules for classification: 1) Points; 2) Head-to-head points; 3) Head-to-head goal difference; 4) Head-to-head goals scored; 5) Head-to-head away goals scored; 6) Goal difference; 7) Goals scored
(D) Disqualified
Notes:

Series B

Pos	Team	Pld	W	D	L	GF	GA	GD	Pts	Qualification or relegation
1	Pescărușul Sarichioi	14	11	2	1	112	14	+98	35	Qualification to championship play-off
2	Săgeata Stejaru	14	10	2	2	57	22	+35	32	Qualification to championship play-off
3	Delta Aegyssus Tulcea	14	9	3	2	78	19	+59	30	Qualification to championship play-off
4	Flacăra Mihail Kogălniceanu	14	8	2	4	52	24	+28	26	Qualification to championship play-off
5	Granitul Babadag	14	6	1	7	34	57	−23	19	
6	Egreta Sabangia	14	4	0	10	31	70	−39	12	
7	Laguna Ceamurlia de Jos	14	2	1	11	18	75	−57	7	
8	Gloria Agighiol	14	0	1	13	9	110	−101	1	

Rules for classification: 1) Points; 2) Head-to-head points; 3) Head-to-head goal difference; 4) Head-to-head goals scored; 5) Head-to-head away goals scored; 6) Goal difference; 7) Goals scored.

Championship play-off

Pos	Team	Pld	W	D	L	GF	GA	GD	Pts	Qualification
1	Pescărușul Sarichioi (C, Q)	12	10	1	1	47	14	+33	31	Qualification to promotion play-off
2	Delta Aegyssus Tulcea	12	8	2	2	39	16	+23	26	
3	Flacăra Mihail Kogălniceanu	12	5	1	6	18	23	−5	16	
4	Șoimii Topolog	12	5	0	7	25	27	−2	15	
5	Săgeata Stejaru	12	5	0	7	22	27	−5	15	
6	Luceafărul Slava Cercheză	12	3	2	7	17	37	−20	11	
7	Triumf Cerna	12	3	0	9	21	45	−24	9	
8	Arrubium Măcin (Note: Arrubium Măcin withdrew in the first half of the play-off and all its results were canceled.) (D)	0	0	0	0	0	0	0	0	Withdrew

Rules for classification: 1) Points; 2) Head-to-head points; 3) Head-to-head goal difference; 4) Head-to-head goals scored; 5) Head-to-head away goals scored; 6) Goal difference; 7) Goals scored.
(C) Champions; (D) Disqualified; (Q) Qualified for the phase indicated

=== Vaslui County ===
Team changes from the previous season

- Unirea Banca (9th place) and Flacăra Murgeni (10th place) were relegated to Liga V Vaslui.
- Flacăra Muntenii de Sus (winners), Racova Pușcași (runners-up) and Star Tătărani (3rd place) were promoted from Liga V Vaslui.
- Pajura Huși withdrew.
- Hușana Huși and FDR Tutova were admitted upon request.

Pos	Team	Pld	W	D	L	GF	GA	GD	Pts	Qualification or relegation
1	FC Vaslui	22	18	3	1	83	22	+61	57	Qualification to championship play-off
2	Hușana Huși	22	16	3	3	50	19	+31	51	Qualification to championship play-off
3	Flacăra Muntenii de Sus	22	14	4	4	44	24	+20	46	Qualification to championship play-off
4	Gârceni	22	12	4	6	59	28	+31	40	Qualification to championship play-off
5	Vitis Șuletea	22	13	1	8	67	46	+21	40	Qualification to championship play-off
6	Sporting Bârlad	22	10	3	9	57	42	+15	33	Qualification to championship play-off
7	Atletic Bârlad	22	8	6	8	50	34	+16	30	Qualification to championship play-off
8	Racova Pușcași	22	7	5	10	45	45	0	26	Qualification to championship play-off
9	Juventus Fălciu (O)	22	7	4	11	39	44	−5	25	Qualification to relegation play-out
10	Star Tătărani (R)	22	5	1	16	50	79	−29	16	Qualification to relegation play-out
11	Multim Perieni (R)	22	4	0	18	30	99	−69	12	Qualification to relegation play-out
12	FDR Tutova (R)	22	1	0	21	18	110	−92	3 (Note: FDR Tutova withdrew during the winter break, lost all remaining matches 0–3, and were relegated.)	Relegation to Liga V Vaslui

Rules for classification: 1) Points; 2) Head-to-head points; 3) Head-to-head goal difference; 4) Head-to-head goals scored; 5) Head-to-head away goals scored; 6) Goal difference; 7) Goals scored.
(O) Play-off winners; (R) Relegated
Notes:

Relegation play-out
First round

Team 1	Score	Team 2
Star Tătărani	w/o	Multim Perieni

Second round

Team 1	Score	Team 2
Juventus Fălciu	4–0	Multim Perieni

Promotion/relegation play-off

The losers of the second round of the Liga IV relegation play-out faced the 3rd-placed team from Liga V Vaslui.

Team 1	Score	Team 2
Moara Domnească	5–1	Multim Perieni

Championship play-off
Quarter-finals

Team 1	Score	Team 2
FC Vaslui	4–0	Racova Pușcași
Hușana Huși	3–1 (a.e.t.)	Atletic Bârlad
Flacăra Muntenii de Sus	5–2	Sporting Bârlad
Gârceni	2–1	Vitis Șuletea

Semi-finals

Team 1	Score	Team 2
Hușana Huși	0–1(a.e.t.)	Flacăra Muntenii de Sus
FC Vaslui	1–2 (a.e.t.)	Gârceni

Final

Team 1	Score	Team 2
Flacăra Muntenii de Sus	2–1	Gârceni

Flacăra Muntenii de Sus won the Liga IV Vaslui County and qualified for the promotion play-off in Liga III.

=== Vâlcea County ===
Team changes from the previous season

- FC Păușești Otăsău (11th place) were relegated to Liga V Vâlcea.
- Oltețul Alunu (West Series winners) and Oltețul Bălcești (West Series runners-up and promotion/relegation play-offs winners) were promoted from Liga V Vâlcea.
- Chimia 2012 Râmnicu Vâlcea (East Series winners) and Stejarul Vlădești (East Series runners-up and promotion/relegation play-offs winners) declined promotion from Liga V Vâlcea.
- Posada Perișani withdrew.
- Lotru Brezoi (9th place and promotion/relegation play-offs losers) and Minerul Costești (10th place and promotion/relegation play-offs losers) were spared from relegation.
- CSM Râmnicu Vâlcea withdrew from Liga II and was subsequently reorganized as SCM Râmnicu Vâlcea, enrolling in Liga IV Vâlcea upon request.

Pos	Team	Pld	W	D	L	GF	GA	GD	Pts	Qualification or relegation (Note: Teams are split into two groups (play-off and play-out) after each have played 22 matches.)
1	Flacăra Horezu (C, Q)	32	31	1	0	164	29	+135	94	Qualification to promotion play-off
2	Viitorul Dăești	32	25	3	4	129	26	+103	78	
3	Cozia Călimănești	32	24	3	5	122	34	+88	75	
4	Voința Orlești	32	13	4	15	83	73	+10	43	
5	Băbeni	32	13	4	15	106	92	+14	43	
6	Unirea Tomșani	32	11	2	19	72	106	−34	35	
7	Oltețul Alunu	30	14	3	13	81	90	−9	45	
8	Minerul Costești	30	13	1	16	73	90	−17	40	
9	Mădulari (R)	30	10	3	17	83	116	−33	33	Qualification to relegation play-offs
10	SCM Râmnicu Vâlcea (O)	30	8	2	20	79	153	−74	26	Qualification to relegation play-offs
11	Oltețul Bălcești (R)	30	4	2	24	41	133	−92	14	Relegation to Liga V Vâlcea
12	Lotru Brezoi (R)	22	1	2	19	23	114	−91	5 (Note: Lotru Brezoi withdrew from the championship play-out.)	Relegation to Liga V Vâlcea

Rules for classification: 1) Points; 2) Head-to-head points; 3) Head-to-head goal difference; 4) Head-to-head goals scored; 5) Head-to-head away goals scored; 6) Goal difference; 7) Goals scored.
(C) Champions; (O) Play-off winners; (Q) Qualified for the phase indicated; (R) Relegated
Notes:

Promotion/relegation play-offs

The 9th- and 10th-placed teams of Liga IV Vâlcea face the 2nd-placed teams in the two series of Liga V Vâlcea.

Team 1	Score	Team 2
AS Râmnicu Vâlcea	4–2	Mădulari
Cavalerul Trac Cernișoara	1–2	SCM Râmnicu Vâlcea

=== Vrancea County ===
Team changes from the previous season

- CSM Focșani achieved promotion to Liga III.
- Sportul Ciorăști (winners) and FC Panciu (runners-up) were promoted from Liga V Vrancea.
- Voința Slobozia Ciorăști (11th place) and Voința Pufești (12th place) were relegated to Liga V Vrancea.
- ACS Odobești withdrew.
- Euromania Dumbrăveni was renamed CSC Dumbrăveni.
- Unirea Milcovul, Flacăra Urechești, Podgoria Cotești, Gloria Răcoasa, Săgeata Biliești, CS Jariștea, Mausoleul Mărășești and ACS Homocea were admitted upon request.

Group A

Pos	Team	Pld	W	D	L	GF	GA	GD	Pts	Qualification
1	Sportul Ciorăști (Q)	10	8	0	2	55	12	+43	24	Qualification to championship play-off
2	Voința Cârligele (Q)	10	7	0	3	26	18	+8	21	Qualification to championship play-off
3	Victoria Gugești (O)	10	7	0	3	47	19	+28	21	Possible qualification to championship play-off
4	Flacăra Urechești	10	2	2	6	19	38	−19	8	
5	Podgoria Cotești	10	2	1	7	12	42	−30	7	
6	Săgeata Biliești	10	2	1	7	19	49	−30	7	

Rules for classification: 1) Points; 2) Head-to-head points; 3) Head-to-head goal difference; 4) Head-to-head goals scored; 5) Head-to-head away goals scored; 6) Goal difference; 7) Goals scored.
(O) Play-off winners; (Q) Qualified for the phase indicated

Group B

Pos	Team	Pld	W	D	L	GF	GA	GD	Pts	Qualification
1	Dumbrăveni (Q)	10	9	0	1	33	6	+27	27	Qualification to championship play-off
2	Tractorul Nănești (Q)	10	6	1	3	22	14	+8	19	Qualification to championship play-off
3	Național Golești (O)	10	6	1	3	27	20	+7	19	Possible qualification to championship play-off
4	Unirea Milcovul	10	2	2	6	17	30	−13	8	
5	Dinamo Tătăranu	10	2	2	6	14	26	−12	8	
6	Jariștea	10	0	4	6	19	36	−17	4	

Rules for classification: 1) Points; 2) Head-to-head points; 3) Head-to-head goal difference; 4) Head-to-head goals scored; 5) Head-to-head away goals scored; 6) Goal difference; 7) Goals scored.
(O) Play-off winners; (Q) Qualified for the phase indicated

Group C

Pos	Team	Pld	W	D	L	GF	GA	GD	Pts	Qualification
1	Mausoleul Mărășești (Q)	10	10	0	0	56	13	+43	30	Qualification to championship play-off
2	Panciu (Q)	10	6	1	3	25	24	+1	19	Qualification to championship play-off
3	Unirea Țifești	10	5	1	4	23	16	+7	16	Possible qualification to championship play-off
4	Adjud	10	4	0	6	26	19	+7	12	
5	Homocea	10	4	0	6	24	25	−1	12	
6	Gloria Răcoasa	10	0	0	10	8	65	−57	0	

Rules for classification: 1) Points; 2) Head-to-head points; 3) Head-to-head goal difference; 4) Head-to-head goals scored; 5) Head-to-head away goals scored; 6) Goal difference; 7) Goals scored.
(Q) Qualified for the phase indicated

Possible qualification to championship play-off

At the end of the regular season, a special table was created for the 3rd-placed teams from the three series. The best two teams in this table qualified for the championship play-off. In this ranking, only the points earned against the first and second-placed teams in their respective series were taken into account.

Pos	Team	Pld	W	D	L	GF	GA	GD	Pts	Qualification
1	Victoria Gugești (Q)	10	7	0	3	47	19	+28	21	Qualification to championship play-off
2	Național Golești (Q)	10	6	1	3	27	20	+7	19	Qualification to championship play-off
3	Unirea Țifești	10	5	1	4	23	16	+7	16	

Rules for classification: 1) Points; 2) Goal difference; 3) Goals scored.
(Q) Qualified for the phase indicated

Championship play-off

Pos	Team	Pld	W	D	L	GF	GA	GD	Pts	Qualification
1	Sportul Ciorăști (C, Q)	14	11	3	0	55	12	+43	36	Qualification to promotion play-off
2	Național Golești	14	8	4	2	41	16	+25	28	
3	Mausoleul Mărășești	14	8	2	4	33	24	+9	26	
4	Victoria Gugești	14	6	2	6	24	37	−13	20	
5	Voința Cârligele	14	4	3	7	24	38	−14	15	
6	Dumbrăveni	14	3	4	7	22	39	−17	13	
7	Tractorul Nănești	14	3	1	10	19	36	−17	10	
8	Panciu	14	3	1	10	14	30	−16	10	

Rules for classification: 1) Points; 2) Head-to-head points; 3) Head-to-head goal difference; 4) Head-to-head goals scored; 5) Head-to-head away goals scored; 6) Goal difference; 7) Goals scored.
(C) Champions; (Q) Qualified for the phase indicated

== See also ==
- 2017–18 Liga I
- 2017–18 Liga II
- 2017–18 Liga III
- 2017–18 Cupa României
