= Letea Veche =

- Commune
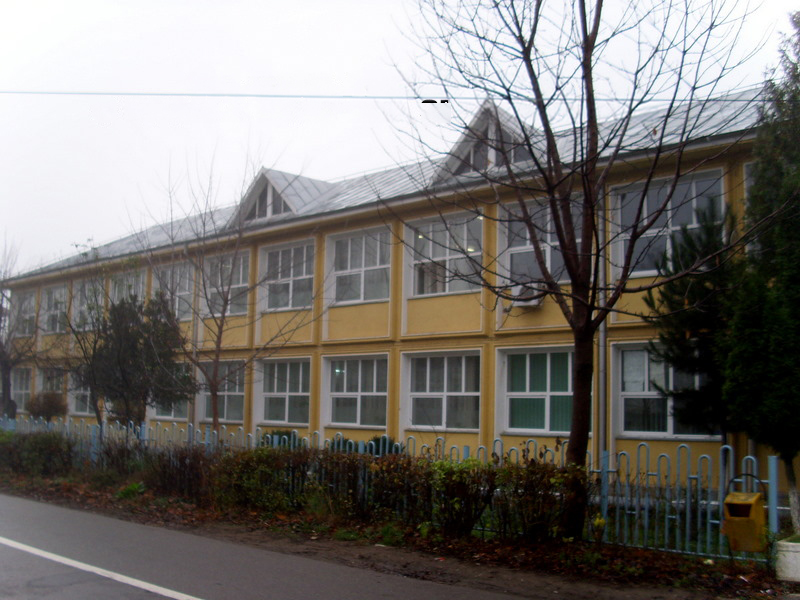
- Letea Technical College

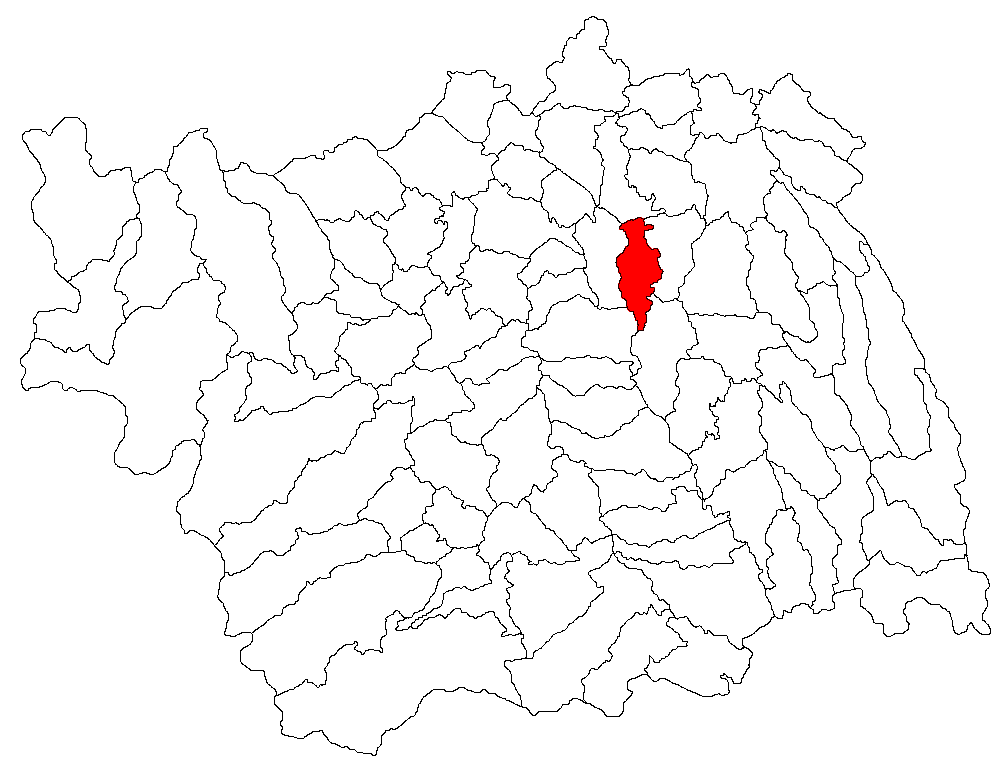
- Location in Bacău County

- Location in Romania
- Coordinates: 46°33′N 26°57′E
- Country: Romania
- County: Bacău

Government
  - Mayor (2024–2028): Petru Dochiei (PSD)
- Area: 42.36 km^{2} (16.36 sq mi)
- Elevation: 153 m (502 ft)
- Population (2021-12-01): 6,799
  - Density: 160.5/km^{2} (415.7/sq mi)
- Time zone: UTC+02:00 (EET)
  - Summer (DST): UTC+03:00 (EEST)
- Postal code: 607270
- Area code: +(40) 0234
- Vehicle reg.: BC
- Website: primarialeteaveche.ro

Letea Veche is a commune in Bacău County, Western Moldavia, Romania. It is composed of five villages: Holt, Letea Veche, Radomirești, Ruși-Ciutea, and Siretu.

Stadionul Letea Veche is a multi-purpose stadium located in the commune. It is currently used mostly for football matches, and is the home ground of CSM Bacău.
