= Stadionul Letea Veche =

Multi purpose stadium in Romania

- Interactive map of Stadionul Letea Veche
- Address: Str. Preot Emil Pavel 3
- Location: Letea Veche, Romania
- Coordinates: 46°33′05.3″N 26°56′40.4″E
- Owner: Commune of Letea Veche
- Operator: CSM Bacău
- Capacity: 1,500 (0 seated)
- Surface: Grass

Tenants
- FCM Bacău (2017–2018); CSM Bacău (2020–present)

Stadionul Letea Veche is a multi-purpose stadium in Letea Veche, Romania, near Bacău. It is currently used mostly for football matches, is the home ground of CSM Bacău and holds 1,500 people. The stadium was used over time by various clubs, but since 2014 (when Municipal Stadium was closed) more and more teams based in Bacău and its neighborhoods started to use it.
