= ACS Gauss Bacău =

Romanian football club

Gauss Bacău
- Full name: Asociația Club Sportiv Gauss Bacău
- Nicknames: Băcăuanii (The Bacău People)
- Short name: Gauss
- Founded: 2006; 20 years ago as Mesagerul Bacău
- Ground: Letea Veche
- Capacity: 1,000
- Owner: Cristian Postolache
- Chairman: Sebastian Păuceanu
- League: Liga IV
- 2025–26: Liga IV, Bacău County, 17th of 22
Home colours	Away colours

Asociația Club Sportiv Gauss Bacău, commonly known as Gauss Bacău (Romanian pronunciation: [ˈɡaʊs baˈkəw]), or simply as Gauss, is a Romanian football club based in Bacău, Bacău County. Founded in 2006 under the name of Mesagerul Bacău, the club promoted to Liga III in 2010, then being bought by Municipality of Bacău and changed its name in SC Bacău. Under this name, the club obtained its best rankings, promoting in the second tier and obtaining at its best a 4th place. In 2016 the Municipality retired its financial support and Sport Club withdrew from the second league, then being bought by Cristian Postolache and merging with his club, Gauss Răcăciuni, changing its name in Gauss Bacău and therefore signing up for the Liga III.

== History ==
=== First years and ascension ===
Gauss Bacău was founded in 2006 under the name of Mesagerul Bacău, project started at the initiative of a group of football lovers, a group of friends who used to play five-a-side football and decided to play at a more organized level.

Sports activities started during the 2006–07 competitive season when Mesagerul Bacău was enrolled in the Liga V and the team had surprisingly good results managing to qualify for the Liga IV – Bacău County promotion play-offs after finishing 3rd. Due to lack of experience, the team failed to promote. Next season, Mesagerul was ranked 1st after a great journey thus fulfilling its goal, to promote in the Liga IV. Following the Liga IV promotion, the club managed to obtain a 1st place again, in its very first year of participation, having also a great standing line. Eventually, the promotion to Liga III was missed at penalty shoot-out in front of FC Dumitrești, Vrancea County champions, score 3–5.

In the 2009–10 edition Mesagerul won again the Liga IV and this time promoted to Liga III after winning a promotion play-off match against Mureș County champions, Gaz Metan Târgu Mureș, score 8–7 at penalty shoot-out.

In July 2010, after the promotion, the team was bought by the Municipality of Bacău and changed its name from Mesagerul Bacău to Sport Club Bacău. In its first two seasons of Liga III, SC Bacău was every time ranked as 2nd, then in the 2012–13 Liga III season, which was a great one for the club, SC Bacău managed to take the 1st place and promoted to Liga II. In their first two Liga II seasons, the team played very well and succeeded to obtain a play-off qualification every time, finishing on 6th place, respectively 4th place at the end of the play-off phase.

Name	Period
Mesagerul Bacău	2006–2010
SC Bacău	2010–2017
Gauss Bacău	2017–present

=== Downfall ===
After finishing the 2015–16 Liga II season on 6th place, financial problems made the club join Liga III for the 2016–17 season. Abandoned by Bacău Municipality and with a lot of debts the club was bought by Cristian Postolache, the former owner of Bacău County champions, Gauss Răcăciuni, a team which failed to achieve the promotion to Liga III. Despite the fact that the team had good performances on the pitch the financial situation of the club was difficult to balance due to historical debts and memoirs made by former players. SC Bacău was penalized with 60 points by Romanian Football Federation, finishing last one with −25 points and relegated to Liga IV at 7 years after its promotion to the professional football.

After the relegation, the penalties continued to run for SC Bacău, so the club's management decided to reorganize the club's structure, now situated at amateur level, in Liga IV – Bacău County. SC Bacău was renamed as Gauss Bacău and kept its administrative and technical staff, and most of the players. At the end of the season Gauss won Liga IV – Bacău County and the promotion play-off, but before the first round of the new Liga III season withdrew due to financial problems.

After a season if inactivity, Gauss ownership decided to "wake up" the team and enrolled it in the Liga IV.

== Honours ==
Liga III

- Winners (1): 2012–13
- Runners-up (1): 2010–11, 2011–12

Liga IV – Bacău County

- Winners (3): 2008–09, 2009–10, 2017–18
- Runners-up (1): 2023–24

Liga V – Bacău County

- Winners (1): 2007–08

== Former managers ==
- (Romania) Marin Barbu (2012)
- (Romania) Viorel Tănase (2012)
- (Romania) Marius Baciu (2012–2013)
- (Romania) Viorel Tănase (2013–2014)
