= Dinu =

== People with the given name ==
- Dinu Brătianu (1866–1951), Romanian politician
- Dinu Cocea (1929–2013), Romanian actor, film director and screenwriter
- Dinu Ghezzo (1941–2011), Romanian conductor
- Dinu C. Giurescu (1927–2018), Romanian historian and politician
- Dinu Graur (born 1994), Moldovan footballer
- Dinu Grigoresco (1914–2001), Romanian-French painter
- Dinu Li, British artist
- Dinu Lipatti (1917–1950), Romanian classical pianist and composer
- Dinu Moldovan (born 1990), Romanian footballer
- Dinu Nicodin (1886–1948), Romanian writer
- Dinu Negreanu (1917–2001), Romanian film director
- Dinu Patriciu (1950–2014), Romanian businessman and politician
- Dinu Pescariu (born 1974), Romanian tennis player
- Dinu Pillat (1921–1975), Romanian literary critic and writer
- Dinu Sănmărtean (born 1981), Romanian footballer
- Dinu Săraru (born 1932), Romanian novelist and playwright
- Dinu Solanki (born 1958), Indian politician from Gujarat
- Dinu Thakur, Indian Bengali musician and singer
- Dinu Todoran (born 1978), Romanian footballer

== People with the surname ==
- Bogdan Dinu (born 1986), Romanian boxer
- Ciprian Dinu (born 1982), Romanian footballer
- Cornel Dinu (born 1948), Romanian footballer
- Cristea Dinu (1911–1991), Romanian long-distance runner
- Cristina Dinu (born 1993), Romanian tennis player
- Gheorghe Dinu (1904–1974), Romanian poet, editor, film critic, and communist militant
- Loredana Dinu (born 1984), Romanian fencer
- Luminița Dinu (born 1971), Romanian handball player
- Marcel Dinu (born 1935), Romanian diplomat
- Marian Dinu (born 1965), Romanian football player and coach
- Medi Dinu (1909–2016), Romanian classical painter
- Robert Dinu (born 1974), Romanian water polo player
- Viorel Dinu (born 1980), Romanian footballer
- Victor Emanoil Dinu (born 1988), Romanian nuclear specialist
