= Todoran =

Todoran is a Romanian surname. Notable people with the surname include:

- Dinu Todoran (born 1978), Romanian football player and manager
- Paula Todoran (born 1985), Romanian long-distance runner
