= Grigorești =

Grigoreşti may refer to:

- Grigoreşti, a village in Siminicea Commune, Suceava County, Romania
- Grigoreşti, a village in Alexăndreni Commune, Sîngerei district, Moldova

== See also ==
- Grigorescu
