= Grigorescu =

Grigorescu (Romanian pronunciation: [ɡriɡoˈresku]) is a Romanian surname. Notable people with the surname include:

- Alexandra Grigorescu, author of Cauchemar, 2016 nominee for the Sunburst Award
- Dinu Grigoresco (1914–2001), Romanian and French painter
- Eremia Grigorescu (1863–1919), Romanian general of artillery during World War I
  - Grigorescu, Cluj-Napoca, a district of Cluj-Napoca, Romania named after him
- Ion Grigorescu (born 1945), Romanian painter
- Lucian Grigorescu (1894–1965), Romanian post-impressionist painter
- Nicolae Grigorescu (1838–1907), one of the founders of modern Romanian painting
  - Bucharest National University of Arts, called the Nicolae Grigorescu Fine Arts Institute from 1948 to 1990
  - Nicolae Grigorescu metro station
