= Gheorghe Dincă Stadium =

Voluntari II stadium

Gheorghe Dinică Stadium
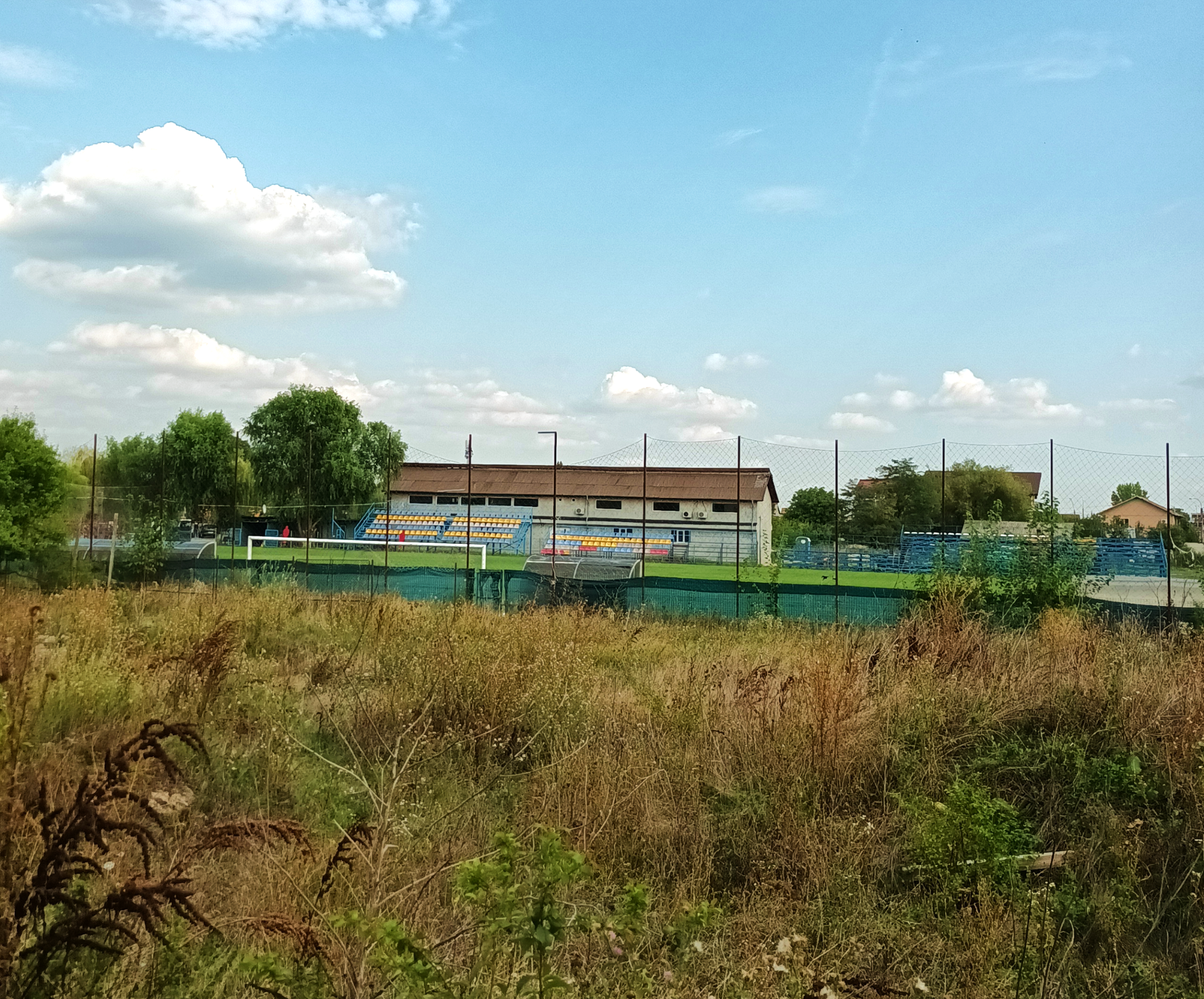
- Interactive map of Gheorghe Dinică Stadium
- Former names: Central Stadium; Dumitru Plischi Stadium
- Address: Str. Gheorghe Dinică
- Location: Voluntari, Romania
- Coordinates: 44°29′11.3″N 26°10′25.6″E
- Owner: Town of Voluntari
- Capacity: 1,500 (700 seated)
- Surface: Grass

Tenants
- Voluntari (2010–2012); Voluntari II (2014–2024)

The Gheorghe Dinică Stadium is a multi-purpose stadium in Voluntari, Romania. It is currently used mostly for football matches, is the home ground of FC Voluntari II and holds 1,500 people. The stadium was the main arena based in Voluntari, until the building of Anghel Iordănescu Stadium and was also the home ground of FC Voluntari, between 2010 and 2012.
