= 2014–15 Liga IV =

Liga IV
- Season: 2014–15
- Country: Romania

The 2014–15 Liga IV was the 73rd season of the Liga IV, the fourth tier of the Romanian football league system. The champions of each county association play against one from a neighboring county in a playoff to gain promotion.

== Promotion play-off ==
The matches are scheduled to be played on 20 and 27 June 2015.

Team 1	Agg.	Team 2	1st leg	2nd leg
Performanța Ighiu (AB)	6–1	(AR) Progresul Pecica	1–1	5–0
Aninoasa (DB)	4–2	(AG) Unirea Bascov	2–1	2–1
Potaissa Turda (CJ)	w/o	(BH) Luceafărul Oradea	w/o	w/o
Înfrățirea Hărman (BV)	8–4	(MS) Viitorul Ungheni	2–0	6–4
Olimpia Râmnicu Sărat (BZ)	7–1	(GL) Avântul Valea Mărului	1–1	6–0
Chitila (B)	w/o	(CL) Oltenița	w/o	w/o
Viitorul Constanța II (CT)	7–1	(TL) Granitul Babadag	2–0	5–1
Odorheiu Secuiesc (HR)	7–1	(CV) Nemere Ghelința	1–1	6–0
Cetate Deva (HD)	11–3	(GJ) Gilortul Târgu Cărbunești	8–2	3–1
Voluntari II (IF)	9–1	(GR) Arsenal Malu	6–1	3–0
Comuna Recea (MM)	5–4	(BN) Voința Cetate	3–1	2–3
CS U II Craiova (DJ)	12–0	(MH) Pandurii Cerneți	4–0	8–0
Unirea Mircești (IS)	2–3	(NT) Speranța Răucești	1–2	1–1
Sporting Turnu Măgurele (TR)	5–1	(OT) Milcov	2–0	3–1
Petrolistul Boldești (PH)	6–0	(IL) Unirea Fierbinți	3–0	3–0
Olimpia II Satu Mare (SM)	4–6	(SJ) Luceafărul Bălan	2–1	2–5
Inter Dorohoi (BT)	0–0 (3–2 p)	(SV) Bucovina II Pojorâta	0–0	0–0
ASU Politehnica Timișoara (TM)	6–3	(CS) Voința Lupac	5–1	1–2
Sport Club Bacău II (BC)	w/o	(VS) Atletico Vaslui	w/o	w/o
Măgura Cisnădie (SB)	2–1	(VL) Flacăra Horezu	0–0	2–1
Victoria Traian (BR)	4–7	(VN) Panciu	1–1	3–6

== County leagues ==
=== Alba County ===
Pos	Team	Pld	W	D	L	GF	GA	GD	Pts	Qualification or relegation
1	Performanța Ighiu (C, Q)	30	26	2	2	120	19	+101	80	Qualification to promotion play-off
2	Mureșul Vințu de Jos	30	25	2	3	74	26	+48	77	
3	Olimpia Aiud	30	18	7	5	86	45	+41	61	
4	Șurianu Sebeș	30	18	5	7	70	27	+43	59	
5	Viitorul Sântimbru	30	16	6	8	63	35	+28	54	
6	Cuprirom Abrud	30	14	6	10	58	50	+8	48	
7	Euro Șpring	30	10	14	6	48	42	+6	44	
8	Pianu	30	13	5	12	53	54	−1	44	
9	Rapid CFR Teiuș	30	12	3	15	54	56	−2	39	
10	Inter Ciugud	30	11	2	17	55	65	−10	35	
11	Dalia Sport Daia Romană	30	9	7	14	58	65	−7	34	
12	Micești	30	8	7	15	39	71	−32	31	
13	CIL Blaj	30	8	4	18	50	78	−28	28	
14	Ocna Mureș	30	7	3	20	36	83	−47	24	
15	Energia Săsciori (R)	30	7	2	21	33	81	−48	23	Relegation to Liga V Alba
16	CSO Cugir (R)	30	0	1	29	13	113	−100	1 (Note: CSO Cugir withdrew from the championship during the winter break and lost all the matches from the second part of the season with 0–3.)	Relegation to Liga V Alba

Rules for classification: 1) Points; 2) Head-to-head points; 3) Head-to-head goal difference; 4) Head-to-head goals scored; 5) Head-to-head away goals scored; 6) Goal difference; 7) Goals scored.
(C) Champions; (Q) Qualified for the phase indicated; (R) Relegated

=== Arad County ===
Pos	Team	Pld	W	D	L	GF	GA	GD	Pts	Qualification or relegation
1	Progresul Pecica (C, Q)	24	18	2	4	60	16	+44	56	Qualification to promotion play-off
2	Crișul Chișineu-Criș	24	15	3	6	51	22	+29	48	
3	Șoimii Lipova	24	13	4	7	49	27	+22	43	
4	Victoria Lunca-Teuz Cermei	24	13	4	7	52	32	+20	43	
5	Unirea Sântana	24	13	3	8	54	28	+26	42	
6	Aqua Vest Arad	24	12	2	10	43	52	−9	38	
7	Victoria Zăbrani	24	10	7	7	39	42	−3	37	
8	UTA Arad II	24	11	3	10	42	37	+5	36	
9	Frontiera Curtici	24	10	4	10	35	34	+1	34	
10	Voința Mailat	24	8	5	11	29	43	−14	29	
11	Păulișana Păuliș	24	6	2	16	31	52	−21	20	
12	Național Sebiș II (R)	24	3	3	18	16	52	−36	12 (Note: Național Sebiș II withdrew from the championship after 18 rounds and lost all remaining matches with 0–3.)	Relegation to Liga V Arad
13	Banatul Sânnicolau Mic (R)	24	2	2	20	15	79	−64	8	Relegation to Liga V Arad
14	Gloria CTP Arad (D)	0	0	0	0	0	0	0	0 (Note: Gloria CTP Arad was excluded from the championship after 12 rounds and all its results were canceled.)	Withdrew

Rules for classification: 1) Points; 2) Head-to-head points; 3) Head-to-head goal difference; 4) Head-to-head goals scored; 5) Head-to-head away goals scored; 6) Goal difference; 7) Goals scored.
(C) Champions; (D) Disqualified; (Q) Qualified for the phase indicated; (R) Relegated

=== Argeș County ===
Pos	Team	Pld	W	D	L	GF	GA	GD	Pts	Qualification or relegation
1	Unirea Bascov (C, Q)	26	24	0	2	83	13	+70	72	Qualification to promotion play-off
2	Argeș 1953 Pitești	26	22	1	3	111	28	+83	67	
3	Mioveni II	26	20	4	2	99	27	+72	64	
4	Victoria Buzoiești	26	16	2	8	69	43	+26	50	
5	Gloria Berevoești	26	15	3	8	44	37	+7	48	
6	Micești 2002	26	13	2	11	40	56	−16	41	
7	Viitorul Ștefănești	26	10	2	14	42	53	−11	32	
8	DLR Pitești	26	9	2	15	41	54	−13	29	
9	Rucăr	26	7	5	14	36	63	−27	26	
10	Viitorul Cireșu	26	7	2	17	26	66	−40	23	
11	Olimpia Suseni	26	5	7	14	46	65	−19	22	
12	Curtea de Argeș	26	6	2	18	45	79	−34	20	
13	Miroși (R)	26	6	0	20	35	105	−70	18 (Note: Atletic Bradu II–Miroși 6–3; Miroși–Atletic Bradu II 3–0.)	Relegation to Liga V Argeș
14	Atletic Bradu II (Note: Atletic Bradu II was excluded from the championship after 14 rounds and lost all remaining matches with 0–3.) (R)	26	6	0	20	41	69	−28	18	Relegation to Liga V Argeș

Rules for classification: 1) Points; 2) Head-to-head points; 3) Head-to-head goal difference; 4) Head-to-head goals scored; 5) Head-to-head away goals scored; 6) Goal difference; 7) Goals scored.
(C) Champions; (Q) Qualified for the phase indicated; (R) Relegated

=== Bacău County ===
Pos	Team	Pld	W	D	L	GF	GA	GD	Pts	Qualification or relegation
1	Sport Club Bacău II (C, Q)	30	27	2	1	120	19	+101	83	Qualification to promotion play-off
2	Nicolae Bălcescu	30	25	3	2	105	25	+80	78	
3	Dofteana	30	18	4	8	87	49	+38	58	
4	Tescani	30	18	2	10	74	48	+26	56	
5	Uzu Dărmănești	30	17	3	10	69	40	+29	54	
6	Moinești	30	16	4	10	77	55	+22	52	
7	Filipești	30	16	1	13	68	52	+16	49	
8	Voința Gârleni	30	14	5	11	57	47	+10	47	
9	Negri	30	10	6	14	45	64	−19	36	
10	Gloria Zemeș	30	10	4	16	63	69	−6	34	
11	Târgu Ocna	30	9	4	17	45	63	−18	31	
12	Voința Oituz	30	9	3	18	52	81	−29	30	
13	Vulturul Măgirești	30	8	4	18	43	87	−44	28	
14	Măgura Cașin	30	7	4	19	41	101	−60	25	
15	Flamura Roșie Sascut	30	5	2	23	21	99	−78	17	
16	Siretu	30	3	5	22	37	105	−68	14	
17	Dinamo Onești (R)	0	0	0	0	0	0	0	0 (Note: FCM Dinamo Onești withdrew after 16 rounds and all its results were canceled.)	Expelled
18	Șoimii Helegiu (R)	0	0	0	0	0	0	0	0 (Note: Șoimii Helegiu withdrew after 6 rounds and all its results were canceled.)	Expelled

Rules for classification: 1) Points; 2) Head-to-head points; 3) Head-to-head goal difference; 4) Head-to-head goals scored; 5) Head-to-head away goals scored; 6) Goal difference; 7) Goals scored.
(C) Champions; (Q) Qualified for the phase indicated; (R) Relegated

=== Bihor County ===
Pos	Team	Pld	W	D	L	GF	GA	GD	Pts	Qualification or relegation
1	Luceafărul Oradea (C, Q)	30	29	1	0	177	7	+170	88	Qualification for promotion play-off
2	Crișul Sântandrei	30	23	3	4	89	21	+68	72	
3	Hidișelu de Sus	30	20	6	4	96	43	+53	66	
4	Olimpia Salonta	30	21	2	7	86	47	+39	65	
5	Ștei	30	17	3	10	54	38	+16	54	
6	Bihorul Beiuș	30	14	7	9	68	45	+23	49	
7	Partium Oradea	30	13	6	11	69	58	+11	45	
8	Bihor Oradea II	30	14	2	14	62	42	+20	44 (Note: Bihor Oradea II–Unirea Valea lui Mihai 6–0; Unirea Valea lui Mihai–Bihor Oradea II 3–0;)	
9	Unirea Valea lui Mihai	30	14	2	14	63	57	+6	44	
10	Viitorul Borș	30	12	3	15	41	67	−26	39	
11	Viitorul Marghita	30	9	3	18	41	60	−19	30	
12	Victoria Avram Iancu	30	7	6	17	45	72	−27	27 (Note: Universitatea Oradea–Victoria Avram Iancu 0–0; Victoria Avram Iancu–Universitatea Oradea 2–0;)	
13	Universitatea Oradea	30	7	6	17	45	90	−45	27	
14	Poiana Budureasa (Note: Due to the promotion of Luceafărul Oradea to Liga III, Poiana Budureasa was spared from relegation.)	30	7	2	21	29	84	−55	23	Spared from relegation
15	Crișul Aleșd (R)	30	6	2	22	36	101	−65	20	Relegation to Liga V Bihor
16	Liberty Oradea (R)	30	0	0	30	23	192	−169	0	Relegation to Liga V Bihor

Rules for classification: Rules for classification: 1) Points 2) Head-to-head points; 3) Head-to-head goal difference; 4) Head-to-head goals scored; 5) Head-to-head away goals scored; 6) Goal difference; 7) Goals scored.
(C) Champions; (Q) Qualified for the phase indicated; (R) Relegated

=== Bistrița-Năsăud County ===
Pos	Team	Pld	W	D	L	GF	GA	GD	Pts	Qualification or relegation
1	Voința Cetate (C, Q)	24	18	3	3	109	50	+59	57	Qualification to promotion play-off
2	Voința Livezile	24	16	5	3	84	35	+49	53	
3	Viitorul Șieu-Măgheruș	24	15	2	7	71	43	+28	47	
4	Heniu Leșu	24	14	4	6	76	33	+43	46	
5	Progresul Năsăud	24	12	4	8	78	70	+8	40	
6	Bistrița	24	11	4	9	71	57	+14	37 (Note: Atletico Monor–Bistrița 1–2; Bistrița–Atletico Monor 3–1)	
7	Atletico Monor	24	12	1	11	66	60	+6	37	
8	Dumitra	24	9	5	10	57	51	+6	32	
9	Silvicultorul Maieru	24	8	2	14	56	89	−33	26	
10	Voința Mărișelu	24	7	1	16	66	119	−53	22	
11	Eciro Forest Telciu	24	6	3	15	53	86	−33	21	
12	Viitorul Lechința	24	3	6	15	48	103	−55	15	
13	Luceafărul Șieu (R)	24	4	2	18	38	77	−39	14	Relegation to Liga V Bistrița-Năsăud

Rules for classification: 1) Points; 2) Head-to-head points; 3) Head-to-head goal difference; 4) Head-to-head goals scored; 5) Head-to-head away goals scored; 6) Goal difference; 7) Goals scored.
(C) Champions; (Q) Qualified for the phase indicated; (R) Relegated

=== Botoșani County ===
Pos	Team	Pld	W	D	L	GF	GA	GD	Pts	Qualification or relegation
1	Inter Dorohoi (C, Q)	26	23	2	1	116	18	+98	71	Qualification to promotion play-off
2	Luceafărul Mihai Eminescu	26	20	3	3	111	29	+82	63	
3	TransDor Tudora	26	16	4	6	78	41	+37	52	
4	Sănătatea Darabani	26	15	6	5	70	25	+45	51	
5	Flacăra 1907 Flămânzi	26	14	4	8	67	45	+22	46	
6	Prosport Vârfu Câmpului	26	13	4	9	57	47	+10	43	
7	Avântul Albești	26	12	5	9	57	38	+19	41	
8	Bucovina Rogojești	26	12	3	11	82	59	+23	39	
9	Rapid Ungureni	26	12	1	13	62	62	0	37	
10	Sportivul Trușești	26	8	1	17	48	65	−17	25	
11	Răchiți	26	6	4	16	44	89	−45	22	
12	Șoimii Bălușeni	26	6	3	17	37	78	−41	21	
13	Bucecea	26	4	2	20	35	152	−117	14	
14	Viitorul Dersca (R)	26	0	0	26	11	127	−116	0 (Note: Viitorul Dersca was excluded from the championship and lost all the matches from the second part of the season with 0–3.)	Relegation to Liga V Botoșani
15	Dante Botoșani (D)	0	0	0	0	0	0	0	0 (Note: Dante Botoșani and Păltiniș withdrew in the first part of the season and all their results were canceled.)	Withdrew
16	Păltiniș (D)	0	0	0	0	0	0	0	0	Withdrew

Rules for classification: 1) Points; 2) Head-to-head points; 3) Head-to-head goal difference; 4) Head-to-head goals scored; 5) Head-to-head away goals scored; 6) Goal difference; 7) Goals scored.
(C) Champions; (D) Disqualified; (Q) Qualified for the phase indicated; (R) Relegated

=== Brașov County ===
Pos	Team	Pld	W	D	L	GF	GA	GD	Pts	Qualification or relegation
1	Înfrăţirea Agromec Hărman (C, Q)	30	25	3	2	124	28	+96	78	Qualification to promotion play-off
2	Zărnești	30	25	3	2	92	28	+64	78	
3	Inter Cristian	30	22	5	3	110	34	+76	71	
4	Victoria	30	20	4	6	69	45	+24	64	
5	Codlea	30	15	10	5	54	26	+28	55	
6	Viitorul Ghimbav	30	14	4	12	67	49	+18	46	
7	Olimpic Cetate Râșnov	30	14	3	13	61	60	+1	45	
8	Hălchiu 2013	30	13	2	15	60	55	+5	41	
9	Olimpic Voila	30	12	4	14	43	72	−29	40	
10	Aripile Brașov	30	11	3	16	51	61	−10	36	
11	Cetatea Rupea-Homorod	30	10	5	15	51	61	−10	35	
12	Prejmer	30	10	1	19	47	75	−28	31	
13	Bran	30	5	7	18	27	73	−46	22	
14	Energia Unirea Feldioara (R)	30	6	2	22	36	104	−68	20	Relegation to Liga V Brașov
15	Carpați Berivoi (R)	30	3	5	22	49	119	−70	14	Relegation to Liga V Brașov
16	Civitas Făgăraș (R)	30	3	3	24	21	72	−51	12	Relegation to Liga V Brașov

Rules for classification: 1) Points; 2) Head-to-head points; 3) Head-to-head goal difference; 4) Head-to-head goals scored; 5) Head-to-head away goals scored; 6) Goal difference; 7) Goals scored.
(C) Champions; (Q) Qualified for the phase indicated; (R) Relegated

=== Brăila County ===
Pos	Team	Pld	W	D	L	GF	GA	GD	Pts	Qualification or relegation
1	Victoria Traian (C, Q)	24	21	3	0	87	19	+68	66	Qualification to promotion play-off
2	Viitorul Însurăței	24	19	2	3	120	29	+91	59	
3	Stars Brăila	24	14	4	6	63	34	+29	46	
4	Sportul Chiscani	24	14	1	9	68	35	+33	43	
5	Voința Vișani	24	13	1	10	51	58	−7	40	
6	Pandurii Tudor Vladimirescu	24	12	3	9	62	47	+15	39	
7	Viitorul Ianca	24	12	2	10	59	33	+26	38	
8	Făurei	24	10	5	9	53	61	−8	35	
9	Victoria Cazasu	24	8	4	12	41	59	−18	28	
10	Victoria Old-Boys Însurăței	24	7	3	14	46	68	−22	24	
11	Gloria Movila Miresii	24	6	2	16	41	83	−42	20	
12	Avântul Mircea Vodă (R)	24	3	0	21	28	91	−63	9 (Note: Avântul Mircea Vodă withdrew from the championship after 14 rounds and lost all the remaining matches with 0–3.)	Relegation to Liga V Brăila
13	Voința Surdila-Găiseanca (R)	24	2	0	22	21	123	−102	6	Relegation to Liga V Brăila

Rules for classification: 1) Points; 2) Head-to-head points; 3) Head-to-head goal difference; 4) Head-to-head goals scored; 5) Head-to-head away goals scored; 6) Goal difference; 7) Goals scored.
(C) Champions; (Q) Qualified for the phase indicated; (R) Relegated

=== Bucharest ===
==== Regular season ====
===== Seria 1 =====
Pos	Team	Pld	W	D	L	GF	GA	GD	Pts	Qualification or relegation
1	Chitila	22	20	1	1	106	11	+95	61	Qualification to championship play-off
2	Sportul Studențesc București II	22	16	2	4	58	26	+32	50	Qualification to championship play-off
3	Electroaparataj București	22	15	1	6	81	42	+39	46	Qualification to championship play-off
4	Termo București	22	13	3	6	57	31	+26	42	Qualification to championship play-off
5	Comprest GIM București	22	12	3	7	52	33	+19	39	Qualification to championship play-off
6	Progresul București	22	11	5	6	54	42	+12	38	Qualification to championship play-off
7	GVD București	22	8	3	11	56	79	−23	27	
8	Electrica București	22	7	3	12	33	54	−21	24	
9	Unirea Tricolor București	22	5	4	13	47	69	−22	19	
10	Corbeanca	22	4	6	12	51	57	−6	18	
11	Juniorul București	22	5	1	16	50	96	−46	16	
12	Pantelimon	22	0	0	22	17	122	−105	0 (Note: Pantelimon excluded in the second part of the season and lost all remaining matches with 0–3.)	

Rules for classification: 1) Points; 2) Head-to-head points; 3) Head-to-head goal difference; 4) Head-to-head goals scored; 5) Head-to-head away goals scored; 6) Goal difference; 7) Goals scored.

===== Seria 2 =====
Pos	Team	Pld	W	D	L	GF	GA	GD	Pts	Qualification or relegation
1	Chelsea București	20	15	2	3	73	31	+42	47	Qualification to championship play-off
2	Speranța Săbăreni	20	12	3	5	57	35	+22	39	Qualification to championship play-off
3	Romprim București	20	10	4	6	62	41	+21	34	
4	Frăția București	20	8	8	4	38	27	+11	32	
5	LSM București	20	10	2	8	41	40	+1	32	
6	Metaloglobus București II	20	9	4	7	77	41	+36	31	
7	Venus București	20	8	4	8	38	31	+7	28	
8	VK Soccer București	20	8	2	10	44	41	+3	26	
9	Unirea Joița	20	6	0	14	35	74	−39	18	
10	Victoria București	20	4	2	14	25	103	−78	14	
11	Liceul Tehnologic Sfântul Pantelimon	20	3	3	14	34	60	−26	12	
12	1 Decembrie (D)	0	0	0	0	0	0	0	0 (Note: 1 Decembrie withdrew after 6 rounds and all its results were canceled.)	Withdrew

Rules for classification: 1) Points; 2) Head-to-head points; 3) Head-to-head goal difference; 4) Head-to-head goals scored; 5) Head-to-head away goals scored; 6) Goal difference; 7) Goals scored.
(D) Disqualified

==== Championship play-off ====
===== Group 1 =====
All matches were played at Romprim Stadium in Bucharest.

Pos	Team	Pld	W	D	L	GF	GA	GD	Pts	Qualification	TER	SPO	COM	PRO
1	Termo București (Q)	2	1	0	1	2	1	+1	3	Qualification to semi-finals		0–1	?	
2	Sportul Studențesc București II (Q)	2	1	1	0	2	1	+1	4	Qualification to semi-finals				
3	Comprest GIM București	2	1	1	0	4	1	+3	4			1–1		
4	Progresul București	2	0	0	2	0	5	−5	0		0–2	?	0–3	

Rules for classification: 1) Points; 2) Head-to-head points; 3) Head-to-head goal difference; 4) Head-to-head goals scored; 5) Head-to-head away goals scored; 6) Goal difference; 7) Goals scored.
(Q) Qualified for the phase indicated

===== Group 2 =====
All matches were played at Clinceni Stadium in Clinceni.

Pos	Team	Pld	W	D	L	GF	GA	GD	Pts	Qualification	CHI	CHB	ELP	SPS
1	Chitila (Q)	2	2	0	0	9	1	+8	6	Qualification to semi-finals		5–0		?
2	Chelsea București (Q)	2	1	0	1	2	5	−3	3	Qualification to semi-finals				
3	Electroaparataj București	2	1	0	1	4	5	−1	3		1–4	?		3–1
4	Speranța Săbăreni	2	0	0	2	1	5	−4	0			0–2		

Rules for classification: 1) Points; 2) Head-to-head points; 3) Head-to-head goal difference; 4) Head-to-head goals scored; 5) Head-to-head away goals scored; 6) Goal difference; 7) Goals scored.
(Q) Qualified for the phase indicated

===== Semi-finals =====
Team 1	Score	Team 2
Termo București	2–1	Chelsea București
Sportul Studențesc București II	2–4	Chitila

===== Final =====
Team 1	Score	Team 2
Chitila	3–1	Termo București

Chitila won the 2014–15 Liga IV Bucharest and qualify to promotion play-off in Liga III.

=== Buzău County ===
Pos	Team	Pld	W	D	L	GF	GA	GD	Pts	Qualification or relegation
1	Olimpia Râmnicu Sărat (C, Q)	30	27	3	0	135	23	+112	84	Qualification to promotion play-off
2	Petrolul Berca	30	23	4	3	130	20	+110	73	
3	Puiești	30	24	1	5	115	26	+89	73	
4	Voința Lanurile	30	20	5	5	132	35	+97	65	
5	Avântul Spartac Zărnești	30	15	5	10	82	64	+18	50	
6	Diadema Gherăseni	30	15	5	10	69	67	+2	50	
7	Com Sageata	30	14	4	12	81	69	+12	46	
8	Locomotiva Viitorul Buzău	30	10	9	11	60	54	+6	39	
9	Carpați Nehoiu	30	11	5	14	46	49	−3	38	
10	Recolta Sălcioara	30	10	2	18	54	92	−38	32	
11	Gloria Vadu Pașii	30	9	4	17	47	86	−39	31	
12	Viitorul 08 Vernești	30	9	1	20	58	119	−61	28	
13	Metalul LPS Buzău	30	7	3	20	43	85	−42	24	
14	Victoria Boboc	30	7	3	20	42	107	−65	24 (Note: Victoria Boboc was spared from relegation due to the promotion of Olimpia Râmnicu Sărat in Divizia C.)	Spared from relegation
15	Șoimii Siriu (R)	30	5	1	24	31	99	−68	16	Relegation to Liga V Buzău
16	Săhăteni (R)	30	5	1	24	34	170	−136	16	Relegation to Liga V Buzău

Rules for classification: 1) Points; 2) Head-to-head points; 3) Head-to-head goal difference; 4) Head-to-head goals scored; 5) Head-to-head away goals scored; 6) Goal difference; 7) Goals scored.
(C) Champions; (Q) Qualified for the phase indicated; (R) Relegated

=== Călărași County ===
Pos	Team	Pld	W	D	L	GF	GA	GD	Pts	Qualification or relegation
1	Oltenița (C, Q)	30	28	0	2	148	28	+120	84	Qualification to promotion play-off
2	Venus Independența	30	25	2	3	145	31	+114	77	
3	Victoria Chirnogi	30	21	2	7	164	33	+131	65	
4	Dunărea Ciocănești	30	19	4	7	101	46	+55	61	
5	Spicul Roseți	30	13	2	15	91	96	−5	41	
6	Unirea Mânăstirea	30	12	5	13	42	60	−18	41	
7	Dunărea Grădiștea	30	12	3	15	51	80	−29	39	
8	Progresul Fundulea	30	11	4	15	70	91	−21	37	
9	Agricola Borcea	30	10	6	14	54	80	−26	36	
10	Steaua Radovanu	30	10	4	16	51	76	−25	34	
11	Victoria Dragoș Vodă	30	9	7	14	32	78	−46	34	
12	Victoria Lehliu	30	9	6	15	43	61	−18	33	
13	Avântul Dor Mărunt	30	10	1	19	49	105	−56	31	
14	Rapid Ulmeni	30	8	4	18	57	80	−23	28	
15	Partizanul Crivăț (R)	30	7	4	19	52	129	−77	25	Relegation to Liga V Călărași
16	Avântul Pietroiu (R)	30	6	6	18	45	121	−76	24	Relegation to Liga V Călărași

Rules for classification: 1) Points; 2) Head-to-head points; 3) Head-to-head goal difference; 4) Head-to-head goals scored; 5) Head-to-head away goals scored; 6) Goal difference; 7) Goals scored.
(C) Champions; (Q) Qualified for the phase indicated; (R) Relegated

=== Caraș-Severin County ===
Pos	Team	Pld	W	D	L	GF	GA	GD	Pts	Qualification or relegation
1	Voința Lupac (C, Q)	32	28	1	3	147	25	+122	85	Qualification to promotion play-off
2	CSM Școlar Reșița	32	27	2	3	130	26	+104	83	
3	Rapid Buchin	32	24	2	6	116	45	+71	74	
4	Oravița	32	24	0	8	117	50	+67	72	
5	Berzasca	32	18	4	10	64	57	+7	58	
6	Nera Bozovici	32	18	3	11	80	67	+13	57	
7	Bistra Glimboca	32	18	2	12	84	48	+36	56	
8	Minerul Anina	32	15	4	13	70	56	+14	49	
9	Ad Mediam Mehadia	32	13	2	17	62	71	−9	41	
10	Muncitorul Reșița	32	12	4	16	60	99	−39	40	
11	Moldova Nouă	32	11	3	18	52	96	−44	36	
12	Metalul Bocșa	32	9	6	17	47	75	−28	33	
13	Agmonia Zăvoi	32	8	5	19	51	108	−57	29	
14	Semenicul Văliug	32	8	2	22	67	129	−62	26	
15	Hercules Băile Herculane	32	6	2	24	24	82	−58	20 (Note: Hercules Băile Herculane and Oțelu Roșu withdrew before the start of the second part of the season and lost all the remaining matches with 0–3.)	
16	Oțelu Roșu	32	5	1	26	26	94	−68	16	
17	Voința Răcășdia	32	5	1	26	45	120	−75	16	

Rules for classification: 1) Points; 2) Head-to-head points; 3) Head-to-head goal difference; 4) Head-to-head goals scored; 5) Head-to-head away goals scored; 6) Goal difference; 7) Goals scored.
(C) Champions; (Q) Qualified for the phase indicated

=== Cluj County ===
Pos	Team	Pld	W	D	L	GF	GA	GD	Pts	Qualification or relegation
1	Potaissa 2011 Turda (C, Q)	24	18	3	3	77	27	+50	57	Qualification to promotion play-off
2	Vulturul Mintiu Gherlii	24	17	3	4	61	20	+41	54	
3	Universitatea Cluj II	24	15	5	4	78	23	+55	50	
4	Aghireșu	24	14	3	7	66	47	+19	45	
5	Someșul Gilău	24	13	4	7	56	38	+18	43	
6	Someșul Apahida	24	12	5	7	68	45	+23	41	
7	Plaiul Iacobeni	24	11	5	8	52	42	+10	38	
8	Unirea Florești	24	11	4	9	60	38	+22	37	
9	Unirea Tritenii de Jos	24	7	2	15	32	50	−18	23	
10	Minerul 2014 Iara	24	7	1	16	38	76	−38	22	
11	Armenopolis Gherla	24	5	5	14	35	62	−27	20	
12	CFR Dej	24	4	0	20	21	85	−64	12	
13	Pro Junior Cluj-Napoca	24	2	0	22	41	132	−91	6	

Rules for classification: 1) Points; 2) Head-to-head points; 3) Head-to-head goal difference; 4) Head-to-head goals scored; 5) Head-to-head away goals scored; 6) Goal difference; 7) Goals scored.
(C) Champions; (Q) Qualified for the phase indicated

=== Constanța County ===
==== Regular season ====
===== East Series =====
Pos	Team	Pld	W	D	L	GF	GA	GD	Pts	Qualification
1	Agigea	20	17	1	2	69	21	+48	52	Qualification to play-off
2	Eforie	20	13	3	4	57	28	+29	42	Qualification to play-off
3	Unirea Topraisar	20	10	5	5	66	28	+38	35	Qualification to play-off
4	Victoria Mihai Viteazu	20	10	5	5	54	31	+23	35	Qualification to play-off
5	Portul Constanța	20	11	2	7	41	24	+17	35	Qualification to play-off
6	Sparta Techirghiol	20	10	2	8	51	40	+11	32	Qualification to play-off
7	Avântul Comana	20	10	2	8	43	45	−2	32	Qualification to play-out
8	Victoria Cumpăna	20	8	4	8	39	39	0	28	Qualification to play-out
9	Vulturii Cazino Constanța	20	4	1	15	37	77	−40	13	Qualification to play-out
10	Litoral Corbu	19	2	3	14	15	52	−37	9 (Note: Litoral Corbu and Aurora 23 August withdrew from the championship after 12 rounds and lost all the remaining matches with 0–3.)	Qualification to play-out
11	Aurora 23 August	19	0	0	19	10	97	−87	0	Qualification to play-out
12	Cogealac (D)	0	0	0	0	0	0	0	0 (Note: Cogealac withdrew from the championship after 9 rounds and all its results were canceled.)	Withdrew

Rules for classification: 1) Points; 2) Head-to-head points; 3) Head-to-head goal difference; 4) Head-to-head goals scored; 5) Head-to-head away goals scored; 6) Goal difference; 7) Goals scored.
(D) Disqualified

===== West Series =====
Pos	Team	Pld	W	D	L	GF	GA	GD	Pts	Qualification
1	Viitorul Constanța II	20	19	1	0	113	6	+107	58	Qualification to play-off
2	Axiopolis Cernavodă	20	16	3	1	86	19	+67	51	Qualification to play-off
3	Gloria Băneasa	20	12	2	6	62	45	+17	38	Qualification to play-off
4	Dunărea Ostrov	20	10	3	7	53	33	+20	33	Qualification to play-off
5	Ovidiu	20	9	5	6	39	33	+6	32	Qualification to play-off
6	Mihail Kogălniceanu	20	10	2	8	58	57	+1	32	Qualification to play-off
7	CFR Constanța	20	8	3	9	41	42	−1	27	Qualification to play-out
8	Știința ACALAB Poarta Albă	20	5	1	14	39	76	−37	16	Qualification to play-out
9	Perla Murfatlar	20	4	0	16	31	99	−68	12	Qualification to play-out
10	Voința Valu lui Traian	20	3	2	15	28	87	−59	11	Qualification to play-out
11	Progresul Medgidia	20	3	0	17	30	83	−53	9 (Note: Progresul Medgidia withdrew from the championship after 20 rounds and lost all the matches from the second part of the regular season with 0–3.)	Qualification to play-out
12	Carsium Hârșova (D)	0	0	0	0	0	0	0	0 (Note: Carsium Hârșova withdrew from the championship in the first part of the regular season and all its results were canceled.)	Withdrew

Rules for classification: 1) Points; 2) Head-to-head points; 3) Head-to-head goal difference; 4) Head-to-head goals scored; 5) Head-to-head away goals scored; 6) Goal difference; 7) Goals scored.
(D) Disqualified

==== Championship play-off ====
The teams started the play-off with all the records achieved in the regular season and played only against the teams from the other series.

Pos	Team	Pld	W	D	L	GF	GA	GD	Pts	Qualification
1	Viitorul Constanța II (C, Q)	32	31	1	0	196	19	+177	94	Qualification to promotion play-off
2	Axiopolis Cernavodă	32	25	4	3	126	36	+90	79	
3	Agigea	32	22	4	6	25	37	−12	70	
4	Dunărea Ostrov	32	19	4	9	87	46	+41	61	
5	Gloria Băneasa	32	19	4	9	90	62	+28	61	
6	Eforie	32	18	4	10	83	67	+16	58	
7	Mihail Kogălniceanu	32	14	6	12	92	82	+10	48	
8	Ovidiu	32	14	6	12	76	66	+10	48	
9	Victoria Mihai Viteazu	32	13	8	11	76	59	+17	47	
10	Unirea Topraisar	32	13	5	14	87	74	+13	41 (Note: Unirea Topraisar deducted 3 points.)	
11	Portul Constanța	32	11	3	18	47	69	−22	36	
12	Sparta Techirghiol	32	11	3	18	69	104	−35	36	

Rules for classification: 1) Points; 2) Head-to-head points; 3) Head-to-head goal difference; 4) Head-to-head goals scored; 5) Head-to-head away goals scored; 6) Goal difference; 7) Goals scored.
(C) Champions; (Q) Qualified for the phase indicated

==== Championship play-out ====
The teams started the play-out with all the records achieved in the regular season and played only against the teams from the other series.

Pos	Team	Pld	W	D	L	GF	GA	GD	Pts	Qualification
13	Avântul Comana	30	18	2	10	74	56	+18	56	
14	CFR Constanța	30	17	3	10	76	61	+15	54	
15	Știința ACALAB Poarta Albă	30	13	2	15	72	85	−13	41	
16	Victoria Cumpăna (Note: Victoria Cumpăna was spared from relegation due to the promotion of Viitorul Constanța II to Liga III, .)	30	10	7	13	56	68	−12	37	Spared from relegation
17	Perla Murfatlar (R)	30	11	1	18	60	109	−49	34	Relegation to Liga V Constanța
18	Voința Valu lui Traian (R)	30	10	3	17	62	98	−36	33	Relegation to Liga V Constanța
19	Vulturii Cazino Constanța (R)	30	6	1	23	56	125	−69	19	Relegation to Liga V Constanța
20	Litoral Corbu (D)	27	2	3	22	15	76	−61	9 (Note: In this ranking, AJF Constanța included 3–0 victories of the seven teams from the play-out in the matches against the teams withdrawn from the championship, respectively with Litoral Corbu, Progresul Medgidia and Aurora 23 August.)	Withdrew
21	Progresul Medgidia (D)	26	3	0	23	30	101	−71	9	Withdrew
22	Aurora 23 August (D)	27	0	0	27	10	121	−111	0	Withdrew

Rules for classification: 1) Points; 2) Head-to-head points; 3) Head-to-head goal difference; 4) Head-to-head goals scored; 5) Head-to-head away goals scored; 6) Goal difference; 7) Goals scored.
(D) Disqualified; (R) Relegated

=== Covasna County ===
Pos	Team	Pld	W	D	L	GF	GA	GD	Pts	Qualification or relegation
1	Nemere Ghelința (C, Q)	28	22	1	5	85	22	+63	67	Qualification to promotion play-off
2	Brețcu	28	19	7	2	89	29	+60	64	
3	Viitorul Moacșa	28	16	7	5	73	47	+26	55	
4	Cernat	28	16	4	8	65	39	+26	49 (Note: Cernat deducted 3 points.)	
5	Avântul Ilieni	28	14	7	7	50	41	+9	49	
6	Ojdula	28	11	7	10	50	32	+18	40	
7	KSE Târgu Secuiesc	28	12	3	13	56	52	+4	39	
8	Prima Brăduț	28	11	5	12	62	53	+9	38	
9	Perko Sânzieni	28	10	3	15	42	56	−14	33	
10	Progresul Sita Buzăului	28	10	2	16	39	84	−45	32	
11	BSE Belin	28	10	1	17	40	72	−32	31	
12	Baraolt	28	8	4	16	36	63	−27	28	
13	Harghita Aita Mare	28	7	5	16	52	70	−18	26	
14	Venus Ozun	28	7	2	19	39	76	−37	23	
15	Ciucașul Întorsura Buzăului (R)	28	6	4	18	34	76	−42	22	Relegation to Liga V Covasna
16	Stăruința Bodoc (D)	0	0	0	0	0	0	0	0 (Note: Stăruința Bodoc withdrew from championship and all its results were canceled.)	Withdrew

Rules for classification: 1) Points; 2) Head-to-head points; 3) Head-to-head goal difference; 4) Head-to-head goals scored; 5) Head-to-head away goals scored; 6) Goal difference; 7) Goals scored.
(C) Champions; (D) Disqualified; (Q) Qualified for the phase indicated; (R) Relegated

=== Dâmbovița County ===
Pos	Team	Pld	W	D	L	GF	GA	GD	Pts	Qualification or relegation
1	Aninoasa (C, Q)	34	30	2	2	129	28	+101	92	Qualification to promotion play-off
2	Flacăra Moreni	34	29	2	3	125	23	+102	89	
3	Avicola Tărtășești	34	19	7	8	88	45	+43	64	
4	Bradul Moroeni	34	17	7	10	83	52	+31	58	
5	Recolta Gura Șuții	34	18	2	14	70	65	+5	56	
6	Comerțul Brezoaele	34	16	6	12	70	77	−7	54	
7	Voința Perșinari	34	16	5	13	67	66	+1	53	
8	Voința Crevedia	34	15	7	12	88	56	+32	52	
9	Atletic Fieni	34	15	6	13	86	61	+25	51	
10	Luceafărul Dragomirești	34	13	3	18	80	91	−11	42	
11	Petrești	34	13	2	19	54	86	−32	40 (Note: Petrești, Progresul Mătăsaru and Avântul Produlești deducted 1 point.)	
12	Săgeata Cătunu	34	12	4	18	68	82	−14	40	
13	Petrolul Târgoviște	34	10	8	16	70	80	−10	38	
14	Libertatea Urziceanca	34	12	4	18	62	97	−35	37 (Note: Libertatea Urziceanca deducted 3 points.)	
15	Unirea Cobia	34	11	4	19	52	107	−55	37	
16	PAS Pucioasa (Note: PAS Pucioasa was spared from relegation due to the promotion of Aninoasa to Liga III.)	34	9	9	16	48	75	−27	36	Spared from relegation
17	Progresul Mătăsaru (R)	34	5	5	24	44	117	−73	19	Relegation to Liga V Dâmbovița
18	Avântul Produlești (R)	34	4	1	29	22	100	−78	12	Relegation to Liga V Dâmbovița

Rules for classification: 1) Points; 2) Head-to-head points; 3) Head-to-head goal difference; 4) Head-to-head goals scored; 5) Head-to-head away goals scored; 6) Goal difference; 7) Goals scored.
(C) Champions; (Q) Qualified for the phase indicated; (R) Relegated

=== Dolj County ===
==== Regular season ====
Pos	Team	Pld	W	D	L	GF	GA	GD	Pts	Qualification or relegation
1	Universitatea Craiova II	22	17	3	2	85	15	+70	54	Qualification to play-off
2	Dunărea Calafat	22	17	0	5	71	20	+51	51	Qualification to play-off
3	Dunărea Bistreț	22	16	0	6	77	23	+54	48	Qualification to play-off
4	Viitorul Cârcea	22	15	2	5	62	35	+27	47	Qualification to play-off
5	Progresul Segarcea	22	13	4	5	57	23	+34	43	Qualification to play-off
6	Știința Danubius Bechet	22	13	2	7	54	42	+12	41	Qualification to play-off
7	Unirea Leamna	22	9	2	11	35	55	−20	29	Qualification to play-out
8	Recolta Ostroveni	22	7	3	12	35	53	−18	24	Qualification to play-out
9	Știința Malu Mare	22	6	1	15	32	60	−28	19	Qualification to play-out
10	Victoria Știința Celaru	22	4	0	18	30	79	−49	12	Qualification to play-out
11	Amaradia Melinești	22	2	3	17	17	71	−54	9 (Note: Amaradia Melinești withdrew in the second part of the Regular season and lost all remaining matches with 0–3.)	Qualification to play-out
12	Vânătorul Desa	22	2	2	18	24	103	−79	8	Qualification to play-out

Rules for classification: 1) Points; 2) Head-to-head points; 3) Head-to-head goal difference; 4) Head-to-head goals scored; 5) Head-to-head away goals scored; 6) Goal difference; 7) Goals scored.

==== Championship play-off ====
The results between the qualified teams was maintained in the championship play-off.

Pos	Team	Pld	W	D	L	GF	GA	GD	Pts	Qualification
1	Universitatea Craiova II (C, Q)	20	12	6	2	61	22	+39	42	Qualification for promotion play-off
2	Viitorul Cârcea	20	11	3	6	42	39	+3	36	
3	Dunărea Calafat	20	11	2	7	39	24	+15	35	
4	Dunărea Bistreț	20	7	1	12	32	42	−10	22	
5	Știința Danubius Bechet	20	5	3	12	26	58	−32	18	
6	Progresul Segarcea	20	5	3	12	34	49	−15	18	

Rules for classification: 1) Points; 2) Head-to-head points; 3) Head-to-head goal difference; 4) Head-to-head goals scored; 5) Head-to-head away goals scored; 6) Goal difference; 7) Goals scored.
(C) Champions; (Q) Qualified for the phase indicated

==== Championship play-out ====
The results between the qualified teams was maintained in the championship play-out.

Pos	Team	Pld	W	D	L	GF	GA	GD	Pts	Relegation
7	Recolta Ostroveni	16	9	1	6	41	34	+7	28	
8	Unirea Leamna	16	9	1	6	40	31	+9	28	
9	Victoria Știința Celaru	16	9	0	7	47	32	+15	27	
10	Știința Malu Mare	16	7	2	7	32	40	−8	23	
11	Vânătorul Desa (R)	16	3	2	11	31	54	−23	11	Relegation to Liga V Dolj
12	Amaradia Melinești (D)	0	0	0	0	0	0	0	0 (Note: Amaradia Melinești withdrew in the second part of the Regular season.)	Withdrew

Rules for classification: 1) Points; 2) Head-to-head points; 3) Head-to-head goal difference; 4) Head-to-head goals scored; 5) Head-to-head away goals scored; 6) Goal difference; 7) Goals scored.
(D) Disqualified; (R) Relegated

=== Galați County ===
Pos	Team	Pld	W	D	L	GF	GA	GD	Pts	Qualification or relegation
1	Avântul Valea Mărului	26	21	4	1	113	26	+87	67	Qualification to promotion play-off
2	Fulgerul Smulți	26	16	2	8	76	35	+41	50	
3	Quantum Club Galați	26	15	5	6	81	48	+33	50	
4	Gloria Ivești	26	14	6	6	99	42	+57	48	
5	Avântul Vânatori	26	15	3	8	63	48	+15	48	
6	Unirea Braniștea	26	13	8	5	74	41	+33	47	
7	Muncitorul Ghidigeni	26	14	4	8	84	49	+35	46	
8	Luceafărul Petrolul Schela	26	11	3	12	73	73	0	36	
9	Victoria Independența	26	11	3	12	76	80	−4	36	
10	Viitorul Costache Negri	26	8	6	12	68	73	−5	30	
11	Avântul Drăgănești	26	7	5	14	56	91	−35	26	
12	Juventus 2007 Toflea	26	5	7	14	47	71	−24	22	
13	Bujorii Târgu Bujor	26	2	2	22	36	134	−98	8	
14	Avântul Matca	26	1	0	25	27	162	−135	3	

Rules for classification: 1) Points; 2) Head-to-head points; 3) Head-to-head goal difference; 4) Head-to-head goals scored; 5) Head-to-head away goals scored; 6) Goal difference; 7) Goals scored.

=== Giurgiu County ===
==== South Series ====
Pos	Team	Pld	W	D	L	GF	GA	GD	Pts	Qualification or relegation
1	Unirea Izvoarele (Q)	24	20	2	2	102	19	+83	62	Qualification to championship play-off
2	Arsenal Malu (Q)	24	19	4	1	101	14	+87	61	Qualification to championship play-off
3	Viitorul Vedea	24	15	2	7	56	37	+19	47	
4	Dunărea Giurgiu	24	13	1	10	50	43	+7	40	
5	Argeșul Hotarele	24	13	1	10	64	59	+5	40	
6	Mihai Viteazu Călugăreni	24	12	2	10	66	50	+16	38	
7	Dunărea Oinacu	24	9	4	11	34	44	−10	31	
8	Spicul Izvoru	24	10	3	11	47	65	−18	30 (Note: Spicul Izvoru deducted 3 points.)	
9	Voința Slobozia	24	7	5	12	45	82	−37	26	
10	Real Colibași	24	7	2	15	47	86	−39	23	
11	Prundu	24	5	3	16	51	77	−26	18	
12	Progresul Valea Dragului	24	5	1	18	33	75	−42	16	
13	Real Vărăști	24	5	2	17	50	95	−45	11 (Note: Real Vărăști deducted 6 points.)	

Rules for classification: 1) Points; 2) Head-to-head points; 3) Head-to-head goal difference; 4) Head-to-head goals scored; 5) Head-to-head away goals scored; 6) Goal difference; 7) Goals scored.
(Q) Qualified for the phase indicated

==== North Series ====
Pos	Team	Pld	W	D	L	GF	GA	GD	Pts	Qualification or relegation
1	Argeșul Mihăilești (Q)	24	17	7	0	77	22	+55	58	Qualification to championship play-off
2	Zmeii Ogrezeni (Q)	24	15	5	4	94	43	+51	50	Qualification to championship play-off
3	Petrolul Roata Cartojani	24	13	6	5	55	28	+27	45	
4	Silver Inter Zorile	24	13	3	8	55	41	+14	42	
5	Avântul Florești	24	9	9	6	50	38	+12	36	
6	Buturugeni	24	9	7	8	57	56	+1	34	
7	Voința Podișor	24	10	3	11	58	57	+1	33	
8	Bolintin Malu Spart	24	9	3	12	58	80	−22	30	
9	Olimpia Mârșa	24	8	3	13	59	64	−5	27	
10	Unirea Cosoba	24	8	5	11	35	53	−18	23 (Note: Unirea Cosoba and Naipu deducted 6 points.)	
11	Crevedia Mare	24	6	1	17	36	94	−58	19	
12	Naipu	24	6	3	15	55	70	−15	15	
13	Luceafărul Trestieni	24	4	3	17	48	91	−43	11 (Note: Luceafărul Trestieni deducted 4 points.)	

Rules for classification: 1) Points; 2) Head-to-head points; 3) Head-to-head goal difference; 4) Head-to-head goals scored; 5) Head-to-head away goals scored; 6) Goal difference; 7) Goals scored.
(Q) Qualified for the phase indicated

==== Championship play-off ====
The championship play-off played between the best two ranked teams in each series of the regular season. All matches were played at Marin Anastasovici Stadium in Giurgiu on 9 and 10 June 2015 the semi-finals and on 14 June 2015 the final.

===== Semi-finals =====
Team 1	Score	Team 2
Arsenal Malu	3–1	Argeșul Mihăilești
Unirea Izvoarele	3–0	Zmeii Ogrezeni

===== Final =====
Team 1	Score	Team 2
Arsenal Malu	2–0	Unirea Izvoarele

Arsenal Malu won the 2014–15 Liga IV Giurgiu County and qualify to promotion play-off in Liga III.

=== Gorj County ===
Pos	Team	Pld	W	D	L	GF	GA	GD	Pts	Qualification or relegation
1	Gilortul Târgu Cărbunești (C, Q)	24	21	1	2	70	19	+51	64	Qualification to promotion play-off
2	Unirea Crușeț	24	16	1	7	62	44	+18	49	
3	Internațional Bălești	24	13	7	4	55	26	+29	46	
4	Vulturii Fărcășești	24	13	2	9	45	34	+11	41	
5	Petrolul Stoina	24	12	5	7	39	34	+5	41	
6	Știința Hurezeni	24	11	4	9	48	38	+10	37	
7	Viitorul Negomir	24	8	7	9	61	46	+15	31	
8	Petrofac Țicleni	24	8	5	11	49	46	+3	29	
9	Energetica Tismana	24	7	4	13	35	60	−25	25	
10	Parângul Bumbești-Jiu	24	7	4	13	38	47	−9	25	
11	Minerul Mătăsari II	24	6	6	12	34	49	−15	24	
12	Avântul Bărbătești (R)	24	7	2	15	49	72	−23	23	Relegation to Liga V Gorj
13	Stejari (R)	24	1	2	21	14	91	−77	5	Relegation to Liga V Gorj

Rules for classification: 1) Points; 2) Head-to-head points; 3) Head-to-head goal difference; 4) Head-to-head goals scored; 5) Head-to-head away goals scored; 6) Goal difference; 7) Goals scored.
(C) Champions; (Q) Qualified for the phase indicated; (R) Relegated

=== Harghita County ===
Pos	Team	Pld	W	D	L	GF	GA	GD	Pts	Qualification or relegation
1	Odorheiu Secuiesc (C, Q)	22	19	2	1	99	24	+75	59	Qualification to promotion play-off
2	Miercurea Ciuc II	22	19	1	2	108	14	+94	58	
3	Hargita Cârța	22	12	3	7	53	37	+16	39	
4	Homorod Merești	22	11	2	9	48	51	−3	35	
5	Viitorul Gheorgheni	22	11	0	11	43	62	−19	33	
6	Roseal Odorheiu Secuiesc	22	9	2	11	51	42	+9	29	
7	Unirea Cristuru Secuiesc	22	9	1	12	46	58	−12	28	
8	MÜ Frumoasa	22	8	3	11	40	59	−19	27	
9	Szefite Sânsimion	22	8	2	12	57	65	−8	26	
10	Știința Sărmaș Toplița	22	7	3	12	41	78	−37	18 (Note: Știința Sărmaș Toplița and Lunca de Sus were deducted 6 points.)	
11	Siculeni (R)	22	4	2	16	25	72	−47	14	Relegation to Liga V Harghita
12	Lunca de Sus (R)	22	4	1	17	19	68	−49	7	Relegation to Liga V Harghita

Rules for classification: 1) Points; 2) Head-to-head points; 3) Head-to-head goal difference; 4) Head-to-head goals scored; 5) Head-to-head away goals scored; 6) Goal difference; 7) Goals scored.
(C) Champions; (Q) Qualified for the phase indicated; (R) Relegated

=== Hunedoara County ===
Pos	Team	Pld	W	D	L	GF	GA	GD	Pts	Qualification or relegation
1	Cetate Deva (C, Q)	28	24	2	2	117	27	+90	74	Qualification to promotion play-off
2	Hercules Lupeni	28	21	4	3	81	20	+61	67	
3	Șoimul Băița	28	19	6	3	85	36	+49	63	
4	Inter Petrila	28	17	2	9	61	43	+18	53	
5	Vulcan	28	17	1	10	70	42	+28	52	
6	Gloria Geoagiu	28	16	4	8	55	40	+15	52	
7	Aurul Brad	28	13	2	13	46	42	+4	41	
8	Aurul Certej	28	11	4	13	64	66	−2	37	
9	Jiul Petroșani	28	8	7	13	40	48	−8	31	
10	Universitatea Petroșani	28	7	8	13	43	60	−17	29	
11	Victoria Călan	28	6	8	14	44	76	−32	26	
12	Retezatul Hațeg	28	7	3	18	39	61	−22	24	
13	Dacia Orăștie	28	5	5	18	43	84	−41	20	
14	Minerul Uricani	28	3	7	18	26	84	−58	16	
15	Metalul Crișcior	28	3	3	22	25	110	−85	12	

Rules for classification: 1) Points; 2) Head-to-head points; 3) Head-to-head goal difference; 4) Head-to-head goals scored; 5) Head-to-head away goals scored; 6) Goal difference; 7) Goals scored.
(C) Champions; (Q) Qualified for the phase indicated

=== Ialomița County ===
Pos	Team	Pld	W	D	L	GF	GA	GD	Pts	Qualification or relegation
1	Unirea Fierbinți (C, Q)	30	26	0	4	130	53	+77	78	Qualification to promotion play-off
2	Victoria Munteni-Buzău	30	22	1	7	93	37	+56	67	
3	Victoria Țăndărei	30	20	5	5	101	43	+58	65	
4	Abatorul Slobozia	30	20	3	7	120	58	+62	63	
5	Recolta Gheorghe Doja	30	19	2	9	111	63	+48	59	
6	Recolta Gheorghe Lazăr	30	17	5	8	84	62	+22	56	
7	Andrias Andrășești	30	13	5	12	77	67	+10	44	
8	Amara	30	13	1	16	69	86	−17	40	
9	Recolta Bărcănești	30	11	4	15	74	87	−13	37	
10	Viitorul Axintele II	30	11	3	16	68	65	+3	36	
11	Olimpia Rădulești	30	11	2	17	65	92	−27	35	
12	Traian	30	10	1	19	68	108	−40	31	
13	Spicul Colilia	30	9	3	18	56	97	−41	30 (Note: Voința Reviga–Spicul Colilia 3–1; Spicul Colilia–Voința Reviga 3–0.)	
14	Voința Reviga (R)	30	9	3	18	63	102	−39	30	Relegation to Liga V Ialomița
15	Unirea Mihail Kogălniceanu (R)	30	7	2	21	74	137	−63	23	Relegation to Liga V Ialomița
16	Viticola Agrofam Fetești (R)	30	2	0	28	28	124	−96	6 (Note: Viticola Agrofam Fetești withdrew after 19 rounds and lost all remaining matches with 0–3.)	Relegation to Liga V Ialomița

Rules for classification: 1) Points; 2) Head-to-head points; 3) Head-to-head goal difference; 4) Head-to-head goals scored; 5) Head-to-head away goals scored; 6) Goal difference; 7) Goals scored.
(C) Champions; (Q) Qualified for the phase indicated; (R) Relegated

=== Iași County ===
Pos	Team	Pld	W	D	L	GF	GA	GD	Pts	Qualification or relegation
1	Unirea Mircești (C, Q)	31	27	2	2	85	30	+55	83	Qualification to promotion play-off
2	Rapid Dumești	31	27	1	3	80	20	+60	82	
3	Siretul Lespezi	31	19	5	7	74	35	+39	62	
4	Stejarul Sinești	31	19	2	10	80	42	+38	59	
5	Venus Butea	31	18	4	9	66	36	+30	58	
6	Viitorul Hârlău	31	18	2	11	67	47	+20	56	
7	Tomești	31	17	1	13	70	71	−1	52	
8	Viitorul Târgu Frumos (R)	31	15	3	13	47	42	+5	48 (Note: Viitorul Târgu Frumos withdrew after 22 rounds and lost all the remaining matches with 0–3)	Relegation to Liga V Iași
9	Viitorul Lungani	31	12	3	16	52	49	+3	39	
10	Unirea Ruginoasa	31	12	1	18	54	61	−7	37	
11	Forța Podu Iloaiei	31	11	2	18	56	78	−22	35	
12	Gloria Bălțați	31	9	3	19	59	69	−10	30	
13	Pașcani II	31	9	3	19	63	82	−19	30	
14	Gloria Balș	31	8	5	18	36	72	−36	29	
15	Partizanii Bârnova (R)	31	7	1	23	22	76	−54	22 (Note: Partizanii Bârnova was excluded from the championship.)	Relegation to Liga V Iași
16	Holboca	31	4	2	25	34	107	−73	14	
17	Podgoria Cotnari (D)	16	2	0	14	22	62	−40	6 (Note: Podgoria Cotnari withdrew during the winter break.)	Withdrew

Rules for classification: 1) Points; 2) Head-to-head points; 3) Head-to-head goal difference; 4) Head-to-head goals scored; 5) Head-to-head away goals scored; 6) Goal difference; 7) Goals scored.
(C) Champions; (D) Disqualified; (Q) Qualified for the phase indicated; (R) Relegated

=== Ilfov County ===
==== Seria 1 ====
Pos	Team	Pld	W	D	L	GF	GA	GD	Pts	Qualification or relegation
1	Voluntari II (Q)	22	20	2	0	126	11	+115	62	Qualification to championship play-off
2	Voința Periș (Q)	22	15	4	3	63	20	+43	49	Qualification to championship play-off
3	Athletico Floreasca	22	13	5	4	82	33	+49	44	
4	Ștefănești II	22	11	6	5	62	59	+3	39	
5	Pescărușul Grădiștea	22	11	5	6	73	44	+29	38	
6	Viitorul Petrăchioaia	22	8	4	10	50	59	−9	28	
7	Waltex Cosoba	22	9	1	12	40	67	−27	28	
8	Voința Snagov II	22	7	3	12	44	79	−35	24	
9	Gloria Buriaș	22	6	4	12	43	71	−28	22	
10	Gloria Islaz	22	4	8	10	45	69	−24	20	
11	Viitorul Găneasa	22	4	3	15	38	87	−49	15	
12	Codrii Vlăsiei Moara Vlăsiei	22	1	1	20	16	83	−67	4 (Note: Codrii Vlăsiei Moara Vlăsiei withdrew in the second part of the season and lost all the remaining matches with 0–3.)	

Rules for classification: 1) Points; 2) Head-to-head points; 3) Head-to-head goal difference; 4) Head-to-head goals scored; 5) Head-to-head away goals scored; 6) Goal difference; 7) Goals scored.
(Q) Qualified for the phase indicated

==== Seria 2 ====
Pos	Team	Pld	W	D	L	GF	GA	GD	Pts	Qualification or relegation
1	Voința Buftea (Q)	22	20	2	0	122	17	+105	62	Qualification to championship play-off
2	Viitorul Dragomirești-Vale (Q)	22	18	2	2	83	18	+65	56	Qualification to championship play-off
3	Ciorogârla	22	13	3	6	62	38	+24	42	
4	Glina	22	11	5	6	47	39	+8	38	
5	Măgurele	22	11	3	8	56	54	+2	36	
6	Cornetu	22	11	2	9	45	30	+15	35	
7	Viitorul Domnești II	22	11	2	9	47	36	+11	35	
8	Vulturul Pasărea	22	6	3	13	42	78	−36	21	
9	Dărăști	22	5	4	13	21	72	−51	19	
10	Inter Popești-Leordeni	20	5	2	13	28	55	−27	17 (Note: Inter Popești-Leordeni, Sinești and Inter Clinceni II withdrew in the second part of the season and lost all the remaining matches with 0–3.)	
11	Sinești	20	2	2	16	16	69	−53	8	
12	Inter Clinceni II	20	1	0	19	20	83	−63	3	

Rules for classification: 1) Points; 2) Head-to-head points; 3) Head-to-head goal difference; 4) Head-to-head goals scored; 5) Head-to-head away goals scored; 6) Goal difference; 7) Goals scored.
(Q) Qualified for the phase indicated

==== Championship play-off ====
The Championship play-off will be played between the first two teams from each series of the regular season.

===== Semi-finals =====
Team 1	Score	Team 2
Viitorul Dragomirești-Vale	1–2	Voluntari II
Voința Periș	w/o (Note: Voința Buftea withdrew before the start of the play-off.)	Voința Buftea

===== Final =====
Team 1	Score	Team 2
Voluntari II	w/o (Note: Voința Periș did not pay the necessary scales to participate in the play-off.)	Voința Periș

Voluntari II won the 2014–15 Liga IV Ilfov County and qualify to promotion play-off in Liga III.

=== Maramureș County ===
==== North Series ====
Pos	Team	Pld	W	D	L	GF	GA	GD	Pts	Qualification or relegation
1	Bradul Vișeu de Sus (Q)	22	19	1	2	82	18	+64	58	Qualification to championship final
2	Iza Dragomirești	22	18	3	1	96	21	+75	57	
3	Avântul Bârsana	22	15	3	4	80	31	+49	48	
4	Zorile Moisei	22	12	3	7	65	48	+17	39	
5	Brișca Sarasău	22	11	4	7	61	48	+13	37	
6	Salina Ocna Șugatag	22	8	1	13	40	70	−30	25	
7	Rozalina Rozavlea	22	8	1	13	33	71	−38	25	
8	Foresta Câmpulung la Tisa	22	7	2	13	39	67	−28	23	
9	Remeți	22	6	3	13	43	57	−14	21	
10	Metalul Bogdan Vodă	22	5	3	14	31	63	−32	18	
11	Recolta Săliștea de Sus	22	5	2	15	39	85	−46	17	
12	Luceafărul Strâmtura	22	4	2	16	36	66	−30	14	

Rules for classification: 1) Points; 2) Head-to-head points; 3) Head-to-head goal difference; 4) Head-to-head goals scored; 5) Head-to-head away goals scored; 6) Goal difference; 7) Goals scored.
(Q) Qualified for the phase indicated

==== South Series ====
Pos	Team	Pld	W	D	L	GF	GA	GD	Pts	Qualification or relegation
1	Comuna Recea (Q)	22	19	2	1	89	19	+70	59	Qualification to championship final
2	Viitorul Ulmeni	22	18	1	3	98	26	+72	55	
3	Fărcașa	22	18	1	3	74	29	+45	55	
4	Spicul Ardusat	22	14	1	7	86	37	+49	43	
5	Unirea Șișești	22	11	2	9	50	43	+7	35	
6	Seini	22	8	3	11	35	43	−8	27	
7	Progresul Șomcuta Mare	22	8	2	12	47	60	−13	26	
8	Gloria Chechiș	22	7	4	11	40	56	−16	25	
9	Comuna Satulung	22	7	0	15	41	83	−42	21	
10	Lăpușul Târgu Lăpuș	22	6	1	15	35	50	−15	19	
11	Dumbrăviţa	22	5	1	16	22	76	−54	16	
12	Minerul Cavnic	22	2	0	20	24	119	−95	6	

Rules for classification: 1) Points; 2) Head-to-head points; 3) Head-to-head goal difference; 4) Head-to-head goals scored; 5) Head-to-head away goals scored; 6) Goal difference; 7) Goals scored.
(Q) Qualified for the phase indicated

==== Championship final ====
The championship final was played on 6 June 2015 at Viorel Mateianu Stadium in Baia Mare.

Team 1	Score	Team 2
Comuna Recea	2–1	Bradul Vișeu de Sus

Comuna Recea won the 2014–15 Liga IV Maramureș County and qualify to promotion play-off in Liga III.

=== Mehedinți County ===
Pos	Team	Pld	W	D	L	GF	GA	GD	Pts	Qualification or relegation
1	Pandurii Cerneți (C, Q)	28	27	1	0	110	28	+82	82	Qualification to promotion play-off
2	Recolta Dănceu	28	21	1	6	101	30	+71	64	
3	Turnu Severin	28	13	4	11	70	44	+26	43	
4	Strehaia	28	14	1	13	64	56	+8	43	
5	Corcova	28	13	0	15	62	98	−36	39	
6	Viitorul Cujmir	28	10	2	16	42	64	−22	32	
7	Drobeta	28	4	2	22	25	95	−70	14 (Note: Drobeta excluded from the championship after 22 rounds and lost all the remaining matches with 0–3.)	
8	Dunărea Gruia	28	1	1	26	15	92	−77	4 (Note: Dunărea Gruia excluded from the championship after 26 rounds and lost all the remaining matches with 0–3.)	

Rules for classification: 1) Points; 2) Head-to-head points; 3) Head-to-head goal difference; 4) Head-to-head goals scored; 5) Head-to-head away goals scored; 6) Goal difference; 7) Goals scored.
(C) Champions; (Q) Qualified for the phase indicated

=== Mureș County ===
Pos	Team	Pld	W	D	L	GF	GA	GD	Pts	Qualification or relegation
1	Viitorul Ungheni (C, Q)	34	25	4	5	124	48	+76	79	Qualification to promotion play-off
2	ASA 2013 Târgu Mureș II	34	25	3	6	109	22	+87	78	
3	Mureșul Luduș	34	23	6	5	126	32	+94	75	
4	Mureșul Rușii-Munți	34	20	6	8	82	44	+38	66	
5	Lacul Ursu Mobila Sovata	34	19	3	12	111	61	+50	60	
6	Unirea Tricolor Târnăveni	34	16	10	8	86	56	+30	58	
7	Mureșul Cuci	34	17	7	10	78	51	+27	58	
8	Gaz Metan Târgu Mureș	34	14	10	10	81	71	+10	52	
9	Avântul Miheșu de Câmpie	34	14	10	10	78	71	+7	52	
10	Miercurea Nirajului	34	15	6	13	88	69	+19	51	
11	MSE 08 Târgu Mureș	34	15	5	14	74	86	−12	50	
12	Gaz Metan Daneș	34	13	2	19	83	133	−50	38 (Note: Gaz Metan Daneș deducted 3 points)	
13	Mureșul Nazna	34	10	5	19	61	96	−35	35	
14	Sărmașu	34	10	4	20	55	92	−37	34	
15	Înfrățirea Valea Izvoarelor	34	9	4	21	56	89	−33	31	
16	Gliga Companies Reghin (R)	33	6	4	23	33	78	−45	22 (Note: Gliga Companies Reghin and Unirea Iclănzel withdrew in the second part of the season and lost all the remaining matches with 0–3.)	Relegation to Liga V Mureș
17	Arena Sighișoara (R)	34	3	3	28	40	175	−135	12	Relegation to Liga V Mureș
18	Unirea Iclănzel (R)	33	2	2	29	26	133	−107	8	Relegation to Liga V Mureș

Rules for classification: 1) Points; 2) Head-to-head points; 3) Head-to-head goal difference; 4) Head-to-head goals scored; 5) Head-to-head away goals scored; 6) Goal difference; 7) Goals scored.
(C) Champions; (Q) Qualified for the phase indicated; (R) Relegated

=== Neamț County ===
Pos	Team	Pld	W	D	L	GF	GA	GD	Pts	Qualification or relegation
1	Speranța Răucești (Q)	26	23	2	1	110	26	+84	71	Qualification to championship play-off
2	Voința Ion Creangă (Q)	26	18	5	3	100	30	+70	59	Qualification to championship play-off
3	Victoria Horia (Q)	26	17	5	4	75	18	+57	56	Qualification to championship play-off
4	Bradul Borca (Q)	26	16	3	7	86	32	+54	51	Qualification to championship play-off
5	Moldova Cordun	26	15	6	5	71	27	+44	51	
6	Tineretul Cândești	26	16	2	8	66	37	+29	50	
7	Cimentul Bicaz	26	12	3	11	66	46	+20	39	
8	Lupii Bistriței Alexandru cel Bun	26	13	0	13	59	64	−5	39	
9	Grumăzești	26	8	4	14	51	68	−17	28	
10	Unirea Tămășeni	26	7	0	19	41	117	−76	21	
11	Viitorul Podoleni	26	6	1	19	50	106	−56	19	
12	Arsenal Văleni	26	6	0	20	46	118	−72	18	
13	Cetatea Târgu Neamț II	26	5	2	19	32	62	−30	17	
14	LPS Roman	26	3	1	22	24	126	−102	10	
15	Bradul Roznov (D)	0	0	0	0	0	0	0	0 (Note: Bradul Roznov withdrew after 6 rounds and all its results were canceled.)	Withdrew
16	Voința Valea Ursului (D)	0	0	0	0	0	0	0	0 (Note: Voința Valea Ursului withdrew after 1st round and its result were canceled.)	Withdrew

Rules for classification: 1) Points; 2) Head-to-head points; 3) Head-to-head goal difference; 4) Head-to-head goals scored; 5) Head-to-head away goals scored; 6) Goal difference; 7) Goals scored.
(D) Disqualified; (Q) Qualified for the phase indicated

==== Championship play-off ====
Championship play-off played in a single round-robin tournament between the best four teams of the regular season. The teams started the play-off with the following points: 1st place – 3 points, 2nd place – 2 points, 3rd place – 1 point, 4th place – 0 points.

All matches were played at Cetatea Stadium from Târgu Neamț.

Pos	Team	Pld	W	D	L	GF	GA	GD	Pts	Qualification	SPR	VIC	VHO	BBO
1	Speranța Răucești (C, Q)	3	2	0	1	4	4	0	9	Qualification for promotion play-off	—	1–0	1–3	2–1
2	Voința Ion Creangă	3	1	0	2	3	6	−3	5		—	—	1–0	2–5
3	Victoria Horia	3	1	1	1	4	3	+1	5		—	—	—	1–1
4	Bradul Borca	3	1	1	1	7	5	+2	4		—	—	—	—

Rules for classification: 1) Points; 2) Head-to-head points; 3) Head-to-head goal difference; 4) Head-to-head goals scored; 5) Head-to-head away goals scored; 6) Goal difference; 7) Goals scored.
(C) Champions; (Q) Qualified for the phase indicated

=== Olt County ===
Pos	Team	Pld	W	D	L	GF	GA	GD	Pts	Qualification or relegation
1	Milcov (Q)	22	18	3	1	107	14	+93	57	Qualification to championship play-off
2	Petrolul Potcoava (Q)	22	15	4	3	57	23	+34	49	Qualification to championship play-off
3	Recolta Stoicănești (Q)	22	15	1	6	54	27	+27	46	Qualification to championship play-off
4	Avântul Coteana (Q)	22	11	4	7	53	44	+9	37	Qualification to championship play-off
5	Vedița Colonești (Q)	22	12	0	10	44	37	+7	36	Qualification to championship play-off
6	Voința 2012 Băbiciu (Q)	22	10	5	7	50	41	+9	35	Qualification to championship play-off
7	Viitorul Grădinile	22	9	6	7	46	32	+14	33	
8	Victoria Dobrun	22	7	5	10	33	45	−12	26	
9	Viitorul Rusănești	22	7	2	13	44	85	−41	23	
10	Oltul Curtișoara	22	6	3	13	52	70	−18	21	
11	Olt Scornicești	22	3	1	18	28	82	−54	10	
12	Olimpia Rotunda	22	2	0	20	13	81	−68	6	
13	Vedea Văleni (D)	0	0	0	0	0	0	0	0 (Note: Vedea Văleni withdrew in the first part of the season and all its results were canceled.)	Withdrew

Rules for classification: 1) Points; 2) Head-to-head points; 3) Head-to-head goal difference; 4) Head-to-head goals scored; 5) Head-to-head away goals scored; 6) Goal difference; 7) Goals scored.
(D) Disqualified; (Q) Qualified for the phase indicated

==== Championship play-off ====
Pos	Team	Pld	W	D	L	GF	GA	GD	Pts	Qualification
1	Milcov (C, Q)	10	10	0	0	34	8	+26	87	Qualification to promotion play-off
2	Petrolul Potcoava	10	5	2	3	26	20	+6	66	
3	Vedița Colonești	10	5	2	3	22	16	+6	53	
4	Avântul Coteana	10	4	0	6	19	22	−3	49	
5	Voința 2012 Băbiciu	10	4	0	6	18	23	−5	47	
6	Recolta Stoicănești	10	0	0	10	0	30	−30	46	

Rules for classification: 1) Points; 2) Head-to-head points; 3) Head-to-head goal difference; 4) Head-to-head goals scored; 5) Head-to-head away goals scored; 6) Goal difference; 7) Goals scored.
(C) Champions; (Q) Qualified for the phase indicated

=== Prahova County ===
Pos	Team	Pld	W	D	L	GF	GA	GD	Pts	Qualification or relegation
1	Petrolistul Boldești (C, Q)	32	31	0	1	119	12	+107	93	Qualification to promotion play-off
2	Blejoi	32	22	6	4	96	18	+78	72	
3	Păulești	32	22	4	6	113	25	+88	70	
4	Plopeni	32	23	1	8	79	28	+51	70	
5	Bănești-Urleta	32	20	2	10	83	39	+44	62	
6	Teleajenul Vălenii de Munte	32	16	8	8	63	45	+18	56	
7	Tricolorul Breaza	32	17	4	11	77	47	+30	55	
8	Progresul Drăgănești	32	16	4	12	57	56	+1	52	
9	Avântul Măneciu	32	15	4	13	84	49	+35	49	
10	Cornu	32	15	2	15	54	68	−14	47	
11	Fortuna Poiana Câmpina II	32	13	7	12	49	47	+2	46	
12	Ceptura	32	7	5	20	36	97	−61	26	
13	Unirea Cocorăștii Colț	32	8	1	23	31	88	−57	25	
14	Brebu	32	6	6	20	42	103	−61	24	
15	Voința Găzarul Surani (R)	32	7	3	22	44	114	−70	24	Relegation to Liga V Prahova
16	Prahova Târgșorul Vechi (R)	32	3	3	26	27	121	−94	12	Relegation to Liga V Prahova
17	Conpet Ploiești (R)	32	0	2	30	9	106	−97	2 (Note: Conpet Ploiești withdrew from the championship after 19 rounds and lost all the remaining matches with 0–3.)	Relegation to Liga V Prahova
18	Ploiești (R)	0	0	0	0	0	0	0	0 (Note: AS Ploiești withdrew from the championship after 9 rounds and all the results were canceled.)	Expelled

Rules for classification: 1) Points; 2) Head-to-head points; 3) Head-to-head goal difference; 4) Head-to-head goals scored; 5) Head-to-head away goals scored; 6) Goal difference; 7) Goals scored.
(C) Champions; (Q) Qualified for the phase indicated; (R) Relegated

=== Satu Mare County ===
Pos	Team	Pld	W	D	L	GF	GA	GD	Pts	Qualification or relegation
1	Olimpia Satu Mare II (C, Q)	24	19	3	2	94	22	+72	60	Qualification to promotion play-off
2	Luceafărul Decebal	24	17	2	5	70	28	+42	53	
3	Someșul Oar	24	15	4	5	70	38	+32	49	
4	Talna Orașu Nou	24	14	3	7	81	51	+30	45	
5	Recolta Dorolț	23	11	5	7	54	36	+18	38	
6	Știința Beltiug	24	10	3	11	43	47	−4	33	
7	Voința Doba	24	8	6	10	64	67	−3	30	
8	Turul Micula	24	8	4	12	52	63	−11	28	
9	Schwaben Kalmandi Cămin	23	8	3	12	41	67	−26	27	
10	Viitorul Vetiș	24	7	4	13	52	77	−25	25	
11	Sportul Botiz	24	6	4	14	31	75	−44	22	
12	Cetate 2010 Ardud	24	5	2	17	34	77	−43	17	
13	Unirea Tășnad	24	3	5	16	42	80	−38	14	
14	Gloria Moftinu Mare (D)	0	0	0	0	0	0	0	0 (Note: Gloria Moftinu Mare withdrew in the first part of the season and all its results were canceled.)	Withdrew

Rules for classification: 1) Points; 2) Head-to-head points; 3) Head-to-head goal difference; 4) Head-to-head goals scored; 5) Head-to-head away goals scored; 6) Goal difference; 7) Goals scored.
(C) Champions; (D) Disqualified; (Q) Qualified for the phase indicated

=== Sălaj County ===
Pos	Team	Pld	W	D	L	GF	GA	GD	Pts	Qualification or relegation
1	Luceafărul Bălan (C, Q)	26	25	0	1	134	27	+107	75	Qualification to promotion play-off
2	Rapid Jibou	26	16	4	6	83	32	+51	52	
3	Dumbrava Gâlgău Almașului	26	14	7	5	73	38	+35	49	
4	Sportul Șimleu Silvaniei	26	14	4	8	85	58	+27	46	
5	Unirea Mirșid	26	13	7	6	68	44	+24	46	
6	Silvania Cehu Silvaniei	26	14	4	8	74	69	+5	46	
7	Chieșd	26	14	3	9	73	53	+20	45	
8	Benfica Ileanda	26	11	4	11	47	49	−2	37	
9	Crasna	26	8	7	11	57	62	−5	31	
10	Barcău Nușfalău	26	5	9	12	36	56	−20	24	
11	Olimpic Bocșa	26	6	5	15	59	90	−31	23	
12	Real Crișeni	26	7	1	18	47	93	−46	22	
13	Flacăra Halmășd	26	4	3	19	32	84	−52	15	
14	Gloria Bobota	26	1	2	23	29	142	−113	5	

Rules for classification: 1) Points; 2) Head-to-head points; 3) Head-to-head goal difference; 4) Head-to-head goals scored; 5) Head-to-head away goals scored; 6) Goal difference; 7) Goals scored.
(C) Champions; (Q) Qualified for the phase indicated

=== Sibiu County ===
Pos	Team	Pld	W	D	L	GF	GA	GD	Pts	Qualification or relegation
1	Măgura Cisnădie (C, Q)	30	29	0	1	146	22	+124	87	Qualification to promotion play-off
2	Păltiniș Rășinari	30	21	1	8	117	59	+58	64	
3	Voința Sibiu	30	19	3	8	99	52	+47	60	
4	Unirea Miercurea Sibiului	30	18	2	10	97	60	+37	56	
5	Interstar Sibiu	30	17	3	10	71	38	+33	54	
6	Inter Racovița	30	16	5	9	81	49	+32	53	
7	Sparta Mediaș	30	16	4	10	106	76	+30	52	
8	Tălmaciu	30	16	2	12	68	46	+22	50	
9	Agnita	30	15	2	13	70	66	+4	47	
10	Progresul Terezian Sibiu	30	13	3	14	55	81	−26	42	
11	Viitorul Sibiu	30	10	1	19	59	139	−80	31	
12	ASA Sibiu	30	9	2	19	47	84	−37	29	
13	Continental Sibiu	30	9	1	20	44	109	−65	28	
14	Unirea Ocna Sibiului	30	5	4	21	29	81	−52	19	
15	Due FEFE Șeica Mare	30	4	3	23	28	86	−58	15	
16	Universitatea Sibiu	30	4	2	24	17	86	−69	14	

Rules for classification: 1) Points; 2) Head-to-head points; 3) Head-to-head goal difference; 4) Head-to-head goals scored; 5) Head-to-head away goals scored; 6) Goal difference; 7) Goals scored.
(C) Champions; (Q) Qualified for the phase indicated

=== Suceava County ===
Pos	Team	Pld	W	D	L	GF	GA	GD	Pts	Qualification or relegation
1	Bucovina II Ciocănești (C, Q)	33	25	3	5	86	31	+55	78	Qualification to promotion play-off
2	Silva Udești	33	23	5	5	79	33	+46	74	
3	Progresul Frătăuții Vechi	33	22	5	6	79	34	+45	71	
4	Șomuzul Preutești	33	20	3	10	77	40	+37	63	
5	Șomuz Fălticeni	33	20	3	10	84	48	+36	63	
6	Viitorul Liteni	33	18	4	11	80	58	+22	58	
7	Bucovina II Milișăuți	33	17	7	9	79	55	+24	58	
8	Bradul Putna	33	17	4	12	72	49	+23	55	
9	Zimbrul Siret	33	16	4	13	66	50	+16	52	
10	Gura Humorului	33	15	1	17	64	54	+10	46	
11	Știința Vicovu de Sus	33	12	4	17	46	67	−21	40	
12	Avântul Volovăț	33	12	3	18	57	64	−7	39	
13	Recolta Fântânele	33	10	4	19	46	65	−19	34	
14	Moldova Drăgușeni	33	10	2	21	56	83	−27	32	
15	Victoria Vatra Moldoviței	33	9	5	19	46	94	−48	32	
16	Viitorul Verești (R)	33	9	4	20	48	98	−50	31	Relegation to Liga V Suceava
17	Flacăra Vicovu de Jos (R)	33	3	1	29	25	116	−91	10 (Note: Flacăra Vicovu de Jos and Voința Stroiești withdrew from the championship.)	Relegation to Liga V Suceava
18	Voința Stroiești (D)	17	0	0	17	0	51	−51	0	Expelled

Rules for classification: 1) Points; 2) Head-to-head points; 3) Head-to-head goal difference; 4) Head-to-head goals scored; 5) Head-to-head away goals scored; 6) Goal difference; 7) Goals scored.
(C) Champions; (D) Disqualified; (Q) Qualified for the phase indicated; (R) Relegated

=== Teleorman County ===
Pos	Team	Pld	W	D	L	GF	GA	GD	Pts	Qualification or relegation
1	Sporting Turnu Măgurele (C, Q)	22	20	2	0	85	5	+80	62	Qualification to promotion play-off
2	Alexandria	22	17	2	3	63	14	+49	53	
3	Unirea Brânceni	22	13	4	5	42	21	+21	43	
4	Voința Saelele	22	12	2	8	39	27	+12	38	
5	Unirea Țigănești	22	9	5	8	32	26	+6	32	
6	Unirea Petrolul Videle	22	9	4	9	36	38	−2	31	
7	Rapid Buzescu	22	9	3	10	27	37	−10	30	
8	Viață Nouă Olteni	22	7	2	13	26	44	−18	23	
9	Dunărea Zimnicea	22	6	3	13	22	44	−22	21	
10	Astra Plosca	22	5	4	13	20	52	−32	19	
11	Metalul Peretu	22	5	0	17	19	66	−47	15	
12	Spicpo Poroschia	22	3	3	16	24	61	−37	12	
13	Ajax Botoroaga (R)	0	0	0	0	0	0	0	0 (Note: Ajax Botoroaga withdrew from the championship after 13 rounds and all its results were canceled.)	Withdrew
14	Vârtoape (R)	0	0	0	0	0	0	0	0 (Note: Vârtoape withdrew from the championship after 8 rounds and all its results were canceled.)	Withdrew
15	Udinese Uda Clocociov (R)	0	0	0	0	0	0	0	0 (Note: Udinese Uda Clocociov withdrew from the championship after 7 rounds and all its results were canceled.)	Withdrew
16	Inter Gălăteni (R)	0	0	0	0	0	0	0	0 (Note: Inter Gălăteni withdrew from the championship after 3 rounds and all its results were canceled.)	Withdrew

Rules for classification: 1) Points; 2) Head-to-head points; 3) Head-to-head goal difference; 4) Head-to-head goals scored; 5) Head-to-head away goals scored; 6) Goal difference; 7) Goals scored.
(C) Champions; (Q) Qualified for the phase indicated; (R) Relegated

=== Timiș County ===
Pos	Team	Pld	W	D	L	GF	GA	GD	Pts	Qualification or relegation
1	ASU Politehnica Timișoara (C, Q)	34	31	2	1	125	29	+96	95	Qualification to promotion play-off
2	Ripensia Timișoara	34	29	2	3	122	27	+95	89	
3	Ghiroda	34	24	4	6	98	32	+66	76	
4	Voința Mașloc	34	19	8	7	71	33	+38	65	
5	Unirea Sânnicolau Mare	34	21	2	11	78	44	+34	65	
6	Cocoșul Orțișoara	34	19	7	8	63	34	+29	64	
7	Dumbrăvița	34	20	3	11	89	59	+30	63	
8	Timișul Șag	34	16	5	13	67	44	+23	53	
9	Murani	34	15	3	16	74	86	−12	48	
10	Pobeda Dudeștii Vechi	34	13	6	15	63	71	−8	45	
11	Marcel Băban Jimbolia	34	11	7	16	54	52	+2	40	
12	Progresul Racovița	34	13	1	20	77	94	−17	40	
13	Peciu Nou	34	8	6	20	53	76	−23	30	
14	Arsenal Flacăra Făget	34	9	3	22	49	101	−52	30	
15	Progresul Gătaia	34	8	5	21	50	85	−35	29	
16	CFR Timișoara (Note: CFR Timișoara was spared from relegation due to the promotion of ASU Politehnica Timișoara to Liga III.)	34	8	2	24	45	101	−56	26	Spared from relegation
17	Giroc (R)	34	4	4	26	34	149	−115	16	Relegation to Liga V Timiș
18	Auto Timișoara (R)	34	1	4	29	36	131	−95	7	Relegation to Liga V Timiș

Rules for classification: 1) Points; 2) Head-to-head points; 3) Head-to-head goal difference; 4) Head-to-head goals scored; 5) Head-to-head away goals scored; 6) Goal difference; 7) Goals scored.
(C) Champions; (Q) Qualified for the phase indicated; (R) Relegated

=== Tulcea County ===
Pos	Team	Pld	W	D	L	GF	GA	GD	Pts	Qualification or relegation
1	Granitul Babadag (Q)	16	14	2	0	61	15	+46	44	Qualification to championship play-off
2	Pescărușul Sarichioi (Q)	16	10	4	2	39	20	+19	34	Qualification to championship play-off
3	Șoimii Topolog (Q)	16	8	3	5	40	29	+11	27	Qualification to championship play-off
4	Unirea Casimcea (Q)	16	8	2	6	47	24	+23	26	Qualification to championship play-off
5	Noua Generație Măcin	16	7	3	6	35	31	+4	24	
6	Luceafărul Slava Cercheză	16	7	1	8	31	33	−2	22	
7	Triumf Cerna	16	5	0	11	25	42	−17	15	
8	Hamangia Baia	16	3	0	13	22	61	−39	9	
9	Tractorul Horia	16	2	1	13	17	62	−45	7	

Rules for classification: 1) Points; 2) Head-to-head points; 3) Head-to-head goal difference; 4) Head-to-head goals scored; 5) Head-to-head away goals scored; 6) Goal difference; 7) Goals scored.
(Q) Qualified for the phase indicated

==== Championship play-off ====
Pos	Team	Pld	W	D	L	GF	GA	GD	Pts	Qualification
1	Granitul Babadag (C, Q)	6	5	1	0	19	5	+14	16	Qualification for promotion play-off
2	Pescărușul Sarichioi	6	4	1	1	14	7	+7	13	
3	Unirea Casimcea	6	2	0	4	13	17	−4	6	
4	Șoimii Topolog	6	0	0	6	5	22	−17	0	

Rules for classification: 1) Points; 2) Head-to-head points; 3) Head-to-head goal difference; 4) Head-to-head goals scored; 5) Head-to-head away goals scored; 6) Goal difference; 7) Goals scored.
(C) Champions; (Q) Qualified for the phase indicated

=== Vaslui County ===
==== North series ====
Pos	Team	Pld	W	D	L	GF	GA	GD	Pts	Qualification or relegation
1	Atletico Vaslui (Q)	24	22	1	1	163	8	+155	67	Qualification to championship play-off
2	Gârceni (Q)	24	20	1	3	100	31	+69	61	Qualification to championship play-off
3	SMART Negrești	24	19	2	3	135	22	+113	59	
4	Vaslui	23	16	2	5	83	42	+41	50	
5	Viitorul Rebricea	23	12	3	8	77	63	+14	39	
6	Victoria Muntenii de Jos	22	10	2	10	45	49	−4	32	
7	Viitorul Văleni	24	9	2	13	52	81	−29	29	
8	Vointa Ștefan cel Mare	21	8	1	12	48	91	−43	25	
9	Lipovăț	22	5	4	13	31	73	−42	19	
10	Vulturul Bălteni	21	5	3	13	32	64	−32	18	
11	Dinamic Boțesti	23	4	3	16	33	90	−57	15	
12	Inter Sport Vaslui	23	3	1	19	36	128	−92	10	
13	Avântul Zăpodeni	22	2	1	19	43	141	−98	7	

Rules for classification: 1) Points; 2) Head-to-head points; 3) Head-to-head goal difference; 4) Head-to-head goals scored; 5) Head-to-head away goals scored; 6) Goal difference; 7) Goals scored.
(Q) Qualified for the phase indicated

==== South series ====
Pos	Team	Pld	W	D	L	GF	GA	GD	Pts	Qualification or relegation
1	Pajura Huși (Q)	20	16	1	3	92	22	+70	49	Qualification to championship play-off
2	Juventus Fălciu (Q)	18	15	2	1	124	17	+107	47	Qualification to championship play-off
3	Vitis Șuletea	19	11	3	5	62	30	+32	36	
4	Viitorul Bârlad	19	10	0	9	34	32	+2	30	
5	Multim Perieni	19	9	2	8	42	51	−9	29	
6	Olimpia Stănilești	18	9	1	8	36	42	−6	28	
7	Flacăra Murgeni	18	8	2	8	41	45	−4	26	
8	Unirea Banca	20	7	3	10	48	77	−29	24	
9	Foresta Zorleni	20	6	1	13	30	51	−21	19	
10	LPS Vaslui	20	5	2	13	34	109	−75	17	
11	Podgoria Oltenești	19	0	1	18	8	75	−67	1	
12	FDR Tutova (D)	0	0	0	0	0	0	0	0 (Note: FDR Tutova withdrew in the first part of the season and all its results were canceled.)	Withdrew

Rules for classification: 1) Points; 2) Head-to-head points; 3) Head-to-head goal difference; 4) Head-to-head goals scored; 5) Head-to-head away goals scored; 6) Goal difference; 7) Goals scored.
(D) Disqualified; (Q) Qualified for the phase indicated

==== Championship play-off ====
Pos	Team	Pld	W	D	L	GF	GA	GD	Pts	Qualification	ATV	GÂR	JFĂ	PAJ
1	Atletico Vaslui (C, Q)	6	5	0	1	26	3	+23	15	Qualification to promotion play-off	—	0–1	12–0	2–0
2	Gârceni	6	5	0	1	16	8	+8	15		0–2	—	3–0	2–1
3	Juventus Fălciu	6	2	0	4	15	33	−18	6		2–7	4–7	—	4–1
4	Pajura Huși	6	0	0	6	6	19	−13	0		0–3	1–3	3–5	—

Rules for classification: 1) Points; 2) Head-to-head points; 3) Head-to-head goal difference; 4) Head-to-head goals scored; 5) Head-to-head away goals scored; 6) Goal difference; 7) Goals scored.
(C) Champions; (Q) Qualified for the phase indicated

=== Vâlcea County ===
==== North Series ====
Pos	Team	Pld	W	D	L	GF	GA	GD	Pts	Qualification or relegation
1	Flacăra Horezu (Q)	28	28	0	0	133	11	+122	84	Qualification to championship play-off
2	Stejarul Vlădești (Q)	28	19	4	5	82	48	+34	61	Qualification to championship play-off
3	Viitorul Dăești	28	19	3	6	83	53	+30	60	
4	Cozia Călimănești	28	17	5	6	80	41	+39	56	
5	Râmnicu Vâlcea II	28	17	4	7	71	36	+35	55	
6	Minerul Ocnele Mari	28	16	4	8	84	51	+33	52	
7	Mihăești	28	14	6	8	73	55	+18	48	
8	Posada Perișani	28	9	9	10	57	56	+1	36	
9	Topologul Galicea	28	9	8	11	47	53	−6	35	
10	Chimia 2012 Râmnicu Vâlcea	28	7	5	16	48	88	−40	26	
11	Foresta Malaia	28	7	3	18	52	92	−40	24	
12	Hidroelectra Râmnicu Vâlcea	28	6	5	17	50	76	−26	23	
13	Viitorul Budești	28	4	5	19	35	97	−62	17	
14	Pietrari	28	3	2	23	40	116	−76	11	
15	Lotru Brezoi	28	3	1	24	23	84	−61	10	

Rules for classification: 1) Points; 2) Head-to-head points; 3) Head-to-head goal difference; 4) Head-to-head goals scored; 5) Head-to-head away goals scored; 6) Goal difference; 7) Goals scored.
(Q) Qualified for the phase indicated

==== South Series ====
Pos	Team	Pld	W	D	L	GF	GA	GD	Pts	Qualification or relegation
1	Șirineasa (Q)	26	23	2	1	148	19	+129	71	Qualification to championship play-off
2	Băbeni (Q)	26	20	3	3	99	36	+63	63	Qualification to championship play-off
3	Mădulari	26	17	5	4	89	25	+64	56	
4	Unirea Tomșani	26	16	3	7	90	50	+40	51	
5	Viitorul Valea Mare	26	14	5	7	71	43	+28	47	
6	Cavalerul Trac Cernișoara	26	13	5	8	74	43	+31	44	
7	Unirea Drăgășani	26	14	2	10	51	41	+10	44	
8	Minerul Costești	26	13	2	11	52	48	+4	41	
9	Experți Popești	26	12	4	10	60	51	+9	40	
10	Orlești	26	8	5	13	66	62	+4	29	
11	Crețeni	26	5	2	19	29	72	−43	17	
12	Victoria Frâncești	26	4	0	22	31	131	−100	12	
13	Zorile Scundu	26	4	0	22	19	122	−103	12 (Note: Zorile Scundu withdrew after 20 rounds and lost all the remaining matches with 0–3.)	
14	Oltul Ionești	26	0	0	26	10	139	−129	0 (Note: Oltul Ionești withdrew after 15 rounds and lost all the remaining matches with 0–3.)	

Rules for classification: 1) Points; 2) Head-to-head points; 3) Head-to-head goal difference; 4) Head-to-head goals scored; 5) Head-to-head away goals scored; 6) Goal difference; 7) Goals scored.
(Q) Qualified for the phase indicated

==== Championship play-off ====
===== Semi-finals =====
Team 1	Agg.	Team 2	1st leg	2nd leg
Stejarul Vlădești	1–9	Șirineasa	0–3	1–6
Băbeni	3–7	Flacăra Horezu	2–4	1–3

===== Final =====
Team 1	Score	Team 2
Flacăra Horezu	3–2	Șirineasa

Flacăra Horezu won the 2014–15 Liga IV Vâlcea County and qualify to promotion play-off in Liga III.

=== Vrancea County ===
Pos	Team	Pld	W	D	L	GF	GA	GD	Pts	Qualification or relegation
1	Panciu (Q)	18	15	2	1	70	16	+54	47	Qualification to championship play-off
2	Euromania Dumbrăveni (Q)	18	13	2	3	79	21	+58	41	Qualification to championship play-off
3	Suraia (Q)	18	12	2	4	48	21	+27	38	Qualification to championship play-off
4	Voința Odobești (Q)	18	10	5	3	50	28	+22	35	Qualification to championship play-off
5	Adjud	18	6	3	9	42	41	+1	21	
6	Selena Jariștea	18	6	2	10	27	48	−21	20	
7	Voința Cârligele	18	6	1	11	44	52	−8	19	
8	Victoria Gugești	18	5	2	11	31	49	−18	17	
9	Unirea Țifești	18	4	2	12	32	60	−28	14	
10	Câmpineanca	18	2	1	15	16	103	−87	7	

Rules for classification: 1) Points; 2) Head-to-head points; 3) Head-to-head goal difference; 4) Head-to-head goals scored; 5) Head-to-head away goals scored; 6) Goal difference; 7) Goals scored.
(Q) Qualified for the phase indicated

Championship play-off

Pos	Team	Pld	W	D	L	GF	GA	GD	Pts	Qualification
1	Panciu (C, Q)	6	5	1	0	12	2	+10	16	Qualification for promotion play-off
2	Euromania Dumbrăveni	6	3	2	1	12	9	+3	11	
3	Voința Odobești	6	2	0	4	12	14	−2	6	
4	Suraia	6	0	1	5	4	15	−11	1	

Rules for classification: 1) Points; 2) Head-to-head points; 3) Head-to-head goal difference; 4) Head-to-head goals scored; 5) Head-to-head away goals scored; 6) Goal difference; 7) Goals scored.
(C) Champions; (Q) Qualified for the phase indicated

== See also ==
- 2014–15 Liga I
- 2014–15 Liga II
- 2014–15 Liga III
