= FC Voluntari II =

Romanian football club

Voluntari II
- Full name: Fotbal Club Voluntari II
- Nicknames: Voluntărenii (The People from Voluntari)
- Short name: Voluntari II
- Founded: 2014
- Dissolved: 2024
- Ground: Gheorghe Dincă
- Capacity: 1,500 (700 seated)
- 2023–24: Liga III, Seria III, 10th (relegated)
- Website: https://www.fcvoluntari.com/
| Home colours | Away colours |

Fotbal Club Voluntari II, commonly known as FC Voluntari II, or simply as Voluntari II, was the reserve squad of Romanian first league side, FC Voluntari. The squad last played in the Liga III, after achieving the promotion at the end of the 2014–15 season.

== History ==
The team was founded in the summer of 2014 from the desire of having a second senior squad where the players who finished the youth academy could be accommodated with the level of seniors, in the idea of being subsequently promoted to the first squad. The team competed in Liga IV Ilfov County, winning the title after just one season and qualifying for the promotion play-off to Liga III, where it defeated Arsenal Malu, the Liga IV Giurgiu County champions, by 6–1 at home and 3–0 away.

After promotion, Octavian Chihaia was appointed as head coach and was replaced in March 2016 by Dinu Todoran, who led the team to a 3rd-place finish in Series III in the 2015–16 season, narrowly missing out on promotion by just one point behind Afumați and Pitești. The club was subsequently managed by former notable players such as Dinu Todoran, Cosmin Bărcăuan and Tiberiu Bălan. Under their guidance, the team recorded the following results: 4th place in 2016–17, 7th place in 2017–18, and 10th place in 2018–19.

== Ground ==
FC Voluntari II played its home matches on Gheorghe Dincă Stadium, in Voluntari, with a capacity of 1,500 (700 on seats).

== Honours ==
Liga IV – Ilfov County

- Winners (1): 2014–15

== League and cup history ==
| Season | Tier | Division | Place | Cupa României |
|---|---|---|---|---|
| 2023–24 | 3 | Liga III (Seria III) | 10th (R) | |
| 2022–23 | 3 | Liga III (Seria III) | 7th | |
| 2021–22 | 3 | Liga III (Seria III) | 6th | |
| 2020–21 | 3 | Liga III (Seria IV) | 6th | |
| 2019–20 | 3 | Liga III (Seria III) | 10th | |
| 2018–19 | 3 | Liga III (Seria III) | 10th | |
| 2017–18 | 3 | Liga III (Seria II) | 7th | |
| 2016–17 | 3 | Liga III (Seria III) | 4th | |
| 2015–16 | 3 | Liga III (Seria III) | 3rd | |
| 2014–15 | 4 | Liga IV (IF) | 1st (C, P) | |

== Notable former players ==
The footballers enlisted below have had international cap(s) for their respective countries at junior and/or senior level and/or played in a fully professional league.

- (Romania) Cristian Costin
- (Romania) Robert Gherghe
- (Romania) Sorin Ispir
- (Romania) Bogdan Mitache
- (Romania) Răzvan Petrariu
- (Romania) Raphael Stănescu
- (Romania) Vlad Tudorache
- (Romania) Marius Tudorică
- (Romania) Adrian Voicu

== Former managers ==
- (Romania) Octavian Chihaia (2015)
- (Romania) Dinu Todoran (2016–2018)
- (Romania) Cosmin Bărcăuan (2018)
- (Romania) Tiberiu Bălan (2018)
- (Romania) Dinu Todoran (2020)
- (Romania) Dinu Todoran (2021–2024)
