= Octavian Chihaia =

Romanian footballer

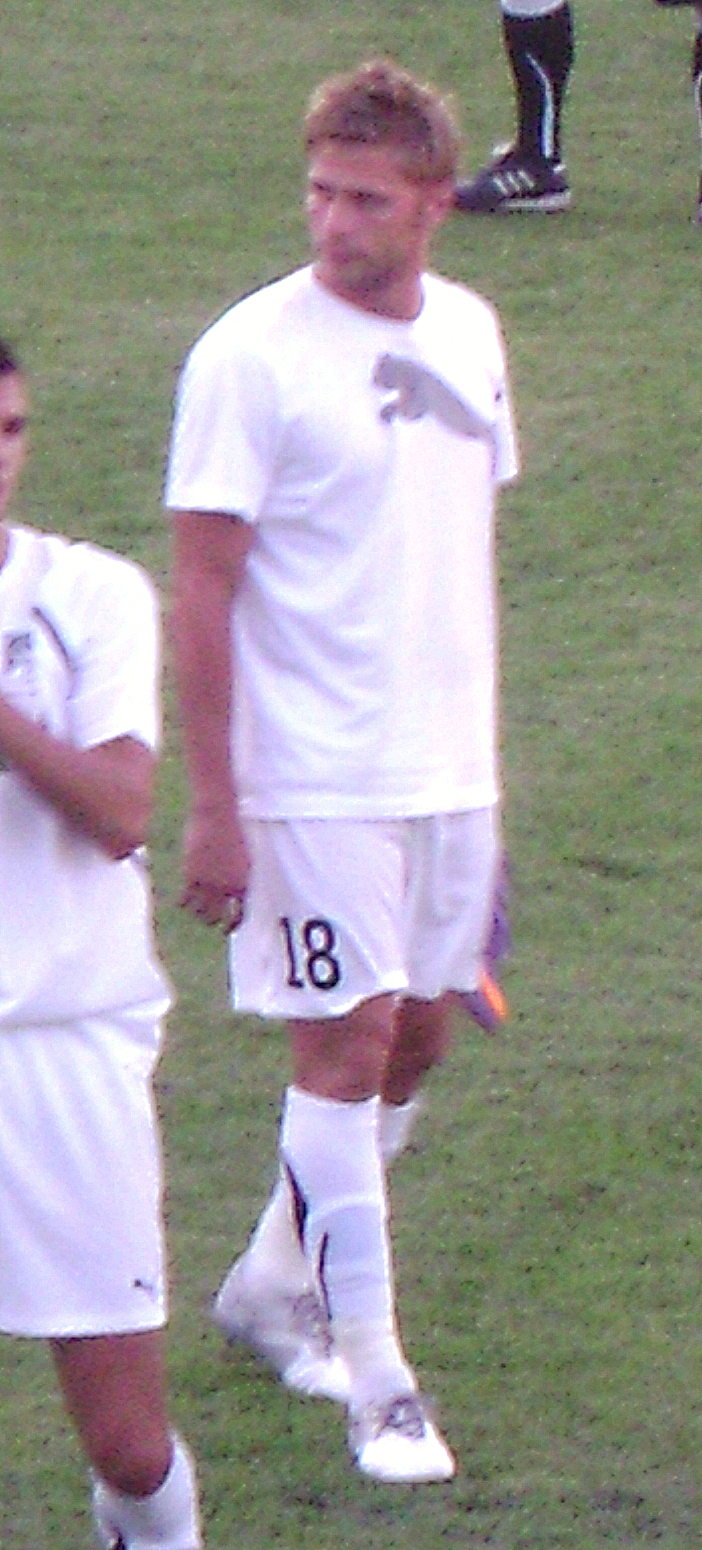

Personal information
- Date of birth: 18 March 1981 (age 45)
- Place of birth: Bucharest, Romania
- Height: 1.82 m (6 ft 0 in)
- Position: Striker

Team information
- Current team: Rapid București U17 (head coach)

Youth career
- –1998: Sportul Studenţesc

Senior career*
Years	Team	Apps	(Gls)
1998–2003	Sportul Studenţesc	109	(16)
2003–2005	Naţional București	48	(7)
2005	Dinamo București	3	(0)
2006	→ Naţional București (loan)	12	(1)
2006–2007	CFR Cluj	8	(2)
2007	→ Naţional București (loan)	11	(2)
2008	Dacia Mioveni	11	(0)
2008–2009	Otopeni	4	(0)
2009	Tianjin Teda	0	(0)
2010–2011	Sportul Studenţesc	15	(0)
Total		221	(28)

International career
2001–2003	Romania U21	9	(2)

Managerial career
- 2015–2019: Voluntari U19
- 2016: Voluntari II
- 2019–2020: Astra Giurgiu (assistant)
- 2020–2021: Voluntari (assistant)
- 2021–2024: Rapid București U19
- 2024–: Rapid București U17
- 2025: Rapid București (caretaker)
- * Club domestic league appearances and goals

Octavian Chihaia (born 18 March 1981) is a former Romanian professional footballer who played as a striker, who is currently in charge at Rapid București U17.

== Career ==
Chihaia debuted at Sportul Studenţesc. He later moved to Naţional București and Dinamo București. During the summer of 2006 he was traded to CFR Cluj for the price of 300,000 euros. He also played 2 matches for Dinamo București in the 2005–06 UEFA Cup. He transferred to CS Otopeni in the summer break of 2008.

== Personal life ==
He is the son of former football International, Romulus Chihaia.

== Honours ==
Sportul Studențesc

- Divizia B: 2000–01

Dinamo București

- Supercupa României: 2005
