= Dinu Ghezzo =

Dr. Gezzo at the piano

Dinu Ghezzo (July 2 1940 - December 9, 2011) was a Romanian conductor who was director of the Composition Studies at New York University.
