= Dinu Grigoresco =

French painter (1914–2001)

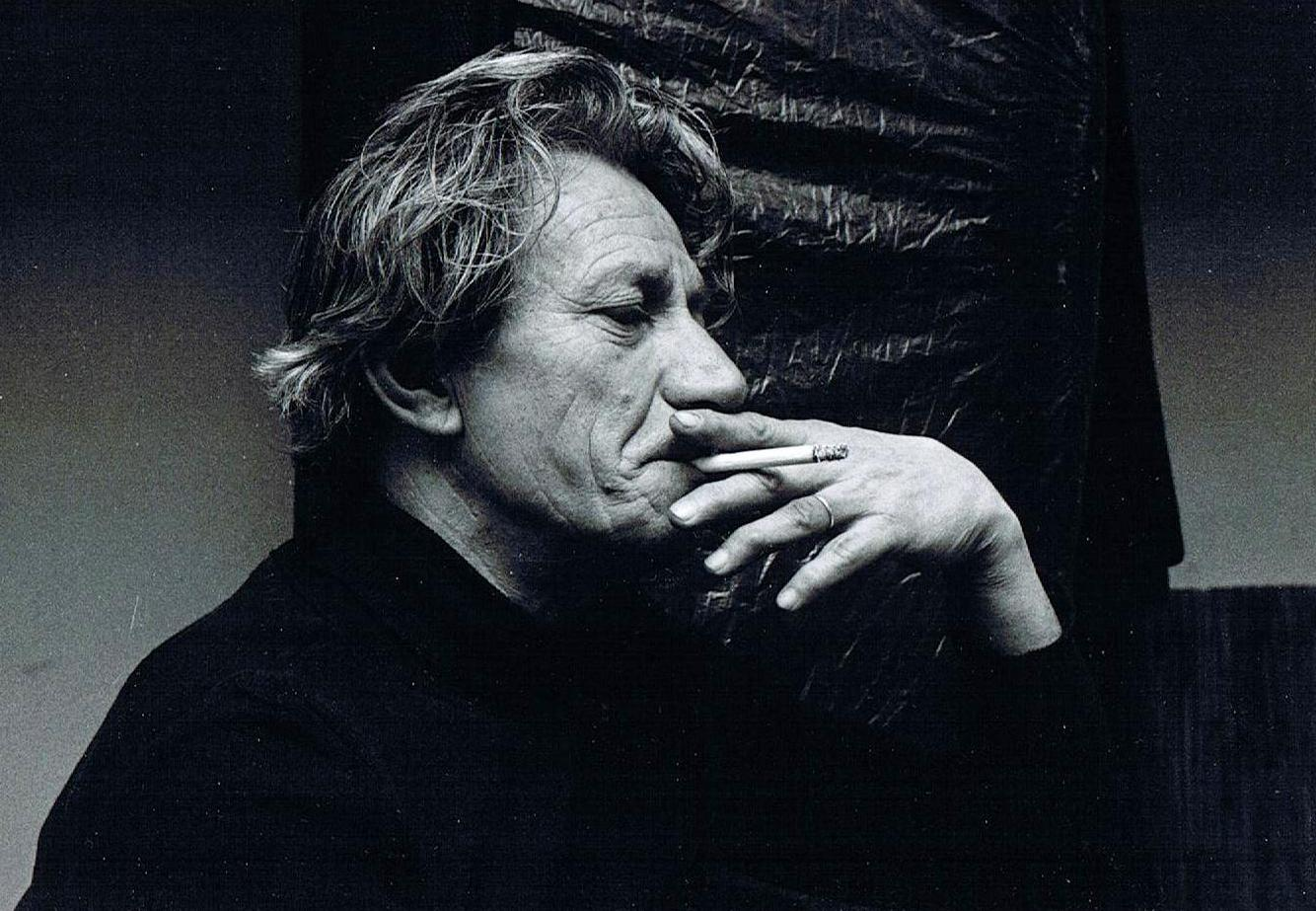
Dinu Grigoresco, Nantes, 1979

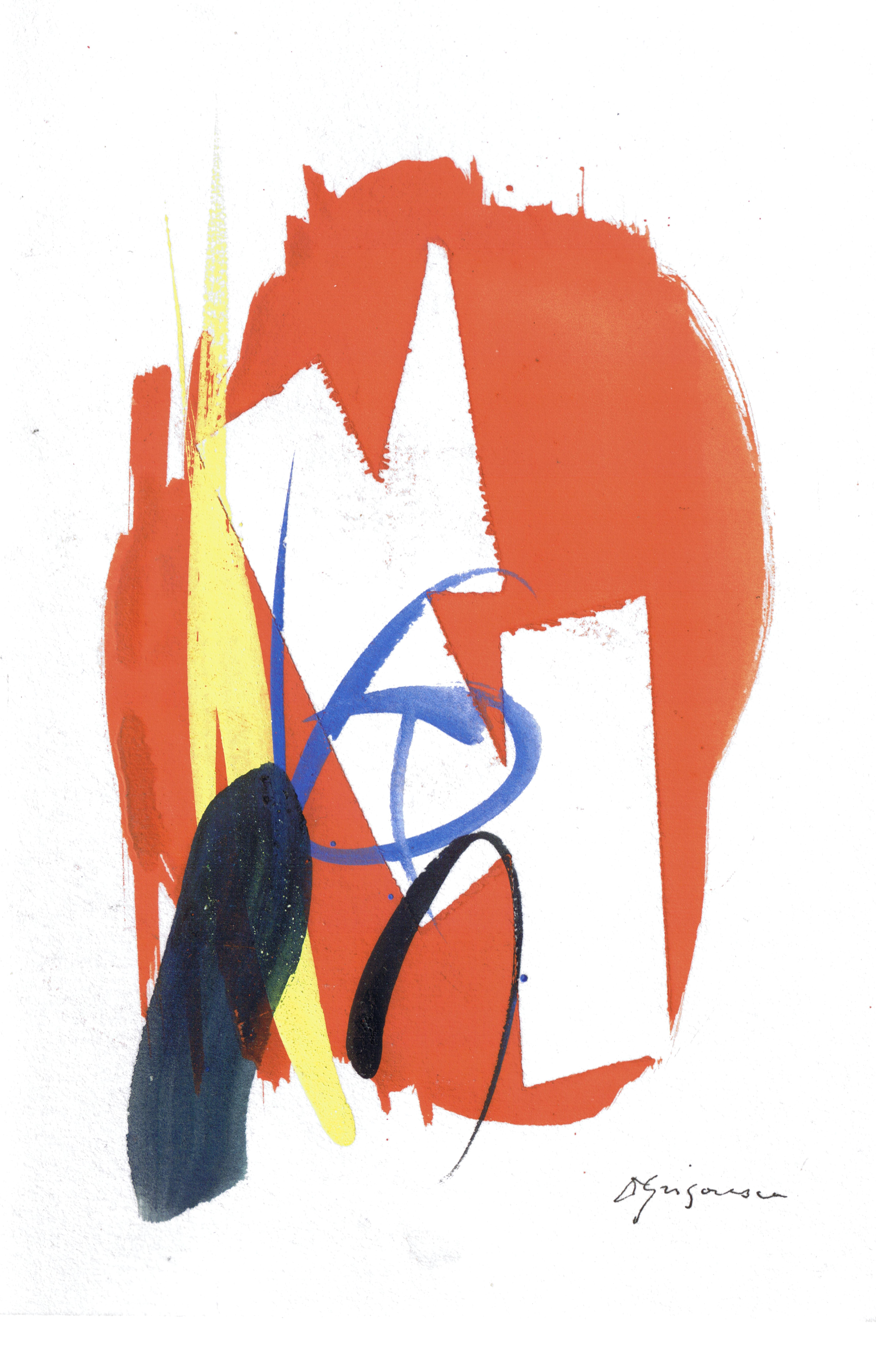
Dinu Grigoresco, Abstract composition, 1983

Dinu-Alexandre Grigoresco (1 November 1914, Bucharest, Romania – 11 October 2001, Fontenay-aux-Roses, France) was a Romanian-born French painter.

== Biography ==
Dinu Grigoresco was the grandson of Nicolae Grigorescu, one of the leading Romanian painters of the nineteenth century. He studied at the Fine Arts Academy of Bucharest before leaving for Paris in 1939, where he won a scholarship to the National School of Fine Arts. He would spend the rest of his life in France. He initially studied under Léon Sabatier and Nicolas Untersteller, though it was the two years that he spent in André Lhote's studio that most influenced his work. A member of the lyrical abstraction group, he moved in the artistic and literary circles of postwar Paris, befriending, among others, Francis Gruber, Jean Dewasne, and Constantin Brâncuși.

In 1956, he exhibited for the first time at the Salon des Surindépendants in Paris. Beginning in 1957, he also contributed regularly to the Salon des Réalités Nouvelles. France's Ministry of Culture purchased the painting that he exhibited at the 1974 edition of that salon for the Musée d’Art Moderne de la ville de Paris. Grigoresco participated in group exhibitions in Munich (1960) and Luxembourg (1972) and his work was featured in solo exhibitions at the Galerie du Haut-Pavé in Paris (1957), as well as in Nantes (1975, 1982, and 1986) and in Montreal (1989).

Under the influence of André Lhote, his paintings were initially marked by cubism, though they gradually evolved towards lyrical abstraction. His work falls into two distinct periods. In the first period, black predominates and the artist shunned galleries and the commercialisation of his work. The death of his spouse marked a moment of deep rupture in his art, however. Grigoresco abandoned painting for several years and destroyed part of his inventory of artwork. In the early 1970s, the artist resumed his work. Upward circular movements continue to predominate in this second artistic phase, but the pictorial synthesis is brighter.
