= Dinu Todoran =

Romanian footballer

Personal information
- Full name: Dinu Marius Todoran
- Date of birth: 8 September 1978 (age 48)
- Place of birth: Brașov, Romania
- Height: 1.80 m (5 ft 11 in)
- Position: Central midfielder

Youth career
- 1989–1996: ICIM Brașov

Senior career*
Years	Team	Apps	(Gls)
1996–2002	Petrolul Ploiești	105	(18)
2002–2003	Astra Ploiești	25	(4)
2003–2004	Petrolul Ploiești	24	(3)
2004–2008	Farul Constanța	96	(12)
2008–2010	Unirea Urziceni	50	(6)
2011	Victoria Brănești	21	(0)
2012	Botoșani	24	(2)
2013–2015	Voluntari	40	(2)
Total		389	(47)

Managerial career
- 2016: Voluntari (assistant)
- 2017: Voluntari (caretaker)
- 2017–2018: Voluntari II
- 2018: Voluntari
- 2020: Voluntari II
- 2020: Romania U19 (assistant)
- 2020–2021: CSM Slatina
- 2021: FCSB
- 2021–2024: Voluntari II
- 2024: Petrolul II Ploiești
- 2024–2025: CSM Codlea
- 2025: Măgura Codlea
- 2025–2026: Tunari
- * Club domestic league appearances and goals

Dinu Marius Todoran (born 8 September 1978) is a Romanian professional football manager and former footballer.

== Honours ==
=== Player ===
Farul Constanța

- Cupa României runner-up: 2004–05

Unirea Urziceni

- Liga I: 2008–09
- Supercupa României runner-up: 2009, 2010

Botoșani

- Liga II: 2012–13

Voluntari

- Liga II: 2014–15
- Liga III: 2013–14
