= Florin Costin Șoavă =

Romanian footballer and manager

Florin Şoavă
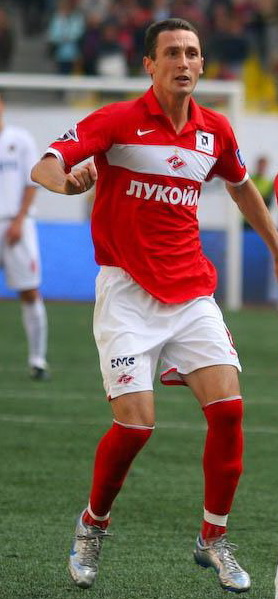

Personal information
- Full name: Florin Costin Şoavă
- Date of birth: 24 July 1978 (age 48)
- Place of birth: Gârla Mare, Romania
- Height: 1.88 m (6 ft 2 in)
- Positions: Defender; defensive midfielder

Youth career
- –1996: CSȘ Turnu-Severin

Senior career*
Years	Team	Apps	(Gls)
1996–1999	Extensiv Craiova	104	(14)
2000–2001	Universitatea Craiova	36	(0)
2001–2003	Rapid București	63	(2)
2004–2008	Spartak Moscow	52	(1)
2005–2006	→ Krylia Sovetov (loan)	26	(2)
2008	Khimki	14	(1)
2009	Universitatea Craiova	29	(0)
2010–2012	Arsenal Kyiv	38	(2)
2012	Apă Craiova	3	(0)
2013	Sporting Roşiori	10	(5)
Total		375	(27)

International career
2002	Romania U21	1	(0)
2000–2006	Romania	23	(0)

Managerial career
- 2012: Apă Craiova (player/coach)
- 2013: Sporting Roşiori (player/coach)
- 2014–2015: CFR Romgaz Craiova (youth)
- 2016: Dunărea Bistreț
- 2016: CS Podari
- 2016–2017: Filiași
- 2017–2018: Universitatea Craiova U19
- 2018: Sporting Roșiori
- 2025–2026: CS Drobeta-Turnu Severin
- * Club domestic league appearances and goals

Florin Costin Şoavă (born 24 July 1978) is a Romanian professional football manager and former player, who played as a defender or a defensive midfielder.

== Career statistics ==
Appearances and goals by national team and year
National team	Year	Apps	Goals
Romania	2000	2	0
Romania	2001	0	0
Romania	2002	5	0
Romania	2003	7	0
Romania	2004	7	0
Romania	2005	0	0
Romania	2006	2	0
Total		22	0

== Honours ==
=== Player ===
Extensiv Craiova

- Divizia B: 1998–99

Universitatea Craiova

- Cupa României runner-up: 1999–2000

Rapid București

- Divizia A: 2002–03
- Cupa României: 2001–02
- Supercupa României: 2002, 2003

Sporting Roșiori

- Liga IV – Teleorman County: 2012–13

=== Coach ===
Sporting Roșiori

- Liga IV – Teleorman County: 2012–13

CS Drobeta Turnu-Severin

- Liga IV – Mehedinți County: 2025–26
