= CS Sporting Roșiori =

Romanian football club

Sporting Roșiori
- Full name: Clubul Sportiv Sporting Roșiori
- Short name: Sporting
- Founded: 2008; 18 years ago
- Dissolved: 2025
- Ground: Municipal
- Capacity: 5,000
- 2024–25: Liga III, Seria IV, 10th (relegated)
Home colours	Away colours

Clubul Sportiv Sporting Roșiori, commonly known as Sporting Roșiori, was a Romanian professional football club based in Roșiorii de Vede, Teleorman County. Sporting Roșiori was founded initially in 1929 and existed until 1972, when it was absorbed by CFR Roșiori, later renamed ROVA Roșiori, which was dissolved in 2008, after which the Sporting Roșiori name was revived, without direct continuity with the original entities.

== History ==
=== First Sporting (1929–1972) ===
Sporting Roșiori was originally founded in 1929 and competed mainly in county and regional championships, becoming one of the first football teams to represent the city of Roșiorii de Vede. The club participated in the 1946–47 season of the first edition of Divizia C after the end of World War II, marking its first appearance in the national league system and finishing 2nd in Series II.

In the following years, Sporting became a regular participant in the Bucharest Regional Championship, with fluctuating results, and later took part in the newly established Teleorman County Championship following the administrative reorganization of Romanian football in 1968. In the 1970–71 season, Sporting Roșiori won the North Group of the county championship and secured promotion to Divizia C after defeating Cetatea Turnu Măgurele, the South Group winners, in the championship final.

In the 1971–72 season, Sporting Roșiori competed in Divizia C, finishing 12th in Series VI. In 1972, the club was absorbed into CFR Roșiori, which later became ROVA Roșiori, emerging as the main football club of the town.

=== Second Sporting (2008–2025) ===
Following the dissolution of ROVA Roșiori in 2008, a new club under the name Sporting Roșiori was founded to continue the football tradition in the town. In their first season, the team took the place of Real Beuca in the 2008–09 season of the Liga IV Teleorman County, finishing in 3rd place.

In the 2009–10 season, Alexandru Gheorghe served as player-coach but was dismissed after the 25th round and replaced by the youth team coach, Eugen Crăciunescu, for the remaining matches, with the team ending the season in 4th place. The 2010–11 campaign began under Constantin Berechet, who was replaced during the season by Dumitru Paciurea. Paciurea remained in charge throughout the 2011–12 season.

In the 2012–13 season, Laurențiu Lăcoviște acted as player-coach until the winter break, when Florin Șoavă took over and led the team to the Liga IV Teleorman County championship title and qualification for the promotion play-off to Liga III. Sporting Roșiori narrowly missed promotion after a 0–1 defeat against FC Balș, the Olt County winners, in the decisive match played at the Ștrand Stadium in Pitești.

In the 2013–14 season, Florin Șoavă left the team after eight rounds, with the squad being led until the end of the first half of the campaign by assistant coach Iulian Petre. During the winter break, Cristian Negru was appointed as the new head coach. Under his guidance, Sporting Roșiori secured their second consecutive county title and went on to win the promotion play-off, 1–0 against Comprest GIM București, the Bucharest Municipal winners, thus achieving promotion to Liga III.

In 2025, Sporting Roșiori was dissolved due to financial problems, after seventeen years of activity in Romanian football.

== Honours ==
=== Leagues ===
Liga IV – Teleorman County

- Winners (3): 1970–71, 2012–13, 2013–14

=== Cups ===
Cupa României – Teleorman County

- Winners (1): 2012–13

== Former managers ==
- (Romania) Alexandru Gheorghe (2009–2010)
- (Romania) Eugen Crăciunescu (2010)
- (Romania) Constantin Berechet (2010)
- (Romania) Dumitru Paciurea (2011–2012)
- (Romania) Laurențiu Lăcoviște (2012)
- (Romania) Florin Șoavă (2013)
- (Romania) Iulian Petre (2013)
- (Romania) Cristian Negru (2014–2017)
- (Romania) Alexandru Gheorghe (2018)
- (Romania) Florin Șoavă (2018)
- (Romania) Ion Ion (2019)
- (Romania) Romulus Ciobanu (2019–2021)
