= Stadionul Municipal (Roșiorii de Vede) =

Multi-purpose stadium in Romania

- Stadionul Rova
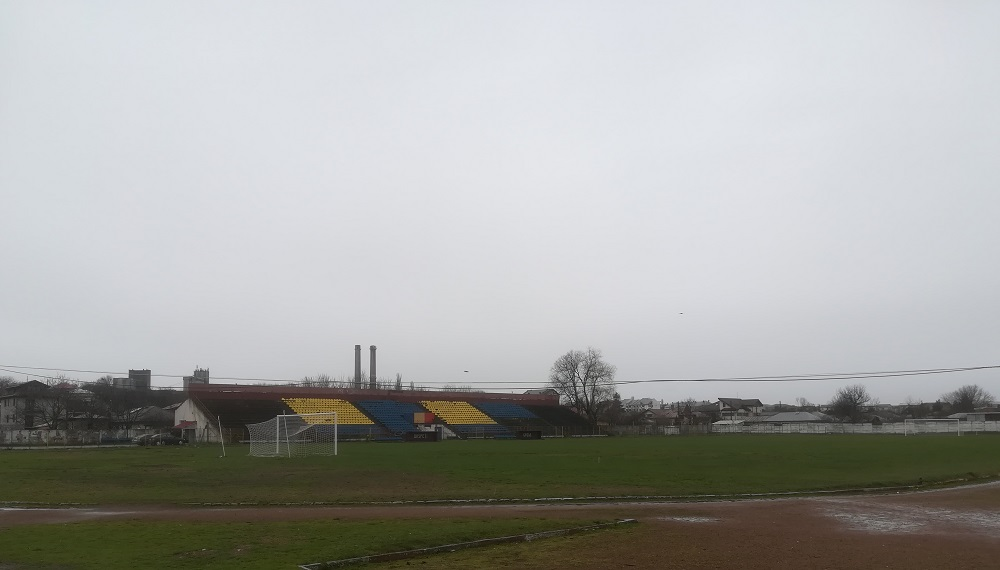
- Interactive map of Stadionul Municipal
- Address: Str. Republicii
- Location: Roșiorii de Vede, Romania
- Coordinates: 44°06′41.5″N 24°59′07.2″E
- Owner: Municipality of Roșiorii de Vede
- Operator: Sporting Roșiori
- Capacity: 5,000 (2,000 seated)
- Surface: Grass

Construction
- Opened: 1921
- Renovated: 1973
- Expanded: 1973

Tenants
- CFR Roșiori; Rova Roșiori; Juventus Roșiori; Sporting Roșiori (2008–present)

Stadionul Municipal is a multi-purpose stadium in Roșiorii de Vede, Romania. It is currently used mostly for football matches, is the home ground of Sporting Roșiori and has a capacity of 5,000 people (2,000 on seats). In the past, the stadium was the home ground of other local teams such as CFR Roșiori, Rova Roșiori or Juventus Roșiori.
