= Vrata, Mehedinți =

Vrata
- Commune
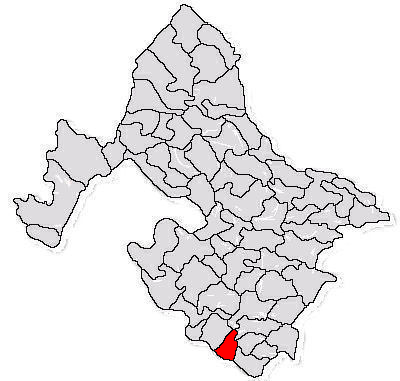
- Location in Mehedinți County

- Location in Romania
- Coordinates: 44°12′N 22°51′E
- Country: Romania
- County: Mehedinți
- Area: 48.33 km^{2} (18.66 sq mi)
- Population (2021-12-01): 1,977
  - Density: 41/km^{2} (110/sq mi)
- Time zone: EET/EEST (UTC+2/+3)
- Vehicle reg.: MH

Vrata is a commune located in Mehedinți County, Oltenia, Romania. It is composed of a single village, Vrata. This was part of Gârla Mare Commune until 2004, when it was split off.
