= Gârla Mare =

- Commune
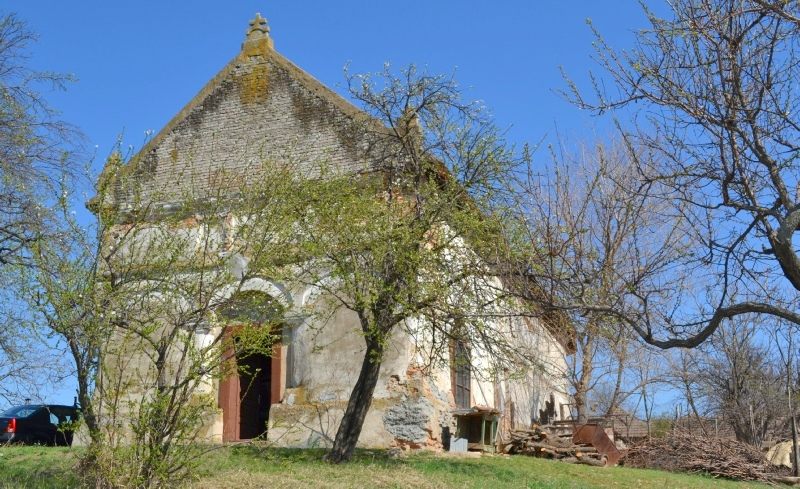
- Descent of the Holy Spirit Church in Gârla Mare

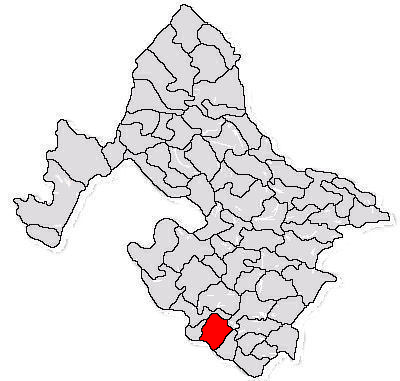
- Location in Mehedinți County

- Location in Romania
- Coordinates: 44°13′N 22°46′E
- Country: Romania
- County: Mehedinți

Government
  - Mayor (2020–2024): Dumitru Baicu (PSD)
- Area: 62.56 km^{2} (24.15 sq mi)
- Elevation: 61 m (200 ft)
- Population (2021-12-01): 3,300
  - Density: 53/km^{2} (140/sq mi)
- Time zone: UTC+02:00 (EET)
  - Summer (DST): UTC+03:00 (EEST)
- Postal code: 227210
- Vehicle reg.: MH

Gârla Mare is a commune located in Mehedinți County, Oltenia, Romania. It is composed of a single village, Gârla Mare. It also included the village of Vrata until 2004, when it was split off to form Vrata Commune.

== Geography ==
- Climate: Located in the southwest of Romania, it features a temperate-continental climate with Mediterranean influences.
- Relief: Specific to the Dolj and Mehedinți County, the commune's relief consists mainly of plains.

== Economy ==
During the Communist era, this commune was an important cultural and economic centre. It was directly connected to the Danube trade routes through its port. Efficient use of the relief and local resources allowed for the development of farms and crops that would then be redistributed among neighboring towns. After the fall of communism in 1989, a great deal of resources have been lost as a consequence of poor maintenance and depreciation.

== Natives ==
- Florin Costin Șoavă (born 1978), footballer
