= 2012–13 Liga IV =

Liga IV
- Season: 2012–13
- Country: Romania

The 2012–13 Liga IV was the 71st season of the Liga IV, the fourth tier of the Romanian football league system. The champions of each county association play against one from a neighboring county in a play-off match played on a neutral venue. The winners of the play-off matches promoted to Liga III.

== Promotion play-off ==
The matches was scheduled to be played on 19 June 2013.

Team 1	Score	Team 2
Pojorâta (SV)	2–1 (a.e.t.)	(IS) Viitorul Târgu Frumos
Mureșul Luduș (MS)	3–2 (a.e.t.)	(HR) Miercurea Ciuc
Baia Mare (MM)	5–0	(BN) Heniu Prundu Bârgăului
Someșul Cărășeu (SM)	0–1	(CJ) Unirea Jucu
Ineu (AR)	1–0	(BH) Kinder Junior Paleu
Rapid Jibou (SJ)	0–4	(AB) Cugir
NMM Becicherecu Mic (TM)	3–0	(CS) Metalul Oțelu Roșu
Hidro Râmnicu Vâlcea (VL)	1–3	(SB) Avrig
Știința Turceni (GJ)	2–0	(HD) Universitatea Petroșani
Păpăuți (CV)	7–1	(BV) Râșnov
Național Golești (VN)	1–2	(BC) Negri
CSM Câmpina (PH)	6–0	(BZ) Voința Lanuri
Cetatea Târgu Neamț (NT)	2–1	(BT) Luceafărul Mihai Eminescu
Gârceni (VS)	3–5	(GL) Sporting Liești
Izbânda Mihail Kogălniceanu (TL)	0–0 (a.e.t.) (3–4 p)	(BR) Conpet Cireșu
Callatis Mangalia (CT)	9–1	(IL) Voința Cocora
Venus Independența (CL)	2–3	(IF) Corbeanca
Bolintin Malu Spart (GR)	0–6	(AG) Atletic Bradu
Balș (OT)	1–0	(TR) Sporting Roșiori
Chitila (B)	0–1	(DB) Gloria Cornești
Recolta Dănceu (MH)	2–9	(DJ) Podari

== County leagues ==
=== Alba County ===
Pos	Team	Pld	W	D	L	GF	GA	GD	Pts	Qualification or relegation
1	CSO Cugir (C, Q)	28	24	4	0	89	16	+73	76	Qualification to promotion play-off
2	Performanța Ighiu	28	17	4	7	54	23	+31	55	
3	Sportul Sebeș	28	17	3	8	50	22	+28	54	
4	Cuprirom Abrud	28	14	6	8	56	31	+25	48 (Note: FC Cugir–Cuprirom Abrud 0–2; Cuprirom Abrud–FC Cugir 1–2)	
5	FC Cugir	28	15	3	10	60	40	+20	48	
6	Dalia Sport Daia Romană	28	12	7	9	46	37	+9	43	
7	Viitorul Sântimbru	28	13	2	13	54	61	−7	41 (Note: Viitorul Sântimbru–Olimpia Aiud 4–3; Olimpia Aiud–Viitorul Sântimbru 0–1)	
8	Olimpia Aiud	28	12	5	11	54	44	+10	41	
9	Ocna Mureș	28	10	10	8	39	47	−8	40	
10	Rapid CFR Teiuș	28	10	7	11	44	45	−1	37	
11	Arena Alba Iulia	28	10	5	13	40	56	−16	35	
12	Energia Săsciori	28	7	4	17	51	70	−19	25 (Note: Energia Săsciori–Inter Ciugud 7–3; Inter Ciugud–Energia Săsciori 0–2)	
13	Inter Ciugud	28	7	4	17	36	53	−17	25	
14	Metalul Aiud (R)	28	5	8	15	22	48	−26	23	Relegation to Liga V Alba
15	Arieșul Apuseni (R)	28	0	2	26	11	113	−102	2	Relegation to Liga V Alba
16	Zlatna (D)	0	0	0	0	0	0	0	0 (Note: Zlatna was excluded from the championship just before it started.)	Expelled

Rules for classification: 1) Points; 2) Head-to-head points; 3) Head-to-head goal difference; 4) Head-to-head goals scored; 5) Head-to-head away goals scored; 6) Goal difference; 7) Goals scored.
(C) Champions; (D) Disqualified; (Q) Qualified for the phase indicated; (R) Relegated

=== Arad County ===
Pos	Team	Pld	W	D	L	GF	GA	GD	Pts	Qualification or relegation
1	Ineu (C, Q)	34	31	0	3	121	24	+97	93	Qualification to promotion play-off
2	Gloria CTP Arad	34	27	5	2	120	20	+100	86	
3	Unirea Sântana	34	24	3	7	119	39	+80	75	
4	Șoimii Tăuț	34	20	8	6	87	60	+27	68	
5	Frontiera Curtici	34	18	8	8	83	43	+40	62	
6	Voința Mailat	34	17	7	10	66	42	+24	58	
7	Semlecana Semlac	34	15	4	15	90	62	+28	49	
8	UTA Arad II	34	13	9	12	59	45	+14	48	
9	Crișul Chișineu-Criș	34	14	1	19	54	127	−73	43	
10	Aqua Vest Arad	34	12	6	16	51	66	−15	42	
11	Păulișana Păuliș	34	12	5	17	62	74	−12	41	
12	Banatul Sânnicolau Mic	34	11	7	16	64	67	−3	38 (Note: Banatul Sânnicolau Mic deducted 2 points.)	
13	Victoria Zăbrani	34	11	3	20	47	79	−32	36	
14	Progresul Pecica	34	10	5	19	67	73	−6	35	
15	Șiriana Șiria	34	9	6	19	63	79	−16	33	
16	Viitorul Tisa Nouă	34	9	6	19	51	100	−49	33	
17	Speranța Turnu (R)	34	7	4	23	41	96	−55	25	Relegation to Liga V Arad
18	Crișul Alb Șicula (R)	34	1	1	32	32	184	−152	2 (Note: Crișul Alb Șicula deducted 2 points.)	Relegation to Liga V Arad

Source: AJF Arad
Rules for classification: 1) Points; 2) Head-to-head points; 3) Head-to-head goal difference; 4) Head-to-head goals scored; 5) Head-to-head away goals scored; 6) Goal difference; 7) Goals scored.
(C) Champions; (Q) Qualified for the phase indicated; (R) Relegated

=== Argeș County ===
Pos	Team	Pld	W	D	L	GF	GA	GD	Pts	Qualification or relegation
1	Atletic Bradu (C, Q)	32	26	3	3	113	24	+89	81	Qualification to promotion play-off
2	Dinamic Curtea de Argeș	32	24	1	7	95	54	+41	73	
3	Bascov	32	22	5	5	94	47	+47	71	
4	Valea Ursului	32	22	3	7	91	39	+52	69	
5	Rucăr	32	21	4	7	93	43	+50	67 (Note: Mioveni II–Rucăr 2–3; Rucăr–Mioveni II 2–0.)	
6	Mioveni II	32	22	1	9	74	37	+37	67	
7	Dinicu Golescu Câmpulung	32	19	2	11	75	40	+35	59 (Note: Dinicu Golescu Câmpulung–Victoria Buzoiești 3–1; Victoria Buzoiești–Dinicu Golescu Câmpulung 1–0.)	
8	Victoria Buzoiești	32	17	8	7	72	45	+27	59	
9	Sporting Pitești	32	12	6	14	70	68	+2	42	
10	DLR Pitești	32	13	2	17	58	56	+2	41 (Note: Rapid Pitești–DLR Pitești 1–4; DLR Pitești–Rapid Pitești 3–1.)	
11	Rapid Pitești	32	12	5	15	69	85	−16	41	
12	Unirea Costești	32	12	1	19	45	72	−27	37	
13	Domnești	32	6	5	21	58	97	−39	23	
14	Viitorul Ștefănești	32	6	4	22	30	85	−55	22	
15	Miroși	32	3	8	21	41	113	−72	17	
16	Stâlpeni Rădești (R)	32	2	2	28	22	106	−84	8	Relegation to Liga V Argeș
17	Olimpia Suseni (R)	32	2	2	28	33	122	−89	8	Relegation to Liga V Argeș

Rules for classification: 1) Points; 2) Head-to-head points; 3) Head-to-head goal difference; 4) Head-to-head goals scored; 5) Head-to-head away goals scored; 6) Goal difference; 7) Goals scored.
(C) Champions; (Q) Qualified for the phase indicated; (R) Relegated

=== Bacău County ===
Pos	Team	Pld	W	D	L	GF	GA	GD	Pts	Qualification or relegation
1	Negri (C, Q)	34	29	3	2	136	25	+111	90	Qualification to promotion play-off
2	Sport Club Bacău II	34	29	0	5	147	29	+118	87	
3	Sportul Răcăciuni	33	26	2	5	94	35	+59	80	
4	Căiuți	34	24	2	8	83	40	+43	74	
5	Voința Oituz	34	21	1	12	102	62	+40	64	
6	Dinamo Onești	34	18	4	12	110	57	+53	58	
7	Nicolae Bălcescu	34	16	7	11	68	50	+18	55	
8	Târgu Ocna	34	14	4	16	54	84	−30	46	
9	Uzu Dărmănești	33	14	3	16	62	63	−1	45	
10	Aerostar Bacău II	34	13	2	19	79	78	+1	41	
11	Măgura Cașin	34	13	0	21	76	132	−56	39	
12	Consart Biruința Bacău	34	11	2	21	63	99	−36	35	
13	Siretu	34	10	4	20	56	99	−43	34	
14	Athletic Comănești	34	10	2	22	71	109	−38	32	
15	Voința Gârleni	34	8	8	18	50	89	−39	32	
16	Filipești	34	10	2	22	64	112	−48	32	
17	Flamura Roșie Sascut (O)	34	10	1	23	42	103	−61	31	Qualification to relegation play-off
18	Forestierul Agăș (R)	34	5	1	28	30	121	−91	16 (Note: Forestierul Agăș withdrew during the winter break and lost all matches from the second part with 0–3.)	Relegation to Liga V Bacău

Rules for classification: 1) Points; 2) Head-to-head points; 3) Head-to-head goal difference; 4) Head-to-head goals scored; 5) Head-to-head away goals scored; 6) Goal difference; 7) Goals scored.
(C) Champions; (O) Play-off winners; (Q) Qualified for the phase indicated; (R) Relegated
Notes:

Relegation play-off

The 17th-placed team of the Liga IV faces the 2nd placed team from Liga V Bacău. The match played on 30 June 2013.

Team 1	Score	Team 2
Flamura Roșie Sascut	2–2 (4–1 p)	Dofteana

=== Bihor County ===
Pos	Team	Pld	W	D	L	GF	GA	GD	Pts	Qualification or relegation
1	Kinder Junior Paleu (C, Q)	28	24	2	2	76	23	+53	74	Qualification for promotion play-Off
2	Crișul Sântandrei	28	21	0	7	69	24	+45	63	
3	Hidișelu de Sus	28	19	4	5	65	38	+27	61	
4	Poiana Budureasa	28	14	5	9	51	43	+8	47	
5	Liberty Oradea	28	12	4	12	55	45	+10	40	
6	Ștei	28	11	6	11	39	41	−2	39 (Note: Sânmartin–Ștei 2–0; Ștei–Sânmartin 3–0;)	
7	Sânmartin	28	11	6	11	36	39	−3	39	
8	Victoria Avram Iancu	28	11	5	12	56	58	−2	38	
9	Viitorul Marghita	28	11	4	13	32	40	−8	37	
10	Biharea Vașcău	28	10	5	13	36	46	−10	35	
11	Luceafărul Oradea II	28	9	3	16	50	60	−10	30 (Note: Luceafărul Oradea–Viitorul Borș 2–1; Viitorul Borș–Luceafărul Oradea 1–0;)	
12	Viitorul Borș	28	8	6	14	46	60	−14	30	
13	Crișul Aleșd	28	7	7	14	36	52	−16	28	
14	Cetatea Valea lui Mihai (R)	28	5	5	18	34	60	−26	20	Relegation to Liga V Bihor
15	Locadin Țețchea (R)	28	3	6	19	36	88	−52	15	Relegation to Liga V Bihor
16	Bayern Oradea (R)	0	0	0	0	0	0	0	0 (Note: Bayern Oradea withdrew after 14 rounds and all its results were canceled.)	Expelled

Rules for classification: Rules for classification: 1) Points 2) Head-to-head points; 3) Head-to-head goal difference; 4) Head-to-head goals scored; 5) Head-to-head away goals scored; 6) Goal difference; 7) Goals scored.
(C) Champions; (Q) Qualified for the phase indicated; (R) Relegated

=== Bistrița-Năsăud County ===
Pos	Team	Pld	W	D	L	GF	GA	GD	Pts	Qualification or relegation
1	Heniu Prundu Bârgăului (C, Q)	26	22	0	4	120	21	+99	66	Qualification to promotion play-off
2	Viticola Dumitra	26	18	3	5	91	40	+51	57	
3	Viitorul Lechința	26	17	1	8	82	43	+39	52	
4	Progresul Năsăud	26	16	3	7	81	56	+25	51	
5	Hebe Sângeorz-Băi	26	16	3	7	66	47	+19	51	
6	Silvicultorul Maieru	26	13	7	6	92	49	+43	46	
7	Atletico Monor	26	12	3	11	47	42	+5	39	
8	Steaua Monariu	26	11	5	10	64	68	−4	38	
9	Eciro Forest Telciu	26	12	2	12	56	62	−6	38	
10	Voința Cetate	26	10	4	12	54	54	0	34	
11	Universitatea Șirioara	26	5	7	14	37	62	−25	22	
12	Victoria Uriu	26	4	2	20	39	99	−60	14	
13	Unirea Ciceu-Giurgești (R)	26	4	0	22	39	136	−97	12	Relegation to Liga V Bistrița-Năsăud
14	Real Buduș (R)	26	1	2	23	25	114	−89	5	Relegation to Liga V Bistrița-Năsăud

Rules for classification: 1) Points; 2) Head-to-head points; 3) Head-to-head goal difference; 4) Head-to-head goals scored; 5) Head-to-head away goals scored; 6) Goal difference; 7) Goals scored.
(C) Champions; (Q) Qualified for the phase indicated; (R) Relegated

=== Botoșani County ===
Pos	Team	Pld	W	D	L	GF	GA	GD	Pts	Qualification or relegation
1	Luceafărul Mihai Eminescu (C, Q)	30	24	6	0	82	14	+68	78	Qualification to promotion play-off
2	Dante Botoșani	30	23	5	2	80	24	+56	74	
3	Viitorul Dersca	30	19	3	8	89	43	+46	60	
4	Darabani	30	16	6	8	69	45	+24	54	
5	Bucovina Rogojești	30	13	5	12	70	69	+1	44	
6	Rapid Ungureni	30	13	2	15	69	72	−3	41	
7	Microbuzul Botoșani	30	12	5	13	56	58	−2	41	
8	Păltiniș	30	12	4	14	54	56	−2	40	
9	Bucecea	29	12	3	14	50	67	−17	39	
10	Sportivul Trușești	30	11	5	14	71	65	+6	38	
11	Flacăra 1907 Flămânzi	30	11	4	15	54	59	−5	37	
12	Avântul Albești	30	10	5	15	58	81	−23	35	
13	Roma	30	9	5	16	66	58	+8	32	
14	Prosport Vârfu Câmpului (O)	30	9	2	19	46	74	−28	29	Qualification to relegation play-off
15	Zona Botoșani (O)	30	6	5	19	31	84	−53	23	Qualification to relegation play-off
16	Mihălășeni (R)	29	4	5	20	33	109	−76	17	Relegation to Liga V Botoșani

Rules for classification: 1) Points; 2) Head-to-head points; 3) Head-to-head goal difference; 4) Head-to-head goals scored; 5) Head-to-head away goals scored; 6) Goal difference; 7) Goals scored.
(C) Champions; (O) Play-off winners; (Q) Qualified for the phase indicated; (R) Relegated

Relegation play-off

The 14th and 15th-placed teams of the Liga IV faces the 2nd placed teams from the two series of Liga V Botoșani.

Team 1	Score	Team 2
Voința Șendriceni	0–2	Zona Botoșani
Sulița	1–2	Prosport Vârfu Câmpului

=== Brașov County ===
Pos	Team	Pld	W	D	L	GF	GA	GD	Pts	Qualification or relegation
1	Râșnov (C, Q)	26	20	3	3	95	25	+70	63	Qualification to promotion play-off
2	Zărnești	26	20	2	4	77	27	+50	62	
3	Inter Cristian	26	18	4	4	85	33	+52	58	
4	Viitorul Ghimbav	26	17	2	7	68	35	+33	53	
5	Înfrățirea Agromec Hărman	26	15	3	8	57	30	+27	48	
6	Brașov II	26	13	2	11	60	43	+17	41	
7	Carpați Berivoi	26	11	6	9	57	58	−1	39	
8	Cetatea Rupea-Homorod	26	10	3	13	53	70	−17	33	
9	Ghimbav 2000	26	8	5	13	47	62	−15	29	
10	CFR Brașov	26	9	2	15	47	51	−4	29	
11	Energia Unirea Feldioara	26	7	3	16	43	71	−28	24	
12	Aripile Brașov	26	6	4	16	38	92	−54	22	
13	Olimpic Voila	26	5	4	17	19	78	−59	19	
14	Bucegi Predeal	26	1	1	24	11	82	−71	4	
15	Viromet Victoria (D)	0	0	0	0	0	0	0	0 (Note: Viromet Victoria withdrew after 5 rounds and all its results were canceled.)	Withdrew

Rules for classification: 1) Points; 2) Head-to-head points; 3) Head-to-head goal difference; 4) Head-to-head goals scored; 5) Head-to-head away goals scored; 6) Goal difference; 7) Goals scored.
(C) Champions; (D) Disqualified; (Q) Qualified for the phase indicated

=== Brăila County ===
Pos	Team	Pld	W	D	L	GF	GA	GD	Pts	Qualification or relegation
1	Avântul Conpet Cireșu (C, Q)	30	27	3	0	130	16	+114	84	Qualification to promotion play-off
2	Viitorul Însurăței	30	21	3	6	98	34	+64	66	
3	Victoria Traian	30	19	5	6	74	39	+35	62	
4	Tufești	30	19	5	6	101	54	+47	62	
5	Dunărea Gropeni	30	18	3	9	97	47	+50	57	
6	Pandurii Tudor Vladimirescu	30	18	2	10	83	48	+35	56	
7	Sportul Chiscani	30	14	9	7	80	44	+36	51	
8	Victoria Cazasu	30	13	7	10	65	66	−1	46	
9	Voința Vișani	30	15	0	15	61	81	−20	45	
10	Făurei	30	14	2	14	67	60	+7	44	
11	Viitorul Ianca	30	10	5	15	58	73	−15	35	
12	Gloria Movila Miresii	30	8	4	18	62	78	−16	28	
13	Avântul Mircea Vodă	30	6	3	21	43	126	−83	21	
14	Voința Surdila-Găiseanca	30	4	2	24	31	121	−90	14	
15	Voința Șuțești (R)	30	4	1	25	43	130	−87	13 (Note: Voința Șuțești - Viitorul Galbenu was approved with the score of 0–3 against both teams.)	Relegation to Liga V Brăila
16	Viitorul Galbenu (R)	30	2	0	28	34	115	−81	6	Relegation to Liga V Brăila

Rules for classification: 1) Points; 2) Head-to-head points; 3) Head-to-head goal difference; 4) Head-to-head goals scored; 5) Head-to-head away goals scored; 6) Goal difference; 7) Goals scored.
(C) Champions; (Q) Qualified for the phase indicated; (R) Relegated

=== Bucharest ===
Seria 1

Pos	Team	Pld	W	D	L	GF	GA	GD	Pts	Qualification or relegation
1	Termo București	24	20	2	2	98	34	+64	62	Qualification to championship play-off
2	Chitila	24	17	5	2	120	23	+97	56	Qualification to championship play-off
3	Concordia Chiajna III	24	17	2	5	93	32	+61	53	Qualification to championship play-off
4	1 Decembrie	24	16	3	5	105	41	+64	51	Qualification to championship play-off
5	Ilie Oană București	24	13	3	8	58	46	+12	42	
6	Voluntari II	24	13	1	10	76	51	+25	40	
7	Romprim București	24	11	2	11	64	58	+6	35	
8	Progresul București	24	10	5	9	52	58	−6	35	
9	Electrica București	24	9	1	14	40	69	−29	28	
10	LPS Mircea Eliade București	24	7	0	17	52	99	−47	21	
11	Sportul Studențesc București III	24	5	0	19	33	76	−43	15	
12	Progresul Cernica II	24	2	3	19	30	112	−82	9	
13	Aversa București	24	1	3	20	39	161	−122	6	
14	Zamsport București (D)	0	0	0	0	0	0	0	0 (Note: Zamsport excluded in the first part of the season and all its results were canceled.)	Excluded

Rules for classification: 1) Points; 2) Head-to-head points; 3) Head-to-head goal difference; 4) Head-to-head goals scored; 5) Head-to-head away goals scored; 6) Goal difference; 7) Goals scored.
(D) Disqualified
Notes:

Seria 2

Pos	Team	Pld	W	D	L	GF	GA	GD	Pts	Qualification or relegation
1	Dobroești	30	28	1	1	200	31	+169	85	Qualification to championship play-off
2	Athletico Floreasca	30	20	2	8	95	51	+44	62	Qualification to championship play-off
3	Săbărelul Ciocoveni	30	19	2	9	92	63	+29	59 (Note: Săbărelul Ciocoveni withdrew before the start of the play-offs.)	Withdrew
4	Comprest GIM București	30	18	4	8	62	47	+15	58	Qualification to championship play-off
5	Juventus București II	30	17	4	9	79	55	+24	55 (Note: Juventus București II ineligible for promotion.)	Ineligible
6	GVD București	30	16	5	9	100	62	+38	53 (Note: GVD București declined to participate in the play-offs.)	Declined
7	LSM București	30	16	2	12	76	51	+25	50	Qualification to championship play-off
8	Smart Ionescu București	30	13	5	12	69	70	−1	44	
9	Juniorul București	30	12	6	12	76	61	+15	42	
10	Unirea Tricolor București	30	12	3	15	61	72	−11	39	
11	Electroaparataj București	30	12	2	16	66	86	−20	38	
12	Pantelimon	30	11	3	16	58	81	−23	36	
13	Spicul Rompan București	30	8	4	18	67	117	−50	28	
14	Coresi București	30	5	3	22	44	119	−75	18	
15	Frăția București	30	5	0	25	45	162	−117	15	
16	Tracțiunea București	30	4	2	24	34	96	−62	14	

Rules for classification: 1) Points; 2) Head-to-head points; 3) Head-to-head goal difference; 4) Head-to-head goals scored; 5) Head-to-head away goals scored; 6) Goal difference; 7) Goals scored.
Notes:

Championship play-off
Group 1

All matches were played at Rocar Stadium in Bucharest on 24, 27 and 29 May 2013.

Pos	Team	Pld	W	D	L	GF	GA	GD	Pts	Qualification	CHI	DEC	DOB	LSM
1	Chitila (Q)	3	2	1	0	6	3	+3	7	Qualification to semi-finals		3–2	1–1	
2	1 Decembrie (Q)	3	2	0	1	6	4	+2	6	Qualification to semi-finals				2–0
3	Dobroești	3	1	1	1	6	3	+3	4			1–2		4–0
4	LSM București	3	0	0	3	0	8	−8	0		0–2			

Rules for classification: 1) Points; 2) Head-to-head points; 3) Head-to-head goal difference; 4) Head-to-head goals scored; 5) Head-to-head away goals scored; 6) Goal difference; 7) Goals scored.
(Q) Qualified for the phase indicated

Group 2

All matches were played at Romprim Stadium in Bucharest on 23, 25 and 28 May 2013.

Pos	Team	Pld	W	D	L	GF	GA	GD	Pts	Qualification	TER	C3C	COM	ATF
1	Termo București (Q)	3	2	0	1	12	4	+8	6	Qualification to semi-finals		2–3	4–0	
2	Concordia Chiajna III (Q)	3	1	1	1	3	5	−2	4	Qualification to semi-finals			0–0	
3	Comprest GIM București	3	1	1	1	4	7	−3	4					4–3
4	Athletico Floreasca	3	1	0	2	7	10	−3	3		1–6	3–0		

Rules for classification: 1) Points; 2) Head-to-head points; 3) Head-to-head goal difference; 4) Head-to-head goals scored; 5) Head-to-head away goals scored; 6) Goal difference; 7) Goals scored.
(Q) Qualified for the phase indicated

Semi-finals

Team 1	Score	Team 2
Chitila	4–2	Termo București
Concordia Chiajna III	4–1	1 Decembrie

Final

Team 1	Score	Team 2
Chitila	2–0	Concordia Chiajna III

Chitila won the 2012–13 Liga IV Bucharest and qualify to promotion play-off in Liga III.

=== Buzău County ===
Series I

Pos	Team	Pld	W	D	L	GF	GA	GD	Pts	Qualification or relegation
1	Foresta Nehoiu (Q)	26	21	2	3	99	28	+71	65	Qualification to championship play-off
2	Partizanul Merei (Q)	26	18	4	4	74	39	+35	58	Qualification to championship play-off
3	ABC Stoicescu	26	18	2	6	116	40	+76	56	
4	Șoimii Siriu	26	14	3	9	63	54	+9	45	
5	Viitorul 08 Vernești	26	13	5	8	56	39	+17	44	
6	Victoria Boboc	26	12	4	10	75	69	+6	40	
7	Șoimii Cândești	26	11	5	10	66	69	−3	38	
8	Viitorul Tisău	25	9	6	10	55	49	+6	33	
9	Petrolul Berca	25	9	6	10	46	43	+3	33	
10	Progresul Beceni	26	9	3	14	24	48	−24	30	
11	Montana Pătârlagele	26	8	3	15	44	58	−14	27	
12	Unirea Mărăcineni	26	7	4	15	40	78	−38	25	
13	Recolta Cislău	26	5	2	19	31	97	−66	11 (Note: Recolta Cislău deducted 6 points.)	
14	Chiojdu	26	1	3	22	26	104	−78	6	

Rules for classification: 1) Points; 2) Head-to-head points; 3) Head-to-head goal difference; 4) Head-to-head goals scored; 5) Head-to-head away goals scored; 6) Goal difference; 7) Goals scored.
(Q) Qualified for the phase indicated
Notes:

Series II

Pos	Team	Pld	W	D	L	GF	GA	GD	Pts	Qualification or relegation
1	Pescărușul Luciu (Q)	24	21	2	1	99	28	+71	59 (Note: Pescărușul Luciu deducted 6 points.)	Qualification to championship play-off
2	Locomotiva Buzău (Q)	24	17	3	4	65	20	+45	54	Qualification to championship play-off
3	Unirea Stâlpu (Q)	24	14	3	7	41	37	+4	45	Qualification to championship play-off
4	Tricolorul Gălbinași	24	12	5	7	47	42	+5	41	
5	Voința Căldărăști	24	10	6	8	47	40	+7	36	
6	Diadema Gherăseni	24	10	5	9	43	40	+3	35	
7	Voința Limpeziș	24	9	4	11	51	48	+3	31	
8	Viitorul Rușețu	24	9	4	11	45	51	−6	31	
9	Olimpia Pogoanele	24	8	4	12	53	57	−4	28	
10	Șoimii Costești	24	7	4	13	32	52	−20	25	
11	Steaua Săhăteni	23	4	7	12	26	42	−16	19	
12	Luceafărul Maxenu	23	5	3	15	38	93	−55	18	
13	Cereanim Smeeni	24	2	4	18	20	57	−37	10	

Rules for classification: 1) Points; 2) Head-to-head points; 3) Head-to-head goal difference; 4) Head-to-head goals scored; 5) Head-to-head away goals scored; 6) Goal difference; 7) Goals scored.
(Q) Qualified for the phase indicated
Notes:

Series III

Pos	Team	Pld	W	D	L	GF	GA	GD	Pts	Qualification or relegation
1	Puiești (Q)	26	24	1	1	135	17	+118	67 (Note: Puiești and Voința Lanurile were deducted 6 points.)	Qualification to championship play-off
2	Voința Lanurile (Q)	26	24	1	1	90	12	+78	67	Qualification to championship play-off
3	Avântul Spartac Zărnești (Q)	26	17	2	7	69	33	+36	53	Qualification to championship play-off
4	Recolta Boldu	26	13	6	7	58	40	+18	45	
5	Săgeata	26	12	4	10	67	51	+16	40	
6	Metalul Buzău	26	12	4	10	52	58	−6	40	
7	Victoria Buda	25	11	4	10	52	58	−6	37	
8	Recolta Sălcioara	26	10	4	12	56	71	−15	34	
9	Onix Râmnicu Sărat	26	9	3	14	46	47	−1	30	
10	Valconf Valea Râmnicului	25	6	5	14	33	53	−20	23	
11	Înfrățirea Zoița	26	6	4	16	33	66	−33	22	
12	Victoria Grebanu	26	6	2	18	40	80	−40	20	
13	Gloria Vadu Pașii	25	4	4	17	28	82	−54	16	
14	Voința Cochirleanca	25	2	4	19	30	121	−91	10	

Rules for classification: 1) Points; 2) Head-to-head points; 3) Head-to-head goal difference; 4) Head-to-head goals scored; 5) Head-to-head away goals scored; 6) Goal difference; 7) Goals scored.
(Q) Qualified for the phase indicated
Notes:

Championship play-off
Quarter-finals

Team 1	Score	Team 2
Pescărușul Luciu	3–1	Unirea Stâlpu
Foresta Nehoiu	4–2	Locomotiva Buzău
Voința Lanurile	2–0	Avântul Spartac Zărnești
Puiești	5–0	Partizanul Merei

Semi-finals

Team 1	Score	Team 2
Puiești	0–1	Voința Lanurile
Foresta Nehoiu	2–3	Pescărușul Luciu

Final

The championship final was played on 9 June 2013 at Gloria Stadium in Buzău.

Team 1	Score	Team 2
Voința Lanurile	2–0	Pescărușul Luciu

Voința Lanurile won the 2012–13 Liga IV Buzău County and qualify to promotion play-off in Liga III.

=== Caraș-Severin County ===
Pos	Team	Pld	W	D	L	GF	GA	GD	Pts	Qualification or relegation
1	Metalul Oțelu Roșu (C, Q)	32	27	4	1	96	14	+82	85	Qualification to promotion play-off
2	Voința Lupac	32	28	0	4	139	19	+120	84	
3	Metalul Bocșa	32	21	2	9	101	37	+64	65	
4	Moldova Nouă	32	19	5	8	83	29	+54	62	
5	Berzasca	32	19	2	11	73	44	+29	59	
6	Minerul Dognecea	32	19	1	12	79	56	+23	58	
7	Oravița	32	18	3	11	99	55	+44	57	
8	Gloria Reșița	32	16	8	8	61	29	+32	56	
9	Bistra Glimboca	32	16	3	13	73	57	+16	51	
10	Croația Clocotici	32	15	5	12	63	48	+15	50	
11	Scorilo Autocatania Caransebeș II	32	15	2	15	58	56	+2	47	
12	Nera Bozovici	32	13	5	14	51	62	−11	44	
13	Semenicul Văliug	32	11	2	19	59	87	−28	35	
14	Prolaz Karaševo (R)	31	4	2	25	19	92	−73	14 (Note: Prolaz Karaševo and Hercules Băile Herculane withdrew from the championship and lost all the matches from the second part of the season with 0-3.)	Relegation to Liga V Caraș-Severin
15	Minerul Anina	32	4	0	28	23	141	−118	12	
16	Voința Răcășdia	32	3	0	29	32	185	−153	9	
17	Hercules Băile Herculane (R)	31	1	0	30	9	107	−98	3	Relegation to Liga V Caraș-Severin

Rules for classification: 1) Points; 2) Head-to-head points; 3) Head-to-head goal difference; 4) Head-to-head goals scored; 5) Head-to-head away goals scored; 6) Goal difference; 7) Goals scored.
(C) Champions; (Q) Qualified for the phase indicated; (R) Relegated

=== Călărași County ===
Pos	Team	Pld	W	D	L	GF	GA	GD	Pts	Qualification or relegation
1	Venus Independența (C, Q)	30	26	3	1	144	24	+120	81	Qualification to promotion play-off
2	Dunărea Ciocănești	30	22	5	3	153	39	+114	71	
3	Înainte Modelu	30	18	4	8	79	44	+35	58	
4	Progresul Fundulea	30	15	5	10	63	60	+3	50	
5	Unirea Mânăstirea	30	14	6	10	66	52	+14	48	
6	Avântul Dor Mărunt	30	13	8	9	65	59	+6	47	
7	Victoria Lehliu	30	12	6	12	60	46	+14	42	
8	Agricola Borcea	30	12	4	14	70	77	−7	40	
9	Victoria Dragoș Vodă	30	12	2	16	51	74	−23	38	
10	Rapid Ulmeni	30	12	2	16	61	92	−31	38	
11	Viitorul Sohatu	30	10	7	13	65	69	−4	37	
12	Dinamo Sărulești	30	11	3	16	55	101	−46	36	
13	Steaua Radovanu (O)	30	10	4	16	60	83	−23	34	Qualification to relegation play-off
14	Viitorul Plătărești (R)	30	7	5	18	38	80	−42	26	Qualification to relegation play-off
15	Fortuna Tămădău (R)	30	6	3	21	41	102	−61	21	Relegation to Liga V Călărași
16	Curcani (R)	30	5	3	22	43	112	−69	18	Relegation to Liga V Călărași

Rules for classification: 1) Points; 2) Head-to-head points; 3) Head-to-head goal difference; 4) Head-to-head goals scored; 5) Head-to-head away goals scored; 6) Goal difference; 7) Goals scored.
(C) Champions; (O) Play-off winners; (Q) Qualified for the phase indicated; (R) Relegated

Relegation play-off

The 13th and 14th-placed teams of the Liga IV faces the 2nd placed teams from the two series of Liga V Călărași.

Team 1	Agg.	Team 2	1st leg	2nd leg
Dunărea Grădiștea	4–2	Viitorul Plătărești	1–2	3–0
Belciugatele	2–3	Steaua Radovanu	2–0	0–3

=== Cluj County ===
Pos	Team	Pld	W	D	L	GF	GA	GD	Pts	Qualification or relegation
1	Unirea Jucu (C, Q)	24	20	2	2	97	22	+75	62	Qualification to promotion play-off
2	CFR Cluj-Napoca II	24	20	1	3	113	24	+89	61	
3	Viitorul Gârbău	24	16	2	6	71	41	+30	50	
4	Atletic Olimpia Gherla	24	16	1	7	66	39	+27	49	
5	Vulturii Vultureni	24	16	1	7	86	46	+40	49	
6	Someșul Apahida	24	14	2	8	58	32	+26	44	
7	Vulturul Mintiu Gherlii	24	9	2	13	38	51	−13	29	
8	Industria Sârmei 1921 Câmpia Turzii	24	9	2	13	35	51	−16	29	
9	Unirea Florești	24	9	1	14	51	76	−25	28	
10	Someșul Gilău	24	7	2	15	53	74	−21	23	
11	CFR Dej	24	4	1	19	28	81	−53	13	
12	Unirea Tritenii de Jos	24	3	3	18	29	103	−74	12	
13	Aghireșu	24	3	0	21	25	110	−85	9	

Rules for classification: 1) Points; 2) Head-to-head points; 3) Head-to-head goal difference; 4) Head-to-head goals scored; 5) Head-to-head away goals scored; 6) Goal difference; 7) Goals scored.
(C) Champions; (Q) Qualified for the phase indicated

=== Constanța County ===
East Series

Pos	Team	Pld	W	D	L	GF	GA	GD	Pts	Qualification
1	Callatis 2012 Mangalia	20	18	1	1	95	19	+76	55	Qualification to championship play-off
2	Agigea	20	14	3	3	81	30	+51	45	Qualification to championship play-off
3	CFR Constanța	20	11	3	6	53	41	+12	36	Qualification to championship play-off
4	Portul Constanța	20	9	4	7	36	33	+3	31	Qualification to championship play-off
5	Ovidiu	20	9	1	10	59	60	−1	28	Qualification to championship play-off
6	Vulturii Cazino Constanța	20	8	3	9	53	57	−4	27	Qualification to championship play-off
7	Eforie	20	8	1	11	48	52	−4	25	Qualification to championship play-out
8	Sparta Techirghiol	20	6	4	10	38	50	−12	22	Qualification to championship play-out
9	Aurora 23 August	20	5	4	11	37	64	−27	19	Qualification to championship play-out
10	Victoria Cumpăna	20	5	3	12	19	45	−26	18	Qualification to championship play-out
11	Cogealac	20	3	1	16	23	91	−68	10	Qualification to championship play-out

Rules for classification: 1) Points; 2) Head-to-head points; 3) Head-to-head goal difference; 4) Head-to-head goals scored; 5) Head-to-head away goals scored; 6) Goal difference; 7) Goals scored.

West Series

Pos	Team	Pld	W	D	L	GF	GA	GD	Pts	Qualification
1	Mihail Kogălniceanu	20	18	1	1	99	21	+78	55	Qualification to championship play-off
2	Danubius Rasova	20	13	1	6	57	28	+29	40	Qualification to championship play-off
3	Perla Murfatlar	20	11	6	3	59	26	+33	39	Qualification to championship play-off
4	Gloria Băneasa	20	11	3	6	58	40	+18	36	Qualification to championship play-off
5	Știința ACALAB Poarta Albă	20	10	3	7	39	42	−3	33	Qualification to championship play-off
6	Cernavodă	20	9	5	6	35	30	+5	32	Qualification to championship play-off
7	CSȘ Medgidia	20	9	4	7	47	43	+4	31	Qualification to championship play-out
8	Carsium Hârșova	20	5	2	13	34	70	−36	17	Qualification to championship play-out
9	Carvăn Lipnița	20	4	1	15	24	63	−39	13	Qualification to championship play-out
10	Recolta Nicolae Bălcescu	20	3	2	15	31	61	−30	11	Qualification to championship play-out
11	Tineretul Valea Dacilor	20	2	2	16	22	81	−59	8	Qualification to championship play-out

Rules for classification: 1) Points; 2) Head-to-head points; 3) Head-to-head goal difference; 4) Head-to-head goals scored; 5) Head-to-head away goals scored; 6) Goal difference; 7) Goals scored.

Championship play-off

The teams started the play-off with all the records achieved in the regular season and played only against the teams from the other series.

Pos	Team	Pld	W	D	L	GF	GA	GD	Pts	Qualification
1	Callatis 2012 Mangalia (C, Q)	32	29	2	1	168	33	+135	89	Qualification to promotion play-off
2	Agigea	32	24	4	4	112	43	+69	76	
3	Mihail Kogălniceanu	32	22	4	6	122	41	+81	70	
4	Danubius Rasova	32	17	5	10	88	61	+27	56	
5	CFR Constanța	32	16	6	10	87	65	+22	54	
6	Perla Murfatlar	32	15	8	9	79	69	+10	53	
7	Gloria Băneasa	32	14	5	13	84	94	−10	47	
8	Ovidiu	32	14	4	14	98	94	+4	46	
9	Portul Constanța	32	13	6	13	55	47	+8	45	
10	Cernavodă	32	13	6	13	52	51	+1	45	
11	Știința ACALAB Poarta Albă	32	13	3	16	57	87	−30	42	
12	Vulturii Cazino Constanța	32	11	5	16	73	93	−20	38	

Rules for classification: 1) Points; 2) Head-to-head points; 3) Head-to-head goal difference; 4) Head-to-head goals scored; 5) Head-to-head away goals scored; 6) Goal difference; 7) Goals scored.
(C) Champions; (Q) Qualified for the phase indicated

Championship play-out

The teams started the play-out with all the records achieved in the regular season and played only against the teams from the other series.

Pos	Team	Pld	W	D	L	GF	GA	GD	Pts	Relegation
13	Eforie	30	16	3	11	102	70	+32	51	
14	Sparta Techirghiol	30	12	5	13	65	67	−2	41	
15	Victoria Cumpăna	30	11	5	14	41	56	−15	38	
16	CSȘ Medgidia	30	11	5	14	62	80	−18	38	
17	Aurora 23 August	30	10	4	16	63	87	−24	34	
18	Cogealac	30	10	2	18	62	105	−43	32	
19	Carsium Hârșova	30	8	3	19	53	108	−55	27	
20	Carvăn Lipnița	30	8	1	21	40	85	−45	25	
21	Recolta Nicolae Bălcescu (R)	30	5	6	19	53	87	−34	21	Relegation to Liga V Constanța
22	Tineretul Valea Dacilor (R)	30	3	2	25	33	126	−93	11	Relegation to Liga V Constanța

Rules for classification: 1) Points; 2) Head-to-head points; 3) Head-to-head goal difference; 4) Head-to-head goals scored; 5) Head-to-head away goals scored; 6) Goal difference; 7) Goals scored.
(R) Relegated

=== Covasna County ===
Pos	Team	Pld	W	D	L	GF	GA	GD	Pts	Qualification or relegation
1	Păpăuți (C, Q)	28	25	1	2	103	16	+87	76	Qualification to promotion play-off
2	Sepsi OSK	28	22	2	4	86	16	+70	68	
3	Avântul Ilieni	28	19	3	6	76	38	+38	60	
4	Nemere Ghelința	28	17	3	8	57	20	+37	54	
5	Brețcu	28	14	1	13	60	49	+11	43	
6	Dolores Venus Covasna	28	13	4	11	56	46	+10	43	
7	Prima Brăduț	28	13	3	12	54	45	+9	42	
8	Ojdula	28	13	2	13	62	53	+9	41	
9	Baraolt	28	10	0	18	50	66	−16	30	
10	Stăruința Bodoc	28	8	5	15	38	60	−22	29	
11	Ciucașul Întorsura Buzăului	28	7	6	15	37	59	−22	27	
12	BSE Belin	28	8	2	18	30	95	−65	26	
13	Progresul Sita Buzăului	28	8	1	19	53	99	−46	25	
14	Perko Sânzieni	28	7	3	18	31	63	−32	24	
15	Cernat	28	8	0	20	35	105	−70	24	Relegation to Liga V Covasna
16	KSE Târgu Secuiesc (R)	0	0	0	0	0	0	0	0 (Note: KSE Târgu Secuiesc withdrew after 4 rounds and all its results were canceled.)	Withdrew

Rules for classification: 1) Points; 2) Head-to-head points; 3) Head-to-head goal difference; 4) Head-to-head goals scored; 5) Head-to-head away goals scored; 6) Goal difference; 7) Goals scored.
(C) Champions; (Q) Qualified for the phase indicated; (R) Relegated

=== Dâmbovița County ===
Pos	Team	Pld	W	D	L	GF	GA	GD	Pts	Qualification or relegation
1	Gloria Cornești (C, Q)	32	26	3	3	140	18	+122	81	Qualification to promotion play-off
2	Flacăra Moreni	32	23	6	3	100	19	+81	75	
3	Aninoasa	32	23	3	6	92	37	+55	72	
4	Bradul Moroieni	32	18	6	8	58	37	+21	60	
5	Atletic Fieni	32	15	10	7	73	53	+20	55	
6	Gaz Metan Finta	32	16	1	15	73	89	−16	48 (Note: Gaz Metan Finta and Petrolul Valea Mare deducted 2 points.)	
7	Petrolul Tărgoviște	32	14	6	12	64	53	+11	45 (Note: Petrolul Tărgoviște deducted 3 points.)	
8	Comerțul Brezoaele	32	13	3	16	56	72	−16	42	
9	Recolta Gura Șuții	32	12	5	15	60	61	−1	41	
10	Voința Steaua Pietroșița	32	12	1	19	54	78	−24	37	
11	Voința Perșinari	32	12	1	19	48	87	−39	37	
12	PAS Pucioasa	32	11	3	18	47	67	−20	36	
13	Conțești (R)	31	11	3	17	32	59	−27	36 (Note: Conțești and Utchim Găești withdrew in the second part of the season and lost all remaining matches with 0–3.)	Relegation to Liga V Dâmbovița
14	Doicești	32	10	5	17	47	66	−19	35	
15	Petrolul Valea Mare	32	9	5	18	50	97	−47	32	
16	Utchim Găești (R)	31	7	3	21	28	65	−37	24	Relegation to Liga V Dâmbovița
17	Avântul Produlești	32	5	4	23	46	110	−64	19	
18	Comerțul Viișoara (D)	0	0	0	0	0	0	0	0 (Note: Comerțul Viișoara withdrew after 9 rounds and all its results were canceled.)	Withdrew

Rules for classification: 1) Points; 2) Head-to-head points; 3) Head-to-head goal difference; 4) Head-to-head goals scored; 5) Head-to-head away goals scored; 6) Goal difference; 7) Goals scored.
(C) Champions; (D) Disqualified; (Q) Qualified for the phase indicated; (R) Relegated

=== Dolj County ===
Pos	Team	Pld	W	D	L	GF	GA	GD	Pts	Qualification or relegation
1	Podari (Q)	28	22	2	4	109	26	+83	68	Qualification to play-off
2	Dunărea Calafat (Q)	28	21	5	2	98	23	+75	68	Qualification to play-off
3	Prometeu Craiova (Q)	28	20	2	6	87	33	+54	62	Qualification to play-off
4	Filiași (Q)	28	17	4	7	65	33	+32	55	Qualification to play-off
5	Ișalnița	28	16	4	8	63	39	+24	52	
6	Recolta Ostroveni	28	12	5	11	66	67	−1	41	
7	Progresul Segarcea	28	12	4	12	59	59	0	40	
8	Amaradia Melinești	28	11	5	12	64	69	−5	38	
9	Avântul Pielești	28	12	1	15	63	83	−20	37	
10	Viitorul Cârcea	28	10	5	13	51	48	+3	35	
11	Leamna	28	9	3	16	58	69	−11	30	
12	Știința U Craiova	28	7	7	14	39	63	−24	28	
13	ȘF "Gică Popescu" Craiova	28	6	6	16	51	77	−26	24	
14	Dynamik Craiova	28	5	0	23	38	145	−107	15	
15	Energia Craiova	28	2	3	23	33	110	−77	9	
16	Progresul Băilești (D)	0	0	0	0	0	0	0	0 (Note: Progresul Băilești withdrew in the first part of the season and all its results were canceled.)	Withdrew

Rules for classification: 1) Points; 2) Head-to-head points; 3) Head-to-head goal difference; 4) Head-to-head goals scored; 5) Head-to-head away goals scored; 6) Goal difference; 7) Goals scored.
(D) Disqualified; (Q) Qualified for the phase indicated
Notes:

Championship play-off

The results between the qualified teams was maintained in the championship play-off.

Pos	Team	Pld	W	D	L	GF	GA	GD	Pts	Qualification
1	Podari (C, Q)	12	7	3	2	23	14	+9	24	Qualification for promotion play-off
2	Dunărea Calafat	12	7	1	4	20	12	+8	22	
3	Filiași	12	4	2	6	14	18	−4	14	
4	Prometeu Craiova	12	2	2	8	14	27	−13	8	

Rules for classification: 1) Points; 2) Head-to-head points; 3) Head-to-head goal difference; 4) Head-to-head goals scored; 5) Head-to-head away goals scored; 6) Goal difference; 7) Goals scored.
(C) Champions; (Q) Qualified for the phase indicated

=== Galați County ===
Pos	Team	Pld	W	D	L	GF	GA	GD	Pts	Qualification or relegation
1	Sporting Liești (C, Q)	28	28	0	0	179	25	+154	84	Qualification to promotion play-off
2	Metalosport Galați	28	22	0	6	102	41	+61	66	
3	Juventus 2007 Toflea	28	16	2	10	58	63	−5	50	
4	Quantum Club Galați	28	15	7	6	80	58	+22	52	
5	Gloria Ivești	28	15	2	11	81	60	+21	47	
6	Unirea Braniștea	28	14	5	9	60	51	+9	47	
7	Avântul Drăgănești	28	13	3	12	78	76	+2	42	
8	Sporting Tecuci	28	11	4	13	54	75	−21	37	
9	Victoria Independența	28	10	5	13	46	59	−13	35	
10	Avântul Vânatori	28	10	4	14	45	55	−10	34	
11	Muncitorul Ghidigeni	28	10	2	16	57	83	−26	32	
12	Fulgerul Smulți	28	9	1	18	60	94	−34	28	
13	Viitorul Costache Negri	28	6	2	20	57	108	−51	20	
14	Bujorii Târgu Bujor	28	5	3	20	49	112	−63	18	
15	Avântul Matca	28	5	2	21	35	81	−46	17	

Rules for classification: 1) Points; 2) Head-to-head points; 3) Head-to-head goal difference; 4) Head-to-head goals scored; 5) Head-to-head away goals scored; 6) Goal difference; 7) Goals scored.
(C) Champions; (Q) Qualified for the phase indicated

=== Giurgiu County ===
Pos	Team	Pld	W	D	L	GF	GA	GD	Pts	Qualification or relegation
1	Bolintin Malu Spart (Q)	30	21	4	5	91	38	+53	67 (Note: Bolintin Malu Spart deducted 3 points.)	Qualification to championship play-off
2	Spicul Izvoru (Q)	30	20	4	6	92	43	+49	64	Qualification to championship play-off
3	Avântul Florești (Q)	30	22	0	8	118	50	+68	64	Qualification to championship play-off
4	Nova Force Giurgiu (Q)	30	19	3	8	70	34	+36	60	Qualification to championship play-off
5	Prundu	30	19	1	10	93	48	+45	58	
6	Silver Inter Zorile	30	18	4	8	94	52	+42	58	
7	Rapid Clejani	30	20	1	9	89	37	+52	52 (Note: Rapid Clejani deducted 9 points, subsequently excluded from the championship and lost all remaining matches with 0–3.)	
8	Real Vărăști	30	15	1	14	73	96	−23	46	
9	Argeșul Mihăilești	30	14	3	13	48	45	+3	43 (Note: Argeșul Mihăilești deducted 2 points.)	
10	Zmeii Ogrezeni	30	11	4	15	73	88	−15	37	
11	Viitorul Vedea	30	12	0	18	60	60	0	36	
12	Scărișoara	30	8	2	20	64	106	−42	21 (Note: Scărișoara deducted 5 points.)	
13	Dunărea Oinacu	30	7	4	19	39	76	−37	25	
14	Voința Slobozia	30	5	4	21	54	151	−97	19	
15	Victoria Adunații Copăceni	30	9	1	20	36	74	−38	28 (Note: Victoria Adunații Copăceni excluded in the second part of the season and lost all remaining matches with 0–3.)	
16	Progresul Palanca	30	2	0	28	35	121	−86	6 (Note: Progresul Palanca withdrew in the second part of the season and lost all remaining matches with 0–3.)	
17	Dragonii Ogrezeni (D)	0	0	0	0	0	0	0	0 (Note: Dragonii Ogrezeni and Ghimpați-Iepurești withdrew in the first part of the season and all their results were canceled.)	Withdrew
18	Ghimpați-Iepurești (D)	0	0	0	0	0	0	0	0	Withdrew

Rules for classification: 1) Points; 2) Head-to-head points; 3) Head-to-head goal difference; 4) Head-to-head goals scored; 5) Head-to-head away goals scored; 6) Goal difference; 7) Goals scored.
(D) Disqualified; (Q) Qualified for the phase indicated
Notes:

Championship play-off

Nova Force Giurgiu and Avântul Florești did not pay their debts to AJF Giurgiu and, as a result, were not scheduled to play in the semifinals. In these conditions, the final played on 12 iunie 2013, at Orășenesc Stadium in Mihăilești, between Bolintin Malu Spart and Spicul Izvoru.

Final

Team 1	Score	Team 2
Bolintin Malu Spart	3–1	Spicul Izvoru

Bolintin Malu Spart won the 2012–13 Liga IV Giurgiu County and qualify to promotion play-off in Liga III.

=== Gorj County ===
Pos	Team	Pld	W	D	L	GF	GA	GD	Pts	Qualification or relegation
1	Știința Turceni (C, Q)	26	24	1	1	90	15	+75	73	Qualification to promotion play-off
2	Gilortul Târgu Cărbunești	26	19	4	3	86	19	+67	61	
3	Petrofac Țicleni	26	18	5	3	75	25	+50	59	
4	Internațional Bălești	26	18	2	6	55	27	+28	56	
5	Unirea Crușeț	26	14	4	8	56	44	+12	46	
6	Inter Bâlteni	26	10	9	7	48	50	−2	39	
7	Parângul Sadu	26	10	4	12	44	46	−2	34	
8	Știința Hurezeni	26	8	3	15	46	73	−27	27	
9	Viitorul Negomir	26	8	2	16	45	61	−16	26	
10	Minerul Mătăsari II	26	7	3	16	43	75	−32	24	
11	Vulturii Fărcășești	26	6	5	15	38	74	−36	23	
12	Petrolul Stoina	26	5	6	15	38	70	−32	21	
13	Flacăra Roșia de Amaradia (R)	26	5	3	18	35	80	−45	18	Relegation to Liga V Gorj
14	Energetica Tismana (R)	26	3	3	20	36	76	−40	12	Relegation to Liga V Gorj

Rules for classification: 1) Points; 2) Head-to-head points; 3) Head-to-head goal difference; 4) Head-to-head goals scored; 5) Head-to-head away goals scored; 6) Goal difference; 7) Goals scored.
(C) Champions; (Q) Qualified for the phase indicated; (R) Relegated

=== Harghita County ===
Pos	Team	Pld	W	D	L	GF	GA	GD	Pts	Qualification or relegation
1	Miercurea Ciuc (C, Q)	22	22	0	0	130	6	+124	66	Qualification to promotion play-off
2	Metalul Vlăhița	22	15	2	5	64	43	+21	45 (Note: Metalul Vlăhița deducted 6 points.)	
3	MÜ Frumoasa	22	12	3	7	59	42	+17	39	
4	Viitorul Gheorgheni	22	12	3	7	40	32	+8	39	
5	Unirea Cristuru Secuiesc	22	10	4	8	46	40	+6	34	
6	Știința Sărmaș	22	10	1	11	42	49	−7	31	
7	Praid	22	8	4	10	22	42	−20	28	
8	Ciceu (R)	22	7	2	13	29	50	−21	23 (Note: Ciceu was excluded from the championship after the 15th round and lost all remaining matches with 0–3.)	Relegation to Liga V Harghita
9	Lunca de Sus	22	8	2	12	28	50	−22	23 (Note: Lunca de Sus deducted 3 points.)	
10	Hargita Cârța	22	5	3	14	27	43	−16	18	
11	Homorod Merești	22	5	2	15	22	77	−55	17	
12	Roseal Odorheiu Secuiesc (R)	22	4	2	16	19	54	−35	14	Relegation to Liga V Harghita

Rules for classification: 1) Points; 2) Head-to-head points; 3) Head-to-head goal difference; 4) Head-to-head goals scored; 5) Head-to-head away goals scored; 6) Goal difference; 7) Goals scored.
(C) Champions; (Q) Qualified for the phase indicated; (R) Relegated

=== Hunedoara County ===
Pos	Team	Pld	W	D	L	GF	GA	GD	Pts	Qualification or relegation
1	Universitatea Petroșani (C, Q)	34	23	5	6	80	26	+54	74 (Note: Universitatea Petroșani–Retezatul Hațeg 3–0; Retezatul Hațeg–Universitatea Petroșani 0–3.)	Qualification to promotion play-off
2	Retezatul Hațeg	34	23	5	6	87	41	+46	74	
3	Minerul Uricani	34	23	3	8	71	30	+41	72	
4	Vulcan	34	20	7	7	87	40	+47	67	
5	Gloria Geoagiu	34	19	7	8	71	38	+33	64	
6	Hercules Lupeni	34	19	6	9	79	47	+32	63	
7	Aurul Brad	34	17	11	6	62	28	+34	62	
8	Dacia Orăștie	34	18	4	12	80	53	+27	58	
9	Metalul Crișcior	34	18	2	14	76	56	+20	56	
10	Aurul Certej	34	16	7	11	84	50	+34	55	
11	Șoimul Băița	34	15	9	10	62	41	+21	54	
12	Ghelari	34	11	2	21	61	89	−28	35	
13	Inter Petrila	34	9	6	19	53	80	−27	33	
14	CFR Simeria	34	9	4	21	63	98	−35	31	
15	Victoria Călan	34	9	3	22	37	96	−59	30	
16	Jiul Petroșani II	34	7	4	23	55	116	−61	25	
17	Retezatul Râul de Mori	33	3	3	27	22	103	−81	12 (Note: Retezatul Râul de Mori and Zarandul Crișcior withdrew from championship.)	
18	Zarandul Crișcior	33	1	2	30	10	108	−98	5	

Rules for classification: 1) Points; 2) Head-to-head points; 3) Head-to-head goal difference; 4) Head-to-head goals scored; 5) Head-to-head away goals scored; 6) Goal difference; 7) Goals scored.
(C) Champions; (Q) Qualified for the phase indicated

=== Ialomița County ===
Pos	Team	Pld	W	D	L	GF	GA	GD	Pts	Qualification or relegation
1	Voința Cocora (C, Q)	26	20	3	3	97	30	+67	63	Qualification to promotion play-off
2	Victoria Țăndărei	26	18	3	5	79	32	+47	57	
3	Viticola Fetești	26	15	3	8	71	43	+28	48	
4	Victoria Munteni-Buzău	26	15	3	8	51	42	+9	48	
5	Rădulești	26	13	6	7	83	57	+26	45	
6	Unirea Manasia	26	12	4	10	59	49	+10	40	
7	Recolta Gheorghe Lazăr	26	12	4	10	57	67	−10	40	
8	Abatorul Slobozia	26	10	5	11	73	71	+2	35	
9	Recolta Gheorghe Doja	26	9	7	10	63	65	−2	34	
10	Amara	26	9	3	14	50	62	−12	30	
11	Voința Reviga	26	6	5	15	51	69	−18	23	
12	Unirea Grivița	26	6	3	17	46	90	−44	21	
13	Căzănești	26	4	6	16	47	98	−51	18	Spared from relegation
14	Spicul Colilia	26	3	5	18	47	99	−52	14	Spared from relegation

Rules for classification: 1) Points; 2) Head-to-head points; 3) Head-to-head goal difference; 4) Head-to-head goals scored; 5) Head-to-head away goals scored; 6) Goal difference; 7) Goals scored.
(C) Champions; (Q) Qualified for the phase indicated

=== Iași County ===
Pos	Team	Pld	W	D	L	GF	GA	GD	Pts	Qualification or relegation
1	Rapid Dumești (C)	30	28	2	0	130	18	+112	86	Ineligible for promotion
2	Viitorul Târgu Frumos (Q)	30	25	3	2	82	13	+69	78 (Note: Viitorul Târgu Frumos–Foresta Ciurea 4–0; Foresta Ciurea–Viitorul Târgu Frumos 0–0)	Qualification to promotion play-off
3	Foresta Ciurea	30	25	3	2	86	20	+66	78	
4	Stejarul Sinești	30	16	2	12	89	59	+30	50	
5	Holboca	30	14	4	12	65	47	+18	46	
6	Viitorul Hârlău	30	13	6	11	75	60	+15	45	
7	Kosarom Pașcani II	30	13	3	14	65	65	0	42	
8	Siretul Lespezi	30	12	3	15	71	58	+13	39 (Note: Siretul Lespezi–Unirea Ruginoasa 3–2; Unirea Ruginoasa–Siretul Lespezi 0–2)	
9	Unirea Ruginoasa	30	11	6	13	61	64	−3	39	
10	Gloria Bălțați	30	12	2	16	53	90	−37	38	
11	Unirea Mircești	30	11	4	15	52	84	−32	37	
12	Gloria Balș	30	10	6	14	66	66	0	36	
13	Viitorul Lungani	30	9	4	17	45	50	−5	31	
14	Victoria Lețcani (R)	30	7	1	22	51	92	−41	22	Relegation to Liga V Iași
15	Voința Bosia (R)	30	5	2	23	32	135	−103	17	Relegation to Liga V Iași
16	Astra Răducăneni (R)	30	2	3	25	28	130	−102	9	Relegation to Liga V Iași

Rules for classification: 1) Points; 2) Head-to-head points; 3) Head-to-head goal difference; 4) Head-to-head goals scored; 5) Head-to-head away goals scored; 6) Goal difference; 7) Goals scored.
(C) Champions; (Q) Qualified for the phase indicated; (R) Relegated

=== Ilfov County ===
Pos	Team	Pld	W	D	L	GF	GA	GD	Pts	Qualification or relegation
1	Corbeanca (Q)	26	23	3	0	136	23	+113	72	Qualification to championship play-off
2	Popești-Leordeni (Q)	26	23	1	2	96	16	+80	70	Qualification to championship play-off
3	Viitorul Dragomirești (Q)	26	18	2	6	85	42	+43	56	Qualification to championship play-off
4	Snagov	26	17	2	7	98	45	+53	53	Ineligible for promotion
5	Vulturul Pasărea	26	14	2	10	55	42	+13	44	Ineligible for promotion
6	Codrii Vlăsiei Moara Vlăsiei (Q)	26	13	2	11	51	58	−7	41	Qualification to championship play-off
7	Ciorogârla	26	10	6	10	53	49	+4	36	
8	Măgurele	26	10	3	13	58	69	−11	33	
9	Pescărușul Grădiștea	26	8	3	15	44	67	−23	27	
10	Voința Periș	26	8	1	17	36	76	−40	25	
11	Glina	26	7	2	17	53	103	−50	23	
12	Viitorul Găneasa	26	7	2	17	33	102	−69	23	
13	Ștefănești II	26	7	1	18	42	78	−36	22	
14	Viitorul Domnești II	26	0	0	26	3	81	−78	0 (Note: Viitorul Domnești II withdrew from the championship and lost all the matches from the second part of the season with 0–3.)	
15	Viitorul Petrăchioaia	0	0	0	0	0	0	0	0 (Note: Viitorul Petrăchioaia withdrew in the first part of the season and all its results were canceled.)	Expelled

Rules for classification: 1) Points; 2) Head-to-head points; 3) Head-to-head goal difference; 4) Head-to-head goals scored; 5) Head-to-head away goals scored; 6) Goal difference; 7) Goals scored.
(Q) Qualified for the phase indicated
Notes:

Championship play-off

Championship play-off played in a single round-robin tournament between the best four teams of the regular season. The teams started the play-off with the following points: 1st place – 3 points, 2nd place – 2 points, 3rd place – 1 point, 4th place – 0 points.

Pos	Team	Pld	W	D	L	GF	GA	GD	Pts	Qualification
1	Corbeanca (C, Q)	3	2	1	0	16	1	+15	10	Qualification for promotion play-off
2	Popești-Leordeni	3	2	1	0	14	2	+12	9	
3	Viitorul Dragomirești	3	1	0	2	6	12	−6	4	
4	Codrii Vlăsiei Moara Vlăsiei	3	0	0	3	2	23	−21	0	

Rules for classification: 1) Points; 2) Head-to-head points; 3) Head-to-head goal difference; 4) Head-to-head goals scored; 5) Head-to-head away goals scored; 6) Goal difference; 7) Goals scored.
(C) Champions; (Q) Qualified for the phase indicated

=== Maramureș County ===
North Series

Pos	Team	Pld	W	D	L	GF	GA	GD	Pts	Qualification
1	Iza Dragomirești (Q)	24	19	4	1	87	26	+61	61	Qualification to championship final
2	Rozalina Rozavlea	24	17	5	2	77	26	+51	56	
3	Avântul Bârsana	24	16	4	4	97	35	+62	52	
4	Zorile Moisei	24	14	4	6	74	29	+45	46	
5	Borșa	24	11	4	9	49	43	+6	37	
6	Luceafărul Strâmtura	24	10	4	10	38	53	−15	34	
7	Foresta Câmpulung la Tisa	24	9	5	10	46	64	−18	32	
8	Remeți	24	8	4	12	46	67	−21	28	
9	Plimob Sighetu Marmației II	24	8	1	15	58	70	−12	25	
10	Salina Ocna Șugatag	24	7	1	16	45	75	−30	22	
11	Bradul Vișeu de Sus	24	7	1	16	37	69	−32	22	
12	Brișca Sarasău	24	6	0	18	22	91	−69	18	
13	Recolta Săliștea de Sus	24	4	3	17	37	65	−28	15	

Rules for classification: 1) Points; 2) Head-to-head points; 3) Head-to-head goal difference; 4) Head-to-head goals scored; 5) Head-to-head away goals scored; 6) Goal difference; 7) Goals scored.
(Q) Qualified for the phase indicated

South Series

Pos	Team	Pld	W	D	L	GF	GA	GD	Pts	Qualification
1	Baia Mare (Q)	30	30	0	0	241	16	+225	90	Qualification to championship final
2	Eaton Fărcașa	30	21	4	5	121	51	+70	67	
3	Progresul Șomcuta Mare	30	20	4	6	80	42	+38	64	
4	Lăpușul Târgu Lăpuș	30	20	1	9	77	54	+23	61	
5	Seini	30	18	2	10	98	52	+46	56	
6	Spicul Ardusat	30	15	2	13	85	71	+14	47	
7	Sporting Recea	30	13	5	12	73	103	−30	44	
8	Spicul Mocira	30	13	4	13	63	72	−9	43	
9	Bradul Groșii Țibleșului	30	12	4	14	58	87	−29	40	
10	Vectrix Satulung	30	12	3	15	62	78	−16	39	
11	Viitorul Ulmeni	30	9	2	19	45	87	−42	29	
12	Gloria Renel Baia Mare	30	8	1	21	48	98	−50	25	
13	Xela „V. Mateianu” Tăuții-Măgherăuș	30	7	2	21	44	101	−57	23	
14	Minerul Cavnic	30	6	5	19	27	91	−64	23	
15	Orizont Lăpușel	30	7	2	21	44	113	−69	23	
16	Unirea Șișești	30	6	3	21	55	111	−56	21	

Rules for classification: 1) Points; 2) Head-to-head points; 3) Head-to-head goal difference; 4) Head-to-head goals scored; 5) Head-to-head away goals scored; 6) Goal difference; 7) Goals scored.
(Q) Qualified for the phase indicated

Championship final

The championship final was played on 12 June 2013 at Viorel Mateianu Stadium in Baia Mare.

Team 1	Score	Team 2
Baia Mare	6–0	Iza Dragomirești

Baia Mare won the 2012–13 Liga IV Maramureș County and qualify to promotion play-off in Liga III.

=== Mehedinți County ===
Pos	Team	Pld	W	D	L	GF	GA	GD	Pts	Qualification or relegation
1	Recolta Dănceu (C, Q)	26	24	0	2	96	19	+77	72	Qualification to promotion play-off
2	Baia de Aramă	26	21	1	4	85	31	+54	64	
3	Minerul Mehedinți	26	18	3	5	91	19	+72	57	
4	Phoenix Izvorul Bârzii	25	17	5	3	68	24	+44	56	
5	Pandurii Cerneți	26	15	3	8	63	37	+26	48	
6	Strehaia	26	12	4	10	57	44	+13	40	
7	Dunărea Pristol	26	12	4	10	75	51	+24	40	
8	Blahnița Pătulele	25	10	3	12	62	60	+2	33	
9	Real Vânju Mare	26	7	5	14	48	56	−8	26	
10	Viitorul Cujmir	26	8	2	16	37	61	−24	26	
11	Agromec Șimian	26	6	5	15	39	71	−32	23	
12	Kladova Drobeta-Turnu Severin	26	5	1	20	31	113	−82	16	
13	Dunărea Gruia	26	4	1	21	27	67	−40	13	
14	Corcova	26	3	1	22	27	153	−126	10	

Rules for classification: 1) Points; 2) Head-to-head points; 3) Head-to-head goal difference; 4) Head-to-head goals scored; 5) Head-to-head away goals scored; 6) Goal difference; 7) Goals scored.
(C) Champions; (Q) Qualified for the phase indicated

=== Mureș County ===
Pos	Team	Pld	W	D	L	GF	GA	GD	Pts	Qualification or relegation
1	Mureșul Luduș (C, Q)	28	26	0	2	139	29	+110	78	Qualification to promotion play-off
2	Gaz Metan Târgu Mureș	28	21	3	4	76	44	+32	66	
3	Mureșul Rușii-Munți	28	20	2	6	107	41	+66	62	
4	MSE 08 Târgu Mureș	28	18	3	7	79	49	+30	57	
5	Iernut	28	15	4	9	98	61	+37	49	
6	Înfrățirea Valea Izvoarelor	28	14	4	10	93	56	+37	46	
7	Lacul Ursu Mobila Sovata	28	15	1	12	88	57	+31	46	
8	Gliga Companies Reghin	28	11	3	14	62	63	−1	36	
9	Miercurea Nirajului	28	11	3	14	60	68	−8	36	
10	Mureșul Nazna	28	11	1	16	47	65	−18	34	
11	Avântul Miheșu de Câmpie	28	9	5	14	55	87	−32	32	
12	Sărmașu	28	10	2	16	34	85	−51	32	
13	Junior Târgu Mureș	28	8	1	19	53	77	−24	25	
14	Mureșul Cuci	28	3	3	22	36	108	−72	12	
15	Gaz Metan Daneș	28	0	1	27	28	165	−137	1	

Rules for classification: 1) Points; 2) Head-to-head points; 3) Head-to-head goal difference; 4) Head-to-head goals scored; 5) Head-to-head away goals scored; 6) Goal difference; 7) Goals scored.
(C) Champions; (Q) Qualified for the phase indicated

=== Neamț County ===
Pos	Team	Pld	W	D	L	GF	GA	GD	Pts	Qualification or relegation
1	Cetatea Târgu Neamț (Q)	22	19	1	2	93	15	+78	58	Qualification to championship play-off
2	Spicul Tămășeni (Q)	22	15	2	5	89	26	+63	47	Qualification to championship play-off
3	Speranța Răucești (Q)	22	14	3	5	72	29	+43	45	Qualification to championship play-off
4	Voința Ion Creangă (Q)	22	14	2	6	75	38	+37	44	Qualification to championship play-off
5	Biruința Negrești	22	14	1	7	67	41	+26	43	
6	Moldova Cordun	22	11	0	11	64	45	+19	33	
7	Bradul Roznov	22	10	2	10	53	51	+2	32	
8	Zimbrul Vânători-Neamț	22	8	5	9	41	49	−8	29	
9	Victoria Horia	22	7	3	12	46	71	−25	24	
10	Viitorul Podoleni	22	7	0	15	38	76	−38	21	
11	LPS Roman	21	1	1	19	10	131	−121	4 (Note: LPS Roman withdrew after 19 rounds and lost all the remaining matches with 0–3.)	
12	Flacăra Brusturi	21	0	2	19	10	86	−76	2 (Note: Flacăra Brusturi withdrew after 11 rounds and lost all the remaining matches with 0–3.)	

Rules for classification: 1) Points; 2) Head-to-head points; 3) Head-to-head goal difference; 4) Head-to-head goals scored; 5) Head-to-head away goals scored; 6) Goal difference; 7) Goals scored.
(Q) Qualified for the phase indicated
Notes:

Championship play-off

The championship play-off was played in a single round-robin tournament between the best four teams of the regular season. The teams started the play-off with the following points: 1st place – 3 points, 2nd place – 2 points, 3rd place – 1 point, 4th place – 0 points.

Pos	Team	Pld	W	D	L	GF	GA	GD	Pts	Qualification
1	Cetatea Târgu Neamț (C, Q)	3	2	0	1	16	4	+12	9	Qualification for promotion play-off
2	Spicul Tămășeni	3	2	0	1	8	5	+3	8	
3	Speranța Răucești	3	1	0	2	5	17	−12	4	
4	Voința Ion Creangă	3	1	0	2	7	10	−3	3	

Rules for classification: 1) Points; 2) Head-to-head points; 3) Head-to-head goal difference; 4) Head-to-head goals scored; 5) Head-to-head away goals scored; 6) Goal difference; 7) Goals scored.
(C) Champions; (Q) Qualified for the phase indicated

=== Olt County ===
Pos	Team	Pld	W	D	L	GF	GA	GD	Pts	Qualification or relegation
1	Balș (C, Q)	32	26	3	3	124	20	+104	81	Qualification to promotion play-off
2	Oltul Drăgănești-Olt	32	22	4	6	92	31	+61	70	
3	Recolta Stoicănești	32	21	5	6	70	35	+35	68	
4	Milcov	32	20	5	7	89	46	+43	62 (Note: Milcov, Olt Scornicești and Viitorul Rusănești were deducted 3 points.)	
5	Viitorul Grădinile	32	16	9	7	67	42	+25	57	
6	Inter Markus Slatina	32	16	6	10	83	52	+31	54	
7	Avântul Coteana	32	15	8	9	59	48	+11	53	
8	Voința 2012 Băbiciu	32	15	3	14	57	64	−7	48	
9	Unirea Turia	32	13	4	15	58	80	−22	43	
10	Olimpia Rotunda	32	12	4	16	49	46	+3	40	
11	Vedea Văleni	32	12	3	17	61	83	−22	39	
12	Internațional Brebeni	32	10	5	17	38	57	−19	35	
13	Iancu Jianu	32	10	4	18	53	84	−31	34	
14	Gloria Vișina	32	10	3	19	63	106	−43	33	
15	Olt Scornicești	32	8	2	22	43	77	−34	23	
16	Viitorul Rusănești	32	8	2	22	47	88	−41	23	
17	Recolta Urzica	32	2	0	30	33	133	−100	6	

Rules for classification: 1) Points; 2) Head-to-head points; 3) Head-to-head goal difference; 4) Head-to-head goals scored; 5) Head-to-head away goals scored; 6) Goal difference; 7) Goals scored.
(C) Champions; (Q) Qualified for the phase indicated

=== Prahova County ===
Pos	Team	Pld	W	D	L	GF	GA	GD	Pts	Qualification or relegation
1	CSM Câmpina (C, Q)	34	31	3	0	113	15	+98	96	Qualification for promotion play-off
2	Petrolistul Boldești	34	24	4	6	116	22	+94	76	
3	Avântul Măneciu	34	21	4	9	103	44	+59	67	
4	Bănești-Urleta	34	21	4	9	81	45	+36	67	
5	Blejoi	34	18	6	10	94	56	+38	60	
6	Plopeni	34	19	3	12	83	54	+29	60	
7	Păulești	34	16	9	9	68	41	+27	57	
8	Unirea Urlați	34	17	6	11	75	56	+19	57	
9	Progresul Drăgănești	34	14	5	15	70	82	−12	47	
10	Chimia Brazi	34	13	6	15	56	65	−9	45	
11	Ploiești	34	12	7	15	48	57	−9	43	
12	Precizia Breaza	34	12	5	17	58	104	−46	41	
13	Astra II Ciorani	34	11	5	18	64	75	−11	38	
14	Brebu	34	10	4	20	52	61	−9	34	
15	Caraimanul Bușteni (Note: Caraimanul Bușteni was spared from relegation due to the promotion of CSM Câmpina to Liga III.)	34	9	5	20	53	74	−21	32	Spared from relegation
16	Ceptura (R)	34	8	4	22	52	111	−59	28	Relegation to Liga V Prahova
17	Brădetul Ștefești (R)	34	3	5	26	32	136	−104	14	Relegation to Liga V Prahova
18	Voința Vadu Părului (R)	34	4	1	29	40	160	−120	13	Relegation to Liga V Prahova

Rules for classification: Rules for classification: 1) Points 2) Head-to-head points; 3) Head-to-head goal difference; 4) Head-to-head goals scored; 5) Head-to-head away goals scored; 6) Goal difference; 7) Goals scored.
(C) Champions; (Q) Qualified for the phase indicated; (R) Relegated

=== Satu Mare County ===
Seria A

Pos	Team	Pld	W	D	L	GF	GA	GD	Pts	Qualification or relegation
1	Someșul Cărășeu (Q)	28	24	1	3	113	28	+85	73	Qualification to championship final
2	Recolta Dorolț	28	22	2	4	99	29	+70	68	
3	Turul Micula	28	22	2	4	92	40	+52	68	
4	Victoria Apa	28	21	2	5	77	44	+33	65	
5	Talna Orașu Nou	28	16	6	6	85	44	+41	54	
6	Dacia Medieșu Aurit	28	13	5	10	71	56	+15	44	
7	Sportul Botiz	28	11	5	12	50	60	−10	38	
8	Energia Negrești-Oaș	27	11	2	14	55	60	−5	35	
9	Voința Doba	27	9	4	14	61	69	−8	31	
10	Livada	27	9	5	13	48	65	−17	32	
11	Someșul Odoreu	28	8	3	17	45	70	−25	27	
12	Viitorul Vetiș	28	8	3	17	47	75	−28	27	
13	Unirea Păulești	28	3	6	19	33	99	−66	15	
14	Voința Lazuri	27	3	3	21	27	76	−49	12	
15	Voința Sătmărel	28	2	3	23	26	114	−88	9	

Rules for classification: 1) Points; 2) Head-to-head points; 3) Head-to-head goal difference; 4) Head-to-head goals scored; 5) Head-to-head away goals scored; 6) Goal difference; 7) Goals scored.
(Q) Qualified for the phase indicated

Seria B

Pos	Team	Pld	W	D	L	GF	GA	GD	Pts	Qualification or relegation
1	Someșul Oar (Q)	30	27	2	1	103	14	+89	83	Qualification to championship final
2	Unirea Tășnad	30	26	1	3	113	29	+84	79	
3	Schwaben Kalmandi Cămin	30	22	3	5	80	39	+41	69	
4	Fortuna Căpleni	30	16	4	10	46	32	+14	52	
5	Olimpia Căuaș	28	15	4	9	77	58	+19	49	
6	Gloria Moftinu Mare	30	15	4	11	63	44	+19	49	
7	Kneho Urziceni	30	13	3	14	40	47	−7	42	
8	Unirea Pișcolt	30	12	4	14	51	56	−5	40	
9	Real Andrid	29	11	6	12	52	49	+3	39	
10	Frohlich Foieni	30	11	2	17	36	68	−32	35	
11	Schamagosch Ciumești	30	10	1	19	40	57	−17	31	
12	Stăruința Berveni	29	10	1	18	38	78	−40	31	
13	Voința Babța	30	6	6	18	46	82	−36	24	
14	Crasna Moftinu Mic	30	6	5	19	47	76	−29	23	
15	Recolta Sanislău	30	6	4	20	29	69	−40	22	
16	Victoria Petrești (R)	30	5	4	21	24	87	−63	19	Relegation to Liga V Satu Mare

Rules for classification: 1) Points; 2) Head-to-head points; 3) Head-to-head goal difference; 4) Head-to-head goals scored; 5) Head-to-head away goals scored; 6) Goal difference; 7) Goals scored.
(Q) Qualified for the phase indicated; (R) Relegated

Championship final

The championship final was played on 8 June 2013 at Olimpia Stadium in Satu Mare.

Team 1	Score	Team 2
Someșul Cărășeu	3–0	Someșul Oar

Someșul Cărășeu won the 2012–13 Liga IV Satu Mare County and qualify to promotion play-off in Liga III.

=== Sălaj County ===
Pos	Team	Pld	W	D	L	GF	GA	GD	Pts	Qualification or relegation (Note: After 20 matches, the best four teams qualify for the championship play-off. The play-off consist in a single round-robin schedule.)
1	Rapid Jibou (C, Q)	23	18	2	3	70	25	+45	56	Qualification to promotion play-off
2	Barcău Nușfalău	23	17	3	3	78	29	+49	54	
3	Chieșd	22	11	3	8	71	58	+13	36 (Note: The Chieșd–Benfica Ileanda match, from the last round of the play-off, was interrupted at the 3–2 score and was not resumed anymore.)	
4	Benfica Ileanda	22	11	2	9	57	53	+4	35	
5	Dumbrava Gâlgău Almașului	20	10	2	8	66	45	+21	32	
6	Flacăra Halmășd	20	10	0	10	53	47	+6	30	
7	Sportul Șimleu Silvaniei	20	9	2	9	43	39	+4	29	
8	Meseșul Treznea	20	7	1	12	32	67	−35	22	
9	Cetatea Almașu	20	5	3	12	36	54	−18	18	
10	Gloria Bobota	20	5	3	12	27	52	−25	18	
11	Crasna	20	1	1	18	21	85	−64	4	

Rules for classification: 1) Points; 2) Head-to-head points; 3) Head-to-head goal difference; 4) Head-to-head goals scored; 5) Head-to-head away goals scored; 6) Goal difference; 7) Goals scored.
(C) Champions; (Q) Qualified for the phase indicated

=== Sibiu County ===
Pos	Team	Pld	W	D	L	GF	GA	GD	Pts	Qualification or relegation
1	Avrig (C, Q)	20	16	4	0	68	13	+55	52	Qualification to promotion play-off
2	Sparta Mediaș	20	13	4	3	46	14	+32	43	
3	Unirea Ocna Sibiului	20	14	0	6	55	25	+30	42	
4	Unirea Miercurea Sibiului	20	9	2	9	43	33	+10	29	
5	Agnita	19	9	1	9	42	32	+10	28	
6	Continental Sibiu	20	8	2	10	37	44	−7	26	
7	Curciu	18	7	2	9	42	49	−7	23	
8	Tălmaciu	20	6	3	11	34	51	−17	21	
9	Voința Sibiu II	20	6	1	13	43	44	−1	19	
10	Progresul Terezian Sibiu	20	5	3	12	28	78	−50	18	
11	ASA Sibiu	19	3	2	14	24	79	−55	11	

Rules for classification: 1) Points; 2) Head-to-head points; 3) Head-to-head goal difference; 4) Head-to-head goals scored; 5) Head-to-head away goals scored; 6) Goal difference; 7) Goals scored.
(C) Champions; (Q) Qualified for the phase indicated

=== Suceava County ===
Pos	Team	Pld	W	D	L	GF	GA	GD	Pts	Qualification or relegation
1	Pojorâta (C, Q)	30	23	5	2	76	24	+52	74	Qualification to promotion play-off
2	Foresta Mălini	30	19	4	7	85	41	+44	58 (Note: Foresta Mălini, Sporting II Arbore and Rapid CFR II Mihoveni were deducted 3 points.)	
3	Minerul Iacobeni	30	16	6	8	93	41	+52	54	
4	Bradul Putna	30	16	3	11	79	51	+28	51	
5	Gura Humorului	30	17	0	13	69	42	+27	51	
6	Bucovina II Frătăuții Noi	30	14	5	11	68	45	+23	47	
7	Avântul Volovăț	30	14	5	11	69	51	+18	47	
8	Sporting II Arbore	29	14	5	10	77	56	+21	44	
9	Rapid CFR II Mihoveni	30	14	1	15	67	102	−35	40	
10	Șomuz Fălticeni	30	11	4	15	37	48	−11	37	
11	Zimbrul Siret	30	11	4	15	49	67	−18	37	
12	Unirea Boroaia	30	11	4	15	70	89	−19	37	
13	Viitorul Liteni	30	10	5	15	43	72	−29	35	
14	Moldova Drăgușeni (R)	30	9	6	15	50	65	−15	33	Relegation to Liga V Suceava
15	Voința Stroiești (R)	29	6	4	19	34	88	−54	22 (Note: The match from last round between, Voința Stroiești and Sporting II Arbore, was not played due to the incidents that occurred at the end of the game reserved for junior teams.)	Relegation to Liga V Suceava
16	Florconstruct Pătrăuți (R)	30	2	3	25	29	113	−84	6 (Note: Florconstruct Pătrăuți withdrew from the championship during the winter half and lost all remaining matches with 0–3. It also deducted 3 points.)	Relegation to Liga V Suceava

Rules for classification: 1) Points; 2) Head-to-head points; 3) Head-to-head goal difference; 4) Head-to-head goals scored; 5) Head-to-head away goals scored; 6) Goal difference; 7) Goals scored.
(C) Champions; (Q) Qualified for the phase indicated; (R) Relegated

=== Teleorman County ===
Pos	Team	Pld	W	D	L	GF	GA	GD	Pts	Qualification or relegation
1	Sporting Roșiori (C, Q)	26	20	3	3	86	20	+66	63	Qualification to promotion play-off
2	Viață Nouă Olteni	26	16	3	7	58	34	+24	51	
3	Vârtoape	26	16	2	8	66	36	+30	50 (Note: Spicpo Poroschia–CS Vârtoape 3–0; CS Vârtoape–Spicpo Poroschia 3–0)	
4	Spicpo Poroschia	26	15	5	6	57	35	+22	50	
5	Pamimai Videle	26	12	5	9	50	46	+4	41	
6	Udinese Uda Clocociov	26	9	8	9	33	27	+6	35 (Note: FC Udinese Uda Clocociov–FC Traian 8–1; FC Traian–FC Udinese Uda Clocociov 1–0)	
7	Traian	26	11	2	13	33	46	−13	35	
8	Dunărea Zimnicea	26	9	5	12	49	47	+2	32 (Note: Dunărea Zimnicea–Rapid Buzescu 5–0; Rapid Buzescu–Dunărea Zimnicea 4–1)	
9	Rapid Buzescu	26	10	2	14	40	60	−20	32	
10	Voința Saelele	26	8	5	13	29	38	−9	29	
11	Metalul Peretu	26	7	7	12	37	50	−13	28 (Note: Metalul Peretu–Unirea Țigănești 2–1; Unirea Țigănești–Metalul Peretu 1–1)	
12	Unirea Țigănești	26	6	10	10	33	41	−8	28	
13	Atletic Orbeasca (R)	26	8	3	15	35	54	−19	27	Relegation to Liga V Teleorman
14	Dunărea Turris Turnu Măgurele (R)	26	4	1	21	24	98	−74	13	Relegation to Liga V Teleorman
15	Flacăra Talpa (D)	0	0	0	0	0	0	0	0 (Note: Flacăra Talpa withdrew from the championship after 11 rounds and all its results were canceled.)	Withdrew
16	Tineretul Ciolănești (D)	0	0	0	0	0	0	0	0 (Note: Tineretul Ciolănești withdrew from the championship after 7 rounds and all its results were canceled.)	Withdrew

Rules for classification: 1) Points; 2) Head-to-head points; 3) Head-to-head goal difference; 4) Head-to-head goals scored; 5) Head-to-head away goals scored; 6) Goal difference; 7) Goals scored.
(C) Champions; (D) Disqualified; (Q) Qualified for the phase indicated; (R) Relegated

=== Timiș County ===
Pos	Team	Pld	W	D	L	GF	GA	GD	Pts	Qualification or relegation
1	Nuova Mama Mia Becicherecu Mic (C, Q)	34	29	4	1	106	16	+90	91	Qualification to promotion play-off
2	Ghiroda	34	22	6	6	94	37	+57	72	
3	Chișoda	34	20	9	5	108	46	+62	69	
4	Pobeda Dudeștii Vechi	34	19	8	7	74	33	+41	65	
5	Unirea Sânnicolau Mare	34	19	8	7	73	41	+32	65	
6	CFR Timișoara	34	20	4	10	78	36	+42	64	
7	Dumbrăvița	34	17	6	11	63	49	+14	57	
8	Marcel Băban Jimbolia	34	14	7	13	70	54	+16	49	
9	Auto Timișoara	34	14	6	14	65	46	+19	48	
10	Arsenal Flacăra Făget	34	14	6	14	56	69	−13	48	
11	Belinț	34	13	5	16	74	64	+10	44	
12	Timișul Șag	24	13	4	7	69	57	+12	43	
13	Spartak Gottlob	34	11	3	20	54	96	−42	36	
14	Banatul Nerău	34	11	2	21	47	131	−84	35	
15	Peciu Nou	34	9	7	18	58	83	−25	34	
16	Real Dragșina (R)	34	10	4	20	41	85	−44	34	Relegation to Liga V Timiș
17	Avântul Bobda (R)	34	3	1	30	35	127	−92	10	Relegation to Liga V Timiș
18	Deta (R)	34	2	2	30	33	128	−95	8	Relegation to Liga V Timiș

Rules for classification: 1) Points; 2) Head-to-head points; 3) Head-to-head goal difference; 4) Head-to-head goals scored; 5) Head-to-head away goals scored; 6) Goal difference; 7) Goals scored.
(C) Champions; (Q) Qualified for the phase indicated; (R) Relegated

=== Tulcea County ===
Pos	Team	Pld	W	D	L	GF	GA	GD	Pts	Qualification or relegation
1	Unirea Casimcea (C)	30	28	2	0	157	16	+141	86	Ineligible for promotion
2	Izbânda Hagilarea Mihail Kogălniceanu (Q)	30	26	1	3	136	33	+103	79	Qualification to promotion play-off
3	Arrubium Măcin	30	22	1	7	103	43	+60	67	
4	Luceafărul Slava Cercheză	30	20	0	10	106	62	+44	60	
5	Pescărușul Sarichioi	30	17	4	9	99	48	+51	55	
6	Troesmis Turcoaia	30	17	3	10	91	59	+32	54	
7	Razim Jurilovca	30	15	5	10	82	65	+17	50	
8	Săgeata Stejaru	30	14	3	13	74	61	+13	45	
9	Hamangia Baia	30	13	4	13	68	70	−2	43	
10	Triumf Cerna	30	12	4	14	73	76	−3	40	
11	Granitul Babadag	30	11	5	14	75	78	−3	38	
12	Viitorul Frecăței	30	10	3	17	64	60	+4	33	
13	Tractorul Horia	30	6	3	21	58	137	−79	21	
14	Național Somova	30	6	0	24	47	154	−107	18	
15	Sarica Niculițel	30	3	2	25	35	147	−112	11	
16	Gloria Agighiol	30	0	0	30	18	177	−159	0	

Rules for classification: 1) Points; 2) Head-to-head points; 3) Head-to-head goal difference; 4) Head-to-head goals scored; 5) Head-to-head away goals scored; 6) Goal difference; 7) Goals scored.
(C) Champions; (Q) Qualified for the phase indicated

=== Vaslui County ===
Pos	Team	Pld	W	D	L	GF	GA	GD	Pts	Qualification or relegation
1	Gârceni (Q)	20	16	4	0	56	16	+40	52	Qualification to championship play-off
2	Olimpia Stănilești (Q)	20	14	3	3	59	20	+39	45	Qualification to championship play-off
3	Vitis Șuletea (Q)	20	12	4	4	55	24	+31	40	Qualification to championship play-off
4	Juventus Fălciu (Q)	20	12	3	5	43	19	+24	39	Qualification to championship play-off
5	Gloria Lunca Banului	20	10	0	10	38	36	+2	30	
6	Vaslui II	20	9	1	10	43	47	−4	28	
7	Flacăra Murgeni	20	9	1	10	63	54	+9	28	
8	Multim Perieni	20	8	3	9	42	44	−2	27	
9	Unirea Banca	20	4	2	14	42	86	−44	14	
10	Foresta Zorleni	19	3	1	15	27	43	−16	10 (Note: Foresta Zorleni and Olimpia Roșiești withdrew during the winter break and lost all the matches from the second part of the season with 0–3.)	
11	Olimpia Roșiești	19	1	0	18	12	68	−56	3	
12	Autorom Pădureni (D)	0	0	0	0	0	0	0	0 (Note: Autorom Pădureni withdrew in the first part of the season and all its results were canceled.)	Withdrew

Rules for classification: 1) Points; 2) Head-to-head points; 3) Head-to-head goal difference; 4) Head-to-head goals scored; 5) Head-to-head away goals scored; 6) Goal difference; 7) Goals scored.
(D) Disqualified; (Q) Qualified for the phase indicated
Notes:

Championship play-off

Pos	Team	Pld	W	D	L	GF	GA	GD	Pts	Qualification	GÂR	VIT	JFĂ	OST
1	Gârceni (C, Q)	6	4	1	1	11	6	+5	13 (Note: The match Gârceni - Juventus Fălciu 2–2 on the field was approved with the score of 0–3 against both teams.)	Qualification to promotion play-off	—	1–1	2–1	2–0
2	Vitis Șuletea	6	3	2	1	10	7	+3	11		1–3	—	2–1	3–0
3	Juventus Fălciu	6	2	0	4	7	9	−2	6		2–2	1–2	—	1–0
4	Olimpia Stănilești	6	0	1	5	1	13	−12	1		0–3	1–1	0–3	—

Rules for classification: 1) Points; 2) Head-to-head points; 3) Head-to-head goal difference; 4) Head-to-head goals scored; 5) Head-to-head away goals scored; 6) Goal difference; 7) Goals scored.
(C) Champions; (Q) Qualified for the phase indicated

=== Vâlcea County ===
North Series

Pos	Team	Pld	W	D	L	GF	GA	GD	Pts	Qualification or relegation
1	Hidroelectra Râmnicu Vâlcea (Q)	28	27	0	1	159	17	+142	81	Qualification to championship play-off
2	Posada Perișani (Q)	28	26	1	1	145	38	+107	79	Qualification to championship play-off
3	Băbeni	28	21	1	6	79	42	+37	64	
4	Flacăra Horezu	28	20	3	5	101	25	+76	63	
5	Viitorul Dăești	28	15	2	11	69	61	+8	47	
6	Minerul Ocnele Mari	28	12	5	11	55	52	+3	41	
7	Progresul Măldărești	28	11	4	13	69	90	−21	37	
8	Foresta Malaia	28	10	5	13	63	86	−23	35	
9	Viitorul Călimănești	28	9	4	15	39	62	−23	31	
10	Stejarul Vlădești	28	8	6	14	42	66	−24	30	
11	Victoria Frâncești	28	8	3	17	41	102	−61	27	
12	Lotru Brezoi	28	6	8	14	34	65	−31	26	
13	Unirea Păușești-Măglași (R)	28	5	3	20	29	86	−57	18	Relegation to Liga V Vâlcea
14	Căzănești Râmnicu Vâlcea (R)	28	4	5	19	27	77	−50	17	Relegation to Liga V Vâlcea
15	Conexin Runcu (R)	28	2	2	24	40	122	−82	8	Relegation to Liga V Vâlcea

Rules for classification: 1) Points; 2) Head-to-head points; 3) Head-to-head goal difference; 4) Head-to-head goals scored; 5) Head-to-head away goals scored; 6) Goal difference; 7) Goals scored.
(Q) Qualified for the phase indicated; (R) Relegated

South Series

Pos	Team	Pld	W	D	L	GF	GA	GD	Pts	Qualification or relegation
1	Unirea Drăgășani (Q)	28	23	3	2	108	18	+90	72	Qualification to championship play-off
2	Voința Orlești (Q)	28	21	3	4	110	24	+86	66	Qualification to championship play-off
3	Minerul Berbești	28	21	1	6	80	30	+50	64	
4	Viitorul Valea Mare	28	15	8	5	70	47	+23	53	
5	Mădulari	28	15	6	7	62	31	+31	51	
6	Experți Popești	28	16	3	9	81	59	+22	51	
7	Șirineasa	28	14	4	10	48	39	+9	46	
8	Topologul Galicea	28	12	7	9	55	31	+24	43	
9	Crețeni	28	12	1	15	45	61	−16	37	
10	Oltețul Alunu	28	8	4	16	36	70	−34	28	
11	Știința Grădiștea	28	6	5	17	39	73	−34	23	
12	Șușani	28	5	8	15	34	77	−43	23	
13	Juventus Roești (R)	28	6	1	21	30	71	−41	19 (Note: Inter Sutești and Juventus Roești withdrew in the second part of the season and lost all remaining matches with 0–3.)	Relegation to Liga V Vâlcea
14	Oltul Ionești (R)	28	5	4	19	37	105	−68	19	Relegation to Liga V Vâlcea
15	Inter Sutești (R)	28	1	2	25	13	112	−99	5	Relegation to Liga V Vâlcea

Rules for classification: 1) Points; 2) Head-to-head points; 3) Head-to-head goal difference; 4) Head-to-head goals scored; 5) Head-to-head away goals scored; 6) Goal difference; 7) Goals scored.
(Q) Qualified for the phase indicated; (R) Relegated
Notes:

Championship play-off
Semi-finals

Team 1	Agg.	Team 2	1st leg	2nd leg
Voința Orlești	3–5	Hidroelectra Râmnicu Vâlcea	1–2	2–3
Posada Perișani	4–1	Unirea Drăgășani	2–1	2–0

Final

Team 1	Score	Team 2
Hidroelectra Râmnicu Vâlcea	2–0	Posada Perișani

Hidroelectra Râmnicu Vâlcea won the 2012–13 Liga IV Vâlcea County and qualify to promotion play-off in Liga III.

=== Vrancea County ===
North Series

Pos	Team	Pld	W	D	L	GF	GA	GD	Pts	Qualification
1	Selena Jariștea	14	12	1	1	56	15	+41	37	Qualification to championship play-off
2	Foresta Gugești	14	11	1	2	49	12	+37	34	Qualification to championship play-off
3	Doctor GSM Suraia	14	9	1	4	28	24	+4	28	Qualification to championship play-off
4	Mărășești	14	6	1	7	31	33	−2	19	Qualification to championship play-off
5	Voința Odobești	14	5	2	7	35	41	−6	17	Qualification to championship play-out
6	Unirea Țifești	14	5	2	7	30	41	−11	17	Qualification to championship play-out
7	Flacăra Urechești	14	2	0	12	14	52	−38	6	Qualification to championship play-out
8	Adjud	14	1	2	11	19	44	−25	5	Qualification to championship play-out

Rules for classification: 1) Points; 2) Head-to-head points; 3) Head-to-head goal difference; 4) Head-to-head goals scored; 5) Head-to-head away goals scored; 6) Goal difference; 7) Goals scored.

South Series

Pos	Team	Pld	W	D	L	GF	GA	GD	Pts	Qualification
1	Energia Vulturu	14	11	2	1	54	17	+37	35	Qualification to championship play-off
2	Național Golești	14	11	1	2	52	19	+33	34	Qualification to championship play-off
3	Victoria Gugești	14	6	2	6	30	34	−4	20	Qualification to championship play-off
4	Câmpineanca	14	4	5	5	26	32	−6	17	Qualification to championship play-off
5	Voința Cârligele	14	5	1	8	28	36	−8	16	Qualification to championship play-out
6	Dinamo Tătăranu	14	5	1	8	28	37	−9	16	Qualification to championship play-out
7	Voința Slobozia Ciorăști	14	4	2	8	31	49	−18	14	Qualification to championship play-out
8	Podgoria Cotești	14	2	2	10	15	40	−25	8	Qualification to championship play-out

Rules for classification: 1) Points; 2) Head-to-head points; 3) Head-to-head goal difference; 4) Head-to-head goals scored; 5) Head-to-head away goals scored; 6) Goal difference; 7) Goals scored.

Championship play-off

The teams started the play-off with bonus points depending on the place occupied in the regular season : 1st place – 6 points, 2nd place – 4 points, 3rd place – 2 point, 4th place – 0 points.

Pos	Team	Pld	W	D	L	GF	GA	GD	Pts	Qualification
1	Național Golești (C, Q)	8	8	0	0	28	3	+25	28	Qualification to promotion play-off
2	Energia Vulturu	8	5	1	2	27	9	+18	22	
3	Selena Jariștea	8	3	2	3	9	8	+1	17	
4	Câmpineanca	8	5	0	3	15	14	+1	15	
5	Victoria Gugești	8	2	4	2	17	14	+3	12	
6	Foresta Gugești	8	2	0	6	12	24	−12	10	
7	Doctor GSM Suraia	8	1	2	5	9	17	−8	7	
8	Mărășești	8	1	1	6	10	38	−28	4	

Rules for classification: 1) Points; 2) Head-to-head points; 3) Head-to-head goal difference; 4) Head-to-head goals scored; 5) Head-to-head away goals scored; 6) Goal difference; 7) Goals scored.
(C) Champions; (Q) Qualified for the phase indicated

Championship play-out

The teams started the play-out with bonus points depending on the place occupied in the regular season : 5th place – 6 points, 6th place – 4 points, 7th place – 2 point, 8th place – 0 points.

Pos	Team	Pld	W	D	L	GF	GA	GD	Pts	Relegation
9	Voința Odobești	8	5	2	1	31	12	+19	23	
10	Unirea Țifești	8	5	3	0	24	7	+17	22	
11	Voința Cârligele	8	3	2	3	20	24	−4	17	
12	Dinamo Tătăranu	8	3	3	2	15	14	+1	16	
13	Voința Slobozia Ciorăști	8	4	1	3	20	18	+2	15	
14	Adjud	8	2	1	5	14	24	−10	7	
15	Podgoria Cotești	8	1	3	4	10	21	−11	6	Relegation to Liga V Vrancea
16	Flacăra Urechești	8	0	3	5	8	22	−14	5	Relegation to Liga V Vrancea

Rules for classification: 1) Points; 2) Head-to-head points; 3) Head-to-head goal difference; 4) Head-to-head goals scored; 5) Head-to-head away goals scored; 6) Goal difference; 7) Goals scored.

== See also ==
- 2012–13 Liga I
- 2012–13 Liga II
- 2012–13 Liga III
